= Upper Hudson AVA =

American Viticultural Area in New York

Coordinates: 42°44′26″N 73°58′03″W

Upper Hudson
- Wine region
- Type: American Viticultural Area
- Year established: 2018
- Country: United States
- Part of: New York
- Other regions in New York: Cayuga Lake AVA, Champlain Valley of New York AVA, Finger Lakes AVA, Hudson River Region AVA, Lake Erie AVA, Long Island AVA, Niagara Escarpment AVA, North Fork of Long Island AVA, Seneca Lake AVA, The Hamptons, Long Island AVA
- Climate region: Region Ib-II
- Heat units: 2300-2700 GDD
- Total area: 960,000 acres (1,500 sq mi)
- Size of planted vineyards: 67.5 acres (27.3 ha)
- No. of vineyards: 19
- Grapes produced: Marquette, Frontenac, La Crosse, La Crescent, Louise Svenson, St Croix, Kay Gray, Brianna, Cayuga, Itasca, Prairie Star and Melody
- No. of wineries: 19

Upper Hudson is an American Viticultural Area (AVA) located in all or portions of Albany, Montgomery, Rensselaer, Saratoga, Schenectady, Schoharie, and Washington Counties in upstate New York northwest of the state capital of Albany. It was established as the nation's 243^{rd} and the state's eleventh appellation on December 6, 2018 by the Alcohol and Tobacco Tax and Trade Bureau (TTB), Treasury after reviewing the petition submitted by Andrew and Kathleen Weber, owners of Northern Cross Vineyard, on behalf of local grape growers and vintners, proposing the viticultural area named "Upper Hudson."
At the outset, it was approximately 960,000 acres (1,500 sq mi) with nearly 67.5 acres (27.3 ha) under vine and 19 vineyards.

== History ==
The petition was submitted for review to the TTB on July 30, 2015. On April 9, 2018, the proposed establishment of the Upper Hudson Viticultural Area was published in the Federal Register and removed from TTB's list of pending AVA's. From April 9, 2018, to June 9, 2018, the document was open for public comment. On December 6, 2018, the Final Ruling was published in the Federal Register with an effective date of January 7, 2019.

Upon completion of the rulemaking process, TTB allows wineries in the AVA to use the term "Estate Bottled" or use the "Upper Hudson" AVA name on the wine label. According to the TTB regulations Estate Bottled requires that 100% of the wine came from grapes grown on land owned by or controlled by the winery, which must be located in the viticultural area. The winery must crush and ferment the grapes and finish, age and bottle the wine in a continuous process on the premise.

== Upper Hudson Wine Trail ==
The Upper Hudson Wine Trail legislation was passed by the New York State Senate and Assembly during the 2017 Legislative session. For the 2016–17 legislative session Assemblywoman Carrie Woerner, Senator Kathy Marchione and Wine Trail President Andrew Weber worked to get passage of the bill. It was signed into law by Governor Cuomo on August 21, 2017. The process began in the fall of 2015 after the AVA petition had been accepted as perfected by TTB. During the 2015–16 New York legislative session the Upper Hudson Wine Trail Bill was introduced as A10609 and S8052 where it was passed by the Senate.

== Regional Grapes ==
The principal varieties of grapes being grown and used in the winemaking process include Marquette and Frontenac for the reds and La Crescent and La Crosse for the whites. Many other varieties of cold hardly grapes have been developed by the University of Minnesota or the New York State Agricultural Experiment Station in Geneva, New York. Some of these new varieties can withstand temperatures of −35F.

== Climate ==
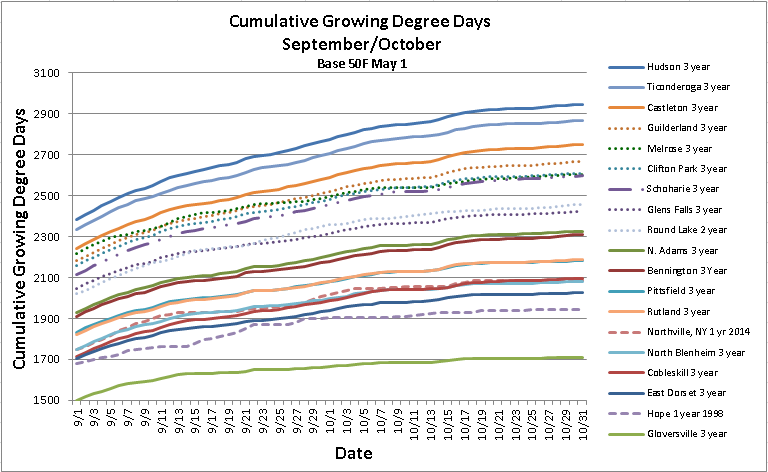
Upper Hudson GDD

The region has two major rivers running through it, the Hudson River and the Mohawk River. It is bounded by the Taconic Mountains to the east, the Adirondack Mountains to the North and West and the Catskill Mountains to the south. The defining feature of the region which distinguished it from the surrounding areas is Growing Degree Days (GDD), as shown in the chart. The Cumulative GDD chart displays data from 19 locations from September 1 to October 31. Being that the data is a three-year average, more than 10,000 data points are used. Those locations within the AVA are represented with dotted lines. Those locations outside the region are solid lines. The five temperature locations within the AVA and a location just outside the AVA (Schoharie) all lie in a grouping that plateaus at approximately 2500 GDD. The warmer locations along bodies of water have a greater GDD average and those areas in the various mountains surrounding the AVA have a lower GDD. The USDA plant hardiness zones range from 5a to 6a.

== Geology ==
The Upper Hudson region is an area rich in geologic/tectonic activity. Over the course of history the Adirondack Mountains, Allegheny Plateau, Taconic Mountains and the Mohawk and Hudson Rivers all have been produced by this activity. These features are the results of different tectonic movements and these features have created the topography that make up the Upper Hudson region and lends itself to creating the distinct differences from the surrounding areas. Most of New York State is under laid by sedimentary rocks: sandstone, shale, limestone and conglomerate. This is due to the fact that for much of New York States geologic history it was under water. 475 MYA seas covered all of New York and most of the eastern half of proto North America. During the Paleozoic era from 500 to 300 million years ago (MYA), very thick limestone deposits formed, nearly two thousand feet of sedimentary rock was deposited at the bottom of that ancient sea. Today those rock layers are visible in many places. Approximately 300MYA the tectonic plate movements that gave rise to the Allegheny Plateau and the Taconian Orogeny began to shape the region and began to create dry land. The Adirondack Mountains are a relatively new feature that was formed in the last 10 to 20 million years due to an uplifting or dome. The Adirondacks continue to grow today at a rate of approximately 2.0 to 3.0 mm per year. These three features along with the Hudson and Mohawk rivers give the region its characteristics. The second historic event is the ice sheets that advanced and retreated over the region numerous times, the Laurentide Ice Sheet. These ice sheets which at some time were more than 3 miles thick moved and deposited much of the overlaying soils in the region. They also changed some of the features developed from the much earlier tectonic movements and help to erode vast quantities of rock. They are the force that created the Finger Lakes. These ice sheet also contributed to the formation Lake Albany, a 160-mile inland body of water that stretched from Glens Falls NY to Poughkeepsie NY, but eventually drained.

== Vineyards ==
The vineyards within the AVA include, Altamont Vineyards, Autumn's Harvest Vineyard, Clover Pond Vineyard, Creek Haven Vineyard, Dusenberry Vineyards, Fossil Stone Vineyards, Galway Rock Vineyard, Helderberg 1839 Vineyard, Helderberg Meadworks, Hummingbird Hills Vineyard, Ledge Rock Hill Winery, Ives Hollow Vineyard, Northern Cross Vineyard, Redstone Ridge Vineyard, South Dominion Vineyard and Victory View Vineyard.

== Monetary Value ==
=== Market Size of New York's Wine Industry ===
New York's wine industry as a whole is quite significant, with the state ranking among the top wine producers in the U.S. According to the New York Wine & Grape Foundation, the state's wine industry contributes approximately $6.65 billion to the economy annually. This includes all aspects of the industry, such as production, tourism, and related sectors. However, the Upper Hudson AVA represents just a small fraction of this total, as it's a relatively small and emerging wine region.

=== Wine Production and Revenue from Wineries ===
As of now, there are only a small number of wineries in the Upper Hudson AVA. Given the size of the region, most of these wineries are relatively small and produce limited quantities of wine. The average revenue for a small winery can range from $100,000 to $1 million annually, depending on factors like the size of the vineyard, production volume, pricing, and market demand. Assuming that the Upper Hudson AVA has about 19 wineries, we might estimate their combined revenue to be in the range of $2 to $10 million per year—a rough estimate, but one that reflects the small scale of the AVA.

=== Tourism Impact ===
Wine-related tourism is a significant economic driver for New York wine regions, and while the Upper Hudson AVA does not have the same volume of visitors as the Finger Lakes or Long Island, it is still contributing to the local economy. The region benefits from its proximity to the New York City metropolitan area (a 2–3 hour drive away), which brings in visitors seeking wine-tasting experiences and local products.

The exact dollar value from tourism is not readily available for this AVA, but tourism in the broader Hudson Valley region (which includes the Upper Hudson AVA) is estimated to be worth over $5 billion annually. Of this, a small percentage—possibly around $50–100 million—could be attributed to wine-related tourism in the Upper Hudson AVA, though the exact figure is speculative.

=== Land Value and Vineyard Prices ===
The value of land in the Upper Hudson AVA would also contribute to its overall economic worth. Agricultural land suitable for vineyards in the Hudson River Valley (especially the Upper Hudson area) can vary widely, but prices are generally lower than in more well-known areas like Napa or Sonoma. Vineyard land prices in the Upper Hudson AVA might range from $5,000 to $20,000 per acre, depending on location, quality of the land, and proximity to key markets. The region could produce about 500 acres of vineyard land (a rough estimate), the total land value could be anywhere from $2.5 million to $10 million.

=== Estimated Economic Value of the Upper Hudson AVA: ===
Based on New York Wine & Grape Foundation, Hudson Valley Tourism and Vineyard Land Real Estate sources and estimates:

and estimates:

- Wine production: $2–10 million in annual winery revenue.
- Tourism: $50–100 million, as part of the broader Hudson Valley tourism economy.
- Land value: $2.5–10 million for vineyard land.

=== Total Estimated Economic Value: ===
Taking all these factors into account (wineries, tourism, and land value), the estimated total economic value of the Upper Hudson AVA could be approximately $10–20 million annually. This is a rough approximation, considering the region is still growing and developing. As the AVA gains recognition, production increases, and tourism grows, this number could rise over time.
