= Niagara Escarpment AVA =

American Viticultural Area in Niagara County, New York

Coordinates: 43°10′36″N 78°59′27″W

Niagara Escarpment
- Wine region
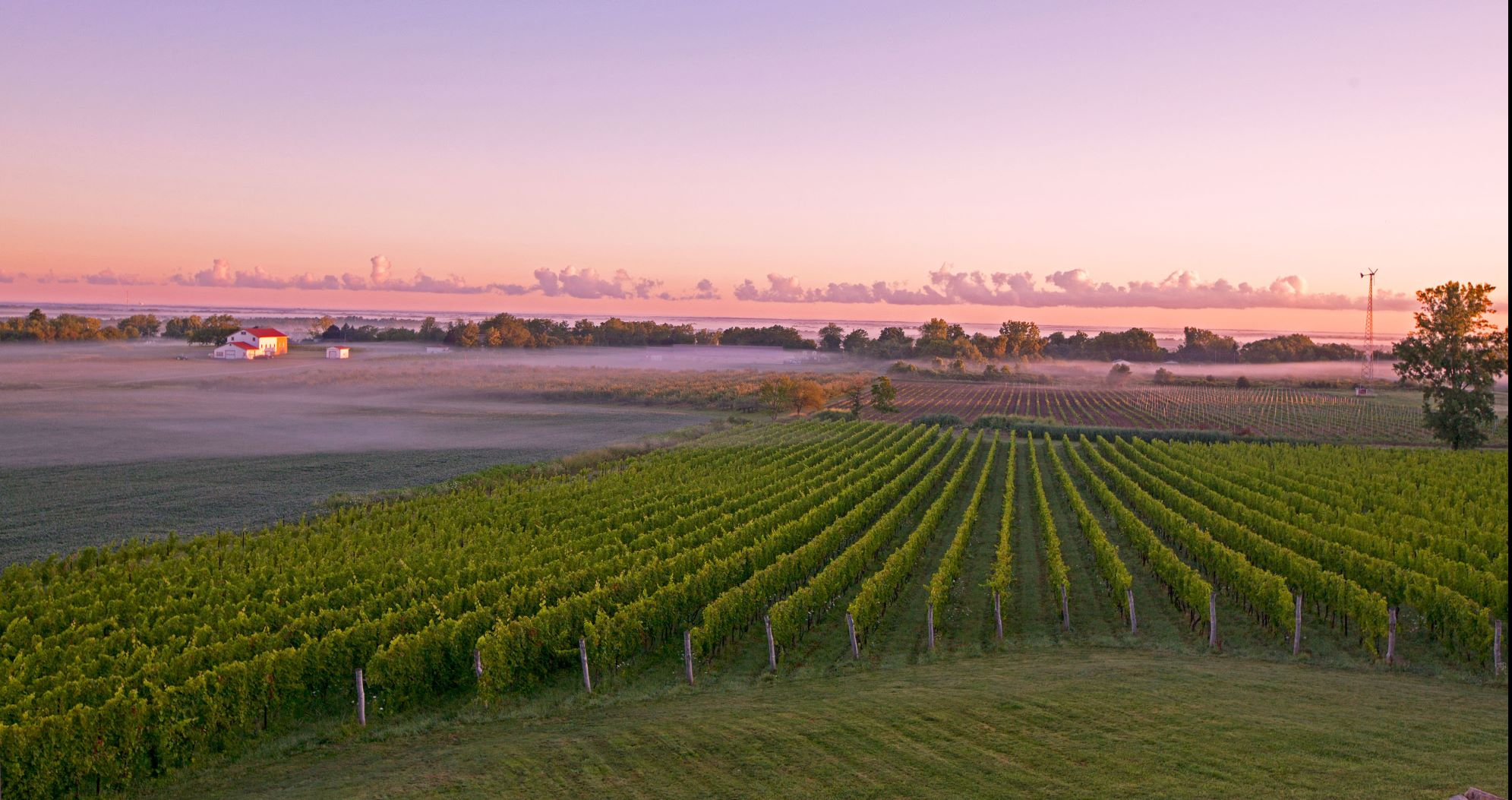
- Arrowhead Spring Vineyards on the Niagara Escarpment
- Type: American Viticultural Area
- Year established: 2005
- Years of wine industry: 36
- Country: United States
- Part of: New York
- Other regions in New York: Cayuga Lake AVA, Champlain Valley of New York AVA, Finger Lakes AVA, Hudson River Region AVA, Lake Erie AVA, Long Island AVA, North Fork of Long Island AVA, Seneca Lake AVA, The Hamptons, Long Island AVA, Upper Hudson AVA
- Climate region: Continental
- Total area: 18,000 acres (28 sq mi)
- Size of planted vineyards: 400 acres (160 ha)
- Grapes produced: Baco noir, Cabernet Franc, Cabernet Sauvignon, Catawba, Chancellor, Chardonnay, Concord, Diamond, Merlot, Niagara, Pinot noir, Riesling, Seyval blanc, Siegfried, Steuben, Syrah, Malbec, Vidal blanc
- No. of wineries: 11

Niagara Escarpment is an American Viticultural Area (AVA) in Niagara County, New York along the Niagara Escarpment. It was established as the nation's 165^{th} and the state's eighth appellation on September 7, 2005 by the Alcohol and Tobacco Tax and Trade Bureau (TTB), Treasury after reviewing the petition submitted by Michael Von Heckler of Warm Lake Estate Vineyard and Winery proposing an viticultural area to be called "Niagara Escarpment."

The boundary area runs in a narrow 28 miles (45 km) Niagara escarpment landscape which is part of a free-draining limestone ridge that also stretches around Lake Ontario and the Canadian province it was named after. It stretches from the village of Johnson Creek traveling west through the towns of Gasport and Lockport, and ending at the Niagara River at Lewiston. The 18,000-acre (28 sq mi) wine region is less developed with more available land than the 70 or so Niagara Peninsula wineries on the Canadian side of the Niagara River, but shares the same terroir. Wines range from traditional grape varieties such as Merlot, Cabernet Franc, Cabernet Sauvignon. Chardonnay and Riesling to fruit wines. The USDA plant hardiness zones range from 6b to 7a.

== History ==
The oldest winery in the region dates to the 19th century (no longer in business), but the region's growth began in the late 1990s with the opening of the first new winery. There are now 11 wineries cultivating approximately 400 acres (160 ha) of vineyards on the Niagara Wine Trail.
