= Champlain Valley of New York AVA =

American Viticultural Area in New York State

Coordinates: 44°28′58″N 73°22′41″W

Champlain Valley of New York
- Wine region
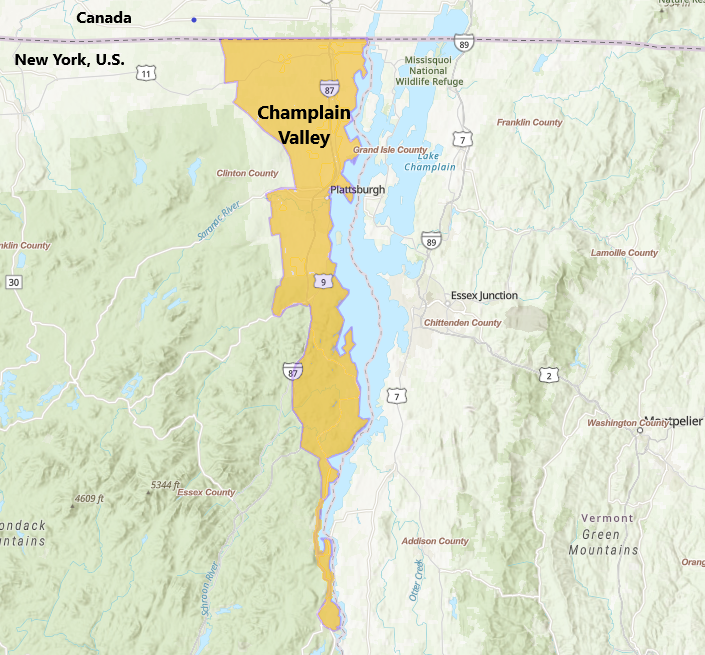
- Type: American Viticultural Area
- Year established: 2016
- Years of wine industry: 46
- Country: United States
- Part of: New York
- Other regions in New York: Cayuga Lake AVA, Finger Lakes AVA, Hudson River Region AVA, Lake Erie AVA, Long Island AVA, Niagara Escarpment AVA, North Fork of Long Island AVA, Seneca Lake AVA, The Hamptons, Long Island AVA, Upper Hudson AVA
- Growing season: 159 days
- Climate region: Region II-III
- Heat units: 1,500 to 2,500 GDD units
- Precipitation (annual average): 30 to 38 in (760–970 mm); Snow: 60 in (152 cm)
- Soil conditions: glacial silt above bedrock, slate, limestone, calcareous clay, sandy and clay loams with additional soils based on mountainous erosion
- Total area: 320,000 acres (500 sq mi)
- Size of planted vineyards: 120 acres (49 ha)
- No. of vineyards: fewer than 10
- Grapes produced: Cold-hardy North American hybrid grape varieties, Crimson Pearl, Frontenac, La Crescent, Laurentia, Marquette, Sabrevois, Petite Pearl, Riesling and St. Croix
- No. of wineries: 7

Champlain Valley of New York is an American Viticultural Area (AVA) located in Clinton and Essex Counties of New York nestled in its northeastern corner adjacent to the Canada–United States and state of Vermont borders. It was established as the nation's 237^{th} and the state's tenth appellation on August 22, 2016 by the Alcohol and Tobacco Tax and Trade Bureau (TTB), Treasury after reviewing the petition submitted by Colin Read, owner of North Star Vineyard, on behalf of the Lake Champlain Grape Growers Association proposing the viticultural area known as "Champlain Valley of New York."

The approximately 500-square-mile (320,000-acre) appellation lies within the long, narrow Champlain Valley on the western shore of Lake Champlain that stretches about 70.4 miles (113.3 km) on a north–south axis and is 19.8 miles (31.9 km) at its widest point on the Canada–United States border. At the outset, the AVA had 11 commercial vineyards cultivating approximately 15.47 acres (6.26 ha) with 6 wineries. The petition stated there were an additional 63 acres (25 ha) of vineyards planned for planting within the AVA in the next few years. The distinguishing feature of the Champlain Valley of New York AVA is its short growing season, which is conducive to growing cold-hardy North American hybrid grape varieties, i.e., Frontenac, La Crescent, and Marquette, but not the vitis vinifera grapes that are grown in the surrounding areas. The AVA is not adjacent nor within any other appellation.

Within the basin of the Champlain Lowlands, Lake Champlain acts as a thermal reservoir. The soil composition features ancient bedrock and glacial deposits, making the ground fertile enough to grow grapes that can handle the cooler climate. Frontenac, La Crescent, La Crosse, and Marquette are the varieties that each play a role in the Champlain Valley AVA to produce wines with a unique regional flair.

== History ==
Lake Champlain is where Jacques Cartier, a French explorer, first documented the native grape species, Vitis riparia, in 1535. These cold hardy vines could resist the extremely cool conditions of the area. Later, Samuel de Champlain, in the early 1600s, tried to transplant French vitis vinifera grape vines to the area. However, they all died because of the cold. Today, we still see mostly native and hybrid varieties in this AVA due to the extremely short growing season and the harsh winters. The vitis vinifera species you do find are cold-resistant ones, such as Riesling.

== Name Evidence ==
The Champlain Valley has been commonly used to describe the Lake Champlain Valley since the discovery and exploration of Lake Champlain by Samuel de Champlain in 1609. It is the area of land bordered by the Adirondack Mountains of New York to the west and the Green Mountains of Vermont to the east, the Taconic Mountains to the south and the St. Lawrence River Valley of Quebec to the north. Name evidence of Champlain Valley is widespread as the region has been known by the name since the exploration and settlement by early French and later English explorers. Lake Champlain and its valley were widely used for a route of travel and trade ever since its settlement by the Algonkians (various Algonquian speaking tribes) about 8000 years ago. Because the name "Champlain Valley" also applies to the portions of the valley that are in Vermont and Canada, the petitioner proposed the name "Champlain Valley of New York" to more accurately describe the AVA location.

== Terroir ==
=== Geology ===
The predecessor to Lake Champlain, the ancient Lake Vermont, was created by ice dams in the last major ice age to the north in Quebec. Lake Vermont, also called Glacial Lake Vermont, was a temporary lake created by the retreating glaciers during the close of the last ice age. The lake once included land in the Canadian province of Quebec and the American states Vermont and New York. It was a geographical predecessor of Lake Champlain. Once the glacier retreated far enough north, it drained into Glacial Lake Candona, the geologic predecessor of the St. Lawrence River. The surface of the lake was about 500 feet (150 m) above present day Lake Champlain. It was up to 900 feet (270 m) deep. Lake Vermont was a muddy lake as a result of all the glacial outwash. The ice damming the water at the north end, at what is now Warwick, Quebec, failed catastrophically about 10,000 years ago. The lake dropped 300 feet (91 m) in a matter of days and laid down nutrient rich sediment. This sediment forms the rich and well drained to moderately well drained soils that are typical in the region. Eventually when the glacier retreated far enough north, salt water swept in, replacing the larger, freshwater Lake Vermont with the smaller, saltwater Champlain Sea. Over time, surface water replaced the saltwater that had rushed in, the Champlain Sea lost its salinity and reverted to the freshwater lake that exists today.

=== Topography ===
The Champlain Lowland (Champlain Valley) is a low to moderate relief and tapers southward with a north–south rift valley underlain by Paleozoic sedimentary rocks and unconsolidated Pleistocene glacial, lacustrine and marine deposits. The boundary between the Champlain Lowland and the Adirondack Uplands is marked by a prominent fault-line scarp along much of its extent in the southern portion of Clinton County and Eastern Essex County. The minimum elevation of the Champlain Valley AVA is approximately 100 feet (30 m) above sea level at Lake Champlain. The Champlain Valley AVA has an approximate maximum elevation 625 feet (191 m) above sea level and 500 feet (150 m) above the Lake Champlain water level.

=== Climate ===
In the wind shadow of the Adirondacks, the Champlain Valley has more sunshine, less rainfall, less snowfall, warmer summer temperatures, warmer winter temperatures, fewer late spring and early fall frosts and freezes, and more productive soils than the mountainous region immediately to its west. Lake Champlain acts as thermal reservoir moderating the severe winters and the warm summers with a climate affected by the "lake-effect." The distinguishing feature of the Champlain Valley of New York AVA is a short growing season that is suitable for growing North American hybrid varieties of grapes but is too short for reliable cultivation of vitis vinifera grapes. Although the AVA extends approximately 82 miles (132 km) from the U.S.-Canada border to the southern tip of Lake Champlain, temperatures within the AVA are relatively uniform. The data included in the petition, lists the monthly maximum, minimum, and mean temperatures for four communities within the AVA. Ticonderoga, located at the southernmost point of the AVA; Peru located approximately 50 miles (80 km) north of Ticonderoga, in the middle of the AVA; Plattsburgh, located approximately 10 miles (16 km) north of Peru; and Chazy, located approximately 14 miles (23 km) north of Plattsburgh and about 8 miles (13 km) south of the U.S.-Canada border. The data shows that the AVA has a later last-frost date, an earlier first-frost date, and a shorter growing season than the surrounding regions to the north, east, and south. The region east of the AVA has a longer growing season due to the presence of Lake Champlain. According to the petition, as air moves eastward over the lake, it warms and increases in humidity. The warm, humid air reduces the risk of frost and contributes to a longer growing season on the Vermont side of the lake. Even though the lake is narrow, its moderating effect on surrounding temperatures is significant. The petition notes that South Hero, located on an island in Lake Champlain, is only one mile east of Peru, yet its growing season is almost 4 weeks longer than that of the AVA. The region to the south of the Champlain Valley of New York AVA also has a longer growing season. The growing season in Whitehall, within the Hudson River Valley, is two weeks longer than that of the AVA. The petition attributes the longer growing season to the warm, moist winds that flow upward along the Hudson River and the Mohawk Valley. These winds are blocked from entering the AVA by the Champlain-Hudson Divide, which is the slight ridge that separates the two valley systems. To the west of the AVA, in Lake Placid within the Adirondack Mountains, the higher elevations bring colder temperatures and a growing season that is much shorter than that of the AVA. According to the petition, the growing season within the Adirondack Mountains is too short for the commercial cultivation of grapes. Because of the short growing season within the Champlain Valley of New York AVA, V. vinifera grapes do not ripen reliably, so vineyard owners primarily grow cold-hardy North American hybrids. By contrast, V. vinifera grapes are commonly grown in the Vermont portion of the Champlain Valley, in the Hudson River Valley, and in the Upper Mohawk Valley near Lake Ontario. The USDA plant hardiness zones range from 4b to 5b.

=== Soils ===
Cornell University conducted extensive studies of the soils in the region. The primary soil determinant is glacial activity. Most of the soil deposits were made by retreating glaciers 10,000 to 14,000 years ago, or as sandy sediments from the drainage of ancient Lake Vermont. On these sandy and clay bases are organic material left by hardwood forests and plant residue decay. Organic materials constitute about 4% of the surface layer of soils in the region. This sand and clay combination, with relatively little organic material is shared across the region that was once under ancient Lake Vermont. Glaciation resulted in a depression of the land and the creation of the giant Lake that rose an elevation of approximately 500 feet (150 m), well above the current 95 feet (29 m) lake level, and along the approximate contour of this region. As the glaciers retreated, a sudden break of an ice dam drained this region of fresh water within just hours or days. Seawater rushed in and left the Champlain Sea behind.

This geographical shape was defined by geophysical forces that occurred in conjunction with the last ice age. These forces created a region of homogeneous soil types based on glacial silt above bedrock, with additional soils based on erosion into the Champlain Valley from the adjoining Adirondack Mountains, and from organic matter created by decay in the hardwood forest to the west of the region.

This Champlain Sea resulted as the land was depressed by ice during an ice age from 13,000 to 10,000 years ago. The Sea reached the southern terminus of present Lake Champlain (and the limit of this region) but also extended well past Ottawa, Canada to the west, and Quebec City to the east. The sea did not inundate the Adirondack Mountains, nor the lowlands on the west side of the Adirondacks to Lake Ontario. This former sea resulted in significant clay deposits throughout the region, with fossils of ocean fish and whales. This geological formation results in poorly sorted till formations that are relatively deep and typically above limestone bedrock. Streams running into the ancient Champlain Sea eventually created the freshwater Lake Champlain and also layered combinations of sediment on top of the marine deposits.

The common soils of the Champlain Valley are particularly well suited for growing grapes in soils that are nutrient rich with minerals. They tend to be well drained and range from flat to gently sloping river valleys to rolling hills. Water holding capacity of many soils is typically good for grape vine growth. Soil pH is well within the optimal range for grapes. Grapes require the same general type of soils as apple trees. There are many commercial apple orchards in the Champlain Valley, especially around Peru in Clinton County and along Lake Champlain. Some viticulturists are establishing vineyards being in the Bombay soils in the apple growing areas around Peru.

== Viticulture ==
Champlain Valley AVA enotourism can be experienced through the Champlain Valley and Adirondack Coast wine trails. With just a few wineries within the area, just 120 acres (49 ha) under vine, and established in 2016, this region has grown significantly. You can tour vineyards around the lake in New York, Vermont, and Québec. ELFS Farm Winery and Cidermill, Everett Orchards, Four Maples Vineyard, Hid-In-Pines Vineyard, Highlands Vineyard, Old Tyme Winery and The Champlain Wine Company. These are situated among the communities of Champlain, Chazy, Ellenburg, Keeseville, Mooers, Morrisonville, Plattsburgh, and West Chazy. They are considered amongst the highlights of Champlain Valley AVA.

== See also ==
- New York Wine
