= Finger Lakes AVA =

American Viticultural Area in New York

Coordinates: 42°29′11″N 77°07′52″W

Finger Lakes
- Wine region
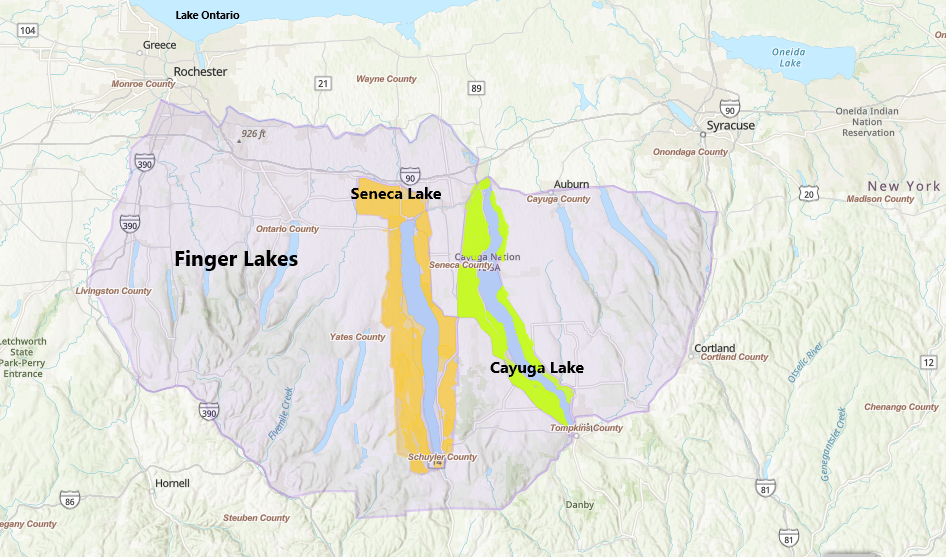
- Type: American Viticultural Area
- Year established: 1982
- Years of wine industry: 164
- Country: United States
- Part of: New York
- Other regions in New York: Champlain Valley of New York AVA, Hudson River Region AVA, Lake Erie AVA, Long Island AVA, Niagara Escarpment AVA, North Fork of Long Island AVA, The Hamptons, Long Island AVA, Upper Hudson AVA
- Sub-regions: Cayuga Lake AVA, Seneca Lake AVA
- Growing season: 190–205 days
- Climate region: Continental
- Precipitation (annual average): 30 to 40 in (760–1,020 mm)
- Total area: 5.4 million acres (8,400 sq mi)
- Size of planted vineyards: 9,393 acres (3,801 ha)
- Grapes produced: Baco noir, Cabernet Franc, Cabernet Sauvignon, Catawba, Cayuga White, Chambourcin, Chancellor, Chardonnay, Chelois, Colobel, Concord, Corot noir, De Chaunac, Delaware, Diamond, Dornfelder, Gamay noir, Geisenheim, Gewürztraminer, Himrod, Isabella, Ives noir, Lakemont, Lemberger, Leon Millot, Malbec, Marechal Foch, Melody, Merlot, Muscat Canelli, Muscat Ottonel, Niagara, Noiret, Pinot blanc, Pinot gris, Pinot Meunier, Pinot noir, Riesling, Rkatsiteli, Rougeon, Saperavi, Sauvignon blanc, Sereksiya Charni, Severnyi, Seyval blanc, Siegerrebe, St. Vincent, Syrah, Traminette, Verdelet, Vidal blanc, Vignoles, Villard noir, Villard blanc, Viognier
- No. of wineries: 130

Finger Lakes is an American Viticultural Area (AVA) located in upstate New York, approximately 25 miles (40 km) south of Lake Ontario encompassing entirely 14 counties: Cayuga, Chemung, Cortland, Livingston, Monroe, Onondaga, Ontario, Schuyler, Seneca, Steuben, Tioga, Tompkins, Wayne and Yates counties. It was established as the nation's twentieth and New York's second appellation on September 1, 1982 by the Bureau of Alcohol, Tobacco and Firearms (ATF), Treasury after reviewing the petition submitted by the Finger Lakes Wine Growers Association proposing a viticultural area named "Finger Lakes."
The "Finger Lakes Region" encompasses eleven lakes expanding about 5.4 million acres (8,400 sq mi) while the area around Canandaigua, Keuka, Seneca, and Cayuga Lakes is resident to the majority of vineyards. Cayuga and Seneca Lakes were established as sub-appellations, in 1988 and 2003, respectively, based on their unique terroir due to "lake effect." As of 2014, 130 wineries, 9,393 acres (3,801 ha) of vineyards harvesting 54,600 tons of grapes annually making Finger Lakes by far the largest and most productive wine region in the Empire State. About 80 percent of the state's wine production is sourced from Finger Lakes.

== History ==
The Finger Lakes were all carved out by glacial drifts during the ice age. The indigenous Seneca, a group of Iroquoian-speaking people who lived in the region hundreds of years ago were the first to utilize the microclimates created by the lakes varying water temperatures planting fruit crops which flourished. Iroquois legends proclaim the lakes to be the fingers of the Great Spirit and had Seneca names, i.e., Cayuga "People of the great swamp," Seneca "Stoney place," Keuka "Lake with an elbow" and Canandaigua "Chosen spot."

Viticulture in the Finger Lakes Region began in 1829, when William Warner Bostwick, an Episcopal minister in Hammondsport, received some Vitis labrusca vine-shoots from his father-in-law in Massachusetts. Bostwick planted them in his rectory garden in Hammondsport on the southern tip of Keuka Lake. He distributed Catawba and Isabella grapes cuttings to parishioners and soon offshoots from his vineyards spread throughout the region. Commercial viticulture officially began in 1862, when the Hammondsport and Pleasant Valley Wine Companies were founded. Two more companies were formed three years later and the region became famous for its sparkling wines, with the Pleasant Valley Wine Company winning European awards in 1867 and 1873. These successes spurred growth in commercial plantings in the area, and by the end of the century 25,000 acres (10,000 ha) were cultivating winegrapes.

In 1866, the western shores of Seneca Lake started its first winery, the Seneca Lake Grape Wine Company and planted 100 acres (40 ha) of grapes. At the time, it was the largest vineyard in the state. By 1869, they were producing 14,000 US gallons (53,000 L) of Seneca Lake's first commercial wine. Then, in 1882, New York State opened its Agricultural Experiment Station in Geneva, New York located at the north end of Seneca Lake. Its grape breeding and research programs helped to substantiate Seneca Lake as a prominent player in the viticulture industry. By 1900, there were over 20,000 acres (8,100 ha) of vineyards throughout the Finger Lakes region with more than 50 wineries.

A number of factors, including phylloxera, competition from California, and Prohibition, combined to cause a decline in commercial viticulture production in the early 20th century. Production resumed on a smaller scale after Prohibition was repealed. After World War II, soldiers returning from Europe had developed a taste for drier wines from Vitis vinifera varieties, as opposed to the sweeter wines produced from native American grape varieties. Unlike California, vintners in Finger Lakes were unable to grow Vitis vinifera due to the harsh winters. They experimented with French-American hybrid varieties with limited success.

A major boost in Finger Lakes viticulture occurred when Dr. Konstantin Frank, a Ukrainian immigrant with a PhD in Plant Science, came to work for the Cornell University Geneva Experiment Station in 1951. Commercial growers and researchers at the Geneva Experiment Station were convinced that European Vitis vinifera varieties could not grow in the cold Finger Lakes climate. After years of planting Vitis vinifera in the cold Ukrainian climate, Dr. Frank was sure that it could be grown in Finger Lakes if grafted onto the proper, cold-hardy native rootstock. He proved this in 1962 when he started Vinifera Wine Cellars in Hammondsport. Dr. Frank successfully grew and produced wine from Vitis vinifera grapes such as Riesling, Chardonnay, Pinot noir, Gewürztraminer, and Cabernet Sauvignon, grafted onto native rootstock. Vineyard plantings of Vitis vinifera varieties spread throughout the region, reinvigorating the Finger Lakes wine region's growth and popularity.

In July 2020, Finger Lakes agriculture was at risk due to the arrival of the spotted lanternfly in New York state. Native to parts of Asia, the spotted lanternfly was first seen in the United States in 2014, when it was found at a Pennsylvania landscaping company that imported stones from abroad. New York's annual yield from orchards and vineyards has a value of $358.4 million, which could be devastated if the spotted lanternfly is not contained. Control measures, trapping and research were conducted in high-risk areas of the state. Inspections of transport and plant material is occurring to prevent spread of populations. The NYSDEC has put into place protective zones in areas in close contact with neighboring quarantine areas of other states. The agency encouraged the public to be on the look out for the spotted lanternfly.

== Terroir ==
=== Topography and Climate ===
The "lake effect" weather phenomenon makes the Finger Lakes Watershed a "unique and superb" wine-growing region. Lake effect is "the year-round influence on vineyards from nearby large lakes which permits vine-growing in the northeast United States and Ontario in Canada despite their high latitude." The lake effect influence on grape vines changes with the seasons. In the winter, the large lakes provide moisture to the prevailing westerly winds, which creates a deep snow cover, protecting vines from winter freeze even in very low temperatures. In spring, the westerly winds blow across the frozen lake and become cooler. These cooler breezes blowing on the vines retard bud-break until the danger of frost has passed. In summer the lake warms up. By autumn/fall, the westerly winds are warmed as they blow across the lake. The warm breezes on the vines lengthen the growing season (balancing the late start to the growing season) by delaying the first frost.
The Central Lakes have a very perceptible influence on the climate of the region. The lakes are deep and conserve warmth. The water of Seneca Lake is so deep, and consequently warm, that it has been known to freeze over only a few times in the past hundred years. The winter climate in this region is much less severe than in adjacent territories. Not only does the water modify the severity of the winter climate but the enclosing highlands materially assist in keeping in the warmth of the valleys. Richard Figiel's book "Culture in a Glass: Reflections on the Rich Heritage of Finger Lakes Wine," cited in the petition of the viticultural area, describes how the lake effect phenomenon affects the Finger Lakes region. Noting that both Seneca and Cayuga Lakes drop well below sea level, the lakes are "(n)arrow slices of water with relatively little surface area, they tend to maintain a stable temperature throughout the year." Figiel notes that the depth and heat storing capacity of the lakes act as a large radiator for the surrounding area during the winter months. "Not only do the lakes take the edge off frigid upstate winters, often keeping vineyards 10 to 15 °F (−12 to −9 °C) warmer than locations just one-half mile (0.80 km) away," the book adds, "but they also cushion the transitions of spring and fall." Figiel also points out that the "(d)istinct microclimates along the hillsides rising from the lakeshores make it possible to reliably ripen grapes in a region that is generally too cold for viticulture." Finger Lakes averages 30 to 40 inches (760–1,020 mm) of annual precipitation. The region's USDA plant hardiness zones range from 5b to 6b.

=== Soils ===
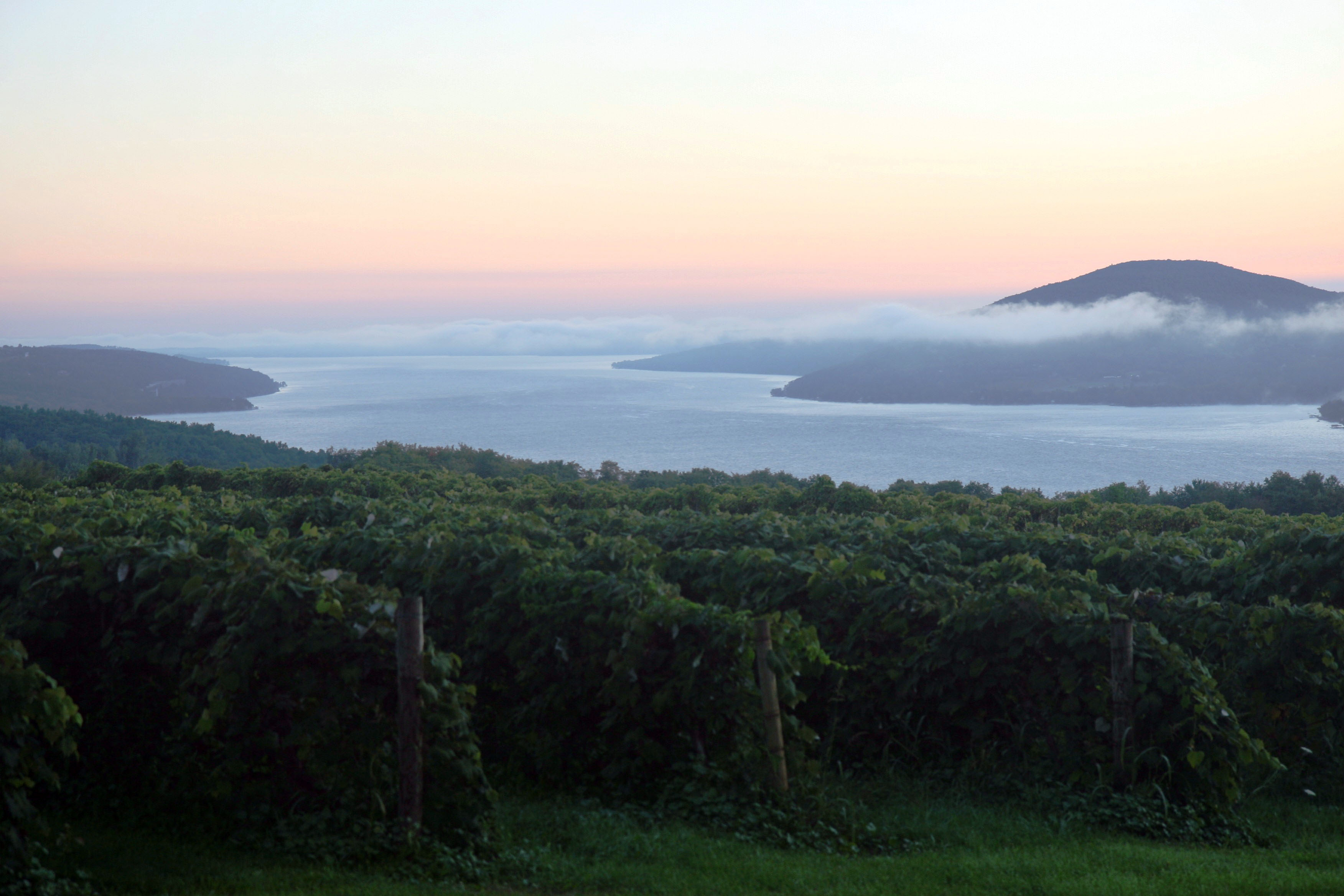
Canandaigua Lake vineyard at Sunrise

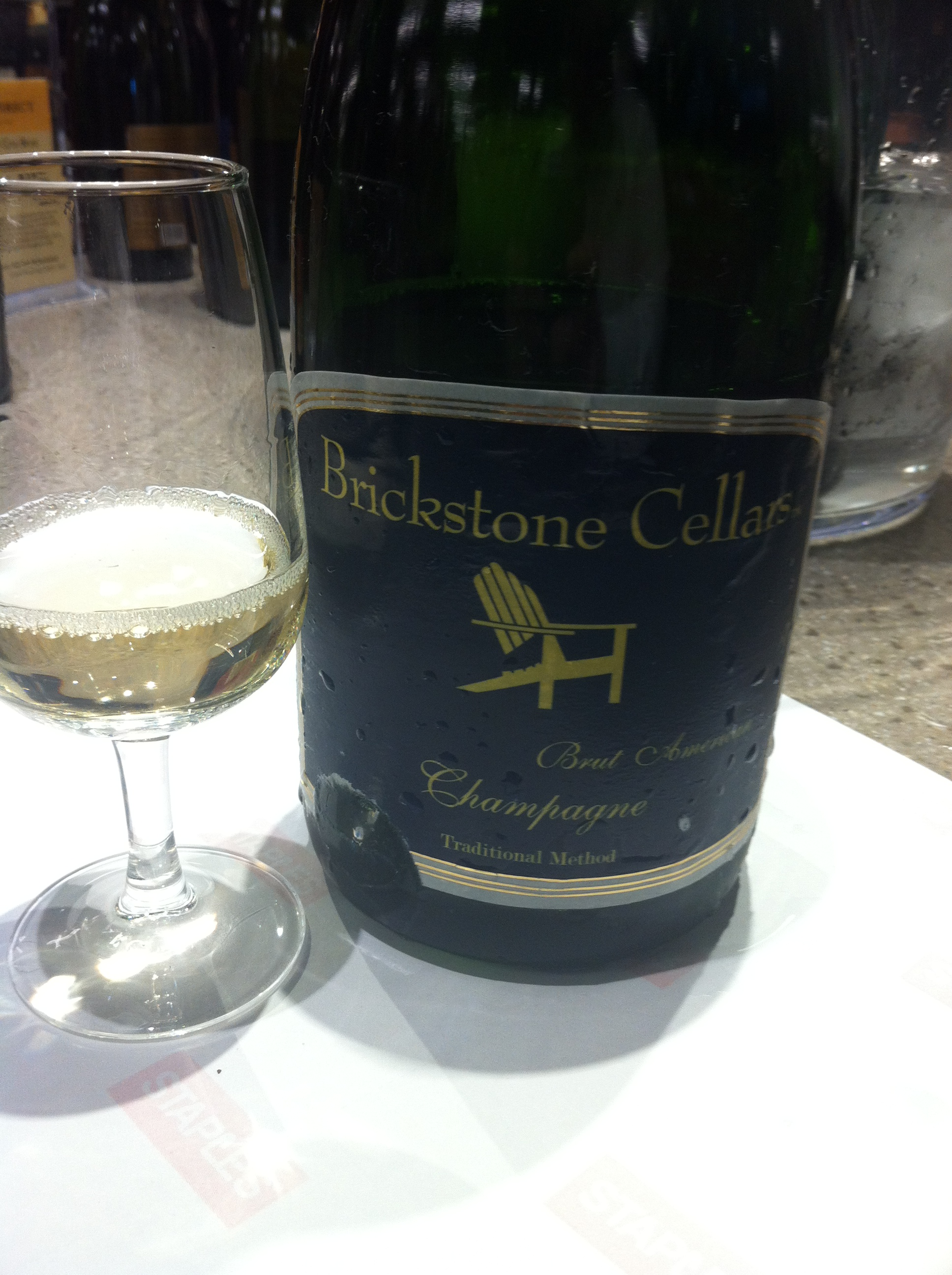
Finger Lakes Sparkling Wine

The Finger Lakes soils vary greatly, as is always the case when land is made by glacial erosion and deposits of glacial drifts. On a single farm the soil may be thick and fertile in one part and thin and poor in another; it may consist largely of clay in one part and of sand and gravel in others. The soil is generally deep, providing good drainage, however there are some areas, such as on the west side of Seneca Lake, where the bedrock is close to the surface.
The grape soils in the Central Lakes region are, in particular, of miscellaneous types, embracing, in one place or another, nearly all of the soils in the Dunkirk series described in the discussion of the Chautauqua district. Probably the Dunkirk clay loam, often very shaly and stony, is the most common of the several soils of the region. There are also considerable areas of a shaly soil which possibly do not belong to the Dunkirk types, not having been influenced by water action as are true Dunkirk soils. On the slopes and hillsides the land is sometimes rough and stony with but a thin covering of soil and with out-croppings of bedrock. The influence of the various soils on the grape has not been studied as in the Chautauqua district but, as noted, the soils in the two districts are in many cases similar so that the discussion of the influence of the several types given for the Chautauqua district will apply in large part to the Central Lakes district.

== Viticulture ==
Finger Lakes wine region is often compared to the German wine regions along the Rhine River. Riesling, one of the most important commercial wine grape varieties grown in Germany, is also one of the most successful varieties grown in the Finger Lakes. Viticulturists in the region grow a wide variety of grapes besides Riesling, including other European Vitis vinifera grapes, native American Vitis labrusca grapes, as well as French-American hybrid varieties.
