= Hudson River Region AVA =

American Viticultural Area in New York

Coordinates: 41°39′29″N 74°00′42″W

Hudson River Region
- Wine region
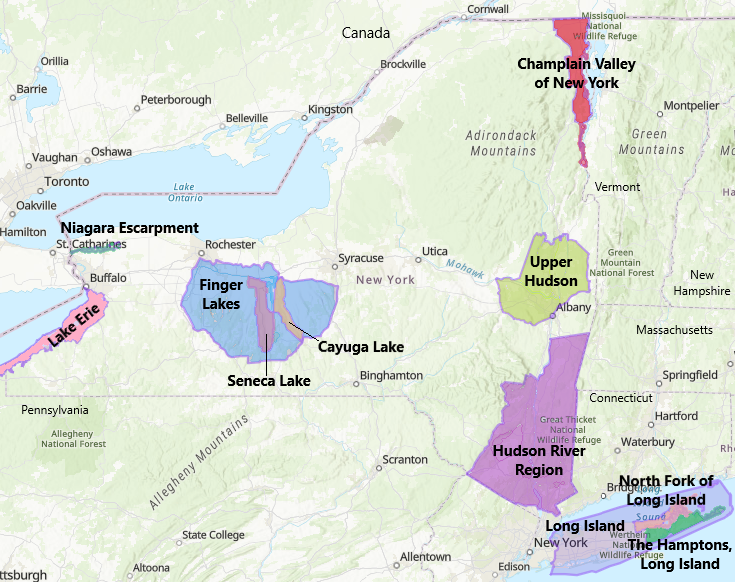
- New York AVAs
- Type: American Viticultural Area
- Year established: 1982
- Country: United States
- Part of: New York
- Other regions in New York: Champlain Valley of New York AVA, Cayuga Lake AVA, Finger Lakes AVA, Lake Erie AVA, Long Island AVA, Niagara Escarpment AVA, North Fork of Long Island AVA, Seneca Lake AVA, The Hamptons, Long Island AVA
- Growing season: 153 days
- Precipitation (annual average): 44 inches (1,118 mm)
- Total area: 2.2 million acres (3,500 sq mi)
- Size of planted vineyards: 1,000 acres (400 ha)
- No. of vineyards: 37
- Grapes produced: Baco noir, Cabernet Franc, Cabernet Sauvignon, Cayuga, Chambourcin, Chancellor, Chardonnay, Chelois, De Chaunac, Frontenac, Lemberger, Marechal Foch, Merlot, Pinot Noir, Riesling, Seyval Blanc, St. Pepin, Traminette, Vidal Blanc
- No. of wineries: 59
- Comments: As of 2022

Hudson River Region is an American Viticultural Area (AVA) centered around the Hudson River in southeastern New York State. It encompasses all of Columbia, Dutchess and Putnam Counties, the eastern portions of Ulster and Sullivan Counties, nearly all of Orange County and the northern portions of Rockland and Westchester Counties. The appellation was established as the nation's thirteenth and the state's initial AVA on June 4, 1982 by the Bureau of Alcohol, Tobacco and Firearms (ATF), Treasury after reviewing the petition submitted by Mr. Allan W. MacKinnon, proprietor of Cottage Vineyards located in Marlboro-on-the-Hudson, New York, proposing the viticultural area in southeastern New York State to be known as "Hudson River Region."

The viticultural area extends approximately 2.2 million acres (3,500 sq mi) with, at the outset, nearly cultivating 1,000 acres (405 ha) of grapevines. More than 90% of the vineyards are located in Columbia and Ulster Counties. The petition specified 13 wineries in the Hudson River Region, including 9 wineries which were established after the New York Farm Winery Act of 1976 liberalized the qualification procedures for small wineries. The region is home to the oldest continuously operating winery in North America, the Brotherhood Winery, established in 1839. The oldest continuously cultivated vineyard in North America is also located in the Hudson River Region, and is today operated by Benmarl Winery.

Most vineyards in the region are located within two miles (3.2 km) of the river. The Hudson River flows from north to south, and most vineyards are planted on the river's western hillsides where early morning sunshine can rapidly warm the vines. Ocean breezes channeled north up the river help to moderate the climate in the region, making it cooler in the summer and warmer in the winter than surrounding areas. The most important grape varieties in the area are French hybrids and cool-climate Vitis vinifera varieties.

== History ==
Wine has been made continuously in the Hudson River Region for over 300 years, since French Huguenots first settled at New Paltz, NY in 1677. The first commercial winery was established in 1827 on Croton Point in Westchester County. The oldest active winery in the United States was established in 1839 at Washingtonville, NY. On January 8, 1974, one winery in the area received permission from ATF to use the words "Hudson River Region" on its labels. Since then, most wineries in the area have been using that designation. The region has been recognized as a significant wine producing region in several articles in The New York Times, The New York Daily News, and the Long Island Newsday. Leon Adams in The Wines of America refers to the area as the "oldest wine growing district in the United States." In Grapes of New York, considered by the petitioner to be "the definitive tome on the subject of viticulture in the State of New York," written by U. P. Hedrick as the report of the New York Agricultural Experiment Station for the year 1907, the Hudson River District is defined as one of the four commercial grape districts in the State.

== Terroir ==
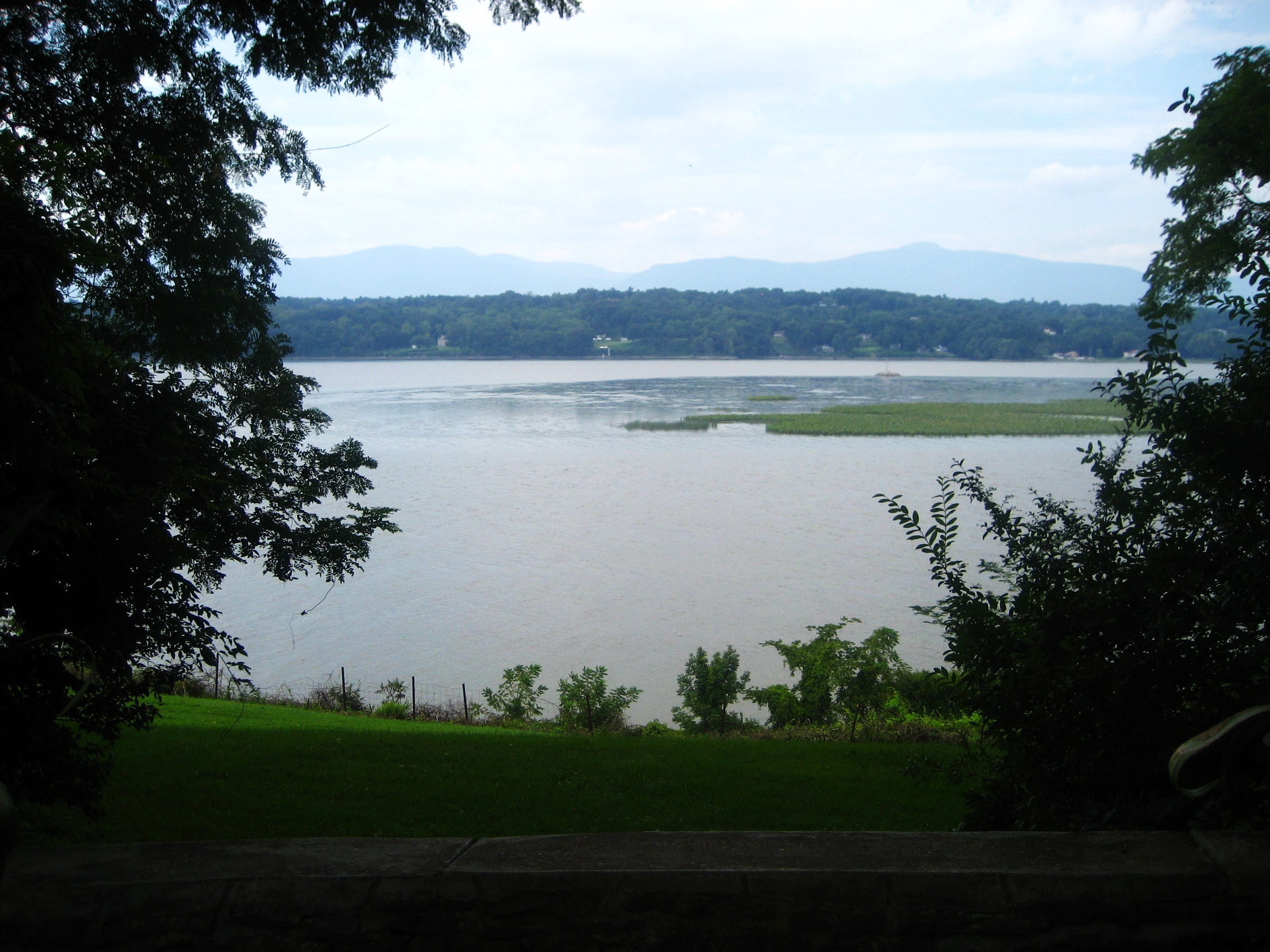
Hudson River Valley overlook

=== Topography, Geology and Soils ===
The Hudson River Region has been referred to as one of the most complex geological regions in the world. The grape lands in the area are in a geological division known at the Taconic Province. The area is surrounded by the Taconic and Berkshire Mountains to the east of the river; the Catskill Mountains and the Palisades cliffs to the west; and the Adirondack Mountains to the north. The Hudson Highlands span both sides of the river. Glacial deposits of shale, slate, schist and limestone form the soil throughout the region. Ultimately, glaciation has made for very diverse alluvial soils.

The Hudson River is tidal, changing directions twice daily, with influence as far north as the Federal Dam in Troy, NY, just north of Albany. Heading south from there, the river maintains a depth of at least 30 feet (9 m), dredged as a shipping route. Some areas however are much deeper – with the deepest part of the Hudson reaching 202 feet (62 m), called “Worlds End” near the US Military Academy.

The river is sometimes referred to, in geological terms, as a "drowned river". The rising sea levels after the retreat of the most recent Ice Age, have resulted in a marine incursion that drowned the coastal plain and brought salt water well above the mouth of the river. The former riverbed is clearly delineated beneath the waters of the Atlantic Ocean, extending to the edge of the continental shelf. Along the river, the Palisades are of metamorphic basalt, or diabases, the Highlands are primarily granite and gneiss with intrusions, and from Beacon to Albany, shales and limestones, or mainly sedimentary rock. As a result of the glaciation and the rising sea levels, the lower half of the river is now a tidal estuary that occupies the Hudson Fjord.

The Narrows were most likely formed about 6,000 years ago at the end of the last ice age. Previously, Staten Island and Long Island were connected, preventing the Hudson River from terminating via the Narrows. At that time, the Hudson River emptied into the Atlantic Ocean through a more westerly course through parts of present-day northern New Jersey, along the eastern side of the Watchung Mountains to Bound Brook, New Jersey and then on into the Atlantic Ocean via Raritan Bay. A buildup of water in the Upper New York Bay eventually allowed the Hudson River to break through previous land mass that was connecting Staten Island and Brooklyn to form the Narrows as it exists today. This allowed the Hudson River to find a shorter route to the Atlantic Ocean via its present course between New Jersey and New York City.

Suspended sediments, mainly consisting of clays eroded from glacial deposits and organic particles, can be found in abundance in the river. The Hudson has a relatively short history of erosion, so it does not have a large depositional plain near its mouth. This lack of significant deposits near the river mouth differs from most other American estuaries. Around New York Harbor, sediment also flows into the estuary from the ocean when the current is flowing north.

=== Climate ===
Climatography publications of New York and the United States show that the mean annual precipitation is approximately 44 inches. The mean date of the last freeze in spring is May 10, and the mean date of the first freeze in autumn is October 10. The mean growing season is approximately 153 days. The USDA plant hardiness zones range from 5b to 7b.
