= Long Island AVA =

American Viticultural Area in New York

Coordinates: 40°55′47″N 73°19′35″W

Long Island
- Wine region
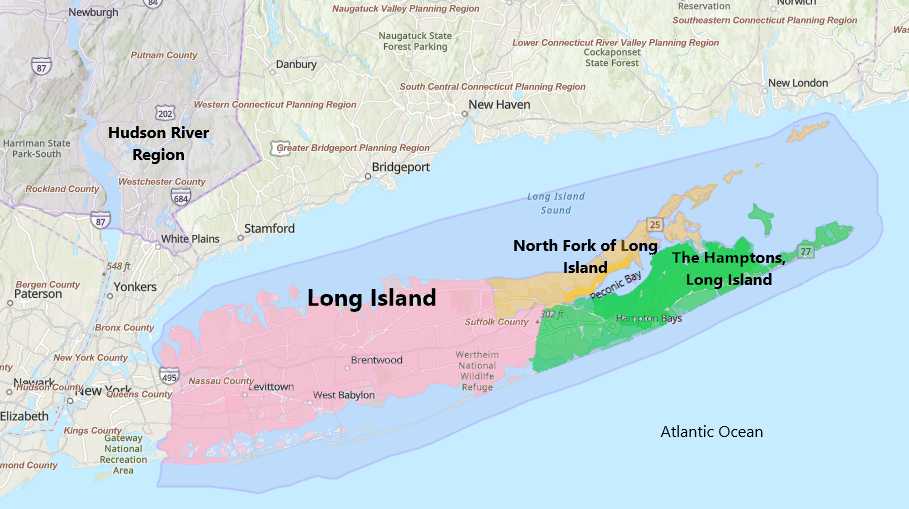
- Type: American Viticultural Area
- Year established: 2001
- Years of wine industry: 63
- Country: United States
- Part of: New York
- Other regions in New York: Cayuga Lake AVA, Champlain Valley of New York AVA, Finger Lakes AVA, Hudson River Region AVA, Lake Erie AVA, Niagara Escarpment AVA, Seneca Lake AVA, Upper Hudson AVA
- Sub-regions: North Fork of Long Island AVA, The Hamptons, Long Island AVA
- Growing season: 204 days
- Climate region: Region II-III
- Precipitation (annual average): 42 in (1,100 mm)
- Soil conditions: Predominately glacial till and outwash, sandy loam
- Total area: 750,000 acres (1,170 sq mi)
- Size of planted vineyards: 2,500 acres (1,000 ha)
- No. of vineyards: 38
- Grapes produced: Cabernet Franc, Cabernet Sauvignon, Chardonnay, Chardonnay Musqué, Merlot, Niagara, Petit Verdot, Pinot gris, Pinot noir, Sauvignon blanc, Tocai Friulano
- No. of wineries: 43

Long Island is an American Viticultural Area (AVA) encompassing Nassau and Suffolk counties of New York, including the smaller offshore islands off Long Island. It was established as the nation's 143rd and New York's sixth appellation on May 14, 2001 by the Bureau of Alcohol, Tobacco and Firearms (ATF), Treasury after reviewing the petition submitted by Richard Olsen-Harbich on behalf of Raphael Winery, the Petrocelli Family, and Karen Meredith of Broadfields Vineyards, proposing a viticultural area in Nassau and Suffolk counties to be known as "Long Island."

The appellation was established over fifteen years after the two smaller AVAs were designated at the eastern end of Long Island. The larger appellation benefits wineries located outside these AVAs and wineries that create blended wines from vineyards on different parts of the island. It was also developed and promoted as a consumer protection of the Long Island name, as appellations are required to have at least 85% of the fruit used in the designated wine are grown within the borders of the region. The petitioner was veteran Long Island vintner Richard Olsen-Harbich who also petitioned for "The Hamptons, Long Island" and "North Fork of Long Island" viticultural areas in the mid-1980s.
The name "Long Island" has been in continuous use from 1616 to the present representing the island on which the viticultural area is located. Vineyards on Long Island benefit from the moderating influence of the Atlantic Ocean, Long Island Sound, and Peconic Bay on the local climate.

== History ==
The name "Long Island" has been in continuous use from 1616 to the present to represent the island on which the viticultural area is located. The settlers trained the native grapes onto arbors behind their homes. Even today, many of the homes have grape arbors. This practice has been going on for as long as the settlers have been here. European wine grapes were not tried on Long Island until the Prince Nurseries started in the late 1700s. One of the earliest viticultural books written in the United States was by William R. Prince in 1830. His Treatise on the Vine lists the most favorable soil to grape growing as "light and sandy." This is the soil type of Long Island. He also states "light soils ... when porous, fine, and friable in their composition ... are the most suitable for the plant and for the quality of the wine." The world-renowned Australian viticulturist Dr. Richard Smagart, on a rare trip to Long Island in February 2000, stated that the soils of Long Island "are among the finest soils for grape growing that I have ever seen in the world."

Prince Nurseries was located in Flushing, Queens, on the western most end of Long Island and sold grapes and vine cuttings all way to the eastern end. The vinifera (European) grapes did not fare well in the Eastern United States during the 18th and 19th centuries due to the high humidity and disease problems that were inherent to the area. This disease problem has since been solved with advent of modem day fungicides and spraying equipment. The backyard arbors were pretty much the extent of grape growing on Long Island for most of the next 130 years (from the publication of Prince's book in 1830 to 1963). There were a few attempts at commercial grape growing but these, too, failed (most notably by a "Moses" Fournier who in the late 1800s planted quite a large vinifera vineyard near Mattituck).

The beginning of the successful commercial vineyards on Long Island was in March 1963. It was then that John Wickham, a fruit farmer in Cutchogue planted a selection of table grapes from Cornell University. So successful was one of the varieties that it was named "Suffolk Red," for the county in New York where it thrived. Wickham's Fruit Farm has since successfully grown grapes for over 35 years. Prior to his success, vinifera grapes did not survive because of a combination of diseases. The worst on Long Island (because of the high humidity) was black rot. It is Mr. Wickham's feeling that he succeeded because he used his orchard sprayer in combination with new, more effective fungicides. He stated, "It is the air-blast sprayer that has made grape-growing on Long Island possible."
The success of John Wickham led others to Long Island. It started slowly but has continued at an accelerated pace the past few years. Professor John Tomkins of Cornell University held conferences in the area in 1968 and 1971. In the "Suffolk County Agricultural News," Volume LV, No. 5, p. 22, he wrote, "there are many good sites for grapes on Long Island. Some apple and dairy farmers are taking a real careful look at the opportunities in grape-growing." This was in May 1971. The June 1971 conferences given by Professor Tomkins were well attended. They were also well reported. Two major newspapers ran articles about grape growing on Long Island. It was also Professor Tomkins who steered Alex and Louisa Hargrave to Long Island. Hargrave Vineyard was planted in 1973. It was the first commercial vinifera vineyard on Long Island in the 20th Century. Its success has led to over 2,500 acres (1,012 ha) of grapes planted in the last 26 years. And they are just the beginning.

It has taken over 350 years, from backyard arbors to create a multi-million dollar industry. But this success was foreseen by many. In the 1800s, Long Island grew many peaches. A Professor Nuttall of Harvard University is quoted by William Prince, "The Peach and the Vine being natural productions of the same region of the East, the opinion has been uniformly adopted, that a climate favorable to the one could not fail to be suitable to the other. And where, let me ask does the former thrive to a greater degree than in many other sections of our country? From the shores of Long Island ... the peach flourishes ... hence we may deduce the most sure prospects of an equal success for the vine."

== Terroir ==
=== Topography ===
Long Island viticultural area is unique from its bordering regions in that it lacks any real undulations, rock outcrops or muckland areas. By contrast, the Highland Basin, located immediately to the west-northwest of the Long Island viticultural area and encompassing the areas of northern New Jersey, the Hudson Highlands region of southern New York (including Manhattan, Westchester, the Bronx, and parts of Brooklyn and Staten Island), and upland parts of Connecticut, is a rugged, hilly-to-mountainous terrain. Similarly, the Newark and Atlantic Basins, located directly to the northeast and southwest of the viticultural area, contain characteristic sedimentary sandstones and mudrocks that usually bear a red or brownish appearance from an abundance of iron oxide minerals (hematite and limonite). None of these geologic formations exist in the Long Island viticultural area.

=== Climate ===
There is evidence in the record showing that the moderating influence of the Long Island viticultural area's surrounding water is evident in the temperature data. In terms of average temperatures, the viticultural area shows the highest average annual winter temperature compared to the surrounding areas. The Long Island viticultural area's average low temperature over thirty years is 43.5 °F (6 °C), 2.5 °F (−16 °C) warmer than the area of Westchester County and downstate New York, and 2.2°F warmer annually than the average from New Jersey. The Long Island viticultural area is also over 4°F warmer on average than Connecticut. The Long Island viticultural area also has the least extreme winter low temperatures than its surrounding areas with the lowest average being −5.67 °F (−21 °C). New Jersey was 1.63 °F (−17 °C) colder at −7.3 °F (−22 °C). Westchester/Downstate New York and Connecticut were seen to have winter low temperatures considerably colder than the Long Island viticultural area. Connecticut can experience temperatures as low as −13.5 °F (−25 °C) which is 7.83 °F (−13 °C) colder than the Long Island viticultural area. Westchester/Downstate New York proved to be the coldest with low temperatures reaching −15.3 °F (−26 °C) in some years which is 9.63 °F (−12 °C) colder than the Long Island viticultural area. Based on the standard University of California at Davis (UCD) temperature summation definition of climatic regions or zones, the Long Island viticultural area would appear to fall into high Region II (less than 3,000 degree days). Connecticut on the average is a borderline Region II with some years having Region I (less than 2,500 degree days) conditions. New Jersey is solidly classified as a Region III (less than 3,500 degree days), with some locations approaching Region IV (less than 4000 degree days) status in warmer years. The Long Island viticultural area historically has an average of 166 more degree-days than Westchester/Downstate NY and as much as 324 more degree-days than Connecticut. On average, the Long Island viticultural area experiences 204 frost-free days during the growing season. This is 31 days longer than New Jersey, 37 days longer than Westchester/Downstate NY and as much as 50 days longer than the Connecticut average. The Long Island viticultural area can therefore have as much as four to seven weeks more growing season than any of the surrounding land masses. On an average annual basis, the Long Island viticultural area has the lowest levels of precipitation of all the surrounding areas with 42 inches (1,067 mm) annually. The annual difference is 3.4 inches (86 mm) less than Westchester/Downstate NY, 3.8 inches (97 mm) less than New Jersey and 4.1 inches (104 mm) less than Connecticut. The reason for this difference is attributed to the moderating influence of Long Island Sound waters. The USDA plant hardiness zones range from 7a to 8a.

=== Soils ===
The record demonstrates that the soils of the Long Island viticultural area are glacial in origin. In general, the soils of the viticultural area contain a greater percentage of sand and gravel and a lower percentage of silt, loam and clay than in the soil associations and series found in bordering areas. Soils in the Long Island viticultural area lack any real percentage of natural limestone when compared to surrounding regions. The soils of the viticultural area are more acidic and make an agricultural liming program indispensable to any vineyard operation. Because of this factor, the soils of the viticultural area are also slightly lower in natural fertility and water-holding capacity than neighboring areas. According to the petitioner, this difference in soil types leads to a very unique and distinct "terroir" for the Long Island viticultural area—-sandy loams will warm up faster, drain better, and allow deeper root penetration than soils in bordering areas, which contain greater amounts of silt, clay and rock. The soils of the Long Island viticultural area are fairly uniform in that they are predominately glacial till and glacial outwash in nature, are very low in organic matter, and contain few, if any, large mineral deposits or exposed rock formations. Many of the soil series including the Wallington, Sudbury, Scio, Montauk, Plymouth and Riverhead Soil Series are common throughout the entire viticultural area.
One of the most distinctive features of the Long Island viticultural area is the vast quantity of sandy loam soil deposited during the Pleistocene Epoch of the Quaternary Period. This soil was deposited during the last four major glacial stages of this Epoch. From oldest to youngest they are: Nebraskan, Kansan, Illoian, and Wisconsin. Because of this, the area between the surface soil and bedrock areas is several hundred feet. By contrast, the nearest surface bedrock begins near the Queens County line. Some areas of Queens show exposed bedrock formations while the bedrock layer in the Long Island viticultural area can be as much as 500 feet (152 m) below the surface. For this reason, the soils found in Queens County are much shallower than the typical soils found in the viticultural area and are not suitable for growing grapes. In addition, Queens County, which is considered part of New York City, is completely urbanized and contains essentially no agricultural land. Most of the soil series now identified in Queens are known as anthropgenic soils. These soils are described as having properties that are dominantly derived from human activities. Out of the 30 soil types found in the region of Queens County, only three are also found in the Long Island viticultural area.
