= Brotherhood Winery =

- U.S. National Register of Historic Places
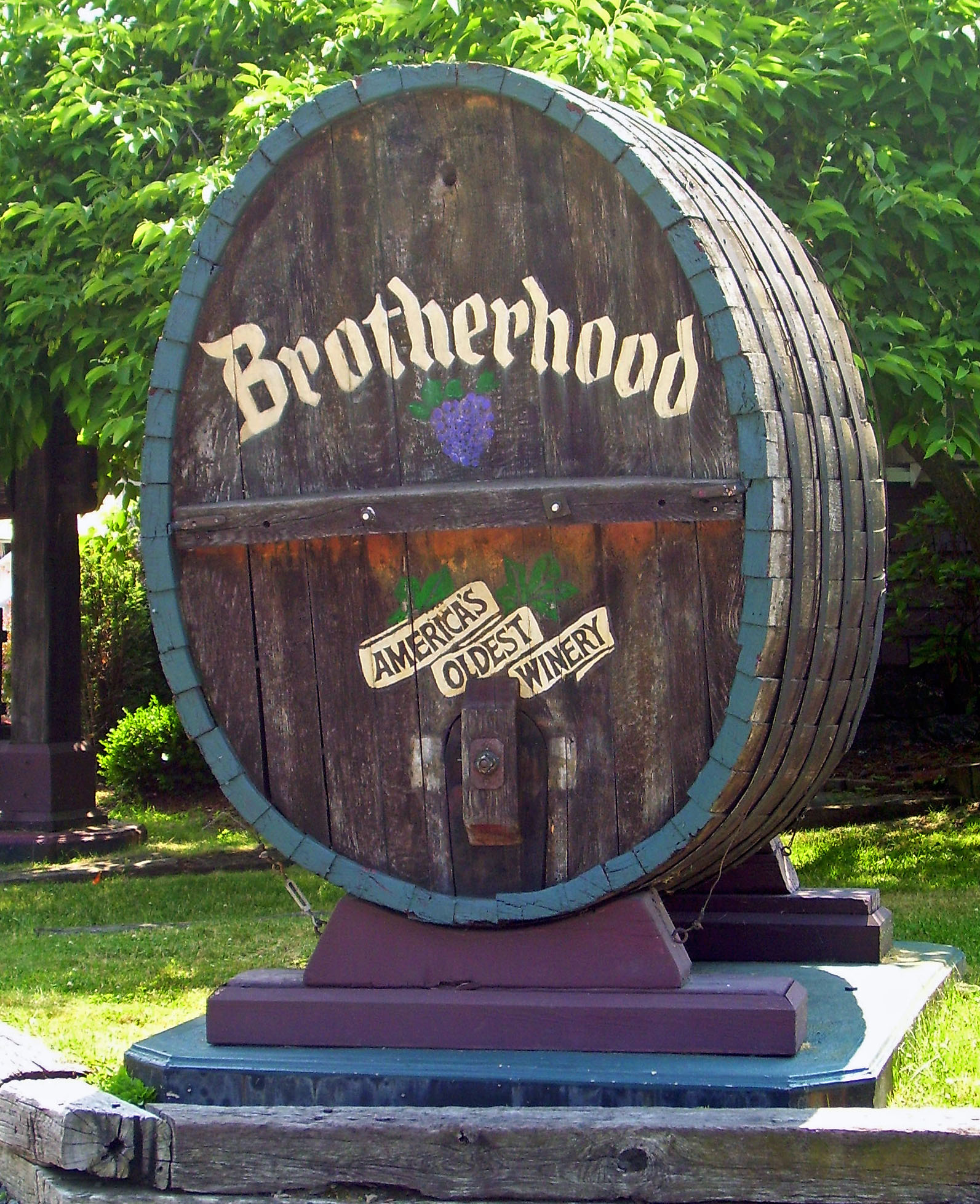
- Sign painted on wine barrel at Brotherhood Winery
- Location: Washingtonville, NY
- Nearest city: Newburgh
- Coordinates: 41°25′42″N 74°09′41″W
- Built: 1838
- Website: brotherhood-winery.com
- NRHP reference No.: 00000345
- Added to NRHP: 2000

Brotherhood Winery is a winery located in Washingtonville, New York, in the Hudson River Valley approximately 50 miles northwest of New York City. It was founded in 1816 by a French immigrant, Jean Jacques, and produced its first commercial vintage in 1839; as such, it is commonly acknowledged to be the oldest operating winery in the United States. In 2000 it was added to the National Register of Historic Places.

== History ==
Brotherhood Winery was started by Jean Jaques, who deeded it in 1858 to his three sons, John Jr., Oren, and Charles, who later renamed it "Jaques Brothers' Winery". In 1886, James M. Emerson and his son, Edward R., acquired the winery from Charles, the last surviving Jaques brother. The Emersons renamed the operation "Brotherhood" and expanded its facilities to include the single remaining original building on the winery's property, as well as adding large underground winemaking facilities. Edward wrote the book The Story of the Vine while in ownership of Brotherhood.

The winery remained in operation during Prohibition as it produced sacramental wine for the Catholic Church. New ownership came in 1921 with Louis Farrell and his son Louis Jr. The Farrells owned the winery until 1947, when both the father and son died in close succession. Control of the winery passed to three Farrell cousins. Francis Farrell was the cousin who ran the vineyard through the World War II era. An expansion included visitor tour facilities and recognition for award-winning wines in regional wine competitions.

The most recent change of ownership occurred in 1987 when Cesar Baeza purchased the winery. Baeza established vineyards on Long Island during the 1990s. The cabernet sauvignon and merlot planted there and produced into wine are standouts on their sales list.

== Wines ==
Prior to its change in ownership the winery was known for its Vitis labrusca (or "native North American grape")-based wines, with some seasoned with fresh herbs and spices based on 19th-century formulas. The spiced "Holiday" wine has been a winery best seller for many years. The winery also produces specialty wines, including one flavored with ginseng and a May wine with sweet strawberry flavors. The winery also produces a version of wine similar to mead made from wildflower honey and an Ethiopian-style honey wine (Tej) named "Sheba Te'j Honey Wine".

In the 1970s the winery began producing wines made from French hybrid grapes, which the winery still sells. Under the ownership of Cesar Baeza the winery has begun creating wines from Vitis vinifera (or historic European) grapes. These include wines made from the cabernet sauvignon, pinot noir, merlot, chardonnay, riesling and zinfandel grapes (producing in the latter instance a white zinfandel wine).

== See also ==
- Agoston Haraszthy
- California wine
- Hudson River Region AVA
- New York wine
