= Stanley Wagner (winemaker) =

American winemaker

Stanley "Bill" Wagner
- Born: May 10, 1927; Elmira, New York
- Died: June 26, 2010 (aged 83); Lodi, New York
- Occupation(s): Winemaker, Winery owner
- Known for: Helping develop the New York wine industry.
- Children: 3

Stanley Arthur "Bill" Wagner (April 10, 1927 – June 26, 2010) was an American winemaker who, in the 1970s, became one of the earliest winemakers to establish a vineyard in the Finger Lakes region of Upstate New York, in an area that would eventually become the Seneca Lake AVA. In addition to his award-winning wines, Wagner also established a microbrewery that produced pilsner, lager, ale and stout.

== Biography ==
Wagner was born on April 10, 1927, in Elmira, New York. Both his parents and grandparents had been grape farmers, and he grew up in Lodi, New York, only one-half mile from where he established his vineyards. Wagner dropped out of high school to join the United States Navy during World War II, but the war ended before he could see combat.

He became a dairy farmer after completing his military service, but by the mid-1950s he had returned to the family tradition of growing grapes. In the 1970s, Wagner lobbied on behalf of the New York Farm Winery Act of 1976 that fostered the creation of wineries in New York State. Wagner Vineyards was established in 1979, at a time when there were barely a dozen wineries in the Finger Lakes region. The winery took three years to construct, as most of the work was done by Wagner and his family. Wagner's first vintage was in 1978, and its initial varieties were white wines, such as chardonnay, gewürztraminer and riesling. A 1981 review of a chardonnay in The New York Times called the wine "a rich and creamy white, full in body", with the characteristics of "some of the great white Burgundies of France".

Later, Wagner Vineyards became known for its red wines, including Cabernet Sauvignon, Merlot and Pinot noir. In addition to a restaurant, Wagner opened the Wagner Valley Brewing Company in 1997, producing a range of beers including pilsner, lager, ale and stout. He opened branch locations in New York City, Syracuse, New York and the Thousand Islands, once state law had been revised to allow such operations. In the 1990s, Wagner had worked on a study with researchers from Cornell University measuring the levels of resveratrol in the wine and printed on neck tags to let buyers know about the positives of consuming the wine and its antioxidants, but federal authorities revoked the winery's ability to identify possible health benefits.

A resident of Lodi, New York, Wagner died at his home there at age 83 on June 26, 2010, after what was described as a "brief illness". Wagner credited his longevity to his consumption of a glass of his own Pinot Noir every night at dinner, continuing to note that "I exercise and eat right, too. But the wine helps, no question." He was survived by a daughter, two sons and six grandchildren.
