= Lakemont (grape) =

Variety of grape

Lakemont is a white table grape, part of the "Three Sisters" group, consisting of Himrod, Lakemont, and Interlaken. All are named after towns in the Finger Lakes region of North America. Lakemont ripens later than the other two "sisters", but it is sweeter, has bigger fruit, and a slightly different flavor. Some nurseries claim that Lakemont is more productive than Himrod and Interlaken.
