= Himrod =

Variety of grape

- Grape (Vitis)
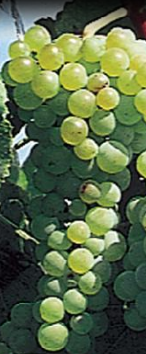
- Color of berry skin: Blanc
- Species: 75% Vitis vinefera × 25% Vitis labrusca
- Also called: NY 15310
- Origin: New York Agricultural Experiment Station
- Notable regions: United States
- VIVC number: 5396

Himrod is a white table grape, released in 1952 by the New York Agricultural Experiment Station in Geneva, New York. It is seedless and known for its sweet flavor and ripening quickly. Himrod is considered very productive and reliable.

Himrod resulted from a cross of Ontario by Thompson Seedless, a particularly successful cross which resulted in the eventual release of four cultivars, the others being Interlaken, Romulus, and Lakemont. All were named for towns in the Finger Lakes region, near Geneva, New York. These grapes are all quite productive, but they have some differences.

== See also ==
- Lakemont (grape)
