= Melody (grape) =

Variety of grape

- Grape (Vitis)
- Color of berry skin: White
- Also called: New York 65.444.4
- Notable regions: New York, Maryland Kansas
- VIVC number: 7614

Wine characteristics
- General: Light, high acidity

Melody is a hybrid white wine grape variety produced from a cross of Seyval blanc and a grape called Geneva White 5, which is itself a cross between Pinot blanc and Ontario. Melody produces a light white with notes of peach and honeysuckle, and refreshing acidity, even at low sugar levels (0.7%-0.6% RS).

The grape is noted for its resistance to powdery mildew and Botrytis, although downy mildew has been noted on leaves and clusters. It grows well in both sandy and clay loam soils.

== Regions ==
Melody is grown in the Finger Lakes AVA, with the first commercial plantings in New York being made at Wagner vineyards by Stanley "Bill" Wagner in 1984, with the first vintage released with grapes grown in 1986. The grape was also commercially planted in Maryland.

Currently, the grape produces wine commercially in several states, including Kansas and New York.
