= Musqué =

French term applied to grapes varieties

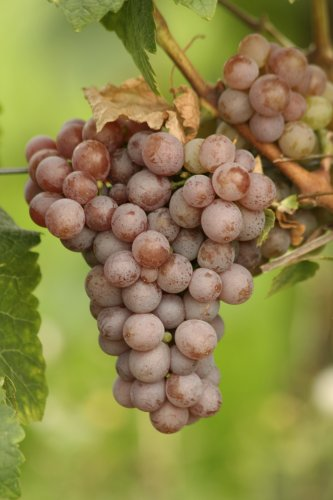
Gewürztraminer is an example of a musqué grape

Musqué is a French term applied to certain varieties or clones of grapes used for making wine. The term means both perfumed ("musky") and Muscat-like, and indicates that the variety or clone is highly aromatic. The term musqué is usually suffixed to the name of certain grape varieties to indicate a clone with musqué properties, e.g. "Chardonnay musqué" or "Sauvignon blanc musqué". Such clones have arisen through mutation of a regular ("non-musqué") clone of the variety, and such mutations have been recorded for several different grape varieties.

The most well-known musqué grape is Gewürztraminer, which is a musqué mutation of a red-skinned Traminer, which is also known as Savagnin rose in France. Since the musqué Gewürztraminer has largely replaced non-musqué Traminer, it is generally considered a grape variety in its own right rather than a clone of Traminer or Savagnin.

The issue of whether the musqué mutations, with their distinct aromatic properties should be classified as varieties in their own right, and be allowed to be used for varietal wine labelling has created bureaucratic problems for some winemakers.
