= Seneca Lake AVA =

American Viticultural Area in New York

Coordinates: 42°31′21″N 76°52′41″W

Seneca Lake
- Wine region
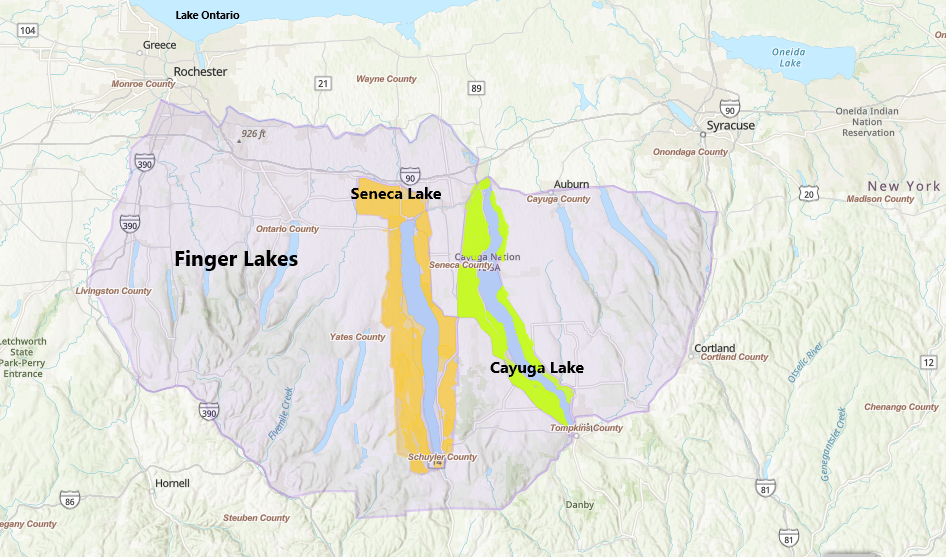
- Type: American Viticultural Area
- Year established: 2003
- Years of wine industry: 49
- Country: United States
- Part of: New York, Finger Lakes AVA
- Other regions in New York, Finger Lakes AVA: Cayuga Lake AVA
- Growing season: 190 days
- Soil conditions: Various layers of shale, sand & limestone with a shallow layer of topsoil
- Total area: 204,600 acres (319.7 sq mi)
- Size of planted vineyards: 3,756 acres (1,520 ha)
- Grapes produced: Baco noir, Cabernet Franc, Cabernet Sauvignon, Catawba, Cayuga, Chardonnay, Delaware, Gewurztraminer, Melody, Merlot, Niagara, Pinot noir, Riesling and Sangiovese
- No. of wineries: 52

Seneca Lake (/sɛnɛkæ/ Se-ne-ca) is an American Viticultural Area (AVA) surrounding Seneca Lake, the largest of the eleven Finger Lakes in upstate New York, approximately 35 miles (56 km) south of Lake Ontario within portions of Seneca, Ontario, Schuyler and Yates counties. It was established as the nation's 149^{th} and the state's seventh appellation on July 3, 2003 by the Alcohol and Tobacco Tax and Trade Bureau (TTB), Treasury after reviewing the petition submitted by Ms. Beverly Stamp of Lakewood Vineyards in Watkins Glen, New York, on behalf of herself and local vintners proposing the viticultural area named "Seneca Lake." The area also was the second sub-appellation designated within the long established Finger Lakes viticultural area.

Effective January 24, 2003, the Homeland Security Act of 2002 divided the Bureau of Alcohol, Tobacco and Firearms (ATF) into two new agencies, the Alcohol and Tobacco Tax and Trade Bureau (TTB) in Treasury and the Bureau of Alcohol, Tobacco, Firearms, and Explosives (BATFE) in the Department of Justice (DOJ). The regulation and taxation of alcohol beverages remained a function of the Treasury and the responsibility of TTB. References to the former ATF and the new TTB reflects the time frame, before or after January 24, 2003.

Seneca Lake is a glacial lake about 35 miles (56 km) long and up to 600 feet (180 m) deep. The lake does not freeze in winter, and acts as a giant heat storage unit for the vineyards surrounding the lake, extending the growing season. The most commercially important grape variety in the region is Riesling, although a wide variety of vitis vinifera and French hybrid grapes are grown. In 1977, Glenora Wine Cellars was the first winery established in the Seneca Lake region. Other wineries soon followed, including Hermann J. Wiemer Vineyard and Wagner Vineyards Estate Winery, established by Stanley Wagner in 1979. At the outset, Seneca Lakes viticultural area covered approximately 204,600 acres (319.7 sq mi) of primarily rural agricultural and forestland with about 3,756 acres (1,520 ha) cultivating grapes with 33 wineries adjacent to Seneca Lake.

== History ==
Seneca Lake was named after the indigenous Seneca people of the Iroquois Nation who lived along its shores hundreds of years ago. The Iroquois were the first to utilize the microclimates created by the lake's varying water temperatures planting fruit crops which flourished. Later, European settlers planted only what they needed to survive or use for local barter, until the opening of the Erie Canal. Backyard fruit trees and arbors quickly grew into commercial orchards and vineyards.

The viticultural history of the Finger Lakes region began in 1829, when William Warner Bostwick, the Episcopal minister at Hammondsport, received Vitis labrusca shoots from his father-in-law in Massachusetts. Bostwick planted them in his rectory garden located in Hammondsport, New York on the southern tip of Keuka Lake. He distributed Catawba and Isabella grapes cuttings to parishioners and soon offshoots from his vineyards spread throughout the region. Cultivation later became commercial to meet an accelerated demand in the eastern urban markets. Commercial viticulture officially began in 1862, when the Hammondsport and Pleasant Valley Wine Companies were founded. Two more companies were formed three years later. The region became famous for its sparkling wines, with the Pleasant Valley Wine Company winning European awards in 1867 and 1873. These successes spurred growth in commercial plantings in the area, and by the end of the century there was 25,000 acres (10,000 ha) planted.

In 1866, the western shores of Seneca Lake became home to its first winery, the Seneca Lake Grape Wine Company. The winery planted 100 acres (40 ha) of grapes. At the time, it was the largest vineyard in the state. By 1869, they were producing 14,000 US gallons (53,000 L) of Seneca Lake's first commercial wine. Then, in 1882, New York State opened its Agricultural Experiment Station in Geneva, New York located at the north end of Seneca Lake. Its grape breeding and research programs helped to substantiate Seneca Lake as a prominent player in the grape growing industry. By 1900 there were over 20,000 acres (8,100 ha) of vineyards throughout the Finger Lakes and more than 50 wineries.

In 1919, the passage of Prohibition almost dealt a fatal blow to the entire regional enterprise. Seventeen wineries operated in the region in 1917. but after the Volstead Act was enacted, only four survived: Great Western, Gold Seal, Taylor, and Widmer. Taylor purchased a fifth, Columbia, anticipating the eventual Repeal of Prohibition. These wineries endured the period of restricted production by making sacramental and medicinal wines while supplying grape juice for home wine-making. A Volstead Act loophole allowed wines to be made as long as they were not sold. Many European immigrants in the northeastern cities traditionally drank wine and they kept the demand high. Only the largest wineries were able to survive by making grape juice and sacramental wine. Total area of Finger Lakes' vineyards was cut in half and many of the remaining vineyards were replanted to produce grape varieties popular for juice or for the fresh fruit market. When Prohibition was repealed, the wine and grape growing industry remained a shadow of its former self. The Seneca Lake Grape Wine Company had folded and area farmers struggled to survive in a much reduced New York State market.

The next significant change for the Seneca Lake grape growing and wine producing industry occurred during the late 1950s and 1960s. Two young European vintner pioneers named Charles Fournier and Konstantin Frank began to research and experiment with Vitis vinifera in the Finger Lakes Region. Fournier and Frank's research led them to Seneca Lake where they found the most favorable micro-climates conducive for growing Vinifera grapes. In the early 1970s, Fournier planted 20 acres (8.1 ha) of Vinifera on the east side of Seneca Lake. At the same time, a German native named Hermann Wiemer bought and planted 140 acres (57 ha) of Vinifera on the west side of Seneca Lake. The success of these two vineyards along with the establishment of a wine research program at the New York State Agricultural Experiment Station in Geneva helped to start the revitalization of Seneca Lake in the grape growing and wine producing industry.

== Terroir ==
=== Topography ===
Seneca Lake is also the second longest of the Finger Lakes, being 36.5 miles (58.7 km) long and covers 66.3 square miles (172 km^{2}). It's also the deepest of the eleven lakes measuring 634 feet (193 m) at its maximum depth. Distinct ridges divide Seneca Lake from its closest neighbor, Cayuga Lake, and the nearly 800-foot (244 m) elevation change in the 7.5 miles (12.1 km) between the lakes creates their own microclimates. Soil and climate are the primary determinants of terroir. While the Finger Lakes region does have unique features of soils and climate from other grape-producing locations around the world, grape production around each lake shares some common characteristics with other lakes within the Finger Lakes region. The differences within the region come down to the size of the lake and its nature to influence the local climate.
The "lake effect" weather phenomenon makes the Seneca Lake viticultural area a "unique and superb" wine-growing region. Lake effect is "the year-round influence on vineyards from nearby large lakes which permits vine-growing in the northeast United States and Ontario in Canada despite their high latitude." The lake effect influence on grape vines changes with the seasons. In the winter, the large lakes provide moisture to the prevailing westerly winds, which creates a deep snow cover, protecting vines from winter freeze even in very low temperatures. In spring, the westerly winds blow across the frozen lake and become cooler. These cooler breezes blowing on the vines retard bud-break until the danger of frost has passed. In summer the lake warms up. By autumn/fall, the westerly winds are warmed as they blow across the lake. The warm breezes on the vines lengthen the growing season (balancing the late start to the growing season) by delaying the first frost.
The petitioner also provided extracts from Richard Figiel's book "Culture in a Glass: Reflections on the Rich Heritage of Finger Lakes Wine," that describes how the lake effect phenomenon affects the Finger Lakes region. Noting that both Seneca and Cayuga Lakes drop well below sea level, the lakes are "(n)arrow slices of water with relatively little surface area, they tend to maintain a stable temperature throughout the year." Figiel notes that the depth and heat storing capacity of the lakes act as a large radiator for the surrounding area during the winter months. "Not only do the lakes take the edge off frigid upstate winters, often keeping vineyards 10 to 15 °F (−12 to −9 °C) warmer than locations just one-half mile (0.80 km) away," the book adds, "but they also cushion the transitions of spring and fall." Figiel also points out that the "(d)istinct microclimates along the hillsides rising from the lakeshores make it possible to reliably ripen grapes in a region that is generally too cold for viticulture."

=== Climate ===
The petitioner stated that it is the size and depth of Seneca Lake that gives the lake its ability to influence the local climate. Additionally, a report provided by the petitioner, entitled "Viticultural Distinction of Seneca Lake in the New York Finger Lakes," includes a physical description of Seneca Lake. The report states that, "Seneca Lake is the largest of the Finger Lakes covering 67.7 square miles (175 km^{2}). The lake is 35.1 miles (56.5 km) long and is an average of 1.9 miles (3.1 km) wide with a shoreline of 75.4 miles (121.3 km). It has a volume of 4.2 trillion gallons with a maximum depth of 634 feet (193 m). At 150 feet (46 m), the water temperature remains at 39 °F (4 °C) year around. Above that level, the water temperature varies seasonally, but the surface temperature generally does not go below 39.5 °F (4.2 °C)." While Seneca Lake chills down, it rarely freezes during the winter months. The petition also noted that the Seneca region has the longest frost-free period in the Finger Lakes, with a growing season of about 190 days. In contrast, neighboring Cayuga Lake's growing season is only 165 to 170 days long. Seneca Lake's latent heat storage capacity alters the local climate to such an extent that grapes can be grown in an area where they otherwise would not survive the cold temperatures of early spring, or the late autumn frosts. Together with the good air drainage offered by the slopes leading to its shore, the lake's water temperature provides cool breezes in the spring, preventing early bud break in the fruit. In the fall, the lake's warmth delays early frosts, and in the winter it raises temperatures so that bud damage is lessened. According to the petition, it is this ability to protect a crop from extreme temperatures during both the growing and dormant seasons that distinguishes the Seneca Lake viticultural area from the surrounding areas. This lake effect is strongest within about one-half mile (0.80 km) of Seneca Lake. For this reason, the more tender vinifera varieties are planted within this zone, while hardier American varieties and hybrids can be planted higher on the slopes. The petitioner added that smaller lakes, even those the size of Cayuga Lake, do not have the same level of latent heat capacity and, therefore, do not modify the local climate to the same extent as Seneca Lake. The warmest temperatures are along the southeastern section of the lake where the warmed air moving from the north-northwest pushed up along the shoreline actually keep the vines from freezing. The USDA plant hardiness zones range from 6a to 6b.

=== Soils ===
The underlying bedrock of the Finger Lakes is a principally limestone and shale in the north and sandstone and shale in the south. Although the bedrock gradually changes from the remnants of the Allegheny Plateau to the south and southwest, to the Lake Ontario Plain to the north and northeast, the lakes do share common bedrock, especially Seneca and Cayuga. The soils around Seneca Lake consist of various types and many are excellent for fruit. The effect of numerous glacial advances and retreats is expressed in the soil types. There are well-drained gravelly loam near the lake from glacial outwash. There are various layers of shale, sand & limestone with a shallow layer of topsoil. Seneca Lake was created by the glacial action over a million years ago during the Pleistocene epoch. The moving ice masses deposited a shallow layer of topsoil on sloping shale beds above the lake, providing drainage crucial for grape growing. The band of limestone and shale around the northern portion of Seneca Lake giving a higher pH to the soil. Moving south the soil tends to have a lower pH.

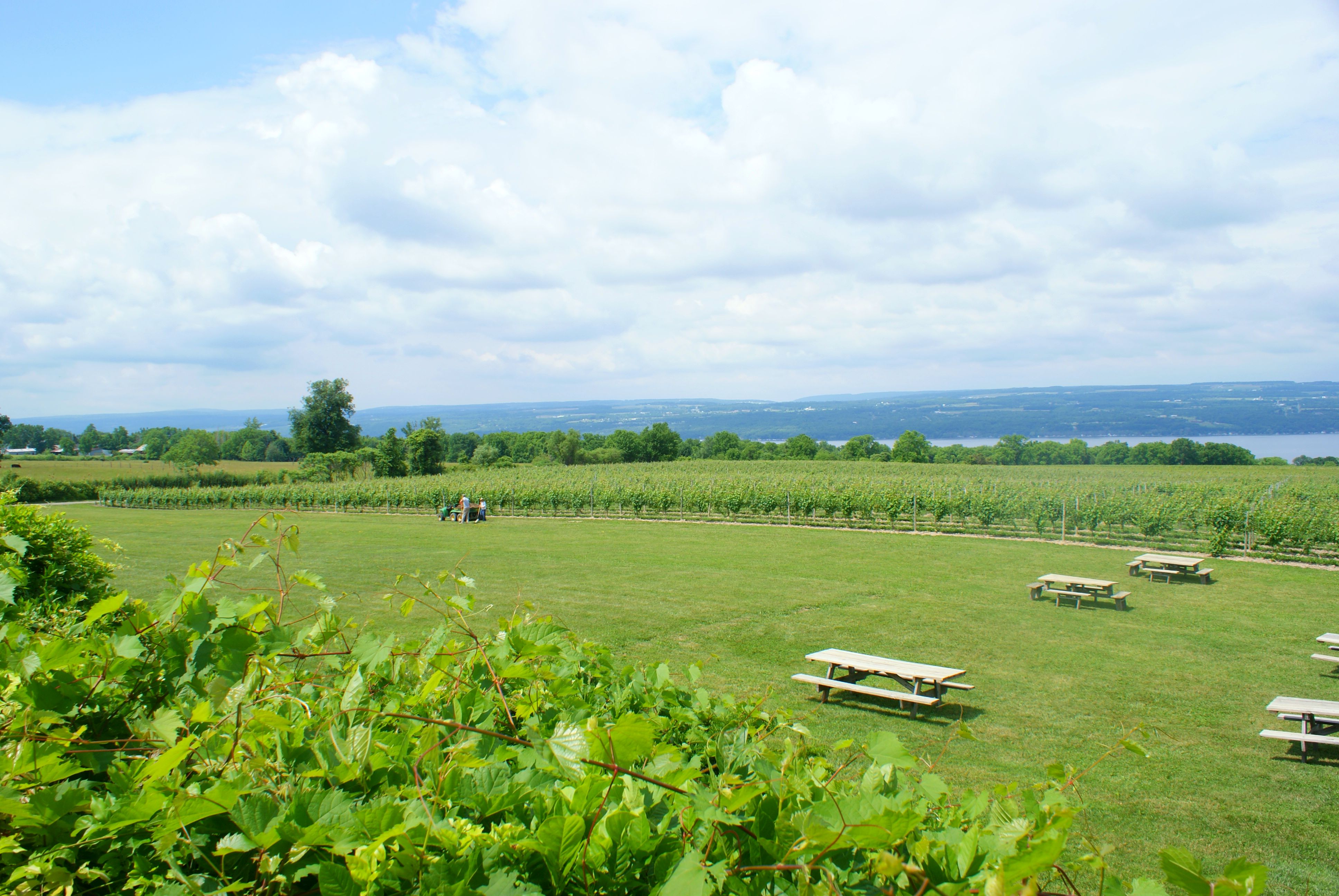
Seneca Lake vineyards

== Viticulture ==
Seneca Lake, encircled by more than three dozen wineries, is one of the two largest Finger Lakes and the deepest with the greatest heat storing capacity offering the surrounding hillsides the strongest mesoclimatic benefit. While the lake's first winery was built in 1866, the 1980s saw a wave of winery openings when the introduction of vinifera varieties energized momentum to the region's grape-growing industry.
