= Cayuga Lake AVA =

American Viticultural Area in New York

Coordinates: 42°34′27″N 76°39′04″W

Cayuga Lake
- Wine region
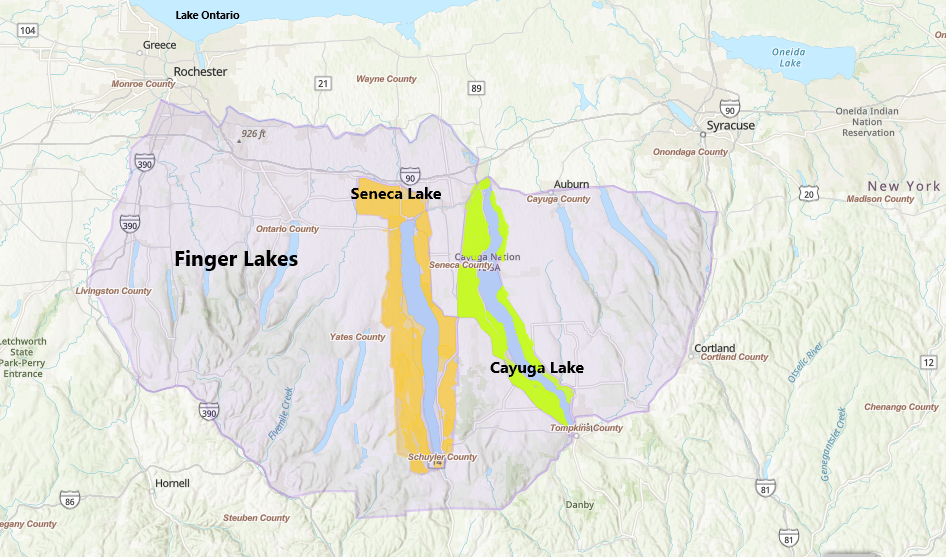
- Type: American Viticultural Area
- Year established: 1988
- Years of wine industry: 51
- Country: United States
- Part of: New York, Finger Lakes AVA
- Other regions in New York, Finger Lakes AVA: Seneca Lake AVA
- Growing season: 165–170 days
- Climate region: Region Ib
- Heat units: 2,400-2,500 GDD units
- Precipitation (annual average): 28 to 35 in (710–890 mm)
- Soil conditions: Deep, well drained to moderately drained soils and heavy silt loam to heavy loam subsoil
- Total area: 150,000 acres (240 sq mi)
- Size of planted vineyards: 460 acres (190 ha)
- No. of vineyards: 18
- Grapes produced: Baco noir, Cabernet Franc, Cabernet Sauvignon, Catawba, Cayuga, Chambourcin, Chancellor, Chardonnay, Concord, Delaware, Diamond, Gewurztraminer, Isabella, Ives noir, Lemberger, Marechal Foch, Melody, Merlot, Niagara, Pinot gris, Pinot noir, Riesling, Sangiovese, Seyval blanc, Syrah, Traminette, Vidal blanc, Vignoles, Viognier
- No. of wineries: 20

Cayuga Lake (/kaɪˈuːɡə/ ky-OO-guh) is an American Viticultural Area (AVA) located in upstate New York approximately 35 miles (56 km) south of Lake Ontario within portions of Cayuga, Seneca, and Tompkins counties. It was established as the nation's 100^{th} and the state's sixth appellation on March 24, 1988 by the Bureau of Alcohol, Tobacco and Firearms (ATF), Treasury after reviewing the petition submitted by Douglas and Susanna Knapp of Knapp Farms, Inc., and Robert Plane of Plane's Cayuga Vineyard, Inc., on behalf of themselves and local vintners, proposing a viticultural area to be named "Cayuga Lake."

The region is located north of the city of Ithaca, adjacent to and encompasses Cayuga Lake, the longest at 38 miles (61 km), and second largest of the eleven Finger Lakes, lying between Seneca Lake and Owasco Lake, within the established Finger Lakes appellation. At the outset, the 240 square miles (150,000 acres) Cayuga Lake viticultural area included eight bonded wineries and 18 vineyards cultivating approximately 460 acres (190 ha).

Most of the AVA's vineyards are located in shale soils on hillsides along the lake's western side. Vineyard elevations range from 800 feet (240 m) and higher above the lake surface. The steep hillsides and the lake together form a unique micro-climate extending the growing season by preventing cold air from settling and producing frost. The Cayuga grape variety was created from this region by Cornell University researchers.

== History ==
The body of water called Cayuga Lake received its name from the indigenous Cayuga people of the Iroquois Nation who lived in the region hundreds of years ago. The name also figures prominently in identifying the area in the diaries of Major-General John Sullivan during his campaign to open upstate New York land to settlers. Cayuga Lake is the name used by the first permanent settlers in Seneca County in 1789 and has remained the same to the present time. It is found in the Cornell University anthem which begins "High above Cayuga's waters...". There is no other name that can be applied to the specific area described in the petition.

The viticultural history of the Finger Lakes region began in 1829, when William Warner Bostwick, the Episcopal minister at Hammondsport, received Vitis labrusca vines from his father-in-law in Massachusetts. Bostwick planted them in his rectory garden located in Hammondsport, New York on the southern tip of Keuka Lake. He distributed the Catawba and Isabella grapes cuttings to parishioners and offshoots from his vineyards spread throughout the region. Cultivation later became commercial to meet the accelerated demand in the eastern urban markets. The first recorded shipment of grapes outside the locale was to New York City in 1847. Wine making dates from 1853, when a German immigrant planted two acres (1 ha) with Isabella and Catawba. The wine he made received a positive reception, and the industry was underway. By 1860, there were 200 acres (81 ha) of vineyards around Keuka Lake.
Commercial viticulture officially began in 1862 when the Hammondsport and Pleasant Valley Wine Companies were founded. The region became famous for its sparkling wines, with the Pleasant Valley Wine Company winning European awards in 1867 and 1873. These successes spurred growth in commercial plantings in the area, and by the end of the century there was 25,000 acres (10,000 ha) planted. In addition to the original Isabella and Catawba vines other types of labrusca were planted. Delaware, Concord, and Niagara were well adapted to the cold winters, resisted diseases that had nullified all experiments with vinifera varieties in the eastern United States, and thrived on the acidic soils of the region. The steep slopes to the lake, which discouraged other commercial uses, provided a favorable micro-climate for the vines. As in many European areas, grapes flourished where little else of value would. The Hammondsport and Pleasant Valley Wine Company was founded the same year. Its first crush of some eighteen tons of grapes occurred in 1862. Three years later, the Crooked Lake and Urbana Wine Company was established to sell under the Imperial label. Both companies achieved fame almost instantaneously, especially with their sparkling wines. Pleasant Valley won European awards in 1867 and 1873 and was identifying itself as the "Rheims of America" after the famous city in Champagne. With its sparkling wine being referred to as the "great champagne" of the Western world, the company changed its name to Great Western in 1871. Two Imperial wines won gold medals at the 1876 Paris International Exposition, and in 1887 the company renamed itself Gold Seal. In the wake of those successes, vineyard acreage increased around Keuka Lake from 3,000 in 1870 to 5,000 in 1879. Expansion continued during the 1880s. Walter Taylor added his name to the list of pioneers for the industry. His vineyard north of Hammondsport joined Great Western and Gold Seal as one of the three firms that came to dominate regional wine making. Expansion of table-grape production continued, with Baltimore and Philadelphia becoming important outlets. By 1889, vineyard plantings around Keuka Lake totaled 14,000 acres (5,700 ha), and by the end of the century the figure was 25,000 acres (10,000 ha). Steamboats carried harvested grapes across the lake to the railroad spur built specifically between Hammondsport and Bath for the grape and wine industry. To the west a secondary center of production developed around the Naples valley at the southern end of Canandaigua Lake, where grape growing had commenced shortly after 1850. Maxfield Cellars was established there in 1861. In 1882 John Widmer planted his vineyard in the same locale, and he released his first wines in 1888 when the O-Neh-Da Vineyard was established along the western side of Hemlock Lake. On the property of the Roman Catholic see of Rochester, the vineyard made sacramental wines for the parish clergy. Other wineries waxed and waned during the early years of the twentieth century, but the Finger Lakes region generally enjoyed a reputation for excellent sparkling wines and reliable good-quality table wines for the American market. The association with wine production was boosted by a decline in the acreage devoted to table grapes. Refrigerated railroad cars brought grapes from California to eastern markets, and the high yields attainable in the Central Valley meant prices that were well below what Finger Lakes growers charged. The fortunes of vineyards henceforth were tied to wine rather than other grape products.

The era of Prohibition almost dealt a fatal blow to the entire regional enterprise. Seventeen wineries operated in the region in 1917. but after the Volstead Act was enacted, only four survived: Great Western, Gold Seal, Taylor, and Widmer. Taylor purchased a fifth, Columbia, anticipating the eventual Repeal of Prohibition. These wineries endured the period of restricted production by making sacramental and medicinal wines while supplying grape juice for home wine-making. A Volstead Act loophole allowed wines to be made as long as they were not sold. Many European immigrants in the northeastern cities traditionally drank wine and they kept the demand high. Again, California provided stiff competition, because the preference was for wines made from vinifera grapes rather than labrusca varieties. The latter have very strong "grapey" flavors and aromas, commonly referred to as "foxy," that tend to dominate the wines and to make them less satisfactory with meals. Also labrusca grapes are low in natural sugars and must be chaptalized for the juice to reach desired alcoholic levels. Consequently, vinifera grapes from California increasingly predominated the home-wine market.

A number of factors, including phylloxera, competition from California, and Prohibition, combined to cause a decline in Finger Lakes region's commercial viticulture production in the early 20th century. Production resumed on a smaller scale after Prohibition was repealed. After World War II, American soldiers returning from the European theatre had acquired a taste for drier wines from vitis vinifera varieties, in contrast to the sweeter wines from native American grape varieties. Unlike California growers, Finger Lakes growers were unable to cultivate Vitis vinifera in the harsh winters experimenting with French-American hybrid varieties with limited success. A major milestone in Finger Lakes viticulture occurred when Dr. Konstantin Frank, a Ukrainian immigrant with a PhD in plant science, came to work for the Cornell University Geneva Experiment Station in 1951. Commercial growers and researchers at the Geneva Experiment Station were convinced that European Vitis vinifera varieties were not able to grow in the harsh Finger Lakes climate. After years of successfully growing Vitis vinifera in the cold Ukrainian climate, Dr. Frank was sure that it could be grown in the Finger Lakes if grafted onto the proper, cold-hardy native rootstock. He proved this in 1962 by opening Vinifera Wine Cellars in Hammondsport cultivating and winemaking from Vitis vinifera grapes such as Riesling, Chardonnay, Pinot noir, Gewürztraminer, and Cabernet Sauvignon, from these grafts. Plantings of his Vitis vinifera varieties spread throughout the region, reinvigorating Finger Lakes' viticulture industry growth and popularity.

The first winery in the Cayuga Lake area was founded in 1980, although grapes were grown on the lakeside hills since 1975 and sourcing Hammondsport wineries. In 1981, four wineries in the region created the Cayuga Lake Wine Trail, the first enotourism venture in New York state. In 1988, the Cayuga Lakes appellation was established as the first sub-appellation within Finger Lakes granted AVA status.

== Terroir ==
=== Topography ===
The Cayuga Lake basin is one of two major land formations in the Finger Lakes that resulted from glacial activity in the Pleistocene epoch. The Cayuga Lake basin is separated from the second major basin, Seneca Lake, west of Cayuga Lake, by both topography and soil type. The topography separating Cayuga Lake Basin and Seneca Lake Basin from the town of Fayette south to the town of Ovid is low, poorly-drained pockets and from the town of Ovid south, increasing elevations rise well above the temperature moderating effects of Cayuga and Seneca Lakes. The maximum elevation within the viticultural area is no more than 800 feet (240 m) above the surface of Cayuga Lake. The elevation of the areas to the east, west and south of the viticultural area is 1,000 to 2,000 feet (300–610 m). The large state park located in the northern section of the viticultural area is named Cayuga Lake State Park. State Route 89, which runs the length of the viticultural area, is also known as Cayuga Lake Boulevard.

=== Climate ===
The micro-climate of the viticultural area is created by both Cayuga Lake and its adjacent hills. Due to the cold air drainage down, the valley slopes in summer, and the release of heat stored in Cayuga Lake, the risk of an early frost is reduced. This results in an extended growing season on the slopes, from an average of 145 days for much of the Finger Lakes region, to between 165 and 170 days for the Cayuga Lake viticultural area. The moderating effects of Cayuga Lake and its adjacent hills have resulted in the viticultural area having an extended heat summation period, from 2,200 to 2,300 degree days (GDD) for much of the Finger Lakes region, to 2,400–2,500 degree days for the Cayuga Lake viticultural area.

At 382 feet (116 m) above sea level, Cayuga Lake is the lowest of the Finger Lakes. Because of its breadth at a maximum of 4.2 miles (6.8 km) and depth up to 431 feet (131 m), Cayuga Lake remains unfrozen throughout the winter and thus not only moderates the winter climate but also produces frost protection in the Spring and Fall. The time from the last Spring frost to the first fall frost (growing season), averages 163 days in much of the Finger Lakes. The Cayuga Lake micro-climate adds days to the season with its temperature moderating effect, but only where air drainage down the slopes to the lake is not interrupted by variations in the sloping terrain and where the elevation does not cancel the temperature moderating effect. On the Eastern shore of Cayuga Lake, the same soil group, Honeoye-Lima association, begins at the southern end of the viticultural area at Salmon Creek and extends northward to Aurora, New York. Topography, however, limits the micro-climatic impact of Cayuga Lake. Higher elevations or irregular terrain interrupts the moderating effect of Cayuga Lake along the Eastern side of the area necessitating a cut-off at Faines Creek. The USDA plant hardiness zones are 6a and 6b.

=== Soils ===
Bedrock of different kinds is the main source of soil material in New York State. Within the Cayuga Lake viticultural area, the bedrock is predominantly shale. To the north of the viticultural area, it is alternating limestone and slate formations, and to the south, it is inter-bedded sandstone and shale. The soils are developed in glacial till dominated by high lime, high pH (6.5–7.5) and have unique drainage properties. They are deep, well drained to moderately well-drained soils, and have a heavy silt loam to heavy loam subsoil.

== Active wineries ==
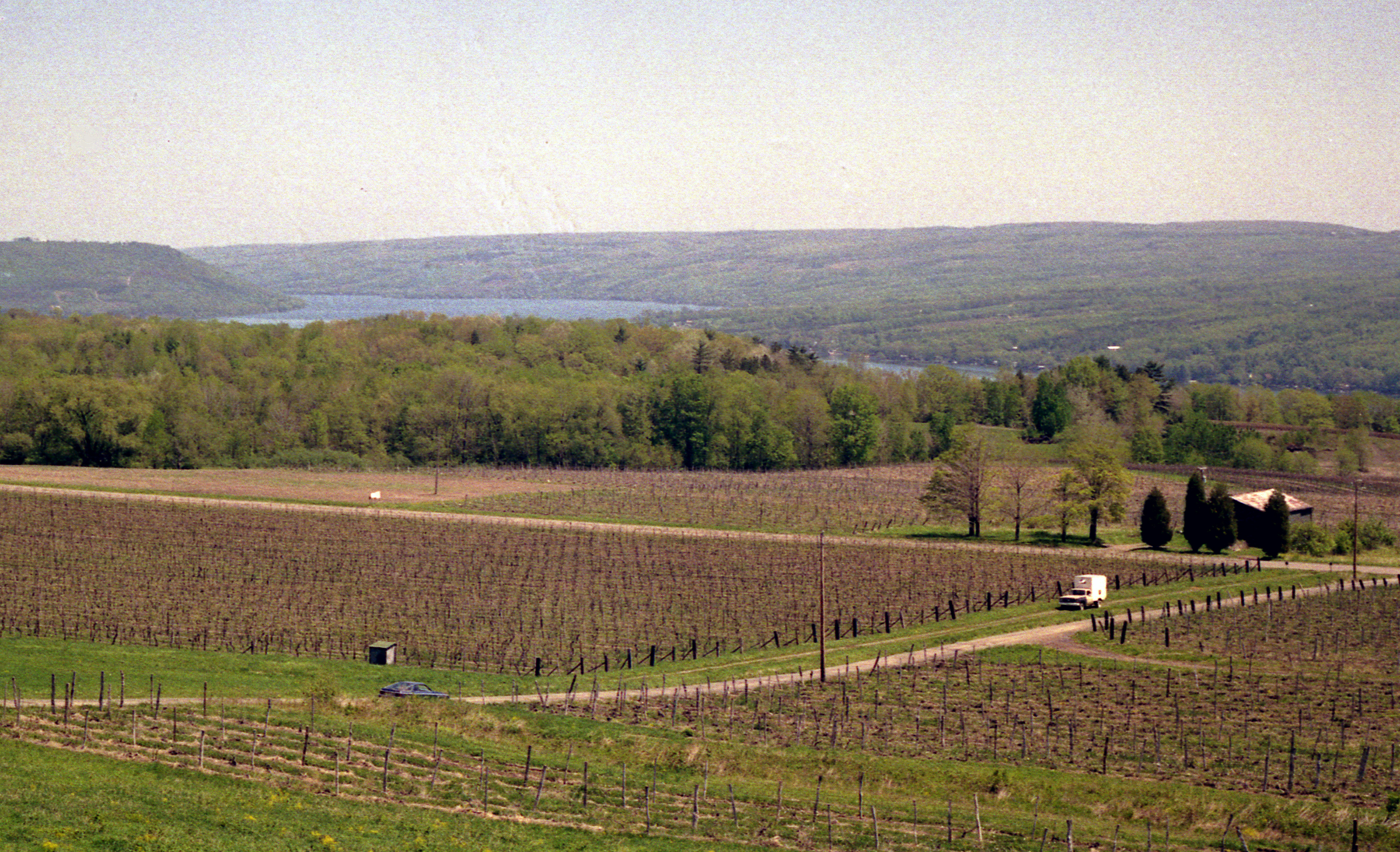
Cayuga Vineyards

Vineyard	Location	Est.	Ref
Americana Vineyards	Interlaken	1981	
Buttonwood Grove Winery	Romulus	2014	
Cayuga Ridge Estate Winery	Ovid	1981	
Hosmer Winery	Ovid	1972	
Knapp Winery	Romulus	1984	
Lucas Vineyards	Interlaken	1975	
Montezuma Winery	Seneca Falls	1999	
Six Mile Creek Vineyards	Ithaca	1987	
Swedish Hill Winery	Romulus	1986	
Thirsty Owl	Ovid	2001	
