= North Fork of Long Island AVA =

Wine growing region in New York

Coordinates: 41°02′11″N 72°30′16″W

North Fork of Long Island
- Wine region
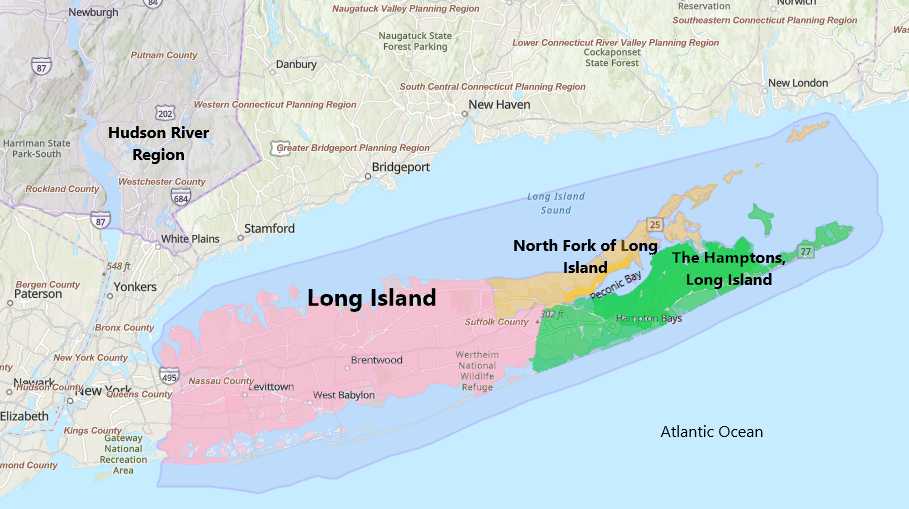
- Type: American Viticultural Area
- Year established: 1986
- Years of wine industry: 63
- Country: United States
- Part of: New York, Long Island AVA
- Other regions in New York, Long Island AVA: The Hamptons, Long Island AVA
- Growing season: 195–201 days
- Climate region: Region I-III
- Heat units: 2,572–2,987 GDD
- Precipitation (annual average): 44 in (1,100 mm)
- Soil conditions: Haven-Riverhead sandy loams
- Total area: 101,440 acres (158.5 sq mi)
- Size of planted vineyards: 3,000 acres (1,214 ha)
- No. of vineyards: 27
- Grapes produced: Cabernet Franc, Cabernet Sauvignon, Chardonnay, Chardonnay Musqué, Chenin Blanc, Gamay Beaujolais, Gewurztraminer, Malbec, Merlot, Niagara, Petit Verdot, Pinot Blanc, Pinot Meunier, Pinot Noir, Riesling, Sangiovese, Sauvignon Blanc, Semillon, Syrah/Shiraz, Viognier
- No. of wineries: 40

North Fork of Long Island is an American Viticultural Area (AVA) located in eastern Suffolk County, New York. It was established as the nation's 89^{th} and the state's fifth appellation on October 10, 1986 by the Bureau of Alcohol, Tobacco and Firearms (ATF), Treasury after reviewing the petition submitted by Richard Olsen-Harbich, Winemaker of The Bridgehampton Winery, and Alan LeBlanc-Kinne, Winemaster of Pindar Vineyards, on behalf of the Long Island Grape Growers Association, proposing a viticultural area encompassing the North Fork peninsula on Long Island to be known as "North Fork of Long Island."

The appellation consists of the townships of Riverhead, Shelter Island, and Southold including all mainland and island areas. The total land area within its boundaries covers 101,440 acres (158.5 sq mi) and resident to over 40 wineries with 27 vineyards cultivating about 3,000 acres (1,214 ha). The local climate is heavily influenced by the presence of Long Island Sound, Peconic Bay, and the Atlantic Ocean. The Maritime climate of these bodies of water help to moderate temperature fluctuations and extends the growing season up to a month longer than other New York wine regions. The most planted grape varieties in the region are Merlot, Chardonnay, and Cabernet Franc.
The largest contiguous planting of Pinot Blanc in the United States is on the North Fork AVA at Suhru & Lieb Vineyards on Oregon Road in Cutchogue. The vineyard is 54 acres (22 ha) and includes the Pinot Blanc vineyard purchased by Mark Lieb in 1999.

== History ==
According to a conversation held between the petitioner and John Wickham, a fruit farmer and pioneer Long Island grape grower whose family dates back some 300 years on the North Fork, the settlers trained the native grapes onto arbors behind their homes. According to Wickham, many of the older homes still have grape arbors. European wine grapes were not used on Long Island until the Prince Nurseries started in the late 1700's. Prince Nurseries located in the borough of Queens (New York City), sent European vinifera vines to purchasers all over Long Island, including the North Fork. The backyard arbors were pretty much the extent of grape-growing on the North Fork for the period from 1830 to 1963. There were a few attempts at commercial grape-growing on the North Fork but these failed (most notably by a Moses Fournier who in the late 1800's planted quite a large vinifera vineyard near Mattituck). According to the petitioner, the beginning of the successful commercial vineyards on the North Fork was in 1963. In that year, John Wickham planted a selection of table grapes from Cornell University. So successful was one of the varieties that it was named "Suffolk Red," for the county where it thrived. Prior to his success, vinifera grapes did not survive because of a combination of diseases. It is the petitioner's opinion that the success of John Wickham has led others to the North Fork. Interest in winegrape growing on the North Fork started slowly, but continued at an accelerated pace in late 1970s. Mr. Wickham grew grapes on the North Fork for almost 30 years until his death in 1994. Professor John Tomkins of Cornell University held conferences in the North Fork area in 1968 and 1971. In the Suffolk County Agricultural News, Volume LV, No. 5, (1971), Tomkins wrote, "There are many good sites for grapes on Long Island. Some apple and dairy farmers are taking a real careful look at the opportunities in grape-growing." The petitioner said that it was Professor Tomkins who steered Alex Hargrave to the North Fork. Hargrave Vineyard was planted in 1973. It was the first commercial vinifera vineyard on the North Fork in the 20th Century.
According to the petitioner, the North Fork of Long Island and its potential for producing quality grapes and wine, represented an opportunity for the prospective vintner. The soil and climate are suited to vinifera grape production like no other area in the Eastern United States. According to the petitioner the early results from grape plantings on the North Fork held promise for red vinifera varietals such as Carbernet Sauvignon and Merlot.

== Terroir ==
=== Topography and Climate ===
The major distinct geographical characteristic of the North Fork when comparing it with the surrounding area is its climate. More specifically, it is the Atlantic Ocean that surrounds the North Fork which makes it a distinct grape growing area. The surrounding waters render the viticultural area more temperate than many other places in the same latitude in the interior. The book North Fork and Shelter Island Guidebook, by James I. Masters, (1979), quoted Alex Hargrave in the following text:

The Sound and the Great Peconic Bay act as a natural thermostat in the spring and the fail, giving it a longer frost-free season than southern Virginia. The North Fork is a sliver of land almost completely surrounded by water. Compare this with the famous regions of Bordeaux which are on the leeward side of a river a couple of kilometers (1 mile) wide. Long Island is much more "au bord de l'eau" ([o.b'.ɔʁ.də-lo] o-b-awr-duh-lo) (at the waters edge) than Bordeaux. The growing season is 45 days longer than upstate. There are over 3,000 hours of sunlight as Cutchogue is the sunniest village in the state. Because there is virtually no fog on the North Fork, crops ripen three weeks earlier than the South Fork and danger from humidity is minimized. The constant offshore breezes control mildew as the leaf blades of the vine are dried within hours of rain. The North Fork is almost 100% photosynthetically efficient.

The viticultural area is regularly fanned by a breeze coming off the surrounding waters. The air modulates the heat in the summer and the cold in the winter. The climate classification of the North Fork is "humid continental." The ocean breezes over the viticultural area extend the period of freeze-free temperatures, reduce the range of daily and annual temperatures, and increase the amount of winter precipitation relative to summer. Although the North and South Forks of Long Island are relatively close together, there are many climatic differences which exist between these two areas. These differences are due to the unique topography of the eastern end of Long Island and the relationship of the two forks to the Atlantic Ocean and the Long Island Sound. The single most important difference between the North Fork and South Fork is the number of days between the spring and fall frosts. In data taken from local weather stations, for the period 1973-1983, the growing season averages 195 days at Riverhead (North Fork), 201 days at Greenport (North Fork) and 188 days at Bridgehampton (South Fork). In 7 out of 11 years recorded, there was anywhere from 1 to over 3 weeks longer growing season on the North Fork as compared to the South Fork. The climate on the rest of Long Island is also significantly different from the climate of the North Fork. The Long Island Sound, Atlantic Ocean, and bay areas are the main reasons for the North Fork's buffered climate. As the forks merge into the main body of Long Island, the effect of these waters is greatly diminished, especially with southwest winds prevailing. This is evident in the previous data for both Brookhaven and Patchogue. Brookhaven, located 10 miles west of the North Fork, can have as much as 50 days less growing season than Riverhead. Patchogue (located on the south shore about 20 miles (32 km) from the North Fork) can also be seen to be as much as 45 days less, with most seasons being around 1-2 weeks less than Riverhead. The data given for Mineola (a large suburban area in Nassau County about 50 miles west) and Central Park-New York City (located 60 miles west), show the increasing effect of the buffering ocean winds as the western end of the island begins to narrow once again. A great deal of the effect as well, is due to the great amount of industrial warmth supplied from what is mostly an urban area. The USDA plant hardiness zones are 7a and 7b.

=== Soils ===
The grape growing region of the North Fork when compared to the South Fork (The Hamptons), has distinctly different soil types. The difference in soil types begins north of the Peconic River and continues eastward toward Orient Point. According to the United States Soil Conservation Service, the major soil types which are found on the North Fork are as follows:

1. Carver-Plymouth-Riverhead Association.
  These soils are excessively well-drained and are very sandy, which may limit its farmability. They are located primarily on the perimeter of the North Fork and are usually rolling or sloping. The natural fertility of these soils is low and the rapid permeability of water through these soils makes irrigation a desirable option for vineyards in these areas. They are found mainly along the North Shore adjoining the Long Island Sound. Fishers and Plum Islands, although separate islands located east of the mainland of the North Fork, are composed of this same soil association.
2. Haven-Riverhead Association.
  These soils are characteristically deep and somewhat level and are located further inland on the North Fork. They are well-drained and have a medium texture. Most of these soils have a moderate to high water holding capacity and crops respond well to lime and fertilizer when grown on these soils. Due to these factors, this soil association (which is the predominant one of the North Fork) is considered one of the best farming areas in Suffolk County.
3. Montauk-Haven-Riverhead Associations.
  These soils are deep, nearly level to strongly sloping in character. They are well drained to moderately well drained soils. They tend to be moderately coarse in texture. They are the associations found on the North Fork areas of Robins and Shelter Island, located just south of the mainland.

The soils of the South Fork (The Hamptons), on the other hand, are somewhat different, and many more associations are present:

1. Plymouth-CarverAssociation.
  These soils are rolling, hilly, deep and excessively drained. Characteristically, scrub oak and other minor trees are found as cover. Permeability is rapid and natural fertility is low.
2. Bridgehampton-HavenAssociation.
  These soils are deep and excessively drained and have a medium texture.
3. Montauk-Montauk, Sandy Variant-BridgehamptonAssociation.
  These soils are deep and usually very sloping. Presently, most of this area is either idle or wooded.
4. Montauk, Sandy Variant-Plymouth Association.
  These soils are excessively drained and coarse textured. This loamy-sand is droughty but contains a black surface layer which is high in organic matter content.
5. Montauk-Haven-Riverhead Association.
  These soils are fairly well-drained and are sparsely found on the northern side of the South Fork along the Peconic Bay at Cow Neck, Noyack, North Haven, and outlying Gardiners Island. The surface layer is a silt loam, with a fine sandy loam found at deeper levels. These soils are very deep and well-suited to cultivation.

The remainder of the soils on the South Fork consist of the Dune-Land-TidalMarsh-Beach Association, which make up the beach and marshland areas. Westward from here and into New York City, the soil associations become even more foreign to those found on the eastern end of Long Island. It must also be pointed out that while various soil types found in western Long Island may be similar to those found on the North Fork, the encroachment of suburban development and industry on Long Island has made commercial agriculture and land available for it, almost non- existent in the townships west of Brookhaven. As one can see, the soils of the North Fork and the South Fork (The Hamptons) are quite different, each giving the grapes that are grown there, a distinct and unique character. At the towns of Brookhaven/Riverhead boundary line where the forks meet, there is still some slight separation of the different soil associations. West of this area, however, the soil associations of Long Island tend to become less restricted to a distinct geographic area and much more intermingling and blending of soil series can be found. Also, there are the soils making up the "spine" of Long Island, namely the "Pine Barrens." The soils of the "Pine Barrens" can support just that; short scrubby pine forests are the only vegetation in the light, extremely sandy and unfertile soils of this area.
In general, the soils of the North Fork contain a smaller percentage of silt and loam than the soil series found on the South Fork (The Hamptons). This accounts for the fact that South Fork soils have a greater water-holding capacity than North Fork soils and require less irrigation. The soils for the North Fork are also generally slightly higher in natural fertility than the soils of the South Fork.
