= The Hamptons, Long Island AVA =

Wine growing region in New York

Coordinates: 40°54′30″N 72°22′03″W

The Hamptons, Long Island
- Wine region
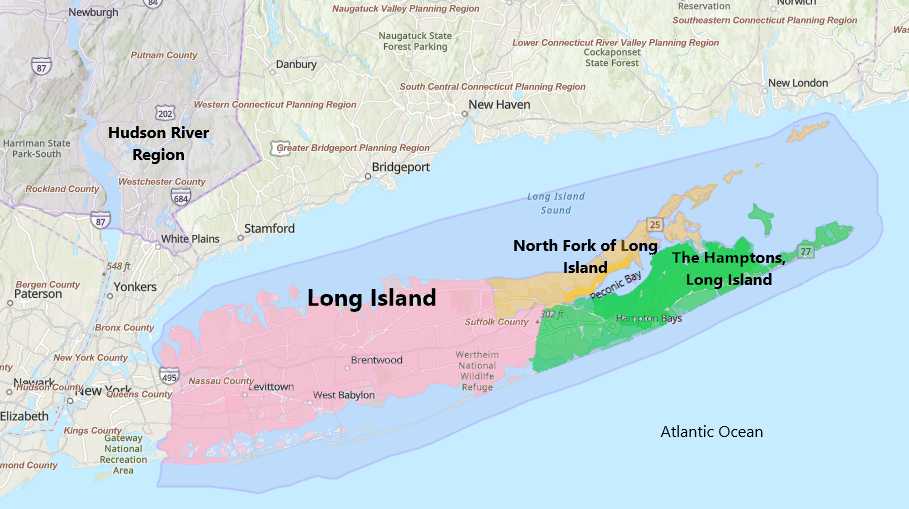
- Type: American Viticultural Area
- Year established: 1985
- Years of wine industry: 47
- Country: United States
- Part of: New York, Long Island AVA
- Other regions in New York, Long Island AVA: North Fork of Long Island AVA
- Growing season: 182 days
- Climate region: Region I-II
- Heat units: 2,403–2,575 GDD
- Precipitation (annual average): 44 in (1,100 mm)
- Soil conditions: Silt and loam
- Total area: 136,448 acres (213 sq mi)
- Size of planted vineyards: 55.5 acres (22.5 ha)
- No. of vineyards: 3
- Grapes produced: Aligote, Cabernet Franc, Cabernet Sauvignon, Chardonnay, Dornfelder, Gewurztraminer, Lemberger, Merlot, Muscat Ottonel, Pinot Blanc, Pinot Gris/Grigio, Pinot Meunier, Pinot noir, Sauvignon Blanc, Syrah, Tocai Friulano
- No. of wineries: 3
- Comments

The Hamptons, Long Island is an American Viticultural Area (AVA) located entirely within eastern Suffolk County, New York, and includes the entire South Fork of Long Island and the townships of Southampton and East Hampton including Gardiners Island. It was established as the nation's 77^{th}, the state's fourth and the island’s initial wine appellation on May 16, 1985 by the Bureau of Alcohol, Tobacco and Firearms (ATF), Treasury after reviewing the petition, authored by winemaker Richard Olsen-Harbich, and submitted by Mr. Lyle Greenfield, owner of the Bridgehampton Winery of Bridgehampton, for the land area of the South Fork of Eastern Long Island known as "The Hamptons, Long Island."

The appellation extends on Long Island’s east–west oriented peninsula approximately 54 miles (87 km) long and between one-half mile (0.8 km) and ten miles (16 km) wide. The Hamptons AVA encompasses 136,448 acres (213 sq mi) of land that is bounded on the south and east by the Atlantic Ocean. To the north is Peconic Bay which separates the North Fork peninsula from The Hamptons. To the west lies the remainder of Long Island where the two forks border each other. At the outset, there was 55.5 acres (22 ha) of vinifera grapes cultivated and one bonded winery within the viticultural area. However, as of 2025, there are three wineries and vineyards in The Hamptons. The local climate is heavily influenced by the nearby Atlantic Ocean and Peconic Bay where the region is generally cooler and more prone to fog than the northern North Fork of Long Island viticultural area. The soil is generally silt and loam.

== History ==
The first English settlers arrived around 1640 to the area now known as The Hamptons. The first town to be established in this area was Southampton which was so named for Henry Wriothesly who was the Earl of Southampton, England. The towns of East Hampton, Bridgehampton, Westhampton and Hampton Bays were established by the late eighteenth century. This area thereafter became known as "The Hamptons," obviously due to the common ending of the major town names and a desire to preserve the area's English heritage. Today this name is commonly used to describe the locality. This is evident by the many publications, businesses and landmark descriptions which use the name "The Hamptons" to distinguish this region from the rest of Long Island, New York.
For more than 300 years, The Hamptons have been a productive agricultural growing region. Wine grapes had been introduced to Eastern Long Island as early as the 18th Century. Records indicate that vineyards were flourishing in Southampton during Colonial times. Most of the grapes planted in The Hamptons region prior to the 20th Century were cultivated in relatively small vineyards; the grapes and wine which resulted from them were used principally for private consumption. Many of the local Indians, however, may have actually tended vineyards several hundred years earlier. However, in 1979, the tradition of grape-growing in The Hamptons region once again came into focus with the installation of two vinifera grape plantings. It was in this year that Lyle Greenfield of Bridgehampton and Ken Conrad of Sag Harbor each planted their own vineyard of vinifera wine grapes in Bridgehampton and Water Mill, respectively. The Bridgehampton Winery, with presses in The Hamptons viticultural area,, released two wines for sale in 1983 (Chardonnay and Riesling). At the outset, there was 55.5 acres (22 ha) of grapes growing in the viticultural area of which five acres (2 ha) are located near the Atlantic Ocean at Sagaponack in the Town of Southampton. All of the grapes are vinifera grapes and almost all of them are now producing a crop. According to the petitioner The Hamptons region had potential for vineyard expansion. Current growers were making more land available to them for potential vineyard expansion. In addition, there are still hundreds of acres of prime farmland in The Hamptons region that are available for the planting of grapes in the future All of the grapes are vinifera grapes and almost all of them are now producing a crop. According to the petitioner, The Hamptons region has potential for vineyard expansion. Current growers are making more land available to them for potential vineyard expansion. In addition, there are still hundreds of acres of prime farmland in the Hamptons region that are available for the planting of grapes in the future.

== Terroir ==
=== Topography and Climate ===
Although The Hamptons and the North Fork are relatively close together, there are many climatic differences which exist between them. These differences are due to the unique topography of the eastern end of Long Island and the relation of the two forks to the Atlantic Ocean. Most of the climatic data for the eastern end of Long Island is recorded mainly from three weather stations: The Cornell Experimental Station in northern Riverhead (located on the North Fork), the Greenport weather station (located on the North Fork), and the Bridgehampton weather station in The Hamptons (located on the South Fork). The Cornell Station at Riverhead has been recording weather data since the 1950's, while the Bridgehampton Station has been operating for almost half a century. There are definite climatic differences which exist between the two forks. The winter months are colder on the North Fork. There the colder temperatures average 1 1/2 to 2 °F (−17 to −17 °C) colder than The Hamptons. The reason is that the North Fork is further away from the Atlantic Ocean and hence does not receive the warmed southwest ocean winds that The Hamptons receive. In the winter, the prevailing winds from the southwest are warmed by the Atlantic Ocean. The ocean in the winter has a buffering effect due to its accumulation of heat from the summer and fall months. This wind will therefore buffer the temperature of The Hamptons as it passes over them, however, by the time the wind passes over the colder Peconic Bay and reaches the North Fork, it has lost much of its warmth and hence does little to buffer the temperatures of the North Fork.

By the time spring arrives on Long Island, the ocean has cooled somewhat from the low winter temperatures. Breezes coming from the south at this time of year will therefore become cooled by the ocean, and as they pass over the warming land, a fog will often be produced. This fog will often become trapped on The Hamptons due to the many hills and rolling areas which exist there. Therefore, in the springtime, the North Fork will usually have more sunshine earlier and also have a higher average temperature. This is evident by the fact that the strawberries, sweet corn and potatoes grown on the North Fork begin to grow and ripen earlier than those same crops grown in The Hamptons.

During the summer months the southern breezes coming off the cool ocean will continue to keep average temperatures of The Hamptons lower. As the winds pass over The Hamptons, they travel over the Peconic Bay, which is a smaller body of water and hence warmer. The winds absorb much of the warmth from the bay and therefore cause the average temperatures on the North Fork to be higher than The Hamptons during the summer months. During the summer, the North Fork receives a greater number of thunder and lightning storms. These storms usually arrive from the west, and are pushed over towards the North Fork by the prevailing southeast winds. During the fall, The Hamptons can also expect cooler temperatures than the North Fork, especially during the night. Otherwise, both forks have the benefit of enjoying a fall season consisting of a lot of sunshine and normal amounts of precipitation.

The ocean effect, which alters the climates of both the North and South Fork is considerably reduced west of Riverhead, where the island widens. It is this reason along with the increased blending of soil series, which would keep either fork from being considered part of a larger Long Island appellation. Although the amount of sunshine and rainfall can have an effect on the length of the growing season, the single most important factor is the number of days between the spring and fall frosts. In data taken from the Riverhead Station on the North Fork and from the Bridgehampton Station in The Hamptons (South Fork), there are definite differences in the frost dates for both forks. During the 6-year period from 1978-1983 the number of days between frosts, or the length of the growing season averaged 195 days on the North Fork and 182 days in The Hamptons. During those years there were anywhere from 1 to over 3 weeks less time for the growing season in The Hamptons as compared to the North Fork.

When this data is further examined, it is seen that this difference occurs mostly between the dates of the last spring frost. The average last frost in The Hamptons is usually around April 23rd, while that on the North Fork occurs around the beginning of April. This spring difference is much greater than the difference between the first fall frosts, which usually occur during the end of October to the beginning of November on both forks. This supports the fact that the growing season gets off to a slower start in The Hamptons. The use of heat summation of "Growing Degree Days" is also another standard for determining climatic differences in grape-growing areas. Heat-summation is a standard developed by the University of California at Davis, and it is the measurement of the mean monthly temperatures of a single area, above 500 F. The average number of degree days for the North Fork (at Riverhead) and The Hamptons (at Bridgehampton) are as follows:

- Riverhead (1941-1970) - 2,932
- Bridgehampton (1941-1970) - 2,531

From the period of 1941 through 1970, the average number of heat summation days for the Riverhead Station placed them between the Regions II and III. During the same period, Bridgehampton was placed between the Region I and II. The growing degree days for the periods 1973 to 1979 averaged 2,575 for Bridgehampton and 2,987 for Riverhead. During this time the area of the Riverhead Station on the North Fork varied between Regions II and III while the Bridgehampton area varied between Regions I and II. As far as grape growing areas are concerned, this is a significant difference. In the years 1941-1979, the number of degree days in The Hamptons rarely came close to the number accumulated on the North Fork. This is another distinguishing climate feature which exists between the North Fork and The Hamptons. The Atlantic Ocean is the main reason for The Hamptons and more so, the North Fork's buffered climate patterns. Heading west, as the two forks merge into the main body of Long Island, the effect of the Atlantic Ocean is greatly diminished. This is evident when data from Bridgehampton is compared with data from specific areas west of the proposed viticultural area. At the Brookhaven National Laboratory located in central Long Island and Patchogue located on the Great South Bay on the south shore, specific comparisons can be made. The Brookhaven National Laboratory located less than 15 miles (24 km) west of The Hamptons can have as much as 50 days less of a growing season (growing season averages 150 days 1973-1982) than that recorded at Bridgehampton. Patchoque has as much as 36 days less (growing season averages 176 days 1973-1982)) with most seasons being around 1-2 weeks less than Bridgehampton. The amount of heat summation or growing degree days accumulated in areas to the west of The Hamptons also differs considerably. During the period 1973-1979 the growing degree days averaged 2,403 at the Brookhaven National Laboratory while at Bridgehampton it averaged 2,575 degree days. Over that period the Brookhaven Lab averaged 172 degree days less than Bridgehampton. This significant difference in heat summation correlates with the shorter growing season found at Brookhaven. The main reason why the climate differs west of The Hamptons is due to the lesser effect of the Atlantic Ocean, on buffering temperatures. As the buffering southwest winds approach western Long Island, they first must travel over a small sliver of land known as Long Beach, Jones Beach and Fire Island. The winds then must travel over the inlets of South Oyster Bay, Great South Bay and Moriches Bay, before traveling over the main body of Long Island. The combination of passing over the narrow, colder, island strips and bays causes a slight loss in the warmth of the winds, thereby lessening its effect in buffering the mainland. By the time the winds travel north, a few miles inward, they have lost a great deal of the warmth they had previously carried and hence do significantly less to control temperatures than the breezes traveling over The Hamptons. The Hamptons and the North Fork are much narrower strips of land than the main body of Long Island, and therefore alter the temperatures of the winds to a much lesser degree than western Long Island. The periods 1973-1981 show Patchogue averaging 4.1 °F (−16 °C) cooler than Bridgehampton for the same period. The location of the Western boundary is based on the following evidence: First and foremost, commercial agriculture, and farmland available for grape-growing are quite limited west of the Riverhead area. The "Pine Barrens" are unsuitable for planting. The remaining areas available for agriculture, to the north and south of the "Pine Barrens," may be suitable for grape growing, however the differences in both soil and climate distinguish this area significantly from The Hamptons. Apart from various soil types having different characteristics, the growing season in this area can be considerably shorter than that found in The Hamptons.

The diminished ocean effect in this area, is very inconsistent, allowing for a greater occurrence of late spring and early fall frosts. The consistently shorter growing season, lower amount of heat summation and lower winter minimums, found west of the Town of Riverhead greatly increase the threat of winter injury to the grapes and could force the vintner in this area to carry out cultural practices similar to those used in the colder regions of upstate New York. The Hamptons define an area with unique climatic and geographic conditions, different from the rest of Long Island.

To summarize, it is important that the specific grape growing areas on Long Island be recognized and set apart from one another in order to maintain individuality and also to protect the consumer. The evidence presented in the petition and the notice of proposed rulemaking supports the fact that "The Hamptons, Long Island" region has within its boundaries distinct and unique grape growing conditions which make it a separate American viticultural area. On the basis of the evidence provided by the petitioner, ATF finds "The Hamptons, Long Island" viticultural area to be a delimited grape-growing region distinguishable by geographical features.

The USDA plant hardiness zones are 7a and 7b.

=== Soils ===
The soils which make up The Hamptons are distinctly different from those of the surrounding areas. The difference in soils occurs fairly abruptly, beginning at the Peconic River and continues eastward to Montauk Point. This also designates the northern boundary for "The Hamptons, Long Island" appellation. The predominant soil types which are found on the peninsula land north of The Hamptons, commonly known as the North Fork, are as follows:

1. Carver-Plymouth-Riverhead Association.
  These soils are excessively well-drained and are very sandy. They are located primarily on the perimeter of the North Fork and are usually rolling or sloping in terrain. The natural fertility of these soils is low and the rapid permeability of water through them makes irrigation a desirable option for vineyards in this area.
2. Haven-RiverheadAssociation
  These soils are characteristically deep and somewhat level. They are well-drained and have a medium texture. Most of these soils have a moderate to high water holding capacity and crops respond well to lime and fertilizer when grown in these soils. Due to these factors, this soil association (which is the predominant one of the North Fork) is considered one of the best farming areas in Suffolk County.

The soils of The Hamptons on the other hand are somewhat different and many more soil associations are present:

1. Plymouth-CarverAssociation
  These soils are rolling, hilly, deep and excessively drained. Characteristically, scrub oak and other minor trees are found as cover. Permeability is rapid and natural fertility is low. Most of these soils have never been farmed due to these factors and hence they are known to be poor supporters of crops.
2. Bridgehampton-HavenAssociation.
  These soils are deep and excessively drained and have a medium texture. It is its depth, good drainage and moderate to high available water-holding capacity that make this soil well-suited to farming. Most of these areas are currently under cultivation of potatoes and vegetables. These soils are the main reason why potato and vegetable growers in The Hamptons have consistently used less irrigation water than their North Fork counterparts.
3. Montauk-Montauk, Sandy variant-Bridgehampton Association.
  These soils are deep and usually very sloping. Its steep slopes, irregular topography and a high water table limit the potential of this area for conventional farming, but may be very suitable for supporting grapes. Presently, most of this area is either idle or wooded.
4. Montauk, Sandy Variant-Plymouth Association.
  These soils are excessively drained and coarse textured. Sloping areas within this association also limit conventional farming practices. This loamy-sand is droughty but contains a black surface layer which is high in organic matter content. There is no indication that grapes cannot be grown on these soils.
5. Montauk-Haven-Riverhead Association.
  These soils are fairly well-drained and are located mainly on the northern side of The Hamptons along the Peconic Bay. The surface layer is a silt loam, with a fine sandy loam found at deeper levels. These soils are very deep and well suited to cultivation.
6. Dune-Land-TidalMarsh-Beach Association.
  The remainder of the soils in The Hamptons consist of these types of soils which make up the beach and marshland areas, both of which are unsuitable for farming. As was previously stated, the soils of the North Fork and The Hamptons are quite different. At the Town of Riverhead where the forks meet, there is still some slight separation of the different soil associations. To the west of The Hamptons, the soil associations of Long Island tend to become less restricted to a distinct geographic area and much more intermingling and blending of soil series can be found. Along with this fact, there are the soils making up the "spine" of Long Island, known as the "Pine Barrens." These "Pine Barrens" run east and west down the center of Long Island. The Pine Barrens are an untouched pine stand, one of the last wild areas on Long Island. The soils of the "Pine Barrens" can support only short scrubby pine forests. This is the only vegetation found in the light, extremely sandy and unfertile soils found just west of The Hamptons. This land area is the major ground water recharge basin for Suffolk County. This area is presently being considered by New York State for preservation status, due to its importance for Long Island's water supply.

Further west through Nassau County and into New York City, the soil associations become more foreign to those found on the eastern end of Long Island. Of major importance, it must also be pointed out that while various soil types found to the west of The Hamptons may be similar to those found there, the encroachment of dense suburban and industrial development on Long Island has made commercial agriculture and land available for it almost non-existent in the townships west of the viticultural area. The Hamptons contain a greater percentage of silt and loam than the soil series associations found on the North Fork. This accounts for the fact that The Hamptons soils have a greater water-holding capacity than North Fork soils and hence require less irrigation.
