= Aurore (grape) =

Variety of grape

- Grape (Vitis)
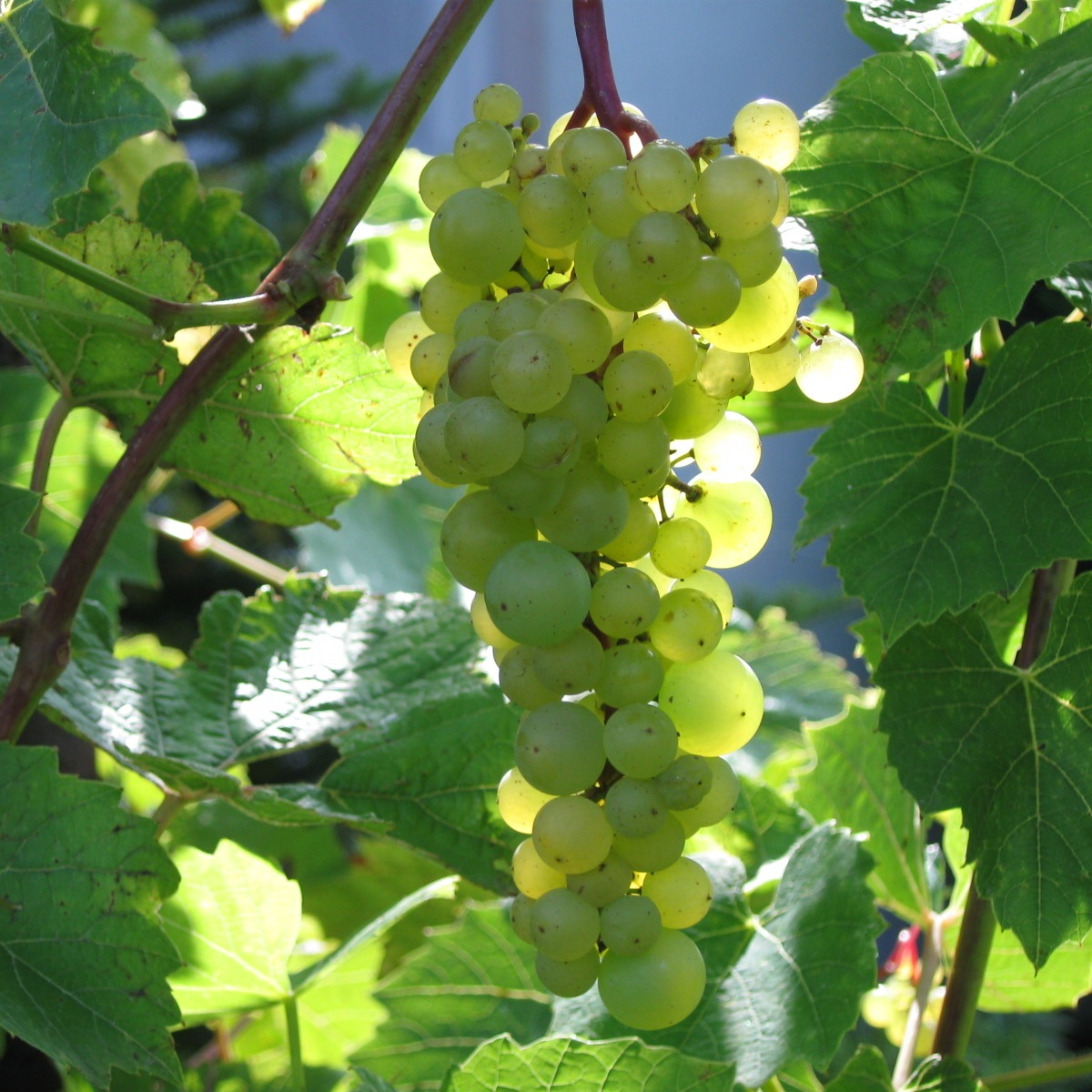
- Aurore grape in Poland
- Color of berry skin: Blanc
- Species: Interspecific crossing
- Also called: Seibel 5279 and other synonyms
- Origin: France, created by Albert Seibel
- Notable regions: Northern United States, Canada, and United Kingdom
- VIVC number: 784

Aurore (also known as Seibel 5279) is a white complex hybrid grape variety produced by French viticulturist Albert Seibel and used for wine production mostly in the United States and Canada. Over a long lifetime, Seibel produced many complex hybrid crosses (known as Seibel grapes) of Vitis vinifera to American grapes. The Aurore grape is a cross of Seibel 788 (which is Sicilien × Clairette Dorée Ganzin) and Seibel 29 (a crossing of Munson and an unidentified Vitis vinifera).

The fruit of Aurore ripens early in the season between late August and early September. Although the vine is resistant of many mildew diseases, is productive and vigorous, the fruit suffers susceptibility from bunch rot and bird attack. Aurore is planted where growing seasons are short like the Northern United States, Canada and the United Kingdom but is also planted in more temperate climates to extend the harvest season.

Aurore may be used as a table or wine grape. It tends not to be used as a table grape due to unsuitability for shipping and is generally used for bulk wine production for blending with wines made Vitis labrusca grape varieties. It is also used to a lesser extent to make fruity and sparkling wines though the wines tend to have neutral flavor and slight "foxy" character typical of many hybrids.

== History ==
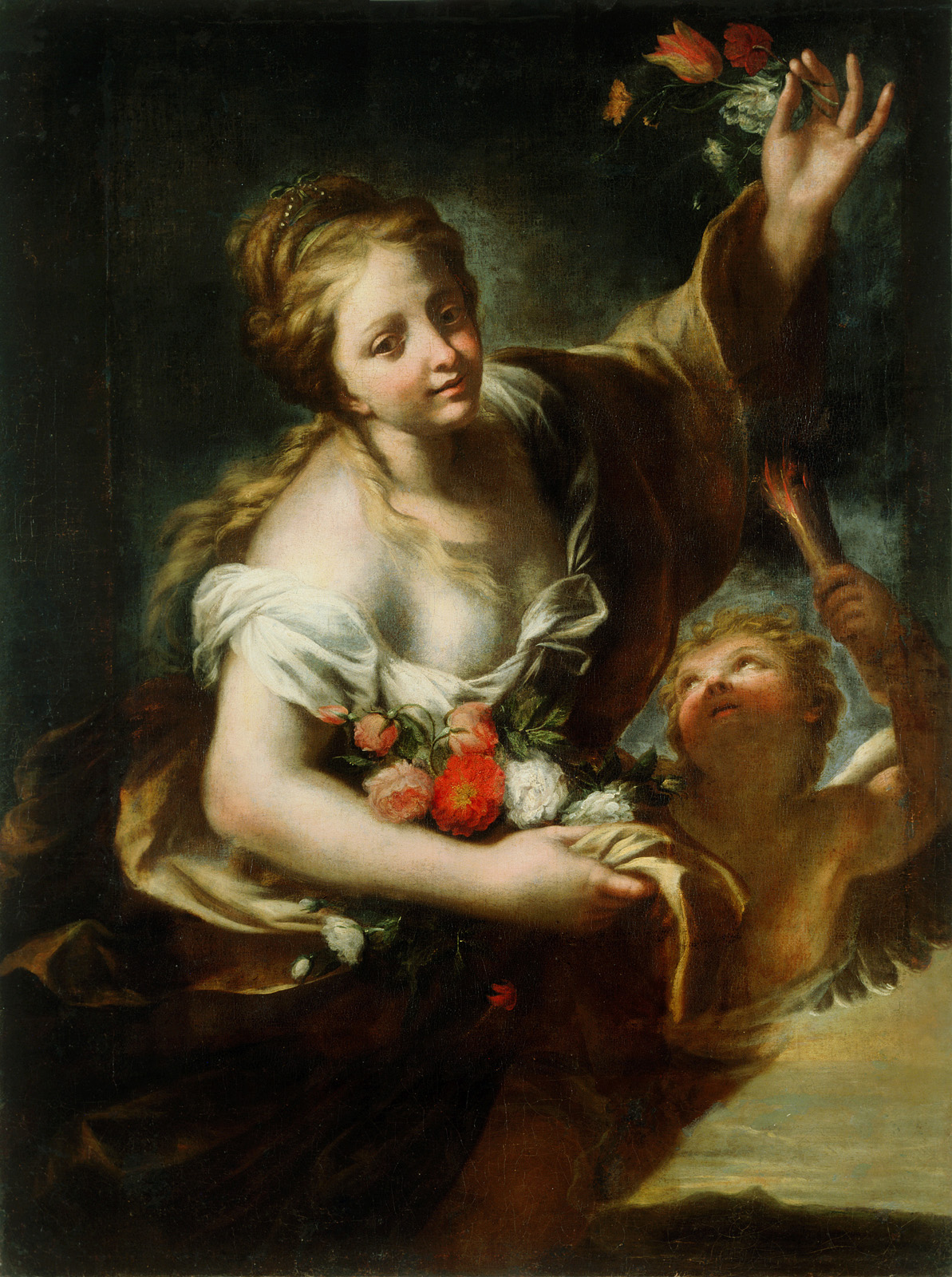
Aurore was named after the Roman goddess Aurora (pictured in painting by Giovanni Andrea Carlone).

Aurore was created by the French viticulturist Albert Seibel, working from grapes varieties grown at his nursery and vineyard in Aubenas, Ardèche in the Rhône Valley. Seibel named the variety after Aurora, the Roman goddess of the dawn who according to legend would announce the arrival of the sun every morning. The name Aurora, itself, is derived from the Latin word for dawn and is today still used as a synonym for Aurore.

The grape was originally bred to be a table grape variety but fell out of favor for table grape growers due to how quickly the freshly picked grapes spoiled and the tendency of berries to fall off the stem in transit.

Aurore was first introduced to the United States, via Ellis Island, in the 1940s and from New York spread throughout the country. Soon it was the most widely planted non-Vitis labrusca grape variety in New York but since the 1970s its numbers have declined as growers began planting more Vitis vinifera and other hybrid varieties.

The first plantings of Aurore in Canada were planted in 1946.

=== Pedigree ===
Aurore is known as a "complex hybrid", meaning that within its lineage are grape varieties from a number of species in the Vitis genus--including Vitis vinifera, Vitis rupestris and Vitis lincecumii. The two parent varieties of Aurore, Seibel 788 & Seibel 29, were also Seibel grapes with complex pedigrees themselves.

Seibel 788 was a crossing of the two hybrid varieties Sicilien and Clairette Dorée Ganzin. Sicilien is a crossing of two Vitis vinifera varieties, Bicane and Pascal blanc, while Clairette Dorée Ganzin was an interspecific crossing produced by French grape breeder Victor Ganzin. The two parents of Clairette Dorée Ganzin were the Vitis vinifera variety Bourboulenc and the hybrid Ganzin 60 (itself a cross of Aramon noir and a Vitis rupestris variety).

Seibel 29 is a crossing of an unknown Vitis vinifera variety and the Munson hybrid grape (also known as Jaeger 70) that was created by the Missouri viticulturist Hermann Jaeger. Munson is a crossing of a Vitis lincecumii and Vitis rupestris vine.

== Viticulture ==
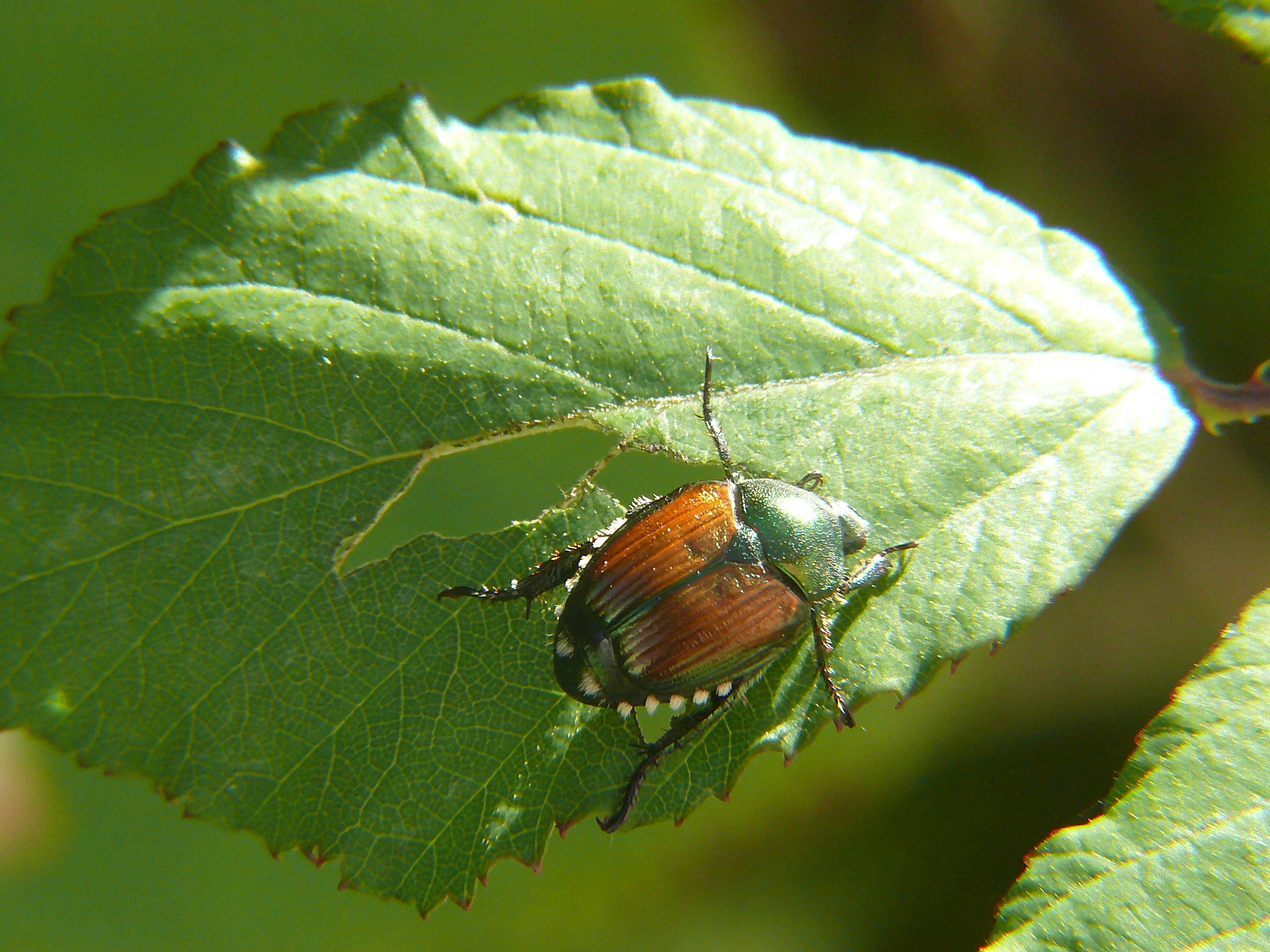
One of the viticultural hazards that can afflict Aurore vines are infestations from Japanese beetles.

While classified as a white grape varieties and only used to produce white wines, clusters of Aurore blanc often will have a pink tinge to them (similar to Pinot gris and Gewürztraminer though not as dark as those two varieties can be). Aurore is known to be a very vigorous and productive vine, capable of producing high yields and expansive foliage if not kept in check with winter pruning and summer leaf-pulling. It is a very early ripening variety, coming to full ripeness even before varieties such as Chasselas in cold climates.

The variety is moderately winter-hardy, able to sustain winter freezes down to −20 °F (−29 °C). While Aurore has good resistance to downy mildew, the variety is very susceptible to the viticultural hazards of Eutypa dieback, powdery mildew, black rot and botrytis bunch rot. The smooth leaves of the vine also makes it susceptible to angular leaf scorch as well as infestation from the invasive Japanese beetle. Growers practicing organic viticulture will often use diatomaceous earth as a dusting spray to help deter the beetle but this method is only effective if the dust comes into direct contact with the beetle and gets easily washed off by rains.

Aurore berries can be very thin skinned and prone to splitting if rainfall happens too close to harvest. Very mature berries also have a tendency of falling off the stem.

== Wine regions ==
While Aurore originated in France and in the early 20th century had around 288 hectares (712 acres) planted in the northeastern reaches of the country and in the southwest, today it is hardly found in France. Outside France it is found in several states in the United States (most notably the cool-climate states of Minnesota, New York, New Hampshire and Nebraska). In 2009, wine producers in New York crushed 3,530 tons of the Aurore for both blended and varietal white wine. In New Hampshire, Jewell Towne Vineyards is noted for producing an Aurore varietal.

Other states in the US with plantings of Aurore include: Connecticut, Indiana, Kansas, Massachusetts, Michigan (in the Leelanau Peninsula AVA), Missouri, New Mexico, Ohio (in the Lake Erie AVA), Pennsylvania, Washington (in the Puget Sound AVA), West Virginia and Wisconsin.

In Canada, Aurore was once widely planted throughout British Columbia but since the 1980s have seen its number of plantings drop drastically along with other hybrid varieties as producers in regions such as the Okanagan Valley transition away from hybrid varieties to international varieties such as Pinot noir and Chardonnay. In Ontario, between 2007 and 2012 around 200 tons of Aurore in total was crushed in the province as the numbers of plantings there also decline. In Québec, producers such as Domaine des Côtes d'Ardoise are still producing varietal examples of Aurore.

== Styles ==
Aurore is used to produce a wide range of both blended and varietal white wine styles at a variety of sweetness levels from dry to off-dry. Some producers also use the grape to make sparkling wine. While the grape does not travel well for commercial table grape production, it can be a favorite eating grape for home gardeners due to its soft, juicy flesh.

According to Master of Wine Jancis Robinson, Aurore tends to produce light-bodied floral wines that are relatively neutral in flavor but often exhibit the characteristic "foxy" note typical of many hybrids. This "foxy" aroma note tends to be more pronounced from examples produced in the eastern United States than in the west. Very ripe examples of Aurore also tend to exhibit more "foxy" flavors.

== Synonyms and confusion with other grapes ==
Over the years Aurore has been known under a variety of synonyms including Aurora, Feri Szőlő, Finánc Szőlő, Redei, S-5279, and Seibel 5279.

Aurore is often confused with a South American table grape known as Aurora that was produced at the Instituto Agronomico de Campinas in Brazil. This confusion stems in part to Aurore's history of being originally bred to be a table grape itself and Aurora being one of the known synonyms for the Seibel wine grape.
