= Cascade (grape) =

Variety of grape

Cascade is a red complex hybrid grape variety that was created by French viticulturist Albert Seibel in the early 20th century in Aubenas, Ardèche, in the Rhône Valley. It has been commercially available in North America since 1938 and has since been planted in Canada and the United States (particularly New York). However, in warmer climates, the grape is highly susceptible to a number of grapevine viruses, which has discouraged plantings of the variety.

== History and pedigree ==
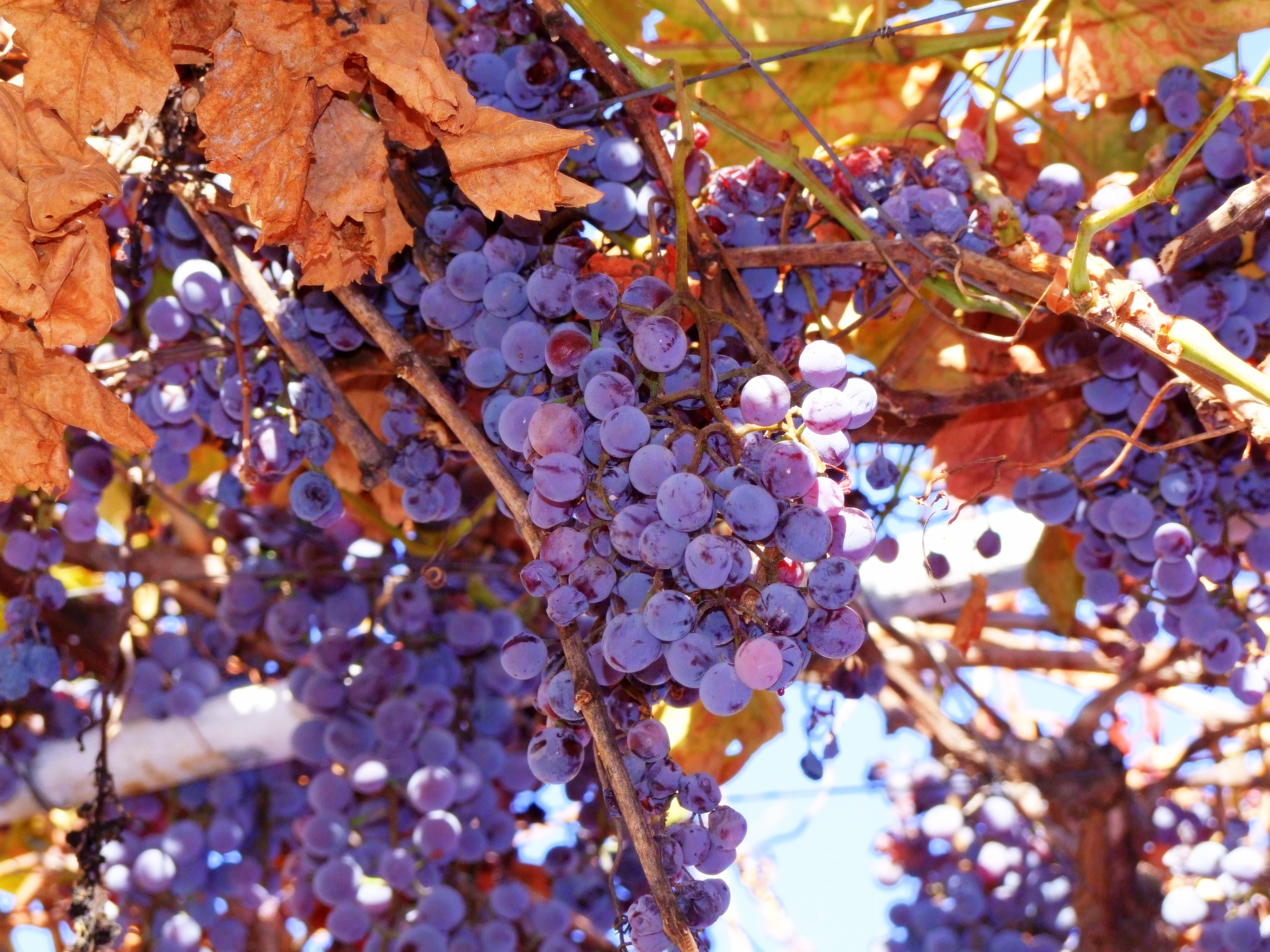
The Vitis labrusca grape variety Concord (pictured) is one of the grape varieties that make up Cascade's complex pedigree.

Cascade is a Seibel grape, being produced from a crossing of Seibel 7042 and Gloire de Seibel by the French viticulturist Albert Seibel in the early 1930s. The variety was first released for commercial production in 1938. Known originally as Seibel 13053, the grape was given the name "Cascade" by the Finger Lakes Wine Growers Association in 1970. The exact reasoning behind the name is unclear, with some winegrowers speculating that the name came from the way that the highly productive vine would have fruit "cascading off the vine" like a waterfall even from water sprouts and suckers.

Cascade is considered an interspecific "complex hybrid", meaning that within its pedigree are grape varieties from several species of the Vitis genus. Taken together the pedigree of Cascade includes varieties from the Vitis vinifera, Vitis labrusca, Vitis rupestris, Vitis rotundifolia and Vitis lincecumii species.

Seibel 7042 is a crossing of Seibel 5351 and Seibel 6268. Gloire de Seibel is a cross of Seibel 867 and Seibel 452. From these parent and grandparent varieties, Cascade is descended from Concord, Chasselas Musqué and the Vitis vinifera teinturier grape Alicante Bouschet (great-grandparents to Seibel 5351). Cascade also has extended relations with another vinifera teinturier Alicante Ganzin (grandparent to Seibel 452) and the Munson grape (great-grandparent to Seibel 452). The phylloxera-resistance rootstock variety Rupestris du Lot is also related to Cascade as a grandparent variety to Seibel 452.

=== Relationship to other grapes ===
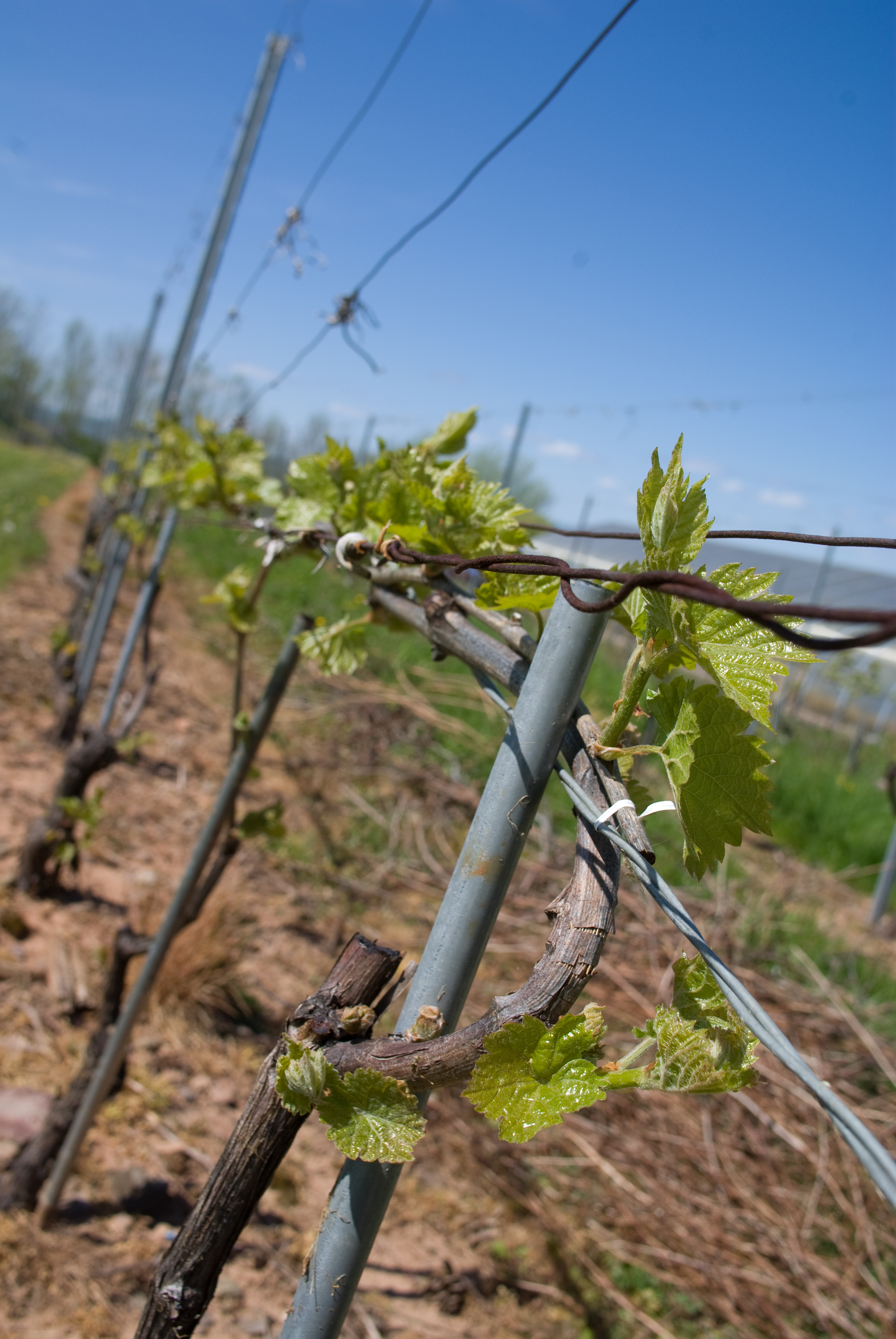
Cascade was crossed with Seyve-Villard to produce L'Acadie blanc (vine pictured)

In Canada, Cascade was crossed with the white Villard grape Seyve-Villard at the University of Guelph Horticultural Research Institute of Ontario to produce the white wine grape L'Acadie blanc.

== Viticulture ==
Cascade is a very early ripening variety that can be very productive and high yielding. The color of the grape berry skins can have a bright blue hue. It is a moderately winter hardy vine able to withstand winter temperature down to −10 °F (−23 °C). The grape carries strawberry notes and aromas. It bears heavily (over 50 lbs per vine is common) and in the opinion of some growers "can't be overcropped" (meaning it does not lose its varietal character with higher yields as other varieties such as Pinot Noir do).

However, while its loose-berry clusters tend to have good resistance to fungal infections (such as downy and powdery mildew), in some climates the vine is highly prone to a number of soil-borne viral grapevine disease such as tomato ringspot virus which creates yellow veins in the leaves, stunts the growth of shoots and causes fruit clusters not to set properly.

== Wine regions ==
In 1975 there were 183 acres (74 hectares) of Cascade planted in New York state but the relatively poor quality of wine produced from the grape and its susceptibility to grapevine disease has caused many producers to uproot those plantings. Today there are some plantings of Cascade in Virginia where the variety is usually ready for harvest by mid-August. Cascade may be a useful grape in the Pacific Northwest region of the U.S.

== Styles ==
According to Master of Wine Jancis Robinson, Cascade tends to produce light bodied wines that are very low in acid. While it is rarely made as a varietal, though it can be used in rosé production, it is often blended with other hybrid grape varieties such as Maréchal Foch and Baco noir, contributing to the perfume aroma of the wine.

== Synonyms ==
As a relatively recently created hybrid variety, Cascade is not known under many synonyms with only S 13053 and Seibel 13053 being recognized by the Vitis International Variety Catalogue (VIVC).
