= Villard grapes =

Variety of grape

Villard grapes are French wine hybrid grape created by French horticulturist Bertille Seyve and his father-in-law Victor Villard (father and grandfather, respectively, of grape breeder Joannes Seyve). They include the dark-skinned Villard noir and the white-wine variety Villard blanc with both being members of the Seyve-Villard grape family. Villard noir is a cross of two other French hybrids, Siebel 6905 (also known as Le Subereux) and Seibel 7053 (also known as Chancellor) created by physician and viticulturist Albert Seibel. Like Villard noir, Villard blanc was produced as a crossing of two Seibel grapes, in this case, Le Subereux and Seibel 6468.

Villard noir was once widely grown in the South West France wine region with some plantings also found in Bordeaux. The variety reaches its peaked in the late 1960s when there was more than 74,000 acres (30,000 hectares) of Villard noir planted throughout France. (And an additional 21,000 hectares of its white skin sibling, Villard blanc). By 1968, Villard noir was the fifth most widely planted black-skin grape in France and Villard blanc the third most widely planted white-skin variety. However, from that peak its numbers soon declined as French authorities attributed the proliferation of hybrid varieties as a cause of the growing wine lake problem, essentially perceived surplus of wine supplies, in France and ordered the uprooting of many varieties. Since 1977 Appellation d'Origine Contrôlée (AOC) laws have forbidden the planting of the Villard grapes in France.

Despite being a hybrid grape variety, plantings of Villard noir are normally grafted onto Vitis berlandieri rootstock. Although susceptible to botrytis and powdery mildew, the vine is virtually immune to downy mildew and can be found in American wine regions on the east coast where mildew is often a problem. Today, is commonly used as a blending grape for table wine or in the production of distilled beverages.

== History ==
In the early 20th century, Bertille Seyve and his father-in-law Victor Villard picked up on the work of French physician and viticulturalist Albert Seibel and began experimenting with Seibel grape in the creation of new varieties. Working with these grapes, Seyve and Villard created the popular Seyval blanc variety, which became an important grape in the wine industry of the United Kingdom, and the two Villard varieties, which became popular in France. A few reasons for the Villards’ popularity were the varieties’ relative ease of cultivation, their resistance to downy mildew, and prolific yields.

Plantings of the varieties increased for the devastation of the war years following World War I and World War II with the Villards hitting their peak in the French wine industry during the 1960s. By 1968, Villard noir was the fifth most widely black skin grape variety (behind such notable Vitis vinifera varieties such as Cabernet Sauvignon and Merlot) while Villard blanc was the third most planted white grape variety (behind Ugni blanc and Chardonnay). During these peak years there were more than 30,000 and 21,000 hectares of Villard noir and blanc, respectively, planted over a swatch of southern France that stretched from Bordeaux all the way to the northern Rhone.

But this peak period was short lived as hybrid grape varieties became a source for scorn and blame from French authorities and growers of exclusively vinifera fruit for the wine lake phenomenon that troubled the European wine industry for much of the 20th century. For the rest of the century, both Villard varieties as well as several other hybrid grapes (like Baco noir, Chambourcin, Couderc and Plantet) were targeted by aggressive vine-pull schemes where growers were paid substantial amounts to uproot their vineyards and either replant with more "noble grapes" or different agriculture crops. These efforts were highly successful and by the end of the 1980s, the numbers for Villard noir had dropped to 2,500 hectares and for Villard blanc to 4,600 hectares. Further fueled by changes to French wine laws in the 1970s that prohibited the use of hybrid grapes in AOC wines and banned future plantings, both grapes were virtually eradicated from French vineyards by the turn of the 21st century.

== Wine regions ==
While the Villard grapes were once widely planted throughout southern France, particularly in the wine regions of the southwest, and could be found in Bordeaux as well the vineyards of the northern Rhône Valley, today it is virtually eradicated from France. The few exceptions are isolated old vine plantings in the departments of Ardèche and Tarn which survived the vine-pulling period of the late 20th century.

Today, both Villard grapes can be found in limited plantings in various American wines regions including Missouri, Illinois, New Jersey, New Mexico, Virginia, Indiana, Pennsylvania and Oklahoma. In New York State, Villard noir has a long history in the Finger Lakes AVA.

== Viticulture and winemaking ==
The Villard grapes are known for their prolific yields, relative ease of cultivation and resistance to downy mildew. From a winemaking perspective, Villard blanc has the potential to make the better wine but its must can be difficult to work with and can be prone to various wine faults.

== Synonyms ==
Over the years, Villard noir and its wines have been known under a variety of synonyms, including Seyve-Villard 18-315, Seyve-Villard 18315, SV 18-315 and Willard Noir.

Villard blanc has been known under the synonyms Seyve-Villard 12-375 and SV 12-375.
