= Plantet =

Variety of grape

Plantet is a red wine grape variety that was one of the hybrid grape created by French physician and grape breeder Albert Seibel. While the exact parentage of the grape is unknown, the most popular theories has it as a cross of two Seibel grapes, Seibel 867 x Seibel 2524 with another theory speculating that Plantet's parentage was Seibel 4461 crossed with Berlandieri-Jacquez.

Plantet is grown primarily in the Loire Valley around Anjou and is known for its prolific yields. The variety is generally reliable and disease resistant, producing well even after suffering through a spring frost, however the berries tend to be difficult to crush which, along with the uprooting of hybrid varieties throughout France, has contributed to the variety's decline in the latter half of the 20th century.

== History ==
Developed by grape breeder Albert Seibel in the late 19th century, Plantet's exact parentage in unknown though it very likely has at least one Seibel grape as a parent. For most of the 20th century, the variety was the most widely planted hybrid in the Loire Valley. Throughout France, the variety hit its peak in 1968 with more than 64,000 acres (26,000 hectares), almost exclusive to the Loire Valley and other scattered northern French wine regions.

However, the later half of the 20th century saw Plantet caught up in the same disfavor that befell all hybrid grapes in France (most notably Villard noir, Baco noir and others). Aggressive vine pull schemes that included lucrative payments to growers for uprooting their vineyards and prohibition of using hybrid grapes in Appellation d'Origine Contrôlée (AOC) wines contributed to a sharp decline for the grape variety. By the end of the 1980s there was less than 1,000 hectares of the grape throughout France.

== Viticulture ==
Plantet was likely bred by Seibel to be a winter-hardy variety and to some extent it is. Growers in the Loire and many northern French wine regions found that the grape still produced high yields despite severe winters and late spring frost when many other varieties, particularly those of Vitis vinifera would be severely damaged. But there is limit to this benefit with the cold making the berries more difficult to crush and the variety not performing well in regions such as New York State after their harsh winters.

== Synonyms ==
According to the Vitis International Variety Catalogue, the only known synonym for Plantet is original catalog name, Seibel 5455.
