= Flot rouge =

Variety of grape

Flot rouge is a red hybrid grape that is a crossing of Munson (also known as Jaeger 70) and the Languedoc-Roussillon wine grape Aramon noir. The grape was created by French viticulturalist Albert Seibel and was crossed with the Seibel grape 405 to create Seibel 6150 which was one of the parent varieties for Colobel which is still grown in New York.

== Synonyms ==
Over the years, Flot rouge has been known under a variety of synonyms including: Roi des Hybrides and Seibel 1020.
