= Aramon (grape) =

Variety of grape

- Grape (Vitis)
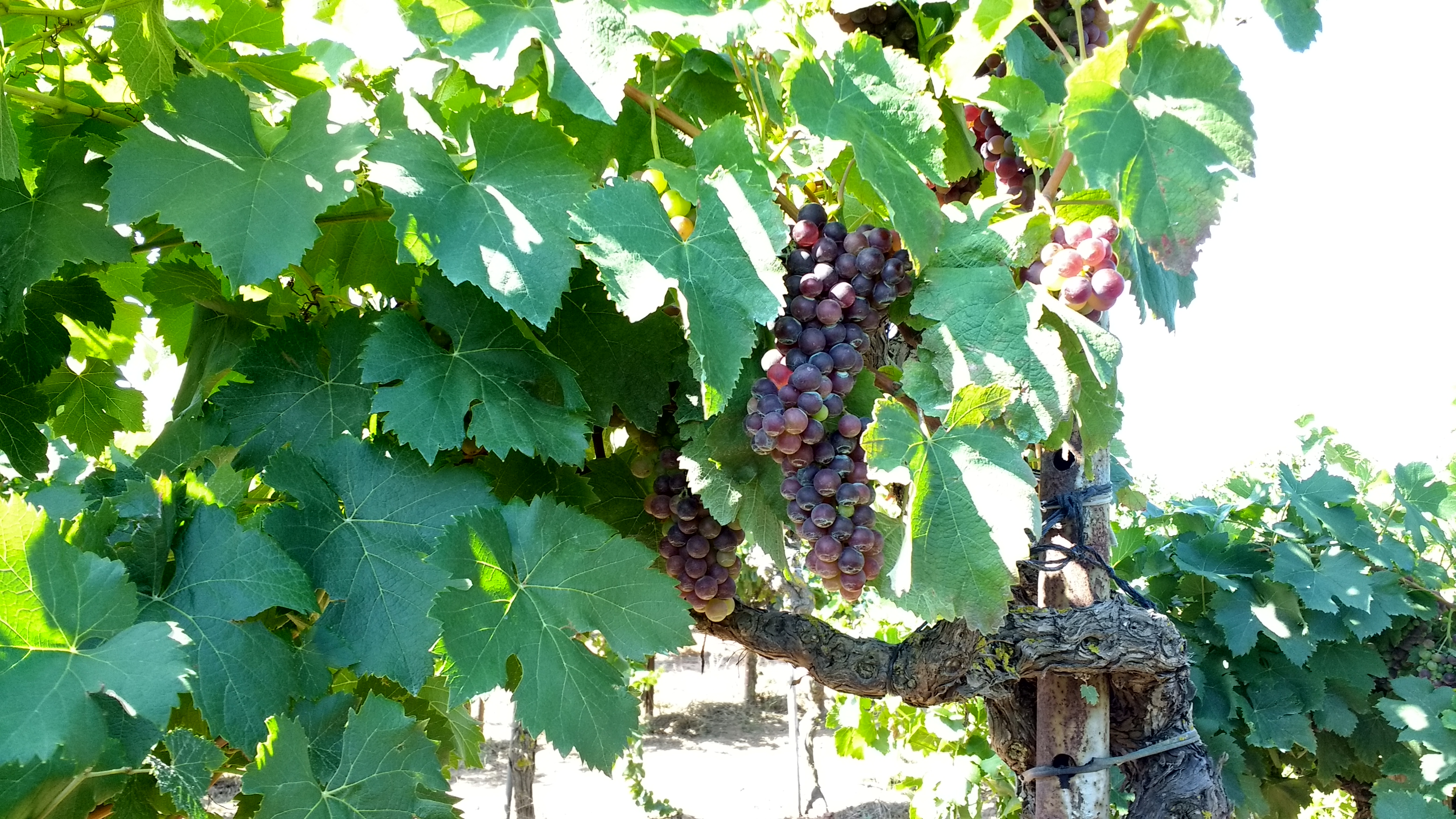
- Old grape in Bessan, southern France
- Color of berry skin: Noir
- Species: Vitis vinifera
- Also called: Aramon noir, Burchardt's Prince, Burkhardt, Pisse-Vin, Ugni noir
- Origin: Spain or southern France?
- Notable regions: Languedoc-Roussillon
- Hazards: Sensitive to spring frost
- VIVC number: 544

Aramon (French pronunciation: [aʁamɔ̃]) or Aramon noir ([-nwaʁ]) is a variety of red wine grape grown primarily in Languedoc-Roussillon in southern France. Between the late 19th century and the 1960s, it was France's most grown grape variety, but plantings of Aramon have been in continuous decline since the mid-20th century. Aramon has also been grown in Algeria, Argentina and Chile but nowhere else did it ever reach the popularity it used to have in the south of France.

It is most noted for its very high productivity, and yields can reach levels as high as 400 hectolitres per hectare. The vine's resistance to oidium, phylloxera, and powdery mildew led to its reputation as workhorse grape that could be relied on by growers for dependable financial returns. However, when cropped at high yields, the resultant wines are very light red in color (but show a blue-black tinge), low in alcohol and extract and generally thin on character. Such Aramon wine is often blended with wine from grapes of darker color such as Alicante Bouschet and Grand Noir de la Calmette to darken the resulting wine.

If planted on poor soils and pruned very severely to much smaller yields, it has been shown to be able to give concentrated wines with spicy, earthy, herbaceous, and somewhat rustic character. However, such Aramon wines are extremely rare, but some varietal wine is still produced in Languedoc.

A viticultural drawback of Aramon is that it buds early and ripens late, which means that it only is suitable for growing in hotter regions, and that it is very sensitive to spring frost.

== History ==
When the south of France - Le Midi - was connected by railways to the more industrial and populous north of the country in the 19th century, the cost of transporting wines and other goods decreased considerably. Previously, waterways had provided the best transportation routes for wine, and only more expensive wines had been able to bear the cost of long overland transport. In the resulting 19th century vineyard expansion of southern France, Aramon became the grape variety of choice in Languedoc. As an indication of the wine industry boom of the era, the vineyards of the Hérault department (one part of Languedoc) more than doubled between 1849 and 1869, when they covered a massive 214,000 hectares (530,000 acres). Thus, in this department alone, a vineyard surface somewhat larger than that of the entire Bordeaux region of today was added in 20 years, most of it planted with Aramon.

The wine produced was undistinguished, but it was produced cheaply and in huge quantities. The simple reds of Languedoc initially competed with equally simple reds made closer to Paris, in areas where most of the wine production disappeared in the early 20th century due to the combined effect of competition and phylloxera. Thus, the wines were not made in a mold that wine consumers of the late 20th and early 21st century would have recognised as a typical "warm climate" style, but rather outmatched other thin red wines by means of sheer volume and lower production costs. Such wines were primarily drunk as everyday table wine by French workers, and they were known as petit rouge – small reds.

Since high-yielding Aramon gives one of the least coloured wines that still pass as red, the practice of blending such wines with wines from teinturier grapes such as Alicante Bouschet was a measure used to give them a measure of increased credibility as reds.

Later, Aramon-based light red wines got competition on the French market from cheap red wines from North Africa, primarily from the then-French colony of Algeria. Algerian wines, produced primarily from Carignan, had more colour, alcohol and concentration than the typical Languedoc wines of the era. Since these characteristics were attractive to consumers, it became common in the 20th century to blend cheap wines from the south of France with Algerian and other North African wines.

These characters lead to a decreased popularity of Aramon in France from the mid-20th century. This trend was reinforced when the French vineyards were hit by frost in 1956 and 1963, which hit the frost-sensitive Aramon particularly hard. Aramon was primarily replaced with Carignan, which overtook Aramon as France's most grown grape variety in the 1960s.

In 2000, there remained 9,100 hectares (22,000 acres) of Aramon in France, primarily in the Hérault, with a rapidly decreasing trend.

== Origin and offspring ==
Despite its similarities to the hybrids Villard noir and Couderc, Aramon is not a hybrid but rather a Vitis vinifera. Some have proposed that Aramon originated in Spain, but DNA typing has revealed Gouais blanc to be one of its parents, with the other parent so far unidentified. This parentage is more typical of French or Germanic varieties, but given its heat-demanding viticultural characteristics, it is unlikely to have survived in cultivation in a colder region. Therefore, its origin could very well be southern France.

Aramon was used extensively by the early French hybridizers in crosses with American grape species like Vitis rupestris and Vitis aestivalis as a source of good viticultural characteristics, and proved a better parent than many of the better known V. vinifera cultivars. Viticulturalist Albert Seibel crossed Aramon with the American hybrid grape Munson to produce Flot rouge.

Aramon was also a parent of the ill-fated AxR1 rootstock, which is "Aramon x Rupestris Ganzin No. 1". AxR1 caused much problems in the Californian wine industry.

== Synonyms ==
Synonyms for Aramon include Aramon Chernyi, Aramon Negro, Aramon noir, Aramon Pignat, Aramon Pigne, Aramon Rozovyi, Aramon Saint Joseph, Aramone, Aramonen, Aramont, Arramont, Burchardt's Prince, Burckarti Prinz, Burkhardt, Eramoul, Eromoul, Gros Bouteillan, Kek Aramon, Pisse-Vin, Plant Riche, Rabalairé, Ramonen, Reballairé, Reballayre, Revalaire, Revellaire, Ugni Neru, Ugni Nevu, Ugni noir, Uni Negre, Uni Noir.

Despite sharing several synonyms with Bouteillan noir, Aramon has no known relationship with the Provençal wine grape.

== Aramon blanc and Aramon gris ==
The lighter-colored mutations Aramon blanc and Aramon gris also exist, and small plantations can still be found in the Hérault.

Synonyms for Aramon blanc include Aramon Panche, Brom, Langedokskii Belyi, Eramoul, Feher Aramon, Game Provansalskii, Langedokskii Belyi, Ochsenauge Weiss, Weißer Ochsenauge.

Aramon gris is known under the synonym Szürke Aramon.
