= Kudirka =

- Lithuanian surname
- m.: Kudirka
- f.: (unmarried): Kudirkaitė
- f.: (married): Kudirkienė

Kudirka is the masculine form of a Lithuanian family name. Its feminine forms are: Kudirkienė (married woman or widow) and Kudirkaitė (unmarried woman). The Dictionary of Lithuanian surnames says that the surname is of uncertain origin, probably related to the French surname Couderc.

Notable people with the surname include:

- Juozas Kudirka (1939–2007), Lithuanian ethnologist, habilitated doctor of sciences in humanities
- Simas Kudirka (1930–2023), seaman known for defecting from the USSR by jumping to the USCGC Vigilant, and who was portrayed in the TV movie The Defection of Simas Kudirka
- Tom Kudirka, founder of 2015, American video game developer
- Vincas Kudirka (1858–1899), poet and doctor, author of the Lithuanian national anthem

== See also ==
- Kudirkos Naumiestis
- 319009 Kudirka, minor planet
