= Vitis 'Ornamental Grape' =

Nonfruiting ornamental plant

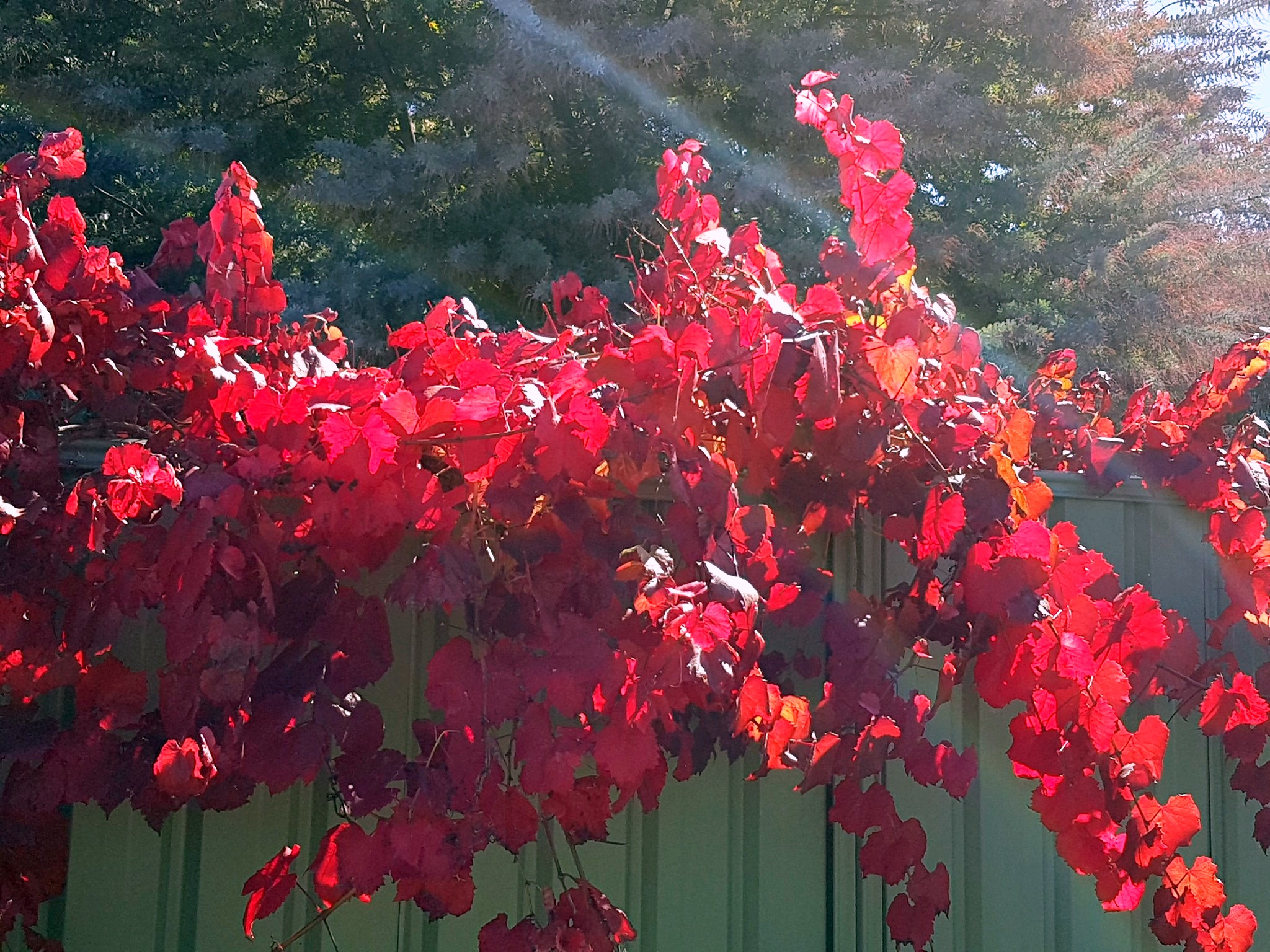
- Fall colours
- Genus: Vitis
- Hybrid parentage: Vitis vinifera × Vitis rupestris
- Origin: France

Vitis 'Ornamental Grape', also known as ornamental grapevine, Ganzin glory, glory vine and crimson glory, is a nonfruiting ornamental plant that is a hybrid of Vitis vinifera (Aramon noir) and Vitis rupestris (Alicante Ganzin).

== Origins ==
The vine was bred in 1879 by Victor Ganzin (1838-1900) in Le Pradet near Toulon in France, who had anticipated to mix the fruit characteristics of V. vinifera with the resistance of V. rupestris to root damage by phylloxera. It was collected at the CSIRO at Merbein, where it was imported from the Viticultural Research Station at Nuriootpa, South Australia in 1963 and was called 'Tinto' (syn. 'Teinturier Male').

== Description ==
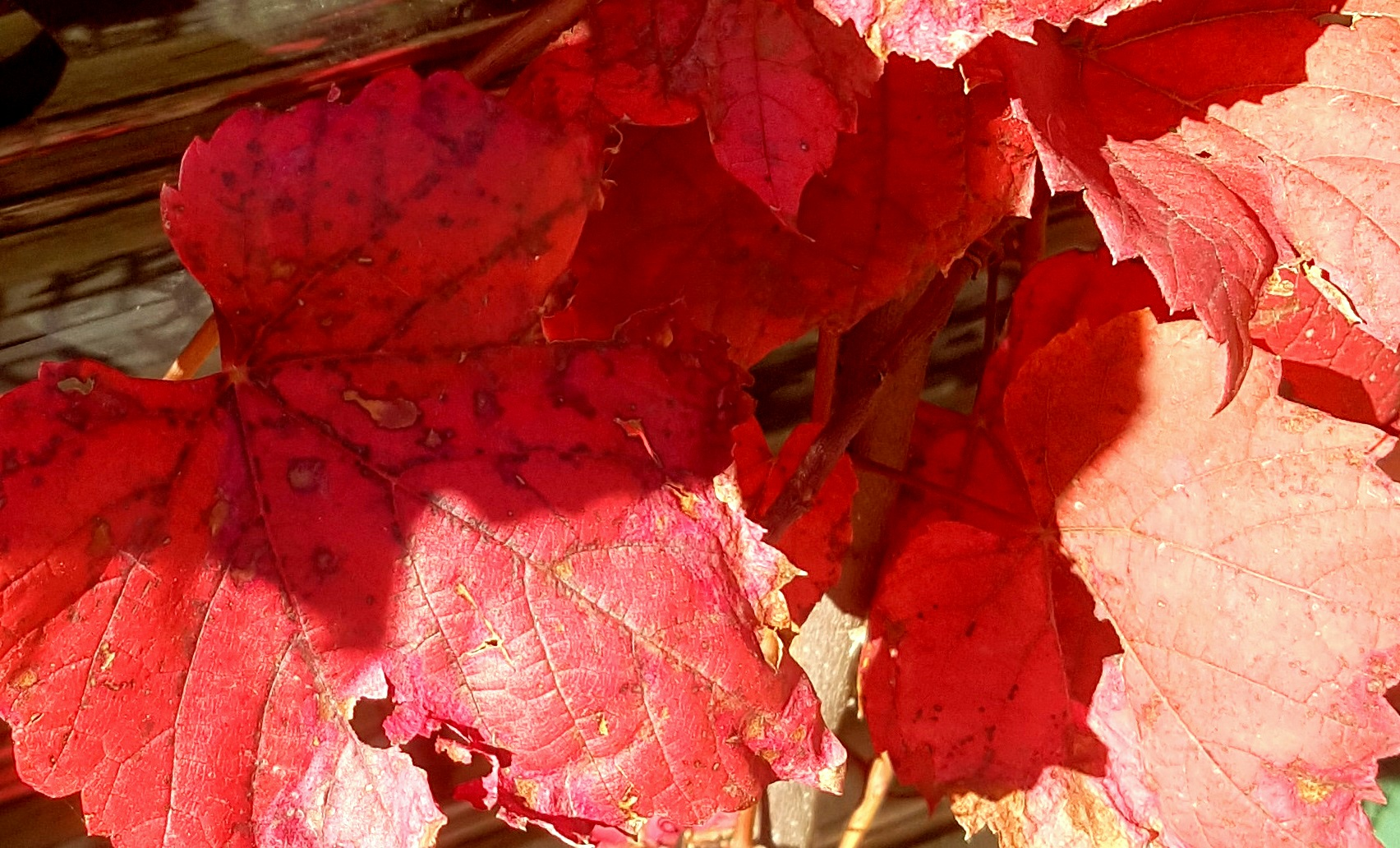
Deep red autumn leaves

The ornamental grape is hardy and generally nonfruiting, vigorously growing, deciduous vine with glossy leaves that have a coppery colour when young which mature to greyish green, turning to amber and orange in early autumn, and then become a brilliant scarlet or crimson by mid-autumn. The leaves tend to be entire to moderately three-lobed, having a thin V-shaped petiolar sinus. The leaves and shoots are representative of hybrids between V. vinifera and V. rupestris.

It grows to a height of 32 metres and reaches a width of 3 metres and, like the other Vitis species, it climbs by using twining tendrils.

=== Inflorescence and fruit ===
The vine produces numerous inflorescences of male flowers with plenteous pollen and a strong fragrance. The inflorescences would then abscess, but occasionally a few flowers produce functional ovaries and at times develop some very small blackish fruit if the climate allows it to, though they don't normally last on the plant and they tend to taste bitter, although birds consume them.

== Cultivation ==
In Australia, the vine is grown for its impressive leaves that turn brilliant red, scarlet, purple and as well as orange in autumn. Easily grown from cuttings, it thrives in a range of climates from hot and dry, to cool moist and subtropical, but would colour best in cooler climates under a sunny spot. It is grown widely in South Australia and has been popular in the state since the early 20th century. It is also present in Mildura and is cultivated elsewhere in Victoria and New South Wales, where it is usually grown over a pergola or fence. The leaves are edible and are used to make dolmades.

It is oftentimes called 'Ornamental Grape', but is sold by nurseries under a number of different names, such as 'Crimson Glory', 'Glory Vine', 'Alicante Bouschet', 'Teinturier' or 'Teinturier Male'. It can get fungal leaf diseases in humid coastal climates.

== Gallery ==
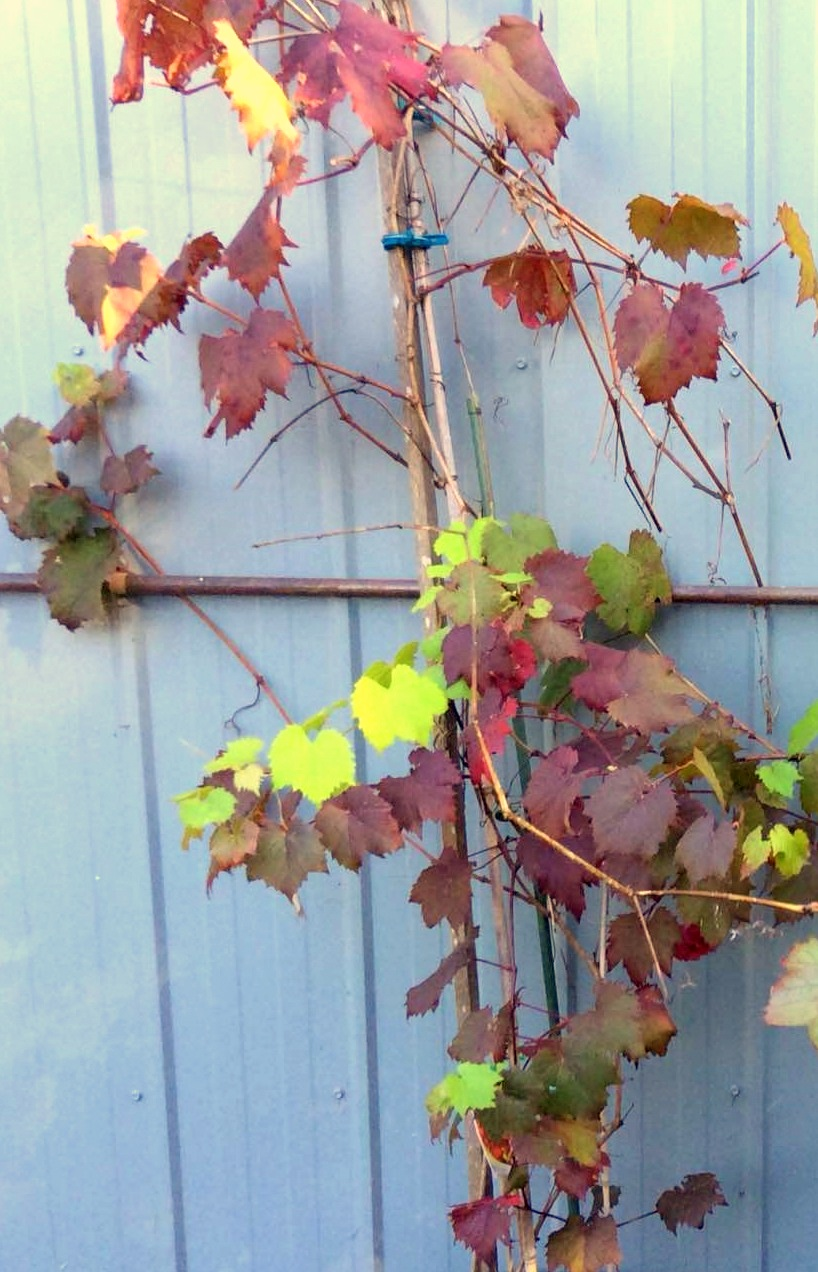
Leaves changing colour with season

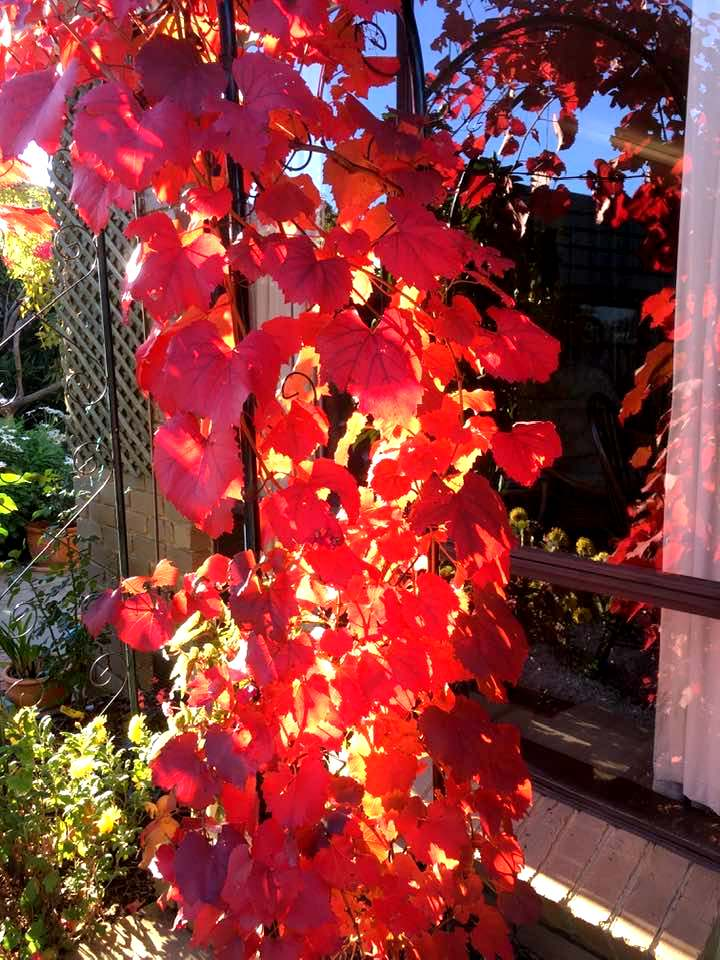
Trailing on trellis

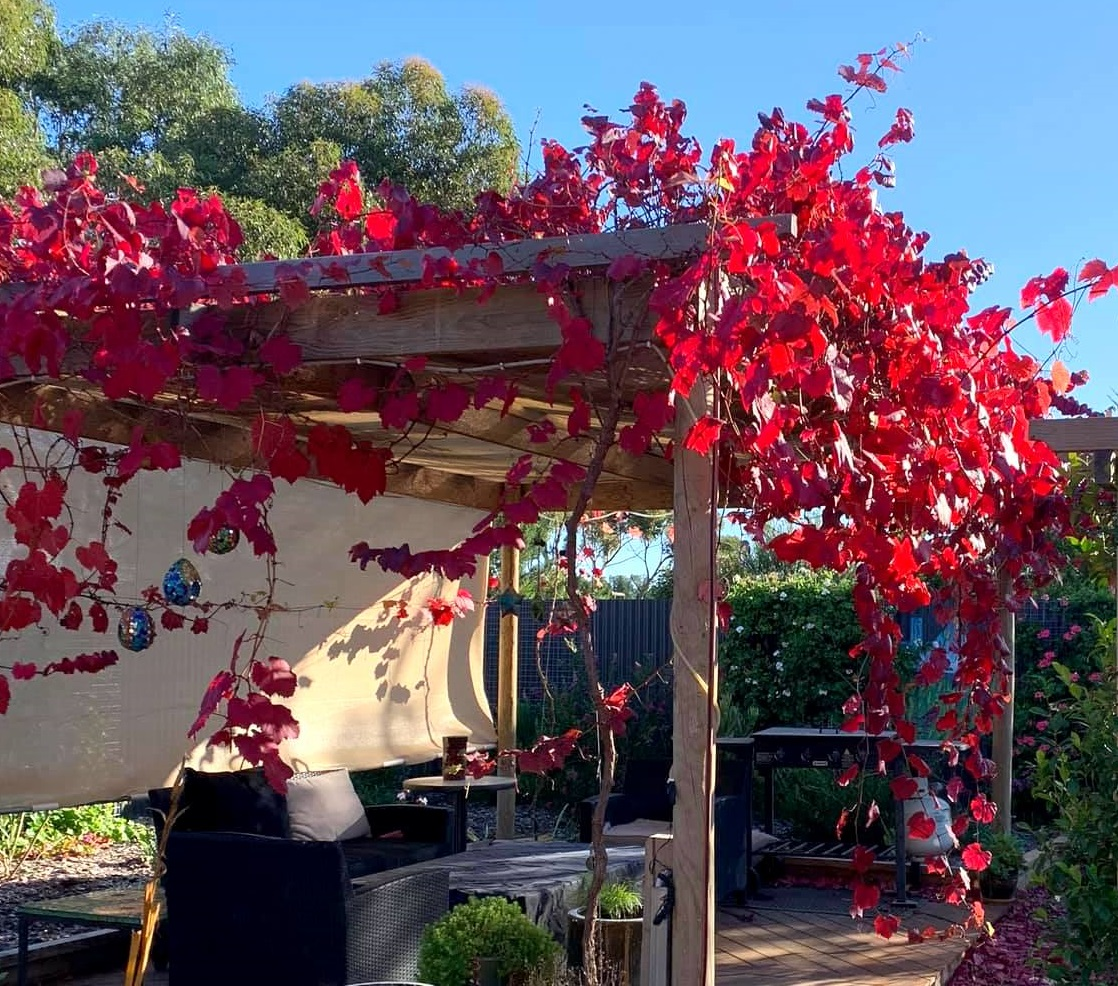
Growing on pergola

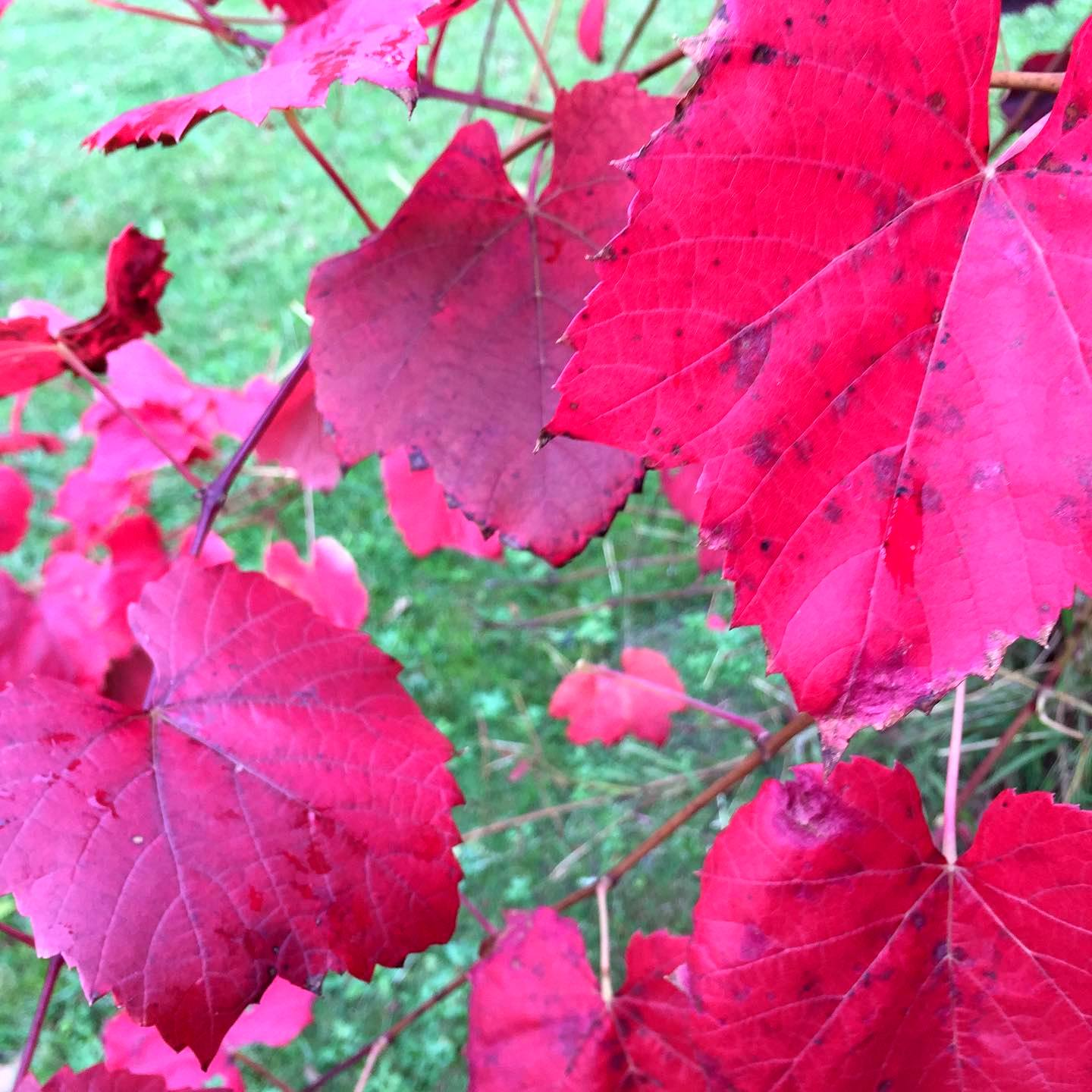
Purplish red fall foliage

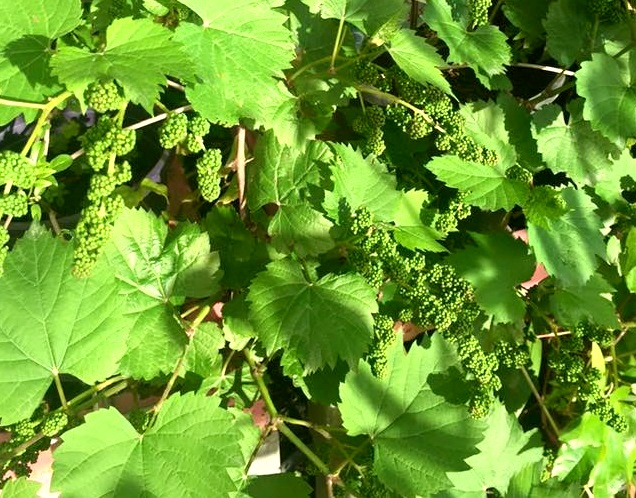
Green leaves with emerging inflorescence

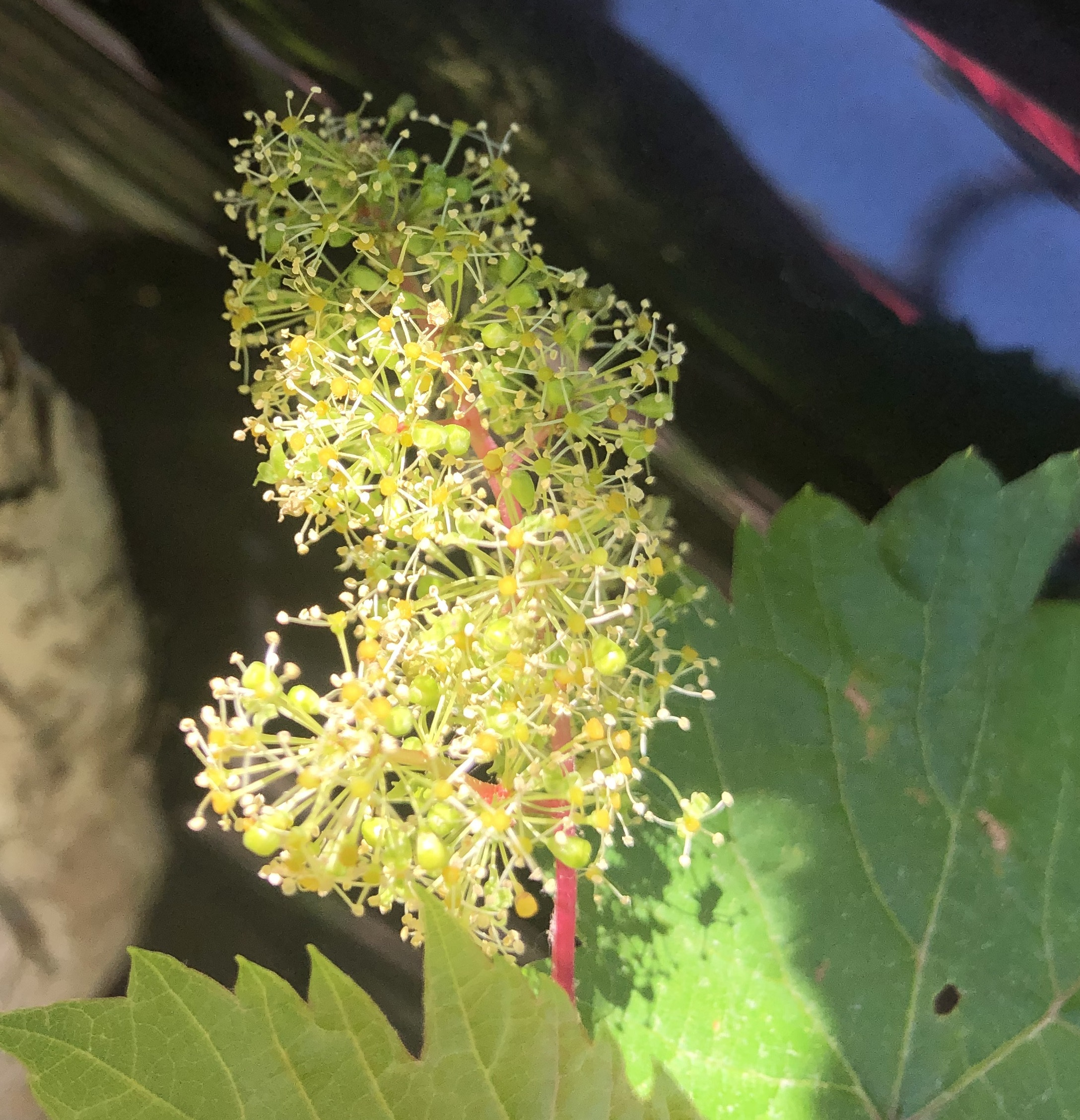
Close view of the sweet-scented inflorescence

== See also ==
- Vitis coignetiae, an ornamental grapevine that produces fruit and is also known as 'crimson glory'
