= Seibel grapes =

Variety of grape

Seibel grapes are a group of wine grape varieties which originated with the work of French viticulturist Albert Seibel crossing European wine grape with American grape species to increase disease resistance. They were planted widely in France during the 1950s but have seen decline in recent years because French wine law prohibits hybrid grapes in appellation wine. The grapes are still commonly used as blending grapes in table wine and mass commercial wines. New Zealand, England, and Canada also have plantings of Seibel grapes.

Almost all of Albert Seibel's hybrid grapes were descended from only four parent grapes: two European grapes (Vitis vinifera), Aramon and Alicante Bouschet; one wild American grape, Jaeger 70 (Vitis rupestris x Vitis lincecumii); and one rootstock, AxR1, which was created by crossing Aramon with a wild American V. rupestris. Although Seibel bred tens of thousands of grapes, he did so almost entirely by crossing and re-crossing his original varieties, all of which were descended from the original four vines, so the basic gene pool of his collection remained largely unchanged.

Almost all later grapevine hybridizers, such as Bertille Seyve and his father-in-law Victor Villard, would simply breed one or two of Albert Seibel's grapes together and name their creations after themselves, such as Seyve-Villard 5276 ("Seyval Blanc").

== List of some Seibel grapes and their common names ==
- Seibel 1 (a Munson and unknown Vitis vinifera crossing)
- Seibel 29 (a Munson and unknown Vitis vinifera crossing)
- Seibel 30
- Seibel 99
- Seibel 405
- Seibel 452 (a crossing of Alicante Ganzin and Seibel 1)
- Seibel 788 (a Sicilien and Clairette Dorée Ganzin) crossing)
- Seibel 793
- Seibel 867 (a crossing of Noah and Vivarais)
- Seibel 880
- Seibel 1000 Rosette
- Seibel 1020 Flot rouge
- Seibel 2003 Vivarais
- Seibel 2007 Aramon du Gard
- Seibel 2510 Cinsaut Seibel
- Seibel 2524
- Seibel 2653 Flot d'Or
- Seibel 2679 (a crossing of Triumph and Alicante Terras 20)
- Seibel 2859 Le Bienvenu
- Seibel 3015 (a crossing of Bayard x Afus Ali (de))
- Seibel 4199
- Seibel 4461
- Seibel 4595
- Seibel 4643 Roi des Noirs
- Seibel 4646 Le Pourpre
- Seibel 4986 Rayon d'Or (a crossing of Aramon du Gard and Seibel 405)
- Seibel 5001 Florental (a crossing of Seibel 2510 and Seibel 867)
- Seibel 5163
- Seibel 5279 Aurore (a crossing of Seibel 788 & Seibel 29)
- Seibel 5351 (a crossing of Seibel 880 and Seibel 2679)
- Seibel 5409 Gloire de Seibel (a crossing of Seibel 867 and Seibel 452)
- Seibel 5410
- Seibel 5455 Plantet
- Seibel 5474 (a crossing of Seibel 405 and Seibel 867)
- Seibel 5487 Le Redessan
- Seibel 5575 Le Rubis
- Seibel 5656 (a crossing of Seibel 4595 and Seibel 4199)
- Seibel 5898 Rougeon (a crossing of Jaeger 70 and Seibel 3015)
- Seibel 6150 (a crossing of Seibel 405 and Flot rouge)
- Seibel 6268 (a crossing of Seibel 4614 and Seibel 3011)
- Seibel 6468 (a crossing of Seibel 4614 and Seibel 3011)
- Seibel 6905 Le Subéreux
- Seibel 7042 (a crossing of Seibel 5351 and Seibel 6268)
- Seibel 7053 Chancellor
- Seibel 8216 (a crossing of Seibel 5410 & 5001)
- Seibel 8357 Colobel
- Seibel 8665
- Seibel 8724
- Seibel 8745 Seinoir
- Seibel 9110 Verdelet
- Seibel 9549 De Chaunac
- Seibel 10173 Ambror
- Seibel 11803 Rubilande
- Seibel 10878 Chelois
- Seibel 13053 Cascade (a crossing of Seibel 7042 and Gloire de Seibel)
- Seibel 14514 Dattier précoce de Seibel
- Seibel 14596 Bellandais

== See also ==
- French Wine
- Vineyard
- Hybrid grapes
