= Joannes Seyve =

French biochemist

Joannes Seyve (1900–1966) was a French biochemist who often used Seibel wine grape hybrids first produced in the 1860s. He created the Chambourcin grape, a French hybrid variety that is grown extensively in the Midwest and Northeast United States. His variety Joannes-Seyve 23.416 was crossed with Gewürztraminer to produce the Traminette grape.

His father Bertille Seyve (1864–1939), and brother Bertille Seyve Jr. (1895–1959) also produced new hybrid Grape varieties (identified as Seyve-Villard), including Seyval blanc and Villard Noir.
