= New York Farm Winery Act of 1976 =

The New York Farm Winery Act of 1976 is a law that allows grape growers in New York to establish wineries and sell directly to the public, subject to a maximum of 50,000 US gallons (190,000 L) annually.

In the early 1970s, John Miller, of Benmarl Winery, and John Dyson, commissioner of agriculture, put together a plan to help revitalize the New York wine industry, which was floundering at the time. Governor Hugh Carey signed the plan into law in 1976. The law allowed small grower-producers to sell directly to consumers, as well as reducing certain fees and providing tax and marketing advantages. Originally, the law required farm wineries to sell only estate-grown wines, but it was amended in 1978 to allow the use of any New York-grown grapes in wine sold at a farm winery.
