= Jaeger 70 =

Variety of grape

Jaeger 70 (also known as Munson) is a hybrid of two American grape species, Vitis lincecumii and Vitis rupestris developed by Hermann Jaeger (1844–1895), a Swiss-American who settled in Missouri. He named the successful hybrid for his friend and fellow grape breeder, T.V. Munson. However the grape has become better known by Jaeger's selection number, 70. The grape's primary importance is as the female progenitor of many French - American hybrid grapes in the breeding program run by viticulturist Albert Seibel, whose crosses are known as Seibel grapes.

== Relationship to other grapes ==
Jaegar 70 was crossed with the Languedoc-Roussillon wine grape Aramon noir to create the hybrid variety Flot rouge.
