= Chancellor (grape) =

Variety of grape

- Grape (Vitis)
- Color of berry skin: Noir
- Species: Interspecific crossing
- Also called: Seibel 7053 and other synonyms
- Origin: France
- VIVC number: 2446

Chancellor is a hybrid wine red grape variety produced by French viticulturist Albert Seibel c. 1860. It is also known as Seibel 7053 and is a cross of Seibel 5163 and Seibel 880.

The grape produces a fruity red wine. It is susceptible to both downy and powdery mildew.

== Synonyms ==
Chancellor is also known under the synonyms or breeding codes S 70-53, S-7053, Seibel 70-53, and Seibel 7053.
