= Chelois =

Variety of grape

- Grape (Vitis)
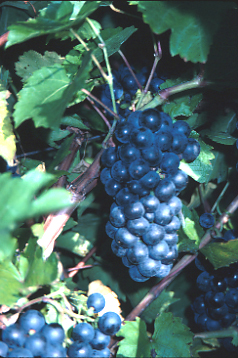
- Color of berry skin: Noir
- Notable regions: Ardèche, France
- Hazards: Drought, Botrytis bunch rot, Eutypa die back, powdery mildew, crown gall, black rot, downy mildew, anthracnose
- VIVC number: 2519

Chelois (French: [ʃəlwa]) is a variety of hybrid grape used in the production of red wines. The fruit are small blue-black berries, which appear in compact, medium-sized clusters. Chelois is among the less hardy hybrids of red-wine grapes.

== History and origins ==
Chelois is an interspecific hybrid developed by viticulturist Albert Seibel in Ardèche, France. It was one of thousands of French-American hybrid grapes developed by scientists to combat powdery mildew and phylloxera, which infiltrated France in the 18th century. The naturally resistant American grape Vitis labrusca was combined with Europe's Vitis vinifera to prevent the eradication of Europe's vineyards.

It was introduced to Canada in 1946 and was registered in the United States in 1948. There is anecdotal evidence that it existed in Oregon prior to 1946. It largely disappeared within the next decade, due to its susceptibility to Tomato Ringspot Virus.

=== Offspring ===
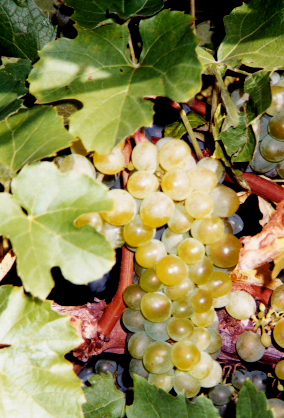
Ventura grapes, a hybrid of Chelois and Elvira.

In 1974, Chelois was crossed with Elvira (a white grape) to produce a hybrid called Ventura, designated as a white grape. The Ventura grape is very productive and cold hardy.

== Viticulture ==
Chelois grapevines are vigorous and productive with an upright growth habit. The buds break late, reducing the risk of damage due to late frost. It ripens early. Secondary buds are capable of producing a small crop. To prevent over-cropping, thinning of clusters may be necessary. Chelois is highly susceptible to Botrytis bunch rot, Eutypa die back, Phomopsis stem and leaf spot, and powdery mildew. It is also susceptible to crown gall, black rot, downy mildew and anthracnose, but to a lesser degree.

It is moderately hardy in cold temperatures (-10 to -15 °F).

== Winemaking ==
Among French-American hybrid grapes, the wine quality of Chelois ranks highly.

== Wine regions ==
=== Ardeche, France ===
Chelois was first developed in France by Albert Seibel in an attempt to produce hardy grape varieties that could withstand powdery mildew and phylloxera.

=== Oregon, United States ===
King's Raven Winery and Epyllion Vineyard, both near Oregon City, Oregon, produce small quantities of Chelois wine.

=== New York, United States ===
Acreage planted with Chelois decreased drastically in New York during the 1980s when demand for red wine lessened. In the early 1990s, interest in the variety resurged as interest in red wine increased.

=== Michigan, United States ===
Nathaniel Rose Wine consistently produce small quantities of varietal Chelois from fruit grown in the Domaine Berrien Vineyard.
