= Juozas Kudirka =

Lithuanian ethnologist

Juozas Kudirka (March 13, 1939 – June 21, 2007) was a Lithuanian ethnologist, habilitated doctor of sciences in humanities.

He graduated from Vilnius University in 1965 majoring in history. His diploma work was Veiveriai Teacher's Seminary (Lithuanian: Veiverių mokytojų seminarija). In 1969 he earned his Candidate of Sciences degree in historical sciences after the post-graduate course at the Institute of History of the Lithuanian Academy of Sciences, which was soon promoted to the highest Soviet-time scientific degree of Doctor of Sciences, with the thesis Pottery in Lithuania (Lithuanian: Puodininkystė Lietuvoje), which in 1973 was published as a book Lietuvos puodžiai ir puodai (Lithuanian Potters and Pots). In 1995 he earned the dr.hab. degree in ethnology.

His works significantly contributed to the preservation and popularization of folk traditions and cultural revival of Lithuania. In particular, he was instrumental in the restoration of the calendar of traditional Lithuanian holidays in post-Soviet Lithuania.

== Books ==
Kudirka wrote 23 books, including:

- Lietuvos puodžiai ir puodai (1973)
- Valstiečių verslai (with Vacys Milius and Angelė Vyšniauskaitė, 1983)
- Lietuvių liaudies meno šaltiniai (1986)
- Lietuviai: etniniai bruožai (1991)
  - Translated as The Lithuanians: An Ethnic Portrait, Lithuanian Folk Culture Centre, 1991
- Užgavėnės (1992), about the Užgavėnės festival
- Lietuviškos Kūčios ir Kalėdos (1993)
- Lietuvių sportiniai žaidimai (1993)
- Vilniaus verbos (Vilnius Easter Palms), 4 volumes (1993)
- Lietuviškoji Veiverių mokytojų seminarija (1996)
- Seven popular books about holidays (Easter, Christmas, Saint Jonas Day, St. George's Day, Mother's Day, Mardi Gras).
- Apso ir Pelekų lietuviškoji kultūra ("Lithuanian culture of Opsa and Pelikany") (1997)
  - Describes traditions of weddings, births and funerals in the two villages with Lithuanian population in Belarus
- Plikių kaimo papročiai (Plikiai Village Customs, 1998).
  - Detailed descriptions of weddings and smaller descriptions of baptisms and funerals of Lithuanians in a Belarusian village, as well as some archaic custos preserved in the village

== Awards ==
- 1999: Jonas Basanavičius Prize for his research on ethnic culture in the borderlands. Significant material was collected by J. Kudirka about traditional culture in ethnic Lithuanian lands in Belarus. Part of it was used in publications about calendar holidays.
