= New York wine =

Wine made from grapes grown in New York, US

New York
- Wine region
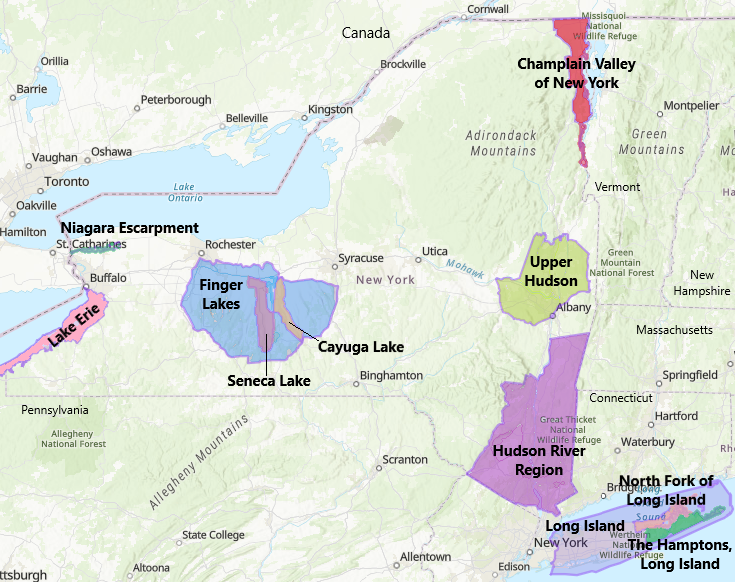
- Map of American viticultural areas
- Official name: State of New York
- Type: U.S. State Appellation
- Year established: 1788
- Years of wine industry: 136
- Country: United States
- Sub-regions: Champlain Valley of New York AVA, Cayuga Lake AVA, Finger Lakes AVA, Hudson River Region AVA, Lake Erie AVA, Long Island AVA, Niagara Escarpment AVA, North Fork of Long Island AVA, Seneca Lake AVA, The Hamptons, Long Island AVA
- Climate region: Continental (also maritime and humid subtropical on Long Island)
- Precipitation (annual average): 30 to 50 in (762–1,270 mm)
- Total area: 30 million acres (47,126 sq mi)
- Size of planted vineyards: 11,000 acres (4,452 ha)
- No. of vineyards: 962
- Grapes produced: 150,000 tons
- Varietals produced: Aurore, Baco noir, Cabernet Franc, Cabernet Sauvignon, Catawba, Cayuga, Chambourcin, Chancellor, Chardonnay, Chelois, Chenin blanc, Colobel, Concord, De Chaunac, Delaware, Diamond, Elvira, Frontenac, Gewürztraminer, Isabella, Ives noir, Leon Millot, Marechal Foch, Melody, Merlot, Niagara, Pinot blanc, Pinot gris, Pinot noir, Riesling, Rougeon, Saperavi, Sauvignon blanc, Seyval blanc, St. Vincent, Steuben, Traminette, Vidal blanc, Vignoles, Vincent
- No. of wineries: 400
- Wine produced: 27.9 million US gallons (106 million litres) (2024)

New York wine refers to wine made from grapes grown in the U.S. state appellation of New York. New York ranks second in grape production by volume after California, having produced 27.9 million US gallons (106 million litres) in 2024. The majority of New York's grape area is planted to Vitis labrusca varieties (mostly Concord). The rest is equally divided between Vitis vinifera and French hybrids.

== History ==
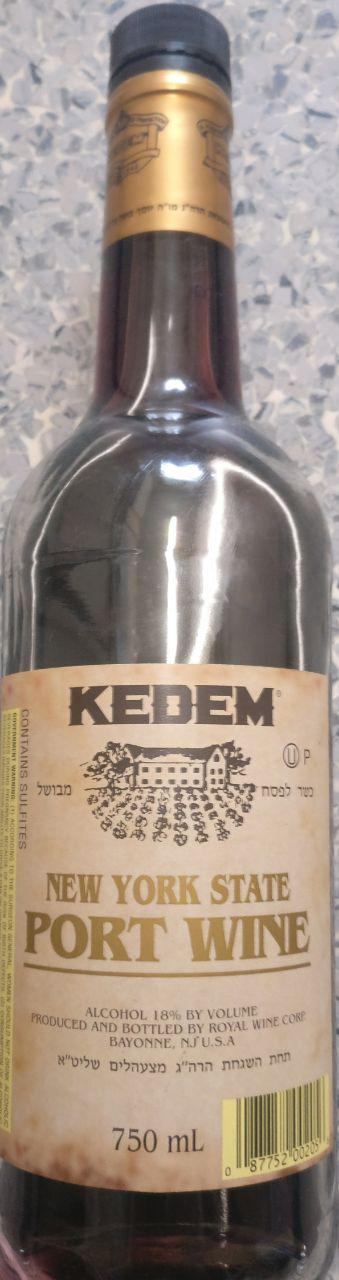
Kosher New York Port wine (bottled in New Jersey)

The state of New York's wine production began in the 17th century with Dutch and Huguenot plantings in the Hudson Valley region. Grapes were first planted on Manhattan Island in 1647 and in 1667 by French Huguenots in Ulster County, marking the earliest documented viticulture in the state. Commercial production did not begin until the 19th century. The first commercial vineyard and winery in the Hudson Valley was established in 1827 at Croton Point, and the first Finger Lakes vines were planted in 1829 by Rev. William Bostwick. New York is home to the first bonded winery in the United States of America, Pleasant Valley Wine Company, located in Hammondsport. It is also home to America's oldest continuously operating winery, Brotherhood Winery in the Hudson Valley, which has been making wine for almost 175 years.

In 1951 Konstantin Frank emigrated from Ukraine to New York, to work at Cornell University's Geneva Experiment Station. Frank went on to become one of the major architects of modern Finger Lakes viticulture industry. Frank and Charles Fournier proved that Vitis vinifera could survive in New York's cold climate, sparking a statewide shift towards European grape varieties and dramatically improving wine quality.

In 1976, when the New York Farm Winery Act was passed, the state had only 19 wineries, all located in the Finger Lakes and Long Island regions. By 1985, there were 63 wineries in the two regions. This act triggered an increase in wineries enabling small family run operations and establishing the foundation of New York's modern wine renaissance. New York now has over 470 wineries statewide, reflecting the long term impact of the 1976 legislation.

In 2011, the New York wineries were given another boost when Governor Andrew Cuomo signed the Fine Winery Law (S.4143A.7828-A) into law, allowing each farm winery to operate up to 5 tasting rooms as a single entity, rather than requiring a separate license for each. The act also streamlined the paperwork involved in direct shipping wine to customers, and allowed wineries to use custom-crush facilities or rent equipment and space from existing wineries, rather than requiring wineries to own all their equipment.

== Wine grapes ==
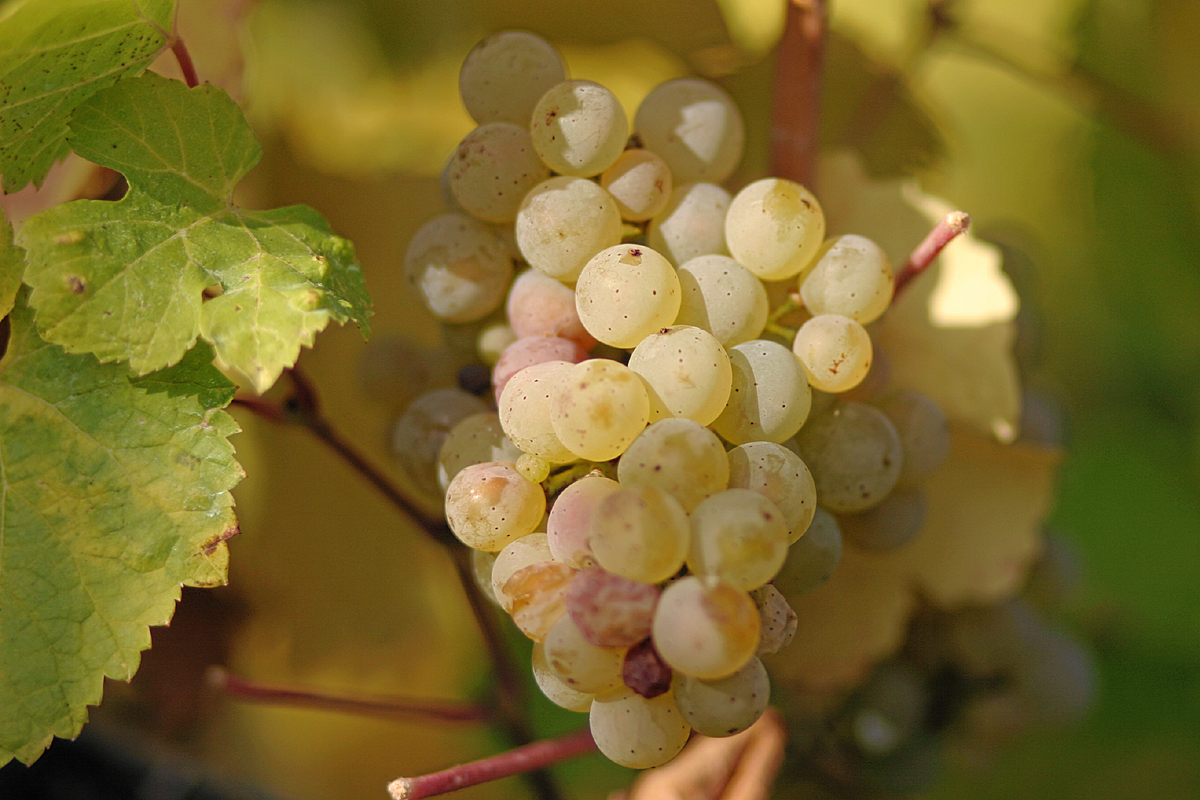
Vitis vinifera, Riesling grapes are used to make some of the highest quality New York wines and others use French, American hybrids and Vitis labrusca.

The Vitis vinifera varieties account for less than 10% of the wine produced in New York. Plantings of vinifera have increased nearly 400% since 1980, reflecting a long term shift toward European varieties even though hybrids and native grapes still dominate total volume.Important American hybrid grapes grown in New York include Catawba, Delaware, Niagara, Elvira, Ives and Isabella. Concord and Niagara became foundational to New York's juice and table grape industries, shaping regional production for more than a century. French hybrid grapes grown in New York include Aurore, Baco noir, De Chaunac, Seyval blanc, Cayuga, Vidal and Vignoles. Several of these, especially Cayuga and Traminette, were developed at Cornell’s Geneva Experiment Station specifically for cold hardy, disease resistant varieties suited to New York’s climate. Vignoles is particularly used in late harvest wines and ice wines. Of the Vitis vinifera varieties, Riesling is noted for the most consistent and best quality wines, while wine made from Chardonnay grown in the Finger Lakes AVA is noted to take on characteristics of leaner styled Burgundy white wine. Riesling and Cabernet Franc are signature vinifera grapes for New York, Riesling especially as it is associated with the Finger Lakes’ glacial lake meso climates.

== Growing regions ==
Over the last 20 years, the quality of New York wines has evolved immensely particularly in the two leading wine regions of Finger Lakes and Long Island. Viticulture in the Finger Lakes region began in 1829, while Long Island's first commercial vineyard and winery was established in 1973. Both regions experienced rapid growth after the 1976 Farm Winery Act, with small family run wineries driving improvements in quality and regional identity.

Since 2016, New York has been resident of eleven designated American Viticultural Areas (AVA). They are Champlain Valley, Long Island, North Fork of Long Island, The Hamptons, Long Island; Hudson River Region; Finger Lakes, Seneca Lake, Cayuga Lake, Niagara Escarpment, Upper Hudson and the northern portion of the multi-state Lake Erie AVA. These AVA's reflect distinct combinations of climate, soils, and water moderated meso climates, especially around the Finger Lakes and Long Island’s maritime zone. New York is one of the most AVA diverse states in the United States as each region produces different signature styles.

The soils originated from ice-age glacial drift and erosion which left gravel and shale type soils with heavy clay deposits in the Finger Lakes region and sandy soil in the Long Island region. The climate differs amongst the regions based on the Atlantic Gulf Stream, Lake Ontario, Lake Erie and the numerous bodies of water and mountainous regions throughout the state. The annual precipitation ranges from 30 to 50 inches (762–1,270 mm). The growing season in the Lake Erie and Finger Lakes regions ranges from 180 to 200 days a year, while on Long Island, the season extends to 220 days and the humidity is higher, and the fall precipitation is somewhat higher as well. Champlain Valley has the shortest growing season of 150 days suitable for growing North American hybrid varieties of grapes but is too short for reliable cultivation of vitis vinifera grapes. Glacial till dominates the Finger lakes while Long Island's deep and well drained sandy loam supports Bordeaux style reds. Moderating effects of Seneca and Cayuga Lakes, which create some of the warmest meso climates in the state despite the region’s northern latitude.

As of 2019, there were 470 wineries in New York. New York's winery count has continued to rise, making it the third largest wine producing state by volume, and it is one of the fastest growing in the number of small producers.

The Adirondack Coast Wine Trail, established in 2014, includes seven small vineyards/wineries (under 15 acres), including one combined apple winery and cider house, along the Adirondack Coast in northeastern New York, between Mooers and Morrisonville.

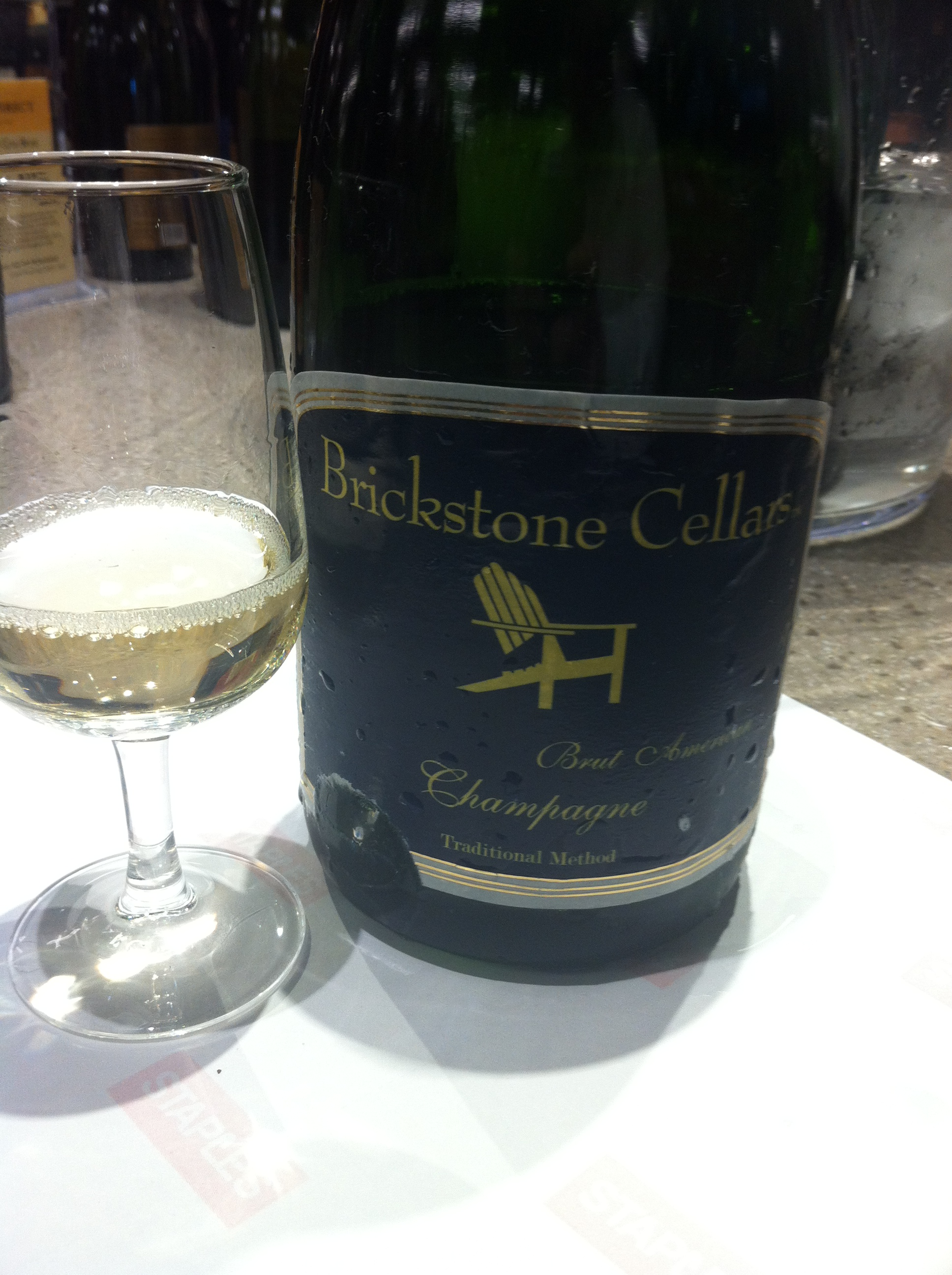
Finger Lakes sparkling wine

== Cultivation, production, and economic impact ==
A report in 2020, commissioned by the New York Wine & Grape Foundation, estimated that in the preceding year, 35,000 acres in New York states are used for wine cultivation, of which 11,000 acres are for wine grapes, and most of the rest are for juice grapes. The report estimated that in 2019, the state produced approximately 57,000 tons of wine grapes valued at $37.28 million (compared to approximately 128,000 tons of juice grapes valued at $28.80 million). The report estimated that the state's wine and grape industry generated a total in $2.4 billion in federal, state, and local taxes, including business, excise, and sales taxes. New York's grape and wine sector contributes billions annually to the national economy and remains one of the largest agricultural industries in the state. New York's 1,631 family owned vineyards and 37,000 acres of grapes form the backbone of the economy, with juice grapes still representing roughly 73% of total grape production.

A 2017 report commissioned by the New York Wine & Grape Foundation estimated that the New York wine industry supported 62,000 direct jobs paying $2.4 billion in wages. About 37% of New York produced wine was sold through wholesalers; the rest was sold by wineries in their tasting rooms, or distributed by wineries to restaurants and shops in the state.
