= Hermann Jaeger =

Swiss-American viticulturist

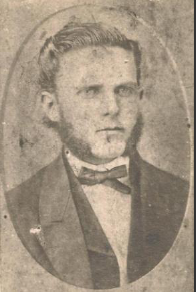
- Hermann Jaeger, c. 1880
- Born: March 23, 1844; Brugg, Switzerland
- Died: May 1895, age 51 unknown
- Occupations: enologist, scientific journalist, vintner, viticulturist, writer
- Writing career
- Period: 1865–1895

Hermann Jaeger (March 23, 1844 – c. May 17, 1895) was a Swiss-American viticulturist, honored as a Chevalier of the Legion of Honor for his part in saving the French wine industry from the phylloxera root louse pest.

== Early life ==
Hermann Jaeger was born on March 23, 1844, in Brugg, Switzerland, the sixth child of Charles and Mary Custer Jaeger. His father was a farmer and merchant and his mother had half-siblings who were the grandchildren of Swiss educator, Johann Heinrich Pestalozzi. Jaeger was educated in public schools until the age of sixteen and then served an apprenticeship at a dry good store from 1860 to 1863. In 1863 he worked at a wine business near Lake Geneva.

In 1864, Jaeger emigrated to the United States, arriving first at the port of Norfolk, Virginia. In 1865, he settled on a 40-acre farm near Neosho in Newton County, Missouri. Shortly afterwards, his brother John settled on an adjoining 40-acre property. They merged their farms and in 1866, they planted their first vineyards.

== Viticulture ==
While his brother, John, tended to the farming, Hermann Jaeger experimented with new grape varieties he created by grafting vine cuttings brought from the East Coast with the root stock of grapes that were native to the region. When he was not grafting and propagating his hybrids, Jaeger could be found exploring the countryside in search of new wild grape species. Eventually, he would create over 100 new grape varieties. One of his most notable hybrids was Jaeger 70, which became an ancestor of many of today's hybrid grapes.

The eastern cuttings he used in his hybrids unintentionally introduced downy mildew, a potentially devastating blight on vineyards. In response, he developed a solution of sulfur, iron sulfate, and copper sulfate which he applied as a spray on his vines. The treatment was successful and he was acknowledged as a pioneer in the application of chemical sprays to control crop disease.

He readily communicated with other grape experts around the world, sharing information about his work and learning from the works of others. He also wrote articles for scientific and grape journals, explaining the mysteries of grapes and his work on his farm.

== Work with phylloxera ==
After the spectacular success of Missouri wines at the Vienna World Fair of 1851 (this needs editing as there was no world fair until 1873), taking 8 of the 12 medals on offer, the French responded by importing Norton / Cynthiana rootstocks from the US, and unwittingly introducing phylloxera, which then ravaged the vineyards of France, Spain, and Portugal during the 1870s. Jaeger, working with the Missouri state entomologist George Hussman, had already raised vines with resistance to the pest; he exported 17 boxcars of the resistant rootstock to France, which was to prove the salvation of the European wine industry. In 1893, for his contribution to the grape and wine industries of France, Jaeger was made Chevalier of the Légion d'honneur.

== Business problems ==
For all his success, Jaeger was to be beset by financial problems in the 1890s following the passing of a local law, many years ahead of Prohibition, banning the sale of alcohol in Newton County, Missouri. When his attempts at circumventing the law resulted in indictment, Jaeger left his Neosho vineyard and moved to lands near Joplin, Missouri, where he intended growing fruit and starting a new vineyard.

== Marriages and Children ==
In 1872, Jaeger married Eliza Wagenrieder of St. Louis, Missouri; his brother John had earlier married Eliza's sister Anna in 1866. Eliza died at the age of 19 on October 11, 1873, shortly after giving birth to a daughter, Bertha. In 1874, Jaeger married Elise Grosse, also of Saint Louis. Together, they had four children, Herman (1878–1923), Lena (born 1881), Emma (born 1884), and Carl (1892–1950). As his family grew, Jaeger became a trustee of the country school that was established near his farm.

== Death ==
On 16 May 1895, Jaeger bade farewell to his wife and children, telling them he was returning to Neosho to address legal matters. He was never seen by his family again. Several days later, his wife received a letter from him postmarked Kansas City, 157 miles away. Written in German, it was translated and printed in the Newton County News on May 23:

"My Dear, Good Elise: When you read these lines, I won’t be no more alive. The more I think over everything, the more my mind get troubled. It is better I make an end to it, before I get crazy. Since for a length of time I am not able to attend to business. I as a food but I meant it good. Do not hunt for me. I hope to end some place where nobody can’t find me. Dear Elise, you deserve better luck. I hope you will have it yet. Kiss the children. Your unlucky Herman"

Jaeger was never seen again. A police investigation did not find any indication of what might have happened. Rumors and speculation abounded. Some thought he returned to Switzerland or started fresh in California but most felt that he was despondent over business and legal problems and killed himself.
