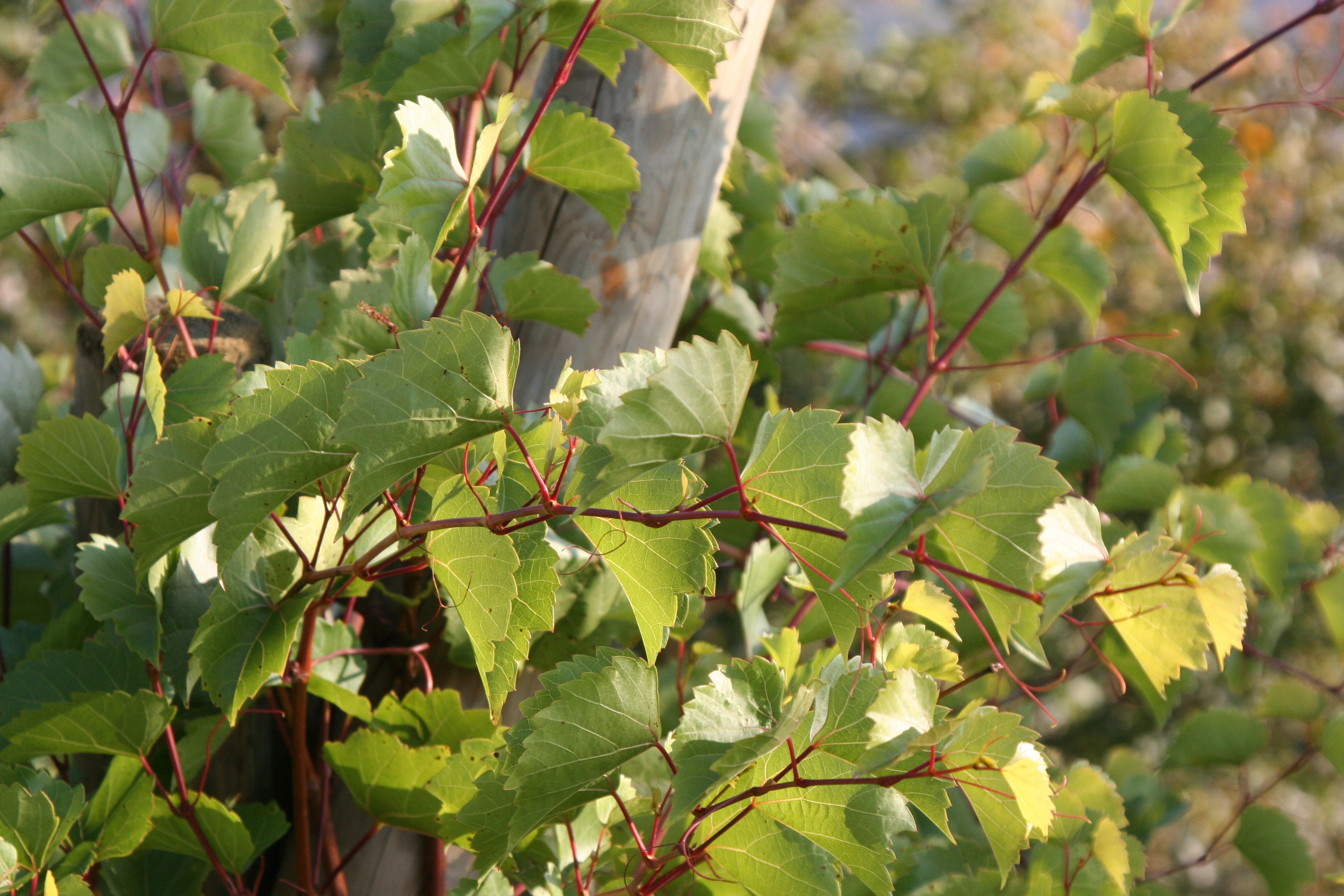

Conservation status
- Vulnerable (NatureServe)

Scientific classification
- Kingdom: Plantae
- Clade: Embryophytes
- Clade: Tracheophytes
- Clade: Spermatophytes
- Clade: Angiosperms
- Clade: Eudicots
- Clade: Rosids
- Order: Vitales
- Family: Vitaceae
- Genus: Vitis
- Species: V. rupestris

Binomial name
- Vitis rupestris Scheele

= Vitis rupestris =

Species of grapevine

Vitis rupestris is a species of grape native to the United States that is known by many common names including July, Coon, sand, sugar, beach, bush, currant, ingar, rock, and mountain grape. It is used for breeding several French-American hybrids as well as many root stocks.

== Distribution and ecology ==
The natural distribution of Vitis rupestris is concentrated in the Ozark Hills of Missouri and Arkansas. The species is less common in scattered populations east as far as Pennsylvania and southwest into Oklahoma and Texas. There are a few reports of the species occurring in the San Francisco Bay area of California, but these are most likely escapes from cultivation.

Vitis rupestris is a self-supporting bushy plant that does not grow in the shade, and is found only on rocky riverbanks and streambanks. Much of its habitat has been destroyed due to damming of rivers and destruction of islands for navigation. Vitis rupestris has been listed as threatened or endangered by Indiana, Kentucky, Pennsylvania, and Tennessee. Known locations of wild Vitis rupestris are quickly disappearing, which may threaten the future of this grape species.

It is found hybridized in parts of its range with the Riverbank grape and other Vitis species.

== Botanical description ==
Growth is tapering, erect, much branched and rarely climbing more than 4 to 8 ft (1.2 to 2.4 m). The roots are slender, wiry and deep, enabling it to resist drought by spreading deep underground to find the water table.

Wood is smooth and red when young, becoming cylindrical and finely striated when mature with dark colored bark that becomes darker with age. Wood is quite persistent with age and dense but not hard. Buds are small, globose or slightly conical. Tendrils are small and crimson colored with short internodes.

Leaves are lanceolate with large stipules with crimson veins. Petiole are deeply and broadly grooved throughout the length. Leaves are distinctly striated and nearly always smooth. Width of the leaves is usually 3 to 4 in (7.6 to 10.2 cm), sometimes 5 in (13 cm) .

Clusters are very small, sometimes shouldered. Rachis is smooth and light green. Flowers are fertile, stamens recurved and bent laterally with flowers producing abundant pollen. Fruits are 1/4 to 1/2 in (6.4 to 12.7 mm) in diameter, round or slightly flattened around the stem and often doubled like two berries coalesced. The berries are black with little bloom, skin is very thin and tender and pulp is tender and melting. Pulp is deeply colored crimson or violet and part clings closely to the skin. The berries bear 3 to 4 small seeds on clusters around 8 in (20 cm) long. Germination is quick and fruit ripens early. The species is able to bear fruit on young shoots pushed out by 2 to 4 year old wood if last year's wood has been lost to winter damage. It propagates easily from cuttings, and the pollen is very prepotent in fertilizing and hybridizing with other Vitis species.

== Pest and disease resistance ==
Has great resistance to drought due to its deep roots penetrating the water table. Where it is unable to do this though it is subject to injury. Foliage is well adapted to resisting fungus and insect attacks, although favored by many grazing mammals. Occasionally attacked by anthracnose but with minimal injury, and resistant to black rot, downy mildew and powdery mildew.

== Cultivars and hybrids ==
Widely used in hybridizing with other species (mostly Vitis vinifera and Vitis lincecumii) to produce disease resistant Hybrid grapes. The species was used extensively to produce varieties able to withstand Phylloxera on their own roots and withstand attacks of Downy mildew.

Breeders that used the species frequently include T.V. Munson, Albert Seibel (see: Seibel grapes), Joannes Seyve and Elmer Swenson (indirectly via hybridizing existing varieties containing V. rupestris. V. rupestris often contributes a large proportion of ancestries of 'French hybrid' grapes (or 'French direct producers') such as Seyval, although it was often overlooked in its homeland in favor of Vitis labrusca.

A large proportion of modern European "PIWI" varieties categorized as V. vinifera contain V. rupestris background such as Solaris and Regent.

The cultivar known as Rupestris St. George has been widely used in breeding and as a root stock. A popular cultivar in Australia is Vitis vinifera 'Ganzin Glory', a hybrid of V. rupestris and V. vinifera, that does not fruit and is grown for its autumn foliage as an ornamental plant.

== Gallery ==
Vitis rupestris

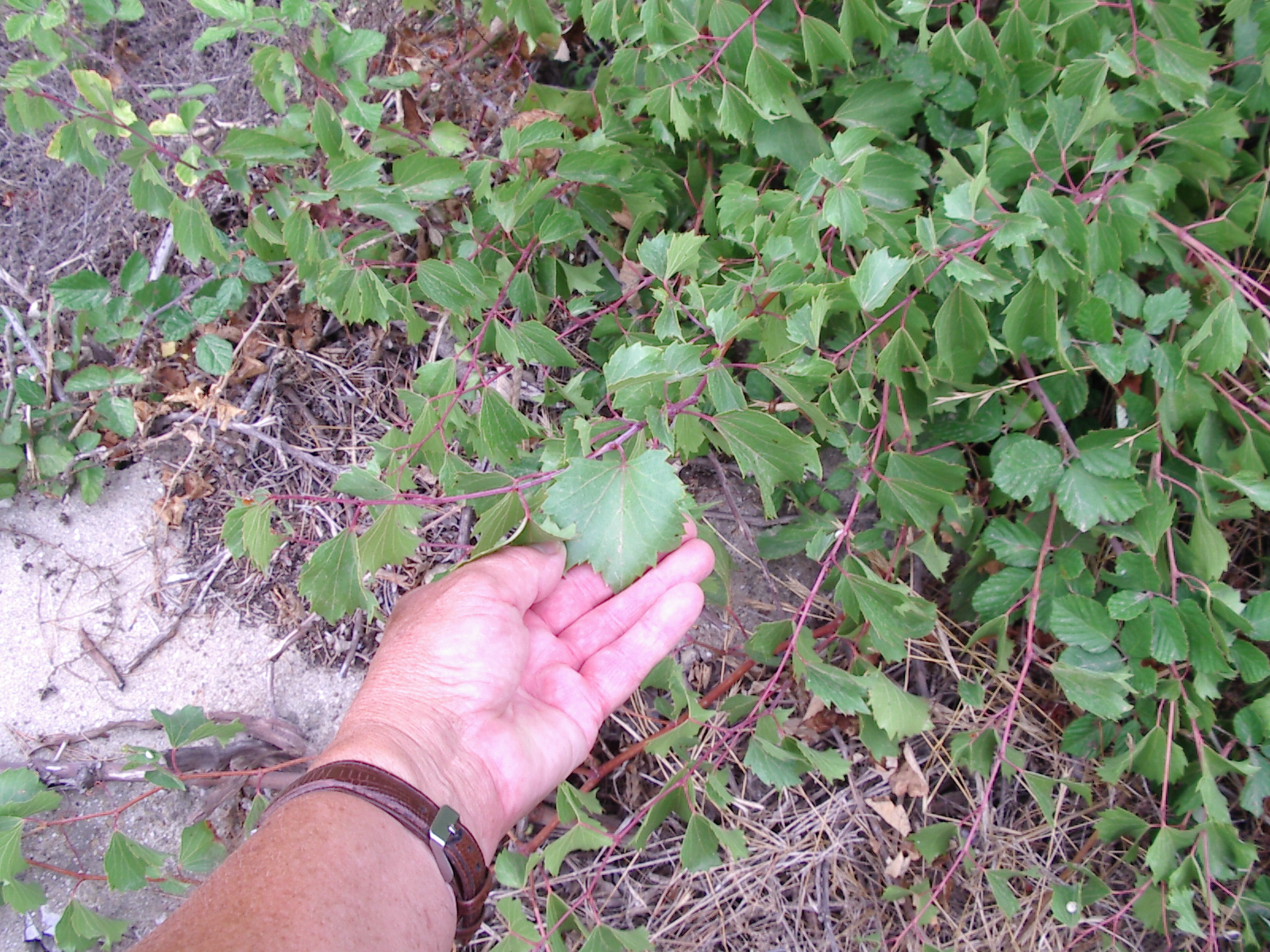
Vitis rupestris growing in Southern France.

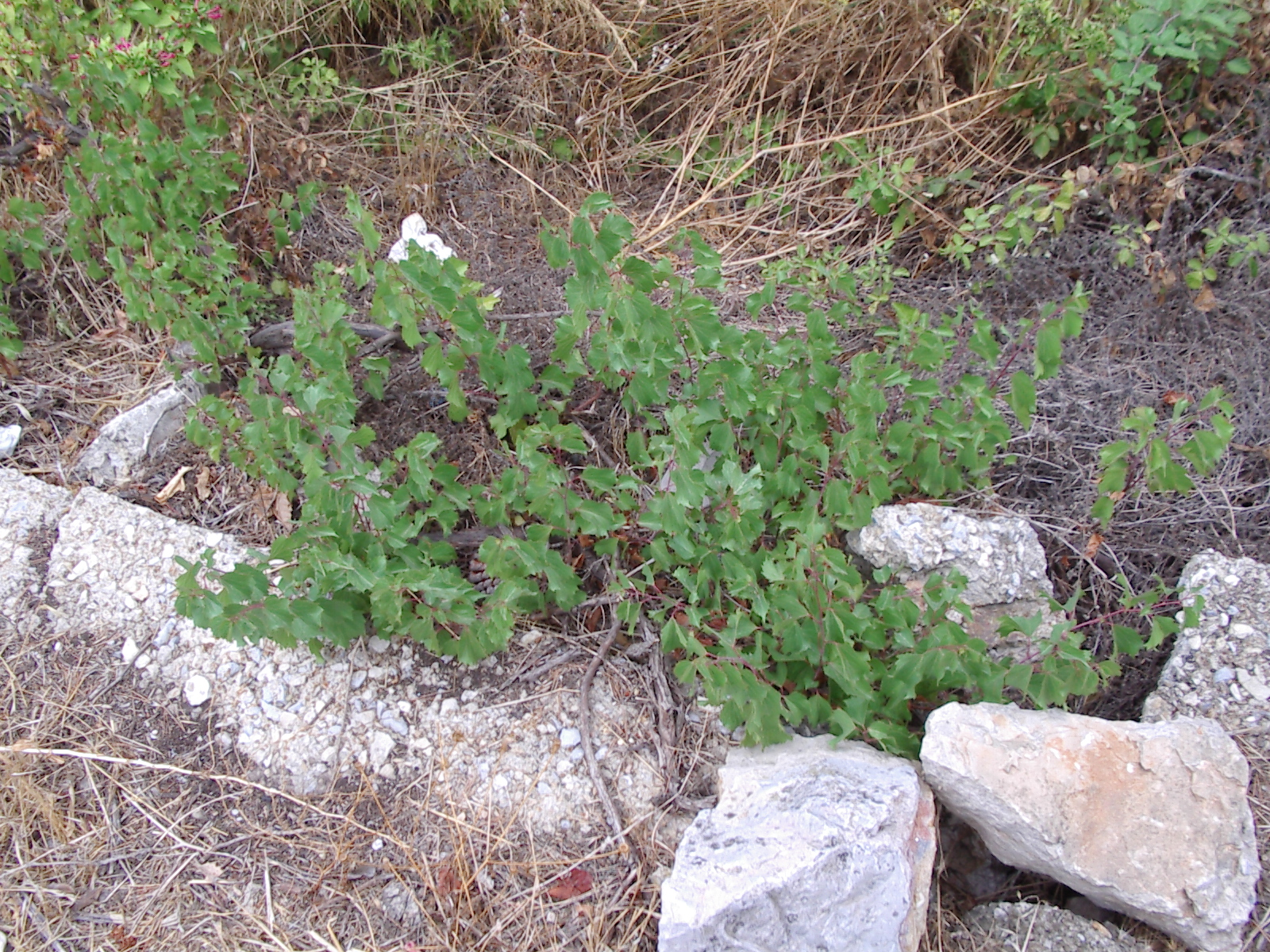
Vitis rupestris growing in Southern France.

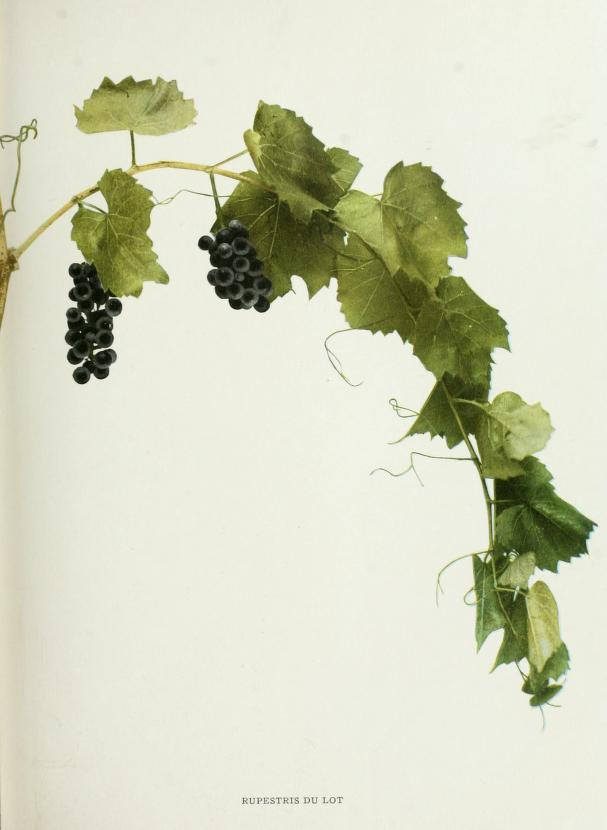
Photograph of Vitis rupestris from the book The Grapes of New York, 1908
