= Couderc =

Couderc is a surname, and may refer to:

- Anne-Marie Couderc (born 1950), French politician and business executive
- Céline Couderc (born 1983), French swimmer
- Joseph-Antoine-Charles Couderc (1810–1875), French operatic tenor/baritone
- Pierre Couderc (1896–1966), French screenwriter, actor, acrobat, and film producer
- Raymond Couderc (born 1946), French politician
- Thérèse Couderc (1805–1885), co-founder of the Sisters of the Cenacle
