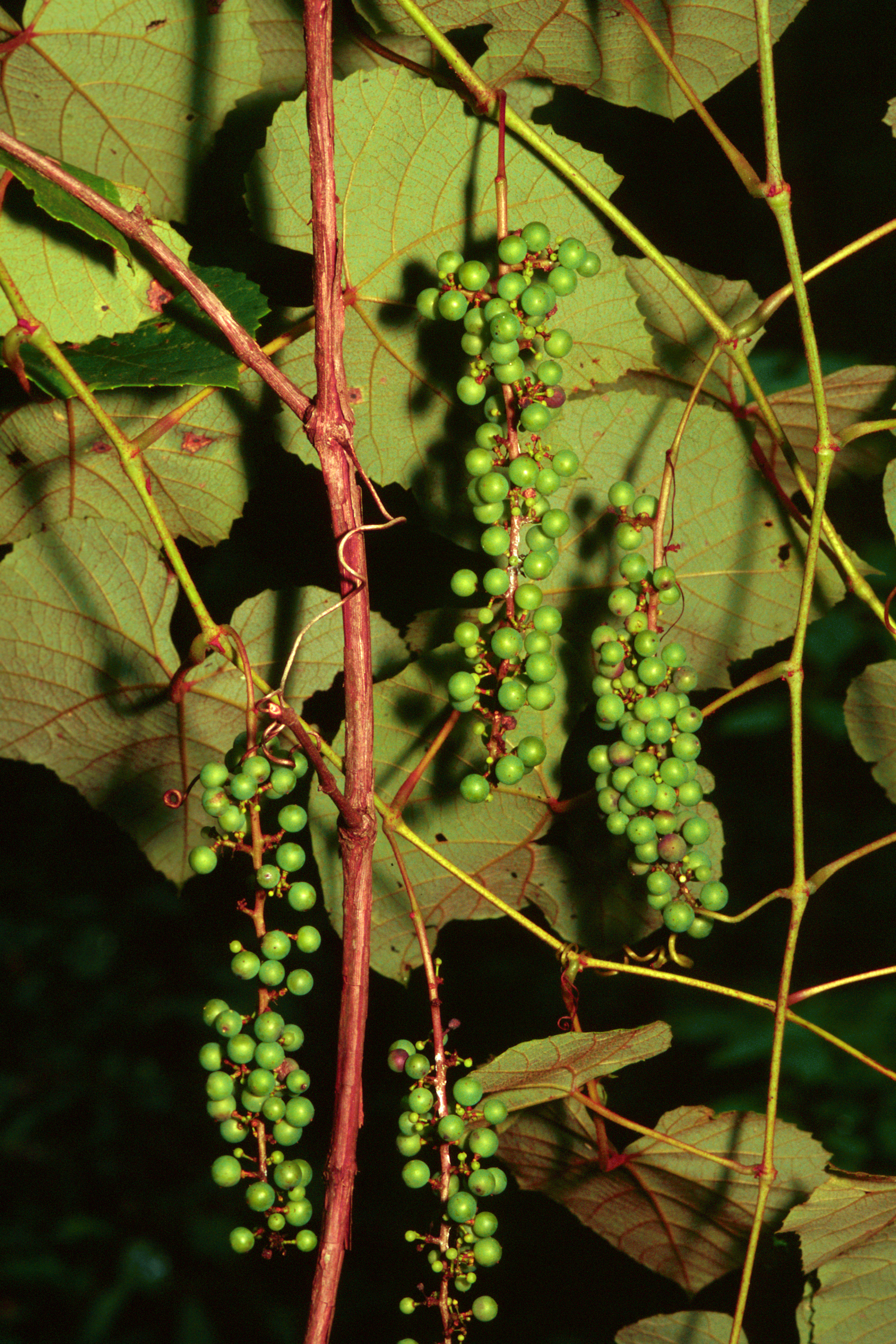

Scientific classification
- Kingdom: Plantae
- Clade: Tracheophytes
- Clade: Angiosperms
- Clade: Eudicots
- Clade: Rosids
- Order: Vitales
- Family: Vitaceae
- Genus: Vitis
- Species: V. aestivalis

Binomial name
- Vitis aestivalis Michx.

= Vitis aestivalis =

Pigeon grape

Species of grapevine

Vitis aestivalis, the summer grape, or pigeon grape is a species of grape native to eastern North America from southern Ontario east to Maine, west to Oklahoma, and south to Florida and Texas. It is a vigorous vine, growing to 10 m (33 ft) or more high on trees. The leaves are 7–20 cm (2.8–7.9 in) long, suborbicular, and usually a little broader than long; they are variable in shape, from unlobed to deeply three- or five-lobed, green above, and densely hairy below. The flowers are produced at every third node in a dense panicle 5–15 cm long. The fruit is a small grape 5–14 mm (0.20–0.55 in) diameter, dark purple or black in colour. It is the official state grape of Missouri. Summer grape prefers a drier upland habitat.

The four varieties are:

- V. a. var. aestivalis
- V. a. var. bicolor Deam (syn. var. argentifolia Fernald; Silverleaf Grape), formerly called Vitis bicolor, but now considered a northern variation of Vitis aestivalis, native range is in the Northeastern United States and parts of Southern Ontario
- V. a. var. lincecumii (Buckley) Munson
- V. a. var. bourquiniana L.H. Bailey, native to the south, sometimes called Vitis bourquiniana, has tomentose undersides to the leaves

== Cultivation and uses ==
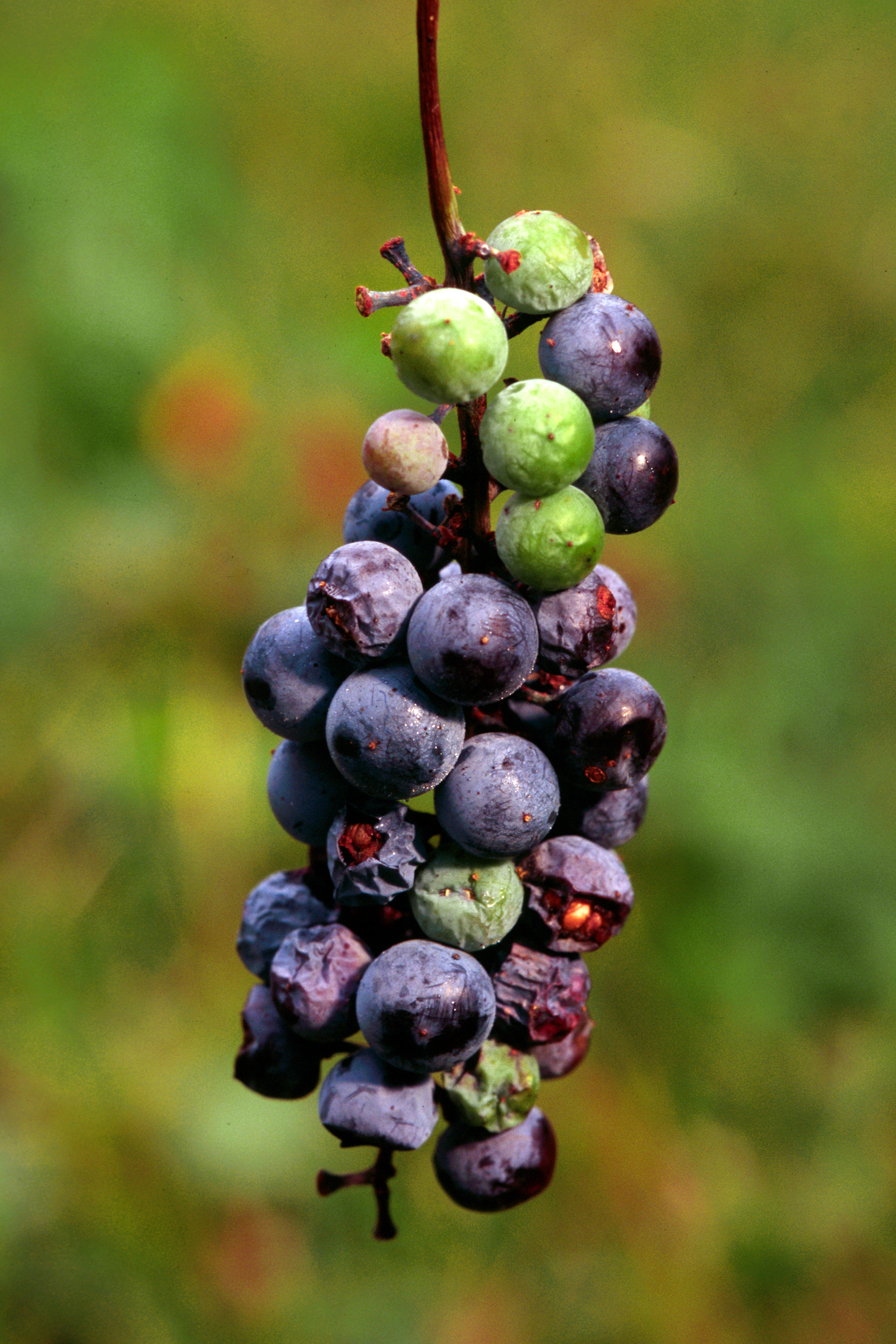
Fruits of Vitis aestivalis

Several cultivars have been selected, including 'Norton', a cultivar with a substantial V. aestivalis background, which is believed to be the oldest American grape cultivar in commercial production.

Inter specific-hybrids made with the species V. aestivalis, such as Norton, have shown several useful traits for commercial wine production when compared with other North American native grape varieties. These traits include: lower acidity, neutral, "vinifera-like" flavour profile, good tannin structure, and excellent disease resistance.

Unlike most other species in genus Vitis, V. aestivalis does not propagate well through dormant cuttings. This has been a limiting factor for its use in commercial viticulture despite the species's promising oenological characteristics. Propagation of V. aestivalis specimens must typically be made through layering or through green cuttings. The species typically does not tolerate highly calcareous soils.

It has been claimed that a variety of V. aestivalis was cultivated by the Cherokees and used in some of their sacred rituals.

== Gallery ==
Vitis aestivalis

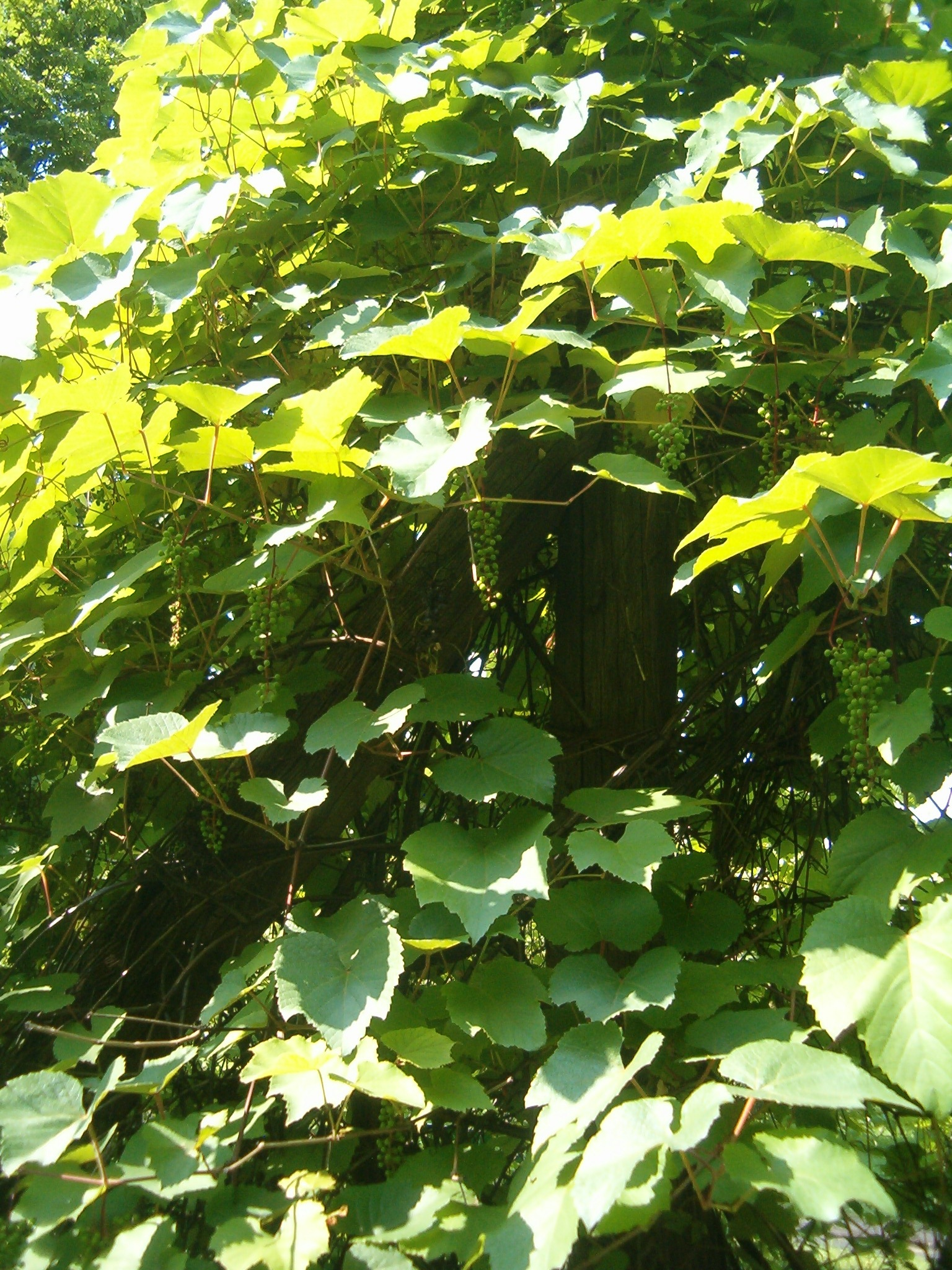

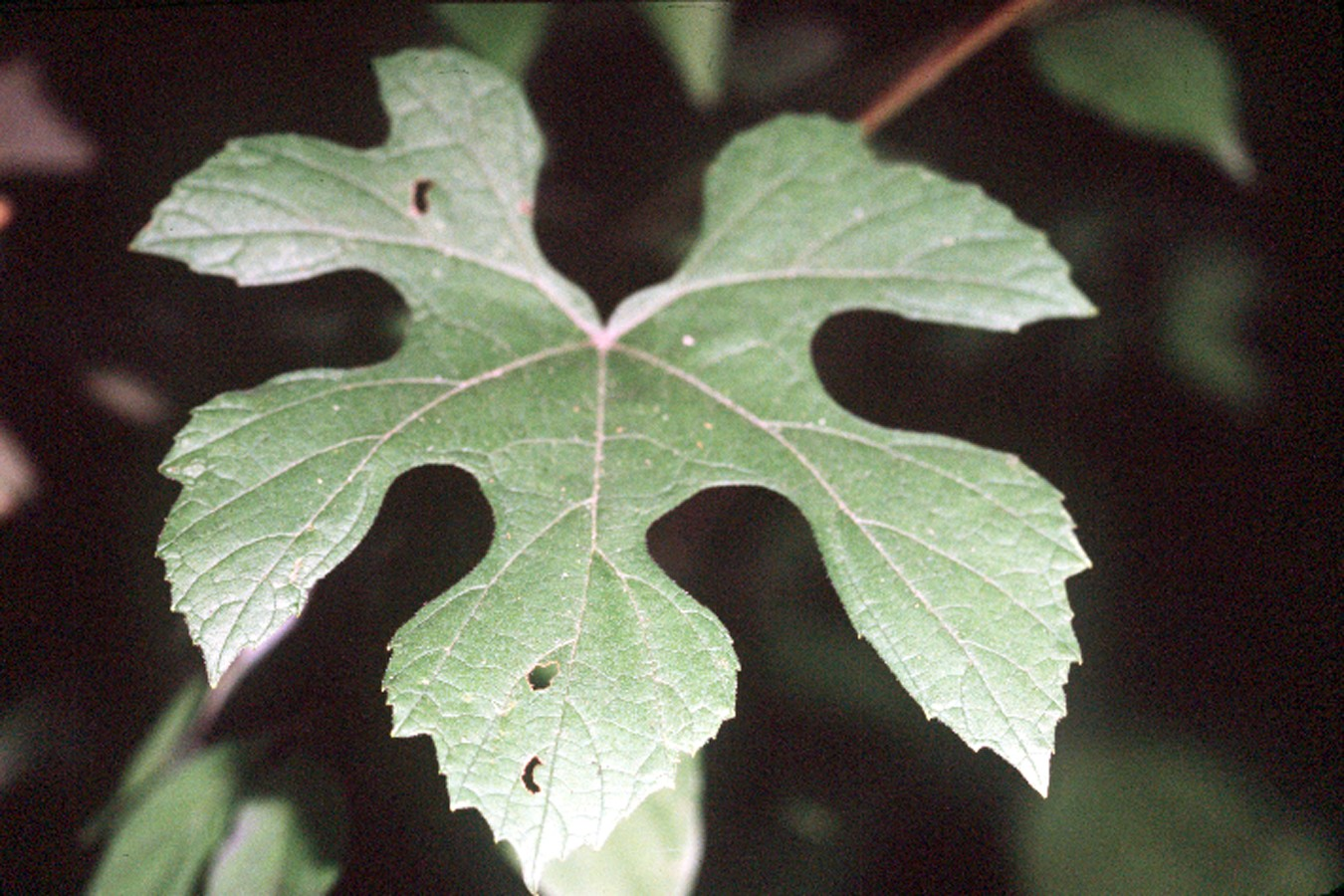

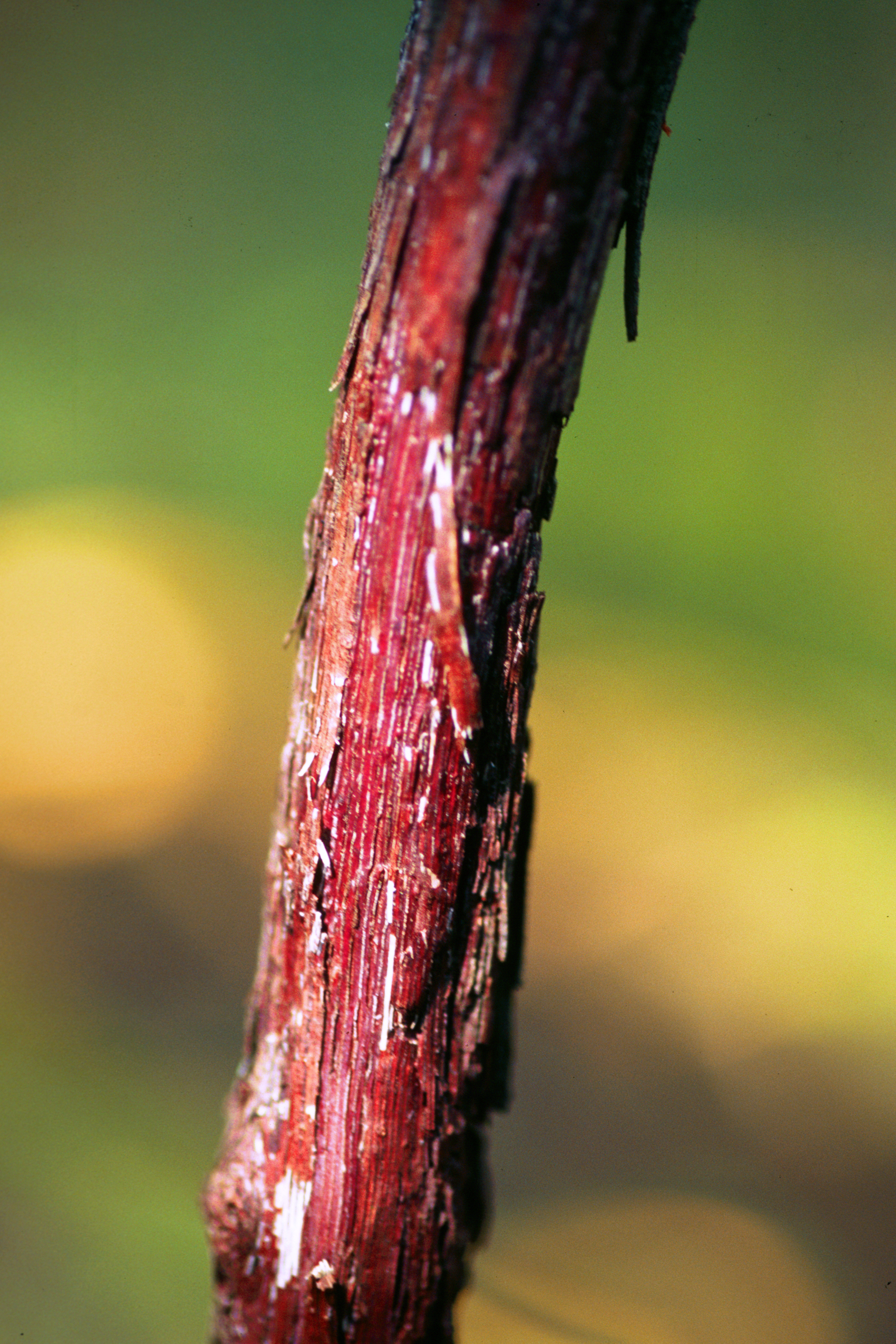

== See also ==
- American wine
- Missouri wine
- New York wine
