= Albert Seibel =

French physician and viticulturist

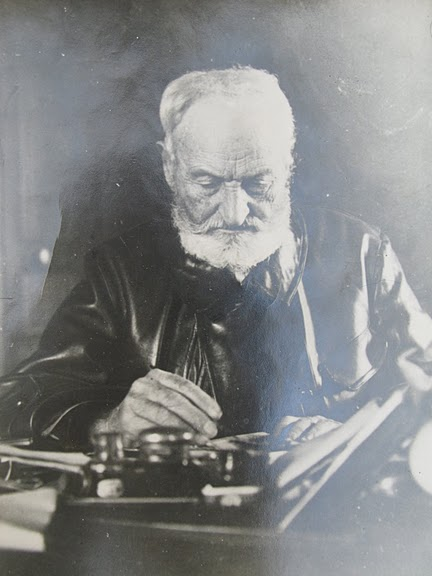
- Born: 1844; Aubenas, Ardèche, France
- Died: 1936
- Known for: Breeding the Seibel series of hybrid grapevines
- Scientific career
- Fields: Viticulture

Albert Seibel (1844–1936) was a French physician and viticulturist who made hybrid crosses of European wine grapes (Vitis vinifera) with native North American grapes. His crosses are known as Seibel grapes.

== Biography ==
Seibel was born in Aubenas in Ardèche department in Southern France in 1844. In 1895, he founded a school to teach grafting methods. He died in 1936.

== Breeding programme ==
In the 1860s the Phylloxera plague cut European wine production by more than two-thirds. As the pest originated in the New World, crossing American stock with European Vitis vinifera varieties was one of the promising attempts to contain the disaster. The vines produced by this hybridization did not necessarily produce better wines, but did produce vine stock that could better survive Phylloxera attacks.

Seibel and his company produced over 16,000 new hybrids, with nearly 500 varieties that were then grown commercially. He often used as a female parent the hybrid Jaeger 70, a cross between Vitis lincecumii and Vitis rupestris produced by Hermann Jaeger. Some of the most famous Seibel grapes are Aurore (Seibel 5279), Chancellor (Seibel 7053), Chelois (Seibel 10878), De Chaunac (Seibel 9549).

His grapes were widely planted in France and Brazil. However, other than in countries such as Canada and the United States, Seibel grapes have fallen from favour in recent years due partly to restrictions in European law.

== See also ==
- List of wine personalities
