= Minnesota wine =

Viticulture in Minnesota

Minnesota
- Wine region
- Official name: State of Minnesota
- Type: U.S. State Appellation
- Year established: 1858
- Years of wine industry: 1977-present
- Country: United States
- Other regions in vicinity: Wisconsin, Michigan, Illinois, Iowa
- Sub-regions: Alexandria Lakes AVA, Upper Mississippi River Valley AVA
- Climate region: Region I
- Total area: 49.7 million acres (77,627 sq mi)
- Grapes produced: Chambourcin, Chardonnay, Concord, Delaware, Edelweiss, Frontenac, Geisenheim, Gewürztraminer, Itasca, La Crescent, La Crosse, Leon Millot, Malbec, Marechal Foch, Marquette, Riesling, Sabrevois, Seyval blanc, St. Croix, St. Pepin, Syrah, Vidal blanc, Vignoles, Zinfandel
- No. of wineries: 70+

Minnesota wine refers to wine made from grapes grown in the U.S. state of Minnesota. Minnesota is part of the American Viticultural Area (AVA), specifically the Upper Mississippi River Valley AVA, which includes southwest Wisconsin, southeast Minnesota, northeast Iowa, and northwest Illinois. The state also has a smaller designated American Viticultural Areas, the Alexandria Lakes AVA. Minnesota is a very cold climate for viticulture and many grape varieties require protection from the winter weather by being buried under soil for the season. Minnesota is home to extensive research on cold-hardy French hybrid and other grape varieties.

The Minnesota Grape Growers Association (MGGA) is a statewide organization that promotes grape growing and wine making in the state and also in cold-hardy climates. Minnesota is home to the International Cold Climate Wine Competition (ICCWC) hosted annually in partnership between MGGA and University of Minnesota. This is the only wine competition solely dedicated to the promotion of quality wines made mainly from cold-hardy grape varieties. In 2014, the 6th annual competition saw 284 wines entered from 59 commercial wineries in 11 states. Awards were based on blind tastings by 21 expert judges, who include enologists, wine writers, restaurateurs, retailers, and wine educators.

== History ==
Minnesota's hardy native wild grapes were staples of the indigenous inhabitants, Dakota and Ojibwa, who ate pemmican, a traditional food composed of dried meat, fat, and fruit. Later, European-Americans immigrants, after the American Civil War, produced hybrids crossing native grapes with domestic Vitis species from their homelands. University of Minnesota horticulturists bred grapes throughout the late 19th and early 20th centuries, resulting in four hybrid varieties in 1944. Concurrently, Italian immigrants in northern Minnesota’s Iron Range imported grapes from California to unlicensed, communal wineries. Minnesota’s first winery license was issued shortly after the Repeal of Prohibition to the Old Sibley House Winery, which operated in West St. Paul until 1949 sourcing grapes from outside the state.
In 1973, the first recorded vineyard in Minnesota was planted by David Bailly at Alexis Bailly Vineyard in Hastings and the first modern winery, Northern Vineyards Winery, opened in 1977. The next year, Alexis Bailly Vineyard celebrated its viticulture production of the first commercial wine sourced entirely from Minnesota grapes.
In 1997, only three wineries operated in Minnesota, and currently has grown to over 70 commercial wineries throughout Minnesota.

== Influence of Elmer Swenson ==
Horticulturalist Elmer Swenson created commercially successful, cold-climate varieties in Minnesota including the Edelweiss and St. Croix grapes. Oenology programs at the University of Minnesota developed the Frontenac grape variety in 1995, and continue to research new hybrids and techniques for grape growing in the state and other cold climate regions.

== See also ==
- American wine
- Upper Mississippi Valley AVA
