= Upper Mississippi River Valley AVA =

American Viticultural Area in Illinois, Iowa, Minnesota and Wisconsin

Coordinates: 44°48′08″N 92°30′50″W

Upper Mississippi River Valley
- Wine region
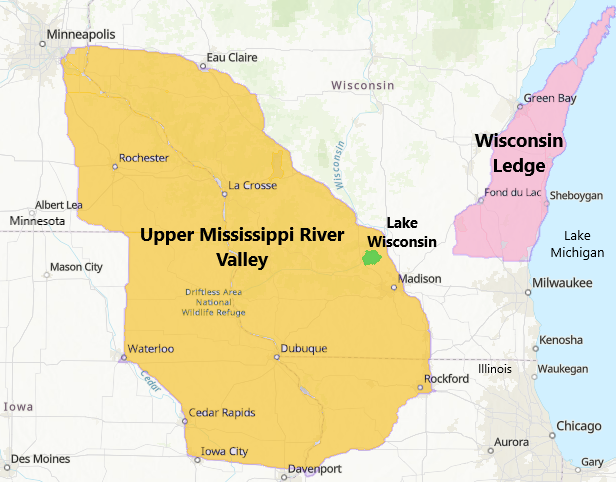
- Type: American Viticultural Area
- Year established: 2009
- Country: United States
- Part of: Illinois, Iowa, Minnesota, Wisconsin
- Sub-regions: Lake Wisconsin AVA
- Growing season: 145–205 days
- Climate region: Region I
- Precipitation (annual average): 30 to 38 in (760–970 mm) snowfall: 35–50 in (89–127 cm)
- Soil conditions: Limestone underneath silt loam and clay
- Total area: 29,914 square miles (19,144,960 acres)
- Grapes produced: Marechal Foch, Frontenac, Saint Croix, Chardonel, Edelweiss

Upper Mississippi River Valley is an American Viticultural Area (AVA) encompassing 29,914 square miles (77,480 km^{2}; 19,145,000 acres) along the Upper Mississippi River and its tributaries located in northwest Illinois, northeast Iowa, southeast Minnesota and southwest Wisconsin. It was established as the nation's 194^{th}, Minnesota, Illinois and Wisconsin's second and Iowa's initial wine appellation on June 22, 2009, as currently, the nation's largest viticultural area, by the Alcohol and Tobacco Tax and Trade Bureau (TTB), Treasury after reviewing the petition submitted by the Upper Mississippi River Valley AVA Committee on behalf of local vintners proposing a viticultural area named "Upper Mississippi River Valley."
The area is 50 times larger than the Bordeaux wine regions of France. The climate of the Upper Mississippi Valley is continental and cool. The rolling hills and sloping landscape of the region permits maximum sun exposure which facilitates grape growth. Vineyards are planted in soils composed of mainly clay and silt loam on top of bedrock of limestone. The plant hardiness zone varies within the large north-to-south range from 4a to 5b.

The Lake Wisconsin viticultural area, established in 1994, contains some geographical features similar to those of the AVA, such as annual average frost-free period, elevation, and a mean precipitation of 29 in (740 mm), just 1 inch less than that of the Upper Mississippi River Valley AVA. At the same time, the Lake Wisconsin AVA is recognized as benefiting from the microclimate effects of the lower Wisconsin River Valley. The river moderates winter temperatures and air circulation within the river valley and helps prevent cold air accumulation and frost pockets from forming in the vineyards. In the summer, the river valley and limestone bluffs along the river's edge serve to channel air currents and increase air circulation, thus protecting the vineyards from mildew and rot in hot, humid weather. Additionally, the Lake Wisconsin AVA is recognized as a transitional zone from unglaciated to glaciated topography, and the soils within the Lake Wisconsin AVA contain some glacial till. Accordingly, although the Lake Wisconsin viticultural area shares some of the characteristics of the AVA, TTB believes that the differences justify the continued recognition of Lake Wisconsin as a distinct viticultural area within the proposed Upper Mississippi River Valley viticultural area.

== History ==
European explorers Jacques Marquette and Louis Joliet first entered the Upper Mississippi River Valley on June 17, 1673. The Louisiana Purchase and the resolution of the Black Hawk War in 1832 served to open the area to settlers from the eastern States. Native grape varieties in the Upper Mississippi River Valley thrived in the late 19th and early 20th centuries. Grapes have been grown in Upper Mississippi River region since the earliest of times. The Vitis riparia is a grape native to the southern half of Minnesota and Wisconsin, where it flourishes along the many riverbanks of the Mississippi and its tributaries. The native Sioux and Ojibwa ate the fresh berries and used the dry fruit in pemmican. They apparently did not, however, ferment the grapes into wine. The early settlers called it the frost grape, as it was best when picked after the first hard frost.

With the influx of settlers in the 1840s and 1850s, grape growing was tried along with all other horticultural pursuits. Varieties developed on the eastern seaboard such as the Concord were somewhat successful. The fruit was commercially used for fresh fruits or preserves. In 1919, Iowa produced the sixth largest grape crop in the United States. By the 1930s grape growing was limited to backyard vineyards for family use only. These eastern varieties were not quite hardy enough and the coldest of winters, together with the growth of the California fresh fruit industry, eventually did the industry in. Prohibition, severe freezes, droughts, and wind drift from some crop sprays caused native viticulture to dwindle throughout much of the 20th century within the area. The disease- and cold-resistant French-American grape hybrids and crop spray improvements developed during the 20th century resulted in renewed confidence in grape growing as an industry in the Upper Mississippi River Valley region. The first winery in this region, Alexis Bailly Vineyard and Winery, was opened in 1973 near Hastings, Minnesota. At the time it was believed that this part of the Upper Mississippi Valley endured winters that were too cold to sustain viticulture.

== Terroir ==
=== Geology ===
The boundaries of the AVA share the unique geographical connection of all being part of the Paleozoic Plateau, also known as the Driftless Area, and therefore do not have the same type of vineyard soils as wine regions that were in areas that experienced glaciation during the last ice age. The geologic history of the Upper Mississippi River Valley viticultural area was the impact of the massive Wisconsin Glacier during the Wisconsin ice age. The glacier, which had lobes in Minnesota and Iowa, started melting 15,000 years ago and retreated northward toward Canada. The resulting glacial water flows combined with the Glacial St. Croix River and drained Glacial Lake Duluth, known now as Lake Superior. The relatively sediment-free drainage of Glacial Lake Duluth helped carve the Upper Mississippi River Valley channel to a depth of about 820 feet (250 m). Eventually, alluvial deposits started refilling the river channel, beginning a process that has continued into modern times. According to the petitioner, the development of the Upper Mississippi River impacted the regional topography and landforms. The tributary valleys include terraces, older flood plain deposits, and entrenched and hanging meanders (streams). These features show the complexity of the alluvial history and river development associated with glacial melting and drainage diversions. The petitioner stated that surface materials, especially along the Paleozoic Plateau, date to 100,000 years in age. The younger materials that are outside the boundary and that are largely the result of glacial erosion and glacial till date to 10,000 years in age, or 90,000 years younger than the surface materials on the Paleozoic Plateau. The petitioner explained that streams in the Upper Mississippi River Valley viticultural area cut deep dissections through the inclined landforms and exposed Paleozoic rock. The exposed rock, which varies in age from 350 to 600 million years old, is predominantly dolomite, limestone, and sandstone.

=== Topography ===
The Driftless Area of the Upper Mississippi River Valley has a unique topography and subsurface structure because a direct glacial incursion did not occur in that area during the most recent Wisconsin Ice Age. Consequently, the topography does not have substantial amounts of materials deposited by glaciers. The petitioner noted that the proposed boundary divides the rugged, dissected, bedrock-controlled landscapes within the Upper Mississippi River Valley from the gently rolling landscapes that have lower relief and glaciated, erosional surfaces and that are outside the valley. Bedrock control in the area, the petitioner explained, refers to the entrenched valleys and karst that constitute an integrated drainage network. The karst topography of the viticultural area includes underground caves, sinkholes, springs, and subsurface caverns. According to the petitioner, rivers and underground water flows are general features throughout the Upper Mississippi River Valley viticultural area, which has none of the natural lakes that direct glacial movement normally creates. Outside the boundary of the Upper Mississippi River Valley viticultural area, the petitioner continued, the topography consists of unconsolidated, heavily dissected soil material along substantial deposits of glacial materials on smooth, rolling hills. The elevations of the Upper Mississippi River Valley viticultural area, the petitioner stated, range from 660 feet (200 m) on valley floors to 1,310 feet (400 m) on high ridges. Outside the boundary of the viticultural area, elevations average 250 feet (76 m) higher to the northwest and 165 feet (50 m) lower to the southeast. The petitioner explained that north of the boundary of the Upper Mississippi River Valley viticultural area loess the level-to-rolling till plains. Elevations change little on the plains. East of the boundary of the Upper Mississippi River Valley viticultural area, the landscape is dominated by a glaciated plain that has belts of morainic hills, ridges, and washout terraces. (TTB notes that morainic hills are accumulations of soil and stones that glacial activity has left.) Also, elevations generally vary several feet, except for the 80-to-330-foot (24–101 m) moraines, drumlins, and bedrock escarpments. South of the boundary of the Upper Mississippi River Valley viticultural area are rolling, hilly, loess-covered plains and some broad, level uplands in the southwest region. Elevations there also generally vary by only several feet, except on the upland flats, where elevation changes up to 200 feet (61 m). West of the boundary of the Upper Mississippi River Valley viticultural area the landscape is a nearly level to gently sloping till plain. Elevations generally vary by several feet.

=== Hydrology ===
The petitioner provided hydrological data that show the growing conditions, including the relationship between the soils and the hydrological characteristics of the Upper Mississippi River Valley viticultural area and its surrounding regions. In most years the moderate precipitation of the Upper Mississippi River Valley viticultural area, the petitioner explained, is usually adequate for both the human population and agriculture. Ground water, the petitioner stated, remains abundant in outwash deposits of valleys, but on uplands it varies in quantity. Bedrock aquifers also provide extensive ground water resources within the viticultural area and in the area to its west.

=== Soils ===
The soils common to the Upper Mississippi River Valley viticultural area are stony or rocky soils on steep slopes. The petitioner provided comparative soil data for the viticultural area and the surrounding regions. The petitioner explained that within the boundary of the Upper Mississippi River Valley viticultural area, Argiudolls (Tama, Dodgeville, Richwood, and Dakota series) and Hapludolls (Muscatine series) are on nearly level to gently sloping benches and broad ridge tops. Hapludolls (Frontenac, Broadale, and Bellechester series) are on steep slopes bordering major valleys. Well drained Udifluvents (Dorchester, Chaseburg, and Arenzville series) are along stream bottoms. Quartzipsamments (Boone series) are on steep slopes. Also, Udipsamments (Plainfield and Gotham series) are on nearly level stream benches. Overall, the soils on steep hills and ridges and those formed in comparatively thinner glacial till within the viticultural area have good natural drainage for grapes. Although they have much clay, generally they have access to water and in numerous areas are on south-facing slopes, creating microclimates beneficial to grapes. The soils outside the boundary generally formed in deeply dissected, thicker glacial drift and alluvium over unconsolidated materials on smooth, gently rolling landscapes. After precipitation they require tile drainage because of glacial pools and the generally lower relief.

=== Climate ===
Steep slopes, bluffs, numerous rock outcrops, waterfalls and rapids, sinkholes, springs, and entrenched stream valleys combine to create multiple microclimates within the Upper Mississippi River Valley viticultural area. Also, the combination of microclimates and diverse settings supports varied flora and fauna communities not found outside the boundary of the viticultural area. The petitioner provided temperature and precipitation data for the Upper Mississippi River Valley viticultural area and its surrounding regions. According to petition data, the Upper Mississippi River Valley viticultural area has, on average, a warmer annual temperature range than that of the surrounding locations to the north and east. In the areas to the south and west, the annual average temperature range is several degrees higher than that in the viticultural area. The annual average frost-free period within the Upper Mississippi River Valley viticultural area is longer than that in the area to the north and shorter than that in the area to the south, according to petition data. The range of the annual frost-free period in the viticultural area is greater than in the neighboring areas to the east and west. The petition data show the precipitation range of the Upper Mississippi River Valley viticultural area as compared to that in the surrounding areas. The annual average precipitation range is higher in the Upper Mississippi River Valley viticultural area than in the area to its north. The areas to the south, west, and east receive approximately the same annual average precipitation, in the same pattern, as the viticultural area. The precipitation during the growing season is greater in the areas to the north, south, and east than in the viticultural area, and approximately the same in the area to the west of the viticultural area.

Marechal Foch

== Viticulture ==
In the Upper Mississippi Valley River AVA, viticultural techniques must be adapted to deal with the cold winters. After harvest, many wineries will take the grapevines down from their trellises. The vines are then pruned and buried under mulch. In the spring, just prior to budding, the vines are then guided back into the trellises to begin the next growing cycle However, with new hybrid varietals developed by the University of Minnesota, these newer vines may stay on the trellises during the cold winters and pruned in February and March.

== Grape varieties ==
The Upper Mississippi River Valley grows mainly hybrid grape varieties like Chardonel, Edelweiss, La Crosse, Marechal Foch, Frontenac, Marquette, and Saint Croix. Research at the University of Minnesota, influenced by the work of horticulturalist Elmer Swenson, have been developing new hybrid grapes that could better withstand the cold winter and ripen earlier.

== See also ==
- American wine
- List of American Viticultural Areas
- Illinois (wine)
- Iowa (wine)
- Minnesota (wine)
- Wisconsin (wine)
