= Iowa wine =

Wine made from grapes grown in Iowa, United States

Iowa
- Wine region
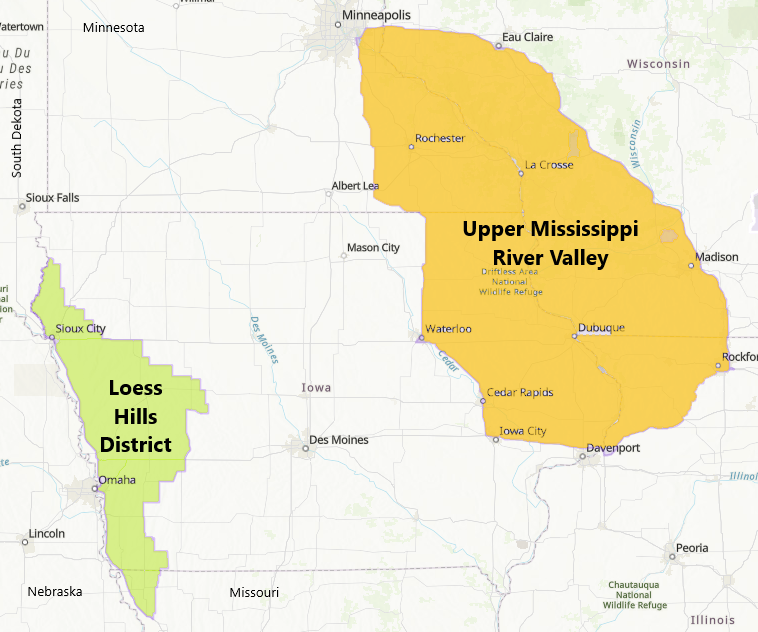
- Iowa AVAs
- Official name: State of Iowa
- Type: U.S. State Appellation
- Year established: 1846
- Years of wine industry: 169
- Country: United States
- Sub-regions: Upper Mississippi Valley AVA, Loess Hills District AVA
- Climate region: Region Ib
- Heat units: 2,222 GDD units
- Precipitation (annual average): 2.51 to 4.15 inches (64–105 mm)
- Soil conditions: clay and gravel base
- Total area: 35.7 million acres (55,857 sq mi)
- Size of planted vineyards: 1,300 acres (526 ha)
- No. of vineyards: 316
- Grapes produced: Bluebell, Catawba, Cayuga, Chambourcin, Chancellor, Chardonel, Concord, De Chaunac, Edelweiss, Frontenac, Frontenac, Geisenheim, La Crosse, Leon Millot, Marechal Foch, Marquette, Niagara, Norton, Seyval blanc, St. Croix, St. Pepin, St. Vincent, Steuben, Traminette, Valiant, Vidal blanc, Vignoles
- No. of wineries: 97

Iowa wine refers to wine made from grapes grown in the U.S. state appellation of Iowa. The state was one of the largest wine producers in the country during the late 19th and early 20th centuries, but Prohibition decimated the industry. Iowa presents many challenges to viticulture including very warm summer days that can promote fungal vine diseases, and extremely cold winter nights that can kill many varieties of grapevines. Most commercial viticulture in Iowa focuses on French hybrid and native American grape varieties, with relatively few plantings of Vitis vinifera grapes. Many Iowa wineries also import grapes and juice from other states and countries in order to produce wine varietals otherwise not possible due to Iowa's harsh winter months that will not permit such grapes to survive. Iowa is home to 100 commercial wineries and more than 300 vineyards covering 1,200+ acres (490+ ha). Northeastern Iowa is included in the Upper Mississippi Valley AVA while the western part of the state is in the new AVA designation named Loess Hills.

== See also ==
- American wine
- Upper Mississippi Valley AVA
- Loess Hills District AVA
