= Alexandria Lakes AVA =

American Viticultural Area in Minnesota

Coordinates: 45°57′51″N 95°23′43″W

Alexandria Lakes
- Wine region
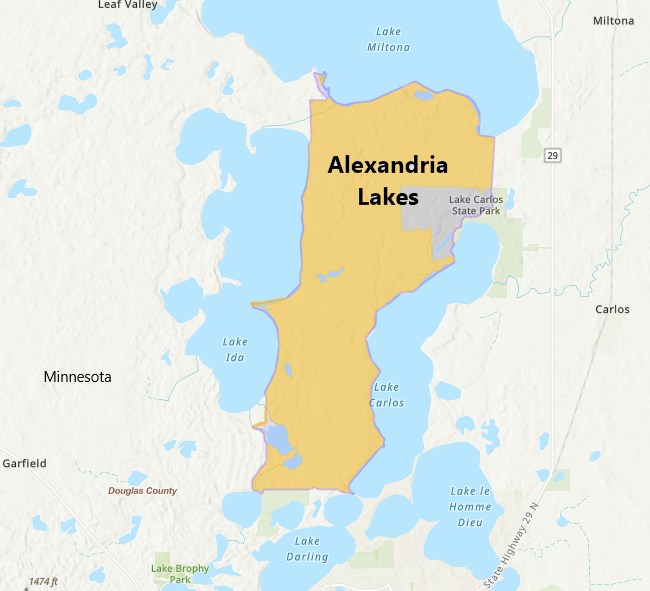
- Type: American Viticultural Area
- Year established: 2005
- Country: United States
- Part of: Minnesota
- Other regions in Minnesota: Upper Mississippi River Valley AVA
- Growing season: 148 days
- Climate region: Region Ib
- Heat units: 2438.5 GDD
- Precipitation (annual average): 23.65 in (601 mm) snow: 47.67 in (121.1 cm)
- Soil conditions: Nebish-Beltrami association, sand or sand and gravel outwash material
- Total area: 10,880 acres (17 sq mi)
- No. of vineyards: 1
- Grapes produced: Cabernet Franc, Cabernet Sauvignon, Chardonnay, Fox, Frontenac, Frontenac Gris, Itasca, La Crescent, Malbec, Marquette, Merlot, Petite Verdot, Shiraz, Traminette and Zinfandel
- No. of wineries: 1

Alexandria Lakes is Minnesota's initial American Viticultural Area (AVA) located in Douglas County, north of the city of Alexandria, and about 140 miles (230 km) northwest of Minneapolis on Interstate 94. It was established as the nation's 162nd wine appellation on July 1, 2005 by the Alcohol and Tobacco Tax and Trade Bureau (TTB), Treasury after reviewing the petition submitted by Robert G. Johnson, owner of Carlos Creek Winery, proposing a viticultural area named "Alexandria Lakes."

The appellation encompasses approximately 10,880 acres (17 sq mi) and is surrounded by six freshwater lakes and some of the deepest in the state. Lake Miltona, which is the largest lake in Douglas County, lies to the north. Lake Carlos, the largest lake in the Alexandria Lakes chain, according to the Alexandria Lakes Area Chamber of Commerce, lies to the east. Two small lakes, Lakes Louise and Alvin, and a medium-size lake, Lake Darling, are just south of the viticultural area boundary. Lake Ida, one of the largest lakes in the area, lies to the west. The plant hardiness zone range is 4a to 4b.

== History ==
Minnesota's hardy native wild grapes were staples of the indigenous inhabitants, Dakota and Ojibwa, who ate pemmican, a traditional food composed of dried meat, fat, and fruit. Later, European-Americans immigrants, after the American Civil War, produced hybrids crossing native grapes with domestic Vitis species from their homelands. University of Minnesota horticulturists bred grapes throughout the late 19th and early 20th centuries, releasing four hybrid varieties in 1944. Concurrently, Italian immigrants in northern Minnesota's Iron Range imported truckloads of grapes from California and produced wine in unlicensed, communal wineries. Minnesota's first winery license was issued shortly after the Repeal of Prohibition to the Old Sibley House Winery, which operated in West St. Paul until 1949 sourcing grapes from outside the state.
In 1997, only three wineries existed in Minnesota, and currently has grown to over 70 commercial wineries throughout Minnesota. Carlos Creek Winery is the sole winery with vintages whose labels bear the Alexandria Lakes appellation name.

== Terroir ==
=== Geography ===
Glacial activity, which occurred 10,000 years ago at the end of the last ice age, formed the Alexandria Lakes area. The Alexandria Lakes' geographical features further distinguish it from surrounding regions. The soil is unique, because the glacial activity gouged it from the surrounding areas. The steep glacial erosion produced a geographically isolated area that the region's deepest glacial lakes surround. These lakes are not only the deepest, but also, by volume, the largest in the region. Certain geographical features help define the viticultural area's borders.

=== Climate ===
The lakes around Alexandria Lakes AVA are very deep and have considerable surface area. The entire viticultural area receives the tempering "lake effect" from the surrounding bodies of water as it moderates the winter and summer temperature extremes, and delays budding of the vines beyond the late spring frosts. The lake effect generally moderates the local mesoclimate, bringing slightly warmer winters and cooler summers since large bodies of water retain heat and cold and react slower to temperature fluctuations. The number of frost-free growing days in this area ranges from 140 to 155 days, normally during the period of May 7 through October 3. The petitioner provided climate data for the years 1992 through 2001 from the University of Minnesota Meteorological Department's Web site. The data indicate that the Alexandria Lakes viticultural area averages less precipitation than the surrounding regions. The area's average precipitation is approximately 23.65 inches (601 mm) per year. By contrast, the city of Osakis, Wadena and Grant Counties, which are located east, north, and west of the area, respectively, all received between 1 to 3 more inches (25–76 mm) of precipitation per year. The petitioner states that the difference results from the seasonal southern winds that blow through the area and produce moisture updrafts that result in the formation of rain clouds generally north and east of the area.
The Alexandria Lakes viticultural area receives less annual snowfall than the surrounding regions, according to the petitioner. The area's average snowfall is 47.67 inches (121.1 cm) per year due to lake-effect. By contrast, Osakis, Wadena and Grant all receive between 4 to 8 more inches (10–20 cm) of snowfall per year. According to the petitioner, "the drier climate and lighter snow cover makes for lowered water tables, but watershed flowing from areas to the north and east replenish the water and maintain constant lake water levels." In addition, the petitioner states that the Alexandria Lakes viticultural area has temperature averages that are generally warmer in the winter and cooler in the summer than those of adjacent areas.

=== Soil ===
The soil is unique, because the glacial activity gouged it from the surrounding areas. The steep glacial erosion produced a geographically isolated area that the region's deepest glacial lakes surround. These lakes are not only the deepest, but also, by volume, the largest in the region. The petitioner states that the most abundant soils within the Alexandria Lakes viticultural area are of the Nebish-Beltrami association. This association is unique in that it makes up only 5 percent of the soils in Douglas County. The U.S. Department of Agriculture Soil Conservation Service (USDASCS) defines this soil as deep and well to moderately well drained. The petitioner states that vegetation in the area survives on poorer soils and has broader root systems than vegetation in surrounding regions. As evidence of this, the petitioner refers to the high concentration of hardwood trees in the Alexandria Lakes viticultural area. By contrast, the USDASCS defines the opposing lakeshores' soil, just west and north of the viticultural area, as belonging to the Waukon-Flom association, which they describe as poorly drained. The petitioner indicates that these are alluvial wash plains containing heavy lomis soils and low wetlands. The USDASCS defines the soil associations on the opposing shores just south and east of the Alexandria Lakes viticultural area as belonging to the Arvilla-Sverdrup association. These soils formed in sand or sand and gravel outwash material and are described as excessively drained.
