= Beta (grape) =

Variety of grape

- Grape (Vitis)
- Color of berry skin: blue-black
- Species: V. riparia, V. labrusca, V. vinifera (hybrid)
- Origin: Carver, Minnesota
- Notable regions: Minnesota, New York State, Finland
- Hazards: drought, heat
- Breeder: Louis Suelter
- Year of crossing: 1870
- Year of selection: 1881
- VIVC number: 1291

Beta is a North American grape hybrid with extreme cold-tolerance based on the riverbank grape (Vitis riparia). It is used for jellies, fruit juices, etc., and fresh eating, but rarely for wine.

The plant is productive and highly resistant to powdery mildew. It is among the most frost-hardy grape varieties known (down to USDA zone 3b). The large, green leaves are shallowly three-lobed. The flowers are self-fertile. It bears small dark, blue-black fruit that ripens very early (late September in New York State). The aromatic but quite sour (before frost) flesh has the characteristic woodland-strawberry note of its fox grape heritage.

== History ==
Since traditional fox grape-based cultivars had previously failed in Minnesota, German immigrant Louis P. Suelter of Carver, MN crossed one of them with the extremely cold-hardy wild riverbank grape. In 1870, he pollinated the popular labrusca-heavy Concord with pollen from a rare white-berried V. riparia selection called Carver, which is characterized by particularly early fruit ripening. His seedlings bloomed for the first time in 1881. He culled the mildew-prone plants and propagated the remaining four "Suelter’s Minnesota Hybrids": Along with the equally winter-hardy Suelter and the ‘Monitor’ and ‘Dakota’ cultivars, he also named Beta, after his wife. Because of this, the proper pronunciation is actually "Bett-uh", but the name is more commonly assumed to follow the pronunciation of the Greek letter. In 1884, Suelter began distributing cuttings of these varieties.

Its extreme frost hardiness made Beta an important parent variety for breeding. Beginning in 1908, M. J. Dorsey at the University of Minnesota systematically crossed it with various labruscana cultivars, resulting in the introduction of Bluebell, among others. The later selection Minnesota 78 (a cross with ‘Witt’) became an important foundation for Elmer Swenson’s breeding program, which was started in the 1940s. Its descendants include Trollhaugen, St. Pepin, La Crosse, Kay Gray, Edelweiss, Swenson Red, Brianna, and La Crescent. Swenson’s breeding program also utilized later varieties from the university’s program, which Wilcox continued in the 1940s.

Beta was widely planted in Minnesota in the early 20th century. By 1930, approximately 100 hectares were planted with it, and is still present in regional private gardens. It is also grown successfully in Finland. In northern China, it serves as a cold-tolerant rootstock. It is often compared to the newer, similar variety Valiant, which has an even slightly better winter hardiness.

== Literature ==
- J. J. Luby, 1991: Breeding Cold-hardy Fruit Crops in Minnesota
