= Nebraska wine =

Wine made from grapes grown in the U.S. state of Nebraska

Nebraska
- Wine region
- Nebraska's location in the United States
- Official name: State of Nebraska
- Type: U.S. state
- Year established: 1867
- Years of wine industry: 1870s – 1910s, 1994 – present
- Country: United States
- Total area: 77,421 sq mi (200,519 km^{2})
- No. of vineyards: 200
- Grapes produced: Catawba, Chambourcin, Chancellor, Chardonel, Concord, De Chaunac, Edelweiss, Frontenac, La Crosse, Marechal Foch, Norton, Seyval blanc, St. Croix, St. Pepin, St. Vincent, Swenson Red, Traminette, Valiant, Vignoles
- No. of wineries: 32 (28 in production)
- Wine produced: 103,000 gallons

Nebraska's oldest winery was founded in 1994, and about thirty-five commercial wineries operate across the state. Wine quality varies across the state, however several wineries have won Best of Show titles during the States first 25 years of commercial wine production. Five of those titles were won with wines made of the states #1 wine produced from the Variety Edelweiss. Other wins were made with a dry Brianna, Vignole and a Marechel Foch Rose' wine. The vast majority of these wineries are small and sell most of their wine to tourists who visit the winery in person. The University of Nebraska–Lincoln has a program in viticulture. There are no designated American Viticultural Areas in Nebraska.

== History ==
The wine and grape industry in Nebraska began in the late 19th century, by the end of which 5,000 acres (2,000 ha) of grapes were in production, with most vineyards located in the counties of southeastern Nebraska adjacent to the Missouri River. The Nebraska wine industry was devastated in the 1910s by Prohibition; after the repeal of Prohibition in 1933, the remaining commercial grape industry in Nebraska was destroyed by a storm in November 1940.

The wine and grape industry in Nebraska was dormant until the mid-1980s; the passage of the Nebraska Farm Wineries Act by the Nebraska Legislature in 1986 increased the amount of wine that a Nebraska winery could produce from 200 US gallons (760 L) to 50,000 US gallons (189,000 L). Even in the early 1990s, fewer than 10 acres (4 ha) of vineyards were in cultivation in the state.

The first winery in Nebraska since Prohibition, Cuthills Vineyard in Pierce, opened December 1994. Since then, 28 additional wineries have opened across the entire state.

== Grapes grown ==
Nebraska's climate, with its long, hot summers, cold winters, and wide seasonal variations in precipitation and humidity limits the ability to grow European grape varieties. Most Nebraska grapes are French-American hybrids and American varieties; varieties commonly grown include Edelweiss, La Crosse, Frontenac, St. Croix, and Vignoles. Petite Pearl is a new and promising red wine grape, which appears to do well in the Nebraska climate. One Nebraska winery produced a Petite Pearl wine recognized by Sommelier's Choice Awards as a red wine to consider.

Nebraska's grape growers continue to introduce and develop new varieties. In 2006, Whisky Run Creek Vineyard of Brownville produced the state's first Riesling. In the late 1990s, Cuthills Vineyards of Pierce began a breeding program to create European-style red wines by crossbreeding Spanish and French grapes with wild grapes native to Nebraska. The Temparia hybrid variety is the first grape derived from this breeding program to be used in a wine.

== Recognition ==
Nebraska wineries have gained national recognition for their wine. In 2012 Miletta Vista Winery won Best of Show with their Brianna at the US National Competition in Sonoma, CA. The same year they also won Best of Show with their Edelweiss wine in the Florida State Fair International Wine and Grape Juice Competition. They have continued to win numerous awards with Best of Class, Double Golds, and many others.

In 2006 Soaring Wing's "Dragons Red" was awarded the title of "best hybrid red" in the Best Of The East competition which pools wineries East of the Rockies. And since then they have garnered over 120 awards, including multiple Double Golds, in various national and international competitions.

== See also ==
- American wine
