= South Dakota wine =

South Dakota
- Wine region
- Official name: State of South Dakota
- Type: U.S. state
- Year established: 1889
- Country: United States
- Total area: 77,116 square miles (199,730 km^{2})
- Grapes produced: Brianna, De Chaunac, Edelweiss, Frontenac, Kay Gray, La Crosse, Marquette, Niagara, Seyval blanc, Valiant
- No. of wineries: 15

South Dakota wine refers to wine made from grapes grown in the U.S. state of South Dakota. Its region stretches between the latitudes of 42°N and 45°N sharing these latitudes with some of the most famous wine-producing areas in the world, including Bordeaux and Italy's Tuscany. South Dakota has a small wine industry, which must contend with extremes of heat in the summer and cold in the winter. The only grape species that naturally performs well in South Dakota is Vitis riparia, a species not generally used for wine production. The wineries in South Dakota have focused exclusively on cold-resistant French hybrid grapes. At present, there are no American Viticultural Areas (AVAs) in South Dakota, save for the state-level appellation.

== See also ==
- American wine
- List of breweries and wineries in South Dakota
