= Wyoming wine =

Wyoming
- Wine region
- Official name: State of Wyoming
- Type: U.S. state
- Year established: 1890
- Country: United States
- Total area: 97,818 square miles (253,347 km^{2})
- Size of planted vineyards: 30 acres (12 ha)
- No. of vineyards: 30 growers contribute to the Industry and vary in size and location.
- Grapes produced: Elvira, Frontenac, Valiant, Frontenac gris, LaCrosse, Marechal Foch, Marquette, LaCrescent, Seyval blanc

Wyoming wine refers to wine made from grapes grown in the U.S. state of Wyoming. There are no designated American Viticultural Areas in Wyoming. The state has three commercial wineries, Table Mountain Vineyards in Huntley, Wyoming Wine in Sheridan, and Unlocked Vines in Mills. Table Mountain Vineyards is Wyoming's largest with a 10-acre (40,000 m^{2}) vineyard and produced 3,000 gallons in 2007 from 100% Wyoming grapes. The winery helped pave the way for the Wyoming Grape and Wine Association (WGWA) which focuses on expanding and developing the Wyoming grape industry. Table Mountain Vineyards has paired up with several wineries in western Nebraska to promote wineries along the historic emigration trails, including the Oregon Trail.

Unlocked Vines creates small batch wine, while Wyoming made the "cowboy way". They grow cold vine hardy hybrid grapes built for the state's winters and blend them with premium varietals creating unique wines.

== See also ==
- American wine
