= Daniel Vineyards =

Family-owned estate winery

Coordinates: 37.740288°N 81.254524°W

- Location: Crab Orchard, West Virginia
- Distribution: West Virginia
- Tasting: Tuesday thru Saturday
- Website: www.danielvineyards.com

The Daniel Vineyards is a family-owned estate winery located in Crab Orchard, West Virginia. The vineyard was created in 1990 at the former location of the 192-acre (78 ha) Twin Oaks Golf Course by Doctor C. Richard Daniel, a retired radiologist. About 20 acres (8.1 ha) are used for vineyards, with an additional acreage for blackberries and 3 acres (1.2 ha) for blueberries. Visitors are allowed to pick their own blueberries when in season.

The vineyard is over 2,500 feet (760 m) above sea level, so cultivars were chosen that thrive in a cold climate. These cultivars are disease resistant and use a special trellis, the "Vertical Shoot Positioning V-shaped system", developed by Dr. Daniel. By 2007 Daniel Vineyards was West Virginia's largest winery. It has hosted the West Virginia Spring Wine Festival each year since 1999. In 2008 the West Virginia Department of Conservation rated the vineyard as the third best conservation farm in West Virginia, due in part to features such as deer training fences and vegetation around the vineyard such as Canadian hemlock, Lombardy poplar, and roses. Special events such as birthdays and weddings are held at the vineyard.

== Varieties of grapes ==
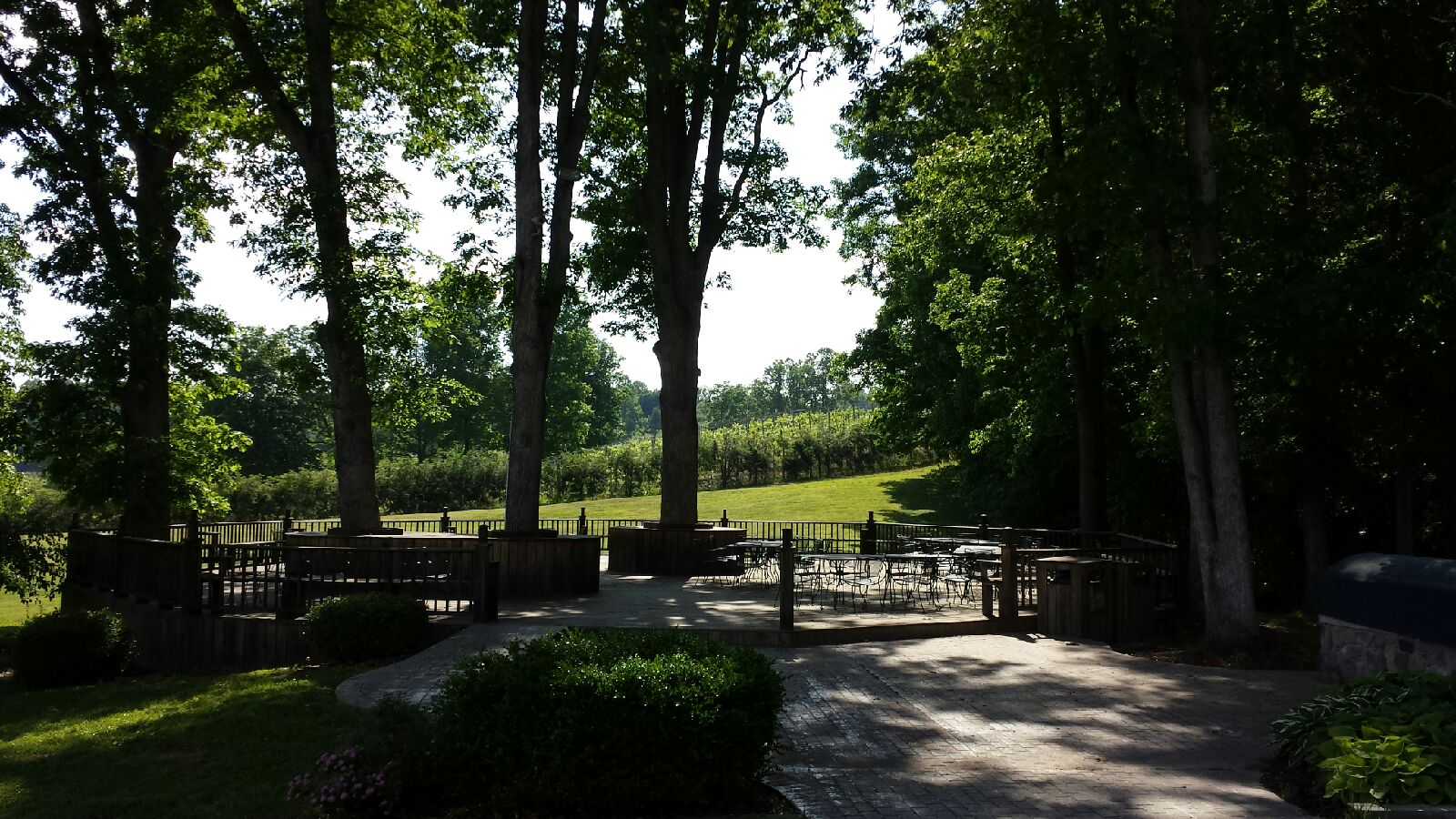
Tree deck and vineyards at Daniel Vineyards

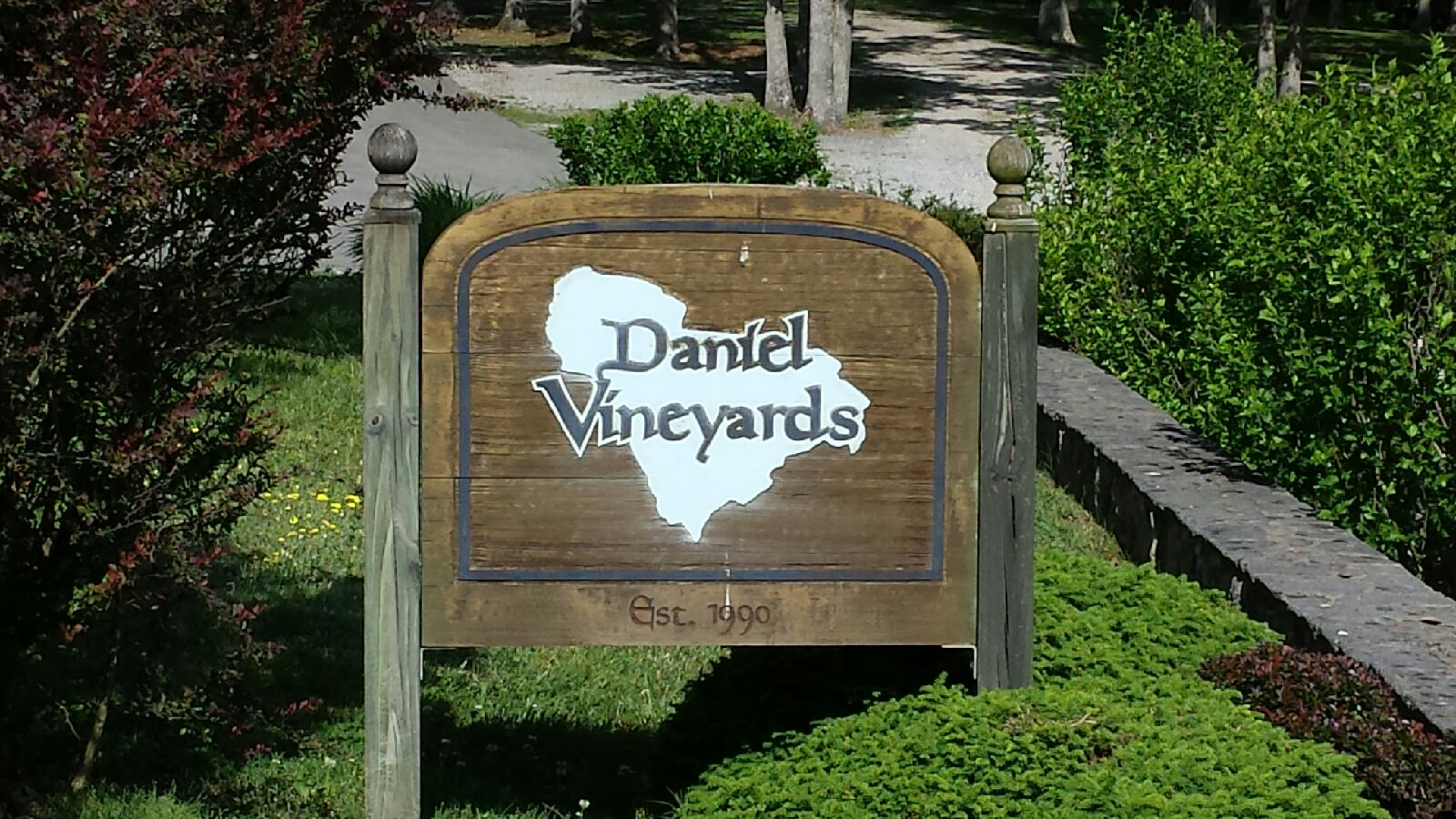
Sign at entrance to Daniel Vineyards

Dr. Daniel has grown 116 varieties of grapes since founding the vineyard, 14 of which are in production as of 2013:

- Cornell University Hybrids (Cayuga White, Chardonel, Traminette)
- French-American Hybrids (Seyval blanc, St. Vincent, Vidal blanc, and Vignoles)
- Native American (Norton)
- Swenson Hybrids (Brianna, Esprit, and Sabrevois)
- University of Minnesota Hybrids (Frontenac, La Crescent, and Marquette)

Red wines include Baco noir, Blackberry, Frontenac, Marquette, Norton, Port, Pink, Sabrevois, St. Croix, and St. Vincent. White wines include Brianna, Cayuga, Chardonel, Esprit, La Crescent, Seyval, Traminette, Vidal Blanc, and Vignoles. The best selling wine is the blackberry wine, which is made from all blackberries and no grapes. It has won two bronze medals, two silver medals, and one gold medal.
