= Loess Hills District AVA =

American Viticultural Area in western Iowa and northwestern Missouri

Coordinates: 41.4627°N 95.5854°W

Loess Hills District
- Wine region
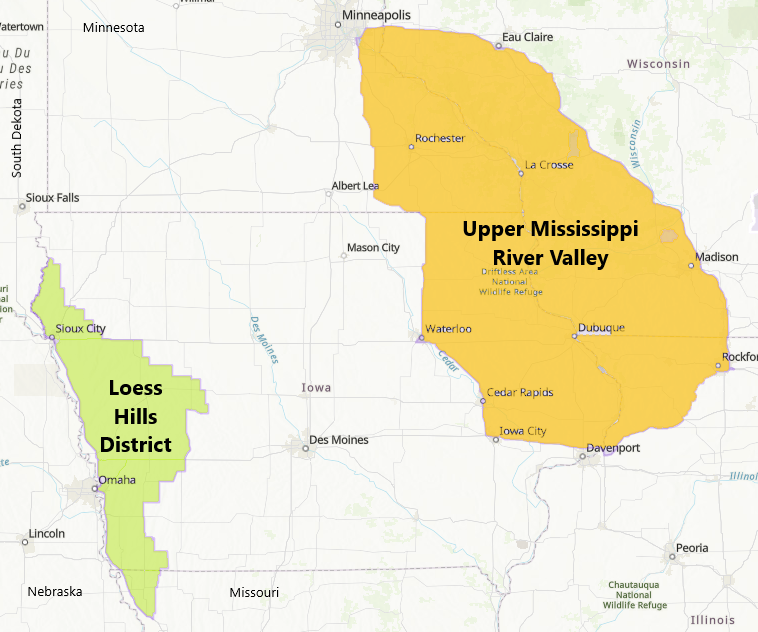
- Type: American Viticultural Area
- Year established: 2016
- Country: United States
- Part of: Iowa, Missouri
- Other regions in Iowa, Missouri: Upper Mississippi Valley AVA
- Climate region: Region III
- Heat units: 3,239 GDD units
- Precipitation (annual average): 31.95 in (811.53 mm)
- Soil conditions: Deep glacial loess (up to 300 feet (91 m))
- Total area: 8.25 million acres (12,897 sq mi)
- Size of planted vineyards: 112 acres (45 ha)
- No. of vineyards: 66
- Varietals produced: Chambourcin, Noiret and Norton
- No. of wineries: 13

Loess Hills District is an American Viticultural Area (AVA) located in western Iowa and northwestern Missouri. It was established as the nation's 234^{th}, Missouri's fifth and Iowa's second wine appellation on March 3, 2016 by the Alcohol and Tobacco Tax and Trade Bureau (TTB), Treasury after reviewing the petition submitted by Shirley Frederiksen, on behalf of the Western Iowa Grape Growers Association and the Golden Hills Resource Conservation and Development organization proposing the viticultural area named "Loess Hills District." The 8.25-million-acre (12,897 sq mi) district is a long, narrow north–south orientated swath of land along the Big Sioux and Missouri Rivers from Hawarden, Iowa to Craig, Missouri. At the outset, there were approximately sixty-six commercially-producing vineyards covering a total of 112 acres (45 ha) distributed throughout the AVA sourcing 13 wineries. Loess Hills District is not a sub-region within any established AVA.

== Terroir ==
Loess Hills District is located in a region characterized by extremely deep layers of wind-deposited soil called "loess." The loose, crumbly soil composed of quartz, feldspar, mica, and other materials as grounded into a fine powder by glaciers during the Ice Ages. These soils reach as deep as 300 feet (91 m) in places. When the glaciers melted, the water pushed this "glacial flour" down the Missouri River Valley. As the waters receded, the exposed dried silt was dispersed by the prevailing westerly winds and deposited across the landscape over broad areas that over time have formed the hills. The main benefit of the deep, friable soils is they offer little impediment to root systems where vines can grow deep into the ground in search of nutrients. The soils also drain easily, which is advantageous given the district's high levels of rainfall. Erosion can be an issue in Loess Hills, although, over the years, hillsides were carved out making suitable pockets for wine-growing. These hillside vineyard sites prevent cool air from pooling above the vines, reducing the risk of frost. Summers are hot and humid with a majority of the annual precipitation concentrated in the warmer months. In contrast, it is not unusual to see vineyards blanketed in snow throughout the winter period. The USDA plant hardiness zones range from 5a to 6a.

== Wine industry ==
Many vineyards and wineries are clustered around the border city of Omaha, Nebraska which provides a steady stream of visitors to the area. The climate here is continental. Therefore, successful viticulture depends on a range of different mesoclimates throughout the area that require a favorable altitude, slope and aspect of the vineyard.
