= Rosette (grape) =

Variety of grape

- Grape (Vitis)
- Color of berry skin: Red
- Also called: Seibel 1000
- VIVC number: 10209

Rosette or Seibel 1000 is a wine hybrid grape red-berries variety which originated with the work of French physician and viticulturist Albert Seibel by a crossing of Jaeger 70 with Vitis vinifera. Rosette is also the common ancestor of St. Pepin and La Crosse grapes. Rosette is used to produce rosé wine.

== See also ==
- Seibel grapes
