= Frost grape =

Frost grape is a common name which may refer to any of the following species of grapevine:

- Vitis riparia, native to North America
- Vitis vulpina, native to North America
