= List of breweries and wineries in South Dakota =

South Dakota was one of 14 U.S. states that forbade small breweries from directly distributing beer products. Small breweries were required to use a distributor under South Dakota law. In 2018, South Dakota Law was changed to allow micro breweries to self-distribute.

== Breweries ==
=== Current Breweries ===
- XIX Brewing Company - Vermillion
- 12 Mile Creek Brewing Company - Parkston
- A Homestead Brew - Valley Springs
- Altered Species Ales - Sioux Falls
- Armour Brewing Company - Armour
- Ben's Brewing Company - Yankton
- Big Lost Meadery & Brewery - Sioux Falls
- Buffalo Ridge Brewing - Hartford
- Choteau Creek Brewing Company - Wagner
- Cohort Craft Brewery - Rapid City
- Covert Artisan Ales & Cellars - Sioux Falls
- Crow Peak Brewing Company - Spearfish
- Dakota Point Brewing - Rapid City
- Dakota Shivers Brewing - Lead
- Dempsey's Brewery, Pub, and Restaurant - Watertown
- Eponymous Brewing Company - Brookings
- Fernson Brewing Company - Sioux Falls
- Firehouse Brewing Company - Rapid City
- Granite City Food & Brewery - Sioux Falls
- Hairy Cow Brewing Company - Box Elder
- Hay Camp Brewing Company - Rapid City
- Jacob's Brewhouse and Grocer - Deadwood
- Jefferson Beer Supply - Jefferson
- Look's Beer Company - Sioux Falls
- Lost Cabin Beer Company - Rapid City
- Mt Rushmore Brewing Company - Custer
- One Legged Pheasant - Aberdeen
- Palace City Brewing Company - Mitchell
- Platte Creek Brewing Company- Geddes
- Remedy Brewing Company - Sioux Falls
- Sawyer Brewing - Spearfish
- Severance Brewing Company - Sioux Falls
- Sick N Twisted Brewery - Hill City
- Spearfish Brewing Company - Spearfish
- Sturgis Brewing Company - Sturgis
- Watertown Brewing Company - Watertown
- Wooden Legs Brewing Company - Brookings
- WoodGrain Brewing Company - Sioux Falls
- Woodland Republic Brewing and Blending- Rapid City
- Zymurcracy Beer Company - Rapid City

=== Former Breweries ===
- Backspace Brewing Company - Yankton
- Berger Brewing (Never brewed) - Sioux Falls
- Bitter Esters Brewhouse - Custer
- Borderline Butchering & Brewery - Brandon
- Dakota Territory Brewing Company - Aberdeen
- Gandy Dancer Brew Works - Sioux Falls
- Heist Brewing Company - Brookings
- Hydra Beer Company - Sioux Falls
- Jailhouse Taps - Lead
- Jekyll & Hyde Brewed Potions (precursor to Severance) - Sioux Falls
- The Knuckle (precursor to Sturgis Brewing) - Sturgis
- Last Mile Brewery - Rapid City
- Lean Horse Productions (never brewed, Beer brewed by Crow Peak) - Spearfish
- Lupulin Brewing - Sioux Falls
- Miner Brewing Company - Hill City
- Obscure Brewing - Sioux Falls
- Piney 44 - Rapid City
- Sioux Falls Brewing Company - Sioux Falls
- Six Degrees Brewing Company (precursor to Zymurcracy) - Rapid City

=== Historical Breweries ===
- Black Hills Brewing Company
- Sioux Falls Brewing & Malt Company

== Wineries ==
- Baumberger Vineyard and Winery - Dell Rapids
- Calico Skies Vineyard & Winery - Inwood, Iowa (near SD border)
- Chateau Sylvania Vineyard and Winery - Toronto
- ChrisaMari Winery - Pierre
- Dakota Falls Winery - Brandon
- Firehouse Wine Cellars - Rapid City
- Naughti Wines - Custer
- Prairie Berry Winery - Hill City
- Schade' Vineyard and Winery - Volga
- Schade' Winery - Deadwood
- Strawbale Winery - Renner
- Tucker's Walk Vineyard - Garretson
- Valiant Vineyards Winery - Vermillion

== See also ==
- Beer in the United States
- List of breweries in the United States
- List of microbreweries
- South Dakota wine
