= Corot noir =

Hybrid grape variety for use in red wine production

Corot noir is a hybrid grape variety for use in red-wine production. It was developed by grape breeder Bruce Reisch at the Cornell University New York State Agricultural Experiment Station and released on July 7, 2006.

Corot noir is the result of a cross between hybrids Seyve Villard 18-307 and Steuben in 1970. It ripens mid-season to late-season, and according to grape breeder Bruce Reisch, its wines "are free of the hybrid aromas typical of many other red hybrid grapes, and can be used for varietal wine production or for blending. The distinctive red wine has a deep red color and attractive berry and cherry fruit aromas".
