= Lake Charley =

Lake in the state of Minnesota, United States

- Location within Minnesota
- Location: Douglas County, Minnesota
- Coordinates: 45°56′44″N 95°24′23″W
- Type: lake

Lake Charley is a lake in Douglas County, in the U.S. state of Minnesota.

Lake Charley was named for the son of a pioneer settler; Lake Louise was named after the pioneer's daughter.

== See also ==
- List of lakes in Minnesota
