= Valvin muscat =

Variety of grape

Valvin muscat is a hybrid grape variety for use in white wine production. It was developed by grape breeder Bruce Reisch at the Cornell University New York State Agricultural Experiment Station and released on July 7, 2006.

Valvin muscat is the result of a cross between Muscat Ottonel (vitis vinifera) and hybrid Muscat du Moulin (Couderc 299–35). It has distinct muscat grape characteristics, in that they are more winter hardy and disease resistant than the former.
