= Hybrid grape =

Variety of grape

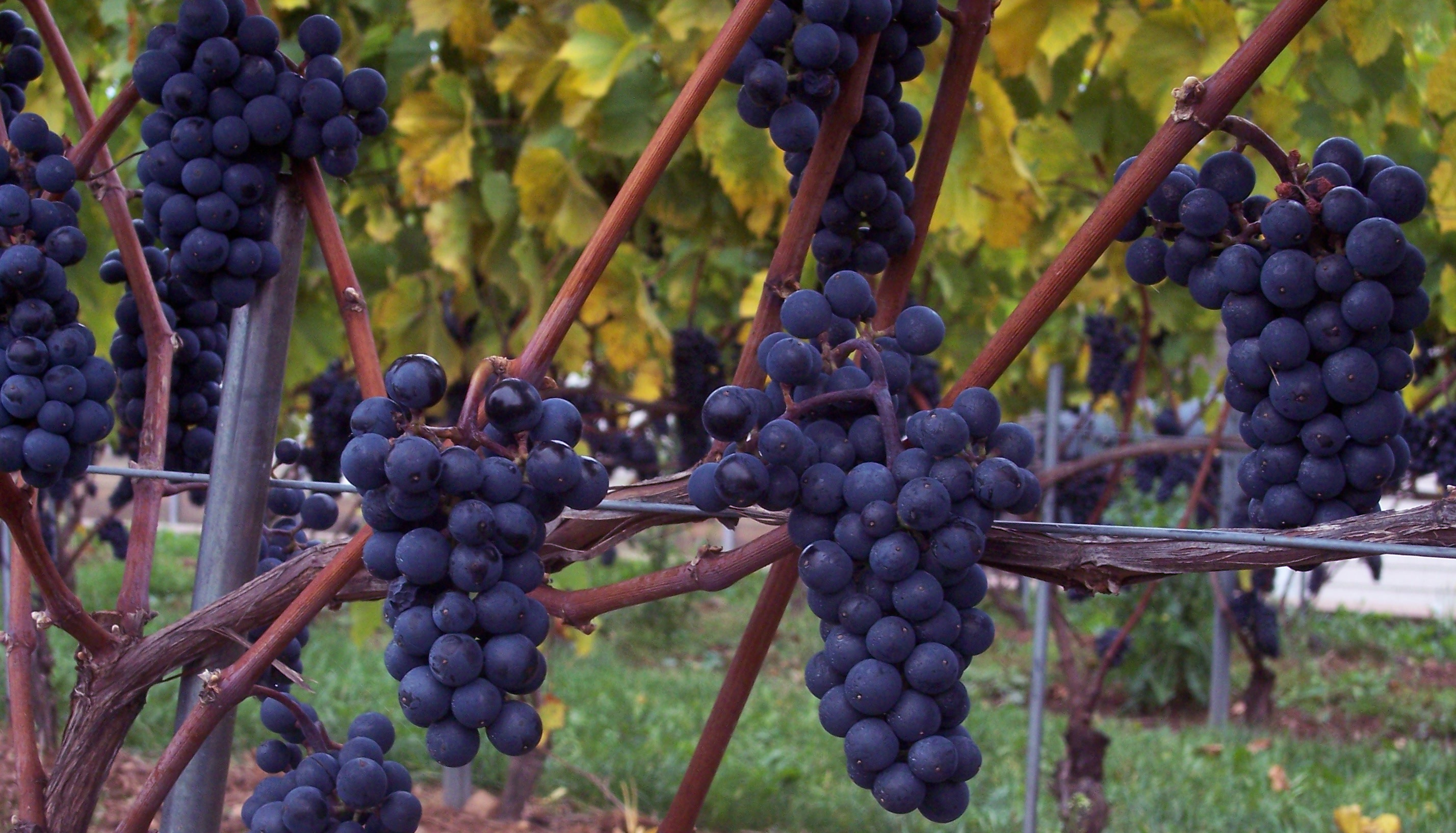
The hybrid grape variety Marechal Foch.

Hybrid grapes are grape varieties that are the product of a crossing of two or more Vitis species. This is in contrast to crossings between grape varieties of the same species, typically Vitis vinifera, the European grapevine. Hybrid grapes are also referred to as inter-species crossings or "Modern Varieties." Due to their often excellent tolerance to powdery mildew, other fungal diseases, nematodes, and phylloxera, hybrid varieties have, to some extent, become a renewed focus for European breeding programs. The recently developed varieties (Rondo and Regent) are examples of newer hybrid grape varieties for European viticulturalists. Several North American breeding programs, such as those at Cornell and the University of Minnesota, focus exclusively on hybrid grapes, with active and successful programs, having created hundreds if not thousands of new varieties.

Hybrid varieties exhibit a mix of traits from their European, Asiatic, and North American parentage. Those varieties which derive from Vitis labrusca parentage (such as those still used in the production of Austrian Uhudler) can have a strong "candied" or "wild strawberry" aroma depending many factors, while those that derive from Vitis riparia often have a herbaceous nose with flavours reminiscent of black currants. However, modern hybrid varieties often contain multiple species in their parentage and are inter-crossed many times, so some distinctive flavors and aromas disappear or evolve into new, unique expressions due to their combination with others. Institutional and private breeders continually develop new hybrids around the world, so it is difficult to generalize about "hybrid traits," and many of the old stereotypical descriptions are outdated and apply only to some of the older hybrids.

== History ==
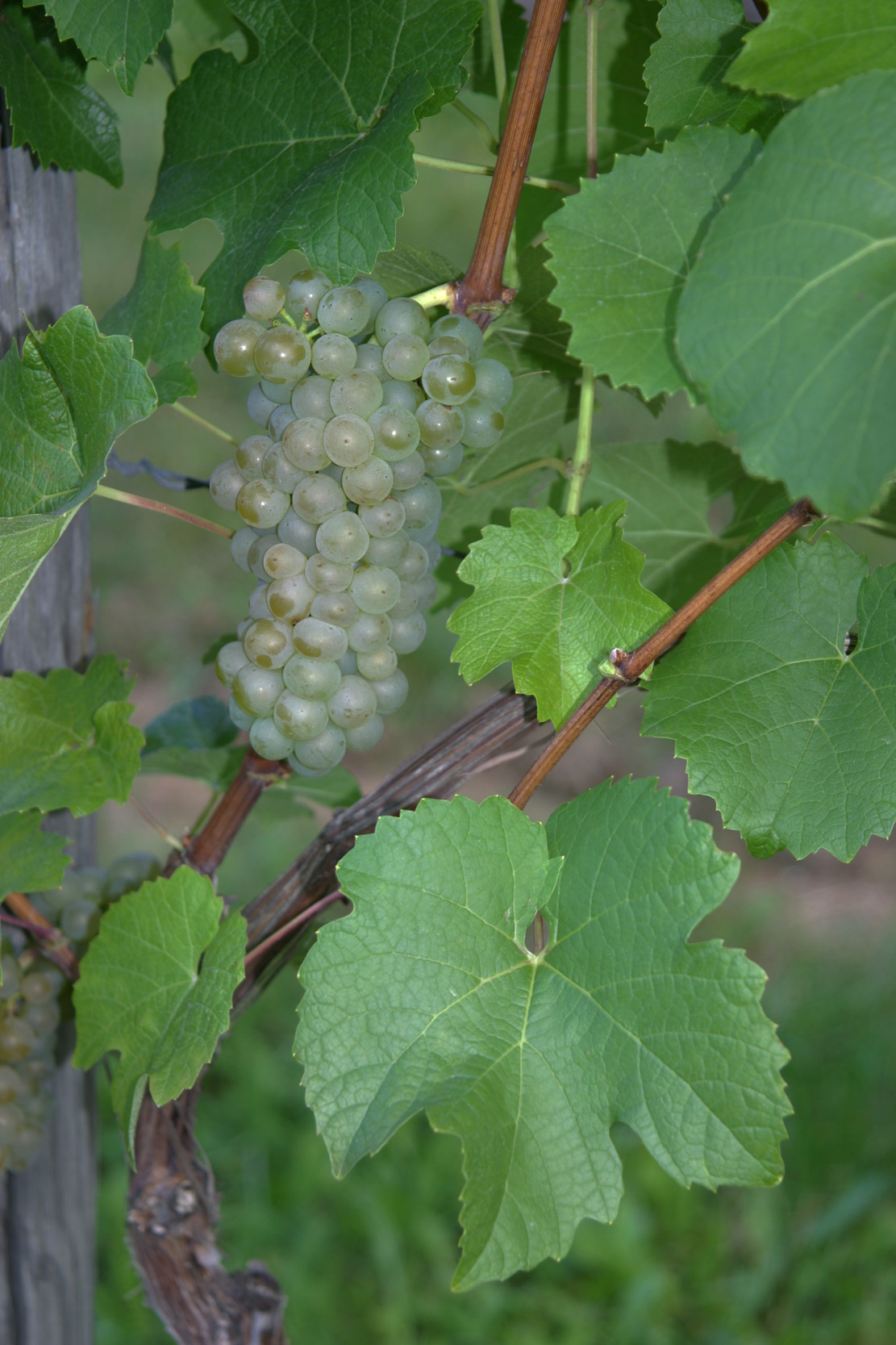
The hybrid grape Merzling created by a crossing Seyve-Villard 5276 with a cross Riesling × Pinot gris.

During the first half of the 20th century, various breeding programs were developed in an attempt to deal with the consequences of globalization, which resulted in Europeans and European-Americans bringing the Phylloxera louse from North America to Europe, as well as several North American parasitic fungi - like black rot (Guignardia bidwellii), downy mildew (Peronospora), and powdery mildew (Erysiphe necator). Phylloxera devastated European vineyards throughout the late 1800s. While many hybrids were able to successfully resist Phylloxera, as well as the novel fungal pressures, European producers chose to graft their susceptible traditional, single-species European varieties onto North American resistant rootstock.

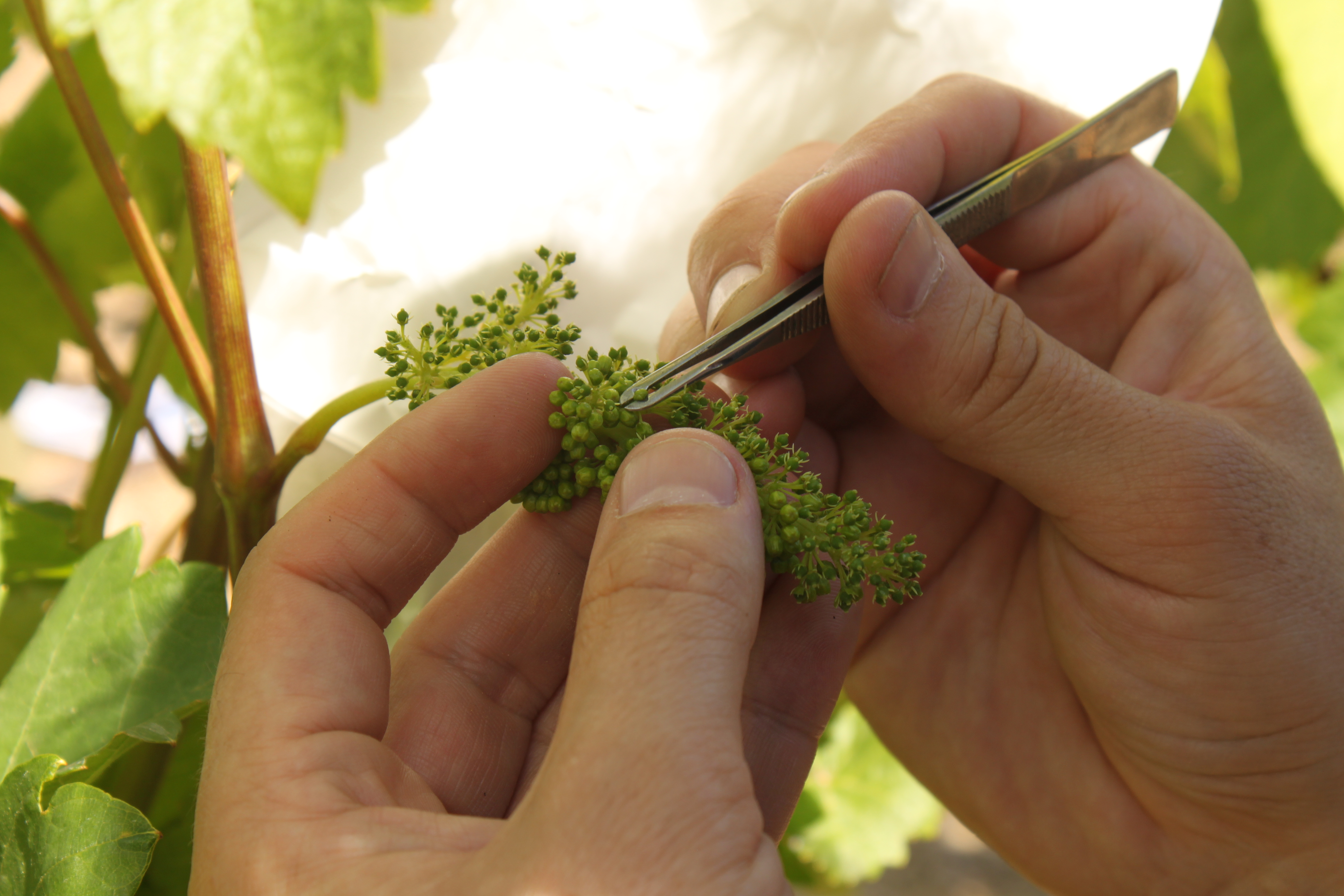
Example of a breeder castrating all flowers of a grapevine cluster.

However, hybrid grape varieties were introduced as a solution to many of the viticulture problems of shorter-season, cooler and more humid wine regions, such as those in the northeast and Pacific Northwest of North America, as well as to many other temperate, sub-tropical, and tropical climates in South America and Asia, such as in Columbia, Brazil, India, and China. From the 1950s onwards, grape varieties such as De Chaunac, Baco noir, Marechal Foch, Vidal, etc. have been a staple of the wine industries in Ontario, New York, Pennsylvania, etc. Only since the 1970s and 1980s have vinifera varieties begun to displace hybrid grapes in this area. Even in those areas where Vitis vinifera now predominates, hybrid varieties still have "cult following" with some wine consumers. Furthermore, in some cases hybrid grapes are used to produce unique and exceptional products; for example, ice wine produced from Vidal blanc or Vignoles in Ontario and New York.

The most planted grape in the world by area, Kyoho, is a hybrid, and the most planted grape in Brazil is a hybrid (Isabella). Hybrid grapes are expanding in traditional vinifera wine regions as well, because they can be easier to grow and can ripen earlier than vinifera (which reduces bird predation and reduces the risk of fruit hanging into the Fall rains), and because they typically have much more disease resistance (thereby requiring less spraying, which lessens tractor fuel usage and the volume of spray applications). Therefore, hybrid grapes are considered a "Green" (ecologically sustainable) alternative to vinifera grapes.

== Grapevine species ==
The Vitis aestivalis hybrid grape Norton.

The best-known grape species in reference to viticulture include:

- Vitis vinifera, the so-called European or wine grape, indigenous in the Eurasian area. Classed within this species are the best-known table and wine grape varieties such as Riesling, Chardonnay, Cabernet Sauvignon, Pinot noir, Merlot and Gamay.
- Vitis aestivalis, native to eastern North America.
- Vitis rupestris, native to North America.
- Vitis riparia (also sometimes known as Vitis vulpina), the "river bank grape", native to northeastern North America.
- Vitis amurensis, the Asiatic grape species, native to Siberia and China.
- Vitis rotundifolia, the muscadines, native to the southern half of the United States
- Vitis labrusca, native to northeastern North America. Concord and Niagara are both interspecific hybrids with a large labrusca content.

While rare, interspecific hybrid vines can result in the wild from cross-pollination. Due to the abundance of American Vitis species one finds such natural hybrid vines on the American continent. The majority of the well-known hybrid vines however, have been artificially created. The earliest named hybrid in America was the Alexander grape, discovered around 1740 near a vineyard planted for William Penn along the Schuylkill.

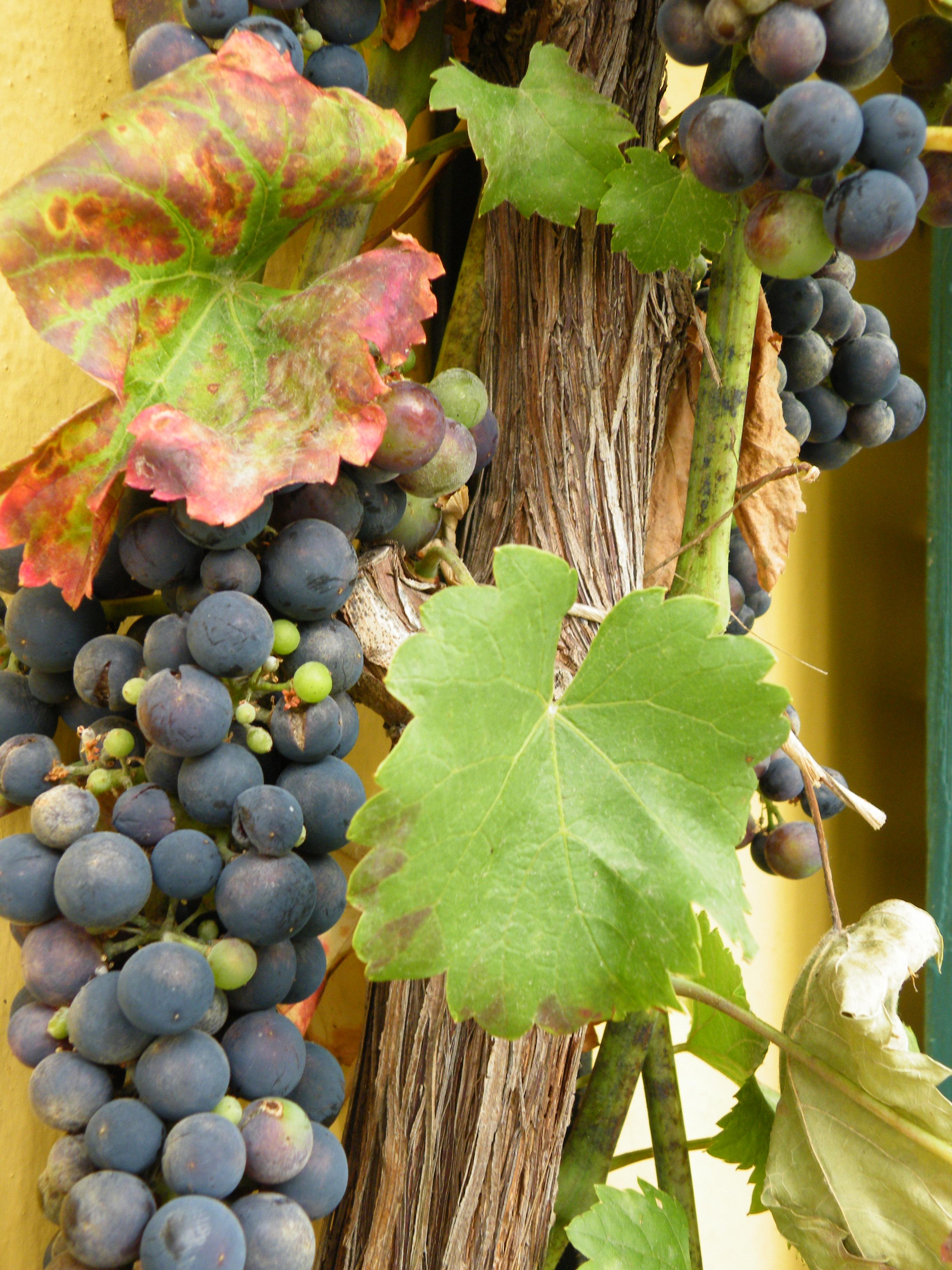
The Regent grape produced by a crossing of Diana and Chambourcin.

== See also ==
- Propagation of grapevines

Breeders

- Valentin Blattner: propagator of Cabernet blanc and creator of several other varieties
- T.V. Munson: often cited as the savior of European viticulture and the father of rootstock breeding, released dozens of cultivars and contributed greatly to the knowledge of wild American grape species.
- Albert Seibel: Probably the best-known breeder, who developed an immense number of breeding between 1886 and 1936 in Aubenas. The well-known Seibel grapes include De Chaunac, Chelois, Chancellor, Cascade, Rosette, Rougeon and Aurore.
- Joannes Seyve: Son of Bertille, grandson of Villard and creator of Chambourcin
- Elmer Swenson, of Wisconsin, breeder of St. Croix, St. Pepin, La Crosse, Esprit, Edelweiss, Swenson Red, and Kay Gray among others.

A few Hybrid grape varieties

- Baco noir, hybrid variety created by Francois Baco
- Corot noir, Noiret and Valvin muscat, varieties created by Bruce Reisch from Cornell University's New York State Agricultural Experiment Station
- Frontenac, Marquette and La Crescent, developed at the University of Minnesota.
- Marechal Foch and Leon Millot, varieties created by Eugene Kuhlmann
- Regent, hybrid variety created by Gerhardt Alleweldt at the Geilweilerhof Institute for Grape Breeding
- Seyval blanc and Villard blanc, varieties created by Bertille Seyve and Victor Villard
- Vignoles (Ravat 51), hybrid grape created by J.F. Ravat
- Vidal blanc, hybrid white grape created by Jean Louis Vidal
