= Crab Orchard, West Virginia =

- Census-designated place (CDP)
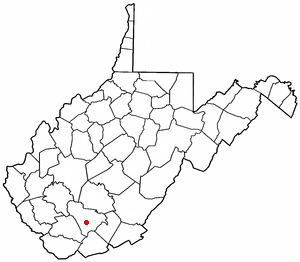
- Location of Crab Orchard, West Virginia
- Coordinates: 37°44′50″N 81°14′30″W
- Country: United States
- State: West Virginia
- County: Raleigh

Area
  - Total: 2.2 sq mi (5.8 km^{2})
  - Land: 2.2 sq mi (5.8 km^{2})
  - Water: 0 sq mi (0.0 km^{2})
- Elevation: 2,287 ft (697 m)

Population (2020)
  - Total: 2,416
  - Density: 1,100/sq mi (420/km^{2})
- Time zone: UTC-5 (Eastern (EST))
  - Summer (DST): UTC-4 (EDT)
- ZIP code: 25827
- Area code: 304
- FIPS code: 54-18508
- GNIS feature ID: 2389365

Crab Orchard is a census-designated place (CDP) in Raleigh County, West Virginia, United States. The population was 2,416 at the 2020 census.

== Geography ==
According to the United States Census Bureau, the CDP has a total area of 2.2 square miles (5.8 km^{2}), all land.

== Demographics ==
Historical population
Census	Pop.	Note	%±
2000	2,761		—
2010	2,678		−3.0%
2020	2,416		−9.8%
U.S. Decennial Census

As of the census of 2000, there were 2,761 people, 1,120 households, and 807 families living in the CDP. The population density was 1,217.2 people per square mile (469.6/km^{2}). There were 1,219 housing units at an average density of 537.4/sq mi (207.3/km^{2}). The racial makeup of the CDP was 98.19% White, 0.91% African American, 0.07% Native American, 0.11% Asian, 0.04% Pacific Islander, 0.18% from other races, and 0.51% from two or more races. Hispanic or Latino of any race were 0.62% of the population.

There were 1,120 households, out of which 31.7% had children under the age of 18 living with them, 57.1% were married couples living together, 11.2% had a female householder with no husband present, and 27.9% were non-families. 24.5% of all households were made up of individuals, and 11.3% had someone living alone who was 65 years of age or older. The average household size was 2.47 and the average family size was 2.92.

In the CDP, the population was spread out, with 23.1% under the age of 18, 9.4% from 18 to 24, 29.0% from 25 to 44, 24.6% from 45 to 64, and 13.9% who were 65 years of age or older. The median age was 37 years. For every 100 females, there were 90.0 males. For every 100 females age 18 and over, there were 88.3 males.

The median income for a household in the CDP was $29,932, and the median income for a family was $35,172. Males had a median income of $30,455 versus $19,574 for females. The per capita income for the CDP was $22,021. About 9.7% of families and 13.2% of the population were below the poverty line, including 24.2% of those under age 18 and 11.5% of those age 65 or over.

== History ==
Crab Orchard is famous, historically, as the town in which Senator Robert Byrd organized a chapter for the Ku Klux Klan. After Byrd had collected the $10 joining fee and $3 charge for a robe and hood from every applicant, the Grand Dragon Joel L. Baskin for the mid-Atlantic states came down to Crab Orchard, to officially organize the chapter... "When it came time to choose the Exalted Cyclops, the top officer in the local Klan unit, Byrd won unanimously."

Crab Orchard was named for the many crab apple trees near the original town site.

== Agriculture ==
In 1990 the Daniel Vineyards and winery was created from a former golf course location.
