= Lake Darling (Minnesota) =

Lake in the state of Minnesota, United States

- Location within Minnesota
- Location: Douglas County, Minnesota
- Coordinates: 45°55′7″N 95°23′46″W
- Type: lake
- Surface area: 1,050 acres (420 ha)
- Max. depth: 62 feet (19 m)
- Shore length^{1}: 6.8 miles (10.9 km)
- References: https://www.dnr.state.mn.us/lakefind/lake.html?id=21008000
- ^{1} Shore length is not a well-defined measure.

Lake Darling is a lake in Douglas County, in the U.S. state of Minnesota. The lake is home to black bullhead, black crappie, bluegill, bowfin, and many more species of fish.

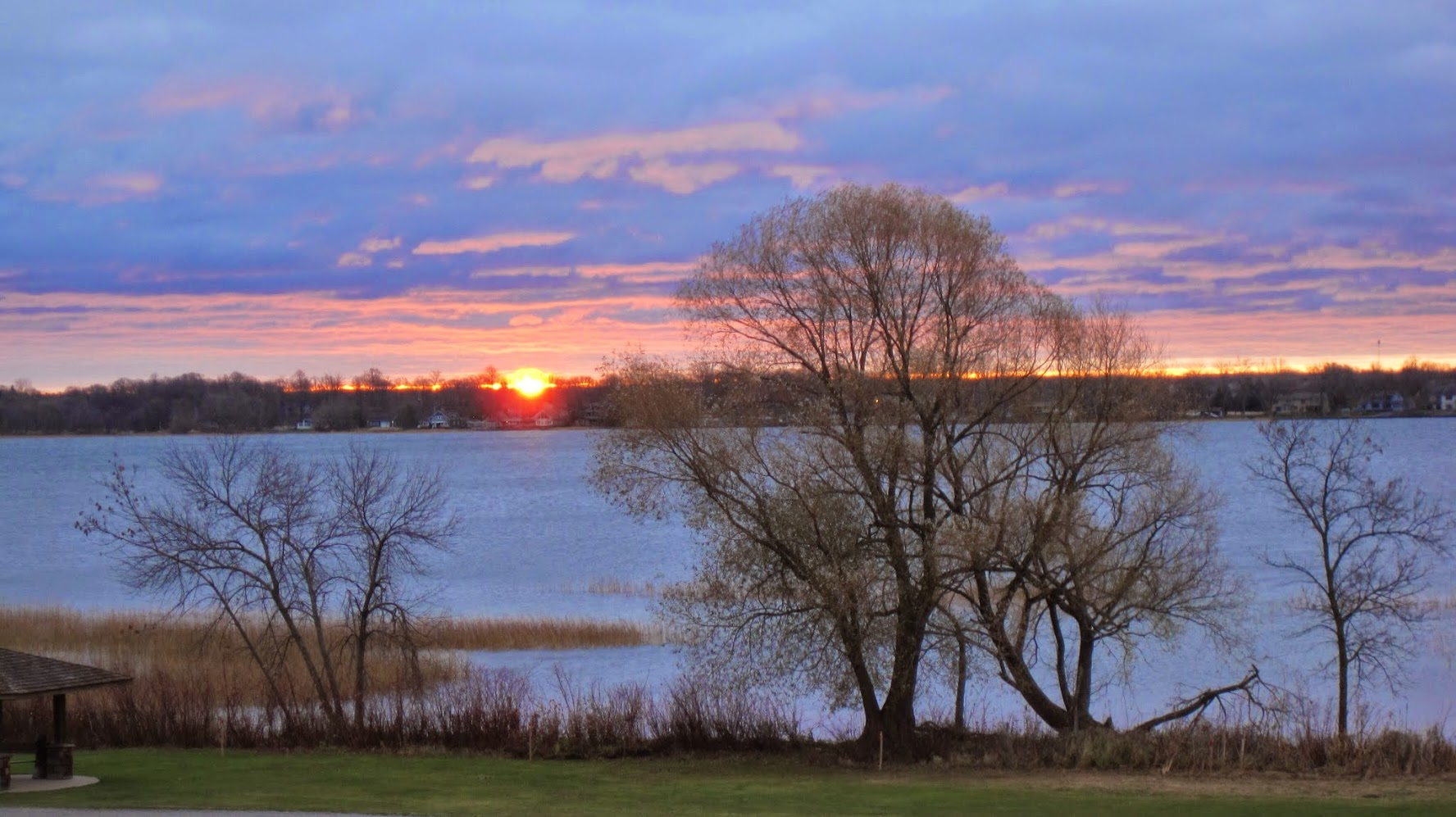
Lake Darling

Lake Darling was named for Andrew Darling, who settled there in 1860.

== See also ==
- List of lakes in Minnesota
