= Valiant (grape) =

American grape variety

Valiant (South Dakota 72S15) is a dark grape variety with extreme cold hardiness from the United States. Due to the pronounced aroma, the berries are mainly used for processing into jellies, jams and juice. The wine is frequently used as a blending component or, more rarely, sold as a light, fresh rosé wine.

Valiant is a hybrid grape variety with genes from Vitis labrusca, Vitis riparia, and Vitis vinifera. Ron M. Peterson developed it in 1967 at the South Dakota Agricultural Experiment Station of South Dakota State University in Brookings. He crossed the labrusca-heavy Fredonia and the experimental South Dakota 62-8-58. The latter is a seedling of Vitis riparia that was found at Culbertson, Montana. Valiant was selected in 1972, got approved for experimental cultivation in 1982, and has been approved for commercial cultivation since 1997. Due to its extreme winter hardiness, the grape variety is grown in the U.S. states of Minnesota, Iowa, South Dakota, North Dakota, Wyoming, Michigan, and Missouri. In 2016, the recorded vineyard area totaled 11 hectares.

It is often compared to the older variety Beta, whose winter hardiness it slightly surpasses.

== Characteristics ==
The grape variety is very vigorous and productive. It is susceptible to powdery mildew, downy mildew, and black rot. Valiant is extremely hardy. In Manitoba, it withstood temperatures as low as −45.5 °C. The small, blue-black berries ripen early in very small, densely packed clusters. They have juicy flesh with pronounced foxiness.
