= St. Pepin (grape) =

Variety of grape

St. Pepin is a modern hybrid variety of wine grape, mostly grown in North America. It produces grapes suitable for making fruity white wines similar to Riesling or as a base for blended wines. The grapes also make a good seeded table grape for eating. It has the benefits of early ripening and when hardened properly in the fall it is winter hardy to at least −25 °F (−32 °C). As such, it best suited to growing in more northern climates.

St. Pepin was bred by Elmer Swenson c. 1970 and released in 1986. It is a hybrid of the male Seyval blanc crossed to a seedling of Minnesota 78 by Seibel 1000 (a.k.a. Rosette). Unlike most modern grapes, it is a pistillate female and so needs to be planted next to male vines from a close sibling variety to achieve pollination.

== Parentage ==
To clarify the parentage of St. Pepin;

- Minnesota 78 is recorded as a cross of Beta by Witt, but many have doubted this pedigree, and Elmer Swenson suggested that the male parent may be Jessica, a cross of Vitis labrusca by a variety of Vitis aestivalis.
- Beta is a cross of a variety of Vitis riparia by Concord.
- Seyval is a cross of Seibel 5656 and Seibel 4986. Both these hybrids are a complex set of crosses of other Seibel hybrids.

== See also ==
- List of grape varieties
