= Lake Louise (Douglas County, Minnesota) =

Lake in the state of Minnesota, United States

- Location within Minnesota
- Location: Douglas County, Minnesota
- Coordinates: 45°55′45″N 95°25′8″W
- Type: lake
- Surface area: 214.46 acres (86.79 ha)
- Average depth: 18 feet (5.5 m)
- Max. depth: 33 feet (10 m)
- Shore length^{1}: 2.16 miles (3.48 km)
- References: https://www.dnr.state.mn.us/lakefind/lake.html?id=21009400
- ^{1} Shore length is not a well-defined measure.

Lake Louise is a lake in Douglas County, in the U.S. state of Minnesota. Prominent fish species in the lake include Black Bullhead, Black Crappie, Bowfin, and more.

Lake Louise was named for the daughter of a pioneer who named another nearby lake for his son: Lake Charley.

== See also ==
- List of lakes in Minnesota
