= Kay Gray =

Variety of grape

Kay Gray is a hybrid grape variety, developed by the Wisconsin grape breeder Elmer Swenson c. 1980 and named after a family friend. It is a seedling of Swenson's own ES 217 (a cross of Minnesota 78 and Golden Muscat). Swenson collected open-pollinated seeds from this vine, and one seedling eventually became Kay Gray. Because of this, the male parent is unknown, though Swenson suspected it might be a nearby vine of Onaka, an old South Dakota cultivar. Kay Gray itself is female and requires a pollen source in order to set fruit.

In some environments it can produce an odd flavored wine that is vastly improved by modest levels of blending. Had it not been for its exceptional disease resistance and winter hardiness it probably would not have been selected. In subsequent years Swenson used this grape as a parent for the more conventionally flavored cultivars 'Louise Swenson' and 'Brianna'.
