= Swenson Red =

Variety of grape

The Swenson Red is a firm, meaty red table grape with a unique fruity flavor with strawberry notes. This was the first grape released from the breeding efforts of Elmer Swenson, and is a favorite among grape breeders and hobbyists. Though it is known as a red, its actual color changes depending on climate. In cooler areas it will be blue, and in very warm areas it will be a translucent green. This is because many pigments inherited from Vitis vinifera only set during relatively cool weather.

Swenson Red is one of many successful cold-hardy grape crosses involving the parent Minnesota 78. The pollinator parent for the cross is Seibel 11803 (Rubiland). Swenson Red has a female sibling named ES417 which has very similar characteristics and is a likely candidate for further breeding.
