= La Crescent (grape) =

Variety of grape

- Grape (Vitis)
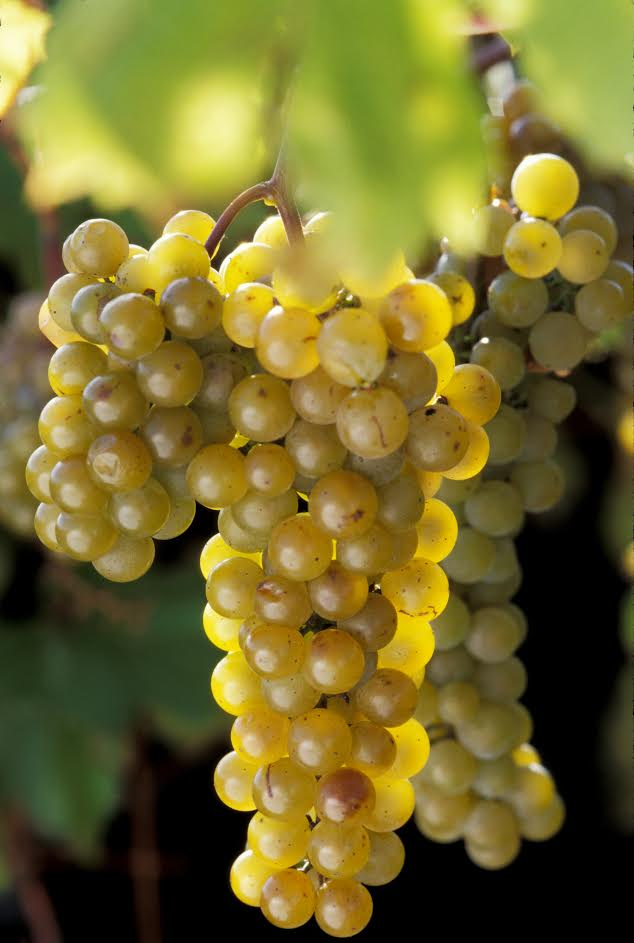
- Color of berry skin: Blanc
- Species: Vitis vinifera
- Also called: MINNESOTA 1166
- Origin: University of Minnesota
- Pedigree parent 1: St. Pepin × Elmer Swenson 6-8-25
- Notable regions: United States
- VIVC number: 17632

La Crescent is a white grape variety developed by the University of Minnesota's cold hardy grape breeding program. Since its release to the market in 2002 La Crescent has been planted with success in Iowa, Kansas, Minnesota, Missouri, Montana, Nebraska, New Hampshire, New York, Ohio, Oregon, Vermont, British Columbia, and Wisconsin. Per the licensing application the variety is cold-hardy to −36 °F (−38 °C) and per the patent application wines produced will feature desirable aromas of citrus, apricot, pineapple, and muscat (as found in Riesling or Vignoles varieties) and lacks ‘foxy’ aromas associated with V. labrusca and herbaceous aromas associated with V. riparia.

== History ==
La Crescent was invented by University of Minnesota researchers James Luby and Peter Hemstad. The Regents of the University of Minnesota was awarded US Patent 14,617 in 2004. Those wishing to propagate La Crescent must obtain a license from the U. of MN

== See also ==
- Frontenac (grape), another hybrid from the University of Minnesota
