= La Crosse (grape) =

Variety of grape

La Crosse is a modern hybrid cultivar of wine grape, mostly grown in North America. It produces grapes suitable for making fruity white wines similar to Riesling or as a base for blended wines. The grapes also make a good seeded table grape for eating. It has the benefits of early ripening and when hardened properly in the fall it is winter hardy to at least -25°F. As such it is best suited to growing in more northern climates and can be found grown in small regions of Ohio.

== History ==
Lacrosse was produced and patented by American grape breeder Elmer Swenson around 1970. It is a hybrid of Seyval crossed to a cross of Minnesota 78 by Seibel 1000 (a.k.a. Rosette). To clarify the parentage of Lacrosse:

Minnesota 78 is recorded as a cross of Beta by Witt, however many have disputed this pedigree based its characteristics, and Elmer Swenson speculated that the pollen parent was likely Jessica, which was used in many crosses. Beta is a cross of a selection of the wild grape Vitis riparia, Carver, by Concord. Jessica is a cross of a selection of Vitis labrusca by Vitis aestivalis. Seyval is a cross of Seibel 5656 and Seibel S4986. Both these hybrids are a complex set of crosses of other Seibel hybrids.

Spelling variants in use by wineries and vendors of the hybrid include La Crosse, LaCrosse and Lacrosse. The Lacrosse spelling is preferred by viticulturists. The registry the U.S. Code of Federal Regulations registry for LABELING AND ADVERTISING OF WINE , however, lists only "LaCrosse."
