= Minnesota 78 =

Variety of grape

Minnesota 78 is a variety of grapevine, developed at the University of Minnesota. It was extensively used in breeding by Elmer Swenson, with its Vitis riparia background providing a degree of adaptation to the harsh climate of the upper Midwest.

It has been recorded as a cross of Beta by Witt. However, many have doubted this pedigree, and Swenson suggested that the male parent may be Jessica, a cross of Vitis labrusca by a variety of Vitis aestivalis. Because Witt appears to have been lost, precluding genetic testing, the truth may not be known.
