= Elmer Swenson =

American grape breeder (1913–2004)

- Born: December 12, 1913
- Died: December 24, 2004 (aged 91)
- Occupation: Viticulturist

Elmer P. Swenson (12 December 1913 – 24 December 2004) was an American pioneering grape breeder who introduced a number of new cultivars, effectively revolutionizing grape growing in the Upper Midwest of the United States and other cold and short-seasoned regions.

== Biography ==
Elmer Swenson worked on a 120-acre (0.49 km^{2}) farm near Osceola, Wisconsin which he had inherited from his maternal grandfather Larson, an immigrant from Norway. Swenson began breeding grapes in 1943, starting a program of intercrossing French hybrid grapes with selections of the local wild species, Vitis riparia. He was inspired by the work of T. V. Munson, a Texas breeder who had documented the American grape species and heavily utilized them in his breeding. Swenson hoped to generate seedlings capable of producing high quality fruit in his climate, something few if any cultivars could do reliably at that time.

For ten years beginning in 1969, Swenson took a job caring for fruit crops at the University of Minnesota, and he began to conduct some of his work there, although the bulk of his breeding program remained at his own farm. His first two hybrids, 'Edelweiss' and 'Swenson Red', were joint releases with the University of Minnesota, but further cultivars were independently released.

Swenson always maintained a very liberal policy of sharing breeding selections, sending cuttings to just about anyone who asked. Five of his hybrids were patented, but many more were freely distributed, and many cultivars were even named by other people, which has resulted in a degree of confusion.

== Cultivars developed ==
Patented cultivars:

- St. Croix
- St. Theresa
- St. Pepin
- La Crosse
- Espirit
- Kay Gray

Co-released with University of Minnesota:

- Swenson Red
- Edelweiss
- Minnesota 78

Others:

- Kandiyohi
- Sabrevois
- Norway Red
- Alpenglow
- Petit Jewel
- Prairie Star
- Louise Swenson
- Lorelei
- Trollhaugen
- Swenson White
- Summersweet
- Brianna
- Delisle
- Montreal Blue (aka. 'St. Theresa' and 'Flambeau')
- Aldemina
- Somerset Seedless
- Laura's Laughter
- Osceola Muscat aka. Muscat de Swenson
