= St. Croix (grape) =

Wine grape variety

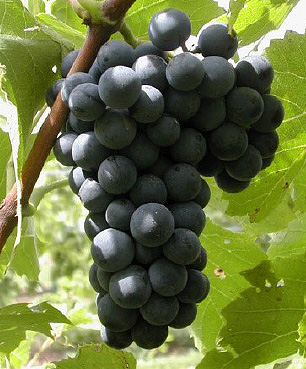
Saint Croix

Saint Croix is a wine grape variety developed in 1981 by American grape breeder Elmer Swenson of Osceola, Wisconsin. It goes by the synonyms Saint Croy, E.S. 2-3-21, and Elmer Swenson 242. It is a cross of V. labrusca x V. riparia grapes with cultivar crosses [E.S. 283 (Minn. 78 x Seibel 1000) x E.S. 193 (Minn. 78 x ‘Seneca’)].
