= Edelweiss (grape) =

Variety of grape

Edelweiss is a very winter-hardy wine grape variety, pale green in color, derived from crossing the Minnesota 78 and Ontario grapes. It was developed by American grape breeder Elmer Swenson in 1978 in cooperation with the University of Minnesota. The clusters are large and rather loose, weighing a pound or more. Early picking of the grape is essential for making a wine. Should Edelweiss not be harvested early, the completely ripe Vitis labrusca flavoring becomes too strong for the palate of most. Edelweiss was first developed as a table grape. This variety bears the Minnesota winters, but mulching is encouraged. During this process be wary when tying the shoots together because they break easily. Edelweiss has strong resistance to grape disease and fungus and can tolerate negative thirty-five degree temperatures.

Nebraska's premiere grape is Edelweiss. The wineries in the state have won numerous awards nationwide with their Edelweiss wines.
