= Marquette (grape) =

Variety of grape

- Grape (Vitis)
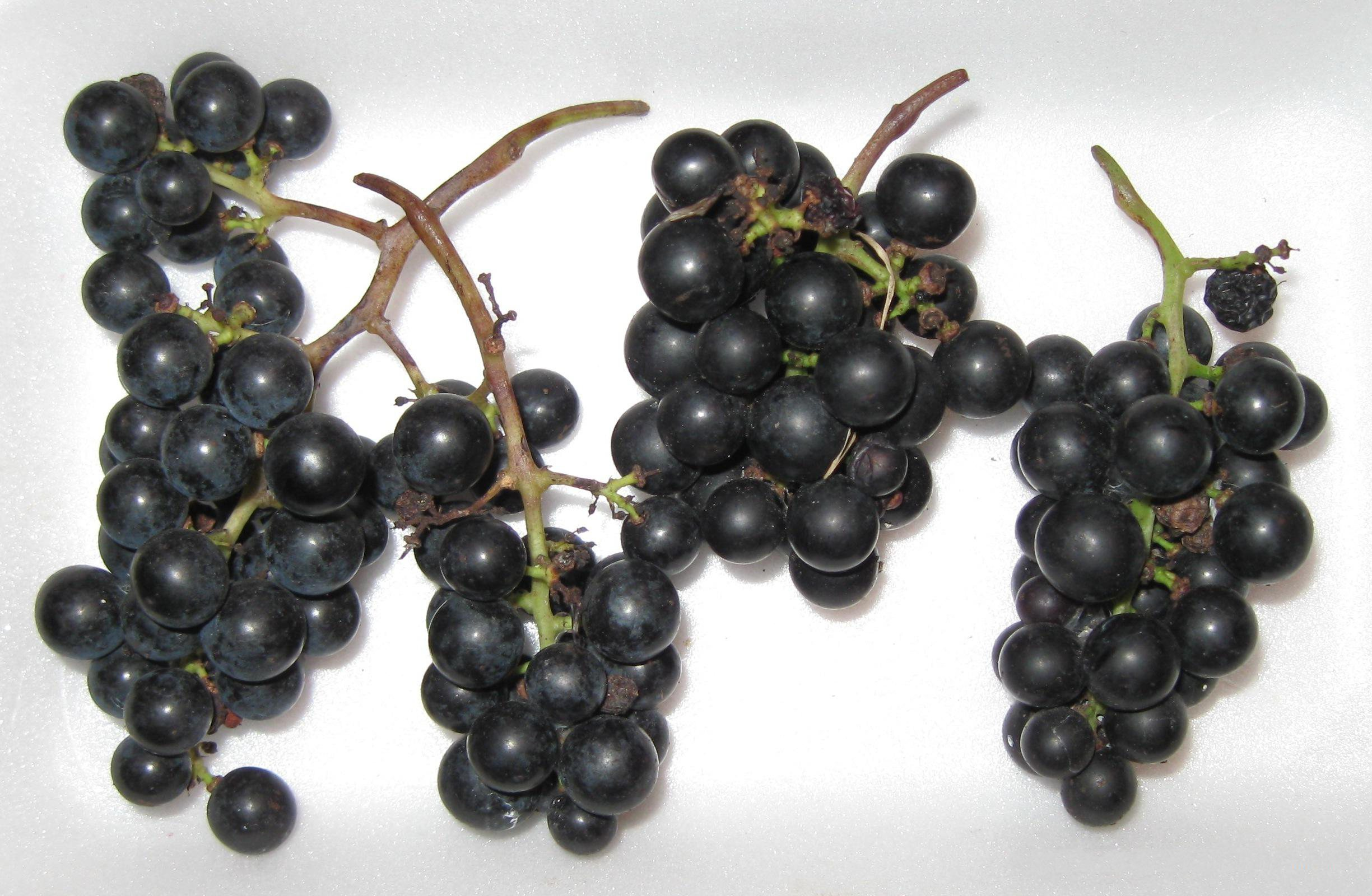
- Marquette grapes
- Color of berry skin: Noir
- Species: Interspecies crossing with Vitis vinifera and Vitis riparia, amongst others, in its pedigree
- Also called: Minnesota 1211
- VIVC number: 22714

Marquette is an inter-species hybrid red wine grape variety. It was developed at the University of Minnesota as part of its grape-breeding program (which seeks to develop high quality, cold hardy, and disease-resistant wine and table grape cultivars), and is a cross between two other hybrids, MN 1094 and Ravat 262. Marquette was introduced in 2006 and has good resistance to downy mildew, powdery mildew, and black rot, as well as being cold hardy (will survive -37 C when fully dormant).

In August 2019, VQA Ontario announced that the province of Ontario's VQA (Vintners Quality Alliance) regulations have added Marquette to the list of permitted grape varieties for Ontario wines branded as VQA. In 2021, the Government of British Columbia amended their regulations to include the grape (which is grown in the Thompson Valley, BC region) as a BC VQA permitted grape.

== Synonyms ==
Marquette is also known under its breeding code Minnesota 1211 (MN 1211).

== See also ==
- Frontenac (grape), another hybrid from the University of Minnesota
