= Frontenac (grape) =

Variety of grape

- Grape (Vitis)
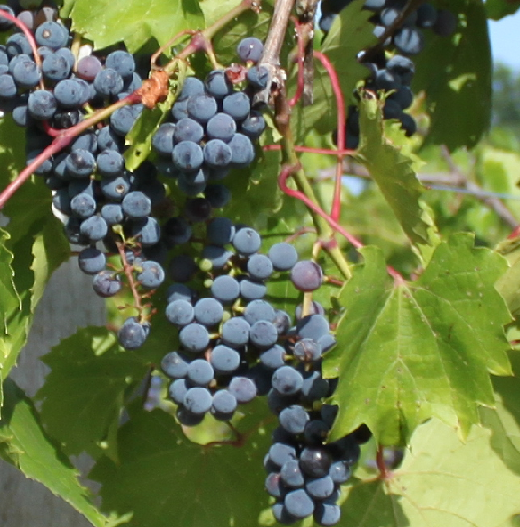
- Frontenac grapes on the vine.
- Color of berry skin: Noir
- Species: 50% Vitis riparia × 50% Landot noir
- Origin: University of Minnesota
- Notable regions: United States, Canada
- VIVC number: 15904

Frontenac (French pronunciation: [fʁɔ̃tnak]) is an interspecific hybrid grapevine that is a result of research and crossbreeding by the University of Minnesota. It was grown from a crossing of the complex interspecific hybrid Landot 4511 and a very cold-hardy selection of Vitis riparia. It was released in 1996.

Frontenac gris is a white wine version of Frontenac, introduced in 2003. It started as a single bud mutation of Frontenac, yielding gray (thus named gris) fruit and amber-colored juice. Frontenac blanc was introduced in 2012 from white fruited mutations found in both Frontenac and Frontenac gris vines in Minnesota and Canada.

== Vine and viticulture ==
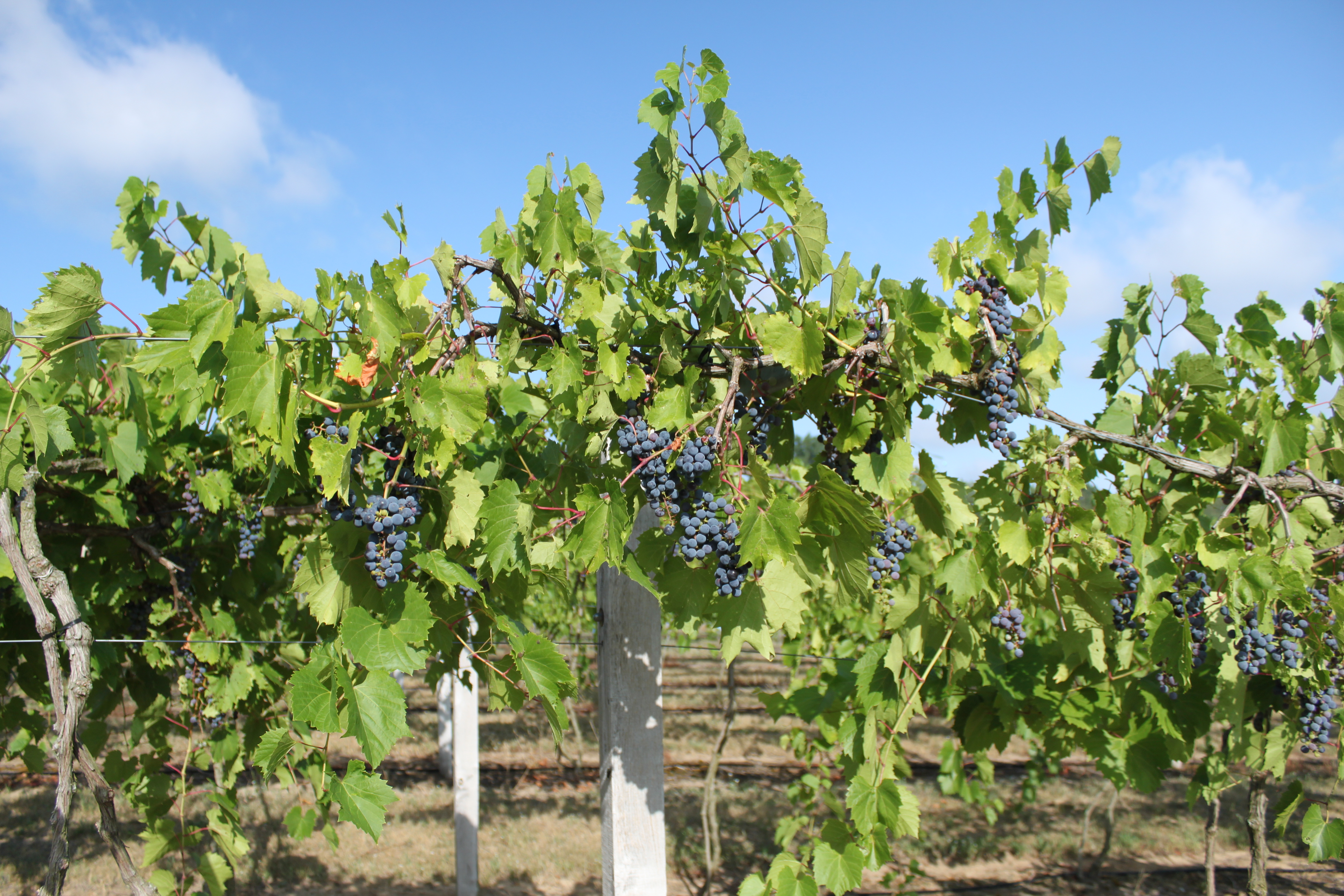
Frontenac grapes growing in Michigan.

The vines produce loose clusters of dark, highly acidic, high sugar berries. Frontenac is quite vigorous, cold hardy down to −35 °F (−37 °C), highly resistant to downy mildew, and resistant to powdery mildew and botrytis. Frontenac grapes are much smaller than traditional grapes, grow in tight clusters and produce a mild grape flavor.

== Wine characteristics ==
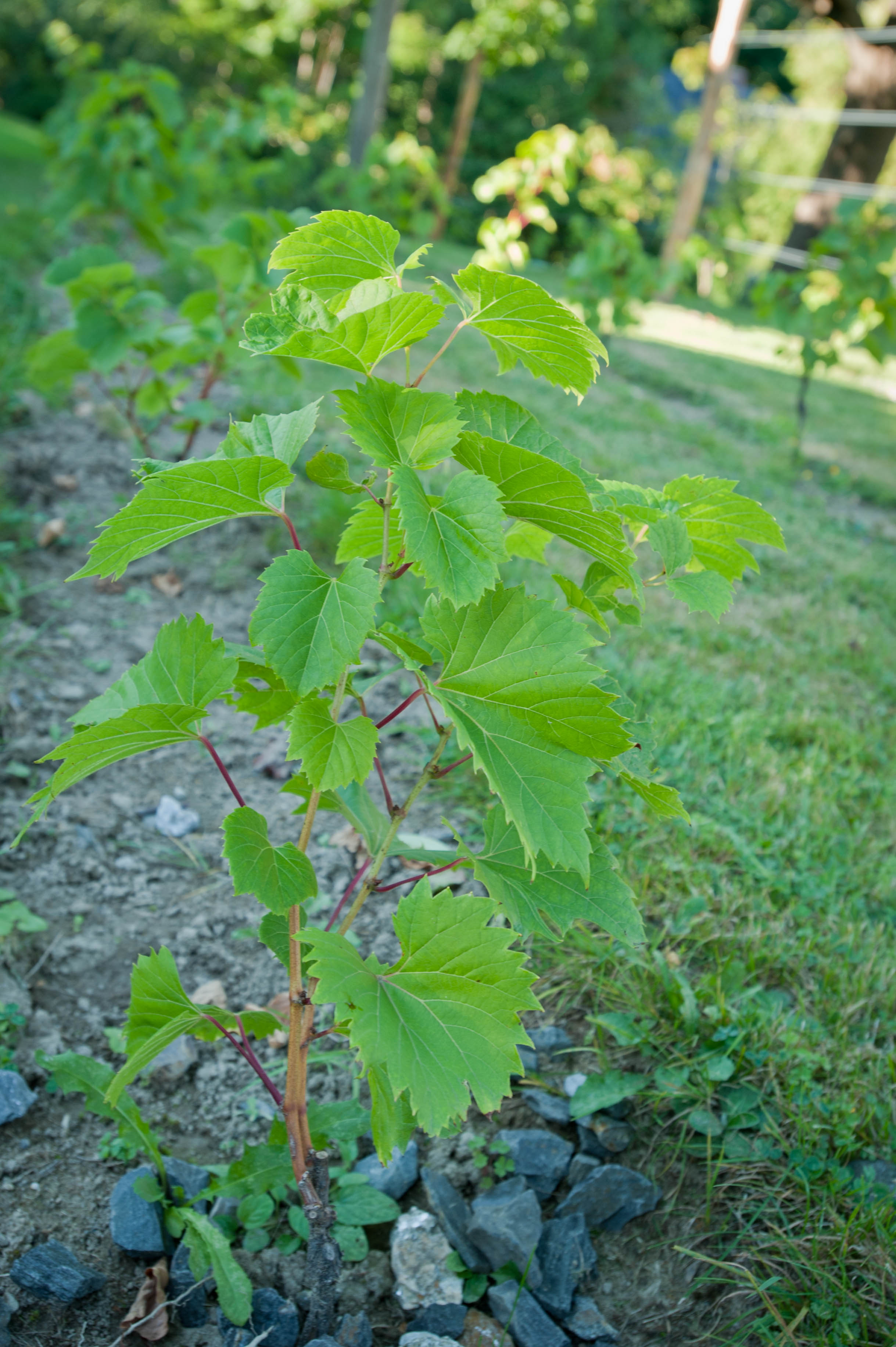
A young Frontenac gris grapevine.

Frontenac has been used for the production of dry red wines, rose, as well as for fortified wine in the style of port. The wines produced from Frontenac typically present aromas of cherry and other red fruits.

While producing a pleasing wine, the ripeness of the grapes is difficult to judge from sugar levels alone, and wine-makers are often challenged by its high acidity and atypical pH levels.

Frontenac gris wines present aromas of peach and apricot with hints of enticing citrus and tropical fruit. A brilliant balance of fruit and acidity creates lively, refreshing wines. Unique and complex flavors make this an excellent grape for table, dessert, and ice wines.

Initial trial vinifications of Frontenac blanc indicate that it produces wines that are distinctly different from Frontenac gris in flavor and aroma. The University of Minnesota plans to evaluate and characterize Frontenac blanc lines as they are made available.

== Regional production ==
Although the grape has a very short history, its promise as a wine grape for very cold regions has led to many plantings across the northeastern part of the United States and Canada. The variety is one of the 4 most commonly planted wine grapes in Minnesota, with Frontenac gris, La Crescent, and Marquette.
