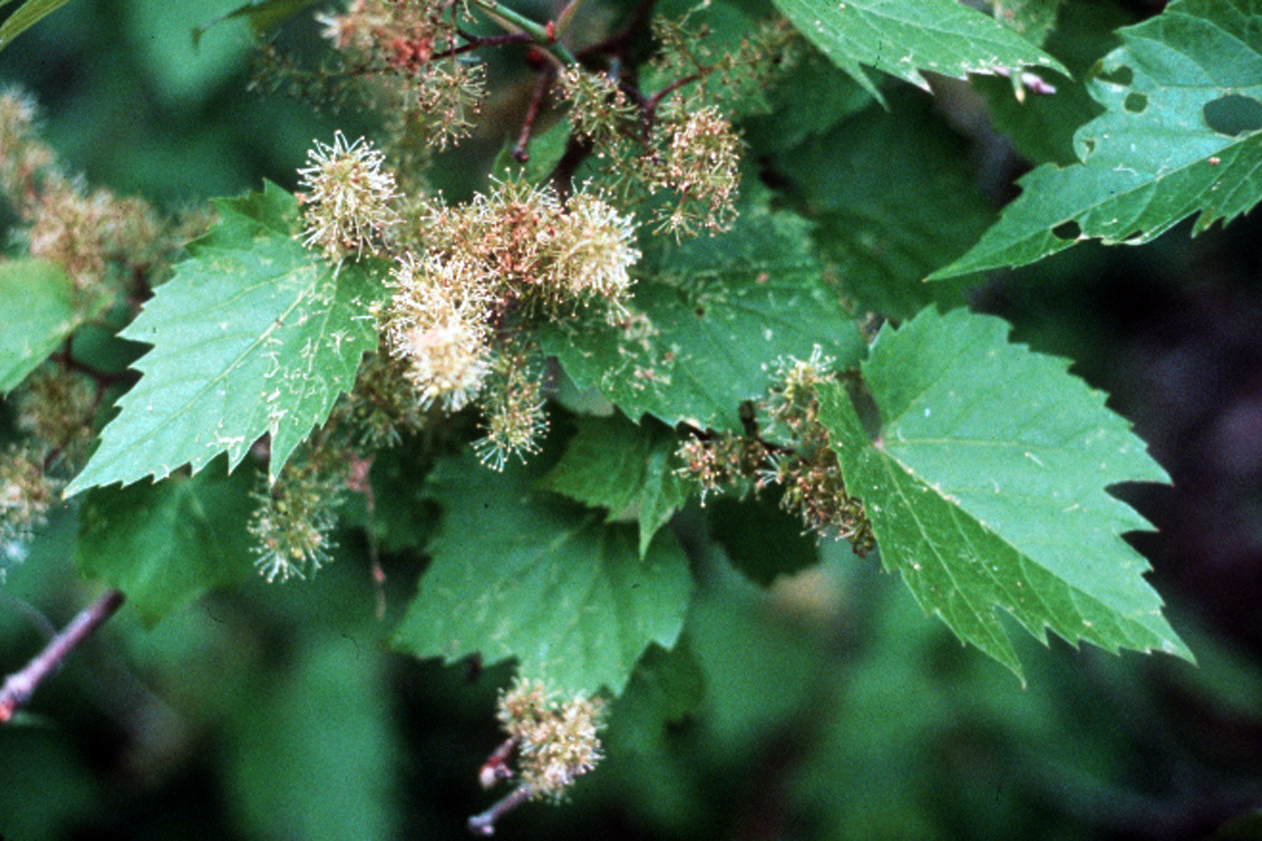

Scientific classification
- Kingdom: Plantae
- Clade: Tracheophytes
- Clade: Angiosperms
- Clade: Eudicots
- Clade: Rosids
- Order: Vitales
- Family: Vitaceae
- Genus: Vitis
- Species: V. riparia

Binomial name
- Vitis riparia Michx.

= Vitis riparia =

Species of grapevine

Vitis riparia Michx, with common names riverbank grape or frost grape, is a vine indigenous to North America. As a climbing or trailing vine, it is widely distributed across central and eastern Canada and the central and northeastern parts of the United States, from Quebec to Texas, and eastern Montana to Nova Scotia. There are reports of isolated populations in the northwestern USA, but these are probably naturalized. It is long-lived and capable of reaching into the upper canopy of the tallest trees. It produces dark fruit that are appealing to both birds and people, and has been used extensively in commercial viticulture as grafted rootstock and in hybrid grape breeding programs.

Riverbank grape is a translation of the scientific name Vitis riparia; rīpārius means 'of riverbanks' in Latin, deriving from rīpa 'riverbank'.

== Description ==
Mature vines have loose, fissured bark, and may attain several inches in diameter. Leaves are alternate, often with opposite tendrils or inflorescences, coarsely toothed, 5–25 cm (2.0–9.8 in) long and 5–20 cm (2.0–7.9 in) broad, sometimes with sparse hairs on the underside of veins.

V. riparia is functionally dioecious. The inflorescence is a panicle 4–15 cm (1.6–5.9 in) long and loose, and the flowers are small, fragrant, and white or greenish in color. V. riparia blooms sometime between April and June and in August or September produces a small 6–15 mm (0.24–0.59 in) blue-black berry (grape) with a bloom, seeded, juicy, edible, vinous in flavor, lacking the "foxy" characteristics of Vitis labrusca, but usually quite sour and herbaceous. V. riparia has a wide range and may deviate considerably in detail from the above general description. White berries, perfect flowers, large clusters, large berries, and sweet fruit are among the known variations. However, some observers consider such variations as evidence of natural hybridization with other species of grapes.

== Habitat ==
Vitis riparia has the largest geographical range of any of the North American Vitis species. It is present across nearly the entire eastern half of North America, from southern Quebec, to Piedmont, Alabama, and the Carolinas but absent of the coastal plains and the westerner parts of North America of the Great Plains. Variants of the species have been observed as far north as Riding Mountain National Park in Manitoba, Canada and as far west as Montana, Nebraska, and North Dakota.

In the wild, the vine thrives along exposed areas with good sun exposure and adequate soil moisture, such as riverbanks, forest clearings, fence lines and along road sides. The species has adapted to a variety of soil chemistries.

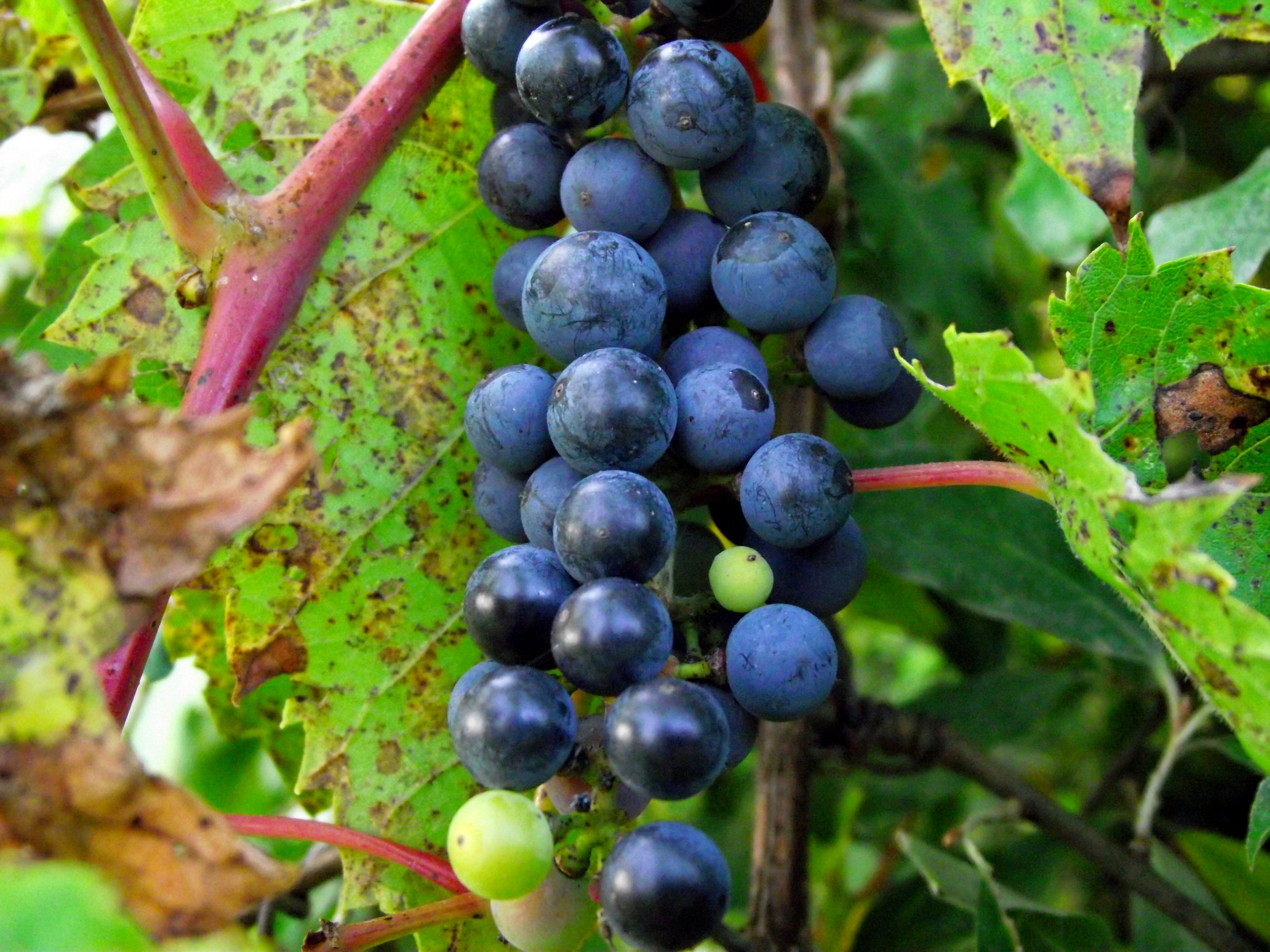
Frost grapes (Southeast Michigan)

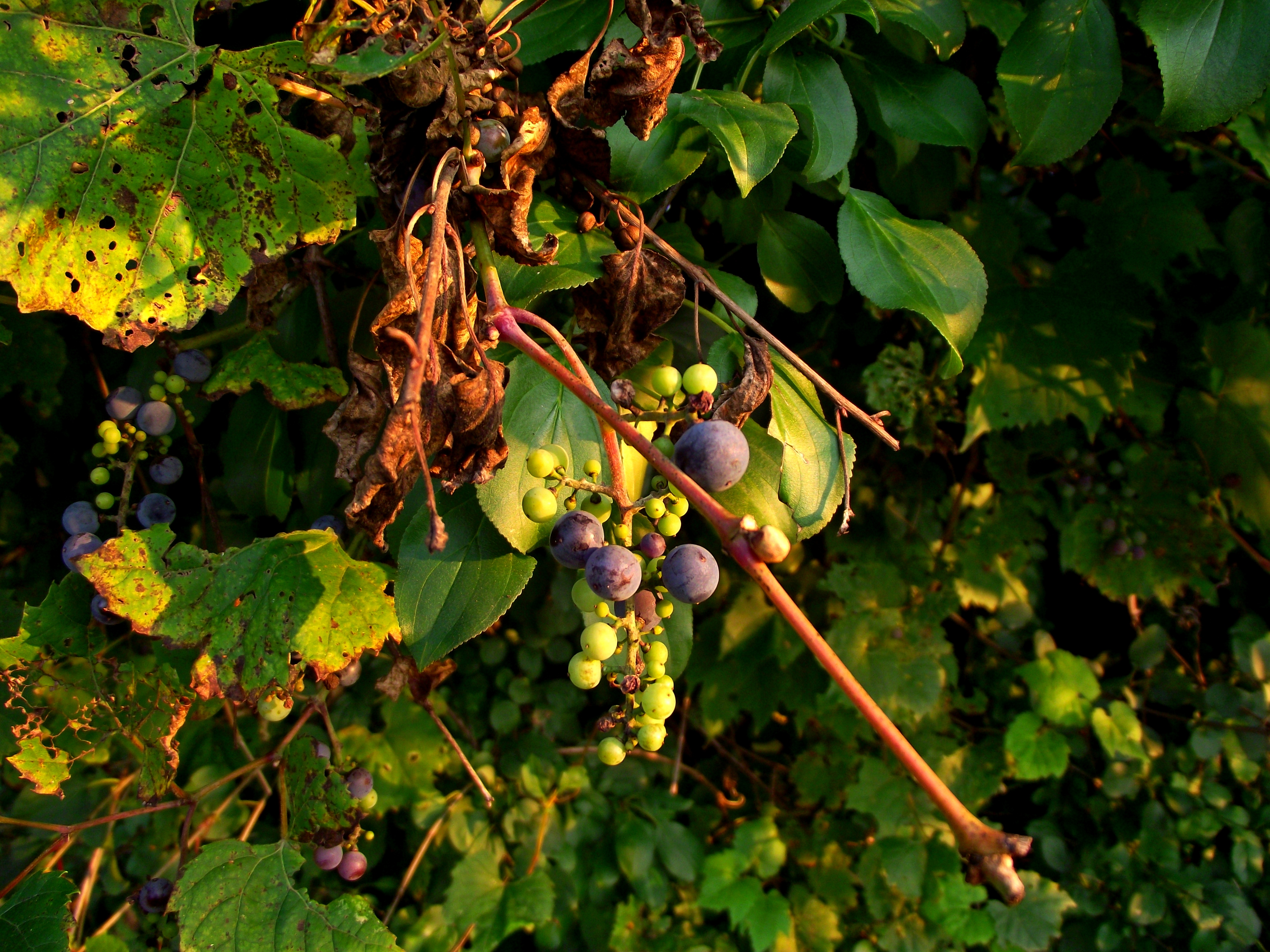
Frost grapes, immature grapes, and leaves (Late summer, Southeast Michigan)

== Cold hardiness and disease resistance ==
Some V. riparia vines have been known to withstand temperatures as low as −57 °C (−71 °F). The foliage is typically resistant to mildew and black rot, and the roots resistant to phylloxera. The berries, however, are often sensitive to mildew and black rot if the vine is exposed to prolonged wet and humid conditions.

== Uses ==
Perhaps the most significant agricultural usage of V. riparia is as grafted rootstock for Vitis vinifera. Important advantages of the use of V. riparia (and hybrids between it and other Vitis species) include resistance to phylloxera and adaptation to variant soil types.

Due to the extensive cold hardiness and fungal disease resistance of this species, it has been used extensively in grape breeding programs to transfer cold hardy and disease resistant genes to domesticated grapes. The French-American hybrid grapes are notable examples of these attempts. V. riparia has been used extensively for over a hundred years to create hardy hybrids. Many V. riparia hybrids are currently being used and investigated by plant breeders and in breeding programs such as those conducted by the University of Minnesota's horticulture program in an effort to make a commercially viable wine grape that can survive the northern climate of the Upper Midwest. Examples of commercially important cultivars with significant V. riparia ancestry include Baco noir, Marechal Foch, Triomphe d'Alsace and Frontenac.

While V. riparia shares many important characteristics with its cousin, Vitis vinifera, the small size of the berry (making it prone to predation by birds), the high acidity of its fruit (often up to 5% titratable acidity), the intense pigment of its juice, and the presence of herbaceous aromas in wine produced from it have made it unusable on its own for commercial viticulture.

These grapes are sometimes used to make flavorful homemade jellies, jams, and wine.

== Gallery ==
Vitis riparia

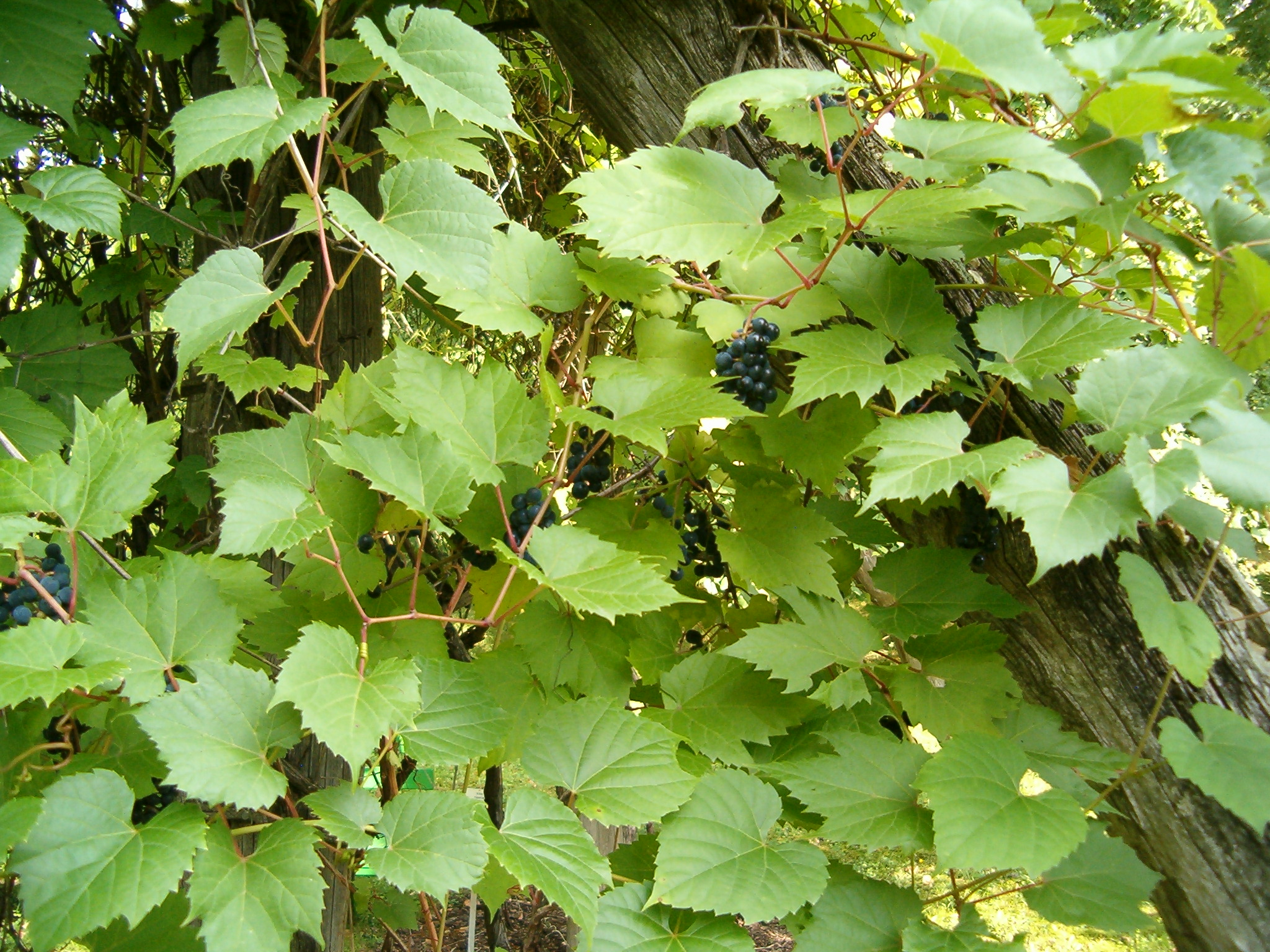
Botanical garden in Berlin, Germany

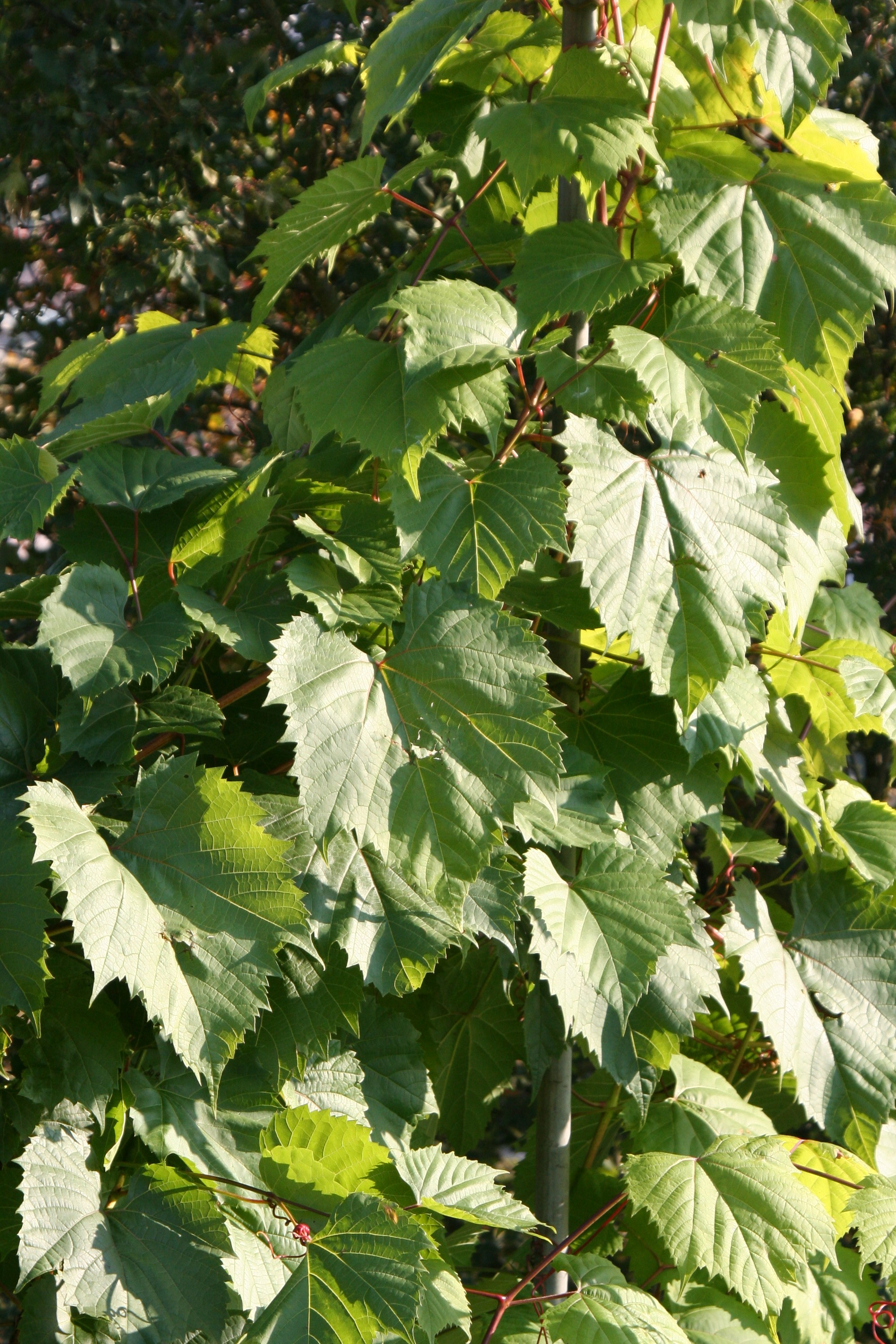
Vitis riparia in Germany

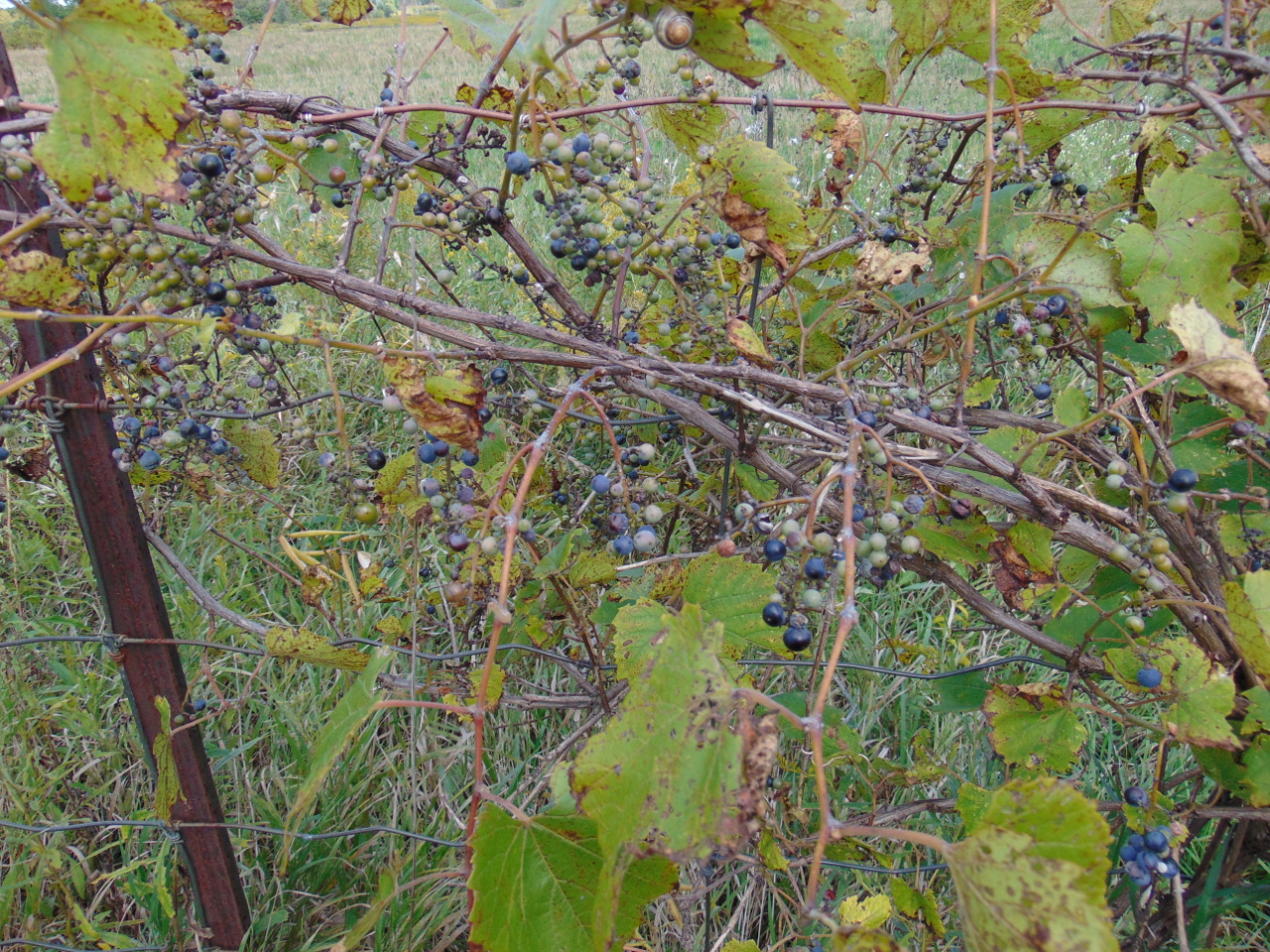
Ontario, Canada

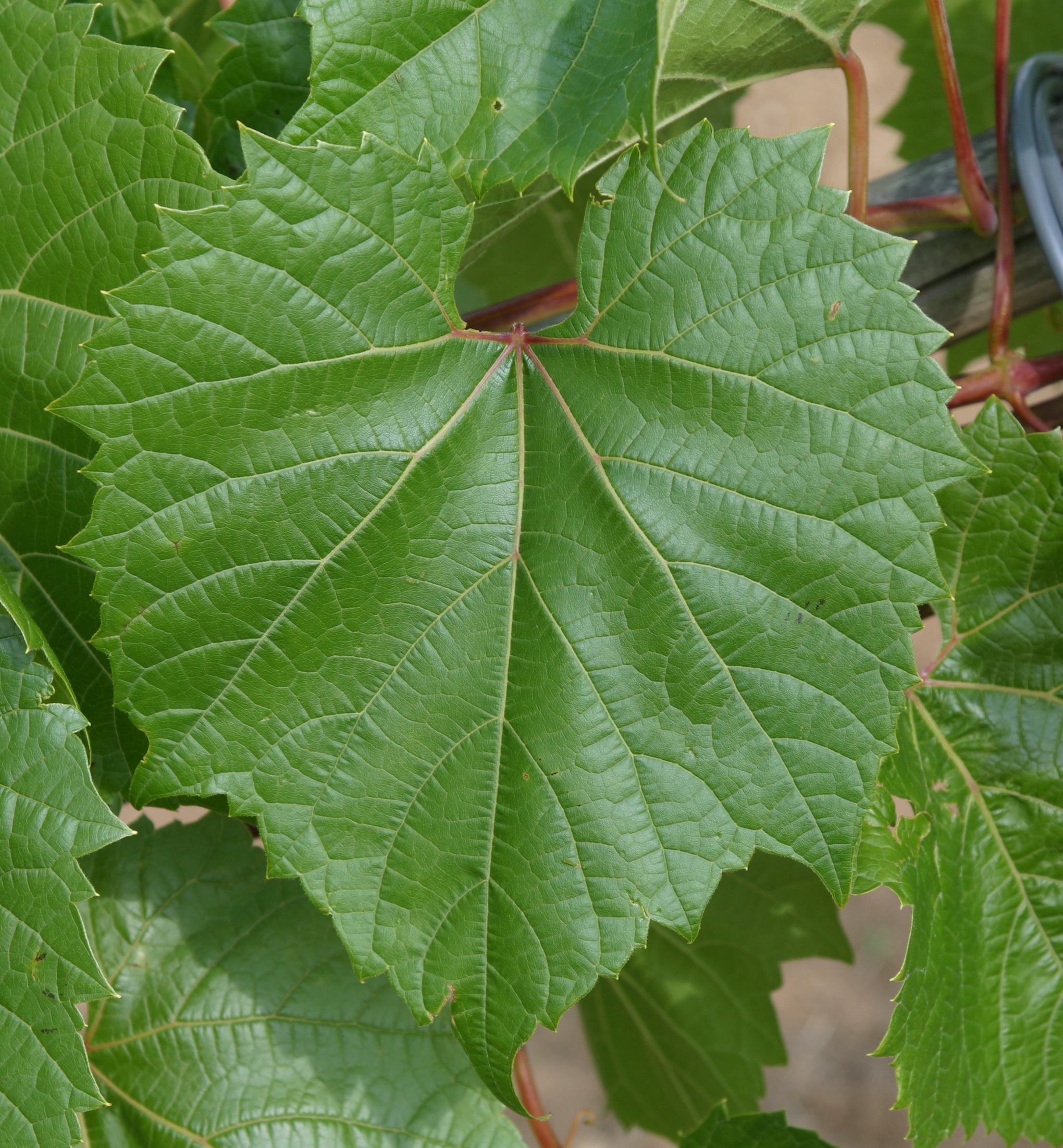
Vitis riparia leaf

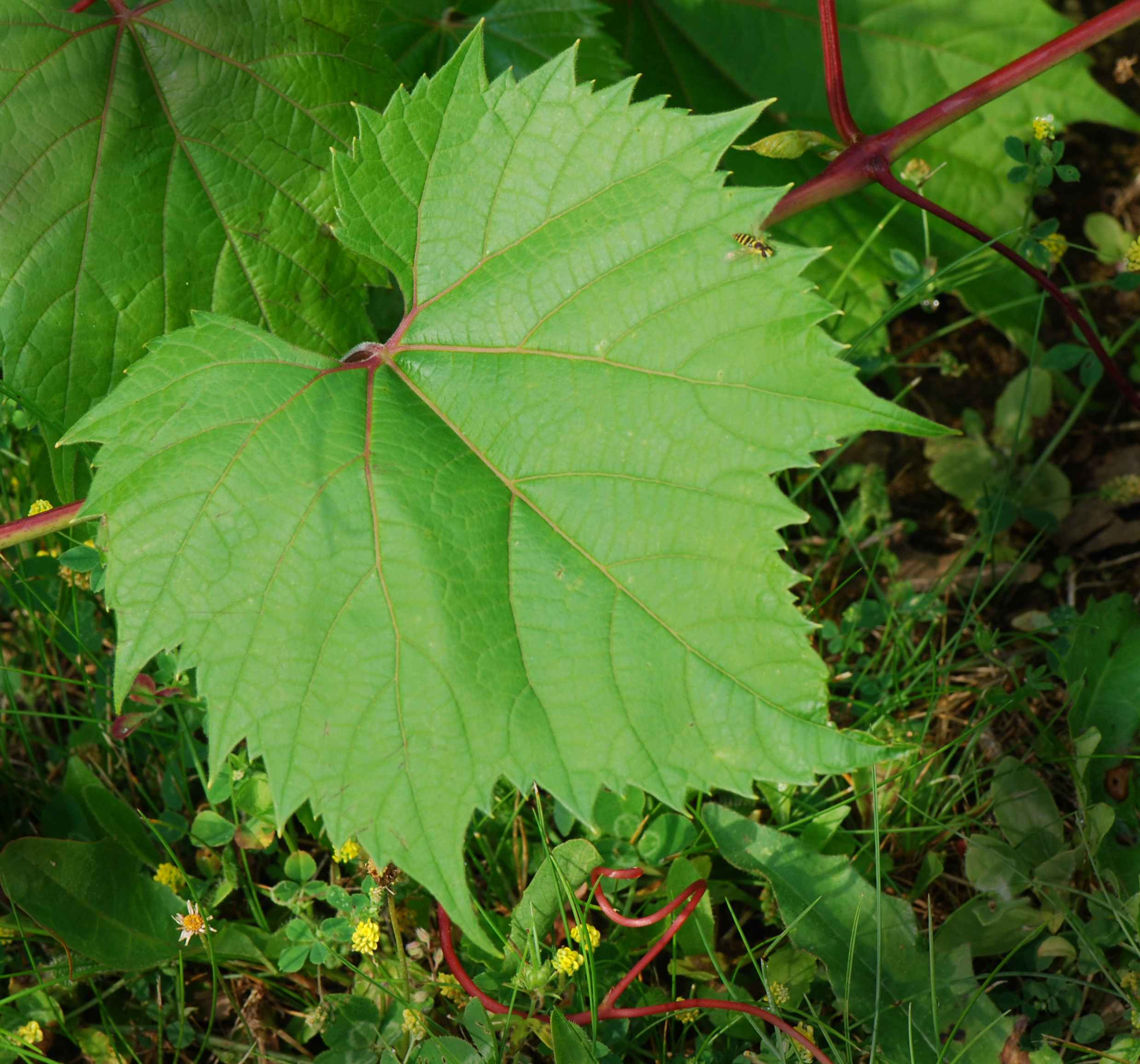
Riparia gloire de Montpellier (rootstock)
