= Landot noir =

Variety of grape

Landot noir (French: [lɑ̃do]) is a red hybrid grape variety that is a crossing of Landal and Villard blanc. Created after a series of trials between 1929-1949, the grape was introduced to Canada and the United States in the 1950s and today can be found in Quebec as well as New Hampshire where a varietal is produced by Jewell Towne Vineyards.

In the 1970s, viticulturists at the University of Minnesota crossed Landot noir with a Vitis riparia vine that was growing wild near Jordan, Minnesota to create the hybrid grape variety Frontenac.

== History and pedigree ==
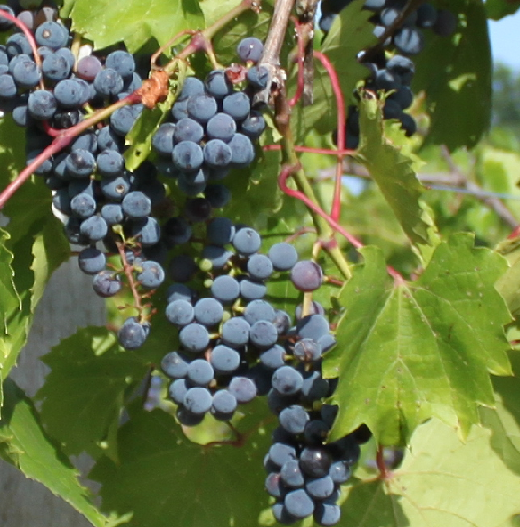
Landot noir was bred with a wild Vitis riparia vine growing in Minnesota to produce the hybrid grape Frontenac (pictured).

Landot noir was created by French grape breeder Pierre Landot from a series of trials conducted between 1929-1949 with vines growing in vineyard in Conzieu in the Ain department in eastern France. The vine was made by crossing one of Landot's earlier crossings, Landal, and Villard blanc which was created by French horticulturalist Bertille Seyve and his father-in-law Victor Villard. The grape was brought to North America in the mid-1950s and in 1978 was used by viticulturists at the University of Minnesota to create the hybrid grape Frontenac.

Landot noir is considered a "complex" interspecific hybrid which means that its pedigree includes several species from the Vitis genus. The father vine, Landal, was a result of a crossing of two Seibel grapes, Seibel 8216 (itself a complex hybrid that contains Vitis vinifera, Vitis rupestris and Vitis aestivalis in its lineage) and Plantet (another complex hybrid that includes Vitis berlandieri and Vitis cinerea in its lineage). Landot noir's mother vine, Villard blanc, was the result of crossing two Seibel grapes, Seibel 6905 and Seibel 6468, which both have similarly complex lineages.

== Viticulture ==
Landot noir is an early to mid-ripening grape variety that is noted for its cold-hardiness.

== Wine regions ==
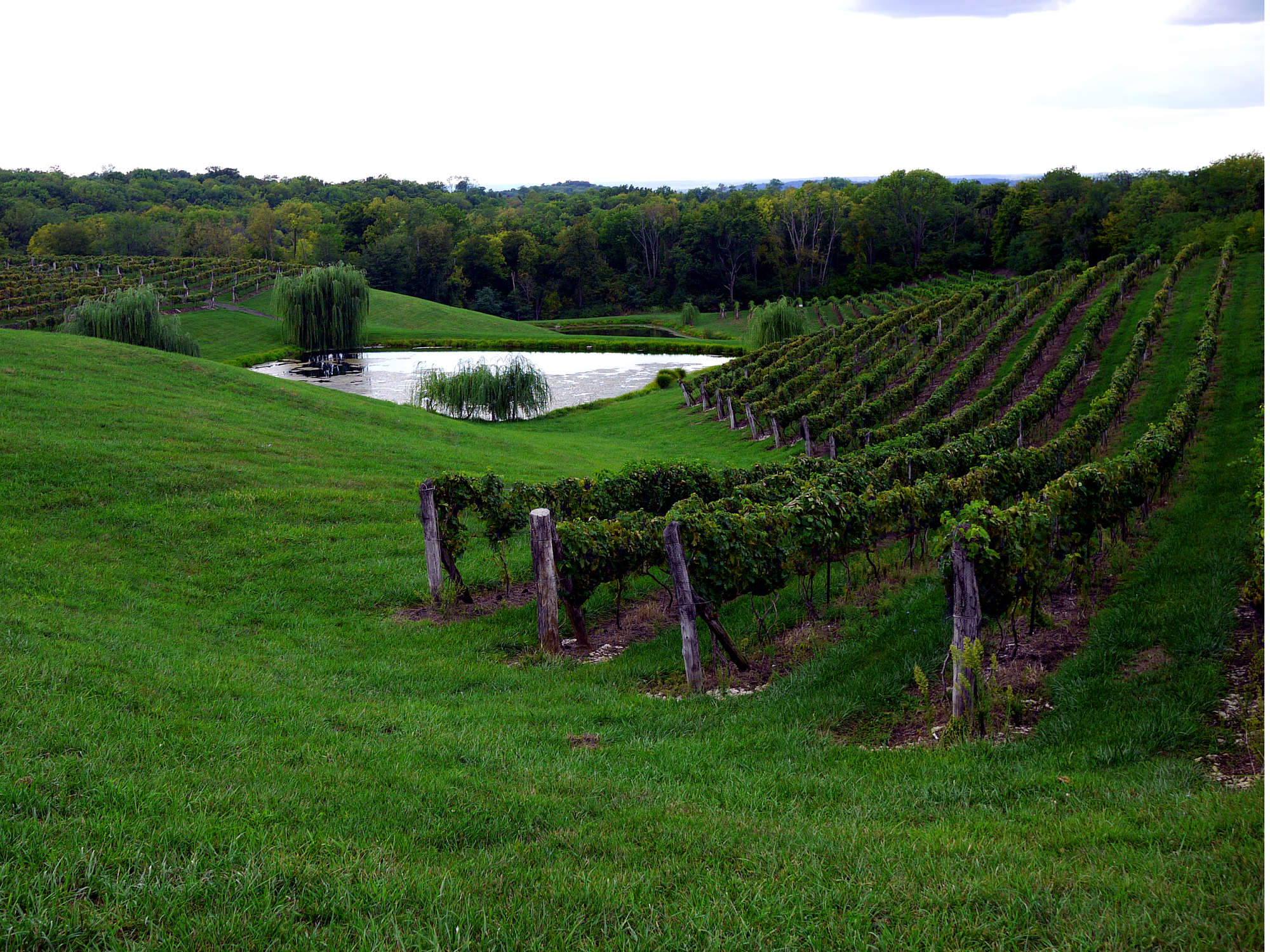
Vineyard in Ohio where Landot noir is grown.

Landot noir can be found in several wine regions throughout Canada and the United States. In Quebec, the grape is often blended with other hybrid varieties such as Landal, Cabernet Severny and Frontenac. In the United States plantings of Landot noir can be found in Illinois, Ohio, Rhode Island and New Hampshire where at least one winery is making a varietal wine.

== Styles ==
Landot noir can be used as both a blending grape and in varietal wines. According to Master of Wine Jancis Robinson, Landot noir tends to produce soft, light bodied wines that can have slight spicy note to them.

== Synonyms ==
As a relatively recently created hybrid grape Landot noir has not been known under many synonyms with only Landot 4511 being the only synonym recognized by Vitis International Variety Catalogue (VIVC).
