= Nova Scotia wine =

Canadian wine produced in the Canadian province of Nova Scotia

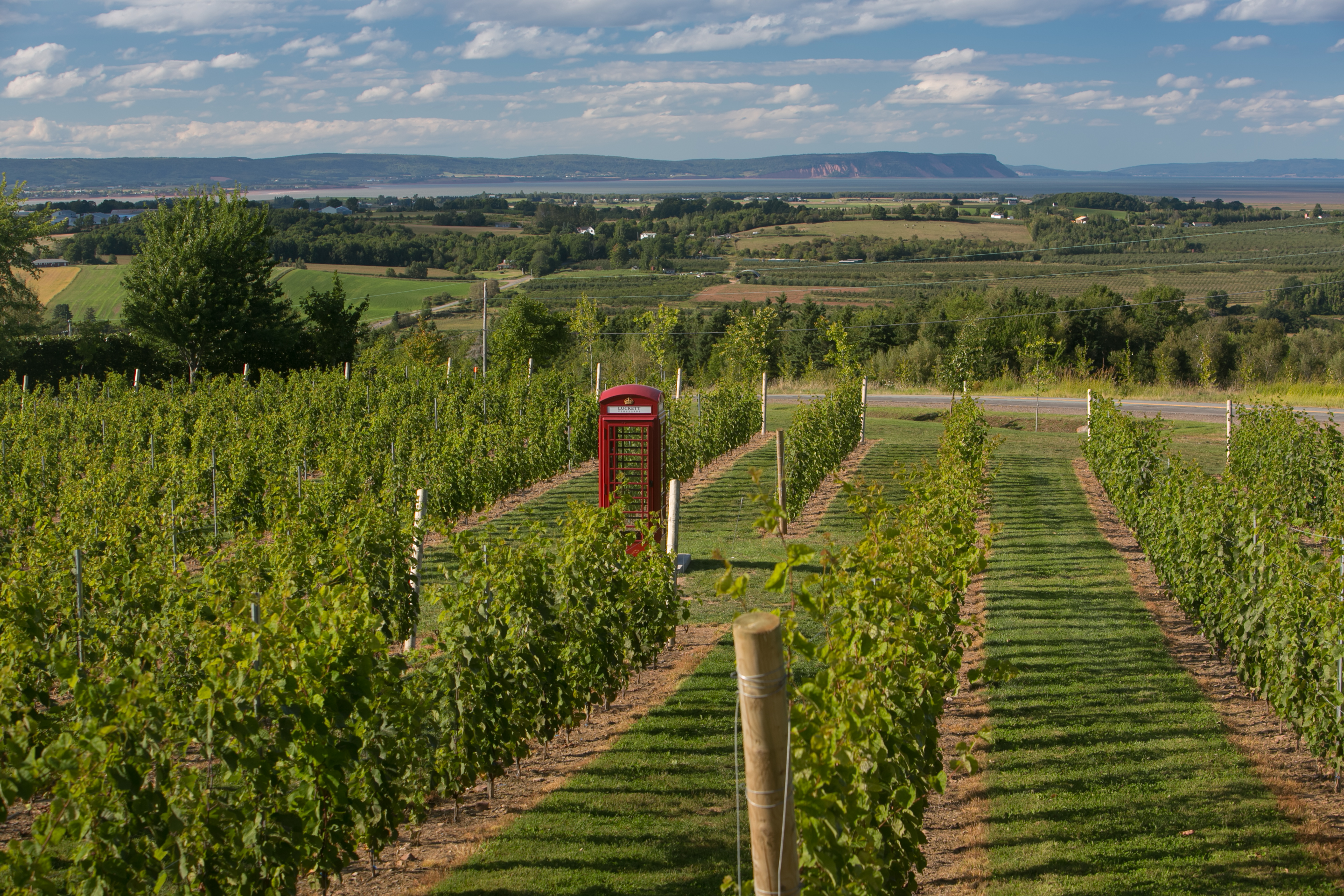
Vineyard overlooking Cape Blomidon in Nova Scotia's Gaspereau Valley wine region

Nova Scotia wine is Canadian wine from Nova Scotia. Most of its wineries are members of the Wine Association of Nova Scotia. The industry began in the late 1970s with the Grand Pré Winery in the Annapolis Valley.

== Location ==
There are four main regions: Annapolis Valley, Gaspereau Valley, South Shore, and the Malagash Peninsula. Grapes for wine are also grown elsewhere, including Cape Breton Island.

== History ==
Grape growing has been documented as early as the 1600s, when vines were planted in Annapolis Royal. The first mention of wine grape cultivation in Canada dates to 1634, when the governor of Acadia, Isaac de Razilly, wrote, "Bordeaux vines have been planted that are doing very well". . His vineyard was in La Hève, in modern Riverport. The Kentville Research Station in Kentville began experimenting with grape varieties in 1913. One of the most successful varieties was Vineland 53261, originally produced in Vineland, Ontario, and now commonly known as L'Acadie Blanc.

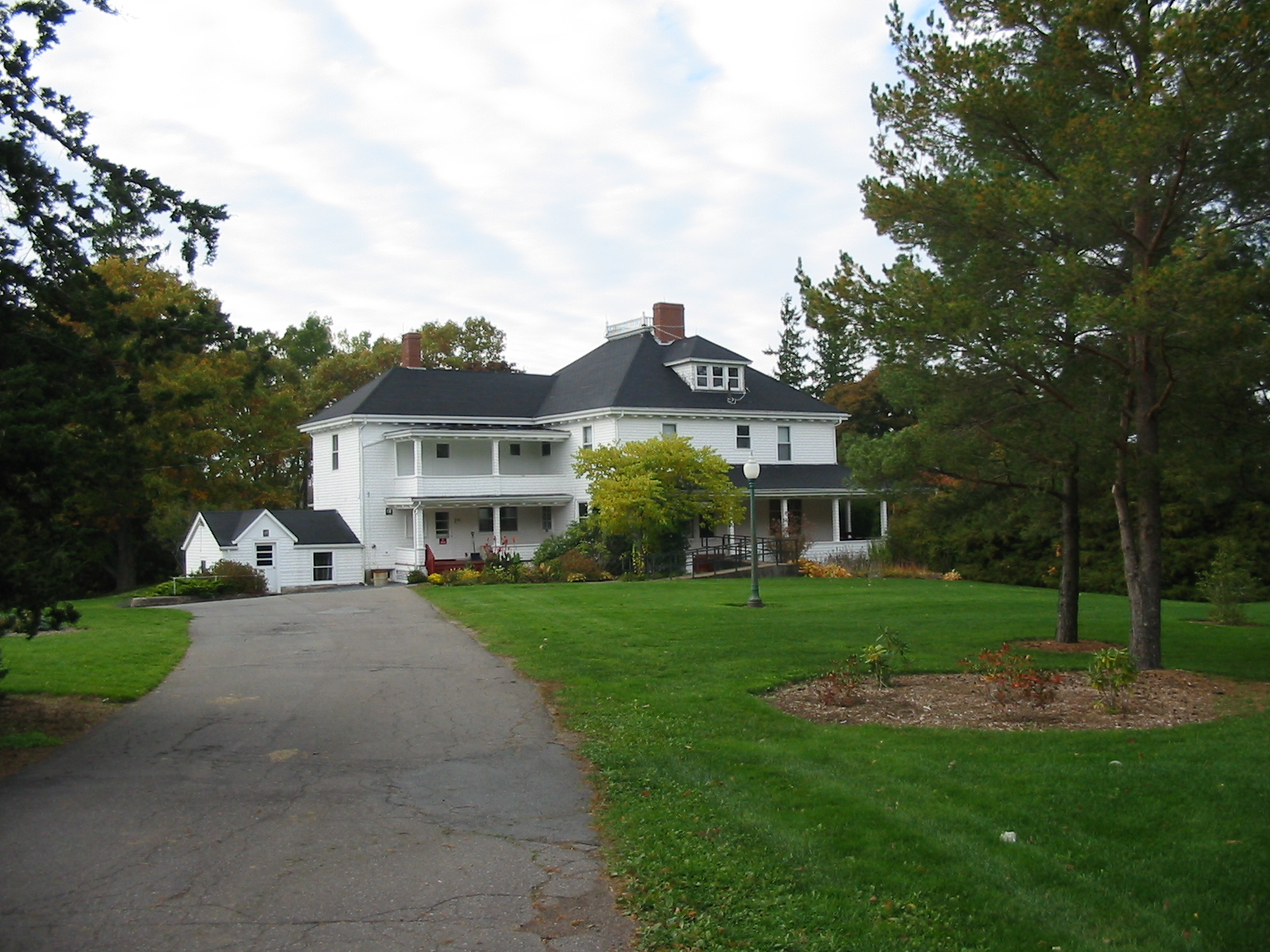
Residence of the chief researcher at the Kentville research station where experimentation with grape varieties began about 1912

A Cellared in Canada (now known as International-Domestic blend) wine operation began in Truro in 1964 as part of the Peller brand, but commercial grape production in Nova Scotia is undocumented until 1979 with the arrival of Grand Pre Winery in Grand-Pré, owned by Roger Dial, founder of Appellation America. He planted L'Acadie Blanc and other varieties. Jost Vineyards under Hans Jost also began in the early 1980s on the Malagash Point peninsula next to the warm waters of the Northumberland Strait and Amet Sound. The Jost vineyard is the longest running winery in Nova Scotia.

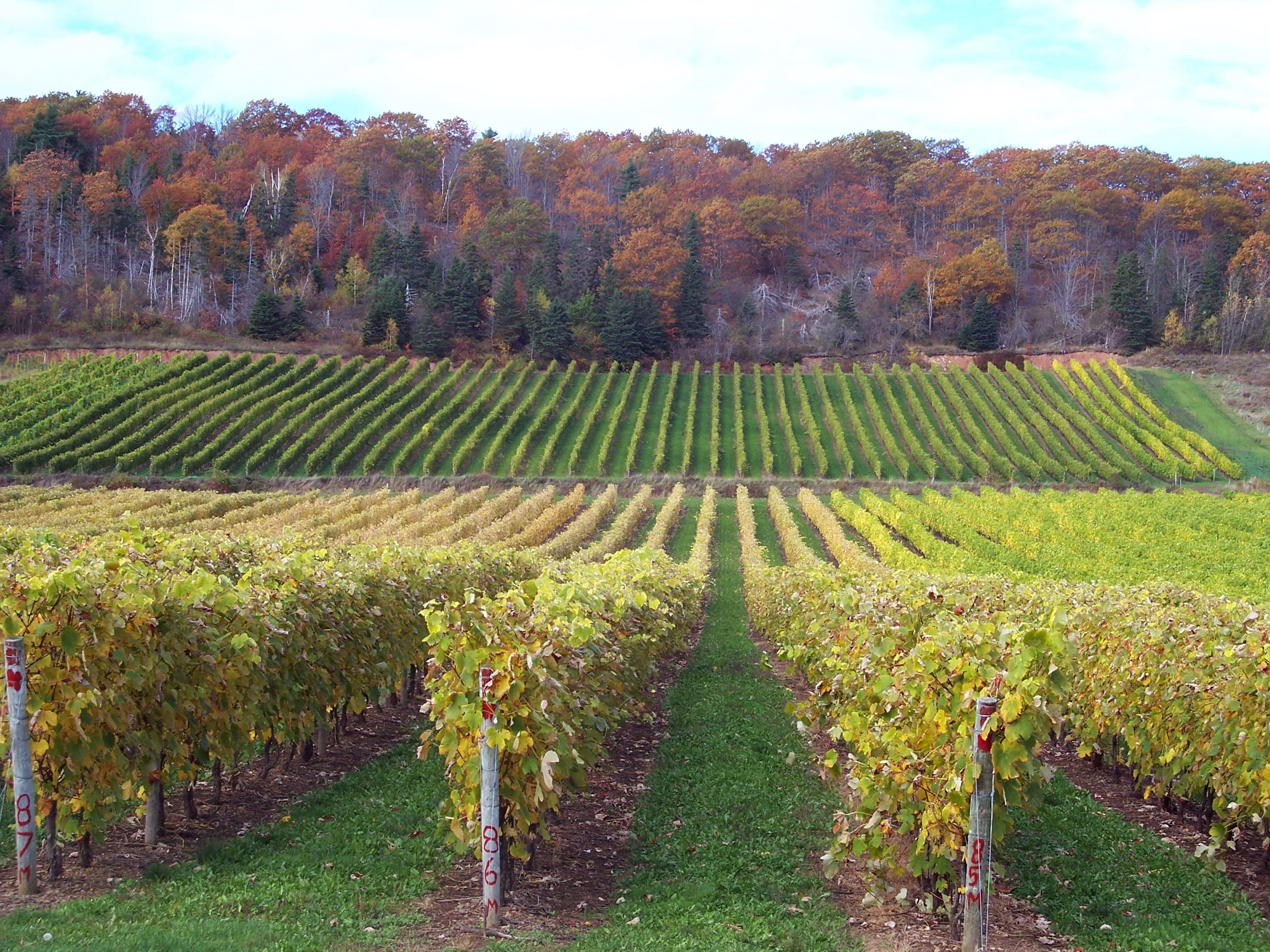
Gaspereau Vineyards vines are situated on a south-facing slope to maximize sun exposure

The industry has since expanded, with wineries such as St. Famille, Gaspereau Vineyards, Blomidon Estate Winery in the 1990s and fruit wineries such as Lunenburg County Winery. In 2003, the Wine Association of Nova Scotia (WANS) was created, of which most participants of the industry are members. It promotes and coordinates the efforts of the province's wineries. By 2015 there were 70 grape growers and nearly two dozen wineries, with 632 acres (256 ha) of vineyards. In December 2015, the provincial government announced funding to support the expansion of the industry, with a goal of doubling production by 2020.

== Climate ==
Various regions' climate, microclimate, and soils vary significantly. Temperatures rarely drop below -23 degrees Celsius, which allows more varieties of vines to be grown compared to Cape Breton Island.

== Varieties ==
Most grapes for wine had been hybrid vines, because of their cold hardiness and disease resistance. In recent years, wineries have experimented with vinifera grapes, to moderate success.

Hybrid Vines

- L'Acadie blanc
- Seyval Blanc
- Vidal Blanc
- New York Muscat
- Mischurnitz
- Seyverni
- Geisenheim 318
- Baco Noir
- Marechal Foch
- Luci Kuhlmann
- Leon Millot
- Castel
- Cabernet Foch
- De Chaunac
- Marquette

Vinifera Vines

- Chardonnay
- Pinot Noir
- Pinot Gris
- Riesling
- Sauvignon Blanc
- Cabernet Franc
- Chasselas
- Gamay Noir

== Styles ==
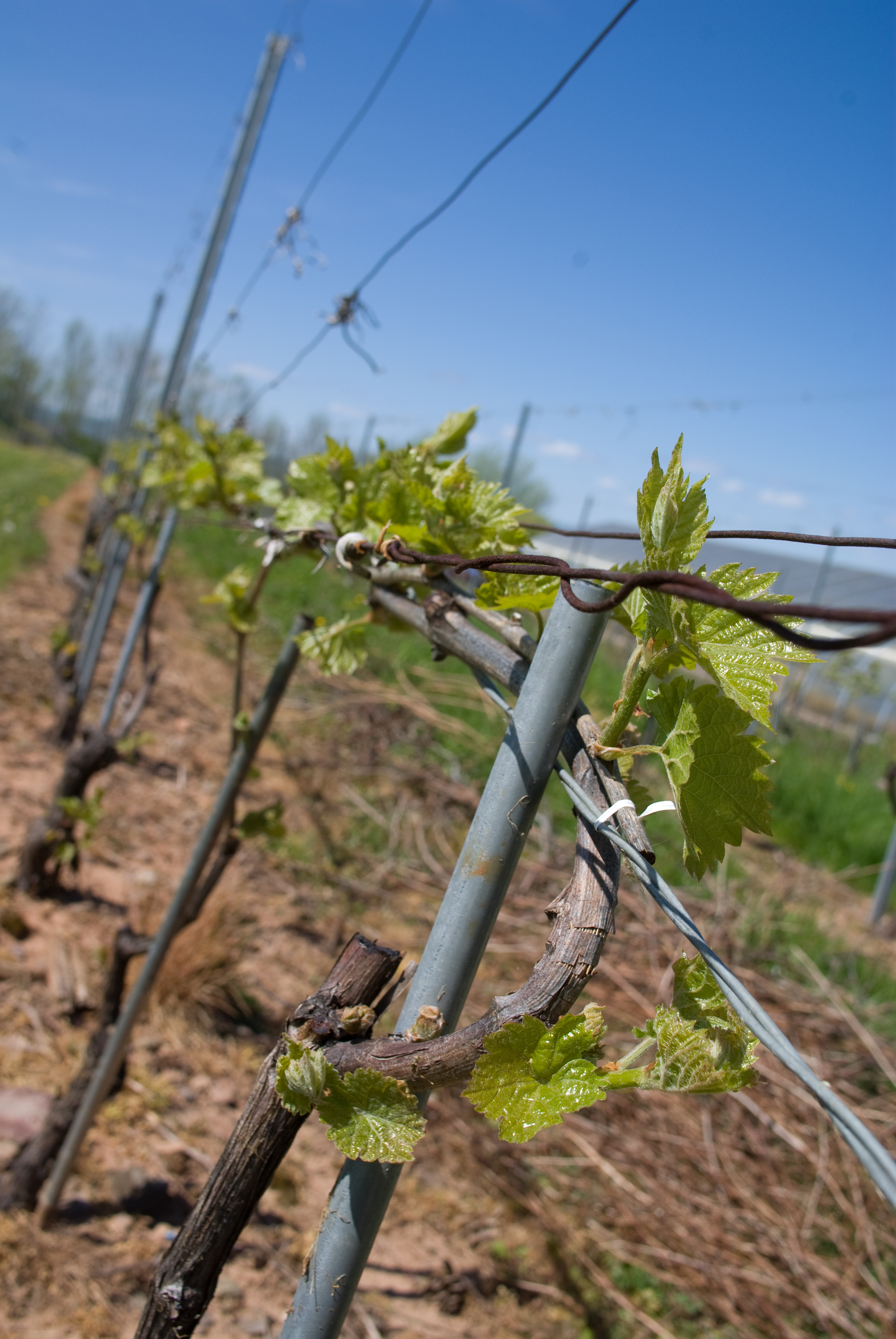
A young L'Acadie blanc vine being trained in Nova Scotia.

=== Sparkling ===
Nova Scotia is best known for its sparkling wine, much of which consumed locally. Wineries including Benjamin Bridge, L'Acadie Vineyards, and Blomidon Estate Winery use the traditional method. Some of them are sold outside the province.

=== White ===
White wines are crisp and fruity. Hybrid white grapes were the only ones produced in any quantity, white vinifera has seen some success, particularly Chardonnay and Riesling.

=== Tidal Bay ===
The Tidal Bay appellation was created by the wineries of the province and WANS in 2011. Its first vintage was 2012. It is made from a blend of at least 51% L'Acadie Blanc, Seyval Blanc, Vidal, and Geisenheim 318 grapes, with 16 other varieties also allowed. The wines are vetted by blind tasting.

=== Red ===
Red wines remain relatively unknown outside of the province. Most red vinifera does not ripen well, though Pinot Noir and Gamay grapes have been produced to some success in the Bear River valley at the western end of the Annapolis Valley. Nonetheless, there is local demand for hybrid reds, including Baco Noir, Maréchal Foch, Luci Kuhlmann, and Leon Millot.

=== Icewine ===
Icewine is produced by most wineries, primarily with the Vidal Blanc grape, though others, including Riesling, have been used. Production in the province is small enough that most production is done by an independent grower, Warner Vineyards in Lakeville. [citation needed]

== See also ==
- British Columbia wine
- Ontario wine
- Quebec wine
