= Quebec wine =

Canadian wine made in the province of Quebec

Quebec
- Wine region
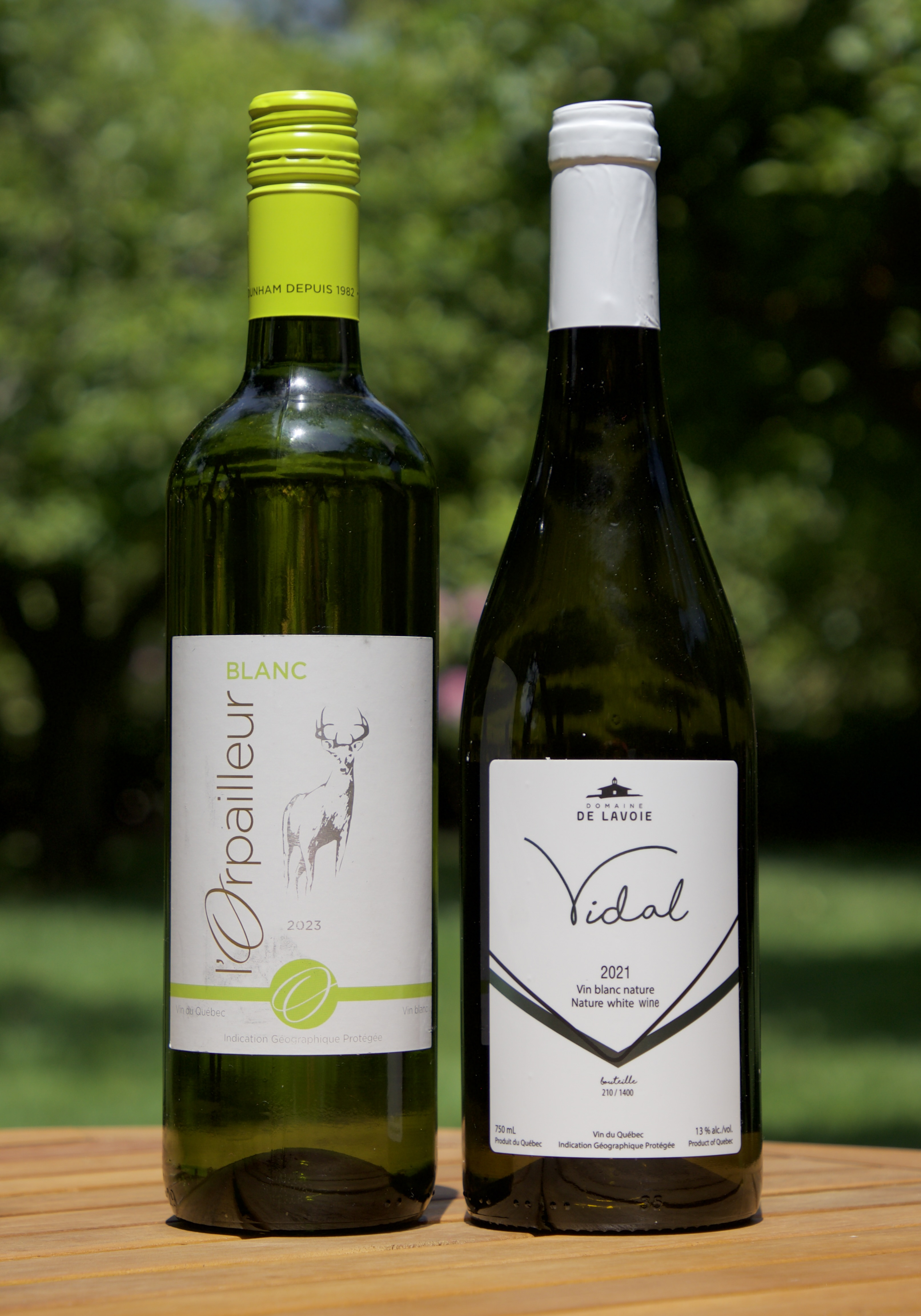
- Two bottles of Québec white wine
- Official name: Québec
- Type: Canadian province
- Year established: 1867
- Years of wine industry: 1970s (grapes grown since 1608)
- Country: Canada
- Sub-regions: Basses Laurentides, Lanaudière, Québec, Montérégie, Eastern Townships, Centre-du-Québec
- Total area: 1,542,056 km^{2}
- Size of planted vineyards: 249,3 ha
- Varietals produced: white: Adalmiina, Cayuga, Chardonnay, Delisle, Eona, Geisenheim, Hibernal, Kay Gray, Muscat, New York Muscat, Prairie Star, Riesling, Saint-Pépin, Seyval blanc, Vandal-Cliche, Vidal; Red: Baco noir, Cabernet Franc, Cabernet Sauvignon Severnyi, Chambaudière, Chambourcin, Chancellor, De Chaunac, Frontenac, Gamay, Landal noir, Landot noir, Léon-Millot, Lucie Kuhlmann, Maréchal Foch, Merlot, Mitchurinetz, Pinot noir, Pionnier, Radisson, Sabrevois, Sainte-Croix, Seyval noir
- No. of wineries: 49
- Wine produced: 234

Quebec wine is wine made in the province of Quebec. The grape varieties grown in Quebec, both white and red, all have common qualities needed by the harshness of the winter season, including resistance to winter temperatures, resistance to spring freezes and being early ripening. Some 40 varieties are grown in Quebec, with the most commonly planted being Maréchal Foch, Frontenac, De Chaunac, Vidal and Seyval blanc.

Quebec wine makers have developed a large array of products including dry, semi-dry and fortified wines (including Vin doux naturel styles). Additionally the region produces ice wines, late harvest wines, sparkling wines and fruit wines.

Quebec counts six regions where vines are cultivated. They are the Eastern Townships, Montérégie, Québec, Basses Laurentides, Lanaudière, and Centre-du-Québec.

== History ==
When French explorer Jacques Cartier sailed the St. Lawrence River, he noted the presence of wild grapes (Vitis riparia) on Île d'Orléans and for this reason named it Île de Bacchus, in honour of the Roman God of wine and drunkenness. In 1608, when Samuel de Champlain settled the site where Quebec City would later flourish, he planted French vines (Vitis vinifera) and discovered that they did not resist the winter very well. Small productions were nonetheless tried here and there over the years and in the 18th century, the inhabitants of the French colony were in the habit of making wine out of the wild grapes and other fruits. While the production remained small, the import of wine bottles from France was quite important (775,166 bottles in 1739 for an above-15 population of only 24 260 persons).

Following the conquest of French Canada by the British army in 1760, imports of French wine depleted quickly, as Great Britain's colonial policy favoured trade within the British Empire. Spirits (whisky, gin, rum, etc.) thus became the dominant type of alcohol being consumed by Quebecers and remained so until the late 19th century when trade relations between Canada and France were revived as a result of the British adoption of laissez faire.

In 1864, the Quebec government tried to encourage wine production in the province through subsidies. Wild grapes were again tried as well as hybrid varieties from the United States. The emerging industry went through important difficulties, not the least of which was the temperance movement trying to reduce the consumption of alcohol altogether and by the 1920s succeeding at prohibiting alcohol in the United States and all provinces of Canada. Despite the will of Quebecers, who voted at 81.1% against prohibition in the September 29, 1898 Canadian-wide referendum on the subject, the Parliament of Quebec enacted a law of total prohibition, which became effective on May 1, 1919. Shortly after, a Quebec-wide referendum was held in which Quebecers voted the exclusion of beer, wine, and cider from the prohibition list. Quebec remained the sole region of North America to escape total prohibition.

=== 20th century to modern day ===
In 1921, an Alcoholic Beverages Act was passed and the Commission des liqueurs du Québec was established to conduct the trade of beer, wine and cider, and eventually spirits too. This state-owned corporation would then on exercise a legal monopoly on all distribution of alcohol in Quebec, which it still enjoys today (though the corporation now bears the name of Société des alcools du Québec).

With the diversification of Quebecers' alcohol consumption habits ultimately came a demand for local products. In the 1970s, some farmers began experimenting with hybrid varieties, both white and red. Early successes at developing quality products, prompted many others to follow and the 1980s and 1990s saw the burgeoning of numerous vineyards all over southern Quebec.

In 1987, the first few Quebec wine growers formed an association. The successes of some of its members ultimately caught the attention of the French and in 1995, the Association des Vignerons du Québec and the Syndicat viticole des Graves et Graves supérieures of the Bordeaux region united in a professional partnership.

== Climate and geography ==
The St. Lawrence river valley, south of the province, is a fertile region where wild grapes and other fruits grow naturally and abundantly. However, the four-month-long winter of this humid continental climate zone freezes the land deep enough that most varieties of European vines do not survive. In the 1980s, Quebec wine growers started planting varieties known for their resistance to below-zero temperatures and in certain cases made use of modern techniques to heat up the soil during the coldest days of winter. Quebec wine makers have 6 months to accomplish what in warmer wine regions takes 11 to 12 months to do.

Soil conditions, drainage and local topography provide many microclimates where grapes can flourish. Despite historic attempts to grow grapes along the St. Lawrence River, the Southern Appalachian Piedmont around Dunham is considered the heartland for wine grapes in Quebec. The average rainfall is between 661 and 819mm, frost-free days between 196 and 207, and degree days : between 1171 and 1348.

"L’Association des vignerons du Québec", literally the Quebec vineyard keeper's association was formed in 1987, and renamed in 2018 as le Conseil des vins du Québec (CVQ), literally the Wine Council of Quebec, classifies nine growing regions. From west to east, south to north: 1) the Ottawa River valley and several south flowing tributaries; 2) Two Mountains, which includes the western half of the island of Montreal and areas along the Ottawa and St Lawrence Rivers; 3) the Richelieu Valley which takes in the western corner of the province to the length of the Richelieu River; 4) located within and to the north are ten prominent geologic remnants known as the Montérégie where vineyards coexist with established orchards and sugar bushes; 5) east along the US border in the Eastern Townships is the Southern Appalachian Piedmont region, which is distinct from its neighbours; 6) following north along the edge of the Appalachian range is the Northern Appalachian Piedmont; 7) to the east within the hilly range are the Appalachian Plateaus; 8) on the north and south shores of the Lake Saint-Pierre region are many small rivers which moderate the local climate; and 9) downstream to Quebec City and beyond along the St. Lawrence River and Ile d'Orleans.

== Grape varieties ==
The vine varieties that seem to grow the best in Quebec are those of the Northern France, Germany, and North-Eastern United States. Some 40 varieties are grown in Quebec, with the most commonly planted being, for red wine, Sainte-Croix, Maréchal Foch, Frontenac, Sabrevois and De Chaunac, and for white wine, Vidal, Seyval blanc, L'Acadie blanc, Vandal-Cliche and Geisenheim. In 2008, vines used in red wine made up 60% of the total planted area.

== See also ==
- Beer in Quebec
- Quebec cider
- British Columbia wine
- Ontario wine
- Nova Scotia wine
- Cuisine of Quebec
