= L'Acadie blanc =

Variety of grape

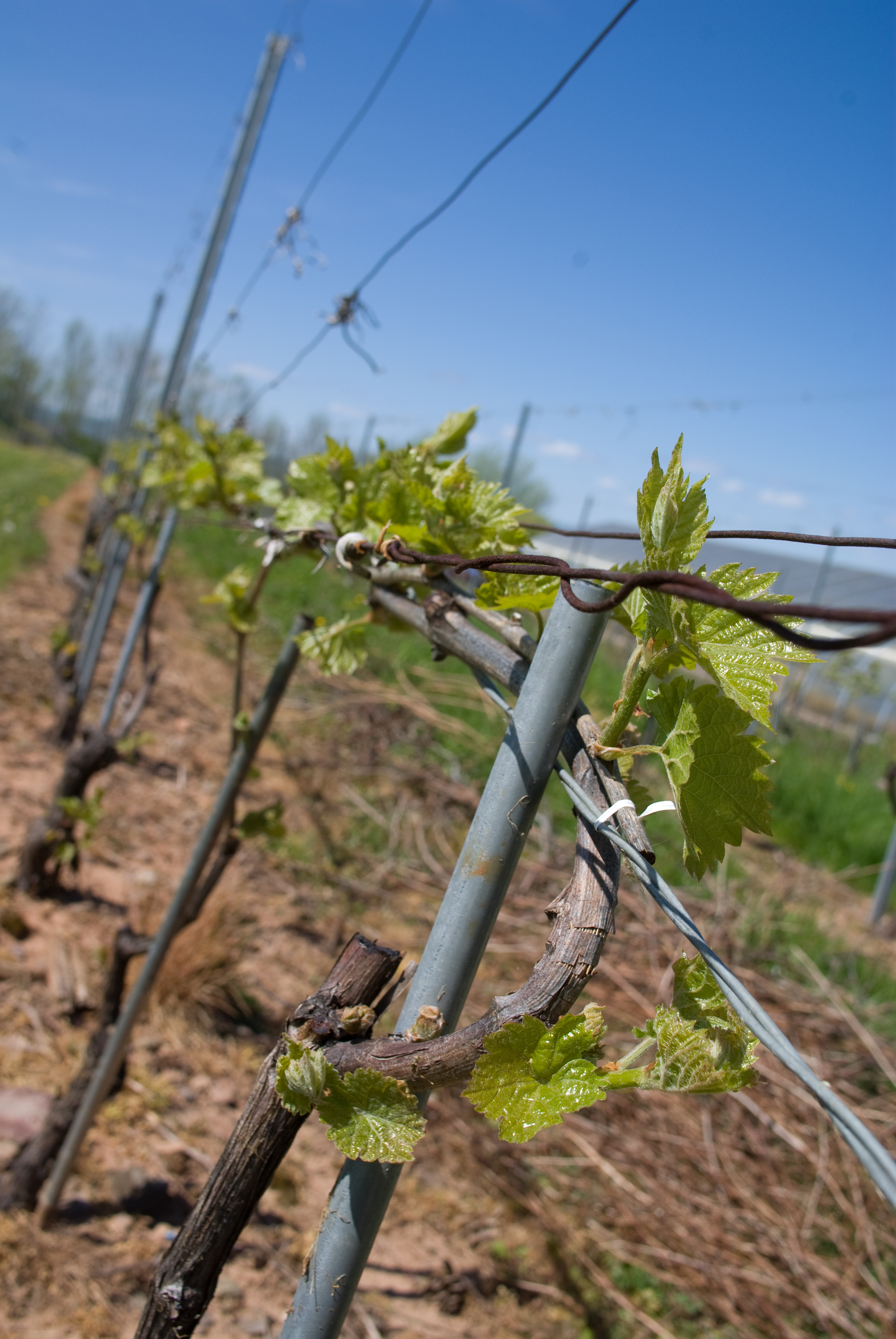
A young L'Acadie blanc vine being trained.

L'Acadie blanc is a white Canadian wine grape variety that is a hybrid crossing of Cascade and Seyve-Villard 14-287. The grape was created in 1953 by grape breeder Ollie A. Bradt in Niagara, Ontario at the Vineland Horticultural Research Station, which is now the Vineland Research and Innovation Centre. Today the grape is widely planted in Nova Scotia with some plantings in Quebec and Ontario. Some wine writers, including those at Appellation America, consider L'Acadie blanc as "Nova Scotia’s equivalent to Chardonnay".

The grape is considered a complex hybrid which means that it has genes from several different species of genus Vitis in its lineage. The full lineage of L'Acadie blanc was mapped out by Helen Fisher of the University of Guelph and revealed that the grape has members from eight different Vitis species including Vitis aestivalis, Vitis berlandieri, Vitis cinerea, Vitis labrusca, Vitis lincecumii, Vitis riparia, Vitis rupestris and Vitis vinifera. In contrast, around 99% of the world's wine is made from grapes belonging only to Vitis vinifera species.

== History and pedigree ==
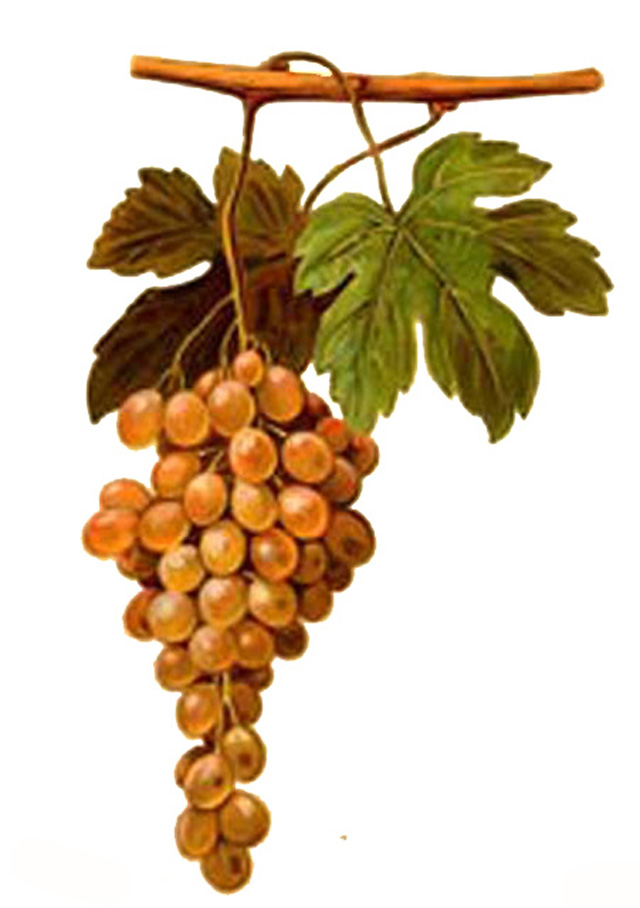
Pedro Ximénez, one of the great-grandparent varieties of L'Acadie blanc.

L'Acadie blanc was created in 1953 by Ollie Bradt at the Vineland Horticultural Research Station in Niagara, Ontario. The grape is a crossing the Seibel grape Cascade and the Villard grape Seyve-Villard 14-287, both bred by French horticulturalists. Cuttings of the new grape variety were sent to the Kentville research station (now known as the Kentville Research and Development Centre) in Kentville, Nova Scotia. Here the grape was given the name L'Acadie blanc after Acadia, the former New France colony that is now part of The Maritimes in eastern Canada.

L'Acadie blanc is a complex hybrid with an extensive lineage that was mapped out by University of Guelph professor Helen Fisher. Within L'Acadie blanc's pedigree are members of several Vitis species including V. aestivalis, V. berlandieri, V. cinerea, V. labrusca, V. lincecumii, V. riparia, V. rupestris and V. vinifera. Some of the notable members of L'Acadie blanc's family tree include:

- Seyve-Villard 14-287, one of L'Acadie blanc's parent varieties, which itself is a complex hybrid crossing of the Seibel grape Seibel 6747 and Muscat du Moulin
- Muscat du Moulin is also a complex hybrid of Couderc 603 (a sibling of Couderc noir) and the Vitis vinifera Spanish wine grape Pedro Ximénez
- Couderec 603 is a crossing of the Vitis vinifera French wine grape Bourrisquou from Ardèche and an unknown Vitis rupestris hybrid
- Cascade, one of L'Acadie blanc's parent varieties, has a long and complex pedigree itself with Concord, Chasselas Musqué, the Vitis vinifera teinturier grapes Alicante Bouschet and Alicante Ganzin as well as the Munson grape in its lineage.

== Viticulture ==
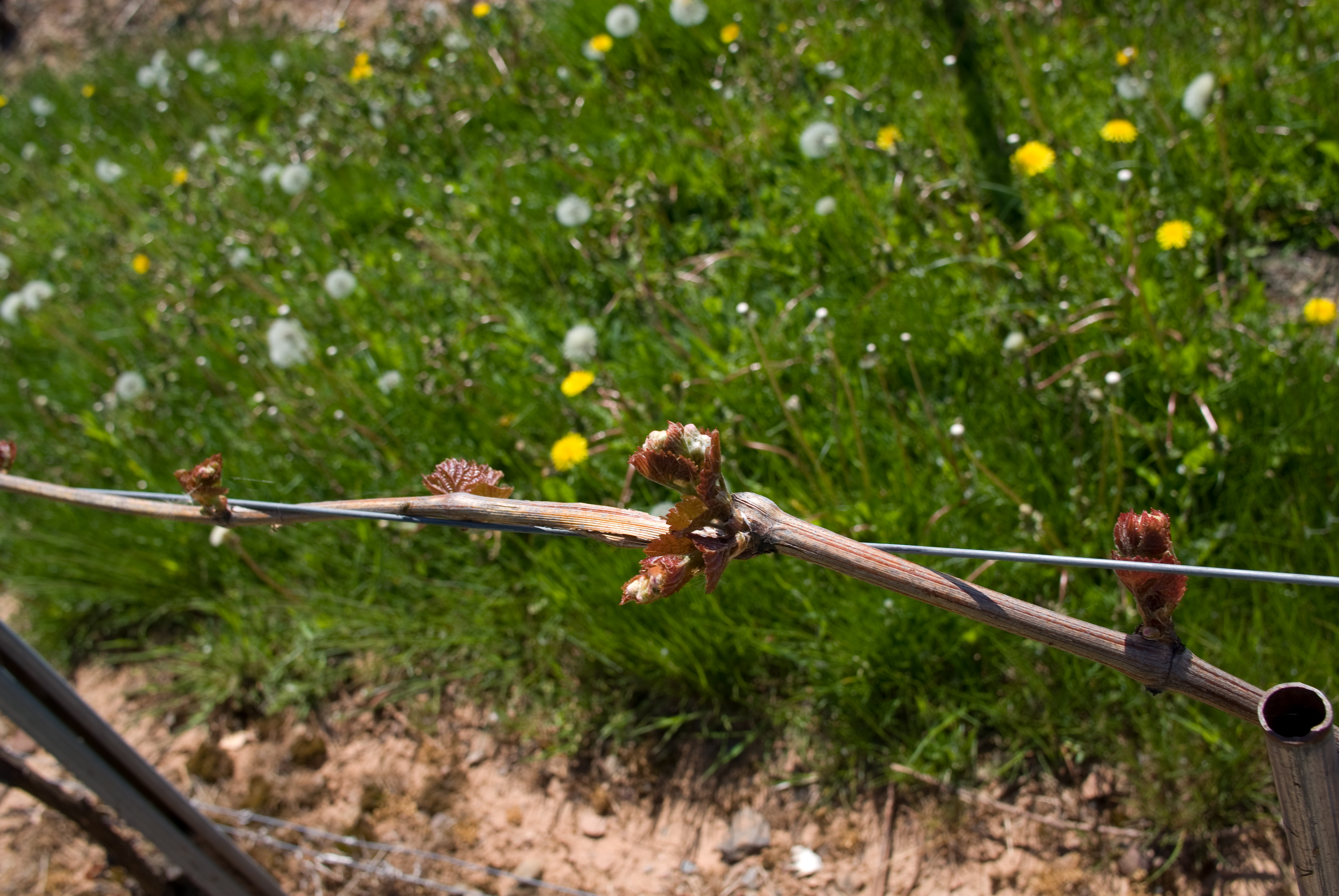
L'Acadie blanc at budbreak.

L'Acadie blanc is a very cold hardy vine able to withstand temperatures as low as −22 °C (−8 °F) to −25 °C (−13 °F), making it much hardier than the more widely planted Seyval blanc. The vine is an early to mid-ripening grape that has to the potential to be very productive and high yielding if not kept in check by winter pruning and later seasonal green harvesting. L'Acadie blanc tends to produce loose bunches which gives it some protection towards the viticultural hazard of botrytis bunch rot. There have been successes growing certified organically.

== Wine regions ==
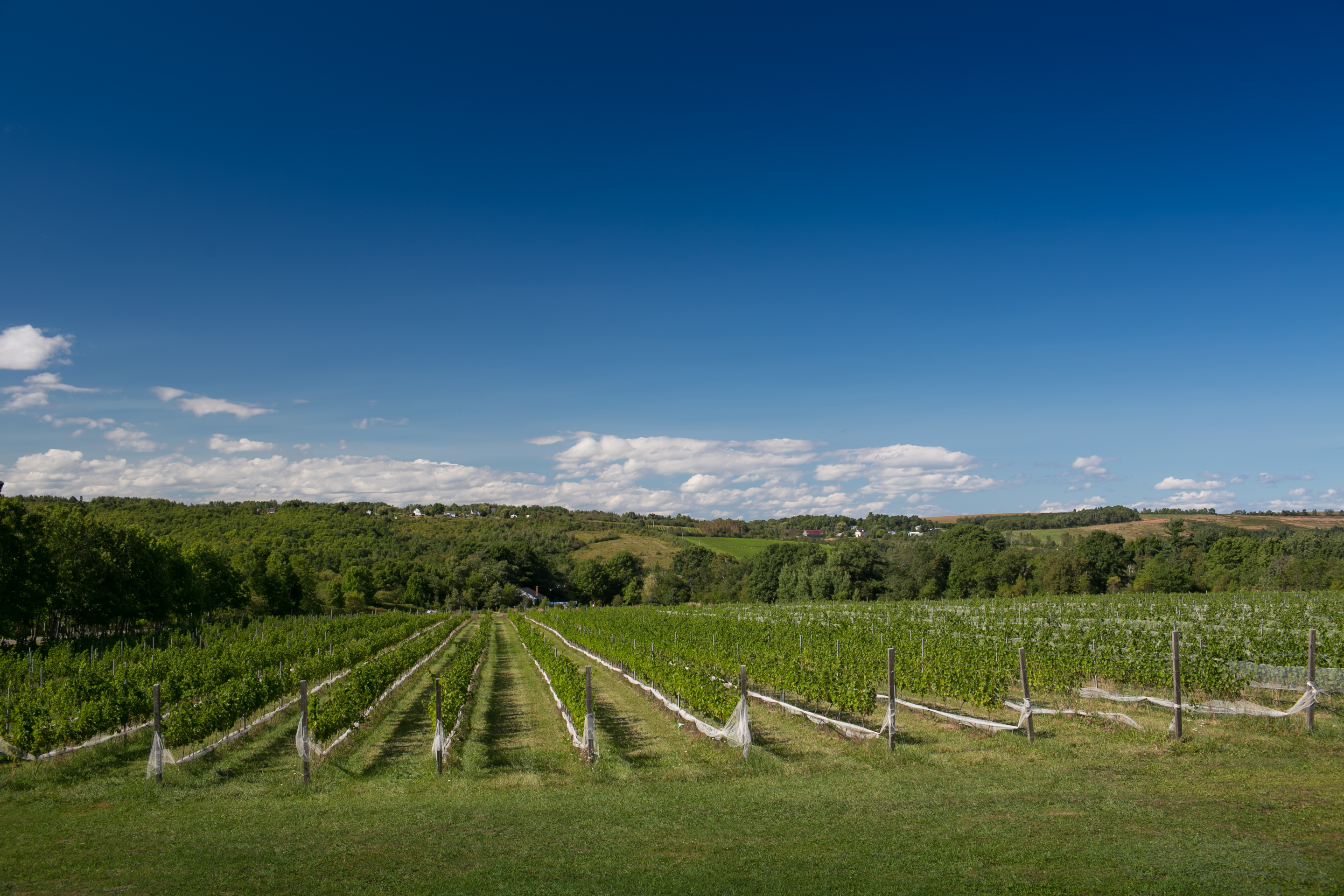
A Nova Scotia vineyard planted with L'Acadie blanc.

L'Acadie blanc is most widely planted in Nova Scotia where its cold hardiness is valued. Other plantings exist in north-central Ontario and Quebec where the grape's strong disease resistance makes it a promising planting. In Quebec some of the warmer southern regions of the province tend to produce styles lacking acidity while Québécois plantings in cooler areas have been increasing.

== Styles ==
While L'Acadie blanc is made in a varietal style it is often with other white grape varieties including Seyval blanc, Vandal-Cliche and Vidal blanc. Some wineries are producing traditional method sparkling styles. According to Master of Wine Jancis Robinson, varietal styles of L'Acadie blanc tend to be more full bodied than other Canadian whites with floral and honeyed aroma notes.

== Synonyms ==
As a relatively recently created hybrid, L'Acadie blanc does not have many synonyms with only Acadie, L'Acadie, La'Cadie, L. Acadie blanc, V 53261 and Vineland 53261 generally recognized.
