= New Hampshire wine =

Wine from New Hampshire

Coordinates: 42°51′48″N 71°10′31″W

New Hampshire
- Wine region
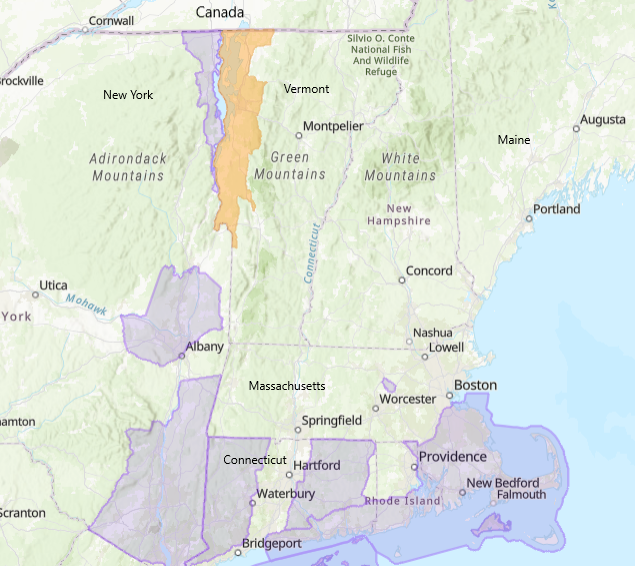
- New England AVAs
- Official name: State of New Hampshire
- Other names: Granite State, White Mountain State
- Type: U.S. State Appellation
- Year established: 1788
- Years of wine industry: 57
- Country: United States
- Growing season: 135 days
- Climate region: Region Ia-II
- Heat units: 1,200-2,400 GDD units
- Precipitation (annual average): 41.2 to 50.7 in (1,046–1,288 mm)
- Total area: 5.7 million acres (8,953 sq mi)
- Size of planted vineyards: 44 acres (18 ha)
- No. of vineyards: 26
- Grapes produced: Alden, Aurore, Cayuga, Chancellor, Chardonnay, De Chaunac, Diamond, Frontenac, La Crescent, La Crosse, Leon Millot, Marechal Foch, Niagara, Noiret, Riesling, Seyval blanc, Vidal blanc, Vignoles
- No. of wineries: 60

New Hampshire wine refers to wine made from grapes grown in the U.S. state of New Hampshire. Viticulture activity has existed in the state since the 1960s, however, as of 2026, there are no American Viticultural Areas (AVA) within its borders. Regardless, the state boasts more than 60 wineries producing various wines to sample and opportunities to learn about the wine-making process and its history in the Granite State.

== History ==
Viticulture was unknown in New Hampshire until 1965 when John and Lucille Canepa planted 800 French hybrid vines and 1,000 more the following year on their Governor's Island property in Lake Winnipesaukee. The Canepas bought a farm near Belmont in 1968 and bonded their White Mountain Vineyards in time for the crush in 1969.
In 1967 the Grape Growers Association of New Hampshire was formed with John Canepa as chairman, and by the early 1970s approximately 200 acres (81 ha) of French hybrids were being grown in the state. The Canepas eventually contracted for 150 acres (61 ha) of grapes from 26 growers. New Hampshire viticulture industry began in 1994 when two wineries, Jewell Towne Vineyards and Flag Hill Winery both produced their first vintages from locally grown grapes. Candia Vineyards started their test plantings in 1992 and full planting in 1998. New Hampshire continues to be a growing wine-producing state, with new commercial wineries opening.

== Terroir ==
New Hampshire’s terroir and stunning landscapes promotes the states's enotourism exploring wineries attractive. Various vintages from the Seacoast to the Great North Woods. Portsmouth, Lincoln, and Derry area in the southeastern corner of the state are produced where the most famous vineyards are located. The USDA plant hardiness zones range from 3b to 6b.

== See also ==
- American wine
- List of wineries in New England
