= Flag Hill =

Flag Hill may refer to:

- Flag Hill (Great Falls, Montana)
- Flag Hill (Houtman Abrolhos)
- Flag Hill Winery
- Bukit Bendera at the Garuda Palace in Indonesia
