= Landal noir =

Variety of grape

Landal noir is a red hybrid grape variety that was created during a series of trials between 1929 and 1942 by French grape breeder Pierre Landot at his Conzieu nursery in the Ain department of eastern France. The grape is a crossing of two Seibel grapes, Plantet and Seibel 8216. While authorized for use in several French wine growing region, the grape is officially not recommended for use in any quality wine production in France with only 49 hectares (120 acres) of the variety reported in 2008. Outside France, some plantings of Landal noir can be found in Switzerland, Canada and the United States.

== History and pedigree ==
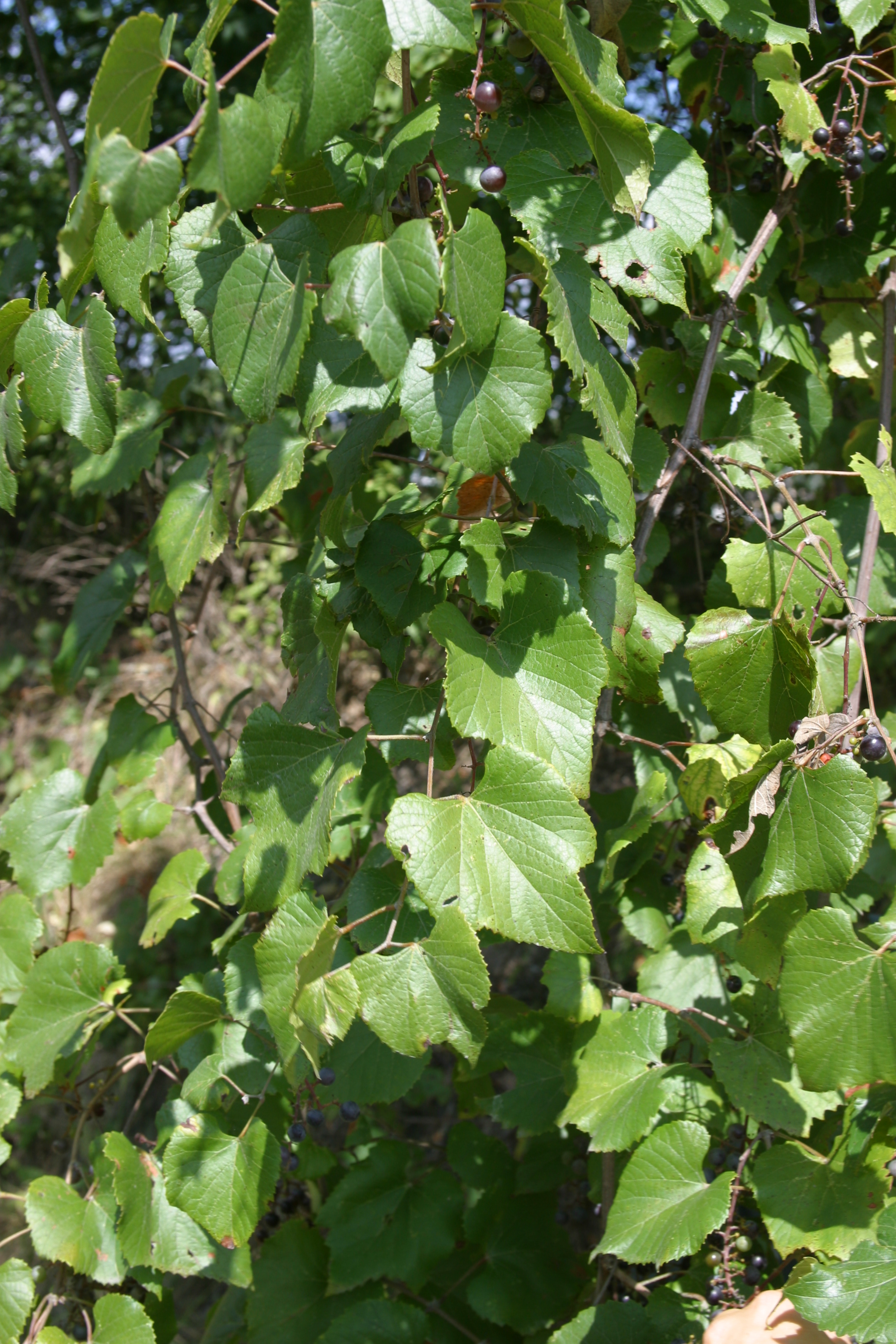
As a complex hybrid, Landal noir inherited genes from several Vitis vine varieties including Vitis berlandieri.

Landal noir was created during a series of trials between 1929 and 1942 at Pierre Landot's Ain nursery in the commune of Conzieu. The grape is a complex hybrid with a lineage that includes members of several species of the genus Vitis beginning with its parent varieties, the Seibel grapes Plantet (Seibel 5455) and Seibel 8216.

From its parent Plantet (a Seibel 4461 x Berlandieri crossing), Landal noir inherited genes from the Vitis berlandieri, Vitis vinifera (through great-grand parent Bourboulenc and great-great grandparent Aramon), Vitis aestivalis, Vitis cinerea and Vitis rupestris species.

From parent Seibel 8216 (a Seibel 5410 x Florental crossing), Landal noir is related to several other Seibel grape varieties including Cinsaut Seibel (Seibel 2510) and Seibel 867 (a crossing of Noah and Vivarais).

== Viticulture ==
Landal noir is an early ripening and early budding grape variety that is very winter hardy and is able to withstand cold temperatures and spring frosts. Unlike many other hybrid varieties and despite having genes from several native North American vine species in its lineage, Landal noir is still susceptible to the viticultural hazard of phylloxera which means that plantings of the grape need to be grafted onto resistant rootstock.

The vine tends to be very vigorous, producing a large canopy, and fertile, capable of producing high yields of small clusters of similarly small berries.

== Wine regions ==
The Vendée of western France where some plantings of Landal noir are still cultivated.

While Landal noir is still an authorized grape variety for several French wine regions (none of which is making Appellation d'origine contrôlée (AOC) wines which is prohibited from using hybrid grapes under French wine laws), the variety is not officially recommended for use in any quality wine production. Plantings of the grape have been steadily declining for decades with only 49 hectares (120 acres) reported in 2008, mostly concentrated in the Loire Valley and Vendée department.

Outside France there were 0.06 hectares (0.15 acres) of Landal noir planted in the Canton of Geneva in Switzerland. In North America, the grape was first planted in Ontario during the 1980s with small plantings still there and in Quebec. In Pennsylvania, the grape is often used as a blending variety with the French-American hybrid grape Chambourcin.

== Synonyms ==
The only official synonym for Landal noir listed in the Vitis International Variety Catalogue (VIVC) is its breeder code of Landot 244.
