= Winter grape =

Winter grape is a common name which may refer to any of the following species of grapevine:

- Vitis cinerea (also called graybark grape)
- Vitis vulpina (also called "frost grape")
