= Flag Hill Winery =

Winery in New Hampshire USA

Coordinates: 43°04′57″N 71°01′40″W

Flag Hill Distillery & Winery
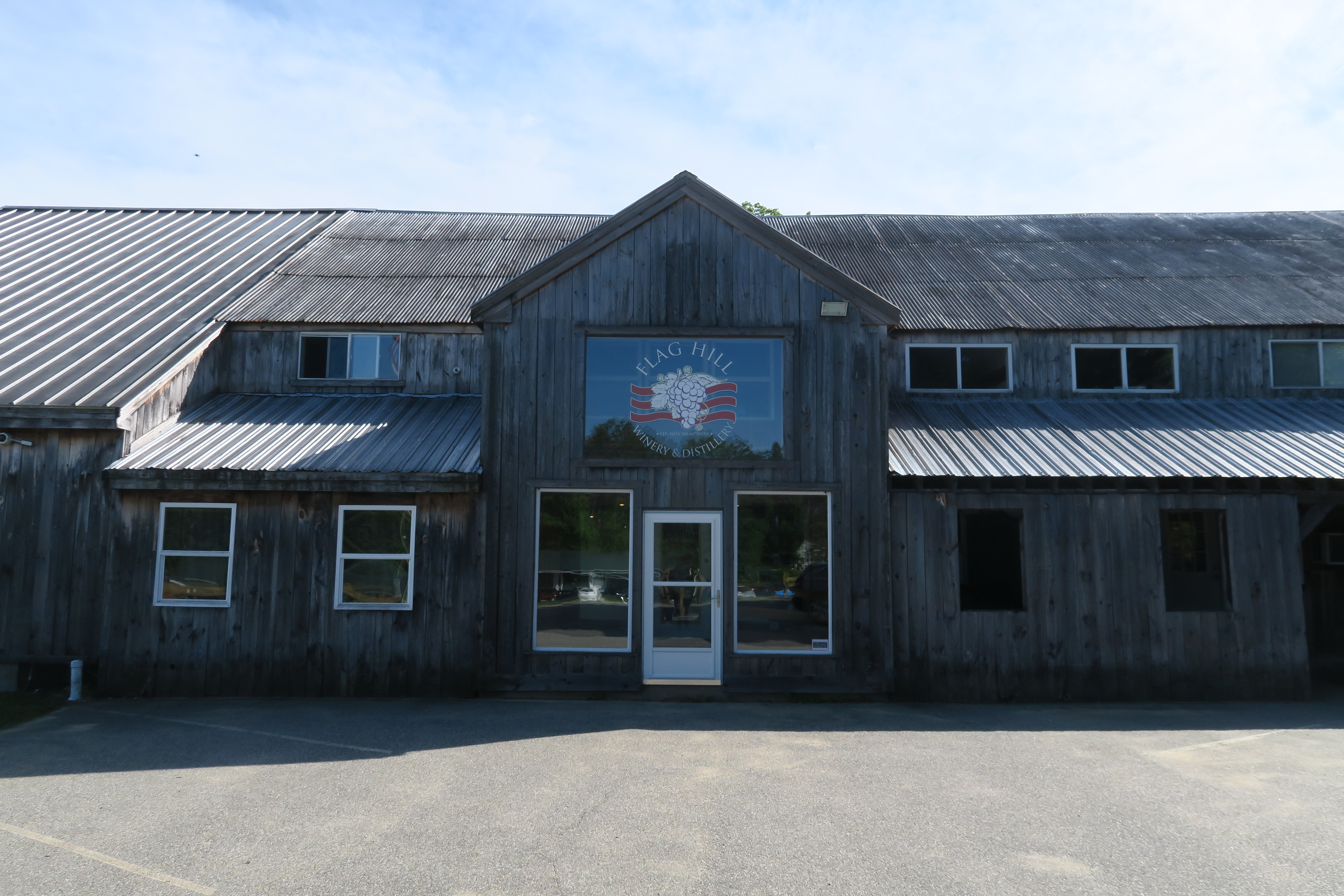
- Flag Hill Winery
- Location: Lee, New Hampshire, USA
- Founded: 1990
- First vintage: 1994; 31 years ago
- Key people: Brian Ferguson - Distiller/ Winemaker
- Known for: Cayuga
- Varietals: La Cresant, Marechal Foch, Niagara (grape)
- Other products: General John Stark Vodka, Josiah Bartlett Apple Brandy, Karner Blue Gin, Flag Hill Rum (white and spiced), sugar maple liqueur
- Distribution: NH, MA, VT, NY, RI
- Tasting: Open to public 11-5 pm daily
- Website: www.flaghill.com

Flag Hill Distillery & Winery is located in Lee, New Hampshire, United States. It is the largest vineyard in the state. Flag Hill was the first legal distillery in New Hampshire after Prohibition.

== History ==
The land where Flag Hill is located has been farmed since the 18th century, and was formerly a dairy farm. Frank Reinhold Sr. bought 180 acres (0.73 km^{2}) in the area in 1950, and in 1985 his son Frank Reinhold Jr. took over the property with the hope of growing grapes, which he began planting in 1990. The first harvest took place in 1994 and was released in 1996, with the production of 500 cases of wine.

Flag Hill winery was the second winery to open in New Hampshire, preceded only by Jewell Towne Vineyards.

A barn dating to the late 18th century hosts the winery and tasting room. There are 21 acres (85,000 m^{2}) of vineyards, and the winery produced about 4,000 cases of wine annually as of 2011, as well as 2,000 cases of liquor at its distillery.

The winery grows French-American hybrids such as De Chaunac, Marechal Foch and Vignoles, as well as American hybrids such as Cayuga White and La Crescent. These varietals are more resistant to New England's cold winters than most other varietals.

== See also ==
- New Hampshire wine
