= Gaspereau, Nova Scotia =

Community in Nova Scotia, Canada

Coordinates: 45°3′57.51″N 64°21′9.01″W

Gaspereau in Nova Scotia

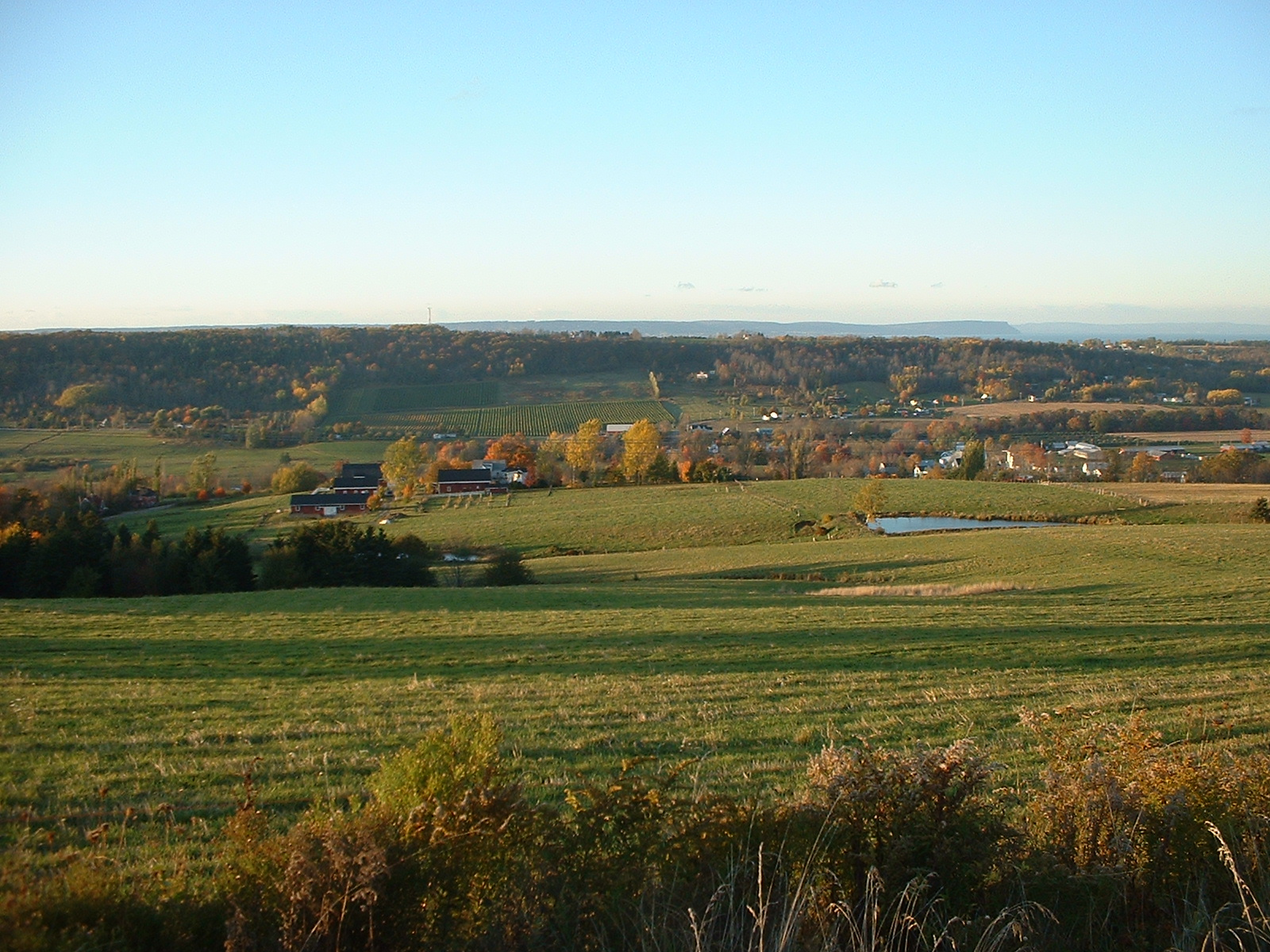
View of Gaspereau Valley from the south slope

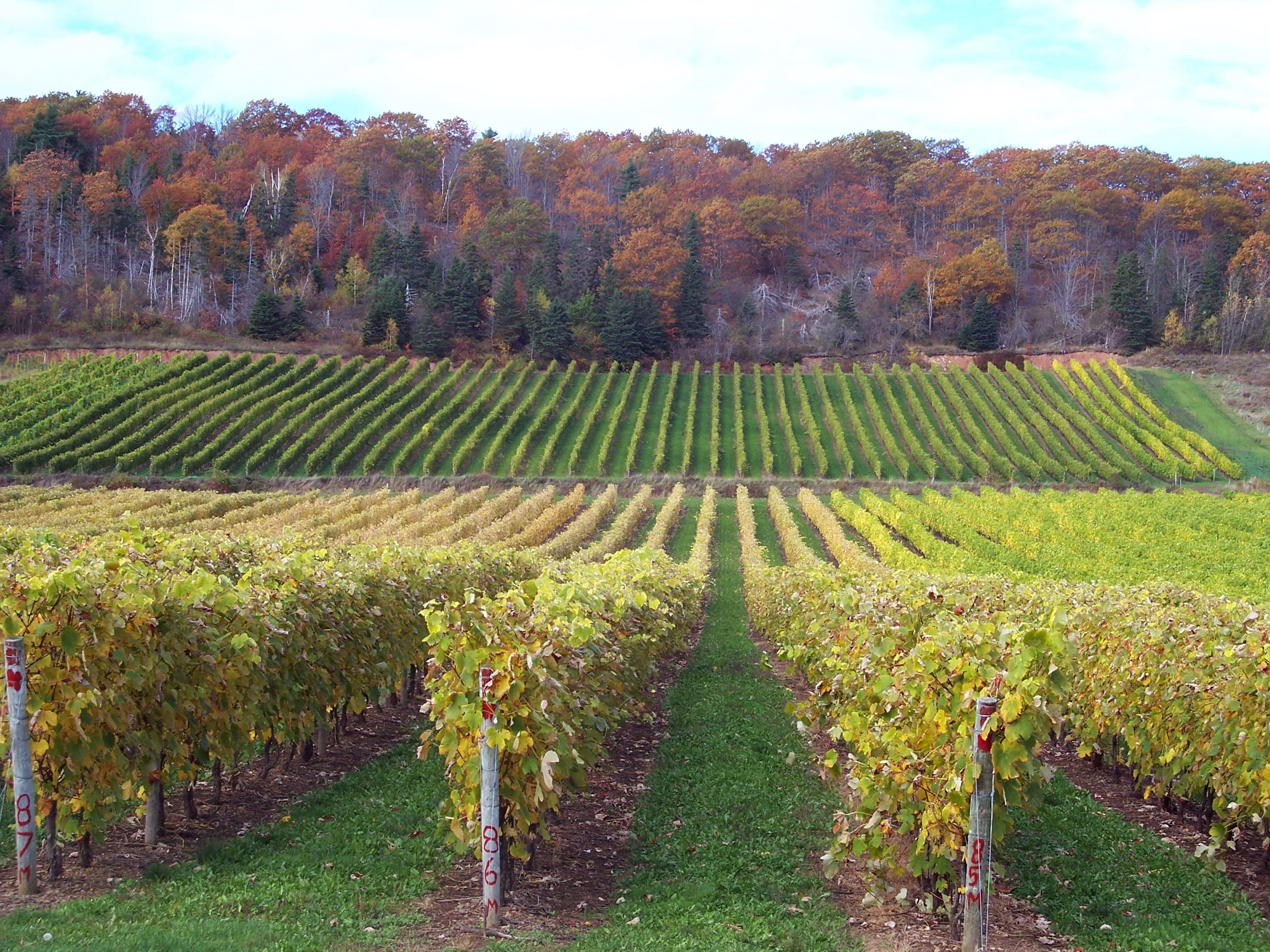
Gaspereau Vineyards, NS

Gaspereau is a rural community in the Canadian province of Nova Scotia, located in Kings County.

It is located about 3 km south of the town of Wolfville on the Gaspereau River. The name "Gaspereau" is often used to refer to all of the communities along the 15 km Gaspereau Valley which include Gaspereau, Wallbrook, Melanson and White Rock.

The name is derived from the Gaspereau fish, Alosa pseudoharengus, which migrates up the river every spring. The fishing of Gaspereau has been important to human settlement of the Gaspereau Valley for thousands of years. When the Acadians came here around 1680, they named the fish and the area "Gasparot". There is still a commercial fishery for Gaspereau in the river.

The term "Rivière des Gasparots" is mentioned in a 1701 census of Acadia.

Gaspereau is primarily an agricultural community, hosting dairy farms and apple orchards. In recent years many grape vineyards have been established and there is more than one winery in the village. Gaspereau Vineyards, opened in 2004, and L'Acadie Vineyards, opened in 2008, are both popular destinations in the village of Gaspereau.

The Gaspereau River is also known for tubing. During the hot summer months residents and visitors float on inner-tubes down through lush, tranquil river scenery when the river is high. Visitors can often rent tubes from nearby houses, but they should also be aware that the river is part of nature, not a theme-park: depending on the activity of the hydro dam that controls water levels and flow in the river there can be areas of powerful flow, overhanging obstacles or protruding rocks. Non-swimmers should wear life jackets and be in the company of competent swimmers.

Gaspereau is also home to a canal (referred to as "The Canal" or "The Gaspereau Canal" or "White Rock Canal"). The 1.5 km long canal brings water from the White Rock reservoir to the hydroelectricity generating station.
