= Quebec cider =

Alcoholic drink from Canada

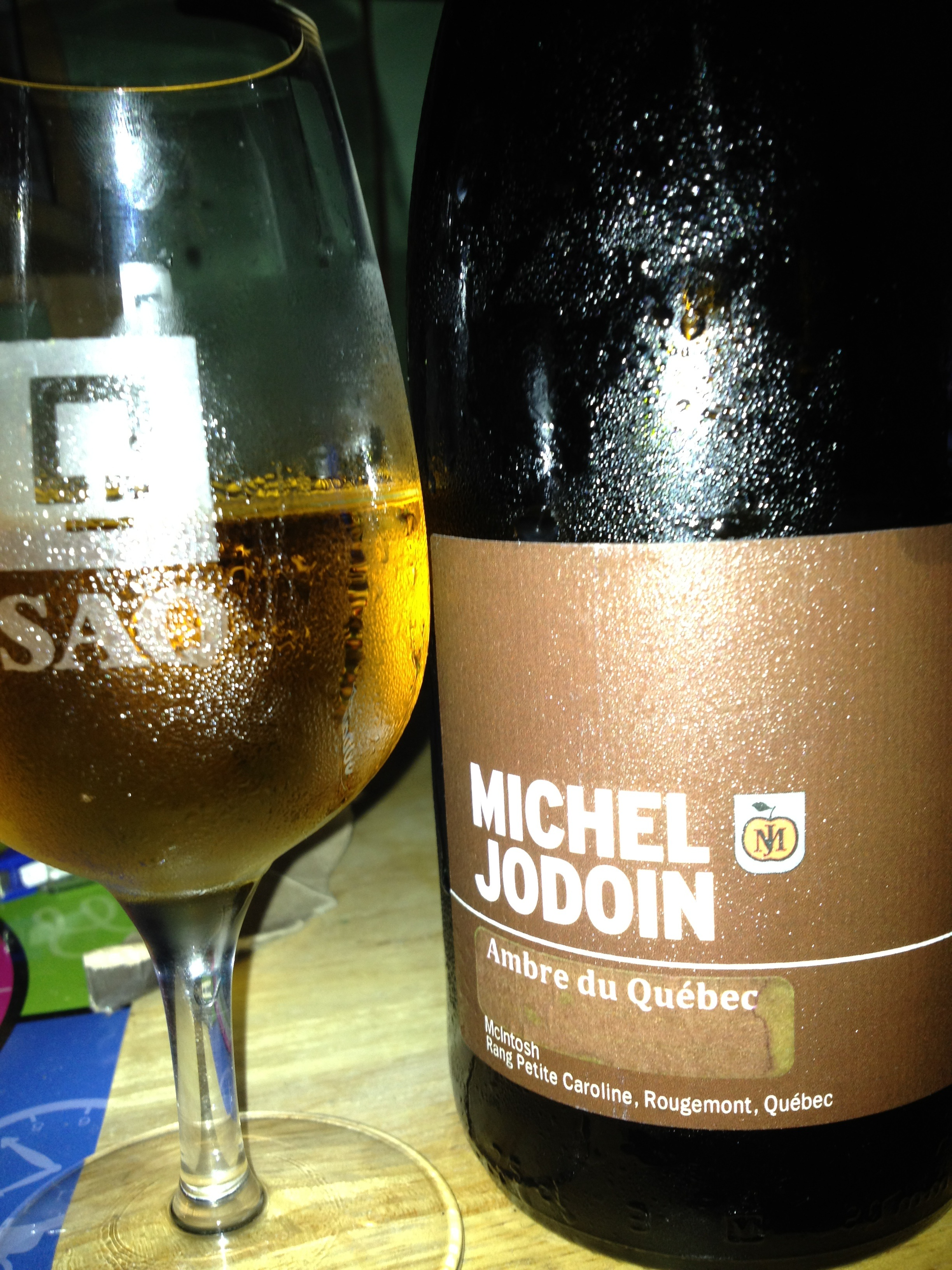
- Origin: Canada
- Colour: Yellow

Quebec cider (also known as cidre du Québec in French) is crafted in the apple-producing regions of Montérégie, Eastern Townships, Chaudière-Appalaches, the Laurentides, Charlevoix and Capitale-Nationale, in Canada. The revival of cider is a relatively new phenomenon, since Quebec's alcohol regulating body, the Régie des alcools, des courses et des jeux began issuing permits to produce craft cider only in 1988. In 2008, some 40 cider makers were producing more than 100 apple-based alcoholic beverages.

In addition to alcoholic varieties, Quebec has a robust tradition of non-alcoholic apple juice production. Unlike in the United States, where “apple cider” may refer to both alcoholic and non-alcoholic unfiltered juice, Quebec’s non-alcoholic equivalent is simply called jus de pomme (apple juice), though it is typically cloudy and unfiltered rather than clear. This distinctive style is widely available at farmers’ markets and orchards during the fall, and is popular among both locals and visitors.

== History ==
The honour of planting the first apple tree in the history of Quebec goes to Louis Hébert, apothecary from Paris and New France's first settler. He did so around 1617 on the site where Quebec City was founded in 1608. A good number of the first French settlers to the colony were Normans who brought over the apple cider craft. Sizable orchards developed in the region of New France, particularly on Île d'Orléans.

The Sulpicians, who settled on the Island of Montreal in 1657, possessed, beginning in 1666, a little orchard inside the fenced garden of the seminary on Notre-Dame Street. A bigger orchard was planted on the side of Mount Royal, in the mid-1670s. On this site, the mission de la Montagne where Marguerite Bourgeoys had her school, they erected a fort, in 1685, where they were using two cider presses. In 1705, the production of cider was about 30 barrels, and part was sold outside the religious community.

In 1731, the orchards covered 90 arpents (76.0 acres) on the Island of Montreal, on the side of the mountain and around town. From 1731 to 1781, the surface area occupied by the orchards rose from 90 to 402 arpents (0.31 to 1.37 km^{2}). The common cultivars at the time were the Calville blanc, Calville rouge, Famous, Reinette, Bourassa, Pomme blanche, Pomme grise of Montreal and Sauvageon. These cultivars have been supplanted by others since.

The British Conquest of 1760, confirmed by the cession of 1763, brought along all kinds of changes in the habits of French Canadians. Great Britain's protectionist trade policy, limiting exchanges within the British Empire, favoured the importation of alcohols from England (whisky, gin) and Antilles (rum), and discouraged all the artisanal productions of the inhabitants. Only beer, produced by industrialists from Great Britain (or of British origin), expanded significantly in the 19th century.

On August 15, 1807, in Le Canadien of Quebec City, there was an article in which the author deplored that more efforts were not made to encourage the cultivation of apples on Île d'Orléans and to export cider, which he judged "superior or at least equal to that of Europe and the United States". He suggested also that the production could serve to diminish the excessive consumption of rum, a "source of disastrous ruins in a lot of families."

The artisanal production of cider continued until the period of prohibition on alcohol in the middle of the 1910s. In April 1919, a great majority of Quebecers (78.62%) voted yes in a Quebec referendum asking them if "beer, ciders, and light wines" should be allowed, as excluded from the list of prohibited alcoholic beverages. However, in 1920, a legislative omission rendered cider illegal in the territory of Quebec. Indeed, the Canadian Alcoholic Beverages Act which ended prohibition and created the monopoly of the Commission des liqueurs du Québec, did not legislate on cider, which consequently found itself in a judicial void. It was only in 1970, half a century later, that the situation was corrected. During this period, cider continued to be produced by several apple growers, but they were not legally permitted to sell it.

When cider became legal again, Quebecers were served a cider produced industrially, which was disliked very much by many and gave it a bad reputation. Makers were unable to supply to the demand and inundated the market with products that had no maturity. A whole generation experienced the Grand Sec d'Orléans, which to many, evoked what is most undrinkable when it comes to alcohol. Sales declined after a few years, and cider, barely gotten out of its "dark age", was plunged back into it. From about 1,000,000 imperial gallons (4,500,000 L; 1,200,000 US gal) a year in 1971, the production dropped to 300,000 imperial gallons (1,400,000 L; 360,000 US gal) per year in 1982. It was only at the end of the 1980s when the first craft production permits were issued by the Régie des alcools, des courses et des jeux du Québec, that Quebec cider was truly reborn, about the same time as beer and wine, for the same reason.

The ciders crafted by small cider makers then multiplied, often avoiding to use the word cidre on the bottle to avoid alarming the consumers. The first Quebec ice cider was crafted by Christian Barthomeuf in Dunham in the Eastern Townships during the winter of 1989–1990. The first bottles bear the "1990" millésime. Ten years later, cider makers obtained the authorization to name their products cidre de glace (ice cider). A regulation on cider was finally adopted by the National Assembly of Quebec in November 2008.

== Types ==
Quebec cider makers prepare various types of ciders, which are categorized according to the production method, the percentage of alcohol, the effervescence, or the residual sugar content.

Cider is said to be light when it contains 7% of alcohol or less, strong when it contains 7% to 13%, and apéritif when between 13% and 20%. Flavoured cider, perfumed with aromas of berries, honey or maple, generally contains less than 10% alcohol.

As it is with wine, cider can be still (without bubble) or sparkling (with bubbles).

Sparkling apple cider is crafted either by injecting carbon dioxide, in closed vats using the Charmat process or the traditional champenoise method. The result is a cider said to be semi-sparkling when in impregnated naturally with carbon dioxide, under low pressure (less than 2 standard atmospheres (200 kPa)), carbonated semi-sparkling when impregnated artificially with carbon dioxide, also under low pressure. It is sparkling when impregnated naturally with carbon dioxide under a pressure between 3 and 5 standard atmospheres (300 and 510 kPa) and carbonated sparkling, if artificially impregnated with carbon dioxide under of the same pressure of 3 to 5 standard atmospheres (300 to 510 kPa).

Apple mistelle is a cider obtained from a must kept fresh, that is unfermented, to which alcohol is added.

Ice cider, an innovation from Quebec, is crafted by pressing apples naturally frozen by winter's cold. Similar to the late harvest of grapes, apples picked during winter allow for a must with a high sugar content, when water, turned into ice, is separated from the apples. This step is called the cryoconcentration of sugar. The final result, after the fermentation of the must, is a liqueur-like and mellow liquid, containing between 9 and 13% of alcohol.

== Regions ==
Quebec counts six cider-producing regions, which correspond more or less with its apple-producing regions: the Montérégie, Eastern Townships, Chaudière-Appalaches, the Laurentides, Charlevoix, and Capitale-Nationale.

== Apples ==
Cultivation of apples is well developed in Quebec, which produces in quantity several cultivars of apples, the McIntosh, Paula Red, Spartan, Cortland, Empire, Vista Bella and Jersey Mac being among the most common.

== See also ==
- Cuisine of Quebec
- Quebec beer
- Quebec wine
