= Seyval noir =

Variety of grape

Seyval noir (French pronunciation: [sɛval nwaʁ]) is a red hybrid grape variety that was created in the late 19th century by French horticulturalist Bertille Seyve and his father-in-law Victor Villard from a crossing of two Seibel grapes (Rayon d'Or and Seibel 5656). The pair used the same two varieties to create the white wine grape Seyval blanc, making the two siblings rather than color mutations of one or the other. The name Seyval comes from a combination of the two men's names.

Unlike Seyval blanc, Seyval noir is not widely planted with only a few producers cultivating the grape in the Canadian wine region of Quebec and some experimental plantings in the Jura wine region of eastern France.

== History and pedigree ==
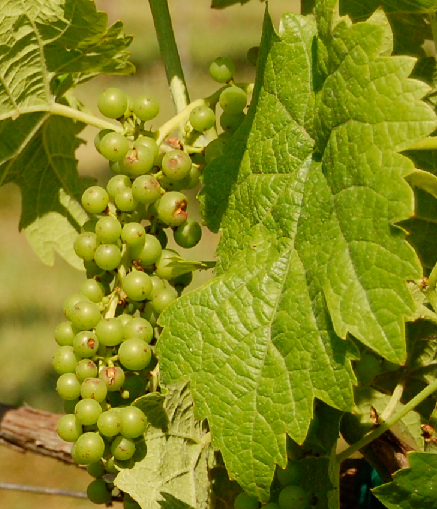
Seyval noir and Seyval blanc (pictured) share the same parentage, making them siblings rather than one being a color mutation of the other.

Seyval noir was created by French grape breeders Bertille Seyve and Victor Villard at their Saint-Vallier vineyard and nursery in the Isère department of eastern France. The grape is a crossing of two Seibel grape varieties (Rayon d'Or and Seibel 5656) produced by French grape breeder Albert Seibel. This parentage makes Seyval noir a complex hybrid, meaning that within its pedigree are genes from several Vitis species. The same crossing was used to make the white wine grape Seyval blanc, making the two varieties siblings rather than color mutations of one or the other.

From its parents, Rayon d'Or (a crossing of Aramon du Gard and Seibel 405) and Seibel 5656 (a crossing of Seibel 4595 and Seibel 4199), Seyval noir has Vitis vinifera, Vitis rupestris and Vitis aestivalis genes in lineage.

== Viticulture ==
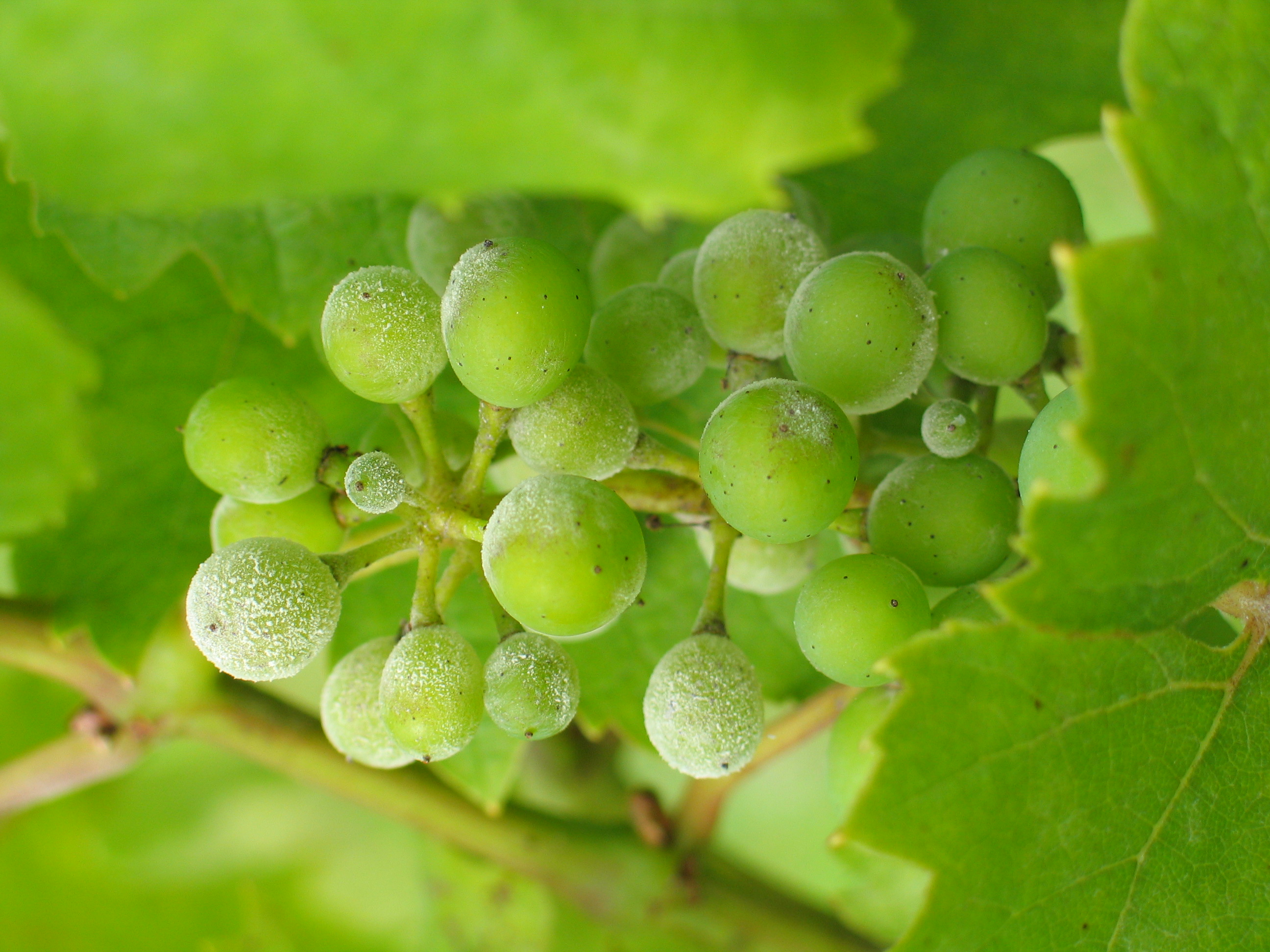
Seyval noir grapes are susceptible to fungal infections from Uncinula necator (pictured) which causes powdery mildew on grapes.

Seyval noir is moderately winter-hardy vine which is able to survive the cold winters and late springs of Quebec. The grape is also fairly resistant to most grape diseases but does have some susceptibility to powdery mildew.

== Wine regions ==
While Seyval noir was created in France, the grape is hardly planted here. It is not listed on the country's official registry of wine grape varieties nor is it permitted for use in any Appellation d'Origine Contrôlée (AOC) wines. Some experimental plantings of the grape do exist at Domaine Ganevat in the commune of Rotalier in the Jura wine region of eastern France where it is used in a blend for a nouveau table wine. Outside France the grape is planted to a limited extent in Quebec where it used for both red and rosé wines as well as vinegar production.

== Synonyms ==
As a relatively recently created hybrid, Seyval noir does not have many synonyms with only the breeding code Seyve-Villard 5247 generally recognized.
