= Gaspereau Vineyards =

Structures

Coordinates: 45.0664996°N 64.3611836°W

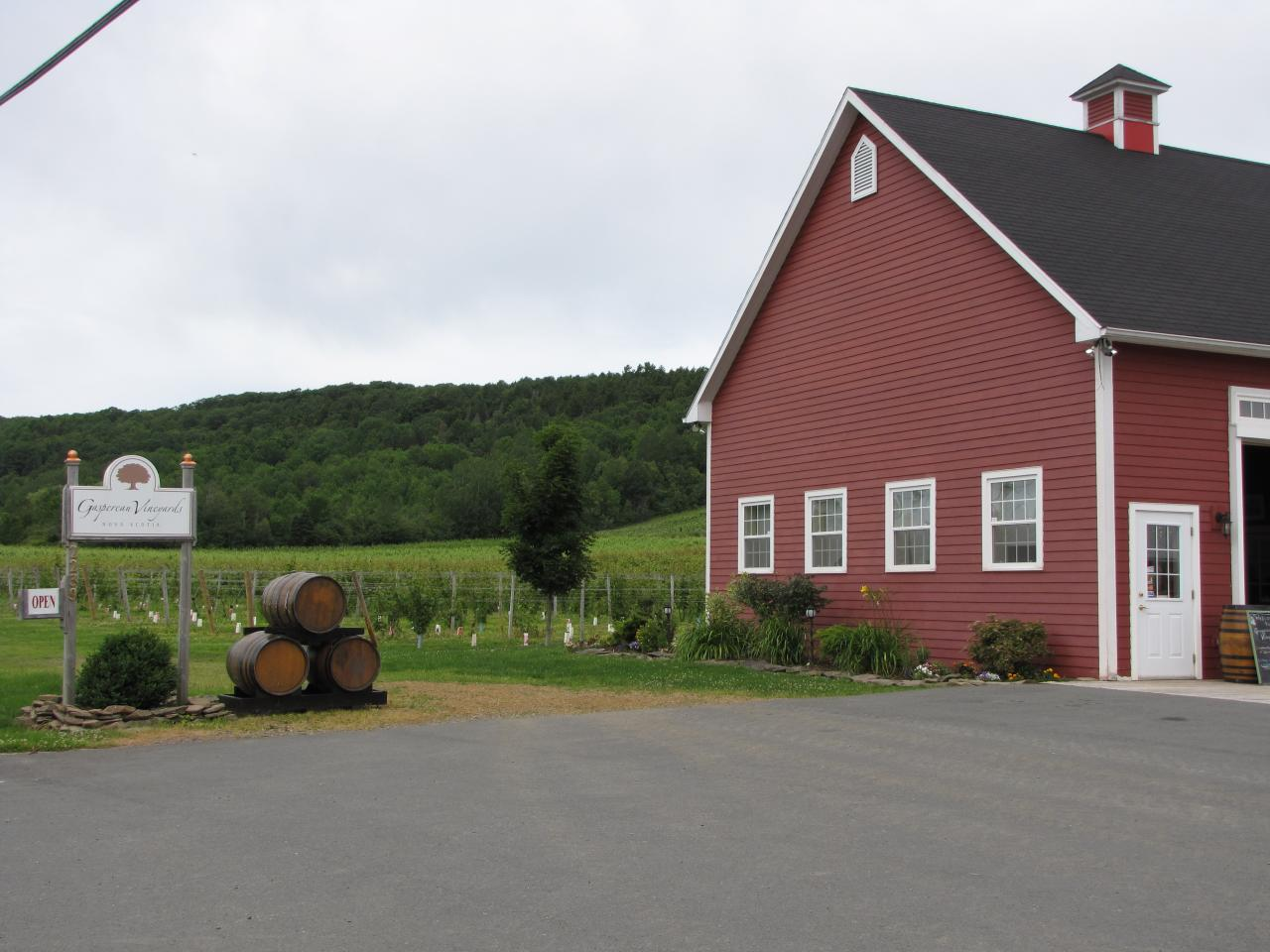
Gasperau Vineyards.

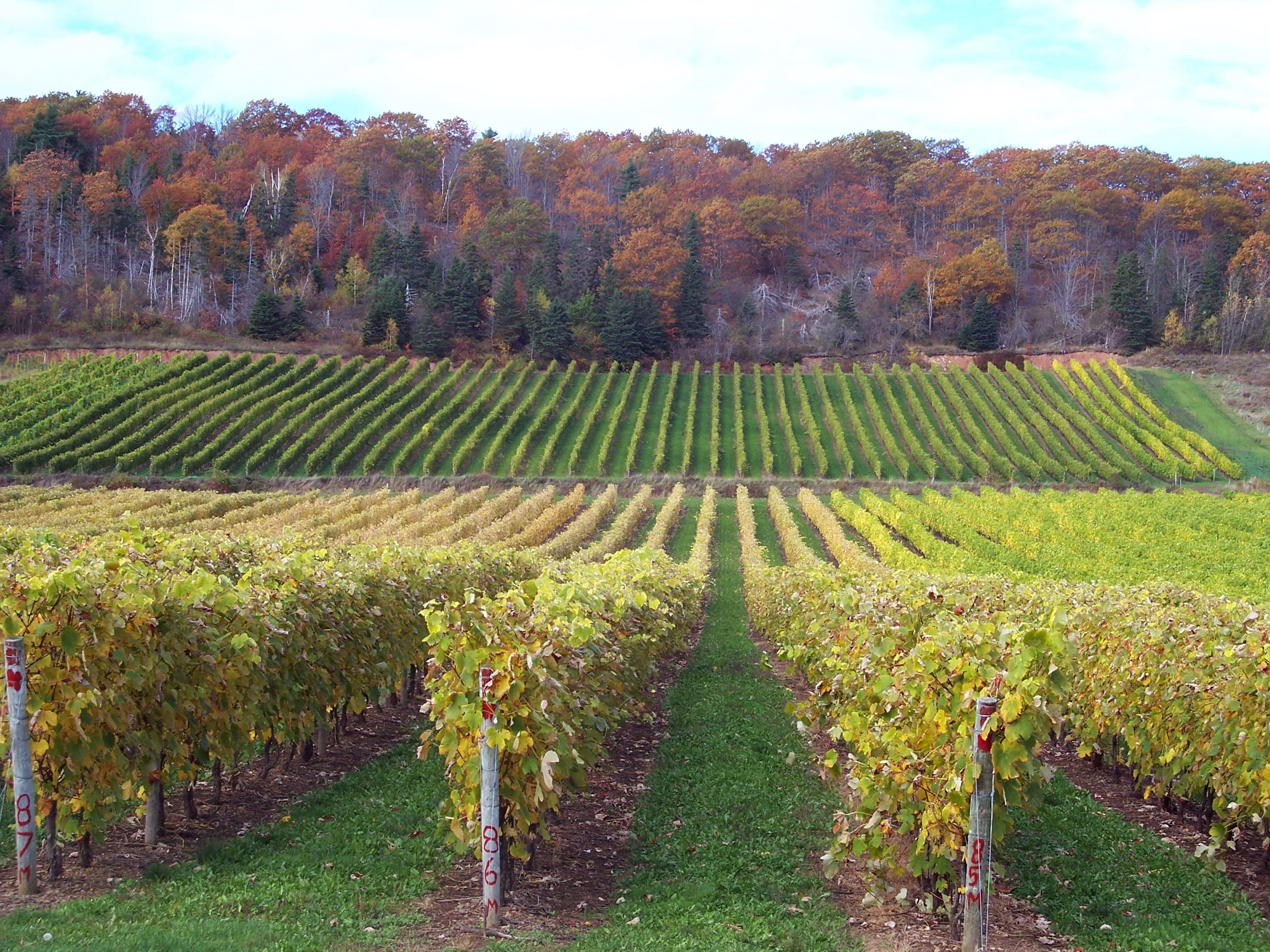
Gasperau Vineyards.

Gaspereau Vineyards is a small winery located in the Gaspereau River Valley of Nova Scotia run by Gina Haverstock. The vineyard encompasses 35 acres (140,000 m^{2}) and is 3 kilometres from downtown Wolfville. It is one of several wineries in Nova Scotia. The winery produces a number of red and white wines, available in dry, off dry, and semi dry. Additionally, icewine and maple wine are made. In 2020 they won a Lieutenant Governor's Award for Excellence in Nova Scotia Wines.

== History ==
Once the site of an apple orchard & cattle farm, the vineyard was planted in 1996 by Hans Jost of Jost Vineyards. It opened to the public in 2004.
