= Jewell Towne Vineyards =

Coordinates: 42°52′17.5″N 70°57′34.6″W

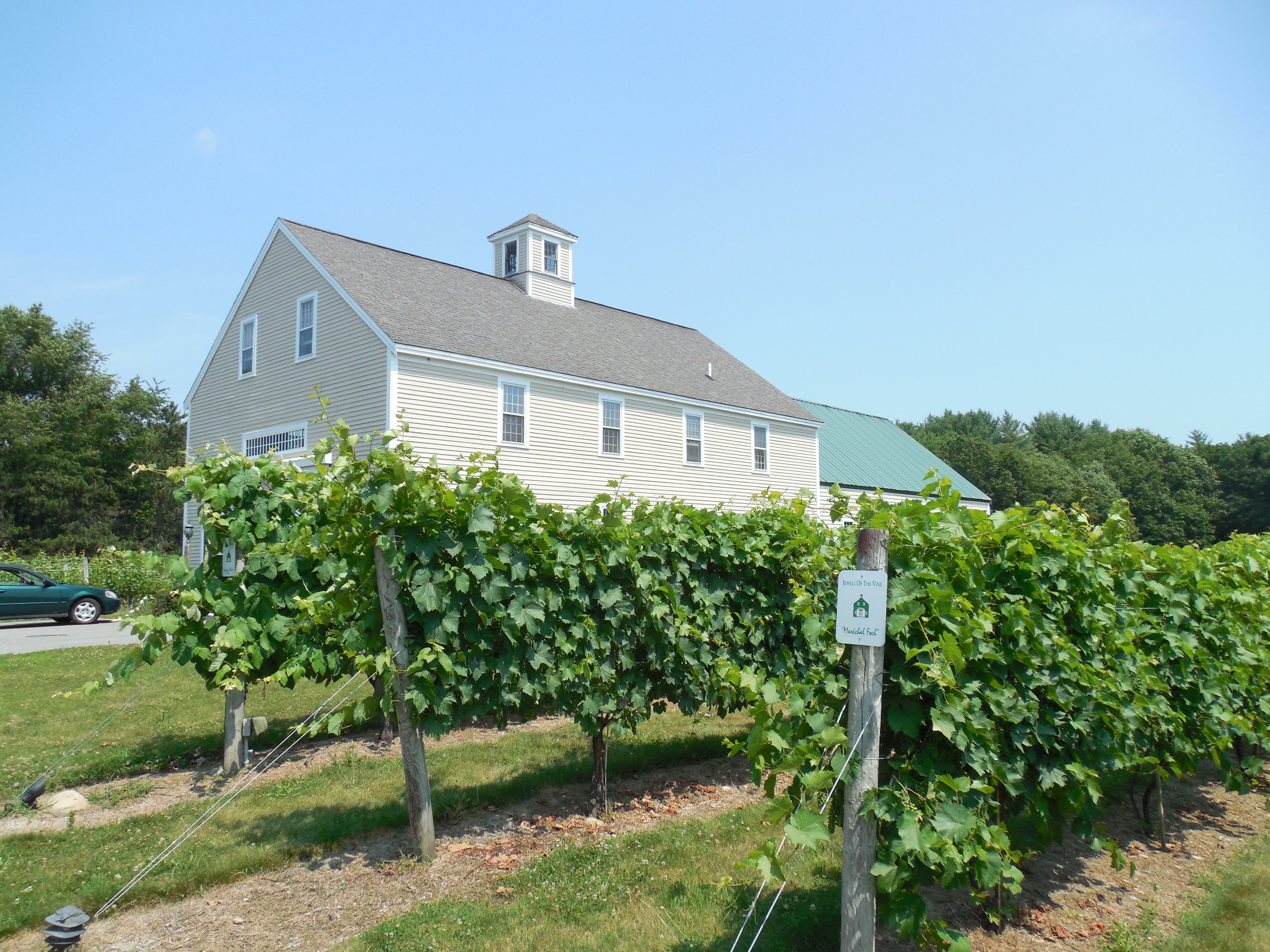
Jewell Towne Vineyards

Jewell Towne Vineyards is a winery in the state of New Hampshire. The property is located on the hills overlooking the Powwow River a few miles from the Atlantic Ocean. The property is the oldest currently producing winery in New Hampshire, and is seen as a leader in establishing northern New England cold hardy cultivars.

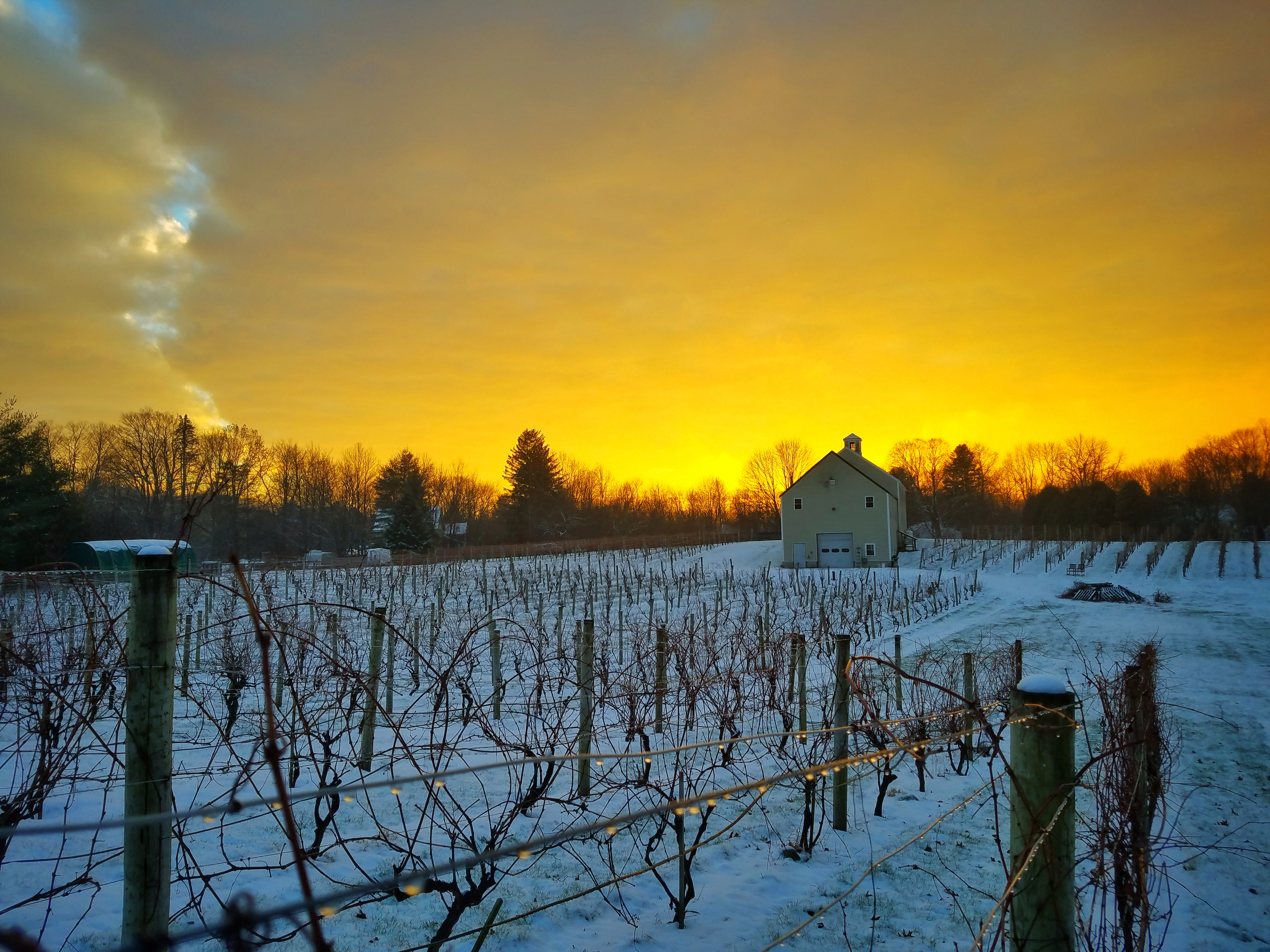
The sun setting over Jewell Towne Vineyards on a winter evening. The varietals in the vineyard are unaffected by winter snows.

== History ==
In 1982 Peter Oldak of South Hampton, New Hampshire, a former emergency room physician, planted six grapevines in his backyard to complement his small garden and orchard. With time he concluded the microclimate of his 13 acres (5.3 ha) property was very similar to that of the Finger Lakes region of New York and was well suited to growing grapes, despite common misconceptions.

In 1994 Jewell Towne Vineyards became a licensed commercial enterprise, and the first 40 cases were released. Having made the wine in the Oldak home basement until 1996, the construction of a winery was completed in 1999, containing a wine cellar, bottling room, a large tasting room and a balcony used as an art gallery to exhibit work from local artists.

Since 1994 Jewell Towne Vineyards wines have won an array of awards from national competitions and state fairs.

Oldak has also formed the New Hampshire Winery Association, aiming to support local vintners, and works with the University of New Hampshire teaching viticulture and winemaking.

In 2018, it was reported that Peter Oldak and his wife Brenda were going to stop producing wines and sell off their remaining stock so that they could go into retirement.

== Production ==
Initially experimenting with more than sixty grape varieties, the number was eventually reduced to approximately twenty of varieties deemed most promising by 1990. While a varied selection of grape varieties, there is an emphasis on cold hardy varieties, but also Vitis vinifera varieties, such as Chardonnay, Gewürztraminer and Riesling. Among the cultivated hybrids are Aurore, Seyval, Vidal blanc, Vignoles and Marechal Foch. Oldak has declared a mission to bring Landot noir back to respectability. The winery produces between 18 and 20 types of wine. In addition to red and white varietal wines, the winery produces blush and ice wines, and a "port" that is made from the Chancellor grape.

By the early 2000s, Jewell Towne produced 35,000 bottles a year, requiring more fruit than can possibly be cultivated on the 5-acre (2.0 ha) vineyard, and therefore imported roughly 70% of the grapes from New York and California. However, in 2010 they decreased the amount of wine produced so that they could use only fruit grown on the 5-acre property. As the state line dividing New Hampshire and Massachusetts runs through the property, some of the wines bear "New Hampshire 50% & Massachusetts 50%" on the label.
