= Climate of Nova Scotia =

Köppen climate types of Nova Scotia

Nova Scotia lies in the mid-temperate zone, and although the province is almost surrounded by water, the climate is closer to continental climate rather than maritime climate. The temperature extremes of the continental climate are moderated by the ocean.

Nova Scotia has frequent coastal fog and marked changeability of weather from day to day. The main factors influencing Nova Scotia's climate are:

- The effects of the westerly wind
- The interaction between three main air masses which converge on the east coast
- Nova Scotia's location on the routes of the major eastward-moving storms
- The moderating influence of the sea

Described on the provincial vehicle-licence plate as Canada's 'Ocean Playground', the sea is a major influence on Nova Scotia's climate. Nova Scotia's cold winters and warm summers are modified and generally moderated by ocean influences. The province is surrounded by four major bodies of water. These are the Gulf of Saint Lawrence to the north, the Bay of Fundy to the west, the Gulf of Maine to the southwest, and the Atlantic Ocean to the southeast.

== Temperature and precipitation ==
Temperature and precipitation vary marginally from one end of the province to the other, as illustrated by the following graphs. They show Yarmouth, Halifax, Sydney, and Kentville representing the southwestern, central, northeastern, and Annapolis Valley extremes, respectively. Temperatures at the southern end of the province are moderated by oceanic (Gulf Stream) currents, whereas the northern end is influenced by the colder waters of the Gulf of St. Lawrence. Though milder, and with less winter precipitation, the southwestern end has more fog. The Annapolis Valley has hotter, and humid summers, while also having cold snowy winters.

Yarmouth

Climate chart (precipitation, max. and min. temperature)
J	F	M	A	M	J	J	A	S	O	N	D
127 1 −7	102 1 −7	116 4 −3	101 9 1	101 14 6	95 18 10	88 21 13	84 21 13	95 18 10	112 13 6	139 9 2	132 4 −4
- █ Average max. and min. temperatures in °C
- █ Precipitation totals in mm
- Source: Environment Canada
Imperial conversion
J	F	M	A	M	J	J	A	S	O	N	D
5 33 20	4 34 20	4.5 39 26	4 48 34	4 57 42	3.7 64 49	3.5 70 55	3.3 70 55	3.7 65 50	4.4 56 42	5.5 48 35	5.2 39 26
- █ Average max. and min. temperatures in °F
- █ Precipitation totals in inches

Halifax (Citadel)

Climate chart (precipitation, max. and min. temperature)
J	F	M	A	M	J	J	A	S	O	N	D
140 0 −8	110 0 −8	133 4 −4	118 9 1	119 14 6	112 20 11	110 23 14	96 23 15	109 19 12	124 13 6	151 8 2	145 3 −4
- █ Average max. and min. temperatures in °C
- █ Precipitation totals in mm
- Source: Environment Canada
Imperial conversion
J	F	M	A	M	J	J	A	S	O	N	D
5.5 32 17	4.3 33 19	5.2 38 25	4.7 48 34	4.7 58 42	4.4 67 51	4.3 74 58	3.8 74 59	4.3 67 53	4.9 56 44	6 47 35	5.7 37 24
- █ Average max. and min. temperatures in °F
- █ Precipitation totals in inches

Sydney

Climate chart (precipitation, max. and min. temperature)
J	F	M	A	M	J	J	A	S	O	N	D
153 −1 −10	128 −2 −10	130 2 −7	133 7 −2	103 13 3	97 19 8	89 23 13	100 23 13	119 19 9	143 13 4	156 7 0	167 2 −5
- █ Average max. and min. temperatures in °C
- █ Precipitation totals in mm
- Source: Environment Canada
Imperial conversion
J	F	M	A	M	J	J	A	S	O	N	D
6 30 15	5 29 13	5.1 35 20	5.2 44 29	4.1 56 37	3.8 65 46	3.5 74 55	3.9 73 56	4.7 66 48	5.6 55 40	6.1 45 32	6.6 36 23
- █ Average max. and min. temperatures in °F
- █ Precipitation totals in inches

Kentville

Climate chart (precipitation, max. and min. temperature)
J	F	M	A	M	J	J	A	S	O	N	D
116 −1 −10	101 −1 −9	110 3 −5	93 10 1	102 16 6	82 22 10	84 25 14	77 24 15	84 20 10	89 14 5	122 8 0	122 2 −6
- █ Average max. and min. temperatures in °C
- █ Precipitation totals in mm
- Source: Environment Canada
Imperial conversion
J	F	M	A	M	J	J	A	S	O	N	D
4.6 30 14	4 31 15	4.3 38 22	3.7 50 33	4 62 42	3.2 71 51	3.3 77 57	3 76 58	3.3 67 49	3.5 57 41	4.8 46 33	4.8 35 21
- █ Average max. and min. temperatures in °F
- █ Precipitation totals in inches

=== Temperature ===
While the constant temperature of the Atlantic Ocean moderates the climate of the south and east coasts of Nova Scotia, heavy build-up of ice in the Gulf of Saint Lawrence makes winters colder in northern Nova Scotia. The shallowness of the Gulf's waters mean that they warm up more than the Atlantic Ocean in the summer, warming the summers in northern Nova Scotia. Summer unofficially lasts from the first Sunday in April to the Saturday before the last Sunday in October. Although Nova Scotia has a somewhat moderated climate, there have been some very intense heatwaves and cold snaps recorded over the past 160 years.

The highest temperature ever recorded in the Mainland of the province was 38.3 °C (101 °F) on August 19, 1935, at Collegeville, which is located about 15 km southwest of Antigonish, at the old Ashdale Schoolhouse now owned by William Wallace.. The highest temperature ever recorded on Cape Breton Island was 37.7°C on August 10, 2001 at Ingonish. The coldest temperature ever recorded was −41.1 °C (−42 °F) on January 31, 1920, at Upper Stewiacke. The highest temperature ever recorded in Halifax was 37.2 °C (99 °F) on July 10, 1912, and the lowest was −29.4 °C (−21 °F) on Feb 18, 1922. For Sydney, the highest temperature ever recorded was 36.7 °C (98 °F) on August 18, 1935, and the lowest was −31.7 °C (−25 °F) on January 31, 1873, and January 29, 1877. Lastly, for Kentville, the highest temperature recorded was 37.8 °C in August, 1944, and the coldest temperature was -31.1 °C on February 19. Making Kentville one of the hottest towns in the summer.

The annual temperatures are:

- Spring from 1 °C (34 °F) to 17 °C (63 °F)
- Summer from 14 °C (57 °F) to 25 °C (77 °F)
- Autumn about 5 °C (41 °F) to 20 °C (68 °F)
- Winter about −9 °C (16 °F) to 0 °C (32 °F)

Due to the ocean's moderating effect, Nova Scotia, on average, is the warmest of the provinces in Canada, owing primarily to the milder winter temperatures experienced in Nova Scotia compared to the rest of Canada.

=== Rainfall ===
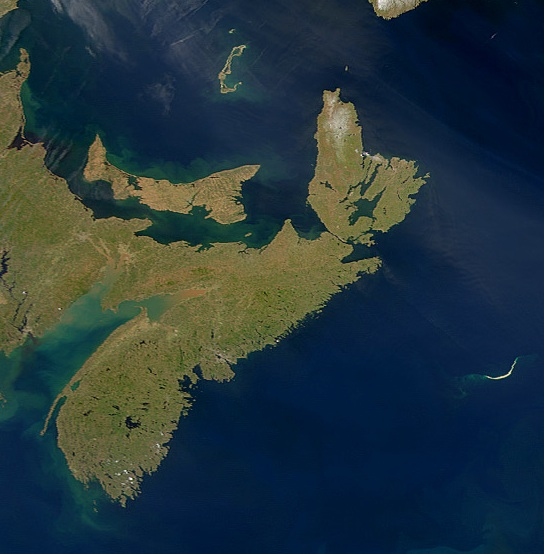
Satellite photo of Nova Scotia

All of Nova Scotia has precipitation well distributed around the year, with a slight summer maximum in some northern/interior areas, but a slight autumn to early winter (October to January) maximum in southern and coastal areas, where July or August is the driest month on average. Autumn and winter storms, arriving in or near Nova Scotia from the U.S. Northeast (often referred to as "nor'easters" because of the intense north east winds they carry), can attain tremendous intensity across coastal areas, resulting in high winds, heavy rain, ice or snow and sometimes all of the above in a single storm. Average annual precipitation changes from 140 centimetres (55 in) in the south with its intense cold-season storm activity, to 100 centimetres (40 in) elsewhere. In the northeast, Sydney is an especially wet area, with an average annual precipitation of nearly 60 inches, with a noticeable autumn to early winter (October to January) concentration, and December the wettest month on average. Nova Scotia is also very foggy in places, with Halifax averaging 121 foggy days per year and Yarmouth 191.

== Storms ==
Because Nova Scotia juts out into the Atlantic, it is prone to intense cold-season storms ("nor'easters" - primarily November to March) arriving from the Northeastern United States, and occasional tropical storms and hurricanes in late summer and autumn. However, due to the relatively cooler waters off the coast of Nova Scotia, tropical storms are usually weak by the time they reach Nova Scotia. Even where a storm retains much of its strength, as with Hurricane Arthur, it is most often extratropical by the time it makes landfall on Nova Scotia.

Altogether there have been 34 such storms, including 13 hurricanes, since records were kept in 1871 – about once every four years. In addition, at least one of these hurricanes (Juan in 2003) made landfall at Category 2 intensity. The most destructive hurricanes were Hurricane Ginny in 1963, Hurricane Juan in 2003 and Hurricane Dorian in 2019, which caused damage in the Halifax area. Hurricane Fiona became the most intense hurricane to landfall in Canada and Nova Scotia in 2022.

Very high winds are frequently experienced in Grand Étang in northern Nova Scotia, which result from the effect of low mountains on southeasterly winds. They are known as Suetes.

Thunderstorms occur usually quite a few a times a year, sometimes being severe. In 2023, severe thunderstorms occurred in July and October, the latter causing relatively large hail in the Halifax area.

Tornadoes are considered relatively rare in Nova Scotia, but there are several on record. The more notable tornadoes happened in White Point in 1954, Pugwash in 1999, and Stewiacke in 2021. The tornado in Pugwash was an F0, and ripped the dining room from a restaurant, the one in White Point was an F1, damaging cabins, snapping trees, and destroying a barn. The tornado in Stewiacke was the strongest tornado since an F1 in Tidnish in 1955, and it destroyed a barn at EF1 intensity. A few weeks after the Stewiacke tornado, another tornado touched down, this time EF0 in Antrim. Waterspouts have occurred too, with one spotted in 2015, and two in 2023.
