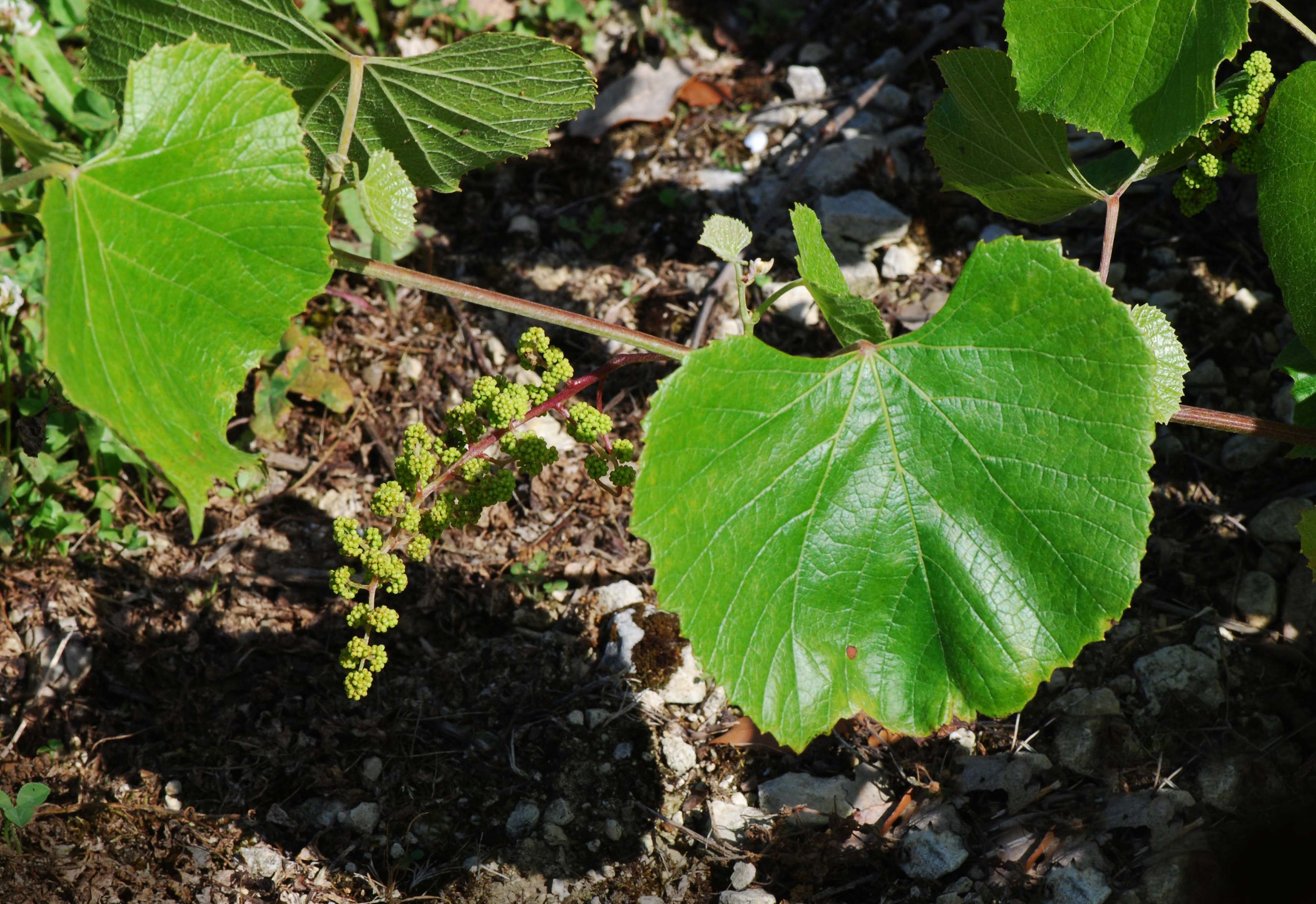

Scientific classification
- Kingdom: Plantae
- Clade: Tracheophytes
- Clade: Angiosperms
- Clade: Eudicots
- Clade: Rosids
- Order: Vitales
- Family: Vitaceae
- Genus: Vitis
- Species: V. berlandieri

Binomial name
- Vitis berlandieri Planch.

= Vitis berlandieri =

Species of grapevine

Vitis berlandieri is a species of grape native to the southern North America, primarily Texas, New Mexico and Arkansas.

It is primarily known for good tolerance against soils with a high content of lime, which can cause chlorosis in many vines of American origin. Lime is a characteristic of the soils of many classical French wine regions and highly regarded vineyard sites, and many Vitis vinifera cultivars were well suited to these growing conditions. When American vines were imported to Europe as rootstocks for grafting V. vinifera on, in the wake of the Great French wine blight, it initially proved difficult to find vine species that would grow well in lime-rich soil. V. berlandieri, which had adapted to limestone hills in central Texas, provided the lime tolerance needed to solve this problem. However, V. berlandieri itself is poorly adapted to grafting. Therefore, various rootstocks resistant against both phylloxera and lime, and suitable for viticulture, were produced by crossing V. berlandieri and Vitis riparia, Vitis rupestris or V. vinifera.

Vitis berlandieri is also known as Fall Grape.

In some classifications it is considered to be a subspecies of Vitis cinerea.
