= Severny (grape) =

Variety of grape

- Grape (Vitis)
- Species: Vitis vinifera
- VIVC number: 11545

Severny is the name of a Russian red-grape variety. Severny results from the interspecific crossing between Seianetze Malengra and Vitis amurensis. The hybrid has been obtained in the Institute for wineyard researches in Rostov-on-Don in Russia. The hybrid was crossed in 1936 by the breeder Ya. I. Potapenko and E. Zakharova in Rostov. The variety has been imported to Finger Lakes AVA, just south of Lake Ontario, in the United States.

Because of the genes present in Vitis amurensis, the grape is very resistant to frost. Further hybridizations have involved the Severny variety, as with the Saperavi Severnyi (with Georgian variety Saperavi) or Cabernet Severny obtentions. It is an important component for the discovery of new grape varieties that can be grown under cold climates.

== Synonyms ==
Synonyms: Severnii, Severnyi
