= Seyval blanc =

Variety of grape

- Grape (Vitis)
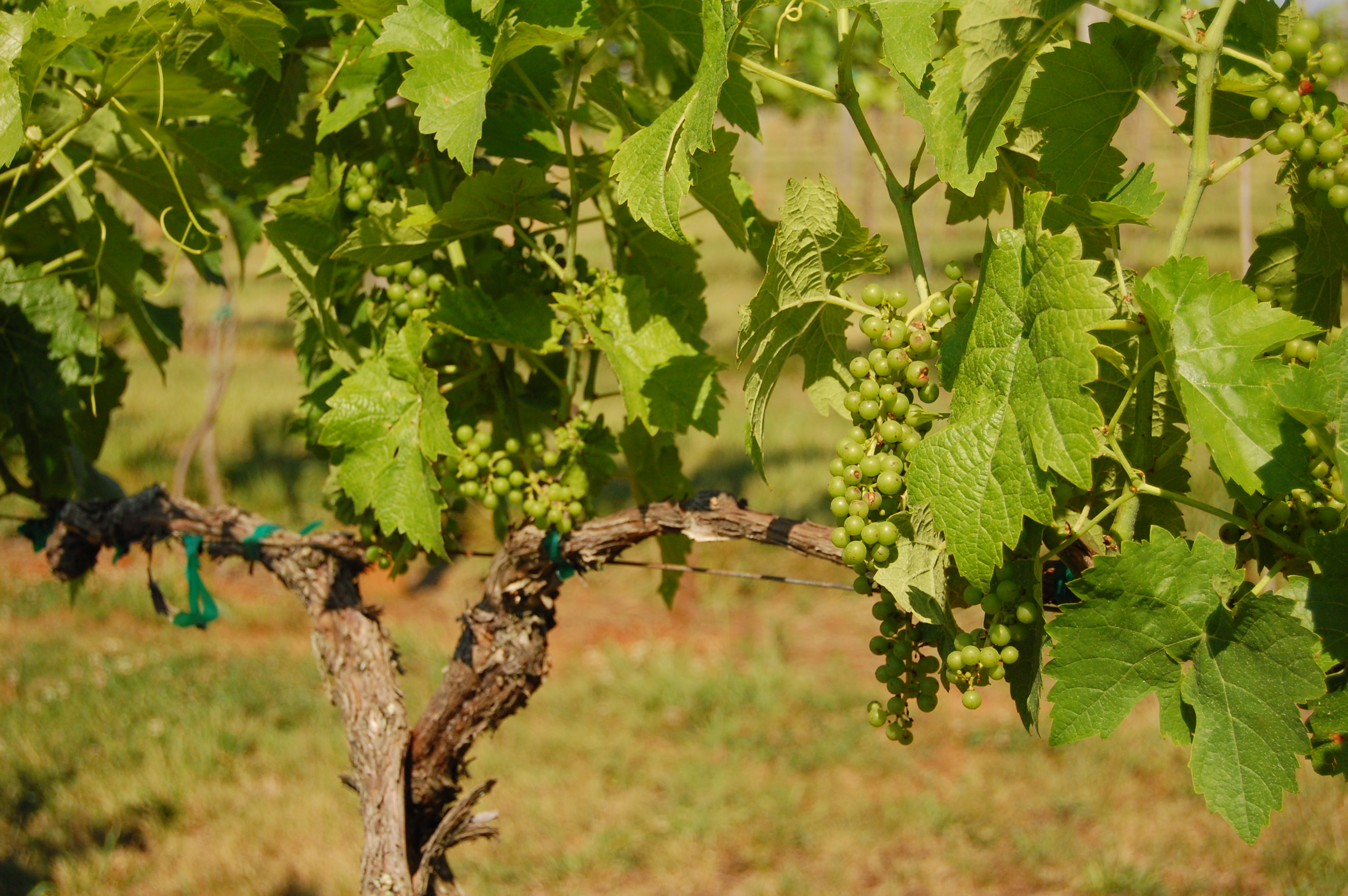
- Seyval blanc grapes prior to veraison.
- Color of berry skin: Blanc
- Species: French hybrid (50% Vitis vinifera; 37% Vitis rupestris; 13% Vitis licencumii )
- Also called: SV 5276, Seyval
- Origin: France
- Notable regions: England, Wales, Canada, USA.
- Hazards: Botrytis in wet years when very ripe
- VIVC number: 11558

Seyval blanc (French pronunciation: [sɛval blɑ̃]; or Seyve-Villard hybrid number 5276) is a hybrid wine grape variety used to make white wines. Its vines ripen early, are productive and are suited to fairly cool climates. Seyval blanc is grown mainly in England, the United States East Coast (specifically the Finger Lakes region of upstate New York, Lake Erie AVA in Pennsylvania, regions in Ohio and Virginia), in the Pacific Northwest (Oregon), as well as to a lesser extent in Canada. Seyval blanc was created either by Bertille Seyve, or his son-in-law Villard, as a cross of Seibel 5656 and Rayon d'Or (Seibel 4986), and was used to create the hybrid grape St. Pepin. Seyve and Villard used the same Rayon d'Or x Seibel 5656 crossing to produce the red wine grape Seyval noir.

Since it contains some non-vinifera genes, Seyval blanc is outlawed by the EU authorities for quality wine production, which was an issue of conflict with the English wine industry.

== Wine styles ==
Seyval blanc has a characteristic citrus element in the aroma and taste, as well as a minerality that may be compared to white Burgundy. It is often oaked and subjected to a stage of malolactic fermentation.

== Synonyms ==
Seyval blanc is known under the synonyms Seival, Seyval, Seyve Villard 5-276, Seyve Villard 5276, and SV 5276.
