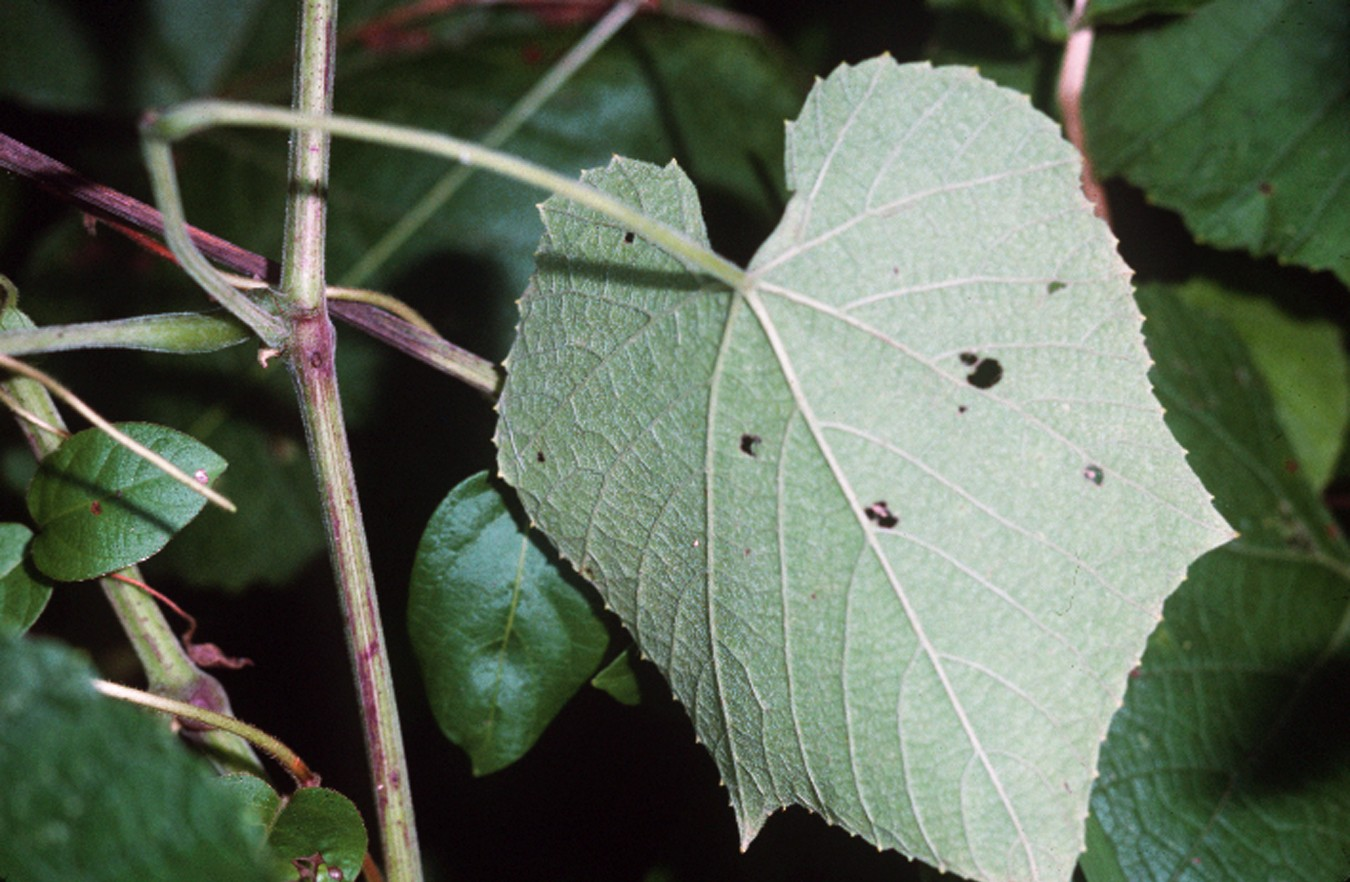

Conservation status
- Apparently Secure (NatureServe)

Scientific classification
- Kingdom: Plantae
- Clade: Tracheophytes
- Clade: Angiosperms
- Clade: Eudicots
- Clade: Rosids
- Order: Vitales
- Family: Vitaceae
- Genus: Vitis
- Species: V. cinerea

Binomial name
- Vitis cinerea (Engelm. ex A.Gray) Engelm. ex Millard
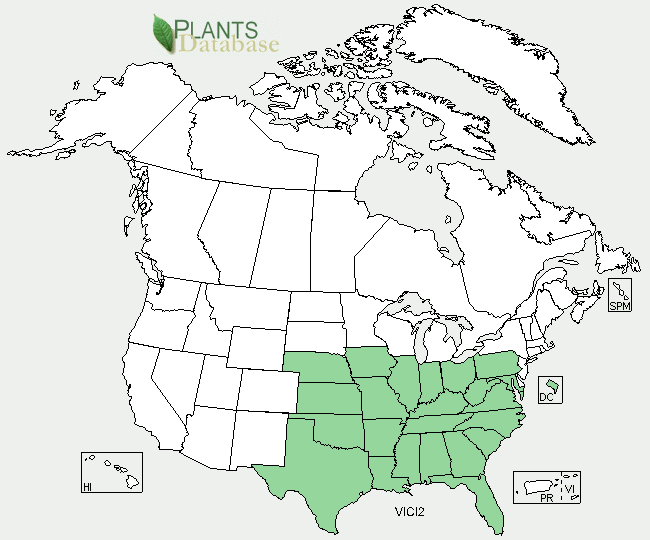

= Vitis cinerea =

Species of grapevine

Vitis cinerea, the graybark grape, is a variety of grape. It has small black berries that are mildly unpleasant to eat. Plentiful in Missouri and Louisiana, it is also found throughout the eastern half of the US as far west as Texas, north to Illinois, and south to Florida. It is also known by the name winter grape or possum grape.

Vitis cinerea is an American native grape. The leaves are cordiform-emarinate, flabby, dull, limb finely wrinkled (like crepe) between the sub-veins. The teeth of the leaf are very blunt. The buds are grey-ashy-violet.

This species occurs in habitat types such as floodplain woodlands, wet thickets, and swampy forests.
