= Japanese wine =

Wine making in Japan

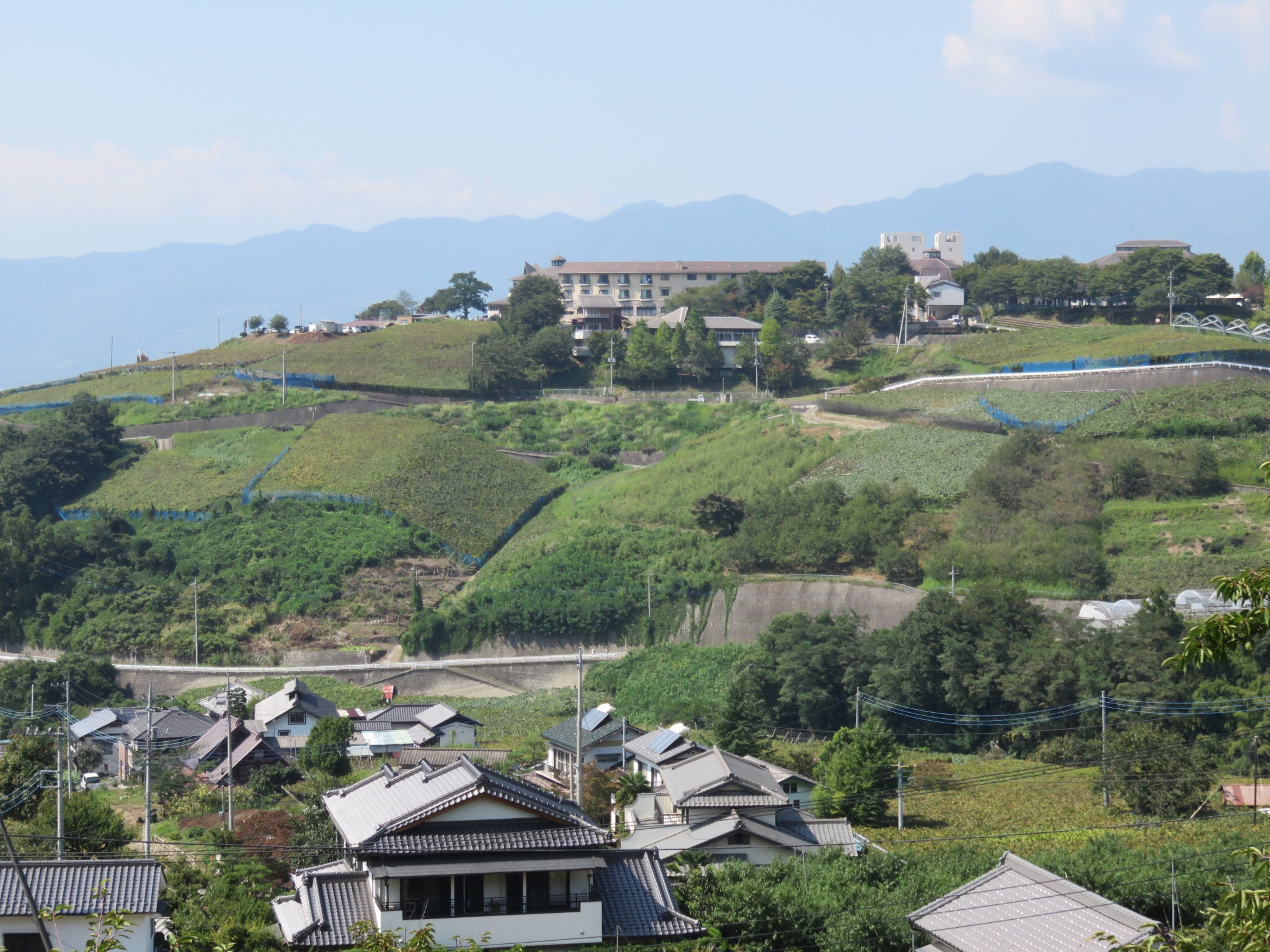
Vineyards in Kōshū, Yamanashi, Japan

Although viticulture and the cultivation of grapes for table consumption has a long history in Japan, domestic wine production using locally produced grapes only really began with the adoption of Western culture during the Meiji restoration in the second half of the 19th century.

According to data from Japan's National Tax Agency for 2017, approximately 382,000 kiloliters of wine was purchased in Japan, of which two-thirds was imported wine. Of the 102,000 kiloliters of wine domestically produced that year, only a fifth came from domestically grown and harvested grapes. The Agency states the share of Japanese wine, as defined as domestically produced wine from domestically grown grapes, as only 4% of total domestic consumption, or 14,988 kiloliters. Only 58 kiloliters of Japanese wine was exported overseas.

The main region for winemaking in Japan is in Yamanashi Prefecture which accounts for approximately a third of domestic production, although grapes are cultivated and wine is also produced in more limited quantities by vintners throughout the country, from Hokkaido in the North to Miyazaki Prefecture on the Southern island of Kyushu.

== History ==
=== Early history ===
Grape-growing in Japan began in 718 AD, in Katsunuma, Yamanashi Prefecture. Japan's early viticulture was based on the Koshu grape, thought to be originally from the Georgia caucasus region.

The first regularly documented wine consumption in Japan was however in the 16th century, with the arrival of Jesuit missionaries from Portugal. Saint Francis Xavier brought wines as gifts for the feudal lords of Kyūshū, and other missionaries continued the practice, resulting in locals acquiring taste for wine and importing it regularly. They called the Portuguese wine chintashu (珍陀酒), combining the Portuguese word tinto (chinta in Japanese) meaning red and shu (酒) meaning liquor.

=== Meiji Era ===
There was a prejudice that Japanese looked at red wine and mistook it for "blood," while Westerners drank "living blood."

A report written in 1869 by Adams, Secretary to the British Legation in Yedo, describes "a quantity of vines, trained on horizontal trellis frames, which rested on poles at a height of 7 or 8 feet from the ground" in the region of Koshu, Yamanashi. It was not until 1873 however, after detailed reports on European wine culture were made available by returning members of the Iwakura Mission, that more focused attempts were made to promote domestic wine production. The first attempt to produce wine locally, using mainly sake brewing equipment, was undertaken by Hironori Yamada and Norihisa Takuma in Kofu, Yamanashi, in 1875. In 1877, the newly formed winery Dai-Nihon Yamanashi Budoshu in Katsunuma, Yamanashi dispatched Masanari Takano and Ryuken Tsuchiya to Troyes in the Champagne region of France to learn viticulture and wine production techniques. The cultivation of European grape varieties formed the core of early Japanese attempts, however the project was all but destroyed in 1884 by an outbreak of Phylloxera that arrived via imported root stock.

=== 20th century ===
In many prefectures a few small scale viniculturists remained, but it was not until after World War II that the scale of winemaking began to grow. However, in comparison to the growth of imported wines and the production of low cost retail wines from imported grape juices, domestically grown and harvested wine still remained at an early stage of development.

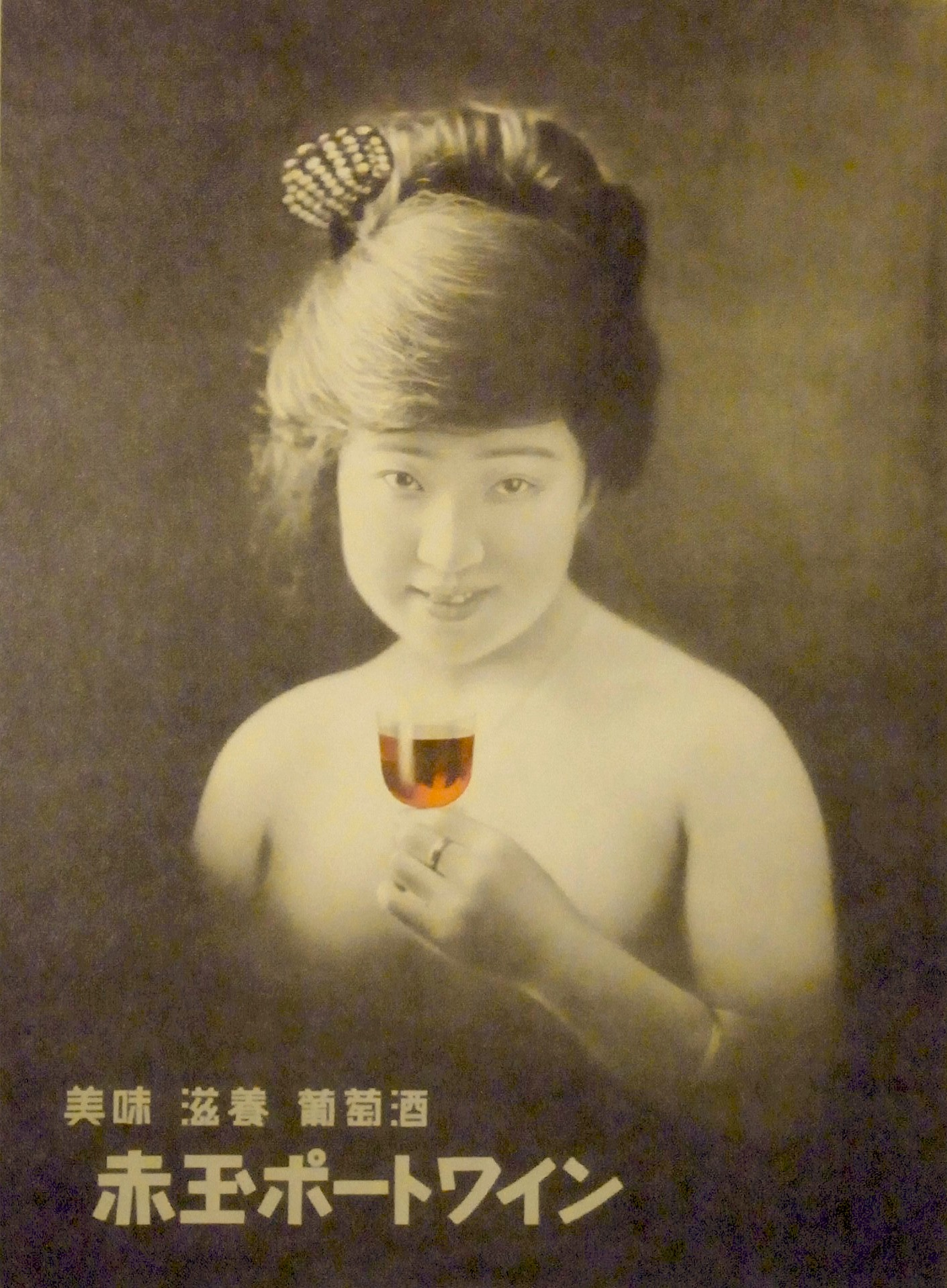
Advertising poster of "AKADAMA Port Wine”, the first published in 1922

In terms of Japanese taste for domestically produced wine, astringency and acidity were not readily accepted at the beginning.^{2} For a long time sugars such as honey were added to moderate the flavor and "sweet" (甘口, amakuchi) wine was the mainstay. In 1907, Shinjiro Torii, founder of the Suntory beverages empire launched Red Sun Port Wine (赤玉ポートワイン, Akadama Pōto Wain) with an advertising campaign in 1922 that both scandalized with its suggestion of nudity, and prompted a huge boost to sales. The trend for sweetened, fortified and medicinal tonic wines continued until the 1970s when wine was still fundamentally known as grape liquor (葡萄酒, budōshu), and only a small minority imported and drank European wine.^{3}

During the 1970s and 80s the skill level of wine making increased and the purchases of both imported and domestic wine grew with the rapidly expanding economy. Specialists began to call their holdings "wineries", and the emulation of Western style hedging and cultivation of insect resistant grape varieties spread. For the first time domestic wineries began to focus on producing superior wines using only domestically cultivated grapes. Also, in response to demand from Japanese consumers, the production of organic wines also became popular.

In the 1990s and 2000s due to a reduction in taxes on imported wine and a diversification of Japanese food culture, wine consumption continued to grow. In 1995, Shinya Tasaki became the first Japanese to be awarded the title of Meillieur Sommelier du Monde, and helped to significantly raise public awareness of wine appreciation. Media attention given to the beneficial effects of polyphenol (tannins) and local government led efforts to promote high quality domestically produced wine also contributed to industry expansion. From 2002 onward, leading with Yamanashi Prefecture, competitions focused on "Japanese wine using only 100% Japanese grapes" began.

By the end of the 20th century, the growing popularity of wine within Japan translated into an estimated 15 million people now drinking wine on a regular basis.

== Vine cultivation ==
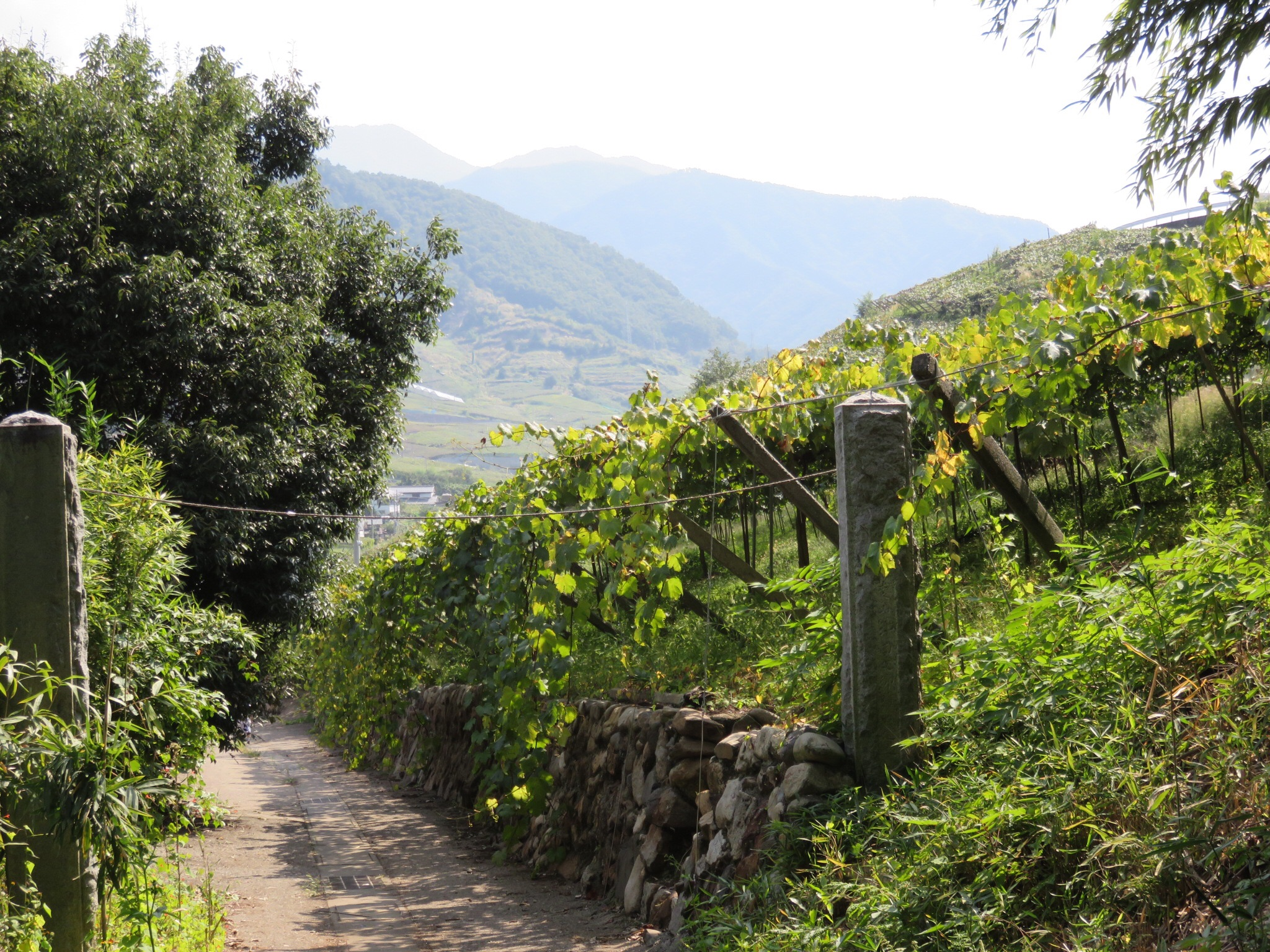
Elevated vine trellises, Kōshū, Yamanashi

To accommodate the challenges of climate and terrain in Japan vine cultivation techniques have been extensively adapted. In areas of high humidity during the summer, an elevated horizontal hedging technique known as "Tanajitate" (棚仕立) is used to keep the fruit about 1.5–2 meters above the ground to allow ventilation. Horizontal trellises have also proven effective in reducing wind damage from typhoons. On sloping land, Italian ryegrass is often planted under the vines to help prevent soil erosion.

In areas higher in the mountains, such as Tochigi, where good sunlight is at odds with the jagged terrain, winemakers have planted their hedges on steep hillsides both to receive a maximum of sunlight, as well as protect the vines against damage from heavy snowfall.

== Industry structure ==
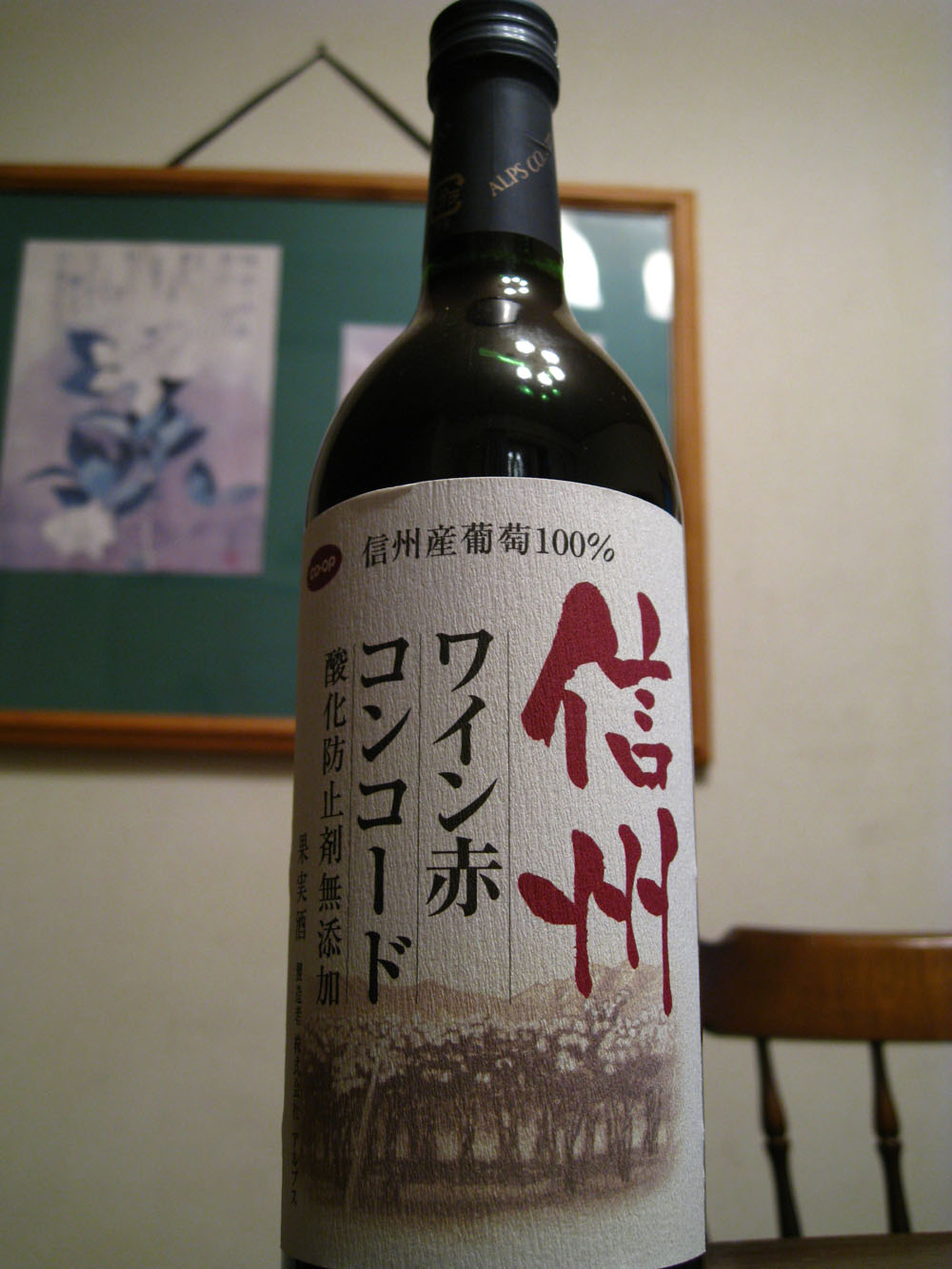
Japanese Shinshū Wine (信州ワイン) from Nagano Prefecture

There are relatively few independent wine producers in Japan, the industry being dominated by large beverage conglomerates such as Suntory, owner of the Snaraku, and Manns Wine brands, Sapporo trading with brands such as Chateau Lion, Delica, and Kirin through its Mercian Corporation operating subsidiary, owner of the Chateau Mercian label. All the major beverage conglomerates have access to domestically grown grapes, but given the challenge of climate on domestic grape production, three quarters of the wine bottled by Japanese producers relies to some extent on imported bulk wine or grape concentrate. Domestically produced mass market wines using imported wine or grape concentrate are required by law to note this on the label.

Japanese wines produced using only 100% domestic grape content command a price premium and are only occasionally exported. Smaller, family or city owned wineries of note gaining a reputation for producing domestically grown wines of consistently better quality include Marufuji, Kizan, Katsunuma Jozo, Grace (all in Yamanashi Prefecture) Takeda (Yamagata Prefecture) and Tsuno (Miyazaki Prefecture).

== Major wine producing regions of Japan ==
In Japan the main regions for wine production, listed in order of production volume of wine made from domestically grown grapes, are Yamanashi (31%), Nagano (23%) and Hokkaidō (17%). In Yamanashi, the main wine region is the Koshu Valley, an area that centers around the town of Koshu and is home to 70 of the approximately 80 wineries in the prefecture. In Hokkaidō, the town of Ikeda recovered economically from a state of bankruptcy with regional planning toward grape growing and wine production and within 20 years following 1960 was able to make it successful. Thereafter, every region began to foster production, the main cause of which was the influence of the nationwide "One Village, One Speciality Movement" (一村一品運動, Isson Ippin Undō). In Yamagata during World War II wine was produced in large amounts for the military to provide the dietary supplement cream of tartar, and because the soil in Yamagata is suitable for fruit cultivation, today it is one region that is home to numerous well known producers. In the recent past Aichi Prefecture was also a large producer of wine.

- Hokkaidō: Tokachi Wine (十勝ワイン), Ikeda. Furano Wine (ふらのワイン), Furano.
- Yamagata Prefecture: Tendō Wine (天童ワイン), Tendō.
- Niigata Prefecture: Iwanohara Wine (岩の原ワイン), Jōetsu.
- Yamanashi Prefecture: Katsunuma Wine (勝沼ワイン), Kōshū. "Rubaiyat", Kōshū. 100% Domestically grown grapes.
- Nagano Prefecture: Shinshū Wine (信州ワイン), Shiojiri.
- Shiga Prefecture: Hitomi Wine (ヒトミワイン), Higashiōmi.
- Tochigi Prefecture：Nasu Wine (那須ワイン), Nasushiobara.
- Kyoto Prefecture: Tanba Wine (丹波ワイン), Kyōtanba.
- Osaka Prefecture: Kawachi Wine (河内ワイン), Kashiwara and Habikino.
- Hyōgo Prefecture: Kobe Wine (神戸ワイン), Kobe
  - In Hyogo Prefecture, Kobe City took the initiative to by developing regional agriculture and tourism with independent wineries as well has launching city-brand products.
- Miyazaki Prefecture: Aya Wine (綾ワイン), Aya. Tsuno Wine (都農ワイン), Tsuno.

== Japanese grape varieties ==
Japan supports a wide range of grape varieties although the vast majority of this production is for table consumption and only a small percentage is used in domestic wine making. Strictly speaking there are no vines native to Japan, although the Koshu white wine grape has evolved locally over many centuries and is therefore considered an indigenous variety. Hardy varietals imported from North America such as the Delaware and Niagara grape were widely planted in the post war period, but since 1985 have significantly declined in popularity. Premium table consumption grapes such as Kyoho and more recently Pione, a hybrid cultivar of Kyoho and Cannon Hall Muscat, command significant price premiums for producers.

Grapes used solely for winemaking are produced in limited quantities as price margins for table grapes are often significantly higher. Imported wine grape cultivars include Müller-Thurgau, Chardonnay, Merlot and Cabernet Sauvignon.

=== Koshu ===
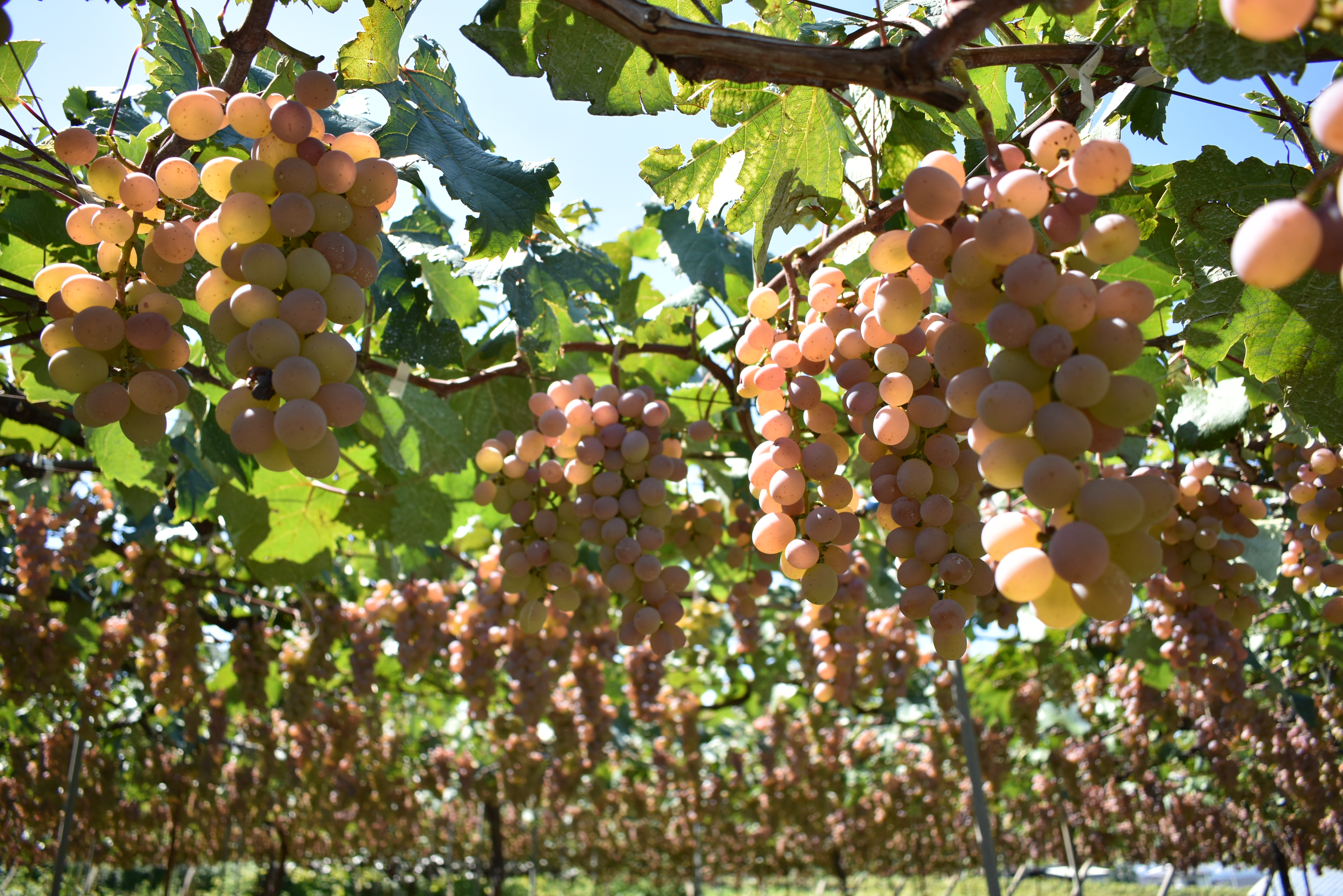
Koshu grape

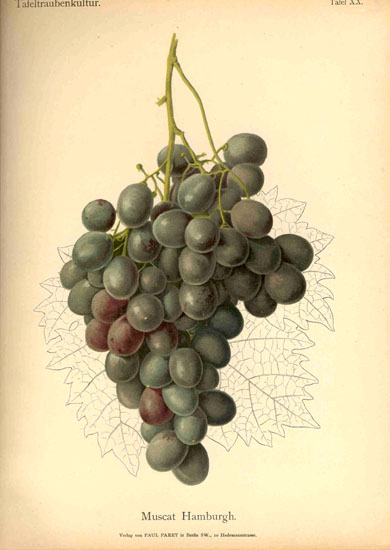
Muscat Hamburg grape

Koshu is a white wine grape variety grown primarily in Yamanashi Prefecture. The grape varietal developed from vines likely imported from the Caucasus through the Silk Road, at a period estimated to be around a thousand years ago. The grape is a hybrid variety indigenous to Japan, and benefits from a relatively thick skin able to withstand the damp of the Japanese Summer. The name “Koshu” is a former name for Yamanashi.

Characteristics of wines made from the Koshu grape are typically a pale, straw colour and a soft, fruity bouquet with overtones of citrus and peach. The taste is often described as clean, delicate and fresh, considered a good match for Japanese cuisine.

=== Muscat Bailey A ===
"Muscat Bailey-A" (マスカットべリーA) is a red wine grape hybrid developed by Zenbei Kawakami (川上善兵衛, Kawakami Zenbei) (1868–1944) at the Iwanohara Winery (岩の原わいん) in Niigata Prefecture. Kawakami's goal was to develop a grape for wine adapted to Japan's climate. He did this by mixing the "Bailey" (ベーリー) type grape with a Black Muscat type grape to give birth to a red wine grape that is widely used in Japan. Also developed by Kawakami was the variety known as "Black Queen" (ブラッククイーン). The characteristics of Muscat Bailey-A are a very grape juice-like flavor and it is most widely used in sweet amakuchi wines. However, in recent years, drier varieties and barrel aged varieties have also been developed. Muscat Bailey-A has been blended with western grapes creating a very full bodied, Bordeaux style flavour. In addition, different blending has led to smoother Bourgogne/Burgundy varieties.

== Designation of Origin ==
"Mark of Origin" (原産地表示, Gensanchi Hyōji) is a system of legal designation for wine produced in Japan, much like France's Appellation d'Origine Contrôlée (AOC) laws and the United States' American Viticultural Area (AVA) designations.

In Japan there is no nationwide organization of legal designation, regardless of domain of origin or types of grape, anything that is fermented domestically can be labeled as "Japanese wine". Because of this, there are some products labeled as Japanese that are produced using imported grape juice.^{4}

However, independent self-governing municipal bodies have begun systems of regional appellation. For example, Nagano Prefecture's "Appellation Control System" (長野県原産地呼称管理制度, Nagano-ken Gensan-chi Koshō Kanri Seido), and Kōshū's "Wine Domain of Origin Certification Regulation" (ワイン原産地認証条例, Wain Gensan-chi Ninshō Jōrei).

== See also ==
- Agriculture in Japan
- Japanese cuisine
