= Autumn Royal =

Variety of grape

- Grape (Vitis)
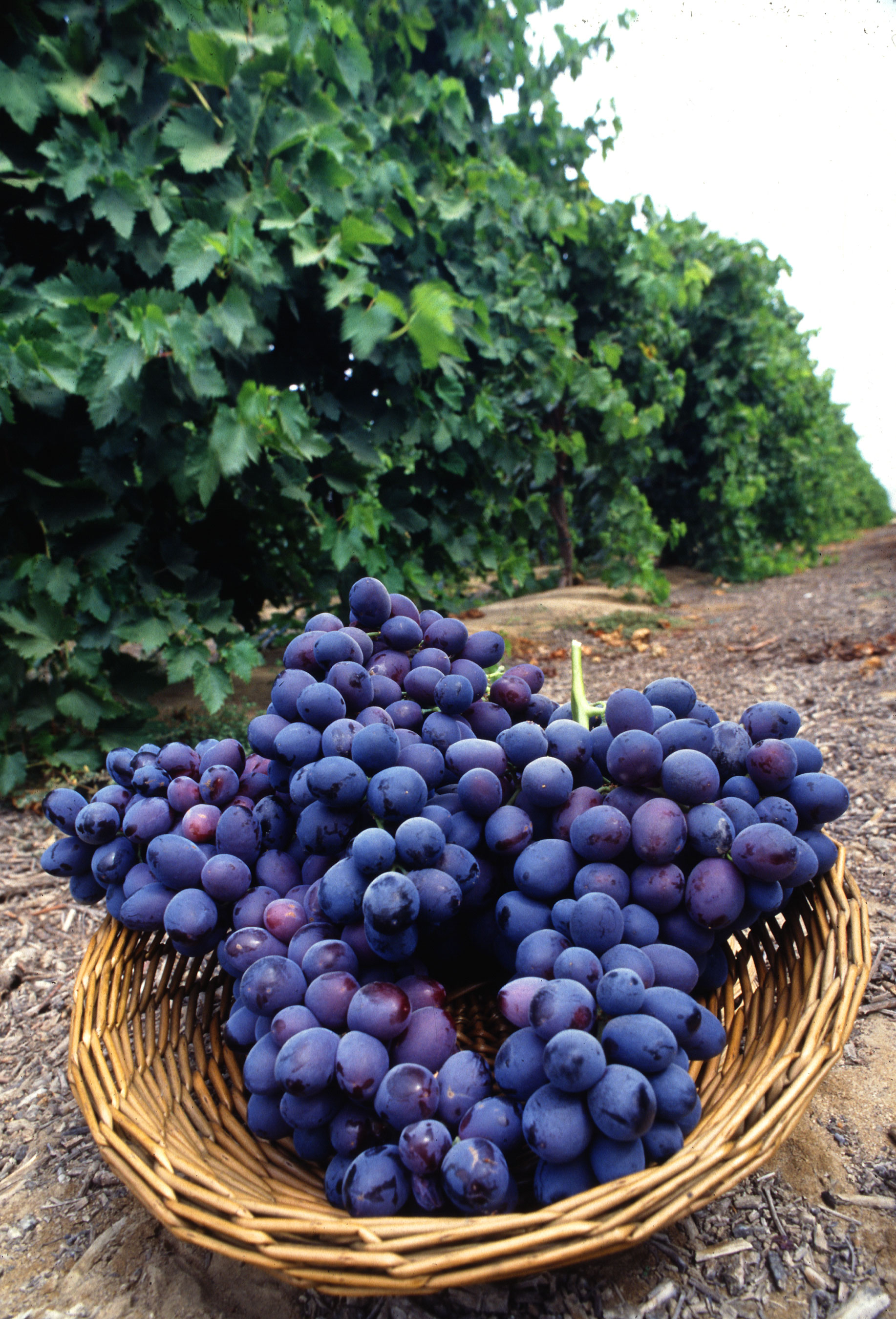
- Autumn royal table grapes
- Color of berry skin: Black
- Species: Vitis vinifera
- Also called: A 97-68
- Origin: California
- Original pedigree: Autumn Black × C74-1
- Breeder: David Ramming and Ron Tarailo
- Breeding institute: USDA ARS Hort. Crops Research Lab (Parlier, CA)
- VIVC number: 17651

Autumn Royal is a seedless table grape variety first produced in California, and released in 1996. Its parentage includes many types of grapes, including Black rose, Calmeria, Flame Seedless and Ribier.

== Description ==
The berries of the Autumn Royal are larger than most other grape varieties produce. The berries naturally weigh at least 8 grams, compared with the berries of the Thompson seedless, which weigh 6-7 grams even when girdled and treated with gibberellin. It is currently the largest natural berry size among seedless cultivars. The berries are in an ovaloid shape and purple to black in color.

== Commercial appeal ==
The main commercial appeal to Autumn Royal grapes is their large natural size and late maturity. Because of their large natural size, it is not necessary for growth treatments to be used. Relatively few inputs are required to produce high-quality fruit. According to a 2010-11 report to the California Table Grape Commission, Autumn Royal is among the fourteen top-selling California-grown grapes in the state.
