= Almeria (disambiguation) =

Almería is a city in Spain.

Almeria may also refer to:

== Places ==
- Port of Almeria, the commercial port of Almería
- Almería, Colima, a municipio in Mexico
- Province of Almería, in southern Spain
- Almeria, Biliran, a municipality in the Philippines
- Almeria, Nebraska

== Other uses ==
- Almeria (moth), a moth genus
- Almeria grape, a type of white grape
- UD Almería, a football (soccer) club in the city of Almería
- 5879 Almeria, an asteroid
- Almería (album), a 2012 album by American alternative rock band Lifehouse
- River Almería, a stretch of the Andarax
- Almeria, a character in the 1697 play The Mourning Bride

== See also ==
- Almaria
