= IFG =

IFG may refer to:

- IFG Group, Irish financial parent company of James Hay Partnership
- Impaired fasting glycaemia, or impaired fasting glucose - a pre-diabetic condition
- Inferior frontal gyrus, part of the brain's prefrontal cortex
- Institute for Government, a United Kingdom-based think tank
- Interframe gap, a transmission pause in computer networking
- International Fruit Genetics, a California-based fruit breeding company
- Indian Field Gun, Indian gun
