= Niabell =

Grape varietal

- Grape (Vitis)
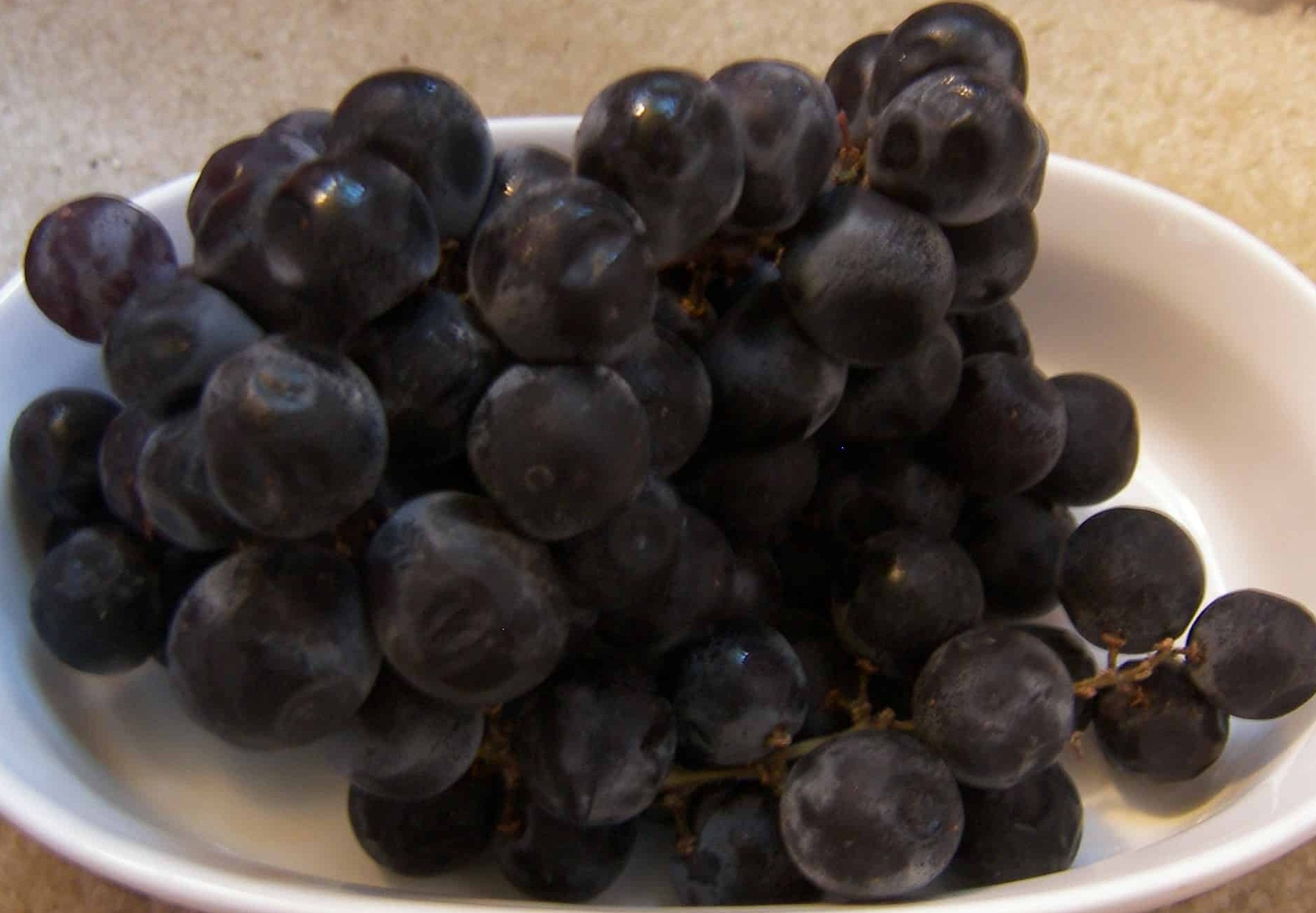
- Niabell
- Color of berry skin: Blue-black
- Species: Vitis labrusca
- Also called: California's Concord
- Origin: California
- Notable regions: San Joaquin Valley, California
- Hazards: fungus and black rot
- Breeder: Harold Olmo
- Year of crossing: 1942

Niabell grape or California's Concord is a type of table grape that is used to make grape juice because of its sweet taste. This type of grape, which has a similar taste to Concord grape, is grown in temperate climates. In the United States, the San Joaquin Valley has many vineyards for growing this type of grape due to the favorable climatic conditions. Harold Olmo was developed in 1942. This grape, like Concorde, has large grains and is widely used to produce jelly. Its wine can also be prepared as a sweet.

Niabell is ready for harvest in July and August in California. This grape is not resistant to cold, so it can not be stored in the refrigerator and is consumed fresh. Its skin is thick and blue (blackish). Niabell, like other descendants of fox grapes, Venus and Mars, is highly resistant to pests such as fungus and black rot.

== See also ==
- Thomcord
- Arctostaphylos uva-ursi
- Sultana
