= Pione =

Pione may refer to:

- Pione (grape), grape variety
- Pione (Demosponge), genera of the family Clionaidae
- Pione Sisto (born 1995), Danish footballer
