= Wistow, North Yorkshire =

Village and civil parish in North Yorkshire, England

Coordinates: 53.81386°N 1.1012°W

Wistow
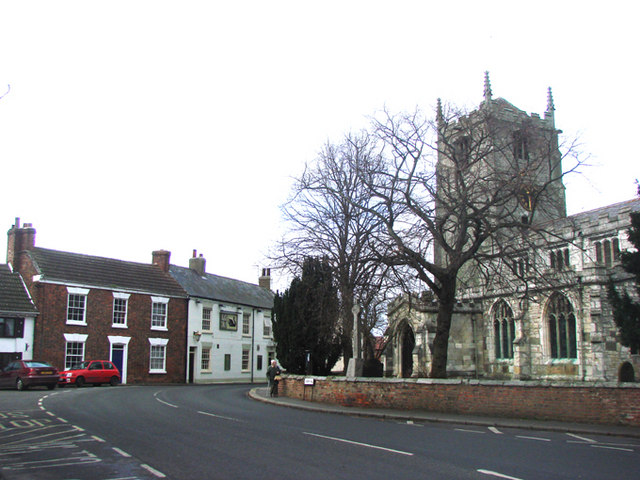
- Wistow Centre

- Location within North Yorkshire
- Population: 1,333 (2011 census)
- OS grid reference: SE592356
- Unitary authority: North Yorkshire
- Ceremonial county: North Yorkshire
- Region: Yorkshire and the Humber
- Country: England
- Sovereign state: United Kingdom
- Post town: SELBY
- Postcode district: YO8
- Dialling code: 01757
- Police: North Yorkshire
- Fire: North Yorkshire
- Ambulance: Yorkshire

Wistow is a small village and civil parish just north of Selby, North Yorkshire, England. In the 2011 Census it had 1,333 residents; an increase from 2001 when there was 1,135.

It was historically part of the West Riding of Yorkshire until 1974. From 1974 to 2023 it was part of the Selby District. It is now administered by the unitary North Yorkshire Council.

== History and overview ==
The name Wistow derives from the Old English wīcstōw meaning 'dwelling place'.

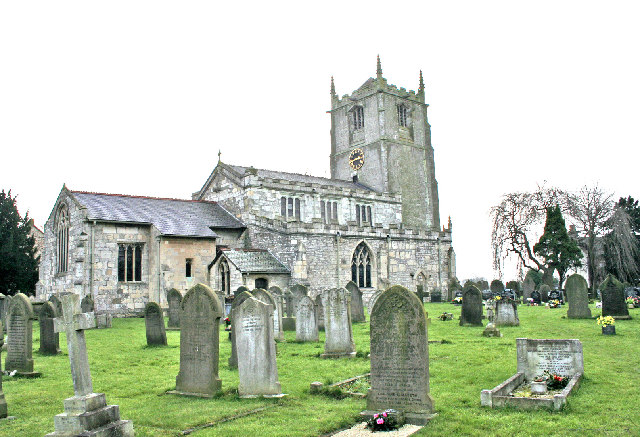
All Saints' Church

All Saints' Church in Wistow is a Grade I listed building erected in the 15th century and expanded in 1901. It continues to hold community services, and has three functioning bells.

From 1983 until 2004 Wistow had a colliery, part of the Selby Coalfield. Wistow railway station provided a passenger service from 1898 to 1929 and continued to provide goods services until total closure in 1960.

Wistow Parochial serves as the village primary school and Selby High School is the nearest provider for secondary education. The Black Swan is the public house in the settlement. There is also a Methodist Chapel, fish & chips vendor, guest house, boarding kennels, a cattery and a nursery.

A notable building to the north-east of Wistow called Jubilee Hall, is used as a place for hosting village events.

William Thompson, a viticulturist credited in California with the development of the Thompson Seedless grape variety, was born and raised in Wistow.

== See also ==
- Listed buildings in Wistow, North Yorkshire
