= Mars grape =

Grape cultivar

Mars
- Grape (Vitis)
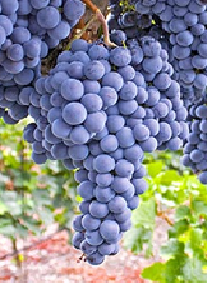
- Thomcord grapes
- Color of berry skin: Blue
- Species: Vitis labrusca
- Origin: Arkansas
- Notable regions: Canada, United States
- Hazards: fungus and black rot
- VIVC number: 7432

The Mars seedless grape is a cultivar of grape that has medium clusters and thick skin. The color of this grape is blue and it grows in hot and dry areas in hot summers. This grape variety is a pest-resistant and has a taste similar to Concord grape. It is cultivated for purposes such as preparing grape juice, producing jelly and consuming it as a table grape. This type of grape is also popular in cultivation for its varieties, Venus and Niabel, due to its resistance to climate change, as well as common pests among grapes, such as superficial white fungus and black rot.

== See also ==
- Thomcord
- Arctostaphylos uva-ursi
- Sultana
