= Campbell Early =

Variety of grape

- Grape (Vitis)
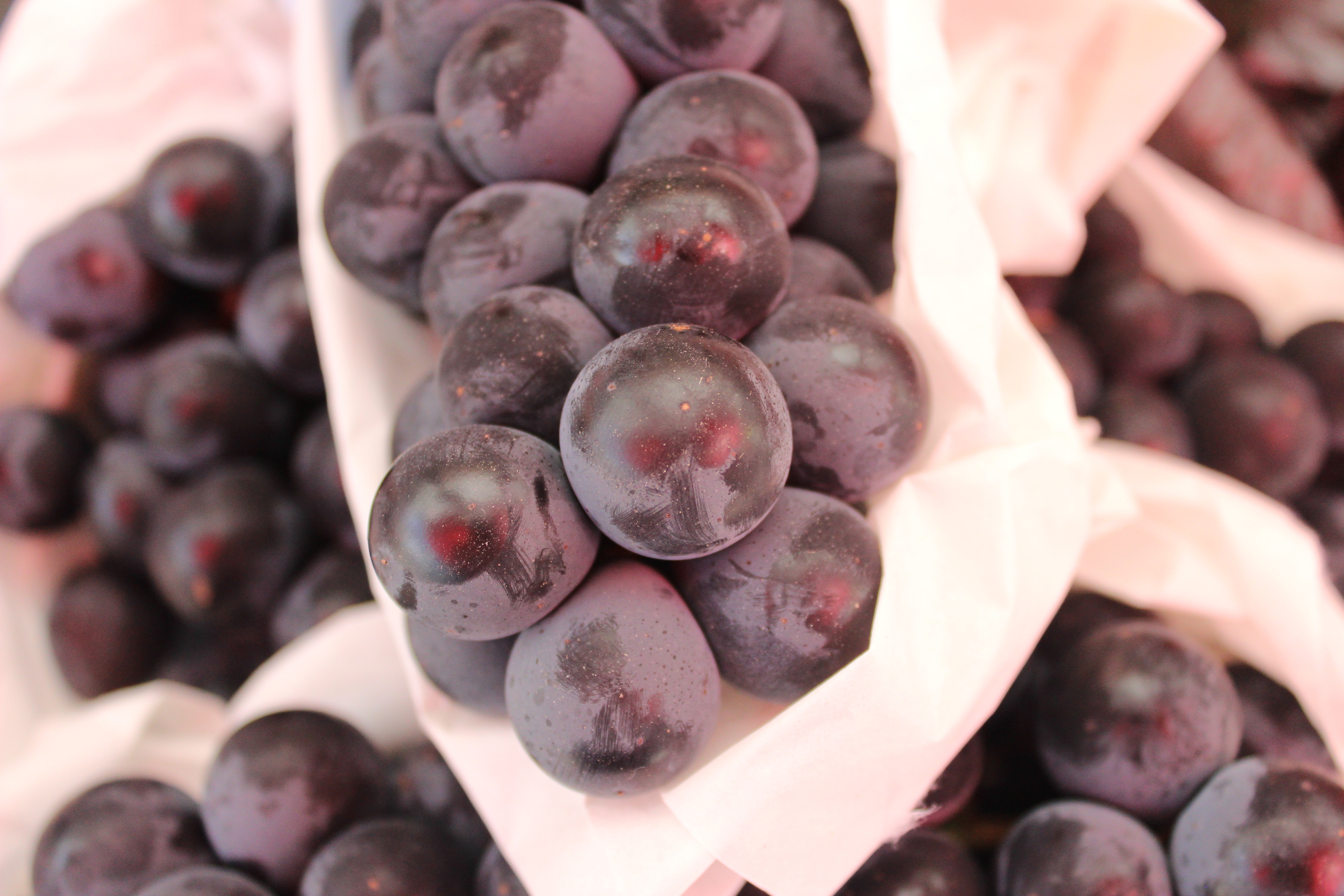
- packaged berry clusters
- Color of berry skin: Noir
- Species: Vitis × labruscana
- Also called: Early Campbell, Campbell's Early, Island Belle, Boscoso
- Origin: Delaware, Ohio
- Pedigree parent 1: Moore Early
- Pedigree parent 2: Black Muscat × Belvidere
- Notable regions: Eastern U. S., South Korea, Japan
- Hazards: fruit blight (Phomopsis), Pseudocercospora leaf spot
- Breeder: George W. Campbell
- Year of crossing: 1890
- Year of selection: 1892
- Formation of seeds: Complete
- VIVC number: 2029

Campbell Early is a hybrid table grape cultivar (Vitis × labruscana). It is also known by several other names, including Boscoso, Island Belle, Campbell's Early, and Early Campbell. Its fruits are prized for their attractive appearance and sweetness. It is the main variety for the production of table grapes in South Korea, accounting for over 70 % in 2009. In Japan, the berries are mainly used for juicing and wine. It used to be a highly recommended standard variety for the New York market.

== History ==
The variety is a cross between Moore Early and a cross of Black Muscat and Belvidere. It was raised from seed by horticulturalist George W. Campbell (1817–1898) in Delaware, Ohio, in 1890. It was selected in 1892 and commercialized in 1894. It was enthusiastically received and spread rapidly. There exists a bud sport named Ishihara-wase, also known as "Large berry Campbell", whose tetraploidy results in larger berries. Niabell and Early Niabell were bred from a cross with the Niagara variety. Other descendants include Jinok, Kyoho, and Hongisul.

== Description ==
The plant is considered relatively resistant to pathogens, although berry blight/fruit blight (Phomopsis) and Pseudocercospora/Isariopsis leaf spot may be an issue. It is adapted to both hot and humid climates as well as being very cold hardy. It suffers if certain soil conditions are not met. The flowers are self fertile. The berries ripen early in rather compact, rather big bunches. The berries are of good quality and medium to large in size. Under unfavorable moisture conditions, they can be prone to cracking. The relatively (for a labruscana) thin fruit skin is purplish-black in color with plenty of wax bloom on top. Some foxiness (the typical aroma of its V. labrusca parentage, the eponymous "fox grape") in the taste of the greenish, translucent, and juicy pulp vanishes once the berries are fully ripe.
