= Koshu Valley =

Wine-producing area in Japan

Koshu Valley refers to the main wine-producing area of Japan, a valley extending around the town of Koshu in the eastern part of Yamanashi Prefecture. The area comprises the towns of Koshu, Yamanashi and Fuefuki, collectively known as the "Kyōtō Region" (峡東地域). An alternative name for the area is the "Kyōtō Wine Resort" (峡東ワインリゾート), translated into English as the "Yamanashi Wine Resort" to avoid confusion with the city of "Kyoto" which has a similar pronunciation.

The valley, including some of the surrounding mountains, covers 756 square kilometers. It constitutes the largest grape producing area in Japan and has the highest concentration of wineries in the country, making it the leading producer of Japanese wine, especially from the Koshu grape.
