= Ruby Roman =

Variety of grape

- Grape (Vitis)
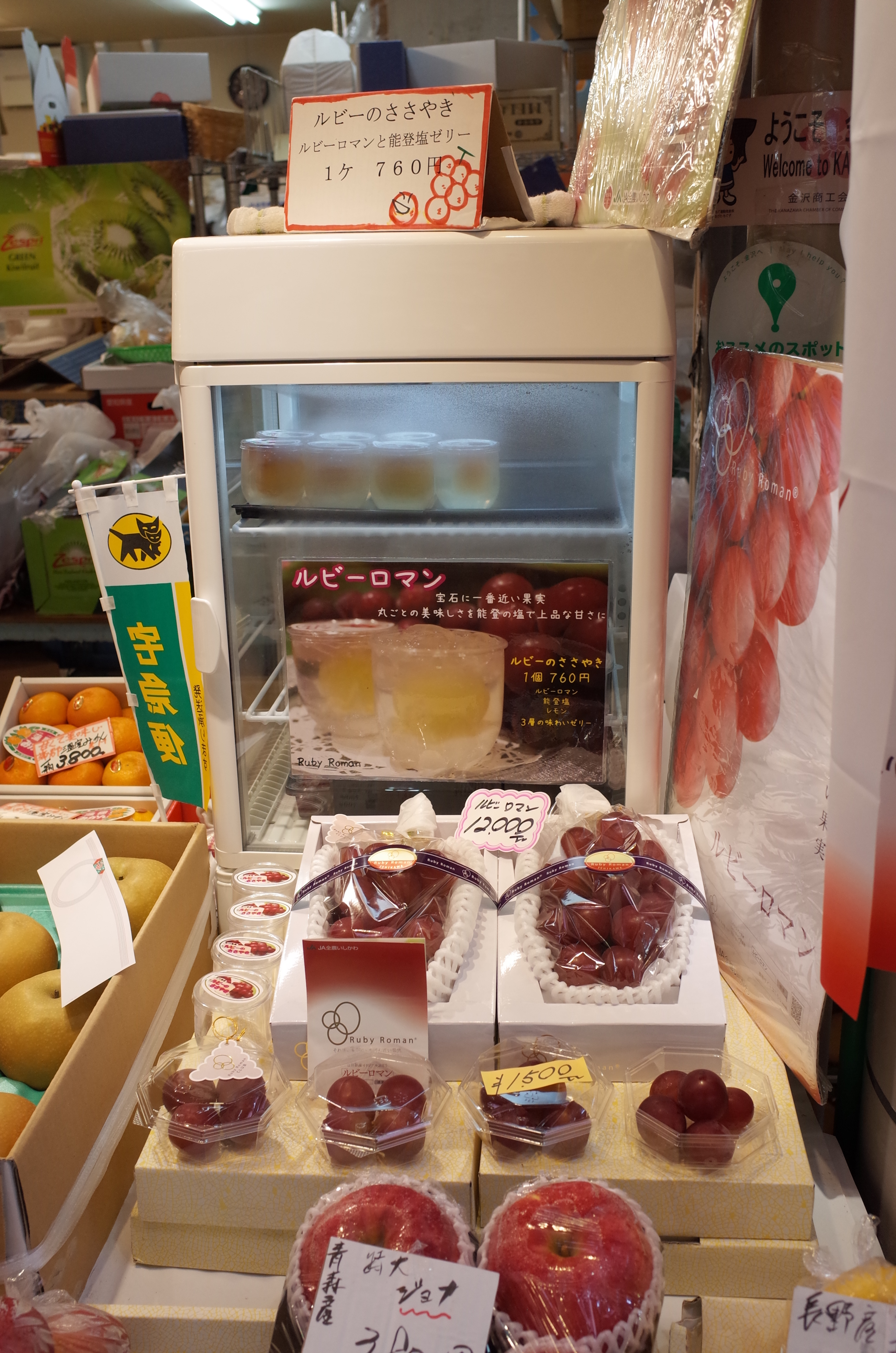
- Ruby Roman grapes for sale in Kanazawa, Ishikawa Prefecture
- Color of berry skin: Red
- Species: Vitis vinifera
- Origin: Ishikawa Prefecture, Japan
- VIVC number: 25760

Ruby Roman is a variety of table grape grown and marketed entirely in Ishikawa Prefecture, Japan. It is red in color and about the size of a ping-pong ball. The first Ruby Roman grapes went on sale in August 2008 for 100,000 Japanese yen (US$910) per 700-gram bunch, or $26 per grape. They are said to be the most expensive variety of grapes. In July 2016, a single bunch of Ruby Roman grapes, containing 26 grapes at a weight of about 700 grams (25 oz), sold for 1.1 million yen (around $8400) in the year's first auction at a wholesale market in Kanazawa.

== Origins ==
In 2008, the Ruby Roman grape debuted as a new variety of premium grapes in Japan. The new grape was named Ruby Roman via public referendum. Every grape is checked strictly to guarantee its quality, with certification seals placed on those thus selected. The Ruby Roman has strict rules for selling; each grape must be over 20g and over 18% sugar. In addition, a special "premium class" exists which requires the grape to be over 30g and where the entire fruit bunch must weigh at least 700g. In 2010, only six grapes qualified for premium status while in 2011, no grapes made the cut.
