= Flame Seedless =

Variety of grape

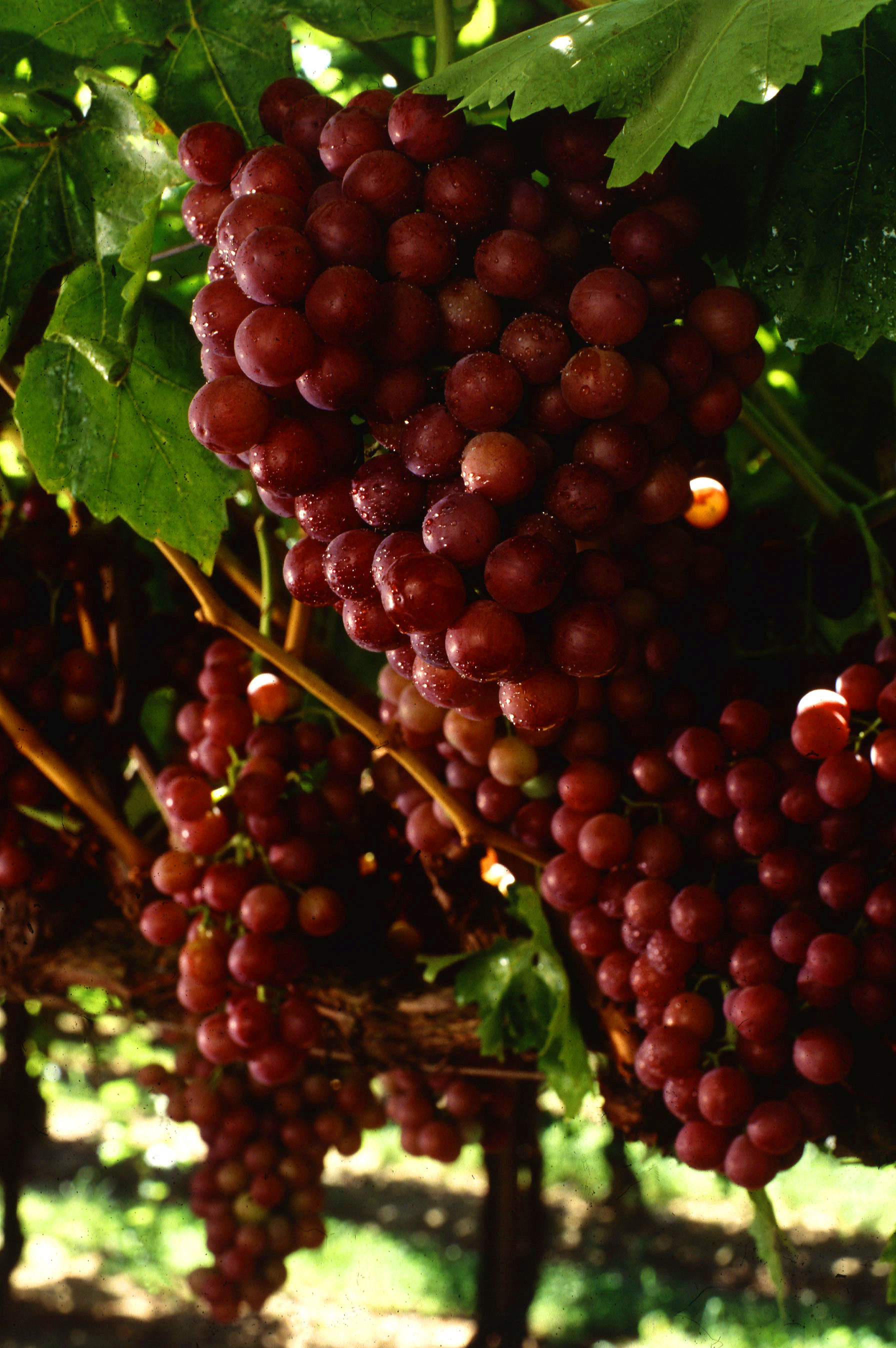
Flame Seedless grapes

The Flame Seedless (Vitis vinifera) is a vigorous, heavy-bearing table grape cultivar that keeps well in storage. It is a hybrid of Thompson Seedless, Cardinal, and several other Vitis vinifera cultivars. It produces large clusters of medium-large red grapes with a sweet flavor.

Flame Seedless requires a long growing season. Thus, the plants fare poorly in cool, damp zones. However, its good qualities, especially seedlessness, sweetness, and long shelf life, make it one of the most heavily farmed table grapes.

The Flame Seedless was brought to the United States by John J. Kovacevich of Arvin, California, in 1973. For a Flame Seedless to be called good-quality, it must be plump, well-colored, and firmly attached to the stem. The grapes are usually picked ripe, as they do not ripen after harvest.

== See also ==
- List of grape varieties
