= International Fruit Genetics =

Fruit-breeding company in California

- Company type: Private
- Industry: Fruit breeding
- Founded: 2001; 25 years ago
- Founders: David Cain; Jack Pandol; Glen Stoller; Terrie Stoller; Craig Stoller
- Headquarters: Bakersfield, California, United States
- Key people: Andy Higgins (CEO); Chris Owens (Head of research)
- Products: Grape and cherry licensing, including Cotton Candy grapes
- Owner: Bloom Fresh International (2023–present)
- Parent: AMFresh, EQT Future &; Paine Schwartz Partners (2023–present)
- Website: ifg.world

International Fruit Genetics (IFG) is a private Bakersfield, California-based fruit breeding company that licenses patented breeds of fruit to growers worldwide. The largest breeder of table grapes has licensed one type of this fruit to Bakersfield-based grower Grapery, Cotton Candy.

In August 2023, it was announced that a consortium led by AMFresh had completed the purchase of the company. Subsequently, EQT Future and Paine Schwartz Partners became minority partners in Bloom Fresh International, a new entity created when SNFL Group and IFG merged.

== History ==
Based in Bakersfield, IFG was founded in 2001 by David Cain, Jack Pandol, Glen Stoller, his wife Terrie Stoller, and their son Craig Stoller.

Cain was a fruit breeder who in the 1970s worked in Fresno, California as a researcher with the USDA, developing new varieties of table grapes and seedless raisins. Meanwhile, Pandol was a UC Davis plant scientist graduate and third generation grape grower who had founded grape growing company Grapery in 1996.

Glen and Terrie Stoller were the founders of Bakersfield-based grapevine nursery Sunridge Nurseries, a supplier of plant material to the wine and table grape industry, and their son Craig was the company's president. IFG formed a partnership with Grapery and Sunridge Nursery.

A few months after forming IFG, Cain attended a trade show where researchers from the University of Arkansas were showing grapes. One was a purple Concord grape that tasted sweet like cotton candy, but was fragile with tiny seeds. He licensed that grape along with others from the university for IFG, and improved the size and texture by crossbreeding the grapes with sturdier California grapes.

In 2010, after years of cross-pollinating and testing numerous grapes, IFG patented the Cotton Candy grape, and began licensing it to growers. In the following year, its partner The Grapery was doing trial development of IFG's Sweet Sunshine, Sweet Surrender and Sweet Celebration.

Other IFG created grape varieties include the Moon Drop grape. First created in 2004, patented in 2011 and trademarked in 2014, these grapes have a recognizable elongated, almost cylindrical shape.

In 2018, a year after the first Candy Hearts grapes went on sale in California, the company's Cheery Grand cherry, seen as a possible replacement for the Chelan cherry, began getting harvested in Chile and Australia.

In July 2020, the company announced six new named varieties of table grapes, bringing their total to 40. Also in 2020, long time lead grower and co-founder David Cain retired, and was replaced by new lead plant breeder Chris Owens.

In April 2021, the company broke ground on development of a $12 million breeding research and campus in McFarland, California, as part of its twenty-year anniversary celebration.

== Business ==
IFG invents, develops, and licenses proprietary hybrid fruit varieties in the United States and other countries. The varieties are patented, and IFG's income is derived from licensing the intellectual property rights in the plants it develops. When IFG develops a new variety of fruit, it applies for "plant variety rights" in countries where it wants to license the grapes. The license allows growers to grow and sell the fruits.

In order to breed seedless grapes, the breeders have to take out the baby embryos from the plant, then grow them in individual test tubes in the lab before they can be planted. A new variety can take from six to fifteen years to create.

== Products ==
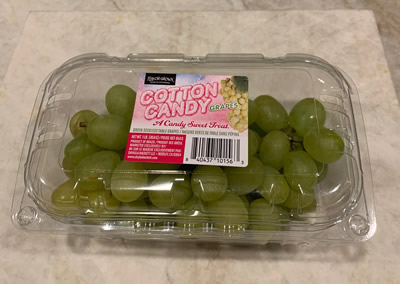
Cotton Candy grapes in their packaging

IFG breeds custom varieties of fruits including grapes and cherries, patents them and licenses them to growers. Their grapes come in red, black or green varieties. The company's licensed products include its signature Cotton Candy grapes, Sweet Celebration, a crunchy, cherry red, mid- to late-season seedless grape with a large berry, and Candy Hearts brand sweet red grapes. Other shapes and flavors have names invoking sweet flavors. As of July 2020, the company had developed 40 different varieties of grapes.

== Operations ==
IFG grapes are grown in the United States, Peru, Chile, Brazil and Mexico. As of August 2018, the company's grapes were being sold in 14 countries.
