= William Thompson (viticulturist) =

English-born viticulturist and wine producer in California (1816–1897)

William Thompson (26 November 1816 - 19 October 1897) was an English-born viticulturist, credited with the introduction and popularization of the Sultana grape in the Central Valley of California. Known widely as the Thompson Seedless variety in the United States, the high yielding pale green grape accounts for approximately 95% of raisins produced in California.

== Early life and career ==
William Thompson was born in Wistow, Yorkshire, England in 1816. On the 1841 UK Census, he is described as 'Agricultural Labourer'. By the 1851 Census, he was 'Gardener of 9 acres (36,000 m^{2}), employing 1 man'.

Thompson emigrated to the United States and after a period living in Illinois settled with his family in Sutter, California in 1863. In 1872 he acquired cuttings of the Lady de Coverly (sultana) grape from the Elwanger & Barry Nursery of Rochester, New York. The original grape rootstock is assumed to have originated from territories than now make up parts of modern Iran or Turkey only acquiring the Lady de Coverly varietal name after having been successfully cultivated in English glasshouses.

After grafting the cuttings onto existing rootstock, Thompson was eventually successful in 1875 of producing a crop of 50 pounds of large sweet, thin skinned seedless grapes. Thompson was generous in sharing his cuttings and the first 200-acre vineyard of Thompson's grapes were planted by his friend J.P. Onstott. From this vineyard cuttings were shared throughout the Central Valley and by 1920 the Thompson Seedless variety had replaced the seeded Muscat of Alexandria grape as the preferred raisin variety.
