= Cotton Candy grapes =

Hybrid variety of grapes with a naturally occurring cotton candy flavor

Cotton Candy
- Grape (Vitis)
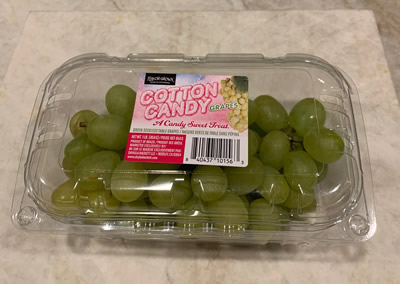
- Cotton Candy grapes
- Color of berry skin: Blanc
- Species: interspecific Vitis hybrid
- Also called: IFG Seven
- Origin: California, United States
- Notable regions: Bakersfield, California
- Breeder: David Wayne Cain
- Year of crossing: 2003
- VIVC number: 24039

Cotton Candy is the trademark for a variety of sweet white table grapes of the cultivar IFG Seven whose flavour has been compared to cotton candy. The grapes were developed by horticulturist David Cain and his team at Bakersfield, California-based fruit breeder International Fruit Genetics (IFG). The grapes were first commercially grown in California by grower Grapery, which began selling them in 2011.

== Development ==
David Cain was a fruit geneticist and former USDA researcher who co-founded IFG in Bakersfield in 2001. A few months after forming the company, he attended a trade show where researchers from the University of Arkansas were showing grapes. One was a purple Concord grape that tasted sweet like cotton candy, but was fragile with tiny seeds. He licensed that grape and began working to improve the size and texture by crossbreeding the grapes with sturdier California grapes. He hand pollinated to cross pollinate millions of grapes to combine the sweet Concord grapes with common grapes in order to make them firmer. Pollen from male grape flowers was extracted and brushed onto the female clusters of the target plant. Over twelve years, a hundred thousand plants were created and grown in test tubes before developing the Cotton Candy variety of grape. In 2010, IFG patented the grape and began licensing it to growers, including California grower Grapery. Grapery was founded in 1996 by Jack Pandol, a UC Davis plant scientist graduate and third generation grape grower, and was co-owned by fellow grower Jim Beagle.

== Description ==
Cotton Candy grapes measure between 19 and 20 degrees Brix, a measurement of a fruit's sweetness; most grapes measure between 17 and 18 Brix. According to Jim Beagle, the CEO of Grapery, this makes them "probably sweeter than the average grape, but within the range of sweetness." Weighing in at about 18 grams (0.63 oz) of sugar per 100 grams (3.5 oz) of grapes, the cotton candy grapes have about 2 g (0.071 oz) more sugar per 100 g (3.5 oz) than regular table grapes. The grapes have a flavor similar to cotton candy, though no artificial flavoring is added.

== Production and distribution ==
In addition to California, growers also grow the grapes in Peru, Spain, Italy, Chile, Brazil, South Africa, Australia, Egypt, and Mexico.

The fruit is available in every state of the US but only on a seasonal basis. Retailers include Trader Joe's, Metro Market, Sam's Club, Aldi, Wegmans, and Whole Foods.

As of September 2017, the company's grapes were being sold in 14 countries.
