= All Saints' Church, Wistow =

Anglican church in North Yorkshire, England

Coordinates: 53°48′50″N 1°06′07″W

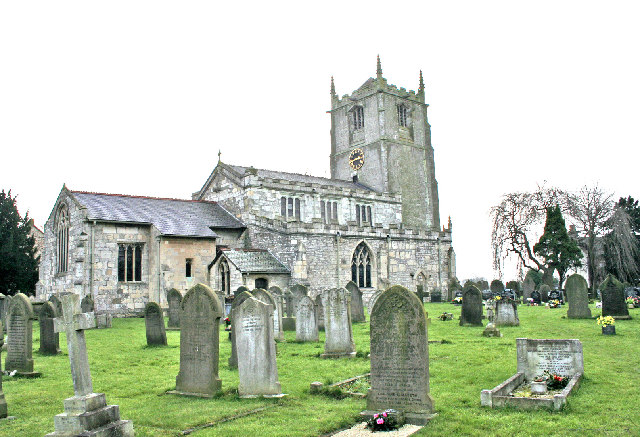
The church, seen from the north-east, in 2006

All Saints' Church is the parish church of Wistow, a village north-west of Selby in North Yorkshire, in England.

There has been a church on the site since at least the 12th century, but the oldest surviving parts of the current church are 13th century. It was altered in the 14th and 15th centuries, and then in the 16th century, the chancel was rebuilt and a tower was added. From 1883 to 1884, it was restored by James Demaine, who added a vestry and organ chamber, while the stained glass windows were restored by J. W. Knowles. In 1900, C. Hodgson Fowler installed a new floor, and in 1911 Walter Brierley repaired the reredos and panelling. The church was Grade I listed in 1966.

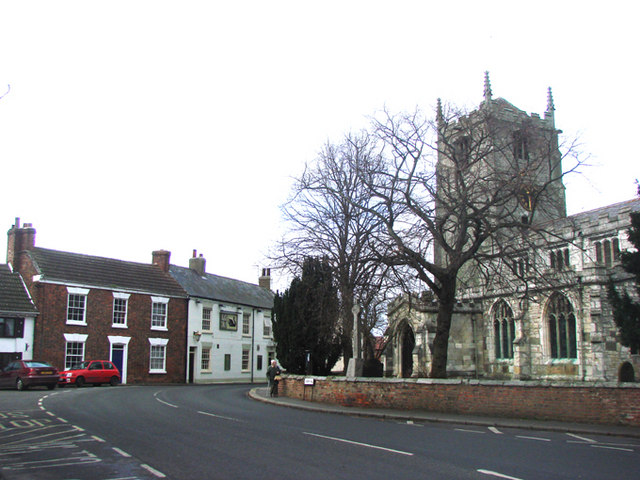
South-east view of the church, in 2006

The church is built of Magnesian Limestone, with a roof of tiles and Welsh slate. 13th century features include the south arcade, west door, and lancet windows to the nave, some of which contain mediaeval glass. The east window is 14th century, with five lights, while the other windows in the chancel are 15th century and flat headed. The tower has three stages, and is in the Perpendicular style. Inside, there is an 18th-century memorial with a carved death's head and painted shield.

== See also ==
- Grade I listed buildings in North Yorkshire (district)
- Listed buildings in Wistow, North Yorkshire
