= Listed buildings in Wistow, North Yorkshire =

Wistow is a civil parish in the county of North Yorkshire, England. It contains eight listed buildings that are recorded in the National Heritage List for England. Of these, one is listed at Grade I, the highest of the three grades, and the others are at Grade II, the lowest grade. The parish contains the village of Wistow and the surrounding area. All the listed buildings are in the village, and consist of houses, a church and a war memorial.

== Key ==
Grade	Criteria
I	Buildings of exceptional interest, sometimes considered to be internationally important
II	Buildings of national importance and special interest

== Buildings ==
Name and location	Photograph	Date	Notes	Grade
All Saints' Church; 53.81383°N 1.10184°W		13th century	The church has been extended and altered through the centuries. It is built in magnesian limestone with roofs of red tile and Welsh slate. The church consists of a nave with a clerestory, north and south aisles, a south porch, a chancel and a west tower. The tower has three stages, stepped diagonal buttresses, a west doorway, window and bell openings all with hood moulds, clock faces, and embattled parapet with crocketed pinnacles. The aisles, clerestory and porch also have embattled pinnacles.	I
Oak Farm; 53.81362°N 1.09871°W	—	c. 1720	A house, divided into two, in orange-red brick, the front rendered and colourwashed, on a plinth, with a moulded modillion cornice, and a hipped and swept pantile roof. There are two storeys and a U-shaped plan, with a central range of four bays, and two rear wings. On the front is a recessed porch with a segmental pediment. The windows are sashes with wedge lintels.	II
Oaklands; 53.81328°N 1.10084°W	—	1735	The house is in orange-brown brick on a plinth, with dressings in magnesian limestone, a floor band, a modillion eaves band, and a swept pantile roof with magnesian limestone kneelers and gable coping. There are two storeys and four bays. On the front are a doorway and sash windows, all under segmental arches of gauged brick.	II
Blacksmith's Shop; 53.81374°N 1.10422°W	—	Early to mid-18th century (probable)	A house, and a stable block later incorporated into the house, in orange-red brick with a capped floor band, a dentilled eaves cornice, and a swept pantile roof. There are two storeys, two bays, and a low two-storey rear outshut. There are two ground floor openings under elliptical arches, and above are casement windows with elliptical heads.	II
1 Church Hill; 53.81358°N 1.10211°W	—	Late 18th century	The house is in pinkish-brown brick, with stone dressings, and a tile roof with stone kneelers and gable coping. There are two storeys and three bays. The central doorway has a rectangular fanlight and a cambered head, and the windows are sashes. All the openings have painted wedge lintels with fluted keystones.	II
West Villa; 53.81292°N 1.10845°W		Late 18th to early 19th century	The house is in pinkish-brown brick on a plinth, with stone dressings, stepped eaves, and a pantile roof with stone kneelers and gable coping. There are two storeys and three bays. The central doorway has pilasters, a rectangular fanlight, a frieze and a cornice. The windows are sashes in architraves with wedge lintels and fluted keystones.	II
Manor Field House; 53.80968°N 1.09909°W	—	Early to mid-19th century (probable)	The house is in pinkish-brown brick on a plinth, with stone dressings, and a Welsh slate roof with stone kneelers and coping. There are two storeys and three bays. On the front is a porch with pilasters, a frieze and a cornice, and a doorway with a rectangular fanlight. The windows are sashes with painted wedge lintels and fluted keystones. At the rear is a stair window with an elliptical head.	II
War memorial 53.81366°N 1.10184°W		1920	The war memorial, in the churchyard of All Saints' Church, is in grey granite and about 3.3 metres (11 ft) in height. It consists of a wheel-head cross on a tapering shaft on a tapering plinth on a two-stepped base. On the front are inscriptions and the names of those lost in the two World Wars.	II
