= Almeria (grape) =

Variety of grape

The Almeria grape is a mild-white grape, grown in both the United States and Spain. It is unusual among cultivated grapevines in that it is pistillate, and requires a second grape cultivar to provide pollen, but has remained in cultivation for centuries despite this due to its quality as a table grape.
