= Pione (grape) =

Variety of grape

- Grape (Vitis)
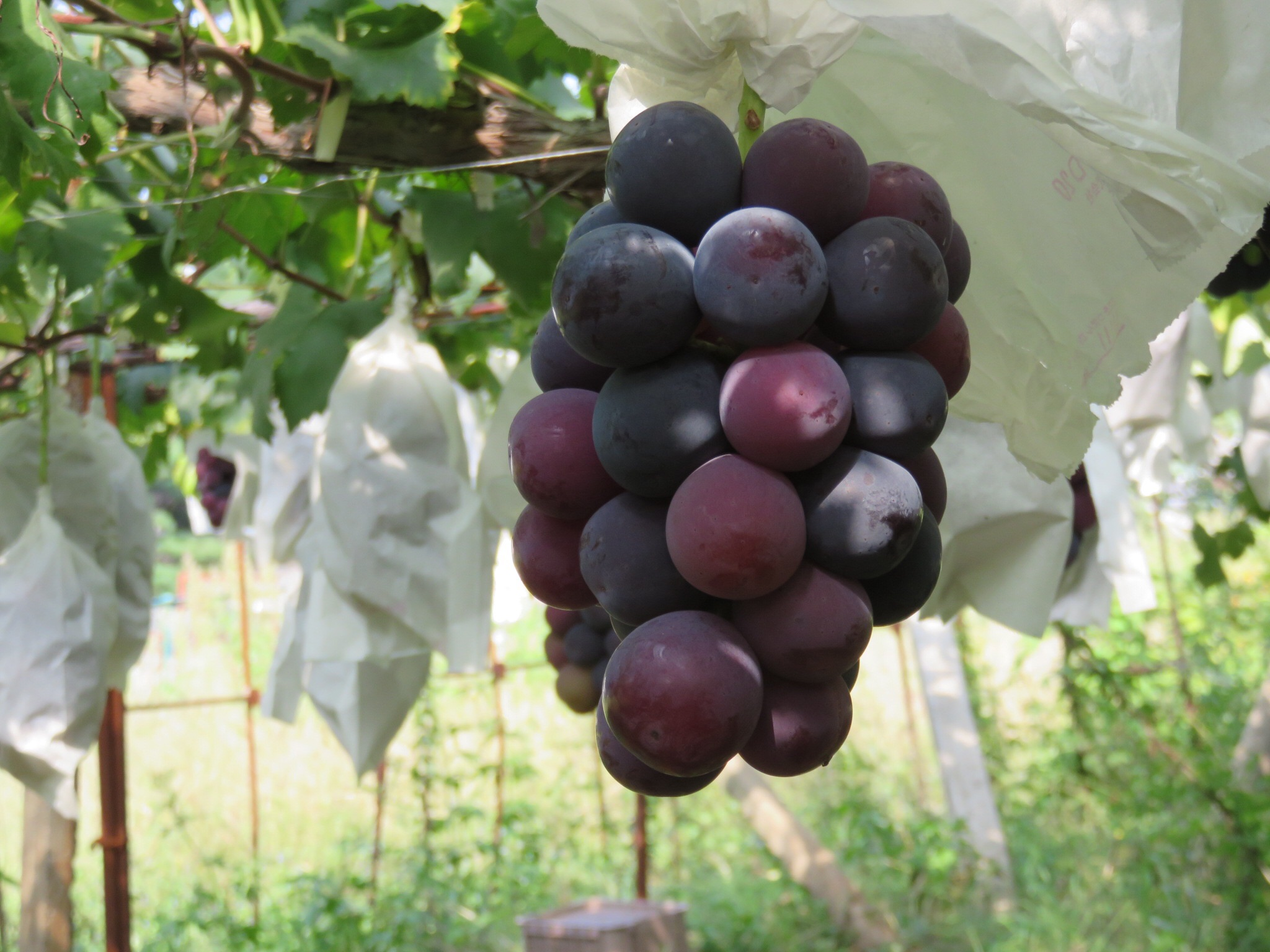
- Pione Grapes, Koshu, Yamanashi, September 2015
- Color of berry skin: Purple
- Origin: Japan
- Pedigree parent 1: Kyoho
- Pedigree parent 2: Cannon Hall Muscat
- Notable regions: Yamanashi Prefecture, Nagano Prefecture
- Year of selection: 1957
- VIVC number: 9291

Pione (ピオーネ pione) is a large-berried, purple skinned, table and rosé wine grape variety that has been grown in Japan since 1957.

== Table and wine producing grape ==
First developed in Shizuoka Prefecture by Hideo Ikawa, the grape is a hybrid tetraploid cultivar of the widely planted Kyoho and Cannon Hall Muscat grapes. Kyoho is itself a red fruited hybrid developed in Japan in 1937. The Cannon Hall Muscat is a large white table grape connected to seed originally brought from Greece in 1813, by John Spencer Stanhope resident of Cannon Hall near Barnsley, South Yorkshire, England.

The cultivar is noted for its large, generally seedless, purple skinned fruit. It is grown in Okayama, Hiroshima, Nagano and Yamanashi Prefectures and ranks third behind Kyoho and Delaware in terms of total volume of table grape production in Japan.

It commands a price premium as a table grape, but is also occasionally used to produce rosé single varietal wine.
