= Koshu (grape) =

Variety of grape

- Grape (Vitis)
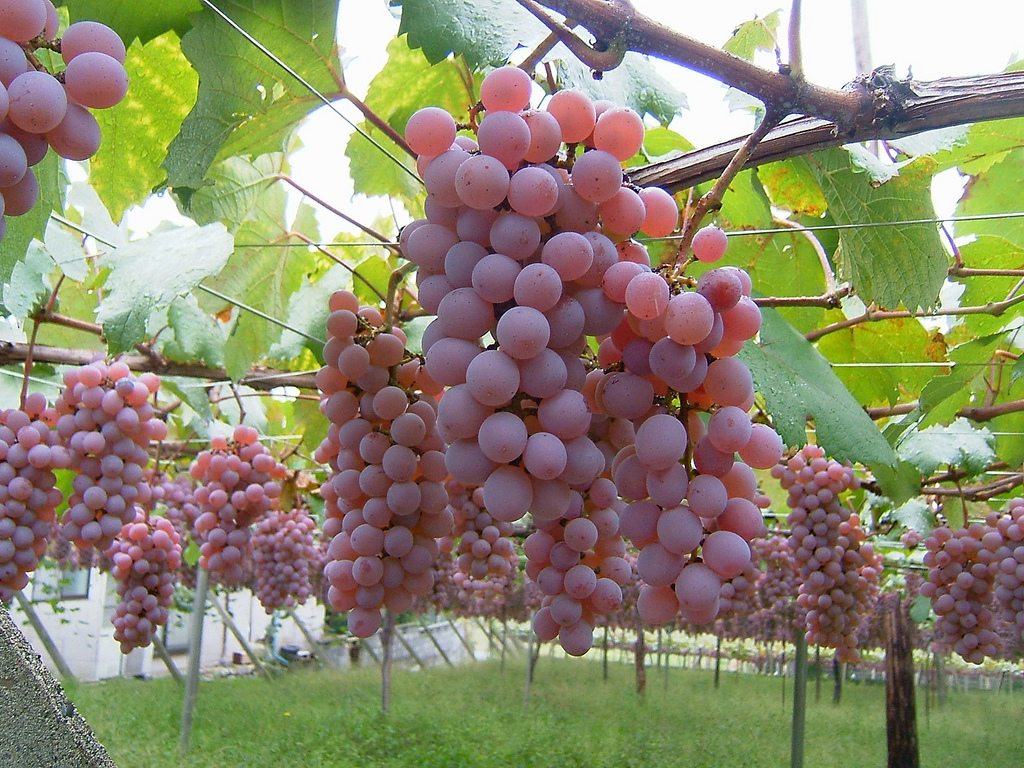
- Koshu grape
- Color of berry skin: Red
- Species: Vitis vinifera
- Notable regions: Koshu Valley
- VIVC number: 6427

Wine characteristics
- Cool climate: citrus, peach and jasmine.

Koshu (甲州 kōshū) is a white wine grape variety that has been grown primarily in the Koshu Valley in Yamanashi Prefecture, Japan. Though long thought to be of exclusively European origin, it is now known to be a hybrid (probably naturally occurring) of Europe's Vitis vinifera and one or more East Asian Vitis species. The name “Koshu” is a former name for Yamanashi and the present-day name of the main town in the valley where the majority of Koshu grapes are grown.

== Wine characteristics ==
The distinctive characteristics of Koshu are a pale straw colour and a soft, fruity and aromatic bouquet with overtones of citrus, peach and jasmine. The taste is clean, delicate and fresh, considered a good match for Japanese cuisine.

== Wine production ==
In the late 19th century, the first proper winery was established in Yamanashi. After the second half of the 20th century, production of Japanese Wine from locally grown grapes increased dramatically. There are now more than 80 wineries in Yamanashi Prefecture; they turn out about 40% of Japan's domestic wine production, and Yamanashi has 95% of the Koshu plantings in the country.
