= Cardinal (grape) =

Variety of grape

- Grape (Vitis)
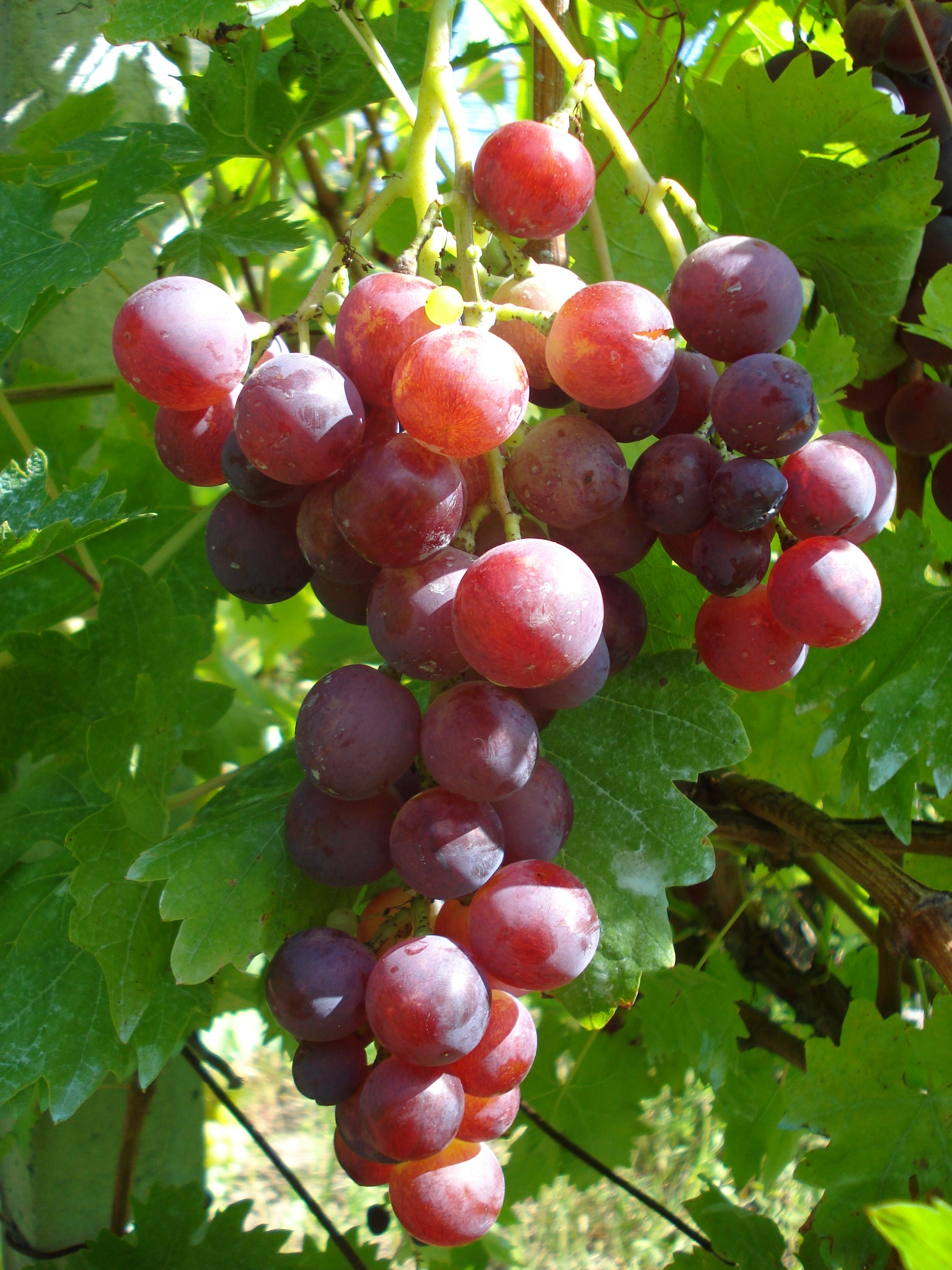
- Cardinal grape cluster grown in Medjimurje County wine subregion, northern Croatia
- Color of berry skin: Rose
- Species: Vitis vinifera
- Also called: Red cardinal
- Origin: California
- VIVC number: 2091

Cardinal is a table grape variety first produced in California in 1939.

The grape is a cross of the Königin der Weingärten and Alphonse-lavallée table grapes, according to latest research. In the United States, Bulgaria, North Macedonia, Croatia, France, Italy, Romania, Spain, and Portugal the grape is used as a typical table grape for eating and making raisins. In Thailand and Vietnam it is used widely in wine production. It is the main parent of the Blanc du Bois subtropical wine grape.

The cultivation of the variety was introduced in the Philippines in the 1970s where it is mainly grown in the Ilocos region.
