= Table grape =

Grapes intended for consumption while fresh

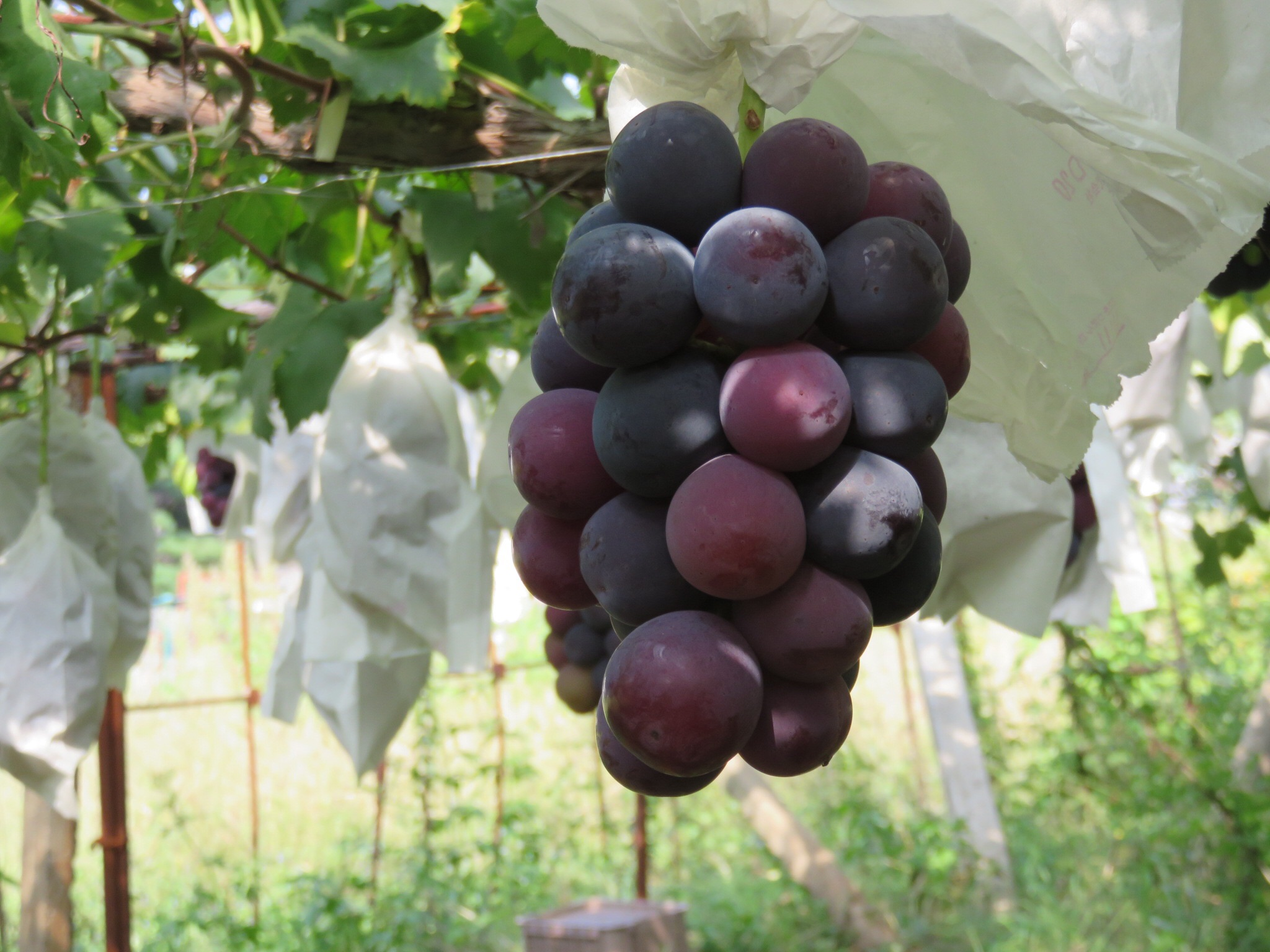
Pione table grapes before harvesting

Table grapes are grapes intended for consumption as fresh fruit, as opposed to grapes grown for wine production, juice production, jelly and jam making, or for drying into raisins.

Vitis vinifera table grapes appear in seeded or non-seeded varietals and range widely in terms of colour, size, sweetness and adaptability to local growing conditions. Common commercially available table grape varieties such as Thompson Seedless and Flame Seedless are favoured by growers for their high yield and relative resistance to damage during shipment. Other less common varietals such as Cotton Candy, Kyoho or Pione are custom hybrids bred for size, appearance, and specific flavour characteristics.

== Market characteristics ==
Chile, Peru, the United States, China, Turkey, Spain, South Africa and Australia are major producers and exporters of table grapes. World table grape production in 2016 is estimated by the USDA to be around 21.0 million metric tons per annum, China alone accounting for an estimated 9.7 million metric tons. Chile remains the world's single largest table grape exporter, exporting over 800,000 metric tons to mainly North American and European markets. China exports only 247,000 metric tons per annum, mainly to South East Asian markets.

The global trade in table grapes has enjoyed strong growth since the 1950s. Since the turn of the century, table grape export growth has primarily come from the Southern Hemisphere and developing economies such as Chile, India, Peru and Turkey.

The international trade in table grapes has benefitted from the increased availability of cold storage and refrigerated container technology. Table grapes are a labour-intensive agricultural product that require harvesting by hand at peak ripeness. To maintain product quality at point of sale, harvested grapes must be sorted, packaged and cooled to near 0 °C as quickly as possible. Transportation in ventilated and temperature-controlled environments requires investment in processing facilities, shipping and logistics. The production cycle for table grapes is relatively long compared with other fruit; new plantations take two to three years to become productive, so export production and promotion is often concentrated in the hands of large vertically integrated commercial enterprises or producer-exporter associations such as the Fruit Exporters Association of Chile (ASOEX).

=== North America and Europe ===
Table grapes commonly sold in North American and European markets include Sultana (Thompson Seedless), Flame, Muscat, Almeria, Niagara and Concord.

In the United States, California remains the largest single producer of table grapes with over 85,000 acres under cultivation. According to the USDA over 70 varietals are grown in the state, but the bulk of shipments are limited to a dozen mainly seedless varieties often sold domestically under generic green, red, or black descriptors.

=== Japan, Korea and East Asia ===
In Japan, Korea and other East Asian markets, as well as supporting a market for imported grapes commonly produced in Australia and Chile, domestically produced table grapes are often grown and sold as premium gift products.

In Japan, Kyoho, Delaware and Pione grapes rank as the first, second and third most popular table grapes in terms of production volume. In July 2015, setting new pricing records for Japanese premium table grapes, a single bunch of Ruby Roman grapes, containing 26 grapes at a weight of about 700 grams, sold for 1 million yen (around US$8400).

In the Philippines, most table grapes in the country are imported, although grapes can be cultivated in the islands. In the Ilocos region, the red cardinal is the most commonly grown variety.

== Varietals ==
Colour	Varietals
White-Green grapes	Perlette, Sugraone, Thompson Seedless, Niagara, Calmeria, Italia, Autumn King, Princess, Cotton Candy, Shine Muscat
Red grapes	Flame Seedless, Swenson Red, Yates, Red Globe, Ruby Seedless, Christmas Rose, Emperor, Rouge, Crimson Seedless, Tudor Premium Red, Scarlet Royal, Cardinal, Koshu, Delaware, Ruby Roman, Vintage Red, Muscato
Blue-Black grapes	Beauty Seedless, Concord, Thomcord, Muscat Hamburg, Autumn Royal, Fantasy Seedless, Marroo, Niabell, Summer Royal, Kyoho, Pione, St. Theresa

=== Gallery ===
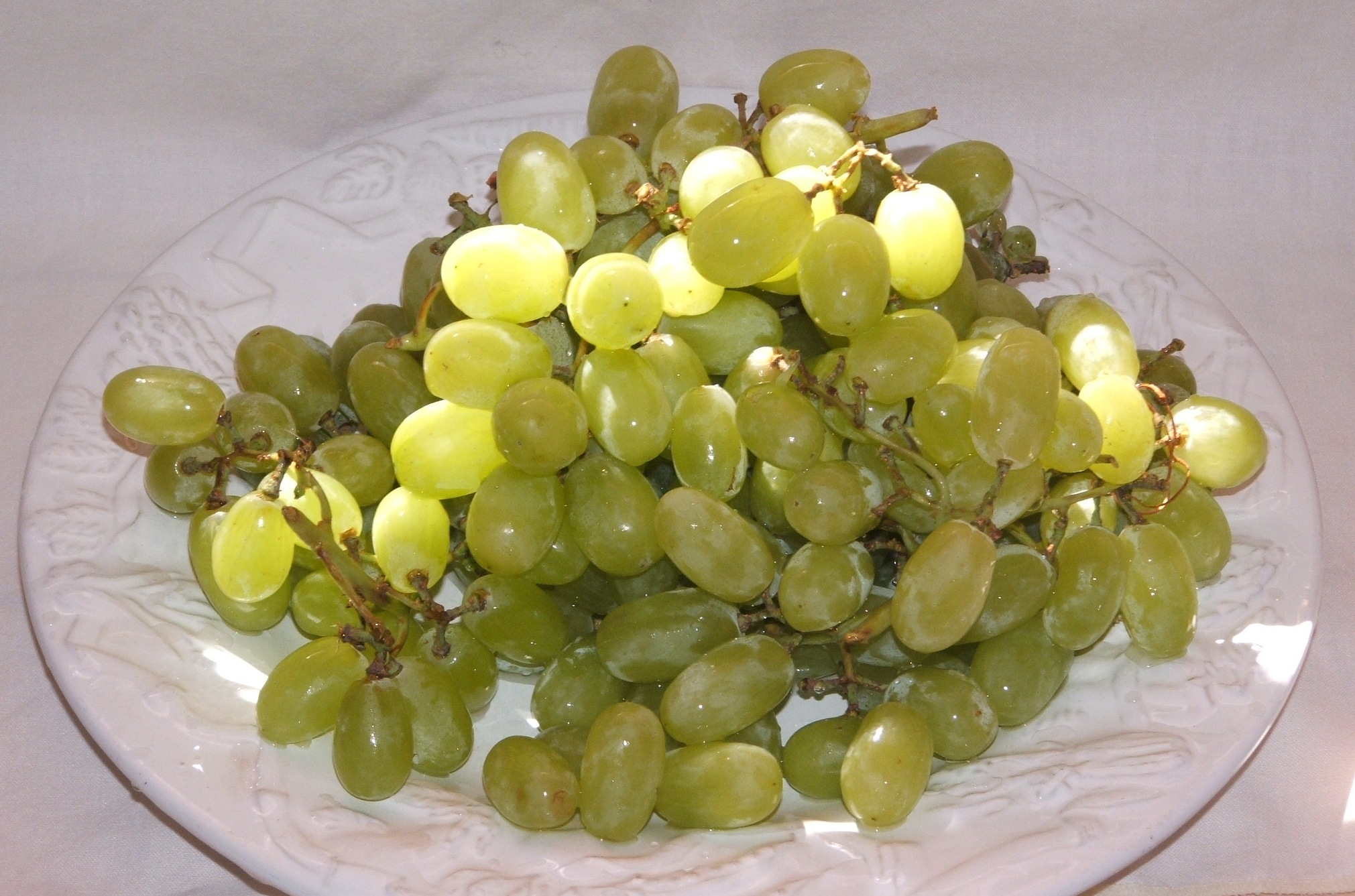
Sultana (Thompson Seedless) table grapes

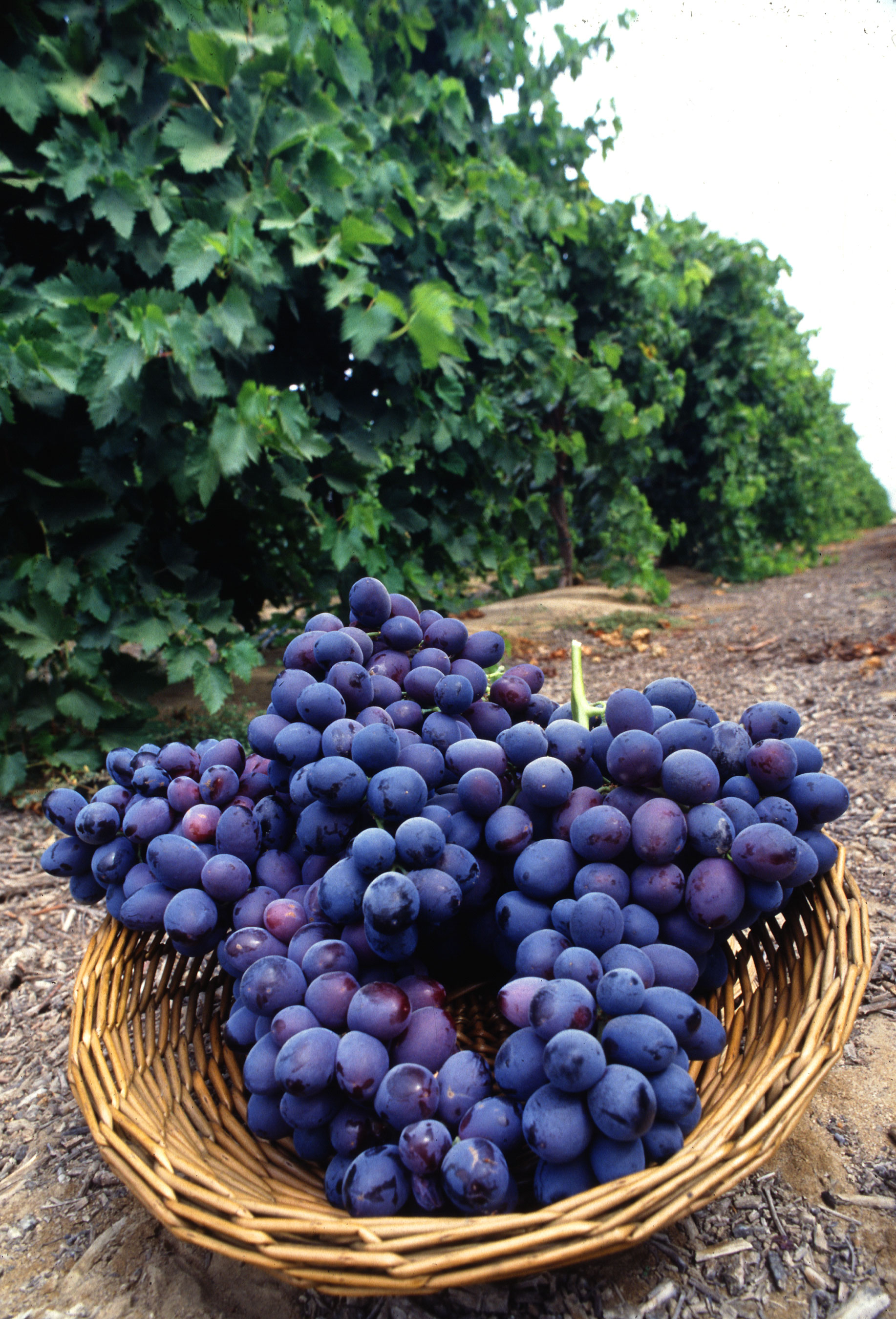
Autumn Royal table grapes California

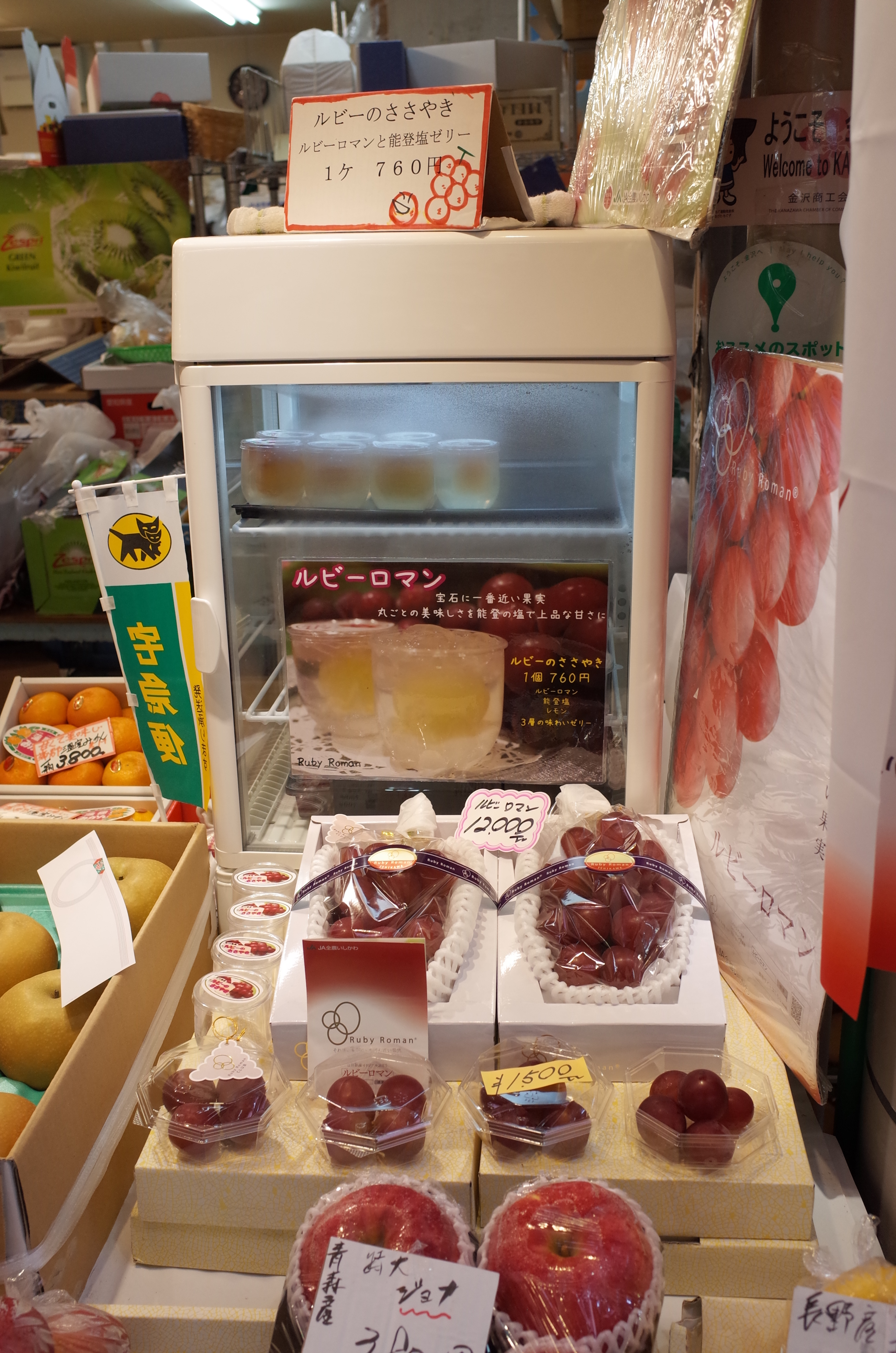
Ruby Roman grapes for sale in Kanazawa, Ishikawa Prefecture

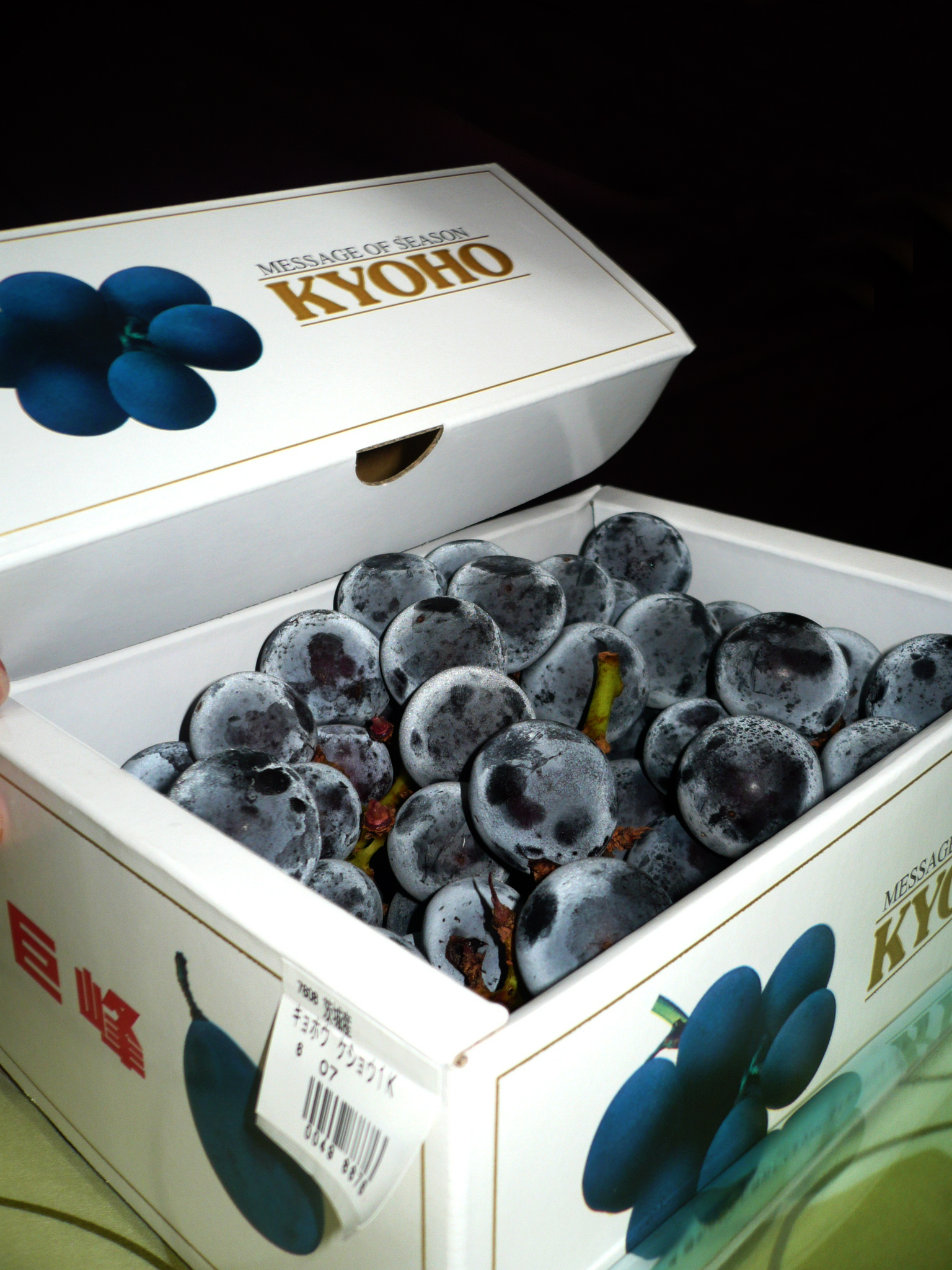
Kyoho grapes

== See also ==
- Table apple
