= Kyoho (grape) =

Variety of grape

- Grape (Vitis)
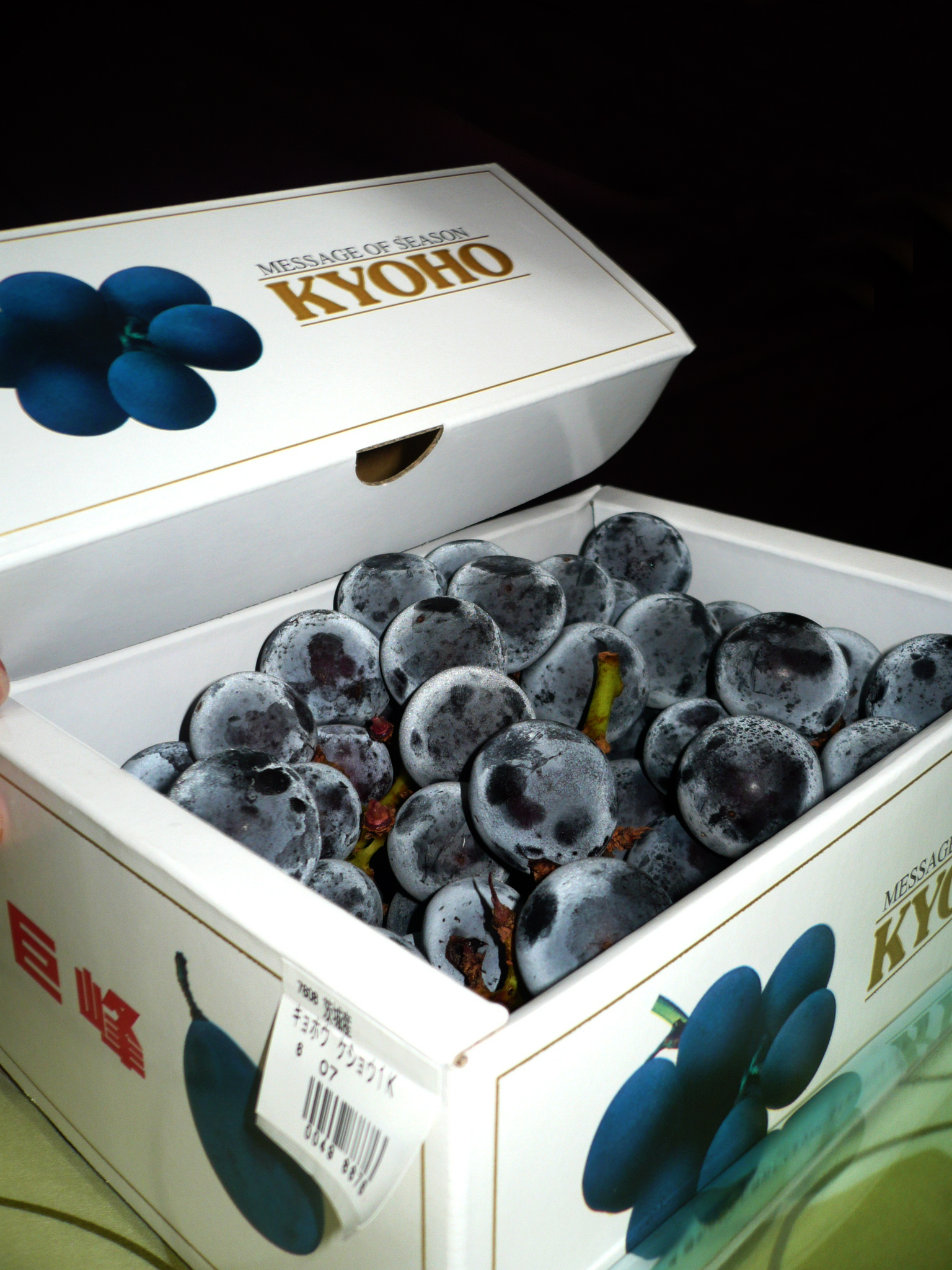
- Kyoho grapes
- Color of berry skin: Black
- Origin: Japan
- Pedigree parent 1: Ishiharawase
- Pedigree parent 2: Centennial
- Notable regions: Nagano, Yamanashi, Japan
- Breeder: Yasushi Ōinoue
- Breeding institute: Ōinoue Institute for Agronomical & Biological Science
- Year of crossing: 1937
- Year of selection: 1942
- Year of protection: 1955
- Formation of seeds: Complete
- Sex of flowers: Hermaphrodite
- VIVC number: 6597

Kyoho grapes (巨峰葡萄, Kyohō budō; lit. 'giant mountain grape'") are the most planted grapes in the world by area. They are a variety of hybrid grape popular in East Asia. The fruits are blackish-purple, or almost black, with large seeds and juicy flesh with high sugar content and mild acidity. The variety was first produced by the Japanese viniculturist Yasushi Ohinoue in the 1930s and 1940s by crossing Ishiharawase and Centennial grape varieties (Vitis vinifera × Vitis labrusca).

== Features ==
Kyoho is a tetraploid grape variety, as its breeding parents, ‘Ishiharawase’ and ‘Centennial’, are tetraploid bud sports of ‘Campbell Early’ (V. labrusca) and ‘Rosaki’ (V. vinifera), respectively. Like the Concord, Kyoho is a slip-skin variety, meaning that the skin is easily separated from the fruit. The seeds are bitter and the skin is traditionally not eaten. The grape maintains some of the flavor qualities of the Concord, known to consumers from the flavor of most grape jellies and Concord grape juice.

Kyoho grapes were first produced in 1937 in Shizuoka Prefecture. They were given their present name in 1946. They are popular in Japan, Taiwan, China, and Korea for their size and very sweet flesh. They are traditionally served peeled as a dessert, and the juice is used in making chūhai cocktails. Areas of production include Nagano Prefecture and Yamanashi Prefecture in Japan, California's Central Valley, Changhua County in Taiwan, and Chile.

In 2015, Kyoho was the world's most cultivated grape variety by land area, at 365,000 ha. More than 90% of the vines are in China.
