= Sultana (grape) =

"chartreuse" (pale green), oval seedless grape variety

- Grape (Vitis)
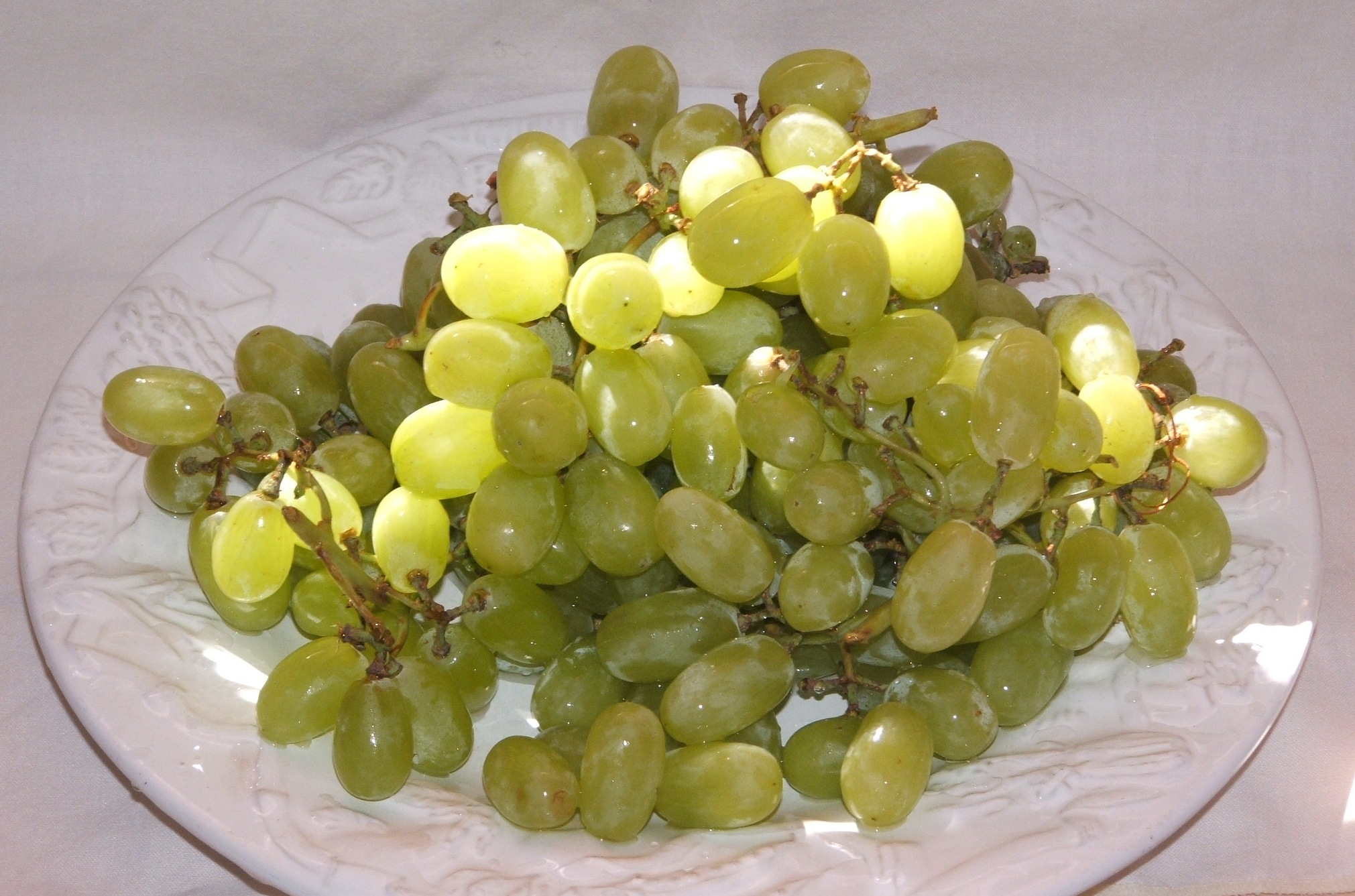
- Sultana (Thompson Seedless) grapes
- Color of berry skin: Chartreuse
- Species: Vitis vinifera
- Also called: sultanina, Thompson Seedless, Lady de Coverly, oval-fruited Kishmish, İzmir üzümü
- Notable regions: Aegean Region, Turkey
- VIVC number: 12051

The sultana is a "white" (pale green), oval seedless grape variety also called the sultanina, Thompson Seedless (United States), Lady de Coverly (England), and oval-fruited Kishmish (Iran, Iraq, Palestine, Pakistan, Afghanistan, India). It is also known as a grape found in İzmir, or Manisa in Turkey, since this variety has been extensively grown in the region around those cities. It is assumed to originate from Asia Minor, which later became part of the Ottoman Empire.

In some countries, especially Commonwealth countries, the name sultana is used for the raisin made from it or larger seedless grapes; such sultana raisins are often called sultanas or sultanis.

== History ==
The Ottomans took the sultana grape variety to the island of Crete in the 19th century.

== Etymology ==
Thompson Seedless refers to William Thompson, a viticulturist who was an early grower in California and is sometimes credited with introducing the variety. According to the U.S. Code of Federal Regulations, the two names are synonymous. Virtually all of California raisin production (about 97% in 2000) and roughly one-third of California's total grape area is of this variety, making it the single most widely planted variety. Before Thompson Seedless became dominant, Muscat of Alexandria was a primary raisin grape in California.

== Raisins ==
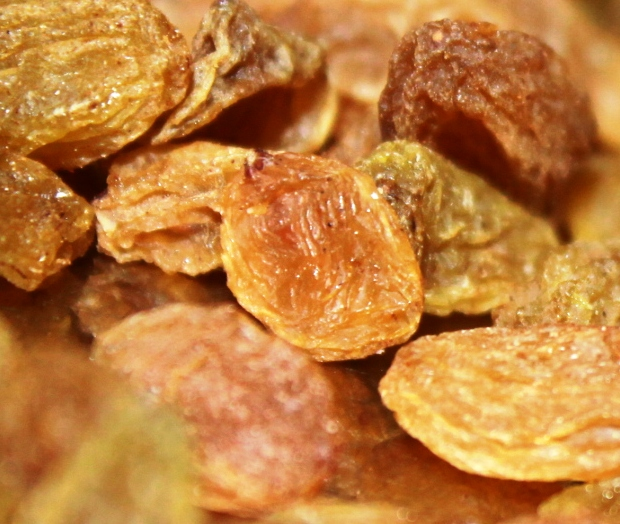
Close-up of golden sultana raisins

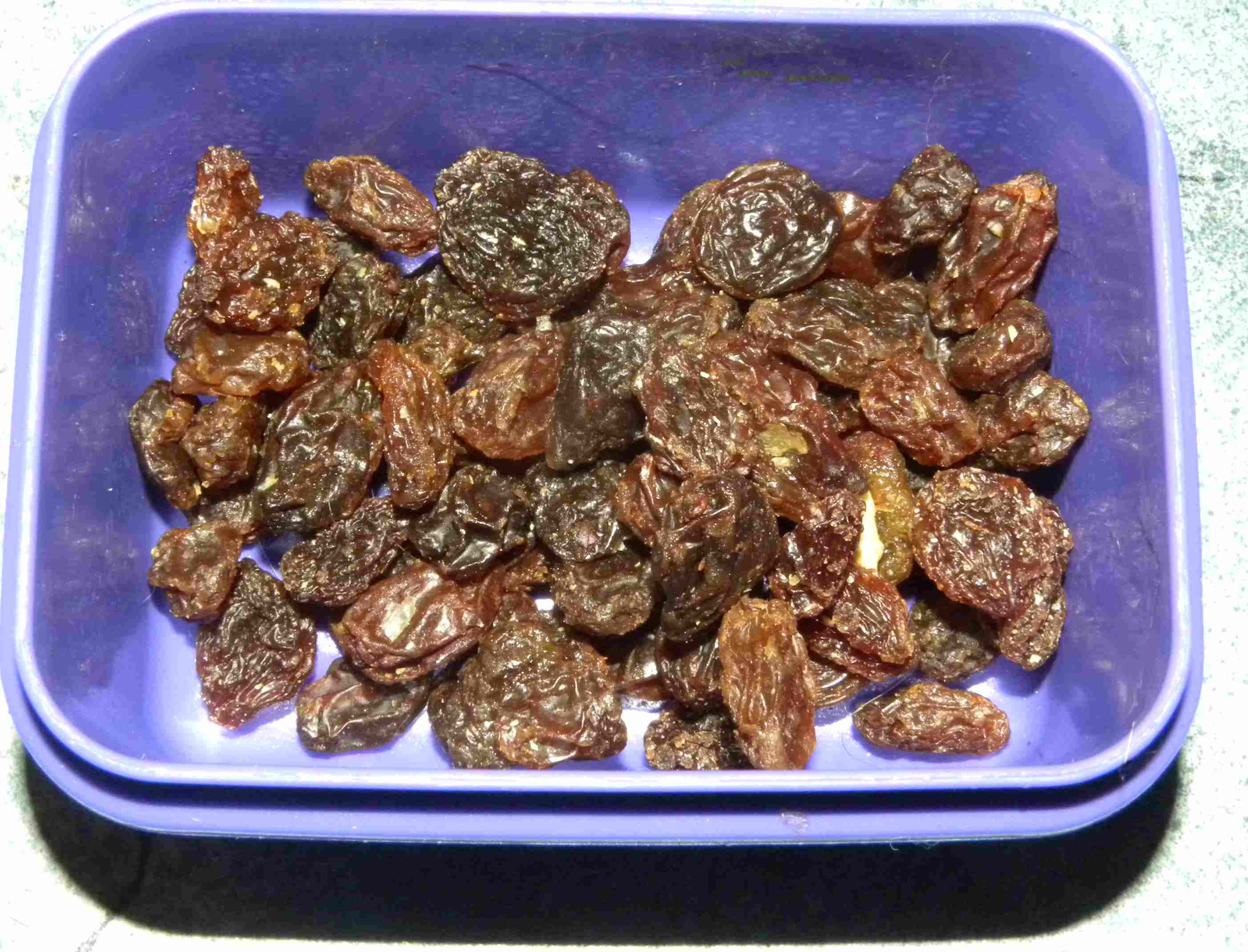
Dark sultana raisins

In the United States, most raisins, including those with the typical dark brown color, are made from the sultana grape, the Thompson Seedless. The term "sultana" refers to golden-colored dried grapes, which may also be called "golden raisins" (such as marketed by Sun-Maid, a California-based raisin grape growers' co-op and legacy brand). Any color of grape may be used to produce golden raisins, and any kind of golden raisins from any kind of grape may be marketed as "sultanas". The golden raisin color comes from a treatment with sulfur dioxide rather than traditional drying and preservation methods. Most nonorganic sultana grapes in California and elsewhere are treated with the growth-inducing plant hormone gibberellin. In other grapes, gibberellin is released by the seeds.

== Other uses ==
The sultana grape is also used to make white wine, in which use it is known for its "sweet blandness". It is referred to as a "three-way grape" because it is used as a table grape, to make raisins and to make wine. In the United States, it is the base for wine generically called "chablis". This wine is named for the Chablis region of France, but it is not a true Chablis wine. In the European Union, "Chablis" wine must be made from the Chardonnay grape produced in the region of the Yonne département.

End uses include:

- Manufacturing industries such as bakeries and breakfast cereal producers
- Supermarkets
- Dairy products such as yogurt and ice-creams
- Salads and desserts

Its triple use has made the Thompson Seedless the most planted grape in California.

Sultana grape juice was fraudulently sold as being of Chardonnay grapes in Australia for winemaking, as Sultana grapes cost less. The fraud was discovered in 2003 by the Australian Wine and Brandy Corporation. It was considered the largest case of wine deception in Australian history.

=== Sultaniye wines ===
Sultaniye wines are dry and semi-dry, light-bodied wines produced in Turkey. Sultaniye grapes used in winemaking are mainly grown at Denizli and Manisa in the Aegean Region of Turkey. Sultaniye grapes are consumed as table grapes and raisins and used in winemaking. The Semillon and Sultaniye wines from the Marmara region of Turkey attract attention not only in the local market but also in international markets.

=== Sultaniye Rakı ===
Sultaniye is the most common variety for rakı production due to its high volume of cultivation and traditional taste. Also, in recent years, due to increasing market demand for product differentiation, companies led to use various varieties and methods to gain competitive advantage in the growing sector of Turkish alcoholic beverages. This trend emerges from the desire to revive old, rare, and local varieties.
