= Pennsylvania wine =

Pennsylvania
- Wine region
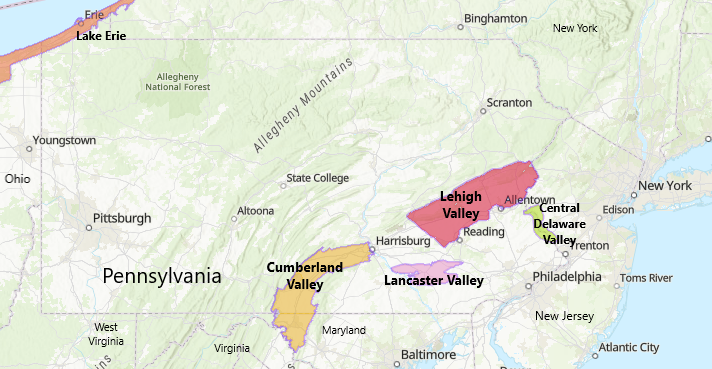
- Pennsylvania AVAs
- Official name: Commonwealth of Pennsylvania
- Type: U.S. State Appellation
- Year established: 1787
- Country: United States
- Sub-regions: Central Delaware Valley AVA, Cumberland Valley AVA, Lake Erie AVA, Lancaster Valley AVA, Lehigh Valley AVA
- Climate region: Continental in AVA's, also humid subtropical in extreme SE lowlands
- Total area: 44,743 square miles (28,635,520 acres)
- Grapes produced: Aurore, Baco noir, Barbera, Cabernet Foch, Cabernet Franc, Cabernet Sauvignon, Carmine, Catawba, Cayuga, Chambourcin, Chancellor, Chardonel, Chardonnay, Chelois, Concord, Corvina, De Chaunac, Delaware, Diamond, Dolcetto, Dornfelder, Edelweiss, Fredonia, Geisenheim, Gewürztraminer, Isabella, Lemberger, Leon Millot, Malvasia, Marechal Foch, Merlot, Niagara, Noiret, Norton, Petit Verdot, Pinot blanc, Pinot gris, Pinot Meunier, Pinot noir, Primitivo, Rayon d'Or, Riesling, Rougeon, Sangiovese, Sauvignon blanc, Seyval blanc, Siegfried, St. Vincent, Steuben, Syrah, Tocai Friulano, Traminette, Vidal blanc, Vignoles, Villard blanc, Villard noir, Viognier
- No. of wineries: 119

Pennsylvania wine refers to wine made from grapes grown in the U.S. state appellation of Pennsylvania and is the eighth-largest wine producing state in the country. The climate is mild compared to surrounding states, with the moderating effects of Lake Erie to the north and the Atlantic Ocean to the east. One hundred and nineteen wineries are located in all parts of the state, including five designated American Viticultural Areas.

== History ==
The commercial wine industry had important roots in Pennsylvania. Around 1740, the first hybrid of vitis vinifera European grapes and vitis labrusca North American grapes was discovered near Philadelphia. It was initially named Alexander, after the gardener who discovered it. In 1786, Frenchman Pierre 'Peter' Legaux founded the Pennsylvania Vine Company, just outside of Philadelphia, the nation's first commercial vineyard.
