= Lehigh Valley AVA =

American Viticultural Area in Pennsylvania

Coordinates: 39°06′41″N 74°52′31″W

Lehigh Valley
- Wine region
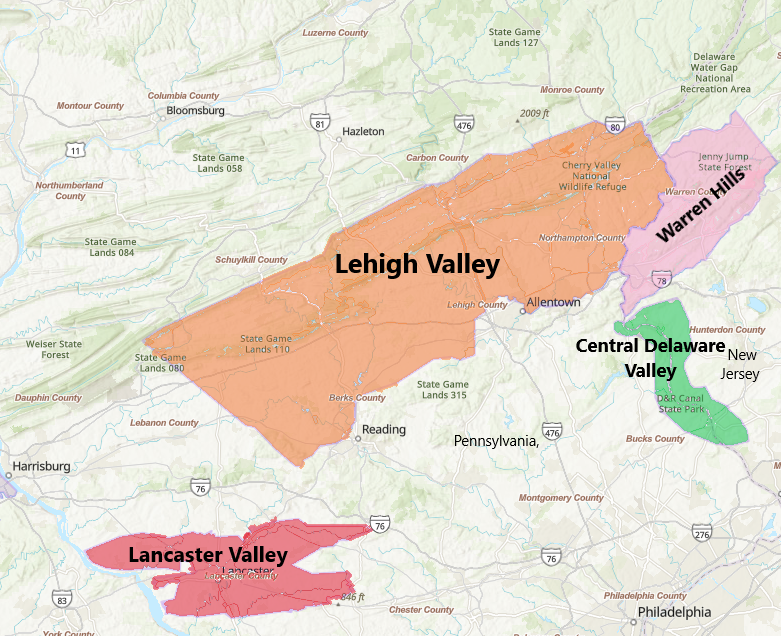
- Map of the Lehigh Valley AVA in eastern Pennsylvania
- Type: American Viticultural Area
- Year established: 2008
- Years of wine industry: 52
- Country: United States
- Part of: Pennsylvania
- Other regions in Pennsylvania: Cumberland Valley AVA, Central Delaware Valley AVA, Lake Erie AVA, Lancaster Valley AVA
- Growing season: 161 to 180 days
- Climate region: Region II
- Heat units: 2,601–3,000 GDD units
- Precipitation (annual average): 17.8 to 21.7 in (451–550 mm)
- Soil conditions: Shale, sandstone and siltstone
- Total area: 1.2 million acres (1,888 sq mi)
- Size of planted vineyards: 230 acres (93 ha)
- No. of vineyards: 13
- Grapes produced: Baco Noir, Cabernet Franc, Cabernet Sauvignon, Catawba, Cayuga, Chambourcin, Chardonnay, Concord, De Chaunac, Dolcetto, Gewürztraminer, Grüner Veltliner, Lemberger, Leon Millot, Marechal Foch, Marquette, Merlot, Niagara, Petite Sirah, Pinot Gris / Grigio, Pinot Noir, Regent, Riesling, Sangiovese, Seyval Blanc, Steuben, Syrah / Shiraz, Traminette, Valvin Muscat, Vidal Blanc, Vignoles/Ravat, Zweigelt
- No. of wineries: 11

Lehigh Valley is an American Viticultural Area (AVA) area located in the Lehigh Valley region of southeastern Pennsylvania encompasses portions of Lehigh, Northampton, Berks, Schuylkill, Carbon, and Monroe Counties, the towns between Jim Thorpe to Easton, the landforms of Schuylkill River Valley and the Brodhead and Swatara Creek watersheds to the west. It was established as the nation's 188^{th} and the state's fifth wine appellation on March 11, 2008, by the Alcohol and Tobacco Tax and Trade Bureau (TTB), Treasury after reviewing the petition submitted by John Skrip III, chairman of the Lehigh Wine Trail Appellation Committee, proposing the viticultural area named "Lehigh Valley."

The 1.2-million-acre (1,888 sq mi) viticultural area is a long valley bordered by Second Mountain to the north and a loose range of mountains known as South Mountain to the south. Measuring approximately 92 miles (148 km) in length on the northern border by about 56 miles (90 km) in length on the southern front. The eastern border measures nearly 24 miles (39 km) and the western border equates to approximately 28 miles (45 km). The area is bounded by the Delaware River in the east and the Berks-Lebanon county line in the west located approximately 45 miles (72 km) north-northwest of Philadelphia and does not overlap any other viticultural area.

The wine region cultivates 230 acres (93 ha) of vineyards, planted with several Vitis vinifera and French-American hybrid grape varieties. Lehigh Valley climate is said to be comparable to the cool climates of Central and Northern Europe, favoring the production of French-American hybrid grapes, namely Chambourcin. Between fifteen and twenty percent of the wine produced in Pennsylvania is made from grapes grown in the Lehigh Valley region. The region has a humid continental climate (Dfa-Dfb in higher areas) and the plant hardiness zone range is 6a to 7a.

== History ==
Lehigh Valley derives its name from the Lehigh River, which flows through the viticultural area and into the Delaware River at Easton, Pennsylvania. The word "Lehigh" originated with the Lenapes in the 1600s, who named the area "Lechauwekink," meaning an area with "river forks." The petitioner notes that through a series of translations of the original Lenape name, the name "Lehigh" now identifies the area.

== Terroir ==
=== Topography ===
The topography of the Lehigh Valley viticultural area largely consists of rolling hills with elevations generally between 500 and 1,000 feet (150 and 300 m), according to the petitioner and the provided USGS maps. Creeks and several rivers flow through the region, while lakes dot the landscape, as shown on the USGS maps of the region. Also, a small portion of the northeastern boundary area, along the foothills of the Blue Mountain range, rises to the 1,600-foot (490 m) contour line. The Appalachian National Scenic Trail meanders through the area's higher elevations, as shown on the USGS maps.

Beyond the northern boundary of the viticultural area, the terrain transitions from the lower, rolling hills of the Lehigh Valley to higher foothills and mountains with elevations ranging from 1,000 to 1,900 feet (300 to 580 m). While the region southeast of the viticultural area begins on the heights of South Mountain, the region quickly falls to the lower and flatter elevations of the Delaware River valley. These features contrast with the regions to the north and south of the viticultural area, according to the petitioner. To document these differences, the petitioner uses data collected from 1961 to 1996 by the United States Department of Agriculture (USDA) and its Natural Resources Conservation Service (NRCS). In addition, the petitioner submitted maps of Pennsylvania with information on soil moisture, soil temperature, frost-free periods, and agro-climatic regions.

=== Geology ===
The geology of the Lehigh Valley viticultural area, as depicted on the Geologic Map of Pennsylvania, Commonwealth of Pennsylvania, Conservation and Natural Resources, Bureau of Topographic and Geologic Survey, revised in 2000, includes Ordovician features in the south and Permian features in the north. The Ordovician geology, predominantly consisting of shale, limestone, dolomite, and sandstone, dates back 430 million to 500 million years. The Permian geology, dating back 250 million to 290 million years, consists of coal, in addition to the sandstone, shale, and limestone that is similar to that found in the Ordovician geology to the south of the viticultural area.

=== Soils ===
The soils within the Lehigh Valley viticultural area are mainly based on shale, sandstone, and siltstone. A 1972 Soil Conservation Service publication, General Soil Map-Pennsylvania, verifies that the area contains shale, sandstone, and siltstone. Soils to the south of the area, according to the petitioner, are based on schist, gneiss, and porcelanite, rather than shale, limestone, and sandstone. According to data submitted by the petitioner, a lack of soil moisture during the growing season puts the Lehigh Valley viticultural area in the Typic Udic moisture regime (less than 90 days of drying), as determined by USGS and NRCS data and shown on the Soil Moistures Regimes of Pennsylvania Landscapes map. The petitioner explains that the region typically has a June through August dry season when the grape vines rely on stored moisture rather than rain. The estimated annual mean soil temperature of the viticultural area is Typic Mesic, ranging from 50.9 to 54 °F (10.5 to 12.2 °C). This information is based on temperatures at 20 inches (510 mm) below the soil surface and shown on the Soil Moistures Regimes of Pennsylvania Landscapes map.

=== Climate ===
The agricultural-climatic features of the Lehigh Valley viticultural area include heat accumulation measurements of 2,601 to 3,000 annual degree days and an annual moisture surplus of 13.8 to 17.7 in (351 to 450 mm) of water, as shown on the Agro-Climate Regions of Pennsylvania map submitted with the petition. As a measurement of heat accumulation during the growing season, one degree day accumulates for each degree Fahrenheit that a day's mean temperature is above 50 degrees, which is the minimum temperature required for grapevine growth. The USGS and the NRCS integrate degree-days and annual moisture surplus data to identify regions of relatively homogeneous heat and moisture characteristics related to crop production.

== Viticulture ==
The appellation encompasses an area of approximately 1888 square miles, 1.2 million acres, of which 70% is suitable for premium winegrapes. Commercial grape growing started in the Lehigh Valley viticultural area in 1974, the petition notes, when Vynecrest Winery and Clover Hill Winery started planting grapes. Two years later, Franklin Hill Winery planted grapes Bangor in Northampton County. As of 2024, there are eleven licensed wineries and 13 vineyards growing a total of at least 220 acres (89 ha) of grapes. The list of wineries within the AVA, i.e., Amoré Vineyards, Big Creek Vineyard, Blue Mountain Vineyard and Cellars, Cherry Valley Vineyards, Clover Hill Vineyards & Winery, Franklin Hill Vineyards, Galen Glen Vineyard & Winery, Pinnacle Ridge Winery, Sorrenti Family Cherry Valley Vineyard, Tolino Vineyards, Vynecrest Winery and Weathered Vineyards. Together, the wineries comprised the Lehigh Valley Wine Trail. The closest vineyard and winery outside of the region lies in the town of Manatawny, Pennsylvania and is about 10 mi (16 km) south of the AVA in Berks county. The region houses similar agro-climatic conditions, geology, soil types, and topography. Conditions that make this area unique to grape growing and separate it from the surrounding land.
