= Lancaster Valley AVA =

American Viticultural Area in Pennsylvania

Coordinates: 40°10′51″N 76°26′07″W

Lancaster Valley
- Wine region
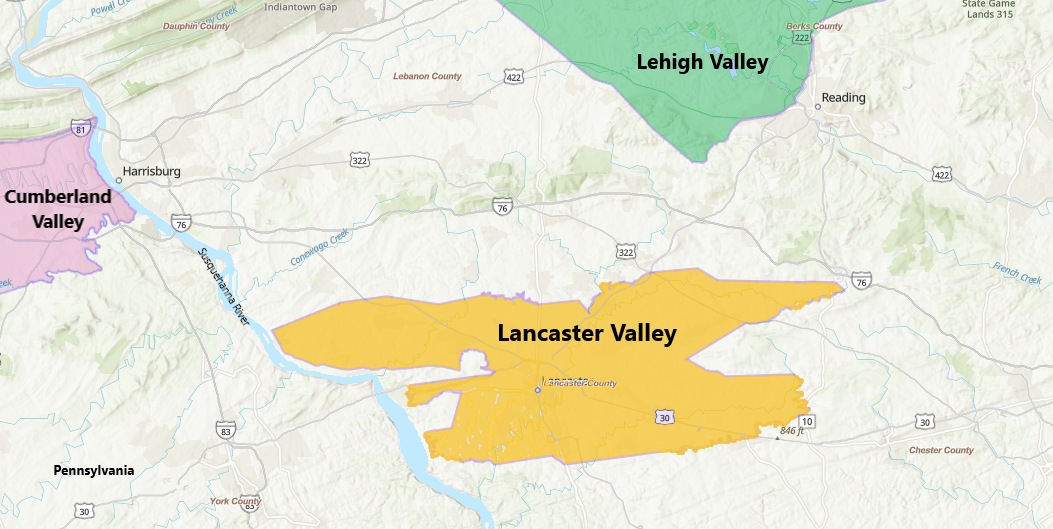
- Type: American Viticultural Area
- Year established: 1982
- Years of wine industry: 200
- Country: United States
- Part of: Pennsylvania
- Other regions in Pennsylvania: Central Delaware Valley AVA, Cumberland Valley AVA, Lake Erie AVA, Lehigh Valley AVA
- Climate region: Region III
- Heat units: 3,100 GDD units
- Precipitation (annual average): 41 in (1,000 mm); Snow: 5 in (13 cm)
- Soil conditions: Derived from limestone, including Conestoga, Beekmantown, Conococheague and Elbrook Limestones, and Ledger and Vintage dolomites
- Total area: 225,000 acres (352 sq mi)
- Size of planted vineyards: 400 acres (160 ha)
- No. of vineyards: 9
- Grapes produced: Cabernet Franc, Catawba, Cayuga, Chambourcin, Chancellor, Chardonnay, De Chaunac, Merlot, Niagara, Riesling, Seyval blanc, Vidal Blanc, Vignoles
- No. of wineries: 10

Lancaster Valley is an American Viticultural Area (AVA) located in Lancaster and Chester counties of southeastern Pennsylvania, centered around the city of Lancaster. The wine appellation was established as the nation's twelfth, the state's initial AVA on May 12, 1982 by the Bureau of Alcohol, Tobacco and Firearms (ATF), Treasury after reviewing the petition submitted by Mr. R. Martin Keen, proprietor of Conestoga Vineyards in Lancaster, on behalf of local vintners proposing a viticultural area named "Lancaster Valley."
The name "Lancaster Valley" is utilized by the Pennsylvania and United States Geological Surveys to describe the region in this viticultural area. The valley is located almost entirely within Lancaster County, founded in 1718, and Lancaster is the name of the largest city, founded in 1729, within the county and viticultural area.
Lancaster Valley is approximately 31 mi (50 km) long by 12 mi (19 km) wide, and contains about 225,000 acres (352 sq mi) cultivating about 400 acres (160 ha) under vine. Climate was not a factor in differentiating the Lancaster Valley viticultural area from surrounding areas. The valley is one of the most fertile agricultural areas in Pennsylvania, and features rich topsoil over limestone bedrock. It has a hot-summer humid continental climate (Dfa) and is located in plant hardiness zone 7a.

== History ==
Lancaster County has a long history of grape-growing. In "Climatic Factors and-the Potential for Wine-Grape Production in Several Areas of Pennsylvania," Carl W. Haeseler notes that early colonists planted wine grapes in several areas of southeastern Pennsylvania, including Middletown and York. By 1826. he states there were 150 acres (61 ha) of grapes, primarily Alexander, centered around York. with additional acreages in Adams, Chester, Lancaster and Westmoreland Counties. Haeseler further notes that although the grape industry in the area eventually succumbed to disease, "York and Lancaster Counties are considered among the starting places of American viticulture." The main causes of failure of the Old World grape were Phylloxera vastatrix, a soil-borne root louse, mildews, black rot, and quite likely, low winter temperatures. Hedrick stated, "Our northern climate is not well-suited to production of the Old World grape. As a species Vitis vinifera thrive best in climates equable in both temperature and humidity. The climate of eastern America is not equable."
The first grape vines in North East, Pennsylvania, were set out in 1850 by Messrs. Hammond and Griffith. The South Shore Winery was established in 1869 and lasted until 1914 or 1915, at which time its stock was sold to Grimshaw's Winery on Orchard Beach Road in North East. The latter winery was forced to close as a result of the 1917 Prohibition legislation.

Although Lancaster County was one area in which wine grapes were cultivated in the early part of the 19th Century, the area has not been known as a wine producing area until the 1970s. Since the early 1970s, two wineries have been bonded within the Lancaster Valley and, at the outset, there were approximately 41.5 acres (16.8 ha) of wine grapes in cultivation. These wineries grow grapes within the viticultural area and purchase additional grapes from within and outside of the area.

== Terroir ==
=== Geology ===
The topography and soils of the Lancaster Valley result from the geology of the area. The valley is a limestone bed that has been weathered to a gently rolling plain. The limestones found in the valley include Conestoga, Beekmantown, Conococheague and Elbrook limestones, with Ledger and Vintage dolomites. The hills and upland areas surrounding the Lancaster Valley are composed of harder rocks (quartzite, schist, gneiss, etc.) that are more resistant to erosion and weathering than the softer and more soluble limestones of the valley.

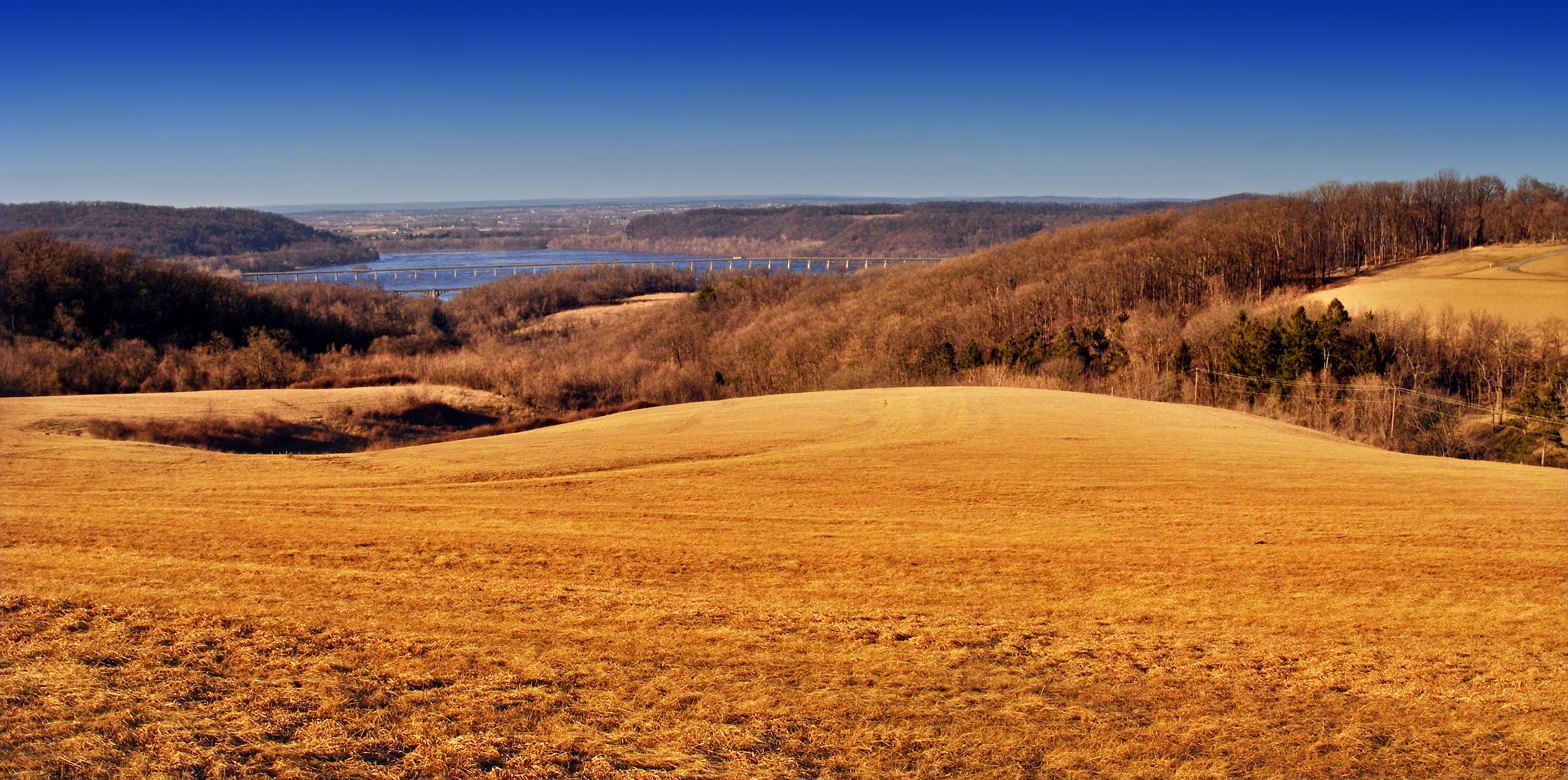
Lancaster Valley near the Susquehanna River

=== Topography ===
The petition established the Lancaster Valley viticultural area as a distinctive grape-growing region distinguished from surrounding areas on the basis of soil, topography and geology. Lancaster Valley is located in the Lancaster-Frederic Lowland. Its topography is a nearly level valley, averaging 400 feet (120 m) in elevation and decreasing in elevation from an average of 500 feet (150 m) at its eastern edge to 300 feet (91 m) at its western edge along the Susquehanna River. Lancaster Valley is bounded on the north, east and south by areas of higher elevation ranging from 100 to 600 feet (30–183 m) above the valley floor, and on the west by the Susquehanna River.

=== Soils ===
The valley is a limestone bed that has been weathered to a gently rolling plain. Soils found within Lancaster Valley are typical of those derived from limestone, and include Conestoga, Beekmantown, Conococheague and Elbrook Limestones, and Ledger and Vintage dolomites. These soils are deep, well drained, hold moisture well, and are highly productive. They contrast sharply with soils found in the hills and upland areas surrounding the Lancaster Valley. Generally, the surrounding soils are composed of harder rocks which are more resistant to erosion and less fertile than the limestone soils found within the Lancaster Valley. The deep fertile soils of the valley were formed from the insoluble and weathered products left from the decay of the parent limestones.
