= Grand River Valley AVA =

American Viticultural Area in Ohio

Coordinates: 41°44′34″N 81°00′29″W

Grand River Valley
- Wine region
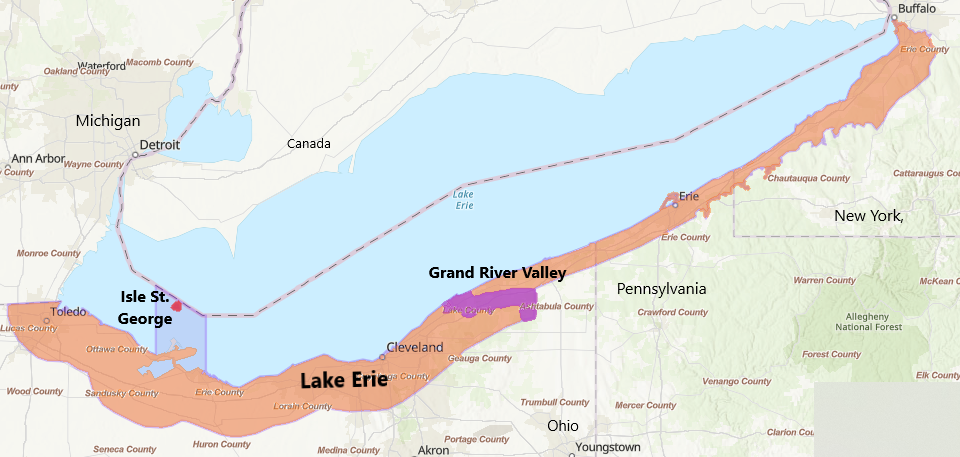
- Type: American Viticultural Area
- Year established: 1983
- Years of wine industry: 200
- Country: United States
- Part of: Ohio, Lake Erie AVA
- Other regions in Ohio, Lake Erie AVA: Isle St. George AVA
- Growing season: 170–185 days
- Climate region: Region I-II
- Precipitation (annual average): rain:42 in (1,067 mm) snow:35 in (889 mm)
- Soil conditions: Sedimentary, gravel, clay, slit, loess mix.
- Total area: 125,000 acres (195 sq mi)
- Size of planted vineyards: 1,300 acres (526 ha)
- No. of vineyards: 6
- Grapes produced: Barbera, Cabernet Franc, Cabernet Sauvignon, Catawba, Chambourcin, Chardonnay, Concord, De Chaunac, Gewurztraminer, Merlot, Niagara, Pinot gris, Pinot noir, Riesling, Semillon, Syrah, Vidal Blanc
- No. of wineries: 30

Grand River Valley is an American Viticultural Area (AVA) spread across portions of the Ashtabula, Lake, and Geauga Counties of northeastern Ohio located 45 miles (72 km) east of Cleveland. It was established as the nation's 50^{th} and the state's fourth appellation on October 21, 1983 by the Bureau of Alcohol, Tobacco and Firearms (ATF) of the Department of Treasury after reviewing the petition submitted by Mr. Anthony P. Debevec, President of Chalet Debonne Vineyards, Inc., a winery located in Madison, Ohio, proposing the viticultural area to be named "Grand River Valley."
The appellation lies entirely within the larger, multi-state Lake Erie AVA covering approximately 125,000 acres (195 sq mi) with its established inland boundary at any point is about 6 miles (10 km) inland from the shore east of Ohio Route 45 and 14 miles (23 km) from the shore west of Ohio Route 45. It stretches over the land within two miles (3 km), in any direction, of the Grand River from its origin near West Farmington to the point where it flows into Lake Erie encompassing 14 miles (23 km) inland from any point on its shoreline.

== History ==
The name "Grand River" was assigned by early explorers and settlers to the river called "Sheauga" or "Geauga" by the indigenous natives. This Indian word actually means "raccoon" but was so widely misinterpreted that the name "Grand River" has applied to the river since the early nineteenth century. Ohio has a rich heritage as a wine producing region. Its viticultural history dates back to the 1800s, and at the turn of the 20th century there was a thriving wine industry along the shores of the lake making the state the nation's number one wine producer. Prohibition led to the decimation of the Grand River Valley's vineyards in the 1920s, but the development of cold-hardy hybrids sparked a resurgence of winemaking for the area in the latter half of the century. Ohio contains the second largest wine appellation of origin in the United States.

== Terroir ==
=== Geography and Climate ===
The Grand River Valley was formed when glaciers carved out the Great Lakes and deposited a ridge of fertile soil ideal for the cultivation of vineyards. Lake Erie has a moderating effect on climates of the Ohio south shore, extending the growing season in Ohio's "fruit belt." Along the Grand River in northeast Ohio, the climate, soils and geography enable this region to produce quality domestic wines. Like the Mosel, Bordeaux and the Sonoma/Russian River Valley, the rolling landscape of the Grand River Valley benefits from a climate moderated by the thermal effects of a large water mass, in this case, Lake Erie to the north. It is an added bonus that Erie is the shallowest of the Great Lakes, meaning that it is also the warmest. The lake freezes in the winter and the late spring thaw prevents nonseasonal warm spells in late winter and early spring. The lake's protection against spring frost damage and the delay of the first autumn frost defines the growing season. For commercial viticulture in this region, a growing season of 165 days is considered minimal and 180 days is preferable, and that the winter minimum temperature should infrequently fall below 10 °F (−12 °C) and almost never below 15 °F (−9 °C) depending on the distance inland from the lake shore. The petition proposal noted, "Temperature is the first consideration in selecting the location of a vineyard. It involves length of growing season, as well as magnitude and frequency of winter minimums. Temperature requirements must be satisfied for a site to be considered." The growing season micro-climate is characterized as warm, sunny days and cool nights. The USDA plant hardiness zones range from 6a to 7a.

=== Air Drainage ===
Air drainage is a geographical feature affecting viticulture which is found in any river valley. It is manifested by the tendency of cool air to sink along the surrounding topography and drain to the surface of the water. This phenomenon draws warmer air closer to the ground and reduces the incidence of frost damage. Air drainage distinguishes the Grand River Valley viticultural area from the Lake Erie viticultural area which surrounds it on all sides except at the inland boundary of the lake's climate influence. The boundary of the Grand River Valley viticultural area is established as any point which is two miles (3 km), in any direction, from the river, the approximate point where the air drainage feature is dissipated.

=== Soils ===
Over the millennia, strong, slow glaciations sculpted the landscape, exposing some rock types and covering up others. The bedrock is composed of older sedimentary mixed with igneous and metamorphic rocks in the subsurface. The common Ohio soil composition is an irregular veneer of Quaternary-age sediments of gravel, sand, clay and slit pushed up by glaciers during the formation of Lake Erie mixed with a windblown loess. The region offers winemakers a generous hoard of viticultural sites with a southeast aspect, where the vines can soak up the morning sun, and good air drainage further reduces the risk of frost. Rainfall is higher in the Grand River Valley than in other areas of Ohio, but the region's sand and gravel-based topsoil are free draining and efficiently disperse excess water. Much of the land slopes northeast towards the lake, letting the grapes catch early morning sun, but avoid afternoon heating. The hillsides promote water drainage from the vine's roots preventing oversaturation which dilutes the concentration of flavor, sugar and other quality attributes in the grapes.

== Wine Industry ==
The AVA proposal was the result of a petition submitted by Mr. Anthony P. Debevc, President of Chalet Debonne Vineyards, Inc., a winery located in Madison, Ohio. A huge range of cool-climate grape varieties and wine styles are produced in the Grand River Valley, and it now boasts over 30 wineries within the AVA and surrounding region. Over 50% of Ohio's grapes are grown in the Grand River Valley, and the region has over 1,300 acres (526 ha) of vineyards. Vitis vinifera varieties such as Chardonnay, Pinot Gris, Riesling, Pinot Noir, Riesling, Cabernet Sauvignon, Gamay Noir, Cabernet Franc and Merlot are joined in the vineyards by Franco-American hybrids such as Vidal Blanc and Traminette. Debonne Vineyards is the largest estate winery in Ohio, cultivating 175 acres (71 ha) of grapes and producing 85,000 US gallons (320,000 L) of wine annually. The recognition of Ohio's wine producing areas benefits the state's tourism as the Ohio Department of Natural Resources does its part to foster this important resource.
