= Lake Erie AVA =

American Viticultural Area in Ohio

Coordinates: 42°29′01″N 79°14′48″W

Lake Erie
- Wine region
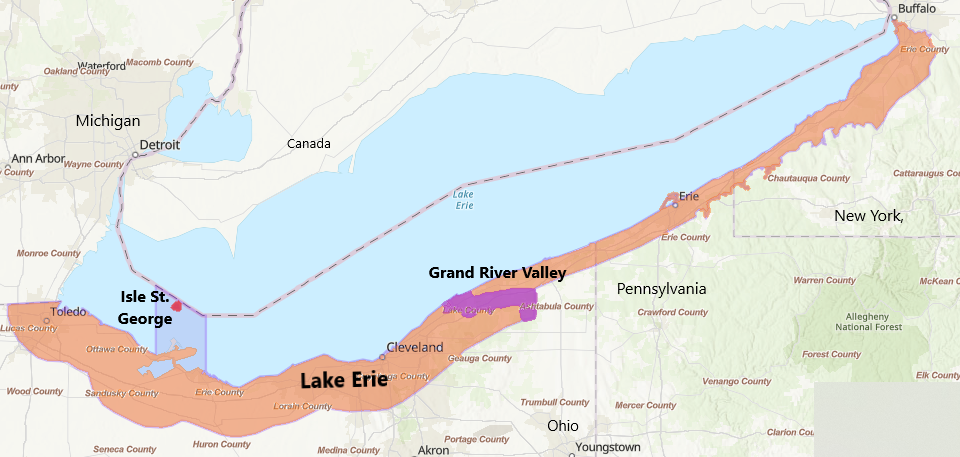
- Type: American Viticultural Area
- Year established: 1983
- Years of wine industry: 193
- Country: United States
- Part of: New York, Ohio, Pennsylvania
- Sub-regions: Grand River Valley AVA, Isle St. George AVA
- Growing season: 175–200 days
- Climate region: Region I-II
- Heat units: 2450 GDD units
- Precipitation (annual average): 41.47 in (1,053 mm)
- Soil conditions: Sedimentary, gravel, clay, slit, loess mix.
- Total area: 2.24 million acres (3,495 sq mi)
- Size of planted vineyards: 42,000 acres (17,000 ha)
- Grapes produced: Aurore, Auxerrois, Baco noir, Cabernet Franc, Cabernet Sauvignon, Catawba, Cayuga, Chambourcin, Chancellor, Chardonnay, Concord, De Chaunac, Delaware, Diamond, Edelweiss, Fredonia, Gewurztraminer, Ives noir, Lemberger, Leon Millot, Marechal Foch, Merlot, Niagara, Pinot gris, Pinot noir, Riesling, Seyval blanc, Steuben, Touriga Nacional, Traminette, Vidal blanc, Vignoles
- No. of wineries: 58

Lake Erie is a multi-state American Viticultural Area (AVA) that encompasses 2.24 million acres (3,495 sq mi) of the entire southern shoreline of Lake Erie spanning across New York, Pennsylvania and Ohio. It was established as the nation's 52^{nd}, Pennsylvania's second, New York's third and Ohio's fifth appellation on October 21, 1983 by the Bureau of Alcohol, Tobacco and Firearms (ATF), Treasury after reviewing the petition submitted by Mr; William A. Gulvin, Secretary of the Ad Hoc Committee for the Lake Erie Viticultural Area, proposing the multi-state viticultural area to be named "Lake Erie." Lake Erie was established on the same date as its sub-appellation, Grand River Valley AVA, the Buckeye State's fourth viticultural area. In New York and Pennsylvania, the "Chautauqua-Erie Grape Belt," is a sixty-mile-long (97 km) stretch of Lake Erie shoreline with a width that extends inland three to sixteen miles (4.8 to 25.7 km), with approximately 31,500 acres (12,700 ha) of vineyards on 582 farms, making it the second-largest grape-growing region outside of California.
Lake Erie AVA is a distinct and contiguous viticultural district where there are vineyards of one acre or more located in every county, except Sandusky County, along the lake shore from near Toledo, Ohio to south of Buffalo, New York with very little or no commercial viticulture is indicated in surrounding inland counties. Over 42,000 acres (17,000 ha) of the region are cultivated with grapevines, predominantly in the Concord grape variety. The region has a humid continental climate measuring Dfa/Dfb, and the hardiness zone ranges from 6a in higher areas to 7a in some lakefront areas.

== History ==
The name of the area, Lake Erie, was well documented in the petition. Lake Erie is the geographical feature that defines this viticultural area. Its name dates from the earliest written history of this continent, and Lake Erie is universally known as such. After evaluating the petition and the comments received, ATF believed that the Lake Erie viticultural area has a unique historical identity and that the name "Lake Erie" is the most appropriate name for the area.

The Lake Erie viticultural area has an over 190-year history of grape growing and wine-making where trial and error over the years has proven viticulture in lands bordering the area to be generally uneconomical. Lake Erie is bordered on its eastern and southern shores by many vineyards that actually lie in Pennsylvania, Ohio and western New York. The Pennsylvania wineries are mostly around the city of North East. The Ohio wineries stretch from the eastern border of Ohio and Pennsylvania all the way west to Sandusky. In New York the Chautauqua area extends westward from Buffalo to Pennsylvania. Grapes are often sold among these states, and winemakers enjoy a cooperative spirit.

The approximate boundaries of the Lake Erie viticultural area have long been recognized. The Chautauqua portion of the Lake Erie viticultural area is described thusly:

The Chautauqua grape belt lies along the southeastern shore of Lake Erie. It averages about three miles in width and is about fifty miles long. Its northeastern boundary is in Erie County but not far from the line dividing Erie and Chautauqua Counties; its western boundary, in New York, is the Pennsylvania line, and arbitrary division, for the district passes into Pennsylvania.

Grapes were first cultivated here in 1863 and many wineries survived Prohibition in the early twentieth century by legally selling grapes to home winemakers, marketing their products solely for religious purposes, i.e., sacremental and kosher wines (which continues to the present day), converting to grape juice production for companies such as Welch's, or illegally selling wine to consumers in Canada. A Volstead Act loophole allowed wines to be made as long as they were not sold. However, the wine industry in the Lake Erie region did not thrive after the Repeal of Prohibition and by 1967 there were fewer than twenty commercial wineries in the area. Recently, Lake Erie wineries have begun planting and vinifying Vitis vinifera varieties in an attempt to improve wine quality.

== Terroir ==
=== Geography ===
Lake Erie viticultural area is distinguished from surrounding areas by its proximity to Lake Erie which exerts a moderating influence on the area. This proximity to Lake Erie and the influence that Lake Erie exerts on the local climate is the fundamental factor that permits viticulture in this area. Soils, elevations, and other physiographic features within the area are diverse and, through most of the area, reflect the extent of the area that contains sites which can justifiably be said to be suitable for viticulture within the beneficial climatic influence of Lake Erie.

=== Climate ===
Authorities agree that temperature, in terms of length of frost-free growing season, freeze hazard at a given site, and especially winter minimums, is the determining consideration with regard to the viability of a vineyard in the northeast. T. D. Jordan et al. in their bulletin on Cultural Practices for Commercial Vineyards (1981), state that: "Temperature is the first consideration in selecting the location of a vineyard. It involves length of growing season, as well as magnitude and frequency of winter minimums. Temperature require consideration in selecting the location of a vineyard. It involves length of growing season, as well as magnitude and frequency of winter minimums. Temperature requirements must be satisfied for a site to be considered." They go on to note that for commercial viticulture in this region a growing season of 165 days is considered minimal and 180 plus days is preferable, and that winter minimum temperature should infrequently fall below −10 °F (−23 °C) and almost never below −15 °F (−26 °C). Stephen S. Visher, in his book Climatic Atlas of the United States (1954), summarizes the general climatic effect of the Great Lakes on their surroundings.

Although the effect of a lake is chiefly to the leeward, in the Great Lakes region winds are so varied in direction that effects are evident on all sides. On the average, the (Great) Lakes raise the January average temperature of their surroundings about 5 °F (−15 °C), the absolute minimum temperatures about 10 °F (−12 °C), and the annual minimum about 15 °F (−9 °C). They increase the average length of the frost-free season about 30 to 40 days on their eastern and southern sides. They have a slight negative total influence upon precipitation, decreasing it appreciably in summer, largely by reducing convectional thunderstorms,...The Lakes produce an average decrease of about five thunderstorms per year, and decrease the violence of many of those which do occur...The south shore of Lake Erie, with only five dense-fog days a year, has less fog than any other coastal area except southern Florida.

Lake Erie's effect on the summer moisture regime are very significant. The area surrounding Lake Erie usually gets significantly greater isolation in the summer months than areas further away from the Lake. The reduced summer rainfall and few fog days, which typically occur only in late winter and early spring, combined with almost continuous lake breezes, distinguish the Lake Erie area from surrounding areas. Also, the Lake Erie area is sheltered to some degree from the potential devastation of hail due to the inhibiting influence that Lake Erie has on thunderstorm vigor and activity. Most important are the temperature effects of Lake Erie. The Lake Erie area enjoys what has been termed a "lacustrine climate" lacking the temperature extremes otherwise inherent in a continental location according to Richard E. Dahlberg in an article in Economic Geography (1961), entitled "The Concord Grape Industry of the Chautauqua-Erie Area." The region benefits generally by being lower in latitude than and downwind from the other Great Lakes. The great stretches of Lakes Superior and Huron to the northwest considerably moderate arctic air masses moving across these lakes to the Lake Erie area. This effect is then locally enhanced by Lake Erie, thereby producing a climate adjacent to the Lake that has a lower mean daily range of temperatures. This results both in less growth-stimulating high temperatures and tissue-freezing low temperatures. These temperature effects are then diluted and gradually diminish as one proceeds inland from the Lake. Lake Erie has by far the largest surface to volume ratio of any of the Great Lakes; with an average depth of only 58 feet (18 m) and one-thirtieth of the volume of Lake Superior against a surface area of nearly 10,000 square miles (26,000 km^{2}). As a result, Lake Erie experiences by far the greatest annual temperature variation of any of the Great Lakes. It ranges from an average surface temperature of 72 °F (22 °C) in the late summer to 90 percent or more ice cover in the late winter-far more ice than typically develops on any other of the Great Lakes. This wide and rapid seasonal fluctuation of the lake water temperature, and this fluctuation's lag with respect to seasonal air temperature variation, serves a very beneficial climatologist effect throughout the year. In the early spring, the accumulated ice and the very cold water of the Lake serve to cool the climate of the adjacent land against early spring warm spells. In mid to late April, the Lake commences to warm rapidly and then buffers the area against late spring frost. In the summer, the water temperature is warmer than in any other of the Great Lakes. The summer's high temperature is then carried over into fall, warming the air adjacent to the Lake and keeping fall frosts at bay within the Lake Erie viticultural area for a month or more longer than surrounding areas. This results in an average frost-free period of approximately 170 to 175 days with a 200 day frost-free period to be found in some portions of the Lake Erie area, the longest frost-free period in the Great Lakes region. Likewise, proximity to the Lake in winter affords considerable protection against extreme minimum temperatures, with winter minimum temperatures of less than minus ten degrees Fahrenheit being uncommon across most of the Lake Erie viticultural area while inland areas often experience temperatures 10 to 15 °F (−12 to −9 °C) lower. In many portions of the Lake Erie viticultural area, the air drainage of a given site greatly affects its microclimate with respect to freeze and low temperature damage. In this regard, the sloping areas found further inland within the Lake Erie viticultural area have rather an advantage over the more level areas often found closer to the Lake, and Lake Erie, by being at the lowest elevation, serves as a vast sink for cold air to drain into. The only portion of the Lake Erie viticultural area in which elevation and physical features play an important role in distinguishing this area from surrounding areas is in Chautauqua County, New York, and Erie County, Pennsylvania. In these areas, the high-elevation Allegheny Plateau with its too short frost-free period and too long winter temperatures clearly limits the "lake effect" to a width as little as three miles (4.8 km) inland.
