= Cassady (grape) =

Variety of grape

- Grape (Vitis)
- Color of berry skin: Blanc
- Species: Interspecific crossing with Vitis labrusca in its pedigree
- Origin: Pennsylvania, United States

Cassady is a grape variety which is greenish-white in color. It is related to the "Fox Grape", Vitis labrusca, and it is an offspring of an open pollination variant of V. labrusca, which means that it is classified as an interspecific crossing, a hybrid grape. It was first described in the Interim Fruit Report of the Pennsylvania Horticultural Society in November, 1853. The first Cassady grapevine sprang up as a volunteer (unplanted) seedling in the yard of P.H. Cassady at 29 Logan Square, Philadelphia, Pennsylvania, in 1847. It did not bear fruit for five years, but when it finally did, the grapes it produced were found by Cassady to be juicy, pleasantly flavoured, and of very good quality. The Cassady grape was propagated and subsequently crossed with the better-known Concord grape to produce a new white grape variety, the Niagara grape, which is the cultivar most commonly used for the production of white grape juice in North America.

The original description of the Cassady grape was published in November 1853 on page 563 of The Magazine of Horticulture, Botany, and All Useful Discoveries and Improvements in Rural Affairs, Vol. XIX, 1853:

ART. III. Societies.
PENNSYLVANIA HORTICULTURAL.
Ad Interim Fruit Report, for November, 1853. — Since the October meeting of the Society, the following fruits have been forwarded to the Fruit Committee for examination : —
From P. H. Casaady, 29 Logan Square, two varieties of grapes.
1. The Cassady. — An accidental seedling white grape, with native leaf, and dark purplish wood, that sprung up in Mr. Cassady's yard in 1847, and fruited in 1852 for the first time. Bunch, of medium size, tolerably compact, and sometimes shouldered. Berry, below medium, five-eighths of an inch in diameter; form round; color, greenish white with occasionally a faint salmon tint, and thickly covered with white bloom; flesh, juicy with but little pulp; flavor, pleasant; quality "very good."

== Synonyms ==
Cassady is also known under the synonyms Arcott, Arnott, and Arrott.
