= John Adlum =

American viticulturalist

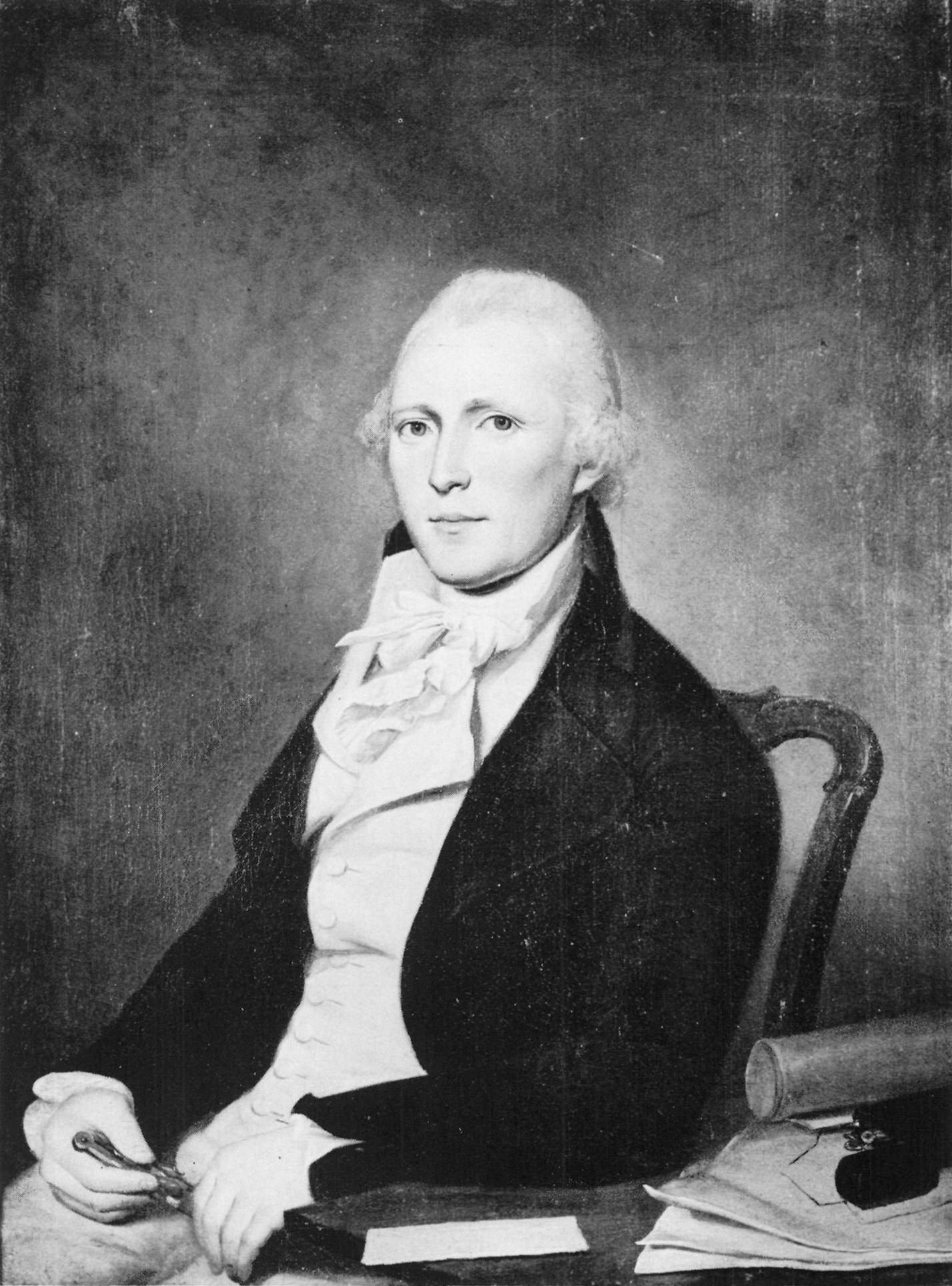
- John Adlum by Charles Willson Peale
- Born: April 29, 1759; York, Province of Pennsylvania, British America
- Died: March 14, 1836 (aged 76); Washington, D.C., U.S.
- Resting place: Oak Hill Cemetery; Washington, D.C., U.S.
- Occupations: Viticulturalist, winemaker
- Years active: 1814–1830
- Known for: Father of American viticulture, discoverer and promoter of the Catawba wine grape
- Spouse: Margaret K. Adlum (née Adlum) (m. 1805)
- Children: Margaret Catherine Adlum and Anna Maria Adlum
- Parent(s): Joseph and Catherine (née Abbott) Adlum
- Military career
- Allegiance: United States
- Branch: Continental Army; Pennsylvania militia Provisional Army; United States Army
- Service years: 1776–1777, 1795, 1799–1800, 1807–18??
- Rank: Captain
- Units: Flying Camp; 11th Regiment of Infantry
- Conflicts: American Revolutionary War; Battle of Fort Washington; War of 1812; Raid on Havre de Grace

Signature
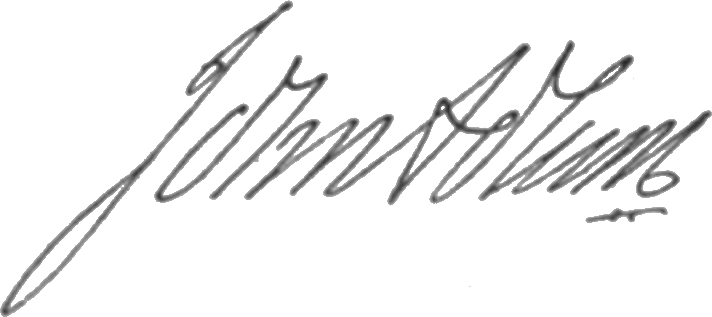

John Adlum (April 29, 1759 – March 14, 1836) was a pioneering American viticulturalist who was the first to cultivate the Catawba grape. He is known as "the father of American viticulture" (grape-growing). He also served in the American Revolutionary War; was a well-known surveyor; was one of the first associate judges in Lycoming County, Pennsylvania; and served in the United States Army in the War of 1812.

== Early life and military career ==
Adlum was born on April 29, 1759, in York, Pennsylvania, to Joseph and Catherine (Abbott) Adlum. His father was the sheriff and coroner for York County, and Adlum was raised in York. His paternal family was of Scots-Irish descent, while maternally he was of English descent. He was 15 years old when the American Revolutionary War broke out, but nonetheless organized a company of fellow teenagers from York County to help prosecute the war. Most of these fought with the Pennsylvania Blues, a volunteer state militia group. But Adlum led the rest to Philadelphia and volunteered to join the nascent American national army led by George Washington. He volunteered for duty on July 7, 1776, and was assigned to the Flying Camp. Commissioned a corporal when his training was complete, he helped build Fort Lee in New Jersey. He was captured by the British on November 6, 1776, at the Battle of Fort Washington, but was imprisoned along with many American officers in homes in New York City where he had relatively good freedom of movement. He was released on parole in February 1777.

Unable to participate in the war any further due to the terms of his parole, Adlum settled in Northumberland County, Pennsylvania, where his father now lived and had a tanning business. John disliked the work, however, and began studying mathematics. He apprenticed as a surveyor, and in 1784 established a surveying practice. He won a commission in 1789 to survey the area around Presque Isle (now Erie, Pennsylvania), and to survey the navigability of the Susquehanna River. He later won a joint contract to survey the navigability of the Schuylkill River. Adlum was so well-regarded, and westward expansion was proceeding so swiftly, that he made a small fortune as a surveyor.

Adlum was appointed one of the first associate judges of Lycoming County, Pennsylvania, in 1795. He was commissioned a brigadier general in the Pennsylvania militia the same year. However, Adlum resigned his judgeship in 1798 and moved to Havre de Grace, Maryland.

Adlum took up farming at Havre de Grace. Although the exact nature of his farming efforts are not clear, it is known that he began a vineyard to begin experimenting with growing native American grapes and using them in winemaking. Adlum's interest in grapes began while he was a surveyor, during which time he took extensive notes on the various types of American grapes he encountered, their growing conditions, flavors, and more. He initially tried growing vines imported from Europe, but these succumbed to disease and insects. He turned his attention to domestic vines, and in 1809 succeeded in making an excellent wine from the Alexander grape. He sent some bottles to President Thomas Jefferson, who had an extensive knowledge of French wine. Jefferson praised Adlum's Alexander wine, comparing it very favorably to an excellent French Chambertin. Adlum wanted to keep planting European vines (knowing Americans would discriminate against a domestic wine, no matter how good). But Jefferson advised him to stick to domestic varieties, as European vines would take "centuries" to adapt to the American climate and pests.

Adlum's military experience did not go unnoticed in Maryland. On January 8, 1799, the federal government commissioned him a major in the 11th Regiment of Infantry of the new Provisional Army. The Provisional Army disbanded in 1800, and Adlum was honorably discharged. Adlum married his cousin, Margaret K. Adlum on December 13, 1805, in Frederick, Maryland. The couple had two children, Margaret Catherine and Anna Maria. Adlum then enlisted in the newly formed United States Army in 1807, receiving a commission as a lieutenant. He was promoted to captain in 1808. He served in U.S. Army in the War of 1812, and fought the British in the Raid on Havre de Grace on May 3, 1813.

== Horticultural career ==
Adlum moved his family to the District of Columbia in 1814. Two years later, on December 4, 1816, he purchased 45 acres (180,000 m^{2}) from John Heath in what is now the Cleveland Park neighborhood north of the town of Georgetown. This land was, at the time, known as the "Addition to the Rock of Dumbarton". (The "Rock of Dumbarton" was a 50-acre (200,000 m^{2}) parcel adjacent to Rock Creek and Georgetown owned by George Corbin Washington, nephew to President George Washington.) He added another 1 acre (4,000 m^{2}), purchased from Joseph Nourse, on June 11, 1819. His final land acquisitions came on February 4, 1820. They consisted of 93.75 acres (379,400 m^{2}) from James Dunlop (who had also purchased part of the "Addition to the Rock of Dumbarton") and 80 acres (320,000 m^{2}) from John Heugh. This latter property, called "Gizor", Adlum renamed "The Vineyard," and he built a home there for his family.

Adlum began growing grapes on his farm, and in 1819 began cultivating the Catawba grape. Adlum took cuttings from a vine owned by a Mrs. Scholl, who lived in Clarksburg, Maryland, in 1819. Mrs. Scholl advised that a Roman Catholic priest from Germany told her the vine was a "Tokay" (Tokaji) from Hungary. Mrs. Scholl, however, referred to the grape as a Catawba. Adlum's first vintage from his estate was produced in 1821 or 1822 (the history of winemaking at "The Vineyard" is unclear), and in 1822 had about 10 acres (40,000 m^{2}) under grape cultivation. Adlum sent Jefferson a bottle of what he called "Tokay" in 1822, but Jefferson was not very impressed. Nevertheless, Adlum expanded his vineyard, and by 1823 had 22 varieties of grape under cultivation. That year, he published A Memoir on the Cultivation of the Vine in America and the Best Mode of Making Wine, the first book ever published on American viticulture. During the presidential administration of John Quincy Adams, Adlum requested that the federal government lease a portion of "The Vineyard" and establish an agricultural experiment station. The proposal was not acted on, however.

In 1825, Adlum determined that the "Tokay" was not a Tokaji, and he began referring to the grape by the term Mrs. Scholl had used. (Botanist Liberty Hyde Bailey says that Adlum changed the name in 1828, but that does not fit with the rest of the known history of Adlum's winemaking.) Later investigations showed that the Catawba was a hybrid grape which grew naturally in thin soil along the Catawba River near Asheville, North Carolina. How the vine got to Maryland, or whether Adlum knew that it came from the Catawba River region when he began using Scholl's nomenclature, is not clear.

Botanist Liberty Hyde Bailey called Catawba grape "the first great American grape", and Adlum is known as the "father of American viticulture". The Catawba first became widely known after Nicholas Longworth of Cincinnati, Ohio, obtained cuttings of the Catawba from Adlum in 1825 and planted the vine on a large scale. Longworth made a vast fortune from the effort. The second great expansion of the Catawba grape came in 1845, when Ulster County, New York, winemaker William T. Cornell obtained cuttings from Adlum to found a major vineyard in the Hudson Valley. Cornell's efforts proved so successful that Catawba cultivation spread over much of the East Coast.

Adlum's own winemaking efforts were not successful, however. He added significant amounts of sugar to his must, he often mixed poor-quality wild grapes with his Catawba in order to create more juice, and he preferred to allow temperatures to rise as high as 115 °F (46 °C) during fermentation. Nonetheless, he became a national expert on winemaking, wrote extensively in agricultural journals, and lobbied agricultural societies and the federal government to acknowledge viticulture as a scientific discipline. But his lack of success at winemaking itself left Adlum without a good income, and in his later years his family came close to poverty.

Adlum attempted to have the federal government purchase his 1828 book, Adlum on Making Wine, and sell it as a national textbook on viticulture. He was unsuccessful in this petition. Longworth observed that by this time, Adlum was in "poverty". After 1830, Adlum no longer contributed to agricultural journals or the national debate on viticulture and winemaking. In 1831, Adlum was forced to claim a minuscule pension for his Revolutionary War service (which he had long refused to do) in order to provide for his family.

== Death ==
John Adlum died at "The Vineyard" on March 1, 1836. Although records are unclear, historian Bessie Wilmarth Gahn says it is widely believed that Adlum was buried at the Presbyterian Burying Ground in Georgetown. Margaret Adlum died in 1852. John Adlum's body was probably disinterred at this time, and both John and Margaret buried in nearby Oak Hill Cemetery. Gahn and winemaking historian Thomas Pinney claim that Adlum's grave was lost for many years. Adlum's children and grandchildren, however, were buried alongside him in 1852, 1853, 1873, 1892, 1902, 1905, and 1924. Four of Margaret Adlum Barber's grandchildren were disinterred and buried alongside their grandfather as well. These included Carline R. Barber (February 20, 1848 – July 26, 1848), Margaret Adlum Barber (May 20, 1846 – July 6, 1849), Mary Virginia Barber (October 17, 1843 – July 9, 1849), Susan Rowles Barber (April 22, 1842 – July 11, 1849), and Luke White Barber (June 3, 1849 – July 9, 1849).

The Adlum and Barber graves were in place by April 1854, with the Washington Evening Star noting their beauty.

=== Legacy ===
To commemorate Adlum's horticultural work, the botanist Constantine Samuel Rafinesque named the climbing plant, Adlumia, in Adlum's honor in 1807.

Adlum's contributions to American viticulture were largely forgotten after his death. It was not until the end of the 1800s when botanist Liberty Hyde Bailey rediscovered his work, and popularized Adlum's contributions to vine-growing and winemaking.

Adlum's home at "The Vineyard" became derelict, and in 1903 the federal government purchased a portion of "The Vineyard". The house was torn down in 1911 to make way for the headquarters of the National Bureau of Standards (now the National Institute of Standards and Technology).

The Williamsburg Winery in Williamsburg, Virginia, sells a John Adlum Chardonnay named after Adlum.

== Published works by Adlum ==
- A Memoir on the Cultivation of the Vine in America and the Best Mode of Making Wine. 1823.
- A Memoir on the Cultivation of the Vine in America and the Best Mode of Making Wine. Enlarged ed. 1828.
- Adlum on Making Wine. 1826.

== Bibliography ==
- Anspach, William Reid (1961). Historical Sketches of the Bench and Bar of Lycoming County, Pennsylvania, 1795–1960. Williamsport, Pa.: Lycoming Law Association.
- Bailey, Liberty Hyde (1911). Cyclopedia of American Agriculture: A Popular Survey of Agricultural Conditions, Practices and Ideals in the United States and Canada. New York: Macmillan.
- Black, Merle R.; Judziewicz, Emmet J. (2009). Wildflowers of Wisconsin and the Great Lakes Region: A Comprehensive Field Guide. Madison, Wisc.: University of Wisconsin Press. ISBN 9780299230548.
- Butler, James L.; Butler, John J. (2001). Indiana Wine: A History. Bloomington, Ind.: Indiana University Press. ISBN 0253340365.
- Dann, John C. (1983). The Revolution Remembered: Eyewitness Accounts of the War for Independence. Chicago: University of Chicago Press. ISBN 0226136221.
- Gahn, Bessie Wilmarth (1938). "Major John Adlum of Rock Creek". Records of the Columbia Historical Society, Washington, D.C.: 127–139.
- Historic American Buildings Survey (1969). Oak Hill Cemetery, Gatehouse. HABS No. DC-249 (PDF) (Report). Washington, D.C.: U.S. Department of the Interior. Archived from the original (PDF) on 2014-05-22.
- McCullough, David (2005). 1776. New York: Simon and Schuster. ISBN 9780743287708.
- Peter, Grace Dunlop; Southwick, Joyce D. (1958). Cleveland Park, An Early Residential Neighborhood of the Nation's Capital. Washington, D.C.: Cleveland Park Community Library Committee.
- Pinney, Thomas (1989). A History of Wine in America: From the Beginnings to Prohibition. Berkeley, Calif.: University of California Press. p. 139. ISBN 0520062248. "John Adlum Havre de Grace."
- Tebbitt, Mark C.; Lidén, Magnus; Zetterlund, Henrik (2008). Bleeding Hearts, Corydalis, and Their Relatives. Portland, Ore.: Timber Press. ISBN 9780881928822.
- Williams, Paul Kelsey; Higgins, Kelton C. (2003). Cleveland Park. Charleston, S.C.: Arcadia Publishing. ISBN 0738515213.
