= Schuyler (grape) =

Variety of grape

Schuyler is a blue-skinned hybrid wine and table grape created in 1947 by crossing the red Vitis vinifera Zinfandel with the Vitis labrusca hybrid Ontario. It is the parent, with the hybrid Seyval, of Cayuga White and its sister Horizon. It was created, along with many hybrid grapes designed for the climate of New York's Finger Lakes, at the New York State Agricultural Experiment Station located at Cornell University in Geneva, New York. It is very cold tolerant, down to -29 °C / -20 °F. Bred by Wellington and Oberle, it is also known as "New York 13920".
