= Catawba (grape) =

Variety of grape

- Grape (Vitis)
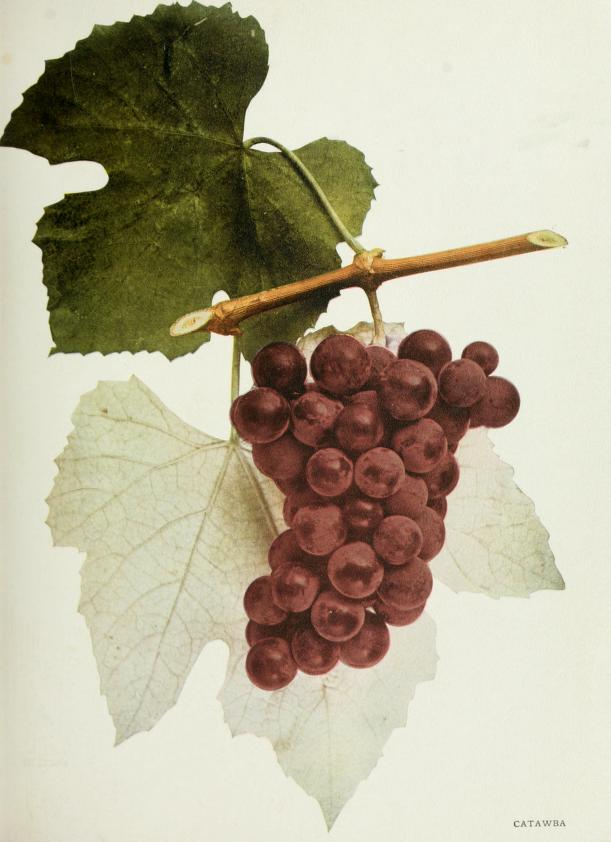
- Photographic plate of Catawba grape from the book The Grapes of New York, 1908 by Ulysses Prentiss Hedrick
- Color of berry skin: Rouge
- Species: Vitis labrusca × Vitis vinifera "Sémillon"
- Also called: See list of synonyms
- Origin: United States
- VIVC number: 2346

Catawba is a red American grape variety used for wine as well as juice, jams and jellies. Grown predominantly on the East Coast of the United States, this purplish-red grape is a likely a hybrid of the native American Vitis labrusca and the Vitis vinifera cultivar Sémillon. Its exact origins are unclear but it seems to have originated somewhere on the East Coast between the Carolinas and Maryland.

Catawba played an important role in the early history of American wine. During the early to mid-19th century, it was the most widely planted grape variety in the country and was the grape behind Nicholas Longworth's acclaimed Ohio sparkling wines that were distributed as far away as California and Europe.

Catawba is a late-ripening variety, ripening often weeks after many other labrusca varieties and, like many vinifera varieties, it can be susceptible to fungal grape diseases such as powdery mildew.

== Origins ==
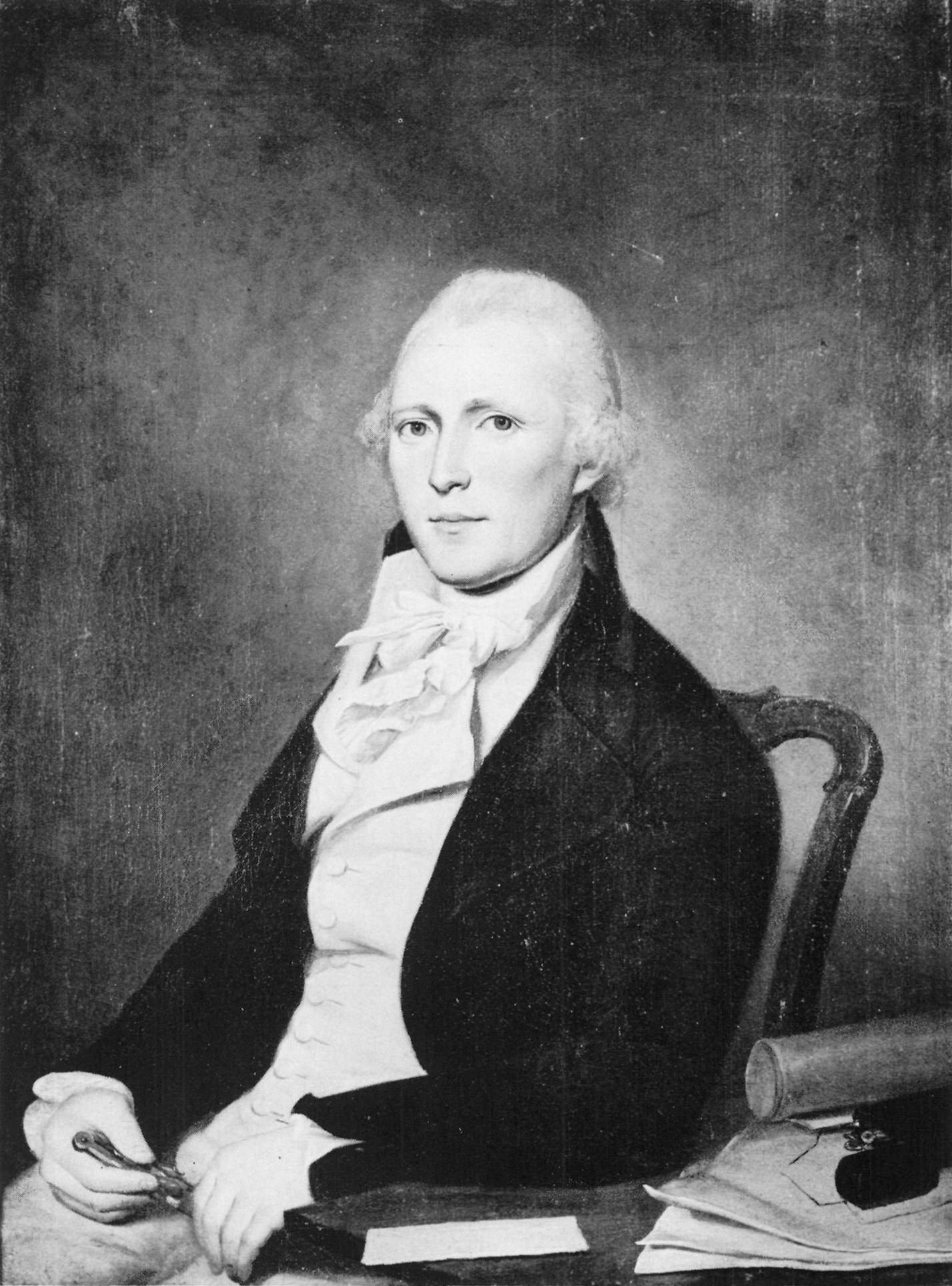
John Adlum

The exact origins and parentage of the Catawba grape are unclear. While most sources agree that Major John Adlum was growing the variety at his nursery in Georgetown, Washington, D.C, by at least 1823, where he got the cuttings of the vine is unknown; two widowed Maryland women are given attribution by different writers. Wine writer Bern Ramey and University of California, Davis viticulture professor Lloyd A. Lider credit Mrs. J. Johnston of Fredericktown, Maryland, who wrote to Adlum and said while her late husband always called the grapes "Catawba", she did not know where he got the original vines from. Historian Thomas Pinney describes a similar story with Adlum receiving the cuttings in 1819 from a Mrs. Scholl of Clarksburg, Maryland, whose late husband grew the grape. Again, the story goes that Mrs. Scholl told Adlum that while her husband always called the grape "Catawba", she could not recall where the vines came from. It is possible that the source of the Catawba grapes came from the Rose Hill property, in Rockville, Maryland, which was acquired early in the 19th century by Lewis and Eliza Wootton Beall, as part of Eliza's dowry from her father Richard Wootton. It is during their ownership of Rose Hill that grapes were first cultivated on their property. The remnants of these grapes was reported in 1882 to still be evident in the sole surviving grapevine that runs eastward from the side of the barn towards the Rose Hill Mansion. According to J. Thomas Scharf, the presence of Catawba grapevines at Rose Hill can be traced back to the early decades of the 19th century. Cuttings of the Catawba grape, first discovered in western North Carolina around 1801, are believed to have been transported to Montgomery County before 1816, when they were left by a traveler with Jacob Scholl, an innkeeper in Clarksburg. They appeared at Rose Hill shortly thereafter when Eliza Beall obtained some cuttings from her brother Singleton Wootton, who had, in turn, gotten them from Scholl.

The Catawba grape is one of the earliest Vitis labrusca grapes used in wine production, but can also be eaten or made into grape juice, jam, or jelly. The Vitis International Variety Catalogue gives credit to the Scholls and describes Catawba as a crossing of the North American species Vitis labrusca with the European species Vitis vinifera and list 1819 as its likely introduction. The Oxford Companion to Wine states the vine was identified in North Carolina even earlier, in 1802, but does not state who discovered the variety. British wine expert Oz Clarke also places the vine's origins in North Carolina but claims that it was first identified in 1801.

The possible Carolina origins do correspond with circumstantial details about the name "Catawba". In the Carolinas there is the Catawba River, which flows through the territory of the Catawba people. While the Catawba Indian Nation is currently centered in South Carolina, the Catawba people have historically populated the entire area that extended from the western Piedmont of North Carolina across the South Carolina border.

== History ==
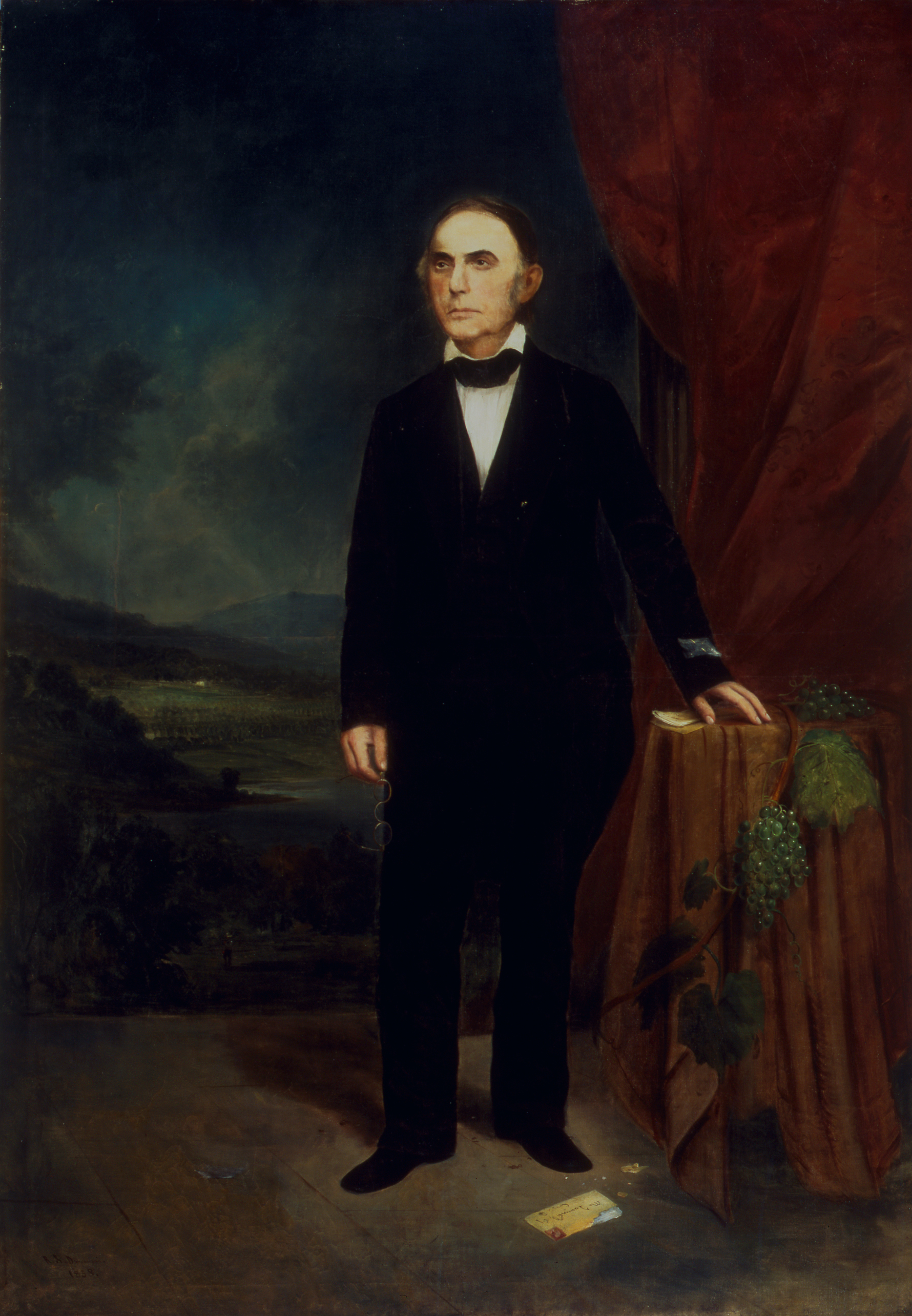
Nicholas Longworth as depicted by Robert S. Duncanson

From its obscure origins, the Catawba grape began appearing on nursery inventory lists across the United States and soon became a major grape in the growing American wine industry. From 1825 to 1850, it was the most widely planted grape in the United States. One early adopter was Nicholas Longworth of Cincinnati, Ohio who founded America's first commercially successful winery. After difficulties cultivating the Alexander, Longworth purchased Catawba cuttings from Major Adlum and planted a vineyard along the Ohio River. After accidentally stumbling upon sparkling wine production in his winery, Longworth began producing a sparkling Catawba modeled after the wines of Champagne.

From the 1830s through the 1850s, Longworth's still and sparkling Catawba were being distributed from California to Europe where it received numerous press accolades. In the 1850s, a journalist from The Illustrated London News noted that the still white Catawba compared favorably to the hock wines of the Rhine and the sparkling Catawba "transcends the Champagnes of France". The wines were also well received at home in the United States where Henry Wadsworth Longfellow published a poem dedicated to Nicholas Longworth titled Ode to Catawba Wine. The popularity of Longworth's wine encouraged a flurry of plantings along the Ohio River Valley and up north to Lake Erie and Finger Lakes region of New York. So influential was Longworth's Catawba wine that newspapers began referring to him as "the founder of wine culture in America, author of sparkling Catawba."

Longworth was a fervent champion of Catawba, particularly grown in the Ohio River Valley, as a grape that he believed would lead the American wine industry for years to come. Prior to his sparkling Catawba, no other American wine had received the level of critical acclaim in Europe that his wines received. In the American journal Culture of the Grape and Manufacture of Wine, Longworth wrote in 1847, "The day is not distant, when the Ohio River will rival the Rhine, in the quantity and quality of its wine. I give the Catawba preference over all other grapes, for a general crop, for wine."

The year 1859 was Catawba's peak in the Ohio wine industry, with the state being the largest producer in the United States, producing more than 568,000 US gallons (21,500 hL) of wine from 2,000 acres (800 ha) acres of mostly Catawba vines. But the 1860s brought an end to the enthusiasm when powdery mildew decimated Catawba plantings and the economic turmoil of the American Civil War led to many vineyards being pulled up or abandoned. Another labrusca variety, the Concord developed in 1849 in Concord, Massachusetts by Ephraim Wales Bull soon eclipsed Catawba in plantings and ended its dominance of the American wine industry.

== Description and viticulture ==
Like many Vitis labrusca varieties, the Catawba grapevine has large leaves that can be mono-lobed or moderately three-lobed with the slightly smaller leaves that are closer to the apical meristem of the vine shoot. The upper surface of the leaves have a medium green color with a leathery texture while the underside has dense white tomentum (wooly hairs). The vine produces moderate size clusters that are nearly cylindrical and fairly compact. The large berries have an oval shape with what Bern Ramey describes as'"a dull purplish-red with a lilac-colored bloom". The Catawba has the characteristic labrusca "slip-skin" which is thick but slides easily off between the fingers, leaving the pulp intact.

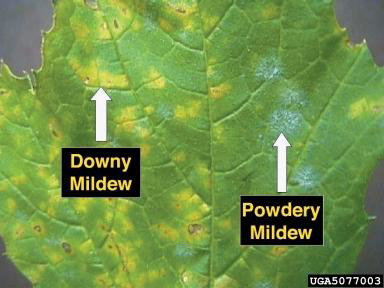
Like many vinifera varieties, Catawba is susceptible to both downy and powdery mildew.

The Catawba is a hardy vine that can handle the severe continental climate of the Eastern United States which includes hot, humid summers and cold winters. However, the vine is a late ripening variety, usually one to two weeks later than other labrusca varieties like Concord and Delaware which means that it is susceptible to harvest time hazards that can come in locations with short growing seasons before incremental winter weather sets in. The possible vinifera parentage also means that the Catawba has a higher susceptibility to various grape diseases, like powdery and downy mildew, than typical labrusca varieties.

=== Pink Catawba ===
In the 1940s, French-American viticulturalist Charles Fournier discovered a clonal mutation of Catawba in his Finger Lake vineyards that had less pigmentation in skin and could produce a lighter rosé wine than the usual Catawba variety. Fournier decided to use this variety, named Pink Catawba, in his New York sparkling wine from Gold Seal Vineyards. In 1950, this sparkling pink Catawba was the first non-California wine to win a gold medal at the wine tasting competition of the California State Fair.

== Wine regions ==
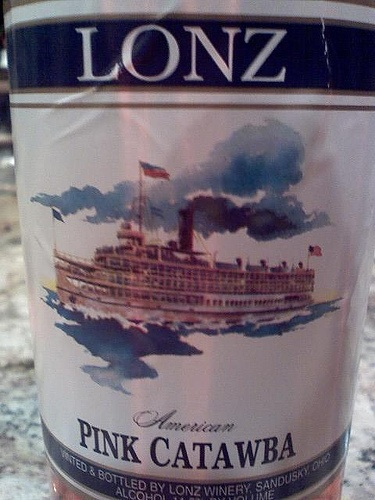
A bottle of Lonz Winery American Pink Catawba wine

The Catawba grape can still be found throughout the Midwest and Eastern United States, though its numbers are not very large due to the prevalence of more recent French-American hybrid varieties and increased plantings of Vitis vinifera in area suitable for its cultivation. The areas with the largest concentration of plantings are the Lake Erie and Finger Lakes wine region, but Catawba can also be found in Arkansas, Georgia, Michigan, Missouri, Ohio, Pennsylvania, North Carolina, South Carolina and Washington.

== Winemaking and wine styles ==
In favorable locations that can accommodate the grape's late ripening, Catawba can produce a medium bodied wine with moderate acidity and enough sugars to produce off-dry to dry styles of wine. Though the grape is technically considered a "red wine" grape, Catawba actually produces rosés of varying shades of pink and white wines because the concentration of anthocyanins in the grapes is very low and they contribute little color during maceration. Similarly, the low amount of phenols from the skins also means that Catawba wines are very low in tannins and extract. Winemakers wishing to produce a darker Catawba can use thermovinification, with heat breaking down some of the coloring compounds from the skin, but that can have an effect on the overall flavor profile of the wine.

The flavor of Catawba can have varying degrees of "foxiness", which refers to the fruity or "grapey" aromas commonly associated with Vitis labrusca varieties. While European tasters, such as Oz Clarke and Jancis Robinson, often describe the level of foxiness as "distinctive", American writers such as Ramey note that Catawba wines usually fall somewhere in the middle between Concord and vinifera when it comes to foxy aromas.

== Synonyms ==
Catawba is also known under the synonyms Arkansas, Captraube Rot, Catawba Rosa, Catawampus, Catowba Tokay, Cher Kee, Cherokee, Fancher, Francher Kello White, Francher Kells White, Keller's White, Lebanon, Lebanon Seedling, Lichigan, Lincoln, Lincolun, Mammoth Catawba, Meads Seedling, Mecleron, Merceron, Michigan, Muncy, Muncy Pale Red, Municipale Red, Omega, R'd Muncy, Red Muncy, Rose Of Tennessee, Rote Captraube, Sarato A, Saratoga, Singleton, Tekomah, Tokay, Virginia Amber, and White Catawba.

== Catawba (color) ==
Catawba

Color coordinates
- Hex triplet: #703642
- sRGB^{B} (r, g, b): (112, 54, 66)
- HSV (h, s, v): (348°, 52%, 44%)
- CIELCh_{uv} (L, C, h): (31, 37, 1°)
- Source: Maerz and Paul
- ISCC–NBS descriptor: Dark red
- B: Normalized to [0–255] (byte)

At right is displayed the color catawba.

The color catawba is a representation of the color of the outer skin of catawba grapes.

The first recorded use of catawba as a color name in English was in 1916.
