= Fox grape =

Fox grape is a common name which may refer to the following species of grapevine:

- Vitis labrusca
- Vitis vulpina (also called "frost grape")
