= Central Delaware Valley AVA =

American Viticultural Area in New Jersey

Coordinates: 40°24′41″N 75°01′30″W

Central Delaware Valley
- Wine region
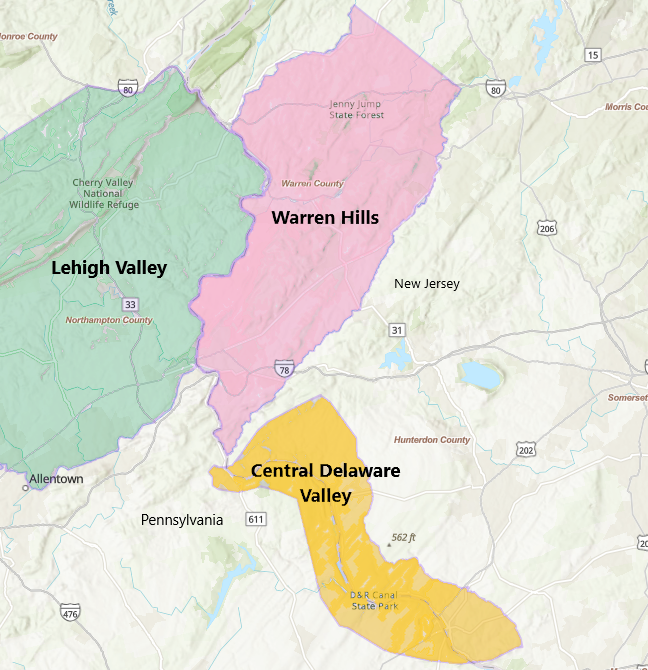
- Type: American Viticultural Area
- Year established: 1984
- Years of wine industry: 62
- Country: United States
- Part of: New Jersey, Pennsylvania
- Growing season: 170–180 days
- Climate region: Region IIIa
- Heat units: 3100–3200 GDD units
- Precipitation (annual average): 40 to 47 in (1,000–1,200 mm)
- Soil conditions: Shaley loam composed of weathered conglomerate, sandstone, and limestone
- Total area: 96,000 acres (150 sq mi)
- Size of planted vineyards: 55 acres (22 ha)
- No. of vineyards: 6
- Grapes produced: Barbera, Cabernet Sauvignon, Chambourcin, Chardonnay, Delaware, Pinot Noir, Riesling, Traminette and Vidal Blanc
- No. of wineries: 7

Central Delaware Valley is a multi-state American Viticultural Area (AVA) located along a segment of the Delaware River roughly between Trenton, New Jersey, and Easton, Pennsylvania. It was established as the nation's 61^{st}, New Jersey's initial and Pennsylvania's third wine appellation on March 19, 1984 by the Bureau of Alcohol, Tobacco and Firearms (ATF), Treasury after reviewing a petition submitted by Mr. James R. Williams, a grape grower in Frenchtown, New Jersey, on behalf of his vineyard business and local vintners, proposing a viticultural area named "Central Delaware Valley".
The viticultural area is located along the Delaware River in Central New Jersey's Hunterdon and Mercer counties and Bucks County in southeastern Pennsylvania. The term "Central Delaware Valley" commonly describes the portion of the Delaware River Valley landform between Trenton and the Easton/Philipsburg vicinity. The description corresponds generally to the southern and northern boundaries proposed in the petition.

The appellation encompasses 96,000 acres (150 sq mi) surrounding the Delaware River north of Philadelphia. Its southern boundary is near Titusville, New Jersey, just north of Trenton, and its northern border is near Musconetcong Mountain. A variety of Vitis vinifera and Vitis labrusca grape varieties can be grown in the area.

== History ==
Although this region has only recently become associated with commercial viticulture, it had vineyards back in the Colonial Days. The Delaware grape was discovered in Frenchtown but named the "Delaware" because it was first brought to public notice by Abram Thomson of Delaware, Ohio. In fact, the Delaware grape variety was propagated from cuttings brought by a French immigrant Paul Mallet-Provost, who, in 1794, arrived in the New Jersey area, settled by other French-speaking people, that it gained the moniker of "Frenchtown". Since the Delaware has been determined to have been an early cross between native American Vitis labrusca and Vitis vinifera, it is likely that this cross developed from vines imported by Mallet-Provost, who was a fugitive of the French Revolution. Several of the vineyards in the region were 8 to 10 years old in 1984 when four wine-grape vineyards were in operation with several more planned.

== Terroir ==
=== Topography ===
The "Central" part of the Delaware Valley is separated from the upper and lower parts by mountains, the Musconetcong to the north and the Baldpate to the south. The moderating climatological effects of the Delaware River extend for no more than about three miles (5 km) from the river, or to the rim of the valley where ridges are pronounced. Soil types are homogenous within the "Central" part and differ from those to the north and south. Geologically, the "Central" part of the valley of the Delaware River falls in the Piedmont Province, while the lower part of the valley is in the Coastal Plain and the upper part lies in the Reading Prong of the New England province and the Great Valley portion of the Ridge and Valley Province. Climate also differs in that the farther north one travels the colder the winters and the shorter the growing season. The boundaries of the viticultural area may be found on seven U.S.G.S. topographical maps In the scale of 1:24,000 series: Riegelsville Quadrangle, Frenchtown Quadrangle, Lumberville Quadrangle, Stockton Quadrangle. Buckinham Quadrangle. Lambertville Quadrangle, and Pennington Quadrangle.

=== Climate ===
The moderating climatological effects of the Delaware River extend for no more than about three miles (5 km) from the river, or to the rim of the valley where ridges are pronounced. For example, morning fog covers were observed to reach approximately that distance. This region has a frost-free growing season of between 170 and 180 days. In terms of degree days (Davis system), the region ranges from 3100 in the North to 3200 in the South. Such a range corresponds to California Region III (low end) in which portions of Napa and Sonoma Valleys are included. Temperature readings in the valley during extremely cold winter lows tend to range from 5 to 10 °F (−15 to −12 °C) higher than the surrounding area. Fog from the river also affects growing conditions during the growing season, particularly in dry periods, by providing moisture. Data sources from the 1954 reference, "Climatic Atlas of the United States", prepared by the U.S. Department of Commerce, were presented concerning maximum, minimum, and average temperatures; number of days above 90 °F (32 °C) and below 32 °F (0 °C); last date of freezing weather in spring and first date of freezing weather in autumn; and mean length of frost-free period, indicate that the climate in the vicinity of the Central Delaware Valley viticultural area is warmer than in surrounding areas. Data compiled by the petitioner also showed yearly and monthly maximum and minimum temperatures, and length of growing season, at sites both within and without the viticultural area. Further evidence established that temperatures were higher and growing seasons longer within the viticultural area than in nearby areas at corresponding latitudes outside the area. It has a hot-summer humid continental climate (Dfa) and the USDA plant hardiness zone is mostly 7a and ranges from 6b to 7a.

=== Soils ===
Soil types are homogenous within the "Central" part and differ from those to the north and south. The Rockaway series soil type is a brown, gravelly loam found in the counties in northern New Jersey throughout Hunterdon, Mercer, Union, Essex and Bergen counties. It is formed from the exposed sediments deposited during the Devonian Period about 400 million years ago composed of weathered particles of conglomerate, sandstone, shale and limestone.

== Viticulture ==
The petitioner noted 33 acres (13 ha) of wine grapes were growing in the proposed region. Of these, thirteen acres (5.3 ha) were produced that year and twenty-one acres (8.5 ha) produced fruit the next year while seven acres (2.8 ha) have been productive for more than three years. One of the vineyards (Goat Hill) has been in existence for 18 years. Both Goat Hill and Seabrook sold all of their grapes to commercial wineries for the previous two years (they had previously sold to home winemakers). Table Rook Vineyard sold their grapes to Bucks Country Vineyards (Arthur Gerold's winery). DelVista Vinyards produced small crops (used for experimental winemaking) for the last two years and last year sold surplus juice to home wine makers. Also noted, an additional ten acres (4.0 ha) are being planted within the proposed area (four of these acres will be planted in a new vineyard, Deucalion, near Frenchtown). The vineyards currently in the area plan to plant an additional twenty to twenty-five acres (8.1–10.1 ha) within the next two years. At least three additional vineyards were planned within the next few years and many more people have indicated interest in starting vineyards in the area. DelVista Vineyards applied for federal and state winery licenses and expected to have its first commercial crush in 1982.
Wine has been produced from grapes grown in the region commercially since 1978. Tewksbury Wine Cellars, Lebanon, New Jersey, won a bronze medal for wine made from grapes from Goat Hill and Seabrook vineyards. Wine made from DelVista grapes has not been sold commercially, but was tasted by a number of wine experts and has received favorable comments.

In addition to being the birthplace of the Delaware grape variety, the Central Delaware Valley viticultural area has produced a sufficient number of commercial crops producing good wines made from grapes grown in the region. The number of acres currently producing may be small, but is still larger than other viticultural areas. In addition to the current and planned vineyards in the area, there are potential sites for hundreds of additional acres of wine grapes in the Central Delaware Valley.

== See also ==
- Alcohol laws of New Jersey
- Garden State Wine Growers Association
- Judgment of Princeton
- List of wineries, breweries, and distilleries in New Jersey
- New Jersey Farm Winery Act
- New Jersey Wine Industry Advisory Council
