= Ephraim Wales Bull =

American farmer and politician (1806–1895)

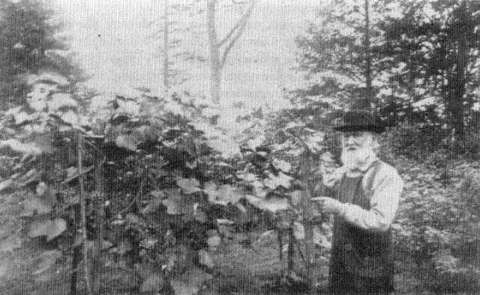
- Bull with his original vine of Concord grapes
- Born: March 4, 1806; Boston, Massachusetts, U.S.
- Died: September 26, 1895 (aged 89); Concord, Massachusetts, U.S.
- Resting place: Sleepy Hollow Cemetery, Concord, Massachusetts
- Occupation: Farmer

Ephraim Wales Bull (March 4, 1806 – September 26, 1895) was an American farmer and state legislator best known for the cultivation of the Concord grape.

== Biography ==
Ephraim Wales Bull was born on March 4, 1806, in Boston, Massachusetts. He was an apprentice for a goldbeater at a young age, and on September 10, 1826, he married Mary Ellen Walker of Dorchester. Complaining of lung problems, Bull moved to Concord in 1836, settling with his wife on a farm next door to Amos Bronson Alcott.

In 1843, Bull began the deliberate process of breeding a grape that could thrive in the cold New England climate. By 1849, having planted 22,000 seedlings, he had created a large, sweet variety from the native species fox grape, which he called 'Concord', and by 1853 the grapes were for sale. However, within several years, competing growers had begun raising their own crops of Concord grapes, purchased from Bull for $5 per vine, and Bull saw little profit from the strain after the initial sales.

Bull was elected to the Massachusetts House of Representatives in 1855. In 1893, after a fall, he went to live in the Concord Home for the Aged, and died on September 26, 1895, aged 89. He was buried in the Sleepy Hollow Cemetery in Concord, with an epitaph reading, "He Sowed Others Reaped" a biblical reference to John 4 verse 38."

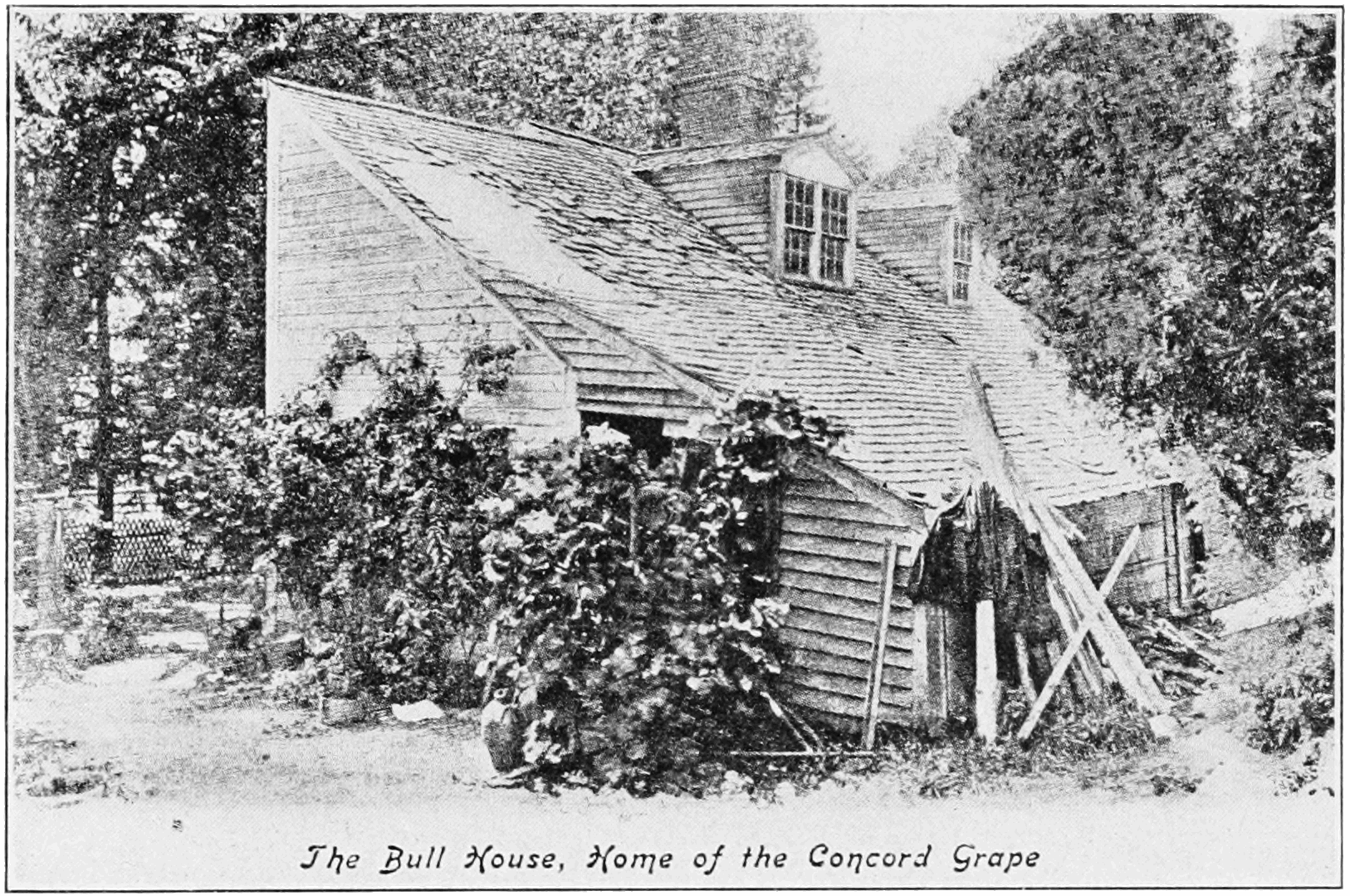
Bull's home in Concord, Massachusetts

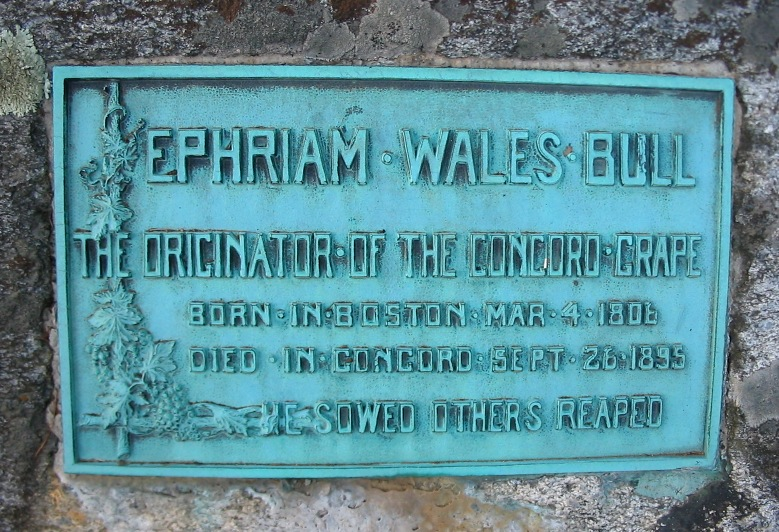
Epitaph of Ephraim Bull, Sleepy Hollow Cemetery, Concord
