= Diamond (grape) =

Variety of grape

The Diamond grape is a white grape which is a cross between the Concord and Iona grapes. It was developed in the 1880s in New York. It is used today in table wines and grape juice.

A cross with Black Muscat produced Golden Muscat. Several remarkable Japanese grape varieties with large berries were bred from a tetraploid mutation of this variety.
