= Cayuga White =

Variety of grape

Vitis 'Cayuga White'
- Genus: Vitis
- Hybrid parentage: Several, including V. labrusca, V. vinifera, and other North American species
- Cultivar group: Villard grapes, Seibel grapes
- Cultivar: 'Cayuga White'
- Origin: Geneva, New York

Cayuga White is a mid-season ripening wine grape developed from crosses of the Vitis labrusca hybrids Schuyler and Seyval Blanc at Cornell University's New York State Agricultural Experiment Station in Geneva, New York. It is a hardy vine with some bunch-rot disease resistance. In warmer climates it should be picked at lower sugars to avoid overripe, sometimes labrusca-like, flavors; however this has not been observed in cooler climates such as the Finger Lakes and Pacific Northwest, where desirable, Riesling-type flavors are tasted in fully ripe Cayuga fruit. Picked at the proper time, it can produce a very nice sparkling wine with good acid balance, structure, and pleasant aromas, or a fruity white wine similar to a Riesling or Viognier. One advantage of Cayuga is that, if harvested unripe (e.g., in a shorter summer in cool climates), it can still make a good wine, albeit one with more green apple flavors in that case.

This grape, when grown on mature vines in fertile soil, can produce astonishing yields. If allowed to set fully on thirty-year-old vines in Aurora, Oregon, Cayuga's yield has been measured at over 13 tons per acre, though in that case a "green harvest" (removing much of the fruit before the final phase of the ripening cycle) is advised, so that the vine can more fully ripen the remaining fruit.

Cayuga is relatively easy to make wine from. In cooler climates, it retains enough acid that a residual sugar level is advised, in order to achieve balance in the palate. Cayuga is grown in small regions in Ohio.

In one informal survey of grape breeders who grow hybrid grapes and make wine from them, Cayuga was the most-popular answer to the question "Which hybrid grape is the easiest to grow and make good wine from?"

It can also be seen in the vineyards in Rhode Island, such as Greenvale, a similar climate to the Finger Lakes for wine grape growing.
