= Delaware (grape) =

Variety of grape

- Grape (Vitis)
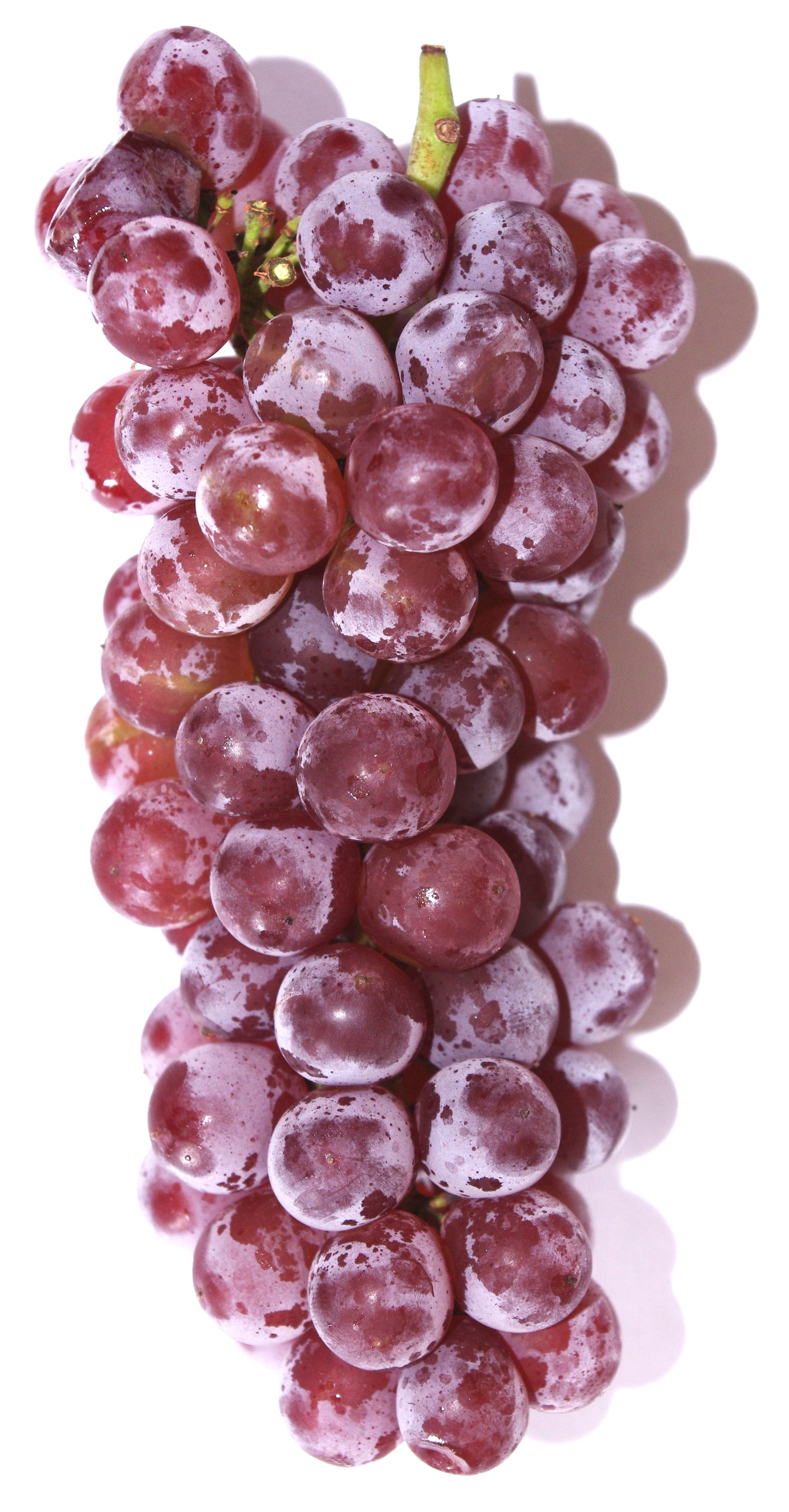
- Species: Vitis × labruscana
- Origin: United States
- Notable regions: North East and Mid West of United States, Japan
- Notable wines: Sparkling and Icewines
- VIVC number: 3498

The Delaware grape is a cultivar derived from the grape species Vitis labrusca or 'Fox grape' which is used for the table and wine production.

The skin of the Delaware grape when ripened has a pale red, almost pinkish colour, a tender skin, and juicy sweet flesh. It has small fruit clusters with small berries that do not have the pronounced 'foxiness' of other V. labrusca grapes. It is a slip-skin variety, meaning that the skin is easily separated from the fruit. The grapes are used to make wines including dry, sweet, icewine but is famed for spicy sparkling wines. The wine is light pink to white in colour.

It is a commercially viable grape vine which is grown in the Northeast and Midwest United States, and is vigorous when grafted onto a Phylloxera-resistant root stock. The Delaware grape is susceptible to downy mildew and ripens earlier than 'Concord'.

The Delaware grape is also a table grape variety sold in supermarkets throughout South Korea and Japan, where V. labrusca grape varieties are popular for their fragrance. Delaware Punch is named for the Delaware grape from which its flavor is primarily derived.

== History ==
The Delaware grape was probably discovered in Frenchtown, New Jersey, but was first brought to public notice by Abram Thomson, of Delaware, Ohio, in the 1850s. Although it is said to be an American variety, its parentage is unknown and is thought to have a significant Vitis vinifera component in its background, possibly explaining the susceptibility to fungal diseases and the requirement for grafting onto Phylloxera-resistant root stock for best growth. T.V. Munson believed it to be a hybrid of V. labrusca, V. vinifera, and "bourquiniana", a class of vines now believed to be hybrids of Vitis aestivalis.
