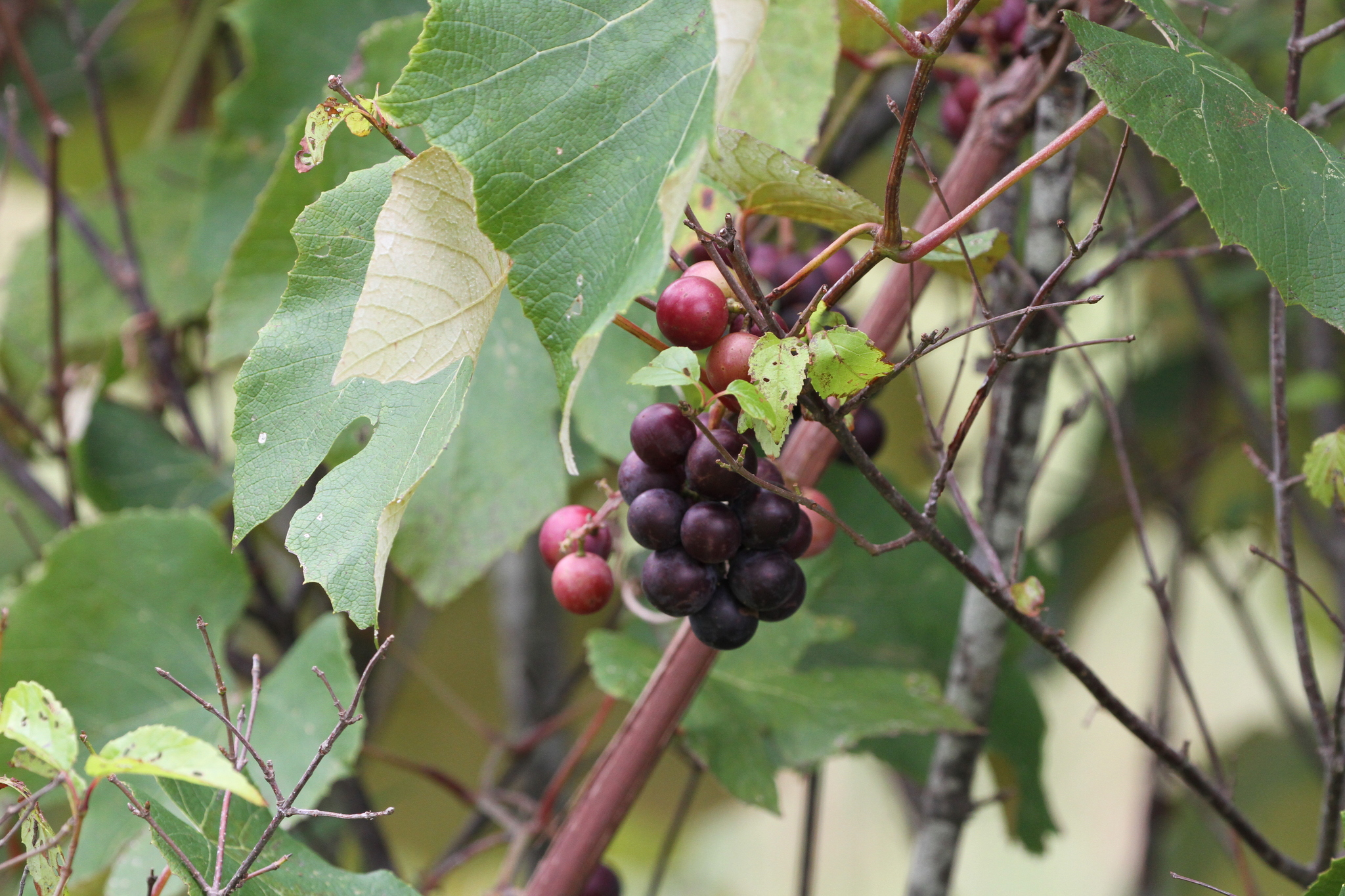

Conservation status
- Secure (NatureServe)

Scientific classification
- Kingdom: Plantae
- Clade: Tracheophytes
- Clade: Angiosperms
- Clade: Eudicots
- Clade: Rosids
- Order: Vitales
- Family: Vitaceae
- Genus: Vitis
- Species: V. labrusca

Binomial name
- Vitis labrusca L.

= Vitis labrusca =

Fox grape

Species of grapevine

Vitis labrusca, the fox grape, is a species of grapevines belonging to the Vitis genus in the flowering plant family Vitaceae. The vines are native to eastern North America and are the source of many grape cultivars, including Catawba, Concord, Delaware, Isabella, Niagara, and many hybrid grape varieties such as Agawam, Alexander and Onaka. Among the characteristics of this vine species in contrast to the European wine grape Vitis vinifera are its "slip-skin" that allows the skin of the grape berries to easily slip off when squeezed, instead of crushing the pulp, and the presence of tendrils on every node of the cane. Vitis labrusca also tends to have strong resistance to mildews and phylloxera. Another contrast with European V. vinifera are unique flavors, best known to most people through the Concord grape. The term "foxy" became a sort of catchall for the wine tasting descriptors used for these American wines that were distinct from the familiar flavors of the European viniferous wines. These flavors have been described as strawberry, raspberry, cotton candy, and "grapey" (because Americans associate these flavors with popular grape juices, candies, jellies and jams, sodas, and more made with Concord grapes). Occasionally, depending on the winemaking, V. labrusca grapes can impart a musky flavor to wine, which some find intriguing while others dislike, but this can be mitigated or increased by winegrowing and winemaking practices. Vitis labrusca is in the parentage of the world's most planted grape variety, Kyoho.

== History ==
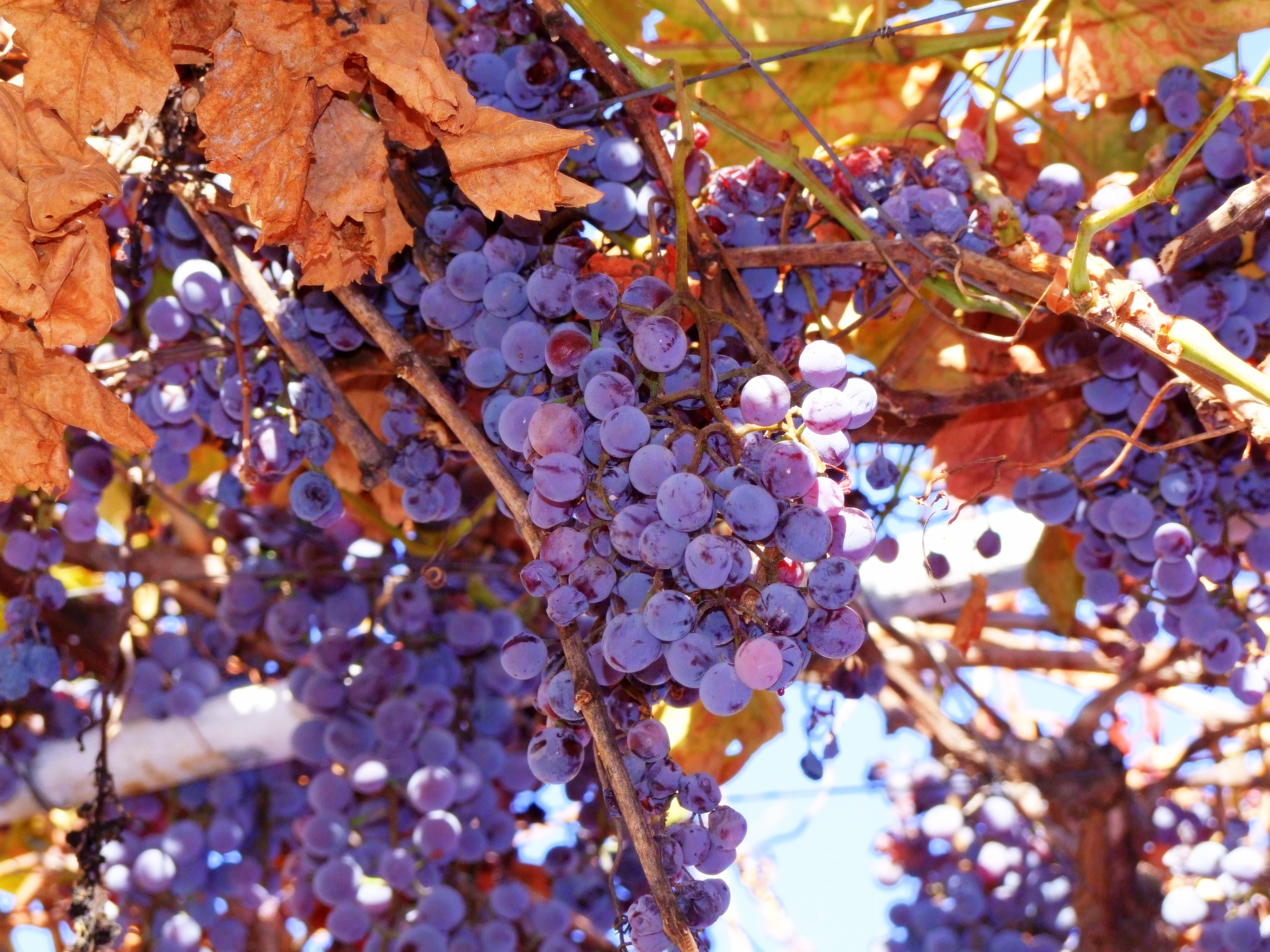
Concord grapes

According to wine historian Edward Hyams and wine expert Jancis Robinson, Vitis labrusca was probably the species seen by Leif Ericsson growing wild along the coast of Vinland in the 11th century. There is ample evidence that the labrusca was growing wild in North America before Europeans arrived. The vine was not officially identified and recorded until Carl Linnaeus and his peers started cataloging American vine species in the mid-18th century. In the 19th century, Vitis labrusca was among the American vines transported to Europe that were carrying the phylloxera louse that caused widespread devastation to the European vineyards planted with Vitis vinifera.

Also in the 19th century, Ephraim Bull of Concord, Massachusetts, cultivated seeds from wild labrusca vines to create the Concord grape, which would become an important agricultural crop in the United States.

== Vine characteristics ==
The majority of Vitis labrusca grape varieties are red, although white varieties such as Niagara and "pink-skinned" varieties such as Catawba have dark colored berries high in phenolic compounds that produce strongly flavored wines. As the berries near harvest and become fully ripe, they separate easily from the pedicel (berry stem). If the berry is squeezed gently between two fingers, the thick skin will slip easily off leaving the pulp intact as a ball. This trait gives Vitis labrusca the name of "slip skin" grapes. Another trait of labrusca that aids ampelographers in identification of vines and hybrid varieties descended from the species is the large, thick leaves of the vines that have a hairy underside with dense brown or white hairs.

Like many other American vine species, Vitis labrusca has some natural resistance to many grape diseases, including phylloxera. However, its resistance and grafting compatibility is not as high as that of other species, such as Vitis aestivalis, Vitis rupestris and Vitis berlandieri, and it is not often used for commercial rootstock. It is a robust plant, and in many states can be considered weedy or invasive.

== Vinification of Vitis labrusca ==
=== Vinification of Vitis labrusca in North America ===
==== Wine regions ====
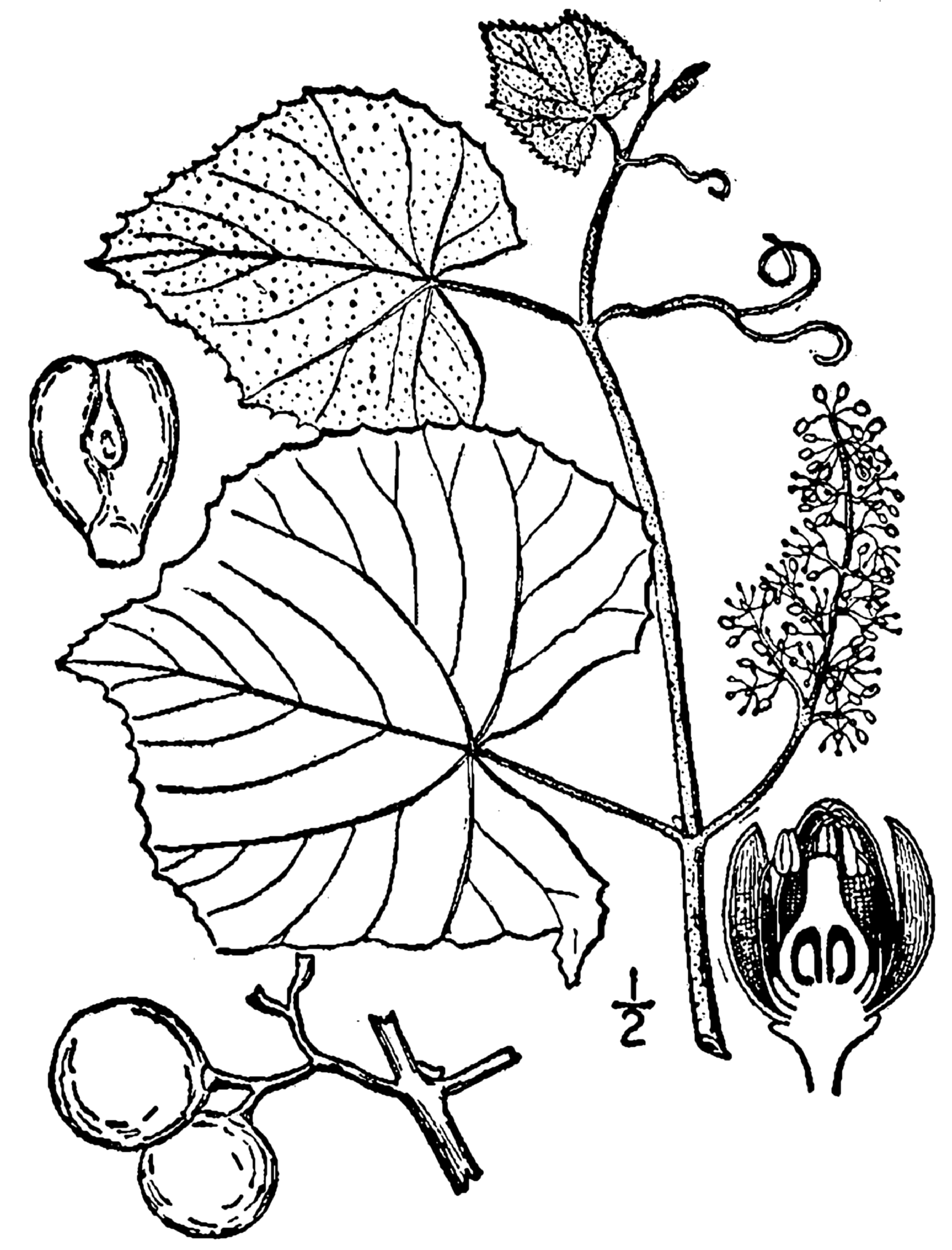
Botanical features of Vitis labrusca

Vitis labrusca is located along the eastern seaboard of North America from Nova Scotia down to Georgia and westward to the Mississippi River. Among American Viticultural Areas (AVA) that produce wine from labrusca or hybrids derived from labrusca are Alexandria Lakes, Upper Mississippi Valley, Mississippi Delta, Ohio River Valley, Southeastern New England, Lake Erie as well as several AVAs in the states of Connecticut, New York, Virginia, Ohio, Massachusetts, Michigan and Minnesota. In the Canadian Province of Ontario, the use of Vitis labrusca varieties is not permitted by the VQA regulatory and appellation system, except for Vidal, a hybrid grape varietal.

Unlike vinifera, hybrids and Vitis labrusca varieties can better withstand the severe continental conditions of eastern North America with severely cold winters and hot, humid summers. (However, labrusca doesn't do quite as well as varieties like Vitis rotundifolia in the humidity of southeastern US). In fact, in areas of the United States where vinifera does flourish in the west, the conditions during the growing season are often too arid for labrusca vines.

==== Wine varieties ====
In North America, Vitis labrusca and hybrid varieties are widely used to make various types of wines, including famous kosher wines such as Manischewitz and Mogen David. Both dark skinned varieties (such as Concord, Catawba, Delaware and Fredonia) and light-skinned varieties (such as Niagara, Elvira and Diamond) are frequently used. Some regional variations are made with Niabell grapes. Historically, Isabella grapes have been used for winemaking in America, but those have been largely replaced by other varieties.

=== Vinification of Vitis labrusca in Europe ===
==== Legal status of Vitis labrusca wine in Europe ====
Selling wine made with pure Vitis labrusca is illegal in the EU. This ban is extended to the labrusca hybrids such as Noah, Othello, Isabelle, Jacquez, Clinton, and Herbemont. However, certain labrusca × Vinifera hybrids are allowed to be used for winemaking, such as Concord and PIWI grapes.

== "Foxy" ==
According to University of California, Davis viticulture expert A. J. Winkler, outside of the vinifera Muscat family of grapes, Vitis labrusca varieties have the most pronounced aromas among wine grape varieties. While the description "foxy" has been thought to describe a unique, earthy and sweet muskiness that can be perceived in fresh Concord grapes as well as grape juice made from Concord and other labrusca varieties, the flavors also most commonly associated with these grapes include fruity aromas and flavors of strawberry and raspberry. In the 1920s, scientists were able to isolate the aroma compound responsible for the "foxy" musk as methyl anthranilate. These compounds are used to produce grape-flavored juices, candies, sodas, and other "grape-flavored" products.

== See also ==
- List of grape varieties
- Bangalore Blue
