= Alexander (grape) =

Variety of grape

- Grape (Vitis)
- Color of berry skin: Noir
- Species: Vitis labrusca × ?
- Also called: See list of synonyms
- Origin: United States

Alexander (also known as Tasker's Grape) is a spontaneous cross of vines from which the first commercial wines in America were made. It was discovered in 1740 in the neighborhood of Springgettsbury, Philadelphia, in a vineyard where James Alexander (d. 1778), Thomas Penn's gardener, had originally planted cuttings of Vitis vinifera in 1683. It was popularized by the Bartram family at Bartram's Garden, Philadelphia, and widely distributed after the American Revolution by William Bartram.

The Alexander grape is a hybrid grape of Vitis labrusca and another species, which may probably be Vitis vinifera.

== History ==
In the 18th century and much of the 19th century it was impossible to grow European wine grapes in the open air in the eastern half of North America. The Alexander combined disease and pest resistance from North American grapes with some of the better qualities of European wine grapes. It was an acceptable grape for large-scale planting and wine production. The Alexander was the basis for the first successful North American wine industry over much of the east coast, in Pennsylvania in the 1790s, in Virginia, Maryland, New Jersey, Ohio, and in Indiana in 1806.

The Alexander grape may be extinct, and it is not known if any live material of the variety still exists.

In the foothills of the Appalachian Mountains near the Hocking Hills Le Petit Chevalier Vineyards and Farm Winery provides guests the opportunity to taste Alexander wine from vines grown in the vineyard.

== Synonyms ==
Alexander is also known under the synonyms Alexandria, Black Cape, Black Grape, Buck Grape, Cape, Cape Grape, Clifton's Constantia, Clifton's Lombardia, Columbian, Constantia, Farkers Grape, Madeira of York, Rothrock, Rothrock Of Prince, Schuylkill, Schuylkill Muscadel, Schuylkill Muscadine, Springmill Constantia, Tasker's Grape, Vevay, Vevay Winne, Winne, and York Lisbon.

=== Other grape varieties ===
Alexander is also a synonym of another American hybrid grape variety, Isabella. There is also a separate Alexander Winter grape variety.
