= De Chaunac =

Variety of grape

De Chaunac is a French-American hybrid wine grape variety used to make red wines. It was developed by Albert Seibel c. 1860. It is also known as Seibel 9549 and is a cross of Seibel 5163 and possibly Seibel 793. The grape was named after Adhemar de Chaunac, a French-born Canadian wine pioneer in the Ontario wine industry.

De Chaunac is known to be early ripening, have a very vigorous growth habit and good resistance to both powdery mildew and downy mildew. It is grown in varying amounts for wine production across the northeastern side of North America, especially in the winegrowing regions of New York, Pennsylvania, Nova Scotia, Ontario, Michigan, Ohio, and other northeastern winegrowing areas.
