= Massachusetts wine =

Wine from Massachusetts

Coordinates: 42°26′40″N 71°36′33″W

Massachusetts
- Wine region
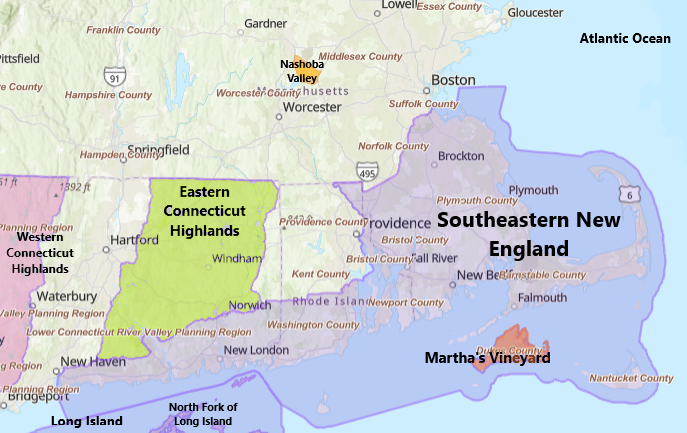
- Massachusetts AVAs
- Official name: Commonwealth of Massachusetts
- Type: U.S. State Appellation
- Year established: 1788
- Years of wine industry: 126
- Country: United States
- Sub-regions: Southeastern New England AVA, Martha's Vineyard AVA, Nashoba Valley AVA
- Growing season: 145-210 days
- Climate region: Region Ia-III
- Heat units: 2,500-3,087 GDD units
- Precipitation (annual average): 17.24 to 44 inches (438–1,118 mm)
- Soil conditions: Moderately drained silt loam, sandy loam, parent soil of supraglacial and subglacial till, alluvial and glaciofluvial deposits, well-drained loamy soils
- Total area: 4.99 million acres (7,800 sq mi)
- Size of planted vineyards: 300 acres (121 ha)
- Grapes produced: Albarino, Arandell, Aurore, Cabernet Franc, Cabernet Sauvignon, Cayuga, Chardonnay, Concord, Lemberger, Marquette, Marechal Foch, Pinot noir, Riesling, Seyval blanc, St. Croix, Vidal blanc, Vignoles
- No. of wineries: 18

Massachusetts wine refers to wine made from grapes grown in the U.S. state of Massachusetts. Most of the wine grape vineyards and wineries in the Bay State are located in the southern half within the boundaries of its initial American Viticultural Area (AVA) established in 1984, Southeastern New England. Although the coastal conditions moderate the cold climate, many wineries rely upon cold-hardy French hybrid varietals like Seyval, Vidal blanc, and Marechal Foch, Martha's Vineyard AVA, the 1985 sub-appellation of Southeastern New England, also has a milder climate while the much warmer inland region, established in March 2026, Nashoba Valley AVA.
Martha's Vineyard island climate is milder, being more strongly influenced by surrounding waters than coastal New England growing Cabernet Sauvignon, Chardonnay, Gewurztraminer, Merlot, Pinot Noir, White Riesling. Nashoba Valley warmer inland climate is suitable for growing varietals such as Albarino, Cabernet Franc, Chardonnay, Riesling, and St. Croix among others. There are over 55 wineries in Massachusetts located entirely within its boundaries.

== History ==
Viticulture in Massachusetts dates to the 17th century, but Vitis vinifera didn't arrive until much later due to the region's long, cold winters and high disease pressure. Early farmers relied instead on native North American grape varieties before the introduction of hybrids like Seyval Blanc and Marechal Foch bred for cold hardiness and fungal resistance.
Most grapes grown throughout New England have been for table use rather than for the production of wine; however, local wineries produced wine from grapes grown along the New England coast for many years prior to Prohibition. For example, the Devil's Food Winery in Quonset Point, Rhode Island, grew 300 acres (120 ha) of grapes and sold wines as far away as Chicago from 1900 until the advent of Prohibition in 1919. Commercial grape growing along the southern New England coast resumed in the 1960s with plantings of French Hybrid grapes in Western Connecticut. The relatively mild climate of the viticultural area, and availability of modern technology has enabled both French Hybrids and Vinifera grapes to grow within the area. Also, the passage of farm winery laws by Connecticut, Rhode Island, and Massachusetts has encouraged the planting of vineyards and establishment of wineries. Since the early 1960s, more than 200 acres (81 ha) of wine grapes have been planted in 30 commercial vineyards, and more acreage is planned. Vineyards are distributed throughout the viticultural area with plantings in Stonington, Connecticut, surrounding Narragansett Bay and on the islands in the bay in Rhode Island, and in Plymouth, Norfolk, and Bristol Counties, Massachusetts, as well as on Martha's Vineyard and Nantucket Island. Varieties include Chardonnay, White Reisling, Pinot Noir, other Vinifera grapes, and French Hybrids.

Prior to the entry of Europeans, Martha's Vineyard island was called "Cappwadck" or "Noe-pe" by its Indian inhabitants. Its well-known name was given to the island in 1602 by Bartholomew Gosnold, an agent for Sir Walter Raleigh. Although the identity of "Martha" is a bone of contention among island historians, the "vineyard" referred to the proliferation of native American grape vines on the island. In succeeding years, the island was referred to as Martha's or Martin's Vineyard. By 1640 after the first permanent settlement on the island, it was firmly ed as "Martha's Vineyard." Viticulture on the island was recorded in the journal of two members of the original party which landed on Martha's Vineyard in 1602 described the island as "An incredible store of vines, as well as in the Woodie part of the island, where they run upon every tree, as upon the outward parts that we could not goe for treading upon them." Although the island abundantly grows native American grapes, the fruit was not cultivated until 1971 when George and Catherine Mathiesen purchased in West Tisbury, a piece of land with sandy soil and an unpredictable climate. The couple obtained 20 years worth of weather records from Vineyard Gazette editor Henry Beetle Hough, planted six acres (2 ha) with grapes and three years later harvested their first crop. The Mathiesen family operated the vineyard and winery business named Chicama Vineyards for decades even after George and Catherine's passing. However, in 2008, the family shuttered its doors selling the winery and vineyard to new owners who converted the property to a horse ranch.

Commercial wine production in the state is marked by the 1978 establishment of Nashoba Valley Winery in Bolton. In the following decades, Vitis vinifera varieties like Riesling, Chardonnay, and Cabernet Franc became successful with improvements in vineyard management. In the 2020s, efforts to a federally recognized AVA emerged, citing distinct glacial soils, hilly topography, and climatic differences from surrounding the valley region.

== Terroir ==
=== Topography ===
Southeastern New England is descriptive of the land adjoining coastal bodies of water in eastern Connecticut, Rhode Island, and Massachusetts south of the Boston area. It has been used by the New England River Basins Commission to describe this portion of New England.
Martha's Vineyard is an island surrounded on the north by Vineyard Sound, on the east by Nantucket Sound, and on the south and west by the Atlantic Ocean. The greatest length of the island from east to west is 19 miles (31 km), and greatest width about 9.5 miles (15 km). Total size of Martha's Vineyard is approximately 100 square miles (64,000 acres).
Nashoba Valley is the name given to a region of Massachusetts in northwestern Middlesex and northeastern Worcester Counties that roughly encompasses the landform around the interchange of Interstate 495 and Massachusetts Route 2. Although the name "Nashoba Valley" applies to the entire region, commercial viticulture currently occurs only in the Worcester County portion of the valley. Therefore, the Nashoba Valley viticultural area is limited to the portion of the valley that is in Worcester County. The mesoscale impact on the Nashoba Valley region compared to surrounding areas greatly alters the climate. Weather, temperature wind, and humidity are all effected by this valley and are major factors as to how viticulture can be successful in a cold weather growing environment.

=== Climate ===
Climate distinguishes the Southeastern New England viticultural area from surrounding areas located with a climate not unlike that of France's Burgundy region, with its sandy soil and mild, ocean-modulated climate warmed by Gulf Stream breezes. The area is shown on U.S. Weather Service climatic division maps as the coastal climatic divisions of Connecticut, Rhode Island, and Massachusetts. Climate within this area is moderated by its proximity to the Atlantic Ocean and various coastal bays including Block Island Sound, Narragansett Bay, Rhode Island Sound, Buzzards Bay, Cape Cod Bay, and Massachusetts Bay. The area is uniformly low Region I on the scale developed by Winkler and Amerine of the University of California to measure degree days. The growing season of 180 days is longer and more uniform than either adjacent New England or the recognized grape-growing regions of New York. The growing season in the Hudson River Region averages 153 days while nearby interior portions of New England average about 150 days. Precipitation in the Southeastern New England viticultural area averages 44 inches a year. The average daily temperature in January is 30 °F (−1 °C), and in July 70 °F (21 °C), and the mean daily range of temperature during the growing season is 20 °F (−7 °C) or less.

Although Martha's Vineyard is a part of the Southeastern New England viticultural area, its climate is milder, being more strongly influenced by surrounding waters than coastal New England. As an island, Martha's Vineyard is influenced by coastal winds blowing from all directions, unlike the New England coast which is influenced by ocean winds blowing from the south. These coastal winds moderate the climate of Martha's Vineyard. In the spring, winds travel over cool ocean waters causing a late island spring but protecting grapes from spring frost. In the fall, ocean winds influenced by warm water prolong the growing season. Consequently, the Martha's Vineyard growing season averages 210 days as compared to 180 days on the New England coast. Summer winds also keep grape vines dry preventing rot and mildew. In winter, snowfall is significantly less and rainfall greater than that of coastal New England. Martha's Vineyard may be classified as a high Region I with an average of 2450 degree days. Other parts of the Southeastern New England viticultural area average low Region I, and winters tend to be colder and summers warmer than on Martha's Vineyard due to the temperature differences stemming from the moderating ocean influences.

Nashoba Valley has a warm climate suitable for growing grape varietals such as Albarino, Cabernet Franc, Chardonnay, Riesling, and St. Croix, among others. Throughout the growing season, average monthly temperatures range from a low of 47 to 72 °F (8–22 °C). July is typically the warmest month when then average high temperature is 82 °F (28 °C). The AVA has an average of 3,087 °F (1,697 °C) growing degree days (GDDs) calculated in degrees Celsius, which places it in Region III of the Winkler system. According to the petition, wind is another climate factor that affects viticulture within the AVA. The petition states that between March and May, average wind speeds within the AVA range from 6.6 to 4.7 miles per hour (11–8 km/h). In the springtime, air movement through the vineyards can reduce the risk of frost damage to new tender shoots and buds. However, more intense winds during the same period can damage shoots and flowers, which will lead to a smaller harvest. During the summer months of June to August, average wind speeds range from 4.2 to 3.79 miles per hour (7–6 km/h). According to the petition, humidity increases and rainstorms are common within the AVA during the summer, so the gentle winds can decrease the time it takes for vineyards to dry and lessen the potential for molds and mildews to form.

=== Soils ===
Vineyards near the ocean have sandy soil, but farther inland, the soil is mineral-rich glacial till, from glaciation that took place 10,000 years ago, composed of granite, flint, shale and basalt. Geologically, Martha's Vineyard was formed by a glacial moraine. Soils are deep, well drained sand and sandy loam, some of which are in the rocky phase. Nashoba Valley has parent soil of supraglacial till, subglacial till, alluvial deposits, and glaciofluvial deposits. Its soils are classified by the U.S. Department of Agriculture (USDA) as "prime farmland," which means that they have specific physical and chemical characteristics that make them well suited for growing crops.

== See also ==
- American wine
- List of wineries in New England
