= Rhode Island wine =

Wine from Rhode Island

Coordinates: 41°39′58″N 71°42′51″W

Rhode Island
- Wine region
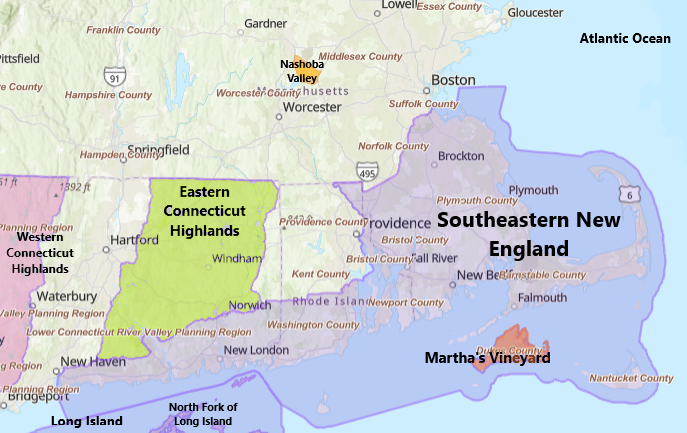
- Other names: The Ocean State
- Type: U.S. State Appellation
- Year established: 1790
- Years of wine industry: 51
- Country: United States
- Sub-regions: Southeastern New England AVA
- Growing season: 180+ days
- Climate region: Region Ia-II
- Heat units: 3,000 GDD units
- Precipitation (annual average): 29 inches (737 mm)
- Total area: 661,760 acres (1,034 sq mi)
- Size of planted vineyards: 200 acres (81 ha)
- No. of vineyards: 11
- Grapes produced: Cabernet Franc, Chardonnay, Grigio, Landot, Lemberger, Merlot, Pinot Blanc, Pinot Noir, Riesling
- No. of wineries: 15

Rhode Island wine refers to wine made from grapes grown in the U.S. state appellation of Rhode Island. Viticulture in Rhode Island began in 1663 when King Charles II of England included wine production among the land uses approved in the royal charter establishing Rhode Island as an English colony.
The modern wine industry of Rhode Island began in 1975 when Sakonnet Vineyards was established near Little Compton. Most of the wine grape vineyards and wineries are located in portions of Bristol, Newport, Providence and Washington Counties occupying the Ocean State's northeastern, eastern and southern areas within the boundaries of Southeastern New England, its only American Viticultural Area (AVA) established in 1984. Offshore of the Atlantic Ocean, the Gulf Stream-warmed Rhode Island Sound and Narragansett Bay provide tremendous maritime moderation in both summer and winter, making Rhode Island one of the most moderate climates of the Northeastern United States where both cool-climate vinifera and hybrid grape varieties are grown in the maritime-influenced state.

== History ==
Viticulture in New England dates to the 17th century, but Vitis vinifera didn't arrive until much later due to the region's long, cold winters and high disease pressure. Early farmers relied instead on native North American grape varieties, Vitis labrusca, before the introduction of hybrids like Seyval Blanc and Marechal Foch bred for cold hardiness and fungal resistance. Most grapes grown throughout New England have been for table use rather than for the production of wine; however, local wineries produced wine from grapes grown along the New England coast for many years prior to Prohibition. For example, the Devil's Food Winery in Quonset Point, Rhode Island, grew 300 acres (120 ha) of grapes and sold wines as far away as Chicago from 1900 until the advent of Prohibition in 1919.
Commercial grape growing along the southern New England coast resumed in the 1960s with plantings of French Hybrid grapes in Western Connecticut. The relatively mild climate of the viticultural area, and availability of modern technology has enabled both French Hybrids and Vinifera grapes to grow within the area. Also, the passage of farm winery laws by Connecticut, Rhode Island, and Massachusetts has encouraged the planting of vineyards and establishment of wineries. Since the early 1960s, more than 200 acres (81 ha) of wine grapes have been planted in 30 commercial vineyards, and more acreage is planned. Vineyards are distributed throughout the viticultural area with plantings in Stonington, Connecticut, surrounding Narragansett Bay and on the islands in the bay in Rhode Island, and in Plymouth, Norfolk, and Bristol Counties, Massachusetts, as well as on Martha's Vineyard and Nantucket Island. Varieties include Chardonnay, White Reisling, Pinot Noir, other Vinifera grapes, and French Hybrids.

== Terroir ==
=== Climate ===
Climate distinguishes the Southeastern New England viticultural area from surrounding areas located with a climate not unlike that of France's Burgundy region, with its sandy soil and mild, ocean-modulated climate warmed by Gulf Stream breezes. The area is part of that area shown on U.S. Weather Service climatic division maps as the coastal climatic divisions of Connecticut, Rhode Island, and Massachusetts. Climate within this area is moderated by its proximity to the Atlantic Ocean and various coastal bays including Block Island Sound, Narragansett Bay, Rhode Island Sound, Buzzards Bay, Cape Cod Bay, and Massachusetts Bay. The area is uniformly low Region I on the scale developed by Winkler and Amerine of the University of California to measure degree days, however, Rhode Island's warmer northeastern region is Region II. The growing season of 180 days is longer and more uniform than either adjacent New England or the recognized grape-growing regions of New York. The growing season in the Hudson River Region averages 153 days while nearby interior portions of New England average about 150 days. Annual precipitation in the Southeastern New England viticultural area averages 44 inches (1,118 mm). The average daily temperature in January is 30 °F (−1 °C), and in July 70 °F (21 °C), and the mean daily range of temperature during the growing season is 20 °F (−7 °C) or less.

=== Soil ===
Vineyards near the ocean have sandy soil, but farther inland, the soil is mineral-rich glacial till, from glaciation that took place 10,000 years ago, composed of granite, flint, shale and basalt.

== See also ==
- American wine
- List of wineries in New England
