= Nashoba Valley AVA =

American Viticultural Area in Massachusetts

Coordinates: 42°25′52″N 71°36′59″W

Nashoba Valley
- Wine region
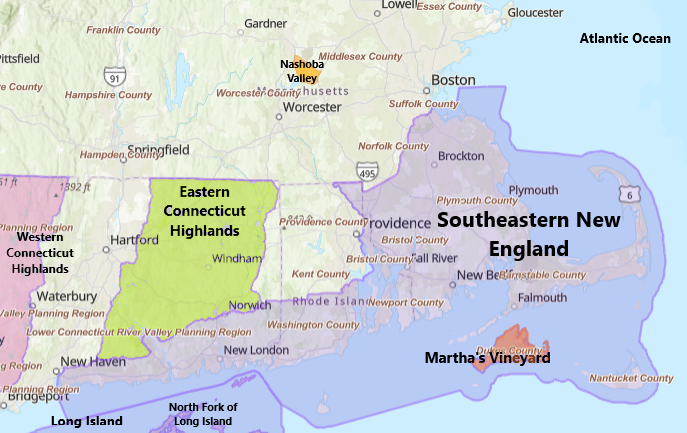
- Massachusetts AVAs
- Type: American Viticultural Area
- Year established: 2026
- Country: United States
- Part of: Massachusetts
- Other regions in Massachusetts: Martha's Vineyard AVA, Southeastern New England AVA
- Growing season: 145 days
- Climate region: Region III
- Heat units: 1,697 °C (3,087 °F) GDD units
- Precipitation (annual average): 17.24 in (437.90 mm)
- Soil conditions: Parent soil of supraglacial and subglacial till, alluvial and glaciofluvial deposits, well-drained loamy soils and are moderately deep to very deep
- Total area: 18,367.5 acres (29 sq mi)
- Size of planted vineyards: 16 acres (6.5 ha)
- No. of vineyards: 3
- Grapes produced: Albarino, Arandell, Cabernet Franc, Chardonnay, Lemberger, Marquette, Riesling, Seyval Blanc, St. Croix, Vignoles

Nashoba Valley is an American Viticultural Area (AVA) located in the Nashoba Valley landform within northwestern Middlesex and northeastern Worcester Counties, Massachusetts. It was established as the nation's 278^{th} and the state's third appellation by the Alcohol and Tobacco Tax and Trade Bureau (TTB), Treasury on March 24, 2026, after reviewing the petition submitted by Justin Pelletier, Chief Operating Officer and Quality Control Manager of Nashoba Valley Winery, proposing the viticultural area named "Nashoba Valley." The AVA's borders are as such: Route 117 to the north, I-495 to the east, I-190 to the west, and a series of roads to the south near the Wachusett Reservoir.

The name "Nashoba" (/næ.ʃˈo..ʊbə/ nuh-SHOH-buh) is primarily a male name of Native American origin, specifically from the Chickasaw language, meaning "wolf" or "wolf spirit." The appellation contains approximately 18,367.5 acres (29 sq mi) with, at the outset, three vineyards cultivating sixteen acres (6 ha) within the AVA. The distinguishing features of Nashoba Valley include its soils and climate.

== History ==
Viticulture in Massachusetts dates to the 17th century, but Vitis vinifera didn't arrive until much later due to the region's long, cold winters and high disease pressure. Early farmers relied instead on native North American grape varieties before the introduction of hybrids like Seyval Blanc and Marechal Foch bred for cold hardiness and fungal resistance. Commercial wine production is marked by the 1978 establishment of Nashoba Valley Winery in Bolton. In the following decades, Vitis vinifera varieties like Riesling, Chardonnay, and Cabernet Franc became successful with improvements in vineyard management. In the 2020s, efforts to establish a federally recognized AVA emerged, citing distinct glacial soils, hilly topography, and climatic differences from surrounding areas.

== Terroir ==
=== Topography ===
Nashoba Valley is the name given to a region of Massachusetts in northwestern Middlesex and northeastern Worcester Counties that roughly encompasses the landform around the interchange of Interstate 495 and Massachusetts Route 2. Although the name "Nashoba Valley" applies to the entire region, commercial viticulture currently occurs only in the Worcester County portion of the valley. Therefore, the Nashoba Valley viticultural area is limited to the portion of the valley that is in Worcester County. The mesoscale impact on the Nashoba Valley region compared to surrounding areas greatly alters the climate. Weather, temperature wind, and humidity are all effected by this valley and are major factors as to how viticulture can be successful in a cold weather growing environment.

=== Climate ===
Nashoba Valley AVA has a warm climate suitable for growing grape varietals such as Albarino, Cabernet Franc, Chardonnay, Riesling, and St. Croix, among others. Throughout the growing season, average monthly temperatures range from a low of 47 to 72 °F (8–22 °C). July is typically the warmest month when the average high temperature is 82 °F (28 °C). The Nashoba Valley AVA has an average of 1,697 °C (3,087 °F) growing degree days (GDDs) calculated in degrees Celsius, which places it in Region III of the Winkler system. According to the petition, wind is another climate factor that affects viticulture within the AVA. The petition states that between March and May, average wind speeds within the AVA range from 6.6 to 4.7 miles per hour (11–8 km/h). In the springtime, air movement through the vineyards can reduce the risk of frost damage to new tender shoots and buds. However, more intense winds during the same period can damage shoots and flowers, which will lead to a smaller harvest. During the summer months of June to August, average wind speeds range from 4.2 to 3.79 miles per hour (7–6 km/h). According to the petition, humidity increases and rainstorms are common within the AVA during the summer, so the gentle winds can decrease the time it takes for vineyards to dry and lessen the potential for molds and mildews to form. To the north, the town of Fitchburg has a cooler climate than the AVA. Fitchburg's average GDD accumulations total 1,536 °C (2,797 °F), placing it in the Region II category. Average monthly temperatures are lower for each month except July, when they are the same as the average monthly temperature for the AVA. Additionally, Fitchburg has lower monthly average wind speeds. To the east, the city of Waltham's average GDD accumulations place it in the Region III category, which is the same as the AVA. However, Waltham still has higher average GDD accumulations than the AVA, with 1,738 °C (3,160 °F) GDDs. Waltham also has higher average monthly wind speeds than the AVA, ranging from 4.3 to 7.6 miles per hour (7–12 km/h). South of the AVA, the city of Worcester's climate is classified as Region II, with an average accumulation of 1,598 °C (2,908 °F) GDDs. During the growing season, Worcester also has slightly lower average monthly temperatures and average monthly wind speeds than the AVA. To the west of the AVA, the town of Barre also has a Region II climate, with average accumulations of 1,548 °C (2,818 °F) GDDs and lower average monthly temperatures throughout the year. Average monthly wind speeds in Barre are also lower each month than wind speeds within the AVA. The USDA plant hardiness zone is 6a to 6b.

=== Soils ===
Nashoba Valley AVA has parent soil of supraglacial till, subglacial till, alluvial deposits, and glaciofluvial deposits. The petition notes that soils within the proposed AVA are classified by the U.S. Department of Agriculture (USDA) as "prime farmland," which means that they have specific physical and chemical characteristics that make them well suited for growing crops. The most common soils in the proposed AVA belong to the Paxton soil series and comprise approximately 21 percent of the soils in the AVA. These soils are well-drained loamy soils and are moderately deep to very deep. The soil depth allows for unobstructed root growth, as roots can penetrate moderately deeply before hitting denser soils and very deeply before touching bedrock. The petition also states that the soils promote strong root systems that allow grapevines to survive the harsher winters within the proposed AVA. Paxton soils also have high saturated hydraulic conductivity values, which means that water moves quickly through the soil. The petition states this soil characteristic is essential for successful viticulture as it aids in minimizing fungal infections and rot. To the immediate north of the proposed AVA are Fort Devens and the Bolton Flats Wildlife Management Area, which are not available for commercial viticulture. Further north, the soils have a slower water infiltration rate and do not drain as quickly as soils within the proposed AVA. East of the proposed AVA, the soils have a very slow water infiltration rate and a high-water table, increasing both the risk of flooding and fungal disease in vineyards. The region south of the proposed AVA is largely urban, with little land left open for agriculture to occur. The petition notes that what open land does exist is not classified as "prime farmland" by the USDA. To the west, the soils are shallower than within the proposed AVA and have a slow water infiltration rate.

== See also ==
- Massachusetts Wine
