= Connecticut wine =

Wine from Connecticut

Coordinates: 41°53′34″N 73°13′26″W

Connecticut
- Wine region
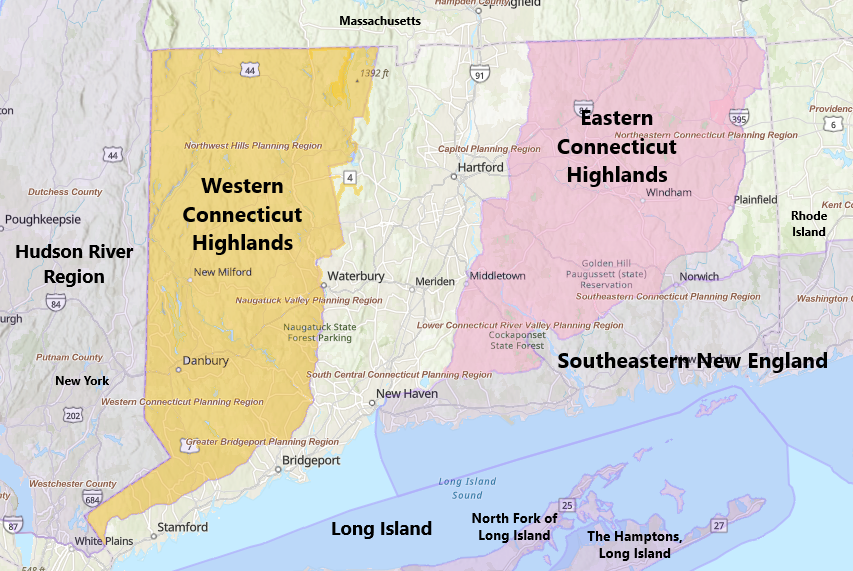
- Connecticut AVAs
- Official name: State of Connecticut
- Type: U.S. State Appellation
- Year established: 1788
- Years of wine industry: 66
- Country: United States
- Other regions in vicinity: Massachusetts, New York
- Sub-regions: Southeastern New England AVA, Western Connecticut Highlands AVA, Eastern Connecticut Highlands AVA
- Climate region: Continental
- Total area: 3.1 million acres (4,842 sq mi)
- Grapes produced: Aurore, Cabernet Franc, Cabernet Sauvignon, Cayuga, Chambourcin, Chardonel, Chardonnay, Frontenac, Gewurztraminer, Marechal Foch, Merlot, Pinot gris, Riesling, Seyval blanc, St. Croix, Vidal blanc, Vignoles
- No. of wineries: 25

Connecticut wine refers to wine made from grapes and other fruit grown in the U.S. state of Connecticut. State names in the United States automatically qualify as legal appellations of origin for wine produced from grapes grown in that state and do not require registration with the Alcohol and Tobacco Tax and Trade Bureau (TTB) of the Treasury Department. TTB was created in January 2003, when the Bureau of Alcohol, Tobacco and Firearms, or ATF, was extensively reorganized under the provisions of the Homeland Security Act of 2002.

The modern wine industry in Connecticut began with the passage of the Connecticut Winery Act in 1978. The wineries in Connecticut are located throughout the state, including its three designated American Viticultural Areas (AVA). The climate in the coastal region near Long Island Sound and the Connecticut River valley tends to be warmer than the highlands in the eastern and western sides of the state.

== Connecticut Wine Trail ==
The Connecticut (CT) Wine Trail is a route linking participating winery locations in the state of Connecticut. As of 2026, there are 36 farm wineries on the trail. Members of the CT Wine Trail participate with other Connecticut farm wineries in the Passport to Connecticut Farm Wineries sponsored by the Connecticut Farm Wine Development Council and the Connecticut Department of Agriculture.
Sherman P. Haight Jr. of Haight Vineyard in Litchfield conceived of the idea of the wine trail in 1988. It was officially dedicated by the state in 1992 with five wineries. The trail has grown over time: 8 in 2001 10 in 2004, 15 in 2006, 23 in 2011, and 33 in 2016.

Connecticut Wine Trail Logo

== See also ==
- List of wineries in New England
