= Nashoba =

Nashoba may refer to:

- Nashoba, Oklahoma
- Nashoba Commune
- Nashoba County, Indian Territory, a political subdivision of the Choctaw Nation
- Nashoba Valley, Massachusetts
- Nashoba Valley Ski Area
- Nashoba Regional High School
