= Eastern Connecticut Highlands AVA =

American Viticultural Area in Connecticut

Coordinates: 41°48′52″N 72°00′42″W

Eastern Connecticut Highlands
- Wine region
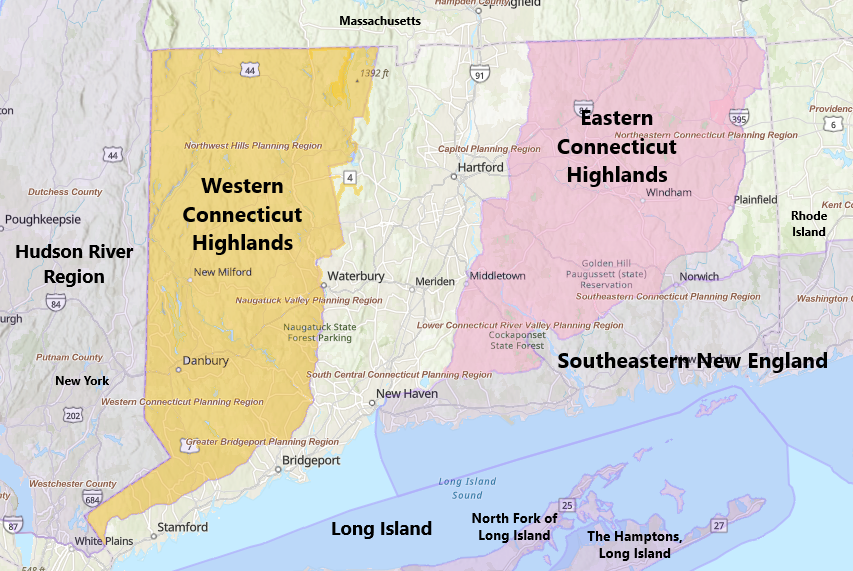
- Connecticut AVAs
- Type: American Viticultural Area
- Year established: 2019
- Country: United States
- Part of: Connecticut
- Other regions in Connecticut: Southeastern New England AVA, Western Connecticut Highlands AVA
- Growing season: 204 days
- Climate region: Region II
- Heat units: 2.780 GDD units
- Precipitation (annual average): 17.24 inches (437.90 mm)
- Soil conditions: Lodgement and ablation “meltout” till, mineral schist
- Total area: 797,000 acres; 3,230 square kilometres (1,246 sq mi)
- Size of planted vineyards: 114.75 acres (46.4 ha)
- No. of vineyards: 20+
- Grapes produced: Cayuga, Cabernet Franc, Chardonnay, Dornfelder, Frontenac, Gamay, Merlot, Pinot noir, Seyval blanc, St. Croix, Traminette, Vidal, Vignoles
- No. of wineries: 12

Eastern Connecticut Highlands is an American Viticultural Area (AVA) located in Hartford, Middlesex, New Haven, New London, Tolland, and Windham counties that covers the eastern third of the State encompassing approximately 1,246 square miles (797,000 acres; 3,230 km^{2}). It was established as the state's third AVA on October 11, 2019 by the Alcohol and Tobacco Tax and Trade Bureau (TTB), Treasury after reviewing the petition submitted by Steven Vollweiler, president of Sharpe Hill Vineyard, on behalf of local winegrowers and vintners, proposing the viticultural area named "Eastern Connecticut Highlands."
The wine appellation is not within nor overlaps any other AVA. At the outset, there were 16 commercially producing vineyards covering a total of approximately 114.75 acres (46.4 ha) as well as 6 bonded wineries within the area. According to the petition, an additional 20.5 acres (8.3 ha) of commercial vineyards were planned in the next few years. Eastern Connecticut Highlands is composed of rolling hills with elevations of 200 to 1,000 feet (61–305 m). There are pronounced ridgelines to the east and west with higher elevations. The region is relatively cool, with a short growing season between mid-May and mid-September. Its climate is similar to the Finger Lakes region of New York and the soil is composed of glacial till. Local vintners have had the most success with cool climate Vitis vinifera and French hybrid grape varieties. The region hardiness zone range is 6a to 7a. Sharpe Hill Vineyard in Pomfret is the largest and oldest winery in the AVA. The vineyard authored the petition proposing the establishment of the AVA. The distinguishing features of the Eastern Connecticut Highlands AVA are its geology, topography, soils, and climate.

== Name Evidence ==
The name Eastern Connecticut Highlands, is a geographical term that has been in use for over a hundred years. Highlands, referred to in some of the older literature and usage as uplands, flank a central lowland area in both Connecticut and Massachusetts. The lowland is underlain by relatively young easily eroded sedimentary and igneous rocks. The Connecticut River flows through the lowland area. The highlands, on the other hand, are underlain by older rocks that are more difficult to erode and hence they stand with higher relief. The highlands are referred to as the western highlands and the eastern highlands. It is this geographic term, western highlands, that the petitioner for the Western Connecticut Highlands AVA used for their name evidence; they added Connecticut, as we also propose, to distinguish the highlands of Connecticut from the highlands of Massachusetts. The term eastern highlands (western highlands as well) has been used in the geographic, geologic and climatologic literature for many years to describe the highland/upland areas to the east and west of the Central Valley of Connecticut.

== History ==
Viticulture in this region is increasing since its commercial beginnings in the last century before the advent of Prohibition. After the Repeal of Prohibition in 1933, viticulture did not re-emerge in the area until the 1980's where a few commercial vineyards with Hamlett Hill being the only one associated with a winery. In 2019, at least twenty vineyards were identified and new vineyards are still being planted. Total acreage is approximately 116 acres (47 ha) under vine with additional acreage planned. Local vintners and winegrowers are dedicated to the ongoing and growth of viticulture in this region and support the establishment of the AVA.

== Terroir ==
=== Geology ===
According to the petition, the varying resistance to erosion of the underlying rocks determines the topography and the physiographic provinces of Connecticut. Eastern Connecticut Highlands AVA is underlain by a Paleozoic formation generally referred to by geologists as Iapetus Terrane, named for the ancient ocean that once covered the region. The Iapetus Terrane is composed largely of metamorphic rocks that are difficult to erode, resulting in the hills and mountains that characterize the landscape of the AVA. The underlying geology also plays a major role in the formation of soils within the AVA. To the west of the AVA, the region known as the Central Valley is underlain by younger, more easily eroded sandstone, shale, and basalt lava flows that have a significantly different chemical composition than the geological formations of the AVA. The regions to the east and south of the AVA are part of the Avalonia Terrane, which consists of older, Pre-Cambrian rocks.

=== Topography ===
Eastern Connecticut Highlands AVA is characterized by hilly-to-mountainous terrain. Elevations range from about 200 feet (61 m) in the valley floors between the hills to just more than 1,000 feet (300 m) at the highest elevations in the northern portion. Along the eastern and western edges of the AVA, the hills that run along the Eastern Border fault and the Lake Char Fault were formed from erosion-resistant metamorphic rocks. As a result, these hills tend to have sharp ridgelines and high elevations. In the central portion of the AVA, the hills formed from metamorphic rocks that were less erosion-resistant than the rocks along the eastern and western edges. As a result, the hills in the central portion of the AVA are more rounded and are "closely crammed together, almost nudging each other for more space." The petition states that the tops of these hills have concordant elevations, meaning that one hilltop will have about the same elevation as the neighboring hills. The hilltop elevations decrease as one moves from north to south. The petition states that if one were to imagine placing a gigantic sheet of plywood on top of the hills, the plywood would form a plane that gently slopes southward at about 10 to 20 feet per mile. By contrast, the region to the west of the AVA is a broad, flat valley. Elevations within the valley range from about 150 to 250 feet (46–76 m). South of the AVA, within the region known as the Coastal Slope, elevations are also generally lower ranging from sea level to about 400 feet (120 m). The shoreline of this coastal region consists of rocky prominences separated by coves and tidal lands that may extend several miles inland. The highlands terrain of the AVA extends north into Massachusetts and east into Rhode Island, but the elevations differ in those locations. The petition states that the highlands of Massachusetts have generally higher elevations than the AVA. The petition also notes that the highlands of Rhode Island diminish as one moves eastward, and the elevations become lower. The petition states that topography affects viticulture within the Eastern Connecticut Highlands AVA because topography impacts the climate of a region. Regions with higher elevations, such as the AVA, generally have a colder climate than regions with lower elevations, such as the neighboring Central Valley. Additionally, regions that are closer to the coast, such as the Coastal Slope region south of the AVA and the lower elevations of Rhode Island, are more significantly affected by maritime climate than higher inland regions. Temperatures affect the varietals of grapes that can be successfully grown in any given area.

=== Climate ===
The petition included information on the average annual temperatures, growing degree days (GDD), coldest recorded temperature, average date of the latest spring frost, and average date of the earliest fall frost for the Eastern Connecticut Highlands AVA and the surrounding regions. The data was gathered from 1996 to 2015 and is included in the petition. The data shows that the proposed AVA has average annual temperatures that are generally similar to the surrounding locations. However, this data also shows more pronounced differences in other climate measurements. When compared to the region to the north, the proposed AVA has significantly higher GDD accumulations than all three northern locations, indicating warmer growing season temperatures. The AVA also has a generally shorter growing season than two of the northern locations, as indicated by the later last-spring-frost date and earlier first-fall-frost date. Compared to the regions to the south and east, the AVA has lower GDD accumulations than two of the locations. The proposed AVA also has a shorter growing season than all four of the southern and eastern comparison locations, which are closer to the Long Island Sound and thus benefit from temperature-moderating marine breezes. Finally, compared to the Central Valley region to the west, the AVA has lower GDD accumulations and a shorter growing season than both western comparison locations. The petition states that the GDD accumulations within the Eastern Connecticut Highlands AVA and each of the surrounding regions are sufficient to ripen most Vitis vinifera varietals. However, the petition goes on to state that cold hardiness is the prime determinant of which varietals can be successfully grown in the AVA. It has the lowest minimum temperature of all of the surrounding regions except for two locations to the north. Most vinifera varietals do poorly in climates with extreme cold winter temperatures, which can kill dormant vines, or late spring frosts, which can damage tender new vine growth. As a result, most vineyards in the AVA plant cold-hardy non-vinifera hybrids such as St. Croix, Traminette, Vidal, Cayuga, Frontanec, and Vignoles. By contrast, vineyards planted to the south of the AVA, within the warmer coastal region, plant more vinifera varietals including Cabernet Franc, Merlot, Riesling, and Chardonnay.

=== Soil ===
According to the petition, Connecticut was affected by the last Ice Age glacier, which covered all of the State with ice a mile or more thick. As the ice slowly flowed in a generally southerly direction, it scraped and eroded the underlying bedrock, which contains an abundance of mineral nutrients. Eroded debris deposited by glaciers is referred to as glacial till. Glacial till soils are generally fertile and well-suited for agriculture, including viticulture. There are two main types of glacial till—lodgement (or basal) till, which is material deposited by glaciers as they move across the landscape, and ablation (or meltout) till, which is material deposited as a stagnant or slow moving glacier melts. The soils of the Eastern Connecticut Highlands AVA developed on lodgement till. These soils are thick sandy to silty loams and can range from well to poorly drained and are typically less permeable than soils formed from ablation till. According to the petition, the AVA has the largest area of lodgement till soils in the State. By contrast, the Coastal Slope region of Connecticut, south of the AVA, has the smallest amount of lodgement till soils. The southern and western regions of the State contain large areas of ablation soils. Soils in the Central Valley west of the AVA formed in widespread glacial lake beds and are often poorly drained. The petition also provided information on the concentrations of seven elements found in the soils of the proposed AVA and the regions to the east, south, and west that play important roles in vine nutrition: Calcium, iron, magnesium, potassium, phosphorus, sulfur, and zinc. The petition states that when compared to the Central Valley, the proposed AVA has higher levels of calcium, iron, magnesium, and sulfur, and lower levels of potassium, phosphorus, and zinc. The petition states that these differences in soil chemistry are due to the very different chemical composition of the geological features underlying the Central Valley, which are formed primarily from sedimentary rocks and basalt. Compared to the regions to the east and south, the proposed AVA has similar levels of calcium, phosphorus, and sulfur, higher levels of iron, magnesium, and zinc, and lower levels of potassium. The petition states that there are fewer chemical differences between the soils of the proposed AVA and the regions to the east and south because similar metamorphic rocks compose the underlying geological features of all three of these regions. However, the proposed AVA does contain some soils derived from mafic rocks, which are igneous rocks that are very rich in iron and magnesium and contribute to the higher levels of those elements within the proposed AVA’s soils. The petition notes that calcium plays a role in a vine’s ability to uptake iron, and too much calcium can inhibit iron uptake. Iron is necessary for plants, including grapevines, to undertake chlorophyll synthesis, which allows for the production of nutrients needed for grapevine growth. Lack of iron may lead to chlorosis—an iron deficiency that may cause yellowing on grapevines and ultimately lead to grapevine death. Magnesium is involved with carbohydrate metabolism, and a lack of magnesium may also lead to chlorosis. Phosphorus is involved with energy transport in the vines, and a phosphorus deficiency can reduce grapevine growth and cause premature grape ripening. Potassium helps maintain fruit acidity by exchange with hydrogen ions, and a potassium deficiency can harm grapevines and cause grapes to unevenly ripen or fail to ripen. Higher levels of sulfur are generally known to increase soil acidity and provide grapevines with vitamins necessary for grapevine growth. Finally, the petition states the most common soil series of the AVA, the Central Valley to the west, and the Avalon Terrane to the south and east. The AVA shares some of the same soils as the regions to the south and east but contains none of the soils found in the region to the west. The petition states that the greater difference in soils series between the AVA and the Central Valley is due to the greater differences in the underlying geology. The AVA and the regions to the east and south have similar underlying geologic structures, but the slight chemical differences contribute to the slight differences in soil series.
