= Southeastern New England AVA =

Appellation that designates wine in Connecticut, Massachusetts, Rhode Island

Coordinates: 41°30′04″N 71°52′30″W

Southeastern New England
- Wine region
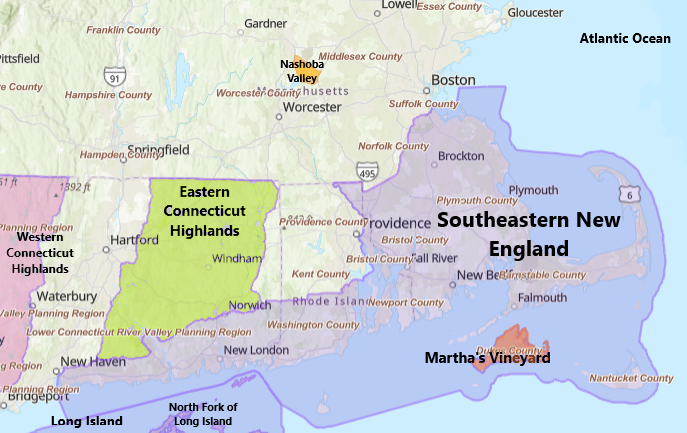
- Type: American Viticultural Area
- Year established: 1984
- Years of wine industry: 126
- Country: United States
- Part of: Connecticut, Massachusetts, Rhode Island
- Sub-regions: Martha's Vineyard AVA
- Growing season: 180–210 days
- Climate region: Region Ia
- Precipitation (annual average): 44 to 50 in (1,118–1,270 mm)
- Soil conditions: Moderately drained silt loam
- Total area: 1.88 million acres (2,930 sq mi)
- Size of planted vineyards: 200–300 acres (81–121 ha)
- No. of vineyards: 12
- Grapes produced: Albariño, Baco Noir, Cabernet Franc, Cabernet Sauvignon, Cayuga, Chancellor, Chardonnay, Diamond, Gewurztraminer, La Crescent, Lemberger, Marechal Foch, Marquette, Merlot, Muscat Ottonel, Petit Verdot, Pinot Blanc, Pinot gris, Pinot noir, Riesling, Rkatsiteli, Sauvignon blanc, Seyval blanc, St. Croix, Vidal blanc, Vignoles
- No. of wineries: 16

Southeastern New England is a vast American Viticultural Area (AVA) that encompasses thirteen counties in the three New England states of Connecticut, Massachusetts, and Rhode Island. The boundaries of the wine appellation expand across New Haven, New London, and Middlesex counties in Connecticut; Bristol, Newport, Providence, and Washington counties in Rhode Island; and Barnstable, Bristol, Dukes, Nantucket, Norfolk, and Plymouth counties in Massachusetts. The area stretches from the east coast just south of Boston, Massachusetts westward to New Haven, Connecticut, and includes all of the coastal plain and islands within 15 miles (24 km) of Long Island Sound, Cape Cod, and Massachusetts Bay. It was established as the nation's 62^{nd} and the initial AVA in each state on March 28, 1984 by the Bureau of Alcohol, Tobacco and Firearms (ATF), Treasury after reviewing the petition submitted by Mr. James Mitchell, of Sakonnet Vineyards, Little Compton, Rhode Island, on behalf of local winegrowers and vintners, proposing a viticultural area located on coastal Connecticut, Rhode Island and Massachusetts named "Southeastern New England."
All offshore islands between Boston and the Mystic River, including Martha's Vineyard and Nantucket, are included as part of the viticultural area. In response to this petition, ATF proposed the Southeastern New England viticultural area in Notice No. 477 on August 4, 1983 (48 FR 35462). In that notice, ATF solicited comments on alternative names or boundaries for the proposed viticultural area. Notice No. 477 also proposed the "Martha's Vineyard" viticultural area the subject of a separate Treasury decision.
The name "Southeastern New England" is descriptive of the land adjoining coastal bodies of water in eastern Connecticut, Rhode Island, and Massachusetts south of the Boston area. It has been used by the New England River Basins Commission to describe this portion of New England. No comments were addressed to the name and ATF ruled "Southeastern New England" as the name of the viticultural area.

Overall, the Southeastern New England viticultural area encompasses approximately 1.88 million acres (2,930 sq mi). At the outset, there were nine bonded wineries with others being established within the Southeastern New England viticultural area. It was estimated that there was between 200 and 300 acres (81–121 ha) of grapes with additional acreage planned in the near future. Vineyards are widely distributed and consist of both French Hybrid grapes and Vinifera grapes, especially Chardonnay, White Riesling, and Pinot Noir. The plant hardiness zone range is 6b-7b. Approval of the Southeastern New England viticultural area in no way affected the Martha's Vineyard viticultural area which was also proposed in Notice No. 477 and lies within the Southeastern New England AVA.

== History ==
Historically, most grapes grown throughout New England have been for table use rather than for the production of wine; however, local wineries produced wine from grapes grown along the New England coast for many years prior to Prohibition. For example, the Devil's Food Winery in Quonset Point, Rhode Island, grew 300 acres (120 ha) of grapes and sold wines as far away as Chicago from 1900 until the advent of Prohibition in 1919. Commercial grape growing along the southern New England coast resumed in the 1960s with plantings of French Hybrid grapes in Western Connecticut. The relatively mild climate of the viticultural area, and availability of modern technology has enabled both French Hybrids and Vinifera grapes to grow within the area. Also, the passage of farm winery laws by Connecticut, Rhode Island, and Massachusetts has encouraged the planting of vineyards and establishment of wineries. Since the early 1960s, more than 200 acres (81 ha) of wine grapes have been planted on 30 commercial vineyards, and more acreage is planned. Vineyards are distributed throughout the viticultural area with plantings in Stonington, Connecticut, surrounding Narragansett Bay and on the islands in the bay in Rhode Island, and in Plymouth, Norfolk, and Bristol Counties, Massachusetts, as well as on Martha's Vineyard and Nantucket Island. Varieties include Chardonnay, White Reisling, Pinot Noir, other Vinifera grapes, and French Hybrids.

== Terroir ==
=== Climate ===
Climate distinguishes the Southeastern New England viticultural area from surrounding areas located with a climate not unlike that of France's Burgundy region, with its sandy soil and mild, ocean-modulated climate warmed by Gulf Stream breezes. The area is part of that area shown on U.S. Weather Service climatic division maps as the coastal climatic divisions of Connecticut, Rhode Island, and Massachusetts. Climate within this area is moderated by its proximity to the Atlantic Ocean and various coastal bays including Block Island Sound, Narragansett Bay, Rhode Island Sound, Buzzards Bay, Cape Cod Bay, and Massachusetts Bay. The area is uniformly low Region I on the scale developed by Winkler and Amerine of the University of California to measure degree days. The growing season of 180 days is longer and more uniform than either adjacent New England or the recognized grape-growing regions of New York. The growing season in the Hudson River Region averages 153 days while nearby interior portions of New England average about 150 days. Precipitation in the Southeastern New England viticultural area averages 44 inches (1,118 mm) a year. The average daily temperature in January is 30 °F (−1 °C), and in July 70 °F (21 °C), and the mean daily range of temperature during the growing season is 20 °F (−7 °C) or less.

=== Soil ===
Vineyards near the ocean have sandy soil, but farther inland, the soil is mineral-rich glacial till, from glaciation that took place 10,000 years ago, composed of granite, flint, shale and basalt.

== Viticulture ==
The primary reason Southeastern New England produces quality wine is the Atlantic Ocean' thermal effect which holds warm air in summer and cool air in winter. The spring growing season begins slowly, as the cold ocean air flows inland after a long winter, thus delaying budbreak until after spring frosts. In autumn, the ocean releases the heat it gathered during the summer, prolonging the growing season into September and, in some areas, even October.
In the 2000s, the Coastal Wine Trail was developed by a group of 14 southeastern New England wineries with some established for decades. These older vineyards are rooted on 19th-century, or older, dairy or potato farms and are planted, in some measure, with the AVA's star varietal, Chardonnay. Though American native grapes are a different species from Vitis vinifera, the classic Mediterranean grape with more familiar varietals such as Cabernet, Pinot Noir, and Chardonnay, breeding programs at Cornell, the University of Minnesota, and other viticulture and enology schools have combined vinifera and native grapes to produce cold-tolerant North American hybrids such as La Crescent, Marquette, and Seyval. These can be sampled at some of the Coastal Wine Trail wineries, though there are still plenty of old-school Pinots and Rieslings to satisfy traditionalists.
