= Western Connecticut Highlands AVA =

American Viticultural Area in Connecticut

Coordinates: 41°49′18″N 73°13′09″W

Western Connecticut Highlands
- Wine region
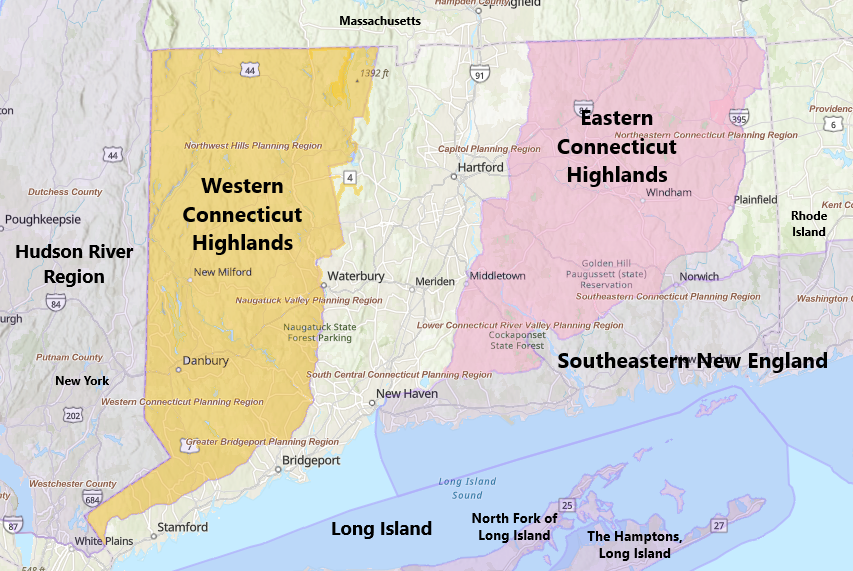
- Connecticut AVAs
- Type: American Viticultural Area
- Year established: 1988
- Years of wine industry: 107
- Country: United States
- Part of: Connecticut
- Other regions in Connecticut: Southeastern New England AVA, Eastern Connecticut Highlands AVA
- Growing season: 180–210 days
- Climate region: Region II
- Heat units: 2,610,5 GDD units
- Precipitation (annual average): 42 to 52 in (1,100–1,300 mm) snow: 35 to 100 in (89–254 cm)
- Soil conditions: Glacial till derived from gneiss, schist and granite
- Total area: 1.0 million acres (1,570 sq mi)
- Size of planted vineyards: 114.75 acres (46.44 ha)
- No. of vineyards: 6
- Grapes produced: Aurora, Cabernet Franc, Cayuga, Chambourcin, Chardonnay, Foch, Léon Millot, Merlot, Pinot Noir, Seyval Blanc and Vidal Blanc
- No. of wineries: 7

Western Connecticut Highlands is an American Viticultural Area (AVA) that encompasses all of Litchfield and parts of Fairfield, New Haven, and Hartford counties in western Connecticut. It was established as the state's second AVA on February 9, 1988 by the Bureau of Alcohol, Tobacco and Firearms (ATF), Treasury after reviewing the petition submitted by Mr. and Mrs. William Hopkins of Hopkins Vineyard, New Preston, Connecticut, on behalf of local winegrowers and vintners, proposing a viticultural area encompassing the western highlands area known as "Western Connecticut Highlands."

The Connecticut Highlands area is far enough away from Long Island Sound that there is little of the moderating effect on climate that large bodies of water produce. The region is relatively cool, with a short growing season between mid-May and mid-September. The soil in the area is glacial schist and gneiss. Local vintners have had the most success with cool climate Vitis vinifera and French hybrid grape varieties. At the outset, there were four wineries, with others being established within the approximately 1,570 square miles (1,004,800.00 acres) Western Connecticut Highlands viticultural area. In addition, there were six grape growers. The region is located in a hardiness zone range from 5b to 7a.

== History ==
Early settlers to Connecticut found native grape varieties growing on the land, but a lack of viticultural expertise and access to European wines meant that they had little inclination to make their own until the mid-19th century. Commercial grape growing along the southern New England coast resumed in the 1960s with plantings of French Hybrid grapes in Western Connecticut. It wasn't until 1978 that the state's wine industry began to pick up, after the Farm Winery Act was passed, allowing wineries to sell wine commercially. Also, passage of farm winery laws in adjacent states of Rhode Island and Massachusetts further encouraged the planting of vineyards and establishment of wineries in the New England region. Now, roughly half of Connecticut's wineries are located within the Western Connecticut Highlands AVA, with the remainder being focused in the state's south-eastern corner, in the coastal Southeastern New England AVA. The relatively mild climate of the viticultural area, and availability of modern technology has enabled both French Hybrids and Vinifera grapes to grow within the area.

== Terroir ==
=== Topography ===
The State of Connecticut can be divided into four physiographic zones: (1) The Coastal Lowlands or Coastal Plain (Long Island Sound influence), (2) the Central Lowlands or Central Valley (Connecticut River influence), (3] the Western Highlands and (4) the Eastern Highlands. The Coastal Lowlands and Central Valley have elevations ranging from sea level to less than 500 feet (150 m). The long broad Central Valley actually begins far to the north in New Hampshire, Vermont and Massachusetts. The Western and Eastern Highlands are somewhat similar in climate and other features but are geographically separated by the Central Valley. There are some bonded wineries and grape growers in the Eastern Highlands. There are no bonded wineries located in the Central Valley. The Western Highlands are an extension of the Green Mountain and Taconic Ranges to the north in Massachusetts with the general elevation in the viticultural area varying from 200 to 1,500 feet (61–457 m) above sea level. The Western Highlands are generally more rugged than the corresponding Eastern Highlands which have altitudes varying from 200 to 1,000 feet (61–305 m) above sea level. Many of the vineyards sit on low, rolling hills that face south-west, taking advantage of the summer sun for ripening. The air drainage in these vineyards is better than on flatter land, decreasing the risks of frost damage and generally improving drainage during rain events.

=== Climate ===
Snowfall is heavier in the Western Connecticut Highlands than anywhere else in the state, and ranges from 35 to 100 inches annually. Long-term records indicate that there is considerable variation in seasonal amounts of snowfall in the viticultural area; in one location more than 130 inches fell in one year, during another year at the same location only 37 inches fell. Snowfall varies throughout the State; lighter along the Coastal Lowlands and heavier in the northwest portion of the viticultural area. The northwestern portion of the viticultural area receives about 100 inches of snow annually.
At the Coastal Lowlands the average annual rainfall is lower than in the Western Highlands. The Eastern and Western Highlands have mean annual temperatures of 47 'F and 46 *F, respectively. The mean annual temperature for the Coastal Lowlands is 50 *F and the Central Valley is 49 °F (9 °C). Because of their relatively low elevation the Coastal Lowlands and Central Valley have warmer climates than the viticultural area. The climate of the Coastal Lowlands and to some extent the climate of the Central Valley are also greatly influenced by the moderating effect of the Long Island Sound. The winters in Connecticut are not as long, or as severe, as they are in the northern New England states. In the fall, freezing temperatures throughout the Connecticut regions usually begin about the middle of November, and end by the last week in March along the Coastal Lowlands and early in April in the Western and Eastern Highlands. The area to the west of the viticultural area is the Hudson River Region, a complex distinct geological region characterized by the Hudson River Valley and surrounding hills. This area has been a grape-growing region for over 300 years. In 1982, the Hudson River Region AVA was established encompassing approximately 3,500 square miles (2,200,000 acres). Immediately north of the Western Connecticut Highlands viticultural area is the Berkshire Mountain region of Massachusetts and further north is the Green Mountain Range. The Berkshire Mountain region is similar in broad physiography to the viticultural area. However, it is further north than the Western Connecticut Highlands with a slightly cooler climate. The elevation is higher in the Green Mountain Range which is further into the northern interior, resulting in a more rugged terrain, colder average temperatures, and a shorter growing season than the viticultural area and the Berkshire Mountain Range. Connecticut's southern boundary is formed by 253 miles (407 km) of irregular shoreline on the Long Island Sound. Along this shore stretches a narrow strip of fairly level land designated as the Coastal Lowlands. The coastline is characterized by alternating limited sections of sandy beach, rocky bluffs, and salt water marshes, indented with numerous small coves and inlets. This area is greatly influenced by the moderating temperatures of the Long Island Sound.

=== Soil ===
The soils within the Western Connecticut Highlands viticultural area are predominantly formed in glacial till derived from gneiss, schist and granite. The Hollis-Charlton, Paxton-Woodbridge, Charlton-Hollis, and Stockbridge-Farmington-Amenia soils are the most commonly found soil series of the Western Connecticut Highlands. The Eastern Highlands also have the same soils except that the Stockbridge-Farmington-Amenia soils are only found in the Western Connecticut Highlands. The north–south strip of lowland bisected by the Connecticut River comprises the Central Valley, which extends northerly from the Long Island Sound into Massachusetts. Although broken with occasional traprock ridges, most of the land is gently sloping with productive agricultural soils. The Central Valley is dominated by soils formed in glacial till derived from sandstone, shale, conglomerate and basalt. The Wethersfield-Holyoke-Broadbrook, Penwood-Manchester, Windsor-Ninigret-Merrimac, Elmwood-Buxton-Scantic, and Hadley-Winooski soils are the most commonly found soil series of the Central Valley. These soil series are not found in the Western or Eastern Highlands.
