= Bartlett Maine Estate Winery =

Coordinates: 44°29′27″N 68°00′55″W

Bartlett Maine Estate Winery in Gouldsboro, Maine, is the state's oldest winery. It was established in 1983, by Bob Bartlett.

The winery is known for producing fruit wines, especially wines based on pears, apples, raspberries and wild blueberries, staple crops in Maine. It was one of the first producers of dry fruit wines, with most traditional fruit wines being sweet. In 1996, the Bartlett Maine Estate's blueberry wine was named as one of Wine Enthusiast magazine's "Top 40 red wines in the world". Down East Magazine described the winery's pear wine as "medium-bodied with a mineral quality reminiscent of a good Chablis".

== See also ==
- List of wineries in New England
