= Martha's Vineyard AVA =

Appellation that designates wine in Massachusetts

Coordinates: 41°22′27″N 70°40′42″W

Martha's Vineyard
- Wine region
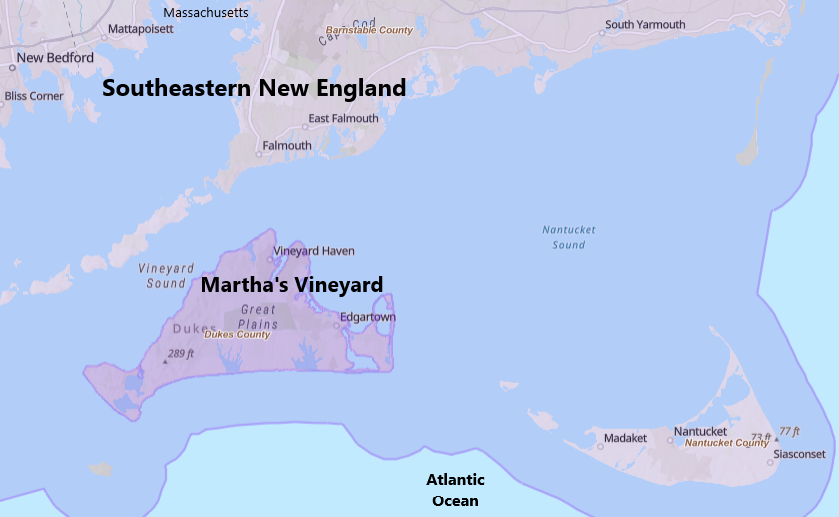
- Type: American Viticultural Area
- Year established: 1985
- Country: United States
- Part of: Massachusetts, Southeastern New England AVA
- Growing season: 210 days
- Climate region: Region Ib
- Heat units: 2,450 GDD units
- Precipitation (annual average): 44 inches (1,118 mm)
- Soil conditions: well drained sand and sandy loam
- Total area: 64,000 acres (100 sq mi)
- Size of planted vineyards: 50 acres (20 ha)
- Grapes produced: Cabernet Sauvignon, Chardonnay, Gewurztraminer, Merlot, Pinot Noir, White Riesling

Martha's Vineyard is an American Viticultural Area (AVA) located in Dukes County, Massachusetts, including all of the land on the islands named Martha's Vineyard and Chappaquiddick Island. These two islands are located off the southern Massachusetts coast, surrounded by Vineyard Sound, Nantucket Sound, and the Atlantic Ocean. It was established as the nation's 74^{th} and the state's second appellation on January 3, 1985 by the Bureau of Alcohol, Tobacco and Firearms (ATF), Treasury after reviewing the petition submitted by Mr. George Mathiesen, co-owner of Chicama Vineyards, West Tisbury, Massachusetts, on behalf of themselves, proposing a viticultural area known as "Martha's Vineyard."
The 1983 AVA proposal was controversial receiving objections during public comments period from the proprietors of a well established and renown Napa Valley vineyard also named "Martha's Vineyard" claiming the creation of an AVA with the same name would dilute their brand value. The island was named in 1602 and has been known by no other name at least since 1640. Although the "Martha" for whom the island was named remains a mystery, the vineyard referred to the proliferation of native American grape vines which grow on the island. Federal regulators ruled in favor of the AVA, citing historical evidence that viticulture has been practiced on the Massachusetts island named Martha's Vineyard since at least 1602.
The maritime location helps to create a slightly warmer climate than the nearby coastal regions of Massachusetts, and a growing season that is almost three weeks longer. The first Martha's Vineyard wines, Chardonnay and White Riesling, were produced in 1974 and sold in 1975. At the outset, there were 50 acres (20 ha) of bearing commercial vineyards on Martha's Vineyard. All grapes grown commercially were Vinifera varieties, primarily Chardonnay, White Riesling, Gewurztraminer, Cabernet, Pinot Noir, and Merlot. In 2008, the island's sole vineyard and winery, Chicama Vineyards, closed its doors and the new owners converted the property to raise horses. As of 2025, there is no resident commercial vineyard or winery on the island.

== Name Controversy ==
Martha's Vineyard in Massachusetts demonstrates clear historical precedent for the name. The island was named in 1602 and has been known by no other name at least since 1640. There is no evidence to show the name "Martha's Vineyard" does not apply to the island in Massachusetts. However, there were written comments objecting to the "Martha's Vineyard" appellation application during the public comments period during the AVA proposal.
Thomas May purchased a vineyard in Napa Valley in 1963 and named it "Martha's Vineyard" in honor of his wife. In the 1980s, this vineyard was 40 acres (16 ha) and produced Cabernet Sauvignon grapes which were sold to Heitz Wine Cellars of St. Helena, California. Heitz produced and bottled Cabernet Sauvignon wine from these grapes and labeled it "Napa Valley" with the additional vineyard designation "Martha's Vineyard." According to the written comments, this wine is of exceptional quality and is generally known as, and referred to as Heitz "Martha's Vineyard" Cabernet Sauvignon. Heitz stated their "Martha's Vineyard" label is well known nationally and internationally. Mr. Thomas May, vineyard owner, and Heitz Wine Cellars argued against the establishment of a Martha's Vineyard viticultural area in Massachusetts for the following reasons:

1. It would violate Heitz common law right as an owner of the trademark and trade name "Martha's Vineyard."
2. Establishment of the viticultural area would deprive Heitz, as a trade name owner, to use its established trade name "Martha's Vineyard."
3. Establishment of the viticultural area-would unfairly deprive Heitz of the goodwill and reputation built on the name "Martha's Vineyard," and this would result in serious economic detriment.
4. Establishment of the viticultural area would be deceptive and misleading to consumers who are familiar with "Martha's Vineyard" wine produced by Heitz.

As a result of these arguments, Heitz requested that ATF not establish a viticultural area known as "Martha's Vineyard." As an alternative, Heitz suggested the viticultural area could be established using some other name. This position was supported by several Napa Valley wineries in their comments, as well as by Bob Thompson, a wine consumer. Thompson stated that allowing another region to use the appellation "Martha's Vineyard" would dilute consumer understanding of the "Martha's Vineyard" wine produced by Heitz. He further stated that there is little evidence that the area in Massachusetts has any history of being viticulturally significant, and that it is premature to allow such a designation.

ATF examined all of the written comments regarding the name "Martha's Vineyard," as well as Treasury Decision ATF-53 which established the present appellation of origin system. Several conclusions are evident concerning the name. ATF concluded that the name "Martha's Vineyard" satisfies the criteria requiring evidence that the name of the viticultural area be locally and/or nationally known as referring to the area specified in the application. Treasury Decision ATF-53 did not recognize vineyard designations as appellations of origin; thus, Heitz "Martha's Vineyard" qualifies only as additional information permitted on labels. As additional information, "Martha's Vineyard" may continue to appear on labels for wine derived from grapes grown in a bonafide vineyard known by that name. However, "Martha's Vineyard" is not the appellation of origin on such wine labels and may not be used in lieu of an appellation when an appellation of origin is required. Only appellations of origin meeting the requirements of 27 CFR.4.25a may be used when appellations of origin are required to appear on wine labels. ATF does not believe authorization of "Martha's Vineyard" as a viticultural area will result in consumer confusion or deception. Heitz "Martha's Vineyard" label is currently well known as referring to a single vineyard; moreover, all bottles using this label show an appellation of origin "Napa Valley" as authorized by 27 CFR 4.25a. Wine originating from the island of Martha's Vineyard may bear "Martha's Vineyard" as an appellation of origin. ATF believes that consumers are unlikely to be confused between wines bearing labels of "Napa Valley" and "Martha's Vineyard" as appellations of origin due to their wide geographic separation. For the same reason, ATF will not prohibit Heitz Wine Cellars from continuing to use "Martha's Vineyard" as a vineyard designation on their labels in conjunction with an appellation of origin.

== History ==
Prior to the entry of Europeans, the island was called "Cappwadck" or "Noe-pe" by its Indian inhabitants. The well-known name "Martha's Vineyard" was given to the island in 1602 by Bartholomew Gosnold, an agent for Sir Walter Raleigh. Although the identity of "Martha" is a bone of contention among island historians, the "vineyard" referred to the proliferation of native American grape vines on the island. In succeeding years, the island was referred to as Martha's or Martin's Vineyard. By 1640 after the first permanent settlement on the island, it was firmly established as "Martha's Vineyard." Today, Martha's Vineyard is a well known resort area, and all references to the island are to Martha's Vineyard.
Viticulture on the island was recorded in the journal of two members of the original party which landed on Martha's Vineyard in 1602 described the island as "An incredible store of vines, as well as in the Woodie part of the island, where they run upon every tree, as upon the outward parts that we could not goe for treading upon them." Although the island abundantly grows native American grapes, the fruit was not cultivated until 1971 when George and Catherine Mathiesen purchased in West Tisbury, a piece of land with sandy soil and an unpredictable climate. The couple obtained 20 years worth of weather records from Vineyard Gazette editor Henry Beetle Hough, planted six acres (2.4 ha) with grapes and three years later harvested their first crop. The first Martha's Vineyard wines, Chardonnay and White Riesling, were produced in 1974 and sold in 1975. Later they expanded their vineyard to 33 acres (13 ha) and bonded Chicama Vineyards. At the outset, there were 46 acres (19 ha) of bearing commercial vineyards on Martha's Vineyard. All grapes grown commercially were Vinifera varieties, primarily Chardonnay, White Riesling, Gewurztraminer, Cabernet, Pinot Noir, and Merlot. The Mathiesen family operated Chicama Vineyards for decades even after George and Catherine's passing. However, on August 10, 2008, Chicama Vineyards shuttered its doors as the Mathiesens sold the winery and vineyard to new owners who converted the property to raise horses.

== Terroir ==
=== Topography ===
Martha's Vineyard is an island surrounded on the north by Vineyard Sound, on the east by Nantucket Sound, and on the south and west by the Atlantic Ocean. The greatest length of the island from east to west is 19 miles (31 km), and greatest width about 9.5 miles (15 km). Total size of Martha's Vineyard is approximately 100 square miles (64,000 acres).

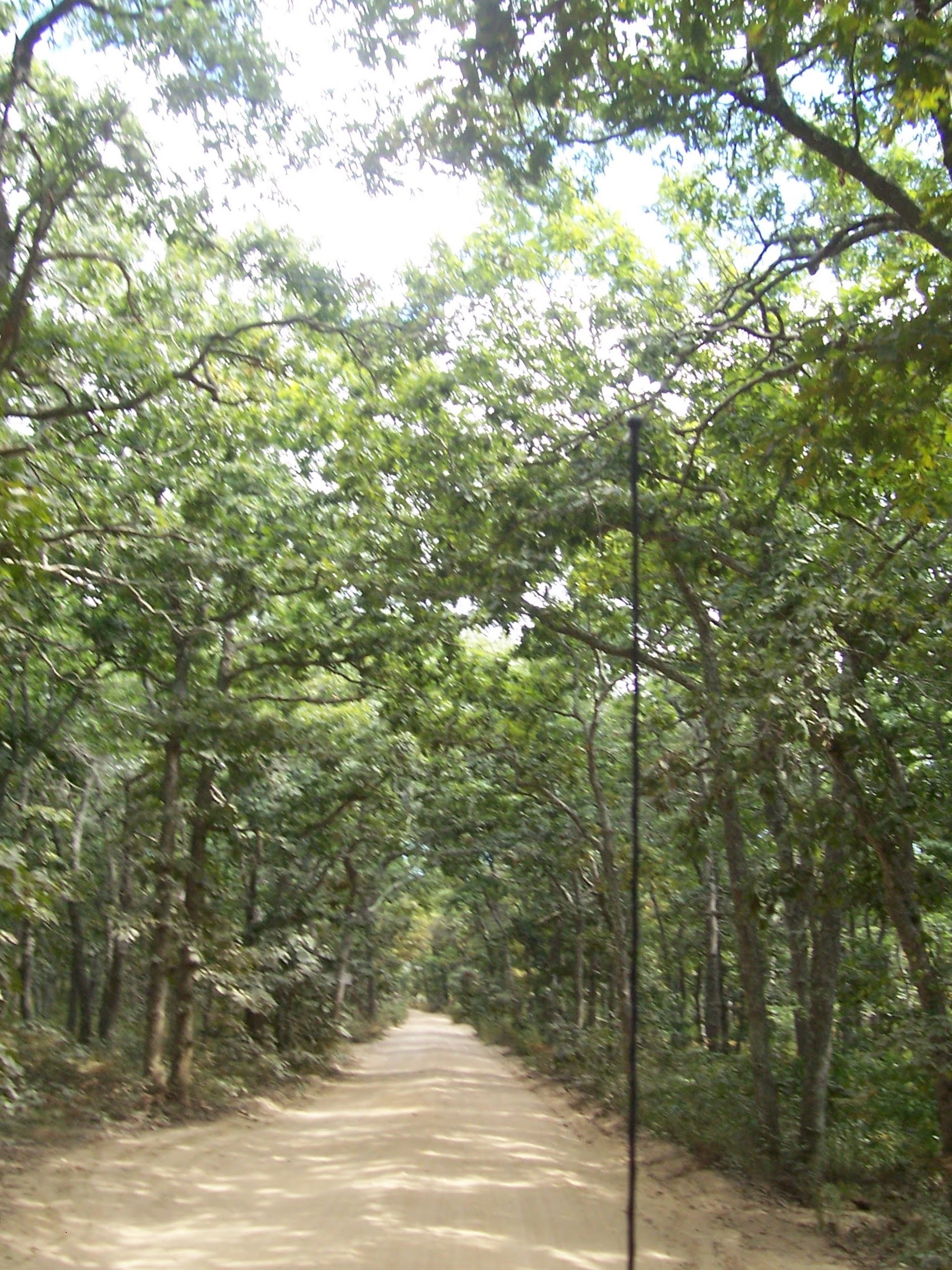

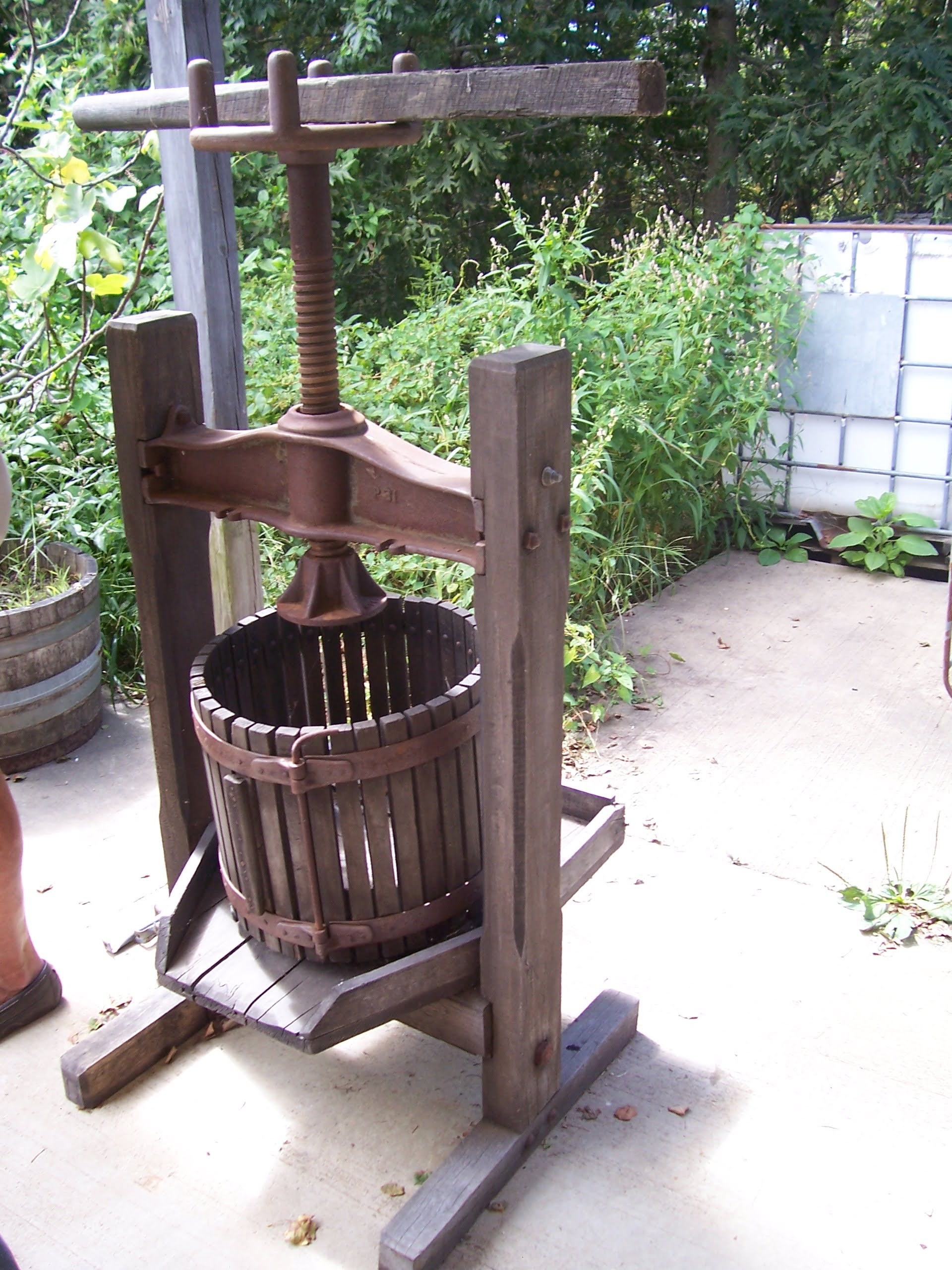

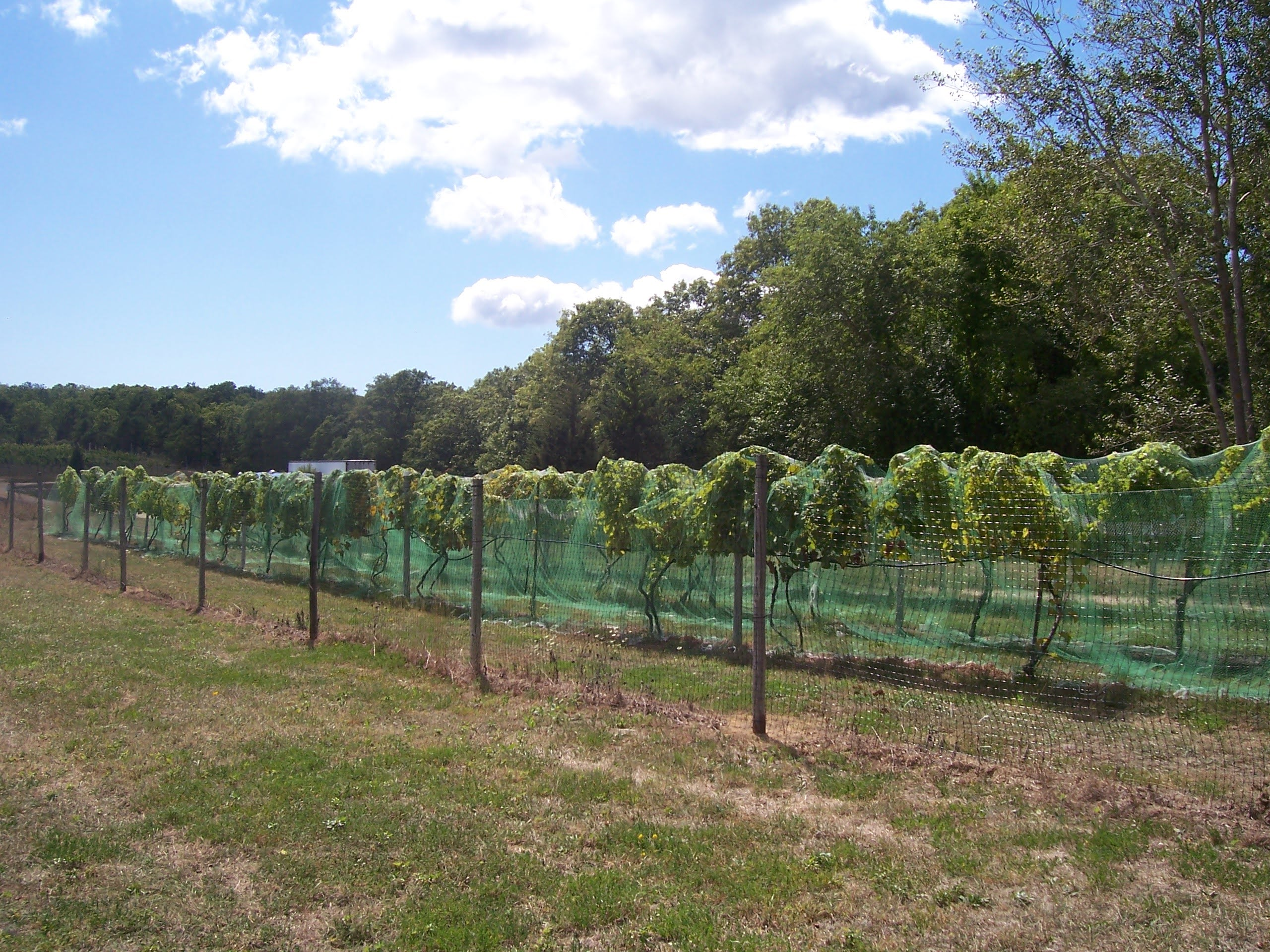

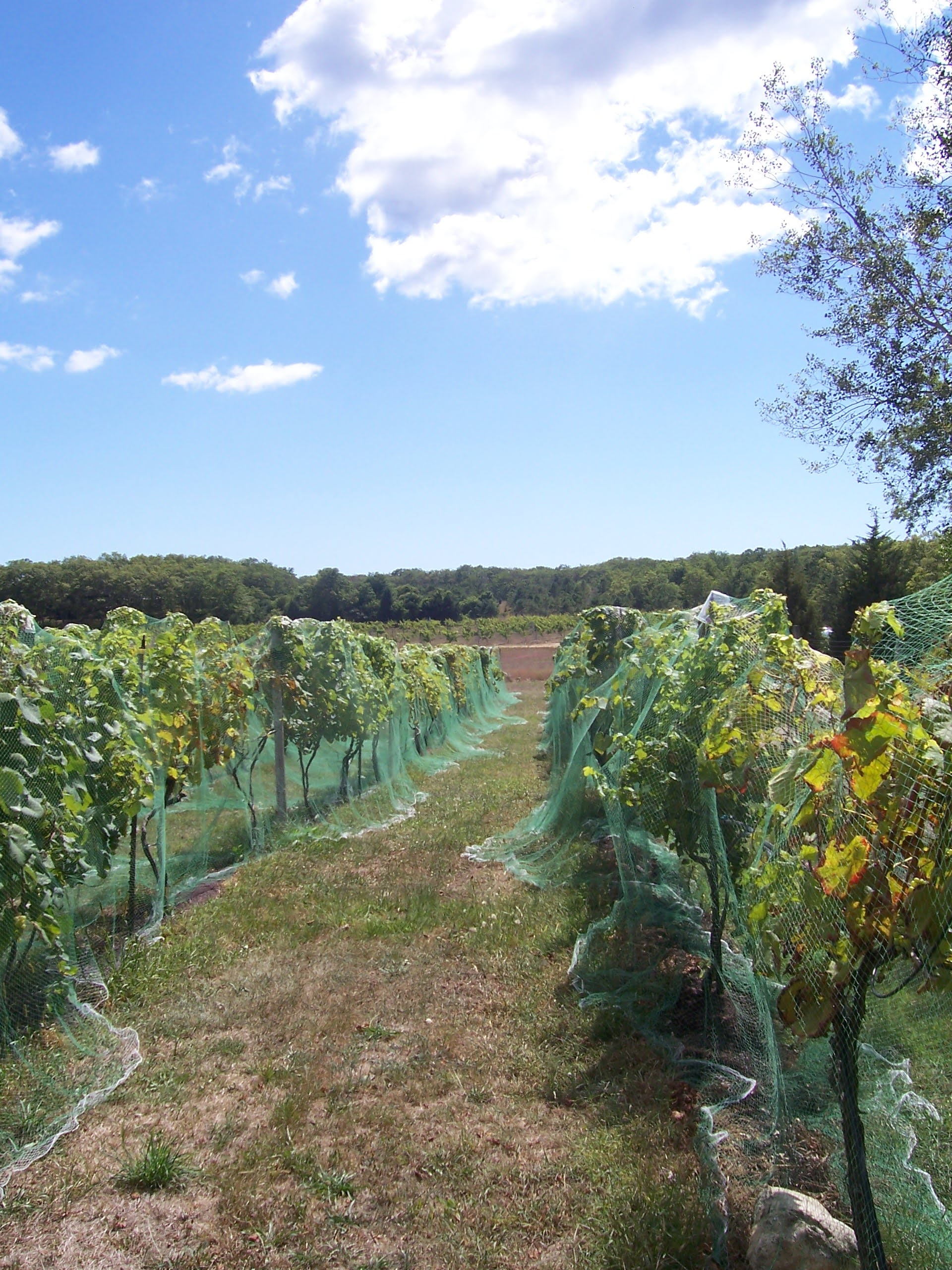

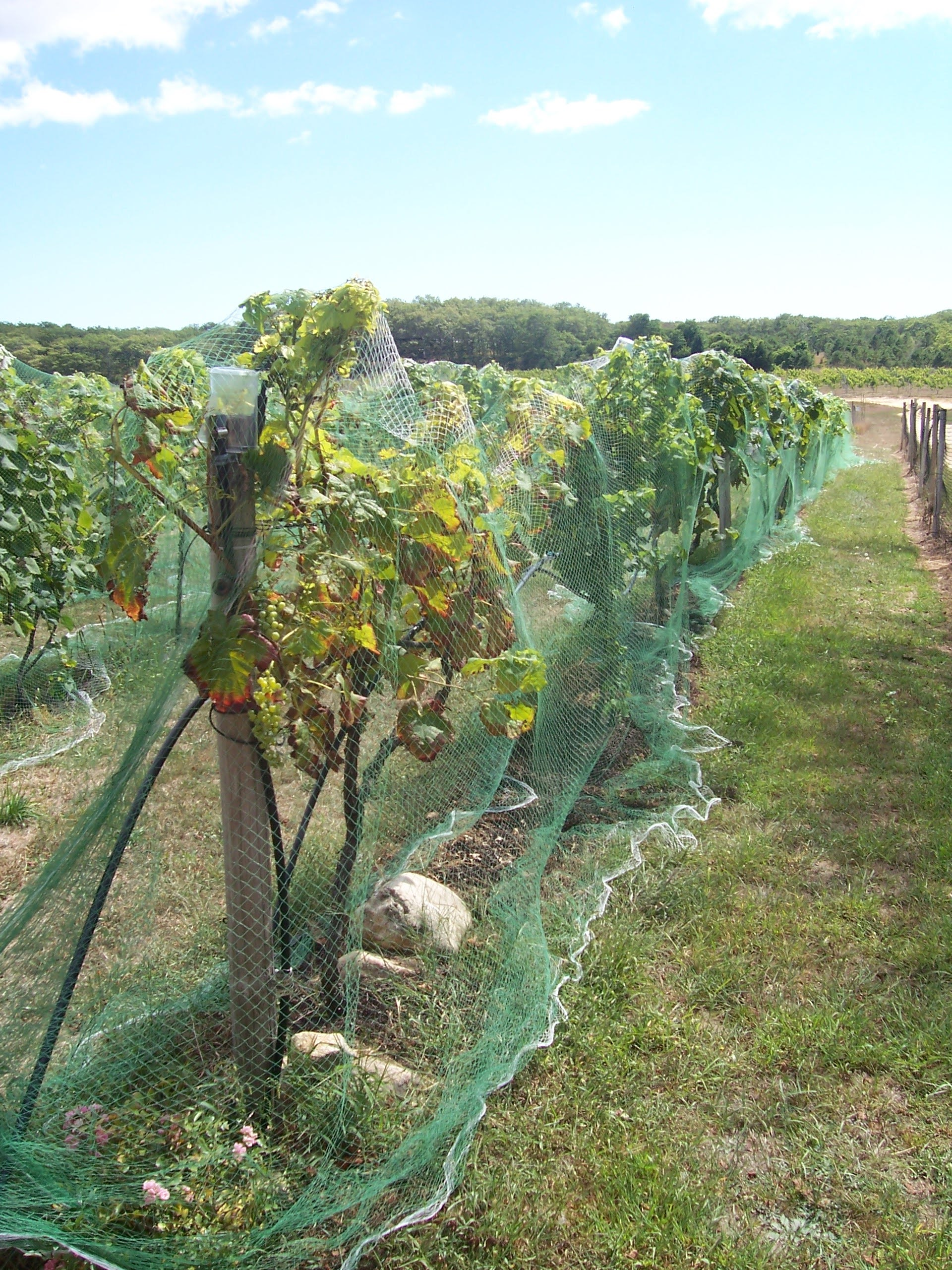

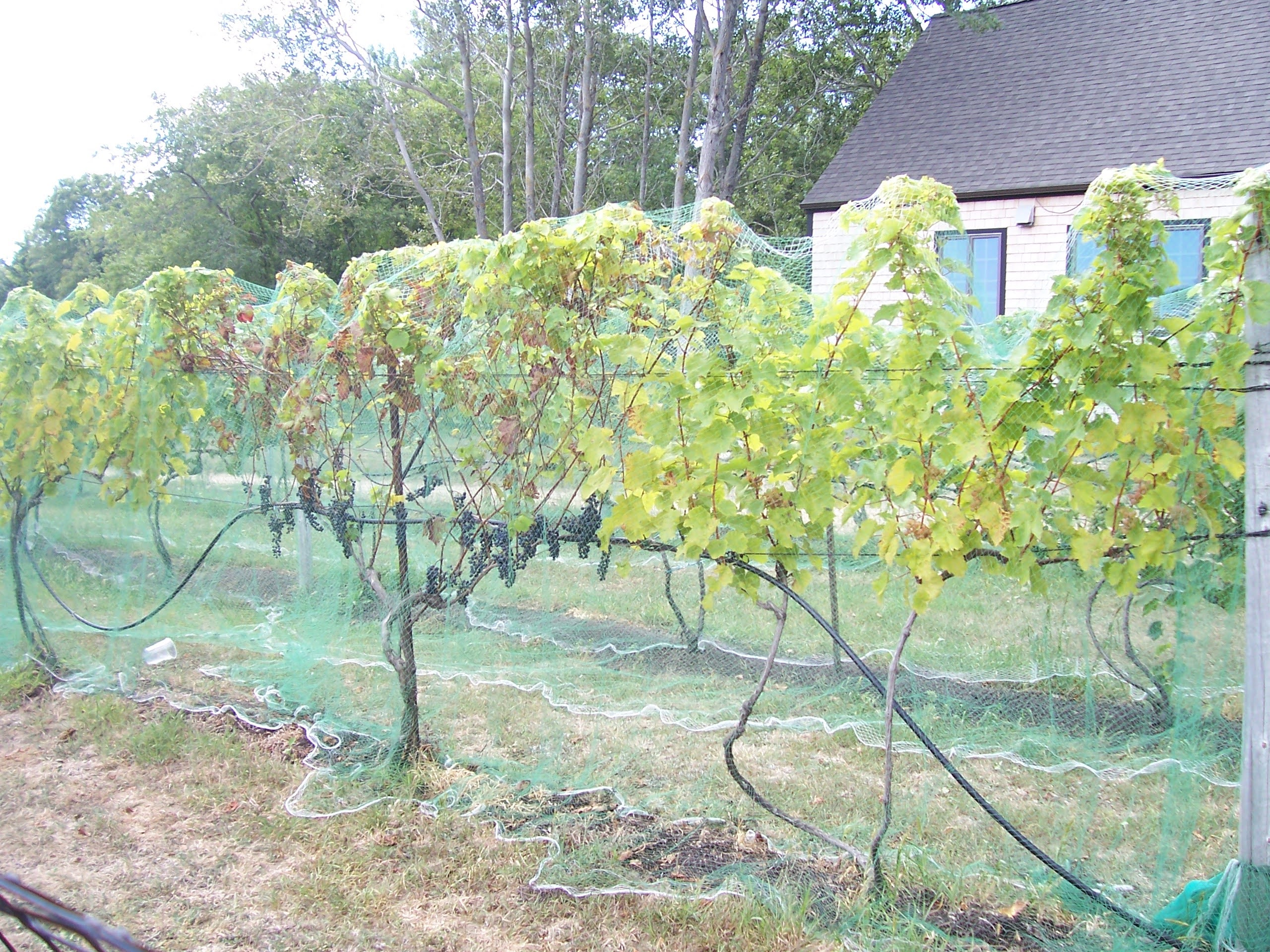

=== Climate ===
Although Martha's Vineyard is a part of the Southeastern New England viticultural area, its climate is milder, being more strongly influenced by surrounding waters than coastal New England. As an island, Martha's Vineyard is influenced by coastal winds blowing from all directions, unlike the New England coast which is influenced by ocean winds blowing from the south. These coastal winds moderate the climate of Martha's Vineyard. In the spring, winds travel over cool ocean waters causing a late island spring but protecting grapes from spring frost. In the fall, ocean winds influenced by warm water prolong the growing season. Consequently, the Martha's Vineyard growing season averages 210 days as compared to 180 days on the New England coast. Summer winds also keep grape vines dry preventing rot and mildew. In winter, snowfall is significantly less and rainfall greater than that of coastal New England. Martha's Vineyard may be classified as a high Region I with an average of 2450 degree days. Other parts of the Southeastern New England viticultural area average low Region I, and winters tend to be colder and summers warmer on the New England coast than on Martha's Vineyard. These temperature differences stem from the moderating ocean influences around Martha's Vineyard. The hardiness zone is 7a.

=== Soil ===
Geologically, Martha's Vineyard was formed by a glacial moraine. Soils are deep, well drained sand and sandy loam, some of which are in the rocky phase.
