= USS Block Island =

Three ships of the United States Navy have been named Block Island, after Block Island Sound.

- USS Block Island (CVE-8), was transferred to the United Kingdom under Lend-Lease on 9 January 1943 and commissioned the following day as HMS Hunter (D80).
- USS Block Island (CVE-21), went into service in March 1943, and was sunk in May 1944.
- USS Block Island (CVE-106), was commissioned in December 1944 and active in the closing months of the Pacific War, and periodically in use until 1954.
