= Huglin index =

Bioclimatic heat index for vineyards

Pierre Huglin developed a bioclimatic heat index for vineyards, the Huglin heat sum index (or after Huglin respectively -warmth index or short Huglin index,) in which the temperature sum over the temperature threshold of 10 °C is calculated and then summed for all days from beginning of April to end of September. The calculation uses both the daily average temperatures and the maximum temperatures and slightly modifies the calculated total according to latitude. Each grape variety needs a certain amount of heat in order to be cultivated successfully in the long term in a given area. The calculated heat sums, which are based on data from weather stations or from climate models, differ in that they are too low compared to the actual values in the vineyards. The index does not take into account e.g. thermally favoured hillsides where temperature values may be higher by about 1.5 °C to 2 °C.

== Definition & Calculation ==
The Huglin index is calculated as a product of the coefficient K and the sum of the arithmetic mean of daily mean- and daily maximum temperatures relative to the baseline temperature of 10 °C (taking into account all days from 1 April till 30 September):

$H = HI = K \cdot \sum\limits_{01.04.}^{30.09.} \left(\frac{T_{\mathrm{mean}} + T_{\mathrm{max}}}{2} - 10\right) = K \cdot \sum\limits_{01.04.}^{30.09.} \frac{\left(T_{\mathrm{mean}} - 10\right) + \left(T_{\mathrm{max}} - 10\right)}{2} = K \cdot \sum\limits_{01.04.}^{30.09.} \frac{T_{\mathrm{mean}} + T_{\mathrm{max}} - 20}{2}$

T_{mean} = daily mean temperature
T_{max} = daily maximum temperature
baseline temperature = 10 °C
K = parameter dependent on the latitude of the location; the sum is multiplied by a factor K depending on the latitude of the location, taking into account the length of the day in northern latitudes; for example:

K (40°) = 1.02
K (50°) = 1.06

== Heat sum index according to Huglin (1986) for different grape varieties ==
| Huglin-Index H | Grape Variety |
|---|---|
| H < 1500 | |
| 1500 ≤ H < 1600 | Müller-Thurgau, Blauer Portugieser |
| 1600 ≤ H < 1700 | Pinot blanc, Grauer Burgunder, Aligoté, Gamay noir, Gewürztraminer |
| 1700 ≤ H < 1800 | Riesling, Chardonnay, Silvaner, Sauvignon blanc, Pinot noir, Grüner Veltliner |
| 1800 ≤ H < 1900 | Cabernet Franc |
| 1900 ≤ H < 2000 | Chenin blanc, Cabernet Sauvignon, Merlot, Sémillon, Welschriesling |
| 2000 ≤ H < 2100 | Ugni blanc |
| 2100 ≤ H < 2200 | Grenache, Syrah, Cinsaut |
| 2200 ≤ H < 2300 | Carignan |
| 2300 ≤ H < 2400 | Aramon |

== Consequences of changes in the Huglin index ==
Due to climate change, the Huglin index will continue to rise over coming decades, and the suitability of an area for a specific grape variety will continue to change.

With increases in the heat sum, the variety of vines in the northern growing areas of Europe has already changed. Varieties that used to be cultivated only in wine-growing regions in the south have already gained a certain amount of significance in cultivation in Austria and Germany.

The varieties Cabernet Franc, Cabernet Sauvignon, Merlot and Syrah are already being successfully planted and cultivated in warmer regions of Austria. They were included in the quality wine assortment.

== Literature ==
- Pierre Huglin: Biologie et écologie de la vigne. Lavoisier (Edition Tec & Doc), Paris 1986, ISBN 2-60103-019-4. S. 292 (371 S.).
- Pierre Huglin: Nouveau mode d’évaluation des possibilités héliothermique d’un milieu viti-cole. C. R. Académie d’Agriculture (Acad. Agric.), 1117–1126, 1978.
- Dieter Hoppmann: Terroir, Wetter – Klima – Boden, Verlag Ulmer KG, Stuttgart 2010, ISBN 978-3-8001-5317-6, S. 28.
- Daniela Dejnega: Weinbau in ganz Österreich?, Der Winzer 6/2013, S 23-25, Österreichischer Agrarverlag, Wien.

== See also ==
- Effects of climate change on wine production
- Viticulture
- Winkler index
