= List of wineries in New England =

Here is a list of wineries and vineyards in New England. New England wines are known for their diverse styles and for the effects of maritime climates on grape-growing. Wine making in New England today has been described by New Hampshire winemaker Bob Manley as "a little reminiscent of what it was like in California – actually, even in Napa – in the '50s and '60s." Historian Samuel Eliot Morison uses the metaphor of wine to describe the relationship between present New England culture and its past:

The wine of New England is not a series of successive vintages, each distinct from the other, like the wines of France; it is more like the mother-wine in those great casks of port and sherry that one sees in the bodegas of Portugal and Spain, from which a certain amount is drawn off every year, and replaced by an equal volume of the new. Thus the change is gradual and the mother wine of 1656 still gives bouquet and flavor to what is drawn in 1956.

Inclusion criteria: This list should only include wineries with Wikipedia articles or citations to third-party sources.

== Connecticut ==
This is a list of wineries and vineyards in Connecticut.

- Chamard Vineyards
- Haight-Brown (1975) - first winery in Connecticut
- Hopkins Vineyard
- Jonathan Edwards Winery
- Jones Family Farms Winery
- Maugle Sierra Vineyards
- Sharpe Hill Vineyard

== Maine ==
This is a list of wineries and vineyards in Maine.

- Anthony Lee's Winery, Dexter
- Bar Harbor Cellars, Bar Harbor
- Bartlett Maine Estate Winery, Gouldsboro - Maine's oldest winery
- Catherine Hill Winery, Cherryfield
- Cellardoor Winery & Vineyards, Lincolnville
- Dragonfly Winery, Stetson
- Hidden Spring Winery, Hodgdon
- Oyster River Winegrowers, Warren - 2021 pick for Down East's "Best of Maine"
- Prospect Hill Winery, Lebanon
- Savage Oakes Vineyard And Winery, Union
- Shalom Orchard & Winery, Franklin
- Stone Tree Farm & Cidery, Unity
- Sweetgrass Farm Winery & Distillery, Union
- Tree Spirits Winery, Oakland
- WillowsAwake Winery, Leeds
- Winterport Winery, Winterport

== Massachusetts ==
This is a list of wineries and vineyards in Massachusetts.

- Alfalfa Farm
- Balderdash Cellars
- Black Birch Vineyard
- Boston Winery
- Cameron's Winery
- Cape Cod Winery
- Echo Hill Orchards and Winery
- Furnace Brook Winery at Hilltop Orchard
- Hardwick Winery
- Les Trois Emme
- Mineral Hills Winery
- Nashoba Valley Winery (1978) in Bolton - state's first winery.
- Plymouth Bay Winery
- Running Brook Winery
- Russell Orchards
- Truro Vineyards

== New Hampshire ==
This is a list of wineries and vineyards in New Hampshire.

- Flag Hill Winery, Lee
- Jewell Towne Vineyards, South Hampton
- Seven Birches Winery, Lincoln

== Rhode Island ==
This is a list of wineries and vineyards in Rhode Island.

- Anchor & Hope Winery
- Carolyn's Sakonnet Vineyards (1975), Little Compton - state's first winery
- Diamond Hill Vineyards
- Gooseneck Vineyard
- Greenvale Vineyards
- Langworthy Farm Winery
- Leyden Farm Vineyard 7 Winery
- Mulberry Vineyards
- Newport Vineyards
- Nickle Creek Vineyard
- Shepherd’s Run
- Tapped Apple Cidery & Winery
- Verde Vineyards
- WinterHawk Vineyard

== Vermont ==
This is a list of wineries and vineyards in Vermont.

- Putney Mountain Winery – Putney
- Shelburne Vineyard – Shelburne
- Snow Farm Vineyard and Distillery – South Hero
- Domaine des Cotes d'Ardoise - Dunham
- Domaine du Ridge - Franklin County
- Lincoln Peak Vineyard - Addison County

== See also ==
- American wine
