= Subglacial =

Subglacial means "formed, or occurring beneath a glacier or other body of ice". It may refer to:

- Subglacial eruption
- Subglacial lake
- Subglacial stream
- Subglacial volcano
