= Nashoba Valley Ski Area =

Ski area in Westford, Massachusetts

Nashoba Ski Resort
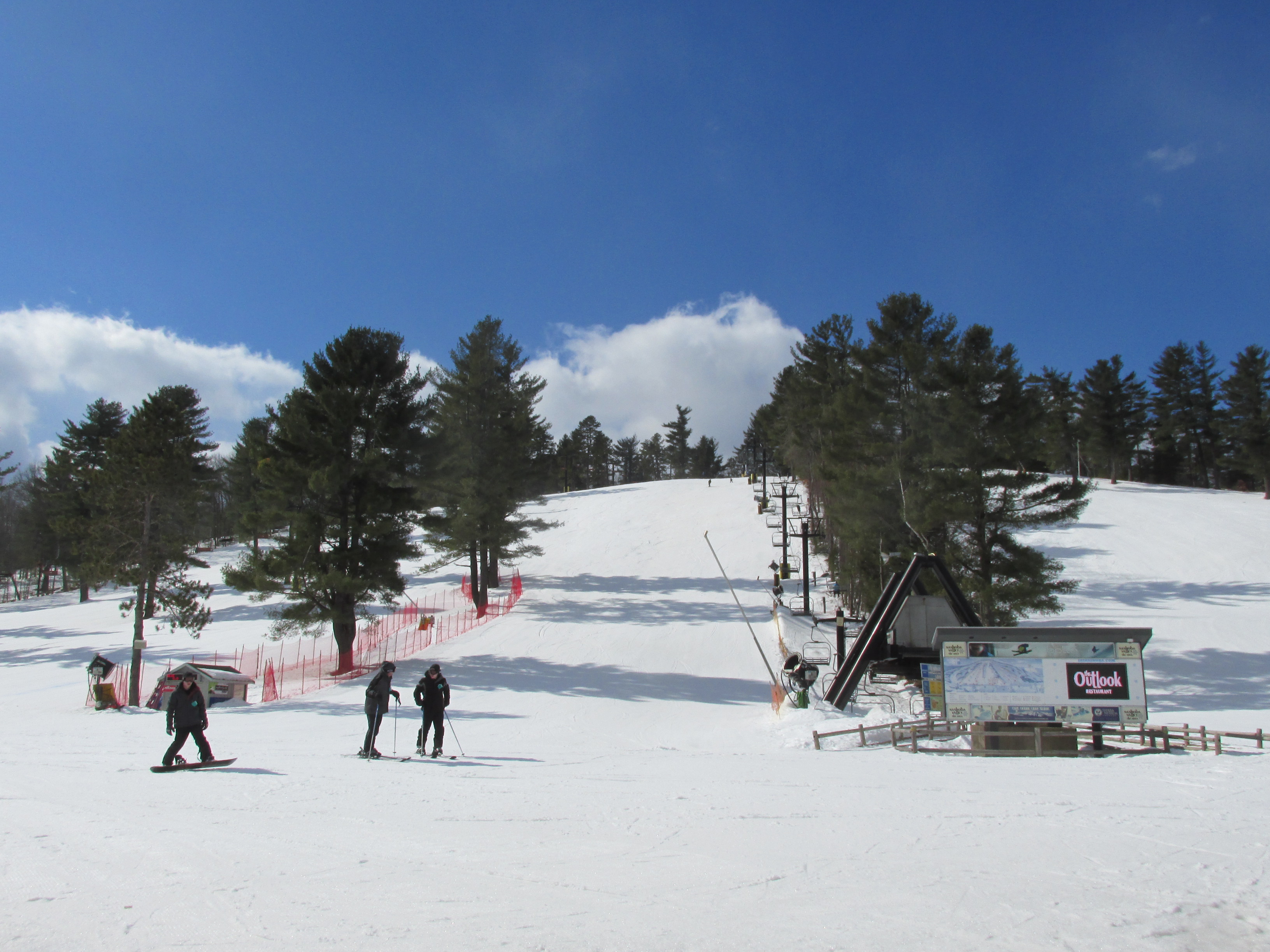
- Nashoba Valley Ski Area
- Interactive map of Nashoba Ski Resort
- Location: Westford, Massachusetts, US
- Nearest city: Boston, Massachusetts, US
- Coordinates: 42°32′31.11″N 71°26′38.77″W
- Vertical: 240 ft
- Top elevation: 422 ft (129 m)
- Base elevation: 194 ft (59 m)
- Trails: 17
- Lift system: 10 lifts: 4 chairlifts, 5 surface
- Terrain parks: 2
- Website: Nashoba Valley Ski Area

Nashoba Valley Ski Area is a ski area in Westford, Massachusetts, United States, located at 79 Powers Road. It borders on Littleton, Massachusetts and has been operating each winter since opening in 1964. It has 17 ski trails as well as a terrain park and tubing park. The tubing park has 16 runs served by two Poma handle tows and a Sun-Kid Conveyor; this is on the same property, but has a separate entrance on Route 119 in Littleton, Massachusetts.

== Lifts ==
The area is served by 4 chairlifts, 4 conveyor lifts, and 3 rope tows. Currently the top is only accessible by the chairlifts, but used to be served by a rope tow powered by an old school bus and a T-Bar. All intermediate and advanced terrain is accessible from any chairlift.

The beginner area goes about a quarter of the way up the hill. It is served by 3 rope tows and four Sun-Kid conveyor belt lifts. The longest trail is 1400 feet.

=== Chairlifts ===
Chief Triple is a Borvig triple chair.

Wardance Triple is a CTEC triple chair. It was built to replace the original rope tow to the top, although the two co-existed for a number of years.

Snowdance Double is a Savio double chair.

Sundance Triple is a CTEC triple chair.

=== Surface Lifts ===
Papoose is a Sun-Kid conveyor belt lift which replaces a gasoline-powered rope tow of the same name, which ran about 6 feet to the east of the present lift.

Totem is a Sun-Kid conveyor belt lift located adjacent to Papoose.

Pow Wow is a rope tow built out of an old dump truck. The rope runs between the double tires and over old car wheel rims mounted on old telephone poles. The lift was originally powered by the truck's diesel engine, but was later converted to run on an electric motor. This lift has two ropes that run parallel over both truck wheels, and is considered as two separate lifts. However, both ropes are powered by the same motor, so they start and stop at the same times.

Peace Pipe is a rope tow built in a similar fashion to the Pow Wow tow, except that it has only one rope.

Lil'Hawk is a Sun-Kid conveyor belt lift, which was originally built at the base of the lift line for the "Tomahawk T-Bar", but was later moved to a location between the bottom terminals of the Snowdance Double and the Sundance Triple.

Tahu is a Sun-Kid conveyor belt lift, this conveyor was brand new for the 2014-2015 season, operating between the beginner area and Nashoba Slope.

== Trails ==
Black Diamonds: Lobo, Warrior, Chief, Bull Run, Wardance

Blue Squares: Tomahawk, Big Bow, Dog Leg, Nashoba Slope, Nashoba Glades, Sundance (Usually freestyle terrain), Indian Run, Nashoba Trail

Green Circles:(accessible only by tow rope or magic carpet) Papoose, Pow-Wow, Peacepipe, Tahu

== Tubing Park ==
The tubing park is located at a separate entrance at 179 Great Rd, Littleton, MA 01460. The tubing park has 18 lanes serviced by a conveyor and 2 rope tows. The tubing park also has its own lodge and restaurant.

== Restaurants ==
- The Outlook Restaurant and Lounge
- The Sunset Tiki Bar and Grill

== See also ==
- List of ski areas and resorts in the United States
