= Lemberger =

Lemberger is a surname of German origin demonym for a person from the Polish city Lwów (German: Lemberg), now Lviv, Ukraine. Notable people with the surname include:

- Georg Lemberger (c.1490–1500 – c.1540–1545), German painter and woodcut artist
- Gerszon Lemberger, Polish Jewish actor
- Hans Leinberger sometimes given as Lemberger (c.1475/1480 – after 1531), Late Gothic sculptor from Altbayern
- Jean Lemberger (1924-1993), Polish Jew born French FTP-MOI from Des terroristes à la retraite
- LeAnn Lemberger, American writer published as "Leigh Michaels"
- Leopold Lemberger, Austrian-Swiss film director known as "Leopold Lindtberg"

== See also ==
- Blaufränkisch, a grape variety also known as Lemberger, or Blauer Limberger
- Lemberg (disambiguation)
