= Block Island Sound =

Strait in the Atlantic Ocean

Coordinates: 41.26°N 71.66°W

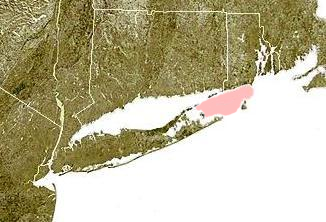
Block Island Sound, shown shaded in pink, between the coast of Rhode Island and Block Island.

Block Island Sound is a marine sound in the open Atlantic Ocean, approximately 10 miles (16 km) wide, separating Block Island from the coast of mainland Rhode Island. On the west, it extends to Montauk Point on the eastern tip of Long Island, as well as Plum Island, Gardiners Island, and Fishers Island, all in the state of New York.

Geographically, Block Island Sound extends west to Long Island Sound, Napeague Bay, and Gardiners Bay and east to Rhode Island Sound. The Block Island Sound forms part of the Intracoastal Waterway.

Three United States Navy warships have been named after the sound. See USS Block Island.
