= Albert J. Winkler =

American professor

Albert Julius Winkler
- Born: March 4, 1894; The Grove, Texas, U.S.
- Died: August 29, 1989 (aged 95); Woodland, California, U.S.
- Education: University of Texas; University of Missouri; UC Berkeley College of Natural Resources

Albert Julius Winkler (4 March 1894 – 29 August 1989) was an American professor of viticulture and one of its leading authorities. His name is famous for the Winkler index, developed with Maynard Amerine.

== Biography ==
Winkler was born and grew up on a farm in The Grove, Texas. He was the youngest child among 8 boys and 2 girls. Both of his parents were born in Germany, but they were married in the United States. His family made a 50-gallon barrel of wine each year. He graduated in 1918 with a bachelor's degree in plant physiology from the University of Texas and then served briefly in the U.S. Army as a lieutenant. He graduated in 1918 with an M.A. from the University of Missouri and in 1921 with a Ph.D. in pomology and plant physiology from the University of California, Berkeley.

In 1921 Winkler joined the faculty of the University of California, Davis (UC Davis) as an associate in viticulture at the University of California Agricultural Experiment Station at the University Farm, Davis. He became a full professor of viticulture in 1937 and chaired the department of viticulture and enology from 1935 to 1957. He retired as professor emeritus in 1963. He oversaw the development of the department at UC Davis into a leading center of research and education. His research and work with growers contributed considerably to the growth of California's wine and grape industry.

... Winkler spent much of his career as a specialist in wine grapes and wine making. But during the Prohibition era, 1919-33, he switched his research to table grapes and in the late 1920s pioneered a sulfur dioxide gassing process that made it possible to ship and market California grapes in the East. After Prohibition, Winkler returned to wine grape research.

Winkler's book General Viticulture (1st edition 1962, several later editions) became an international classic and is perhaps his greatest contribution to viticulture. The book has been translated into Spanish, Italian, Greek, Hindi, and Russian.

In 1919 he married Viola Lilly Pearl Buehrer (known as "Pearl", b. 1896). After 69 years of marriage she died in 1988 in Woodland, California. Upon his death in 1989 he was survived by 2 daughters, 5 grandchildren, and 8 great grandsons.

== Awards and honors ==
- 1925—elected a Fellow of the American Association for the Advancement of Science
- 1953–1954—President of the American Society for Enology and Viticulture
- 1954 — Silver Medal Award of Accademia Italiano della Vite e del Vino
