= Rhode Island Sound =

Strait off the coast of Rhode Island, USA

Coordinates: 41°26′00″N 71°12′58″W

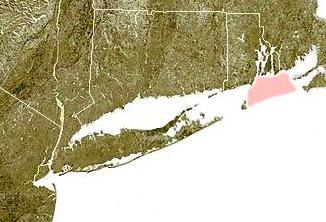
Rhode Island Sound, shown in pink

Rhode Island Sound is a sound off the coast of the U.S. state of Rhode Island at the mouth of Narragansett Bay. It begins east of Block Island Sound, continues to the east to Buzzards Bay, and opens south into the Atlantic Ocean between Block Island and Martha's Vineyard. The sound forms part of the Intracoastal Waterway.

== Geography ==
Geographically, Rhode Island Sound begins to the east of Block Island Sound, and continues to Buzzards Bay in the east. The Rhode Island Sound is approximately 2,500 km^{2} (970 sq mi) and has a maximum depth of 60 metres (200 ft). Average wave heights range from one to three metres (3.3 to 9.8 ft). Circulation and current strength are mostly impacted by the surrounding geology and not by wind strength. This causes the sea floor habitats in the Rhode Island Sound to be constantly changing.

=== Sedimentary processes ===
Studies conducted in 2006 by the Coastal Marine and Geology Program and the Long Island Sound Resource Center used digital terrain models to make topographical depictions of unknown glacial features and bedforms. Newfound glacial features include an ice-sculptured bedrock surface, residual stagnant-ice-contact deposits, a recessional moraine, and exposed glaciolacustrine sediments. Modern bedforms consist of fields of transverse sand waves, barchanoid waves, giant scour depressions, and pockmarks). Bedform asymmetry from multibeam bathymetric data indicate that net sediment transport is westward across the northern part of the study area near Fishers Island, and eastward across the southern part near Great Gull Island.

== Flora and fauna ==
=== Algae and kelp ===
Kelp population density is higher in the Rhode Island Sound compared to other temperate locations, particularly locations north of Rhode Island. However, even though annual kelp production is higher, the productivity of individual plants is lower due to lower biomass accumulation of fucoid algae. Studies conducted by Pilson, Asare, and Harlin between 1983 and 1985 illustrated that algal species such as Laminaria saccharina living in Rhode Island Sound waters have maximum nitrogen accumulation in their tissues, which directly correlates with maximum ambient inorganic nitrogen levels in tissues of other algal species as well. The cause of this is majorly impacted by large temporal fluctuations in the Rhode Island waters.

=== Invasive species ===
In 2008, research conducted by the University of Rhode Island, Graduate School of Oceanography, shows that there is an increase in the abundance of a tunicate species, Didemnum. The species has been spotted in the Rhode Island Sound area since 2000, but has been rapidly increasing in numbers ever since.
