= Nashoba Valley =

Area in North Central Massachusetts

The Nashoba Valley is an area in North Central Massachusetts that encompasses northwestern Middlesex and northeastern Worcester counties, located around the interchange of Interstate 495 and Massachusetts Route 2.

At one point, Littleton, Massachusetts, was known as the Praying Indian town of Nashoba. The hill that today is Nashoba Valley Ski Area is called Nashoba Hill.

== Towns ==
There is no precise definition, but the following towns generally consider themselves to be in the Nashoba Valley:

- Acton
- Ayer
- Bolton
- Boxborough
- Fort Devens
- Dunstable
- Groton
- Harvard
- Lancaster
- Littleton
- Pepperell
- Shirley
- Stow
- Townsend
- Westford

== Notable namesakes ==
- Nashoba Publishing, Devens
- Nashoba Regional High School, Bolton
- Nashoba Valley Medical Center, Ayer
- Nashoba Valley Ski Area, Westford, Littleton
- Nashoba Valley Technical High School, Westford
- Nashoba Valley Winery, Bolton
