= Maynard Amerine =

American wine researcher (1911-1998)

- Born: Maynard Andrew Amerine; 1911; San Jose, California, U.S.
- Died: 1998 (aged 86–87); St. Helena, California, U.S.

Academic background
- Education: UC Berkeley College of Natural Resources

Academic work
- Discipline: Oenology
- Institutions: University of California, Davis

Maynard Andrew Amerine (1911–1998) was a pioneering researcher in the cultivation, fermentation, and sensory evaluation of wine. His 16 books and some 400 articles contributed significantly to the development of the modern (post-Prohibition) wine industry in California; to the improvement of wine cultures in Europe, South America, and Australia; and to the professional standards for judging and tasting wine.

In the early 1940s, he and his colleague Albert J. Winkler developed the Winkler scale, a technique for classifying wine growing regions based on temperatures. His research, organizational, and advisory efforts in wine tasting helped bring about a more objective vocabulary to that field, based on flavors and scents rather than allusive references.

== Biography ==
Amerine was born in 1911 in San Jose, California, the child of Roy Reagan Amerine and Tennessee Davis Amerine. He grew up on their farm in Modesto, California. In 1935, while still completing his PhD in plant physiology at the University of California, Berkeley, he became the first faculty member hired into the new Viticulture and Enology Department at the University of California, Davis. He became full professor in 1952, was deemed All-University Lecturer in 1962, and continued his research and teaching at Davis until his retirement in 1974. He remained Professor Emeritus, served as an advisor at the Wine Institute in San Francisco, and continued to write, travel, and advise on wine production and evaluation nearly until his death in 1998.

Amerine was a featured guest on the January 23, 1961 episode of "To Tell the Truth" game show on the CBS television network accompanied with two impostors. Host Bud Collyer read a description of Amerine's work at UC Davis noting that his tasting class was "closed to undergraduates." Amerine sat in the middle seat (No. 2) flanked by the imposters. The celebrity panelists for the show were Tom Poston, Kitty Carlisle, Don Ameche and Polly Bergen. Bergen asked "Amerine" No. 3: "Where is the University of California, besides being in California?" No. 3 answered that the branch where he taught was in Davis, CA; Bergen seemed extremely dubious about this answer apparently not familiar with the fact that UC has a Davis campus, perhaps expecting "Berkeley" or "Los Angeles." The panelists all failed to correctly identify Amerine; three votes went to No. 1 and one to No. 3. Amerine and the two impostors shared the $1000 prize for fooling the entire panel.

The first named professorship at the University of California was endowed in Amerine's honor, as the Maynard Amerine Chair, by Ernest Gallo (an early classmate of Amerine's). In 1991, the Maynard A. Amerine Room and Wine Collection in Shields Library was named in his honor and to house his extensive collection of books, a product of his years as a wine bibliographer and collector.

His wine of choice was California Zinfandel.

== Selected publications ==
- 1965. Wine, An Introduction. Revised edition 1975 with Vernon L. Singleton.
- 1976. Wines: Their Sensory Evaluation, with Edward B. Roessler (W.H. Freeman & Company). Revised and enlarged, 1983.
- Table Wines and Dessert and Appetizer Wines, with Maynard A. Joslyn.
- Technology of Winemaking, with William V. Cruess, Harold W. Berg; revised with Ralph E. Kunkee, Cornelius S. Ough, Vernon L. Singleton, and A. Dinsmore Webb.
