= Winkler index =

Climate classification system

The Winkler Index, sometimes known as the Winkler Scale or Winkler Regions, is a technique for classifying the climate of wine growing regions based on heat summation or growing degree-days. In the system, geographical areas are divided into five climate regions based on temperature converted to growing degree-days, and is commonly known as Regions I–V (see below). The system was developed at the University of California, Davis by A. J. Winkler and Maynard Amerine.

== The system ==
The system is based on both the hypothesis and observations that grapevines do not grow if the temperature is below 50 °F (10 °C). Each day during the growing season are assigned growing degree-days according to the amount that the day's average temperature exceeds this threshold. This is assumed under the system to be April 1 through October 31 in the Northern Hemisphere, October 1 through April 30 in the Southern Hemisphere. One degree day per degree Fahrenheit over 50 °F, or with SI units, degrees Celsius over 10 °C is used.

== Calculation of the Winkler Index ==
The Winkler Index, or Growing Degree Days (GDD), measures heat accumulation for vine growth during the growing season (spring and summer). It sums daily average temperatures above a base threshold of 10°C (50°F).

=== Formula ===
$Wi = \sum_{\text{Apr 1}}^{\text{Oct 31}} \left( \left(\frac{T_{\text{max}},d + T_{\text{min}},d}{2}\right) -T_{\text{base}},0 \right)$

Where:

- $T{\text{max}}$: Maximum temperature on day ( d ).
- $T{\text{min}}$: Minimum temperature on day ( d ).
- $T{\text{base}}$: Base temperature, typically 10°C (50°F).
- If the result is negative, use 0 for that day.
- ( n ): Number of days in the growing season Northern Hemisphere.

=== Periods ===
- Northern Hemisphere: April 1 to October 31 (spring and summer).
- Southern Hemisphere: October 1 to April 30 (spring and summer).

=== Steps ===
1. Collect daily maximum $T_{\text{max}},d$ and minimum $T_{\text{min}},d$ temperatures.
2. Calculate daily average: $\frac{T_{\text{max}} + T_{\text{min}}}{2}$.
3. Subtract $T{\text{base}}$ (50°F) or (10°C). If negative, record 0.
4. Sum daily values over the period to get total GDD

All days during the growing season are then added up, all negative values are set to zero, with the sum of the growing degree-days used to determine the region's classification in the original Winkler index as follows:

Winkler index
Region/class	°F units	°C units	General ripening capability and wine style
Region Ia	1500–2000	850–1111	Only very early ripening varieties achieve high quality, mostly hybrid grape varieties and some V. vinifera.
Region Ib	2001–2500	1111–1389	Only early ripening varieties achieve high quality, some hybrid grape varieties but mostly V. vinifera.
Region II	2501–3000	1389–1667	Early and mid-season table wine varieties will produce good quality wines.
Region III	3001–3500	1668–1944	Favorable for high production of standard to good quality table wines.
Region IV	3501–4000	1945–2222	Favorable for high production, but acceptable table wine quality at best.
Region V	4001–4900	2223–2700	Typically only suitable for extremely high production, fair quality table wine or table grape varieties destined for early season consumption are grown.

The system was originally developed for and is used officially in California and was based on the general ripening capabilities and wine styles that can be achieved in the climate due to heat accumulation (growing degree-days). The general ripening capabilities include hybrid grape varieties through early season, mid-season, and late season ripening V. Vinifera and even table grapes in the warmest areas of Region V. The general wine styles include lighter, more subtle wines with lower alcohol and brighter fruit aromas and flavors, including Champagne and other sparkling wines, found in cooler climates (Regions Ia, Ib, II and lower III) to bolder, bigger wines often with higher alcohol and lush, darker fruit aromas and flavors that are found in warmer climates (Region III, IV and V). Region V was stated as also having a tendency to be more suitable to higher production wines, Sherry and other fortified wines.

One issue with the original work done by Amerine and Winkler was that it did not specify a lower class limit for Region I (originally 2500 or less) or an upper class limit for Region V (originally 4000 or greater). Subsequent research using high resolution spatial climate data identified these limits for California, Oregon, Washington and Idaho, along with Australia. The results provided a lower bound to Region I of 1500 °F units (850 °C units) and an upper bound to Region V of 4900 °F units (2700 °C units). Additional research in other wine regions found that Region I was best divided into a Region Ia (very early ripening varieties, mostly hybrid grapes) and Region Ib (early ripening varieties, mostly V. Vinifera).

The Winkler Index is also widely used in many other growing regions in the United States, such as Oregon and Washington, along with Canada, South America, Australia, New Zealand, South Africa, and Europe. However, it is less widely used in Europe where the Huglin index is favored. The Huglin index uses a similar formula but gives more weight to maximum temperatures and uses an adjustment for longer day lengths found at higher latitudes. It is also functionally similar to growing season average temperatures (simple average of temperatures across the seven month growing season).

== Application ==
The table below provides examples of the ripening and wine style concept used in the application of the Winkler Index for numerous wine regions globally. Region Ia are the coolest areas with known regions including Champagne, Central Otago, and Valais. Region Ia also includes numerous newer regions growing grapes and making wine including southern England, areas in northern Europe, Nova Scotia, and southern areas of Chile and Argentina. Region Ia areas ripen a range of hybrid grapes and some very early ripening V. Vinifera.

Region Ib is slightly warmer, can ripen early varieties such as Chardonnay, Pinot noir, Sauvignon blanc or Riesling with characteristic locations within the Rhine and Mosel valleys, Burgundy and the Loire Valley, or the Willamette Valley in Oregon as good examples. Region II includes cooler locations within areas such as Bordeaux, Coonawarra, and Valle de Curicó in Chile. Warmer areas in these wine regions fall in a Winkler Region III as do much of the Northern Rhône, Rioja, Umbria, and the Margaret River.

Region IV includes portions of the Napa Valley, Stellenbosch, Corsica, Tuscany, and Alentejo where the warmer climates allow for the ripening of later varieties such as Cabernet sauvignon, Sangiovese, and Syrah. The warmest areas are found in Region V and include areas in the central valley of California, inland Australia and wine producing regions in Morocco, Madeira, Apulia, and Jerez.

Table of wine regions in various countries worldwide. The city represents the location of the weather station that was used to calculate the growing season average temperatures (GST) and growing degree-days for classifying into Winkler Regions. The data represent either the 1981-2010 climatological normals or period of record for that station. Data come from the World Atlas of Wine and a publication on cool climate regions from the International Cool Climate Wine Symposium (ICCWS)
Country	Wine Region	City	GST (°F)	GDD (°F units)	Winkler Region
Argentina	Rio Negro	Bariloche	55.6	1194	Region Ia
Chile	Lake District	Puerto Montt	55.8	1233	Region Ia
Denmark		Aalborg	55.8	1233	Region Ia
Washington	Puget Sound	Port Angeles	56.1	1310	Region Ia
Germany	Ruwer	Kasel	56.9	1472	Region Ia
Sweden		Gothenborg	57.0	1502	Region Ia
England	Kent	East Malling	57.3	1562	Region Ia
Canada	Nova Scotia	Kentville	57.4	1579	Region Ia
Michigan	Leelanau Peninsula	Traverse City	57.9	1695	Region Ia
Australia	Tasmania	Launceston	58.0	1709	Region Ia
New Zealand	Central Otago	Queenstown	58.1	1733	Region Ia
Netherlands		Maastricht	58.3	1772	Region Ia
France	Champagne	Reims	58.4	1805	Region Ia
Austria	Kremstal	Krems	58.5	1821	Region Ia
Poland	Lubuskie	Zielona Góra	58.6	1849	Region Ia
Switzerland	Valais	Sion	58.7	1871	Region Ia
England	Sussex	Eastbourne	58.8	1887	Region Ia
Canada	Okanagan Valley	Vernon	59.0	1926	Region Ia
Germany	Rhine Valley	Geisenheim	59.4	2003	Region Ib
New Zealand	Marlborough	Blenheim	59.7	2075	Region Ib
Canada	Niagara Peninsula	St. Catharines	60.1	2152	Region Ib
France	Burgundy	Dijon	60.3	2196	Region Ib
Spain	Ribera del Duero	Valladolid	60.3	2211	Region Ib
France	Alsace	Colmar	60.4	2218	Region Ib
Hungary	Tokaj	Tokaj	60.4	2229	Region Ib
Australia	Tasmania	Hobart	60.4	2234	Region Ib
Oregon	Willamette Valley	McMinnville	60.6	2273	Region Ib
Romania	Zeletin	Bacău	60.7	2295	Region Ib
California	Central Coast	Santa Maria	60.7	2296	Region Ib
France	Loire Valley	Nantes	61.0	2355	Region Ib
Germany	Baden	Freiburg	61.2	2403	Region Ib
France	Savoie	Chambéry	61.5	2454	Region Ib
Ukraine	Crimea	Simferopol	61.7	2504	Region II
Australia	Coonawarra	Coonawarra	61.9	2553	Region II
Spain	Rias Baixas	Vigo	62.2	2619	Region II
New Zealand	Hawke's Bay	Napier	62.9	2768	Region II
Australia	Adelaide Hills	Lenswood	63.2	2817	Region II
Portugal	Douro Valley	Vila Real	63.4	2861	Region II
Chile	Valle de Curicó	Curicó	63.4	2864	Region II
Italy	Piedmont	Torino	63.8	2958	Region II
France	Bordeaux	Merignac	63.8	2961	Region II
Washington	Columbia Valley	Prosser	64.0	2993	Region II
Italy	Alto Adige	Bolzano	64.1	3016	Region III
France	Northern Rhône	Valence	64.1	3027	Region III
Italy	Friuli	Udine	64.4	3082	Region III
Italy	Umbria	Perugia	64.6	3132	Region III
Spain	Rioja	Logrono	64.8	3167	Region III
California	Sonoma Valley	Sonoma	64.9	3189	Region III
Bulgaria	Thracian Valley	Plovdiv	64.9	3192	Region III
Russia	Krasnodar	Krasnodar Krai	65.0	3219	Region III
Australia	Yarra Valley	Healesville	65.5	3325	Region III
California	Mendocino	Ukiah	65.8	3384	Region III
Virginia	Monticello	Charlottesville	66.1	3442	Region III
Australia	Margaret River	Margaret River	66.2	3472	Region III
Italy	Verona	Verona	66.4	3509	Region IV
France	Languedoc	Béziers	66.7	3577	Region IV
California	Napa Valley	St Helena	66.8	3601	Region IV
California	Northern Sonoma	Healdsburg	67.1	3650	Region IV
France	Southern Rhône	Avignon	67.4	3725	Region IV
South Africa	Stellenbosch	Nietvoorbij	67.5	3751	Region IV
Australia	Barossa Valley	Nuriootpa	67.6	3756	Region IV
France	Roussillon	Perpignan	67.6	3769	Region IV
France	Corsica	Bastia	67.6	3775	Region IV
Spain	Catalunya	Reus	68.0	3845	Region IV
Portugal	Alentejo	Evora	68.1	3874	Region IV
Italy	Tuscany	Firenze	68.3	3907	Region IV
Portugal	Estremadura	Lisbon	68.7	3995	Region IV
California	Lodi	Lodi	68.7	4005	Region V
Japan	Yamanashi	Kofu	69.3	4140	Region V
Morocco	Meknes-Tafilalet	Meknes	69.4	4149	Region V
Portugal	Madeira	Funchal	69.8	4243	Region V
Italy	Apulia	Brindisi	69.9	4250	Region V
Greece	Patras	Patras	70.1	4292	Region V
Australia	Hunter Valley	Cessnock	71.0	4497	Region V
Spain	Jerez	Jerez de la Frontera	71.4	4575	Region V

== Issues and limitations ==
There are numerous issues and limitations associated with the use of growing degree-days. First, the Winkler index and its classification of climate regions by growing degree-days only describe one aspect of an area's climate—mean daily temperature. Many other important factors which contribute to a region's suitability for viticulture (and its terroir) are excluded; among them sun exposure, latitude, precipitation, soil conditions, and the risk of extreme weather which might damage grapevines (e.g., winter freezes, spring and fall frosts, hail, etc.).

As originally developed the climates of California were defined for relatively large areas using only one or two climate stations. This macroscale approach will invariably not capture the microscale influences that are an important aspect of growing any crop. To address these issues research has been increasingly using spatial climate data to better depict within region and even within vineyard differences in climate and therefore ripening and wine style potential.

To create spatially appropriate climate data, numerous stations and/or sensors are used to collect data which can then be interpolated over the landscape due to known interactions with elevation, aspect, slope, and distance to the coast or other water bodies using Geographic Information Systems (GIS). Instead of depicting a region as all one Winkler region (Napa Valley AVA being a Region III for example), spatial data summaries show the Napa Valley having a full range of Winkler regions, 12% a Region II, 56% a Region III, and 30% a Region IV (whereas the table above shows one station in Napa, St. Helena as being a Region IV).

Other significant differences exist depending on the time period of the data and formula used for calculating growing degree-days. First, to be comparable growing degree-day numbers from various sources need to come from the same time period. Due to both a variable climate and climate change, a comparison of a ten-year period from the 1970s and the 2000s would be inappropriate as the variation and trends over time would make them incomparable. A sufficient time period is suggested to allow the averaging to smooth out some of the variability. The standard time period in use is the climatological normal period of 30 years, however if 30 years of data is not available then at the minimum five years should be used.

However a five-year period is not directly comparable to a 30-year period. How data are averaged (i.e., hourly, daily, or monthly) is also very important. While weather stations today can average data to an hour, a minutes or even seconds, historical data used to calculate growing degree-days has been done mostly on daily or monthly averages (the table above was done using monthly climatological normals). Shorter term averaging to minutes, or more commonly hourly, arguably better reflects the true thermal effects on the crops, but will result in growing degree-day values that are lower than both daily and monthly. Monthly averaged data can be very problematic as it can underestimate heat accumulation during the first and last months of the growing season. Therefore, it is paramount that one know the time period that the growing degree-day values are calculated from so as to be comparable.

The Winkler index uses the standard method of calculating growing degree-days in viticulture and is based on using a base temperature of 50 °F (10 °C) with no upper temperature cut-off. The first issue is that 50 °F (10 °C) is not likely the best base temperature even though it is the most commonly used value. Even the early research on this topic stressed that the base temperature threshold for accumulation for early versus late budding varieties is likely strongly cultivar specific. Various research worldwide has pointed to base temperatures ranging from 39 to 45 °F (4 to 7 °C), but there has been little confirmation of these thresholds across numerous wine regions and for a wider range of varieties.

At the other end of the formula, the calculation for growing degree-days used in viticulture and wine production does not normally use an upper cut-off. Conceptually an upper cut-off would be applied if the plant system stopped being photosynthetically active at some point due to heat stress from high temperatures. While this may be proven for some crops, there is not a universal number for an upper threshold for grapes so the majority of the published data for comparison purposes in viticulture and wine production does not limit maximum temperatures. This issue is problematic because many weather stations today have integrated the corn growing degree-day method in their software. The corn growing degree-day method uses both a base temperature adjustment and an upper threshold, neither of which are common in viticulture and wine production use, and can confound any comparison with published data using the simple average method.

Furthermore, more complex climate indices have been introduced to address perceived shortcomings in the Winkler index including the Huglin Index, the Biologically Effective Degree-Day Index, and the Multicriteria Climatic Classification system (Geoviticulture MCC). These indices attempt to account for day length and solar, frost, and drought variability that can be found in different locations. Each have been used in various research settings, but have some limitations to the general user in that some variables needed to calculate the indices are not readily available from all weather/climate stations and/or to the general public.

Overall each of these issues needs to be carefully considered when comparing growing degree-day values from published data in magazines, books, scientific articles, and even from growers in the same region.

== See also ==
- Growing degree-day
