= Buckner Cave =

Cave in Indiana, USA

Buckner Cave is located in the karst topography of the Crawford Upland in Monroe County, Indiana, United States just outside Bloomington. The cave contains approximately 3 miles of known passage. It is managed by the Richard Blenz Nature Conservancy (RBNC) and resides in privately owned property. Over the years, the cave has been heavily vandalized with spray paint and trashed out from garbage including; food wrappers, broken bottles, empty beer cans, and spent calcium carbonate from carbide lamps. There is an ongoing effort to restore the cave to its natural state.

== Historical evidence ==
It is alleged that the earliest known signature recorded found in the cave was from a visitor with the inscription "L. V. Cushing" and "Nov. 23, 1775, " which astute cavers will notice hidden beneath the destruction caused by the cave graffiti.

== Cave layout ==
Its entrance is an oval shaped sinkhole approximately 15 ft tall and 20 ft wide which leads downwards in a gentle incline for about 50 ft and then opens up into a large room. Access to the rest of the cave is found through a small hole that brings explorers to an approximately 600 foot army crawl to the next large cavern. From here the cave branches into areas abandoned by flowing water and areas with flowing water. Many paths and routes through the cave exist with several having offshoots.

Most of the caverns and passages have been cut out by water over the ages and generally appear to be quite safe. Some areas, especially the side-tunnels and offshoots, are underneath piles of large rocks. A significant section of the cave runs along what is a still running stream that is never more than a couple of feet in depth. Small bats may be found throughout the cave.

Graffiti is rather prominent in many parts of the cave. Though vandals have destroyed many of the natural rock formations in the cave, it remains a complex mesh of tunnels and squeezes.

== Difficulty ==
Buckner Cave is easily traversable without rope or special equipment. Many areas have low ceilings and necessitate hands and belly crawling. Areas in the lower parts of the cave are near a shallow stream.

== Visiting the cave ==
Interested visitors need to obtain permission from the RBNC one week in advance in order to enter. Alternatively, people can become members of the RBNC to help maintain the cave as well as benefit from expedited access.

== See also ==
- Mitchell Plain
