= Indiana Uplands AVA =

American Viticultural Area in Indiana

Coordinates: 39°15′02″N 86°26′50″W

Indiana Uplands
- Wine region
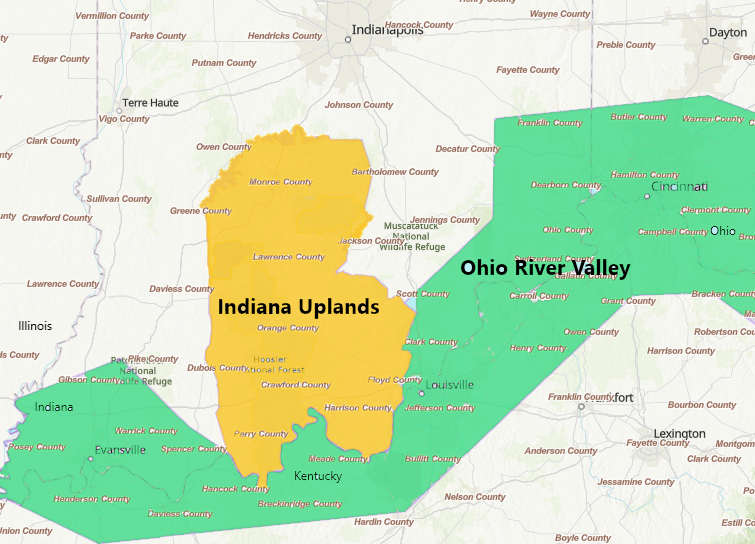
- Type: American Viticultural Area
- Year established: 2013
- Years of wine industry: 183
- Country: United States
- Part of: Indiana
- Other regions in Indiana: Ohio River Valley AVA
- Growing season: 170 days
- Climate region: Region III-IV
- Heat units: 3,318–3,426 GDD
- Precipitation (annual average): 47 in (1,200 mm)
- Soil conditions: discontinuous loess over weathered sandstone, shale, or limestone
- Total area: 4,800 sq mi (3,100,000 acres)
- Size of planted vineyards: 200 acres (81 ha)
- No. of vineyards: 19
- Grapes produced: Catawba, Chambourcin, Cayuga, Traminette, Vidal, Vignoles
- No. of wineries: 17

Indiana Uplands is an American Viticultural Area (AVA) encompassing much of the Indiana Uplands landform located in south-central Indiana. Its southern and eastern boundaries border the established multi-state Ohio River Valley AVA. The area was established on February 4, 2013, by the Alcohol and Tobacco Tax and Trade Bureau (TTB), Treasury after reviewing the petition submitted by Jim L. Butler, president of Butler Winery of Bloomington, Indiana, on behalf of himself and local vintners, proposing the viticultural area to be named "Indiana Uplands."

TTB modified the boundary of the established 26,000 square miles (16,640,000 acres) Ohio River Valley AVA decreasing its size by approximately 1,530 square miles (980,000 acres) to eliminate a potential overlap with Indiana Uplands. At the outset, Indiana Uplands contained 19 vineyards with approximately 200 acres (81 ha) under vine, 2 planned vineyards of 15 to 20 acres (6–8 ha) each, and 17 wineries; the existing and planned vineyards are geographically distributed throughout the viticultural area, according to a map submitted with the petition. Once the final rule was established the Indiana Uplands viticultural area and the boundary of the Ohio River Valley viticultural area became effective, the TTB set a transition rule to label wines produced from grapes grown in the 1,530 sq mi (980,000 acres) area that was formerly within the Ohio River Valley viticultural area. Labels containing the words "Ohio River Valley" in the brand name or as appellation of origin may be used on wine bottled within two years from the effective date of the final rule, provided that such label was approved prior to the effective date and the wine conforms to the standards for use of the label in effect prior to the final rule. At the end of the two-year transition period, a wine was no longer eligible for labeling with the Ohio River Valley viticultural area name or as an appellation of origin would not be permitted on the bottle.

Indiana Uplands' 4,800 square miles (3,100,000 acres) extends 110 miles (180 km) north to south beginning at the line that separates Morgan and Monroe counties and extends south to the Ohio River at the Kentucky border. The viticultural area extends approximately 63 miles (101 km) east to west at its widest point, from Clark County to Martin County. Nineteen Indiana counties are located partially or totally within the viticultural area: Monroe, Brown, Morgan, Owen, Greene, Lawrence, Bartholomew, Orange, Washington, Floyd, Harrison, Perry, Crawford, Jackson, Martin, Daviess, Dubois, Scott, and Spencer.

== History ==
Most pioneers and early farmers in the Indiana Uplands grew orchards and vineyards. Apples, peaches, grapes, plums and pears were common. In several places peaches were canned for the commercial market before 1880. Between 1843 and 1846, Simon Huber planted vineyards and orchards in Starlight in Clark County, Indiana, and he commercially produced wine until the early 1900s. During that same era, five miles (8.0 km) south of the Huber vineyard, "Pop" Stumler also grew grapes and made and marketed wine. Each winemaker produced approximately 1,000 US gallons (3,800 L) of wine annually. The 1880 census reported that 26,000 US gallons (98,000 L) of wine were produced within the Indiana Uplands region that year, which constituted approximately one quarter of the wine produced in Indiana. Winemaking in the region continued in the 1890s and early 1900s, with John Sacksteder producing 10,000 US gallons (38,000 L) of wine annually in Leavenworth, Perry County, Indiana, which included the ceremonial wine for the Roman Catholic Diocese of Kentucky. Prohibition halted the commercial production of wine in the Indiana Uplands region, but grape growing in the region regained popularity beginning in the 1960s. In 1966, grapevines were planted at the Oliver Winery northwest of Bloomington; in 1971, grapevines were planted at the Easley Winery at Cape Sandy near the Ohio River and the Possum Trot Winery near Unionville; and, in 1987, the Huber family started replanting grapevines. The “Indiana Uplands" geographic name was first commonly used for the region in which the viticultural area resides beginning in the 1920s, and today that region is still referred to as the “Indiana Uplands." Oliver Winery is the largest and oldest winery in Indiana.

== Terroir ==
The distinguishing features of the Indiana Uplands viticultural area include its geology, topography, comparatively high plateau elevations, thin residual soils mantled with loess, and a distinctively cool growing season climate. In contrast to the viticultural area, the surrounding regions outside of it have lower elevations, evidence of repeated glacial advances, and different soils and topography. In addition, the surrounding regions to the east, south, and west of the Indiana Uplands plateau have a warmer growing season climate.

=== Topography ===
The Indiana Uplands viticultural area plateau landscape contains numerous creeks that feed into lakes and rivers, according to the USGS maps. The terrain is generally hilly throughout the region, especially in the rural forests, parks, and wilderness areas. In addition, according to the USGS maps, steep ridges predominate along much of the boundary line, marking where the plateau descends to the surrounding lower elevations. At the approximate center of the Indiana Uplands viticultural area are the Hoosier National Forest and Monroe Lake, which are surrounded by other forests, parks, lakes, and recreation areas. According to USGS maps, the plateau that comprises the Indiana Uplands viticultural area gradually descends from an elevation of 1,033 feet (315 m) in the northeast corner to an elevation of 358 feet (109 m) in the southwest corner, although glacial till deposits moderate some differences in elevations along the boundary line. The Ohio River bluffs rise to a height of 600 feet (180 m) above the water line in some areas within the viticultural area. Elevations generally are higher within the viticultural area than in the surrounding areas.
In the northeast portion of the Indiana Uplands plateau generally reach 850 to 950 feet (260–290 m), and the Knobstone Escarpment, which defines part of the eastern and northern portions of the boundary line, reaches an elevation of approximately 1,000 feet (300 m), according to USGS maps. Elevations in the southeast portion of the Indiana Uplands viticultural area generally vary between 450 to 600 feet (140–180 m). The lowest point in the viticultural area is at an elevation of 358 feet (109 m) at the confluence of the Anderson and Ohio Rivers in the southwestern corner of the viticultural area, according to USGS maps. As noted above, there are three physiographic units within the Indiana Uplands viticultural area: The Norman Upland, the Mitchell Plateau, and the Crawford Upland. Each of these physiographic units is underlain by different rock materials of different ages (including shale, limestone, and sandstone) that have different rates of erosion, resulting in a variety of landforms within the Indiana Uplands region: The Norman Uplands in the eastern portion of the viticultural area is generally characterized by flat-topped ridges with steep slopes that form deep V-shaped valleys and strong relief; the Mitchell Plateau in the center ranges from relatively steep topography drained by surface streams to undulating plains with sinkholes for underground drainage; and the Crawford Upland in the west resembles the Norman Upland but with greater local relief of 350 to 500 feet (110–150 m). By contrast, the surrounding areas to the east, north, and west contain different physiographic units, which similarly affect the topography and soils in those areas. The Illinoian glacial advance stopped before reaching the Boonville Hills to the southwest of the Indiana Uplands, where windblown sand and silt cover the predominant undulating topography. The wider valleys of the Boonville Hills are characterized by island-like masses of bedrock covering several square miles that rise 100 to 150 feet (30–46 m) above the surrounding areas. To the east of the viticultural area, relatively nonresistant late Devonian and early Mississippian shales underlie the low relief of the Scottsburg Lowland, with elevations below the viticultural area ranging from approximately 750 feet (230 m) to the northeast of the viticultural area to 500 feet (150 m) to the southeast of the viticultural area. The northern portion of the Scottsburg Lowland is partially filled with up to 150 feet (46 m) of glacial drift, which reduces the elevation differential compared to the Indiana Uplands plateau to 150 feet (46 m) in that area. The area to the north of the Indiana Uplands area, recently designated as the Martinsville Hills, contains thick glacial deposits that nearly obscure the general form of the bedrock units. The Wabash Lowland, a broad lowland with an average elevation of 500 ft (150 m) and a partial blanket of glacial till, is locate to the west of the viticultural area. Although the same three physiographic units of the Indiana Uplands area—the Norman Upland, the Mitchell Plateau, and the Crawford Upland—generally extend south into Kentucky, the region to the south of the Indiana Uplands plateau is separated from the viticultural area by the Ohio River Valley.

=== Climate ===
The elevations and topography of the Indiana Uplands viticultural area contribute to the unique climatic conditions within the viticultural area. Cold air drainage from vineyards on the hilltops and ridges of the elevated plateau landform flows as much as 350 feet (110 m) to the valleys below, creating air movement, limiting frost accumulation in the vineyards, and extending the growing season in spring and fall. In addition, the hilltops and ridges in the area catch breezes that keep the fruit dry and free of fungus and mildew. Consequently, as described below, air temperature and precipitation are distinguishing climatic features of the Indiana Uplands viticultural area.
Summer and winter temperatures in the Indiana Uplands viticultural area normally are cooler than those in areas to the east, south, and west of the plateau. The cooler temperatures result in lower total accumulated growing degree days (GDD) during the growing season (April through October), as compared to most surrounding areas. Temperatures and GDDs on the Indiana Uplands plateau are generally lower than in most areas outside the plateau; only the adjacent northwest area has cooler growing conditions. According to petition data, most of the viticultural area is located in climatic Region III, with some Region IV areas on the western and southern margins. By contrast, the surrounding areas outside of the viticultural area generally are in Region IV. As previously noted, over time, the heavier precipitation in the region has contributed to greater soil erosion on the Indiana Uplands plateau than in other parts of the state as well as an increased breakdown of organic material in the soil. The increased precipitation does not negatively affect grape-growing in the region, however, because the heaviest precipitation occurs from November through May (according to data from the National Climactic Data Center (1971–2000)). The annual rainfall in the Indiana Uplands viticultural area is approximately the same from June through October as compared to the rest of Indiana, resulting in relatively dry soils for the important grape ripening months of August, September, and October.

=== Geology ===
The underlying bedrock of the Indiana Uplands viticultural area is a factor that contributes to its uniqueness as a grape-growing area because the bedrock influences the area's distinctive topography, climate, and soils. The bedrock, which was formed in a shallow inland sea during the Mississippian period approximately 345 to 325 million years ago, is composed of layers of limestone, shale, and sandstone that tilt west-southwesterly and descend 25 to 30 feet (7.6–9.1 m) in elevation per mile. Based on its topographic tilt, the bedrock near the surface is more recent from east to west across the region. During the Illinoian glacial advance, glaciers advanced up to and proceeded around the Indiana Uplands viticultural area on its west, north, and east sides, leaving relatively higher elevations on the plateau landform as compared to the rest of Indiana. Over time, the plateau remained free from glacial advances due to the height of the plateau. Several studies that attempted to define the perimeter of the glacier boundary line surrounding the Indiana Uplands region produced somewhat differing results; as the boundary line of the Indiana Uplands viticultural area follows a conservative estimate of glacial advances and conforms to the physiographic units of the region. Due to the lack of glaciations in the region, the topography of the Indiana Uplands viticultural area strongly reflects the structure of its bedrock. As a result, the landforms within the Indiana Uplands plateau region were primarily created by the weathering and stream erosion of the bedrock, which created the steep valleys and high ridges that are common throughout the area. Although the Indiana Uplands region was generally not glaciated, there was some glacial intrusion around the edges of the plateau, resulting in a thin layer of glacial drift over the bedrock in those areas.

=== Soils ===
Indiana Uplands viticultural area contains soils formed predominantly in discontinuous loess over weathered sandstone, shale, or limestone. The thin residual soils formed in loess overlying the parent material contrast with the surrounding glacial deposits to the west, north, and east of the Indiana Uplands plateau. The predominant soil types in the Indiana Uplands viticultural area belong to the red-yellow podzolic soil group. These soils are more common on the unglaciated Indiana Uplands than in other areas of Indiana, and the subsoil of these soils varies from red through yellowish-red and a brighter yellowish-brown silt loam to silty clay loam. Due to the relatively low fertility of these soils, applications of lime and fertilizer and good vineyard management practices are needed in this area. The erosion rate of the soils in the Indiana Uplands region exceeds that of soils located in other areas of Indiana. Erosion is a significant problem in the Indiana Uplands region due to: (1) Its commonly steep, rugged terrain; (2) the greater incidence of heavy rains than in other areas of the state; and (3) poor farming practices in the 1800s. These factors have caused a depletion in the quantity of topsoil in the ridges and hilltops in the region, which results in a significant decrease in the potential productivity of the soils in the Indiana Uplands viticultural area for general agricultural purposes. Two general soil associations formed in the region encompassed by the Indiana Uplands viticultural area. One soil association, consisting of Zanesville, Tilsit, Wellston, Gilpin, Berks, Montevallo, Ramsey, and Muskingum soils, is located on the Norman Upland on the east side of the Indiana Uplands plateau and on the Crawford Upland on the west side. The second soil association consists of Frederick, Bewleyville, and Crider soils, which are located on the Mitchell Plateau in the middle of the Indiana Uplands region. To the east of the Indiana Uplands viticultural area, the soils formed in moderately thick loess over weathered loamy glacial till. The predominant soils include the well-drained Cincinnati and Hickory soils, the moderately well-drained Ross and Moyne soils, and the poorly drained Avonburg soils. To the west and north of the Indiana Uplands viticultural area, the soils of the western lobe of the Illinoian Till Plain range from thick to moderately thick loess deposits over weathered loamy glacial till.
The well drained-Cincinnati soils, the moderately well-drained Avenue soils, and the poorly drained-Vigo soils are predominant in these areas. Only to the south of the Indiana Uplands viticultural area, across the Ohio River in Kentucky, are adjacent soils similar to those on the Indiana Uplands. Although the thin, acidic, and in some places poorly drained soils of the Indiana Uplands region are not suited to most types of farming without liming, deep plowing, or installation of tile drainage in areas with hardpans, these soils are not incompatible with grape growing. As Albert J. Winkler stated, "[t]he largest vines and the heaviest crops are produced on deep, fertile soils. The quality of fruit is better, although the yields are usually lower, on soils of lower fertility or soils limited in depth by hardpan, rocks, or clay substrata." Similarly, although the soils in the Indiana Uplands viticultural area are thinner and less productive than those in surrounding regions, the petitioner notes that they should produce quality fruit and wines of a distinctive character.

== See also ==
- Indiana wine
