= Upland Brewing Company =

American brewery

- Industry: Alcoholic beverage
- Founded: 1998
- Headquarters: Bloomington, Indiana; United States
- Number of locations: Ten Locations
- Products: Beer
- Services: Brewing; Hospitality; Catering; Wholesale
- Owner: Eddie DeSalle, Adam Estes, Ryan Moravec, Padraig Cullen
- Website: https://uplandbeer.com/

Upland Brewing Company, established in 1998 in Bloomington, Indiana, United States is the third largest brewery in the state. The company's main Production Brewery, which includes a recently reopened taproom, serves as the primary facility for brewing operations. Upland also operates The Wood Shop, a specialized sour ale brewery and event space, where its award-winning sour beers are crafted.

In addition to brewing, Upland Brewing Co. manages two Brewpubs and six Gastropubs, offering locally brewed beer and handcrafted food in a casual dining setting. The company also provides catering services, including full bar service for offsite events and complete dining and bar options for private events hosted at its locations.

Upland Brewing Co.'s beers, including ales, lagers, and sour beers, are distributed across all 92 counties in Indiana and nine other states, reflecting the company's growing reach within the craft beer industry.

== History ==
Upland Brewing Company was founded in 1998 by Marc Sattinger, Russ Levitt and Dean LaPlante. The brewery takes its name from the Indiana Uplands, a geographic region of southern Indiana, with Bloomington being near their northern terminus. In 1998, distribution of bottles and kegs began and the brewpub opened its doors. The brewpub began serving food the following year. Growing to be a Central Indiana staple, by 2004 its distribution had reached all 92 counties of Indiana. Upland Brewing was ranked as the state's second-largest microbrewery, producing 4,200 barrels in 2005.

Ownership changed in 2006 when Sattinger retired and sold the company to Douglas G. Dayhoff, an Indiana University graduate. The brewery installed a solar water-heating system in 2009, acting on an internal sustainability commitment supported with a grant from the Indiana Department of Energy. In late 2009 a second location known as the "Indy Tasting Room" opened in Indianapolis at 49th Street and College Avenue. By 2010, distribution had expanded to include ales and lagers throughout Indiana and in parts of Kentucky, Ohio, Illinois, and Wisconsin with small batch sour ales selling only through its tap room.

In 2012, a new brewing facility and bar was opened on the west side of Bloomington. This 37,000 square foot facility became the primary brewing facility for Upland, encompassing their everyday and seasonal lineup. The old brewery on 11th Street was scaled down to become a research and development site for Upland's growing Belgian-style sour and wild ale program. In 2013, Upland expanded further north with the addition of the Carmel Tap House, their second site to serve food. Dayhoff hired Indianapolis ad agency Young & Laramore to update the Upland logo, unveiled in 2014. In the summer of 2016, Upland opened a new restaurant location in Columbus. It is fixed in the old Columbus Pump House building downtown, giving it the name "The Pump House". Later that same year, Upland opened The Wood Shop to serve as the home for their sour ale production, located next door to the Bloomington Brewpub. Doug Dayhoff stepped down as president of Upland Brewing in 2017.

The Indy Tasting Room was renovated in 2018 and in 2019 saw a restaurant added on. The expanded space became known as 'Upland College Ave' due to its location at 49th & College Avenue. Upland's seventh location and fifth restaurant opened mid-2019 in the Fountain Square neighborhood and is known as 'Upland FSQ'. Upland FSQ features a graphic mural designed by Oregon artist Dustin Klein. Eddie DeSalle, previously a strategic consultant for Upland, was named president in July 2022. Upland opened a taproom location on 82nd Street in Indianapolis in December 2022, but did not renew its lease in 2026 and closed at the end of March that year.

== Beers ==
Upland Brewing produces seven year-round beers, a dozen rotating seasonal beers, tap-room exclusives, and a number of collaboration brews.

Beer Name	Style	ABV	IBU	Availability
Bad Elmer's Porter	Porter	6.0%	40	Year-round
Campside	Pale Ale	5.4%	35	Year-round
Champagne Velvet	Pilsener	5.5%	29	Year-round
Dragonfly IPA	IPA	6.7%	65	Year-round
Hoosier Gameday Lager	Lager	4.7%	25	Year-round
Juiced In Time	New England-Style IPA	6.5%	20	Year-round
Wheat Ale	Belgian Witbier	4.7%	15	Year-round

=== 1998–2009 ===
In 1998 when Upland Brewing opened, six beers were produced including Upland Wheat, a Belgian Witbier; Dragonfly IPA, India pale ale; and Bad Elmer's Porter. Upland Session Ale was released on July 4, 2002. Upland Brewing won their first medal in 2002 at the Great American Beer Festival, winning gold in the Herb and Spice Beer category with Upland Wheat. Later that year, Winter Warmer, a seasonal barley wine, was released. Upland Maibock, an amber lager, was released in spring 2003 in conjunction with a Maifest celebration. Upland released Upland Gold, a German-style Kölsch, for the summer of 2004. As part of an initiative sponsored by the Indiana Brewers Guild in July 2004, Upland released their version of Replicale, a pale ale made with two-row barley, crystal malts, liberty and Cascade hops, and first wort hops. For St. Patrick's Day 2007, Upland tapped Ard Ri ("Irish King"), an Imperial Irish-style red ale. Helios Pale Ale was released in 2009 to celebrate the installation of a solar water-heating system in Upland's brewery.

=== 2010–2019 ===
In 2012 Upland obtained the 1901 recipe to Champagne Velvet, a pre-prohibition pilsner and flagship brew of Terre Haute Brewing Company. Upland released Champagne Velvet for their 15th anniversary in 2013. In 2014 Upland released a series of small-batch brews under the Side Trail Series, starting with Coast Buster, an IPA. Coast Buster eventually won gold in the 2025 Indiana Brewers' Cup in the Strong American Ale category. Petal to the Kettle, a kettle-soured ale, was released in summer 2016 under the Side Trail Series. Upland released Latitude Adjustment, a tropical pale ale with pineapple and coconut, in late 2016 under the Side Trail Series. Latitude Adjustment was formerly known as Beard of Paradise. For their 20th anniversary in 2018, Upland re-released Preservation Pilsner, a lager featuring German ingredients, in partnership with Indiana Landmarks to bring awareness to endangered historic structures. After a 2018 wildfire in California, Upland Brewing collaborated with Switchyard Brewing Company to make Resilience IPA, a recipe given by Sierra Nevada Brewing Company with proceeds to aid the Camp Fire Relief Fund of California. Upland's Two of Tarts, a German-style sour beer with passion fruit and mango flavors, won gold in the gose category at the Great American Beer Festival in fall 2018. Upland's 2019 lineup included Soundbite IPA, a hazy New-England style brew released under the Side Trail series from March through April; Juiced In Time, another New England-Style IPA originally released in 2018 but brought back for year-round release; Life Exotic for the summer; Oktoberfest, a Bavarian lager, released August through October; and a winter seasonal beer. Breaking Away, a specialty ale made with lemon and ginger, was released in 2019. The can features a graphic mural designed by Oregon artis Dustin Klein, also used on the walls of the Upland FSQ location. The beer's name, Breaking Away, was inspired by the 1979 film about IU Bloomington's "Little 500" cycling race.

=== 2020–present ===
Indiana University Athletics announced Upland Brewing Company as the exclusive craft beer sponsor starting with the 2022–2023 season. Upland then released Hoosier Gameday Lager, an IU Hoosiers branded Vienna lager, at the 2023 football home opener against Ohio State University. The can featured "cream and crimson stripes" to match the team. The ad agency Young & Laramore (Y&L) refreshed Champagne Velvet's branding in October 2023. Later that year, Upland released an Indiana Pacers-branded canned beer, Courtside Indiana Pale Ale. The limited edition beer was first released November 19, 2023, against the Orlando Magic. After the Indiana Hoosiers won the College Football Championship in January 2026, Upland distributed 8,000 commemorative six-packs of Hoosier Gameday Lager across Indiana and the Chicagoland area. For the 250th anniversary of the signing of the Declaration of Independence in summer 2026, Upland collaborated with the Bochman Lab, a biochemistry lab at IU Bloomington headed by associate professor Matthew Bochman, to release Declaration of Fermentation. The beer was made from a colonial-era recipe with wild yeast collected from a 250-year-old Bloomington oak tree.

=== Sours ===
Upland Brewing sour production began in 2006. After trading a few cases of beer for a few wine barrels from Oliver Winery, they began their exploration into sour brewing. Sour Reserve was Upland's first sour beer. VinoSynth Red blended Sour Reserve and Malefactor, a red ale aged on Catawba grapes. VinoSynth White was Sour Reserve aged on Vidal Blanc grapes. Upland released Gilgamesh, a Flanders Red style beer, which was their strongest sour ale at 10.5% ABV in late 2011 and won gold in its category and runner-up for Best in Show at Chicago's Festival of Wood and Barrel Aged Beers in November of that year. By 2012 they were producing eight fruited lambics, an experimental sour called Dantalion Dark Wild Ale, Sour Reserve, and Gilgamesh. The Wood Shop, a brewery and taproom dedicated to sour ales, was opened in 2016.

- Midwest Sour Wild Funk Fest was Upland's annual festival celebrating beers fermented with wild bacteria and yeast hosted in Indianapolis in the spring. The first sour beer festival was held in Bloomington in May 2012 where Raspberry, Persimmon, and Blackberry lambic beers were released. The event featured approximately 50 breweries from across the world. Since 2017 the festival was held at the Mavris Arts & Event Center.

== Accolades ==
=== Awards ===
Year	Competition	Category	Style	Beer Entry	Place/Result	Ref.
2026	Indiana Brewers' Cup- Professional	Strong European Lager	Doppelbock	Desolator	1st, Gold	
2026	Indiana Brewers' Cup- Professional	American Wild Ale	Wild Specialty Beer	Pawpaw	1st, Gold	
2025	Indiana Brewers' Cup- Professional	Strong American Ale	Double IPA	Coastbuster	1st, Gold	
2024	Indiana Brewers' Cup- Professional	American Wild Ale	Wild Specialty Beer	Revive	2nd, Silver	
2024	Indiana Brewers' Cup- Professional	Fruit Beer	Fruit Beer	Two of Tarts	2nd, Silver	
2024	World Beer Cup	Belgian-Style Witbier	Wheat Ale	Upland Wheat	3rd, Bronze	
2023	Indiana Brewers' Cup- Professional	American Wild Ale	Wild Specialty Beer	Cherry	1st, Gold	
2022	Indiana Brewers' Cup- Professional	Pilsner	Pre-Prohibition Lager (Historical Beer)	Champagne Velvet	2nd, Silver	
2022	Indiana Brewers' Cup- Professional	Belgian Ale	Witbier	Wheat Ale	3rd, Bronze	
2022	Indiana Brewers' Cup- Professional	American Wild Ale	Wild Specialty Beer	Revive	1st, Gold	
2021	Indiana Brewers' Cup- Professional	Wood-Aged Beer	Specialty Wood-Aged	Hazelnut Bourbon Barrel Teddy Bear Kisses	1st, Gold	
2021	Indiana Brewers' Cup- Professional	Wood-Aged Beer	Wood-Aged Beer	Bourbon Barrel Teddy Bear Kisses	2nd, Silver	
2021	Indiana Brewers' Cup- Professional	American Wild Ale	Brett Beer	Uncoil	1st, Gold	
2021	Indiana Brewers' Cup- Professional	American Wild Ale	Wild Specialty Beer	Peach	2nd, Silver	
2020	Best of Craft Beer	American-Style Fruited Sour Ale	American-Style Fruited Sour Ale	Raspberry	3rd, Bronze	
2019	Great American Beer Festival (GABF)	Fruited Wood- and Barrel-Aged Sour Beer		Crimson Cherry Variant	2nd, Silver	
2018	Great American Beer Festival (GABF)	Gose		Two of Tarts	1st, Gold	
2018	World Beer Cup	American-Style Sour Ale		Raspberry	1st, Gold	
2014	Indiana Brewers' Cup- Professional	Brewery of the Year			Grand Champion	
2014	Indiana Brewers' Cup- Professional	Belgian and French Ale		VinoSynth Red	1st, Gold Best of Show	
2012	Great American Beer Festival (GABF)	Belgian-Style Lambic or Sour Ale		Sour Reserve	1st, Gold	
2011	Chicago's Festival of Wood and Barrel Aged Beers (FoBAB)	Best in Show		Gilgamesh	Runner-Up	
2011	Chicago's Festival of Wood and Barrel Aged Beers (FoBAB)	Wild Beer		Gilgamesh	1st, Gold	
2010	World Beer Cup	American-Style Amber Lager		Upland Oktoberfest	2nd, Silver	
2010	World Beer Cup	English-Style Summer Ale		Helios Pale Ale	3rd, Bronze	
2004	Indiana Brewers' Cup			Upland Chocolate Stout	1st, Gold	
2003	Indiana Brewers' Cup			Upland Valley Weizen	1st, Gold	
2003	Indiana Brewers' Cup			Dragonfly IPA	1st, Gold	
2003	Indiana Brewers' Cup			Upland Wheat	2nd, Silver	
2003	Indiana Brewers' Cup			Bad Elmer's Porter	2nd, Silver	
2003	Indiana Brewers' Cup			Upland Amber	3rd, Bronze	
2003	Indiana Brewers' Cup			Upland Pale Ale	3rd Bronze	
2003	Great American Beer Festival (GABF)	Bitter		Upland Pale Ale	2nd, Silver	
2002	Great American Beer Festival (GABF)	Herb and Spice Beer		Upland Wheat Ale	1st, Gold	

== References in media ==
=== Film and television ===
- Upland Brewing Co. supplied beer bottles and pint glasses for props on NBC's Parks and Recreation to give authenticity to the fictional Pawnee, Indiana town.

=== Sports ===
- January 2026 - Indiana football head coach Curt Cignetti replied to a post-National Championship press conference question to what was his after game beer, "Hoosier beer, from Upland Brewery..."

== See also ==
- Beer in the United States
- List of breweries in Indiana

== Further resources ==
- Johnson, Anita and Douglas A. Wissing. Hoosier Hospitality: Craft Beer. [Bloomington, Ind.]: WFIU, 2011.
- Kohn, Rita T. and Kris Arnold. True Brew: A Guide to Craft Beer in Indiana. Bloomington: Quarry Books/Indiana University Press, 2010.
