= Three Floyds Brewing =

Craft brewery in Munster, Indiana

- Industry: Alcoholic beverage
- Founded: 1996
- Headquarters: 9750 Indiana Parkway; Munster, Indiana; 41°32′08.1″N 87°31′00.0″W
- Key people: Nick Floyd (Owner); Chris Boggess (Brewmaster)
- Products: Beer
- Production output: 20,000 (in 2011)
- Website: www.3floyds.com

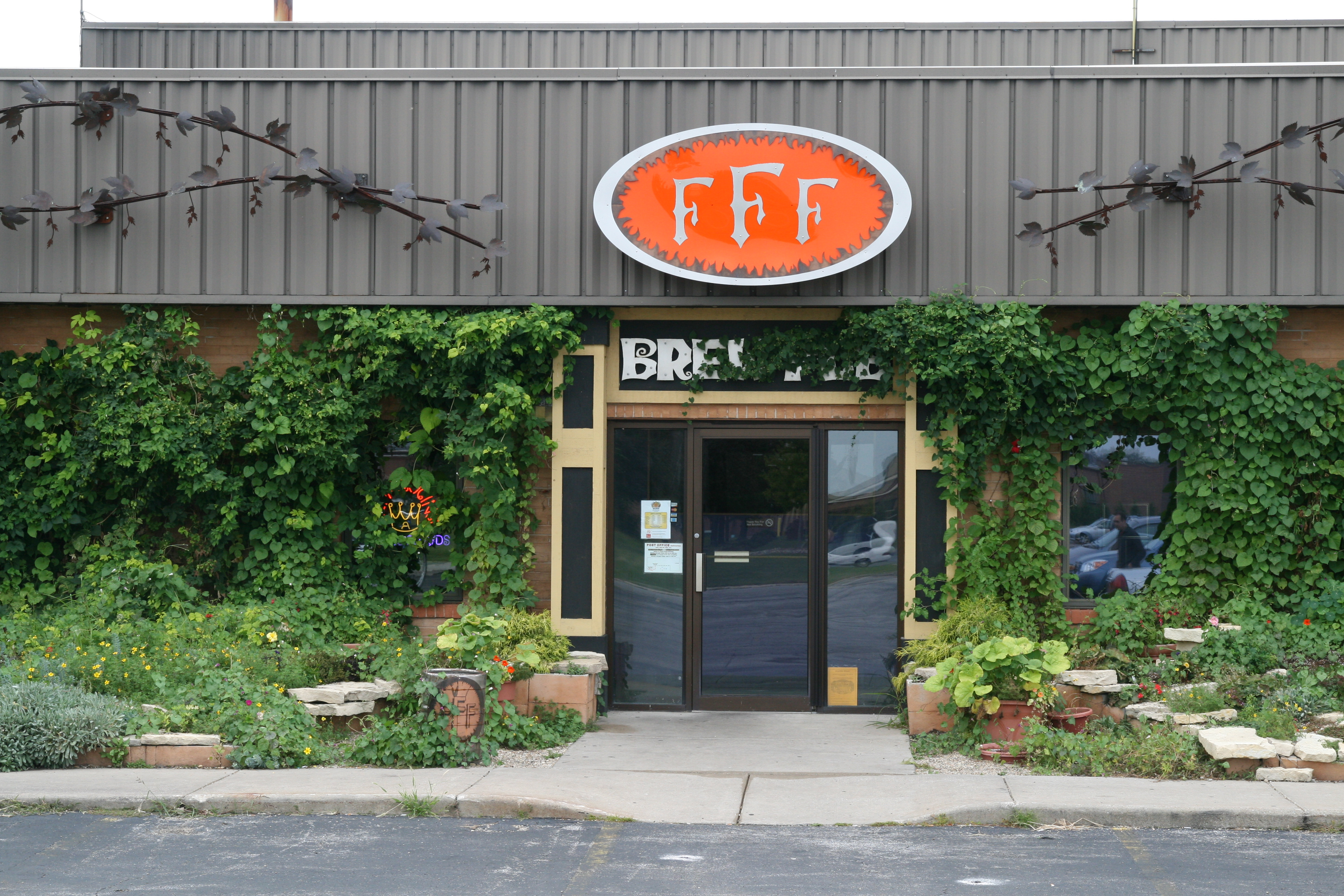
Three Floyds Brewpub in 2008

Three Floyds Brewing (3 Floyds) is a brewery founded in 1996 by brothers Nick and Simon and their father Mike Floyd in Hammond, Indiana. Since 2000, the brewery has been located in Munster, Indiana. In 2011, an article in The Washington Post said that Three Floyds "has won over the beer geek elite", and "has been making the best beers on the planet for four of the past five years—at least according to the more than 1 million beer reviews logged each year on RateBeer.com. (In 2008, it slipped to second place.)"

In 2018, Three Floyds cracked the top 50 list of Brewing companies by sales volume reaching the #39 spot in craft brewery sales and #49 spot in overall brewery sales. By 2026, Three Floyds had expanded distribution to 22 states.

== History ==
Nick, Simon, and Mike Floyd opened Three Floyds Brewing in 1996 in Hammond, Indiana operating out of an old auto garage. The original brewing system was made of a Canfield's cola tank with wok burners and Swiss cheese fermenters salvaged from Wisconsin. The three purchased a warehouse in Munster in 2000 to house the brewery. Three Floyds opened a brewpub adjacent to the brewery in 2005. By 2012 Three Floyds was producing 10,000 barrels per year. In 2014 it was announced that plans for a distillery were in the works across the street from the brewery. The distillery would produce gin, rum, vodka and other spirits for sale and tasting. The distillery opened on June 21, 2019.

In 2018 plans were unveiled for the expansion of Three Floyds 57,000 sq. ft. facility to a larger, campus-like setting with a bigger brewpub, retail area, office space and parking, as well as a larger brewing facility. Construction was set to begin after Dark Lord Day 2019. The brewpub closed in 2020. Three Floyds made plans in 2023 to open a Taproom at their Munster location in 2024, expanding to over 136,000 sq. ft. and enlarging the retail and office spaces.

Co-founder Simon Floyd died on December 19, 2024, in Dyer, Indiana.

== Beers ==
Three Floyds produces more than a dozen year-round beers as well as numerous seasonal beers.

Year-Round Beers
Beers	Style	ABV	IBU
Alpha King	American Pale Ale	6.66%	68
Arctic Panzer Wolf	India Pale Ale	9%	100
Barbarian Haze	Hazy IPA	6.5%	50
Dreadnaught IPA	Imperial India Pale Ale	9.5%	100
Gumballhead	Wheat Beer	5.6%	35
Lazersnake	Pale Ale	7%	55
Permanent Funeral	India Pale Ale	10.5%	100
Robert The Bruce	Scottish Ale	6.5%	24
Space Station Middle Finger	American Pale Ale	6%	50
Zombie Dust	Pale Ale	6.2%	50

Three Floyds's flagship beer was Alpha King, an American Pale Ale that follows German beer laws. Dark Lord, a Russian Imperial Stout brewed with coffee, Mexican vanilla, and Indian sugar, was first brewed in 2002. They began making Zombie Dust, an American pale ale, in 2010 using Citra hops. The cans feature horror-style artwork by Tim Seely. By 2012 they were producing Dark Lord in thee variations (standard, oak aged, vanilla-bean barrel aged), Alpha King pale ale, Behemoth barley wine, and Dreadnaught India pale ale. Seasonal beers included Rabbid Rabbit, Moloko milk stout, Broo Doo harvest ale, Topless Wytch Baltic porter, and Apocalypse Cow. Three Floyds Released Turbo Reaper, a 7% ABV West Coast IPA in 2024. In 2025, Three Floyds released Blinded By The Light, a lager made with corn grits, referencing the song of the same name.

=== Dark Lord and Dark Lord Day ===
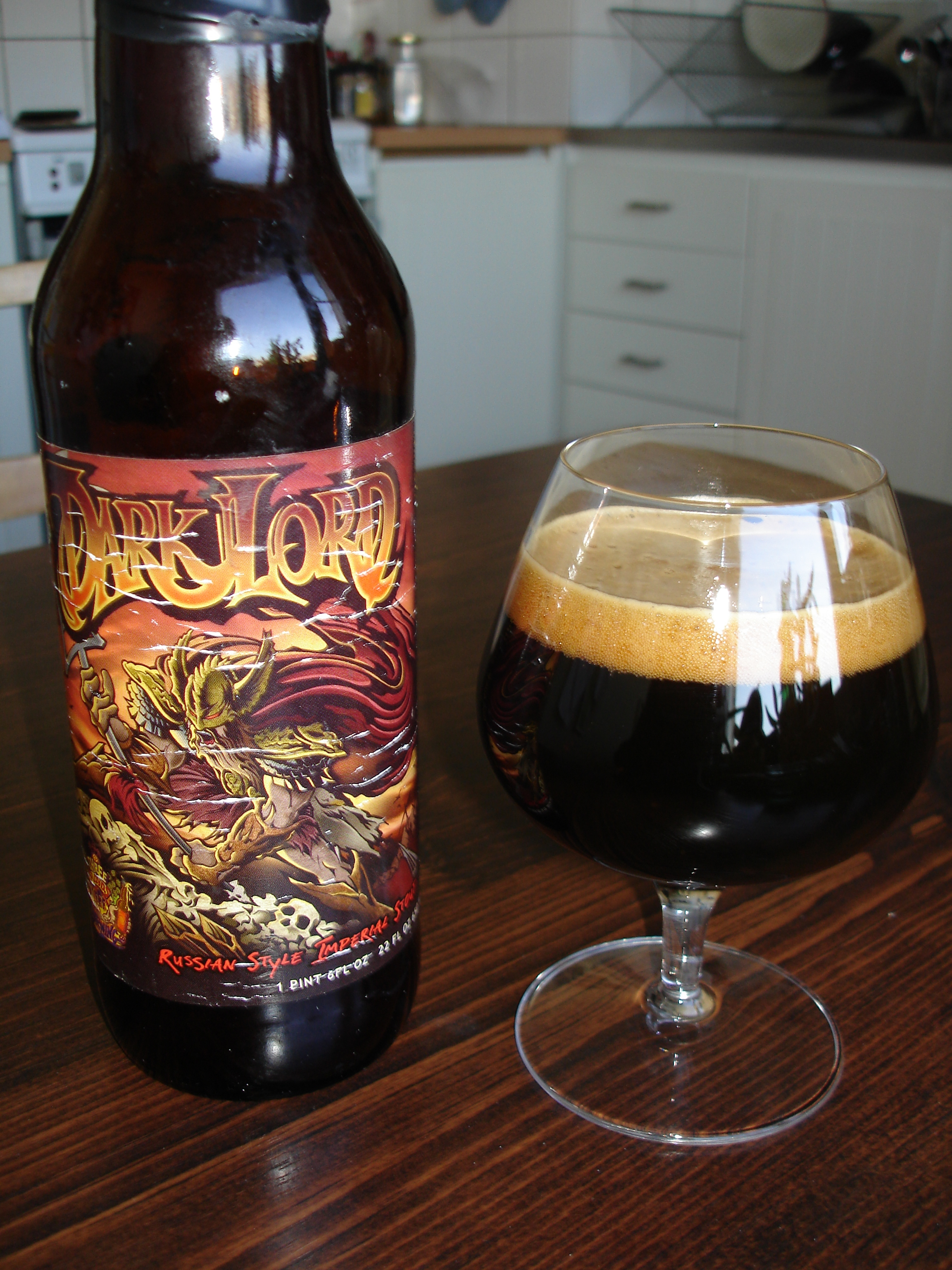
Dark Lord beer

Three Floyd's Dark Lord is the brewery's premier barrel-aged beer. Purchasing a bottle of Dark Lord requires attendance to the brewery's annual "Dark Lord Day" festival which regularly features beer exchanges, heavy metal music and food trucks. A ticket nets attendees four bottles of Dark Lord and a fifth variant flavor of Dark Lord. Attendance at this event is now limited to 6,000 via pre-sold tickets, after crowd control problems in the past. As of 2018, Dark Lord sits as one of the top 100 beers in the world according to RateBeer.com.

=== Collaborations with heavy metal bands ===
In 2010, the brewers teamed up with heavy metal band Pelican to brew The Creeper, a doppelbock made in recognition of the band's 10th anniversary. Since then, the brewery has collaborated with several other heavy metal bands, including Mastodon, Skeletonwitch, Exodus, Cannibal Corpse, Amon Amarth, and Pig Destroyer.

== Accolades ==
=== Awards ===
Year	Competition	Category	Style	Beer Entry	Place/Result	Ref.
2026	World Beer Cup	American-Style Lager		Floyds Deluxe	1st, Gold	
2024	World Beer Cup	English Ale		Gumballhead	3rd, Bronze	
2023	USA Today Readers' Choice Awards	Fall Seasonal Beer	Harvest Ale	Broo Doo	2nd, Runner-Up	
2019	RateBeer	Best Beer (Indiana)	Russian Imperial Stout	Dark Lord		
2017	RateBeer Best Brewers in the World	Top 100				
2016	World Beer Cup	American-Style Imperial Stout		Blot Out the Sun	1st, Gold	
2010	World Beer Cup	Imperial Red Ale		Behemoth	1st, Gold	
2008	World Beer Cup			Behemoth	1st, Gold	
2008	World Beer Cup			Dreadnaught	3rd, Bronze	
2007	World Beer Cup			Gorch Fock	2nd, Silver	

== Other media ==
- In 2018, comics writer Brian Azzarello teamed up with the brewery to produce a series of comics produced by Image Comics featuring characters based on Three Floyds beers including the Alpha King.
- Gumballhead the Cat – a punk, anthropomorphic cat – is the namesake of Three Floyds Gumballhead wheat ale. The fictional feline has his own webcomic, which is written and drawn by Rob Syers, who also created the artwork for the beer packaging.

== See also ==
- List of breweries in Indiana
- Beer in the United States
- Barrel-aged beer

== Further resources ==
- Wissing, Douglas A. Indiana: One Pint at a Time Indianapolis: Indiana Historical Society, 2010.
