= Old Crown Brewing Corporation =

Defunct American brewery

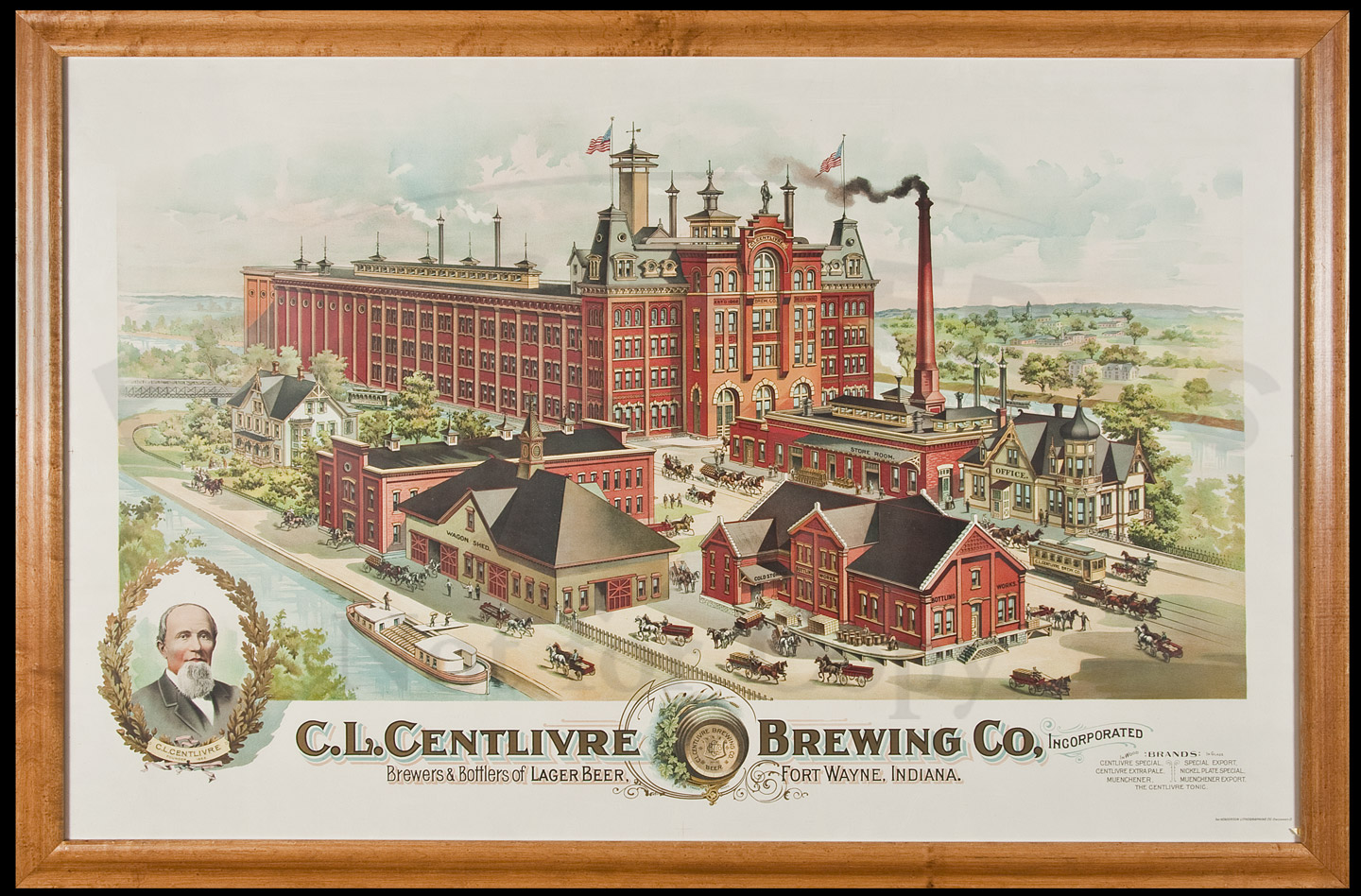
- Early poster of the Centlivre Brewery
- Location: Fort Wayne, Indiana, US
- Opened: 1862
- Closed: 1973
- Key people: C. L. Centlivre (founder); Frank Centlivre (founder)

Old Crown Brewing Corporation was an American brewery, founded as The French Brewery in 1862 by Charles L. Centlivre, in Fort Wayne, Indiana.

== History ==
Charles Louis Centlivre (September 27, 1827, Dannemarie – 1894) trained as a cooper in France and came to the United States in 1847, settling in New Orleans, Louisiana. After a cholera epidemic, he returned to France before returning to America via New York City with his father and two brothers. After living in Massillon, Ohio, and working as a cooper in nearby Louisville, he founded a brewery in McGregor, Iowa, in 1850 and operated it until he came to Fort Wayne, Indiana in 1862. He originally founded the French Brewery in Fort Wayne in 1862, but after it burned down in the summer of 1889 he reopened as Centlivre Brewing in December 1890. The company was renamed C. L. Centlivre Brewing Company by his brother, Frank, after Charles death. Several generations of both the Centlivre and Reuss families, who were related by marriage, ran the operation during the 19th and early-to-mid 20th centuries. During prohibition the company shifted to cold storage and ice industries, operating under Centlivre Ice & Cold Storage Company starting in 1917. The company incorpated as Centlivre Brewing again in 1933.

The company adopted the Old Crown name when they merged with Chris-Craft Industries for a short time in 1962. Chris-Craft later sold the company to its employees. Old Crown produced Old Crown Beer, Old Crown Ale, Old Crown Bock, Van Merrit, Old German, Renner and Alps Brau, until they ceased production on December 1, 1973. Peter Hand Brewing of Chicago continued to make Old Crown beer and ale, as well as Van Merrit, Old German and Alps Brau, until the late 1980s.

In 1950, the brewery underwent a million dollar renovation, with updated equipment, specialized equipment for distilling hop oil, a more efficient production process, new brewing technology, called "Smootherizing", much expanded capacity, and a large new production facility that dwarfed the original brewery, which was attached to it, forcing the city to cut a fairly sharp curve into Spy Run Avenue to accommodate the large new building. Plans to turn the old brewery into a historic site were dashed by vandalism during the 1970s. Hopes to utilize the remaining buildings were never realized, with the last of the brewery demolished in 1989. Only the Centlivre home and horse stables were saved.

The statue of C. L. Centlivre that stood atop the original brewery now stands above the entrance to Halls Gas House, a local eatery. It once blew down from the brewery during a wind storm in 1964. In the early to mid-20th century, there was a minor league baseball team in Fort Wayne called The Centlivre Beers. In town, there was a Centlivre trolley that went past the brewery on its regular run and would deliver beer to customers' homes if they ordered by phone.

The Centlivres built a well for the St. Vincent's orphanage on Wells Street.

== Brands ==
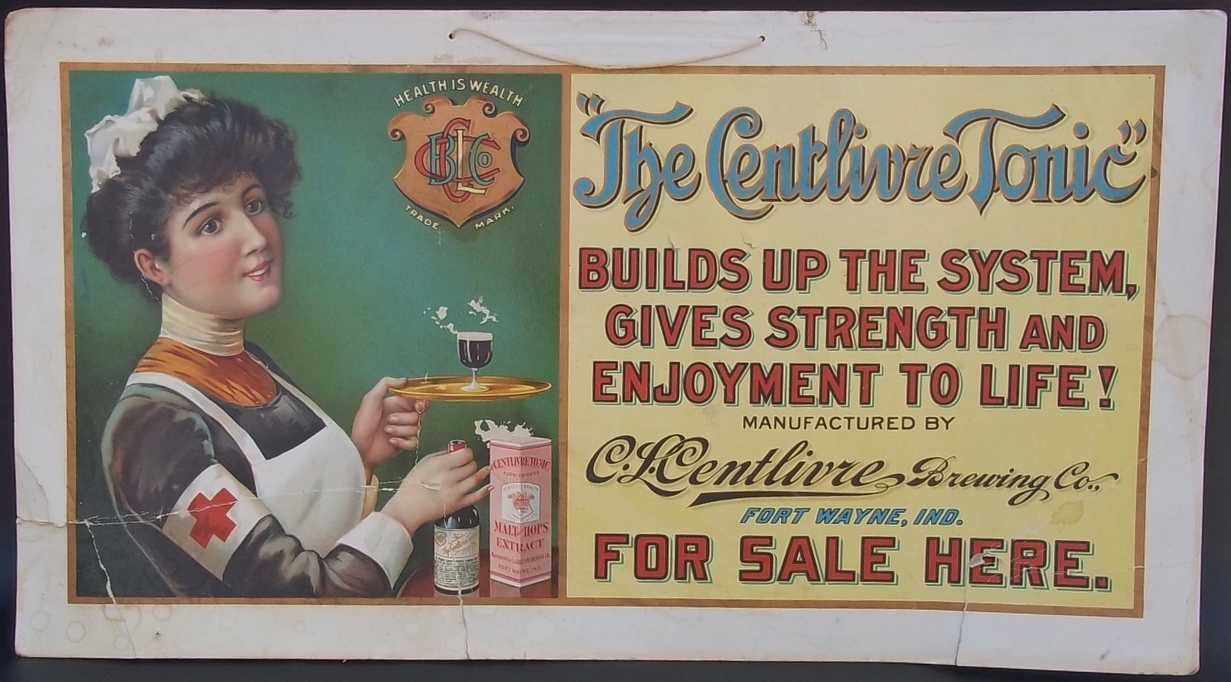
Advertisement for The Centlivre Tonic, a bock beer.

The brewery's best-known brand was Old Crown, a renaming of their earlier Centlivre brand. Prior to Prohibition, brands included Nickel Plate beer, Muechener, the Centlivre Beer and the Centlivre Tonic, among others. Nickel Plate beer was brewed by the C.L. Centlivre Brewing Company in partnership with the Nickel Plate Road starting in the 1890s and was served in its dining cars until the 1950s. During Prohibition they produced a near beer called That's It, and briefly revived the old Centlivre brand after Prohibition, before introducing Old Crown, which quickly became their flagship brand. After prohibition, Nickel Plate was produced again for draft and bottling using the pre-prohibition recipe. Old Crown produced Renner Golden Amber Beer, as well as Old German, Old Oxford and Kings Brew under the "Renner Brewing Co." name, for sale in Ohio. In 1946 the Centilivre Brewing Corporation filed a suit against Indianapolis Brewing Company. IBC obtained a trademark for the name "Crown Select" beer and Centilivre demanded $50,000 in damages over concerns for their trademarked "Old Crown" beer.

Another Fort Wayne brewery, Hoff-Brau, was a joint venture between the Centlivre and Berghoff operations. Early Hoff-Brau labels show both the Centlivre crown and the Berghoff eagle above the brand name. Hoff-Brau and Hoff-Brau Gold Star were produced at the Berghoff facility, and production of the brand ceased when the Berghoff brewery closed in the mid-1950s, eventually selling the physical plant to Falstaff, which operated it until the early 1990s.

== Advertising ==
During World War II, the 'Lazy Aged' man began appearing in Old Crown ads sleeping on a cloud, wearing a pointed hat, pointed shoes and festive clothes, sometimes with a spiderweb to put an exclamation point on his laziness. He would later appear on the side of Old Crown Beer and Bock cans, but not Ale, which would only have the words "Lazy Aged' on the label. The term "Lazy Aged" was used to refer to the extensive aging of their products "to the peak of flavor perfection." In the case of Old Crown Bock, this was four months, from November to March, when it would go on sale. Other characters included a pre-Prohibition character with a resemblance to the later Lazy Aged guy, the elf-like Little Nick who symbolized Nickel Plate beer. There was also 'Quartsie,' a talking 32-ounce bottle, and 'Crownie,' a character dressed like a waiter with crown-like eyebrows who appeared briefly on Old Crown beer cans, promotional items and advertisements in the early 1960s.

Alps Brau was touted on the radio as "Very Bavarian, Very Bavarian, Very Bavarian Beer" in radio jingles by a local musical act, Nancy Lee and The Hilltoppers.

During the 1950s, Old Crown Ale was sold in multi-colored cans on several occasions. These red, gold, blue, yellow, green and purple cans are extremely rare today. Around this time, the Old Crown label changed from the red, black and gold, gothic design they had been using since the 1930s, to a simpler, more modern style: ted, white and gold for beer and green and silver for ale. The new design lasted, with occasional minor changes, until the brewery closed in 1973.

== See also ==
- List of breweries in Indiana
- List of defunct breweries in the United States
