= Indiana Uplands =

Geographical region in south-central Indiana

Coordinates: 38°45′N 86°30′W

The Indiana Uplands or the Hoosier Uplands are a geographical region in south-central Indiana. On a topographical map the Indiana Uplands begin slightly north of the city of Martinsville, Indiana and continue south to the Ohio River. The description of the region inspired the name of Upland Brewing Company. The region's approximate boundaries are Interstate 65 to the east and U.S. Route 231 to the west. The Uplands are characterized by terrain varying from rolling hills to cliffs, sharp rugged hills and valleys. Nearly all of these hills are composed of sandstone, limestone, and siltstone from West to east. The siltstone hills are the most rugged followed by the sandstone while the limestone are the smoothest. This is contrast to the Tipton Till Plain immediately to the north in central Indiana, which features flat to gently rolling landscape. Interstates 64 and 69 pass through this rugged section of the state with sections of both cut deep into the rock and others towering over the treetops. Overall, the Indiana Uplands have the same basic characteristics of the Pennyrile Region and the Highland Rim and are the northernmost extent of the range.

== Ecoregions ==
The Indiana Uplands include the following ecoregions:

- Norman Upland. The easternmost portion of the Indiana Uplands.
- Mitchell Plain. Located between the Norman and Crawford Uplands.
- Crawford Uplands. The western portion of the Indiana Uplands.
