= Indiana wine =

Indiana
- Wine region
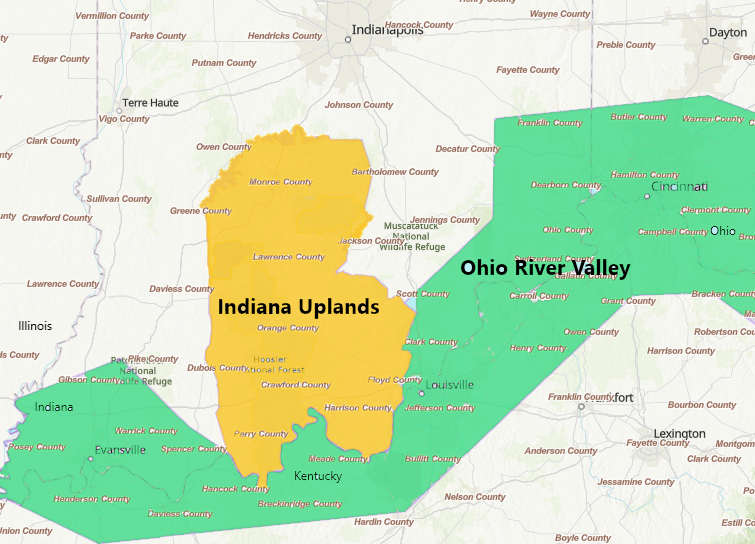
- Indiana AVAs
- Official name: State of Indiana
- Type: U.S. State Appellation
- Year established: 1816
- Country: United States
- Sub-regions: Indiana Uplands AVA, Ohio River Valley AVA
- Growing season: 170-175 days
- Climate region: Region III-IV
- Heat units: 3,318–3,541 GDD
- Precipitation (annual average): 35 to 45 in (890–1,140 mm)
- Total area: 22.93 million acres (35,826 sq mi)
- Size of planted vineyards: 270 acres (110 ha)
- No. of vineyards: 30
- Grapes produced: Aurore, Baco noir, Cabernet Franc, Cabernet Sauvignon, Catawba, Cayuga, Chambourcin, Chardonel, Chardonnay, Concord, Geisenheim, Gewürztraminer, Leon Millot, Marechal Foch, Merlot, Muscat Canelli, Niagara, Pinot gris, Pinot noir, Riesling, Sauvignon blanc, Seyval blanc, St. Vincent, Steuben, Traminette, Vidal blanc, Vignoles, Villard blanc, Viognier
- No. of wineries: 32

Indiana wine refers to wine made from grapes grown in the U.S. state appellation of Indiana. Wine has been produced in the region since the early days of European colonization in the 18th century. In the mid-19th century, Indiana was the tenth-largest winegrape producing state in the country. There are two American Viticultural Areas (AVA) in Indiana, the multi-state Ohio River Valley AVA which also expands across Kentucky and Ohio, and the Indiana Uplands AVA located entirely within south-central Indiana and resident of the state's oldest and most prolific winery since 1972, Oliver Winery.

Indiana wineries produced 36,000 US gallons (136,275 L) of wine in 1989. By 2006 that number had increased to 750,000 US gallons (2,839,059 L). Indiana wine production then increased from 1,185,132 US gallons (4,486,213 L) in 2012 to 6,685,484 US gallons (25,307,310 L) in 2025. Wineries in Indiana generated $74.8 million in revenue in 2026, ranking the state 15th out of 50 states in total wine industry revenue.

== History ==
Indiana was a crucial area in the early American wine industry. Early attempts at grape cultivation were mainly undertaken by English immigrants, which were all unsuccessful in the production of palatable wine. French vinedressers were blamed for intentionally causing this failure even though this was not the case. French cultivation of grapes started in what would be present-day Indiana by 1735. Reasons that wine production failed in this era included the inability to use native grapes which were too bitter and produced less fruit), the lack of mature vineyards, diseases that non-native grapes were especially weak to, and a colder climate compared to Europe. Vineyards were abandoned for tobacco, which was a more profitable crop. More serious attempts to produce wine took place after the American Revolution but these efforts were also unsuccessful.

After Prohibition, sales by wineries in Indiana were difficult. William Oliver, founder of Oliver Winery, played an instrumental role in creating and passing the 1971 Small Winery Act which allowed direct sale of wine to the public. The bill was introduced on January 28, 1971, as H. B. 1465. After the passage of this law, wineries could produce up to 100,000 US gallons (378,541 L) per year to sell for retail and wholesale.

The Indiana General Assembly passed a law in 2006 preventing small wineries from skipping wholesalers and selling directly to retailers. The law came after the U.S. Supreme Court ruled that states that allowed in-state wineries to ship directly to consumers had to allow out-of-state wineries to do the same. Indiana's Alcohol and Tobacco Commission therefore banned all direct shipping to customers. This had a detrimental effect on many small wineries, forcing some to close.

In 2011 and 2019 the Purdue Wine Grape Team advocated for Traminette to be considered Indiana's state wine "due to its outstanding quality and versatility."

== Wineries in Indiana ==
As of 2026, there are 89 winery establishments in Indiana, ranking Indiana 14th for the number of industry establishments within the US.

- Country Heritage Winery - LaOtto - 2026 Indiana Winery of the Year
- Huber Orchard and Winery - Starlight/Borden - cultivating grapes since 1843
- Oliver Winery - Bloomington - opened in 1972, is the largest winery in Indiana
- Two EE's Winery - Huntington - 2025 Indiana Winery of the Year

== Further resources ==
- Butler, James; Butler, John (2001). Indiana Wine: A History. Indiana University Press. ISBN 978-0-253-00058-3.

== See also ==
- American wine
- List of breweries in Indiana
