= Kentucky wine =

Wine from Kentucky

Kentucky
- Wine region
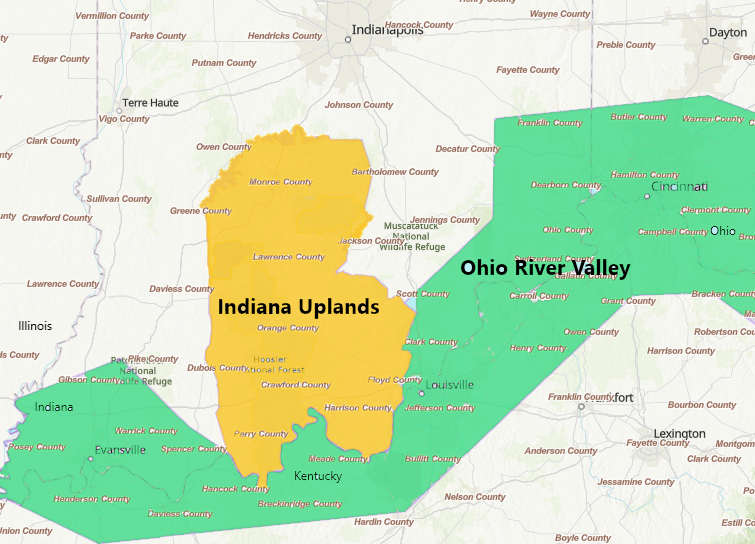
- Kentucky AVAs
- Official name: Commonwealth of Kentucky
- Type: U.S. State Appellation
- Year established: 1792
- Country: United States
- Sub-regions: Indiana Uplands AVA, Ohio River Valley AVA
- Climate region: Humid subtropical/continental
- Total area: 25.3 million acres (39,486 sq mi)
- Grapes produced: Cabernet Franc, Cabernet Sauvignon, Carlos, Catawba, Cayuga, Chambourcin, Chardonel, Chardonnay, Concord, De Chaunac, Marechal Foch, Merlot, Munson, Niagara, Norton, Riesling, Seyval blanc, Traminette, Vidal blanc
- No. of wineries: 28

Kentucky wine refers to wine made from grapes grown in the U.S. commonwealth of Kentucky. About 65 wineries operate commercially in Kentucky, with most recent plantings focusing on Cabernet Sauvignon, Chardonnay, and Cabernet Franc. Kentucky produced over two million US gallons (7,570,824 L) of wine in 2011 and is the largest wine-producing state by volume in the American South. Kentucky passed legislation in 1976 allowing wineries to operate, and tobacco settlement funds have provided Kentucky farmers the opportunity to once again explore grapes as a cash crop.

== History ==
One of the first attempts at large-scale commercial viticulture in the United States started in Kentucky in 1799, with plantings by the Kentucky Vineyard Society. The relatively mild climate of Kentucky, especially in the Ohio River Valley, made Kentucky an attractive place for early American winemaking. By the mid-19th century, Kentucky was the third largest wine-producing state in the country. Prohibition in the United States destroyed the wine industry in Kentucky, and the state took a long time to recover after the Repeal in 1933. It was not until 1976, a state law allowed farm wineries to operate and new vineyards and wineries soon followed.
