= Thieme and Wagner Brewing Company =

Brewery in Indiana, United States

Coordinates: 40.419231°N 86.889061°W

- Type: Privately held company
- Industry: Alcoholic beverage
- Founded: 1863, 2016
- Headquarters: Lafayette, Indiana
- Website: http://thiemeandwagner.com/

The Thieme and Wagner Brewing Company is a brewery in Lafayette, Indiana.

== History ==
Thieme and Wagner Brewing Company was founded in 1863 by Frederick August Thieme and John Wagner, both of whom were immigrants from Germany. The brewery was located at the corner of 4th and Union Streets. At its height, the brewery was producing 100,000 barrels of beer annually and was the 6th largest brewery in Indiana. The brewery lasted until 1918, when Prohibition forced it to become The National Fruit Juice Company, which produced near beer in addition to an apple drink called Apella. The family made the decision to not lay off a single employee after the wake of Prohibition. This high payroll and a rise in the price of ingredients caused the company to sell out to the Valentine Blatz Brewing Co. They used nearly all of the money from the sale to pay back their business debt.

With the repeal of Prohibition, Lafayette Brewing Inc. moved into the old Thieme & Wagner brewery and produced their own take on T & W's famous Ye Tavern Brew. Lafayette Brewery Inc. closed down around 1940. This operation closed in 1960 a victim of all the consolidation in the brewing industry during this time. In 1963, the city of Lafayette tore down the Thieme & Wagner Brewing complex in order to build the Harrison bridge.

The Thieme and Wagner Brewing Company have since been resurrected by the 5th and 6th generation father and son duo of Brian and David Thieme. This operation is located at 652 Main Street Lafayette, Indiana. David is brewing traditional German-American lagers on the 1-Bbl brewsystem in the basement. Upstairs their cozy taproom features their brews, a full bar, and light pub fare.

In the summer of 2017, David fulfilled his quest to find the missing recipe from his ancestors brewery. Through Ancestry he found Boonie Ramsey (Haas), the great-granddaughter of William Haas, the Thieme & Wagner Brewmaster from the early 1900s. She graciously shared with David the contents of his brewing journal, which contained the recipes to Ye Tavern Brew and the infamous Bock Beer. David brews and sells the Bock beer recipe at his taproom.

== See also ==
- Beer in the United States
- List of breweries in Indiana
