= South Bend Brewing Association =

- U.S. National Register of Historic Places
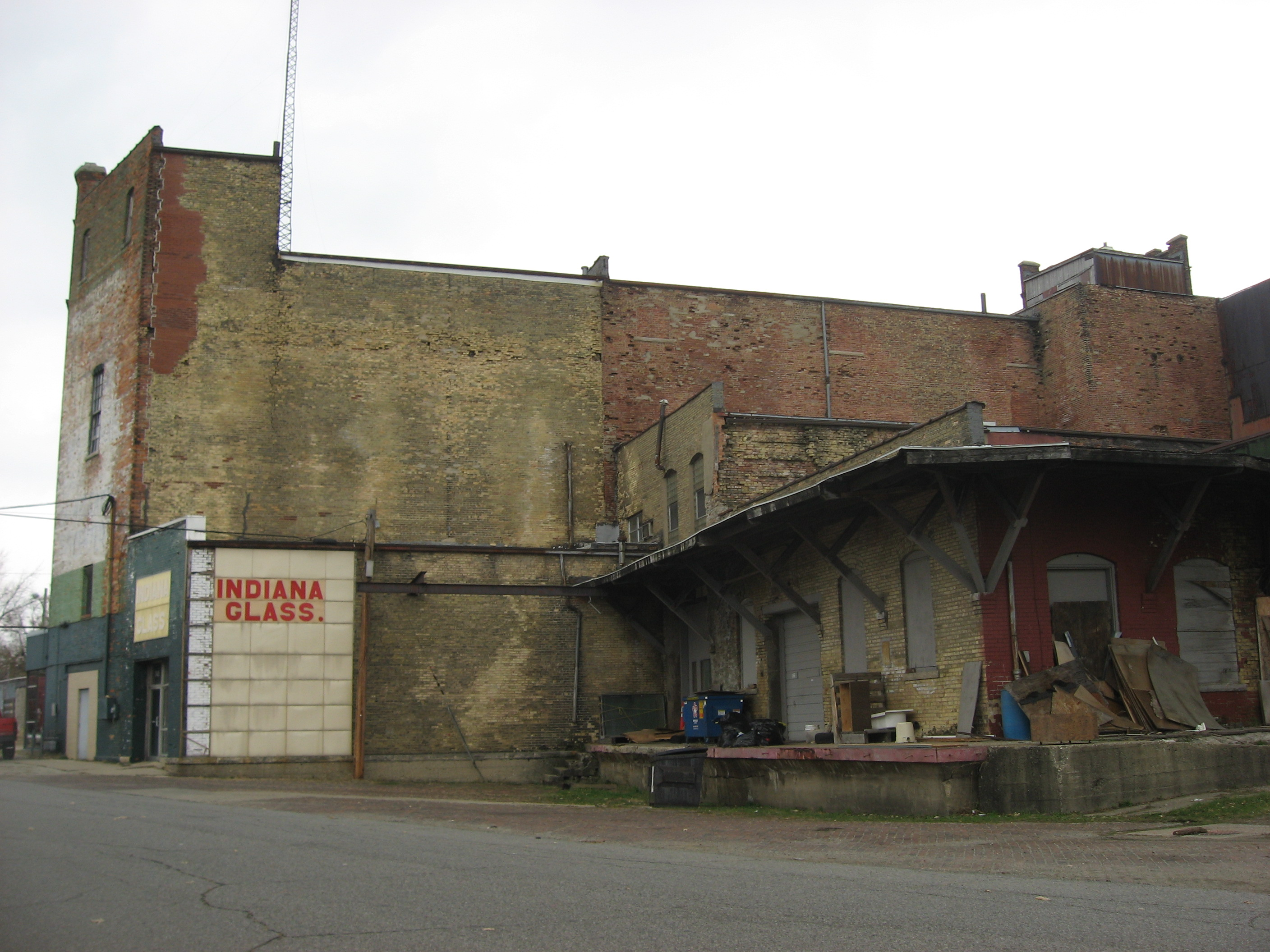
- South Bend Brewing Association, November 2013

- Location within Indiana Location within the United States
- Location: 1636 Lincolnway West, South Bend, Indiana
- Coordinates: 41°41′8″N 86°16′32″W
- Area: 2.2 acres (0.89 ha)
- Built: 1905, 1910
- Architectural style: Late 19th And Early 20th Century American Movements
- NRHP reference No.: 01000987
- Added to NRHP: September 16, 2001

South Bend Brewing Association is a historic brewery complex located at South Bend, Indiana. The main plant was built in 1905, and is a large, irregularly shaped brick building with a four-story section. It features square corner towers and a crenellated parapet. A one-story, glass paneled storefront was added in the 1950s. A separate bottling works building was constructed in 1910.

It was listed on the National Register of Historic Places in 2001.

== History ==
In 1903 local tavern owners joined to produce and distribute beer, incorporating South Bend Brewing on June 4, 1903. Ground broke on the South Bend Brewing Association building on July 23, 1903 and opened in 1905. Rather than a multi-generational family business, like other large breweries, the brewing company was a publicly owned consortium offering stock to the public. The building featured power electricity, heating and cooling, and loading docks. A bottling facility was built to the west across College Street in 1910 and a tunnel to house the pipes lead from the tanks to the bottling machines. After the 1919 Volstead Act was passed, George Voedisch became President of the company and renamed it to South Bend Beverage and Ice Association in 1922 when they began producing non-alcoholic beverages, near beer, candy, ice cream, denatured alcohol, and ice.

In the 1930s an L-shaped portion was added to the building. After prohibition ended, the company returned to brewing beer, producing up to 50,000 barrels per year. Production declined during World War II, in part due to a federal excise tax on barrels brewed. They continued to produce ice as Polar Ice and Fuel, but the brewery closed in November 1950.

== Beers ==
Before prohibition, South Bend Brewing Association produced Tiger Expert bock and Hoosier Beer. The South Bend Brewing Association advertised a Hoosier Cream beer in 1904. During prohibition, the company produced non-alcoholic beverages Hoosier Root Beer and Hoosier Sweet Cider, a thrice filtered cider. After prohibition, the South Bend Brewing company advertised Hoosier Bock Beer.

== Advertising ==
In the late 1930s the South Bend Brewing Company sponsored a number of radio programs including "The Hoosier Beer Baseball Review," a daily program featuring scores and play highlights for major and minor league teams on WFAM, the South Bend Tribune's broadcasting station. They also sponsored the "Hoosier Beer Football Forecast" in the fall and the "Hoosier Beer Sports Review" during the winter months.

== See also ==
- National Register of Historic Places listing in Indiana
- Beer in the United States
- List of breweries in Indiana
