= Kanawha River Valley AVA =

American Viticultural Area in West Virginia

Coordinates: 38°49′38″N 81°43′24″W

Kanawha River Valley
- Wine region
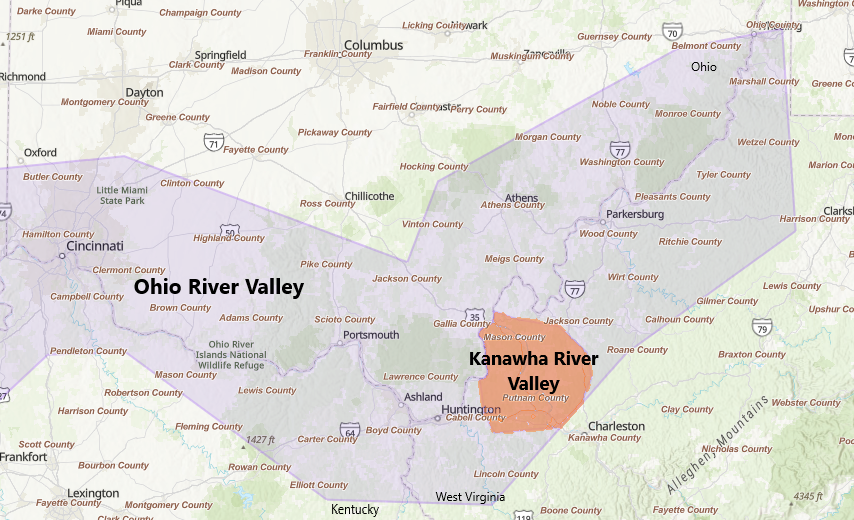
- Type: American Viticultural Area
- Year established: 1986
- Years of wine industry: 200
- Country: United States
- Part of: West Virginia, Ohio River Valley AVA
- Growing season: 150–185 days
- Climate region: Continental
- Precipitation (annual average): 43.5 in (1,100 mm)
- Soil conditions: Shale, siltstone and some limestone of Permian and Pennsylvanian Age
- Total area: 640,000 acres (1,000 sq mi)
- Size of planted vineyards: 14 acres (5.7 ha)
- No. of wineries: 1

Kanawha River Valley is an American Viticultural Area (AVA) located within the Kanawha River Valley watershed in West Virginia, between the city of Charleston and adjacent to the Ohio border. It was established as the nation's 85^{th} and the state's second appellation on April 8, 1986 by the Bureau of Alcohol, Tobacco and Firearms (ATF), Treasury after reviewing the petition submitted by Dr. Wilson Ward, owner of Fisher Ridge Vineyard, a winery located in Liberty, WV, proposing the viticultural area to be known as "Kanawha River Valley." The only wine appellation located entirely within the state's borders encompasses 640,000 acres (1,000 sq mi) throughout portions of Cabell, Jackson, Kanawha, Mason and Putnam Counties. A portion of the viticultural area's western boundary follows the Ohio River and runs adjacent to the West Virginia-Ohio state border in a southwesterly direction. Kanawha River Valley viticultural area is a sub-appellation in the multi-state Ohio River Valley AVA. The first commercial winery in the state and the AVA, Fisher Ridge, began operation in 1979.

== History ==
The name "Kanawha" (/kəˈnɔːə/ kuh-NAW-uh) is derived from the local Canawagh, or Kanawha, indigenous people, who settled along the river. The river was named "Kanawha" on the earliest survey maps when George Washington owned property on the land now known as the Kanawha River Valley. The Kanawha River is formed by the confluence of the New River and the Gauley River and flows approximately 97 miles (156 km) in a northwesterly direction to a point where it flows into the Ohio River at Point Pleasant, West Virginia. Kanawha was also a proposed state name for the 39 counties which later became the main body of the U.S. state of West Virginia, formed on October 24, 1861. History indicates that the traditions of grape growing and wine-making are rich in the Kanawha River Valley. The recently reconstructed wine cellars at Dundar, WV are a historic remnant of a flourishing viticulture which existed in the Kanawha River Valley as early as 1826. Several hundred acres of grapevines grew in the area in the 1850s. The first commercial venture into grape growing was probably established by Thomas Friend about 1856. The Civil War brought an end to commercial winemaking in the area until it was restarted with a new winery in 1967 and has expanded to its present state as a small but flourishing industry with an excellent potential.

== Terroir ==
=== Topography ===
West Virginia is known as the Mountain State, and the hilly topography in the Kanawha River Valley viticultural area has an vital effect on its terroir. Vineyards planted among the mountains benefits from the prevailing winds that funnel through the valleys and air drainage, drying the canopy and reducing the risk of fungal vine diseases in West Virginia's humid subtropical climate. The Kanawha River, a tributary of the larger Ohio River, brings moderating influences to the vineyards throughout the year, reducing seasonal temperature variation and extending the growing season somewhat in the late summer.

=== Climate ===
The Kanawha River Valley lies beyond the immediate climatic effects of the Atlantic Ocean. Its climate is classified as Continental, exhibiting marked temperature contrasts between summer and winter. The average annual temperature is approximately 52 °F (11 °C). In winter the average temperature minimum is in the 20's while the average maximum is in the upper 40's. Average summer minimum temperature range from the middle 50's to the middle 60's while the average maximum temperatures generally exceed 85 °F (29 °C). Temperatures near or in excess of 100 °F (38 °C) have been recorded at most observation stations in the valley. The prevailing winds are westerly but are frequently interrupted by northward and southward surges of relatively warm and cold air. The average annual precipitation over the Kanawha River basin is approximately 43.5 inches (1,100 mm). Precipitation is fairly well distributed throughout the year. Monthly precipitation averages indicate that the average varies from a low of 2.69 inches (68 mm) in October to a high of 4.88 inches (124 mm) in July. The average precipitation for all months is 3.65 inches (93 mm). The USDA plant hardiness zones are 6b and 7a.

=== Soils ===
The Kanawha River Valley viticultural area is in the Central Allegheny Plateau (Land Resources Area 126) Region. This region is underlain by shale, siltstone and some limestone of Permian and Pennsylvanian ages. Most of the area is steep to very steep except for the less sloping areas adjacent to the major drainages. The growing season is 150–185 days. The major soil types in the viticulture area are Gilpin, Upshur, and Vandalia. The minor types include Linside and Ashton confined to the flood plain of the Kanawha River and Monongahela. Gilpin soils with appropriate slope have a good potential for the commonly grown cultivated crops, however, erosion can be a problem if poorly managed. Soils of the Gilpin-Upshur complex are also suitable for the commonly grown cultivated crops and pastures. The erosion hazard in unprotected areas is a major management concern. Permability is moderate in the subsoil of the Gilpin soil and slow in the subsoill and substratum of the Upshur soil. In unlimed areas the Gilpin is strongly to very strongly acid and the Upshur soil is strongly acid to slightly acid. Natural fertility is low to moderate in the Gilpin soil and moderate to high in the Upshur soil. Vandalia soils are commonly on the foot slopes and have similar characteristics of the Gilpin-Upshur complex of the uplands.

== Viticulture ==
The existing vineyards within the viticulture area are quite different in location and makeup from those of the surrounding areas. All of the vineyards are located at elevations above 900 feet (270 m) above sea level. This is done to take advantage of the prevailing winds, the air drainage and the general topography. The 14 acres (5.7 ha) are divided among five owner-operators with the largest vineyard being seven acres (2.8 ha) of grapevines and the smallest being one-half one-half acre (0.20 ha) of grapevines. The makeup of the vineyard is almost exclusively French hybrid varieties and vinifera varieties. Of the fourteen acres (5.7 ha) in grapevines approximately eight point five acres (3.4 ha)are planted to French hybrid types, five acres (2.0 ha) are planted to vinifera types and only one-half acre (0.20 ha) is planted to labrusca types. The fact that vinifera types can grow and produce in the vineyards of the area differentiate it from the surrounding area.
