= West Virginia wine =

American Viticultural Area in West Virginia

West Virginia
- Wine region
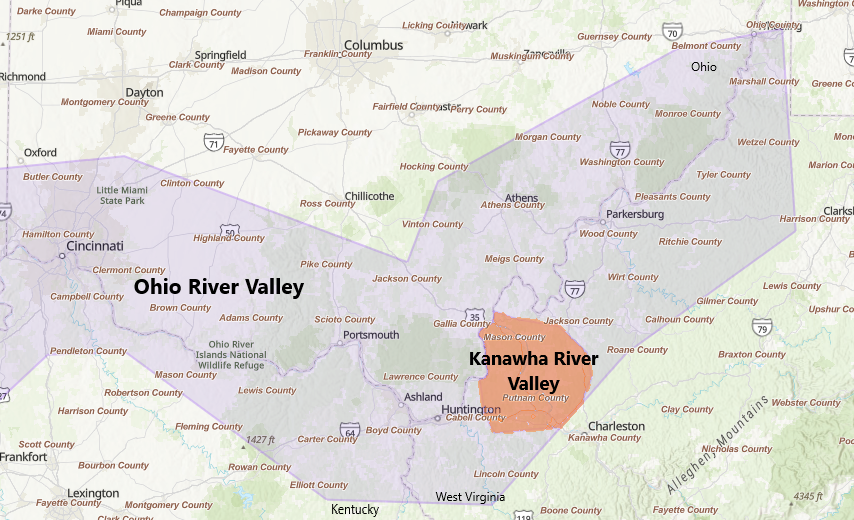
- West Virginia's AVAs
- Official name: State of West Virginia
- Type: U.S. State Appellation
- Year established: 1863
- Years of wine industry: 200
- Country: United States
- Sub-regions: Ohio River Valley AVA, Kanawha River Valley AVA
- Climate region: Continental/humid subtropical
- Total area: 15.4 million acres (24,038 sq mi)
- No. of vineyards: 4
- Grapes produced: Aurore, Baco noir, Cabernet Franc, Cabernet Sauvignon, Catawba, Cayuga, Chambourcin, Chancellor, Chardonel, Chardonnay, Concord, De Chaunac, Fredonia, Marechal Foch, Niagara, Norton, Petite Sirah, Pinot noir, Riesling, Seyval blanc, St. Pepin, St. Vincent, Van Buren, Vidal blanc, Vignoles
- No. of wineries: 11

West Virginia wine refers to wine made from grapes grown in the U.S. state appellation of West Virginia. State names in the United States automatically qualify as legal appellations of origin for wine produced from grapes grown in that state and do not require registration with the Alcohol and Tobacco Tax and Trade Bureau (TTB) of the Treasury Department. TTB was created in January 2003, when the Bureau of Alcohol, Tobacco and Firearms, or ATF, was extensively reorganized under the provisions of the Homeland Security Act of 2002.

West Virginia has eleven wineries located throughout the state among three designated American Viticultural Areas (AVA), Shenandoah Valley, Ohio River Valley and Kanawha River Valley. Only Kanawha River Valley AVA is located entirely within West Virginia while the other two extend acreage into the adjacent states of Ohio and Virginia.
Nicknamed the "Mountain State," West Virginia's topography is an important factor to wine region terroir taking advantage of the prevailing winds, the air drainage and the general geography. Vineyards planted among the mountains benefit from constant winds that are funneled through the valleys, drying the canopy and reducing the risk of fungal vine diseases in West Virginia's humid subtropical climate. Because of the state's cold winter climate, most producers focus on French hybrid and native Vitis labrusca grape varieties. The most successful Vitis vinifera plantings are Riesling in the northeast portion of the state.

== See also ==
- American wine
