= Columbus Pump House =

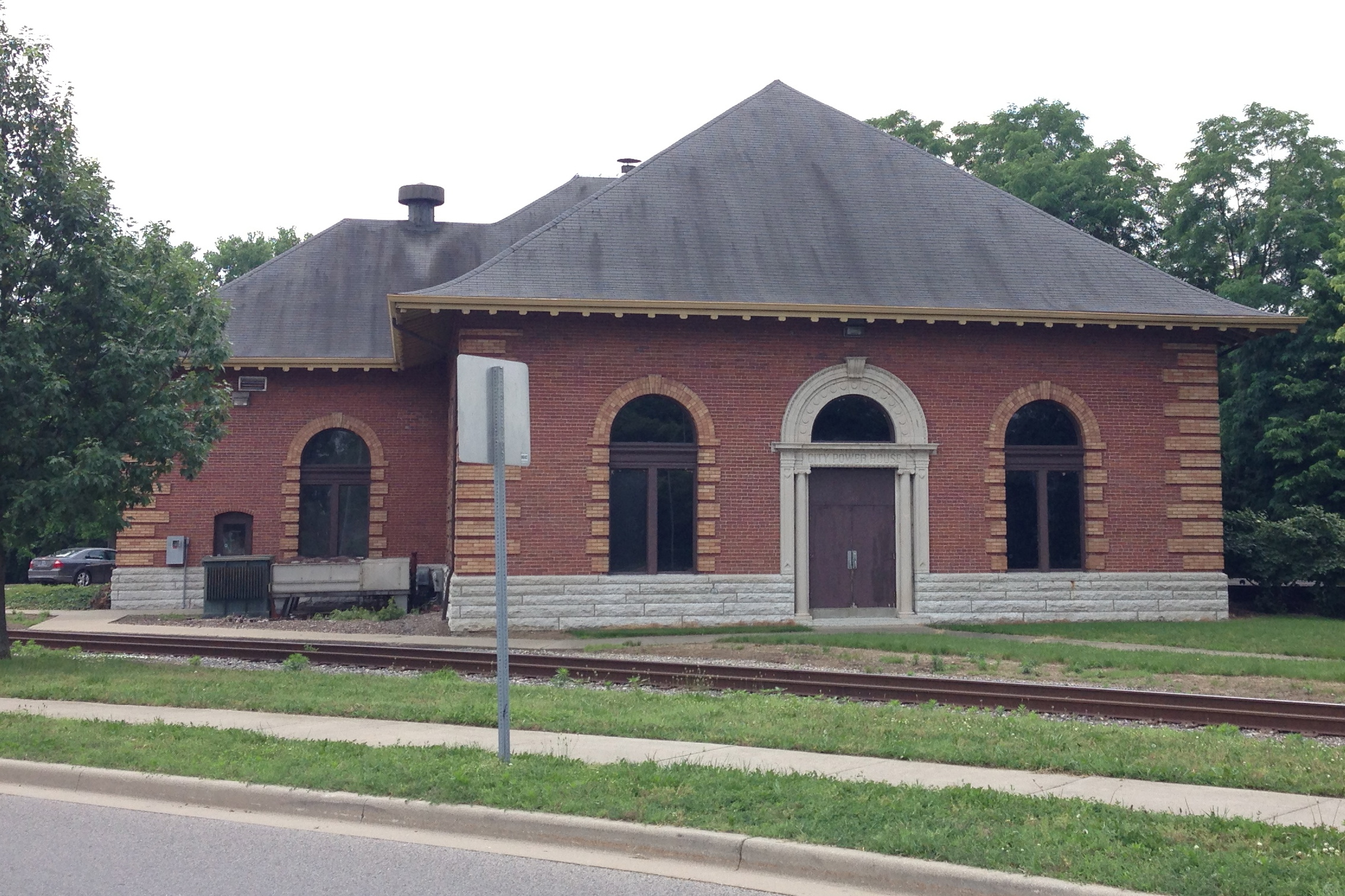
- 2013 View of the North Elevation of the Columbus Pump House
- Interactive map of the Columbus Pump House area
- Former names: Senior Center, Columbus Power House

General information
- Location: 148 Lindsey Street, Columbus, Indiana
- Coordinates: 39.19981°N 85.92525°W
- Construction started: 1901
- Completed: 1903
- Renovated: 1976, 2016
- Owner: City of Columbus

Technical details
- Structural system: Stone and brick

Design and construction
- Architect: Harrison Albright

Renovating team
- Architect: James K. Paris

The Columbus Pump House, which is also known as the Columbus Power House and the Senior Center, was designed by the architect Harrison Albright and completed in 1903. It stands on the banks of the East Fork of the White River at the foot of Second Street in Columbus, Indiana, US. From 1903 to 1951, it was the city's water works and pumped water from the river for domestic use. It also produced electricity for the city's street lighting. The city sold the property in 1952 and it was renovated to become Southern Machine Company. With a 1976 renovation it became the "Senior Center", which used the building until 2011, and in 2016, it was renovated to become a restaurant for the Upland Brewing Company.

== History ==
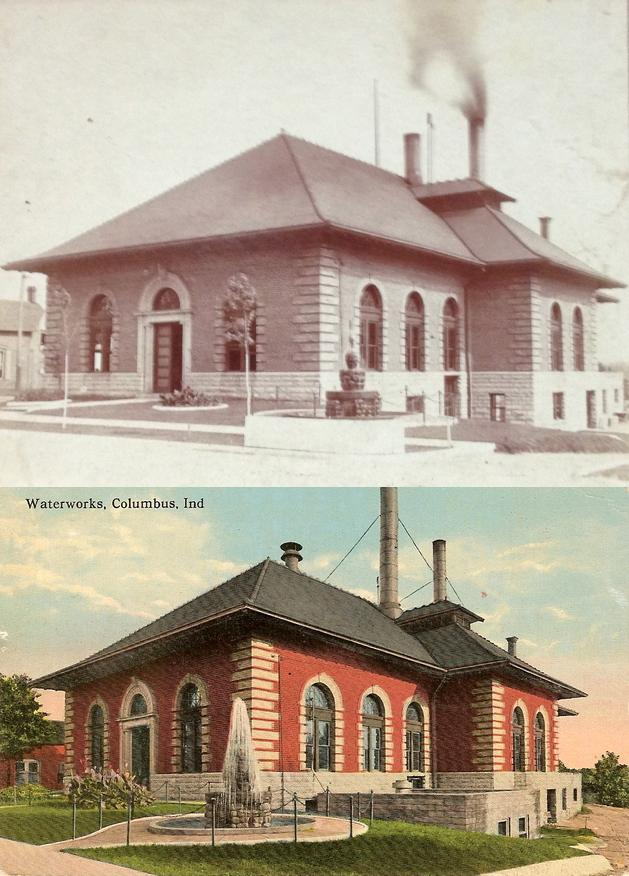
Top photo shows the northwest elevation of the Pump House before it was outfitted with dynamos to generate electricity; the bottom is a postcard showing the small addition on the west side of the basement to house the dynamos.

The first pumping station for the city water works was built on this site in 1871 at a cost of $54,000 and contained a set of large water pumps made by Holly Manufacturing Company in Buffalo, New York that could pump up to 3,000,000 gallons of water per day. Residents of Columbus called this structure "the Holly Works".

=== Construction of the Albright building ===
By the turn of the 20th century, the city had begun planning improvements to the facility. The mayor of Columbus was George W. Caldwell, a building contractor, whose company Caldwell & Drake was then building the West Baden Springs Hotel, also designed by Harrison Albright. In 1901, the city let the contract to Dunlap and Company of Columbus to begin construction of the new building designed by Albright on top of the first structure. This building began service in 1903 with new centrifugal pumps which could pump up to 8,000,000 gallons of water per day. By 1904, a small addition was made to the northwest corner to accommodate dynamos that produced enough electricity for the city street lights.

=== Southern Machine Company ownership ===
The city used this building until 1951, after which it began using a deep well system as a water source. In 1952, the building was sold to Ray and Martha Smock, owners of Southern Machine Company. With some alterations and renovations, it operated as a machine shop. The building was purchased by the Columbus Redevelopment Commission in 1972 at a cost of $65,000 with the intention to use it to help revitalize the downtown area. It was later deeded to the City of Columbus.

For a few years, the omission took up residence in the building. Part of the space was also, from 1972 to 1974, used as a fabrication workshop for Jean Tinguely's monumental sculpture, cChaos 1, which was installed in The Commons in 1974.

=== Columbus Senior Center redevelopment ===
By 1975, a community effort led to the city hiring the architect James K. Paris to draft a plan to renovate the building to accommodate the expanding Senior Center Club. With community development funds from the Department of Housing and Urban Development, nearly $400,000 was spent to renovate and repair the structure.

The work began in 1976, and was completed by Taylor Brothers Construction. The project included moving the main entrance to the southeast corner of the building, providing easier access to off-street parking. Previously, this area consisted of two large wooden doors and was used as a coal chute to load in enough fuel to power the dynamos.

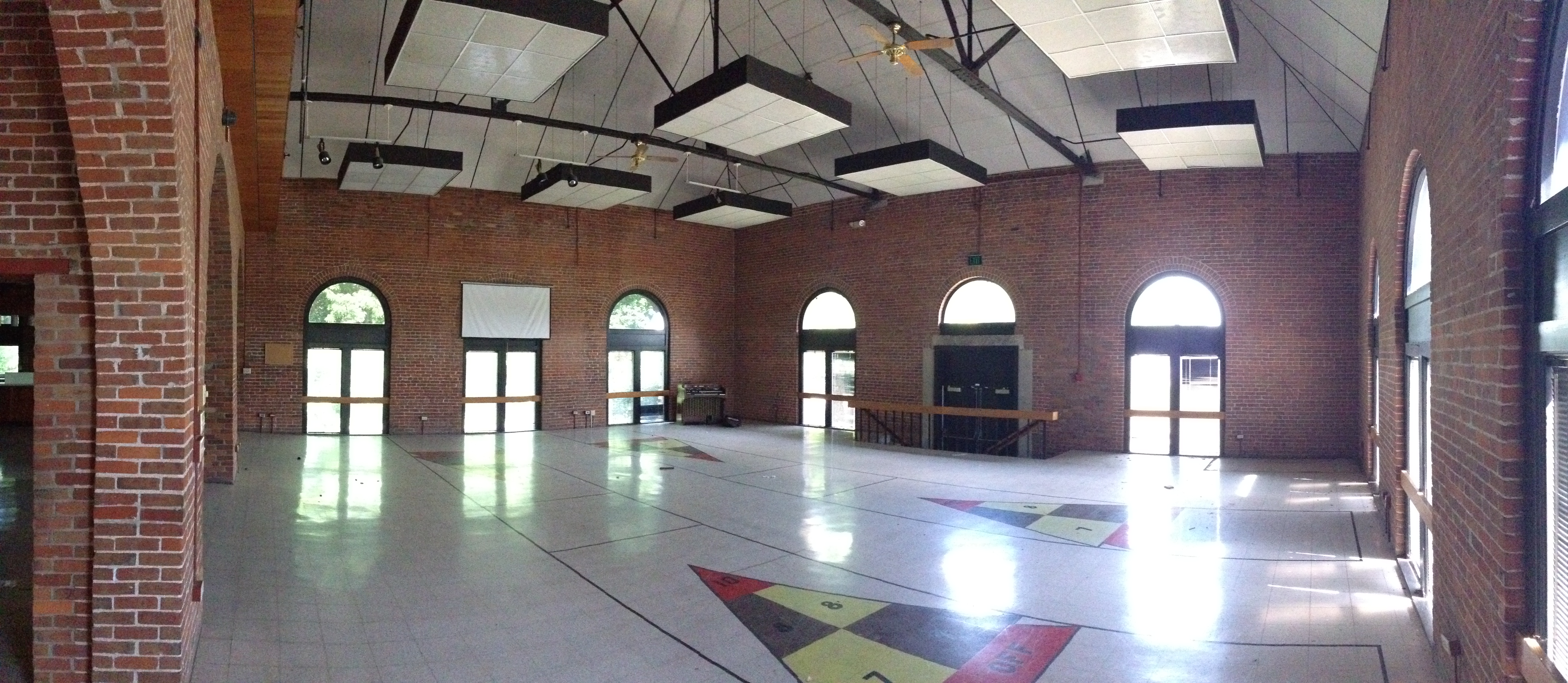
Interior of the main room of the Columbus Pump House in 2013

The new entrance added three windows and metal double doors. The original slate roof was replaced with an asphalt shingle type roof and the heating and air conditioning system was replaced. Years of soot and grime were cleaned from the interior and exterior of the building. Alterations were made to the interior to accommodate the various interests of the Senior Center Club, including the installation of ramps over stairs, the addition of an elevator and a large shuffleboard playing area.

With these renovations it successfully operated as the Senior Center until the club moved to the Mill Race Center, which opened in 2011.

=== Upland Brewing Company redevelopment ===
In 2016, the building was renovated by the Upland Brewing Company for use as a brewpub.

== Original design and construction ==
Construction for the Albright building started in September 1901. The larger footprint of this building allowed for it to be built around the previous brick building, which itself had been built over the original, wooden "Holly Works" structure. The brick and stone building has stone foundation of two-foot thick slabs and 17-inch walls on all sides.

The two-color brick scheme provides accent around the windows and doors, highlighting the arches over the windows. The hip-roofed structure was originally covered with gray, clay tiles and had a number of ventilation stacks protruding high above the roof line.

=== Relationship to the East Fork of the White River ===
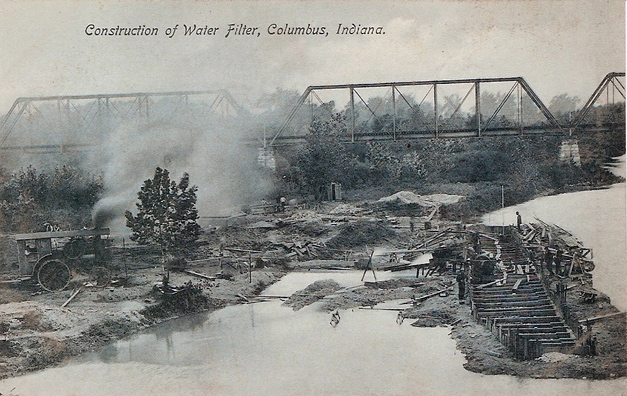
Construction of the 1903 water filter in Columbus, Indiana with the Second Street Bridge visible in the background

The location of the building is directly related to the river from which it pumped water. A simple filter was built into the East Fork of the White River in 1903 and directed water into a cistern 10 feet in diameter and 35 feet deep. This filtration system was used until 1913 when a new one was developed that was based on a rapid sand filter and relied on a testing laboratory inside the Pump House to insure the potability of the water.

Until 1952, the Second Street Bridge (also called the "Wagon Bridge") stood next to this building. The new Tipton Bridge opened in 1952. The eastern abutment for the Second Street Bridge was renovated in 1996 with funding provided by a local group, The River Rats, to become an overlook area that has also been an area to exhibit outdoor sculpture.

== Historical status ==
Several publications have indicated that this property is listed on the National Register of Historic Places listings in Bartholomew County, Indiana, this is not true.

The property was surveyed in both the 1980 and 2012 Indiana Historic Sites and Structures Inventory (IHSSI). This architectural inventory is administered by the Department of Natural Resources, Division of Historic Preservation and Archaeology (DHPA), also called the survey program. Since 1978, Indiana Landmarks has partnered the DHPA by conducting the survey on a county-by-county basis.

In the 1980 survey, it was listed as "Outstanding" and in the 2012 survey it was listed as "Notable".
