= Oliver Winery =

Winery in Indiana, United States

- Location: 200E Winery Road, Bloomington, Indiana, United States
- Wine region: Indiana Uplands AVA
- Founded: 1972
- Key people: Pat Brown, CEO; Bill Oliver, Co-Founder & Board Member
- Cases/yr: 725,000
- Website: https://www.oliverwinery.com/

Oliver Winery is the largest and oldest-still operating winery in the U.S. state of Indiana. It operates in Monroe County north of Bloomington and features a tasting room, gardens, porch, and land for picnics.

== History ==
Professor William Oliver, a law instructor at Indiana University, moved to Bloomington in 1959 with his wife and children and began making wine in his home from grapes purchased at an Ohio vineyard. In the 1960s he purchased land near Bloomington in order to grow his own, and by 1970 operated some 30 acres (120,000 m^{2}) of vineyard. Oliver Winery opened in the spring of 1972 and reached an annual production of 38,000 gallons by 1978. It was in 1972 that the winery also began making Camelot Mead, which generated increasing sales. William Oliver was an integral part to the creation and passing of the Small Winery Act of 1971 in Indiana which permitted direct sale of wine to the public not through distribution channels.

Oliver's first tasting room was opened to the public in 1973 where William's wife Mary worked alongside a few other employees. The first bottle was sold on May 1, 1973. The team planted Aurora, Baco Noir, Cascade, Chelois, De Chaunac, Foch, Léon Millot, Seyvall blanc, White Baco, and Vidal 256 grape varieties at the end of the 1976 season. With the success of Camelot Mead, an offshoot corporation was formed in 1977. Camelot Mead, the corporation, acquired space in Ellettsville for bottling and shipping of the product with the same name.

William's son Bill assumed the management of the winery in 1983 and introduced the use of grapes from outside Indiana in Oliver wines in 1988. They opened a tasting room in Indianapolis Union Station in 1986 that introduced many travelers to Indiana wine. Annual production exceeded 100,000 gallons by the late 1990s, and the winery expects to produce 500,000 to 600,000 gallons in 2007.

By 2020 Oliver Winery was the 43rd largest US winery selling 400,000 cases of wine. Post-pandemic, the number increased to 700,000 cases of wine making them the 29th largest US winery. In 2024 when Oliver Winery named Patrick Brown as CEO, they were producing 725,000 cases annually.

From 2006 to 2021 the winery was employee-owned, however in 2021 the winery was purchased by NexPhase Capital, LP. The winery invested $12.6 million in 2023 to purchase additional equipment, including 10 large fermentation tanks and a new bottling line.

== Wines ==
One of the earliest marketed labels from Oliver Winery was Camelot Mead, a honey wine, originally introduced in 1973. The wine featured in the winery's first festival, Camelot Wine Festival, April 29–30, 1977. The recipe was purchased in California with rights to produce, and ensured stable income for Oliver while the vines grew to bear fruit. Camelot Mead made up 85% of their income, having made 35,000 gallons in 1977. By 1978 the winery was producing a Cellar White, light dry; a Cellar Red, dry red; a Rose, semi-dry; a Country Red, semi-sweet and fruity; a Country White, fruity; and Indiana White, the driest of their wines.

In 1983, Camelot Mead was sold internationally to Japan after restrictions on honey imports were dropped with the help of Indiana's Department of Commerce. By 1985 Oliver had introduced Soft Red, a sweet and fruit red produced from Concord grapes. It won best wine in the Concord Class at the Eastern Wine Competition held in Rochester, New York that year. Soft Red became Oliver's second-best selling wine after Camelot Mead. By 1987 the winery was producing Beanblossom Red, sweet made from Concord grapes; Beanblossom White, sweet from Niagara grapes; Beanblossom Blush, fruity and sweet from Catawba grapes; Beanblossom Apple, made fom Indiana apples; Beanblossom Peach, made from peaches and honey; Camelot Mead; De Chaunac Rose, semi-dry; Foch, dry red; Seyval Blanc, dry white; Vidal; and Vidal Swiss Reserve.

Oliver Winery established the Creekbend Vineyard label in 2004.

== Accolades ==
=== Awards ===
The 1988 Oliver Winery Gewürztraminer won gold at the 1989 Indiana State Fair wine competition in the Sweet white vinifera category and gold at the San Francisco Fair. Their 1988 Sauvignon Blanc and 1988 Merlot won silver medals at the San Diego National Wine Competition.

At the 1991 Indiana State Fair, Oliver Winery won gold for 1990 Riesling in the sweet white vinifera category; gold for Soft Red in American red; gold for Soft White in American white; silver for 1988 Sauvignon Blanc in dry white vinifera; silver for 1988 Muscat Canelli in sweet white vinifera; and bronze for 1989 Gewürztraminer in sweet white vinifera.

At the 1994 Indiana State Fair Oliver Winery won the Governor's Trophy for receiving the most first place awards; they won 20 first places in the Indiana-only division.

Oliver Winery took home 21 medals at the Indy International Wine Competition in 2005, winning the Indiana Governor's Cup for the most award-winning Indiana winery.

Oliver Winery brought home two Concordance Gold medals for their Blackberry and Viognier wines in the 2007 Indy International Wine Competition.

== See also ==
- Indiana wine
- Traminette (grape hybrid) – Indiana's state wine
- Upland Brewing Company – Oliver Winery helped Upland establish their sours
