= Ohio River Valley AVA =

Wine region along the Ohio River

Coordinates: 39.10287°N 84.81918°W

Ohio River Valley
- Wine region
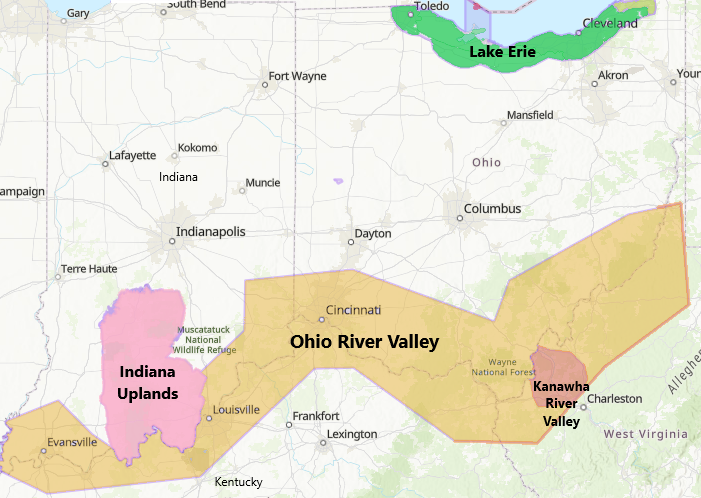
- Type: American Viticultural Area
- Year established: 1983; 2013 Amend
- Years of wine industry: 176
- Country: United States
- Part of: Indiana, Kentucky, Ohio, West Virginia
- Sub-regions: Kanawha River Valley AVA
- Growing season: 175 days
- Climate region: Region IV
- Heat units: 3,541 GDD
- Precipitation (annual average): 35 to 40 in (890–1,020 mm)
- Soil conditions: Gray-Brown Podzolic
- Total area: 16.6 million acres (26,000 sq mi); 2013: 15,660,000 acres (24,470 sq mi)
- Size of planted vineyards: 570 acres (230 ha)
- No. of vineyards: 463
- Grapes produced: Cabernet Franc, Cabernet Sauvignon, Catawba, Cayuga, Chambourcin, Chardonnay, Concord, De Chaunac, Marechal Foch, Melon, Merlot, Niagara, Pinot blanc, Pinot gris, Pinot noir, Reliance, Riesling, Rougeon, Roussanne, Sauvignon blanc, Sémillon, Seyval blanc, Steuben, Syrah, Traminette, Vidal Blanc, Viognier
- No. of wineries: 18

Ohio River Valley is an American Viticultural Area (AVA) centered on the Ohio River, the vast Ohio River Valley and its adjacent terrain. It is the United States' second largest wine appellation of origin, behind Upper Mississippi Valley, encompassing 16.6 million acres (26,000 sq mi) through portions of Indiana, Kentucky, Ohio and West Virginia. It was established as the nation's 41st, Ohio's third and Indiana, Kentucky and West Virginia's initial AVA on September 7, 1983, by the Bureau of Alcohol, Tobacco and Firearms (ATF), Treasury after reviewing the petition submitted by Mr. John A. Garrett, proprietor of Villa Milan Vineyards located in Milan, Indiana, proposing the multi-state viticultural area known as "Ohio River Valley."

In 2013, the viticultural area was reduced by approximately 1,530 sq mi (979,200 acres) when the Alcohol and Tobacco Tax and Trade Bureau (TTB) established Indiana Uplands AVA adjacent to the Ohio River Valley's border in Indiana. The area mostly cultivates hybrid grapes like Baco noir, Marechal Foch, Seyval blanc and Vidal with Vitis vinifera varieties such as Cabernet Franc, Cabernet Sauvignon, Chardonnay, Petit Manseng and Riesling being the most common.

== History ==
The Ohio River Valley AVA is the birthplace of American viticulture. Wine has been produced in Ohio since 1823 when Nicholas Longworth planted the first Alexander and Isabella grapes in the Ohio River Valley. In 1825, Longworth planted the first Catawba grapes in Ohio. Others soon planted Catawba in new vineyards throughout the state and by 1860, Catawba was the most important grape variety in Ohio. At this time, Ohio produced more wine than any other state in the country, and Cincinnati was the most important city in the national wine trade. Of the 570,000 gallons of wine that were produced each year in Ohio, 200,000 came from Brown County.

In the 19th century, wine was expensive and non-trellised vines succumbed to fungal diseases. Horses farmed the narrow ridges where mechanized means could not and tobacco farming became profitable. Many states were affected by the national Prohibition which destroyed the Ohio wine industry that struggled to recover after the Repeal.

== Climate and geology ==
The Ohio River is a climatic transition area as its water runs along the periphery of the humid subtropical climate and humid continental climate thereby being inhabited by fauna and flora of both climates. The USDA plant hardiness zones are 6b to 7b.

The Ohio River is young from a geologic standpoint. The river formed on a piecemeal basis beginning between 2.5 and 3 million years ago. The earliest Ice Ages occurred at this time and dammed portions of north flowing rivers. The Teays River was the largest of these rivers, and the modern Ohio River flows within segments of the ancient Teays. The ancient rivers were rearranged or consumed by glaciers and lakes.

The vineyard soils of the Ohio River Valley are diverse, being on the boundary between glaciated and non-glaciated.
