= Harvest ale =

Harvest ale is not a defined style or class of beer, but rather is a marketing term and common name for many different beers. The tagline generally refers to beers being brewed for fall harvests. This most commonly refers to the hop harvest but can also be connected with grain harvest, Oktoberfest, or as a general term for fall seasonal beers.

== Examples ==
- J.W. Lees Harvest Ale

J.W. Lees is the first popular beer to use the term Harvest Ale, being created in 1986. This beer is brewed to celebrate both the barley and hops harvest. The style was English Barley Wine, being very malt forward with little hop presence.

- Sierra Nevada Harvest

This fresh hop India pale ale was created in the 1990s and popularized the idea in America of a harvest ale being a fresh hop or wet hop beer style.

- Founders Harvest Ale

A popular American wet hop IPA.
