= List of breweries in Indiana =

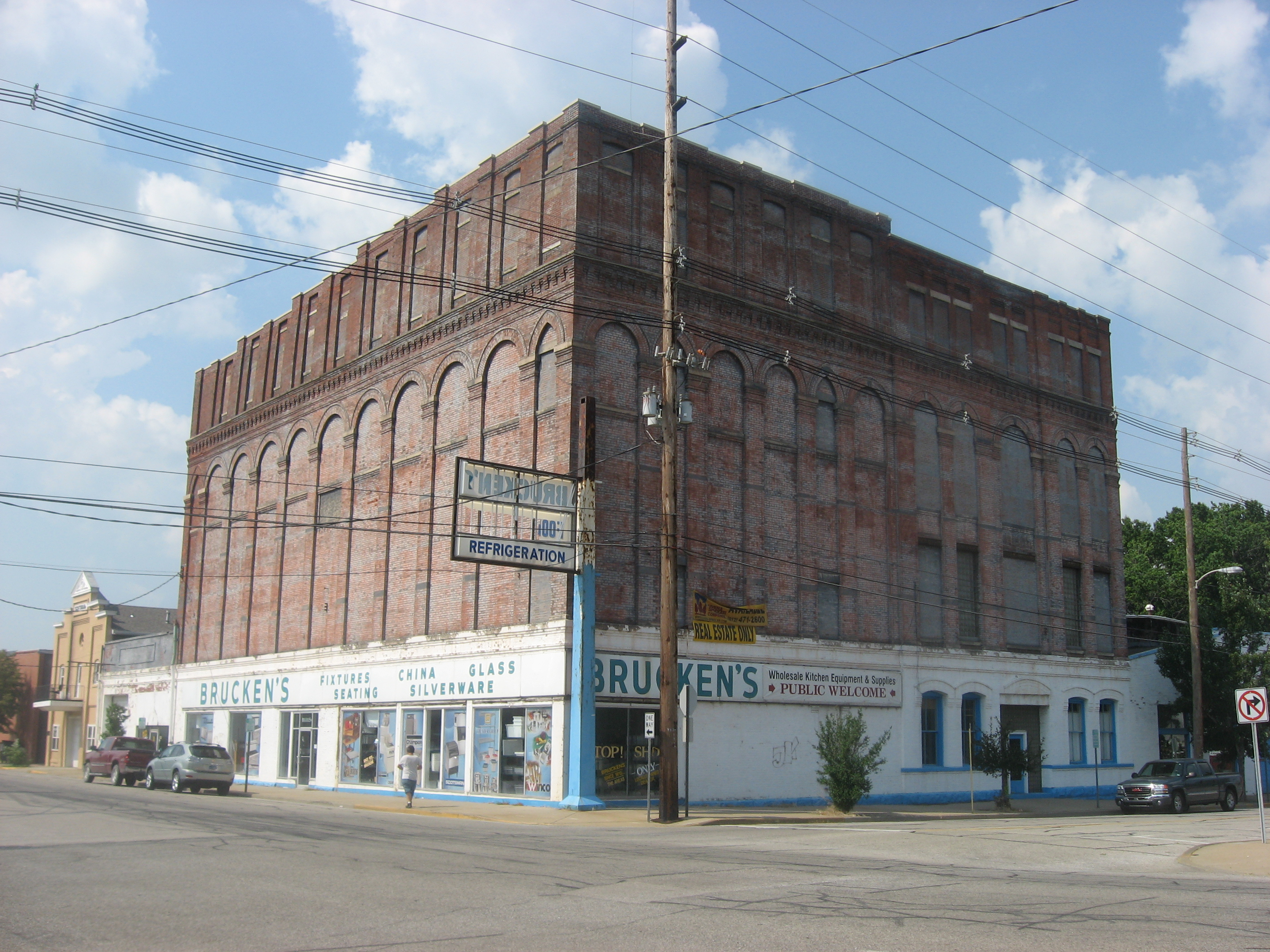
The Evansville Brewing Company building in Evansville

Breweries in Indiana produce a wide range of beers. Hoosiers have been brewing beer since 1814 in New Harmony. In 2012, Indiana's 68 breweries and brewpubs employed 260 people directly, and more than 23,000 others in related jobs such as wholesaling and retailing. Including people directly employed in brewing, as well as those who supply Indiana's breweries with everything from ingredients to machinery, the total business and personal tax revenue generated by Indiana's breweries and related industries was more than $456 million. Consumer purchases of Indiana's brewery products generated almost $192 million extra in tax revenue. In 2012, according to the Brewers Association, Indiana ranked 22nd in the number of craft breweries per capita, with 54. For context, at the end of 2013 there were 2,822 breweries in the United States, including 2,768 craft breweries subdivided into 1,237 brewpubs, 1,412 microbreweries and 119 regional craft breweries. In that same year, according to the Beer Institute, the brewing industry employed around 2 million Americans in the brewing industry (brewing, distribution and retail) and had a combined economic impact of more than $246 billion.

In 2025, US beer production including craft brewer volume sales, reduced from the previous year due to price increases. Indiana operated 185 craft breweries in 2025, ranking 18th in the US, and produced 222,088 barrels of craft beer that year, ranking 23rd in the US.

== Breweries and brewpubs ==
- Bier Brewery and Taproom – Indianapolis/Carmel/Noblesville – opened in 2010; won gold for Roggenschnizzle at 2026 World Beer Cup and silver for it at the 2024 Great American Beer Festival
- Broad Ripple Brewpub – Indianapolis/Broad Ripple – Indiana's first brewpub, restaurant that brewed its own beer, in 1990; first Indiana brewery to win gold at Great American Beer Festival in 1991 for Extra Bitter Special (EBS)
- Byway Brewing Company – Hammond – 2016 Grand Champion Brewery at Indiana Brewers' Cup; won silver for Shinobi at 2023 Great American Beer Festival
- Daredevil Brewing Company – Indianapolis – 2018 Grand Champion Brewery at Indiana Brewers' Cup; 2017 Grand Champion Brewery at Indiana Brewers' Cup
- Field Brewing – Westfield – won bronze for Dill Pickle at the 2024 Great American Beer Festival
- Guggman Haus Brewing Company – Indianapolis – won Bronze for Riverside NEIPA at 2025 World Beer Cup
- Metazoa Brewing Company – Indianapolis – won gold for Ain't Afraid of No Goats and bronze fo Ruh Roh at 2024 World Beer Cup
- New Albanian Brewing – New Albany – brewpub, started as a restaurant in 1987; brewery operations began in 2002
- Primeval Brewing – Noblesville – 2026 Grand Champion Brewery at Indiana Brewers' Cup
- Sun King Brewing – Indianapolis/Fishers– taproom, downtown Indianapolis brewery opened in 2009, Fishers brewery opened in 2015, other locations in Broad Ripple and Carmel
- Taxman Brewing Company – Bargersville – established in 2013; three pubs in the greater Indianapolis area; won golds for Deduction and In the Black and bronze for Qualified at 2025 Great American Beer Festival
- Terre Haute Brewing Company – Terre Haute – opened in 1837; seventh largest brewery in the US pre-prohibition
- The Tap Brewery – Bloomington – won silver for Kill the LIghts at 2024 Great American Beer Festival
- Thieme and Wagner – Lafayette – originally opened in 1863, reopened in 2016.
- Three Floyds Brewing– Munster – brewpub, brewery originally opened in Hammond in 1996 and moved to Munster in 2000. The brewpub opened in 2005.
- Upland Brewing Company –Indianapolis/Bloomington- Bloomington Brewpub opened in 1998, Broad Ripple Tasting Room in 2010, Bloomington Production Brewery in 2012, Carmel Tap House in 2013, Wood Shop in Bloomington and Columbus Pump House in 2016, Fountain Square Brewery in 2019, Upland Jeffersonville in 2021, and Upland 82nd Street in Indianapolis in 2022.

== Former breweries ==
- Evansville Brewing Company – Evansville – building listed on National Register of Historic Places
- Hoham-Klinghammer-Weckerle House and Brewery Site – Plymouth – listed on the National Register of Historic Places; the Plymouth Brewery was operated on site from 1857 to 1888
- Indianapolis Brewing Company – one of the largest breweries in Indiana, formed in 1887, earned a gold medal in 1900 at Paris Exposition
- Kamm and Schellinger Brewery – Mishawaka – listed on the National Register of Historic Places
- Muessel-Drewry Brewery – South Bend – building listed on National Register of Historic Places
- Old Crown Brewing Corporation – Fort Wayne
- South Bend Brewing Association – South Bend – building listed on National Register of Historic Places
- Sterling Brewers – Evansville – originally Fulton Avenue Brewery, then renamed Sterling Brewers, before opening in 1988 as Evansville Brewing Company
- Thr3e Wise Men Brewing Company – Broad Ripple – closed in 2019; won silver for Hot for Teacher Ms. Doppelbock at 2014 World Beer Cup

== See also ==
- Beer in the United States
- List of breweries in the United States
- List of microbreweries
- List of wineries in Indiana
