= Indianapolis Brewing Company =

Brewery in Indianapolis, Indiana, U.S. (1887–1948)

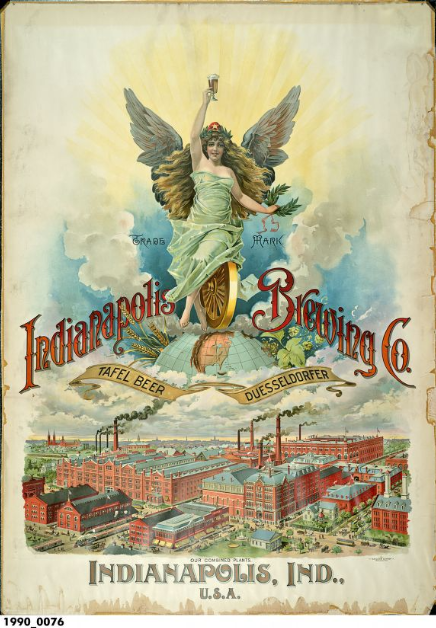
- 19th-century poster for the Indianapolis Brewing Company
- Location: Indianapolis, Indiana, United States
- Opened: 1887
- Closed: 1948
- Key people: Lawrence Barden

Indianapolis Brewing Company (IBC) was a brewery in Indianapolis, Indiana, in the United States. The brewery opened in 1887 and closed in 1948. During its existence, it won medals at the 1900 Paris Exposition and the 1904 St. Louis World’s Fair. The brewery operated during Prohibition, producing tonic and malt extract.

== History ==
The Indianapolis Brewing Company was founded in 1887 in Indianapolis, Indiana. The company was formed by the merger of three Indianapolis breweries: C.F. Schmidt Brewing Company, Casper Maus Brewery, and P. Lieber Brewing Company City Brewery. These three companies operated as breweries under the IBC name. The main brewery was the P. Lieber property. IBC was the largest brewery in the state and operated its own rail line to deliver beer.

The C. F. Schmidt Brewery was originally founded in 1858 by Christian Frederick Schmidt and Charles Jaeger. It was located at the current site of Eli Lilly and Company's headquarters. Their best selling beers were lagers. The C. F. Schmidt Brewery closed on May 27, 1920.

In 1933, after Prohibition, IBC changed its name to Indiana Breweries, Inc. In 1935, they returned to using the Indianapolis Brewing Company name. In 1948, IBC president Lawrence Barden was found guilty of under-filling beer bottles. He went to jail and IBC went bankrupt.

== Products ==
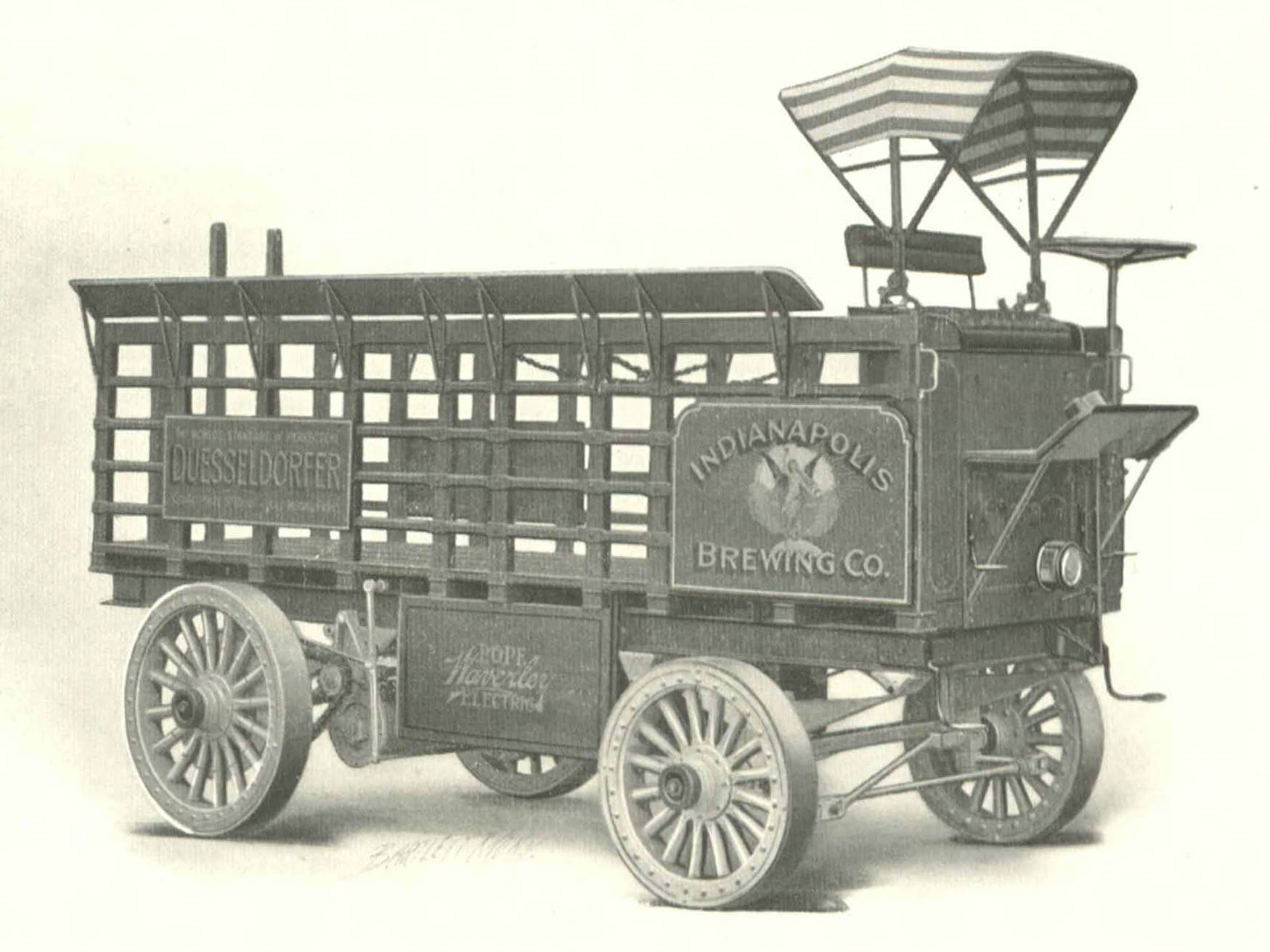
A 1907 advertisement for IBC's award-winning Duesseldorfer beer.

The brewery produced various beers, including Derbey, Progress, Burgomaster, Pilsner Club, Indiana Club, Crown Select, Lieber’s Gold Metal Beer, Circle City, and more. Their Duesseldorfer was their most award-winning beer, winning awards at the 1900 Paris Exposition and the 1904 St. Louis World’s Fair.

Aside from beer, the brewery also produced non-alcoholic malt extracts and a beverage called Ozotonic. IBC trialed Tonica, a temperance drink, in 1908. These items became the breweries sole focus during Prohibition from 1920 until 1933.

== Legacy ==
The papers of the Indianapolis Brewing Company are in the collection of the Indiana State Library.

In 1990, Thomas W. Peters and Richard W. Harris of Nap Town Brewing Company on North Post Road in Indianapolis purchased the rights to the Indianapolis Brewing Company from Ben Domont. They changed the brewery name and labels to Indianapolis Brewing Company using the historic recipes. It was listed as the state's only microbrewery at the time, making fewer than 15,00 barrels per year.

As of 2023, the Indianapolis Brewing Company name was revived by Sun King Brewing for a limited-edition lager. The release drew attention to the city’s brewing heritage and the legacy of the original 1887 company.

== See also ==
- List of defunct breweries in the United States
- List of breweries in Indiana
