= American wild ale =

American beer style

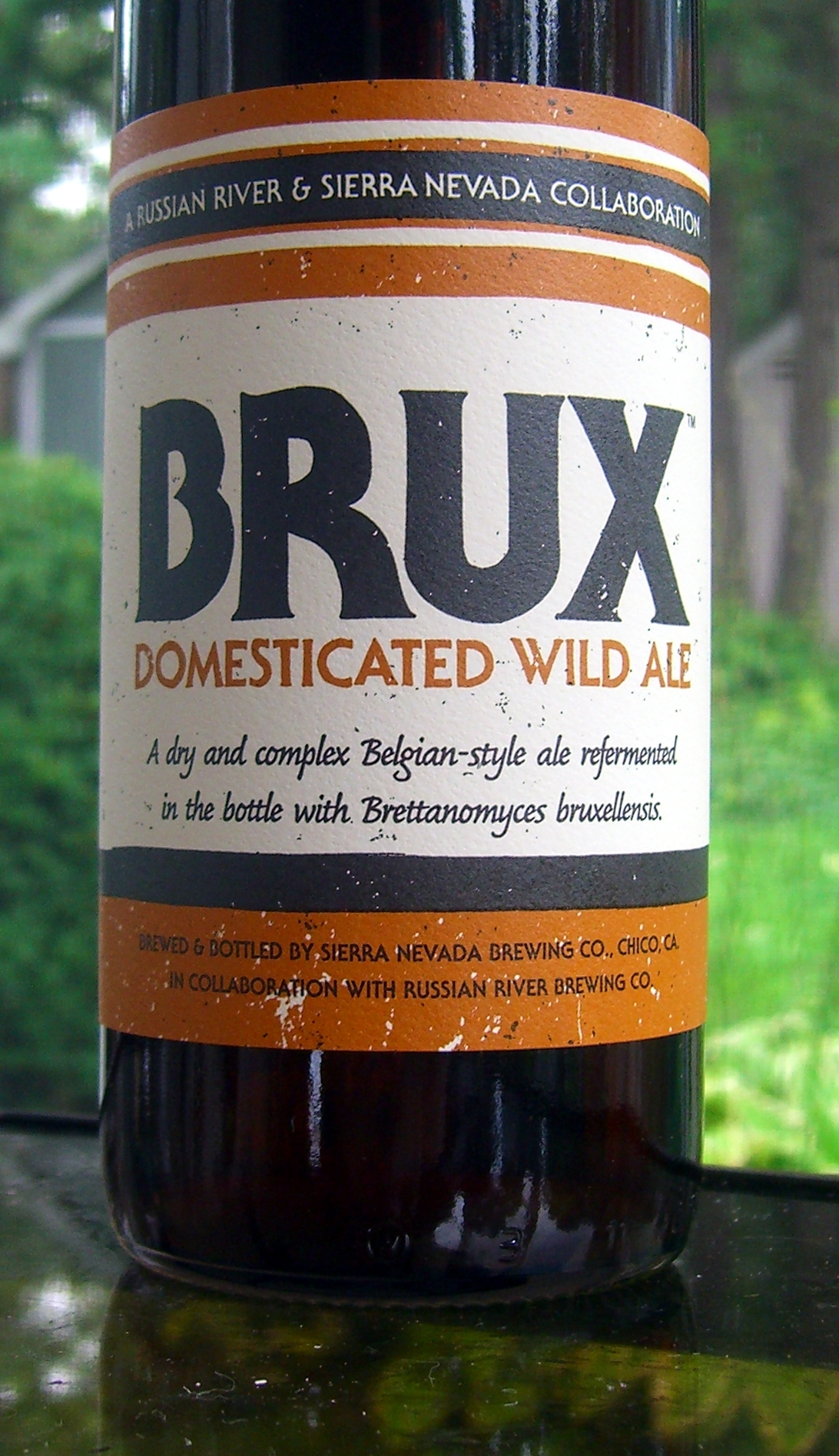
"Brux", a collaborative American wild ale

American wild ale is a sour beer brewed in the United States using yeast or bacteria in addition to Saccharomyces cerevisiae for fermentation. Such beers are similar to Belgian Lambic and Oud bruin, and typically fermented using a strain of brettanomyces, resulting in a "funky" flavor.

== See also ==
- List of beer styles
