= Norman Upland =

Upland in Indiana, U.S.

The Norman Upland of southern Indiana comprises hilly terrain caused by the outcropping of sandstone units at the surface. The Norman Upland is the result of the exposure of the ancient Borden deltaic complex, which includes the Borden Formation. The age of the rocks in the Norman Upland are Mississippian.

== See also ==
- Mitchell Plain
- Crawford Upland
