= Mitchell Plain =

Coordinates: 38°25′N 86°10′W

The Mitchell Plain is a karst area in Indiana of relatively low relief. The extensive underlying cave system developed in Mississippian age limestone bedrock. Surface drainage is rare due to most streams in the area disappearing into caves or joints within the rock.

The limestone is a vestige of an early shallow cratonic sea that covered what would become Indiana, while the north–south linearity of the region is left over from the Cincinnati Uplift, sloping the rock layers from a high in the East sloping downward towards Cairo, Illinois.

The Mitchell Plain is bound by the older rocks of Norman Upland on the East and the younger rocks of Crawford Upland on the West.
