= Crawford Upland =

Coordinates: 38°30′N 86°40′W

The Crawford Upland of Southern Indiana, United States. The western section of the Indiana Uplands, this region contains the hilliest terrain in the state caused by the outcropping of sandstone units at the surface. In some areas erosion cuts through the sandstone layers completely and exposes underlying limestones. The exposure of limestone at the surface in the Crawford Upland results in the formation of caves, dolines, and other surface expressions of karst topography. The alternating sandstones, limestones, and shale of the West Baden and Stephensport groups that compose the Crawford Upland are Mississippian in age. Interstate 64 traverses this section within Perry, Crawford, Harrison, and Floyd Counties.
