= Appalachain High Country AVA =

American Viticultural Area in Virginia and West Virginia

Coordinates: 36°11′25″N 81°50′26″W

Appalachian High Country
- Wine region
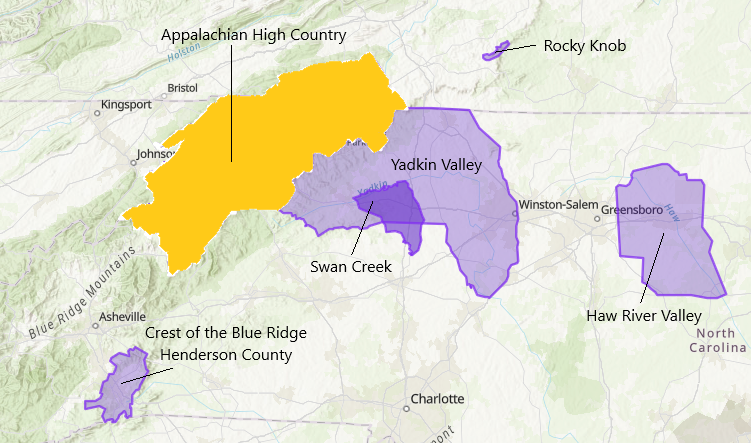
- Type: American Viticultural Area
- Year established: 2016
- Country: United States
- Part of: North Carolina, Tennessee, Virginia
- Other regions in North Carolina, Tennessee, Virginia: Crest of the Blue Ridge Henderson County AVA, Rocky Knob AVA, Swan Creek AVA, Upper Hiwassee Highlands AVA, Yadkin Valley AVA
- Growing season: 139.2 days
- Climate region: Regions I-V
- Heat units: 61.3 °F (16.3 °C)
- Precipitation (annual average): 48.6 in (1,234.4 mm)
- Soil conditions: Tusquitee-Edneyville series; Granite and gneiss with fine loam
- Total area: 2,400 sq mi (1,536,000 acres)
- No. of vineyards: 20
- Grapes produced: Cabernet Franc, Merlot, Frontenac, Marechal Foch, Marquette, Pinot Noir, Riesling, Seyval Blanc, Traminette, Vidal Blanc and Viognier
- No. of wineries: 10

Appalachian High Country is an American Viticultural Area (AVA) located mainly in North Carolina with sections in Tennessee and Virginia. The approximately 2,400 square miles (1,536,000 acres) viticultural area encompasses all or portions of the following counties: Alleghany, Ashe, Avery, Mitchell, and Watauga Counties in North Carolina; Carter County and Johnson Counties in Tennessee; and Grayson County in Virginia. The appellation was recognized on February 28, 2016, by the Alcohol and Tobacco Tax and Trade Bureau (TTB), Treasury as the country's 239th, North Carolina's 5th, Tennessee's 2nd and Virginia's 8th AVA after reviewing the petition from Johnnie James, owner of Bethel Valley Farms, on behalf of members of the High Country Wine Growers Association, proposing the establishment of the viticultural area named "Appalachian High Country."

The establishment of the Appalachian High Country AVA does not affect any existing AVA and will allow vintners to use "Appalachian High Country" as an appellation of origin for wines made primarily from grapes grown within the Appalachian High Country AVA if the wines meet the eligibility TTB requirements for the appellation.

== Name Evidence ==
The region of the Appalachian High Country AVA is often referred to as the "High Country" because of its high elevations, which, according to the petition, are considered to be the highest average elevations east of the Mississippi River. The High Country Wine Growers Association chose to add "Appalachian" to the proposed AVA name as a reference to its location within the Appalachian Mountains, as well as to distinguish the proposed AVA from other regions across the country that are also referred to as "High Country." The petition included evidence that the phrase "High Country" applies to the region of the proposed AVA. Several tourism Web sites that feature the region of the proposed AVA include the phrase "High Country" in their names, including "High Country Host", "High Country Journey", and "GO NC High Country." The High Country Council of Governments is a planning and development association of county and municipal governments in northwestern North Carolina, including Alleghany, Ashe, Avery, Mitchell and Watauga Counties. The petition also included a listing of over 100 businesses and organizations within the proposed AVA that use the phrase "High Country" in their names, including High Country Wedding and Event Coordinators in Butler, Tennessee (Johnson County); High Country Horse Camp in Troutdale, Virginia (Grayson County); High Country Bottling Company in [West Jefferson, North Carolina (Ashe County); High Country Hearth and Chimney in Banner Elk, North Carolina (Avery County); High Country Academy Tutoring Service (Watauga County); and High Country Drywall in Laurel Springs, North Carolina (Alleghany County). The petition included a listing of over 40 additional businesses and organizations that routinely use the phrase "High Country" in their printed or radio advertisements. For example, Boone Drug, which has locations in all of the Tennessee and North Carolina counties within the AVA, advertises that the pharmacy chain was established in 1919 and "has proudly been serving the High Country ever since..." Prospect Hill Bed and Breakfast, located in Mountain City, Tennessee and also within the proposed AVA, invites guests to "enjoy the wonders of the Appalachian High Country." Red Tail Mountain Resort and Golf, also located in Mountain City, Tennessee, advertises itself as "the finest mountain golf in the High Country." Finally, Appalachian Blinds and Closet Company, located in Boone, North Carolina, advertises as the "High Country's one-stop shop" for home decorating needs.

== Terroir ==
The vineyards are found at unusually high altitudes, ranging from 2,290 to 4,630 feet (700–1,410 m) with most above 3,000 feet (910 m). Over half are planted on slopes with angles of 30 degrees or greater. The cool climate means hardy varieties such as Vidal, Marquette, Seyval Blanc and Traminette are popular. According to the petition, the distinguishing features of the proposed Appalachian High Country AVA are its topography, climate, and soils.

=== Topography ===
The topography of the Appalachian High Country AVA, is located within the Appalachian Mountains, is characterized by high elevations and steep slopes. Elevations within the AVA range from 1,338 feet (408 m) to over 6,000 feet (1,800 m) with most vineyards planted at elevations between 2,290 and 4,630 feet (700–1,410 m). The high elevations expose vineyards to high amounts of solar irradiance, which promotes grape maturation and compensates for low temperatures and a short growing season. The average slope angle within the AVA is 35.9 degrees, and most vineyards are planted on slopes with angles of 30 degrees or greater. Because of the steep slopes, many of the vineyards within the AVA are terraced to prevent erosion and vineyard work is performed manually rather than with machinery. The regions surrounding the AVA all have lower average elevations as well as smaller average slope angles, except for the region to the southwest, which has a slightly greater average slope angle.

=== Climate ===
Appalachian High Country is characterized by a cool climate and a short growing season. The average annual temperature within the area is 51.5 °F (10.8 °C). The AVA accumulates an average of 2,635 growing degree days (GDD) during the growing season, which is approximately 139.2 days long. Because of the cool climate and short growing season, the region is suitable for growing cold-hardy grape varietals such as Marquette, Vidal Blanc, and Frontenac, which do not have a lengthy maturation time. By contrast, the regions surrounding the AVA have warmer temperatures, longer growing seasons, and higher growing degree accumulations, making these regions more suitable for growing grape varietals that require warmer temperatures and a longer maturation time.

=== Soil ===
The soils of Appalachian High Country are derived from igneous and metamorphic rocks such as granite and gneiss. All of the common soil series within the AVA are described as deep, well-drained soils with a fine, loamy texture. The well-drained soils help reduce the risk of rot and fungus in the grapevines. Organic matter constitutes up to 14 percent of the soils within the AVA, providing an excellent source of nutrients for vineyards. The most prevalent soil series is the Tusquitee-Edneyville, which covers approximately 24 percent of the AVA. By contrast, in the surrounding regions, other soil series are more prominent. To the northeast of the AVA, the Hayesville series is the most common soil series, and the Frederick–Carbo soil series is most commonly found in the region northwest of the AVA. Southeast of the AVA, the dominant soil series is the Hiwassee-Cecil association, and the Chester–Ashe series is the most common soil series to the southwest of the AVA.

== Viticulture ==
The High Country Wine Trail is the mainstay for enotourism in the Appalachian High Country viticultural area. Beginning at its eastern boundary at Watauga Lake east of Butler, Tennessee, proceeding southeast along U.S. Route 321 into North Carolina and south on NC 194, NC 105 or U.S. Route 221 is a tasting experience at the numerous wineries and vineyards.

== See also ==
- North Carolina Wine
- Tennessee Wine
- Virginia Wine
- List of wineries in Virginia
