= Tryon Foothills AVA =

American Viticultural Area in North Carolina

Coordinates: 35°19′27″N 82°07′15″W

Tryon Foothills
- Wine region
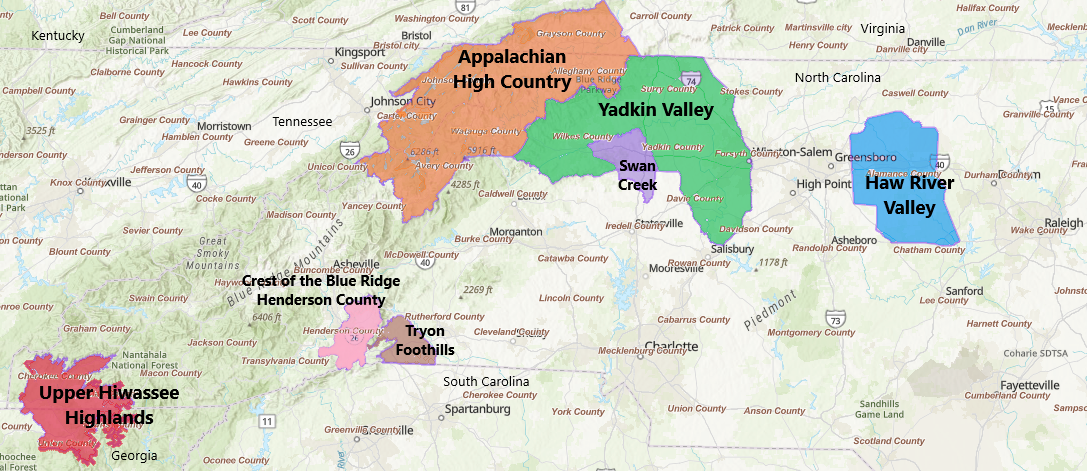
- Type: American Viticultural Area
- Year established: 2025
- Years of wine industry: 136
- Country: United States
- Part of: North Carolina
- Other regions in North Carolina: Appalachian High Country AVA, Haw River Valley AVA, Upper Hiwassee Highlands AVA, Crest of the Blue Ridge Henderson County AVA, Yadkin Valley AVA, Swan Creek AVA
- Growing season: 200–220 days
- Climate region: Region II-V
- Heat units: 3743 GDD
- Precipitation (annual average): 49 to 65 in (1,200–1,700 mm)
- Soil conditions: Clay loam
- Total area: 176 square miles (112,640 acres)
- Size of planted vineyards: 77.70 acres (31.44 ha)
- No. of vineyards: 5
- Grapes produced: Cabernet Franc, Cabernet Sauvignon, Chambourcin, Chardonnay, Malbec, Malvasia, Merlot, Muscadine, Muscat, Petit Manseng, Petit Verdot, Sauvignon Blanc, Tannat, Viognier
- No. of wineries: 4

Tryon Foothills is an American Viticultural Area (AVA) located in Polk County within Inner Piedmont region, commonly referred to as the "foothills" of the Blue Ridge Mountains, on the southwestern border of North Carolina. It was established as the nation's 277^{th} and the state's seventh wine appellation on September 29, 2025 by the Alcohol and Tobacco Tax and Trade Bureau (TTB), Treasury after reviewing the petition submitted by Cory J. Lillberg, vineyard manager of Parker–Binns Vineyard, on behalf of the vineyard and winery operators of Polk County, proposing a viticultural area known as "Tryon Foothills."

The viticultural area, named after the embedded town of Tryon, North Carolina, encompasses about 176 square miles (113,000 acres) with five vineyards cultivating approximately 77.70 planted acres (31 ha) spread throughout the appellation and four wineries within the AVA. According to the petition, the distinguishing features of the Tryon Foothills are its topography and climate.

== History ==
The name "Tryon" is widespread in Polk County, deriving from the folkloric involvement of Governor William Tryon, eighth royal governor of North Carolina (1764–1771), in the early colonial history of the region. Prior to the Revolutionary War, areas of Polk County were the home and hunting grounds of the Cherokee Nation. Because of its favorable climate, long growing season, abundant game and sparse settlement, European-American colonists began moving into the Cherokee territories in the early 18th century, where, at the beginning, they enjoyed peaceful relationships with the native population. The French and Indian War (1756–1763) brought an end to this period of peace. The French established alliances with the Cherokee, who had traditionally been loyal to the British, and encouraged hostilities against the white settlers. By 1767 relations between the Cherokee and settlers had deteriorated, compelling Governor Tryon to travel to the area to negotiate a peace treaty. A boundary line that extended from near Greenville, SC to the highest point atop White Oak Mountain near Columbus, NC was agreed on. This boundary restricted settlers to the area east of the line and the Cherokee to the west. To honor Tryon's successful negotiations, the high point atop White Oak Mountain was renamed "Tryon Peak." With the outbreak of the Revolutionary War, settlers began to violate the boundary treaty and clashes with the Cherokee ensued, resulting in the natives losing their territories and being driven west into higher mountain country. The early 19th century saw an increase of white settlement in the region, leading in 1839 to establishment of a post office at the foot of Tryon Peak. This marks the beginnings of the modern town of Tryon. As the mild, pleasant climate of the town became recognized, and with arrival of the railroad in 1877, Tryon began to evolve as a summer resort, attracting visitors from the hot, humid coastal areas of the Carolinas. By the 1890s there were six daily train stops in Tryon.

Viticulture is by no means a new activity in Polk County, which has had a long history of grape cultivation dating to the mid-19th century. In 1890 the county's Tryon township was the center of grape and wine production in western North Carolina, and in 1899 the county was ranked third in North Carolina for numbers of planted grapevines, behind Moore County (first) and Halifax (second) Counties. From the late 1800s to the mid-1900s there were an estimated 22 vineyards in the Tryon area. The coming of the railroad to Tryon in 1877 played a major role in promoting the fame of Tryon's cool summer climate and its viticultural industry. With this new form of easier, more comfortable access, the town developed into a popular summer resort destination for residents of the hot, humid lowlands, and by the 1890s, six trains a day stopped in Tryon on their runs between Spartanburg and Asheville. From the late 1890s through the mid-1900s grape vendors greeted these daily trains to sell the popular "Tryon Grapes." These delicacies became so popular and well known that they were featured on the menu of the Waldorf Astoria Hotel in New York City. But by the late 1960s, the decline in rail travel and expansion of viticulture in California, which was producing and shipping less perishable and more desired grape varieties, Tryon's vineyards had declined and disappeared.

The modern era of viticulture in Polk County began in 1991 when Lee Griffin and his wife Marsha Cassedy planted a small vineyard for their personal use. When it became obvious the vineyard was successful, the couple decided to expand it and add a winery. Their 10-acre (4.0 ha) Rockhouse Vineyard was a successful operation until 2012 when Mr. Griffin, who was the winemaker, was diagnosed with throat cancer and was unable to judge the taste of his wines after treatment. The vineyard continued to grow and sell grapes until 2020 when the vines were removed and the vineyard was permanently closed. In 1998, Joe and Jeanne Mize planted a nearly 30-acre (12 ha) vineyard in the Green Creek community of Polk County. That operation is still going and was the impetus for the founding of several other vineyards. Today there are five well-established vineyards in Polk County; four of these have wineries that are open to the public, and one only sell its grapes for wine production by other operators.

== Terroir ==
=== Topography ===
Tryon Foothills viticultural area is located on the western edge of the Inner Piedmont region of the Blue Ridge Mountains. The petition describes the Inner Piedmont as a region of low mountains and rolling hills. The average elevation within the area is 988 ft (301 m), while the maximum elevation is 1,656 feet (505 m) and the minimum is 712 feet (217 m). To the west and northwest of the AVA are the Blue Ridge Escarpment and the Blue Ridge Plateau. The petition describes the Blue Ridge Escarpment as steep and rugged, while the Blue Ridge Plateau is an elevated massif of basins and ranges that constitutes the bulk of the Blue Ridge Mountains. Elevations in both of these regions are significantly higher than within the proposed AVA, with average elevations of 2,584 and 2,649 feet (788 and 807 m), respectively. The region to the northeast of the AVA is also higher, with an average elevation of 1,652 feet (504 m). This region consists of portions of the Blue Ridge Escarpment and the Inner Piedmont, as well as the South Mountains. Elevations immediately east of the proposed AVA in the Inner Piedmont region are higher but then decline as the Inner Piedmont region gives way to the Carolina Superterrane. The average elevation east of the AVA is 987 feet (301 m), while the maximum is 2,968 feet (905 m) and the minimum is 567 feet (173 m). South of the AVA is a continuation of the Inner Piedmont region, but the elevations are generally lower than within the AVA. The average elevation south of the AVA is 880 feet (270 m), while the maximum and minimum elevations are 3,341 feet (1,018 m) and 390 feet (120 m), respectively. According to the petition, the AVA's topography contributes to the creation of a thermal belt. At night, warm air that has accumulated at high elevations loses its heat by conductive radiation. The air becomes cooler and heavier and begins to sink to lower elevations. As the cool air sinks, it displaces the warmer air at lower elevations. The warm air settles on the mountain slopes above the cascading cooler air and creates a warmer layer of air above the cooler air. This warmer ayer is known as a thermal belt. Within the proposed Tryon Foothills AVA, the thermal belt results in warmer temperatures than are found in the surrounding regions.

=== Climate ===
The favorable climate of the Tryon area is due in large measure to its location in the famous Thermal Belt, (sometimes referred to as the "Isothermal Belt"), a climatic zone that is commonly thought to exist in Polk and adjacent Rutherford County. Temperatures in this zone are consistently milder year-round, providing a longer growing season for crops than in surrounding areas. This climatic phenomenon, along with well-drained mountain slopes, southern hillside exposure, and deep, rocky soils provides an ideal "terroir" for grape cultivation. Starting in the 1890s and continuing until the mid-1940's vineyards flourished, and the area became famous for its "Tryon grapes" as travelers came through the Polk County railroad station in the town of Tryon.

The climate of Tryon Foothills AVA differs from that of the surrounding regions, the petition includes information on the average annual temperatures, average growing season temperatures, average growing season length, and average annual growing degree day 6 (GDD) accumulations for locations within the proposed AVA and the surrounding regions. The petition also included average annual and growing season precipitation amounts for the proposed AVA and the surrounding regions. All data was collected using the 1980–2010 climate normals.

The petition states that, in general, the regions to the west, northwest, and northeast of the proposed AVA are cooler and have a greater range of average temperatures than the proposed AVA. The region south of the proposed AVA is warmer, as temperatures grow progressively warmer the farther south one travels from the proposed AVA. The proposed AVA and the region to the east have approximately the same average annual temperatures, but the region to the east has a lower average minimum temperature. The petition also categorizes average growing season temperatures according to the Winegrape Climate/Maturity Groupings classification system. Although a percentage of each of the regions fall into the "Hot" category, the proposed Tryon Foothills AVA is entirely within the "Hot" category, indicating a warmer growing season than the surrounding regions. According to the classification system, "Hot" regions are most suitable for growing varietals of grapes such as Zinfandel, Grenache, and Cabernet Sauvignon. The petition included information on the average length of the growing season for the locations within the proposed AVA and the surrounding regions. Within each region there are a range of growing seasons based primarily on elevation. Although each region has a percentage of land within the 200–210 day growing season range, the proposed AVA has the largest percentage of land within this range. Each of the surrounding regions also contains lands that have growing seasons that are as short as 170 days, while the shortest growing season length within the proposed AVA is between 190 and 200 days. To further demonstrate the warm climate of the proposed Tryon Foothills AVA, the petition provided information on the GDDs of the proposed AVA and the surrounding regions. The proposed AVA has a larger percentage of land classified as Region V than any of the surrounding regions, except the region to the south. Unlike each of the surrounding regions, the proposed AVA lacks land classified as Region III or lower. Finally, the petition included information on the average annual and growing season precipitation amounts for the proposed AVA and surrounding regions. With respect to annual precipitation amounts, the proposed AVA has higher average amounts than each of the surrounding regions except the region to the west, lower maximum amounts than each region except those to the northeast and east, and higher minimum amounts than each of the surrounding regions. For growing season precipitation amounts, the proposed AVA has higher minimum amounts than each of the surrounding regions, higher average amounts than each of the surrounding regions except the region to the west, and maximum amounts lower than each region except the regions to the northeast and east. According to the petition, the ideal growing season precipitation amount for mature grapevines is 24 to 30 inches. Excessive growing season precipitation can promote excess vigor and fungal diseases and attracts pests. Insufficient growing season precipitation can result in reduced photosynthesis, cell desiccation, and potential death of the grapevines. The USDA plant hardiness zone is 8a.
