= Appalachian High Country AVA =

American Viticultural Area in Virginia and West Virginia

Coordinates: 36°11′25″N 81°50′26″W

Appalachian High Country
- Wine region
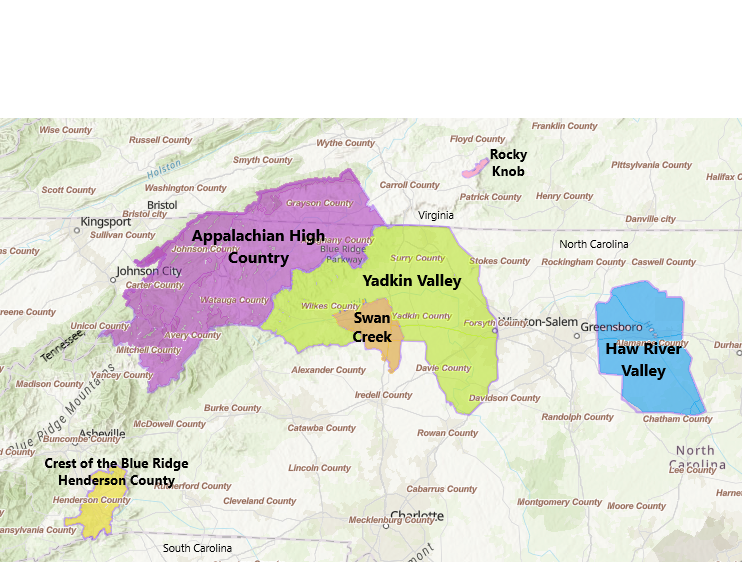
- Type: American Viticultural Area
- Year established: 2016
- Country: United States
- Part of: North Carolina, Tennessee, Virginia
- Other regions in North Carolina, Tennessee, Virginia: Crest of the Blue Ridge Henderson County AVA, Rocky Knob AVA, Swan Creek AVA, Upper Hiwassee Highlands AVA, Yadkin Valley AVA, Upper Cumberland AVA, Tryon Foothills AVA, Nine Lakes of East Tennessee AVA
- Growing season: 139.2 days
- Climate region: Regions I-II
- Heat units: 2,635 GDD units
- Precipitation (annual average): 48.6 in (1,234.4 mm)
- Soil conditions: Tusquitee-Edneyville series; Granite and gneiss with fine loam
- Total area: 1.5 million acres (2,400 sq mi)
- No. of vineyards: 20
- Grapes produced: Cabernet Franc, Merlot, Frontenac, Marechal Foch, Marquette, Pinot Noir, Riesling, Seyval Blanc, Traminette, Vidal Blanc and Viognier
- No. of wineries: 10

Appalachian High Country (/ˌæp.əˈleɪ.tʃən/ ap-uh-LATCH-uhn) is an American Viticultural Area (AVA) located mainly in North Carolina with sections in Tennessee and Virginia. The approximately 1.5-million-acre (2,400 sq mi) viticultural area encompasses all or portions of the following counties: Alleghany, Ashe, Avery, Mitchell, and Watauga Counties in North Carolina; Carter County and Johnson Counties in Tennessee; and Grayson County in Virginia. It was established as the nation's 239^{th}, North Carolina's fifth, Tennessee's second and Virginia's eighth appellation on October 27, 2016 by the Alcohol and Tobacco Tax and Trade Bureau (TTB), Treasury after reviewing the petition submitted by Johnnie James, owner of Bethel Valley Farms, on behalf of members of the High Country Wine Growers Association, proposing the viticultural area named "Appalachian High Country."

The establishment of the Appalachian High Country AVA does not affect any existing AVA and will allow vintners to use "Appalachian High Country" as an appellation of origin for wines made primarily from grapes grown within the Appalachian High Country if the wines meet the eligibility TTB requirements for the appellation.

== Topography ==
The topography of the Appalachian High Country AVA, is located within the Appalachian Mountains, is characterized by high elevations and steep slopes. Elevations within the AVA range from 1,338 feet (408 m) to over 6,000 feet (1,800 m) with most vineyards planted at elevations between 2,290 and 4,630 feet (700–1,410 m). The high elevations expose vineyards to high amounts of solar irradiance, which promotes grape maturation and compensates for low temperatures and a short growing season. The average slope angle within the AVA is 35.9 degrees, and most vineyards are planted on slopes with angles of 30 degrees or greater. Because of the steep slopes, many of the vineyards within the AVA are terraced to prevent erosion and vineyard work is performed manually rather than with machinery. The regions surrounding the AVA all have lower average elevations as well as smaller average slope angles, except for the region to the southwest, which has a slightly greater average slope angle.

== Climate ==
Appalachian High Country is characterized by a cool climate and a short growing season. The average annual temperature within the area is 51.5 °F (10.8 °C). The AVA accumulates an average of 2,635 growing degree days (GDD) during the growing season, which is approximately 139.2 days long. Because of the cool climate and short growing season, the region is suitable for growing cold-hardy grape varietals such as Marquette, Vidal Blanc, and Frontenac, which do not have a lengthy maturation time. By contrast, the regions surrounding the AVA have warmer temperatures, longer growing seasons, and higher growing degree accumulations, making these regions more suitable for growing grape varietals that require warmer temperatures and a longer maturation time. The USDA plant hardiness zones range from 6a to 8a.

== Soil ==
The soils of Appalachian High Country are derived from igneous and metamorphic rocks such as granite and gneiss. All of the common soil series within the AVA are described as deep, well-drained soils with a fine, loamy texture. The well-drained soils help reduce the risk of rot and fungus in the grapevines. Organic matter comprises up to 14 percent of the soils within the AVA, providing an excellent source of nutrients for vineyards. The most prevalent soil series is the Tusquitee-Edneyville, which covers approximately 24 percent of the AVA. By contrast, in the surrounding regions, other soil series are more prominent. To the northeast of the AVA, the Hayesville series is the most common soil series, and the Frederick–Carbo soil series is most commonly found in the region northwest of the AVA. Southeast of the AVA, the dominant soil series is the Hiwassee-Cecil association, and the Chester–Ashe series is the most common soil series to the southwest of the AVA.

== See also ==
- North Carolina Wine
- Tennessee Wine
- Virginia Wine
- List of wineries in Virginia
