= Nine Lakes of East Tennessee AVA =

Viticultural area in Tennessee

Coordinates: 36°11′21″N 85°36′45″W

Nine Lakes of East Tennessee
- Wine region
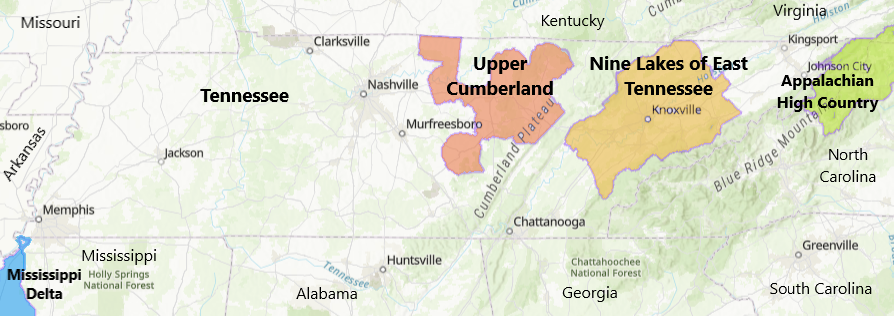
- Tennessee AVAs
- Type: American Viticultural Area
- Year established: 2026
- Years of wine industry: 42
- Country: United States
- Part of: Tennessee
- Other regions in Tennessee: Appalachian High Country AVA, Upper Cumberland AVA, Mississippi Delta AVA
- Growing season: 212.8 days
- Climate region: Region IV
- Heat units: 3,837 GDD units
- Precipitation (annual average): 51.09 inches (1,297.7 mm)
- Soil conditions: Ultisols soil order with clay-enriched subsoil
- Total area: 2.6 million acres (4,064 sq mi)
- Size of planted vineyards: 232 acres (94 ha)
- No. of vineyards: 32
- Grapes produced: Cabernet Sauvignon, Catawba, Cayuga, Chambourcin, Chardonnay, Concord, Corot noir, Cynthiana, Merlot, Noiret, Muscadine, Muscato, Niagara, Norton, Noiret, Petit Manseng, Pinot Gris, Petit Verdot, Riesling, Sangiovese, Steuben, Syrah, Touriga, Traminette, Vidal Blanc, Zinfandel
- No. of wineries: 29

Nine Lakes of East Tennessee is an American Viticultural Area (AVA) located in East Tennessee and expands across all or portions of the following fourteen counties: Anderson, Blount, Campbell, Claiborne, Cocke, Grainger, Hamblen, Jefferson, Knox, Loudon, Monroe, Roane, Sevier and Union Counties. It was established as the nation's 279th and the state's fourth appellation by the Alcohol and Tobacco Tax and Trade Bureau (TTB), Treasury on March 24, 2026, after reviewing the petition submitted by Patricia McRitchie on behalf of the Appalachian Region Wine Producers Association proposing the viticultural area named "Nine Lakes of East Tennessee."

The approximately 2.6-million-acre (4,064 sq mi) appellation lies between the Appalachian High Country and Upper Cumberland AVAs encircling the city of Knoxville. At the outset, there resides 29 wineries sourcing from 32 vineyards spread across all but two counties cultivating over 232 acres (94 ha) under vine. The Nine Lakes wine region sits in the Valley and Ridge Province of eastern Tennessee surrounding nine lakes formed by the Tennessee Valley Authority (TVA) dams along the Tennessee River.

== Name Evidence ==
The state of Tennessee is divided into three main regions: East, Middle and West. These divisions are so distinct that they were constitutionally mandated in the early 1900s. Nine Lakes of East Tennessee AVA is located entirely in East Tennessee that is further divided into three geographic regions. From east to west the regions are: the Blue Ridge Mountains, the Valley and Ridge Province, and the Cumberland Plateau region. The viticultural area entirely lies within the Valley and Ridge Province. This area is characterized by very long linear valleys paralleled by ridges, all running in a northeast to southwest direction and elevations between 700 and 1,200 feet (213 and 366 m).

The Valley and Ridge Province is geographically distinct from both the Cumberland Plateau and the Blue Ridge Mountains as discussed in detail in the petition. In general, flat-topped mountains and valleys characterize the Cumberland Plateau with elevations ranging from 1,500 feet (457 m) to over 2,000 feet (610 m). The Blue Ridge Mountains are densely forested, with rugged terrain and the highest elevations in the state.

The entire state of Tennessee lies within the drainage of the Mississippi River. The Nine Lakes of East Tennessee AVA lies entirely within the watershed of the Tennessee River or its tributaries. The Tennessee River is formed by the juncture of the Holston and French Broad Rivers at Knoxville, within the Nine Lakes of East Tennessee region. The Tennessee River flows southwesterly along the Alabama-Mississippi borderline then cuts northward across Tennessee into Kentucky. Major tributaries of the Tennessee River within the Nine Lakes of East Tennessee region include the Clinch, Little Tennessee, Hiawassee, Elk, and Duck Rivers.

The nine lakes formed when the Tennessee Valley Authority dammed the rivers according to the Tennessee Valley Authority Act as part of President Franklin D. Roosevelt's New Deal, enacted in 1933. The purpose of the Act was to resolve issues plaguing the valley such as flooding, reforestation, and electricity production. These lakes gave rise to the name "Nine Lakes" to refer to this area.

Nine Lakes AVA is located within an area that has historically been known as the "Great Valley of East Tennessee" (the entire area of the Valley and Ridge Province). However, the Great Valley of East Tennessee encompasses a far greater area than that proposed for the Nine Lakes of East Tennessee AVA. It encompasses the southern part of the Valley and Ridge Province as well as parts of the northern part of the Valley and Ridge Province, areas climatically and geographically distinct from the proposed AVA and in some areas unsuitable or unavailable for viticulture. The Nine Lakes of East Tennessee only includes the area around the nine lakes created by the TVA. For these reasons Nine Lakes of East Tennessee is a more appropriate, succinct, and descriptive name for the region.

== History ==
Tennessee has a long history of habitation. The unique geography of Tennessee dictated the pattern of settlement. The region's first inhabitants were nomadic Paleo-Indians hunters between 12,000 and 15,000 years ago. Their descendants settled on the many river terraces located throughout the state then expanded outward establishing permanent settlements which reached a peak of prehistoric cultural development between 700 and 1300 AD. The first migrant explorers arrived in 1540 initiating a period of European exploration and exploitation. For over two hundred years the indigenous populations co-existed with the small numbers of settlers, frontiersmen, and explorers in the Upper Cumberland area. The use of the name "Cumberland" came from an English explorer Thomas Watson who named the Cumberland River after the Duke of Cumberland in 1750, and it soon became an oft-used name for geographic entities, including the Cumberland Plateau and the region known as Upper Cumberland. The dramatic change occurred after 1775 when Daniel Boone established a route, the Wilderness Road, between the eastern and western United States via the Cumberland Gap, a passageway through the Cumberland Mountains between Kentucky and Tennessee. The Wilderness Road forked soon after the Gap, with the southern route leading directly into the Upper Cumberland. These first settlers in the Upper Cumberland region came from Virginia and North Carolina and were primarily of English and Scotch-Irish ancestry.

Agriculture was the driving force in the settlement and development of Tennessee and the Upper Cumberland. The vast majority of immigrants to the state of Tennessee during the late eighteenth century and early nineteenth century were in search of a better life and the route to this life was exploitation of the rich farming potential of the region. Tennessee's eastern valleys of the Tennessee and Holston River systems were some of the first areas settled. Tennessee is perhaps better known for "moonshine," or whiskey. In 1886, the Nashville Daily Union reported that the distilling industry was the largest manufacturing industry in the state of Tennessee, annually consuming 750,000 bushels of corn and 500,000 bushels of apples and peaches. Both East and Middle Tennessee were well suited for the production of whiskey, having good soil for growing corn, an abundance of firewood, white oak for the manufacture of barrels, and a good network of rivers upon which to ship the whiskey to marketing centers like Knoxville, Chattanooga, Nashville, Memphis, and beyond. European settlers were quick to introduce grape growing and wine-making to Tennessee. In 1880, the Tennessee Department of Agriculture estimated there were 1,128 acres (456 ha) of grapes growing in the state. Mark Twain, in his autobiography, reminisces about his father's estate in Upper Cumberland region round about Jamestown, which "produced a wild grape of a promising sort." Those grapes were sent to a renowned vintner in Ohio who opined "that[they] would make as good wine as his Catawbas." However, as in all states, Prohibition slowed or halted grape production in Tennessee.

The TVA dams of the Tennessee and Cumberland River systems and the lakes so formed, in addition to vastly reducing flood damage have facilitated water transportation, provided abundant low cost hydroelectric power and created extensive recreation areas. Fishing, boating, swimming and camping along the many lakes, together with the several state and national parks, have made tourism a major industry in the region. It has also fostered a burgeoning vineyard and winery industry where viticulture rebounded in the later decades of the 20th century.

In 1980, the first post-Prohibition wineries were licensed and the first modern winery in Tennessee, Highland Manor Winery, is located in Upper Cumberland AVA. By 2015, Tennessee was estimated to have over 1,000 acres (405 ha) of grapes and around 70 wineries. The epicenter of the Tennessee wine industry is in the Nine Lakes AVA with 232 acres (94 ha) vineyards and 29 wineries located in every but two of its fourteen counties. Although modern wine-making is recent, Nine Lakes region is an area successfully growing a wide variety of grapes and producing wines characteristic of the region. Muscadine, hybrid, vinifera and native grapes are all grown and its wines have garnered awards effectively utilizing available information regarding climate, soils, and topography to determine the best sites and varieties for their vineyards. New growers are looking to the region as an area where successful cultivation of a broad variety of wine grapes can successfully be grown.

== Terroir ==
=== Topography ===
The Nine Lakes of East Tennessee AVA is within the Valley and Ridge geologic province and is characterized by very long linear valleys paralleled by ridges, all running northeast to southwest. Within the AVA, elevations range between 1,100 to 1,500 feet (335–457 m) in the ridges and 700 to 1,000 feet (213–305 m) in the valleys. The Valley and Ridge Province continues to the north and south of the AVA. However, the petition notes that elevations in the northern portion of the Valley and Ridge Province are higher than within the AVA, and elevations in the southern portion of the province are lower. East of the AVA are the Blue Ridge Mountains, with elevations between 1,000 to 6,643 feet (305–2,025 m). West of the AVA is the Cumberland Plateau and Cumberland Escarpment, which have average elevations between 1,500 to 1,800 feet (457–549 m). According to the petition, the AVA's location between higher elevations to the east and west have an effect on climate, which is discussed in more detail in the following section.

=== Climate ===
Due to the influence of elevation, the Nine Lakes of East Tennessee AVA is generally warmer than all surrounding regions except the region to the south. In general, temperatures decrease an average of 3 °F (−16 °C) for every 1,000 feet (305 m) in elevation, meaning that the higher-elevation regions to the north, east, and west of the AVA can be expected to have generally cooler climates than the AVA. The regions to the south and southwest of the AVA, which have lower elevations, are generally warmer than the AVA. The petition describes the AVA's climate as "well-suited to growing a wide variety of wine grapes, including vinifera, hybrid, native, and Muscadine varietals." The petition notes that grape varietals grown in warm climates, like that of the AVA, generally produce "bigger, bolder wines with higher alcohol, soft acidity, a fuller body, and more dark or lush fruit flavors." By contrast, grapes grown in cooler climates often produce wines "that are more subtle with lower alcohol, crisp acidity, a lighter body, and typically bright fruit flavors." To support the climate claims, the petition includes data on the growing season length, average maximum and minimum temperatures, growing degree days (GDDs), USDA plant hardiness zones, and precipitation amounts for the AVA and each of the surrounding regions. The petition gathered data from 12 weather stations within the AVA and 16 weather stations outside the AVA. The data included in the petition, summarize the climate data for the locations within the AVA and the surrounding regions. The USDA plant hardiness zone range is 7a to 7b.

=== Geology ===
The geology of the Nine Lakes of East Tennessee AVA consists almost entirely of sedimentary rocks initially deposited during the Paleozoic era, when an ocean covered much of eastern North America. The bedrock consists of alternating beds of limestone, dolomite, shale, and sandstone. As the African tectonic plate and the North American tectonic plate collided, the sediments and rock between them folded and fractured, resulting in the southwest-to-northeast orientation of the ridges and valleys within the AVA. The petition states that this orientation of the ridges and valleys provides vineyard owners the ability to select locations with slope aspects which allow for first light on the vineyards to dry the heavy dew and thus help in disease prevention. Additionally, the slope aspects shade the vines from the evening sun and thus prevent excessive heat on the grape clusters.

The petition states that the geology to the north and south of the AVA is similar to that of the AVA, given that all three locations are within the Valley and Ridge Province. To the east of the AVA is the Appalachian Mountain system, which is composed of Lower Paleozoic limestone, dolomite, and shale with exposures of Precambrian igneous and metamorphic basement rocks such as tuff, rhyolite, granite, schist, and quartzite, as well as Precambrian sedimentary and metamorphic sandstone, conglomerate, arkose, and siltstone. To the west of the AVA are the Cumberland Plateau and Cumberland Escarpment, which are the results of the continental collisions uplifting highly resistant caprock of Pennsylvanian age sandstone and conglomerate.

=== Soils ===
The soils of the Nine Lakes of East Tennessee AVA are categorized in the Ultisols soil order. According to the petition, soils of this order are characterized as "strongly leached, acid forest soils with low native fertility" and have clay-enriched subsoil. Because of the acidity and low fertility of the soils, the petition states that timely application of fertilizer and lime in vineyards are important in maximizing grape yields. The depth of these soils ranges from shallow on the sandstone and shale ridges to very deep in the valleys and on large limestone formations. The soils have an udic soil moisture regime, meaning that the amount of stored moisture plus rainfall is approximately equal to or exceeds the amount of evapotranspiration. The soil temperature is predominantly thermic, meaning that at a depth of 20 inches (508 mm), the soils have an average annual temperature of 59 to 72 °F (15–22 °C). To the north and south of the AVA, the soils are similar, because all three regions are in the Valley and Ridge Province. To the east of the AVA, in the Blue Ridge Mountains, soils are commonly well-drained and acidic and can be shallow to very deep. The primary soil order is Inceptisols (which lack significant clay accumulation in the subsoils) and, to a significantly lesser extent, Ultisols. The soils have an udic soil moisture regime, and the soil temperature regime is mesic (average annual soil temperature of 47 to 59 °F (8–15 °C)) or frigid (average annual soil temperature lower than 46.4 °F (8 °C). West of the AVA, in the Cumberland Plateau and Cumberland Escarpment, the main soil orders are Inceptisols and Ultisols with a thermic or mesic soil temperature regime and an udic soil moisture regime.

== See also ==
- Tennessee Wine
