= Haw River Valley AVA =

American Viticultural Area in North Carolina

Coordinates: 35°55′37″N 79°18′30″W

Haw River Valley
- Wine region
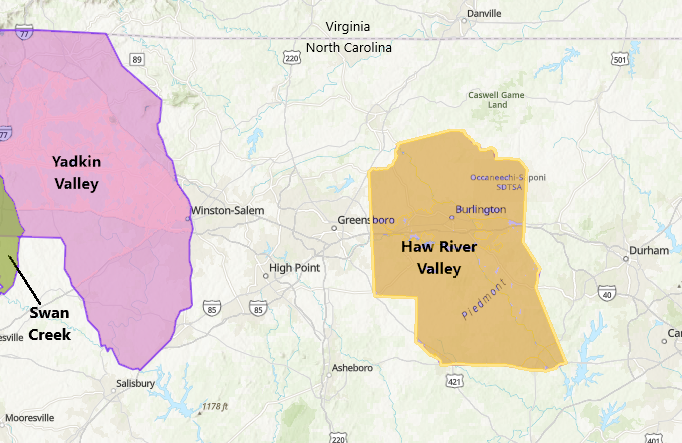
- Type: American Viticultural Area
- Year established: 2009
- Years of wine industry: 128
- Country: United States
- Part of: North Carolina
- Other regions in North Carolina: Yadkin Valley AVA, Swan Creek AVA, Upper Hiwassee Highlands AVA, Appalachian High Country AVA, Crest of the Blue Ridge Henderson County AVA
- Growing season: 214 days
- Climate region: Region IV & V
- Precipitation (annual average): 45.27 in (1,149.86 mm) snow: 5.9 in (149.9 mm)
- Soil conditions: Saprolite, weathered from igneous, intermediate and mafic intrusive rocks, felsic and intermediate volcanic rocks
- Total area: 868 sq mi (555,520 acres)
- Size of planted vineyards: 60 acres (24 ha)
- No. of vineyards: 40
- Grapes produced: Cabernet Franc, Cabernet Sauvignon, Chardonnay, Syrah, Tempranillo, Valdepenas, Muscadine
- No. of wineries: 6

Haw River Valley is an American Viticultural Area (AVA) in North Carolina, United States. It was established as the nation's 192^{nd} and the state's third appellation on March 30, 2009 by the Alcohol and Tobacco Tax and Trade Bureau (TTB), Treasury after reviewing the petition submitted by Patricia McRitchie of McRitchie Associates, LLC, on behalf of its local grape growers and winemakers, proposing a viticultural area named "Haw River Valley."

The AVA was established after Yadkin Valley and Swan Creek viticultural areas within the Yadkin Valley region. Haw River Valley covers the northern, central portion of the state encompassing 868 square miles (555,520 acres) centered around the city of Burlington and bisected by the Haw River. The appellation expands across all or portions of Alamance, Caswell, Chatham, Guilford, Orange, and Rockingham Counties being accessible between the state's largest metropolitan areas of Greensboro to the west, and Durham-Raleigh to the east on Interstate 40.

== History ==
The "Haw" name originated with the Sissipahaw Indians living in small villages along the Haw River. After the arrival of the first Europeans in the 16th century, the Sissipahaws eventually abandoned their villages along the Haw River and joined indigenous tribes in other parts of the North Carolina Piedmont. The "Haw River" and "Haw River Valley" names both have been used in reference to the geological region of the viticultural area. In the early 1700s John Lawson, an English naturalist and surveyor, wrote an account of his party crossing the "famous Hau-River" to get a safe distance from the Sissipahaw Indians. The names "Hawfields" and "Haw River Settlement" reference the earliest colonial settlements in the Haw River Valley. Haw River Valley had a pre-Prohibition viticulture industry, when North Carolina produced the most wine than any other state, centered on its native Muscadine vine. However, North Carolina voted to become a dry state in 1908 and coupled with the onset of Prohibition in 1920, ended wine-making in North Carolina. Vineyards were uprooted in favor of tobacco and soybeans which became the cash crops renown in the state throughout the 20th Century. Repeal in 1933, followed by the passage by North Carolina's legislature in 1935 of laws permitting wine-making, began a rebirth, but it was several decades before North Carolina's wine industry would show significant growth. When the tobacco market waned in the 90s, viticulture made a resurgence in the valley the last quarter century as the rest of North Carolina.

== Terroir ==
The boundary of the Haw River Valley viticultural area is outlines the Haw River watershed and its distinctive underlying geology and soil. The Haw River is approximately 110 mi (177 km) long, and the viticultural area includes the portion of the Haw River between Williamsburg and Griffins Crossroad, a town located approximately 2.5 mi (4.0 km) northwest of Everett Jordan Lake. The Haw River headwaters start northwest of Greensboro, and the river travels east and south-southeast, gaining momentum in the Piedmont region. The river eventually flows into the Everett Jordan Lake in Chatham County, joins the Deep River south of the Everett Jordan Lake dam, and then flows into the Cape Fear River. The urban, non-agricultural Greensboro region lies close to, but outside of, the northwestern portion of the boundary. Also, differing geology, soils, and elevations distinguish the Haw River watershed from the Dan River watershed to the north, the Inner Coastal Province to the east, the Sandhills to the south, and the western Piedmont Province to the west. According to the petitioner, the distinguishing features of the Haw River Valley viticultural area include its geology, soils, elevation, and climate. The combination of the underlying geology of the Haw River Valley and its inland, non-mountainous geography influences the soils and the climate and creates a unique grape-growing region.

=== Topography ===
The elevations in the Haw River Valley viticultural area range from 350 ft (107 m) at the southeastern boundary corner to over 800 ft (244 m) at the northwestern boundary corner, according to elevation maps by John Boyer (Virginia Polytechnic Institute and State University, 2001) that the North Carolina Grape Council provided. The four physio-graphic regions of North Carolina are the eastern Outer Coastal Plain, the Inner Coastal Plain, the central Piedmont Province, and the western Blue Ridge Province, as shown on the Physiography of North Carolina map by M.A. Medina et al. (North Carolina Geological Survey, Division of Land Resources, 2004). The Haw River Valley region lies in the Piedmont Province near the demarcation of the fall line with the Inner Coastal Plain, according to "History and Environment of North Carolina's Piedmont Evolution of a Value-Added Society," by John Rogers (University of North Carolina, Department of Geology, 1999). Areas near the fall zone vary from 300 to 600 ft (91–183 m) in elevation, in contrast with the approximately 1,500 ft (457 m) elevation at the foot of the Blue Ridge Mountains, as shown on the Boyer maps. The Piedmont Province consists of generally rolling, well rounded hills and ridges with a difference in elevation of a few hundred feet between the hills and valleys. The Inner Coastal Plain, which has stair-step planar terraces that dip gently toward the ocean, ranges from 25 to 600 ft (8–183 m) in elevation.

=== Geology ===
The Piedmont and Blue Ridge Provinces share a geologic history dating back to the formation of the continental landmasses. The mountain building of the region is attributed to plate tectonics, the spectrum of uplifting and erosion. Long-term erosion has reduced the mountains to lower, more level terrains that gently slope toward the ocean. The Piedmont and Coastal Plain landforms are part of the erosional leveling process of the third global tectonic cycle. The rock units in the Haw River Valley region date back approximately 700 million years. In contrast, the age of the rock units of the Yadkin Valley region, in the western part of the Piedmont Province, date back approximately 1.5 billion years. The Haw River Valley region, including its rock units, is the geological result of volcanic metamorphism and igneous activity stemming from island arcs. Island arcs form when a continental plate overrides an oceanic plate, resulting in subduction zones that create volcanoes. In the northeastern part of the viticultural area a caldera formed in an area of formerly intense volcanic activity. The caldera collapsed into a 36 by 9 mi (58 by 14 km) ellipse-shaped area that igneous rock eventually filled.

Haw River Valley viticultural area lies in the Carolina Slate Belt, a result of tectonic movements of the North American and African continental plates. The slate belt trends to the northwest and disappears under the Carolina Coastal Plain, which extends southeast and eventually dips under the Atlantic Ocean. The major rock types in the Haw River Valley include the following: Porpyritic Granite/Felsic Intrusive Complex, Felsic Gneiss, Mafic Volcanics, Felsic Volcanics, Intermediate Intrusive Rocks, Mica Gneiss, and Mica Schist (Muscovite and/or Biotite). The Haw River Valley igneous and metamorphic rocks, composed of magma, differ from those rocks formed from magma in the western Piedmont and Appalachian Mountains.

=== Climate ===
The climatic features that distinguish the Haw River Valley viticultural area are precipitation, air temperature, and growing season. Haw River Valley has more moderate temperatures and greater precipitation than those in the surrounding areas outside the boundary line. The climate within the Haw River Valley, which is generally similar throughout, varies from the surrounding regions outside the viticultural area, according to data obtained from the Southeast Regional Climate Center (SRCC) and from horticultural information leaflets by Katharine Perry (North Carolina State University, revised December 1998). The data from SRCC includes those from stations within and outside the boundary line of the Haw River Valley viticultural area. The table below lists the SRCC weather stations consulted and the direction and distance of the location of each weather station in relation to the Haw River Valley. The air temperatures in the Haw River Valley region are generally warmer than those in the area to the north, cooler than those in the areas to the south and east, and similar to those in the area to the west on the Piedmont Province, the petitioner explains using SRCC data. The annual frost-free growing season of the Haw River Valley viticultural area runs from April 1 to November 1 and totals 214 days. The growing season is 2 to 4 weeks longer than that for the region to the west, and is similar to those for the regions to the immediate south and to the east of the boundary line. The growing season length and frost-free dates fall within the parameters for successful viticulture of vinifera, hybrid, and Muscadine grapes, according to the "Analysis for Viticultural Suitability in North Carolina," a map prepared by John Boyer (Virginia Polytechnic Institute and State University, 2001). The USDA plant hardiness zones range from 7b to 8a.

=== Soil ===
The soils of Haw River Valley viticultural area, compared to those of the surrounding regions, have unique and distinguishable characteristics. Most of the soils in Haw River Valley are acidic and low in natural fertility. The viticultural area is entirely in the udic soil moisture regime. (The udic moisture regime is common to soils of humid climates with well-distributed rainfall or with enough rain in summer that the amount of stored moisture plus rainfall is approximately equal to, or exceeds, the amount of evapotranspiration. In most years, at some time during the year water moves down through the soil.) Further, the viticultural area lies dominantly in the thermic soil temperature regime, averaging 59 to 72 °F (15–22 °C) at a soil depth of 20 inches (51 cm). The soils in the viticultural area formed primarily in residuum, or saprolite, weathered from igneous, intermediate, and mafic intrusive rocks and in felsic and intermediate volcanic rocks of the Carolina Slate Belt. In the central portion of the Haw River Valley viticultural area, the soils formed in residuum from mafic intrusive rocks. In these areas the soils have a clayey subsoil of mixed mineralogy and slightly better natural fertility than that of the soils to the east and south. The Mecklenburg soils are on nearly level and moderately steep uplands. These soils have moderately slow permeability. The Enon and Iredell soils are on uplands and some side slopes. These soils have a clayey subsoil, and they have a high or very high shrink-swell potential, respectively; because of these properties, they have poor internal drainage and perch water during wet periods. In the western and northeastern portions of the viticultural area, the soils formed mainly in igneous and intermediate intrusive rocks. In these areas the Cecil, Appling, Vance, Helena, and Sedgefield soils are dominant. Typically, these soils are deep and have a clayey subsoil. Also scattered throughout these areas are the Enon and Iredell soils formed in mafic, intrusive rocks. In the northwesternmost portion of the viticultural area, the soils formed in residuum derived from metamorphic rocks. In this area the Fairview, Clifford, Toast, and Rasalo soils on nearly level to steep uplands are dominant. Further, except for the Rasalo soils, these soils are very deep and well drained, and have a clayey subsoil, moderate permeability, and good internal structure. In the Rasalo soils, because of high shrinking and swelling in the clayey subsoil and slow permeability, the soils tend to perch water during wet periods. In the eastern and southern portions of the Haw River Valley and in parts of the southwestern and northwestern portions, the soils formed primarily in residuum derived from felsic and intermediate volcanic rocks. In these areas the Georgeville and Herndon soils are very deep and well drained, and have a loamy surface layer, a clayey subsoil, moderate permeability, and good internal structure. These soils are on gently sloping to moderately steep uplands. Also in these areas are the Callison, Secrest, and Kirksey soils. These soils are moderately well drained and have a loamy surface layer and subsoil. These soils are on level flats and gently sloping upland ridge of depressions, and around heads of drains. They vary in depth depending on the underlying soft and hard bedrock; consequently, they have poor internal drainage and perch water during wet periods. The soils weathered from rocks within Haw River Valley viticultural area have significant differences compared to the soils in the surrounding areas to the east, west, and south. However, they are similar to the soils in the surrounding north portion and in the northwesternmost portion of the viticultural area. East of Haw River Valley viticultural area, on the Inner Coastal Plain, the soils, predominantly Udults, have a thermic temperature regime, an udic moisture regime, a loamy or sandy surface layer, and a loamy or clayey subsoil. The soils are generally deep and well drained to poorly drained, and maintain adequate moisture during the viticultural growing season. West of the Haw River Valley viticultural area, most soils formed in saprolite weathered from igneous intrusive rocks and some gneisses and schists of the Charlotte Belt. However, some soils formed in residuum derived from intrusions of mafic rocks and have a clay subsoil of mixed mineralogy. The Gaston and Mecklenburg soils have moderate or moderately slow permeability and are moderately suitable for viticulture. The Enon and Iredell soils are also west of the viticultural area. According to "Scientists Study Why More Storms Form in the Sandhills in the Summer," a news release dated July 5, 2001, from North Carolina State University, the soils are deep and sandy in the Sandhills region south of the Haw River Valley viticultural area. Unlike the clay soils in the Piedmont, these soils, like the sandy loam of the Inner Coastal Plain, do not have much clay.

== Viticulture ==
After Prohibition, Haw River Valley cash crops were tobacco and soybeans throughout the 20th Century. However, as the tobacco industry waned, viticulture made a resurgence in Haw River Valley the last two decades. Pioneering vintners and farmers hired Napa Valley consultants to explore North Carolina properties as prospective vineyards transforming retired tobacco farms with vine trellises. By the 2000s, Haw River Valley's 60 acres (24 ha) of vineyards were sourcing North Carolina wineries that produced quality vintages.
