= Tennessee wine =

Grape wine made in Tennessee

Tennessee
- Wine region
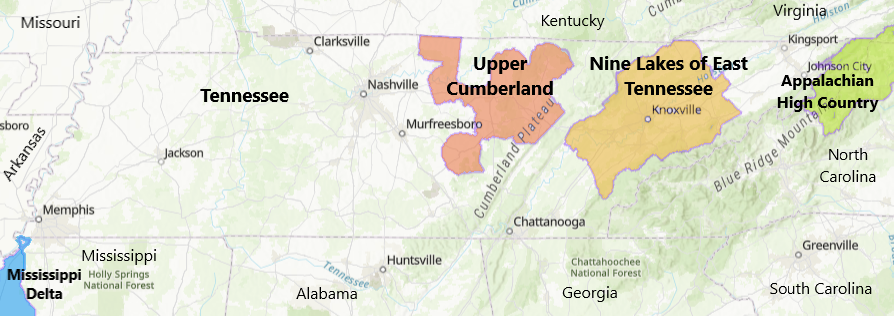
- Tennessee Viticultural Areas
- Official name: State of Tennessee
- Type: U.S. State Appellation
- Years of wine industry: 146
- Country: United States
- Other regions in vicinity: North Carolina, Virginia
- Sub-regions: Mississippi Delta AVA, Appalachian High Country AVA, Nine Lakes of East Tennessee AVA, Upper Cumberland AVA
- Climate region: Humid Subtropical and Oceanic
- Total area: 26 million acres (41,235 sq mi)
- Grapes produced: Baco noir, Cabernet Franc, Cabernet Sauvignon, Carlos, Catawba, Cayuga, Chambourcin, Chancellor, Chardonnay, Chardonel, Chenin blanc, Concord, Frontenac, Cynthiana, Doreen, Leon Millot, Marechal Foch, Marquette, Merlot, Muscadine, Niagara, Noble, Noiret, Norton, Riesling, Sauvignon blanc, Seyval blanc, Steuben, Traminette, Vidal Blanc, Viognier
- No. of wineries: 55

Tennessee wine refers to wine made from grapes grown in the U.S. state appellation of Tennessee. State names in the United States automatically qualify as legal appellations of origin for wine produced from grapes grown in that state and do not require registration with the Alcohol and Tobacco Tax and Trade Bureau (TTB) of the Treasury Department. TTB was created in January 2003, when the Bureau of Alcohol, Tobacco and Firearms, or ATF, was extensively reorganized under the provisions of the Homeland Security Act of 2002.

The state was home to a wine industry in the 19th century that was decimated when Prohibition was enacted with ratification of the 18th Amendment in 1919. The modern Tennessean wine industry focuses on French hybrid and native grapes, which are more resistant to the fungal grapevine diseases that thrive in its humid climate. Most of the wineries in the state are located in Middle and East Tennessee. A small portion of the Mississippi Delta, the state's initial American Viticultural Area (AVA) established in 1984, extends from Louisiana and Mississippi, into the southwestern section of the state. The Appalachian High Country AVA, recognized in 2016, traverses across the northeastern border with North Carolina and Virginia. The Upper Cumberland appellation was established in Middle Tennessee on June 14, 2024. In the eastern region of the state surrounding Knoxville, the 2.6-million-acre (4,064 sq mi) Nine Lakes of East Tennessee AVA was established on March 24, 2026.

== History ==
Tennessee has a long history of habitation. The unique geography of Tennessee dictated the pattern of settlement. The region's first inhabitants were nomadic Paleo-Indians hunters between 12,000 to 15,000 years ago. Their descendants settled on the many river terraces located throughout the state then expanded outward establishing permanent settlements which reached a peak of prehistoric cultural development between 700 and 1300 AD. The first migrant explorers arrived in 1540 initiating a period of European exploration and exploitation. For over two hundred years the indigenous populations co-existed with the small numbers of settlers, frontiersmen, and explorers in the Upper Cumberland area. The use of the name "Cumberland" came from an English explorer Thomas Watson who named the Cumberland River after the Duke of Cumberland in 1750, and it soon became a oft-used name for geographic entities, including the Cumberland Plateau and the region known as Upper Cumberland. The dramatic change occurred after 1775 when Daniel Boone established a route, the Wilderness Road, between the eastern and western United States via the Cumberland Gap, a passageway through the Cumberland Mountains between Kentucky and Tennessee. The Wilderness Road forked soon after the Gap, with the southern route leading directly into the Upper Cumberland. These first settlers in the Upper Cumberland region came from Virginia and North Carolina and were primarily of English and Scotch-Irish ancestry.

Agriculture was the driving force in the settlement and development of Tennessee and the Upper Cumberland. The vast majority of immigrants to the state of Tennessee during the late eighteenth century and early nineteenth century were in search of a better life and the route to this life was exploitation of the rich farming potential of the region. Tennessee's eastern valleys of the Tennessee and Holston River systems were some of the first areas settled. Tennessee is perhaps better known for "moonshine," or whiskey. in 1886, the Nashville Daily Union reported that the distilling industry was the largest manufacturing industry in the state of Tennessee, annually consuming 750,000 bushels of corn and 500,000 bushels of apples and peaches. Both East and Middle Tennessee were well suited for the production of whiskey, having good soil for growing corn, an abundance of firewood, white oak for the manufacture of barrels, and a good network of rivers upon which to ship the whiskey to marketing centers like Knoxville, Chattanooga, Nashville, Memphis, and beyond. European settlers were quick to introduce grape growing and wine-making to Tennessee. In 1880, the Tennessee Department of Agriculture estimated there were 1,128 acres (456 ha) of grapes growing in the state. Mark Twain, in his autobiography, reminisces about his father's estate in Upper Cumberland region round about Jamestown, which "produced a wild grape of a promising sort." Those grapes were sent to a renowned vintner in Ohio who opined "that[they] would make as good wine as his Catawbas." However, as in all states, Prohibition slowed or halted grape production in Tennessee.
The TVA dams of the Tennessee and Cumberland River systems and the lakes so formed, in addition to vastly reducing flood damage have facilitated water transportation, provided abundant low cost hydroelectric power and created extensive recreation areas. Fishing, boating, swimming and camping along the many lakes, together with the several state and national parks, have made tourism a major industry in the region. It has also fostered a burgeoning vineyard and winery industry where viticulture rebounded in the later decades of the 20th century.
In 1980, the first post-Prohibition wineries were licensed and the first modern winery in Tennessee, Highland Manor Winery, is located in Upper Cumberland AVA. By 2015, Tennessee was estimated to have over 1,000 acres (405 ha) of grapes and around 70 wineries. The epicenter of the Tennessee wine industry is in the Nine Lakes AVA with 232 acres (94 ha) vineyards and 29 wineries located in every but two of its fourteen counties. Although modern wine-making is recent, Nine Lakes region is an area successfully growing a wide variety of grapes and producing wines characteristic of the region. Muscadine, hybrid, vinifera and native grapes are all grown and its wines have garnered awards effectively utilizing available information regarding climate, soils, and topography to determine the best sites and varieties for their vineyards. New growers are looking to the region as an area where successful cultivation of a broad variety of wine grapes can successfully be grown.

== Wine Regions ==
=== Mississippi Delta ===
The 3.8-million-acre (6,000 sq mi) Mississippi Delta AVA was established in 1984 by the ATF, in northwestern Mississippi with minute segments extending into Louisiana and Tennessee. It lies on the left (east) bank of the Mississippi River, between Vicksburg, Mississippi and Memphis, Tennessee. It includes portions of the Mississippi Delta and the watershed of the lower Mississippi River in Louisiana (west bank), Mississippi, and Tennessee. The few wineries in Mississippi Delta produce wine from the native Muscadine grapes.

=== Appalachian High Country ===
Appalachian High Country AVA is located mainly in North Carolina with sections in Tennessee and Virginia. The approximately 1.5-million-acre (2,400 sq mi) appellation encompasses all or portions of the following counties: Alleghany, Ashe, Avery, Mitchell, and Watauga Counties in North Carolina; Carter County and Johnson Counties in Tennessee; and Grayson County in Virginia. It was established as North Carolina's fifth, Tennessee's second and Virginia's eighth appellation in 2016 by the TTB. Because of the cool climate and short growing season, the region is suitable for growing cold-hardy grape varietals such as Marquette, Vidal Blanc, and Frontenac, which do not have a lengthy maturation time.

=== Upper Cumberland ===
The Upper Cumberland AVA is located in Middle Tennessee and expands all or portions of the following eight counties: Cumberland, Fentress, Macon, Putnam, Overton, Smith, Warren, and White. It was established as the state's third appellation in 2024 by the TTB after reviewing the petition submitted by the Appalachian Region Wine Producers Association. The viticultural area encircles the cities of Cookeville and McMinnville, lies east of Nashville and Murfreesboro, and encompasses approximately 2.18 million acres (3,406 sq mi) with 55 vineyards cultivating over 71 acres (29 ha) and sourcing nine wineries. There is at least one vineyard in each county demonstrating the commercial viticulture and wine-making viability throughout the entire region.

=== Nine Lakes of East Tennessee ===
Nine Lakes of East Tennessee AVA is located in East Tennessee and expands across all or portions of the following fourteen counties encircling the city of Knoxville. It was established as the state's fourth appellation in 2026 on behalf of the Appalachian Region Wine Producers Association. The approximately 2.6-million-acre (4,064 sq mi) AVA lies between the Appalachian High Country and Upper Cumberland wine regions with 29 wineries sourcing from 32 vineyards spread across all but two counties cultivating over 232 acres (94 ha) under vine. The Nine Lakes wine region sits in the Valley and Ridge Province of eastern Tennessee surrounding nine lakes formed by the Tennessee Valley Authority (TVA) dams along the Tennessee River. Although modern wine-making was established in 1984, Nine Lakes region is an area successfully growing a wide variety of grapes and producing wines characteristic of the region Muscadine, hybrid, vinifera and native grapes are all grown and its wines have garnered awards effectively utilizing available information regarding climate, soils, and topography to determine the best sites and varieties for their vineyards. New growers are looking to the region as an area where successful cultivation of a broad variety of wine grapes can successfully be grown.
