= Vermont wine =

Appelation that designates wine in the state of Vermont

Vermont
- Wine region
- Official name: State of Vermont
- Type: U.S. State Appellation
- Years of wine industry: 56
- Country: United States
- Other regions in vicinity: New York
- Total area: 6 million acres (9,217 sq mi)
- Size of planted vineyards: 175 acres (71 ha)
- No. of vineyards: 3
- Grapes produced: Baco noir, Cayuga, Chardonnay, Frontenac, Leon Millot, Marechal Foch, Riesling, Seyval blanc, St. Croix, Traminette, Vidal blanc, Vignoles, Zweigelt
- No. of wineries: 7

Vermont wine refers to wine made from grapes grown in the U.S. state of Vermont. The first commercial winery in Vermont, Snow Farm Winery, opened in 1997. Vermont is a very cold climate for viticulture. Vermont wineries have focused on using cold-hardy French hybrid grapes, but have been experimenting with some Vitis vinifera varieties. Some Vermont wineries produce wine made from grapes grown in other states, especially New York.

Vermont is a center for natural wine and biodynamic wine production.

The Champlain Valley is poised to become a federally recognized wine region, to the excitement of a number of Vermont vineyard owners.

In 2022, Kenneth Albert, the founder of Shelburne Vineyard and president of the Vermont Grape and Wine Council, submitted a petition to the Alcohol and Tobacco Tax and Trade Bureau (TTB), Treasury to recognize the state's initial American Viticultural Area (AVA) named "Champlain Valley of Vermont" that includes a broad swath of land between Lake Champlain's edge and the Green Mountains, and stretches from Rutland County to the Canadian border. Mr. Albert said, the establishment of the AVA would "...gives us validity" and vintners say this federal recognition would provide a real opportunity to grow Vermont's profile in this industry.

== See also ==
- American wine
- List of wineries in New England
