= Crest of the Blue Ridge Henderson County AVA =

American Viticultural Area in North Carolina

Coordinates: 35°20′55″N 82°23′52″W

Crest of the Blue Ridge Henderson County
- Wine region
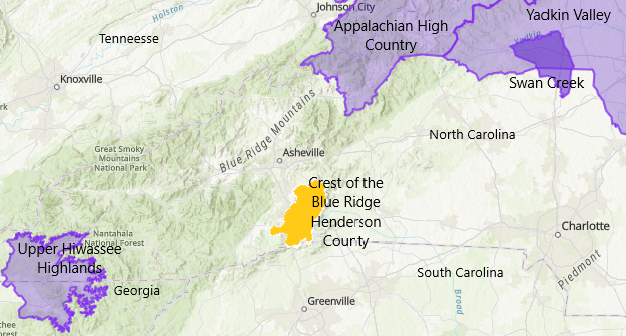
- Type: American Viticultural Area
- Year established: 2019
- Years of wine industry: 18
- Country: United States
- Part of: North Carolina
- Other regions in North Carolina: Appalachian High Country AVA, Haw River Valley AVA, Swan Creek AVA, Upper Hiwassee Highlands AVA, Yadkin Valley AVA
- Growing season: 209 days
- Climate region: Region III
- Heat units: 63 to 67 °F (17–19 °C)
- Precipitation (annual average): 57.5 inches (1,460.5 mm)
- Soil conditions: Rocky and mineral-rich
- Total area: 215 square miles (137,600 acres)
- Size of planted vineyards: 70 acres (28 ha)
- No. of vineyards: 14
- Grapes produced: Cabernet Franc, Cabernet Sauvignon, Chardonel, Chardonnay, Grüner Veltliner, Merlot, Muscadine, Norton, Petit Verdot, Riesling, Traminette, Vidal Blanc, Zinfandel
- No. of wineries: 2

Crest of the Blue Ridge Henderson County is an American Viticultural Area (AVA) located in Henderson County, North Carolina encompassing 215 square miles (137,600 acres). It was established as the nation's 245^{th} and the state's sixth appellation on July 19, 2019 by the Alcohol and Tobacco Tax and Trade Bureau (TTB), Treasury after reviewing the petition submitted by Mark Williams, the executive director of Agribusiness Henderson County, and Barbara Walker, the county extension support specialist for North Carolina Cooperative Extension, on behalf of local vineyards and winery operators, proposing the viticultural area named "Crest of the Blue Ridge Henderson County."

The AVA has 14 commercial vineyards cultivating approximately 70 acres (28 ha) and two wineries. Several existing vineyards are planning to expand by a total of 55 acres (22 ha) in the next 5 years. According to the petition, the distinguishing features of the Crest of the Blue Ridge Henderson County AVA are its climate and topography—specifically its elevation.

== History ==
The term "Crest of the Blue Ridge" was first used by Colonel Joseph Pratt, who was the chief of the North Carolina Geological and Economic Survey from 1906 to 1923. In 1910, Pratt proposed creating a scenic road and chain of tourist hotels atop or adjacent to the summit of the Blue Ridge Mountains. Pratt named the project the "Crest of the Blue Ridge Highway." Several small sections of the road were built, but the start of World War I interrupted the work, and completion was put on hold. In the end, the project was never completed, but the term "Crest of the Blue Ridge" survived and remains in widespread, present-day use to describe areas of the Southern Appalachians, especially in North Carolina.

== Name Evidence ==
The Crest of the Blue Ridge Henderson County AVA straddles the ridge line that forms the crest of the Blue Ridge Mountains. The ridge line forming the crest of the Blue Ridge is marked and labeled on eight of the nine U.S.G.S. topographic maps used to form the boundary of the AVA. Because the entire crest covers a multi-state region that is significantly larger than the AVA, the petitioners added "Henderson County" in order to identify the location of the AVA more specifically. TTB did not require the addition of "North Carolina" to the proposed name because TTB is not aware of the crest of the Blue Ridge Mountains running through any other county named Henderson County. The petition included examples of current use of the term "Crest of the Blue Ridge" to describe the region. Henderson County is also often promoted as the Crest of the Blue Ridge Agricultural Area for its variety of commercial agricultural products. For example, the Henderson County Tourism Development Authority's "Cheers Trail" publication, which advertises commercial breweries, cideries, and wineries in the county, notes that all the producers on the trail are "located in Henderson County in the Crest of the Blue Ridge Agricultural Area." The county also promotes its apple orchards with its Crest of the Blue Ridge Orchard Trail guide. Agribusiness Henderson County, a local non-profit agriculture and agri-tourism advocate, promotes the county's farm businesses through its Southern Mountain Fresh brand, which states, "Enjoy the freshness of the Crest of the Blue Ridge Mountains and sustain our local heritage." Finally, two wineries with vineyards within the AVA use the term "Crest of the Blue Ridge" to describe their locations. Burntshirt Vineyards' website states that its vineyards occupy "...a unique position with two vineyards on both sides of the Eastern Continental Divide on the Crest of the Blue Ridge." St. Paul Mountain Vineyards' website describes its vineyards as being "on the crest of the Blue Ridge in Edneyville."

== Terroir ==
Crest of the Blue Ridge Henderson County AVA straddles the ridge line that forms the crest of the Blue Ridge Mountains. To the east and south of the AVA are the low, rolling hills of the Inner Piedmont region. To the west of the AVA are the rugged mountains of the Pisgah National Forest. To the north are the Asheville Basin, which is marked by the wide valley of the French Broad River, and the rugged highlands that surround the basin. The distinguishing features of the AVA are its elevation and climate.

=== Topography ===
The petition describes the Crest of the Blue Ridge Henderson County AVA as straddling two physiographic provinces—the Blue Ridge Escarpment and the Blue Ridge Plateau, which are separated by the Eastern Continental Divide, also known as the Crest of the Blue Ridge. To the north of the AVA are two distinct geomorphic regions: The Asheville Basin and a region of higher mountains known informally as the "northern highlands," which includes the Black Mountain range and Mount Mitchell, the highest point east of the Mississippi River. The petition included information about the minimum, maximum, and mean elevations of the Crest of the Blue Ridge Henderson County AVA and each of the surrounding regions. Elevation plays a major role in determining the temperatures, length of growing season, and precipitation within the AVA. In general, areas at high elevations have cooler temperatures and shorter growing seasons than regions at low elevations. Regions at intermediate elevations, such as Crest of the Blue Ridge, generally have warmer temperatures and longer growing seasons than neighboring regions in higher elevations, and they have cooler temperatures and shorter growing seasons than adjacent lower elevations.

=== Climate ===
The petition for the Crest of the Blue Ridge Henderson County AVA included information on several different climate aspects of the AVA and surrounding regions, including average growing season temperatures, average length of growing season, growing degree day zones, and precipitation amounts for the AVA and the surrounding regions.

The climate data is based on data generated by the Precipitation-elevation Regressions on Independent Slopes Model (PRISM) Climate Group at Oregon State University. The petition included information on the average growing season temperatures of the AVA and the surrounding regions. The petition states that a professor at Southern Oregon University used the average growing season temperatures of major wine producing areas of the world to create four major "Climate/Maturity Groupings." The information was intended to help vineyard owners determine what varietals would ripen the best in their region. Using this system, the petitioners calculated the average growing season temperatures of the AVA and the surrounding regions, as well as the percentage of land within each region that fell into each of the climate/maturity groupings. The majority of the Crest of the Blue Ridge Henderson County AVA has average annual growing season temperatures that are in the "Warm" grouping. No portion of the AVA falls into the "Cool" or "Intermediate" groupings. The Ashville Basin region north of the AVA has a larger percentage of land within the "Warm" grouping and also has some land that can be classified in the slightly cooler "Intermediate" grouping. The highlands region north of the AVA and the region to the west are both primarily within the "Intermediate" grouping, while the regions to the south and east are mainly within the "Hot" grouping. According to the petition, regions in the "Warm" grouping are well-suited for growing grape varietals such as Merlot, Cabernet Franc, and Cabernet Sauvignon, which are among the most commonly grown grape varietals within Crest of the Blue Ridge Henderson County.

The petition also included data on the length of the growing season within the Crest of the Blue Ridge Henderson County AVA and the surrounding regions. The petition stated that according to a vineyard site study conducted by the Institute for the Application of Geospatial Technologies and Cornell University's College of Agriculture and Life Sciences, regions with growing seasons shorter than 160 days are generally unsuitable for vineyards because the grapes will not have sufficient time to ripen. Locations with growing seasons of 170 to 180 days are considered "satisfactory," while sites with growing seasons of 180 to 190 days are considered "good." Vineyard locations with growing seasons of over 190 days are considered "not limited by growing season" and are generally the most desirable sites.

Most of the Crest of the Blue Ridge Henderson County AVA is classified as Region III with GDD accumulation between 3,001 and 3,500 per the Winkler index. The data supports the petition's assertion that the AVA has a long, warm growing season that is cooler than the regions to the south and east of the Asheville Basin and warmer than the region to the west and the northern highlands region. The petition states that the two primary GDD zones found within the AVA are suitable for growing both cooler-climate grapes such as Cabernet Sauvignon and Cabernet Franc as well as warmer-climate grapes such as Sauvignon Blanc and Syrah.

Finally, the petition included information on the mean annual, growing season, and winter precipitation amounts for the AVA and the surrounding regions for the period from 1980 to 2010. According to the petition, within the region, air moving inland from the southeastern Atlantic Ocean and the Gulf of Mexico drops its moisture along the mountainous elevations of the Blue Ridge Escarpment and the Eastern Continental Divide. As a result, precipitation amounts decrease as one moves from southeast to northwest through the region. Sufficient annual precipitation amounts are important to prevent vines from experiencing excessive heat and water stress. The data demonstrates that the Crest of the Blue Ridge Henderson County AVA generally has higher mean annual precipitation amounts than the regions to the north and lower mean annual precipitation amounts than the regions to the east and south, which are within the Blue Ridge Escarpment. Although the data also suggests that the region to the west of the AVA also has higher annual precipitation amounts. The petition shows that the higher rainfall amounts are actually in the region to the southwest of the AVA, where moist air from the Gulf of Mexico encounters high elevations, rather than in the region due west which is in the rain shadow of the Eastern Continental Divide.

The petition states the importance to consider the timing of the rainfall. During the growing season, excessive rainfall can cause excess vine and leaf growth, promote fungal disease, and attract insects, while too little rainfall can stress the vines and lead to reduced photosynthesis, cell desiccation, and potential death of the vines. The petition cites a study that found that the recommended growing season precipitation amount for vineyards in North Carolina is between 24 and 30 inches (610–762 mm). The data demonstrates that the mean minimum growing season precipitation amount within the AVA meets the minimum recommended amount. The mean growing season amount slightly exceeds the recommended precipitation amount.

In summary, the evidence provided in the petition indicates that the elevation and climate of Crest of the Blue Ridge Henderson County AVA distinguish it from the surrounding regions in each direction. The AVA has elevations that are generally higher than those of the regions to the south and east and in the Asheville Basin to the north, and lower than those of the northern highlands region and the region to the west. The AVA also has a moderate climate that slightly differs from the climate in the Asheville Basin to the north, is cooler than the regions to the south and east and warmer than the region to the west and the northern highlands. Finally, annual precipitation amounts in the AVA are generally lower than amounts in the regions to the south, west, and east and higher amounts than the highlands and Asheville Basin regions to the north. The USDA plant hardiness zones range from 7a to 8a.

== Viticulture ==
The Blue Ridge Henderson County region has a long history of cider and apple production with an emerging viticulture industry. The region cultivates approximately 78% vinifera grapes along with some hybrid grapes and native North American varieties. The leading vinifera varieties include Cabernet Sauvignon, Cabernet Franc, Chardonnay, Merlot, Riesling, and Grüner Veltliner. Vidal Blanc and Traminette are the main hybrids; Norton is the leading American variety. Vintages produced by local vineyards have earned high honors at the NC Fine Wines Competition which is renowned for being the most stringent of all statewide competitions in the nation.

== See also ==
- North Carolina Wine
