= North Carolina wine =

North Carolina
- Wine region
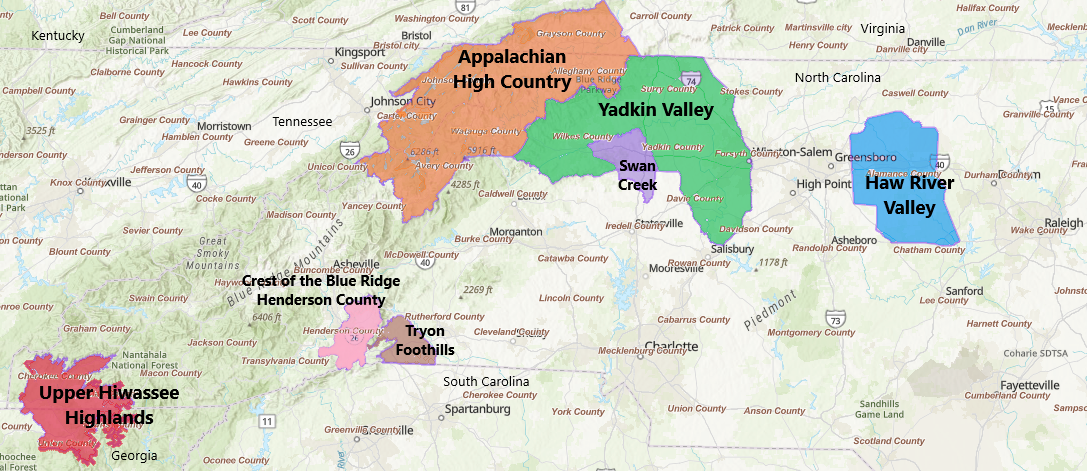
- Official name: State of North Carolina
- Type: U.S. State Appellation
- Years of wine industry: 502
- Country: United States
- Sub-regions: Appalachian High Country AVA, Crest of the Blue Ridge Henderson County AVA, Haw River Valley AVA, Swan Creek AVA, Tryon Foothills AVA, Upper Hiwassee Highlands AVA, Yadkin Valley AVA
- Climate region: Humid subtropical (maritime in highlands)
- Total area: 31 million acres (48,618 sq mi)
- No. of vineyards: 500+
- Grapes produced: Cabernet Franc, Cabernet Sauvignon, Carlos, Cayuga, Chambourcin, Chancellor, Chardonel, Chardonnay, Concord, De Chaunac, Gewürztraminer, Leon Millot, Malbec, Merlot, Mourvèdre, Muscadine, Muscat Canelli, Nebbiolo, Niagara, Noble, Norton, Petit Verdot, Pinot gris, Pinot Noir, Riesling, Sangiovese, Sauvignon blanc, Scuppernong, Seyval blanc, St. Vincent, Symphony, Syrah, Tempranillo, Traminette, Vidal blanc, Vignoles, Viognier
- No. of wineries: 250

North Carolina wine refers to wine made from grapes grown in the U.S. state appellation of North Carolina. Wine has been produced in the region since the early days of European colonization in the 17th century. Wine growers in North Carolina were the first to cultivate a Native American grape variety, the Scuppernong, which produces a sweet wine. Most wine produced in North Carolina since the year 1972 is made from Vitis vinifera grape varieties, although French hybrid and Vitis labrusca varieties remain common.

== Viticulture history ==
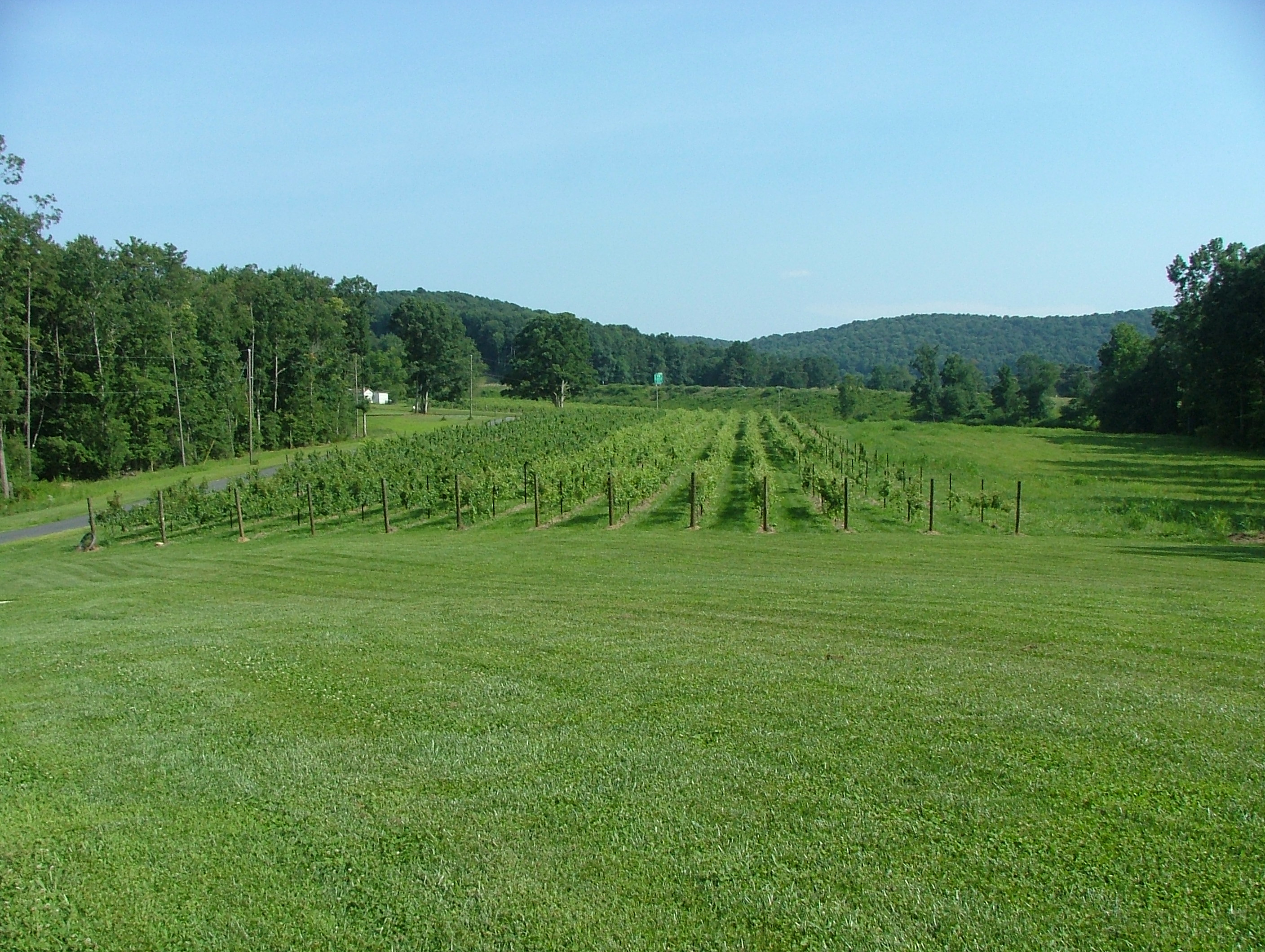
Yadkin Valley vineyard

The first cultivated wine grape in the United States was grown in North Carolina. The first known recorded account of the Scuppernong grape in North Carolina is found in the logbook of explorer Giovanni da Verrazzano. He wrote in 1524, "Many vines growing naturally there [in North Carolina] that without a doubt would yield excellent wines." The grape was the primary source for North Carolina's 19th Century wine, as it had been for about two centuries. In the mid-19th Century, there were some 25 wineries in North Carolina, with extensive independent vineyards, to such an extent that North Carolina dominated the national market for American wines at the time. The Civil War ended that market dominance, but wine production began to recover in the decades after the war through the early 20th Century. However, North Carolina voted to become a dry state in 1908 and that decision, coupled with the onset of Prohibition, ended wine-making in North Carolina. Repeal in 1933, followed by the passage by North Carolina's legislature in 1935 of laws permitting wine-making, began a rebirth, but it was several decades after World War II before North Carolina's wine industry would show significant growth.

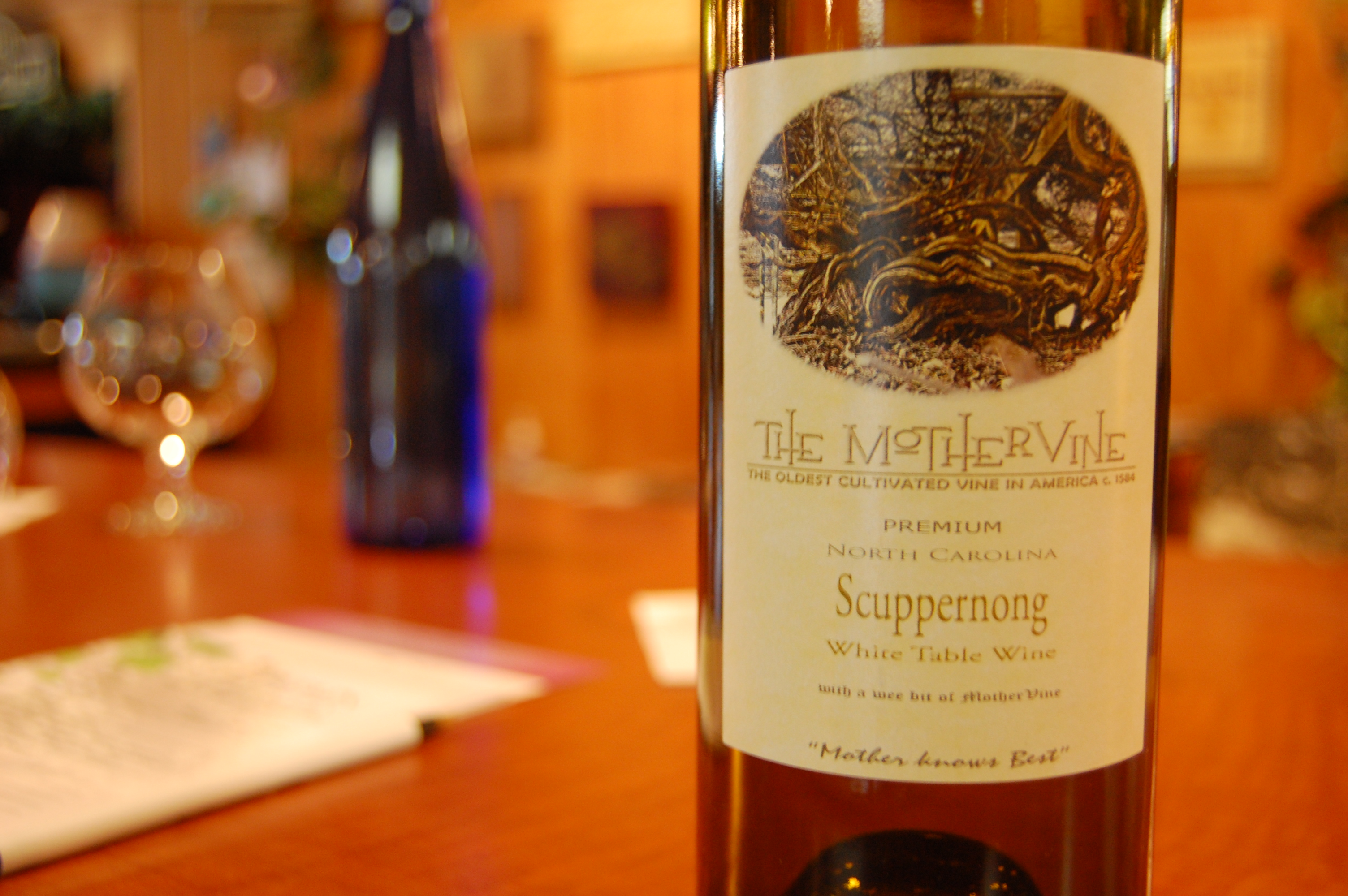
Scuppernong Table Wine

== Modern wine industry ==
North Carolina ranks tenth in both grape and wine production in the United States. One of the first modern major plantings of vinifera grapes in North Carolina occurred in 1972, when Jack Kroustalis established Westbend Vineyards, located in the Yadkin Valley. According to "Carolina Wine Country," "[t]he vines flourished in the rich soil of the Yadkin River Valley." In 1988, Kroustalis built the first bonded winery in the Yadkin Valley. Other growers in Yadkin Valley took note of Westbend Vineyard’s success with vinifera grapes and followed suit. Yadkin Valley was recognized in 2003 as the state's first American Viticultural Area (AVA). Since then, its viticulture industry continues to expand and presently is one of the nation's top five state destinations for enotourism garnering vintage awards and recognition competing with California, Oregon, Washington and Virginia. As of 2025, North Carolina is resident to seven unique AVAs, 255 wineries and 500+ vineyard sites, a fact that underscores the state’s growing reputation as a major viticulture region.

== See also ==
- Muscadine
