= Noiret =

Variety of grape

Noiret is a hybrid grape variety used in red wine production. It was developed and named by Cornell University researchers working at the New York State Agricultural Experiment Station, and was officially released on July 7, 2006.

== Description ==
Noiret is the result of a cross between the earlier hybrids NY65.0467.08 and Steuben in 1973; the predominant ancestors for these hybrids are Vitis labrusca varieties native to the northeastern region of North America and Vitis vinifera varieties, which are the classic European wine grapes. Noiret ripens mid-season, and, according to Professor Bruce Reisch of Cornell, its wines "are free of the hybrid aromas typical of many other red hybrid grapes. The distinctive red wine is richly colored and has notes of green and black pepper, with raspberry and mint aromas, and a fine tannin structure."
