= Upper Hiwassee Highlands AVA =

American Viticultural Area in North Carolina and Georgia

Coordinates: 35°01′23″N 84°01′46″W

Upper Hiwassee Highlands
- Wine region
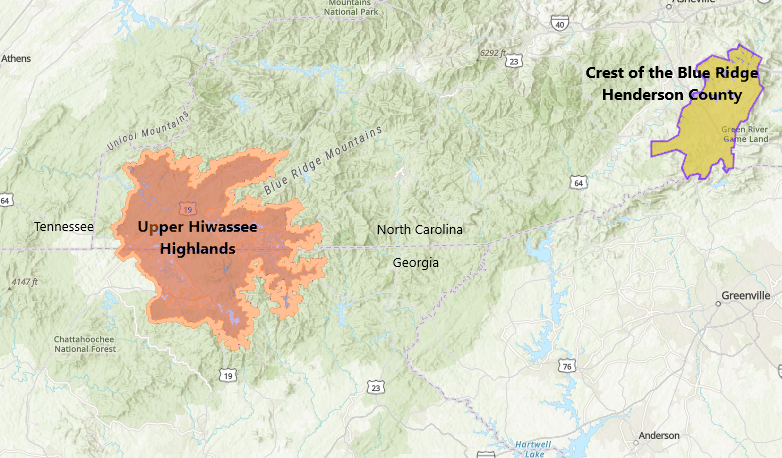
- Type: American Viticultural Area
- Year established: 2014
- Years of wine industry: 29
- Country: United States
- Part of: Georgia, North Carolina
- Growing season: 161–177 days
- Climate region: Region I-IV
- Heat units: 1503–3100 GDD
- Precipitation (annual average): 61.4 in (1,559.6 mm)
- Soil conditions: Derived from metasedimentary rocks, i.e., phyllites, slates, schists, metasandstones, and marble
- Total area: 441,600 acres (690 sq mi)
- Size of planted vineyards: 54 acres (22 ha)
- No. of vineyards: 26
- Grapes produced: Albariño, Cabernet Franc, Cabernet Sauvignon, Catawba, Chambourcin, Chardonnay, Concord, Grüner Veltliner, Merlot, Muscadine, Niagara, Norton, Norton(Cythiana), Sangiovese, Seyval Blanc, Vidal Blanc, and Traminette
- No. of wineries: 9

Upper Hiwassee Highlands is an American Viticultural Area (AVA) that straddles two counties in the southwestern corner of North Carolina adjacent to the Tennessee border across state lines into three counties of northern Georgia. It is located near the southern end of the Blue Ridge Mountains and expands over portions of Cherokee and Clay Counties, North Carolina into Fannin, Towns and Union Counties, Georgia. The appellation was established as the nation's 214^{th}, Georgia's initial and North Carolina's fourth AVA on July 18, 2014 by the Alcohol and Tobacco Tax and Trade Bureau (TTB), Treasury after reviewing the petition submitted by Eric Carlson, owner of Calaboose Cellars, on behalf of himself and members of the Vineyard and Winery Operators of the Upper Hiwassee River Basin group, proposing the viticultural area to be named "Upper Hiwassee Highlands."

The viticultural area encompassed approximately 441,600 acres (690 sq mi) with 54 acres (22 ha) being cultivated on 26 commercial vineyards. According to the petition, the vineyard owners estimated to expand plantings of 75.5 acres (30.6 ha) in the next five years. Two new vineyards were also in the planning stages and expected to add an additional of 16 acres (6 ha) to the total acreage by the end of 2013. Five wineries were operating within the proposed AVA at the time the petition was submitted.

== Name Evidence ==
Upper Hiwassee Highlands viticultural area is located in the southern Appalachian Mountains in portions of southwestern North Carolina and northwestern Georgia. According to the petition, "highland" and "highlands" are traditional terms used to describe the high, rugged, regions of the southern portion of the Appalachians and are terms used by businesses and organizations within the viticultural area. Because the word "highlands" applies to a very broad region of the Appalachian Mountains, the petitioner chose to add the term "Upper Hiwassee" to the name of the viticultural area to distinguish it geographically from the larger Appalachian region. The term "Upper Hiwassee" refers to the viticultural area's location along the upper portions of the Hiwassee River, from the river's headwaters in Towns County, Georgia, to the Hiwassee Dam on Hiwassee Lake in Cherokee County, North Carolina. The portion of the river that flows north of the dam, outside the viticultural area, is often referred to as the "lower" river. The name "Hiwassee" (/hˈɪwəsˌi/ hi-wuhseeis) and its variant "Hiawassee" are used throughout the region of the viticultural area. The town of Hiawassee, Georgia, is located within the viticultural area in Towns County and is near the headwaters of the Hiwassee River. A search by TTB of the USGS's Geographical Names Information System (GNIS) found 13 locations and populated places within the proposed viticultural area that use the name "Hiwassee," including a church and a mountain ridge in Towns County, Georgia, and a school, fire department, dam, and cemetery in Cherokee County, North Carolina.

== Terroir ==
The distinguishing features of the Upper Hiwassee Highlands viticultural area include topography, temperature, and soils. Most of the vineyards within the viticultural area are planted in the valleys or on the gentle slopes of the lower elevations of the mountains. Upper Hiwassee Highlands viticultural area is bordered to the north, east, and south by higher, steeper mountains interspersed with narrow, deeply incised gorges. To the west, below the Hiwassee Dam, are a series of lower ridges, mountains, and deep, narrow river gorges that form the watershed for the Ocoee River and the lower portion of the Hiwassee River.

=== Topography ===
Upper Hiwassee Highlands region's average elevation is 2,000 ft (610 m) sitting on the southern end of the Appalachian Mountain in parts of northern Georgia and southern North Carolina that stretches almost to the Tennessee border in the west. Upper Hiwassee Highlands viticultural area is a broad basin that encompasses the watershed for the upper portion of the Hiwassee River. The Hiwassee River has its headwaters in the southeast portion of the viticultural area, near the town of Hiawassee, Georgia. In addition to having lower elevations than most of the surrounding regions, the Upper Hiwassee Highlands viticultural area also has significantly shallower slope angles. According to the slope angle analysis included in the petition, approximately 70 percent of the slopes within the viticultural area have angles between 0 and 15 degrees, which is level enough to prevent erosion and gentle enough for safe and convenient manual and mechanical cultivation. Only 16 percent of the slopes within the viticultural area have slope angles greater than 20 percent. Slope angles greater than 20 degrees are unsafe for mechanical cultivation and make even manual vineyard work difficult. To the north of the viticultural area, within the Unicoi and Snowbird Mountains, only 20 percent of the slopes are less than or equal to 15 degrees, and 62 percent are at angles greater than 20 degrees. To the east, within the Valley River and the Tusquitee and Nantahala Mountains, only 23 percent of the slopes have angles less than or equal to 15 degrees, and 58 percent of the slopes have angles greater than 20 degrees. To the south, within the Blue Ridge Mountains, 30 percent of the slopes have angles less than or equal to 15 degrees, and 47 percent of the slopes are over 20 degrees. To the west, in the watersheds of the Ocoee River and lower Hiwassee River, 63 percent of the slope angles are less than or equal to 15 degrees, and 21 percent of the slopes have angles greater than 20 degrees. The gentle mountain slopes and broad valleys of the Upper Hiwassee Highlands viticultural area allow high amounts of solar radiation to reach the vineyards. By contrast, the surrounding regions are characterized by steep mountains and narrow, deeply incised gorges which restrict the amount of sunlight that reaches the lower, tillable mountainsides and valley floors; this effect is known as "mountain shadowing." Both the total and the per-acre solar radiation accumulation within the viticultural area are greater than those of all of the surrounding regions. The contrast is greatest between the region to the north and the viticultural area, with the viticultural area accumulating 3.32 times the amount of total solar radiation and 23 percent more solar radiation on a per-acre basis. High levels of solar radiation promote efficient photosynthesis in the vines and speed the ripening of fruit.

=== Climate ===
Upper Hiwassee Highlands viticultural area is warmer than the surrounding regions to the north, east, and south and slightly cooler than the region to the west. Because of the wide variety of elevations both within and outside the viticultural area, the petition used the climate data mapping system created by the PRISM Climate Group at Oregon State University to estimate general climate patterns for the entire region. The climate normals used in the calculations were gathered from three weather stations within the viticultural area and nine stations from the surrounding regions. The mean July temperature was also calculated because July represents the peak of the growing season. The petition used the climate data mapping system to determine the Winkler Region Classification for the various elevations within Upper Hiwassee Highlands viticultural area and the surrounding regions. The majority of the viticultural area (84 percent) is classified as a moderately warm Region III climate in the Winkler climate classification system. The regions to the north, east, and south are classified as very cool Regions I and II. The region to the west is primarily a Region III, similar to the viticultural area, although the region to the west does have a larger percentage of land in the very warm Region IV category than the viticultural area. Finally, the petition included estimates of the average freeze-free period, also referred to as the growing season, for Upper Hiwassee Highlands AVA and the surrounding regions. The data was collected from the period between 1971 and 2000 from the same weather stations used to determine the mean annual and growing season temperatures. The three weather stations within the viticultural area have average freeze-free periods that are generally shorter than those to the west, south, and southeast and longer than those to the northeast. Although the viticultural area has freeze-free periods similar to those to the east, the area to the east still has cooler overall temperatures that distinguish the region from the viticultural area. The moderately warm temperature of the Upper Hiwassee Highlands viticultural area plays a role in the varieties of grapes that are grown. According to the petition, the climate is most suitable for growing French-American hybrids, which are grown in 17 of the 26 vineyards within the viticultural area and cover 49 percent of the total vineyard acres. Examples of these French-American hybrids include Chambourcin, Traminette, Seyval Blanc, and Vidal Blanc. American varieties, such as Norton, Catawba, and Concord, are also popular and are grown in 11 of the vineyards and cover approximately 14 percent of the total vineyard acres. Vitis vinifera varieties cover approximately 37 percent of the total vineyard acres, but according to the petition, only 1 of the 26 vineyards within the area grows vitis vinifera varieties exclusively, with a total of half an acre planted to Cabernet Sauvignon. By contrast, the petition notes that the vitis vinifera varieties are the most common varieties grown in the surrounding regions. The Biltmore Vineyard, approximately 90 miles away in Asheville, North Carolina, is the nearest commercial vineyard to the north and grows vitis vinifera exclusively, including Cabernet Sauvignon, Merlot, and Chardonnay. The nearest vineyards to the south, approximately 30 mi (48 km) in Dahlonega and Cleveland, Georgia, and to the west, in the Appalachian foothills of Tennessee, also primarily grow vitis vinifera varieties, along with some American varieties. Commercial viticulture is not present immediately to the east of the viticultural area because the region is largely covered by the Nantahala National Forest. The USDA plant hardiness zones range from 7a to 8a.

=== Soil ===
Nineteen soil associations have been mapped within Upper Hiwassee Highlands viticultural area, and 4 of these associations cover 77 percent of the land: Tsali-Spivey-Santeetlah-Junaluska (37 percent), Saluda-Hayesville-Evard-Brevard-Bradson (20 percent), Evard-Clifton-Braddock (11 percent), and Tusquitee-Porters-Edneyville-Ashe (10 percent). These soils are derived from metasedimentary rocks such as phyllites, slates, schists, metasandstones, and marble. They are generally deep, moderately to well drained, and moderately fertile. Deep soil allows for ample root growth to support the vines and collect water and nutrients. Well drained soil prevents waterlogging, which promotes rot and fungal growth. Moderately fertile soil provides adequate nutrition to the vines without promoting excessively thick leaf canopies that provide too much shade to the grape clusters; overly shaded fruit ripens slower than fruit with more sun exposure and is more susceptible to mold and mildew. To the north, within the Unicoi and Snowbird mountains, soils of the Stecoah-Spivey-Porters-Edneyville-Chestnut association are the most common (40 percent). To the east, within the Valley River and the Nantahala and Tusquitee Mountains, soils of the Tusquitee-Porters-Fannin-Evard-Bervard-Ashe association are the most prevalent (40 percent). The petition states that the soil to the north and east is shallower and more at risk for erosion because of the steepness of the terrain. The petition also states that the soil in these regions is likely to contain more organic material and be more fertile than the soil of the viticultural area due to the large amounts of decaying leaves and other vegetative matter dropped from trees and shrubs in these heavily forested regions. To the south, within the Blue Ridge Mountains, and to the west, within the watersheds of the Ocoee River and lower Hiwassee River, the Tusquitee-Porters-Edneyville-Ashe association is the most common soil type (91 percent and 27 percent, respectively). The petition notes that although this soil association is also found within the viticultural area, the soil to the south and west occurs on much steeper slopes and, therefore, is likely to be shallower and more at risk of erosion than the same soil series within the viticultural area.

== Viticulture ==
Upper Hiwassee Highlands AVA has a rich agricultural and cultural history where the average elevation is 2,000 ft (610 m) sitting toward the southern end of the Appalachian Mountain region in parts of northern Georgia and southern North Carolina stretching west toward the Tennessee border. Most of the AVA's vineyards are located between 2,000 to 2,400 ft (610–732 m) above sea level, an altitude that helps to temper the warm, humid climate associated with the southeastern United States. Vines cover the gentle lower slopes of the mountains and the valley floor, and the minor rises within the area ensures there is plentiful sunlight throughout the growing season. This fosters ripening, while the diurnal temperature variation helps grapes retain acidity by slowing the development of sugars and phenols. Vineyards such as Valley River, owned by Elaine Dockery, sits on the North Carolina side elevated about 1,500 ft (460 m), and the Seifarth family's Crane Creek, located 15 mi (24 km) away in Georgia at almost 2,000 ft (610 m), illustrates the significant differences in temperature, rainfall, humidity and soil composition within Upper Hiwassee Highlands. Since the late-90s both vineyards were planted with vitis vinifera without worrying about Pierce's disease where the valley floor soils are warmer and wetter and have a less clay-like texture than at higher elevations. The Thompson family has farmed their North Carolinian land since 1820 where Nottely River Valley Vineyards was established in 2008. The region's vine selection is a mixture of vinifera, hybrids (both French-American and more modern varieties) and native grapes like Niagara and Muscadines. The majority of Crane Creek's cultivation are hybrids, including Chambourcin, Seyval Blanc, Traminette and some Norton with Cabernet Franc, Grüner Veltliner and Albariño. The historic, annual Sorghum Festival in Blairsville is an ideal draw for the area's growing enotourism.

== Vineyards and Wineries ==
- Crane Creek Vineyards
- Eagle Fork Vineyard
- Ferncrest Winery
- Hightower Creek Vineyards
- Nottely River Valley Vineyards
- Odom Springs Vineyards
- Paradise Hills Winery Resort & Spa
- Redtail Mountain Vineyard
- Shooting Creek Vines
- Valley River Vineyards
