= Vidal blanc =

Variety of grape

- Grape (Vitis)
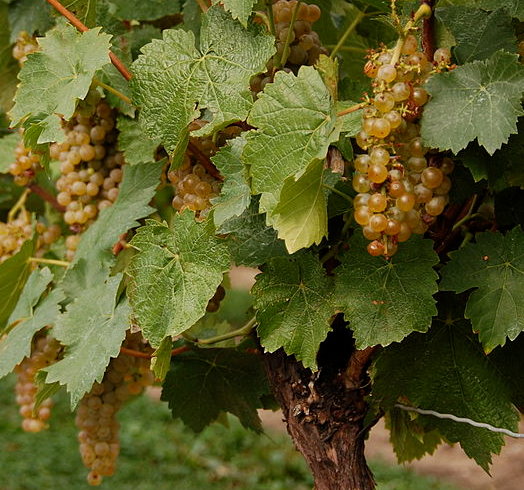
- Vidal blanc grapes growing in Ontario
- Color of berry skin: Blanc
- Species: 50% Vitis vinifera variety Ugni blanc × 50% Rayon d'Or (Seibel 4986)
- Origin: Jean Louis Vidal
- VIVC number: 13047

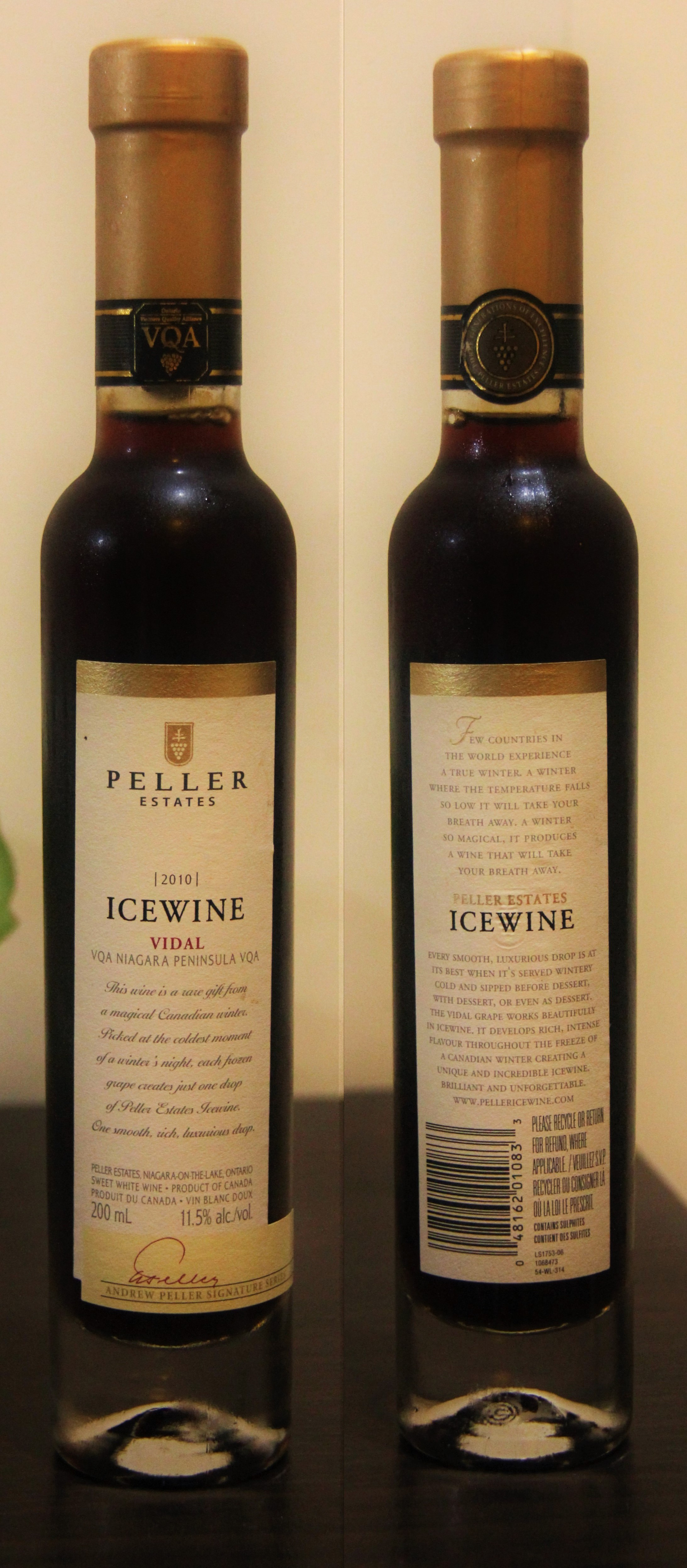
Vidal Ice wine by Peller Estates in Ontario

Vidal blanc (or simply Vidal) is a white hybrid grape variety produced from the Vitis vinifera variety Ugni blanc (also known as Trebbiano Toscano) and another hybrid variety, Rayon d'Or (Seibel 4986). It is a very winter-hardy variety that manages to produce high sugar levels in cold climates with moderate to high acidity.

The grape was developed in the 1930s by French wine grape breeder Jean Louis Vidal; his primary goal in developing the variety was for the production of Cognac in the Charente-Maritime region of western France. However, due to its winter hardiness, this grape variety is cultivated most extensively in the Canadian wine regions of Ontario, British Columbia, Quebec and Nova Scotia where it is often used for ice wine production as a permitted grape of the Vintners Quality Alliance. It is also grown widely throughout the United States where it is used to produce both dry and sweet wines in the Finger Lakes American Viticultural Area (AVA) of New York, Yadkin Valley AVA and Crest of the Blue Ridge Henderson County AVA of North Carolina, Outer Coastal Plain AVA of Southern New Jersey, Michigan, Virginia, Missouri and other states. The grape is also grown just 500 miles south of the Arctic Circle in Sweden where it is also used to make ice wine.

The wine produced from Vidal blanc tends to be very fruity, with aroma notes of grapefruit and pineapple. Due to its high acidity and sugar potential, it is particularly suited to sweeter, dessert wines. In particular, because of the tough outer skin of the fruit, it is well adapted for the production of ice wine. It is somewhat resistant to downy mildew but is very susceptible to other viticultural hazards such as coulure and powdery mildew.

== Parentage ==
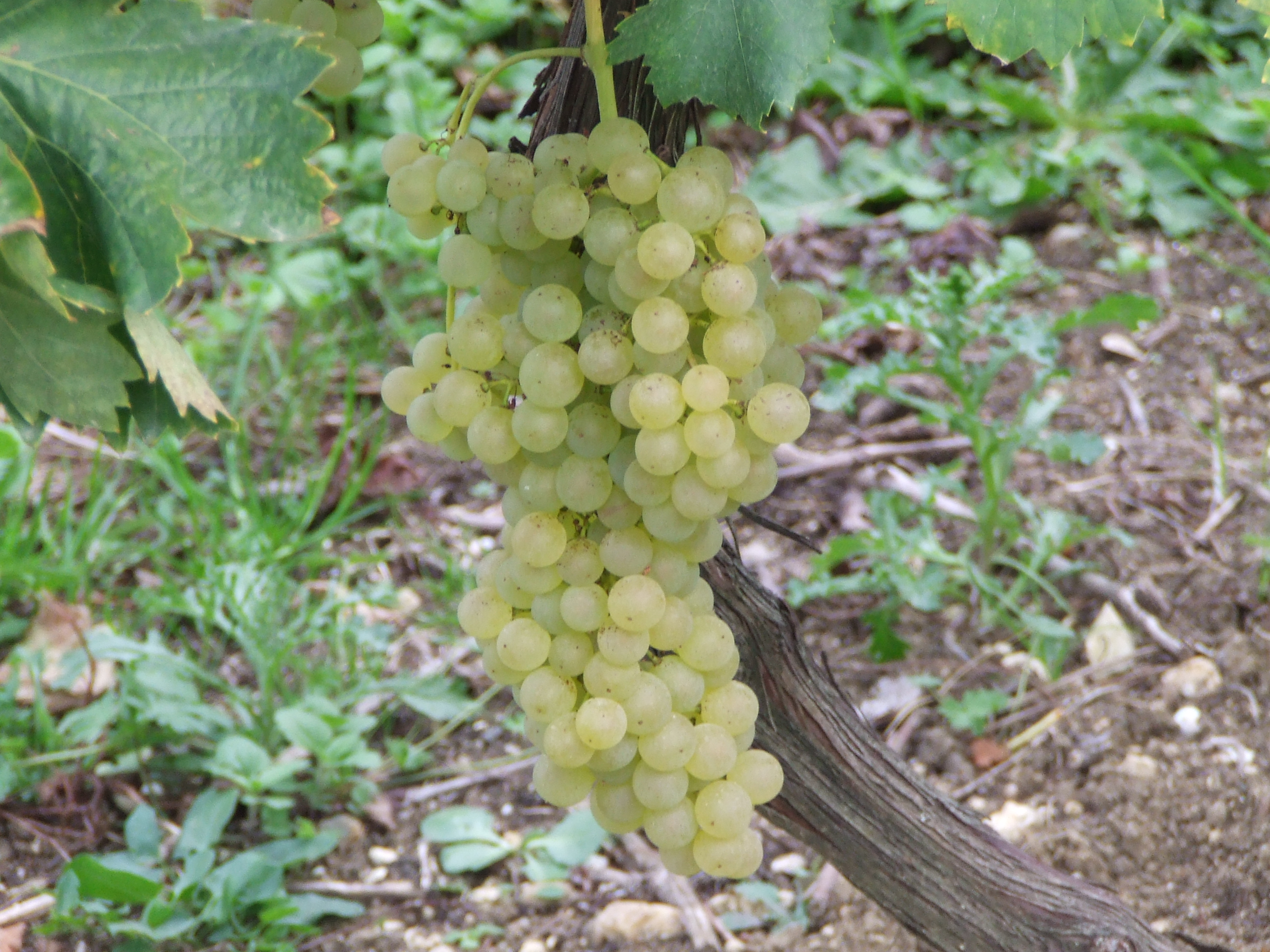
Ugni blanc, one of the parent varieties of Vidal blanc

Vidal blanc is a complex, hybrid varietal cultivated from grapevines belonging to several different species within the genus Vitis. One parent, Ugni blanc, is from the Vitis vinifera species of European grapevines that produce most of the world's well-known wines such as Cabernet Sauvignon and Chardonnay. Vidal blanc's second parent, Rayon d'Or, was a Seibel grape with itself also being an inter-specific crossing of Aramon du Gard and Seibel 405 (both inter-specific crossings themselves). Included in this extended family tree of Vidal blanc are varieties from the Vitis rupestris and Vitis aestivalis species and grapes produced by notable hybrid breeders Thomas Volney Munson, Hermann Jaeger and Albert Seibel.

== History ==
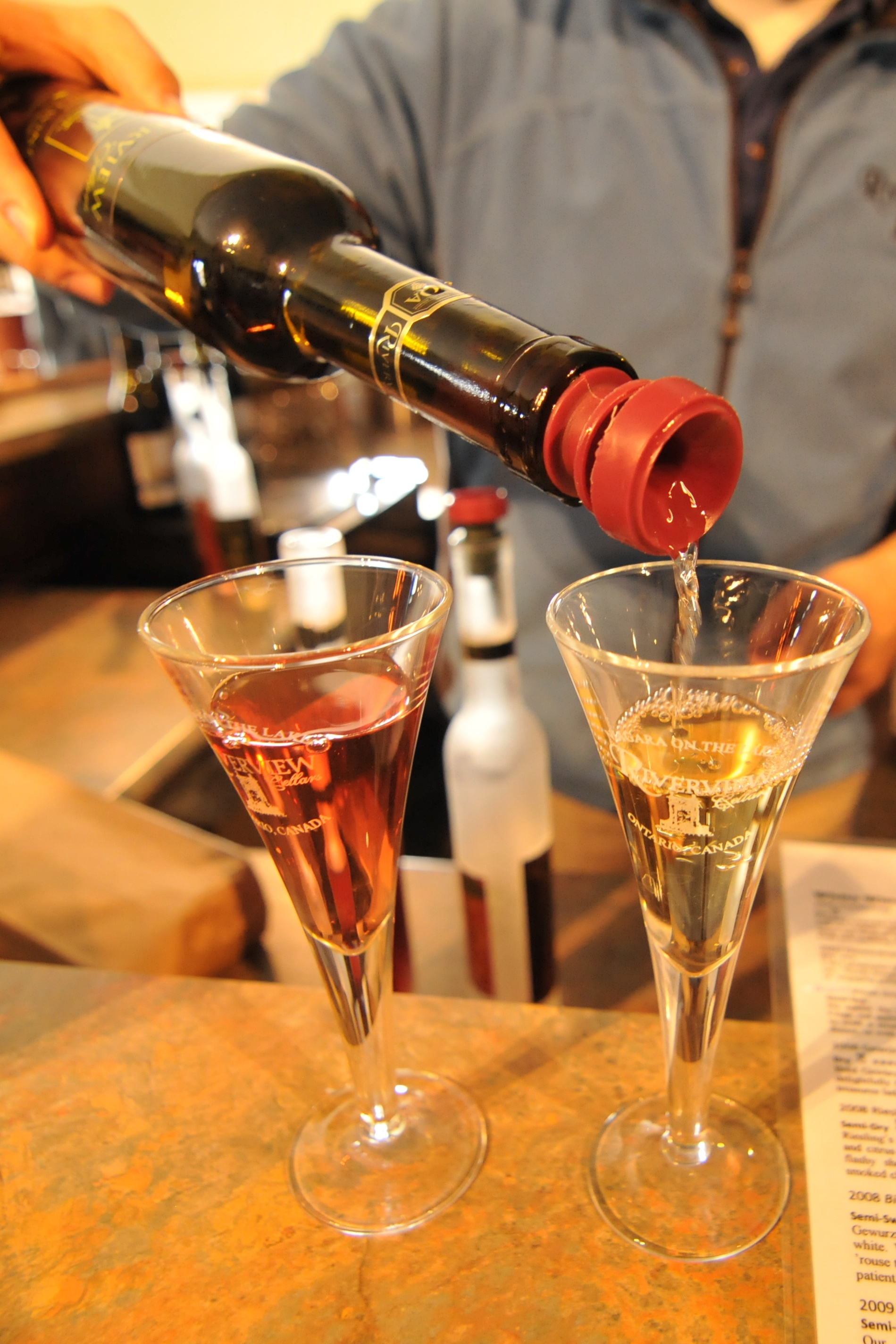
Vidal ice wines are a popular style of wine produced in Canada.

Vidal Blanc was created in the 1930s by French grape breeder Jean-Louis Vidal (1880-1976) as a potential variety to be used in cognac production in the maritime climate and cold winters of western France. To breed the grape, he cross-bred Ugni blanc (also known as Trebbiano) in Tuscany, the primary grape historically used in brandy production, and Rayon d'Or, a winter-hardy hybrid grape that was successfully used previously to breed Seyval blanc. Though the variety was created in France, today it is no longer an authorized grape variety with only a few rare plantings remaining in the Charente-Maritime department.

In the late 1940s, the grape was brought to Canada by Adhemar de Chaunac, a French enologist working for the Ontario wine producer T.G. Bright & Company (later known as Bright Wines). De Chaunac was responsible for bringing many Vitis vinifera and hybrid varieties to Canada to see which grapes could grow well in the Canadian climate. Vidal Blanc was one of the varieties that de Chaunac experimented with late harvest and leaving the grapes on the vines well into winter. However, the style of ice wine that Vidal blanc would become associated with didn't become commercially popular in Canada till the 1980s.

== Viticulture ==
Vidal blanc is a very winter-hardy variety, able to survive prolonged exposure to cold temperatures during the dormant winter season and produce viable secondary buds that will still yield a crop even after a late spring frost. It is a mid-ripening grape able to accumulate sufficient sugar levels to make dry wines but can also hang on the vine long in to the season to produce late-harvest and ice wine.

While the vine has some resistance to downy mildew, it can be very susceptible to powdery mildew and coulure as well as anthracnose. The long grape bunches of small berries can also be prone to developing botrytis bunch rot.

== Wine regions ==
Though Vidal blanc is no longer authorized in France or widely planted there, the grape has found success in North America where it is grown in many wine regions throughout Canada and the United States as well as Sweden.

=== Canada ===
First introduced to the country in the 1940s, Vidal blanc is widely grown throughout Canada with 777 hectares (1,920 acres) documented in 2008. In the 2019 VQA report, it was 7.6% of Canadian wine production with 471,981 bottles produced or 52,442 cases (9L). Most of the plantings are in the Ontario region, particularly the Niagara Peninsula, but the grape can also be found in British Columbia, Nova Scotia and Quebec. Here Vidal is often used to produce wines of all sweetness styles but is particularly noted for the quality of ice wines that can be made from the grape. Inniskillin, the world's largest producer of the ice wine style, makes ice wine from Vidal grapes grown in both Ontario and the Okanagan Valley of British Columbia. Another Okanagan Valley producer, Stag's Hollow, has cultivated the grape since the mid-1990s and has somewhat specialized in dry Vidal wines, e.g. Tragically Vidal, winning International competitions.

=== United States ===
While Vidal blanc is also used for ice wine production in the United States (particularly in the Finger Lakes region of New York and the Old Mission Peninsula AVA around Lake Michigan), it is more often used in the United States to produce dry or slightly sweet table wines. It is widely planted throughout the country, particularly in the east coast (Virginia and New York), Great Lakes region (Ohio, Michigan and Indiana) and Midwest (Missouri in the Augusta and Hermann AVAs).

In 2010, there were 150 acres (61 hectares) of Vidal blanc planted in Virginia in regions such as the Monticello AVA. Michigan had 145 acres (59 hectares) reported in 2006. In Indiana, there were 35 acres (14 hectares) of the grape in 2009 with Illinois reporting 32 acres (13 hectares) that same year mostly in the Shawnee Hills AVA. In 2009, Vidal blanc represented more than 7% of all grape plantings in the state of Missouri with 118 acres (48 hectares).

Other states growing Vidal blanc include Alabama, Arkansas (Ozark Mountain AVA), Connecticut (Western Connecticut Highlands AVA), Georgia, Iowa, Kansas, Kentucky, Maryland Catoctin AVA, Massachusetts, Minnesota, New Jersey (Outer Coastal Plain AVA), New Mexico (Middle Rio Grande Valley AVA), North Carolina (Yadkin Valley AVA), Ohio (Ohio River Valley AVA, Grand River Valley AVA and Isle St. George AVA), Pennsylvania (Lehigh Valley AVA and Lancaster Valley AVA), Rhode Island (Southeastern New England AVA), Tennessee, Vermont and West Virginia.

== Styles ==
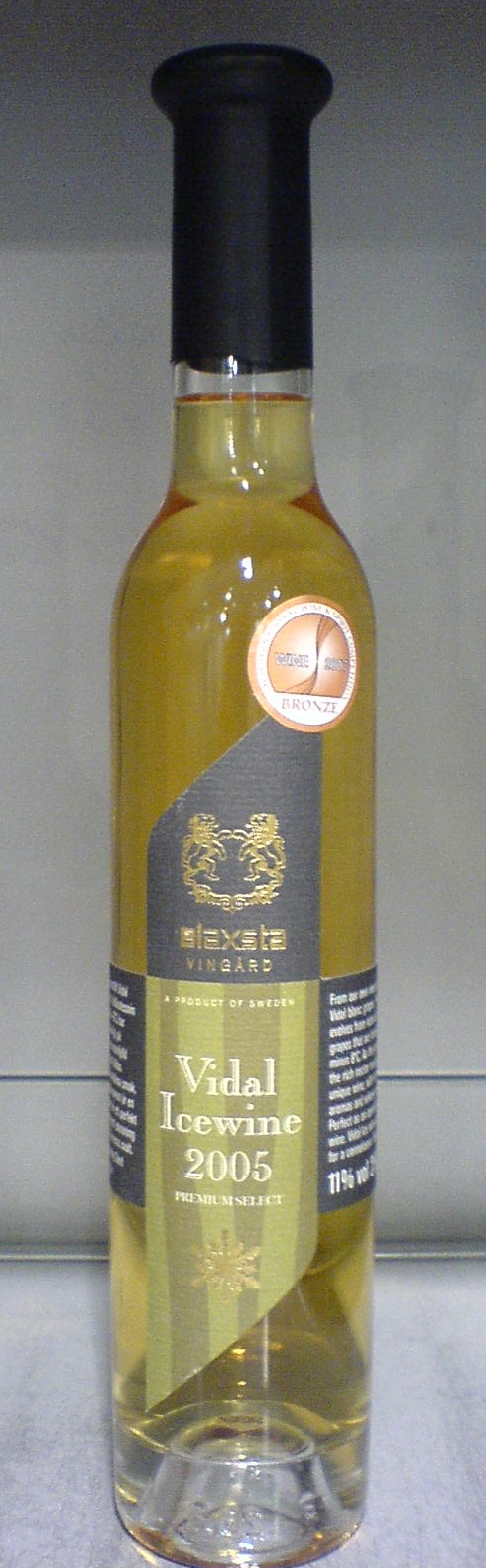
A Vidal ice wine made in Sweden

Vidal Blanc is noted for not having the characteristic "foxy" taste that it is identifiable with many hybrid-varieties which include American grapevines in their parentage. According to Master of Wine Jancis Robinson, Vidal blanc tends to produce wines with "bright and pure" fruit and acid levels that can balance out the sweetness of ice wines though the wines tend not to have much aging potential.

In comparing the ice wines made from Riesling to those of Vidal blanc, wine expert Oz Clarke also notes that Vidal wines tend not to have much aging potential but says that these wines usually have a rich concentration of intense fruit flavors.

In Missouri, dry styles of Vidal blanc are often full-bodied with a buttery mouthfeel that can be similar to Chardonnays that have gone through malolactic fermentation. The wine also tends to have noticeable acidity, similar to Seyval blanc, with well-made examples from favorable vintages tending to have a long finish.

In British Columbia, both dry and ice wine styles of Vidal blanc are marked by tropical aromas and strong fruity flavors.

== Synonyms ==
As a relatively recently produced hybrid variety, Vidal blanc has not been known under many synonyms with the only synonym recognized by the Vitis International Variety Catalogue (VIVC) being Vidal 256.
