= Swan Creek AVA =

American Viticultural Area in North Carolina

Coordinates: 36°11′21″N 80°53′40″W

Swan Creek
- Wine region
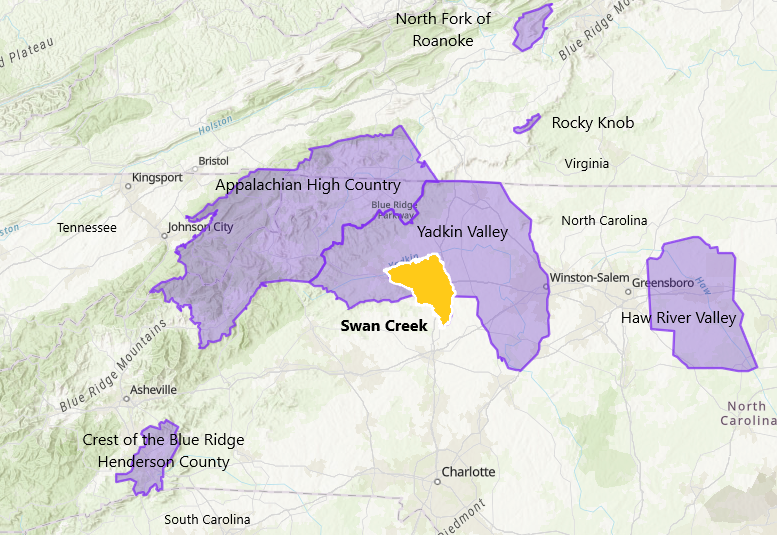
- Type: American Viticultural Area
- Year established: 2008
- Years of wine industry: 27
- Country: United States
- Part of: North Carolina, Yadkin Valley AVA
- Growing season: 170–190 days
- Climate region: Region IV
- Heat units: 42.8 to 68.9 °F (6.0–20.5 °C)
- Precipitation (annual average): 48.6 in (1,234.4 mm) snow: 6.3 in (160.0 mm)
- Soil conditions: Saprolite, soft clay-rich
- Total area: 96,000 acres (150 sq mi)
- Size of planted vineyards: 75 acres (30 ha)
- No. of vineyards: 10
- Varietals produced: Chambourcin, Petit Verdot, Traminette, Viognier, Montepulciano, Sangiovese, Pinot Grigio, Vermentino. Sagrantino, Petit Manseng
- No. of wineries: 8

Swan Creek is an American Viticultural Area (AVA) located in northwestern North Carolina, United States, within portions of Iredell, Wilkes and Yadkin Counties that lie on the Piedmont plateau region. It was established as the nation's 189^{th} and the state's second appellation on April 25, 2008 by the Alcohol and Tobacco Tax and Trade Bureau (TTB), Treasury after reviewing the petition submitted by Raffaldini Vineyards, on behalf of the Vineyards of Swan Creek, a trade association representing a group of local vineyards and wineries, proposing a viticultural area named "Swan Creek."

The appellation encompasses 96,000 acres (150 sq mi) with 75 acres (30 ha) of cultivation. The northern sixty percent of the Swan Creek AVA sits within the Yadkin Valley viticultural area, and the remaining 40 percent extends outside of the Yadkin Valley AVA southern boundary. Swan Lake AVA encircles the townships of Hamptonville, Harmony, Mooresville, Ronda, Wilkesboro and Yadkinville. The AVA shares its name with the unincorporated community of Swan Creek in Yadkin County.

The geographical name "Swan Creek" refers to a village in the approximate center of the viticultural area, as well as a Yadkin River tributary creek system. Swan Creek village sits in the Brushy Mountains south of the Yadkin River. East and West Swan Creeks run north from the mountains before joining as Swan Creek to the northwest of the village. The creek then empties into the Yadkin River approximately three miles west of Jonesville. Also, an undated State of North Carolina Department of Environment, Health, and Natural Resources document lists Swan Creek, West Swan Creek, and East Swan Creek as streams in the Yadkin-Pee Dee River Basin.

== History ==
A large portion of Swan Creek viticultural area lies within the larger geographical region named the Yadkin Valley, and its namesake AVA, shares a similar history. Rich historical and anthropological evidence of settlement and cultivation in the Yadkin Valley and Swan Creek exists. Native American settlements date back to approximately 500 B.C. The first non-Native settlers arrived in the 1750s. They originally scouted land in the Blue Ridge Mountains west of Swan Creek region near Boone, North Carolina, but unable to find a satisfactory site for settlement. These settlers continued east, following the Yadkin River through the Swan Creek region until reaching the three forks of the Muddy Creek, a tributary of the Yadkin River. The settlements of Bethabara and Bethania were established east of the Swan Creek region in what is now Forsyth and Stokes counties. Bethabara was a fortified settlement built to protect early settlers from attacks by Indians who swept down into the Yadkin Valley north of the Swan Creek region from the Blue Ridge Mountains during the French and Indian War. Smaller settlements throughout Wilkes, Yadkin and Iredell Counties were made during this period.

References to non-Native settlements in the Swan Creek region are found as early as the 1780s. Historic manuscripts also maintain that frontiersman Daniel Boone homesteaded in the Swan Creek region in the 1750s when the Yadkin Valley was the westernmost frontier of the North Carolina colony. He traveled along the Yadkin River among his various homesteads going through the Blue Ridge Mountains on the Wilderness Road into Tennessee then Kentucky. During the Revolutionary War, soldiers traveled along the Yadkin River (the northern boundary line of the Swan Creek AVA), en route to the pivotal battle at Kings Mountain in South Carolina. Also, during the Civil War, Union Major General George Stoneman led troops eastward through Swan Creek to Virginia. After the Civil War, the Swan Creek area turned to farming, which continues to characterize this rural region despite the urban development in other portions of the Yadkin Valley viticultural area. Today, viticulture in the Swan Creek comprises 75 acres (30 ha) of cultivation.

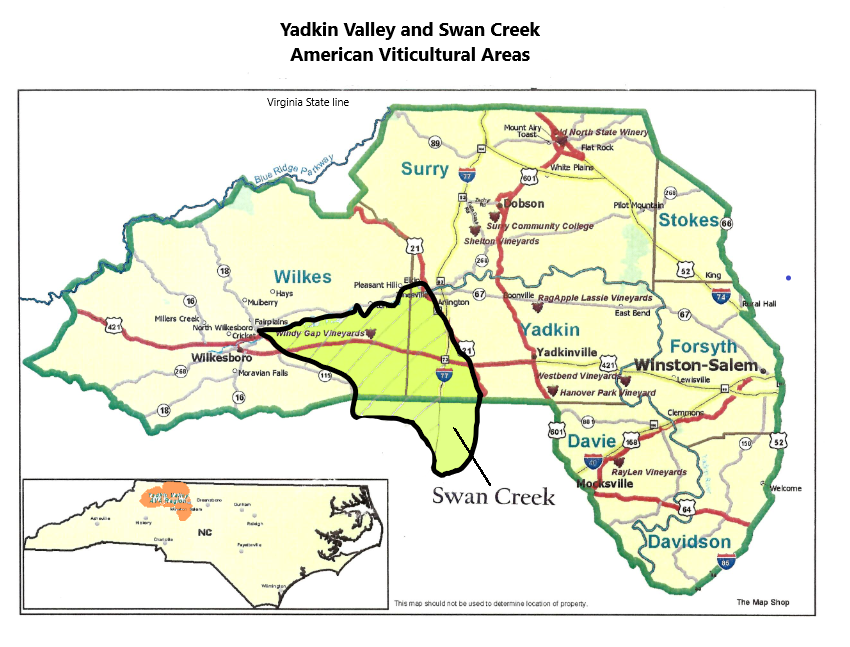
Yadkin Valley & Swan Creek AVAs ©TTB

== Terroir ==
Swan Creek viticultural area's geographical location is responsible for the temperate climate and homogenous soil situated in the moderate elevations of the Brushy Mountains, and bordering the Yadkin River. The geology of the Swan Creek region with its minor climatic variation creates distinguishing viticultural features defining boundary distinctions. The entire Swan Creek viticultural area lies within the Yadkin River Basin. The general uniformity in the Swan Creek soils is attributable to the natural weathering process of the Brushy Mountains and the Brevard Shear Zone, a major fault system that also defines the Blue Ridge Escarpment in the area. The homogeneous soil within the viticultural area is unlike the varied soils and rock types found in other parts of the Yadkin Valley viticultural area. The Swan Creek viticultural area boundaries overlaps the established Yadkin Valley viticultural area as illustrated. The northern 60 percent of the Swan Creek viticultural area sits within the Yadkin Valley viticultural area, with the remaining 40 percent south of the Yadkin Valley viticultural boundary lines.

=== Topography ===
The Brushy Mountains, an isolated spur of the Blue Ridge, are among the oldest mountain ranges in the world (by some estimates up to 1 billion years old), run through the center of the Swan Creek region, with elevations in the viticultural area varying between 1,000 and 2,000 ft (305–610 m), according to the USGS maps submitted with the petition. The Brushy Mountains, within the viticultural area, have elevations lower than the Blue Ridge Mountains to the west but higher than the other surrounding areas, according to the USGS maps. The Blue Ridge Mountain region to the immediate west of the boundary line rises to elevations of 3,000 to 5,000 ft (914–1,524 m). To the east and south of the viticultural area, the elevation drops between 500 and 1,000 ft (152–305 m).

=== Climate ===
Swan Creek AVA has a slightly cooler climate than the rest of the Yadkin Valley AVA—average annual maximum temperatures are 0.6 °F (0.33 °C) and average annual minimums are a full 2 °F (1.1 °C) lower. Rainfall averages approximately 48.6 in (1,230 mm) with an additional average of 6.3 in (16 cm) of snow per year. Both the Yadkin River, running adjacent to the Swan Creek viticultural area's northern boundary line, and the Brushy Mountains that lie within the viticultural area boundary, serve as climatically moderating influences. The Swan Creek region has an average annual high temperature of 68.9 °F (20.5 °C) and an average annual low temperature of 42.8 °F (6.0 °C). The Southeast Regional Climate Center (SERCC) of the National Climatic Data Center shows data shows that the Swan Creek area is generally warmer than the regions to the west and northwest, cooler than the regions to the south and east, and slightly cooler than the Yadkin Valley as a whole. Also, average January temperatures of 20 to 25 °F (−7 to −4 °C) make the Swan Creek region less prone to Pierce's Disease, which adversely affects vineyards, than the majority of the Yadkin Valley viticultural area. Swan Creek viticultural area averages 3,576 degree days of heat accumulation annually, which puts it in climatic Region IV, according to temperature data collected by the SERCC. (As a measure of heat accumulation, each degree that a day's mean temperature is above 50 °F (10 °C), which is the minimum temperature required for grapevine growth, is counted as one degree day. The surrounding areas, based on Amerine and Winkler heat summation definitions, include climatic Regions IV and V to the east, Region V to the south, and Region I to the west-northwest. The frost-free season of the Swan Creek viticultural area extends on average from April 19 to October 17 annually, according to the "Average Last Spring Frost Dates for Selected North Carolina Locations," horticulture information leaflets (published December 1996 and revised December 1998), by Katharine Perry, North Carolina State University. According the petition, this frost-free season is nearly identical to Surry County, which is part of the Yadkin Valley viticultural area located immediately northeast of the Swan Creek viticultural area. However, southeast of the viticultural area, but also within the Yadkin Valley viticultural area, the Davidson County frost-free season averages from March 31 to October 31, resulting in a month less frost than in the Swan Creek viticultural area. The frost-free season in counties outside the Yadkin Valley viticultural area and the Swan Creek viticultural area varies, extending three weeks longer to the east, but lasting four to six weeks less in regions to the west and northwest. In addition, the growing season of the Swan Creek viticultural area averages 170 to 190 days annually, according to Perry's "Average Growing Seasons for Selected North Carolina Locations," horticulture information leaflets (published December 1996 and revised December 1998). Again, this growing season is almost identical to the county immediately northeast, located within the Yadkin Valley viticultural area. However, according to Perry's data, Davidson County averages a 214-day growing season annually, or between 24 and 44 more growing days than the Swan Creek viticultural area. Similarly, the petition shows that Guilford County to the east has an annual growing season of between 199 and 210 days. Counties to the west and northwest of the Swan Creek region have a significantly shorter growing season, lasting an average of 139 to 162 days. The USDA plant hardiness zone range from 7b to 8a.

=== Precipitation ===
Swan Creek AVA's moderate rainfall is attributed to the protective influence of the Brushy Mountains. Rainfall within the Swan Creek viticultural area averages 48.6 in (1,234.4 mm) annually, based on SERCC data, with the local grape growers surveyed by the petitioner recording less rainfall at their own weather stations. The areas to the west and northwest of the viticultural area average 57 in (1,448 mm) each year, while regions to the south and east average 44.4 in (1,127.8 mm) of rain annually. Furthermore, snowfall within the Swan Creek viticultural area averages 6.3 in (160.0 mm) annually, based on SERCC records, which is far less than the data recorded at weather stations in surrounding areas.

=== Geology ===
The geology of the Swan Creek viticultural area, with documentation and evidence provided for the petition by Matthew Mayberry of the Mayberry Land Company, Elkin, North Carolina, is shaped by plate tectonics and a spectrum of uplift and erosion for the entire Appalachian Mountains building cycle. The Swan Creek region is part of the larger Appalachian Mountain Range area that has gone through at least three cycles of uplift and erosion, with each cycle lasting around 300 million years. Also, the weathering and erosion cycles created the resulting Piedmont and Blue Ridge surfaces found in the viticultural area today. Mr. Mayberry explains that the four predominant rock types in the viticultural area are Henderson Gneiss, Granite, Biotite Gneiss and Biotite Amphibolite Gneiss, and Sillimanite Mica Schist. These types make up more than 90 percent of the Swan Creek area, with the latter three composing about 80 percent of the southern part of the area. Along the north boundary line at the Yadkin River the predominant rock types include Ashe Formation, Utramafics, and Granitic Rocks of the Crossnore Group.

=== Soil ===
The soil information in the Swan Creek viticultural area petition is compiled from the published soil surveys of Wilkes, Yadkin, and Iredell Counties in North Carolina. Roy Mathis, Soil Specialist for Correlations, Natural Resources Conservation Service, United States Department of Agriculture, provided the soil information included in the petition. The areas surrounding the Swan Creek viticultural area have soils with differing characteristics, Mr. Mathis explains. The areas to the south and east have high shrink-swell clayey soils, which are less desirable for agriculture. To the west and north are the mountainous rocks and soils of the encroaching Blue Ridge Mountains. Also, the Yadkin Valley viticultural area, which surrounds the Swan Creek viticultural area to the west, north, and east, has a greater variety of soil types and temperature regimes. The Swan Creek viticultural area mesic temperature regime has soil temperatures of 47 to 59 °F (8–15 °C) at the depth of 20 in (51 cm), according to Mr. Mathis. In comparison, the Yadkin Valley viticultural area is in both the mesic and thermic temperature regimes, with soil temperatures much warmer at 59 to 72 °F (15–22 °C) at the same soil depth. Mr. Mathis explains that the soils in the Swan Creek viticultural area are primarily saprolite, a soft, clay-rich soil derived from weathered felsic (acidic) metamorphic rocks of the Inner Piedmont Belt such as granites, schists, and gneisses. The region includes a small area of Sauratown Belt with the rocks being primarily metagraywacke. In contrast, the surrounding west and north areas include residuum (saprolite) weathered from felsic metamorphic rocks such as gneisses, schists, and phyllites of the Blue Ridge Geologic Belt and Smith River Allochothon. The saprolite in the surrounding area to the east is composed of weathered igneous intrusive rocks like granites, gabbros and diorites, as well as some gneisses and schists of the Charlotte Belt. Evard and Cowee soils, which have moderate permeability and are well-drained with a loamy surface and sub-soil layer, predominate in the Brushy Mountains. Yet the dominant ridge top soils of the Swan Creek viticultural area include the Fairview and Clifford series. These soils have sandy clay loam or clay loam surface layers with red clayey sub-soils, and are well-drained with moderate permeability. Rhodhiss series is the dominant soil on the steep side slopes within the viticultural area boundary. This well-drained soil has a loamy surface and moderate permeability at the sub-soil level. Mr. Mathis notes that Fairview, Clifford, and Rhodhiss soils all have bedrock deeper than 60 in (152 cm). The Yadkin River, at the northern boundary of the Swan Creek viticultural area, has alluvial soil diversity with textures and drainage. In general, most of the Swan Creek viticultural area soils are acidic and low in natural fertility.

== Viticulture ==
Panoramic views of the Yadkin Valley and the Blue Ridge Mountains are the backdrop of an environment to grow the Swan Creek viticulture industry. The vineyards and wineries enjoy a specific microclimate that allows the fruit to ripen well but retain good acidity and balance. The industry began in the late 90s when local vineyards were transformed from retired tobacco fields leading to Swan Creek's recognition as an AVA in 2008. A blend of old-world European techniques and modern technology are producing French and Italian vinifera varieties in the natural western North Carolina environment. Area wineries have produced vintages that were awarded at North Carolina's nationally renown NC Fine Wines Competition.

== Wineries ==
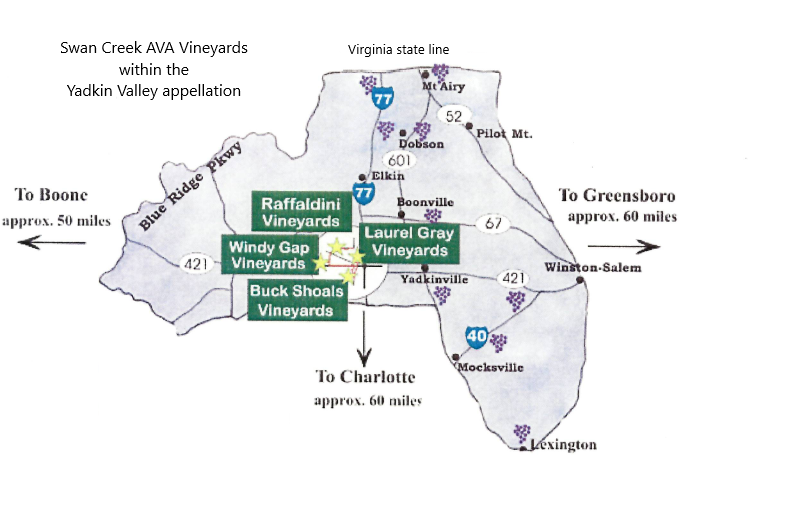
Swan Creek Vineyards (2008)

- Castello Barone Vineyards and Winery
- Chateau Jourdain LLC/The Vineyard Cottage LLC
- Dobbins Creek Vineyards
- Dynamis Estate Wines
- Laurel Gray Vineyards
- Midnight Magdalena Vineyards
- Piccione Vineyards
- Raffaldini Vineyards
- Shadow Springs Vineyard
- Sotrio Vineyards & Winery
- Stardust Cellars
- Windsor Run Cellars
