= Traminette =

Variety of grape

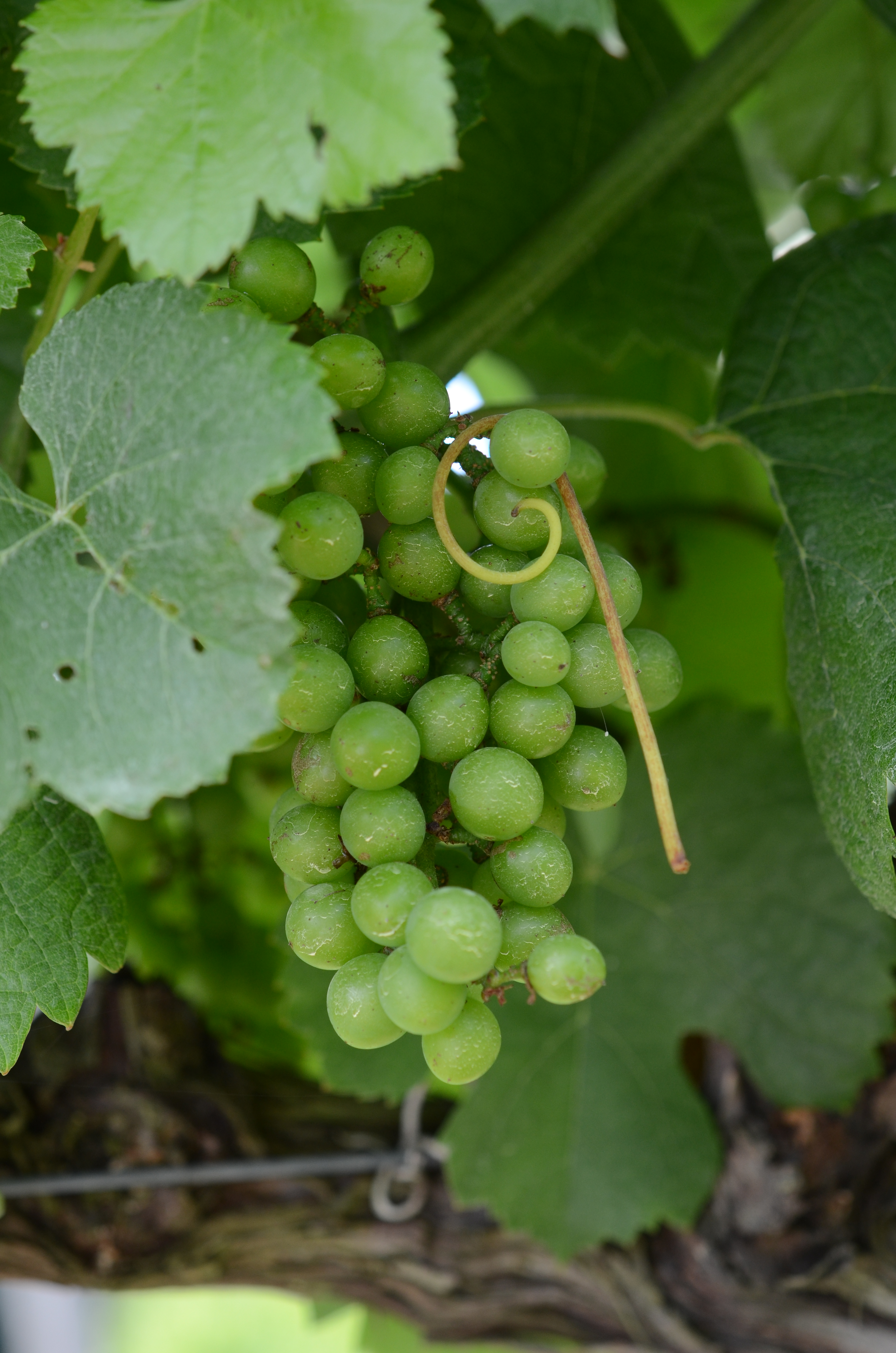
A bunch of Traminette grapes on the vine.

Traminette is a cross of the French-American hybrid Joannes Seyve 23.416 and the German Vitis vinifera cultivar Gewürztraminer made by Herb C. Barrett circa 1965 at the University of Illinois Urbana-Champaign. He sent the seeds to the New York State Agricultural Experiment Station grape breeding program at Cornell University for development when he departed from Illinois.

Traminette was found to have excellent wine quality, combined with good productivity, partial resistance to several fungal diseases, and cold hardiness superior to its acclaimed parent, Gewürztraminer, while retaining a similar character. Traminette produces solid yields, ranging in studies from 12 to 22 lbs/vine average.

== Description ==
Traminette grapes are a green color with moderately loose clusters. The vines are moderately winter hardy, though trunk injury is occasionally a problem. The flowers of Traminette are self-fertile. The fruit and leaves are moderately resistant to powdery mildew (Erysiphe necator), black rot (Guignardia bidwellii), and Botrytis bunch rot (Botrytis cinerea).

== Usage ==
Wine from the Traminette grape has been described as spicy and fragrant, similar to the Gewürztraminer from which it was crossed, but differs in structure and mouthfeel. Traminette maintains a lower, more favorable, wine pH.

Traminette wine has been chosen by the Indiana Wine Grape Council as the signature wine of the state. The wine is also produced in some regions of Ohio, the Yadkin Valley AVA (American Viticultural Area) of North Carolina, the Outer Coastal Plain AVA of New Jersey, the Shawnee Hills AVA of Illinois, the Finger Lakes AVA and Niagara Escarpment AVA of New York, and parts of Virginia, as well as in Pennsylvania, Michigan, and Southern New England.

== History ==
Herb C. Barrett crossed Joannes Seyve 23.416 with Gewürztraminer at the University of Illinois Urbana-Champaign in 1965 and Traminette resulted. Barrett's intention was to produce a large-clustered table grape with the flavor of Gewürztraminer. After the resulting seeds were sent to Cornell's grape breeding program, they were planted in New York in 1968. Fruit were observed in 1971 and the vines were propagated in 1974 under the identifier NY65.533.13.

Cornell University did not apply a plant patent for Traminette in 1996, but made cuttings available for sale in 1997 from nurseries in New York and Missouri.
