= Hermann AVA =

American Viticultural Area in Missouri

Coordinates: 38°41′51″N 91°26′49″W

Hermann
- Wine region
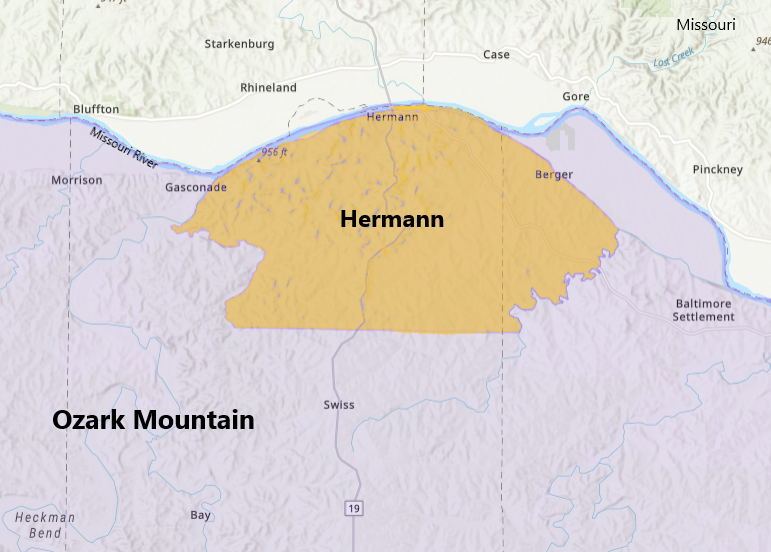
- Type: American Viticultural Area
- Year established: 1983
- Years of wine industry: 179
- Country: United States
- Part of: Missouri, Ozark Mountain AVA
- Other regions in Missouri, Ozark Mountain AVA: Ozark Highlands AVA
- Growing season: 156 days
- Climate region: Continental
- Precipitation (annual average): 39.55 in (1,005 mm)
- Soil conditions: silty loam and fertile loess
- Total area: 51,200 acres (80 sq mi)
- Size of planted vineyards: 102 acres (41 ha)
- Grapes produced: Chambourcin, Norton, Seyval blanc, St. Vincent, Steuben, Traminette, Vidal blanc, Vignoles
- No. of wineries: 7

Hermann is an American Viticultural Area (AVA) located in northern portion of Gasconade and Franklin Counties on the southern banks of the Missouri River. It was established as the nation's 36th and the state's second AVA on August 18, 1983, by the Bureau of Alcohol, Tobacco and Firearms (ATF), Treasury after reviewing the petition submitted by Jim Bias, president of Bias Vineyards & Winery, and Jim Held, president of Stone Hill Wine Co., on behalf of local vintners proposing the viticultural area in central Missouri, along the Missouri River, known as "Hermann."

The wine appellation is named after the town of Hermann, about halfway between St. Louis and Jefferson City. The AVA expands across the northernmost hills of the Ozark Plateau with many of the 200 acres (81 ha) of vineyards planted along south-facing slopes. As of 2007, seven wineries were sourcing grapes in the appellation, including Missouri's largest winery, Stone Hill Winery. The area is a flood plain with alluvial soil deposits up to 30 feet (9.1 m) deep. Growing conditions have been compared to those in southern and eastern Germany. The USDA plant hardiness zone is 6a. A wide variety of grapes are grown in Hermann, including Vitis vinifera, Vitis labrusca, and French hybrids.

== History ==
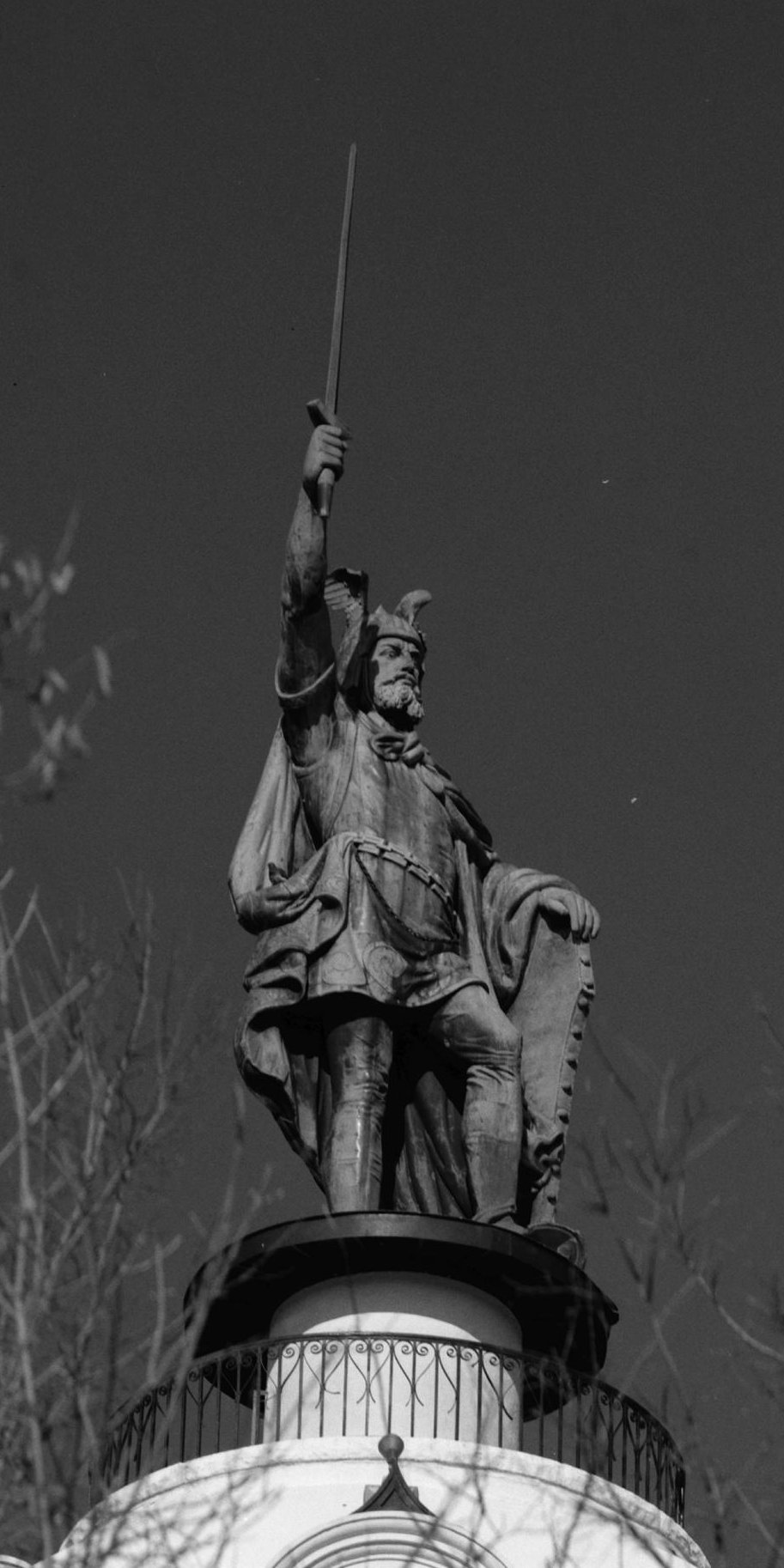
Statue of Hermann (Latin name Arminius), namesake of the Hermann region.

The Hermann area was founded in 1836 by settlers from the German Settlement Society. Pioneer leader George Bayer selected a location along the banks of the Missouri River for its similarities to the Rheingau region that many of the settlers came from. The area was named Hermann after Arminius of Germania, a chieftain of the Germanic Cherusci tribe, who defeated three Roman legions in the Battle of the Teutoburg Forest in 9 AD. This "Second Fatherland" was intended for German immigrants to be a self-supporting refuge for their heritage and traditions. The settlers established a joint-stock company and advertised widely throughout the United States and Germany, seeking farmers, laborers, winemakers and artisans to establish what they called a "German Athens of the West."

Winemaking and viticulture were quickly established in Hermann and by 1852 there were more than 470 acres (190 ha) planted to grape vines. Several modern Hermann wineries can trace their origins to this period. Stone Hill's cellars were constructed in 1847, the Hermanhoff Winery was founded in 1852 and Adam Puchta Winery, in 1855, was founded by immigrants from Oberkotzau, Bavaria who had struck gold during the California Gold Rush before returning to Hermann. At the turn of the 20th century, Stone Hill Winery was the third largest winery in the world, producing over 1,250,000 US gallons (4,700,000 L) of wine and achieving favorable results at international wine competitions.

Prohibition in the United States completely wiped out the commercial wine industry in Hermann. The large underground cellars of Stone Hill Winery were converted to mushroom farms and most of the vineyards were uprooted and planted with corn, oat, wheat and barley. After the Repeal of Prohibition in 1933, the Great Depression and World War II, it was several decades until the Hermann wine industry recovered when the original wineries reopened: Stone Hill in 1965, Hermannhof in 1974 and Adam Puchta in 1989. Today, there is around 200 acres (81 ha) under vine with the Hermann Wine Trail as the primer enotourism guide of the Missouri Rhineland.

== Viticulture ==
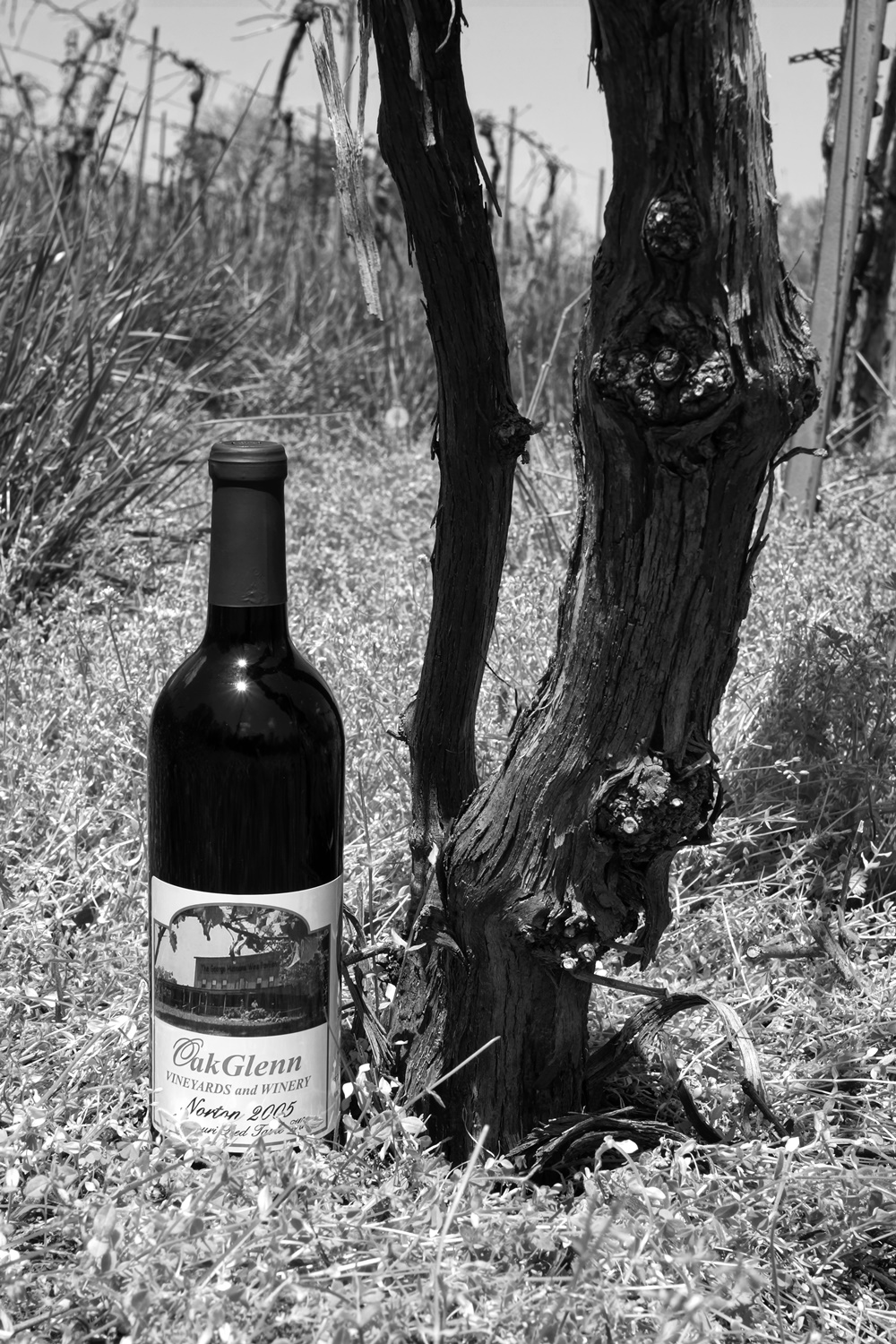
Norton vintage alongside an estimated 170-year-old Norton (Cynthiana) vine cultivated by legendary American vintner George Hussman, considered the "father of Missouri viticulture", on his original property. The vines are now cultivated by OakGlenn Winery of Hermann and still produces fruit.

A wide variety of grapes are grown in Hermann, including the Vitis vinifera Riesling and Cabernet Sauvignon, the Vitis labrusca Concord and Catawba, the Vitis aestivalis variety Norton (Cynthiana), and several hybrid varieties including Chambourcin, Seyval blanc, St. Vincent, Steuben, Traminette, Vidal blanc, Vignoles, Chardonel, Cayuga, Edelweiss and De Chaunac.

The region also produces a wide variety of wine styles ranging from sweet late harvest dessert wines and fortified wines, including port-style and solera made sherry-style wines to drier still red, white and rosés. Many fruit wines are also produced, usually from cherry, strawberry or raspberries.

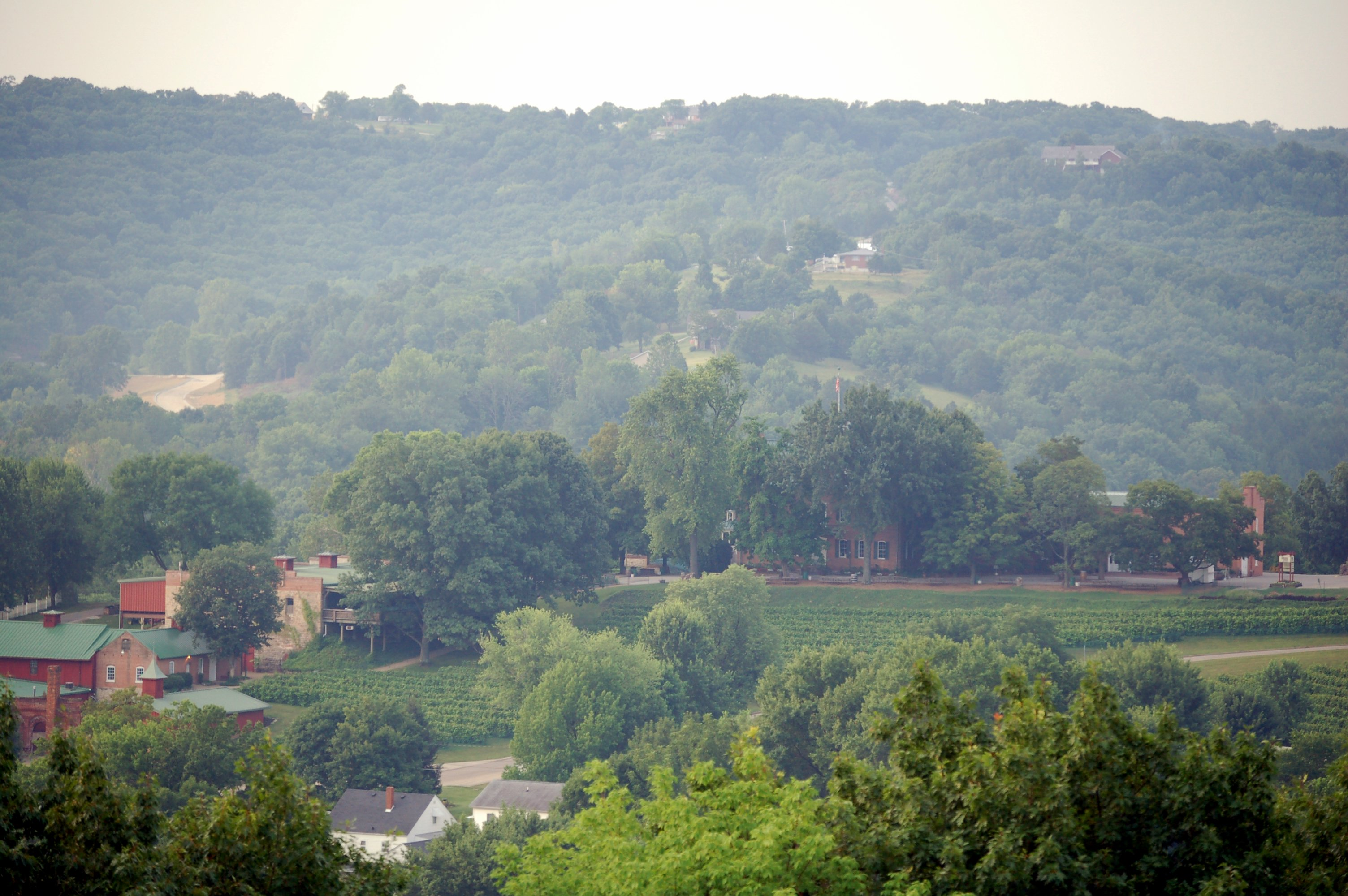
The Ozark hills overlooking Stone Hill Winery and Vineyards

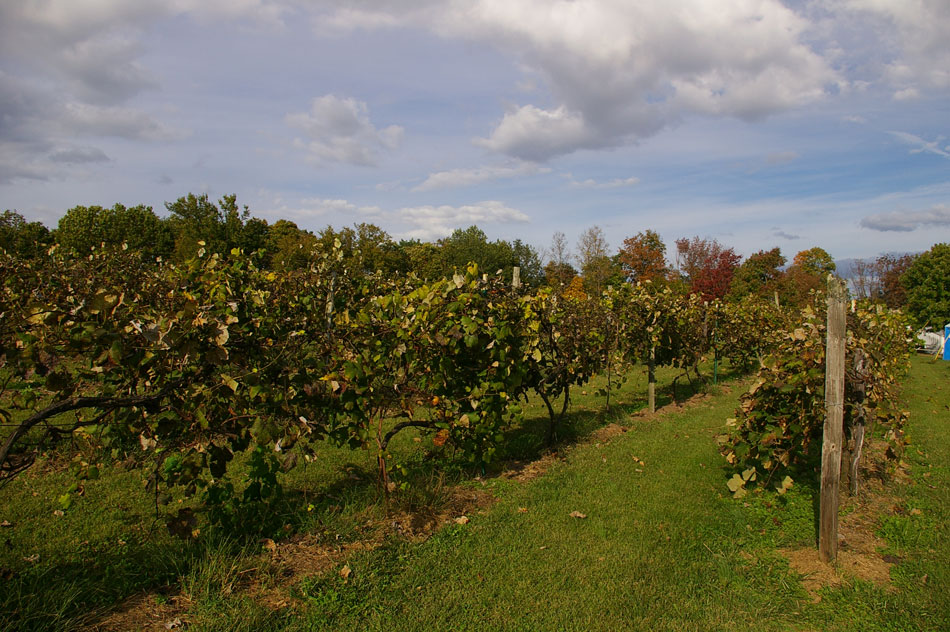
Hermann Vineyards

== See also ==
- List of wineries in Missouri
- Missouri Rhineland
