= Augusta AVA =

American Viticultural Area in Missouri

Coordinates: 38°35′40″N 90°51′42″W

Augusta
- Wine region
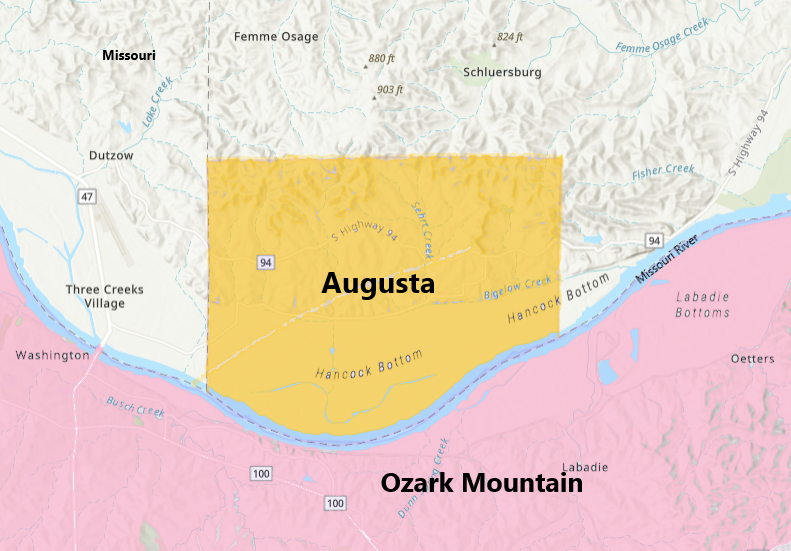
- Type: American Viticultural Area
- Year established: 1980
- Country: United States
- Part of: Missouri
- Other regions in Missouri: Hermann AVA, Loess Hills District AVA, Ozark Highlands AVA, Ozark Mountain AVA
- Growing season: 188 days
- Climate region: humid continental/humid subtropical
- Precipitation (annual average): 20+ inches (510+ mm)
- Soil conditions: loess and glacial till
- Total area: 15 sq mi (9,600 acres)
- Grapes produced: Cabernet Franc, Cabernet Sauvignon, Chambourcin, Chardonel, Chardonnay, Couderc noir, Norton, Rayon d'Or, Seyval blanc, St. Vincent, Vidal blanc, Vignoles
- No. of wineries: 4

Augusta is an American Viticultural Area (AVA) in the Missouri Rhineland entirely within the state of Missouri in the United States. It encompasses 9,600 acres (15 sq mi) within St. Charles County surrounding the city of Augusta located approximately 40 miles (64 km) west of St. Louis. It was established on June 20, 1980 by the Bureau of Alcohol, Tobacco and Firearms (ATF), and was the initial appellation designated in the United States.

Augusta AVA is adjacent to the 35 million acres (55,000 sq mi) multi-state Ozark Mountain AVA, established in 1986, whose northern boundary outlines the southern bank of the Missouri River and expands south into northern Arkansas and northeastern Oklahoma.

== History ==
The town of Augusta, situated on the hills overlooking the Missouri River Valley about 37 miles (60 km) west of Saint Louis, was founded in 1836 by Leonard Harold, a follower of Daniel Boone, for a riverboat landing along the Missouri. Harold originally laid out the town as Mount Pleasant on part of the government land he purchased in 1821. The town site was chosen as an excellent river landing known as Augusta Bend. In 1855, the town was incorporated as the city of Augusta becoming a prosperous agricultural community, producing mainly grain, livestock, and wine grapes. The town, as a trading center, supported numerous craftsmen, merchants, hotels, and wineries. In 1859, German immigrants Georg and Friedrich Muench founded one of the earliest wineries in the area, Mount Pleasant Winery. The 1872 Missouri River valley floods changed the course of the river abandoning the riverboat landing leaving dry land with a distinct soil type between the town and the river. The area's early vineyards were planted in the 1880s and began receiving recognition for the distinctive flavor profile of the wine being produced there. In the later parts of the 19th and early 20th century, the area's production volume helped the Missouri wine industry compete with Ohio for market share east of the Rocky Mountains. The advent of the national Prohibition had a dramatic effect causing winery closures and vineyards being uprooted. The revival period in the 1960s led to the reopening and founding of many area wineries.

The Augusta AVA petition was submitted by Clayton W. Byer, president of Montelle Vineyards, and Lucian W. Dressel, president of Mount Pleasant Vineyards, on behalf of local vintners proposing a viticultural area along the north bank of the Missouri River named "Augusta." The AVA was established on June 20, 1980 by the Bureau of Alcohol, Tobacco and Firearms (ATF). The nation's second appellation, Napa Valley was established eight months later in Napa County, California, which had been made famous by their top-rated vintages in the iconic Paris Wine Tasting of 1976 wine competition.

At the advent of the 21st century, Augusta AVA wines began exporting to Germany. In 2003, Augusta Winery's 2001 Chardonel vintage won "Best US Wine" from the German wine magazine Selection at their yearly competition in Mainz.

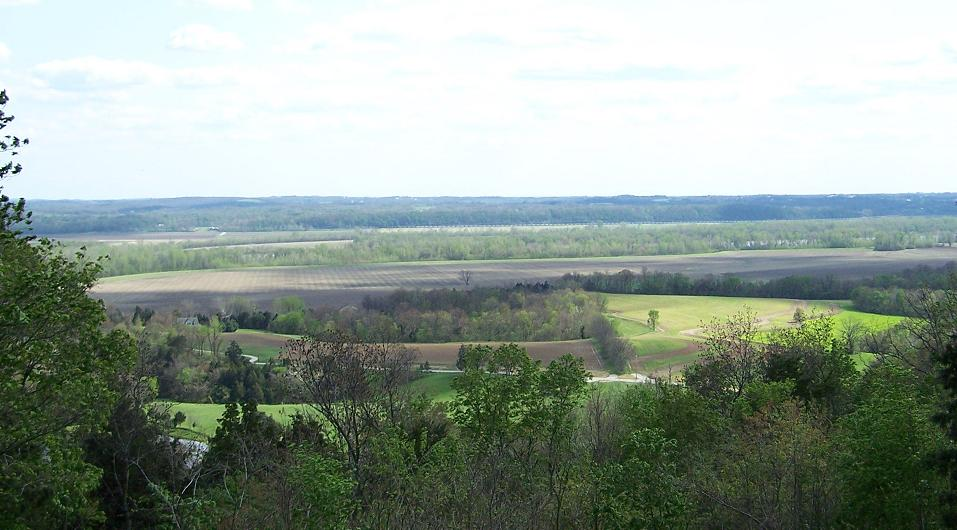
Montelle Winery overlooking the Missouri River Valley near Augusta

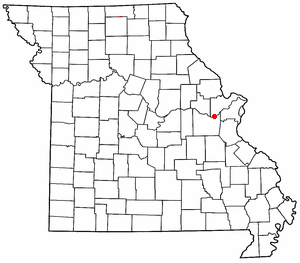

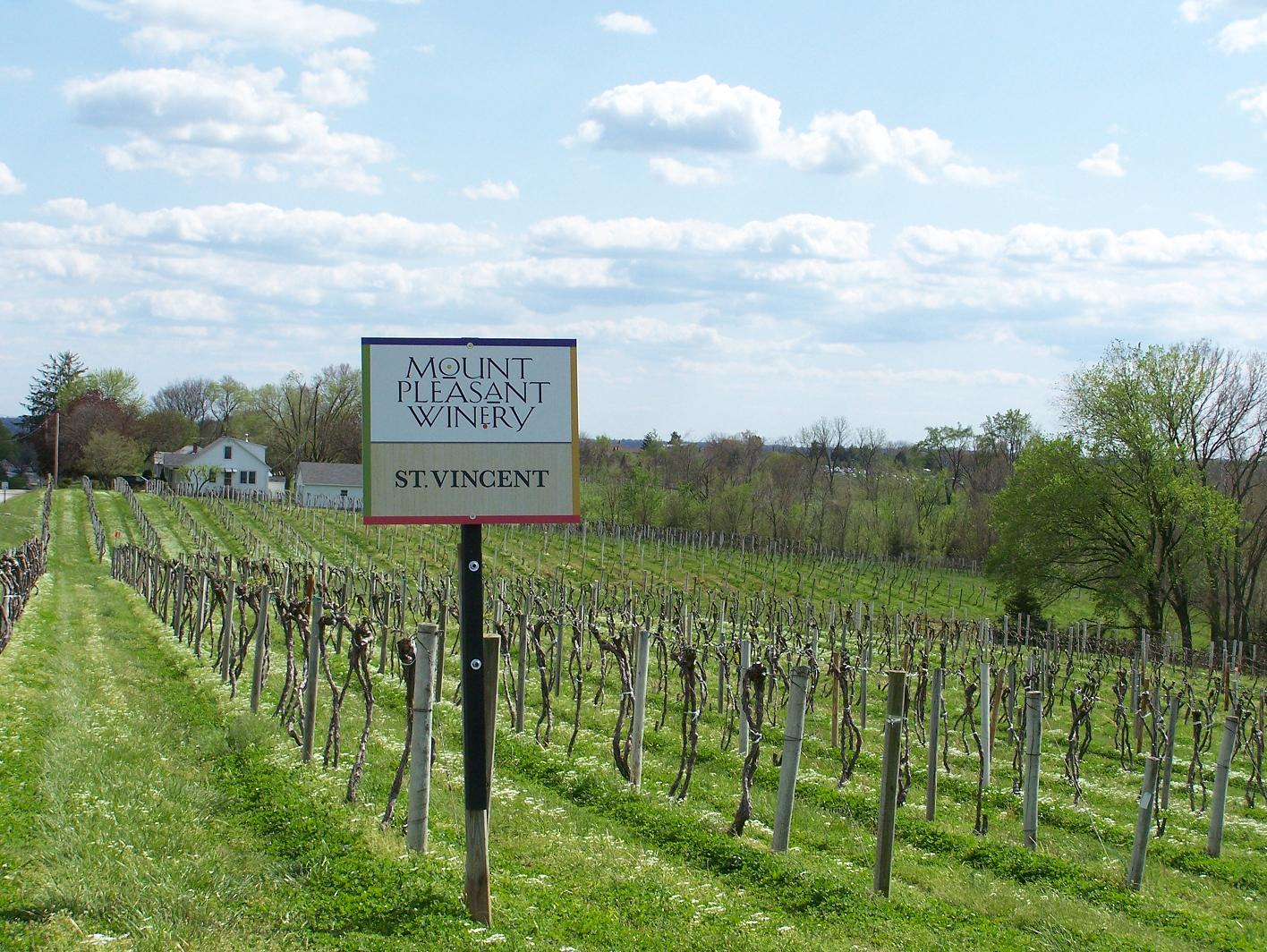
St. Vincent vines along Route 94

== Terroir ==
The bowl-like ridge of hills to the west, north, and east and the Missouri River on the southern edge of the area provide a setting which differentiates the local climate of the Augusta area from the local climate of the surrounding areas. Located 37 miles (60 km) west of St. Louis along the Missouri River, the area is known for its flood and alluvial plain landforms shaped by the winding river. The soil in this area is a type of loam known as Hayne Silt-Loam which is heaviest in clay composition in the areas closest to the river but has more silt concentration in the higher elevations where most of the vineyards are located. The USDA plant hardiness zone is 6b.

== Viticulture ==
Augusta viticultural area cultivates some Vitis vinifera including Cabernet Franc, Cabernet Sauvignon and Chardonnay as well the indigenous Vitis aestivalis, Norton varietal, the official grape of the State of Missouri. French-American hybrid grapes like Chambourcin, Chardonel, Couderc noir, Rayon d'Or, Seyval blanc, St. Vincent and Vidal blanc are also popular plantings.
