= Ozark Highlands AVA =

American Viticultural Area located in southern Missouri

Coordinates: 38°02′05″N 91°36′57″W

Ozark Highlands
- Wine region
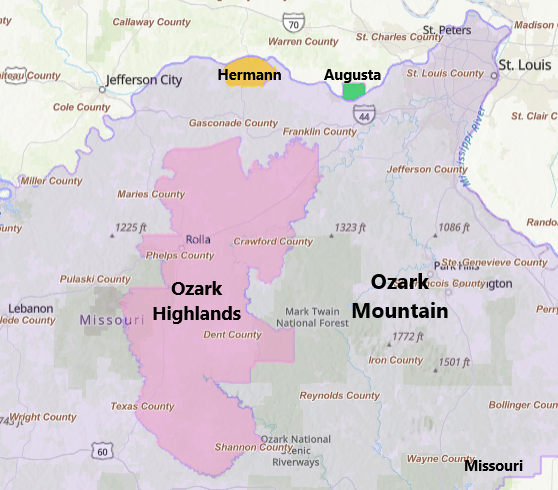
- Type: American Viticultural Area
- Year established: 1987
- Years of wine industry: 128
- Part of: Missouri, Ozark Mountain AVA
- Other regions in Missouri, Ozark Mountain AVA: Hermann AVA
- Growing season: 182 days
- Climate region: Region III
- Heat units: 3,824 GDD units
- Total area: 1,280,000 acres (2,000 sq mi)
- Size of planted vineyards: 500 acres (200 ha)
- Grapes produced: Chardonel, Chambourcin, Frontenac, Norton, St. Vincent, Traminette, Vidal blanc, Vignoles
- No. of wineries: 8

Ozark Highlands is an American Viticultural Area (AVA) located in southern Missouri in the Ozark Mountains just east of Jefferson City extending north to the Eleven Point River and south through portions of Phelps, Maries, Osage, Gasconade, Franklin, Crawford, Shannon, Dent, Texas, Reynolds, and Pulaski counties and adjacent to the western boundaries of the Mark Twain National Forest and Ozark National Scenic Riverways. It was established as the nation's 94^{th} and the state's fourth wine appellation on August 31, 1987 by the Bureau of Alcohol, Tobacco and Firearms (ATF), Treasury after reviewing the petition submitted by Mr. Laurence R. Carver of the Carver Wine Cellar on behalf of the Ozark Highland Vintners, an association of seven Missouri wineries including Carver Wine Cellar, proposing a viticultural area to be known as "Ozark Highlands."

The 1.28 million acres (2,000 sq mi) wine appellation expands across the northernmost hills of the Ozark Plateau surrounding the towns of Rolla and Dillon. At the outset, many of the 500 acres (200 ha) under vine are located on south-facing slopes with an additional 500 acres (200 ha) devoted to table grapes. The AVA is a sub-appellation within the vast, multi-state Ozark Mountain AVA. Its climate is drier than other parts of the state, but the soil of sandy loam and clay retains moisture well. The first grapevines in the Ozark Highlands were planted in the 1890s by Italian immigrants in the Rosati area. All grape varieties are grown in the area, including Vitis vinifera, Vitis labrusca and French hybrids.

== Name ==
The name "Ozark Highlands" has been used synonymously with "Ozark Mountains" to refer to the entire Ozark region, encompassing most of southern Missouri and northern Arkansas. Examples of this usage can be seen in The Geography of the Ozark Highland of Missouri by Carl O. Sauer (1920) and Early History of the Northern Ozarks by Gerard Schultz, M.A.(1937). These works became the definitive source on the complex topography of the Ozark Region. This is the rationale for Sauer"s selection of "Ozark Highlands" as an appellation:

The term “mountains" is the oldest, and is most employed in the very rugged Arkansas portion, where the name Ozark" also originated. It is not appropriate to the Missouri part of the Ozarks, has never been in common use there, and is resented by the inhabitants. The term "plateau" properly describes only the western third and is so limited in local usage. For the remainder of the area it is correct only in a technical physiographic sense, and misleading otherwise. For certain large but discontinuous tracts the name "hills" is appropriately used. "Dome" and "uplift" are geologic, not geographic expressions. The name best suited, because not too specific is "highland." It is applicable to the mountain plateau and hill sections, as well as to the gently sloping boarder areas.

The Ozark Highland has three distinguishing characteristics of surface: (1) elevation generally higher than that of the surrounding regions; (2) greater relief; and (3) general accordance of summit levels.

Following Sauer, in 1937, Gerard Schultz, M.A., in his Early History of the Northern Ozark frequently and regularly used the term "Ozark Highlands" in discussing the geography of the northern Ozarks. More recently, this common designation specifically referred to that portion of the northern Ozarks lying in the Missouri border and clearly labeled as such in a recently published scholarly map.

In recent years, however, the name "Ozark Highlands" has developed an additional meaning. Due to the efforts of the Ozark Highland Vintners, this name has come to refer specifically to the more limited area being established as a viticultural area by this Treasury decision. To demonstrate the prevalence of this narrower meaning, the petitioner submitted more than a dozen newspaper clippings and magazine articles relating to wine production in the "Ozark Highlands" area. In each instance, the name "Ozark Highlands" refers to the viticultural area established by this Treasury decision, not to the entire Ozark region.

== History ==
The Hermann area in the northern Ozarks was founded in 1836 by settlers from the German Settlement Society. Pioneer leader George Bayer selected a location along the banks of the Missouri River for its similarities to the Rheingau region that many of the settlers came from. The area was named Hermann after Arminius of Germania, a chieftain of the Germanic Cherusci tribe, who defeated three Roman legions in the Battle of the Teutoburg Forest in 9 AD. This "Second Fatherland" was intended for German immigrants to be a self-supporting refuge for their heritage and traditions. The settlers established a joint-stock company and advertised widely throughout the United States and Germany, seeking farmers, laborers, winemakers and artisans to establish what they called a "German Athens of the West."

Grapes also were grown by Italian immigrants who settled into two widely separated Ozark communities. Both settlements, Tontitown in Washington County, Arkansas, and Rosati, Missouri in eastern Phelps County, Missouri, were colonized in 1898 under the leadership of an Italian-born priest. The members of these colonies were fleeing from an ill-fated philanthropic colonization venture in southeastern Arkansas, where malaria had decimated their ranks. One reason for selecting the Ozarks locations was their suitability for growing grapes. Then, too, the Ozarks reminded them of their homeland in Italy, and the region was free of malaria.
Prohibition in the United States completely wiped out the commercial wine industry in the Ozarks, however, the Rosati Winery became a grape processing station for the Welch Grape Juice Company avoiding closure. After the Repeal of Prohibition in 1933, commercial winemaking was revived and Rosati Winery opened. Today, there is around 500 acres (200 ha) under vine and the Meramec River Wine Trail is the primer enotourism guide of the Ozark Highlands.

== Terroir ==
=== Topography ===
Geographically, the "Ozark Highlands" viticultural area constitutes "the region formed by the undissected northern uplands of the Ozark plateau." This region has several distinguishing geographical features, the most striking of which is its topography. Landforms in the Ozark Highlands appellation fall into three types: cedar forest, rolling native prairie, or stream bottoms. The viticultural area consists of an elevated plateau, which is surrounded by highly dissected river and stream valleys. Relative to surrounding areas, therefore, the "Ozark Highlands" are flat. They are also higher in elevation than their immediate surroundings. One effect of this topography on the viticulture of the area has been described by the petitioner as follows: "The higher elevations are often in the form of flat to rolling 'ridge tops' producing prominent and completely unshaded hilltops that are excellent sites for vineyards." To demonstrate this topographical distinction, the petitioner submitted a map titled "Topography of Missouri," prepared in 1978 by the Geology and Land Survey of the Missouri Department of Natural Resources. This map shows the "Ozark Highlands" area to be "Isolated Rolling Plains," which are surrounded by "Highly Dissected Plateaus." The topographical distinction is also apparent by examination of contour lines of the U.S.G.S. maps on which the area appears.

=== Soil ===
The "Ozark Highlands" can also be distinguished from surrounding areas by soil. In support of this distinction, the petitioner submitted a publication of the U.S. Department of Agriculture's Soil Conservation Service, entitled Missouri General Soil Map. This publication shows that the soils of the Lebanon-Hobson-Clarksville series are especially distinctive of the area. This soil series occurs extensively within the area, but is found in only a few isolated spots outside of it. Other soils in the area include the Gerald-Union-Goss series and the Hobson-Coulstone-Clarksville series. The latter series occurs to a limited extent within the area, but immediately outside of the area, it becomes predominant. Distinctive soil patterns often reflect distinctive underlying geologic structures. That this is so in the "Ozark Highlands" is demonstrated by a map called "Geologic Map of Missouri," published in 1979 by the Missouri Geological Society. The petition shows that the soil of the viticultural area is predominantly derived from the Roubidoux Formation, with some Smithville Formation and Pennsylvanian Undifferentiated. That pattern contrasts with the Gasconade Dolomite soil in many of the immediately surrounding areas.

=== Climate ===
The "Ozark Highlands" are also distinguished from surrounding areas on the basis of climate. These upper portions are relatively frost-free for longer periods of the year. The cooler frost-causing air in the Spring and Fall of the year flows down the hillsides from the higher to the lower elevations, especially into the deeply trenched river valleys. This leaves the Ozark Highlands relatively frost free as compared to the lower elevations. The USDA plant hardiness zones range from 6a to 7a.

== Viticulture ==
The majority of Ozark Highlands vineyards and wineries located on the Ozark Plateau are on average at the elevation of 1,050 feet (320 m). A wide variety of grapes grown include the Vitis vinifera Riesling and Cabernet Sauvignon, the Vitis labrusca Concord and Catawba, the Vitis aestivalis variety Norton (Cynthiana), and several hybrid varieties, Chambourcin, Seyval blanc, St. Vincent, Steuben, Traminette, Vidal blanc, Vignoles, Chardonel, Cayuga, Edelweiss and De Chaunac. The region also produces a wide variety of wine styles ranging from sweet late harvest dessert wines and fortified wines, including port-style and solera made sherry-style wines to drier still red, white and rosés. Many fruit wines are also produced, usually from cherry, strawberry or raspberries.

== See also ==
- St. James Winery
- Rosati Family Winery
