= Missouri wine =

Wine made from grapes grown in Missouri, United States

Missouri
- Wine region
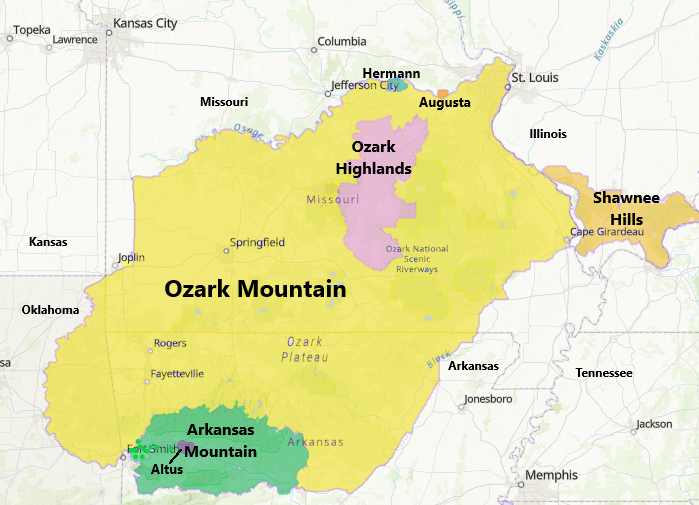
- Missouri AVAs
- Official name: State of Missouri
- Type: U.S. State Appellation
- Year established: 1821
- Years of wine industry: 189
- Country: United States
- Sub-regions: Augusta AVA, Hermann AVA, Ozark Highlands AVA, Ozark Mountain AVA, Loess Hills District
- Climate region: Continental/humid subtropical
- Total area: 68,742 square miles (43,994,880 acres)
- Size of planted vineyards: 200 acres (81 ha)
- No. of vineyards: 400
- Grapes produced: Baco noir, Cabernet Franc, Cabernet Sauvignon, Catawba, Cayuga, Chambourcin, Chardonel, Chardonnay, Chelois, Concord, Couderc noir, De Chaunac, Delaware, Diamond, Edelweiss, Malbec, Marechal Foch, Merlot, Muscat Canelli, New York Muscat, Norton, Rayon d'Or, Riesling, Rougeon, Ruby Cabernet, Seyval blanc, St. Vincent, Touriga Francesa, Traminette, Valiant, Valvin muscat, Vidal blanc, Vignoles, Villard blanc, Villard noir, Vivant, Zinfandel
- No. of wineries: 134
- Wine produced: 971,031 gallons

Missouri wine is wine made from grapes grown in the U.S. state appellation of Missouri. In the early-to-mid-19th century, German immigrants founded the regional wine industry resulting in the wine corridor being called the "Missouri Rhineland". Later, Italian immigrants also contributed to the state's wine production. In the mid-1880s, wine was produced by volume in Missouri more than in any other state and just before Prohibition, Missouri was the nation's second-largest wine-producing state and had the nation's first American Viticultural Area (AVA) established on June 20, 1980 named Augusta. In 2017 there were 125 wineries operating in the state of Missouri, up from 92 in 2009. As of 2026, there are five AVAs in Missouri.

== History ==
German immigrants in the Missouri River Valley established vineyards and wineries on both sides of the river. Hermann, Missouri, settled by Germans in 1837, had ideal conditions to grow grapes for wine. By 1848 winemakers there produced 10,000 US gallons (37,900 L) per year, expanding to 100,000 US gallons (378,500 L) per year by 1856. Overall, the state produced 2,000,000 US gallons (7,570,800 L) per year by the 1880s, the most of any state in the nation. Stone Hill Winery in Hermann became the second largest in the nation (and the third-largest in the world), shipping a million barrels of wine by the turn of the 20th century. Its wines won awards at world's fairs in Vienna in 1873 and the 1876 Centennial Exposition in Philadelphia.

In the mid-19th century, the phylloxera louse destroyed much of the Vitis vinifera grape crop in Europe, especially France, after a Frenchman transferred American wine grapes carrying phylloxera to France. Missouri's state entomologist, Charles Riley, found that American rootstocks were resistant to the pest. He directed selling millions of rootstocks to vineyards around the world, to which their grape varieties could be grafted. This saved the French wine industry as well as others. The city of Montpellier erected statues honoring these events, as well as Riley's scientific colleague, Jules Émile Planchon.

Before Prohibition, Missouri was the second-largest wine-producing state in the nation. The new amendment forced the shutdown or abandonment of all wineries except that at St. Stanislaus Seminary, in Florissant, which was permitted to make sacramental wines. The wine industry was destroyed for decades.

Revival of the state's wine industry started in 1965 with the reopening of Stone Hill Winery (originally established in 1847) in Hermann by Jim and Betty Held, followed soon by the opening of Mount Pleasant Winery in Augusta on the north side of the river. By 1974, Jim Dierberg was restoring the Hermannhof Winery, which had originally been opened in 1855.

The region received the first certification issued by the Bureau of Alcohol, Tobacco and Firearms (ATF), Treasury as a distinct American Viticultural Area in 1972. The certification recognizes an area's terroir, the topography, soil, climate and other unique characteristics that grow grapes to produce unique wines. A distinct area was recognized on the north side of the Missouri River in southwestern St. Charles County when Augusta AVA was established in 1980. The Hermann AVA, on the south side of the river located in Gasconade County, was established in 1983.

Italians immigrants introduced wine production in the Rolla, Missouri area. This is now within the Ozark Highlands AVA, designated in 1987 and including parts of several counties, from southern Gasconade County to Texas and Dent Counties further south.

The three smaller AVAs are sub-appellations within the Ozark Mountain AVA encompass southern Missouri below the Missouri River, northwestern Arkansas, and northeastern Oklahoma.

== Grapes varieties ==
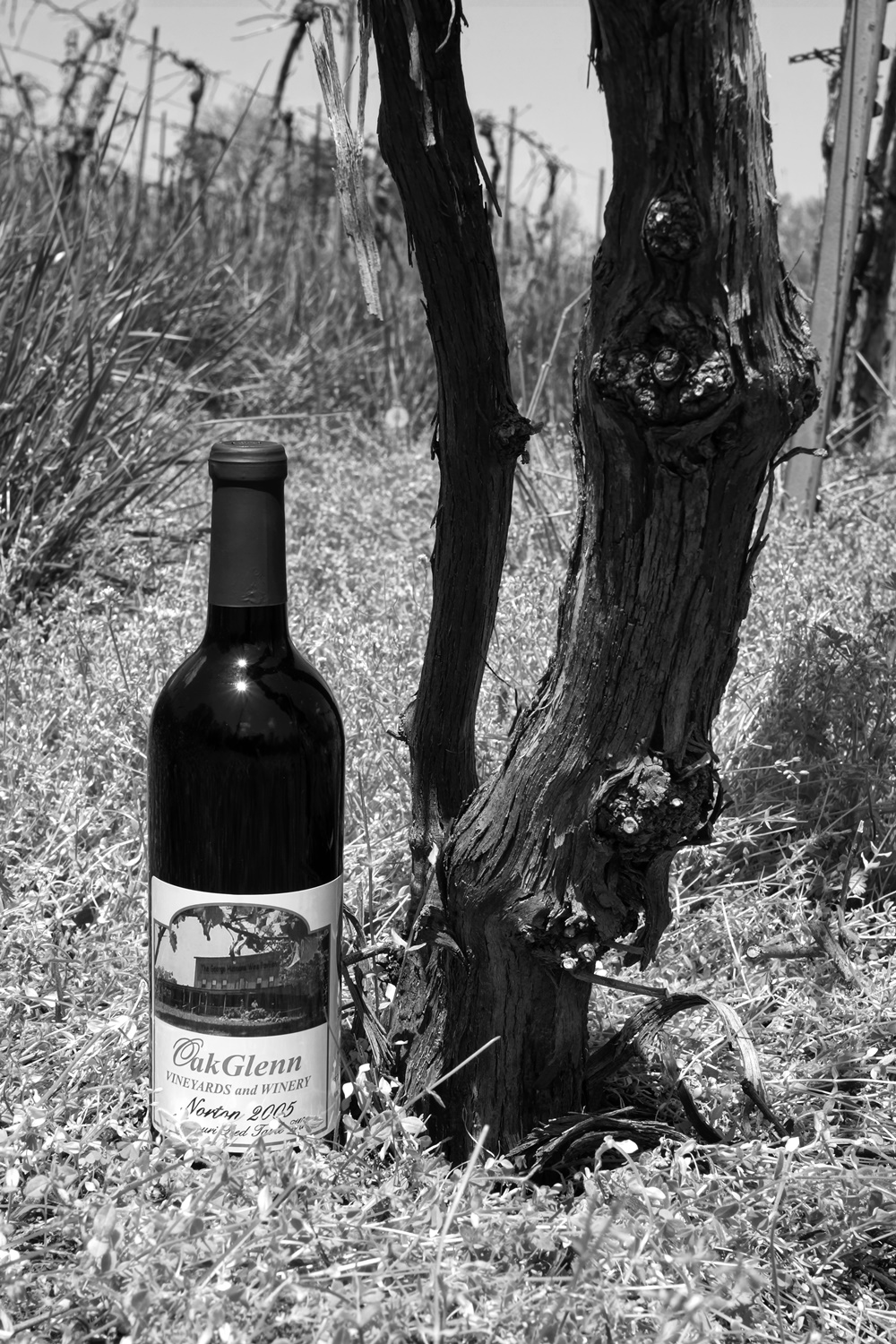
A bottle of Norton wine sits next to what is believed to be a 170-year-old Norton/Cynthiana grapevine cultivated by American winemaker George Hussman the original owner of the property. The vines are now part of OakGlenn Winery's vineyard located in Hermann.

Missouri's climate, with its long, hot summers, good sun exposure, and thin rocky Ozarks soil, is excellent for growing grapes. The moderate average temperature allows natural cellaring of wine.

The most prominent Missouri-grown variety is Cynthiana/Norton, believed to be a variety of Vitis aestivalis. Other varieties grown include native American grapes, Concord and Catawba, as well as French-American hybrids such as Vignoles, Seyval, and Chambourcin. Recently, there has been more interest in planting Vitis vinifera grapes varieties, especially the fine European grapes: Cabernet Franc, Chardonnay, Petit Verdot and Mourvedre.

== Industry ==
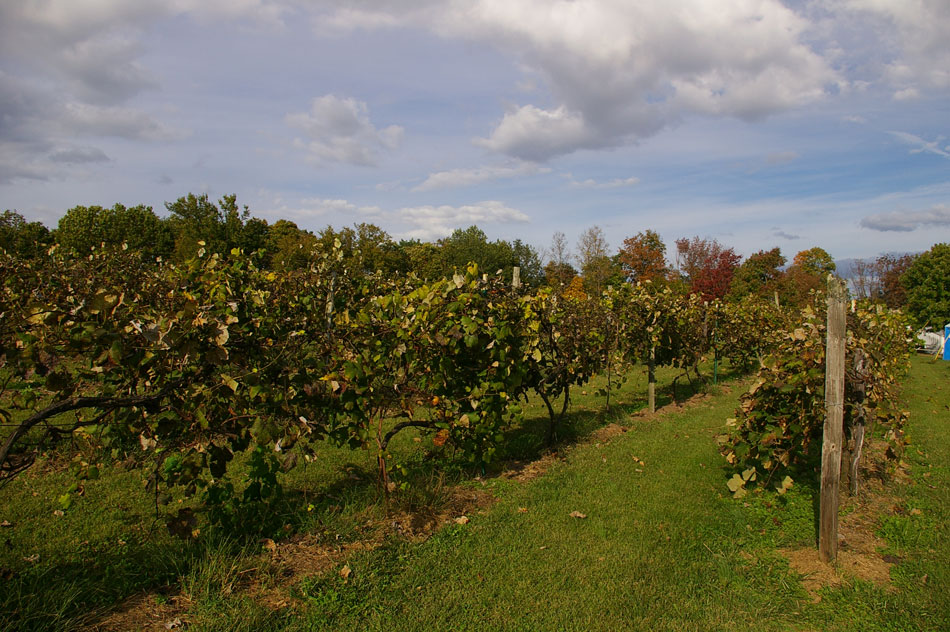
Vineyards in Hermann, Missouri.

The wine industry in Missouri is growing rapidly. Missouri has more than 1,600 acres (6.5 km^{2}) planted in grapes. In 2008 over 888,000 gallons of Missouri wine was sold. The market share of Missouri wine within the state was 7.95% in 2008. The wine industry in Missouri has consistently grown for over a decade, in 2009 97 wineries were producing select Missouri wines. These were supported by over 400 local vineyards. Missouri's winery count was over 126 by 2016. Many of these are small "mom and pop" wineries that have become favorite day-trip sites for many. The four largest wineries in Missouri are (in order): St. James Winery, Stone Hill Winery, Les Bourgeois Winery, and Meramec Vineyards Winery. Missouri is home to five wine trails which host wine events and festivals year round and encourage weekend getaways to some of the established wine regions in the state.

A state tax on wine imposed in 1984, now 12 cents per gallon, supports the state Missouri Wine and Grape Program, which provides scientific and marketing support for Missouri wines. The state hired a viticulturalist to assist in restoring the wine industry. Missouri State University's fruit experiment station began working with winemakers to determine grape varieties suitable for Missouri's climate. The state government hopes to encourage the local wine industry by promoting Missouri regionalism: integrating grape agriculture with winemaking, the restaurant business, and tourism.

Missouri State University's Mountain Grove Cellars, part of the Missouri State University - Mountain Grove Campus Fruit Experimentation Station - is a wholly university-owned and operated wine grape producing vineyard.

The University of Missouri's Grape and Wine Institute (GWI) researches best winemaking and grape growing practices and how they impact the growth of the wine industry in Missouri and the Midwest. The University of Missouri has had some interest in developing a grape-growing education program. Many of the grape growers and winemakers received some instruction from California universities to supplement their studies.

== See also ==
- Missouri Rhineland
- List of wineries in Missouri
