= Mount Pleasant Winery =

American winery in Augusta, Missouri

Coordinates: 38°34′15.22″N 90°53′09.33″W

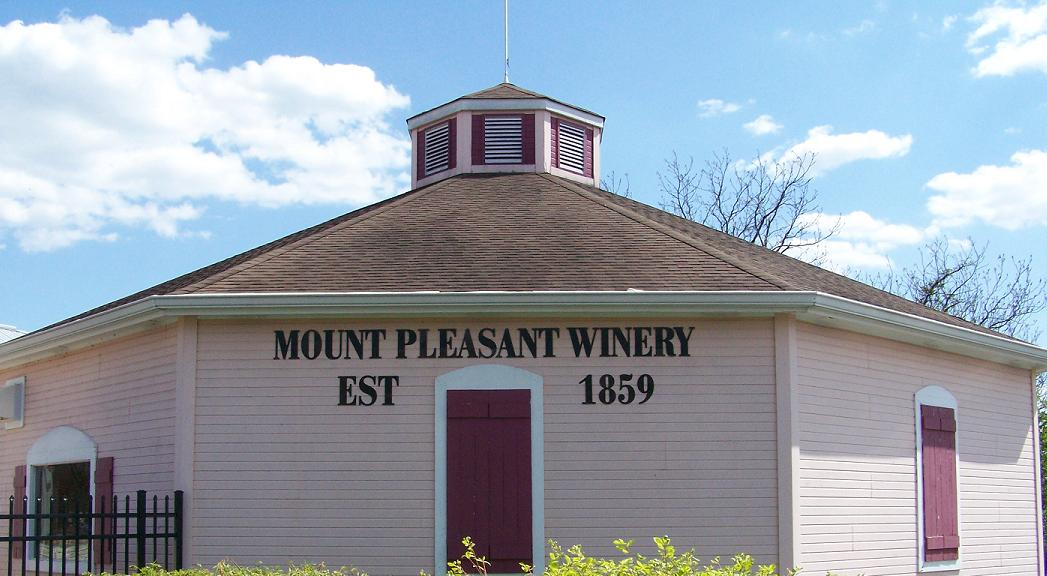
- Location: Augusta, Missouri, United States
- Appellation: Augusta AVA
- Founded: 1859
- Key people: George Muench (founder), Frederick Muench (founder),
- Varietals: Cabernet Sauvignon, Norton, Chardonnay, Merlot, Pinot noir, Vignoles
- Distribution: Regional, limited national and international
- Tasting: Open to public
- Website: mountpleasant.com

Mount Pleasant Estates is a winery in Augusta, Missouri, United States, located on the northern bank of the Missouri River referred as the Missouri Rhineland.

== History ==
Mount Pleasant Winery was founded in 1859 by German immigrants Georg Muench (1801–1879), a younger brother of Friedrich Münch. The Muench brothers chose this area because it reminded them of their former home in Nieder-Gemünden, Upper Hesse, Germany. The winery had to close in 1920 because of Prohibition.

It was reopened for production in 1968, as the second winery in the state to open in the modern era. All wines are produced and bottled at the estate. In 1980, the Augusta AVA was the first American Viticultural Area (AVA) established by the federal government. The winery is situated on a south-facing bluff overlooking the Missouri River Valley. It has 85 acres (34 ha) under vine growing 16 varieties of grapes. The winery has constructed a public wine garden and terraces.

In 1991, the owners were fined by the State of Missouri for allegedly importing an excessive amount of grape juice for inclusion in their wines. The owners appealed the fine to the court, which agreed with the owners' contention that the importations were not in violation of the law, and rescinded the fine.

The following year, the winery's owners, Lucian and Eva Dressel, were divorced, and as a result the winery was sold at auction. The winery stayed in the Dressel family, as the winning bid of $660,000 was made by Lucian Dressel's brother, Phillip, who announced that Lucian would continue to manage the winery. P. Charles Dressel became the majority owner of Mount Pleasant Winery in 2004.

Today, Mount Pleasant is the oldest winery in Augusta. The winery grows 12 grape varieties on 85 acres (34 ha). Over the past two decades, Mount Pleasant has won several awards and achieved high point-ratings for its wine.

== Products and awards ==
The winery produces a variety of red and white table wines, with semi-dry, dry, and sweet styles. It also produces fortified wine (using the "port wine" designation) and sparkling wine. Grape varieties include Cabernet Sauvignon, Chardonnay, Chambourcin, St. Vincent, Vidal Blanc, Rayon d'Or, Merlot, Vignoles, and Norton.

Mount Pleasant Estates has won international awards for its wines. Its highest rating in Wine Enthusiast magazine was 92 points for its 1994 Belle Yvonne Bordeaux Blend.

Mount Pleasant has also been recognized for its practice of sustainable viticulture, an integrated system of wine grape growing that is economically viable, socially supportive, and ecologically sound.

== Branson location ==
Mount Pleasant Winery opened a second winery in the city of Branson, Missouri on April 11, 2008. Mount Pleasant Winery's 9,200-square-foot (850 m^{2}) facility in Branson is located on two acres (87,000 sq ft) property on Green Mountain Drive. Mount Pleasant built the Branson location with a focus on sustainable practices. The building runs on hydro-electric power and the structure is built partially into the ground to reduce energy consumption.

== See also ==
- Friedrich Münch
- List of wineries in Missouri
- Missouri wine
