= Les Bourgeois Winery =

- Location: Columbia, Missouri, USA
- Coordinates: 38°58′16″N 92°32′59″W
- Appellation: Missouri Rhineland
- Founded: 1985
- Known for: Concord, Riverboat Red, Riverboat White, Pink Fox, Solay, LaBelle, Premium Claret, Jeunette Rouge, Fleur Du Vin, Port, LBV Brut Sparkling Wine
- Distribution: Regional (Missouri, Louisiana, Illinois, Kansas, Iowa, Nebraska, Arkansas)
- Website: www.missouriwine.com

Les Bourgeois Winery and Vineyards, Missouri's third largest winery, is in Rocheport, Missouri in the Columbia Metropolitan Area. The winery produces over 120,000 gallons of wine a year, sold locally as well as distributed through the Midwest. Properties owned by the company include a 35-acre (140,000 m^{2}) resort area with vineyards, a restaurant, an A-frame and casual picnic/outdoor wine garden atop the Manitou Bluffs overlooking the Missouri River, and a 34,000-square-foot (3,200 m^{2}) production facility.

== See also ==
- List of wineries in Missouri
- Missouri wine
- Missouri Rhineland
- Norton (grape)
