= St. James Winery =

Winery located in St. James, Missouri

- Location: St. James, Phelps County, Missouri
- Coordinates: 38.0094°N 91.6093°W
- Appellation: Ozark Highlands AVA
- Founded: 1970
- Key people: Founders:Jim and Pat Hofherr; CEO: Peter Hofherr; Winemaker: Aaron Spohr; VP Sales: Dean Chalem; Marketing: Brandon Hofherr
- Distribution: Limited nationwide to 16 states plus Missouri
- Tasting: Open to public
- Website: stjameswinery.com

St. James Winery is located in St. James, Missouri, near mile marker 195 of Interstate 44. The winery distributes 200,000 cases of wine per year in 19 states. The vineyards are composed of 180 acres (73 ha) of Catawba, Vignoles, Chardonel, Concord, Norton, Chambourcin, Seyval and Rougeon grapes. The winemaking heritage of the area was both started and subsequently influenced by Italian Immigrants in the late 19th century. The company has over 50 employees working in the Cellar, Administration, Tasting Room, Shipping and Vineyard departments. The winery distributes in nine U.S. states, mostly in the Midwestern and Southern portions of the country.

== History ==
The St. James Winery was opened in 1970 by Jim and Pat Hofherr. In its first year of business, the winery produced over 8,000 US gallons (30,000 L) of wine or roughly 3,400 cases. Included was two of their wine types, Velvet Red and Velvet White. All four of the Hofherr children worked alongside their mother and father, helping to establish and grow the business.

The Hofherr sons, Andrew and John, reclaimed their spots in the family business in the late 1980s. Andrew returned in 1987 to manage the family vineyard after studying viticulture at the University of Arkansas. John spent his time of absence earning his winemaking degree from California State University, Fresno, and spending 5 years working for Jekel Winery in Monterey California. In 1988, John returned as head winemaker. Both of the brothers brought new updated viticulture and winemaking techniques to the winery, increasing quality and production.

After Jim Hofherr's death in 1994, the second generation had taken over the reins of the winery. Another son, Peter, joined the team in 1995 as general manager, with a BS in microbiology and a Master's in Business Administration.

In order to accommodate for the new growth of demand, the company underwent several major vineyard, cellar and warehouse expansions over the course of the late 1990s to early 2000s. Peter Hofherr left the winery yet again to join in the ranks of public service, eventually becoming Director of Agriculture for the state of Missouri. Andrew Meggit joined the winery team as assistant winemaker in 2002, but after John returned to California to pursue his own bottling line business, Andrew became the new head winemaker. Andrew Meggitt left and moved to Florida in 2023 and now Aaron Spohr is head winemaker. Another newcomer, Dean Chalem, started in 2004 as the VP of sales and continues to manage the winery's wholesaler network. In 2007, son Peter Hofherr returned to the family business as CEO of St. James Winery. In 2022, Peter's daughter Brandon Hofherr took over the marketing department as the Marketing Director. She is the first of the 3rd generation to return to the business.

St. James winery is now distributed in most states either through direct shipping to consumers or wholesale. They produce over 250,000 gallons of wine and continue to win awards. They are known for their approachable style and produce everything from sweet wines to fruit wines to dry wines.

== Awards ==
In 2009 the winery was named winery of the year in the eastern United States by the Critics Challenge International Wine Competition.

In 2013, Andrew Meggitt was named 64 in a list of the Top 100 Influential U.S. Winemakers by IntoWine.com

At the Los Angeles International Wine Competition, St. James Winery's Friendship School White was given the honor of Best of Class, as well as a score of 97.
