= Stone Hill Winery =

- Old Stone Hill Historic District
- U.S. National Register of Historic Places
- U.S. Historic district
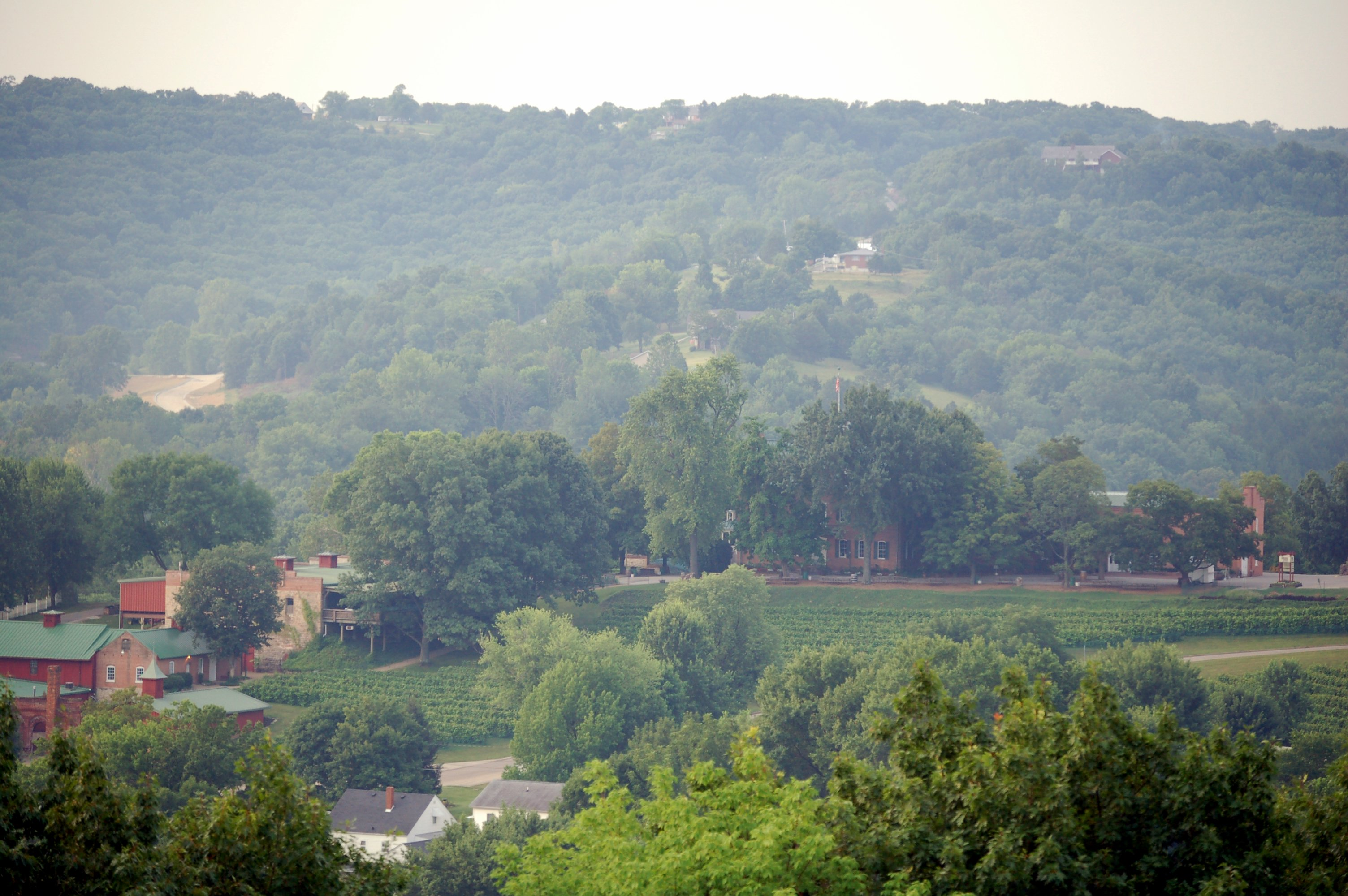
- Stone Hill Winery and vineyards

- Location within Missouri Location within the United States
- Location: Bounded roughly by W. 12th, Goethe and Jefferson Sts., and Iron Rd., Hermann, Missouri
- Coordinates: 38°41′48″N 91°26′45″W
- Area: 7 acres (2.8 ha)
- Built: 1869
- Architectural style: Federal
- NRHP reference No.: 69000102
- Added to NRHP: May 21, 1969

Stone Hill Winery is a Missouri winery located in Hermann, Missouri, along the Missouri River, in what is called the Missouri Rhineland of the Hermann AVA. Established by German immigrants in 1847, it is the largest winery in the state.

== History ==
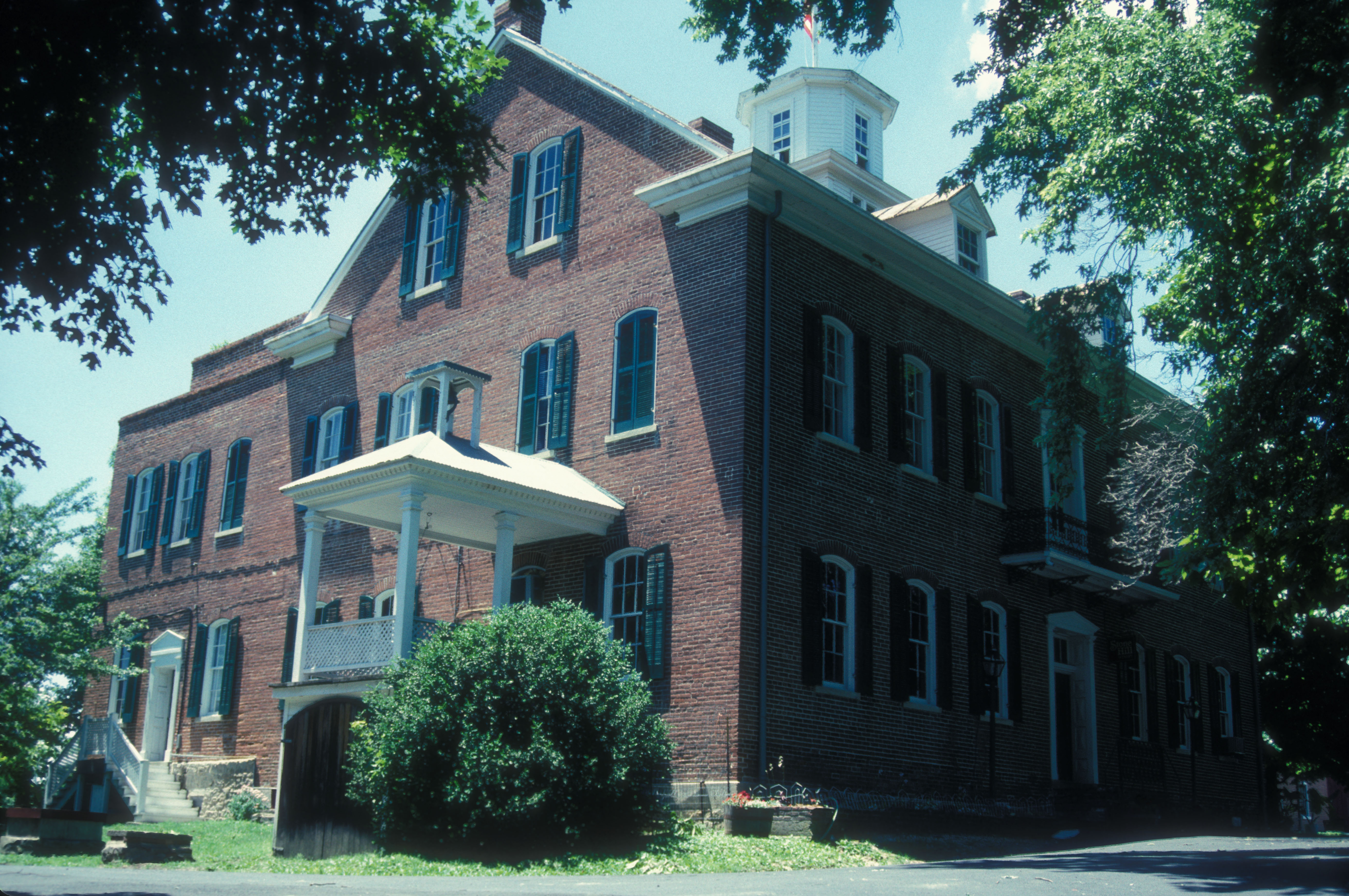
Stone Hill Winery, 2007

A small private winery, built on a hill at the southern boundary of Hermann, was established in 1847 under the name of the founder, Michael Poeschel (1809-1893). From 1861 to 1878, when John Scherer was a partner, the name changed to M. Poeschel and Scherer. Building on the present site began in 1861. The original complex included the shipping cellars built that year and a residence-company office building built in 1869. Poeschel and Scherer sold most of the company in 1878 to their managers, William Herzog and George Stark. In 1883, Herzog and Stark took full ownership of the winery, and changed its name to Stone Hill Wine Company. George Stark, who was born in Germany in 1845 and emigrated to the United States in 1867, became sole proprietor in 1893. Under his management the Stone Hill Wine Company became one of the largest in the country.

Stone Hill Norton wine of 2003

At the turn of the 20th century, Stone Hill Winery was the largest winery west of the Mississippi River in the United States, the second largest winery in the United States, and the third largest winery in the world. It produced 1,250,000 gallons in 1900. Its wine had won numerous awards in international fairs, including Vienna in 1873, Philadelphia in 1876, and St. Louis in 1904. Due to Prohibition, the winery was closed in 1920, along with virtually all others in the nation. During this time, the owners earned money by using its wine cellars to grow mushrooms for sale until 1965.

In 1965 local farmers Jim and Betty Held made Stone Hill Winery the first in Missouri to be re-established. They moved into the remnants of the original winery and began the long restoration of the dis-repaired old-world buildings and vaulted underground cellars.

The Old Stone Hill Historic District was listed on the National Register of Historic Places in 1969. The district encompasses 11 contributing buildings associated with the Stone Hill Winery. They include the combined residence and office for company manager, processing plant, warehouse, barn and stone-lined aging cellars.

== See also ==
- List of wineries in Missouri
