= Missouri Rhineland =

German cultural region in the State of Missouri

Coordinates: 38°36′N 91°00′W

Missouri Rhineland Missouri Rheinland (German)
- Region of Missouri
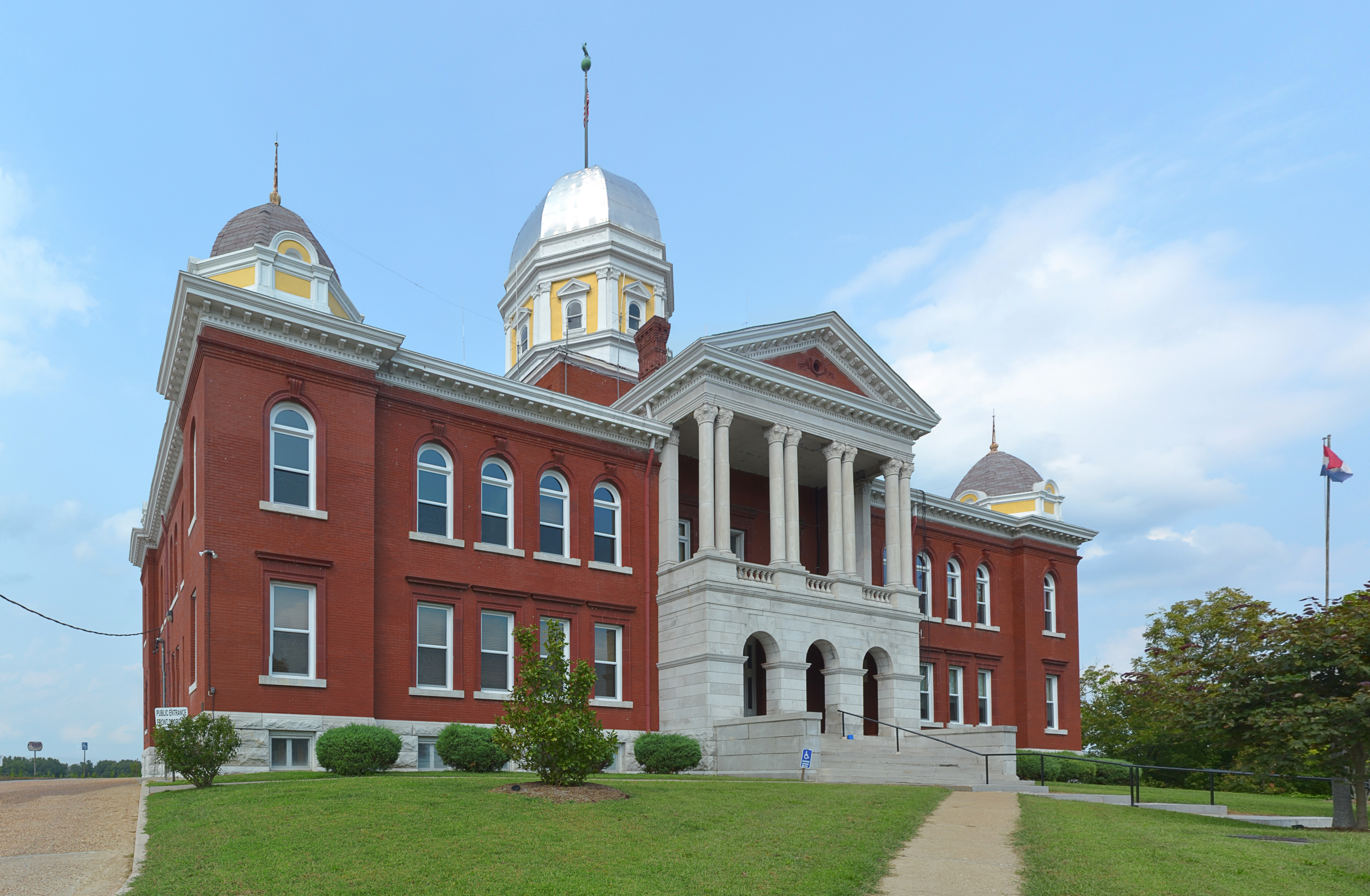
- The Gasconade Courthouse in Hermann, Missouri Rhineland

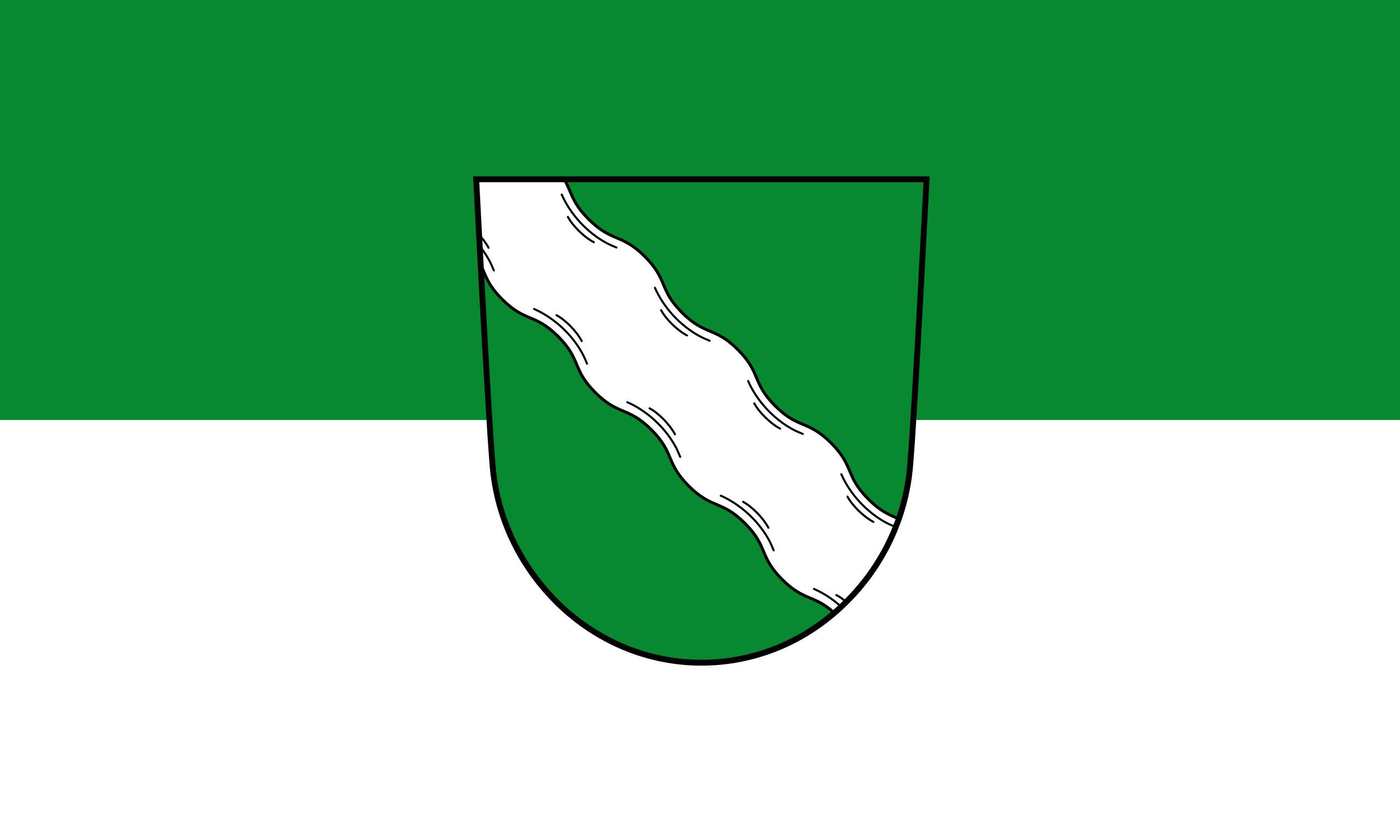
- Flag

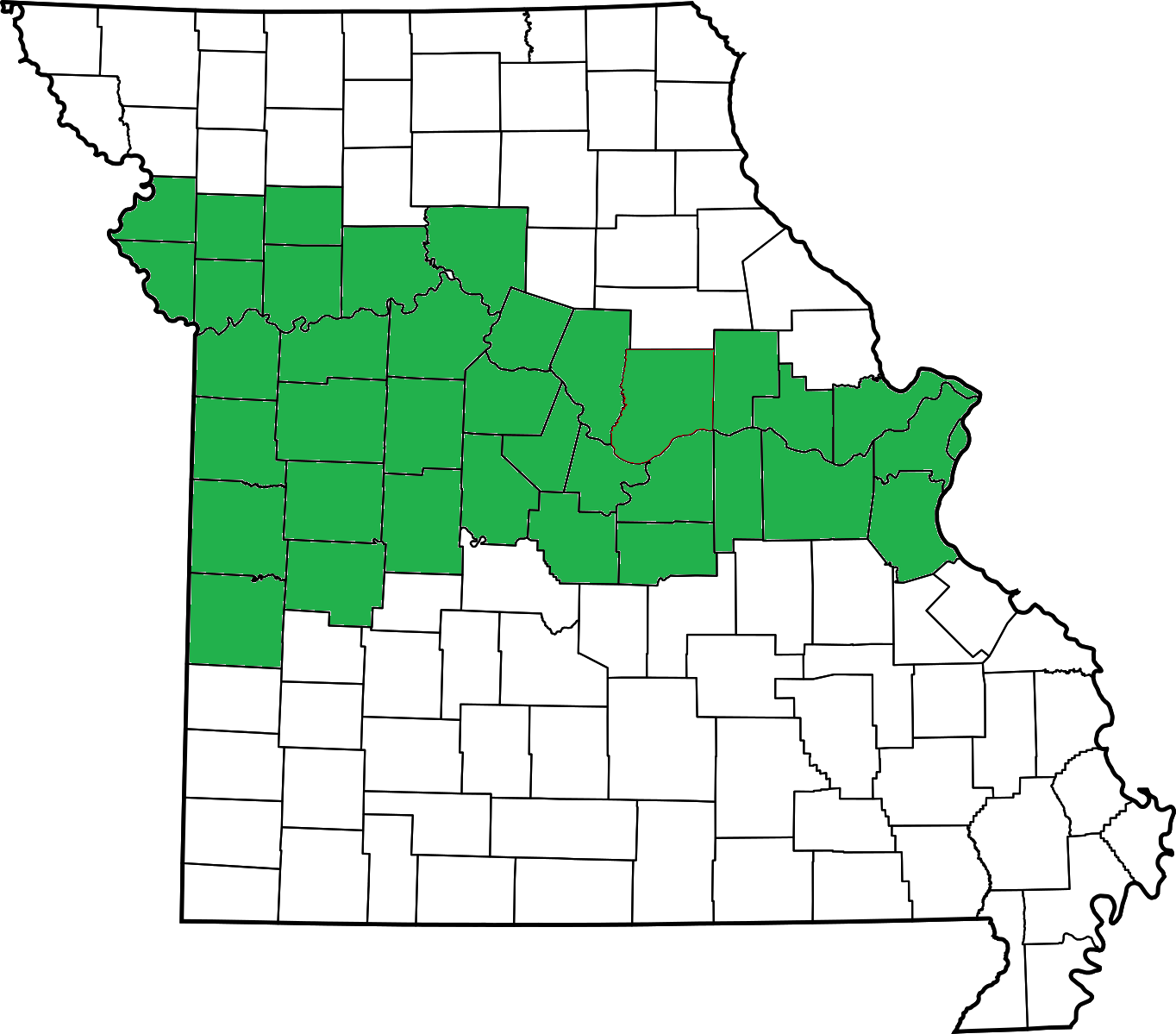
- Map of the Missouri Rhineland
- Country: United States
- State: Missouri
- Demonym(s): Missouri Rhinelanders, (German: Missouri Rheinländer)

The historical Province of Rhineland, (German: Rheinprovinz)

The Missouri Rhineland (German: Missouri Rheinland) is a German American cultural region of Missouri that extends from west of St. Louis to slightly east of Jefferson City, located mostly in the Missouri River Valley on both sides of the river. The region overlaps with Little Dixie, a cultural region of central Missouri originally populated by “Old Stock” settlers from Kentucky, Virginia, and Tennessee. Dutzow, the first permanent German settlement in Missouri, was founded in 1832 by an immigrant from Lübeck, the "Baron" Johann Wilhelm von Bock. The area was named by Rhinelanders who noticed its similarities in soil and topography to the Rhineland region of Europe, a wine-growing area around the Rhine river. Rhinelanders settled the region, along with other Germans; by 1860, nearly half of all settlers in Missouri Rhineland were from Koblenz, capital of the Rhine Province.

The Rhenish Germans resided in the Missouri Rhineland: St. Louis, Kansas City, and the towns Gasconade, Franklin, Lincoln, Montgomery, Osage, Cole, Moniteau, Morgan, Pettis, Benton, Westphalia, Deepwater, and Henry. The German settlers of Hermann, known as "Deutschheim", came from the Rhineland through Philadelphia, Pennsylvania.

In the 1800s, nearly half of all Germans in Missouri Rhineland owned real estate, and were the most employed group in the region, besides the Missouri French; they were artisans, and enjoyed a high success in their trades.

The soils of the Missouri River valley and surrounding areas are mainly rocky residual soils left after the carbonate (mainly limestone) bedrock weathered away to impurities of clayey soil and chert fragments. Farther to the north, glacial deposits and wind-deposited loess, a silty soil also associated with the glaciers, are intermingled with the residual soils.

While the soil could support other crops, the steep slopes of these areas were better used for viticulture. German settlers established the first wineries in the mid-19th century. Italian immigrants later established their own vineyards, especially near Rolla in Phelps County. By 1920, Missouri was the second-largest wine-producing state in the nation. Then came Prohibition, which ruined the industry.

In the 1960s, local winemakers began to rebuild, part of a movement in states across the country. In 1980, an area around Augusta, Missouri, was designated by the federal government as the first American Viticultural Area (AVA), and one around Hermann, Missouri, was designated an AVA in 1983. Much of the region of the Missouri Rhineland from Augusta to Jefferson City along the Missouri River is part of the larger Ozark Mountain AVA.

== History ==
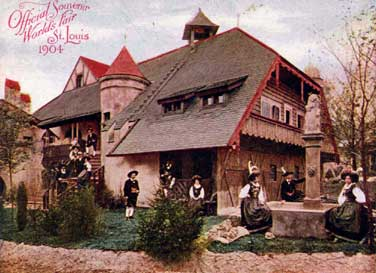
A photo of Missouri Rhinelanders at the 1904 St. Louis World's Fair

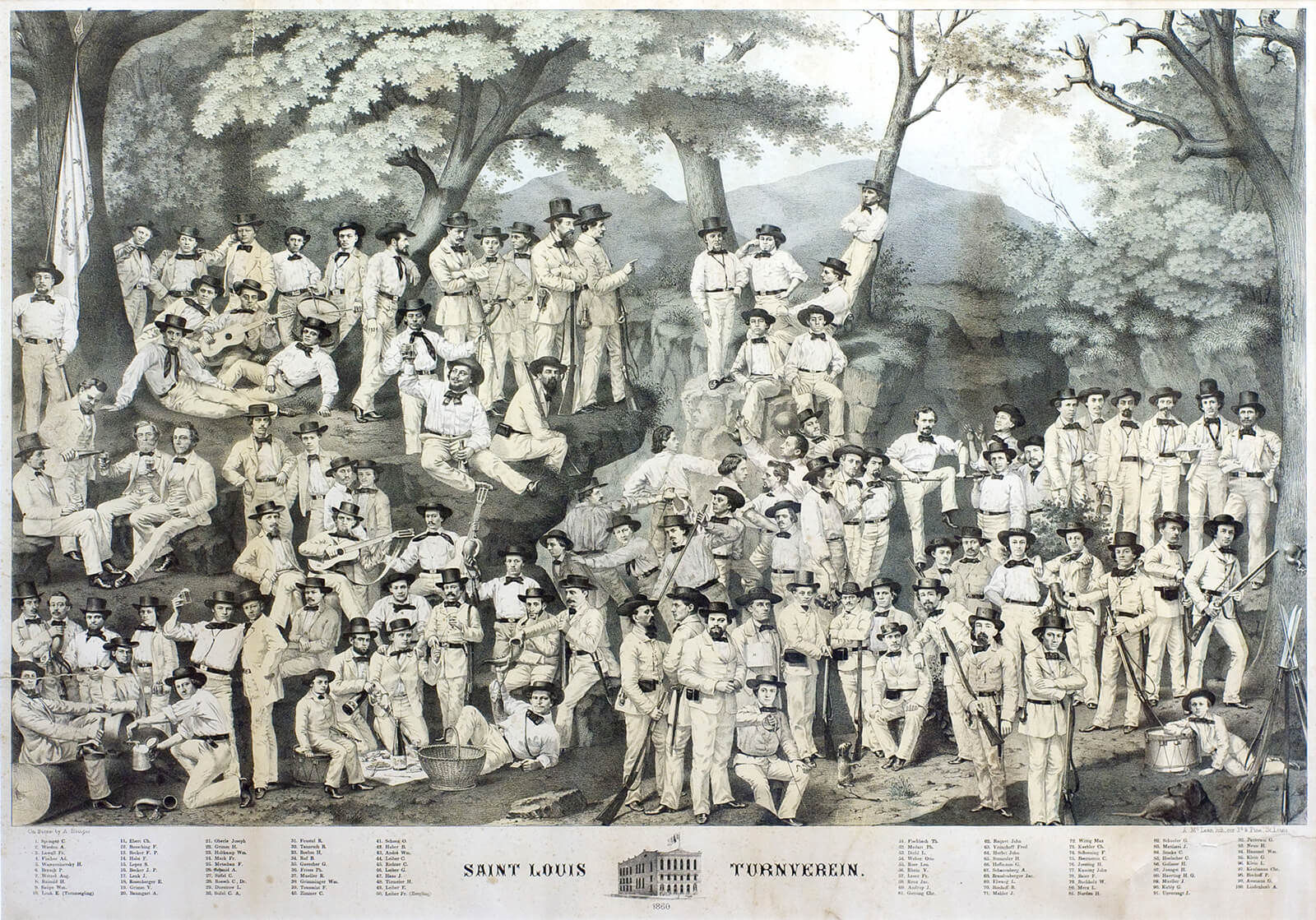
A Missouri Rhineland Turnverein

A German attorney and author named Gottfried Duden purchased land on the north side of the Missouri River along Lake Creek that he first visited in 1824. He was investigating the possibilities of settlement in the area by his countrymen. In 1827 he returned to Rhineland, which he felt was overpopulated. There in 1829 he published Bericht über eine Reise nach den westlichen Staaten Nordamerikas (Journal of a trip to the western states of North America), extolling the Missouri valley as a better Rhineland.

In 1832, members of the small so-called Berlin Society communally purchased land that became the village of Dutzow, founded by Baron von Bock of Mecklenburg, Germany, in March 1834.

Led by Friedrich Muench and Paul Follenius of the Giessen Emigration Society, German immigrants arrived in the area in 1834. Resident Friedrich Muench became known for his expertise in the cultivation of grapes and wine making. Muench was a prominent writer and lecturer and wrote a number of books. He frequently wrote under the name of "Far West". His book American Grape Culture was published in 1859. Also in 1859, Muench's brother George founded Mount Pleasant Winery based upon the principles and advice of Friedrich Muench.

In 1836, the German Settlement Society began to look for a place to build a German community insulated from the increasing diversity of nationalities found in many American settlements. They chose to settle in Hermann, Missouri, and the first settlers arrived in 1837. An early leader of the settlers was George Bayer, who arrived in early 1838. The soil on the hillsides surrounding the settlement was not appropriate for many forms of agriculture, but was ideal for grapes. Hermann's trustees decided to sell tracts of land with the agreement that they be planted as vineyards.

During the American Civil War, Missouri ranked as the top wine-producing state; then slipped to No. 2. In 1920, Missouri had more than 100 wineries. Then came Prohibition, which outlawed the production of most alcoholic beverages. Vineyards were pulled up and used for other purposes or left untended. Winery facilities were converted to serve other purposes or left to decay. Just one winery was allowed to continue operations: Saint Stanislaus Seminary in Florissant, which made sacramental wine.

Significant wine-making in Missouri did not resume until the 1960s and 1970s, when small winemakers began building in many different areas of the United States. In 1965, Stone Hill Winery in Hermann, south of the Missouri River, was the first in the state to be re-established.

In 1980, the Augusta AVA in Augusta was designated the first American Viticultural Area (AVA) in the United States; Hermann AVA in Hermann was designated an AVA three years later. As of 2009, 88 wineries were operating in Missouri.

== The Weinstrasse ==
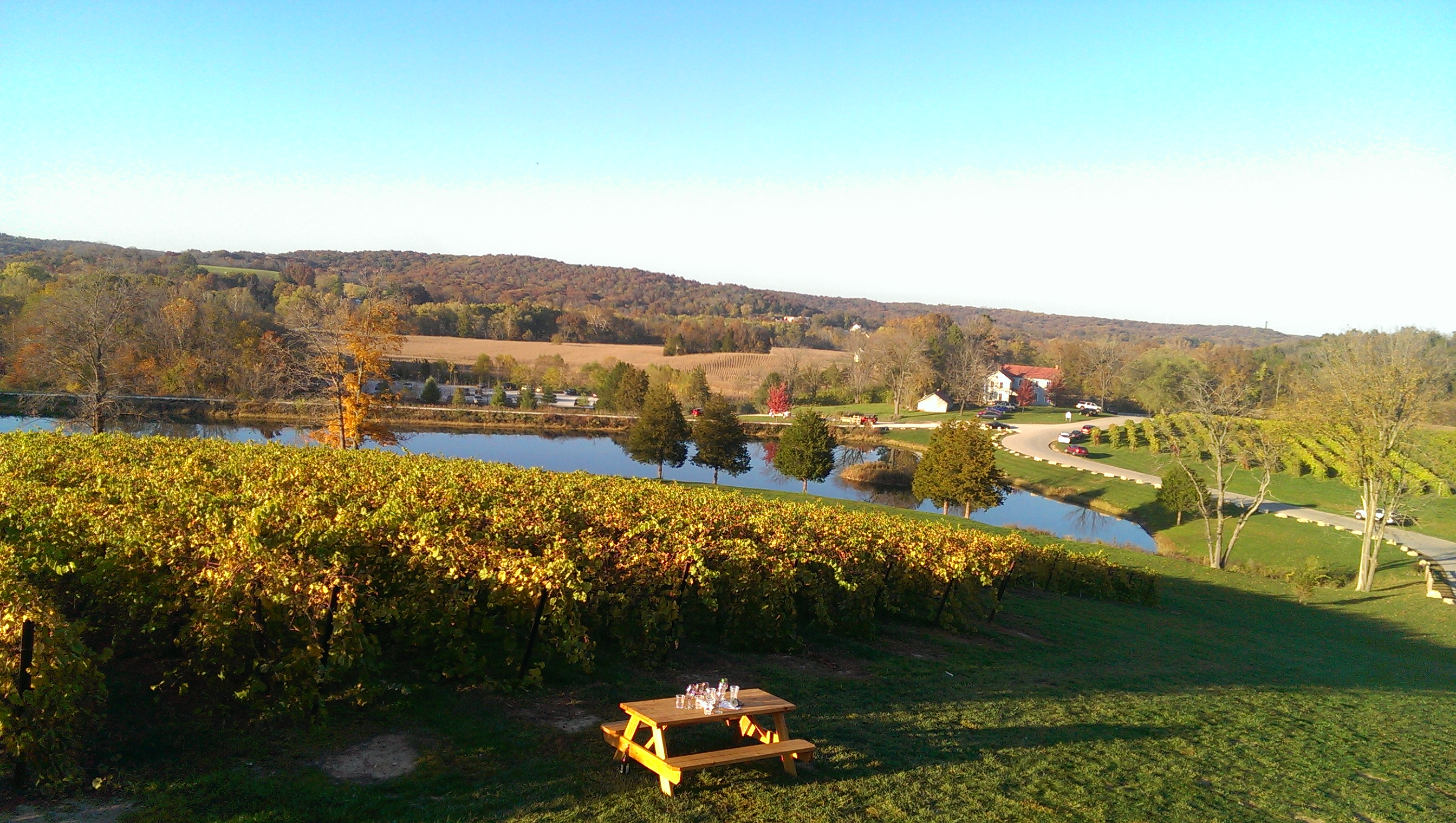
Chandler Hill winery in Defiance

The area along Missouri Route 94 between Defiance and Marthasville has the highest concentration of wineries in the state. Many sit high on south-facing bluffs above the river. The highway, which runs largely parallel to the Katy Trail, has been nicknamed the Missouri Weinstrasse (wine route).

== Missouri German language, Rhenish German ==
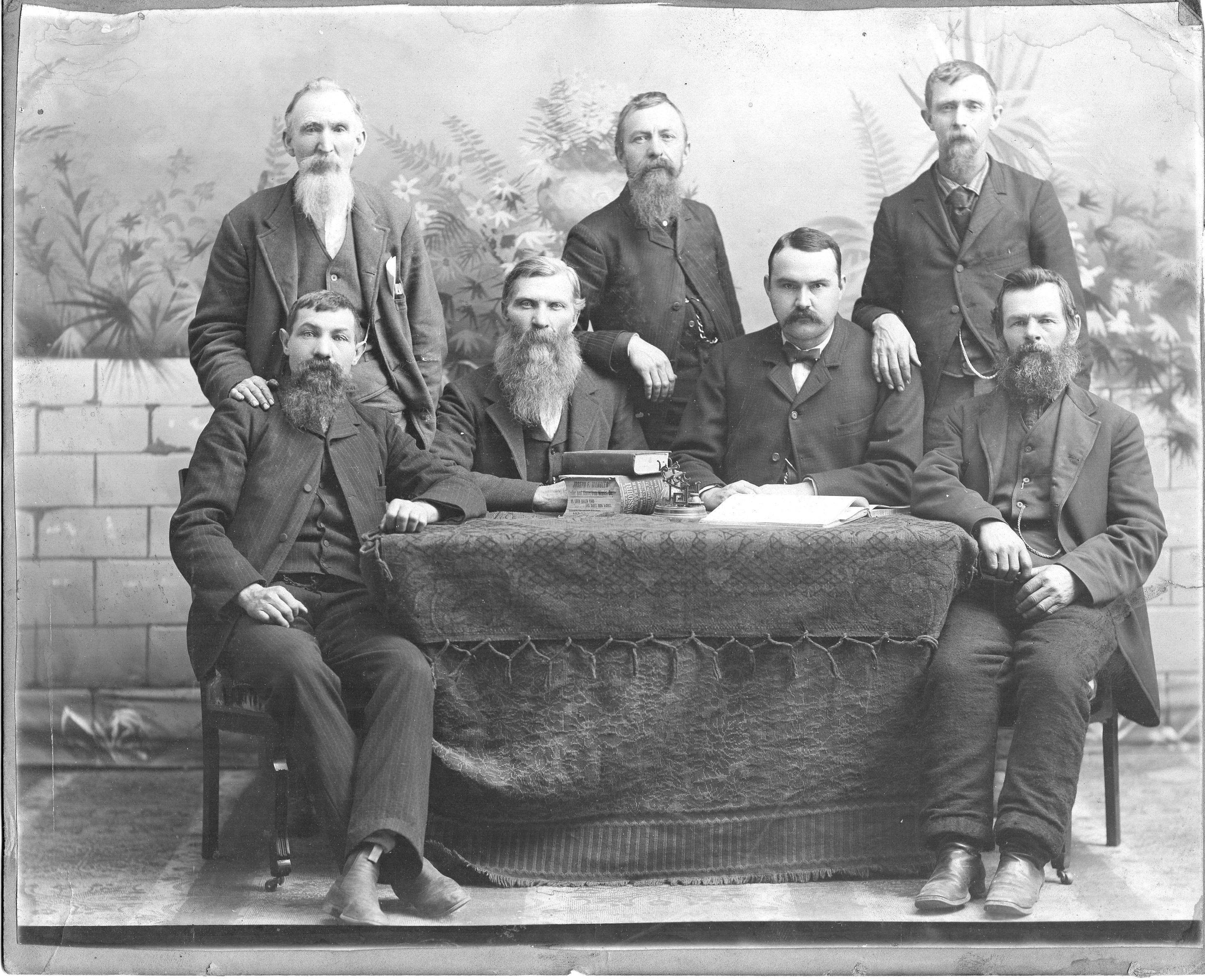
Germans from Hermann in Missouri Rhineland, 1890

In 1837, school teacher George Bayer, a German from Philadelphia, traveled to Missouri and purchased 11,000 acres (4,500 ha) of land along the Missouri River. When the first 17 settlers arrived at what would become Hermann, Missouri, the land terrain was unexpectedly found to be unsuitable for a town. According to local legend and what could serve as a study for anthropological researchers into the ethnic characteristics of the Missouri Rhinelanders (German: Missouri Rheinländer) and other German ethnicities, the survival of this town is credited to German ethnic characteristic of perseverance and hard work.

With the rise of Anti-German sentiment after the start of World War I in 1914, the Federal government banned the German language in Missouri Rhineland schools. The Trading with the Enemy Act of 1917 caused the closure of several Missouri Rhineland German newspapers, such as the Osage County Volksblatt, and the Sedalia Journal. Missouri communities motivated by the war attempted to outlaw German, and campaigned to change street names from "offensive-sounding" German to acceptable American names.

Hermann German is a form of Rhenish German (German: Rheindeutsch), and there are other German settlements and German American farms where German is still spoken to this day.

"Ah... Ich heiße Terry Loehnig und ich war... mein ganzes Leben war ich ein Farmer, und ich bin noch Farmer. Wir haben Rindvieh, Schweine, und ich baue Seubohne und Mais. Wir haben Hähne, En'en [Enten], Truthahn, bisschen von alles - ein Esel. Ja, ich habe 1979 angefangen im Postamt - 1979 und ah, ich konnte deutsch sprechen wie die andere im Postamtplatz. Alli konnten deutsch sprechen, und es hat gut gepasst, dass ich auch deutsch sprechen konnte. Aber diese sind... Alli meine Kameraden, wo an dem Postamt waren sind jetzt tot -- außer einer: Der Carl Ploeger. Er lebt noch. So er ist 89. Alli anderen sind tot.' Hermann German ("Hermanndeutsch") - Missouri German speaker, McKittrick, Missouri, 2014

"Ah... I am called Terry Loehnig and for my whole life I have been a farmer, and I still am a farmer. We have cattle, pigs, and I grow soybeans and corn. We have chickens, ducks, turkeys, a bit of everything - a donkey. Yes, I started in the post office in 1979- 1979 and as well, I could speak German like the others in the post office location. Everyone could speak German, and it was good that I could also speak German. But all of my friends who were in the postoffice are now dead -- except for one: Carl Ploeger. He still is alive. He is 89. All the others are dead. Hermann German ("Hermanndeutsch") - Missouri German speaker, McKittrick, Missouri, 2014

== See also ==
- Alcohol laws of Missouri
- Isidor Bush
- Les Bourgeois Winery
- List of wineries in Missouri
- Missouri wine
