= Manitou Bluffs =

Series of cliffs in Missouri, United States

Coordinates: 38°57′17″N 92°31′59″W

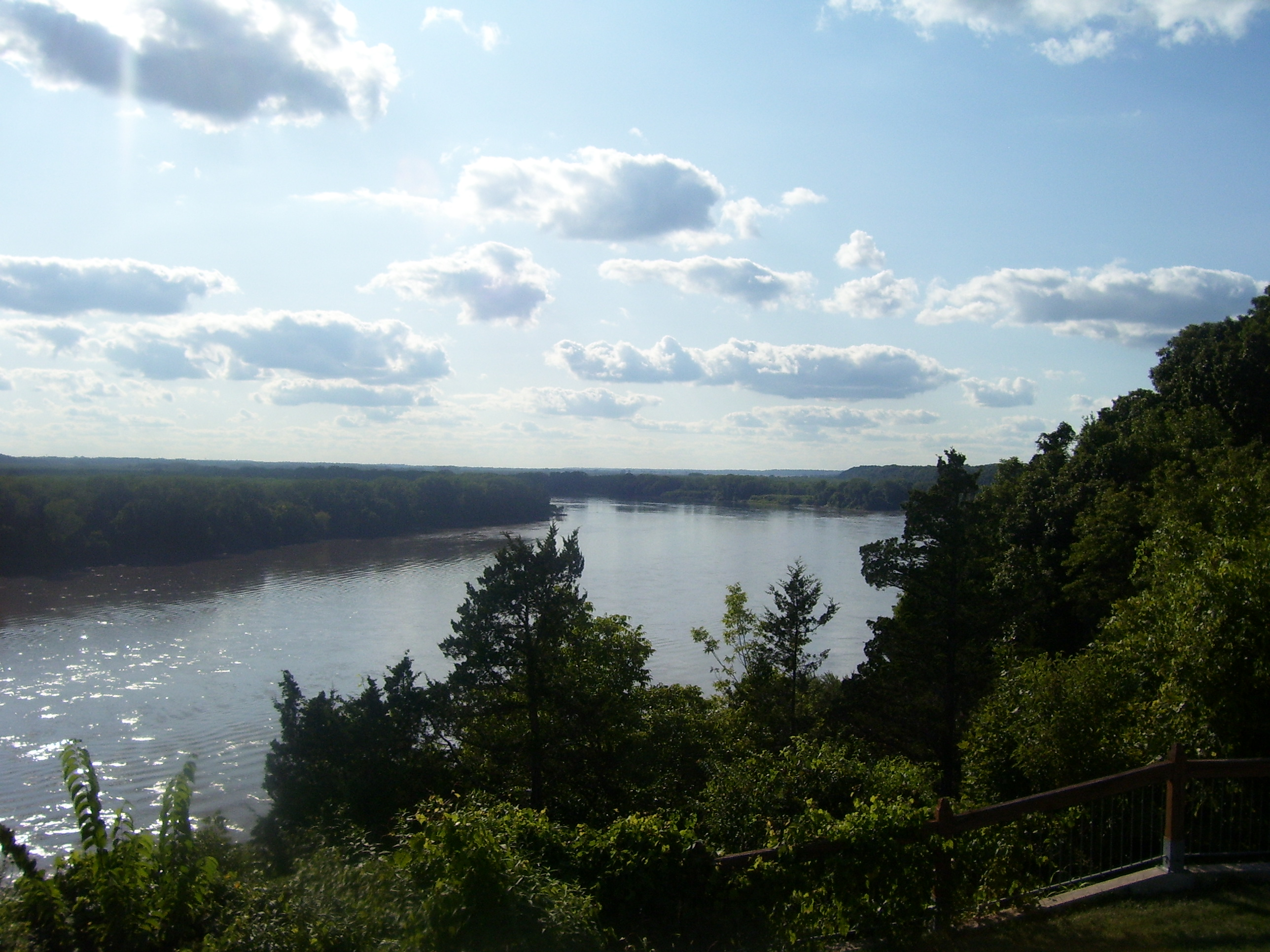
View from the bluffs south of Rocheport

The Manitou Bluffs, or Big Manitou Bluffs, are a series of cliffs and bluffs along the Missouri River in Boone County, Missouri. They are made of Mississippian limestone that has been exposed by the erosive action of the Missouri River over time as it cuts into the Ozark Plateau. The bluffs are located between the towns of Rocheport and Huntsdale. The Katy Trail State Park runs between the bluffs and the river. Interstate 70 crosses the Missouri River on the Rocheport Bridge. Les Bourgeois Winery sits atop the bluffs.

The bluffs are considered sacred by Native Americans, and pictographs are visible on the face of the cliffs near Torbett Spring. There are also many burial mounds atop the bluffs. The Eagle Bluffs Conservation Area and the Overton Bottoms North and Overton Bottoms South units of the Big Muddy National Fish and Wildlife Refuge are nearby.
