= Couderc noir =

Variety of grape

Couderc noir is a red wine hybrid grape that was formerly grown primarily in the South West France wine region and around the Gard département in the Languedoc-Roussillon region. The vine produces high yields and ripens late, creating a wine that is deeply colored with a distinct, earthy flavor. Couderc noir is normally used for mass commercial and table wines. The grape was planted throughout France following the devastation of the phylloxera epidemic in the late 19th century and until the 1970s there were more plantings of Couderc noir in France than Cabernet Sauvignon.

== History and pedigree ==
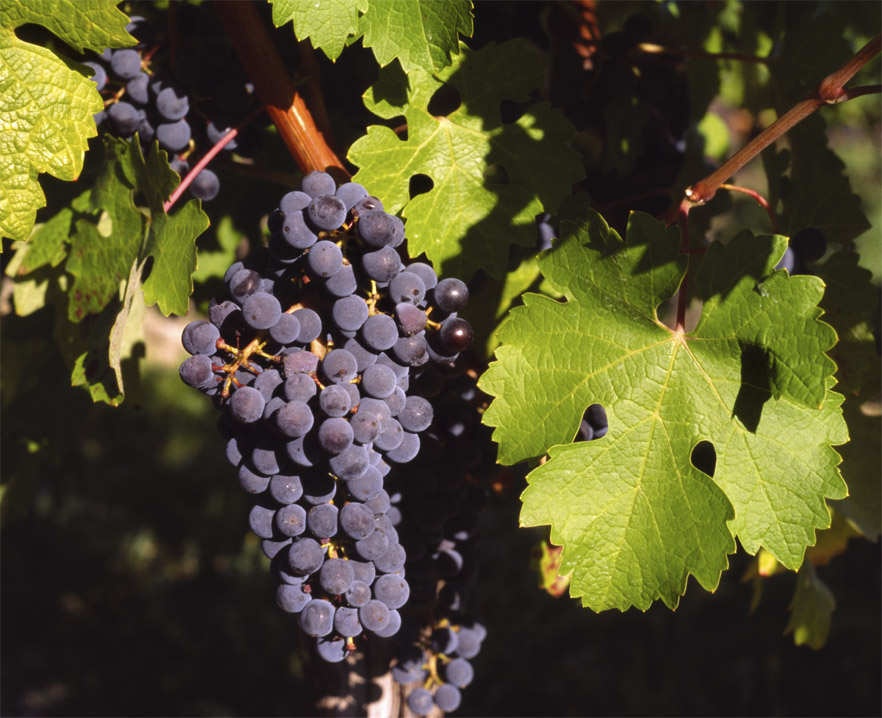
Up until the 1970s there were more plantings of Couderc noir in France than there was of Cabernet Sauvignon (pictured).

Couderc noir is a natural inter-species crossing between an unknown Vitis vinifera variety and Munson (also known as Jaeger 70). The Munson grape itself is an inter-species hybrid created from two American grapevine species Vitis lincecumii and Vitis rupestris. Couderc noir was discovered in 1886 in the garden of a pastry chef named Contassot from Aubenas in the Ardèche department. Contassot had plantings of Munson and when he observed the characteristics of this new vine, he gave the seeds to grape breeders Georges Couderc and Albert Seibel who began working with the variety. Couderc's "series 71" cutting of the vine was the most commercially successful and the grape was formally named after him.

Like many French-American hybrids, Couderc noir was widely planted throughout France following the devastation of the phylloxera epidemic in the late 19th century. Its productiveness and disease resistance kept it in favor well into the 20th century even after advances in phylloxera-resistant rootstock grafting allowed traditional French vinifera to return in full force. By the end of the 1950s there were 65,770 acres (26,616 hectares) of Couderc noir planted throughout France, well more than Cabernet Sauvignon. In fact, it wasn't until the 1970s that years of vine pulling schemes by the French government reduced Couderc noir's numbers enough to allow Cabernet Sauvignon to surpass the hybrid in total plantings.

== Viticulture ==
Couderc noir is known as a vigorous vine prone to producing high yields. It has a tendency to bud early and ripen late producing small, compact bunches that have a very low skin to juice ratio. The main viticultural hazard for the variety is its susceptibility to developing chlorosis which can inhibit chlorophyll production in the leaves and adversely impact photosynthesis.

== Wine regions ==
In 2009, there were 529 acres (214 hectares) of Couderc noir growing in southern and southwestern France with its numbers steadily declining. Outside France there has been an uptick of interest in the variety in the American wine growing region of Missouri where botanist Hermann Jaeger, father of the Munson grape, did much of his grape breeding. In the Augusta AVA of Missouri it can have difficulties ripening in some vintages.

In Brazil there is 1,231 acres (498 hectares) of a table grape variety known as Couderc but DNA testing has revealed to be a different grape variety.

== Styles ==
Like many French-American hybrids, Couderc noir has a distinctive foxy non-Vinifera flavor that Master of Wine Jancis Robinson notes can be "off-putting" to those more familiar with vinifera grapes. The grape has a tendency to produce deeply colored wines but can also be used to produce rosé.

== Synonyms ==
Among the synonyms that Couderc noir has been known as over the years include: Couderc 7120, 7120 C, Contassot 20, Couderc 71-20 and Plant Verni.

== See also ==
- List of grape varieties
