= List of wineries in Missouri =

This is a list of wineries in Missouri. German immigrants in the early-to-mid-19th century founded the wine industry in Missouri, resulting in its wine corridor being called the Missouri "Rhineland". Later Italian immigrants also entered wine production. In the mid-1880s, more wine was produced by volume in Missouri than in any other state. Before prohibition, Missouri was the second-largest wine-producing state in the nation. Missouri had the first area recognized as a federally designated American Viticultural Area with the Augusta AVA acknowledged on June 20, 1980. There are now four AVAs in Missouri. In 2021 there were over 130 wineries operating in the state of Missouri, up from 92 in 2009.

Name	Location	Established	Notes
7Cs Winery	Walnut Grove, Missouri	2009	
Adam Puchta Winery	Hermann, Missouri	1855	The winery reopened in 1989 after Prohibition.
Albonée Country Inn and Winery	Independence, Missouri		
Amigoni Urban Winery	Kansas City, Missouri	2006	Winery is exclusively vinifera wine.
Apple Creek Vineyard & Winery	Friedheim, Missouri	2012	
Arcadian Moon Winery & Brewery	Higginsville, Missouri		
Augusta Winery	Augusta, Missouri	1988	
Backyard Vine & Wine	Maryville, Missouri	2008	
Balducci Vineyards	Augusta, Missouri	2001	
Baltimore Bend Vineyard	Waverly, Missouri	1997	
Bear Creek Wine Company	Walnut Shade, Missouri		Also operates a small batch brewery.
Belmont Vineyards	Leasburg, Missouri		
Belvoir Winery	Liberty, Missouri	2011	Said to be haunted
Bias Vineyards and Winery	Berger, Missouri	1980	Also operates Gruhlke's Microbrewery onsite.
Black Silo Winery	Trenton, Missouri	2010	Family-owned and operated winery.
Blumenhof Winery	Dutzow, Missouri	1979	All wines made from locally-grown grapes.
Buffalo Creek Winery	Stover, Missouri		
Bushwhacker Bend Winery	Glasgow, Missouri		
Cave Hollow West Winery	Hannibal, Missouri	2012	Located on the grounds of the Mark Twain Cave Complex.
Cave Vineyard	Ste. Genevieve, Missouri		
Cedar Lake Cellars	Wright City, Missouri	2002	
Chandler Hill Vineyards	Defiance, Missouri		
Charleville Vineyards	Ste. Genevieve, Missouri		
Chaumette Vineyards and Winery	Ste. Genevieve, Missouri	1990	
Claverach Farm and Vineyards	Eureka, Missouri		
Cooper's Oak Winery	Higbee, Missouri	2006	Also operates Skullsplitter Spirits Distillery onsite.
Crown Valley Winery	Ste. Genevieve, Missouri		
Durso Hills Winery and Bistro	Marquand, Missouri		
Edg-Clif Vineyard & Winery	Potosi, Missouri	2008	
Fahrmeier Family Vineyards	Lexington, Missouri	2008	
Fence Stile Vineyards and Winery	Excelsior Springs, Missouri	2009	
Hermannhof Winery	Hermann, Missouri	1974	The winery initially opened in 1852.
LaChance Vineyards	De Soto, Missouri	2010	
Les Bourgeois Winery	Rocheport, Missouri	1985	Missouri's third largest winery just west of the city of Columbia, Missouri on the Missouri River
Lindwedel Winery	Branson, Missouri	2007	
Lost Creek Vineyard	Warren County, Missouri	2011	
Mallinson Vineyard and Hall	Sugar Creek, Missouri		Located at a meeting point of the historic Lewis and Clark, Santa Fe, California and Oregon trails
Meramec Vineyards Winery	St. James, Missouri	1980	Missouri's fourth largest winery.
Mount Pleasant Estates	Augusta, Missouri	1859	It reopened after Prohibition in 1968.
OakGlenn Vineyards and Winery	Hermann, Missouri	1997	The winery is located on a bluff with views of the Missouri River.
Pirtle Winery	Weston, Missouri	1978	
Serenity Valley Winery	Fulton, Missouri		Mid-Missouri winery with a serene lake and spectacular sunsets, offering red, white and boutique wines.
St. James Winery	St. James, Missouri	1970	Largest winery in Missouri. It is on the National Register of Historic Places.
Stone Hill Winery	Hermann, Missouri	1847	Second largest winery in Missouri. In 1965, it became first Missouri winery to reopen after Prohibition.
Stonehaus Farms Vineyard and Winery	Lee's Summit, Missouri	1996	
Triple 3 Vineyard	Washington, Missouri	2021	
Vox Vineyards	Kansas City, Missouri	1996	100% estate grower-producer specializing in rare and obscure native grape varieties.
Watertower Winery	Ste. Genevieve, Missouri	2013	
Weingarten Vineyard	Ste. Genevieve, Missouri		
West Winery	Macon, Missouri	2007	
Weston Wine Company	Weston, Missouri	2014	
White Mule Winery	Owensville, Missouri	2004	
Wild Sun Winery	Hillsboro, Missouri		Also operates a small batch brewery.
Wildlife Ridge Winery	Smithton, Missouri	2013	
Windy Wine Company	Osborn, Missouri		

== See also ==
- Missouri wine
