= Lucian W. Dressel =

American investor, entrepreneur, and businessperson

- Education: Granite City, H.S. Harvard (BA); Columbia University (MBA)
- Occupations: winemaker; grape grower
- Years active: 1960–present
- Website: davisvines.com

Lucian W. Dressel is an American winemaker and viticulturist. Dressel wrote the application to have Augusta, Missouri, designated as America's first officially recognized wine district by the federal government.

== Augusta and Mt. Pleasant ==
After earning an MBA from Columbia, Dressel initially worked at the family Aro-Dressel Dairy in Granite City, Illinois. He was also teaching at Southern Illinois University, Edwardsville, where after a year he was promoted to be the first Assistant Dean of the Business School. Dressel then moved on to become the first Director of Development for the St. Louis Symphony Orchestra. In 1966, Dressel bought the property of the old Mt. Pleasant Wine Co. in Augusta, Missouri, which was forced to close in 1920 with the advent of prohibition. When he obtained his federal wine license he was the youngest person in the country to own a permit to operate a winery.

During the 15 years from 1968 to 1993 when the Dressels owned the winery it won 218 gold medals for its wines at national and international competitions, including a gold medal at the International Wine & Spirit Competition in London for Mount Pleasant's 1986 vintage port.

During the National League baseball playoffs in 1987 between the St. Louis Cardinals and the San Francisco Giants, a competition was set up in San Francisco between Missouri's Mount Pleasant Brut versus Domaine Chandon from Napa Valley in Northern California. Five California wine judges were flown in to mediate at the Washington Square Bar & Grill in San Francisco. When the results were tallied Mt. Pleasant won, 56-17 in the blind taste testing. The unexpected victory made national headlines, and one of the judges, wine critic Robert Finigan, praised Mount Pleasant in his national newsletter Robert Finigan's Private Guide to Wines.

== Davis, California ==
Shortly after selling the winery in 1982, Dressel moved to Davis, California. With consultation and advice from Dr. Harold Olmo, and assistance (and vines) from the staff of the National Germ Plasm Repository he bred and developed a new family of wine grape vines by crossing Cabernet Sauvignon and Zinfandel with America's best red wine grape, Norton.

== Return to the Midwest ==
In 2002, Dressel was approached by California investors who wished to create a new winery in Illinois that would grow new wine grapes and make European style wine. He and his son Joseph Dressel were hired to design and build the 100,000 gallon capacity winery and make the wine. From 2003 to 2011, Lucian Dressel served as the General Manager of the winery while Joseph was the Wine Maker. During this time, the winery became the second largest in the state of Illinois and won many awards for quality, most notably being one of only six wines, out of the over 120 entered, to win a Gold Medal at the only National Norton Festival held in 2007.

== Music ==
In 1992, Dressel composed "A Visit from St. Nicholas," a cantata using the text of the 1923 poem by the same name. The cantata was first performed by the Webster University Orchestra and Chorus.

In 2008, Dressel collaborated with Dr. Diane Sol on the musical portions of her new translation of "ANTIGONE" performed at Southern Illinois University, Edwardsville.
