= German Society of Pennsylvania =

The German Society of Pennsylvania
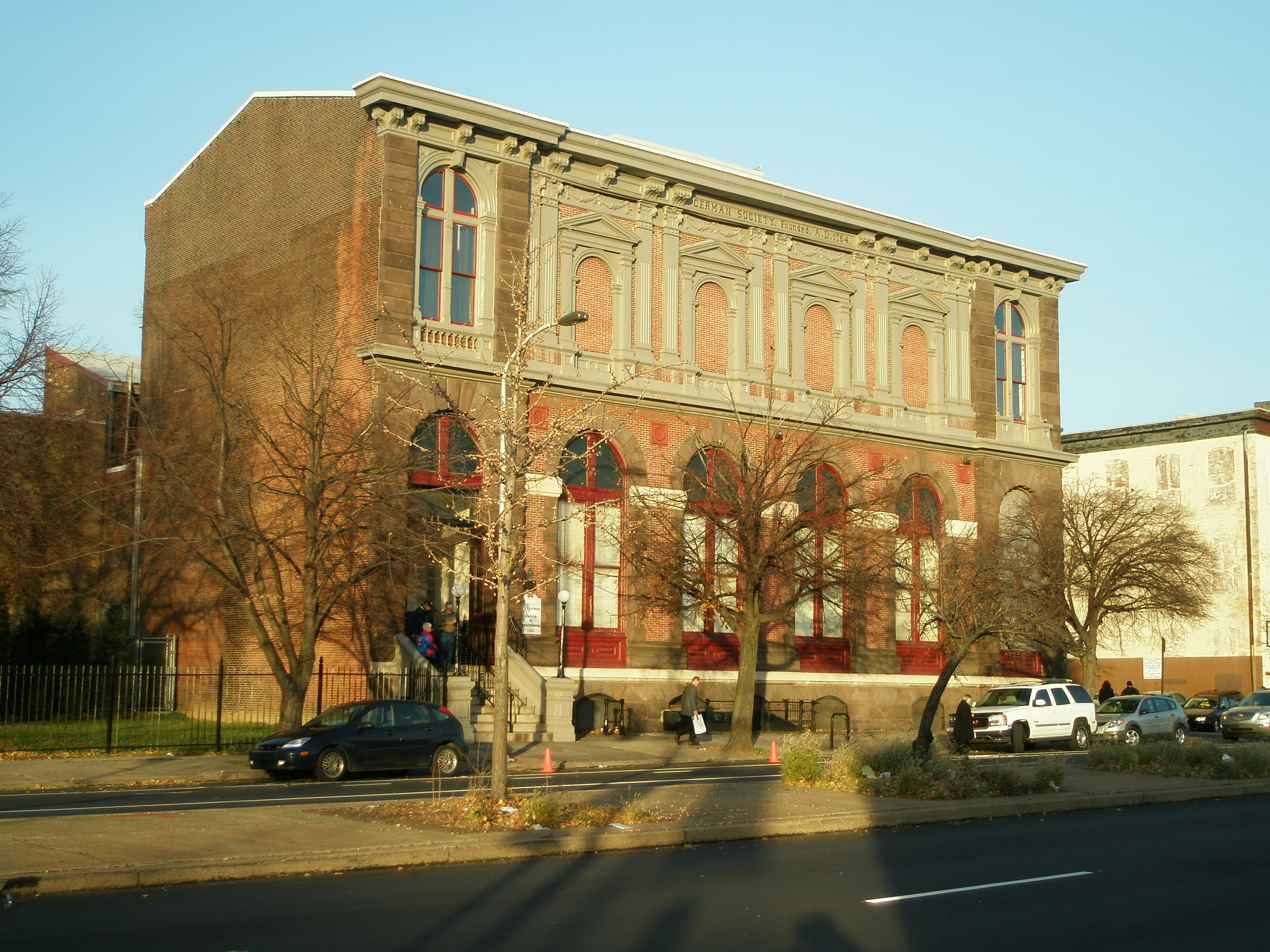
- Interactive map of The German Society of Pennsylvania

The German Society of Pennsylvania, located in the Northern Liberties neighborhood of Philadelphia, is the oldest German culture organization in the United States. Founded in 1764, to aid German immigrants, including those who arrived as indentured servants, it now promotes the teaching of the German language and culture, sponsors lectures, concerts and films, and awards scholarships.

== History ==
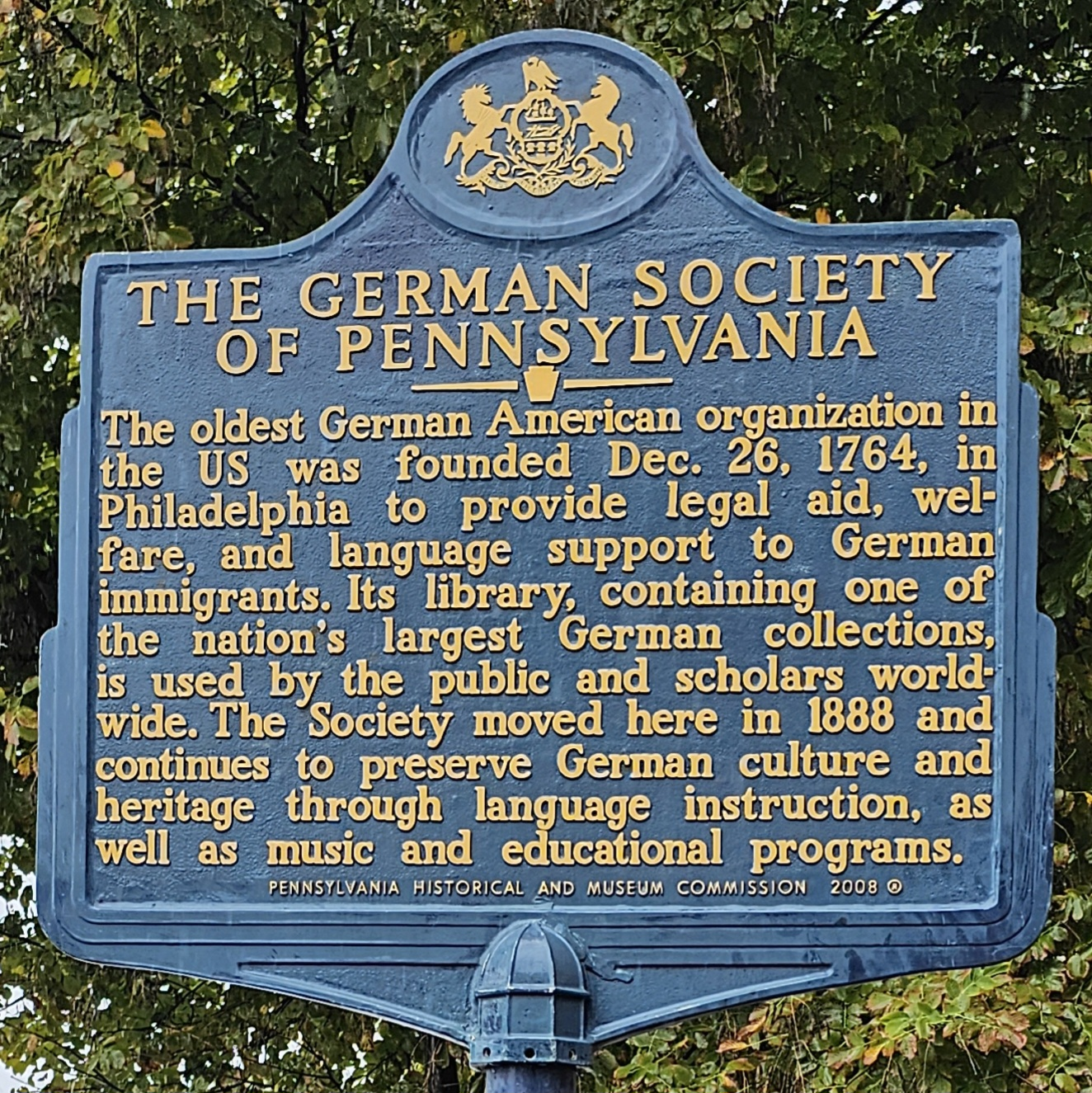
State historical marker for the society

The society's Joseph P. Horner Memorial Library is the largest private German-language library outside of Germany. The Library was founded in 1817 and throughout its history collected a wide variety of literature and periodicals to serve the reading interests of German Society members; it continues to operate as a lending library today, with a focus on fiction, biography, and children's books in German.

In 1867, under the leadership of Oswald Seidensticker, an archive was established, with the aim of documenting German-American history and culture, and that remains the primary mission of the Library today. Among the holdings are many early products of the German-American press, including a 1743 Christoph Sauer Bible, the first European-language Bible printed in North America. As a research institution, the Horner Library is also known for its pamphlet and manuscript collections related to German-American organizations and individuals, and its holdings of 19th-century popular German works that have become rare.

Since 1888, the Society has been located at 611 Spring Garden Street in Philadelphia. Many of the city's German-culture public artworks were commissioned by the organization, including the statue of Peter Muhlenberg that now stands behind the Philadelphia Museum of Art, and the monument honoring Francis Daniel Pastorius and the first German settlers, in Vernon Park in the Germantown section of Philadelphia.

== Bibliography ==
- Oswald Seidensticker, der Deutschen Gesellschaft von Pennsylvanien, von der Zeit der Gründung, 1764 bis zum Jahre 1876: Festgabe zum Jubeljahre der Republik (1876)
- Hundertjährige Feier der Incorporation der Deutschen Gesellschaft von Pennsylvanien (20. September 1781), gehalten in der St. George's Halle, Philadelphia, am 11. October 1881 (1882)
- Harry W. Pfund, A History of the German Society of Pennsylvania, Bicentenary Edition 1764-1964 (Philadelphia: The German Society of Pennsylvania, 1964).
