= George Bayer (Missouri Rhineland) =

Music teacher and land locator

George Bayer (27 September 1800 – 18 March 1839), was born in Karlsruhe, Baden Palatinate of the Holy Roman Empire, and died in Hermann, Missouri. He was a music teacher and land locator, and is honored as the founder of Hermann, Missouri and of the Missouri Rhineland.

== Biography ==
Bayer, a trained organist, emigrated in 1830 from the Grand Duchy of Baden to a German-speaking community in Philadelphia. He established himself as a teacher of keyboard instruments, and in 1831 married Katharine Krecker. His Pennsylvania ethnic community, although prosperous, grew increasingly concerned about assimilation. In 1837 the German Settlement Society of Philadelphia deputized Bayer to scout the U.S. frontier. His goal was to find a region of land with agricultural potential and with a climate suitable for the reproduction of German-speaking culture.

Utilizing his childhood memories of northern Baden, Bayer located and purchased 11,300 acres of east-central Missouri land for the Society for a price of $1.38/acre. He believed he had found land suitable to grow wine grapes similar to those cultivated in the German Rhineland. Key members of the Society were closely aligned with the weltanschauung of German Romanticism; they and Bayer looked forward to the creation of a German-speaking section of Missouri that would be liberated from the sinful temptations of English-speaking cities. The leaders laid out a planned capital for the new province and named it "Hermann," in honor of Arminius, the ethno-Romantic figure who had successfully led German rebels against legions of the invading Roman Empire in 9 CE.

Inspired by their hopes, members of the Society began to emigrate to the new Missouri settlement in 1837. George Bayer joined them as their field leader in spring 1838, with charge of surveying the land parcel, assigning lots to settlers, procuring food to eat prior to the first harvests, and distributing essential supplies to the settlers. Unfortunately, it was at this moment that a severe cholera epidemic broke out.

The accumulated demands of Bayer’s duties weighed upon both him and his fellow settlers. Many of the pioneers met poverty and even death in rural Missouri. Dissent grew exponentially, and angry letters moved back and forth between Hermann and the Philadelphia headquarters of the Society. Bayer was ignominiously dismissed from his honors and duties. Shortly afterward in 1839, Bayer died suddenly in Hermann.

After more than a century of disgrace, Bayer’s reputation began to be restored in the 1970s. The resumption of interest in the fallen leader coincided with the growth of the American craft wine industry; the success of vineyards planted on the Bayer parcel proved that he had located good land. The area around Hermann is today known as the Missouri Rhineland. An unofficial community meeting in 1986 ceremonially cleared him of the charges of tyrannical incompetence under which his reputation had previously labored.

== Legacy ==
A statue of Bayer has been erected on the grounds of the Gasconade County Historical Society in Hermann, Missouri. It pays tribute to the leader and founder of the county community.
