= St. Vincent grape =

Variety of grape

St. Vincent
- Grape (Vitis)
- Color of berry skin: Dark Purple to Black
- Species: Hybrid grape
- Origin: Dressel Vineyard, Augusta, Missouri
- Notable regions: Missouri, Arkansas, Illinois, Nebraska, Ohio, Pennsylvania, Michigan, Kansas, and New York

St. Vincent is a red wine grape that originated in the United States from a chance seedling that first came to the attention of Scott G. Toedebusch, in 1973, while managing a vineyard owned by Lucian W. Dressel in Augusta, Missouri. Dressel originally called the vine “Stromboli” because the leaves turned a bright red in the fall, and the vines had volcanic production. Philip Wagner of Boordy Nursery in Maryland, one of the original propagators of the vine, suggested that a more melodious name would be St. Vincent, (the name of the patron saint of the Cote d'Or in Burgundy), and the name was changed.

== St. Vincent grape ==
St. Vincent has a large berry size with rather loose clusters. It can be high in vigor in fertile locations and has proven to be winter hardy to Midwestern conditions. In Missouri the grapes matures in late season.

Training is best if done to the single wire high cordon system with spur pruning. A good spray control program is necessary to control fungus diseases.

== Wine regions ==
St. Vincent has been planted widely in the Midwest, particularly in Missouri where it is one of the three major red wine grape varieties used for dry wine that are grown there. At least 13 wineries in Missouri are currently producing and selling St. Vincent wine.

St. Vincent is also grown commercially by vineyards in Arkansas, Illinois, Nebraska, Ohio, Pennsylvania, Michigan, Kansas, Colorado and New York.

== Wine style ==
St. Vincent can make wine similar to an Italian Chianti with cherry and citrus flavors and a long and complex aftertaste. St. Vincent can also make an excellent sparkling rosé.
