= Chardonel =

Variety of grape

- Grape (Vitis)
- Color of berry skin: Blanc
- Species: American hybrid (50% Seyval; 50% Vitis vinifera Chardonnay)
- Origin: New York State Agricultural Experiment Station 1953
- Notable regions: USA
- VIVC number: 16072

Chardonel is a late ripening white wine hybrid grape which can produce a high quality wine with varietal character. It is a result of a cross made by the New York State Agricultural Experiment Station of the popular French American hybrid Seyval and the classic vitis vinifera Chardonnay. It is distinguished by its superior wine quality combined with high productivity and cold hardiness superior to its acclaimed parent Chardonnay. The vine is vigorous and productive, producing green grapes with large clusters.
