= Vignoles (grape) =

Variety of grape

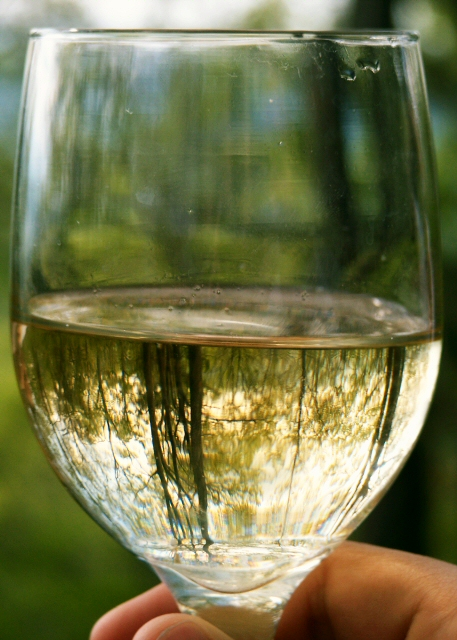
A glass of Vignoles wine.

Vignoles is a complex hybrid wine grape variety presumed to have been developed by French grape breeder J.F. Ravat. It was originally named Ravat 51. According to Ravat, "Ravat 51" was the result of a cross made in 1930 using the complex hybrid wine grape Seibel 6905 (also known as Le Subereux) and a clone of Pinot Noir known as Pinot de corton. Despite its French-sounding name, the Vignoles grape is mostly grown in North America. Originally named "Vignoles" by the Finger Lakes Wine Growers Association in 1970, genetic testing has recently proved that Vignoles does not share any major genetic markers in common with Seibel 6905 or Pinot Noir. Thus, Vignoles is unrelated to the "Ravat 51" grapevine that was imported into the US in 1949 and the parentage of Vignoles is currently unknown.

Viticulturally, Vignoles is described as moderately vigorous with moderate yields, late season bud break, an upright and open growth habit, small very compact bunches that are highly susceptible to Botrytis bunch rot, an average of 105 days from bloom to harvest, high sugar with high acid at maturity, average overall disease resistance, and moderate winter hardiness (−10 to −15 °F (−23 to −26 °C)).

Enologically, Vignoles is often prized for its ability to produce balanced and fruity late-harvest style sweet white wines, including ice wine, although Vignoles is also used to produce fruity dry and off-dry white wines as well.

In the United States, Vignoles is most commonly grown in New York state's Finger Lakes region, and in the Midwest including Missouri, Indiana, Ohio, Illinois, Iowa and Kentucky.
