= Norton (grape) =

Variety of grape

- Grape (Vitis)
- Norton grapes growing on the vine
- Color of berry skin: Noir
- Species: V. vinifera, V. aestivalis, V. labrusca hybrid
- Notable regions: Missouri USA
- Breeder: Daniel Norborne Norton
- VIVC number: 3304

Norton is a grapevine variety grown in the Midwestern United States, the Mid-Atlantic States, and northeastern Georgia. Nuclear and chloroplast DNA data are consistent with 'Norton' being a complex hybrid with ancestry from V. aestivalis, V. vinifera, and V. labrusca.

Norton was first cultivated in Richmond, Virginia, and is the official grape of the State of Missouri, and is considered the cornerstone of the Missouri wine industry. Daniel Norton first purveyed the Norton cultivar during the early 19th century from his vineyards in Virginia, USA.

== History ==
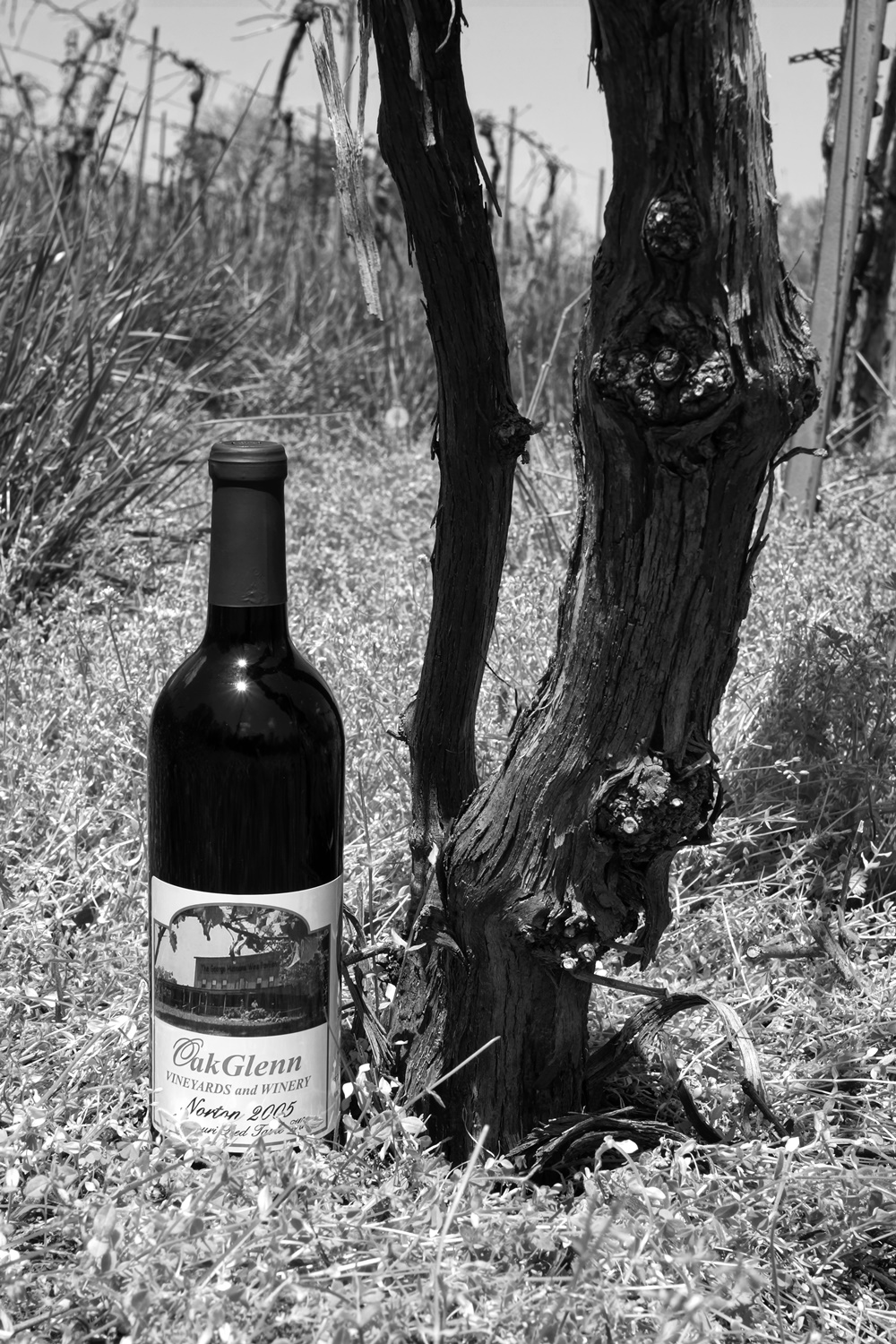
A bottle of Norton wine sits next to what is believed to be a 170-year-old Norton/Cynthiana grapevine in Hermann, MO.

The Norton cultivar was introduced by Daniel Norborne Norton of Richmond, Virginia, who selected it from among what he believed were seedlings of a long-forgotten grape variety called Bland, though there is some doubt as to whether it was the actual source of the seed which yielded Norton. The male parent, presumably, was a wild vine of Vitis aestivalis. Another cultivar, called Cynthiana, closely resembles Norton, but has traditionally been considered a separate variety. Genetic studies, however, have shown the two to be indistinguishable.

This grape became available commercially in 1830 and very soon after that came to dominate wine production in the eastern and midwestern states like Missouri and Ohio in the United States. Since this grape lacks the distinct, "foxy" flavors that are typical of Native American Vitis labrusca grapes, it is quite suitable for making dry wine.

Prohibition brought hard times for Norton growers. Vineyards were pulled up and Concord grapes were planted in their place, for juice and jam. After prohibition, the wine industry in the eastern half of North America never recovered to the same degree that California's wine industry did.

In the 21st century, United States wineries along the east coast and throughout the Midwest are re-cultivating and producing wines from Norton grapes, such as at Chrysalis Vineyards in Middleburg, Virginia, which has 69 acres (28 ha) of Norton grapes.

== Anthocyanin content ==
Notable for deep blue-purple pigmentation, the skin of Norton grapes has a higher content of total anthocyanins (888 mg per 100 g) than other purple grape cultivars, Concord or Marechal Foch grapes.

Anthocyanins are the largest group of water-soluble pigments in the plant kingdom and belong to the family of compounds known as polyphenols. Major sources of anthocyanins are blueberries, cherries, raspberries, strawberries, blackcurrants, purple grapes, and red wine. Anthocyanins are under basic research to understand if they have any biological role in humans.

== See also ==
- Missouri wine
- Virginia wine
