= Arkansas wine =

Wines made from grapes grown in Arkansas

Arkansas
- Wine region
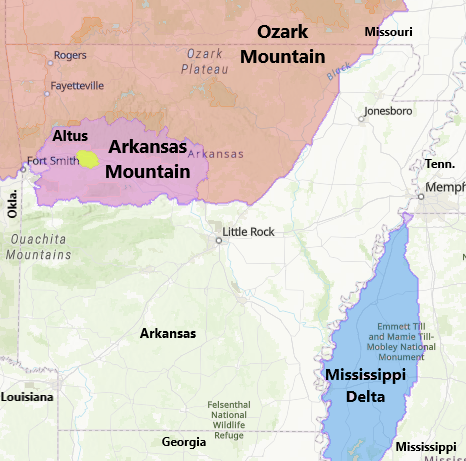
- Official name: State of Arkansas
- Type: U.S. State Appellation
- Year established: 1836
- Years of wine industry: 146
- Country: United States
- Other regions in vicinity: Kentucky, Mississippi, Missouri, Oklahoma, Tennessee
- Sub-regions: Altus AVA, Arkansas Mountain AVA, Ozark Mountain AVA
- Climate region: Humid subtropical/continental in highlands
- Total area: 33.3 million acres (52,035 sq mi)
- No. of vineyards: 14
- Grapes produced: Cabernet Sauvignon, Catawba, Chardonnay, Concord, Edelweiss, Merlot, Müller-Thurgau, Muscadine, Niagara, Norton, Scheurebe, Seyval blanc, Verdelet, Vidal blanc, Vignoles
- No. of wineries: 10

Arkansas wine refers to wine made from grapes grown in the U.S. state of Arkansas. Many of these wines are grown from traditional European wine grapes of the Vitis vinifera group such as Cabernet Sauvignon, Chardonnay, Pinot noir, and Riesling and also produces wine from its native grapes, Cynthiana and Muscadine.

== History ==
Arkansas viticulture dates back to the 1880s when the first French Catholic settlers started commercial winemaking with Catholic Swiss-Germans, who immigrated to Altus, Arkansas and found the terroir ideal to grow grapes. One of these settlers was Jacob Post, who emigrated to the area in 1872 and his descendants are sixth generation winemakers. The four oldest running wineries in the state (Wiederkehr, Post, Mount Bethel and Cowie) are all located in Altus. At one point Arkansas had 160 wineries and produced more wine and grapes than any other state. Prohibition in the United States reduced the wineries to only a few that remain today, and about half of Arkansas's counties remain dry.

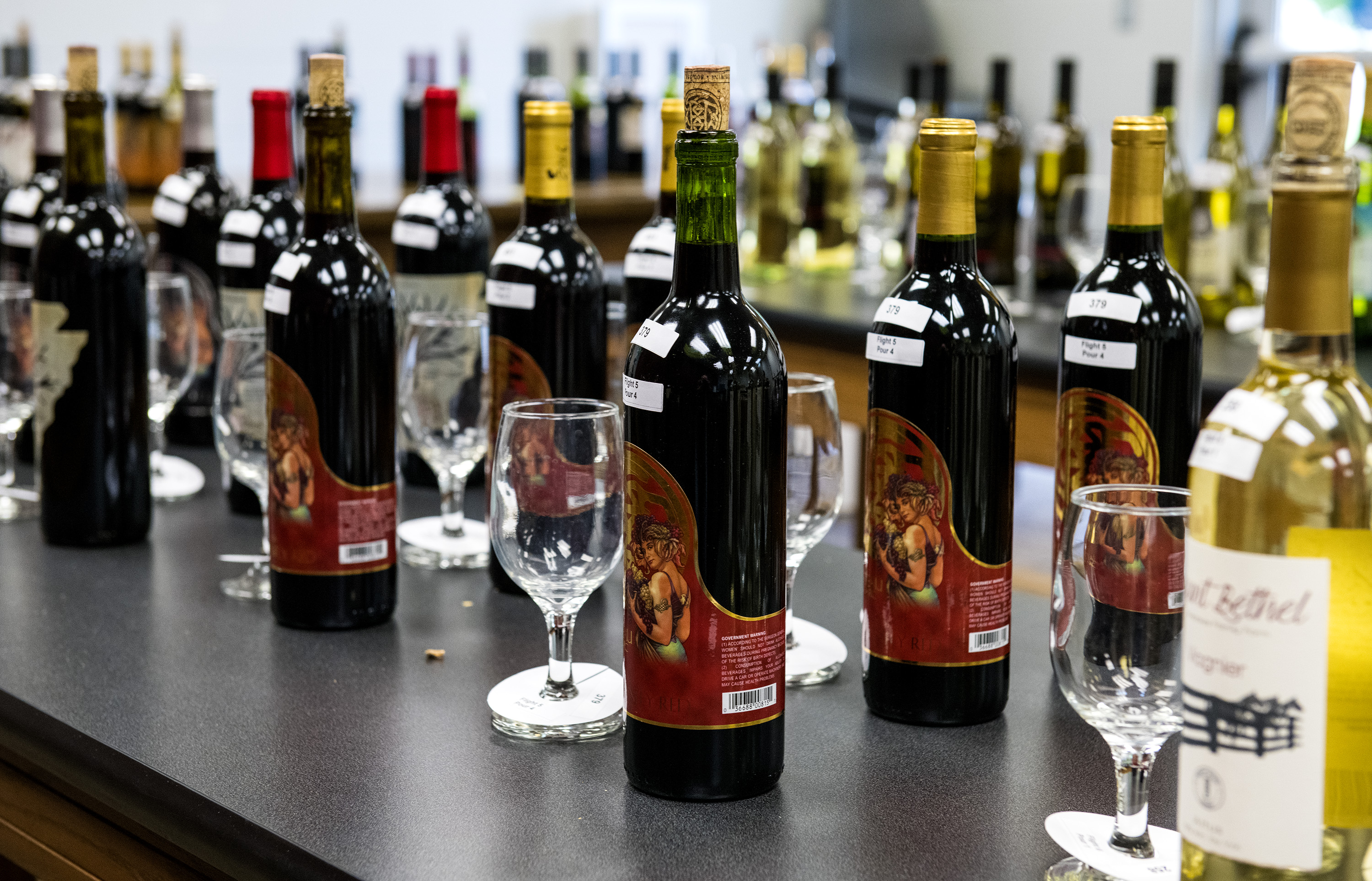
Wines from Arkansas winemakers during a tasting in 2021

== Present day ==
As of 2026, there are at least ten wineries listed in Arkansas, and the state has three established American Viticultural Areas (AVA). The University of Arkansas has worked with the Post family for nearly a century to develop new grapes and harvesting technology. John Clark, a horticulture professor at the University of Arkansas, has worked for 20 years on grapes that can withstand Arkansas' natural problems, such as high humidity.

== See also ==
- American wine
