= Arkansas Mountain AVA =

American Viticultural Area in Arkansas

Coordinates: 35°27′19″N 93°45′43″W

Arkansas Mountain
- Wine region
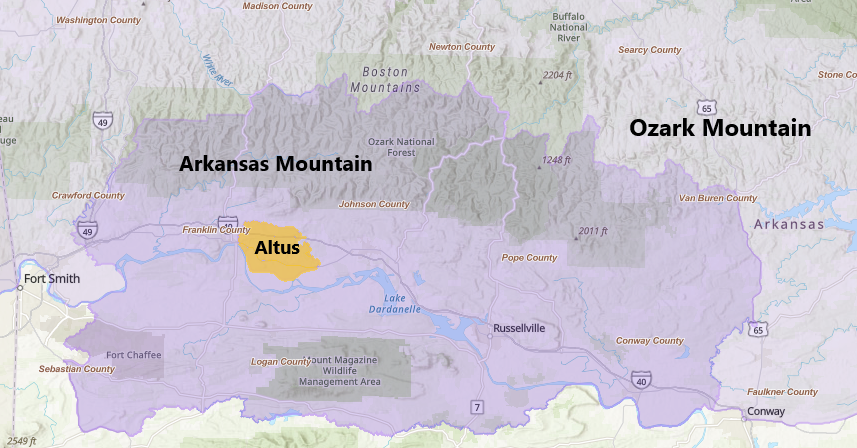
- Type: American Viticultural Area
- Year established: 1986
- Country: United States
- Part of: Arkansas, Ozark Mountain AVA
- Sub-regions: Altus AVA
- Growing season: 206 days
- Climate region: Continental/humid subtropical
- Precipitation (annual average): 45 in (1,100 mm)
- Soil conditions: fine sandy loam"
- Total area: 2.9 million acres (4,500 sq mi)
- Size of planted vineyards: 1,800 acres (730 ha)
- No. of vineyards: 5

Arkansas Mountain is an American Viticultural Area (AVA) located in the mountainous Ozark Mountains of Arkansas bisected by the Arkansas River. It was established as the nation's 87^{th} and the state's third appellation on September 26, 1986 by the Bureau of Alcohol, Tobacco and Firearms (ATF), Treasury after reviewing the petition submitted by Mr. Al Wiederkehr, chairman of the board and chief executive officer of Wiederkehr Wine Cellars in Altus, Arkansas, on behalf of himself and local vintners, proposing a viticultural area in northwestern Arkansas to be known as "Arkansas Mountain."
It is a sub-appellation within the larger multi-state Ozark Mountain AVA, established two months prior, that expands north into Missouri as far as St. Louis, and south into northeastern Oklahoma toward Tulsa. Arkansas Mountain viticultural area overlaps the smaller 12,800-acre (20 sq mi) Altus viticultural area, the state's initial AVA established in 1984, within its boundaries because they share common terroir features. However, the three established areas still have unique characteristics to retain their viticultural area distinctions. Arkansas Mountain encompasses 2.9 million acres (4,500 sq mi) making it the ninth largest AVA as of 2008. At the outset, there were 1,200 acres (490 ha) under vine and six bonded wineries or bonded wine cellars authorized to operate within Arkansas Mountain.

== History ==
The name "Arkansas" came before Ozark or "Aux Arcs" which means "of the Arkansas" or "from among the Arkansas." The name "Arkansas" comes from the Arkansas Indians who lived in the area. The Arkansas River was given its name to indicate that it was the river of the Arkansas (Indians); therefore the "Arkansas River." The mountains in the vicinity of the Arkansas River were also given that name to mean also the mountains of the Arkansas (Indians); therefore the "Arkansas Mountains."
The growing of grapes is well suited to the climate and soils of the Ozarks. Viticulture was introduced early and was an important step toward the success of the German settlements at Hermann, Missouri to the north. In the 1880s, Catholic Swiss-Germans settled near Altus, Arkansas, on the extreme southern border of the Ozarks. They planted grapes on limestone soils in the Boston Mountain foothills overlooking the Arkansas Valley.
The art of winemaking passed from generation to generation by the Post family since the founder, Jacob Post, came to the Ozark Mountains in 1872. In the early 1800s, Johann Andreas Wiederkehr made fine wine in Switzerland, immigrated to the backwoods of the Ozark Mountain Foothills in 1880 and founded Arkansas' Wiederkehr Wine Cellars.
Arkansas wineries are scattered through the backwoods of the Ozark Mountains in the northern half of the state. The wines became quite popular in central Arkansas, and in recent years, Wiederkehr Wine Cellars has gained a national reputation for its products established by their forefather. Grapes also were grown by Italian immigrants who located in two widely separated Ozark communities. Both settlements, Tontitown in Washington County, Arkansas, and Rosati in eastern Phelps County, Missouri, were colonized in 1898 under the leadership of an Italian-born priest. The members of these colonies were fleeing from an ill-fated philanthropic colonization venture in southeastern Arkansas, where malaria had decimated their ranks. One reason for selecting the Ozarks locations was their suitability for growing grapes. Then, too, the Ozarks reminded them of their homeland in Italy, and the region was free of malaria. The rise of the grape industry at Tontitown was rapid. The place held no importance for vineyards in 1900, but by 1920, Washington County, with 150,000 vines, had become the chief vineyard county in the state. Similar expansion, albeit on a smaller scale, occurred at Rosati, Missouri and wineries flourished at the two colonies until Prohibition days. During the 1920s the Welch Company established several large vineyards in Washington and Benton counties to supply its new grape-juice plant in Springdale. By 1923 the company had sponsored the planting of five thousand acres (2,000 ha), of which one thousand (400) were along the Kansas City Southern Railway between the Arkansas-Missouri line and Siloam Springs.
During the 1930s and 1940s, grape production declined throughout the Ozarks. This may be attributed to many of the same factors that caused reduction in orcharding and truck farming: labor shortages, drought, and marketing problems. In recent years, viticulture has received a boost from the increasing popularity of wines as opposed to more robust beverages. Wine labels from Wiederkehr Wine Cellars and others have borne the ATF approved appellation "Arkansas Mountain" since as far back as 1974. The Ozark Mountain area is well known as a wine making region, as is shown by this quote: "Like all of the other American wine regions, the Ozarks [Mountains] are quietly seething with new ideas, new personalities, new grape varieties and a new sense of direction." The Stone Hill Winery at Hermann, Missouri reopened and the Maifest and Oktoberfest celebrated there have attracted attention to the excellent wines of the district. Plantings of Catawba and other grapes have increased, and the winery buys surpluses from the Rosati district to meet the demand for wine. New wineries have been established at St. James and Rosati. Most of the grapes in southwest Missouri and northwest Arkansas are grown under contract with the Welch's grape juice cannery at Springdale, Arkansas. Grapes are grown in the vicinity of Exeter, Missouri, and at other locations near the Arkansas border.

== Terroir ==
=== Geography ===
In establishing a viticultural area based on geographical features which affect viticultural features, ATF recognizes that the distinctions between a smaller area and its surroundings are more refined than the differences between a larger area and its surroundings. It is possible for a large viticultural area to contain approved viticultural areas, if each area fulfills the requirements for establishment of a viticultural area. Arkansas Mountain viticultural area is distinguished geographically from its surrounding areas:

(a) To the north and west, the area is distinguished from neighboring areas on the basis of mean winter minimum temperature. The petitioner submitted data collected over 50 years from 42 locations, seven inside the area and 35 outside of it. The data showed that locations to the north and west of the area regularly experience significantly colder mean winter minimum temperatures. According to Professor Justin R. Morris of the University of Arkansas Division of Agriculture, this distinction "is due to the effects of the mountains." The protective effects of the Arkansas mountains were described by, the petitioner, quoting at length from Natural Resources of the State of Arkansas (1869) by James M. Lewis. In that book, Mr. Lewis claimed that protection from cold northern weather is due to the fact that the Ozark and Ouachita Mountains range east and west, rather than north and south (as within the Appalachians, for example). Consequently, Mr. Lewis said, the mountains provide shelter from violent winds and sudden changes in temperature coming from the north.

(b) To the east, the data is ambiguous as to the existence of a temperature difference as described above. However, the eastern boundary does correspond approximately to a topographical change, where the Boston and Ouachita Mountains begif their descent to the alluvial plain of the Mississippi River. This topographical change is reflected in a change in the character of the soil; for instance, the Leadville-Taft soils begin to occur much more frequently; and, within the Linker and Mountainburg soils, there is an increasing predominance of the Linker variety and a corresponding drop-off in the Mountainburg.

(c) To the south, the boundary of the area delineates the extent of "soil types suitable for grape production." Additionally, Professor Morris stated, "All areas south of the Arkansas Mountain area would be considered in the Pierce's disease region and in these areas, the Vitis rotundifolia are best adapted since they are resistant or tolerant to Pierce's disease." Pierce's disease is a vine-destroying disease,' associated with warm climates, which attacks vines of the Vitis vinifera species from which most of the world's wines are produced. Vitis vinifera is grown in the Arkansas Mountain area, but has not been grown successfully in the region to the south of it.

=== Climate ===
The climate of the Altus area, within Arkansas Mountain AVA, is significantly affected by several geographic features which distinguish it from surrounding areas. The ridges of the Boston Mountains to the north provide a barrier against the penetration of cold air from the north in the winter, and the Arkansas River valley traps warm air in the summer. Nearby Ozark at 400 feet (120 m) has an average of 213 frost-free growing days a year. It has been observed that growers in the hills around Altus enjoy additional frost-free growing days because the colder air sinks to the river valley, and forces warmer air into the hills in the early spring and late fall. Approximately 45 inches of rainfall yearly provides plentiful moisture, so that irrigation is not always necessary. The USDA plant hardiness zone range from 7a to 8a.

=== Soil ===
Geologically, the Ozarks are regarded as an upland plateau, in which mountains and valleys have been carved out by numerous streams and rivers. The land is hilly to mountainous, and the soils are characteristically stony and well-drained. The distinctive soil of the Ozark region is "Clay from deeply weathered, well consolidated sedimentary and deeply weathered volcanic rocks."
