= Agriculture in Mississippi =

Agriculture forms an important part of the economy, society, and history of the American state of Mississippi. From colonization until the American Civil War agriculture in Mississippi was dominated by a plantation based cotton production system which relied on enslaved labor.

== History ==
Mississippi's rank as one of the poorest states is related to its dependence on cotton agriculture before and after the American Civil War, late development of its frontier bottomlands in the Mississippi Delta, repeated natural disasters of flooding in the late 19th and early 20th century that required massive capital investment in levees, and ditching and draining the bottomlands, and slow development of railroads to link bottomland towns and river cities. In addition, when Democrats regained control of the state legislature, they passed the 1890 constitution that discouraged corporate industrial development in favor of rural agriculture, a legacy that would slow the state's progress for years.

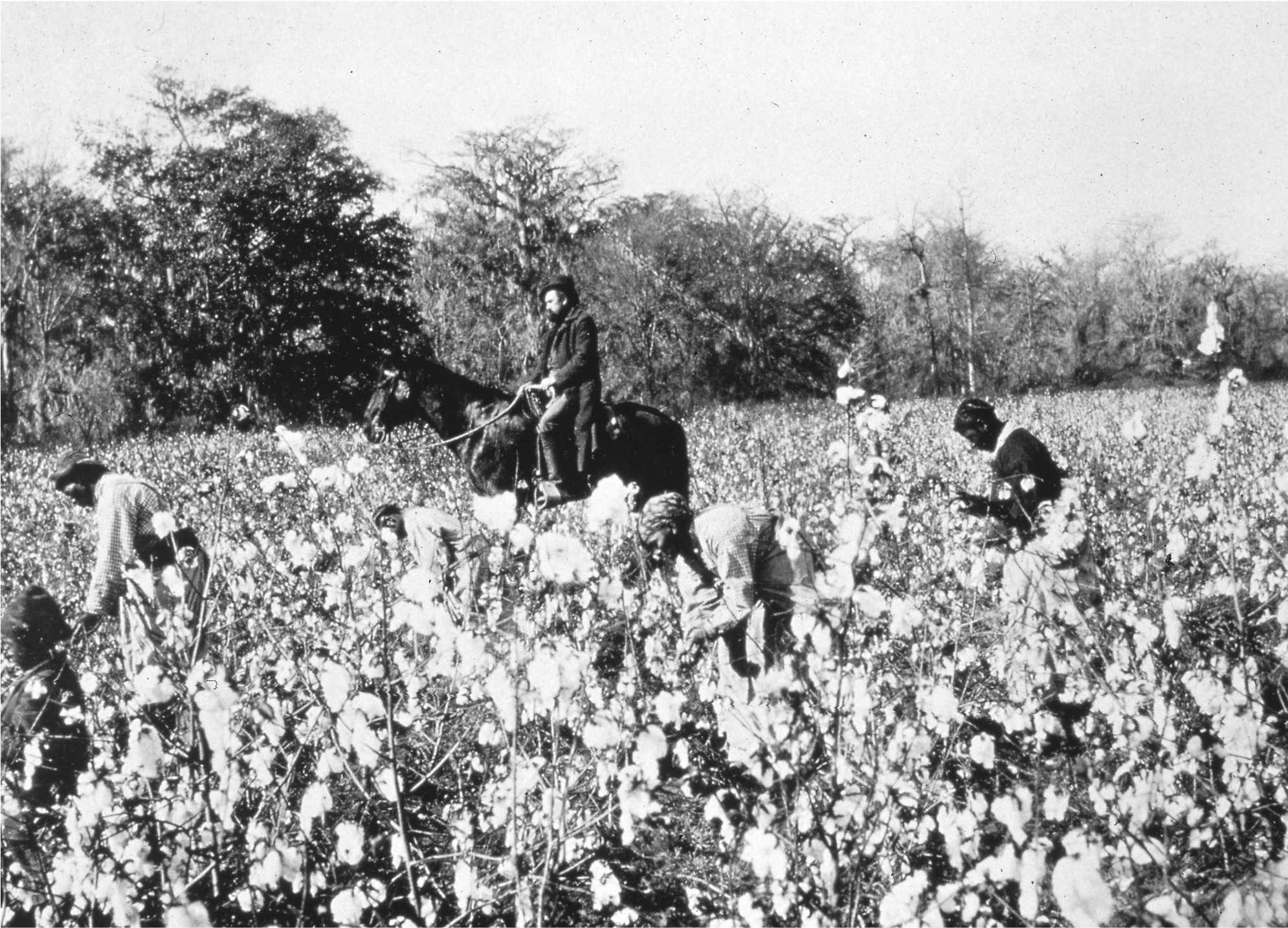
Slaves picking cotton while being observed by an overseer on horseback, c. 1850

Before the Civil War, Mississippi was the fifth-wealthiest state in the nation, its wealth generated by the labor of slaves in cotton plantations along the rivers.

Largely due to the domination of the plantation economy, focused on the production of agricultural cotton, the state's elite was reluctant to invest in infrastructure such as roads and railroads. They educated their children privately. Industrialization did not reach many areas until the late 20th century. The planter aristocracy, the elite of antebellum Mississippi, kept the tax structure low for their own benefit, making only private improvements. Before the war the most successful planters, such as Confederate President Jefferson Davis, owned riverside properties along the Mississippi and Yazoo rivers in the Mississippi Delta. Away from the riverfronts, most of the Delta was undeveloped frontier.

Blacks cleared land, selling timber and developing bottomland to achieve ownership. In 1900, two-thirds of farm owners in Mississippi were blacks, a major achievement for them and their families. Due to the poor economy, low cotton prices and difficulty of getting credit, many of these farmers could not make it through the extended financial difficulties. Two decades later, the majority of African Americans were sharecroppers. The low prices of cotton into the 1890s meant that more than a generation of African Americans lost the result of their labor when they had to sell their farms to pay off accumulated debts.

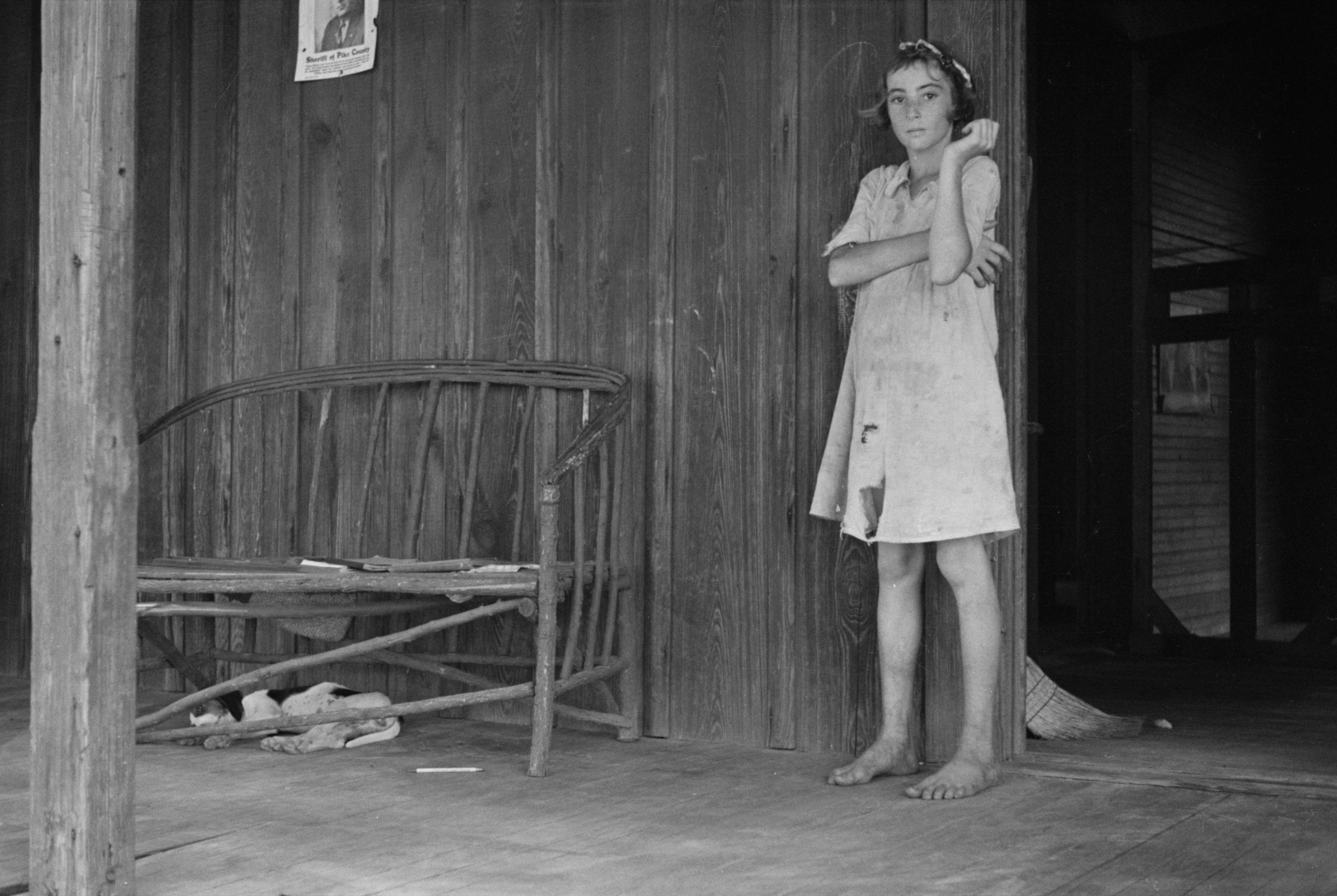
Sharecropper's daughter, Lauderdale County, 1935

After the Civil War, the state refused for years to build human capital by fully educating all its citizens. In addition, the reliance on agriculture grew increasingly costly as the state suffered loss of cotton crops due to the devastation of the boll weevil in the early 20th century, devastating floods in 1912–1913 and 1927, collapse of cotton prices after 1920, and drought in 1930.

Commercial blueberry cultivation began in 1980.

In the modern era more of an emphasis has been placed on sustainable agriculture.

The negative effects of overdevelopment and climate change on agriculture in California have made large scale commercial farming in the Mississippi Delta more attractive.

== Significant products ==
=== Blueberries ===
Many blueberry growers are organized as part of the Miss-Lou Blueberry Growers Cooperative (which also includes growers in Louisiana). 2,100 acres of blueberries were under cultivation in 2014.

The blueberry was made Mississippi's state fruit in 2023.

=== Wine ===

Mississippi wine refers to wine made from grapes grown in the U.S. state of Mississippi. The hot and humid climate of Mississippi makes it very difficult to cultivate vitis vinifera or French hybrid grapes. The three commercial wineries in Mississippi focus almost entirely on the Muscadine grape, a variety also used for non-alcoholic grape juices, jams, and jellies. Most of the Mississippi Delta AVA, a designated American Viticultural Area, lies within the state boundaries of Mississippi.

=== Poultry ===
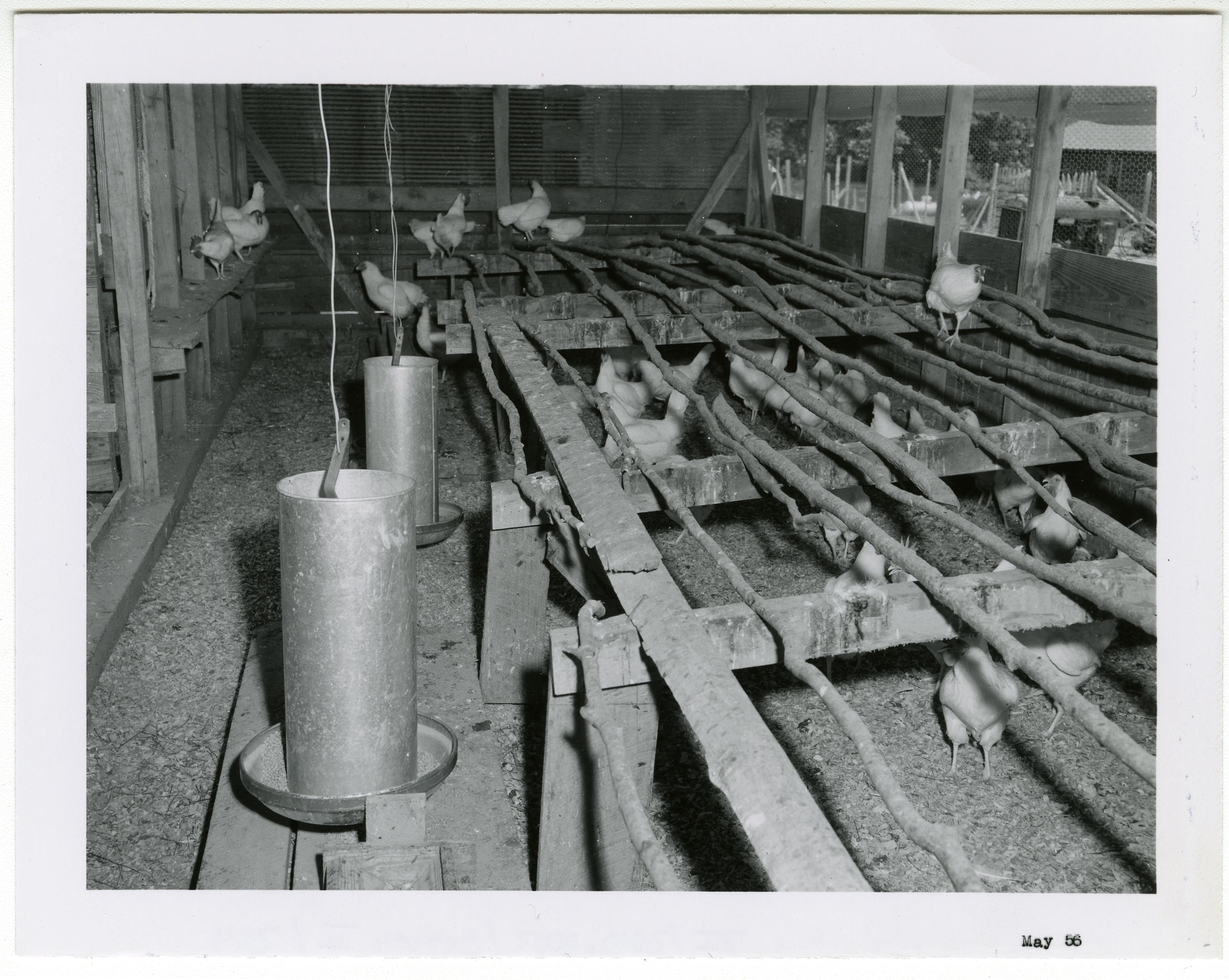
Historical poultry production in Mississippi

Poultry makes up the largest of Mississippi's agricultural production by value at $3.8 billion in 2023.

=== Soybeans ===
Soybean production was worth $1.3 billion in 2023.

== Education ==

Mississippi State University for Agriculture and Applied Science, commonly known as Mississippi State University (MSU), is a public land-grant research university in Mississippi State, Mississippi, United States. It is classified among "R1: Doctoral Universities – Very High Research Activity" and has a total research and development budget of $320 million, the largest in Mississippi.

The university was chartered as Mississippi Agricultural & Mechanical College on February 28, 1878, and admitted its first students in 1880. Organized into 12 colleges and schools, the university offers over 180 baccalaureate, graduate, and professional degree programs, and is home to Mississippi's only accredited programs in architecture and veterinary medicine. Mississippi State participates in the National Sea Grant College Program and National Space Grant College and Fellowship Program. The university's main campus in Starkville is supplemented by auxiliary campuses in Meridian, Gautier, and Biloxi.

Mississippi State's intercollegiate sports teams, the Mississippi State Bulldogs, compete in NCAA Division I athletics as members of the Southeastern Conference. Mississippi State was a founding member of the SEC in 1932. In their more-than 120-year history, the Bulldogs have won 21 individual national championships, 30 regular season conference championships, and 1 national championship title. The school is noted for a pervasive baseball fan culture, with Dudy Noble Field holding 22 of the top 25 all-time NCAA attendance records and the school's Left Field Lounge being described as an epicenter of college baseball.

== Events ==
The Mississippi State Fair is Mississippi's primary agricultural fair.

== Museums ==
The Mississippi Agriculture and Forestry Museum is in Jackson, Mississippi. Mississippi Pickle Fest, a festival dedicated to pickled cucumbers, is held at the Mississippi Agriculture and Forestry Museum.

== See also ==
- Agriculture in Louisiana
- List of plantations in Mississippi
- Delta and Providence Cooperative Farms
- Cotton Belt
