= Ozark Mountain AVA =

American Viticultural Area in Arkansas, Missouri, and Oklahoma

Coordinates: 37°19′52″N 93°24′12″W

Ozark Mountain
- Wine region
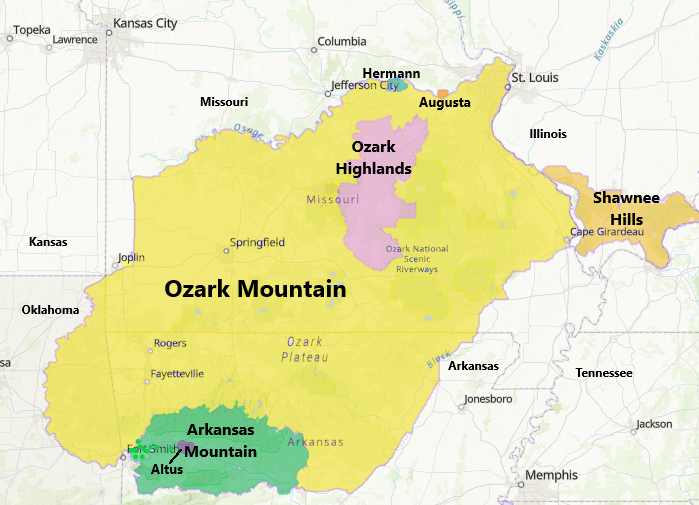
- Type: American Viticultural Area
- Year established: 1986
- Country: United States
- Part of: Arkansas, Missouri, Oklahoma
- Sub-regions: Altus AVA, Arkansas Mountain AVA, Hermann AVA, Ozark Highlands AVA
- Growing season: 213 days
- Climate region: Humid subtropical/continental
- Precipitation (annual average): 38 to 50 in (970–1,270 mm)
- Soil conditions: Clay from deeply weathered, consolidated sedimentary and weathered volcanic rocks
- Total area: 35.2 million acres (55,000 sq mi)
- Size of planted vineyards: 4,280 acres (1,730 ha)
- Grapes produced: Catawba, Chambourcin, Chardonel, Concord, Norton, St. Vincent, Vidal blanc, Vignoles, Villard noir
- No. of wineries: 40

Ozark Mountain is an American Viticultural Area (AVA) located in northwest Arkansas, southern Missouri, and northeast Oklahoma and the sixth largest AVA, encompassing 35.2 million acres (55,000 sq mi). The wine appellation was established as the nation's 86^{th}, Oklahoma's initial, Arkansas' second and Missouri's third AVA on July 2, 1986 by the Bureau of Alcohol, Tobacco and Firearms (ATF), Treasury after reviewing the petition submitted by Mr. Al Wiederkehr of Wiederkehr Wine Cellars in Altus, Arkansas, on behalf of himself and local vintners proposing a viticultural area in southern Missouri, northern Arkansas, and northeastern Oklahoma named "Ozark Mountain." At the outset, there were about 4,280 acres (1,730 ha) under vine with approximately 35 wineries. As of 2025, there are four established appellations within its boundary that recognizes distinct regions whose climate, vineyard soil and growing conditions define unique viticulture areas.

== History ==
This area has been referred to as the "Ozark Mountain" region in many geographical books, including Natural Regions of the United States and Canada by Charles B. Hunt and The Ozarks by Richard Rhodes. Wine labels from Wiederkehr Wine Cellars and others have borne the ATF approved appellation "Ozark Mountain" since as far back as 1959. The Ozark Mountain area is well known as a wine making region, as is shown by this quote: "Like all of the other American wine regions, the Ozarks [Mountains] are quietly seething with new ideas, new personalities, new grape varieties and a new sense of direction."

The growing of grapes is well suited to the climate and soils of the Ozarks. Viticulture was introduced early and was an important step toward the success of the German settlements at Hermann, Missouri. In 1845 there were fifty-thousand vines in the vicinity of Hermann, and by 1849 the number had grown to seven hundred thousand. The success of grapes at Hermann led to extensive plantings of vineyards at Ste. Genevieve, Missouri and Boonville, Missouri and in Franklin, Warren, and St. Charles counties. In the 1880s, Catholic Swiss-Germans settled near Altus, Arkansas, on the extreme southern border of the Ozarks. They planted grapes on limestone soils in the Boston Mountain foothills overlooking the Arkansas Valley. The wines became quite popular in central Arkansas, and in recent years, Wiederkehr Wine Cellars has gained a national reputation for its products established by their forefather. Grapes also were grown by Italian immigrants who located in two widely separated Ozark communities. Both settlements, Tontitown in Washington County, Arkansas, and Rosati in eastern Phelps County, Missouri, were colonized in 1898 under the leadership of an Italian-born priest. The members of these colonies were fleeing from an ill-fated philanthropic colonization venture in southeastern Arkansas, where malaria had decimated their ranks. One reason for selecting the Ozarks locations was their suitability for growing grapes. Then, too, the Ozarks reminded them of their homeland in Italy, and the region was free of malaria. The rise of the grape industry at Tontitown was rapid. The place held no importance for vineyards in 1900, but by 1920, Washington County, with 150,000 vines, had become the chief vineyard county in Arkansas. Similar expansion, albeit on a smaller scale, occurred at Rosati, Missouri and wineries flourished at the two colonies until Prohibition days. During the 1920s the Welch Company established several large vineyards in Washington and Benton counties to supply its new grape-juice plant in Springdale. By 1923 the company had sponsored the planting of five thousand acres (2,000 ha), of which one thousand (400) were along the Kansas City Southern Railway between the Arkansas-Missouri line and Siloam Springs.
During the 1930s and 1940s, grape production declined throughout the Ozarks. This may be attributed to many of the same factors that caused reduction in orcharding and truck farming: labor shortages, drought, and marketing problems. In recent years, viticulture has received a boost from the increasing popularity of wines as opposed to more robust beverages. The Stone Hill Winery at Hermann, Missouri, has reopened and the Maifest and Oktoberfest celebrated there have attracted attention to the excellent wines of the district. Plantings of Catawba and other grapes have increased, and the winery buys surpluses from the Rosati district to meet the demand for wine. New wineries have been established at St. James and Rosati. Most of the grapes in southwest Missouri and northwest Arkansas are grown under contract with the Welch's grape juice cannery at Springdale, Arkansas. Grapes are grown in the vicinity of Exeter, Missouri, and at other locations near the Arkansas border.

== Terroir ==
=== Geography ===
The viticultural area is distinguished geographically from the surrounding areas. In his book, The Ozarks, Richard Rhodes states, as quoted in the petition:

Stretching from the forests of southern Missouri outside St. Louis through northern Arkansas to the Oklahoma plains near Tulsa, the 55,000 square miles (35,000,000 acres) of the Ozarks are bounded by five major rivers: The Mississippi, the Missouri, the Osage, the Neosho, and the Arkansas. The Ozark highlands, the only extensive elevated area in the United States between the Appalachians and the Rocky Mountains, consist of low mountains and hills shaped by spring fed streams and rivers...cutting their way through the elevated bedrock...... These boundaries do not merely locate the Ozarks on the map, but also serve to isolate some of the region's plant and animal life... The Ozarks mark the farthest western extension of the great deciduous forest that once covered the eastern United States. Their western border is the beginning of the prairie that runs from Western Missouri to the Rockies and from Texas to Canada. Their northern border, the Missouri River, is about as far south as the glacier of the ice age came... And the hot, lush alluvial lands of the Mississippi begin at the Ozarks' abrupt southeastern edge, in the Missouri Bootheel. With four different climatic regions pressing against them, the Ozarks serve as a sanctuary for a selection of plants and animals from all sides...

Most of the land remains forested, as it was before the arrival of civilization, in contrast to the neighboring plains country.

=== Climate ===
The primary effect which the mountainous terrain has on the climate of the Ozarks is to divide the region into innumerable small microclimatic, temperature zones. This is demonstrated by the following quote from Milton D. Rafferty in The Ozarks, Land and Life;

Within the Ozarks, temperatures will vary widely with the orientation of slope, nature of surface materials, relief, and presence of water. South and west-facing slopes receive the greatest amount of sunlight and are subject to higher rates of evaporation... In winter, perhaps the most noticeable effect of temperature differences within a small area is the duration of snow and icicles on the north-facing slopes. Air drainage creates the most readily observed temperature differences in summer. Nights are notable for the cool breeze that drains down the slopes, beginning an hour or two before sunset... ... As a rule, frosts occur in the valleys several weeks earlier in fall and later in spring than they do on the uplands, especially in the case of the larger valleys lying in the hill regions. The margins of the uplands have the best air drainage and are least subject to frosts.

Ozark viticulturists rely on their knowledge of local microclimatic conditions to select the best sites for their vineyards. Such sites possess generally similar conditions of soil and climate, thus giving Ozark viticulture a distinctive character. Favorable conditions for viticulture can be found at locations throughout the Ozarks, from Hermann in the north to Altus and Paris in the south. The reason for this is summarized succinctly by Rafferty: "The growing of grapes is well suited to the climate and soils of the Ozarks." The USDA plant hardiness zones range from 6a to 8a.

=== Soil ===
Geologically, the Ozarks are regarded as an upland plateau, in which mountains and valleys have been carved out by numerous streams and rivers. The land is hilly to mountainous, and the soils are characteristically stony and well-drained. The distinctive soil of the Ozark region is "Clay from deeply weathered, well consolidated sedimentary and deeply weathered volcanic rocks."
