= Dahlonega Plateau AVA =

American Viticultural Area in Georgia

Coordinates: 34°36′53″N 83°52′28″W

Dahlonega Plateau
- Wine region
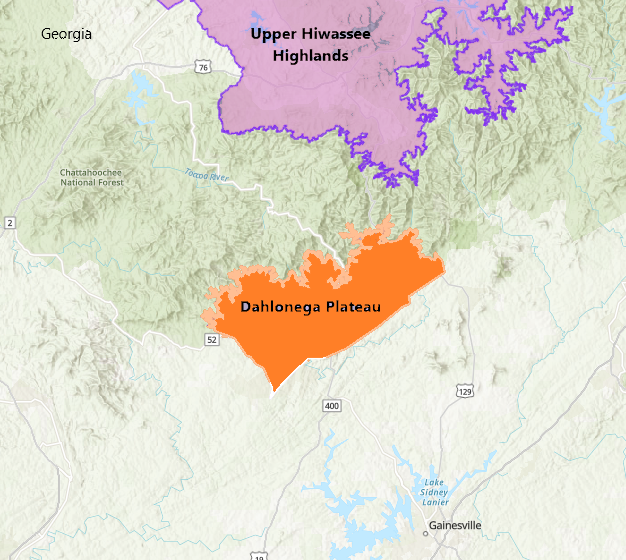
- Type: American Viticultural Area
- Year established: 2018
- Years of wine industry: 34
- Country: United States
- Part of: Georgia
- Other regions in Georgia: Upper Hiwassee Highlands AVA
- Growing season: 190-200 days
- Climate region: Region III-IV
- Heat units: 1503-3100 GDD
- Precipitation (annual average): 62.34 in (1,583.44 mm)
- Soil conditions: Derived from muscovite, schists, metasandstones, calcareous, muscovite quartzite, aluminous schist, gneisses
- Total area: 133 sq mi (85,120 acres)
- Size of planted vineyards: 110 acres (45 ha)
- No. of vineyards: 9
- Grapes produced: Cabernet Franc, Cabernet Sauvignon, Chardonnay, Norton(Cynthiana), Merlot, Muscadine, Pinot Blanc, Pinot Noir, Riesling, Sangiovese, Touriga Nacional, Vidal Blanc
- No. of wineries: 7

Dahlonega Plateau (/dəˈlɒnɪɡə/ də-LON-ig-ə) is an American Viticultural Area (AVA) located in the state of Georgia's northern region across portions of Lumpkin and White Counties. The wine appellation was established on July 29, 2018 as the nation's 242^{nd} and the state's second AVA by the Alcohol and Tobacco Tax and Trade Bureau (TTB) Treasury after reviewing the petition submitted by Amy Booker, president of the Dahlonega–Lumpkin Chamber & Visitors Bureau, on behalf of the Vineyard and Winery Operators of the Dahlonega Region of Northern Georgia group, proposing the establishment of the AVA to be designated "Dahlonega Plateau."

Dahlonega Plateau derives its name from a long, narrow, northeast-southwest trending plateau in the northern foothills of the Georgia Piedmont known as the Dahlonega Plateau. The plateau covers most of Lumpkin, Dawson, White, Pickens and Cherokee Counties. However, the AVA is limited to the northeastern portion of the plateau, in Lumpkin and White Counties, due to a lack of viticulture in the southwestern region of the plateau, as well topographical and climatic differences. Dahlonega Plateau viticultural area encompasses approximately 133 sq mi (85,120 acres) and is not a sub-region within another AVA. The petition noted that presently there are 7 wineries and 8 commercial vineyards with approximately 110 acres (45 ha) of cultivation and expansion plans of additional 12 acres (5 ha) in the next few years.

== History ==
The Dahlonega region holds an important role in Georgia’s history as the primary location of the first gold rush in 1829. And because of this, the name Dahlonega is derived from the Cherokee word "dalanigei" meaning “yellow money” or “gold.” Wine-making in the region was active in the 19th century when Georgia was a leader in growing the Muscadine grape—a variety native to the southeastern U.S. that thrives well in the warm climate. However, the Temperance movement also progressed throughout the 19th century gaining prominent political power by the turn of the century. In 1907, Georgia was the first Southern state to ban the production, transportation, and sale of alcohol. Prohibition in Georgia lasted until 1935, two years after the repeal of the Eighteenth Amendment and the end of Prohibition. It was in the mid-1990s when modern vineyards in the Dahlonega area were established to cultivate European, French-hybrid and American wine grape varieties.

== Terroir ==
=== Topography ===
The distinguishing features of the Dahlonega Plateau AVA are its topography and climate. According to the petition, the distinctive topography of the AVA is due to the underlying geology, which consists of layers of rocks that weather uniformly and are moderately resistant to erosion. Over time, wind and water have gradually worn down the underlying rocks and formed a gently rolling landscape with an average elevation of approximately 1,554 ft (474 m) above sea level. The resulting broad, rounded hilltops separated by wide valleys have moderate slope angles and adequate sunlight for the cultivation of vineyards. By contrast, the petition states that the topography of the regions surrounding the AVA are less suitable for vineyards. The Blue Ridge Mountains and Hightower Ridges to the north, east, and southeast of the AVA generally have higher elevations and narrow valleys that are often shadowed by the surrounding steep, high slopes. The steep, high slopes allow less light to reach any vineyard planted on the valley floors, when compared to vineyards planted in the AVA. The steepness of the slopes would also make mechanical cultivation of any vineyard planted on the sides of the mountains impractical. In the lower elevations of the regions to the south and west of the AVA, the cool air draining from higher elevations eventually settles and pools and would increase the risk of frost damage in any vineyard planted there.

=== Climate ===
The petition for the Dahlonega Plateau AVA provided climate information including length of the growing season, growing degree day accumulations, and precipitation amounts from within the AVA and the surrounding regions. According to the petition, the Dahlonega Plateau AVA has a mean growing season length of 195 days. Over 60 percent of the terrain within the AVA has a growing season length in the range of 190 to 200 days. The petition cited a publication by the College of Agriculture and Life Sciences at Cornell University in conjunction with the Institute for the Application of Geospatial Technology, which states that sites with growing seasons between 190 and 200 days are ‘‘not limited by growing season’’ because most grape varietals will be able to ripen within 200 days, while sites with growing seasons shorter than 160 days are not recommended for vineyards because most grape varietals would not have time to ripen fully. Based on this guidance, the petition proposes that the vineyard owners can plant many different grape varietals in the majority of the AVA without the fear of having too short of a growing season for the grapes to ripen. The petition also provided the growing season lengths for the areas surrounding the AVA. The regions to the north and northeast each have a mean growing season of 164 days. Regions to the west and south, have growing seasons of 201 and 203 to 205 days, respectively. The AVA has a higher percentage of terrain with a growing season length between 190 and 200 days than all surrounding areas except the Hightower Ridges to the east, where approximately 76 percent of the terrain is within this range of growing season lengths.

Although growing season length is important because it reflects the number of frost-free days, the temperatures that are reached during that frost-free period are just as important to viticulture. The petition further stated that grape vines do not grow and fruit does not mature when temperatures are below 50 °F (10 °C). Therefore, a region that has a 180-day frost-free growing season would still be unsuitable for viticulture if temperatures seldom or never rise above 50 °F (10 °C). The petition presented growing degree days (GDD) data using the Winkler scale from the very cool Zone I, for regions accumulating 2,500 or fewer GDDs in a growing season, to the very warm Zone V, for regions accumulating over 4,000 GDDs. The data showed that the terrain within the Dahlonega Plateau AVA is classified in the intermediate ranges of the Winkler scale (Zones III and IV). The AVA has a higher percentage of terrain within Zone IV than any of the surrounding regions and lacks any terrain in the very cool Zone I, the cool Zone II, or the very warm Zone V. The petition indicated, that regions classified as Zones III or IV, such as the AVA, are suitable for growing a diverse range of late-ripening grape varietals.

According to the petition, the rising elevations of the Dahlonega Plateau AVA and the regions to the north and east cause the moisture-laden winds traveling inland from the Gulf of Mexico and Atlantic Ocean to drop their rain in the area. Annual rainfall amounts within the AVA are approximately 62 in (1,575 mm) per year and 17 in (432 mm) during the winter months. The regions to the north and east generally receive more rainfall annually and during winter than the AVA, and the regions to the south and west generally receive less. The petition stated that the AVA receives adequate annual rainfall amounts, which make vineyard irrigation seldom necessary. Furthermore, the petition provides data collected from the AVA and surrounding regions shows that the low winter rainfall amounts within the AVA are relevant to viticulture because, when compared to the data from the surrounding regions, low levels of rain in winter in the AVA reduce the possibility of a delayed bud break and subsequent later harvest. The USDA plant hardiness zones are 7b and 8a.

== Viticulture ==
An hour's drive north of Atlanta, Dahlonega Plateau is one of two American viticultural areas in the state with the other being the multi-state Upper Hiwassee Highlands which extends across the border into North Carolina. The region cultivates over 100 acres (40 ha) of grapes, including European, French-hybrid and American varieties with its nine vineyards, six wineries and a dozen tasting rooms.

The recognition of Georgia wines has grown as its vintages have received high praise and awards. “Wineries have exploded everywhere!” Sharon Paul excitedly proclaims, co-founder of Three Sisters winery. “Not just here in Dahlonega, but Upper Hiwassee Highlands AVA as well. And more tasting rooms come online every year. The more the merrier!”
