= Altus AVA =

American Viticultural Area in Arkansas

Coordinates: 35°27′24″N 93°45′35″W

Altus
- Wine region
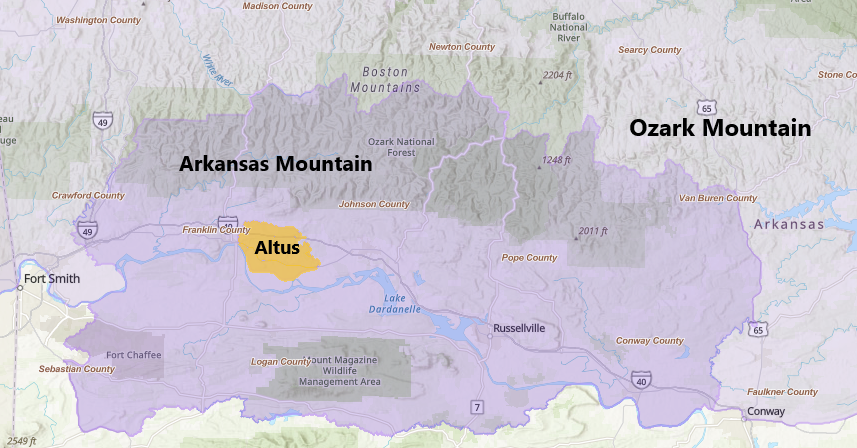
- Type: American Viticultural Area
- Year established: 1984
- Years of wine industry: 146
- Country: United States
- Part of: Arkansas, Ozark Mountain AVA, Arkansas Mountain AVA
- Growing season: 213+ days
- Climate region: Humid subtropical
- Precipitation (annual average): 45 inches (1,100 mm)
- Soil conditions: fine to gravelly in texture, sandy to silty loam, and slightly to strongly acidic
- Total area: 12,000–13,000 acres (19–20 sq mi)
- Size of planted vineyards: 800 acres (320 ha)
- Grapes produced: Cabernet Sauvignon, Chardonnay, Kerner, Müller-Thurgau, Muscadine, Niagara, Oraniensteiner, Scheurebe, Vignoles
- No. of wineries: 5

Altus is an American Viticultural Area (AVA) located in the Arkansas River Valley in Arkansas near the town of Altus in Franklin County. It was established as the nation's 65^{th} and the state's initial wine appellation on May 30, 1984 by the Bureau of Alcohol, Tobacco and Firearms (ATF), Treasury after reviewing the petition submitted by Mr. Matthew J. Post, of the Post Winery, on behalf of himself and local vintners, proposing a viticultural area to be named "Altus."

In 1986, the 12,000–13,000-acre (19–20 sq mi) area became a sub-appellation within the Arkansas Mountain AVA, which is also entirely within the larger multi-state Ozark Mountain AVA. The soils are fine to gravelly in texture, sandy to silty loam, and slightly to strongly acidic. These types of soil are particularly suited to viticulture. As of 2008, five wineries in the area produce nearly 1 million US gallons (3,800,000 L) of wine per year.

== History ==
The city of Altus, and its surrounding hills and valleys, were first planted in grapes by Catholic Swiss-Germans who settled in the area around 1880. The parish priest, Rev. Placidus Oechsle, O.S.B., pastor from 1897 to 1935, recalls these days in a historical sketch he wrote in 1930:

Some of our pioneers came from winemaking countries, and started to plant vineyards. Grape-growing became a very profitable industry, and Altus was soon famous for its g0od wine. Our grape festivals are an attraction for thousands of visitors ......After many years of experimenting with hundreds of varieties, only a few proved commercially valuable. Today, mostly Campbell's Early, Delaware, Niagara, Brighton, and Banner, and a few others are cultivated for market ......The grapes of Altus are famous, and are shipped all over the country.

The stationery of the local farmers' club, along with bumper plates used on the first automobiles in town, gave notice of the area's grape- growing ability. Mr. Joseph Bachmann, a Swiss horticulturist, conducted many experiments which Rev. Placidus refers to. He was visited by Luther Burbank, and T. V. Munson, other noted horticulturists of the time, and was praised for his work. Experimentation continues today by both local vineyard owners and the University of Arkansas in Fayetteville, which often uses Altus area vineyards to conduct tests. In recent years, Altus has become a stopover for thousands of tourists annually, who come to visit the wineries and attend the festivals. Currently, Altus is known as the "Wine Capitol of Arkansas" as evidenced on the official stationery of the city. The wines of the Altus region have won awards both nationally and internationally.

== Terroir ==
=== Topography ===
The principle viticultural area in use at this time is on top of St. Mary's Mountain, also known as Pond Creek Mountain; it has been referred to as "the cradle of Altus, the village known for its wine." It is a plateau extending approximately five miles (8.0 km) east to west, and approximately three and a half miles (5.6 km) north to south, at elevations between 800 and 900 feet (240–270 m). Other vineyards are located around the mountain at elevations of 500 and 700 feet (150–210 m). Presently there are approximately 800 acres (320 ha) of grapes under cultivation in the area surrounding Altus.

=== Climate ===
The climate of the Altus area is significantly affected by several geographic features which distinguish it from surrounding areas. The ridges of the Boston Mountains to the north provide a barrier against the penetration of cold air from the north in the winter, and the Arkansas River Valley traps warm air in the summer. Nearby Ozark, (elevation 400 feet) has an average of 213 frost-free growing days a year. It has been observed that growers in the hills around Altus enjoy additional frost-free growing days because the colder air sinks to the river valley, and forces warmer air into the hills in the early spring and late fall. Approximately 45 in (1,100 mm) of rainfall yearly provides plentiful moisture, so that irrigation is not always necessary. The plant hardiness zones are 7b and 8a.

=== Soil ===
The soils in the Altus region are made up of materials weathered from sandstone, which is the basic structure of the Boston Mountain range. Soils are fine to gravelly in texture, sandy to silty loams, and slightly to strongly acidic. Soil depth is one to four feet (0.30–1.22 m), usually ending with a bedrock of sandstone. The natural acidity comes from the constant leaching of the sandstone bedrock, and is periodically balanced by adding lime. The only part of Arkansas in which this soil type, known as the Linker Mountainburg association, is found, is along the edge of the Boston Mountains.
