= Agriculture in Louisiana =

Agriculture is an important part of the economy, history, and culture of the American state of Louisiana. Beginning with the settling of the land by Native Americans organized cultivation of the land and the raising of livestock has occurred in Louisiana through the colonial, plantation, and early modern periods to the present.

== History ==
The Mississippian period in Louisiana was when the Plaquemine and the Caddoan Mississippian cultures developed, and the peoples adopted extensive maize agriculture, cultivating different strains of the plant by saving seeds, selecting for certain characteristics, etc. The Plaquemine culture in the lower Mississippi River Valley in western Mississippi and eastern Louisiana began in 1200 and continued to about 1600. Examples in Louisiana include the Medora site, the archaeological type site for the culture in West Baton Rouge Parish whose characteristics helped define the culture, the Atchafalaya Basin Mounds in St. Mary Parish, the Fitzhugh Mounds in Madison Parish, the Scott Place Mounds in Union Parish, and the Sims site in St. Charles Parish.

In the early decades of the 20th century, thousands of African Americans left Louisiana in the Great Migration north to industrial cities for jobs and education, and to escape Jim Crow society and lynchings. The boll weevil infestation and agricultural problems cost many sharecroppers and farmers their jobs. The mechanization of agriculture also reduced the need for laborers.

Strawberry workers near Hammond playing poker in a workers' bunkhouse, 1939.

Many African Americans left the state in the Second Great Migration, from the 1940s through the 1960s to escape social oppression and seek better jobs. The mechanization of agriculture in the 1930s had sharply cut the need for laborers. They sought skilled jobs in the defense industry in California, better education for their children, and living in communities where they could vote.

In the 21st century farmers have experimented with advanced technologies like artificial intelligence to improve their operations.

== Major crops ==
=== Sugarcane ===
Historically, sugar production was important in the growth of slavery in Louisiana. Sugarcane was first planted in New Orleans in 1751 by French Jesuit priests. After Étienne de Boré introduced sugar refining to Louisiana in 1795, sugarcane production in Louisiana expanded dramatically; practically all Louisiana sugar was grown on plantations using slave labor.

In the first half of the 19th century, the output of the Louisiana sugar industry increased substantially. By the 1840s, Louisiana produced between 25% and 50% of sugar consumed in the US but it was far from the World's biggest producer, which was Cuba. The American Civil War paralyzed the sugarcane industry in Louisiana, causing a decline in output from 177,000 tons in 1855 to 5,000 tons in 1865. By 1875, the output had risen to 60,000 tons.

In the 21st century sugarcane production in Louisiana has been largely confined to the Mississippi River Delta, where soils are fertile and the climate is warm. However, the sugar industry in Louisiana has expanded northward and westward into nontraditional sugarcane growing areas. Most of the expansion in sugarcane acreage has occurred when returns for competing crops, such as rice and soybeans, have decreased. Louisiana production has also expanded because of the adoption of high-yielding sugarcane varieties, along with investments in new harvesting combines.

== Specialty crops ==
=== Figs ===
Fig production is significant but mostly takes place on a small scale, historically most homesteads would have had a fig tree and today fig trees are among the most common fruit trees found in Louisiana yards and small orchards. Louisiana State University has a significant fig breeding program.

=== Tobacco ===
==== Perique ====
Perique (/pəˈriːk/) is a type of tobacco from Grand Point, Louisiana (St James Parish), known for its strong, powerful, and fruity aroma. When the Acadians made their way into this region in 1776, the Choctaw and Chickasaw tribes were cultivating a variety of tobacco with a distinctive flavor. A farmer named Pierre Chenet is credited with first turning this local tobacco into what is now known as Perique in 1824 through the labor-intensive technique of pressure-fermentation. It is reported by John C. Leffingwell, PhD, an authority on tobacco, that Perique is based on a variety of Red Burley (USDA Type 72) leaf. The Tobacco Institute says perique has been shipped out of New Orleans for more than 250 years and is considered to be one of America's first export crops.

=== Wine grapes ===
Louisiana wine refers to wine made from grapes grown in the U.S. state of Louisiana. Growing grapes in Louisiana is challenging which has hindered its wine industry. The climate of Louisiana is extremely hot and humid, and viticulturists in the state face Pierce's disease, powdery mildew, and other grapevine diseases. There are four commercial wineries in Louisiana that collectively produce about 20,000 U.S. gallons (76,000 liters) of wine per year.

== See also ==
- 1811 German Coast uprising
- Agriculture in Mississippi
- American Sugar Refining
- Benjamin Laurent Millaudon
- Cajun cuisine
- Cuisine of New Orleans
- Cotton Belt
- History of slavery in Louisiana
- Tabasco sauce
- Louisiana Agricultural Finance Authority
- Louisiana Creole cuisine
- Louisiana Farm Bureau Federation
- List of plantations in Louisiana
- Sugar industry of the United States
- This Week in Louisiana Agriculture
- Thibodaux massacre
- William Kenner
- P. M. Lapice
