= Georgia (U.S. state) wine =

Wine from the U.S. state of Georgia

Georgia
- Wine region
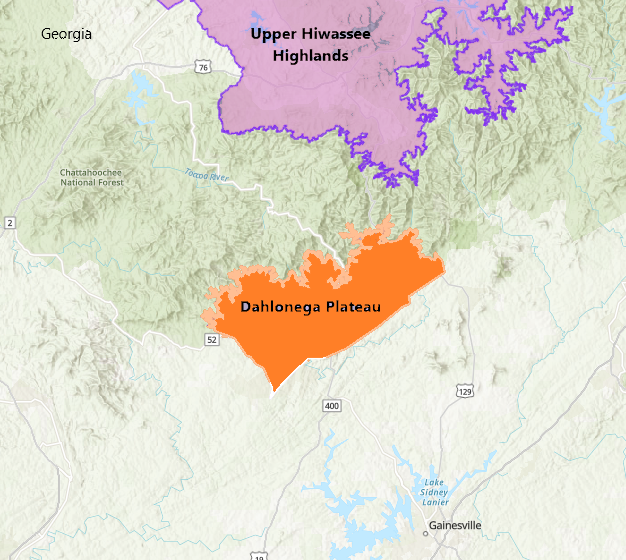
- Georgia's AVAs
- Official name: State of Georgia
- Type: U.S. State Appellation
- Year established: 1788
- Years of wine industry: 133
- Country: United States
- Sub-regions: Dahlonega Plateau AVA, Upper Hiwassee Highlands AVA
- Climate region: Region I-IV
- Heat units: 1503-3100 GDD
- Total area: 36.8 million acres (57,513 sq mi)
- Grapes produced: Albariño, Cabernet Franc, Cabernet Sauvignon, Carlos, Catawba, Cayuga, Chambourcin, Chardonel, Chardonnay, Concord, De Chaunac, Gewürztraminer, Malbec, Marsanne, Merlot, Mourvedre, Muscadine, Niagara, Noble, Norton, Petit Manseng, Pinot blanc, Pinot gris, Pinot noir, Riesling, Roussanne, Sangiovese, Scarlet, Scuppernong, Seyval blanc, Syrah, Tannat, Touriga Nacional, Vidal blanc, Viognier

Georgia wine refers to where wine grapes are cultivated and harvested in the U.S. state appellation of Georgia. State names in the United States automatically qualify as legal appellations of origin for wine produced from grapes grown in that state and do not require registration with the Alcohol and Tobacco Tax and Trade Bureau (TTB) of the Treasury Department. TTB was created in January 2003, when the Bureau of Alcohol, Tobacco and Firearms, or ATF, was extensively reorganized under the provisions of the Homeland Security Act of 2002.

Georgia is the national leader in the production of wine from the Muscadine grape, a variety native to the southeastern United States that thrives well in the warm climate. Wine-making was active in the 19th century when Georgia, by 1900, ranked sixth in wine production among U.S. states.
However, the Temperance movement also progressed throughout the 1800s gaining prominent political power in the early 20th century. In 1907, Georgia was the first Southern state to ban the production, transportation and sale of alcohol with prohibition enacted until 1935, two years after the repeal of the Eighteenth Amendment and the end of Prohibition. Consequently, Georgia's wine industry was decimated until the 1980s when modern vineyards were established to cultivate European, French-hybird and American wine grape varieties.

In 2014, the multi-state Upper Hiwassee Highlands, with its rich agricultural and cultural history at an average elevation of 2,000 feet (610 m) in the southern end of the Appalachian Mountain region, encompasses three counties in northwestern Georgia and across the border into two counties in southwestern North Carolina toward the Tennessee stateline, was recognized as the state's initial American Viticultural Area (AVA). Four years later, Georgia's second AVA, Dahlonega Plateau, was formally established further south in the foothills of the Three Sisters Mountain about an hour's drive north of Atlanta. The recognition of Georgia wines has grown where its vintages have received high praise and awards. "Wineries have exploded everywhere!" Sharon Paul, co-founder of Three Sisters winery proclaims, "Not just here in Dahlonega, but Upper Hiwassee Highlands AVA as well. And more tasting rooms come online every year. The more the merrier!"
