= Alabama wine =

Alabama
- Wine region
- Official name: State of Alabama
- Type: U.S. state
- Year established: 1819; 207 years ago
- Country: United States
- Total area: 52,419 square miles (135,765 km^{2})
- Grapes produced: Cabernet Sauvignon, Cabernet Franc, Chambourcin, Chardonel, Chardonnay, Colombard, Merlot, Muscadine, Norton/Cynthiana, Vidal blanc
- No. of wineries: 15

Alabama wine production dates back to the 19th century. The wine industry in the U.S. state of Alabama experienced significant growth in 2002 after agricultural reforms lifted restrictions on wineries. Most wine producers in the state cultivate French hybrid grapes and the Muscadine grape varieties, which grow well in Alabama's humid climate. Many attempts in Alabama's history have been made to grow Vitis vinifera grapes, however, they are susceptible to Pierce's disease. Unlike many other wine producing regions, Alabama currently has no designated American Viticultural Areas.

== History ==
=== Early French attempt: Vine and Olive Colony ===
Wine production in Alabama is traced to the early 19th century and the establishment of the Vine and Olive Colony, a French settlement that has become part of Alabama's early wine lore. Often described in romanticized terms of a settlement founded by French military aristocrats exiled from Napoleon's army, granted land, and founded the colony at the confluence of the Tombigbee and Black Warrior Rivers in 1817.

The real project in 1816 was proposed by Jean-Simon Chaudron, editor of Philadelphia's French Newspaper, Abeille Americaine. The U.S. Congress approved the settlement as part of an effort to strengthen control over the Gulf Coast and promote a domestic winemaking industry, independent from European imports. The settlers were granted 92,000 acres and a 14-year grace period to establish grape and olive production before repayment for the land was required.

Most settlers were French immigrants or refugees from Haiti, and many lacked any real agricultural experience. The grapevines brought from Europe failed to survive the voyage, and Alabama's climate was not suitable to the European grape varieties. The French settlers recorded a blight that killed the vinifera grapes they attempted to grow, later identified as Pierce's disease.

Unable to successfully sustain grape or olive cultivation, the colony shifted their focus to cotton, which grew in abundance. By the 1830s, most of the vineyards had been converted to cotton plantations, the original settlers had largely dissolved.

=== Modern era ===
Alabama now has several wine tours of its various wineries. Alabama has approximately 12 wineries, which are known for producing muscadine wine and fruit wines. In North Alabama, the North Alabama Wine Trail is a trail that connects six wineries located south of the Appalachian Mountains.

Wineries on the North Alabama Wine Trail:

- Wills Creek Winery (Attalla)
- Jules J. Berta Winery (Albertville)
- Maraella Winery (Hokes Bluff)
- Fruithurst Winery Co. (Fruithurst)
- High Country Cellars (Heflin)
- Sipsey Vineyard & Winery (Cullman)

== Climate and geography ==
Most of the wineries in Alabama can be found in Northeast Alabama, near the Appalachian Mountains. This land provides ideal conditions for producing wine: mountainous terrain and an abundance of rain and sunshine. Alabama's climate is particularly advantageous for growing Muscadine grapes. The warm climate in Alabama allows wineries to stay open year-round for visitors.
