= Mississippi Delta AVA =

American Viticultural Area in Mississippi

Coordinates: 34°14′36″N 89°29′08″W

Mississippi Delta
- Wine region
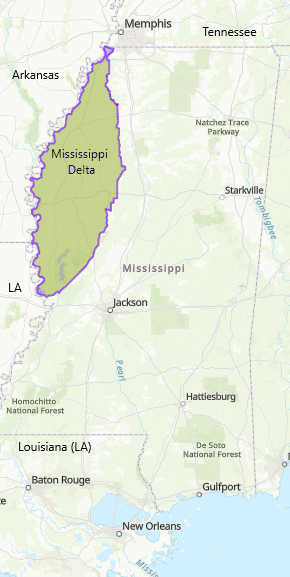
- Type: American Viticultural Area
- Year established: 1984
- Country: United States
- Part of: Louisiana, Mississippi, Tennessee
- Growing season: 230 days
- Climate region: Region V
- Heat units: 4,500 GDD units
- Precipitation (annual average): 36.28 inches (921.51 mm)
- Soil conditions: Sharkey, Dundee, Commerce, Alligator, Dubbs, Forestdale, Robinsonville, Tunica and Tutwiler
- Total area: 6,000 square miles (3,840,000 acres)
- Size of planted vineyards: 50 to 250 acres (20–101 ha)
- Grapes produced: Euvitis, Muscadine
- No. of wineries: 3

Mississippi Delta is an American Viticultural Area (AVA) on the left (east) bank of the Mississippi River, between Memphis, Tennessee, and Vicksburg, Mississippi. It includes portions of the Mississippi Delta landform and the watershed of the lower Mississippi River in the states of Louisiana (west bank), Mississippi, and Tennessee. The wine appellation was established as the nation's 68th and each state's initial AVA on August 30, 1984, by the Bureau of Alcohol, Tobacco and Firearms (ATF), Treasury after reviewing the petition submitted by Mr. Samuel H. Rushing, of The Winery Rushing, proposing the viticultural area in northwestern Mississippi, with minute segments in Tennessee and Louisiana, to be known as "Mississippi Delta."

The Mississippi Delta viticultural area is leaf-shaped and extends for a length of about 180 miles (290 km) with a maximum width of about 65 miles (105 km) encompassing approximately 3.8 million acres (6,000 sq mi). The area is a flat, alluvial plain with extremely rich soil. Topsoil in the area is often 35 feet (11 m) deep. The area is one of the more highly productive agricultural regions in the United States. Growing conditions are favorable to a wide variety of crops. Major crops are cotton, soybeans, grain, sorghum, and rice. To a much lesser extent, the area is also a grape-producing region. Estimates of vineyard acreage range from 50 to 250 acres (20–101 ha). There are vineyards dispersed through the area, and as of 2023, there are three operational wineries.

== Area Name ==
The term "delta" is commonly understood to mean a triangular area by the mouth of a river, formed by alluvial deposits. The Mississippi Delta is an exception to this, in that it is an area of alluvial deposits located several hundred miles above the mouth of the Mississippi River. However, according to the evidence the area is a true delta, for its deposits were first laid down in an prehistory era when the mouth of the Mississippi was much farther north. In more recent times, prior to the construction of the Mississippi River levee system, the area received periodic additional deposits whenever the Mississippi and/or Yazoo River flooded. Geologists sometimes call the area the "Yazoo Basin," since the area is primarily drained by the Yazoo River, but locally and in literature it is most commonly called the "Mississippi Delta," or just "The Delta."
Another smaller area near the mouth of the Mississippi River, south of New Orleans, is sometimes also called the "Mississippi Delta." However, no grapes are known to be grown in that area.

== History ==
Because of the danger of flooding, the area was sparsely settled until about 140 years ago, when the levee system began to make agriculture feasible there. Nevertheless, within the 20th century, the area has developed a considerable history and reputation under the name "Mississippi Delta." In the early 1900s prior to the Prohibition, grape-growing was profitable in the area, and in the late 20th century, the state of Mississippi invested millions of dollars in Mississippi State University's Enology Laboratory, located at Stoneville in the heart of the Delta region. This expenditure was based upon belief that the region will someday become "the grape producing area of the Southeast," according to a letter of support submitted by the petitioner from the head of that Laboratory. The few wineries in Mississippi Delta produce wine from the native Muscadine grapes. An impediment to the growth of Mississippi Delta's wine industry is the restrictive local alcohol laws in the state of Mississippi. Although Prohibition was enforced only from 1920 to 1933, the manufacture and sale of liquor was banned within the state from 1907 to 1966, and currently, almost half of Mississippi's counties are dry except within Mississippi Delta AVA.

== Terroir ==
The western boundary of the area is the levee system of the Mississippi River. West of that, the land is not suitable for agriculture because it is subject to unpredictable, periodic floods. The land that is not protected by the levee system is used primarily for sporting purposes, such as hunting and fishing. The eastern boundary of the area follows the very striking geographical feature known as the loess bluffs. These bluffs, which rise 100 feet (30 m) high along the entire eastern side if the Mississippi Delta, abruptly demarcate the change from alluvial soil to the windblown soil of the loess hills region. The division between the almost totally flat delta and the very hilly region east of the loess bluffs is dramatic and obvious to an observer. Because of its shape, the area comes to a point at its north and south ends. At Memphis and at Vicksburg, the loess bluffs come right down to the Mississippi River, thus isolating the Mississippi Delta totally between the bluffs to the east and the river to the west. Although sharply distinguishable from the areas immediately to the east and west, the Delta is almost totally homogeneous within the proposed boundaries. The land is flat, and the rivers and streams meander very slowly through shifting channels. When one of them changes course, it leaves behind a partially filled "ox-bow lake." There are no geographical features within the area with any viticultural significance that could be used as the basis for smaller viticultural areas within the Mississippi Delta. Growing degree-day (GDD) accumulations are 4,500 and Winkler Region is zone V. The region has a humid subtropical climate and the USDA plant hardiness zones range from 8a to 9a.
