= Louisiana wine =

Louisiana
- Wine region
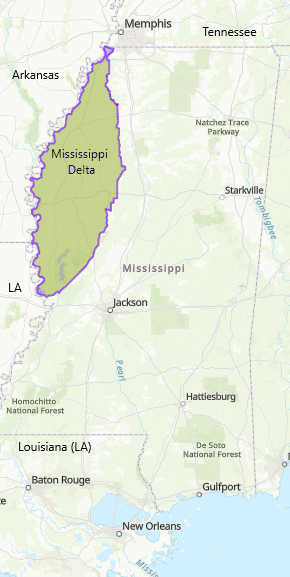
- Official name: State of Louisiana
- Type: U.S. state
- Year established: 1812
- Country: United States
- Sub-regions: Mississippi Delta AVA
- Climate region: Humid subtropical
- Total area: 33.2 million acres (51,885 sq mi)
- Grapes produced: Blanc du Bois, Muscadine, Niagara, Norton, Viognier
- No. of wineries: 6

Louisiana wine refers to wine made from grapes grown in the U.S. state of Louisiana. Growing grapes in Louisiana is challenging which has hindered its wine industry. The climate of Louisiana is extremely hot and humid, and viticulturists in the state face Pierce's disease, powdery mildew, and other grapevine diseases. There are four commercial wineries in Louisiana that collectively produce about 20,000 U.S. gallons (76,000 L) of wine per year.

== See also ==
- Mississippi Delta AVA
- Agriculture in Louisiana
