= Grape hull pie =

Dessert

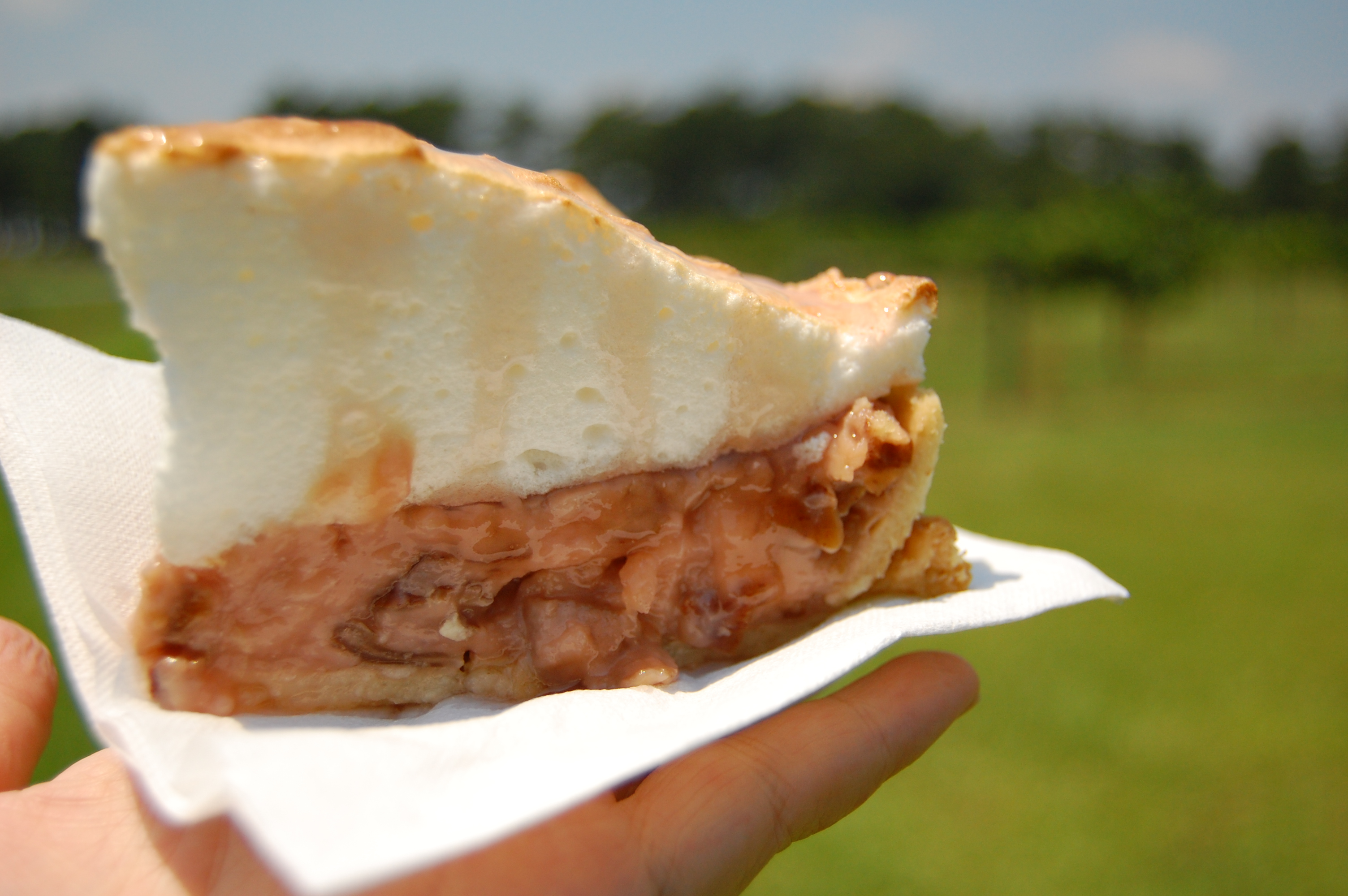
- Hull pie with meringue
- Type: Pie
- Course: Dessert
- Region or state: Southeastern United States
- Associated cuisine: Cuisine of the Southern United States

Grape hull pie, also called muscadine pie, is a dessert found in the cuisine of the Southern United States.

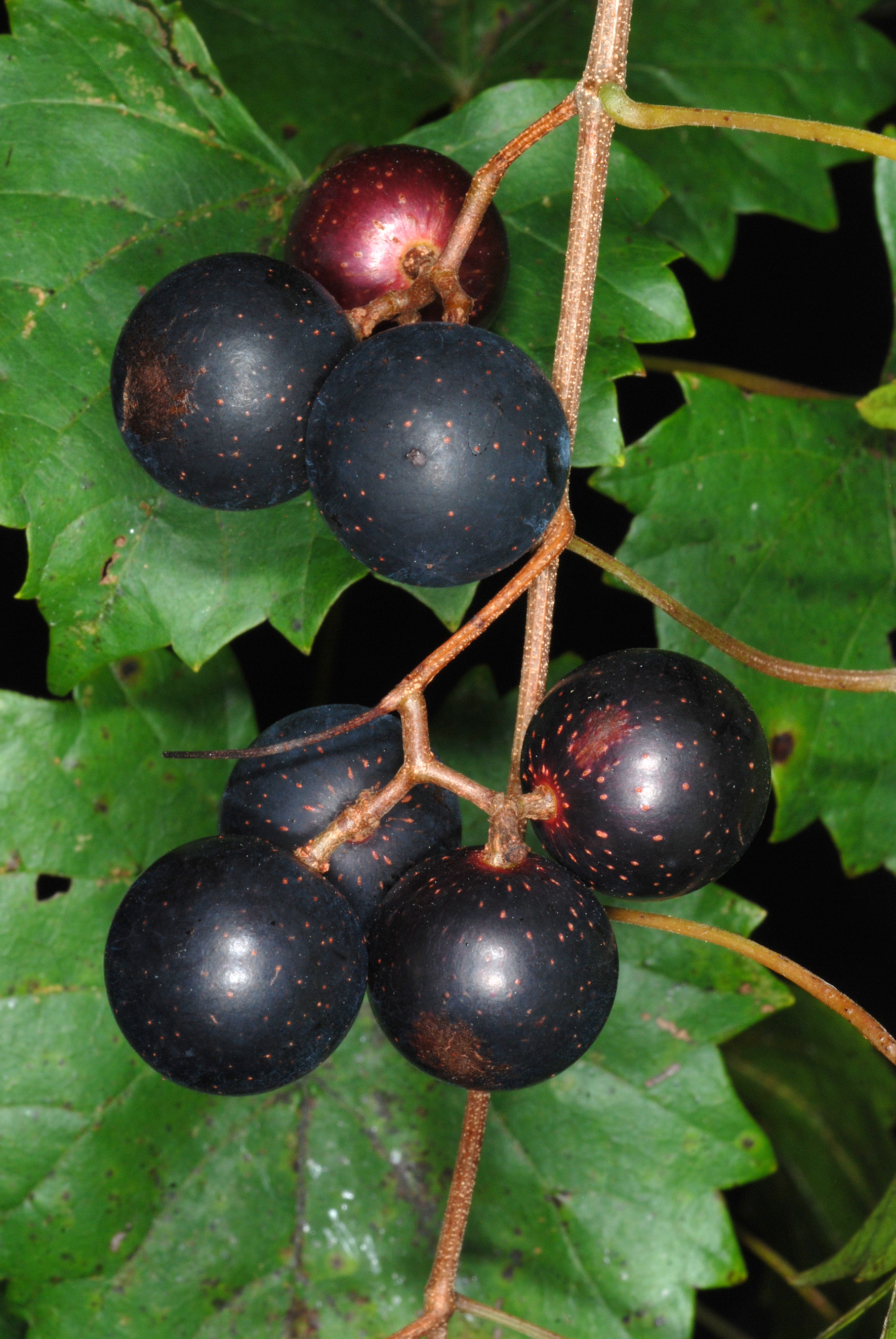
Muscadine grapes

The dish is traditionally made out of muscadine grapes, which are indigenous to the southeastern United States. Grape hull pie was created as a way to use the skins left over from preparing grape jelly instead of wasting them. It is commonly prepared in North Carolina where it is a part of traditional cuisine. Humorist Celia Rivenbark described her early memories of the dish in an essay for The Carolina Table.

The pie is prepared by simmering the skins, or "hulls", of muscadine grapes together with sugar, grape pulp and lemon juice. Seeds are removed from the mixture by straining or picking them out. The filling is then poured into a double pie crust and baked.
