= American wine =

Wine making in the United States of America

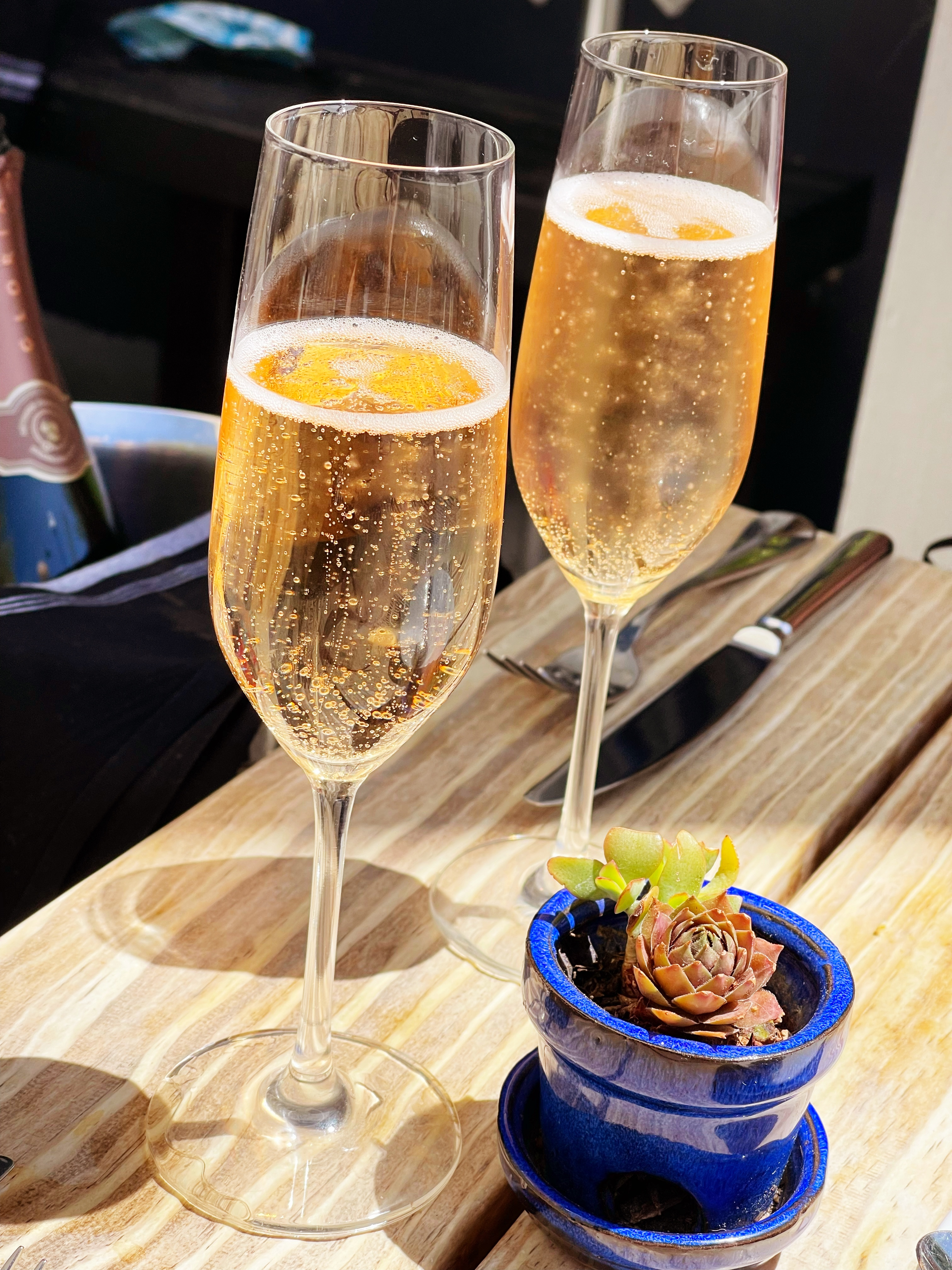
A California blanc de noir wine

Wine has been produced in the United States since the 1500s, with the first widespread production beginning in New Mexico in 1628. As of 2023, wine production is undertaken in all fifty states, with California producing 80.8% of all US wine. The North American continent is home to several native species of grape, including Vitis labrusca, Vitis riparia, Vitis rotundifolia, and Vitis vulpina, but the wine-making industry is based almost entirely on the cultivation of the European Vitis vinifera, which was introduced by European settlers. With more than 1,100,000 acres (4,500 km^{2}) under vine, the United States is the fourth-largest wine producing country in the world, after Italy, Spain, and France.

== History ==
The first Europeans to explore North America, a Viking expedition from Greenland, called it Vinland because of the profusion of grape vines they found. The earliest wine made in what is now the United States was produced between 1562 and 1564 by French Huguenot settlers from Scuppernong grapes at a settlement near Jacksonville, Florida. In the early American colonies of Virginia and the Carolinas, wine-making was an official goal laid out in the founding charters. However, settlers discovered that the wine made from the various native grapes had flavors which were unfamiliar and which they did not like.

This led to repeated efforts to grow the familiar European Vitis vinifera varieties, beginning with the Virginia Company exporting French vinifera vines with French vignerons to Virginia in 1619. These early plantings met with failure as native pest and vine disease ravaged the vineyards. In what would become the Southwestern United States the Spanish Kingdoms of Las Californias and Santa Fe de Nuevo México had missions that were planting vineyards, the traditions of which remain in the modern day California and New Mexico wine industries. New Mexico wine was developed first in 1629 – making it the oldest wine-producing region in the United States, and Mission grapes were being grown for California wine by 1680. In 1683, William Penn planted a vineyard of French vinifera in Pennsylvania; it may have interbred with a native Vitis labrusca vine to create the hybrid grape Alexander. One of the first commercial wineries in the United States was founded in 1787 by Pierre Legaux in Pennsylvania. A settler in Indiana in 1806 produced wine made from the Alexander grape. Today, French-American hybrid grapes are the staples of wine production on the East Coast of the United States.

On November 21, 1799, the Kentucky General Assembly passed a bill to establish a commercial vineyard and winery. The vinedresser for the vineyard was John James Dufour, formerly of Vevey, Switzerland. The vineyard was located overlooking the Kentucky River in Jessamine County in what is known as the bluegrass region in central Kentucky. Dufour named it First Vineyard on November 5, 1798. The vineyard's current address in 5800 Sugar Creek Pike, Nicholasville, Kentucky. The first wine from First Vineyard was consumed by subscribers to the vineyard at John Postelthwaite's house on March 21, 1803. Two 5-gallon oak casks of wine were taken to President Thomas Jefferson in Washington, D. C., in February 1805. The vineyard continued until 1809, when a killing freeze in May destroyed the crop and many vines. The Dufour family abandoned Kentucky, and migrated west to Vevay, Indiana, a center of a Swiss-immigrant community.

In California, the first major vineyard and winery was established in 1769 by the Franciscan missionary Junípero Serra near San Diego. Later missionaries carried vines northward; Sonoma's first vineyard was planted around 1805. California has two native grape varieties, but they make very poor quality wine. The California Wild Grape (Vitis californicus) does not produce wine-quality fruit, although it sometimes is used as rootstock for wine grape varieties.> The missionaries used the Mission grape. (In South America, this grape is known as criolla or "colonialized European".) Although a Vitis vinifera variety, it is a grape of "very modest" quality. Jean-Louis Vignes was one of the early settlers to use a higher quality vinifera in his vineyard near Los Angeles.

The first winery in the United States to become commercially successful was founded in Cincinnati, Ohio, in the mid-1830s by Nicholas Longworth. He made a sparkling wine from Catawba grapes. By 1855, Ohio had 1500 acres in vineyards, according to travel writer Frederick Law Olmsted, who said it was more than in Missouri and Illinois, which each had 1100 acres in wine. German immigrants from the late 1840s had been instrumental in building the wine industry in those states.

In the 1860s, vineyards in the Ohio River Valley were attacked by black rot. This prompted several wine-makers to move north to the Finger Lakes region of western New York. During this time, the Missouri wine industry, centered on the German colony in Hermann, was expanding rapidly along both shores of the Missouri River west of St. Louis. By the end of the century, the state was second to California in wine production. In the late 19th century, the phylloxera epidemic in the West and Pierce's disease in the East ravaged the American wine industry.

Prohibition in the United States began when the state of Maine became the first state to go completely dry in 1846. Nationally, Prohibition was implemented after ratification by the states of the Eighteenth Amendment to the United States Constitution in 1920, which forbade the manufacturing, sale and transport of alcohol. Exceptions were made for sacramental wine used for religious purposes. Some wineries were able to maintain minimal production under those auspices, but most vineyards ceased operations. New Mexico was one such region, due to the region's long history of wine making and religious traditions, monks and nuns in New Mexico were able to save long-standing New Mexican sacramental and leisure wine grape lineages. Separate counties in the country resorted to bootlegging and home wine-making also became common, permitted exemptions for sacramental wines and personal home production.

Following the Repeal of Prohibition in 1933, operators tried to revive the American wine-making industry, which was nearly ended. Many talented wine-makers had died, vineyards had been neglected or replanted with table grapes, and Prohibition had changed Americans' taste in wines. During the Great Depression, consumers demanded cheap "jug wine" (so-called dago red) and sweet, fortified (high alcohol) wine. Before Prohibition, dry table wines outsold sweet wines by three to one, but afterward, the ratio of demand changed dramatically. As a result, by 1935, 81% of California's production was sweet wines. For decades, wine production was low and limited.

Leading the way to new methods of wine production was research conducted at the University of California, Davis, and Cornell University in New York state. Viticulturists at the universities published reports on which varieties of grapes grew best in which regions, held seminars on wine-making techniques, consulted with grape growers and wine-makers, offered academic degrees in viticulture, and promoted the production of quality wines. In the 1970s and 1980s, success by Californian wine-makers in Napa, Sonoma, Santa Cruz and Monterey Counties helped to secure foreign investment from other wine-making regions, most notably the Champenois of France. Wine-makers also cultivated vineyards in Oregon and Washington, Finger Lakes New York and numerous other locales.

Americans became more educated about wines, and increased their demand for high-quality wine. All 50 states now have some acreage in vineyard cultivation. By 2004, 668 million gallons (25.3 million hectoliters) of wine were consumed in the United States. As of 2022, the U.S. produces over 752 million gallons of wine a year, of which California produces 81%, followed by New York, Washington, and Oregon. In the second decade of the 21st century, the US wine industry faces the growing challenges of competition from international exports and managing domestic regulations on interstate sales and shipment of wine.

== Wine regions ==
There are nearly 3,000 commercial vineyards in the United States, and at least one winery in each of the 50 states.

- West Coast – More than 90% of the total American wine production occurs in the states of California, Washington, and Oregon.
- Southwestern United States – Notably New Mexico and Arizona
- Rocky Mountain Region – Notably Idaho and Colorado
- Southern United States – Notably Texas, Kentucky, Tennessee, Georgia, and Alabama
- Midwestern United States – Notably Ohio, Michigan, Indiana, and Missouri
- Great Lakes region – Notably Michigan, New York, Ohio and Pennsylvania
- East Coast of the United States – Notably Connecticut, Massachusetts, Rhode Island, Maryland, Long Island, New York, New Jersey, North Carolina and Virginia.

=== Production by state ===
Production of wine per state in 2025 as follows:

2025 production of wine
State	Production (gal)	Production (%)
Alabama	20,044	0.004%
Alaska	164,311	0.029%
Arizona	246,941	0.044%
Arkansas	146,135	0.026%
California	442,819,050	79.259%
Colorado	710,626	0.127%
Connecticut	131,897	0.003%
Delaware	1,9160	0.003%
Dist. of Columbia		
Florida	1,166,558	0.209%
Georgia	490,021	0.088%
Hawaii	23,749	0.004%
Idaho	350,544	0.063%
Illinois	1,688,894	0.302%
Indiana	6,685,484	1.197%
Iowa	194,016	0.036%
Kansas	74,551	0.013%
Kentucky	6,346,956	1.136%
Louisiana	38,041	0.007%
Maine	343,068	0.061%
Maryland	288,251	0.052%
Massachusetts	10,222,382	1.830%
Michigan	2,182,426	0.391%
Minnesota	546,027	0.098%
Mississippi	10,168	0.002%
Missouri	2,402,628	0.430%
Montana	321,753	0.430%
Nebraska	257,175	0.046%
Nevada	1,055	0.0002%
New Hampshire	169,633	0.026%
New Jersey	2,723,398	0.487%
New Mexico	199,746	0.036%
New York	23,624,062	4.228%
North Carolina	1,741,867	0.312%
North Dakota	15,349	0.003%
Ohio	2,992,572	0.536%
Oklahoma	71,720	0.013%
Oregon	15,687,768	2.808%
Pennsylvania	7,175,623	1.284%
Rhode Island	58,009	0.010%
South Carolina	153,524	0.027%
South Dakota	32,208	0.006%
Tennessee	292,044	0.052%
Texas	2,122,696	0.380%
Utah	80,805	0.014%
Vermont	3,035,982	0.543%
Virginia	1,700,063	0.304%
Washington	24,648,307	4.412%
West Virginia	30,198	0.005%
Wisconsin	2,312,622	0.414%
Wyoming	18,789	0.003%
Sum	558,700,316	100%

== Appellation system ==
The early American appellation system was based on the political boundaries of states and counties. In September 1978, the Bureau of Alcohol, Tobacco, and Firearms (ATF) and since 2003, the Alcohol and Tobacco Tax and Trade Bureau {TTB}, exercise regulations to establish American Viticultural Areas (AVA) based on distinct terroir conditions based on local geographical, climate and soil features. In June 1980, the Augusta AVA in Missouri was established as the first American Viticultural Area under the new appellation system. For the sake of wine labeling purposes, the use of state and county appellations were grandfathered in and are still used often in lieu of AVAs. There are 280 established AVAs designated under U.S. law as of August 2026.

=== Appellation labeling laws ===
In order to have an AVA appear on a wine label, at least 85% of the grapes used to produce the wine must have been grown in the AVA.

For a state or county appellation to appear on the wine label, 75% of the grapes used must be from that state or county. Some states have stricter requirements. For example, California requires 100% of the grapes used to be from California for a wine labeled as such, and Washington requires 95% of the grapes in a Washington wine be grown in Washington. If grapes are from two or three contiguous counties or states, a label can have a multi-county or multi-state designation so long as the percentages used from each county or state are specified on the label.

American wine or United States is a rarely used appellation that classifies a wine made from anywhere in the United States, including Puerto Rico and Washington, D.C. Wines with this designation are similar to the French wine vin de table, and can not include a vintage year. By law, this is the only appellation allowed for bulk wines exported to other counties.

=== Semi-generic wines ===
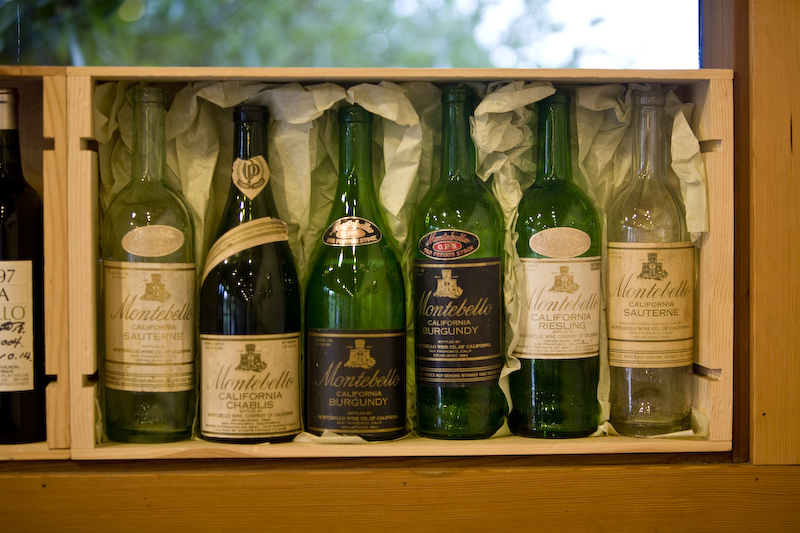
An example of American wines using semi-generic labels of burgundy, chablis, etc.

U.S. laws formerly allowed American made wines to be labeled as "American Burgundy" or "California champagne", even though these names are restricted in Europe. U.S. laws required usage to include the qualifying area of origin to go with these semi-generic names. Other semi-generic names in the United States include Claret, Chablis, Chianti, Madeira, Malaga, Marsala, Moselle, Port, Rhine wine, Sauternes (often spelled on U.S. wine labels as Sauterne or Haut Sauterne), Sherry, and Tokay. The practice largely ceased in 2006 with the Wine Trade Agreement, though brands that were already using the terms can continue the practice, considered grandfathered in.

== Other U.S. labeling laws ==
For bottles labeled with a varietal, at least 75% of the grapes used to make the wine must be of that varietal. In Oregon, the requirement is 90% for certain varietals, such as pinot noir. At least 95% of the wine must be from a particular vintage for that year to appear on the label. Prior to the early 1970s, all grapes had to be from the vintage year. Additionally, all labels must list the alcohol content based on percentage by volume, state that the wine contains sulfites, and carry the Surgeon General's warning about alcohol consumption.

== Distribution ==
Following the repeal of Prohibition, the United States federal government allowed each state to regulate its own production and sale of alcohol. For the majority of states, this led to the development of a three-tier distribution system between the producer, wholesaler, and consumer. Depending on the state, there are some exceptions, with wineries allowed to sell directly to consumers on site at the winery or to ship wine across state lines. Some states allow interstate sales through e-commerce. In the 2005 case Granholm v. Heald, the Supreme Court of the United States struck down state laws that banned interstate shipments but allowed in-state sales. This Supreme Court decision meant that states could decide to allow both out-of-state wine sales and in-state sales, or ban both altogether.

Convenience stores and retail stores are large distributors of wine, with over 175,000 outlets that sell wine across the United States. In addition, there are around 332,000 other locations (bars, restaurants, etc.) that sell wine, contributing to the $30+ billion in annual sales over the past three years. In 2010, the average monthly per-store sales of wine jumped to nearly $12,000 from $9,084 in 2009. The average gross margin dollars from wine increased to $3,324 from $2,616 in the year prior, with gross margin percentages up to an average 28.2 percent in 2010, versus 27 percent in 2009.

== Largest producers ==
As of 2024, the largest producers of wine in the U.S. are:

1. E & J Gallo Winery - 100 million cases sold per year
2. The Wine Group - 45 million cases sold per year
3. Trinchero Family Estates - 20 million cases sold per year
4. Constellation Brands - 18 million cases sold per year
5. Delicato Family Wines - 6 million cases sold per year
6. Treasury Wine Estates - 8 million cases sold per year
7. Bronco Wine Company - 8 million cases sold per year
8. Deutsch Family Wine & Spirits (Josh Cellars) - 13 million cases sold per year
9. Ste. Michelle Wine Estates - 6 million cases sold per year
10. Jackson Family Wines - 6 million cases sold per year
11. Precept Wine - 3 million cases sold per year
12. Bogle Family Wine Collection - 2.5 million cases sold per year

== See also ==
- History of wine
- American wine-producing regions
- Winemaking
- Agriculture in the United States
