= Mississippi wine =

Wine made from grapes grown in Mississippi, United States

Mississippi
- Wine region
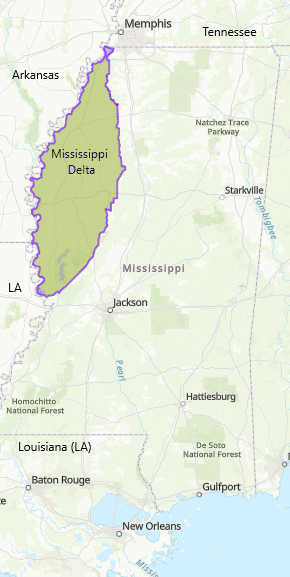
- Official name: State of Mississippi
- Type: U.S. State Appellation
- Year established: 1817
- Country: United States
- Sub-regions: Mississippi Delta AVA
- Climate region: Humid subtropical
- Total area: 30 million acres (46,923 sq mi)
- No. of vineyards: 2
- Grapes produced: Carlos, Muscadine, Noble
- No. of wineries: 3

Mississippi wine refers to wine made from grapes grown in the U.S. state of Mississippi. State names in the United States automatically qualify as legal appellations of origin for wine produced from grapes grown in that state and do not require registration with the Alcohol and Tobacco Tax and Trade Bureau (TTB) of the Treasury Department. TTB was created in January 2003, when the Bureau of Alcohol, Tobacco and Firearms, or ATF, was extensively reorganized under the provisions of the Homeland Security Act of 2002.
The hot and humid climate of Mississippi makes it very difficult to cultivate vitis vinifera or French hybrid grapes. The three commercial wineries in Mississippi focus almost entirely on the Muscadine grape, a variety also used for non-alcoholic grape juices, jams, and jellies. The state's only American Viticultural Area (AVA), Mississippi Delta, lies within the state boundaries and extends into Louisiana and Tennessee.

== History ==
Mississippi has been producing wines since the state was established in 1817. Families created their own blends using the abundant muscadine grape that grows freely in the sub-tropical region. However, thirteen years before Prohibition in the United States, in 1907, wine production was suppressed due to a statute banning the manufacture and sale of Mississippi wine. Due to the long-lasting effect prohibition created in the deep south, Mississippi was the last state to repeal the Volstead Act in 1966, and many counties remain dry through present day.

The obstacles that history has created for wine production in the state are still being overcome. Currently, there are 3 commercial wineries, one American Viticultural Area, and no listed wine trails in the state of Mississippi.

== Climate and geography ==
Mississippi is in the south-east of the United States and is bordered east by Alabama, west by Louisiana, north by Tennessee, and south by the Gulf of Mexico. This location, with latitudes of 30 degrees N and 35 degrees N, produces a sub-tropical climate with long, humid summers and short, mild winters. Fungal diseases like mildew and Pierce disease are widespread. Unforeseeable weather patterns stemming from the Gulf of Mexico also present a large risk for growing seasons. The unpredictable Mississippi climate makes it difficult to grow other varieties of grapes, which is why the state's wine industry has never seen any significant emergence.

== The Muscadine Grape ==
The condition of Mississippi's climate and terroir makes it nearly impossible to grow Vitis vinifera, or French hybrid grape varieties. Mississippi wineries cultivate the muscadine grape and its varieties due to its abundance throughout the region and resistance to humid conditions. Muscadine is the title given to a group of vine varieties most common in the South-Eastern United States. The varieties of the muscadine grape can be either light or dark and have very thick skins which make them highly resistant to fungal and bacterial diseases that thrive in humid weather. As the health benefits of wine gain significance in the wine industry, so do muscadines, as it is known that their thick skins contain high levels of the compound Resveratrol, which is linked to heart health and cancer prevention. Also of great prevalence, is the muscadine's opposition to Phylloxera, which plagued Europe's vineyards in the late 19th century. This evolutionary trait has helped scientists in making noteworthy progress towards finding a solution for phylloxera. Consequently, almost all Vitis vinifera vines are joined with elements of phylloxera-resistant American vine species like the muscadine.

== Wineries ==
The 3 listed Mississippi wineries are Almarla Vineyards, Gulf Coast Winery, and Old South Winery. Almarla Vineyards, located in Shubuta, Mississippi and Gulf Coast Winery, located in Gulf Port, MS have little information listed. However, it is known that both wineries utilize the muscadine grape and its varieties to cultivate sweet wines. Old South Winery, located in Natchez, MS, opened in 1979 with the intent to provide residents and tourists alike with "The Best in Everything Muscadine". Old South winery lists 10 different wines on their website that fall under the categories: Red, White, and Rose & Other wines. Their red blends which utilize the noble grape variety of the muscadine consist of Sweet Noble, Dry Noble, and semi-dry red Natchez Rouge. Similarly, their white blends consist of: semi-sweet white Southern Belle, sweet whites Blue Bayou and Sweet Magnolia, and dry white Carlos, which utilizes the carlos grape variety of the muscadine. They also list two roses, sweet rose Miss Scarlett and semi-sweet rose Miss Blush, along with a semi-sweet blueberry wine named Blueberry Thrill.

== Mississippi Delta AVA ==
The 3.8-million-acre (6,000 sq mi) Mississippi Delta was established in 1984, extending into the border states of Tennessee and Louisiana, has not attracted any large-scale viticulture endeavors. Regardless of widespread confidence in the AVA, obstacles like Mississippi's tough growing climate and state prohibition from 1907 to 1966 deterred wine production in the area. The wine produced in the Mississippi Delta consists almost entirely of the muscadine grape and its varieties. The wine is mostly consumed locally; and therefore, is rarely marketed outside the state.
