= Delta and Providence Cooperative Farms =

The Delta and Providence Cooperative Farms were started in Bolivar County, Mississippi, in 1936; and Holmes County, Mississippi, in 1939, respectively. The farms were founded and run by missionary evangelist and author Sherwood Eddy, and Reverend Sam H. Franklin, with the goal of helping southern sharecroppers out of their economic plight (caused in part by side effects of the New Deal's Agricultural Adjustment Administration). Eddy drew considerable support from his friend, the theologian Reinhold Niebuhr, who once called the farms "the most significant experiment in social Christianity now being conducted in America."

The cooperatives were organized around four principles: efficiency in production and economy in finance through the cooperative principle, participation in building a socialized economy of abundance, inter-racial justice, and realistic religion as a social dynamic. In the early stages, many of the first cooperative members at the Delta Cooperative Farm were sharecroppers from eastern Arkansas who had been evicted following a strike.

Because the farms were committed to economic equality among races, all cooperative members were to receive equal pay for equal work. Agricultural operations included growing cotton, dairy and beef farms, a pasteurizing plant, and a saw mill. The cooperatives also provided a number of social and other services to members and the surrounding communities, including a cooperative store, a credit union, a medical clinic, educational programs, a library, religious services, and summer work camps for students.

Due to several factors, including the tense political climate of the 1950s and poor cotton sales at Providence, cooperative efforts were abandoned around 1956, and pieces of the land were sold off to members.

== See also ==
- Agriculture in Mississippi
