= Vitis popenoei =

Totoloche

Scientific classification
- Kingdom: Plantae
- Clade: Tracheophytes
- Clade: Angiosperms
- Clade: Eudicots
- Clade: Rosids
- Order: Vitales
- Family: Vitaceae
- Genus: Vitis
- Species: V. popenoei

Binomial name
- Vitis popenoei J.L.Fennell

Species of grapevine

Vitis popenoei, commonly called the totoloche, or totoloche grape, is a New World species of liana in the grape family native to Belize, Mexico (Chiapas, Hidalgo, Oaxaca, Puebla, Tabasco, Veracruz, and eastern Querétaro), and north-central Guatemala (Alta Verapaz).

== See also ==
- Muscadine
