= Maine wine =

Varietal made from fruit grown in Maine

Maine
- Wine region
- Official name: State of Maine
- Type: U.S. state
- Year established: 1820
- Years of wine industry: 1983-present
- Country: United States
- Total area: 33,414 square miles (86,542 km^{2})
- Grapes produced: Cayuga, Concord, De Chaunac, Leon Millot, Marechal Foch, Niagara, Seyval blanc
- No. of wineries: 17

Maine wine is made from fruit grown in the U.S. state of Maine. Most is made from fruit other than grapes, including apple, cranberry, and blueberry wines. A few wineries in Maine produce limited quantities of wine made from locally grown French hybrid grape varieties. Maine's climate is too cold for viticulture. The first winery in Maine, Bartlett Maine Estate Winery, was established in 1983.

== See also ==
- List of wineries in New England
