= Montana wine =

Alcohol made from grapes in U.S. state of Montana

Montana
- Wine region
- Official name: State of Montana
- Type: U.S. state
- Year established: 1889
- Country: United States
- Total area: 83,500 square miles (216,264 km^{2})
- Grapes produced: Pinot Gris, Chardonnay, Gewurztraminer, Merlot, Maréchal Foch
- No. of wineries: 8

Montana wine refers to wine made from grapes grown in the U.S. state of Montana. There are eight wineries in Montana, with most producing wine from fruits other than grapes or from grapes grown in other states, such as California, Oregon, or Washington. The traditional grape varieties that appear to do best in the mountainous terroir of Montana are the grapes widely grown in the most northerly vineyards of France, with which Montana shares its latitudinal position of 42-49°N. There are no American Viticultural Areas in Montana.

One of New Zealand's largest and oldest wineries, Montana Wines, renamed its range to Brancott Estate in 2010 in order to avoid confusion in the United States, New Zealand's largest wine export market.
