= Three Sisters (Georgia) =

Mountain in Georgia, United States

Three Sisters Mountain
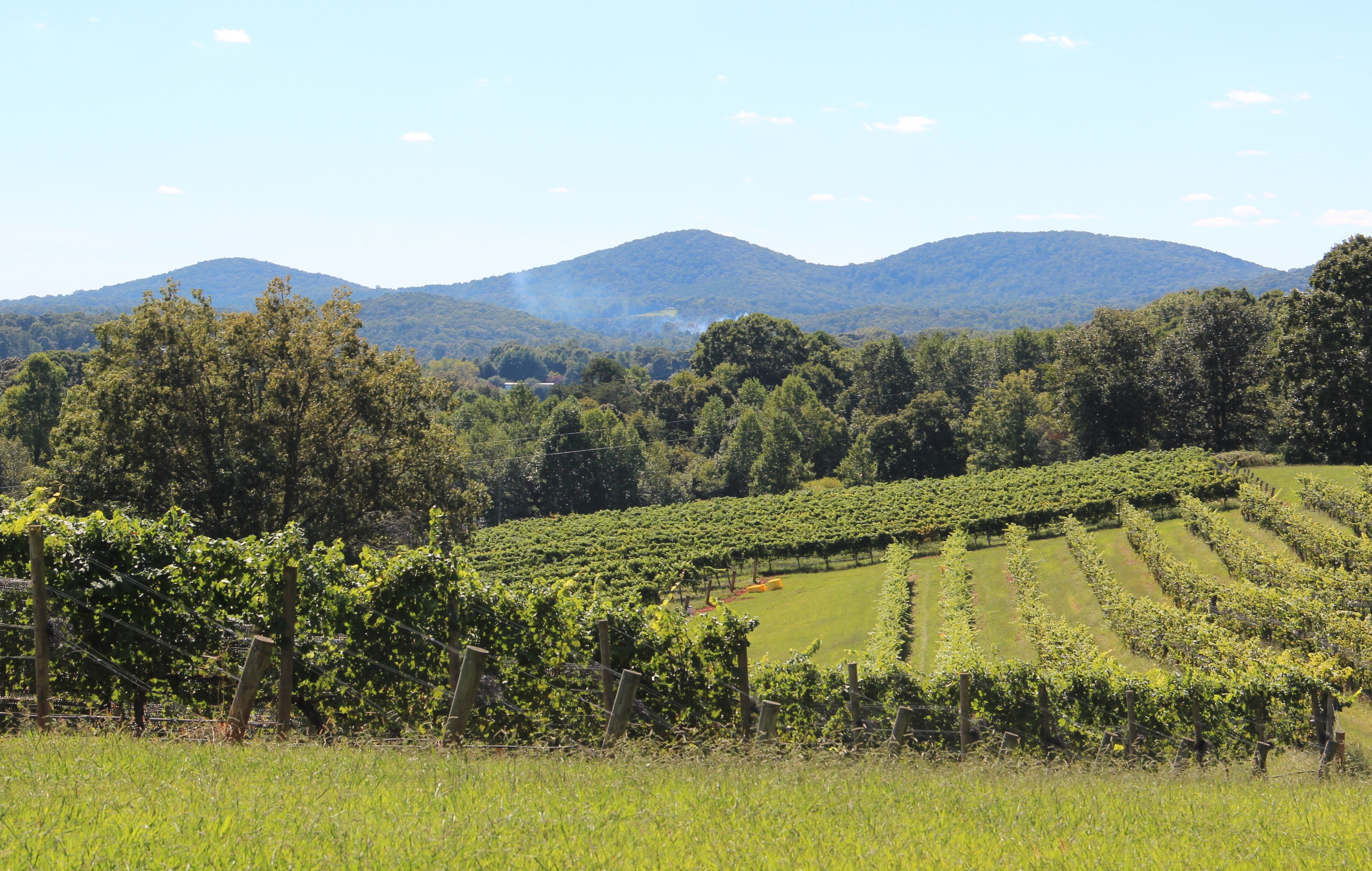
- View of the Three Sisters

Highest point
- Elevation: 2,131 ft (650 m)
- Prominence: 369 ft (112 m)
- Coordinates: 34°35′48″N 83°56′40″W

Geography
- Location within Georgia
- Location: Lumpkin County, Georgia
- Topo map: USGS Dahlonega

Three Sisters Mountain is a mountain near Dahlonega, Lumpkin County, Georgia with a trio of peaks known locally as Rattlesnake, Wildcat and McBrayer. The middle summit is the highest with an elevation of 2,131 feet (650 m).
