= L'Abeille américaine =

L'Abeille américaine, Journal Historique, Politique, et Litteraire à Philadelphie was an American French language newspaper, based in Philadelphia The weekly newspaper, published by A.J. Blocquerst, began publication in 1815. The founder of the newspaper, Jean Simon Chaudron, had escaped from Saint-Domingue.

== See also ==
- Francophonie
- French Louisiana
