= Louisiana Agricultural Finance Authority =

According to the official website of the Louisiana Department of Agriculture and Forestry:

The Louisiana Agricultural Finance Authority (LAFA) has the power to provide financial assistance to the Louisiana agricultural community. It has financed, constructed and owns most of the office buildings and supporting facilities utilized by the department.

This authority is granted under the Louisiana Agricultural Finance Act of 1983 (La.R.S. § 260, et seq.) according to the La. Revised Statutes, Title 3, Section 262, Paragraph C (La. R.S. § 262.C.) :

The legislature hereby finds and declares that it is a matter of grave public necessity that the Louisiana Agricultural Finance Authority be created and empowered to alleviate the severe shortage of capital and credit available at affordable interest rates for investment in agriculture, including buildings and related facilities used by the Department of Agriculture and Forestry to promote and assist agriculture and forestry within this state, and for the export of agricultural products, commodities, and services, and for capital investment in converting to aquacultural farming, and for capital investment in mariculture projects by providing such capital and credit at interest rates within the financial means of persons and businesses engaged in agriculture and agricultural exports.

The current (March, 2012) director of the LAFA is René Simon and current contact information can be obtained at the office's main web page at the LDAF website.

The authority is one of the management and finance offices in the departmental structure.

In addition to the general powers outlined above, current responsibilities include administering:

- the Louisiana Farm and Agribusiness Recovery Grant & Loan Program; and,
- the Louisiana Agribusiness Recovery Loan Program Phase 2.
