= Oklahoma wine =

Oklahoma
- Wine region
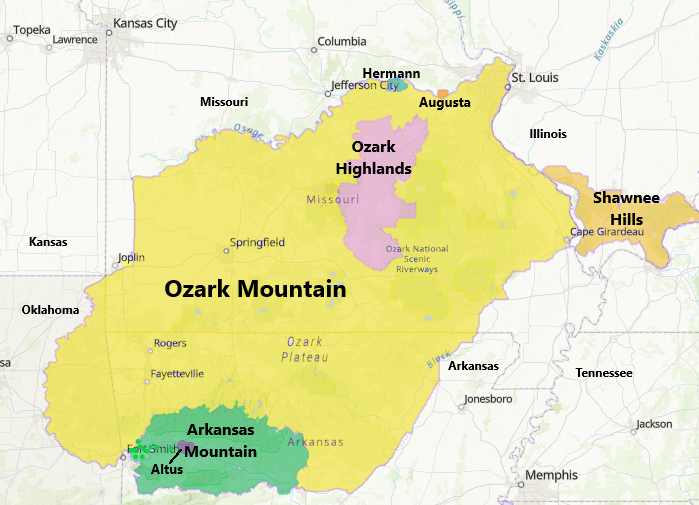
- Oklahoma wine region
- Official name: State of Oklahoma
- Type: U.S. State Appellation
- Year established: 1907
- Country: United States
- Sub-regions: Ozark Mountain AVA
- Climate region: Humid subtropical/continental in highlands
- Total area: 44.1 million acres (68,959 sq mi)
- Grapes produced: Alicante Bouschet, Barbera, Cabernet Franc, Cabernet Sauvignon, Catawba, Chambourcin, Chardonel, Chardonnay, Chenin blanc, Concord, Gewürztraminer, Merlot, Muscat Canelli, Niagara, Norton, Petite Sirah, Pinot gris, Pinot noir, Riesling, Sauvignon blanc, Seyval blanc, Syrah, Vidal blanc, Vignoles, Villard noir, Viognier, Zinfandel
- No. of wineries: 52

Oklahoma wine refers to wine made from grapes grown in the U.S. state appellation of Oklahoma. Wine production was a significant component of the Oklahoma agricultural economy in the 1920s. The industry was destroyed by the Dust Bowl of the 1930s and the introduction of Prohibition in the United States. Oklahoma currently has about 52 wineries. Most of the wineries are located in Green Country (Northeast Oklahoma), Lincoln county and surrounding areas in east central Oklahoma, Central Oklahoma and Southwest Oklahoma.

There is currently one designated American Viticultural Area (AVA) in Oklahoma, the Ozark Mountain AVA.

== Wines ==
Most Oklahoma wineries produce a range of wines ranging from sweet to dry. Several wineries have experimented with non-grape based wines (utilizing everything from peaches to jalapeños peppers), and one winery, Woods and Waters Winery, produces an ice wine. Grape varieties used include international varieties such as Cabernet Sauvignon and Chardonnay, German wine varieties such as Riesling and Gewurztraminer, French hybrids, and American native varieties.

== See also ==
- American wine
