= Rosati, Missouri =

Unincorporated community in Missouri, U.S.

Coordinates: 38°01′37″N 91°31′52″W

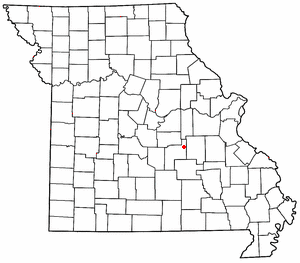

Rosati is an unincorporated community in northeast Phelps County, Missouri, United States. The community is adjacent to the Phelps-Crawford county line on Missouri Route KK four miles (6 km) east of St. James. This road is also the former U.S. Highway 66. The St. Louis–San Francisco Railway passes through the community.

Variant names were "Knobview" and "Spading". The present namesake is the first bishop of the Roman Catholic Archdiocese of Saint Louis, the Italian-born Joseph Rosati.

The area is part of Missouri's grape-growing region and Rosati is well known for its wines. The first Italian immigrants attempted to plant grape varieties from Italy, with no success, and instead grew Concord grapes, used for making juice. In the 1970s, local growers started replacing these vines with wine grape varieties.

== See also ==
- Missouri wine
