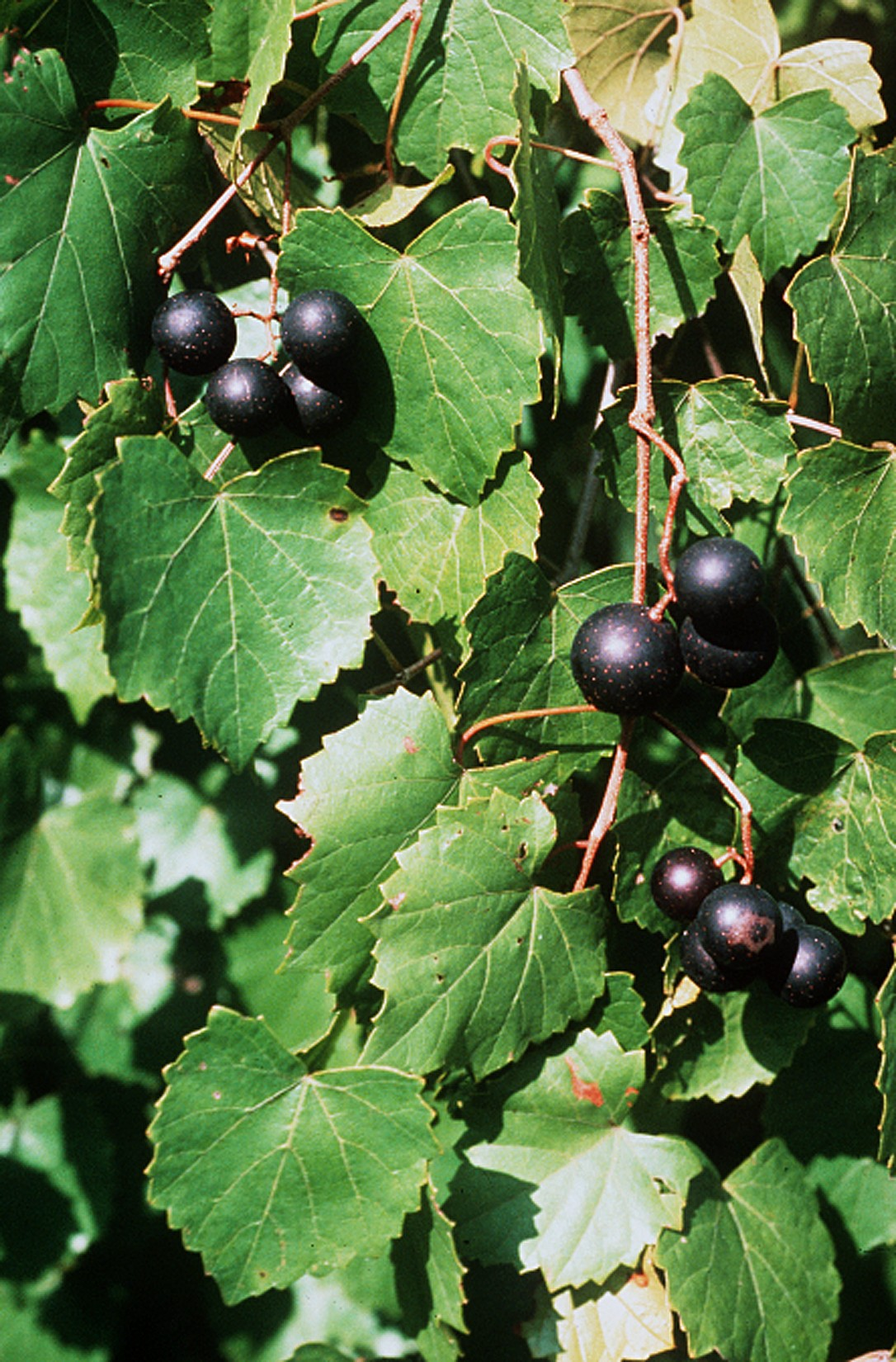

Scientific classification
- Kingdom: Plantae
- Clade: Tracheophytes
- Clade: Angiosperms
- Clade: Eudicots
- Clade: Rosids
- Order: Vitales
- Family: Vitaceae
- Genus: Vitis
- Subgenus: Vitis subg. Muscadinia
- Species: V. rotundifolia

Binomial name
- Vitis rotundifolia Michx.

= Vitis rotundifolia =

Muscadine

Variety of grape

Vitis rotundifolia, or muscadine or swamp grape, is a grapevine species native to the southeastern and south-central United States. The growth range extends from Florida to New Jersey coast, and west to eastern Texas and Oklahoma. It has been extensively cultivated since the 16th century. The plants are well-adapted to their native warm and humid climate; they need fewer chilling hours than better known varieties, and thrive in summer heat.

Muscadine berries may be bronze or dark purple or black when ripe. Wild varieties may stay green through maturity. Muscadines are typically used in making artisan wines, juice, hull pie and jelly. They are rich sources of polyphenols.

In a natural setting, muscadine provides wildlife habitat as shelter, browse, and food for many birds and animals. It is also a larval host for the Nessus Sphinx Moth (Amphion floridensis) and the Mournful Sphinx Moth (Enyo lugubris).

== Taxonomy and pathology ==
Although in the same genus Vitis with the other grapevine species, the muscadine species belongs to a separate subgenus, Muscadinia (all other grapevine species belong to subgenus Euvitis). Usually the species is divided into three varieties, Vitis rotundifolia Michx. var. rotundifolia (southeast USA), Vitis rotundifolia Michx. var. munsoniana (Florida), and Vitis rotundifolia Michx. var. popenoei (Central America). Some taxonomists have suggested giving the muscadines standing as a separate genus. It has also been suggested that the muscadine varieties be upgraded to species rank and so splitting off Vitis munsoniana and Vitis popenoei from Vitis rotundifolia. All muscadines have 40 chromosomes, rather than 38. They are generally not cross-compatible with Euvitis subgenus, and most hybrids between the subgenera. A few are moderately fertile, and have been used in breeding. A commercially available Euvitis × Muscadinia hybrid is the Southern Home cultivar.

Muscadines are hearty grapes with thick and tough skin that protects them from many plant diseases. These grapes nonetheless appear to be susceptible to parasitic nematodes. Some other pests that can be found on the Muscadines are grapevine aphids and grape root borers. However, according to Oscar Liburd, a professor at the University of Florida, pests attacks on the muscadines are not significant.

== Cultivars ==
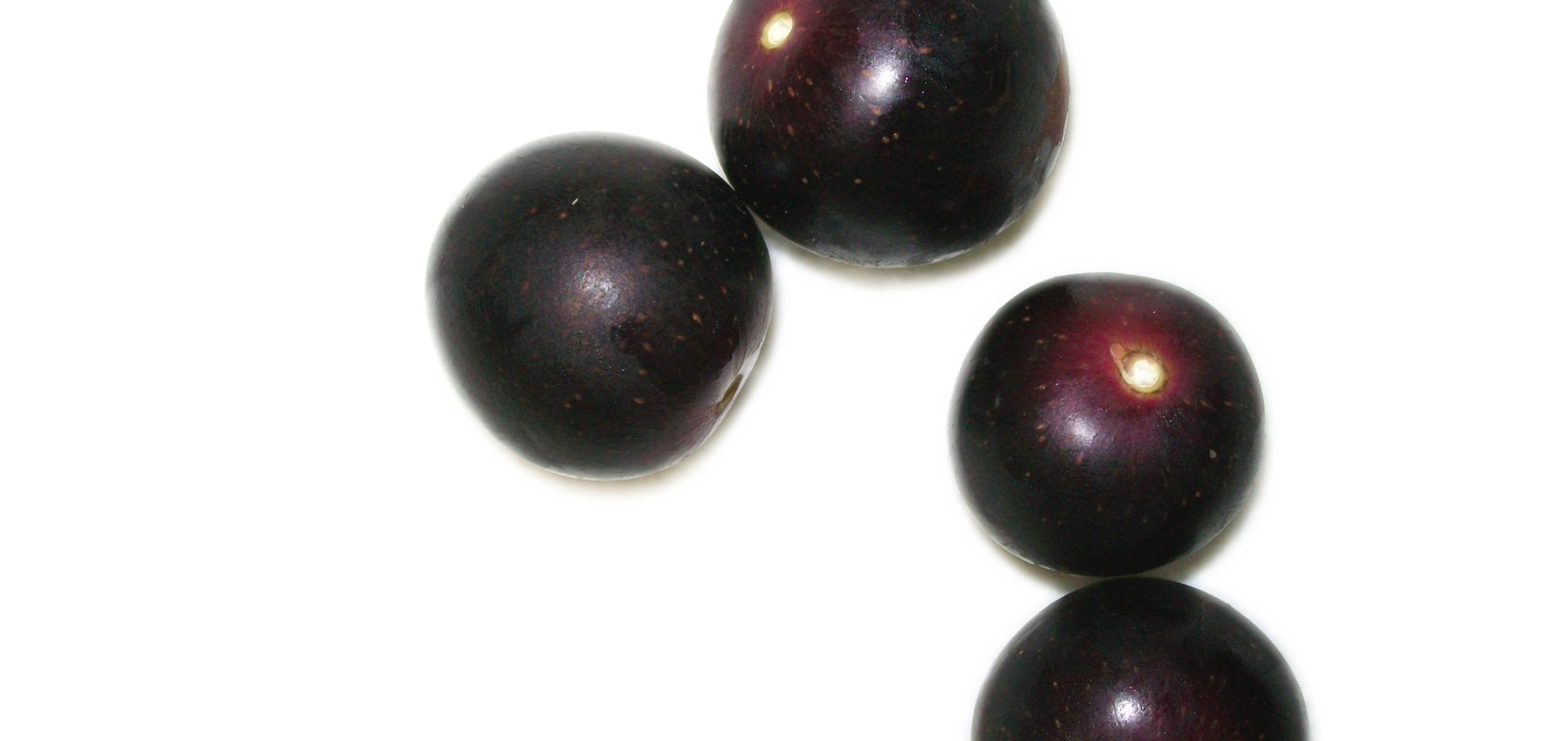
North Carolina muscadine grapes

There are about 152 muscadine cultivars grown in the Southern states. These include bronze, black and red varieties and consist of common grapes and patented grapes.

Unlike most cultivated grapevines, many muscadine cultivars are pistillate, requiring a pollenizer to set fruit. A few, such as 'Carlos' and 'Noble', are perfect-flowered, produce fruit with their own pollen, and may also pollinate pistillate cultivars.

Muscadine grape cultivars may have low or inconsistent yields, small berries, flavor and thick skin unsuitable to consumer acceptance, and disease susceptibility. Cultivars tend to be developed either for a limited fresh market or for winemaking. For consumer acceptance, fresh market grapes need to be large, sweet, and with relatively thin skin, whereas those for wine, juice or jelly need high yields of high-sugar, color-stable berries.

Fresh-market cultivars include Black Beauty, Carlos, Cowart, Flowers, Fry, Granny Val, Ison, James, Jumbo, Magnolia, Memory (first found on T.S. Memory's farm in 1868 in Whiteville, NC), Mish, Nesbitt, Noble, Scuppernong, Summit, Supreme, and Thomas. Produced by the University of Florida, the cultivar, 'Southern Home', contains both subgenera Muscadinia and Euvitis (more precisely, V. rotundifolia × V. vinifera) in its background.

Crops can be started in 3–5 years. Commercial yields of 20–45 tonnes per hectare (8–18 tons per acre) are possible. Muscadines grow best in fertile sandy loam and alluvial soils. They grow wild in well-drained bottom lands that are not subject to extended drought or waterlogging. They are also resistant to pests and diseases, including Pierce's disease, which can destroy other grape species. Muscadine is one of the grape species most resistant to Phylloxera, an insect that can kill roots of grapevines.

=== Appellations ===
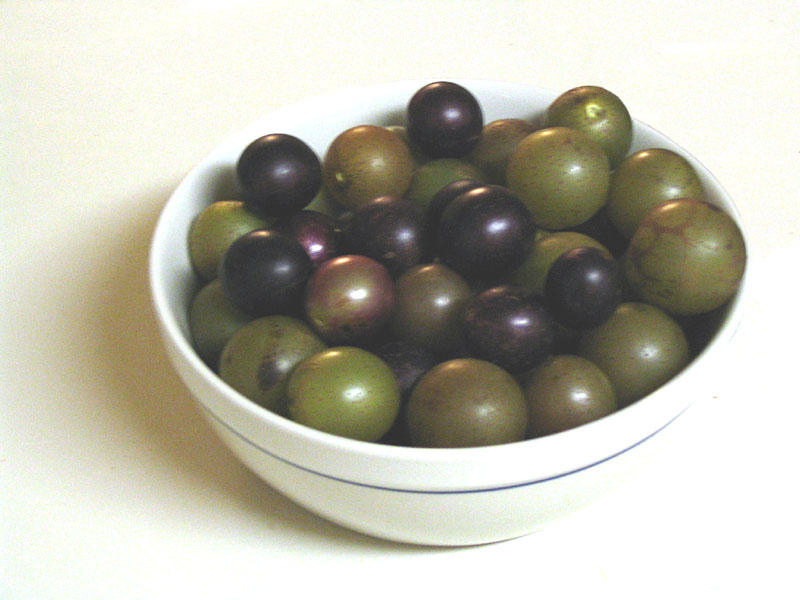
Some muscadines in a bowl; the green grapes are scuppernongs.

Appellations producing Muscadine wines:

- America (Country Appellation)
- Alabama (State Appellation)
- Arkansas (State Appellation)
- Florida (State Appellation)
- Georgia (State Appellation)
- Louisiana (State Appellation)
- Mississippi (State Appellation)
- North Carolina (State Appellation)
- South Carolina (State Appellation)
- Tennessee (State Appellation)
- Texas (State Appellation)

== Nutrients ==
100 grams of muscadine grapes contain the following nutrients according to the USDA:

- Energy: 57 kilocalories
- Fats: 0.47 g
- Carbohydrates: 13.93 g
- Dietary Fiber: 3.9 g
- Protein: 0.81 g
- Calcium: 37 mg
- Phosphorus: 24 mg
- Potassium: 203 mg
- Sodium: 1 mg
- Vitamin C (total ascorbic acid): 6.5 mg
- Riboflavin: 1.5 mg

== Consumer research ==
Consumer research indicates that the thick skins and variable in-season quality of fresh muscadine grapes are significant deterrents to retail acceptance.

== Resveratrol and other polyphenols ==
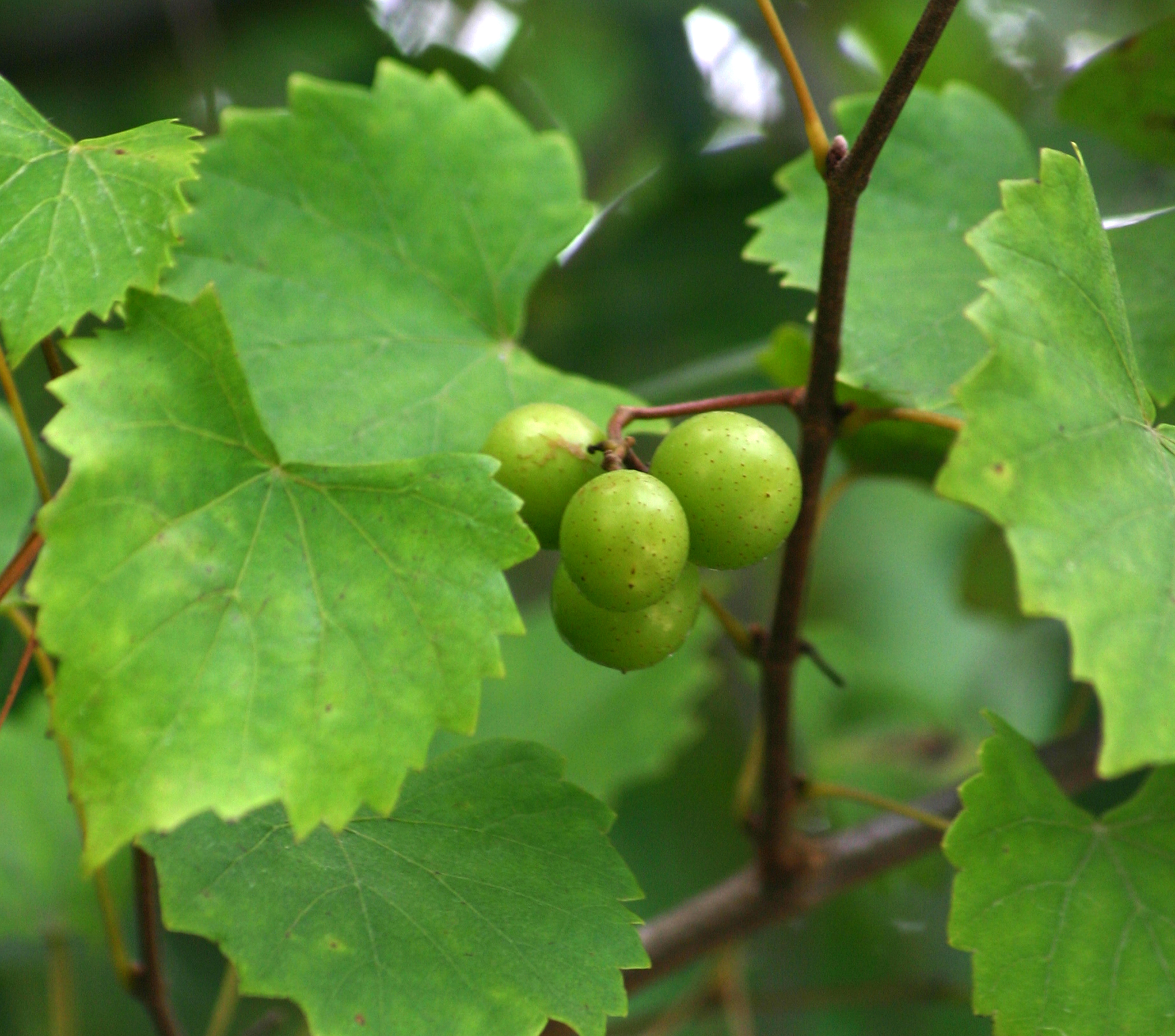
The wild progenitor of the muscadine grape still grows freely in the southeastern United States, such as near Indiantown, South Carolina.

One report indicated that muscadine grapes contained high concentrations of resveratrol, but subsequent studies have found no or little resveratrol in muscadine grapes.

Other muscadine polyphenols include anthocyanins, tannins, and various flavonoids.

The rank order of total phenolic content among muscadine components was found to be seeds, higher than skins, higher than leaves, higher than pulp.
