= List of wineries in Illinois =

The following wineries and vineyards operate wholly or principally in the U.S. state of Illinois. The article for Illinois wine provides an overview of the industry.

Name	Location	Established	Notes
Acquaviva Winery	Maple Park, Illinois	2010	Member of the Northern Illinois Wine Trail.
Alto Vineyards	Alto Pass, Illinois	1988	Member of the Shawnee Hills Wine Trail and located within the Shawnee Hills AVA.
August Hill Winery	Peru, Illinois	2002	Member of the Illinois River Wine Trail.
Baxter's Vineyards and Winery	Nauvoo, Illinois	1989	Originally opened in 1857. Member of the Mississippi Valley Wine Trail.
Berryville Vineyards	Claremont, Illinois	2003	Member of the Wabash Valley Wine Trail.
Blue Sky Vineyard	Makanda, Illinois	2000	Member of the Shawnee Hills Wine Trail and located within the Shawnee Hills AVA.
Bretz Wildlife Lodge and Winery	Carlyle, Illinois	2008	Member of the Carlyle Lake Wine Trail.
Cache River Basin Vineyard and Winery	Belknap, Illinois	2001	
Cameo Vineyards	Greenup, Illinois	2002	Member of the East Central Illinois Wine Trail.
Castle Finn Vineyard and Winery	Marshall, Illinois	2010	Member of the State Line Wine Trail.
City Winery	Chicago, Illinois (two locations)	2012	Opened original site in New York City in 2008.
Collver Family Winery	Barry, Illinois	2002	Closed in 2015
Cooper's Hawk Winery	Woodridge, Illinois	2005	Member of the Northern Illinois Wine Trail.
Crooked Creek Winery	Centralia, Illinois	2014	Member of the Carlyle Lake Wine Trail.
Cunningham Vineyards	Anna, Illinois		This business does not seem to be active and is up for sale.
DC Estate Winery	South Beloit, Illinois		
Famous Fossil Vineyard and Winery	Freeport, Illinois	2004	Ceased operation under this name in 2021. Now operates as The Muse on Cedar Creek, which is currently a restaurant and event space, that may eventually produce wines.
Feather Hills Vineyard and Winery	Makanda, Illinois	2018	Member of the Shawnee Hills Wine Trail and located within the Shawnee Hills AVA.
Fergedaboudit Vineyard and Winery	Hanover, Illinois	2010	Member of the Northern Illinois Wine Trail and located within the Upper Mississippi River Valley AVA.
Fox Creek Vineyards and Winery	Olney, Illinois	1999	Member of the Wabash Valley Wine Trail.
Fox Valley Winery	Oswego, Illinois	2001	Member of the Northern Illinois Wine Trail.
Furrow Vineyard	El Paso, Illinois	2001	Closed in 2008
Galena Cellars Vineyard and Winery	Scales Mound, Illinois	1985	Member of the Northern Illinois Wine Trail and located within the Upper Mississippi River Valley AVA.
GenKota Winery	Mount Vernon, Illinois	2007	Closed in 2015
Hedman Vineyards and Winery	Alto Pass, Illinois	2005	Ceased operation under this name toward the end of 2020
Hickory Ridge Vineyard	Pomona, Illinois		Member of the Shawnee Hills Wine Trail and located within the Shawnee Hills AVA.
Hidden Lake Winery	Aviston, Illinois	2004	Member of the Carlyle Lake Wine Trail.
Hogg Hollow Winery	Golconda, Illinois	2006	
Homestead Vineyards	West Salem, Illinois	2018	Member of the Wabash Valley Wine Trail.
Honker Hill Winery	Carbondale, Illinois	2009	Member of the Shawnee Hills Wine Trail and located within the Shawnee Hills AVA.
Hopewell Winery	Rockport, Illinois	2007	Member of the Mississippi Valley Wine Trail.
Illinois Sparkling Co.	Utica, Illinois	2011	Member of the Illinois River Wine Trail.
Irene's Vineyard and Winery	Oblong, Illinois	2016	Member of the Wabash Valley Wine Trail.
Kickapoo Creek Winery	Edwards, Illinois	2001	Ceased operation at the end of 2021
Kite Hill Vineyards	Carbondale, Illinois	2006	Member of the Shawnee Hills Wine Trail and located within the Shawnee Hills AVA.
Lake Hill Winery	Carthage, Illinois	2010	Member of the Mississippi Valley Wine Trail.
Lasata Wines	Lawrenceville, Illinois	2004	Member of the Wabash Valley Wine Trail.
Lavender Crest Winery	Colona, Illinois	2004	
Lincoln Heritage Winery	Cobden, Illinois	2009	Located within the Shawnee Hills AVA.
Lynfred Winery	Roselle, Illinois	1979	Member of the Northern Illinois Wine Trail.
Mackinaw Valley Vineyard	Mackinaw, Illinois	2003	Member of the Heart of Illinois Wine Trail.
Massbach Ridge Winery	Elizabeth, Illinois	2003	Member of the Northern Illinois Wine Trail.
McEachran Homestead Winery	Caledonia, Illinois	2010	Member of the Northern Illinois Wine Trail.
Monte Allegre Vineyard and Cellars	Carbondale, Illinois	2009	
Niemerg Family Winery	Findlay, Illinois	1997	Member of the East Central Illinois Wine Trail.
Orlandini Vineyard	Makanda, Illinois	1988	Ceased operation under this name at the end of 2017
Owl Creek Vineyard	Cobden, Illinois	1980	Member of the Shawnee Hills Wine Trail and located within the Shawnee Hills AVA.
Peachbarn Winery and Cafe	Alto Pass, Illinois	2020	Member of the Shawnee Hills Wine Trail and located within the Shawnee Hills AVA.
Pomona Winery	Pomona, Illinois	1991	Member of the Shawnee Hills Wine Trail and located within the Shawnee Hills AVA.
Prairie State Winery	Genoa, Illinois	1998	Member of the Northern Illinois Wine Trail.
Press House Winery	Nauvoo, Illinois	2019	Member of the Mississippi Valley Wine Trail.
Rocky Waters Vineyard and Winery	Hanover, Illinois	2008	Member of the Northern Illinois Wine Trail.
Roundhouse Wine Company	Centralia, Illinois		Closed in 2019
Sleepy Creek Vineyards	Fairmount, Illinois	2007	Member of the East Central Illinois Wine Trail.
Spirit Knob Winery	Ursa, Illinois	2002	Member of the Mississippi Valley Wine Trail.
Spoon River Junction Winery	Canton, Illinois		Member of the Illinois River Wine Trail.
StarView Vineyards	Cobden, Illinois	2006	Member of the Shawnee Hills Wine Trail and located within the Shawnee Hills AVA.
Tuscan Hills Winery	Effingham, Illinois	2011	Member of the East Central Illinois Wine Trail.
Twelve Oaks Vineyard	Carlyle, Illinois	2019	Member of the Carlyle Lake Wine Trail.
Vahling Vineyards	Stewardson, Illinois	2002	Member of the East Central Illinois Wine Trail.
Valentino Vineyards and Winery	Long Grove, Illinois	2001	
Vigneto del Bino Vineyard and Winery	Antioch, Illinois	2011	
Villa Marie Winery	Maryville, Illinois	2008	This business appears to be closed, as no evidence of current operation could be found on the web since its bankruptcy filing in February 2018.
The Village Vineyard and Winery	Camp Point, Illinois	2009	Member of the Mississippi Valley Wine Trail.
The Village Vintner	Huntley, Illinois		
Von Jakob Winery	Pomona, Illinois	1996	Member of the Shawnee Hills Wine Trail and located within the Shawnee Hills AVA.
Walker’s Bluff Vineyard	Carterville, Illinois	2008	
Waterman Winery and Vineyards	Waterman, Illinois	2003	
Wichmann Vineyard	Cobden, Illinois	2020	Located within the Shawnee Hills AVA.
Wild Blossom Meadery and Winery	Chicago, Illinois	2005	
Willow Ridge Vineyards & Winery	Shelbyville, Illinois	2007	Member of the East Central Illinois Wine Trail.
Wyldewood Cellars Winery	St. Joseph, Illinois	2010	Winery is based in Kansas, where it opened in 1994. Member of the East Central Illinois Wine Trail.

== See also ==
- List of breweries in Illinois
