= Wayman Presley =

American mail carrier, entrepreneur, and humanitarian

- Born: July 15, 1896; Cobden, Illinois, U.S.
- Died: 1990
- Occupations: Rural mail carrier, entrepreneur, humanitarian
- Known for: Founder of the Bald Knob Cross of Peace; featured on This Is Your Life (1955); founder of Presley Tours
- Spouse: Tressie Rowan
- Children: 1 son
- Awards: Goffrey Hughes Southern Illinois Citizen of the Year (1982); Illinois News Broadcasters Association Man of the Year (1959)

Wayman Presley (1896–1990) was an American rural mail carrier in Makanda, Illinois. He was the principal founder, organizer, and inspiration behind the construction of the Bald Knob Cross of Peace in Alto Pass, Illinois. He was featured on Ralph Edwards's TV show This Is Your Life in April 1955. After retiring from the Postal Service, he started a multi-million dollar tourism company. He is remembered as a humanitarian, an entrepreneur, and a tireless promoter of Southern Illinois.

== Early life ==
Wayman Presley was born July 15, 1896, in Cobden, Illinois. He was the oldest of seven children in the family of sharecroppers Jim and Gertie Presley. Following eighth grade, Presley attended Southern Illinois Normal College in Carbondale, Illinois. Following college, he became a grade school teacher in a one-room schoolhouse in 1915. In November 1917, Presley joined the United States Air Corps. He worked as a rigger at a Royal Air Force field in Scotland until his return to the United States in November, 1918. After World War I, Presley returned home to find his sister in a St. Louis hospital. He sold photos of General John J. Pershing door to door to raise the money for his sister's medical bills. He married Tressie Rowan in 1922 and worked as a fruit and vegetable salesman until 1942. As Postmaster for the Makanda, Illinois area, he consolidated the rural mail route and became the sole mail carrier on the 60 mile route in 1942.

== Bald Knob Cross ==
On Easter Sunday, 1937, Presley and Rev. William Lirely of Makanda, Illinois, organized a non-denominational Christian service on the top of Bald Knob, in Alto Pass, Illinois. Bald Knob is the highest peak in the area. In 1938, Presley and Lirely erected a small cross on Bald Knob for the Easter service. The Bald Knob Easter service with the small lighted cross became an annual tradition.

Presley began a campaign to build a large, permanent cross on Bald Knob. He secured $100 pledges from many local residents to buy the land at the summit of Bald Knob. Presley was the chief fund raiser, organizer and promoter for the Bald Knob Foundation. He convinced many of the farmers along his 60-mile rural mail route to raise a couple of pigs and donate the proceeds from the sale of those pigs to help build the Bald Knob Cross. In 3 years, $30,000 was raised selling these pigs.

In 1954, the Bald Knob Foundation hired a Chicago-based public relations firm to help promote the Cross project. The General Federation of Women's Clubs also stepped forward to help the promotion efforts. As a result of their efforts, Wayman Presley was featured on the television show This Is Your Life, hosted by Ralph Edwards. The episode aired on April 6, 1955. Within weeks of the airing, the Bald Knob Foundation received over $100,000 in donations, mostly in the form of one or two dollars stuffed in an envelope. The structural steel framework for the Cross was completed and dedicated in 1959 and the white porcelain panels were installed in 1963.

== Presley Tours ==
Wayman Presley enjoyed taking fellow Southern Illinoisans on nature hikes in the scenic wooded areas of Southern Illinois. His first hikes were with his Sunday school students. In 1956, he organized a series of train excursions which stopped in Carbondale, Illinois, St. Louis, Missouri and Grand Tower, Illinois on the Mississippi River. When he retired from the Post Office, he and his oldest son organized an excursion train to Miami, Florida for 146 people. The success of this excursion marked the beginning of Presley Tours. Presley Tours has taken thousands of tour groups to the United States, Canada, Mexico and 50 other countries in the world. When a new country was added to the portfolio, Presley would scout out the new locations himself.

== Other Projects and Accomplishments ==
- Wayman Presley met Margaret Land in 1947 while on his mail route. Ms. Land was afflicted with severe elephantiasis in her legs. Presley learned that she did not have long to live and her family had no more money for treatments. He took her to a hospital in St. Louis and guaranteed the cost of her surgeries. In order to pay for the medical expenses, Presley started the Egyptian Gospel Sing Association. This organization held singing competitions throughout southern Illinois and at every meeting, Wayman would pass the hat to collect money for Margaret's medical bills. After many surgeries paid for by Presley, Margaret recovered, married and had two children.
- In November, 1960, Presley lost an election for the Illinois State Senate to John G. Gilbert in a close vote.
- Following the student unrest at Southern Illinois University in 1970, which closed the campus before the end of the semester, Wayman Presley founded a group called "Americans, Inc.". The group, later called "U.S. Citizens, Inc." issued a statement deploring "riots, demonstration, lawlessness, acts of treason, destruction of moral principles and other acts of violence and contempt." Presley had plans for this to be a national organization, but the group was primarily a sounding board for local residents of Southern Illinois to voice their concerns to the leadership at Southern Illinois University during the time of student unrest during the Vietnam War.
- Presley proposed building a series of self-supporting farm communities in Southern Illinois to help get people off of welfare. He wanted to move 200 families to four distinct farms. He said the inspiration for this idea came from his world travels.
- Presley was awarded the Goffrey Hughes Southern Illinois Citizen of the Year Award in April, 1982.
- First Illinois News Broadcasters Association (INBA) Man of the Year - 1959.

== Publications ==
- Adventures of a Traveling Country Boy, Concord Publishing House, 1986
- My Life in Poetry, 1980
- The Story of Hound Dawg Boomer and other early happenings in and around Makanda, Ill, 1972
