= Blue Sky Vineyards =

Blue Sky Vineyard
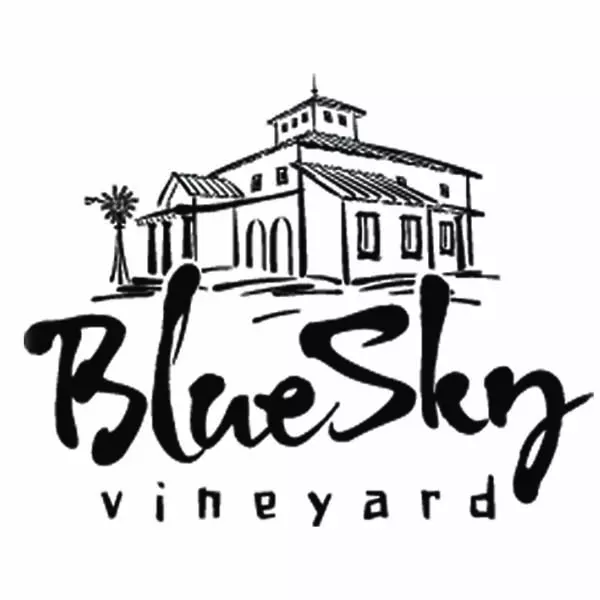
- Location: Makanda, Illinois, United States
- Coordinates: 37°34′38″N 89°06′50″W
- Appellation: Shawnee Hills AVA
- Founded: 2000
- First vintage: 2003
- Key people: Barrett Rochman, Jim Ewers, Karen Hand
- Known for: Chambourcin Reserve
- Varietals: Cabernet Franc, Chambourcin, Chardonnay, Concord (grape), Corot noir, Niagara (grape), Noiret, Norton (grape), Traminette, Vignoles (grape)
- Distribution: Regional, Restaurants
- Tasting: Open to the public
- Website: blueskyvineyard.com

Blue Sky Vineyard is a family-owned vineyard and winery in Illinois, owned and operated by Barrett Rochman, Marilyn Rochman, and Jim Ewers.

Blue Sky Vineyard is located in the heart of the Shawnee National Forest and anchors the eastern end of the Shawnee Hills Wine Trail. The winery is located within the Shawnee Hills American Viticultural Area (AVA), a federally designated wine region established in 2006, recognized for its unique viticulture terroir.

Blue Sky Vineyard produces a number of vintages from Illinois grown grapes. Karen Hand, Blue Sky Vineyard's winemaker, was the Illinois Grape Growers and Vintners Association's Winemaker of the Year in 2006.

The vineyard currently produces 17 different kinds of Illinois wine and 5 American wines ranging from dry to sweet. The Tuscan inspired architecture and interiors of Blue Sky Vineyard's main structure and banquet addition were designed by Nancy Karen Brian, professor at California State University Fresno, in consultation with Blue Sky Vineyard's owners. In addition to wine, the vineyard offers onsite overnight suites, an array of food options, and regular live music, and scenic views of the Shawnee National Forest.

The estate encompasses 13 acres under vine, cultivating a grape varieties such as Chambourcin, Norton, Vignoles, Seyval, Traminette, Niagara, Cabernet Franc, and Chardonnay.

While founded in 2000, the winery opened to the public on July 4, 2005.
