= Mary Tracy Earle =

American writer (1864–1955)

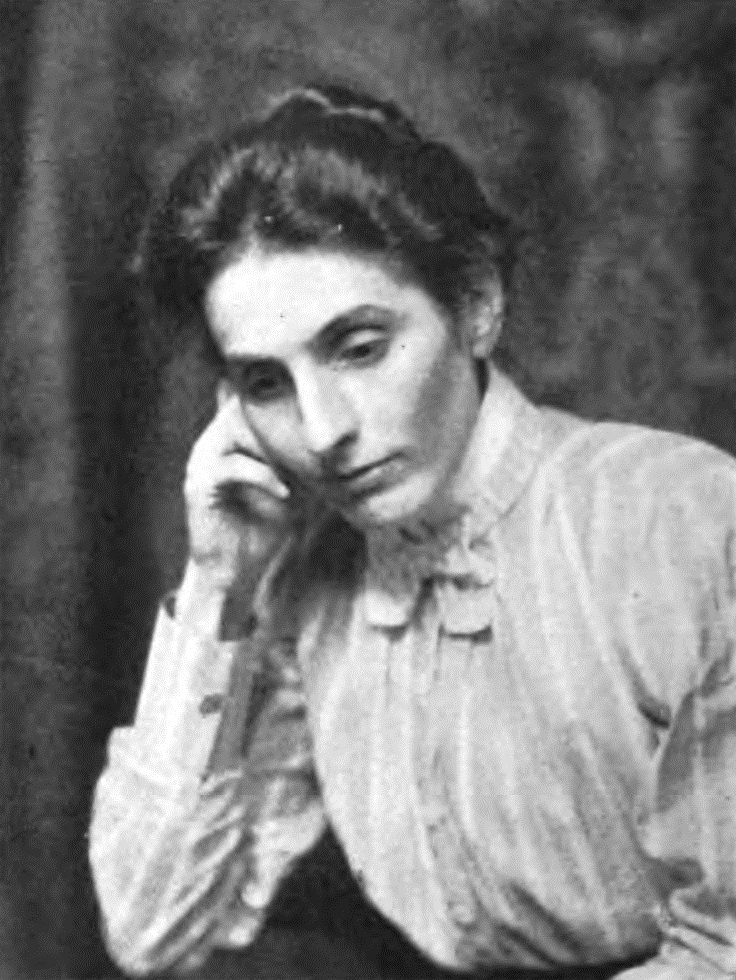
- Born: October 21, 1864; Cobden, Illinois, U.S.
- Died: September 7, 1955 (aged 90); Riverside, California, U.S.
- Education: University of Illinois
- Occupation: Author
- Spouse: William Titus Horne (m. 1862; died 1944)
- Relatives: Hannah Tracy Cutler (mother); Franklin Sumner Earle (brother)

Signature
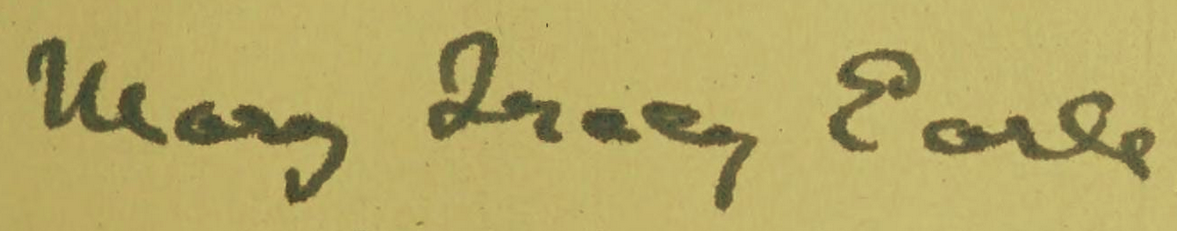

Mary Tracy Earle (October 21, 1864 – September 7, 1955) was an American fiction writer. She contributed short stories and occasional essays to various periodicals. Among her published works can be counted The Wonderful Wheel (1896), The Man Who Worked for Collister (1898), Through Old Rose Glasses (1900), and The Flag on the Hilltop (1902).

== Early life and education ==
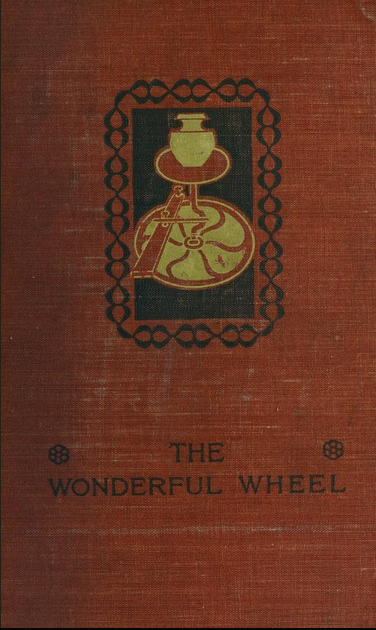
The Wonderful Wheel

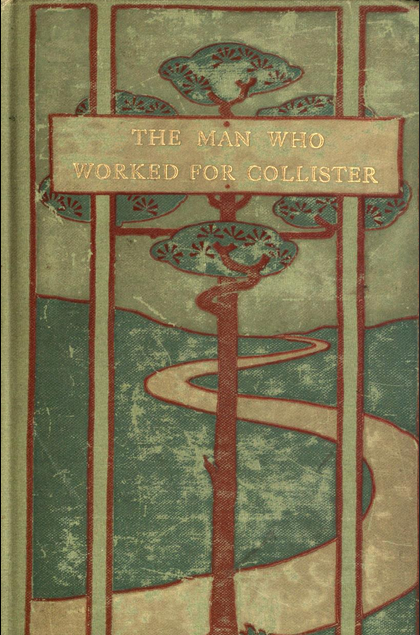
The Man Who Worked for Collister

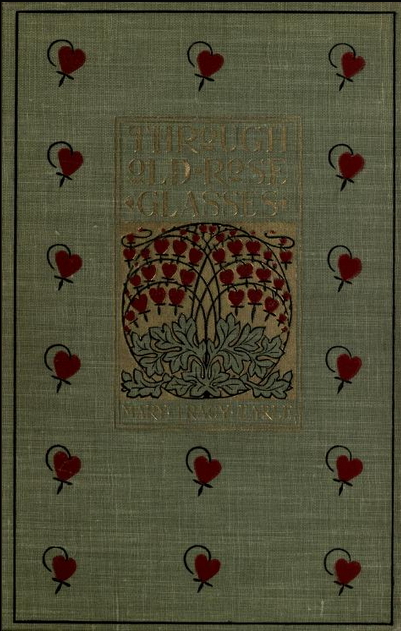
Through Old Rose Glasses

The Flag on the Hilltop

Mary Tracy Earle was born in Cobden, Illinois, October 21, 1864. Her parents were Parker and Melanie (Tracy) Earle. Parker was the horticultural director at the World Cotton Centennial in New Orleans, 1884. Melanie's mother, Hannah Tracy Cutler was an abolitionist as well as a leader of the temperance and women's suffrage movements in the United States. Mary had two brothers: Charles Theodore Earle, and the mycologist, Franklin Sumner Earle.

Earle attended Cobden High School. She represented Alethenai Literary Society in the intersociety oratorical contest of 1884, while attending the University of Illinois. She graduated from the University of Illinois in 1885 (B.S.) and received an A.M. degree in 1903.

== Career ==
Beginning in 1885, Earle lived in the Southern United States, where she began to write, at first not with any purpose, but simply in accordance to the inspiration. As she grew older, her predilection for literary pursuits became more pronounced, and in 1898, when she removed to New York City, it was with the intention of devoting herself seriously to a writing career. She continued writing through 1904. From 1904 to 1907, she served as a Librarian and Editorial Assistant, Estación Central Agronómica de Cuba. In 1907, she returned to writing.

On July 1, 1906, in Santiago de las Vegas, Cuba, she married William Titus Horne (1876-1944), Professor of Plant Pathology in the University of California, Berkeley.

From 1887, Earle contributed short stories and occasional essays in The Outlook, The Atlantic Monthly, The Century, Everybody's, Harper's Weekly, McClure's, Scribner's, as well as other magazines and papers. She was also the author of: The Wonderful Wheel (Century Company, 1896); The Man Who Worked for Collister (Copeland & Day, Boston, 1898); Through Old Rose Glasses (Houghton, Mifflin & Co., Boston, 1900); and The Flag on the Hilltop (Houghton, Mifflin & Co., Boston, 1902). Most of her stories were of the South, where she had spent much of her time, but some are of Southern Illinois.

== Personal life ==
In 1907, Earle was living in Santiago de las Vegas, Cuba. In 1913, she was living in Berkeley, California. She died in Riverside, California, September 7, 1955.

== Selected works ==
- The Wonderful Wheel, 1896
- The Man Who Worked for Collister, 1898
- Through Old Rose Glasses, 1900
- The Flag on the Hilltop, 1902
