= Arrouya =

Arrouya may refer to one of four wine grape varieties:

- Arrouya noir
- Cabernet Franc
- Fer
- Manseng noir
