= Hidden Lake Winery =

Winery in Illinois, USA

- Location: Aviston, Illinois, United States
- Coordinates: 38°34′14″N 89°37′46″W
- Key people: Angela and Steve Gorazd (owners); Cory Kunkel (winemaker)

Hidden Lake Winery is one of the largest wineries in Southern Illinois and was opened to the public in 2005. It stretches across 92 acres of forest and includes the winery facility, guest cabins, event venues, and a banquet center.

Hidden Lake Winery is located in Aviston, Illinois, although its address can be entered as any of three towns: Aviston, Germantown, or Trenton. It is one of the largest wineries in the state, both in area and in the number of people visiting.

== Property ==
Hidden Lake Winery is home to a small vineyard, a winery, two lakes, a banquet hall, a wine tasting room, a restaurant, ten cabins, a pavilion, a sculpture garden, and a forest. The cabins are listed as a "Bed and Breakfast," and include 8 deluxe cabins, and 2 honeymoon cabins.

== History ==
The area that the winery is built on, called "Silent Forest," is known by a popular story that a bootlegger produced whiskey in the area in the early 1900s. It is also known by local people as a good hunting area, for both game and mushrooms. It is illegal to hunt on private property without express permission of the owner.

=== 2004-2005 ===
Dale Holbrook, the winery's founder, purchased 92 acres of forest, on which was built a private residence and a small warehouse. Dale purchased an alcohol distribution license, and started Hidden Lake Winery in mid-2004, making wine out of his warehouse. It was during this time that he also began building onto the warehouse. The winery was added onto it on June 1, 2005, and ever since it has been adding onto itself.

When the winery opened on June 1, 2005, it began with 82 acres of land, and the two-story cedar building along with the original lake was already on the property.

=== 2006-2007 ===
In 2007, Hidden Lake Winery participated in the ART in the Park Festival in Belleville, IL.

In 2007, many wineries in Southern Illinois formed a "wine trail," (a group of wineries working together and advertising for each other in order to promote business for the area) called the Heartland Rivers Wine Trail. Hidden Lake Winery joined the wine trail that same year. "It's good for the local economy," said Holbrook, who added that other businesses are welcome to join the wine trail as associate members. In late August of that year, Hidden Lake Winery hosted the first Illinois Wine Festival. The two-day-long event featured vendors from businesses across the area, such as wineries, photographers and musicians.

=== 2016 ===
The winery was put up for sale in 2016. Angela and Steve Gorazd, founders of the firm Got Wine, purchased the property for $1.5 million and began expanding by adding a new venue and improving the property.
