= Slushy Noobz =

Canadian YouTube channel

- Andrijasevic (left) and Al-Emad (right) in 2026
- Born: Hamzah Al-Emad; March 5, 2002 (age 24) Sanaa, Yemen; Martin Andrijasevic; March 25, 1999 (age 27) Edmonton, Alberta
- Years active: 2023–present

YouTube information
- Channel: Slushy Noobz
- Genres: Vlog; gaming
- Subscribers: 1.73 million
- Views: 312 million
- Last updated: November 22, 2026
- Website: slushynoobz.com

Slushy Noobz is a Canadian YouTube channel composed of Hamzah Al-Emad (born March 5, 2002) and Martin Andrijasevic (born March 25, 1999). The duo, based in Toronto, originally became popular separately on TikTok, starting the channel together in 2023.

== Early life ==
Hamzah Al-Emad was born in Sanaa, Yemen, in his grandfather's living room. Al-Emad later moved to Tulsa, Oklahoma, in the U.S., where his father received a degree, and then attended a K-8 school in Makanda, Illinois. At the age of seventeen, Al-Emad crossed the border in Montreal and moved to Calgary, Alberta, due to concerns over his immigration status in the U.S. He did not pursue university studies but moved to Toronto, where he established a management company. He became a Canadian citizen in 2026.

Martin Andrijasevic was born in Edmonton, Alberta, and is of Croatian heritage. Andrijasevic attended a French Catholic school during his early education. In his youth, he and his family moved to Ottawa, where he and his younger brother, Tomas Andrijasevic, created home videos. He later attended Carleton University, majoring in computer science with a minor in math, and played varsity water polo. Although Andrijasevic had hoped to work for Google or Amazon, he instead became a programmer for the Canadian government and casually did TikTok on the side.

== Career ==
Before creating the Slushy Noobz YouTube channel, Al-Emad was an established TikTok content creator. He was part of the group 4freakshow during the COVID-19 pandemic, collaborating with Haley Sharpe, Chase Rutherford, and Claire Drake. Together, they livestreamed Zoom calls on Twitch, and clips from these sessions gained traction on TikTok. In April 2021, Al-Emad launched the podcast, Out of Character, on YouTube, which initially ran as a solo podcast featuring interviews with various internet personalities.

Martin Andrijasevic started his social media career by posting satirical comedy skits on TikTok in 2020, progressing to solo streaming on Twitch in 2021. The following year, he connected with Hamzah Al-Emad on TikTok, which led to them livestreaming together.

Al-Emad and Andrijasevic met in person in Toronto when Andrijasevic stayed over at Al-Emad's house to attend an EDM festival. After that, Al-Emad convinced Andrijasevic to move from Ottawa to Toronto, so they could make content together more regularly.

=== Slushy Noobz ===
Slushy Noobz was created in May 2023. The channel’s name came from inputting the prompt "make a name for a gaming channel involving the meme 'wocky slush'" into ChatGPT. The content featured on Slushy Noobz includes a variety of formats, such as gaming videos, vlogs, mukbangs, and more.

The channel gained significant traction in 2024, especially in the months before its hiatus on December 25. Before this hiatus, Slushy Noobz hosted their first livestream, during which the duo shaved their heads to celebrate the end of No Shave November. On December 7, 2024, the channel held its first meet-and-greet event, giving fans the opportunity to take photos with Martin Andrijasevic and his fiancée Mandy, along with Hamzah Al-Emad, all dressed in Christmas costumes.

Alongside the meet-and-greet, the channel launched a video series dubbed “Slushmas,” featuring a mix of holiday-themed and gaming content in a countdown to Christmas. Following “Slushmas,” Slushy Noobz announced an indefinite hiatus via their Instagram account.

They announced their return in late January 2025, when posters began appearing across Toronto to promote an upcoming art exhibition by Slushy Noobz, curated by Chase Rutherford. The promotional posters drew inspiration from the posters for a 1985 art exhibition featuring Andy Warhol and Jean-Michel Basquiat. Slushy Noobz shared behind-the-scenes footage of Hamzah Al-Emad and Martin Andrijasevic creating the exhibition artwork on their shared TikTok account.

Slushy Noobz officially returned from their hiatus on February 5, 2025, with a YouTube livestream titled “Hamzah vs Martin Weigh In.” The video announced their live boxing match on February 8, an officially sanctioned bout by Boxing Ontario. The match was livestreamed exclusively on YouTube as “Hamzah vs Martin,” and tickets for an official viewing party in Toronto were available online. Yvette Raposo, Chase Rutherford, and iDubbbz provided commentary, while Kelly Korkola, Richard Casanova, and Howard Nguyen judged. Additionally, Lyla Simon served as referee, Aldo as ring announcer, and Nora Fawn as ring girl. After the match, Al-Emad and Andrijasevic surprised attendees by appearing at the viewing party and hosting a press conference where fans could ask questions. Al-Emad won the match after three rounds.

In June 2026, they embarked on a month-long, cross-country tour of Canada, inspired by the IRL streams of streamer IShowSpeed. Livestreamed directly to YouTube, these 4-6 hour livestreams took place in unlikely cities ranging from Dawson City, Yukon, to Orwell, PEI.

=== Slushy Noobz Patreon ===
Launched on February 8, 2025, the Slushy Noobz Patreon was announced after their boxing match livestream. The first exclusive content for Patreon members was a two-part documentary, Slushy Noobz Out of Character. Slushy Noobz Creative Director Chase Rutherford began filming behind-the-scenes Patreon content in July 2024. Part 1 covers the period leading up to “Slushmas” through July, while Part 2 focuses on activities during the hiatus and culminates in the boxing match.

As an additional perk for Patreon subscribers, a Discord server named “SlushyCord” was introduced. In May 2025, Slushy Noobz expanded their Patreon benefits by launching a Minecraft server called “SlushyCraft” exclusively for their subscribers.

As of 2026, the Patreon membership includes:

- Slushy Noobz Out of Character (Parts 1 and 2)
- Slushy Noobz Canada Tour (Documentary and livestream VODS)
- 3 gaming long plays per month
- 1 behind-the-scenes video per month
- SlushyCord access
- SlushyCraft access

=== Out of Character ===
The Out of Character podcast debuted on YouTube in April 2021 as a solo podcast recorded in Hamzah Al-Emad’s grandma’s basement. In March 2022, he introduced a paid Patreon version alongside the free YouTube version. In October 2023, Al-Emad expanded the podcast into a co-hosted format with Martin Andrijasevic, while continuing to release solo episodes on Patreon. However, Al-Emad ended his solo Out of Character Patreon in January 2026 to focus on larger projects. The Patreon page now serves as an archive.

In June 2026, the duo announced that the podcast had joined iHeartMedia and Will Ferrell’s Big Money Players podcast network, with episodes released every Sunday.
