= Shawnee Hills AVA =

American Viticultural Area in Illinois

Coordinates: 37°34′56″N 89°06′45″W

Shawnee Hills
- Wine region
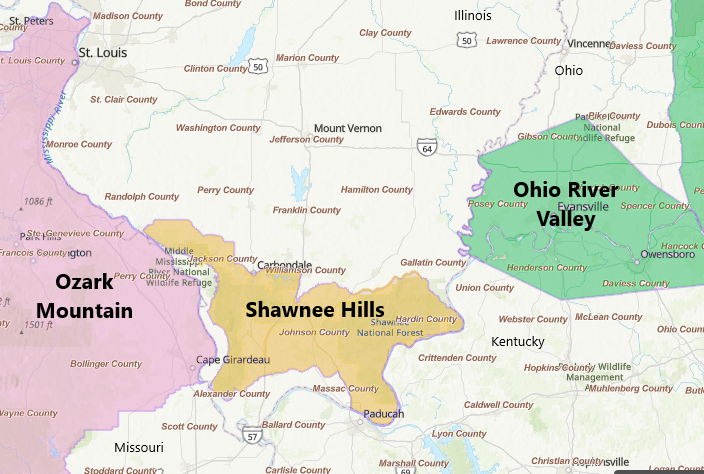
- Type: American Viticultural Area
- Year established: 2006
- Years of wine industry: 166
- Country: United States
- Part of: Illinois
- Growing season: 150–214 days
- Climate region: Region IV-V
- Heat units: 3,770 GDD units
- Precipitation (annual average): 47.83 in (1,215 mm)
- Soil conditions: Thin loess with or without residuum on limestone or interbedded sandstone, siltstone and shale
- Total area: 1,370,000 acres (2,140 sq mi)
- Size of planted vineyards: 300 acres (120 ha)
- No. of vineyards: 55
- Grapes produced: Cabernet Franc, Chambourcin, Chancellor, Chardonel, Frontenac, Riesling, Traminette
- No. of wineries: 18

Shawnee Hills (/ˈʃɔːniː/ shah-nee) is an American Viticultural Area (AVA) in the state of Illinois located between the Mississippi River and the Ohio River in the state's southern region. The wine appellation encompasses over 2,140 square miles (1,370,000 acres) across segments of Alexander, Gallatin, Hardin, Jackson, Johnson, Pope, Pulaski, Randolph, Saline, Union, and Williamson counties. It was established as the nation's 185^{th} and the state's initial AVA on November 27, 2006 by the Alcohol and Tobacco Tax and Trade Bureau (TTB), Treasury after reviewing the petition submitted by Dr. Theodore F. Wichmann, president of Owl Creek Vineyard, Inc., and Dr. Imed Dami, an Illinois State Viticulturist, on behalf of themselves, the Illinois Grape Growers and Vintner's Association, and the Illinois Grape and Wine Resource Council, proposing a viticultural area in southern Illinois named "Shawnee Hills."
The appellation stretches approximately 80 miles (130 km) on an east–west axis by 20 miles (32 km) north-south and includes the vast majority of the Shawnee National Forest. The area is named after the Shawnee, an indigenous people that settled in southern Illinois during the mid-18th century. The Shawnee Hills Wine Trail was created by the owners of the first three wineries in southern Illinois to promote the state's enotourism.

== History ==
The Shawnee Indian Nation, led by Chief Tecumseh and his brother, The Prophet, occupied the southern Illinois hill country in the early 1800s in an attempt to stem the flow of European settlers from the east. As a result, the Shawnee name became attached to the hills, and academic and State government publications document the continued use of the name. For example, the book Land Between the Rivers (C.W. Horrell, et al., 1973), describes the region as follows:

South of the Mount Vernon hill country you come next to the Shawnee Hills [which mark] the southernmost limit of the prehistoric ice sheets. The Shawnee Hills culminate in Shawneetown Ridge, a heavily timbered wilderness of bluffs and knobs reaching up to an elevation of over a thousand feet, with rocky cliffs towering hundreds of feet above the valley floor. The Shawnee Hills are the heart of Southern llinois and the 204,000 acres (319 sq mi) Shawnee National Forest.

People have raised grapes in southern Illinois and the Shawnee Hills since 1860, according Grape Culture by W.E. Gould (1891). The region contained 1,250 acres (510 ha) of vineyards in 1890, and vintners produced 19,750 US gallons (74,800 L) of wine in 1891, citing Grape and Wine Production in Illinois from 1983 to Present, by R.M. Skirvin, et al., in "Illinois Grape Growers and Vintners Association Conference Proceedings" (2000). At the outset, there were eight wineries and 51 vineyards with approximately 160 acres (65 ha) planted to wine varietals within the Shawnee Hills viticultural area, citing 1999 Grape Growers and Vintner's Survey, in "Illinois Grape Growers and Vintners Association Conference Proceedings" (2000).

The Illinois State Geological Survey map Landforms of Illinois (1980) labels the hills within the viticultural area as the Shawnee Hills. In addition, an Illinois Department of Natural Resources brochure titled Illinois' Natural Divisions and Biodiversity (April 2002) describes the State's 14 unique natural regions. These regions are based upon such natural features as topology, geology, soils, and climate, as well as their unique flora and fauna. According to the brochure, the Shawnee Hills natural region consists of two sections, the Greater and the Lesser Shawnee Hills. "Shawnee" also appears in many other political and geographic names within the viticultural area, including Shawneetown, Shawneetown Ridge, and the Shawnee National Forest, which lies largely within the area. Furthermore, five wineries within the viticultural area formed the Shawnee Hills Wine Trail in 1996, which is described in a brochure of the same name. According to the petition, the names "Shawnee Hills" and "Shawnee Hills Wine Trail" have been used numerous times in other national, state, and local publications.

== Terroir ==
=== Topography ===
Elevation is the most obvious feature distinguishing the Shawnee Hills from surrounding areas. As shown on the Paducah; Kentucky: Illinois-Missouri-Indiana USGS map (1987) submitted with the petition, the Shawnee Hills range from 400 to 800 feet (120–240 m) higher in elevation than the glaciated land to the north and the river delta land to the south. Most of the highest elevations in Illinois, many above 1,000 feet (300 m), are in the Shawnee Hills. Spectacular hills and ridges and a unique mesoclimate characterize the Shawnee Hills viticultural area. Nearly all vineyards in the Shawnee Hills viticultural area are on ridge tops and bench lands ranging between 600 and 900 feet (180 and 270 m) in elevation. As such, the commercial vineyards in the Shawnee Hills area have experienced little or no spring frost or winter freeze injury. An additional benefit of the Shawnee Hills topography, the petition notes, is the enhanced air circulation caused by constant summer breezes, allowing faster drying of vineyard leaves and fruit clusters following rain, thus minimizing the risk of fungal infections in an otherwise humid, wet climate. In contrast, the Mt. Vernon Hill County region immediately to the north of the Shawnee Hills was glaciated, and, as a result, is 400 to 500 feet (120–150 m) lower in elevation than the Shawnee Hills, according to the petition, which adds that the Mt. Vernon region is relatively flatter with no high ridges, cliffs, or gorges. The topography of the Mt. Vernon Hill Country as "rolling farmland." The Cairo Delta area to the south of the Shawnee Hills is lower still, averaging about 300 to 400 feet (91–122 m) in elevation, with an extremely flat topography that is often totally flooded by the Mississippi, Ohio, Wabash, and Cache Rivers, which all converge there. This delta region comprises all of the land in Illinois south of the Shawnee Hills. Horrell describes this area as follows:

Beyond Shawneetown Ridge the land drops away in gentle foothills to the low-lying swamps and lakes along the Cache River — the ancient bed of the Ohio River. Beyond Cache Valley you come to the flood plain of the Ohio River itself. Two similar flood plains border Southern Illinois on the east and west, forming the banks of the Wabash and Mississippi rivers.

=== Geology ===
The geological characteristics of Shawnee Hills are a distinguishing feature. The Illinois Geological Survey, compiled by H.B. William, et al.. (1967), as cited in the petition, notes that the backbone of the Shawnee Hills is the Shawneetown Ridge, a high ridge of Pennsylvanian, Caseyville Formation Battery Rock sandstone up to 600 feet (180 m) thick, which runs east to west from the Ohio River south of the village of Shawneetown to the Mississippi River near the town of Chester. This rock is very obvious in the ridge's south-facing bluffs, as well as along the north–south roads cut through it. The ridge's northern slope consists primarily of Pennsylvanian, Abbott Formation, Grindstaff sandstone up to 350 feet (110 m) thick. The southern slope consists primarily of Mississippian Upper Chesterian, Grove Church shale up to 65 feet (20 m) thick, and Kinkaid Limestone, which is 110 to 180 feet (34–55 m) thick. The bluffs above the Mississippi River consist primarily of Lower Devonian Clear Creek chert and Backbone limestone. This underlying mixture of sandstone, chert, and limestone gives the Shawnee Hills a Karst-like topography, honeycombed with sinkholes and limestone caves feeding many surface springs, the petition states. One of the few such areas in Illinois, the petition notes that this combination of steep slopes, rock fissures, sink holes, and caves provides the viticultural area with superior surface and ground water drainage in a region that often has excessive rainfall, 38 to 46 in (970–1,170 mm) annually. In contrast, the petition notes, the Mt. Vernon Hill Country to the north of the Shawnee Hills was totally glaciated, resulting in lower elevations, flatter topography, and a different geology. The southern portion of the Mt. Vernon Hill Country consists primarily of Pennsylvanian, Spoon Formation, Curlew limestone layered with DeKoren and Davis coal, as well as Carbondale Formation, Piasa limestone with number 2, 5, and 6 coals. The northern part of the Mt. Vernon Hill Country area consists primarily of Modesto Formation Shoal Creek limestone 200 to 500 ft (61–152 m) thick with number 7 and 8 coal throughout, as well as Bond Formation, Millersville limestone 100 to 350 ft (30–107 m) thick. Horrell describes this area as "a great crescent stretching southeast from Randolph and Perry counties to Gallatin county, where coal beds come so close to the surface that they have made this the most heavily mined region in the state." Also in contrast, the Cairo Delta area south of the Shawnee Hills was flattened by water from both glacial melt and the tremendous flow and flooding of the two largest rivers in the country—the Mississippi and the Ohio, which eroded and replaced rock with clay, sand, and gravel. According to the Illinois State Geological Survey, the northern part of the delta area consists of Cretaceous, Gulfian McNary sand, and Tuscaloesa gravel. The southern part of the delta region consists of Paleocene and Eocene Wilcox Formation, Porters Creek clay 75 to 150 feet (23–46 m) thick.

=== Climate ===
Another distinguishing factor of the Shawnee Hills viticultural area, according to the petitioners, is its climate. While the Shawnee Hills area generally has a continental climate, as does all of the Midwestern United States, the hills climatically separate the upper Midwest from the South. The Shawnee Hills region is warmer than the adjacent areas to the north but cooler than the adjacent areas to the south, which are often too hot in the summer to grow quality grapes. This climate provides a longer growing season for ripening late varieties of grapes, higher degree-days for optimum ripeness, and fewer winter occurrences of below-zero degree Fahrenheit temperatures, which can kill buds and damage wood on many grape varieties, according to the petition. As evidence of this unique climate, the petition included data from the Midwestern Climate Center for Mt. Vernon, Anna, and Cairo, Illinois. Anna is located within the Shawnee Hills viticultural area; Mt. Vernon, which is within the Mt. Vernon Hill Country region, is approximately 50 miles (80 km) north of Anna; while Cairo, which is within the Cairo Delta region, is approximately 35 miles (56 km) south of Anna. The petition compares Shawnee Hills, Mt. Vernon, and Cairo temperature data. It shows Shawnee Hills could be classified as a mid-Region IV climate in the Winkler heat summation climate classification system, with 3,770 growing degree-days. (During the growing season, one degree day accumulates for each degree Fahrenheit that a day's median temperature is above 50 °F (10 °C), which is the minimum temperature required for grapevine growth.
For Shawnee Hills viticultural area, average temperatures are highest from mid-June to mid-August during early ripening; then the temperatures taper off in September and October, which is the period of late ripening and harvest. Typically, the area experiences warm days and cool nights from late August to October. Growing season data from 1961 to 1990, which the petitioners provided, described the length of growing season for the three areas (Mt. Vernon, Anna, and Cairo). For Shawnee Hills, the median last spring frost occurs by April 10. In 10 percent of the years, the last frost occurred after April 23. North of this area, the median last spring frost occurs in mid-April, with 10 percent occurring after May 2. Since bud break generally occurs during the second week of April, areas to the north of the Shawnee Hills often experience more bud and shoot damage due to late frost. Also, since the first frost in the fall occurs one to three weeks later in the Shawnee Hills than in areas to the north, late varieties such as Chambourcin and Norton ripen more fully before leaf drop. Because the Midwestern United States is a continental climate, one of the limiting factors in growing quality wine grapes is dormant wood and buddamage due to extreme cold temperatures in the winter. Data also shows that the Shawnee Hills area averages 81 days below 30 °F (−1 °C) and 1.8 days below 0 degrees Fahrenheit each year. The region immediately to the north averages 104 days below 30 °F (−1 °C) and 3.5 days below 0 degrees Fahrenheit. One or two days of extreme cold can mean the difference between a full crop and healthy wood, and a partial crop and damaged wood.

Rainfall does not appear to be a distinguishing feature for the Shawnee Hills viticultural area, the area's drainage capacity does differ from that of surrounding areas. Because of its well-drained soils, steep topography, and limestone base, the Shawnee Hills can shed excess water more quickly and completely than adjacent areas. In the Shawnee Hills area, most precipitation occurs in the spring months of March through May. The driest months are generally September and October, which receive an average of only 2 to 3 inches (51–76 mm) per month. Although the area receives excessive rainfall on an annual basis, 47.83 in (1,215 mm), the growing season and the harvest months are more moderate in terms of rainfall. The drier harvest months allow grapes to develop more intensity in flavor, color, sugar, and acid. In most years, the petition states, the Shawnee Hills vineyards produce wine grapes that are very well balanced relative to these quality parameters. The USDA plant hardiness zones range from 6b to 7b.

=== Soil ===
While noting that soils vary in the Shawnee Hills region, the petitioners provided a general description contrasting the soils of the area with the soils of adjacent areas. As noted on the General Soil Map of Illinois, prepared by J.B. Fehrenbacher (1982), the soils in the Shawnee Hills viticultural area are, generally, class XIII and class XIV, which tend to be thin loess with or without residuum on limestone or interbedded sandstone, siltstone, and shale. The main soils are Alford, Hosmer, Wellston, and Zanesville. All of these soils are light colored, moderately developed, and moderately well drained. The western and southern parts of the area tend to have deeper soils, 12-to-20-foot thick (3.7–6.1 m), on limestone. The central and northern parts of the area tend to have soil that is 20 to 48 inches (51–122 cm) thick on sandstone, siltstone, and shale. The primary viticultural advantage of the soils within the Shawnee Hills is that they are moderately well drained and are of low fertility. Soil drainage in the Shawnee Hills area is moderate to excellent. In this area of Karst topography, the loess soils, which tend to erode easily, are very good for quality vines and grapes. However, the best vineyard sites within the Shawnee Hills viticultural area are on flat ridge tops and bench lands with deep soils that are not highly eroded. In contrast, the soil north of the Shawnee Hills in the Mt. Vernon Hill Country are class II, which are primarily thick loess 30 to 70 inches (76–178 cm) on Illinois drift. The main soils are Stoy, Weir, Bluford, Wynoose, Colp, and Del Rey. These soils tend to be much deeper than those in the Shawnee Hills, as well as more fertile but with poorer drainage. In general, these soils are more suited to growing such crops as corn and soybeans, which are the primary crops of the Mt. Vernon Hill Country, than to growing apples, peaches, and grapes, which are the primary crops in the Shawnee Hills area. The soils south of the Shawnee Hills in the Cairo Delta, according to the petition, are primarily class XV, which are sandy to clay alluvial sediments on bottomlands. The soils include Lawson, Sawmill, Darwin, Haymond, Perrolia, and Karnak. These soils tend to be poorly developed and poorly drained.

== Viticulture ==
=== Wineries ===
Southern Illinois is divided into four separate wine regions: Northern Region, Western Region, Shawnee Hills Wine Trail and Southern Illinois Wine Trail. At least 20 wineries as well as additional vineyards produced wine and grow grapes within the Shawnee Hills AVA. Most of the wineries are located along the Shawnee Hills Wine Trail, south of Route 13 and west of Interstate 57, in the southwestern portion of the viticulturaL area. The Southern Illinois Wine Trail region, east of I-57, contains the next largest grouping, as well as some wineries located just outside the AVA boundary. The area around Kinkaid Lake in the northwestern corner of the AVA is also seeing a number of new wineries develop. As of 2025, the Illinois Grape Growers and Vintners Alliance (IGGVA) promotes five wine trails in the state; Carlyle Lake, Heart of Illinois, Mississippi Valley, Shawnee Hills, and Wabash Valley Wine Trails.

=== Economics ===
As early as 1999, the Illinois Grape and Wine Resources Council estimated the Shawnee Hills Wine Trail products provided more than $1 million boost to the area economy. By 2001, the wine trail had grown to five wineries producing more than 150,000 bottles. In November 2010, Gary Orlandini Vineyards used "leaps and bounds" to describe the growth of the wine trail, explaining the wineries along the trail had averaged 28 percent annual growth since the mid-1990s when the trail was organized.

The development of the wineries has also boosted the region's hospitality industry with around four dozen specialty lodging facilities; bed and breakfast inns, cabins, vacation and Airbnb rentals; all but the state-owned Giant City Lodge and others opening in the last 15 years. These did not include the new motels and hotels in Carbondale, Illinois, on the north edge of the wine trail.

Research from around 2010 showed that approximately 40 percent of the visitors to the wine trail were non-local (defined as coming from at least 50 miles away). Tourists attracted to the wine trail tended to be older and possessed a higher household income than local wine visitors. Sixty-five percent of the tourists were between the ages of 32 and 59, and another 15 percent were 60 or older. Also, 65 percent had household incomes above $75,000.

== See also ==
- Blue Sky Vineyards
- Owl Creek Vineyard
