= Bald Knob Cross =

Monument in Illinois, USA

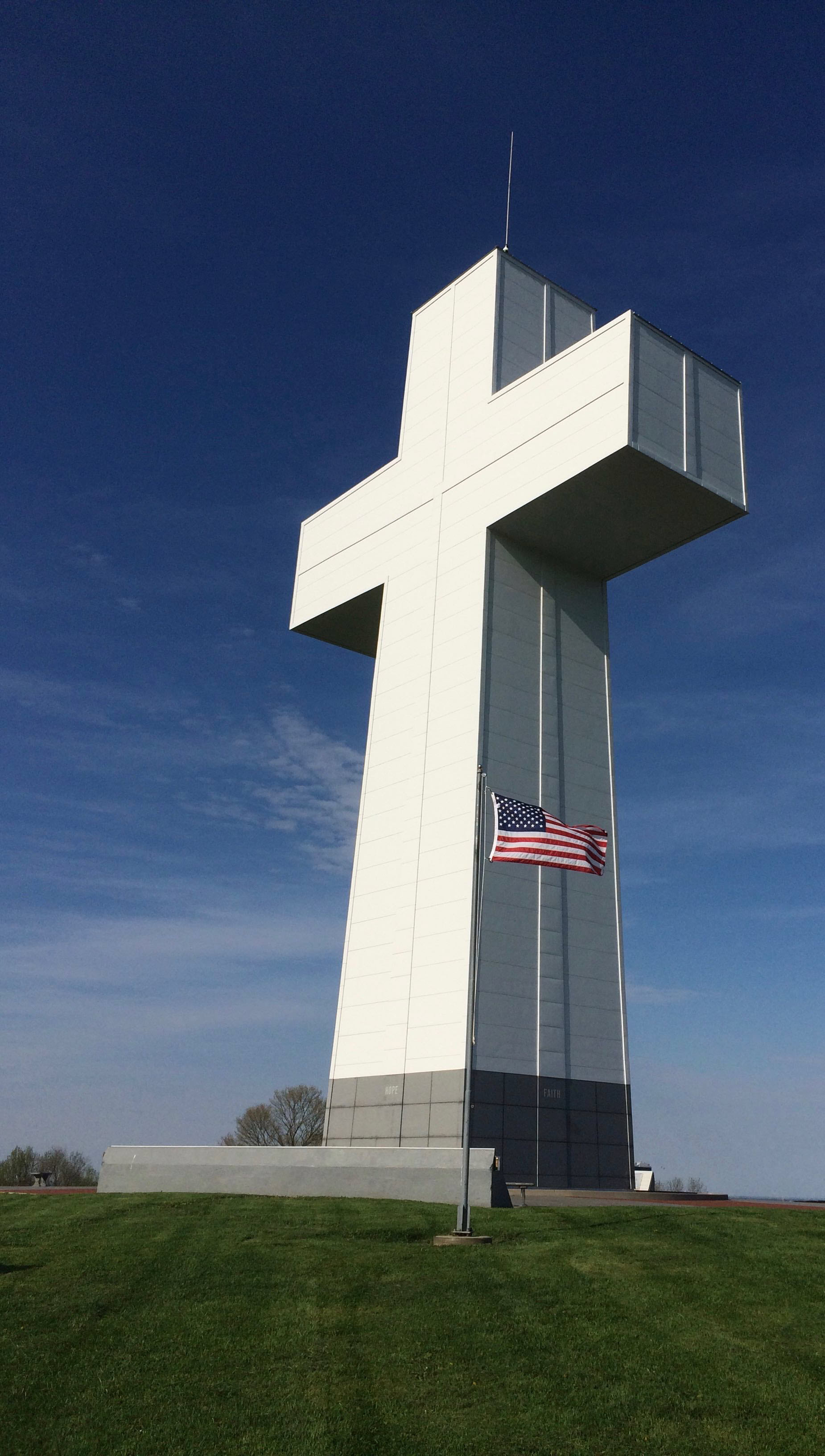
Bald Knob Cross rises high above the Shawnee National Forest west of Alto Pass, Illinois, USA.

Bald Knob Cross, officially known as the Bald Knob Cross of Peace, is a large white cross located in Alto Pass, Illinois, United States. The structure is 111 feet (34 m) tall. The base of the cross is 1,034 feet above sea level and overlooks the Shawnee National Forest. Originally completed in 1963, the cross itself stands 111 feet tall, is 22 feet square at the base, 16 feet square at the top and its arms extend 63 feet horizontally. The exterior white panels covering the cross are 4-inch architectural flat insulated metal panels while the base portion is covered in granite approximately 4-inches thick. The structure sits on a foundation of 730 tons of reinforced concrete that goes down 20 feet to bedrock. The steel framework weighs approximately 170 tons. Each of the four sides of the cross have a word inscribed into the granite: Peace, Hope, Faith, Charity.

Bald Knob Mountain was first suggested as an excellent site for a sunrise Easter service by Wayman Presley and Rev. William Lirely after the 1936 Easter service. The first such service was held in 1937, with 250 attendees, and has been held annually since. From 1984 to 1986 there was a Passion Play held in conjunction with the Easter service.

After the site was acquired, the Cross was built in stages with money from various fundraisers, the most famous of which was that of Myrta Clutts.

Flight students from Southern Illinois University often use the cross as a landmark because it is visible from such a great distance.

In 2006, a legal dispute arose among the board members of the Cross. A two-year court battle ensued. All members of the organization were banned by court order from access to the grounds. During the legal wrangling, several community members formed the Friends of the Cross organization to raise funds for the eventual restoration of the Cross, which was falling into gross disrepair. The litigation was resolved on Christmas Eve, 2008, when all sides in the dispute signed an agreement to drop all charges and submit their own resignations from the Board of Directors if the court would delegate leadership of the organization to a two-year Transitional Board of Directors, made up mostly from Pastors in various communities and counties in the region. The Transitional Board met for their first meeting on Friday, January 16, 2009, when they elected officers.

The Board placed the organization back on firm legal and financial footing, and a group called Friends of the Cross raised funds to totally restore the cross. Many improvements have since been made to the grounds, remodeling a welcome center/gift shop, adding an observation deck, along with other amenities.

The Bald Knob Cross adjoins the Bald Knob Wilderness, a federally designated U.S. wilderness area covering the western slope of the mountain which the cross surmounts.
