= Makanda, Illinois =

- Village
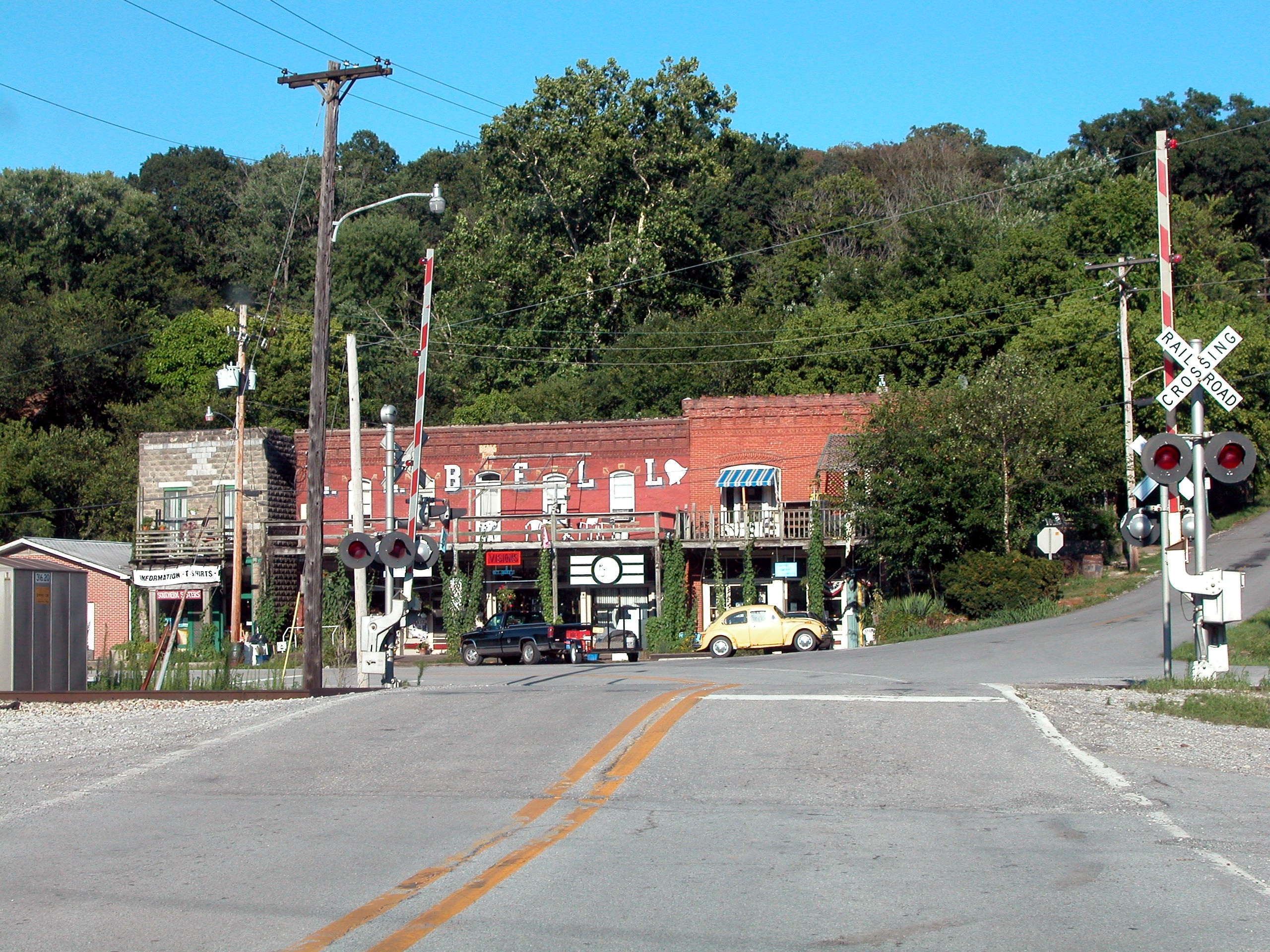
- A railroad crossing in Makanda

- Location of Makanda in Jackson County, Illinois.
- Coordinates: 37°37′42″N 89°14′35″W
- Country: United States
- State: Illinois
- County: Jackson
- Township: Makanda

Area
  - Total: 5.33 sq mi (13.81 km^{2})
  - Land: 5.28 sq mi (13.68 km^{2})
  - Water: 0.050 sq mi (0.13 km^{2})
- Elevation: 676 ft (206 m)

Population (2020)
  - Total: 547
  - Density: 103.6/sq mi (39.99/km^{2})
- Time zone: UTC-6 (CST)
  - Summer (DST): UTC-5 (CDT)
- ZIP code: 62958
- Area code: 618
- FIPS code: 17-46214
- GNIS feature ID: 2399228
- Website: villageofmakanda.com

Makanda (/mə.ˈkæn.də/ muh-KAN-duh) is a village in Jackson County, Illinois, United States. As of the 2020 United States census, the population was 547, down from 561 in 2010. In the early 20th Century it used the slogan "Star of Egypt."

Makanda is part of the Carbondale, Illinois Micropolitan Statistical Area.

== History ==
The village was named after Makanda, a local Native American chieftain.

After Lincoln's inauguration, Theodore and Al Thompson flew the Union flag from a tree atop a hill between Makanda and Cobden in defiance of the Knights of the Golden Circle, a secessionist group that operated throughout the Midwest.

In 2019, citizens of Makanda rallied against the Illinois Central Railroad Company after an announcement of a tower set to be built in the downtown area and a registered flood plain.

After former U.S. Senator Paul Simon died in 2003, Makanda added a "bow tie" to the smiley face water tower to honor Simon.

== Geography ==
According to the 2021 census gazetteer files, Makanda has a total area of 5.33 square miles (13.80 km^{2}), of which 5.28 square miles (13.68 km^{2}) (or 99.04%) is land and 0.05 square miles (0.13 km^{2}) (or 0.96%) is water.

== Demographics ==
Historical population
Census	Pop.	Note	%±
1890	344		—
1900	528		53.5%
1910	400		−24.2%
1920	310		−22.5%
1930	262		−15.5%
1940	258		−1.5%
1950	214		−17.1%
1960	164		−23.4%
1970	176		7.3%
1980	402		128.4%
1990	404		0.5%
2000	419		3.7%
2010	561		33.9%
2020	547		−2.5%
U.S. Decennial Census

As of the 2020 census there were 547 people, 195 households, and 139 families residing in the village. The population density was 102.59 inhabitants per square mile (39.61/km^{2}). There were 256 housing units at an average density of 48.01 per square mile (18.54/km^{2}). The racial makeup of the village was 79.71% White, 4.02% African American, 0.37% Native American, 9.32% Asian, 0.00% Pacific Islander, 0.91% from other races, and 5.67% from two or more races. Hispanic or Latino of any race were 1.28% of the population.

There were 195 households, out of which 23.1% had children under the age of 18 living with them, 56.92% were married couples living together, 13.33% had a female householder with no husband present, and 28.72% were non-families. 23.59% of all households were made up of individuals, and 8.72% had someone living alone who was 65 years of age or older. The average household size was 3.24 and the average family size was 2.77.

The village's age distribution consisted of 22.0% under the age of 18, 3.0% from 18 to 24, 19.8% from 25 to 44, 37.7% from 45 to 64, and 17.6% who were 65 years of age or older. The median age was 47.0 years. For every 100 females, there were 119.0 males. For every 100 females age 18 and over, there were 143.9 males.

The median income for a household in the village was $68,958, and the median income for a family was $81,146. Males had a median income of $47,500 versus $41,125 for females. The per capita income for the village was $38,688. About 5.8% of families and 11.6% of the population were below the poverty line, including none of those under age 18 and 12.6% of those age 65 or over.

== Education ==
It is in the Unity Point Community Consolidated School District 140 and the Carbondale Community High School District 165.

== Arts and culture ==
- Makanda Spring Fest, an annual two-day event featuring local artists and live music.
- Makanda Vulture Fest, an annual two-day event held during the third weekend in October that celebrates the migration of the black vulture and turkey vulture to the region.
- Total solar eclipses: The center lines of the paths of the solar eclipse of August 21, 2017 and the solar eclipse of April 8, 2024 crossed in Makanda. Tens of thousands of spectators were expected to flock to Makanda and surroundings to witness the 2017 eclipse.
- Historic Boardwalk located downtown is home to local artisan retail shops

== Notable people ==
- Hamzah Al-Emad, Yemeni-American YouTuber
- Wayman Presley, Rural mail carrier and founder of the Bald Knob Cross
- Jeanne Hurley Simon, Illinois state legislator
- Paul Simon, U.S. Senator and 1988 Democratic presidential candidate
- Sheila Simon, 46th lieutenant governor of Illinois
