= Cabernet Franc =

Variety of black grape

- Grape (Vitis)
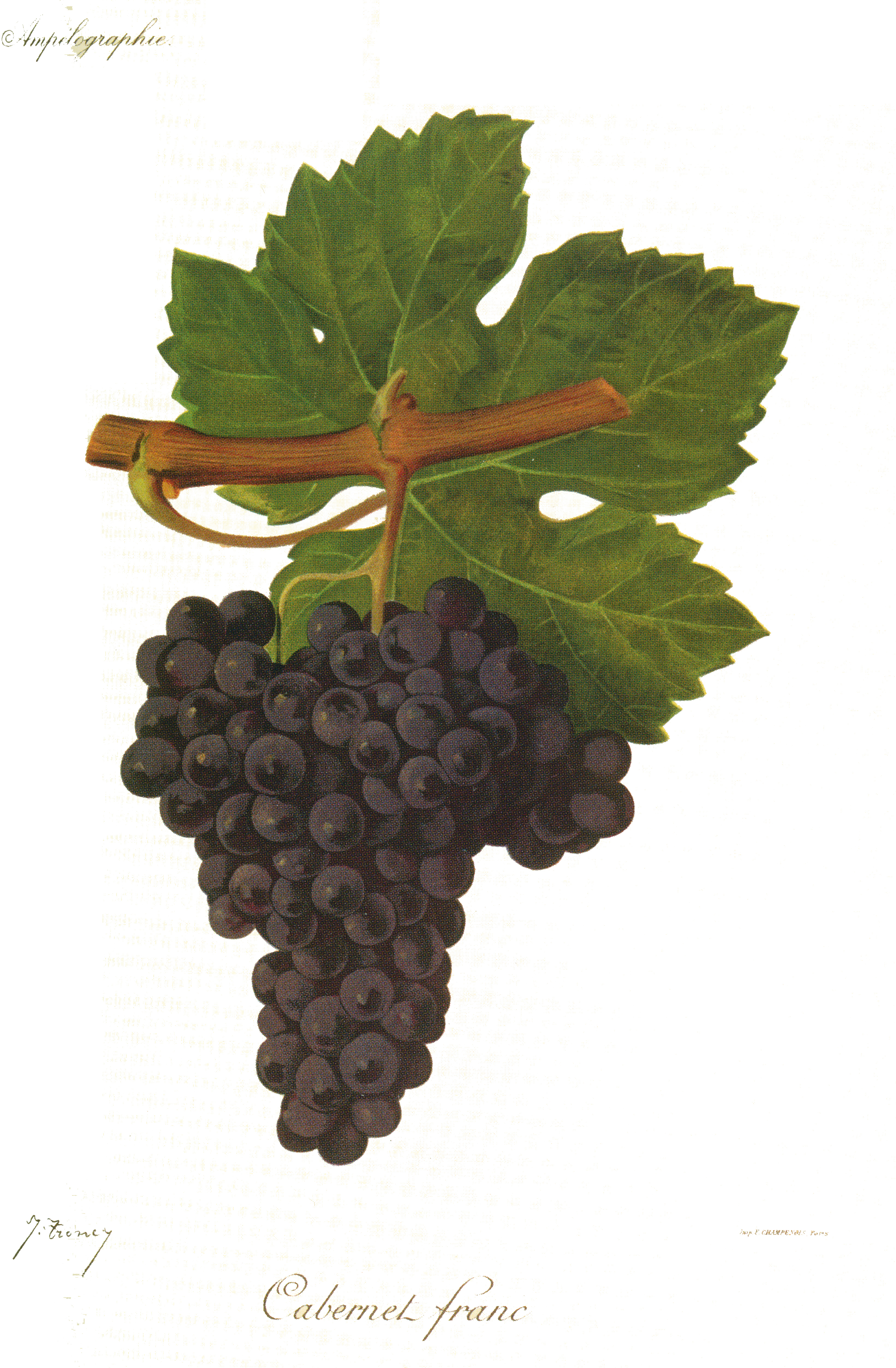
- Cabernet Franc in Viala & Vermorel
- Color of berry skin: Blue-black
- Species: Vitis vinifera
- Also called: Bouchet, Bouchy, Breton (more)
- Origin: Bordeaux, France
- Notable regions: Bordeaux, Loire
- Notable wines: Château Cheval Blanc
- VIVC number: 1927

Cabernet Franc is one of the major black grape varieties worldwide. It is principally grown for blending with Cabernet Sauvignon and Merlot in the Bordeaux style, but can also be vinified alone, as in the Loire's Chinon. In addition to being used in blends and produced as a varietal in Canada, Lake Erie AVA in Pennsylvania, and across the United States and Argentina, it is sometimes made into ice wine in those regions.

Cabernet Franc is lighter than Cabernet Sauvignon, making a bright pale red wine that contributes finesse and lends a peppery perfume to blends with more robust grapes. Depending on the growing region and style of wine, additional aromas can include tobacco, raspberry, bell pepper, cassis, and violets.

Records of Cabernet Franc in Bordeaux go back to the end of the 18th century, although it was planted in Loire long before that time. DNA analysis indicates that Cabernet Franc is one of two parents of Cabernet Sauvignon, Merlot, and Carménère.

== History ==
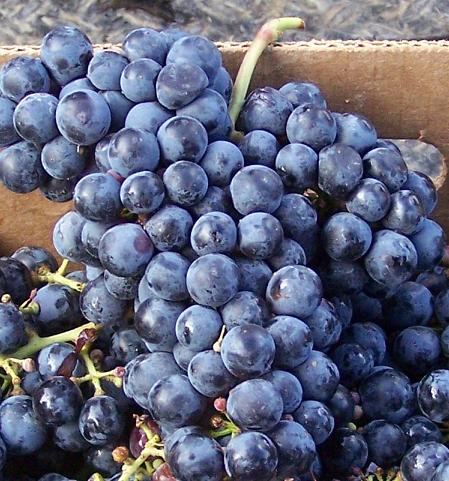
Cabernet Franc grapes

Cabernet Franc is believed to have been established in the Libournais region of southwest France sometime in the 17th century, when Cardinal Richelieu transported cuttings of the vine to the Loire Valley. They were planted at the Abbey of Bourgueil under the care of an abbot named Breton, whose name became associated with the grape. By the 18th century, plantings of Cabernet Franc (known as Bouchet) were found throughout Fronsac, Pomerol and St-Emilion, making quality wines. As Cabernet Sauvignon grew more popular in the 18th and 19th centuries, the close similarity of the two grapes was observed and theories emerged as to the extent of their relationship. In 1997, DNA evidence emerged to show that Cabernet Franc had crossed with Sauvignon blanc to produce Cabernet Sauvignon.

== Viticulture ==
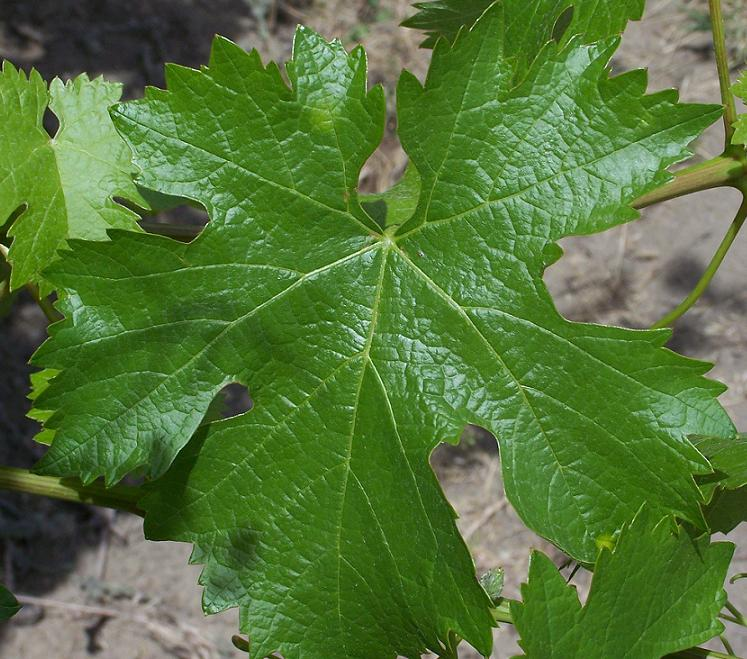
Cabernet Franc leaf

In general, Cabernet Franc is very similar to Cabernet Sauvignon, but buds and ripens at least a week earlier. This trait allows the vine to thrive in slightly cooler climates than Cabernet Sauvignon, such as the Loire Valley. In Bordeaux, plantings of Cabernet Franc are treated as an "insurance policy" against inclement weather close to harvest that may damage plantings of Cabernet Sauvignon. Its early budding does pose the viticultural hazard of coulure early in the growing season. The vine is vigorous and upright, with dark-green, 5-lobed leaves. The winged bunches are elongated and small-medium in size. The berries are quite small and blue-black in color, with fairly thin skins. The Cabernet Franc grapevine is more prone to mutation than Cabernet Sauvignon, less so than Pinot noir.

Cabernet Franc can adapt to a wide variety of vineyard soil types but seems to thrive in sandy, chalk soils, producing heavier, more full bodied wines there. In the Loire Valley, terroir based differences can be perceived between wines made from grapes grown in gravel terraces versus tuffeau slopes. The grape is highly yield sensitive, with over-cropping producing wines with more green, vegetal notes.

== Wine regions ==
Across the world Cabernet Franc is one of the twenty most widely planted grape varieties. Plantings are found throughout Europe, in the New World, China and Kazakhstan. In many regions, it is planted as a component of a Bordeaux-style blend such as Meritage, playing secondary role to Cabernet Sauvignon and Merlot. In parts of northeast Italy, Anjou-Saumur, Touraine and the right bank region of Bordeaux, Cabernet Franc both plays a more prominent role in blends and is vinted as a varietal.

=== France ===
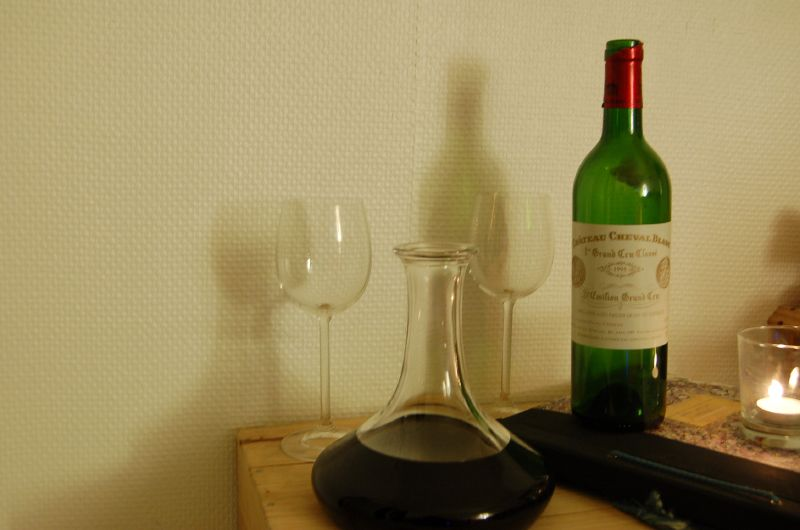
Cabernet Franc is a significant contributor to the character of the Bordeaux wine Chateau Cheval Blanc from St-Emilion.

In France, Cabernet Franc is found predominantly in the Loire Valley and in the Libournais region of Bordeaux. As of 2000, it was the sixth most widely planted red grape variety in the country. Other areas with significant plantings include the Bergerac and Madiran Appellation d'origine contrôlée (AOCs). By the early 20th century, there were nearly equal plantings of Cabernet Sauvignon and Cabernet Franc in Bordeaux with around 25,000 acres (10,000 ha) by the late 1960s. Most of these plantings were along the right bank of the Gironde in the Fronsac, St-Emilion and Pomerol regions. Towards the end of the 20th century, even though plantings of Cabernet Sauvignon had rapidly increased in Bordeaux to a 2 to 1 ratio in proportion to Cabernet Franc, plantings there were over 35,360 acres (14,310 ha) of the latter, nearly half of the country's total 88,900 acres (36,000 ha).

In the Loire Valley, Cabernet is widely planted in the Anjou, Bourgueil, Chinon, and Saumur-Champigny regions.

=== Italy ===
By 2000 there were over 17,300 acres (7,000 ha) of Cabernet Franc in Italy. However, the grape variety is commonly confused with both Cabernet Sauvignon and the ancient Bordeaux grape Carmenere, so the true acreage may not be known until more vineyards have been surveyed by ampelographers. It is mostly planted in the far northeast of Italy, particularly in Friuli, but it is also found in the vineyards of the Veneto (where it is known as Bordo), and is found as part of some Chianti blends, even as far south as Apulia. Plantings of Cabernet Franc in Tuscany have been increasing in recent years, particularly in the Bolgheri and Maremma region where the grape is prized for the balance and elegance that it brings to blends. Italian wines often labelled simply as "Cabernet" tend to be primarily Cabernet Franc or a blend of Cabernet Franc and Cabernet Sauvignon.

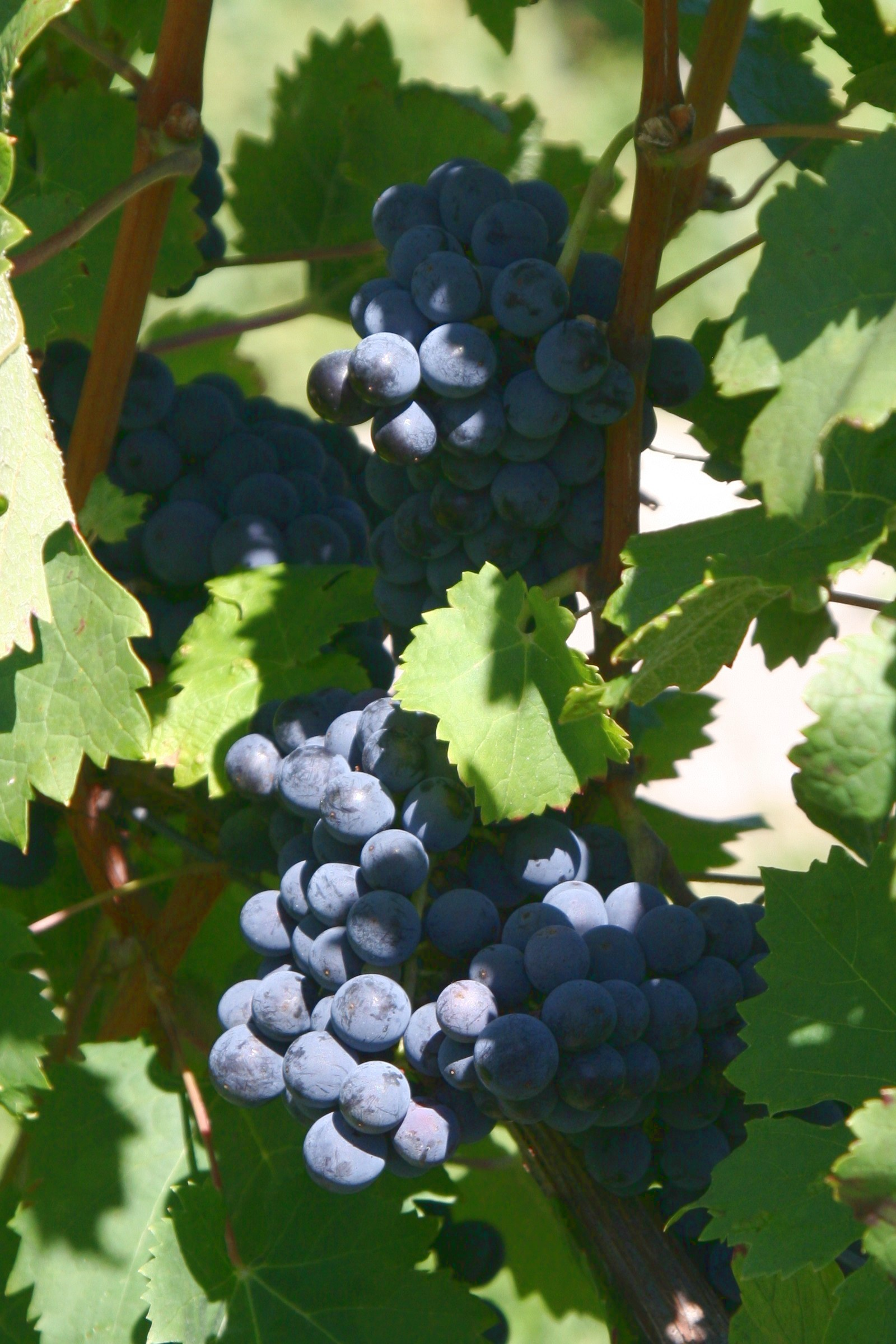
Cabernet Franc on the vine

=== Hungary ===
Cabernet Franc in Hungary had gained attention by the end of the 1990s when in some wine producing regions climate and growing conditions proved to be not optimal for Cabernet Sauvignon to reach its full ripeness. Successful varietal examples from Villány and Szekszárd show great potential, some international experts declared that Cabernet Franc "found its new home in Villány region". Hungarian varietal Cabernet Franc is a typically full-bodied, moderately or highly tannic wine with rich aromas of spices, blue flowers and red/black berry fruits with a reasonably good aging potential of about 10 years. These wines typically undergo 12 to 18 months of aging in new Hungarian oak barrels.

In addition to being found in Villány and Szekszárd, Cabernet Franc is also present in Eger, and in South Balaton and Sopron vineyards, to a lesser extent. Cabernet Franc often complements Bordeaux-style blends from these regions and occasionally plays a role in rosé production.

=== Other European regions ===
Outside France and Italy, sizable plantings of Cabernet Franc are found in Greece (where it is known as tsapournakos), Bulgaria, Slovenia, Croatia particularly in the Savudrija part of Istria, Croatia. This variety of grape is not very common in Spain, and is grown mainly in Catalonia, where it is an authorized variety in four DOPs: Catalunya (DO), Costers del Segre, Empordà, Pla de Bages, and Priorat. It is also grown Valencia and Castilla-La Mancha. In 2015, Spain grew 732 hectares (1,809 acres) of Cabernet Franc.

=== Canada ===
Cabernet Franc is becoming more popular in Canada, being planted in Ontario's Niagara Peninsula, Prince Edward County, the north shore of Lake Erie, Pelee Island, and the Okanagan Valley in British Columbia. While it is most often used in blends, it is gaining some popularity as a single varietal and as icewine. Ripening about two weeks earlier than Cabernet Sauvignon, it often fares better in Canada's cooler climate than other red wine grape varieties. Ontario Cabernet Francs often add a characteristic vegetal, raspberry like flavor to a wine with moderate acidity.

=== United States ===
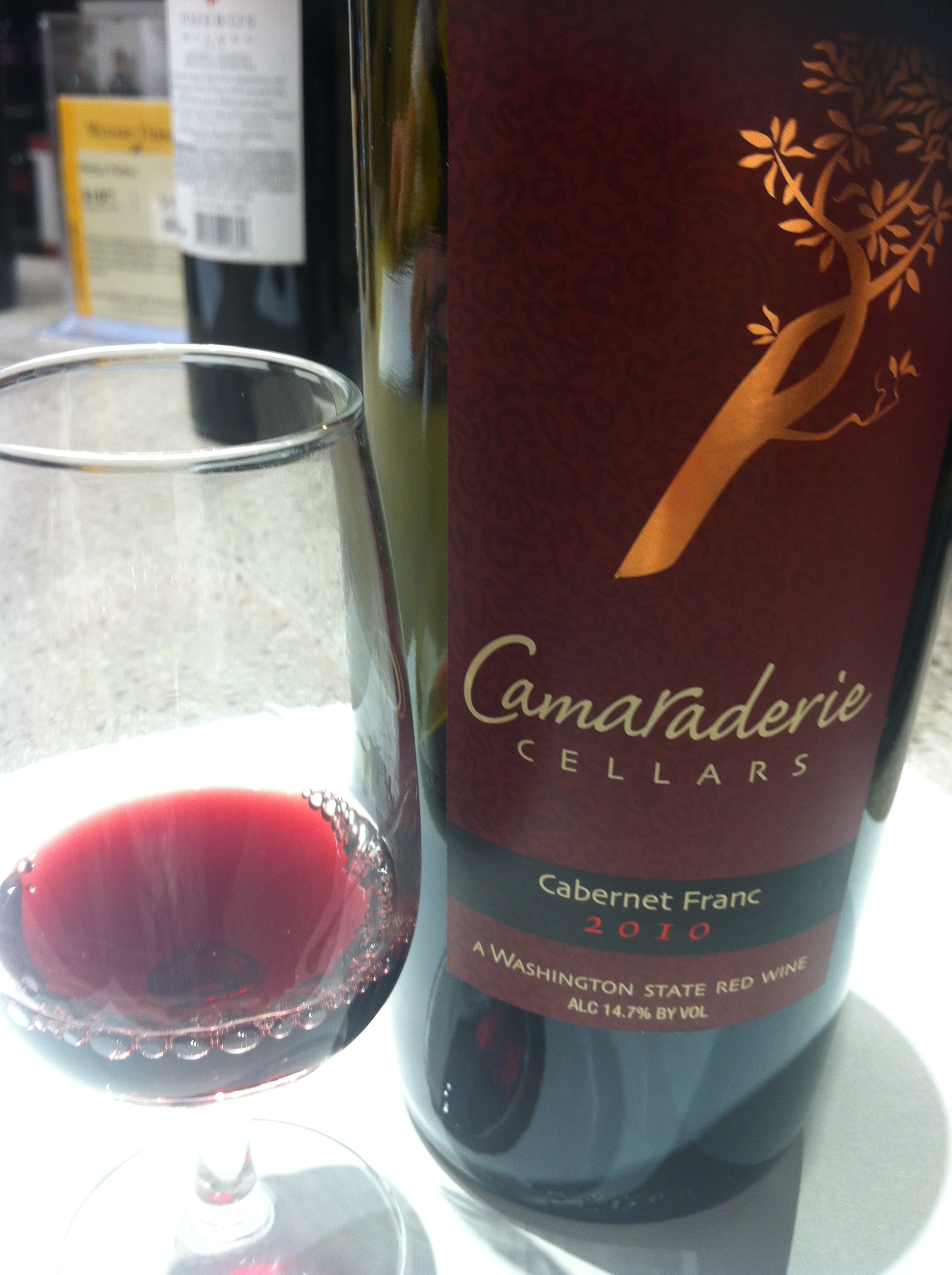
A Cabernet Franc from Washington

Interest in the grape started with California wine makers, who wanted to replicate the Bordeaux blend (now marketed as Meritage). In the early to mid 20th century, some plantings of Cabernet Franc were mistaken for Merlot. In the 1980s, heightened interest in Cabernet Franc led to an increase in plantings that helped push the total acreage of Cabernet Franc in California to 3,400 acres (1,400 ha), most of which is in Napa and Sonoma counties. In 1986, Casa Nuestra Winery in Napa Valley initiated the first Cabernet Franc program in the United States, winning a Double Gold and Best of Class Medal in the Los Angeles Times Wine Competition for their first vintage. The program continues today.

More recently the grape has caught the attention of growers in cooler areas such as Long Island and the Finger Lakes of New York, the Grand Valley AVA of Colorado, the Shawnee Hills AVA of southern Illinois, Pennsylvania, all sub-regions in Ohio, Michigan's west coast, Washington state and in the Monticello wine region in the Virginia Piedmont as well as the Roanoke metropolitan area, increasing planting in Missouri and Rocky Knob AVA areas of Southwestern Virginia. Michigan State University conducts research on Cabernet Franc at their agricultural research center in Benton Harbor, Michigan. In the Great Lakes Region and Virginia, Cabernet Franc is valued for its ability to ripen more reliably than other red Vitis vinifera and to produce wines of better quality than most hybrid grapes.

In Washington State, the first plantings of Cabernet Franc were cultivated in experimental blocks by Washington State University in the Columbia Valley during the 1970s. In 1985, Cabernet Franc was planted in the Red Willow Vineyard for use in Bordeaux style blends. The first varietal Cabernet Franc in Washington was released in 1991 by Columbia Winery followed by Chateau Ste Michelle in 1992 with grapes planted from their Cold Creek Vineyard. In the 1990s, Chinook Winery introduced the state's first Cabernet Franc rosé. Today it is the fourth most widely planted grape in the state behind Cabernet Sauvignon, Merlot, and Syrah. Washington Cabernet Franc is distinctive for its fruit forward style with blueberry and raspberry fruit. The characteristic vegetal notes are toned down in Washington, with the wines tending to show more notes of ground coffee and olives.

=== Argentina ===
Cabernet Franc plantings in Argentina have been producing top quality wines in recent years, and the varietal has been claimed as having the most potential in the country after Malbec. Squeeze Magazine has called it "the new, handsome superhero of Mendoza's wine scene". In 2014, the highest scoring Argentine wine in Robert Parker's Wine Advocate was a Cabernet Franc scored at 97 points. More recently, an argentine Cabernet Franc was distinguished in 2024 blind tasting of World of Fine Wine against celebrated old world wines. Cabernet Franc can be bottled alone, making lighter-bodied wines than the country's typical Malbecs (with wines scoring up to 95 points in Tim Atkin's report in 2016), or either as a majority or minority in blends.

=== Other New World regions ===
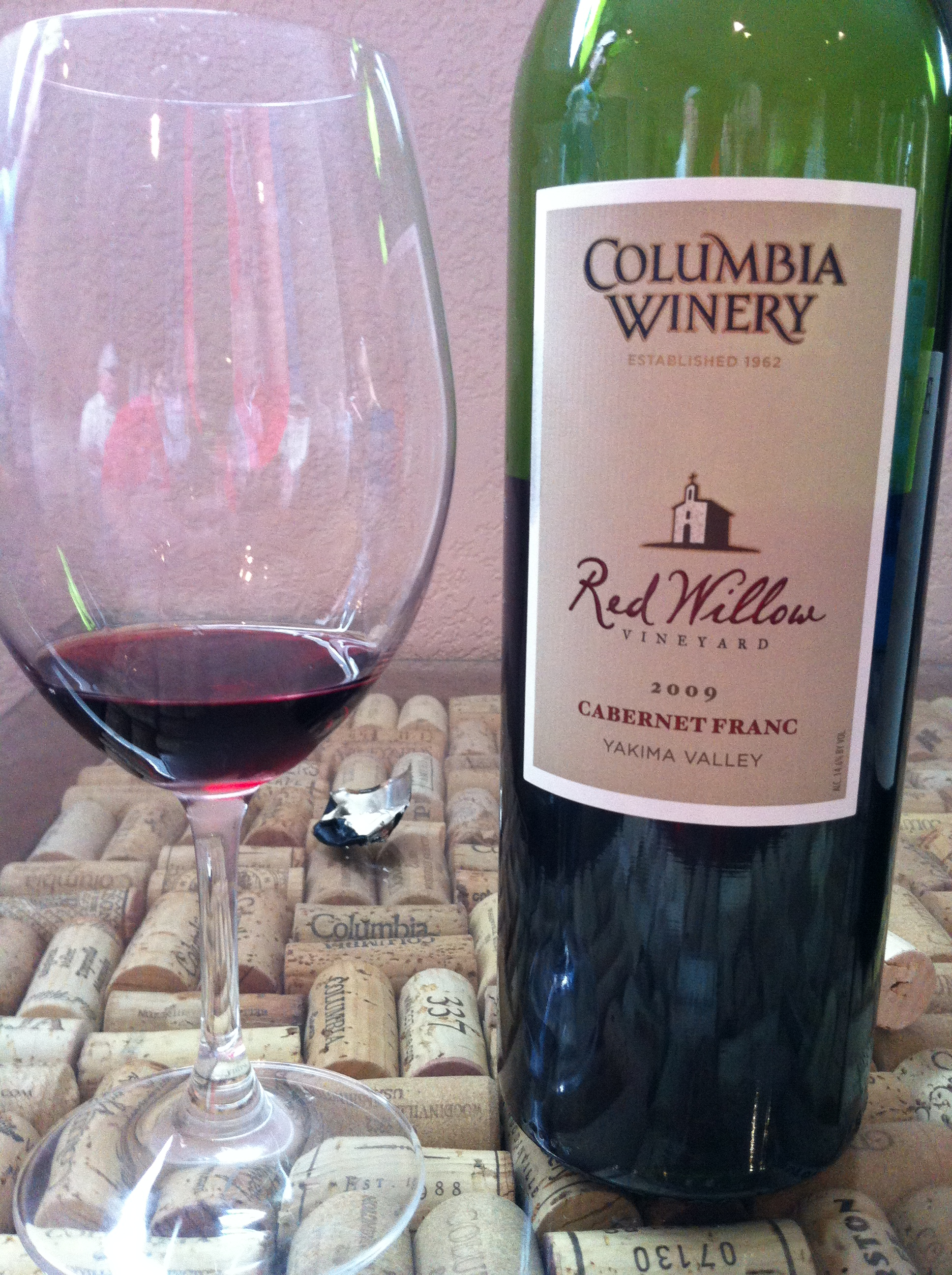
The first varietal Cabernet Franc in Washington State was produced by Columbia Winery from grapes grown at Red Willow Vineyard in the Yakima Valley.

In the New World, Cabernet is used predominantly as a blending component and is found in scant amounts in Australia, South Africa, Chile and New Zealand. As with so many grapes, Cabernet Franc came to Australia in James Busby's collection of 1832. It predominantly grows in cool, cool to warm and warm climates such as North-Eastern Victoria, McLaren Vale, the Adelaide Hills and the Clare Valley. In New Zealand, many winemakers have found that the cool climate of their terroir contributes to Cabernet Franc-like flavors in their Cabernet Sauvignon and plantings of true Cabernet Franc have remained limited with only around 519 acres (210 ha) planted as of 2006. In South Africa, Cabernet Franc has become a favorite of some of the country's boutique wineries and acreage has slowly been increasing to nearly 2,470 acres (1,000 ha) by the mid-2000s. In Chile there were around 2,910 acres (1,180 ha) planted by the early 21st century.

== Wines ==
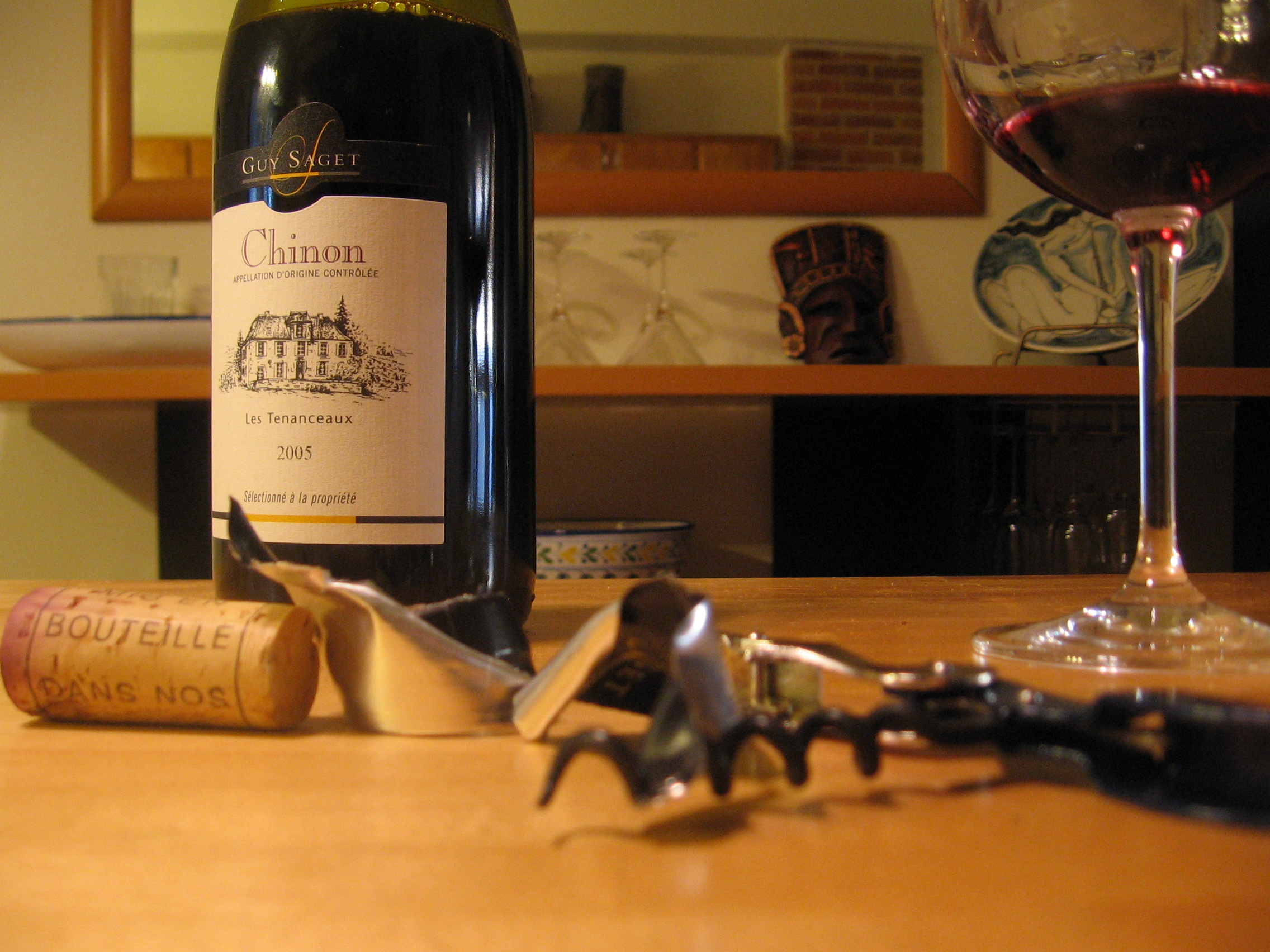
A Chinon wine from the Loire Valley made from Cabernet Franc

Cabernet Franc shares many of the same phenolic and aroma compounds as Cabernet Sauvignon but with some noticeable differences. Cabernet Franc tends to be more lightly pigmented and produces wines with the same level of intensity and richness. Cabernet Franc tends to have a more pronounced perfume with notes of raspberries, blackcurrants, violets and graphite. It is often characterized by a green, vegetal strike that can range from leaves to green bell peppers. It has slightly less tannins than Cabernet Sauvignon and tends to produce a wine with a smoother mouthfeel. New World examples of Cabernet Franc tend to emphasize the fruit more and may delay harvesting the grapes to try to minimize the green leafy notes.

== Synonyms ==
Genetically verified: Tsapournako (Greece), Verdejilla Tinto (Aragón in Spain).

Other synonyms: Achéria (Basque Country, mainly in Irouléguy), Ardounet (Béarn), Bidure (Graves), Bordeaux (Switzerland), Bordo (Romania), Boubet (Pyrénées-Atlantiques), Bouchet Franc or Gros Bouchet (Saint-Émilion and Pomerol), Bouchy (Madiran and Béarn), Breton (Val de Loire), Cabernet Gris, Cabrunet (Pomerol), Capbreton Rouge (Landes), Carmenet (Médoc), Couahort (Béarn), Plant Breton or Plant de l’Abbé Breton (Chinon in Indre-et-Loire), Sable Rouge (Tursan), Trouchet (Béarn), Véron (Nièvre and Deux-Sèvres), Vidure, Vuidure, Grosse Vidure (Graves), Aceria, Arrouya, Burdeas Tinto, Cabernet, Cabernet Aunis, Cabernet Franco, Fer Servandou, Gamput, Grosse Vidure, Hartling, Kaberne Fran, Messanges Rouge, Morenoa, Noir Dur, Petit Fer, Petit Viodure, Petite Vidure, Petite Vignedure, Véron Bouchy, Véronais.

Varieties commonly mistaken for Cabernet franc: Ardonnet (Béarn, no longer cultivated), Arrouya (Pyrénées), Béquignol noir (Dissay in the Vienne), Cabernet sauvignon, Carmenère, Gros Cabernet (Médoc, no longer cultivated), Hondarribi Beltza (País Vasco in Spain).
