= Alto Pass, Illinois =

- Village
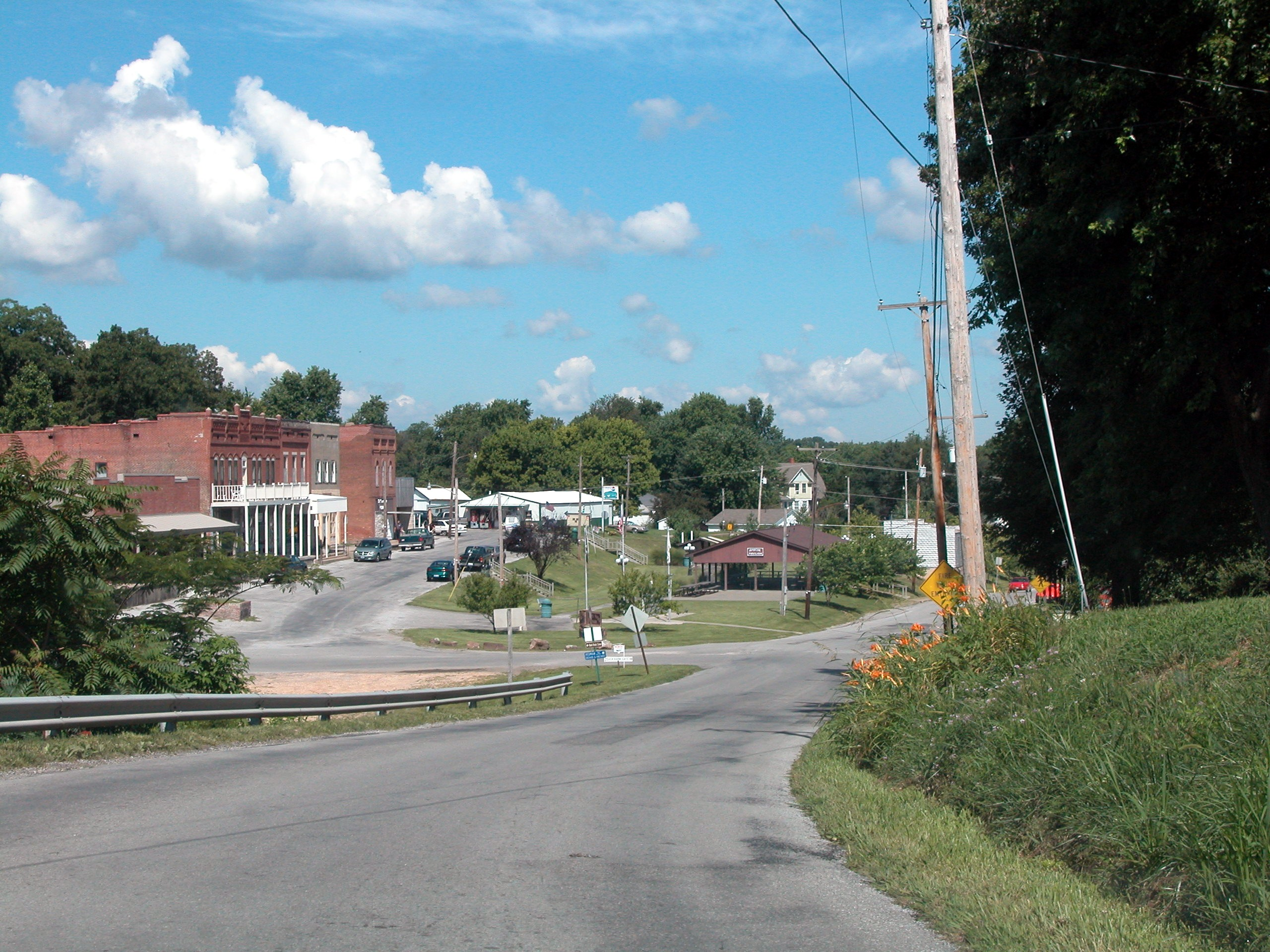
- Alto Pass in 2003

- Location of Alto Pass in Union County, Illinois

- Location of Illinois in the United States
- Coordinates: 37°34′11″N 89°19′8″W
- Country: United States
- State: Illinois
- County: Union

Government
  - Mayor: Scott Tripp

Area
  - Total: 2.16 sq mi (5.60 km^{2})
  - Land: 2.14 sq mi (5.53 km^{2})
  - Water: 0.031 sq mi (0.08 km^{2})
- Elevation: 742 ft (226 m)

Population (2020)
  - Total: 342
  - Estimate (2023): 314
- Time zone: UTC-6 (CST)
  - Summer (DST): UTC-5 (CDT)
- ZIP Code: 62905
- Area code: 618
- FIPS code: 17-01205
- GNIS feature ID: 2397948

Alto Pass is a village in Union County, Illinois, United States. The population was 342 at the 2020 census, a decrease from 391 in 2010. The Bald Knob Cross and Bald Knob Wilderness are nearby. Alto Pass lies northwest of Cobden, Illinois, and Illinois Route 127 runs just west of the village.

== History ==
Alto Pass was originally known as Quetil, or "Quail Gap". The community was platted on January 20, 1875, when the narrow-gauge Cairo and St. Louis Railroad was extended to that point.

The settlement developed as a railroad and agricultural shipping point. According to the Sundown Towns Database, Alto Pass was named because it was the highest elevation in Illinois traversed by a railroad, and by the turn of the 20th century the village had a post office, general stores, hotels, a blacksmith shop, a lumber yard, and other businesses serving the local fruit and vegetable trade.

The former railroad corridor through Alto Pass later became part of the route associated with the Gulf, Mobile and Ohio Railroad. The line between Percy and Cairo, including Alto Pass, was subsequently abandoned.

=== Bald Knob Cross ===
In 1937, Wayman Presley and the Reverend W. H. Lirely organized the first Easter sunrise service on nearby Bald Knob, drawing about 250 people. Attendance grew in later years, and between 1948 and 1951 a newly formed not-for-profit organization acquired land on the mountain for a permanent site.

Construction of the Bald Knob Cross proceeded in stages. A foundation was built by 1953, a formal groundbreaking ceremony was held during the 1959 Easter sunrise service, and the cross was completed in 1963 when white porcelain-veneer steel panels were installed on the framework. The monument is 111 feet tall and stands near the Shawnee National Forest.

=== Racial history ===
The Sundown Towns Database maintained by Tougaloo College lists Alto Pass as a community that was a sundown town in the past. The database records local accounts describing a practice of excluding Black people from remaining in the village after dark, including a reported folk interpretation of the town name as "all to pass".

The surrounding region has also been discussed in scholarship and journalism on sundown towns in southern Illinois. Nearby Anna and Jonesboro became associated with racial exclusion after the 1909 lynching of William James in Cairo and the subsequent expulsion of Black residents from the Anna-Jonesboro area.

== Geography ==
Alto Pass is located at 37°34′11″N 89°19′8″W (37.569758, -89.318873).

According to the 2020 census gazetteer files, Alto Pass has a total area of 2.16 square miles (5.59 km^{2}), of which 2.13 square miles (5.52 km^{2}) is land and 0.03 square miles (0.08 km^{2}) is water.

Bald Knob Cross is located approximately five miles southwest of the village.

== Demographics ==
Historical population
Census	Pop.	Note	%±
1880	166		—
1890	389		134.3%
1900	518		33.2%
1910	551		6.4%
1920	500		−9.3%
1930	485		−3.0%
1940	459		−5.4%
1950	462		0.7%
1960	323		−30.1%
1970	304		−5.9%
1980	369		21.4%
1990	417		13.0%
2000	388		−7.0%
2010	391		0.8%
2020	342		−12.5%
U.S. Decennial Census

=== 2000 census ===
As of the census of 2000, there were 388 people, 159 households, and 111 families residing in the village. The population density was 180.5 inhabitants per square mile (69.7/km^{2}). There were 168 housing units at an average density of 78.1 per square mile (30.2/km^{2}). The racial makeup of the village was 87.11% White, 0.77% Native American, 10.57% from other races, and 1.55% from two or more races. Hispanic or Latino of any race were 15.21% of the population.

There were 159 households, out of which 25.8% had children under the age of 18 living with them, 59.7% were married couples living together, 6.3% had a female householder with no husband present, and 29.6% were non-families. 27.7% of all households were made up of individuals, and 10.7% had someone living alone who was 65 years of age or older. The average household size was 2.44 and the average family size was 3.00.

In the village, the population was spread out, with 22.4% under the age of 18, 8.8% from 18 to 24, 27.3% from 25 to 44, 26.8% from 45 to 64, and 14.7% who were 65 years of age or older. The median age was 40 years. For every 100 females, there were 103.1 males. For every 100 females age 18 and over, there were 104.8 males.

The median income for a household in the village was $33,500, and the median income for a family was $36,406. Males had a median income of $25,583 versus $19,000 for females. The per capita income for the village was $17,288. About 12.0% of families and 15.3% of the population were below the poverty line, including 20.7% of those under age 18 and 6.7% of those age 65 or over.
