= Cobden, Illinois =

Cobden South Pass
- Village
- Village of Cobden, Illinois
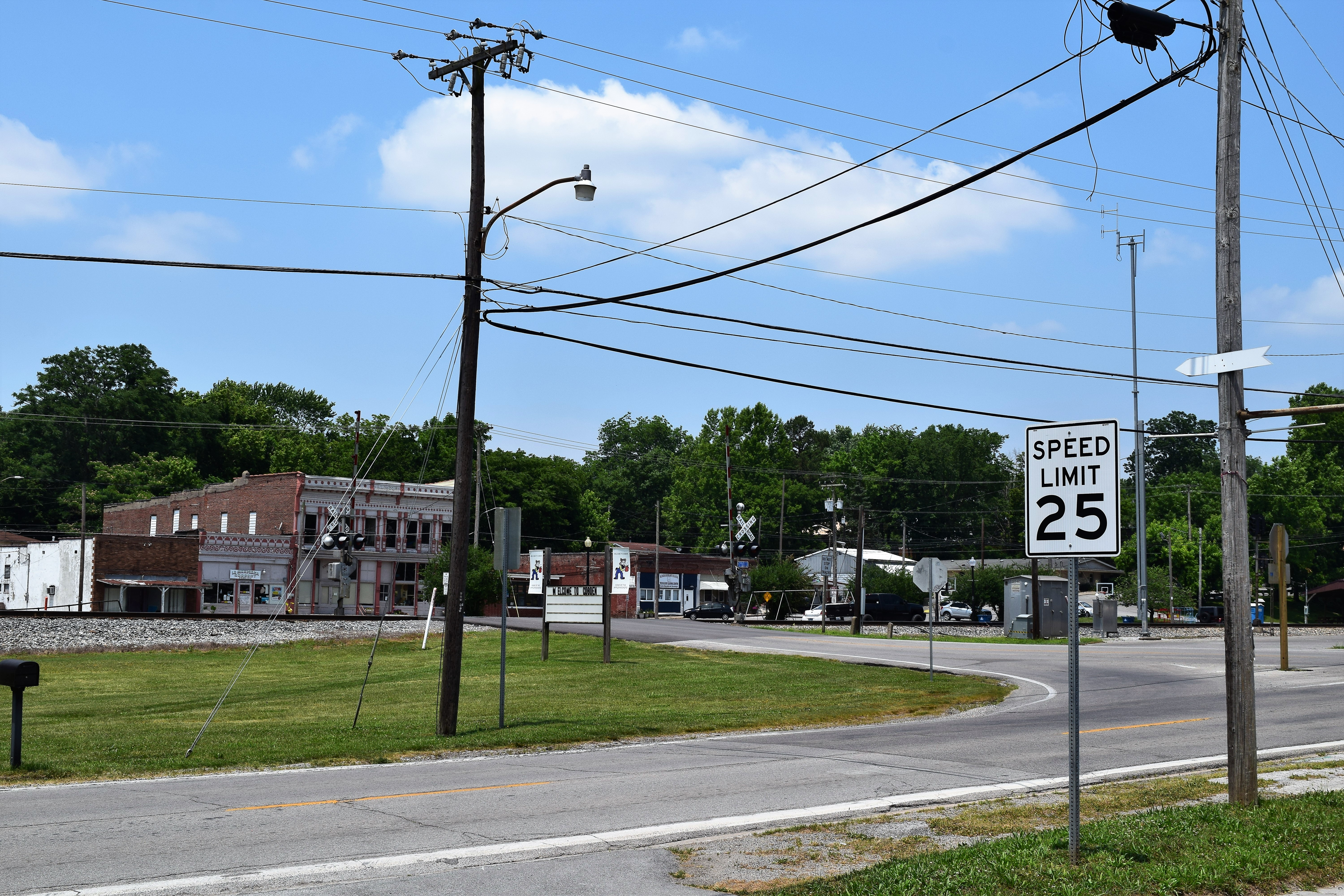
- Downtown Cobden

- Location of Cobden in Union County, Illinois.

- Location of Illinois in the United States
- Coordinates: 37°32′2″N 89°15′19″W
- Country: United States
- State: Illinois
- County: Union
- Named for: Richard Cobden

Government
  - Mayor: Paul "Zee" Tomazzoli

Area
  - Total: 1.23 sq mi (3.18 km^{2})
  - Land: 1.22 sq mi (3.16 km^{2})
  - Water: 0.0077 sq mi (0.02 km^{2})
- Elevation: 607 ft (185 m)

Population (2020)
  - Total: 1,018
  - Estimate (2023): 986
  - Density: 880.5/sq mi (339.97/km^{2})
- Time zone: UTC-6 (CST)
  - Summer (DST): UTC-5 (CDT)
- ZIP Code(s): 62920
- Area code: 618
- FIPS code: 17-15300
- GNIS feature ID: 2398593
- Wikimedia Commons: Cobden, Illinois
- Website: www.cobdenil.com

Cobden is a village in Union County, Illinois, United States, within the Southern Illinois region informally known as "Little Egypt.” The population estimate as of 2025 is 1,064. Cobden is regionally known for the mascot of its public school district, Cobden Unit School District #17. Known as the "Appleknockers,” a tribute to traveling farm laborers, Cobden's mascot has been regarded as one of the most unique high school mascots in the country by several publications and public voting contests. Cobden and surrounding areas is widely known for its many wineries and orchards, most notably Flamm Orchards, along Old U.S. Route 51, and Rendleman Orchard in nearby Alto Pass, Illinois.

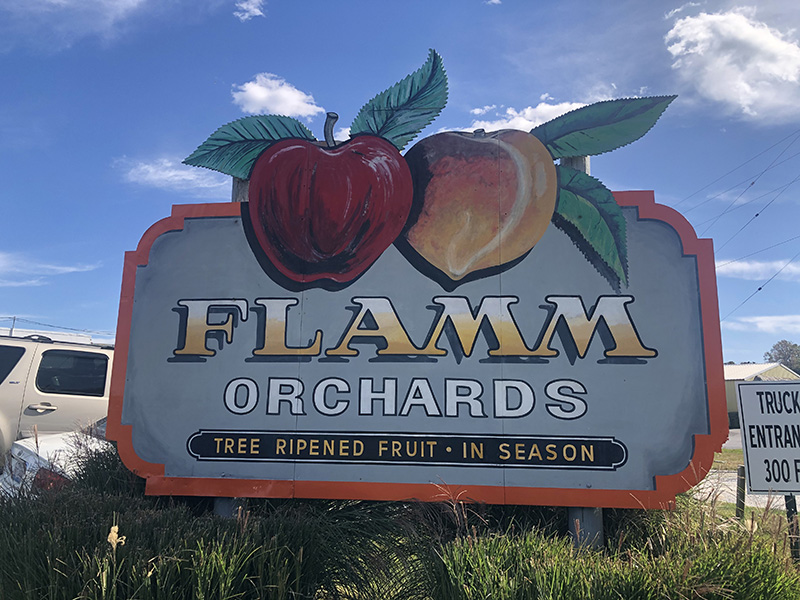
Image of Flamm Orchards

== History ==
The village is named after British politician Richard Cobden, who visited the town in 1859. An early variant name was "South Pass". Cobden began as an agricultural town and developed around the tracks of a route owned by the Illinois Central Railroad (now owned by Canadian National Railway), as well as being along a main highway, U.S. Highway 51, running through the region.

=== Mascot ===
Cobden's mascot is the "Appleknocker," a man with freckles wearing a straw hat and chewing on a piece of straw. This nickname originated when the high school first began to compete in athletics. It did not yet have a mascot, so other schools made up this derogatory term to insult the new school because of its large industry in peach and apple orchards. However, when Cobden High School played for the Illinois High School Boys Basketball Championship in 1964, this name was cemented in the town's history and became part of its cultural identity, even though it lost to Pekin High School 50–45.

== Geography ==
Cobden is located at 37°32′2″N 89°15′19″W (37.533949, -89.255409). Cobden lies 13.7 miles south of Carbondale, Illinois and just north of the towns of Anna, Illinois and Jonesboro, Illinois, along Old U.S. Highway 51, which runs straight through town. Nearby Alto Pass, Illinois lies 5.1 miles to the northwest.

According to the 2010 census, Cobden has a total area of 1.229 square miles (3.18 km^{2}), of which 1.22 square miles (3.16 km^{2}) (or 99.27%) is land and 0.009 square miles (0.02 km^{2}) (or 0.73%) is water.

Cobden is located near the crest of the Shawnee Hills. It is in "Cobden Col", a valley cut into rock by water near the summit of this ancient mountain range. Approximately 100,000 years ago, the Illinoian ice sheet covered almost all of Illinois. As it pushed south, the ice sheet climbed the Shawnee Mountains. The height of the ice sheet was much greater than that of the mountains. It stopped before it reached their summits. As it melted, a lake formed between the mountains and the glacier. Cobden Col was the outlet of this lake.

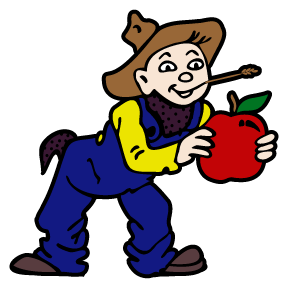
Cobden Appleknocker mascot

== Demographics ==
Historical population
Census	Pop.	Note	%±
1880	800		—
1890	994		24.3%
1900	1,034		4.0%
1910	988		−4.4%
1920	944		−4.5%
1930	1,036		9.7%
1940	1,098		6.0%
1950	1,104		0.5%
1960	918		−16.8%
1970	1,114		21.4%
1980	1,210		8.6%
1990	1,090		−9.9%
2000	1,116		2.4%
2010	1,157		3.7%
2020	1,074		−7.2%
U.S. Decennial Census

=== Racial and ethnic composition ===
Cobden village, Illinois – Racial and ethnic composition Note: the US Census treats Hispanic/Latino as an ethnic category. This table excludes Latinos from the racial categories and assigns them to a separate category. Hispanics/Latinos may be of any race.
Race / Ethnicity (NH = Non-Hispanic)	Pop 2000	Pop 2010	Pop 2020	% 2000	% 2010	% 2020
White alone (NH)	948	783	720	84.95%	67.68%	67.04%
Black or African American alone (NH)	16	12	18	1.43%	1.04%	1.68%
Native American or Alaska Native alone (NH)	5	1	5	0.45%	0.09%	0.47%
Asian alone (NH)	0	3	2	0.00%	0.26%	0.19%
Native Hawaiian or Pacific Islander alone (NH)	0	1	2	0.00%	0.09%	0.19%
Other race alone (NH)	0	0	2	0.00%	0.00%	0.19%
Mixed race or Multiracial (NH)	3	26	45	0.27%	2.25%	4.19%
Hispanic or Latino (any race)	144	331	280	12.90%	28.61%	26.07%
Total	1,116	1,157	1,074	100.00%	100.00%	100.00%

=== 2020 census ===
As of the 2020 census, Cobden had a population of 1,074. The median age was 44.5 years. 21.0% of residents were under the age of 18 and 23.5% of residents were 65 years of age or older. For every 100 females there were 104.6 males, and for every 100 females age 18 and over there were 105.3 males age 18 and over.

0.0% of residents lived in urban areas, while 100.0% lived in rural areas.

There were 394 households in Cobden, of which 35.5% had children under the age of 18 living in them. Of all households, 45.4% were married-couple households, 18.0% were households with a male householder and no spouse or partner present, and 28.9% were households with a female householder and no spouse or partner present. About 28.4% of all households were made up of individuals and 13.0% had someone living alone who was 65 years of age or older.

There were 445 housing units, of which 11.5% were vacant. The homeowner vacancy rate was 2.0% and the rental vacancy rate was 15.1%.

Racial composition as of the 2020 census
Race	Number	Percent
White	752	70.0%
Black or African American	19	1.8%
American Indian and Alaska Native	22	2.0%
Asian	2	0.2%
Native Hawaiian and Other Pacific Islander	2	0.2%
Some other race	70	6.5%
Two or more races	207	19.3%

=== 2000 census ===
As of the 2000 census, there were 1,116 people, 421 households, and 276 families residing in the village. The population density was 908.6 inhabitants per square mile (350.8/km^{2}). There were 457 housing units at an average density of 372.1 per square mile (143.7/km^{2}). The racial makeup of the village was 48.8% White, 1.43% African American, 0.63% Native American, 5.73% from other races, and 1.52% from two or more races. Hispanic or Latino of any race were 51.3% of the population.

There were 421 households, out of which 30.6% had children under the age of 18 living with them, 49.9% were married couples living together, 12.1% had a female householder with no husband present, and 34.4% were non-traditional families. 30.6% of all households were made up of individuals, and 14.5% had someone living alone who was 65 years of age or older. The average household size was 2.47 and the average family size was 3.16.

In the village, the population was spread out, with 25.2% under the age of 18, 8.0% from 18 to 24, 23.8% from 25 to 44, 25.1% from 45 to 64, and 17.9% who were 65 years of age or older. The median age was 40 years. For every 100 females, there were 83.9 males. For every 100 females age 18 and over, there were 83.1 males.

The median income for a household in the village was $26,364, and the median income for a family was $32,500. Males had a median income of $25,938 versus $19,423 for females. The per capita income for the village was $13,978. About 13.7% of families and 22.1% of the population were below the poverty line, including 21.5% of those under age 18 and 14.7% of those age 65 or over.

== Notable people ==
- Mary Tracy Earle (1864–1955), author
- Thomas Oscar Freeman (1947–1982), murderer and murder victim

== Sources ==
- "History of Cobden," History Committee of the Cobden Community Development Program, 1955
