= Illinois wine =

Wine made from grapes grown in Illinois, United States

Illinois
- Wine region
- Illinois AVAs
- Official name: State of Illinois
- Type: U.S. State Appellation
- Year established: 1818
- Years of wine industry: 146
- Country: United States
- Sub-regions: Shawnee Hills AVA, Upper Mississippi River Valley AVA
- Climate region: Continental/humid subtropical
- Total area: 35.5 million acres (55,519 sq mi)
- Size of planted vineyards: 1,100 acres (450 ha)
- Grapes produced: Cabernet Franc, Cabernet Sauvignon, Catawba, Cayuga, Chambourcin, Chancellor, Chardonel, Concord, De Chaunac, Edelweiss, Elvira, Frontenac, Gewürztraminer, Golden Muscat, La Crosse, Leon Millot, Marechal Foch, Merlot, Muscadine, Niagara, Norton, Riesling, Seyval blanc, St. Pepin, Traminette, Vidal blanc, Vignoles, Villard blanc, Villard noir
- No. of wineries: 79

Illinois wine refers to wine made from grapes grown in the U.S. state appellation of Illinois. State names in the United States automatically qualify as legal appellations of origin for wine produced from grapes grown in that state and do not require registration with the Alcohol and Tobacco Tax and Trade Bureau (TTB) of the Treasury Department. TTB was created in January 2003, when the Bureau of Alcohol, Tobacco and Firearms, or ATF, was extensively reorganized under the provisions of the Homeland Security Act of 2002.

In 2006, Shawnee Hills, in southern Illinois, was named the state's initial American Viticultural Area (AVA). In 2009, the Alcohol and Tobacco Tax and Trade Bureau (TTB), Treasury established the vast Upper Mississippi River Valley, to date the nation's largest AVA, encompassing 19.1 million acres (29,914 sq mi) along the Upper Mississippi River and its tributaries located in northwest Illinois, northeast Iowa, southeast Minnesota and southwest Wisconsin. As of 2025, there were 174 wineries in Illinois, cultivating approximately 529 acres (214 ha) of vines with more than 130 tasting rooms in the state of Illinois.

== History ==
Grapes have been growing in Illinois for over 150 years. One of the first areas to begin growing grapes was on the banks of the Mississippi in Nauvoo. The oldest recorded Concord vineyard in Illinois was planted in 1851, located in Nauvoo State Park, and still producing fruit. By 1880 there were over 600 acres (242.8 ha) of grapes and 40 wine cellars in the town of Nauvoo, presently known for its fine wines.
The oldest surviving family-owned vineyard in Illinois is also located in Nauvoo. Emile Baxter came to Nauvoo in 1855 to join an Icarian commune and remained after the breakup of the group. Learning about grape culture from his Icarian friends, Emile planted eight acres (3 ha) of vineyards. After Prohibition in 1936, the Baxter family winery became Illinois' first bonded winery.
In a sharply different region of Illinois, the Shawnee Hills, Guy Renzaglia founded Alto Vineyards in 1982. He planted new varieties such as Chancellor, Chambourcin, Vidal blanc, and Villard blanc. Renzaglia and two other growers founded the Shawnee Hills Wine Trail in the 1990s. Winemaking expanded rapidly in Illinois from about 1990 onward. The number of operating Illinois wineries increased in the state from 3 in 1985, to 12 in 1997, to 63 in 2004, and 79 in 2008. In 2016, Southern Illinois University Carbondale announced plans to create a degree-granting program in fermentation sciences, including winemaking.
As of 2025, 174 Illinois wineries, working with 529 acres (214 ha) of grape arbors, produced 651,800 US gallons (2,467,331 L) of wine annually with an annual total positive economic impact estimated at $11.72 billion.

== Varieties ==
In 2004, twelve grape varieties accounted for 89% of grape area harvested in Illinois. The favorite varieties, in descending order by area devoted to production, were Chardonel, Chambourcin, Vignoles, Traminette, Concord, Foch, Seyval, Norton, Vidal blanc, Frontenac, Niagara, and Cayuga White. Many of these varieties are "hybrid" varieties. These hybrids, which are adapted to the cold climates of central and northern Illinois, are grapes grown from vines that are hybridized descendants of both European vinifera grapes and native American grape varieties. The Illinois Grape Growers and Vintners Association informed wine critics for the Wall Street Journal in 2008 that hybrid wines were the state's "strong suit."

== American Viticultural Areas (AVAs) ==
=== Shawnee Hills AVA ===
One of the foremost grape-growing regions of Illinois is the Shawnee Hills, in Jackson County and Union County near Carbondale, Illinois in far southern Illinois. This region was designated the Shawnee Hills AVA in December 2006, becoming the first American Viticultural Area within Illinois. Besides the benefits of appellation recognition, this designation allows wineries to use the term “Estate Bottled” for wines produced on the same premises on which the grapes are grown. As of 2006, the Shawnee Hills AVA included 15 wineries and 55 vineyards. Jackson and Union Counties were the two foremost wine-producing counties in Illinois.

Characteristics that contributed to this decision are the lack of glaciation, as well as the bordering rivers. The heightened elevation (400 ft above neighboring land) in concert with sandstone and limestone subsoil offers satisfactory drainage, and summer breezes reduce fungal infestation. The climate of the Shawnee Hills AVA, within the Illinois Ozarks region, resembles several areas in Missouri known for their wine (see Missouri wine). The climate also resembles certain regions in Spain and Italy.

=== Upper Mississippi Valley AVA ===
Upper Mississippi Valley AVA, which primarily covers Driftless Area regions in Minnesota, Iowa and Wisconsin, also covers the Galena region of Illinois.

== Wine trails ==
As of 2025, the Illinois Grape Growers and Vintners Alliance (IGGVA) promotes five wine trails; Carlyle Lake, Heart of Illinois, Mississippi Valley, Shawnee Hills, and Wabash Valley Wine Trails. Part of Illinois Route 127 south of Carbondale, which passes through the Shawnee Hills AVA, was designated by the Illinois General Assembly as the Shawnee Hills Wine Trail.

The Northern Illinois Wine Trail passes through the Galena subdistrict of the Upper Mississippi Valley AVA.

The Illinois River Wine Trail centers on wineries in the upper drainage of the Illinois River, and the Heartland Rivers Wine Trail centers on wineries in and around the mouth of the same river.

== Categories ==
The Illinois State Fair, operated by the Illinois Department of Agriculture, recognizes ten distinct categories of Illinois wine:

- Dessert wine
- Fruit wine
- Generic blended wine
- Hybrid red
- Hybrid white
- Native American red
- Native American white
- Sparkling wine
- Vinifera red
- Vinifera white

In addition to grape-based wine, several wineries in the Illinois Ozarks ( part of the Ozarks ) and other regions of Illinois make fruit wine from apples, peaches, and berries. Fruit wine is an officially recognized category within the Illinois wine industry.

== Promotion ==
In addition to the Illinois State Fair, the Illinois wine industry has developed independent promotional pathways. The first Chicago & Midwest Wine Show was scheduled to be held in Chicago in September 2008.

== See also ==
- American wine
- List of wineries in Illinois
