= Texoma AVA =

American Viticultural Area located in north Texas

Coordinates: 33°45′40″N 96°25′03″W

Texoma
- Wine region
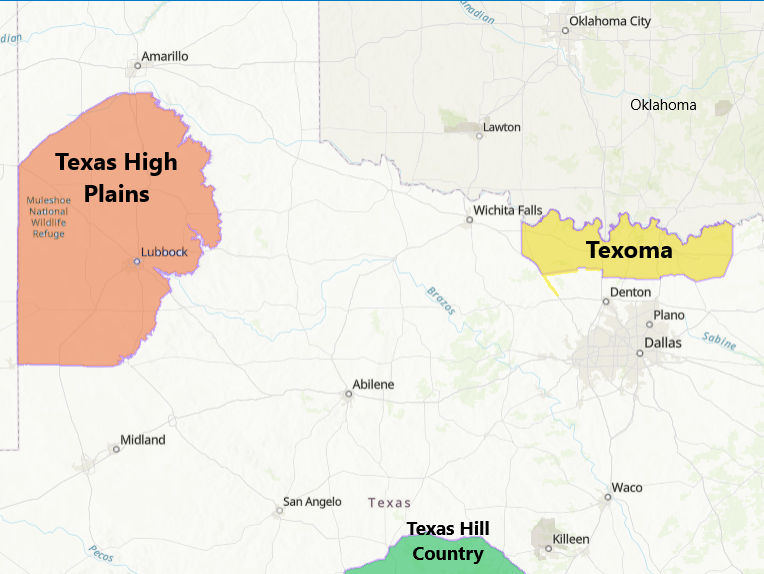
- Northern Texas AVAs
- Type: American Viticultural Area
- Year established: 2005
- Country: United States
- Part of: Texas
- Other regions in Texas: Bell Mountain AVA, Escondido Valley AVA, Fredericksburg in the Texas Hill Country AVA, Mesilla Valley AVA, Texas Davis Mountains AVA, Texas High Plains AVA, Texas Hill Country AVA
- Growing season: 225 to 230 days
- Climate region: Humid subtropical
- Precipitation (annual average): 30 to 40 in (760–1,020 mm)
- Soil conditions: Loamy and sandy or loamy and clayey with good drainage
- Total area: 2.3 million acres (3,650 sq mi)
- Size of planted vineyards: 55 acres (22 ha)
- No. of vineyards: 6
- Grapes produced: Albariño, Cabernet Sauvignon, Chardonnay, Graciano, Grenache, Merlot, Mourvèdre, Petit Verdot, Picpoul Blanc, Pinot Noir, Roussanne, Syrah, Tempranillo, Viognier
- No. of wineries: 9

Texoma is an American Viticultural Area (AVA) located in north-central Texas, on the south side of the large reservoir Lake Texoma and the Red River along the boundary of the Texas-Oklahoma state line. The 2.3-million-acre (3,650 sq mi) viticultural area expands across portions of Montague, Cooke, Grayson, and Fannin Counties. It was established as the nation's 169^{th} and the state's eighth appellation on December 7, 2005 by the Alcohol and Tobacco Tax and Trade Bureau (TTB), Treasury after reviewing the petition submitted by the Texoma Appellation Committee, of Denison, Texas, on behalf of regional vintners, proposing the viticultural area in north-central Texas to be known as "Texoma."
Its name mimics the interstate border region, Texoma, a portmanteau of Texas and Oklahoma. The AVA's northern boundary is defined by the Red River which flows west–east en route from the Texas Panhandle, where it rises just west of the Texas High Plains, as a tributary to the Atchafalaya River, a distributary of the Mississippi. At the outset, four wineries were located in Texoma AVA. In 2006, the number increased to six. As of 2025, there are nine resident wineries and six vineyards.

== History ==
Some of the earliest recorded Texas wines were produced by Spanish missionaries in the 1650s near El Paso. These early winemakers planted grapevines brought over from Spain and used them to produce sacramental wines for use in religious ceremonies. As the Spanish colonized Texas, they continued to cultivate grapes and produce wine, with some vineyards being established as far east as modern-day Houston.

In the mid-1800s, German and French settlers began to arrive in Texas and brought with them their own winemaking traditions. These settlers established vineyards in the Hill Country and other regions of the state, and their influence can still be seen in the varietals grown and produced today. Texoma region's winemaking roots go deep, starting with early settlers who brought grapevines from Europe. These pioneers found the soil and climate ideal for growing grapes. Local varieties began to flourish, and small-scale wineries started to pop up. Grape cultivation was initially for personal use. Over time, as more settlers arrived, commercial vineyards began to develop. By the late 19th century, several small vineyards dotted the landscape, setting the foundation for a budding wine industry.
The Texoma region is where renowned 19th century American horticulturist and viticulturist Thomas Volney "T.V." Munson chose the area as the site for his experimental vineyards. An expert on native grape varieties, he was particularly excited by the varieties of native grapes found within the region, calling the area his "grape paradise." He developed over 300 new grape varieties from the wild grapes growing along the bluffs of the Red River and its tributaries. Munson made extensive use of American native grape species, and devoted a great deal of his life to collecting and documenting them. He released hundreds of named cultivars, but his work identifying American native grape, specifically Texan varietals, is of great significance today for their use in rootstock. Though breeding for wine quality seems to have occupied a great proportion of his effort, his work on rootstock development, grafting Vitis vinifera grapevines onto native American varieties, had the greatest impact on viticulture. This work provided French grape growers with phylloxera-resistant rootstocks, allowing them to recover from the devastating 1870 epidemic and continue to grow the ancient Vitis vinifera cultivars. These rootstocks are still used worldwide. In honor of his work, the French government named him Chevalier du Merite Agricole, and Cognac, France, became a sister city to Munson's home of Denison. Currently, the T.V. Munson Memorial Vineyard at Grayson County College in Denison, Texas, carries on Munson's legacy. The vineyard grows 65 of the 300 grape varieties developed by Munson, and the college, unlike most junior colleges in the nation, bestows an associate degree in viticulture and enology. Because of the importance of native grape species to the viticultural history and identity of the Texoma region, the petitioner bases the southern boundary in part on the distribution of wild grapevines through the area. The Texoma viticultural area southern boundary excludes some southern portions of the four counties since wild grapevines generally do not grow on the south-facing slopes beyond the ridge that divides the Red River and Trinity River drainage basins.

== Terroir ==
=== Topography ===
Much of the terrain in the Texoma region slopes downward and northward toward the Red River. The elevation ranges from a low of 597 feet (182 m) above sea level in northeast Fannin County to a high of 1,271 feet (387 m) on ridges in southeast Montague County. Evening breezes off the Texoma bluffs and rolling hillsides temper the intense heat of the day, and cool the vineyards. Numerous small creeks flow northward to Lake Texoma and the Red River throughout the Texoma area. Several varieties of wild grapes grow freely in these creek beds, just as they did in the days of T.V. Munson. The north-facing slopes (3 percent to 12 percent incline) in the Texoma viticultural area diminish the power of the summer sun and thus provide excellent conditions for vineyards. Recent research indicates that 15-degree north-facing slopes can reduce the sunlight index in June from 107 to 86. (The sunlight index is a scale measuring the amount of solar radiation received by plants.) This results in significantly less heat stress on the vines. In September, the effect is even greater, with the sunlight index reduced from 122 to 70. The petitioners contrast this with land south of Texoma in the Dallas-Fort Worth area. There the land slopes south, resulting in a much higher sunlight index and greater heat stress on grape vines. In addition to Lake Texoma, the Texoma area has numerous lakes and ponds. These bodies of water provide a large reserve for irrigating the area's vineyards. The petitioners also believe that sunlight reflecting off these bodies of water helps to ripen grapes. They note that a similar effect occurs in New York's Finger Lakes region and in Germany's Moselle and Rhine River valleys. Gentle breezes off Lake Texoma provide advection warming to the surrounding hillsides during cool autumn nights.

=== Climate ===
According to the petitioners, Texoma's climate is favorable for grape growing, while the climate of surrounding areas is not. Texoma's temperatures for November through February generally are 5.3 to 6.7 °F (−14.8 to −14.1 °C) cooler than those in areas to the south and southeast, such as the Dallas-Fort Worth area, which averages 33.6 °F (0.9 °C), and Greenville, Texas, which averages 34.9 °F (1.6 °C). Texoma's winter temperatures in the mid- and upper-20s are cold enough to kill the insect that causes Pierce's disease, while causing no damage to vineyards. The petitioners state that vineyards in the Dallas-Fort Worth area have, in contrast, suffered extensive damage from Pierce's disease. Areas north and west of Texoma, such as Oklahoma and northwestern Texas, have winter temperatures that are 5.34 to 6 °F (−14.8 to −14.4 °C) colder than Texoma's. These temperatures increase the risk of damage to vines. Freeze and thaw cycles in these areas can split vine trunks, while the milder winter temperatures of Texoma prevent such damage. The petitioners assert that Texoma's precipitation is also favorable for grape growing. While its vineyards rely to some extent on irrigation, Texoma receives an annual rainfall of 30 to 40 in (760–1,020 mm), which is close to sufficient. As one heads west from Texoma, the climate is increasingly drier. Wichita Falls, Texas, for example, receives only 28 in (710 mm) of rain a year, an amount that cannot sustain vineyards. Few sources of water for irrigation, such as Lake Texoma, exist west of Texoma. Areas east of Texoma receive much heavier rainfall, as much as 51 in (1,300 mm) annually in Texarkana. Such heavy rainfall often results in standing water, which can cause root rot and kill vines. The USDA plant hardiness zones are 7b, 8a and 8b.

=== Soil ===
Texoma soils differ from the soils in surrounding areas. Texoma contains sandy, loamy soils that provide good drainage for vineyards. Surrounding areas contain black-land soils, which do not provide good drainage for vineyards. The petitioners note that some areas south and southwest of the viticultural area also have sandy, loamy soils, but that these soils lie outside the boundaries of the Texoma area. The petitioners state that, unlike the soils of surrounding areas, Texoma's soils, because of their sandiness, contain practically no phylloxera. The petitioners submitted a detailed soil report on the Texoma area prepared by a committee of soil scientists: Maurice Jurena and Jerry Rives of the U.S. Department of Agriculture's Natural Resources Conservation Service, Dr. George McEachern of Texas A&M University, and Dr. Charles E. Pehl, a private consultant. The report lists 36 soil series suitable for viticulture in the proposed area. Maps show these soil series throughout the Texoma area. According to the authors, these soils have the characteristics needed for productive vineyards—good internal drainage, adequate soil depth, and good water-holding capacity. Based on available soil surveys of the area, the authors state that approximately one-third of the area, an estimated 690,000 acres (1,080 sq mi), should be suitable for productive viticulture. The report describes three soils of particular interest: The Hicota series consists of fine sandy loams that are deep, moderately well drained, slowly permeable, and have good water holding capacity. These soils are found on the high terraces mainly along the Red River. Formed in loamy alluvium, their slopes range from 0 to 3 percent. The Freestone series consists of fine sandy loams that are very deep, moderately well drained, slowly permeable, and have good water holding capacity. These soils are found on Pleistocene terraces of remnant terraces on upland positions. Formed in loamy and clayey sediments, their slopes vary from 0 to 5 percent. The soils have aquic soil moisture conditions due to an extremely thin area of episaturation above the clay layer in the spring at a depth of 20 to 40 in (510–1,020 mm) during most years. The Frioton series consists of silty clay loams that are very deep, well drained, moderately slowly permeable, with good water holding capacity. Formed in loamy and clayey Pleistocene sediments on nearly level flood plains, their slopes range from 0 to 1 percent. They may be flooded for very brief periods during the months of February to July. As additional soil evidence, the petitioners submitted soil survey maps published by the Natural Resources Conservation Service, U.S. Department of Agriculture, for each of the four counties in the area. These maps consistently describe the various soils of Texoma, including those detailed in the petitioner's soil report, as either "loamy and sandy" or "loamy and clayey." In addition, the area's sandy, loamy soils are a natural deterrent to the phylloxera louse.

== See also ==
- Texas wine
