= Texas wine =

Wine made from grapes grown in Texas, United States

Texas
- Wine region
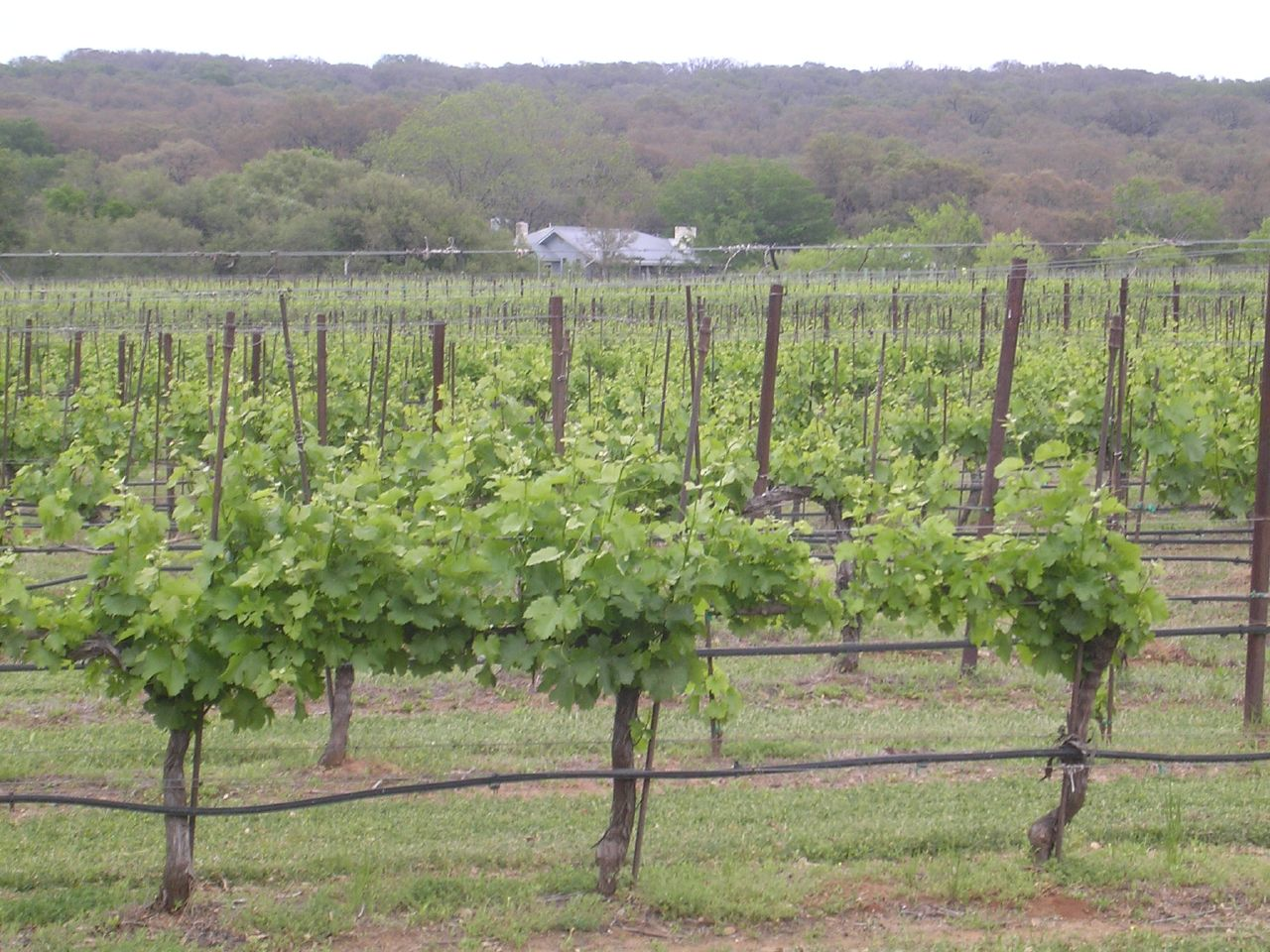
- A vineyard in the Texas Hill Country AVA near Johnson City
- Official name: State of Texas
- Type: U.S. State Appellation
- Year established: 1845
- Years of wine industry: 376
- Country: United States
- Other regions in vicinity: New Mexico, Oklahoma
- Sub-regions: Bell Mountain AVA, Escondido Valley AVA, Fredericksburg in the Texas Hill Country AVA, Mesilla Valley AVA, Texas Davis Mountains AVA, Texas High Plains AVA, Texas Hill Country AVA, Texoma AVA
- Climate region: Humid subtropical, also continental in Northern Panhandle and some SW highlands
- Total area: 167.2 million acres (261,232 sq mi)
- Size of planted vineyards: 9,300+ acres (3,764+ ha)
- Grapes produced: Aglianico, Albarino, Alicante Bouschet, Barbera, Black Spanish, Blanc du Bois, Cabernet Franc, Cabernet Sauvignon, Chambourcin, Champanel, Chardonnay, Chenin Blanc, Cinsault, Concord, Dolcetto, Gewürztraminer, Graciano, Grenache, Lomanto, Malbec, Malvasia Bianca, Marsanne, Merlot, Montepulciano, Mourvèdre, Muscadine, Muscat Canelli, Mustang, Negroamaro, Norton / Cynthiana, Petit Verdot, Petite Sirah, Pinot Grigio, Pinot Noir, Primitivo / Zinfandel, Riesling, Roussanne, Ruby Cabernet, Sagrantino, Sangiovese, Sauvignon Blanc, Semillon, Syrah / Shiraz, Tannat, Tempranillo, Touriga Nacional, Trebbiano, Vermentino, Favorita, Viognier
- No. of wineries: Over 400
- Comments: All data as of 2019

Texas wine refers to wine made from grapes grown in the U.S. state appellation of Texas. State names in the United States automatically qualify as legal appellations of origin for wine produced from grapes grown in that state and do not require registration with the Alcohol and Tobacco Tax and Trade Bureau (TTB) of the Treasury Department. TTB was created in January 2003, when the Bureau of Alcohol, Tobacco and Firearms, or ATF, was extensively reorganized under the provisions of the Homeland Security Act of 2002.

Texas has a long history of wine production. The sunny and dry climate of its major winemaking regions have drawn comparison to Portuguese wines, in addition to other regions in Europe like Spain, France, and Italy. Some of the earliest recorded Texas wines were produced by Spanish missionaries in the 1650s near El Paso.

The state is home to over 42 members of the Vitis grape vine family with fifteen being native to the state, more than any other region on earth. As of 2024, the state had over 9,300 acres (3,800 ha) planted with Vitis vinifera which ranks as the fifth largest wine producing state in the nation. Despite being the largest of conterminous states, this relatively small amount of planted land is dwarfed by the production of even the smallest French AOCs like Sancerre. The Texan wine industry is continuing its steady pace of expansion and has gained a reputation as an established wine growing region in the United States.

== History ==
Wine has been made in Texas for centuries and one of the oldest wine growing U.S. states with planted vines more than a hundred years before California or Virginia. No alcoholic beverage made from grapes appears to have been produced before the arrival of Europeans in the sixteenth century. Instead, the indigenous peoples of Meso-America made such alcoholic drinks as pulque, the forerunner of mescal, from the maguey or agave plant; tesgüino from the sprouted kernels of maize; and balché from mead, flavored from the leaves of the Lonchocarpus, a tropical tree or climbing shrub with colorful flowers. In the 1650s, Franciscan friar Garcia de San Francisco y Zǘñiga, the founder of El Paso, planted Mission vines in West Texas for the production of sacramental wine. The horticulturist Thomas Munson used Texas vines to create hundreds of hybrid grapes and conducted significant research in finding root stock immune to the Phylloxera epidemic, which saved the French wine industry from total ruin. The advent of Prohibition in the United States virtually eliminated Texas' wine industry, which didn't experience a revival until the 1970s, beginning with the founding of Llano Estacado and Pheasant Ridge wineries in the Texas High Plains appellation near Lubbock and the La Buena Vida winery in Springtown. The Texas wine industry still feels the effects of Prohibition today with a quarter of Texas' 254 counties still having dry laws on the books.

== Geography and climate ==
Texas is divided into three main wine growing regions with a vast range of diversity and microclimates that allows many different types of grapevines to grow in the state. The North-Central Region spans the northern third of the state from the border of New Mexico across the Texas Panhandle and towards Dallas. This includes the Texas High Plains AVA which has the highest concentration of grape growers in the state. The eastern third of the state makes up the South-Eastern Region which encompasses the area southeast of Austin & San Antonio, and including Houston. In recent years this area's wine industry has been hard hit by Pierce's Disease. The high humidity around the northern end of this area makes it difficult to grow vinifera grapes, while vines in the Muscadine family flourish along with Blanc du Bois and Black Spanish grapes which can withstand Pierce's Disease. Roughly in the center is the Texas Hill Country AVA where vinifera is grown. At the far southwest end of this region, along the Mexico–United States border is the state's oldest winery, Val Verde, which has been in operation for over a century. The central-western third of the state is known as the Trans-Pecos Region which produces about 40 percent of the state's grape in the highest altitude vineyards of the area. More than two thirds of all the wine produced in Texas comes from this area.

The calcareous soil in the Texas High Plains is characterized as red sandy loam (tiera roja) over caliche (limestone) with moderate low fertility, a terroir similar to that found in Coonawarra in Australia. The vines are exposed to long days of sunshine and cool nights due to an elevation of over 3500 feet. Cold temperatures during the winter gives the vines opportunity to shut down and go dormant before the growing season. The Ogallala Aquifer provides water resources for irrigation and serves as a tempering effects on the high summer temperatures and extreme winter hazards such as freezing temperatures and hail. The effects of constant wind over the flat terrain serves as a buffer against viticultural diseases such as oidium and powdery mildew.

Harvest time in Texas normally starts in July, two months earlier than in California and three months earlier than most of the wine regions in France.

== Appellations ==
Texas is home to eight American Viticultural Areas.

- Mesilla Valley AVA (1985) - West Texas. Texas' first AVA though primarily located in New Mexico with only small parts extending into Texas.
- Bell Mountain AVA (1986) - Central Texas. First AVA completely within the state of Texas. Known for its distinctive Cabernet Sauvignon grown in northern Gillespie County.
- Fredericksburg in the Texas Hill Country AVA (1989) - Central Texas. Known for its Cabernet Sauvignon and Chardonnay.
- Texas Hill Country AVA (1991) - Central Texas. Located just west of Austin. With over 9,000,000 acres (14,000 sq mi), it is the second-largest AVA in the United States though less than 800 acres (320 ha) are planted in grape vines.
- Escondido Valley AVA (1992) - West Texas. About 32,000 acres (13,000 ha) along the Pecos River in Pecos County.
- Texas High Plains AVA (1993) - North Texas. About 85% of the wine grapes in Texas are grown on the Texas High Plains in approximately 4,000 acres (1,600 ha). The AVA is the second largest AVA with over 8,000,000 acres (12,000 sq mi). Elevation ranges from 3,300 to 3,700 feet.
- Texas Davis Mountains AVA (1998) - West Texas. Only one winery in existence when granted AVA status in 1998. Specializes in Cabernet Sauvignon and Sauvignon blanc.
- Texoma AVA (2005) - North-central Texas. The Texoma region is where renown 19th century viticulturist Thomas Volney Munson established vineyards to discover grafting Vitis vinifera grapevines onto native American vine rootstock producing resistant vines saving premium French grape varietals decimated by the 1870 Phylloxera epidemic.

== Wines ==
Cabernet Sauvignon and Tempranillo have the highest number of plantings in the state, followed by Merlot, Black Spanish, and Blanc du Bois as leading variety in bearing acreage planted. Texas is also home to Mourvèdre, Sangiovese, Viognier, Muscat Canelli, and Malbec plantings. The United States Department of Agriculture - National Agricultural Statistics Service survey lists more than 53 wine varieties grown in Texas.

Over the past decade, the Southeast, Gulf Coast, and North Texas growing areas of Texas have increased their plantings of Blanc du Bois and Black Spanish varieties, which are more tolerant of the more humid climates in those areas. The two grapes are among the top ten grapes grown in Texas.

== Wineries ==
The oldest winery Val Verde Winery was founded in 1883. It remains the oldest continuously operating bonded winery in Texas. As of 2021, there are more than 470 wineries in Texas. Over 2,000,000 gallons of wine were produced in 2021 making it the fourth-largest wine producing state in the nation. That puts Texas behind California, Washington, and Oregon respectively. Mesa Vineyards was the largest wine producer in the state with 500 acres (200 ha) planted near Fort Stockton in West Texas. First established as an experimental vineyard in 1987 with the University of Texas System, the winery produced wine under multiple labels with the primary brand of Ste. Genevieve. The second largest winery is Llano Estacado Winery. Most of the wineries offer tastings. Besides standard wine tastings where a flight of wines are tasted, many wineries are offering special tasting experiences that include food and wine pairings, and more.

Wine Enthusiast magazine named the Texas Hill Country as one of the 10 best wine travel destinations in 2014.

== See also ==
- American wine
- Index of Texas-related articles
