= Texas High Plains AVA =

American Viticultural Area located in northwest Texas

Coordinates: 33°29′28″N 101°46′59″W

Texas High Plains
- Wine region
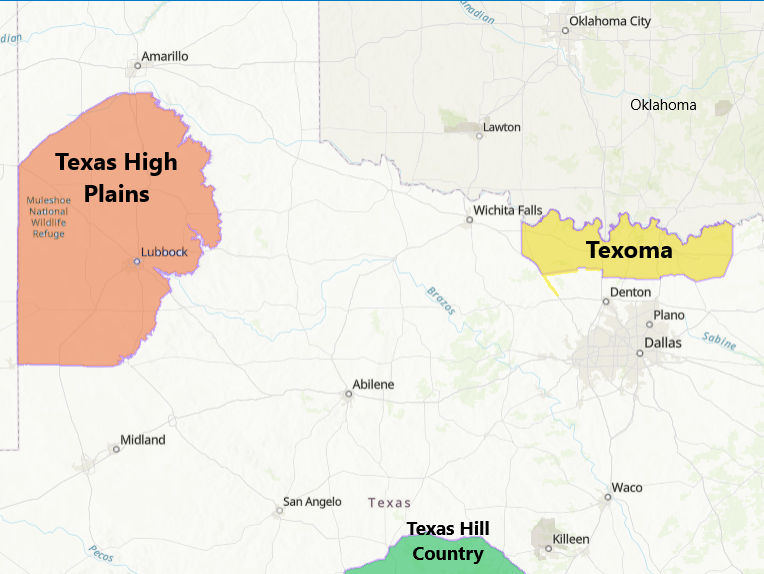
- Type: American Viticultural Area
- Year established: 1993
- Years of wine industry: 81
- Country: United States
- Part of: Texas
- Other regions in Texas: Bell Mountain AVA, Escondido Valley AVA, Fredericksburg in the Texas Hill Country AVA, Mesilla Valley AVA, Texas Davis Mountains AVA, Texas Hill Country AVA, Texoma AVA
- Growing season: 225 to 230 days
- Climate region: Region IV-V
- Heat units: 3800–4400 GDD
- Precipitation (annual average): 14 to 20 in (360–510 mm)
- Soil conditions: Granitic, porphrytic and volcanic rocks, as well as limestone
- Total area: 8 million acres (12,500 sq mi)
- Size of planted vineyards: 3,700+ acres (1,500+ ha)
- No. of vineyards: 18
- Grapes produced: Aglianico, Barbera, Cabernet Franc, Cabernet Sauvignon, Chardonnay, Chenin blanc, Cinsault, Dolcetto, Gewurztraminer, Grenache, Malbec, Marsanne, Merlot, Mourvèdre, Mataro, Montepulciano, Muscat Canelli, Orange Muscat, Petit Verdot, Pinot noir, Riesling, Roussanne, Sangiovese, Sauvignon Blanc, Syrah, Tannat, Tempranillo, Touriga Nacional, Zinfandel
- No. of wineries: 15

Texas High Plains is an American Viticultural Area (AVA) located on the Llano Estacado region of northwestern Texas. It was established as the nation's 118th and the state's sixth AVA on March 2, 1993, by the Bureau of Alcohol, Tobacco and Firearms (ATF), Treasury after reviewing a petition submitted by Clinton M. McPherson, on behalf of High Plains vinegrowers, proposing a viticultural area in the Texas Panhandle to be named "Texas High Plains."
The wine appellation is the second largest AVA in Texas encompassing over 8 million acres (12,500 sq mi). Most of the vineyards are on flat terrain at elevations between 3,000 and 4,000 feet (910–1,220 m) above sea level. The viticultural area also intensively cultivates cotton, sorghum and wheat as the predominant crops, irrigated from the Ogallala Aquifer. The elevations are between 3,000 and 4,000 feet (910–1,220 m) above sea level. At the outset, vineyards cultivated approximately 2,000 acres (810 ha) with a growing interest in viticulture. There were four wineries active within the viticultural area and nearly half of all commercial wine grapes grown in Texas are cultivated in the Texas High Plains. There are currently 3,700+ acres (1,500+ ha) of cultivation in the High Plains on 18 vineyards sourcing 15 wineries. The High Plains can be extremely dry, so vineyards are also irrigated from the Ogallala Aquifer.

== Boundaries ==
According to the petition, the proposed boundaries omit portions of the larger area known as the "Texas High Plains" because they have been found to be unsuitable for commercial viticulture. Over the last 20 years, observers have found that risk of freeze damage became intolerable along the New Mexico border along the western boundary of the proposed area, and to the north of the boundaries. This change in the minimum temperature during winter coincides roughly with the 4,000 feet (1,200 m) elevation of these areas, higher than most of the viticultural area. In many of the narrative descriptions and maps submitted with the petition, an escarpment called the "Caprock" is used as the eastern boundary of the Texas High Plains. Since this escarpment is not represented on the U.S.G.S. maps as a single line, the petitioner has selected the 3,000 feet (910 m) contour line as the eastern boundary for the proposed area. This contour line runs to the west of the escarpment; in some places it appears to be as much as 15 miles (24 km) to the west. The southern boundary of the viticultural area was chosen by the petitioner because, he states, it corresponds to changes in temperature, soil type and wind which alter the growing conditions significantly. His evidence will be discussed further in the sections on soil and climate.
The High Plains of Texas sits at an elevation of 3,000 and 4,000 feet (910–1,220 m) and it contains approximately 10.8 million acres (16,900 sq mi) of planted cropland and 10.4 million acres (16,200 sq mi) of range and pastureland in 42 counties.

== History ==
Wine has been made in Texas for centuries. No alcoholic beverage made from grapes appears to have been produced before the arrival of Europeans in the sixteenth century. Instead, the indigenous peoples of Meso-America made such alcoholic drinks as pulque, the forerunner of mescal, from the maguey or agave plant; tesgüino from the sprouted kernels of maize; and balché from mead, flavored from the leaves of the Lonchocarpus, a tropical tree or climbing shrub with colorful flowers. The earliest evidence of efforts to grow grapes on the Texas High Plains comes from the records of the Texas Agricultural Experiment Station in Lubbock, where it shows studies were done between 1909 and 1937 on the adaptability of many grape cultivars, including vitis vinifera. at the station. In the 1950s and '60s, French-American hybrids, American and vinifera cultivars were planted in research plots at Texas Tech University, also in Lubbock. As a result of this work, commercial viticulture began in the area in 1945, and was expanded in the 1960s and again in 1973. Llano Estacado, the first winery in the area, had its first crush in 1976. By its appellation, three more wineries were established in the Texas High Plains since then: Pheasant Ridge, CapRock Winery (now English Newsom Cellars), and La Escarbada XIT.

== Terroir ==
=== Topography ===
The petition states that the viticultural area is distinguished from the surrounding area in part by its elevation. According to the petitioner, the most pronounced change in terrain occurs at the eastern boundary of the area where an escarpment "provides an east facing wall 200–1,000 feet (61–305 m) high along the entire east boundary of the appellation, separating the Texas High Plains from the Rolling Plains to the east." The area is described in the Texas Almanac as the "largest level plain of its kind in the United States." The high plains rise gradually from 3,000 feet (910 m) in the east to more than 400 feet (120 m) in spots along the New Mexico border. Underlying the Texas High Plains is the Ogallala Aquifer. The Texas Almanac notes that this is an important source of irrigation water for crops grown in the area. The area has no major rivers, but there are numerous "playas", small intermittent lakes, scattered through the area which catch water after rains and allow it to percolate back to the aquifer.

=== Climate ===
According to the petitioner, the area is characterized by low annual rainfall, moderate temperature, and variable, but gentle, wind. According to a report on Irrigation Water Management by the Texas Water Resources Institute in August 1987, average annual rainfall within the area varies from 14 in (360 mm) near the western boundary to 20 in (510 mm) in the east. The report notes that the greatest monthly rainfall in the area occurs between May and September, a fact the petitioner attributes to warm moist air carried into the area from the Gulf of Mexico. This tropical air sometimes brings moderate to heavy thunderstorms with hail and intense winds. According to a chart from TAES, annual precipitation gradually increases to the east of the proposed area, and decreases to the west. Other charts from TAES compare the annual temperatures in various parts of Texas. Mean annual temperature varies from 580 on the north to 61 °F (16 °C) on the south of the proposed area, a range which the petitioner claims is important to the quality potential of wine grapes. The viticultural area's coldest temperatures range just above and below 0, with colder temperatures to the north, and warmer temperatures to the south. According to the petitioner, growers to the north of the boundary have abandoned plantings due to frequent freeze loss. Degree-day heat summations for the Texas High Plains are the lowest in Texas and vary from 3800 to 4400 from year to year at Lubbock. They are lower as you go north and higher as you go south or east. For each degree increase in mean temperature, you have an increase of 365 degree days. There is a considerable increase in heat summation south and southeast of the boundaries. The petitioner also notes that, due to the low relative humidity on the High Plains, there is a very low incidence of such disease and pest problems as downy mildew, Pierce's disease, phylloxera, and black rot, which are found in other parts of Texas. The USDA plant hardiness zones range from 7a to 8a.

=== Soil ===
The authors of Our Texas, Ralph W. Steen and Frances Donecker, state that the High Plains were considered a "great American desert," suitable only for grazing, until late in the nineteenth century, when the land was found to be fertile. According to a report on Conservation Tillage issued by the Texas Agricultural Experiment Station (TAES) in July 1987, soils in the area vary from predominantly brown clay loams with clay textured subsoils in the north to fine sandy loams in the central and southern regions. The Ogallala aquifer, which supports irrigation within the area, ends near the southern boundary. The lack of available groundwater results in soils which are sandy, shallow and highly eroded to the south and east of the area. The petitioner told of one vineyard south of the boundary which was abandoned due to drifting sand.

== Viticulture ==
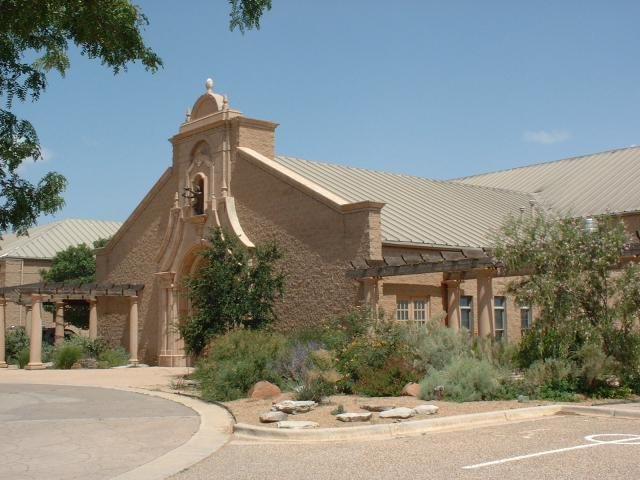
English Newsom Cellars (formerly CapRock Winery)

Commercial vineyards exists over a large part of the Texas High Plains with significant plantings in Lubbock, Hale, Floyd, Crosby, Lynn, Dawson, Lamb, Hockley, Gaines, Hockley, Yoakum, Terry, and Cochran counties and smaller vineyards in Garca, Swisher, Castro, Parmer, and Randall Counties. The only counties included within the appellation boundaries which do not presently have commercial vineyards are Bailey, and parts of Briscoe and Armstrong counties above the Caprock edge. The growing conditions in these three counties are not unlike those in neighboring counties included within the boundaries. There are at least 15 wineries resident in Texas High Plains, although many wineries also source grapes from outside of the AVA, such as, English Newsom Cellars, and Llano Estacado Winery. In a report on the 1985 Lone Star State Wine Competition, Greater Lubbock, in its November 1985, issue, noted that wineries within the proposed area won the only gold medal awarded, 60% of the silver medals, and nearly 40% of the bronze medals in the statewide competition. The Los Angeles Times, Monday, June 1, 1987, article, "Texas Wine: Taste It and Believe It" mentioned awards won by Llano Estacado and Pheasant Ridge at the 1986 San Francisco Fair and Wine Competition, competing against nearly 2,000 other wines, "including a bunch from California."

== See also ==
- Texas wine
