= Texas Davis Mountains AVA =

American Viticultural Area located in western Texas

Coordinates: 30°33′47″N 104°01′04″W

Texas Davis Mountains
- Wine region
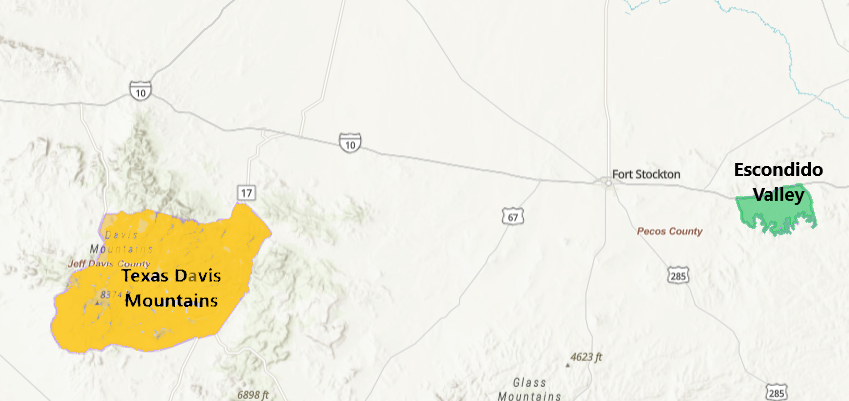
- Type: American Viticultural Area
- Year established: 1998
- Years of wine industry: 49
- Country: United States
- Part of: Texas
- Other regions in Texas: Mesilla Valley AVA, Bell Mountain AVA, Escondido Valley AVA, Fredericksburg in the Texas Hill Country AVA, Texas Hill Country AVA, Texas High Plains AVA, Texoma AVA
- Growing season: 180 days
- Climate region: Region II-IV
- Heat units: 2948–3730 GDD
- Precipitation (annual average): 20 in (510 mm)
- Soil conditions: gentle to steep gravelly soils and rock outcrop on limestone hills; rolling to steep very gravelly loamy soil
- Total area: 270,000 acres (422 sq mi)
- Size of planted vineyards: 50+ acres (20+ ha)
- No. of vineyards: 3
- Grapes produced: Cabernet Sauvignon, Cabernet Franc, Carignane, Grenache, Mourvèdre, Sauvignon Blanc, Tannat, Tempranillo, Viognier, Zinfandel
- No. of wineries: 3
- Wine produced: Cabernet Sauvignon, Chardonnay, Merlot, Pinot Noir, Riesling

Texas Davis Mountains is an American Viticultural Area (AVA) located in Jeff Davis County of the Trans-Pecos region in western Texas. The appellation was established as the nation's 132^{nd} and the state's seventh AVA on March 11, 1998 by the Bureau of Alcohol, Tobacco and Firearms (ATF), Treasury after reviewing the petition submitted by Maymie Nelda "Nell" Weisbach, of Blue Mountain Vineyard, Inc., proposing a viticultural area in Jeff Davis County to be named "Texas Davis Mountains."
The last AVA recognized in the 20th century encompasses approximately 270,000 acres (422 sq mi) and originally contained one commercial winery operated by the petitioner cultivating about 40 acres (16 ha) under vine.
The Davis Mountains in West Texas were named for Jefferson Davis, who served as the president of the Confederate States of America. Davis was stationed in the area in the 1850s, before his presidency. Surrounded by the Chihuahuan Desert, the appellation takes advantage of cooler elevations and lower annual rainfall in the Davis Mountains. The land within the boundaries of the AVA ranges between 4,500 and 8,300 feet (1,372–2,530 m) above sea level. The soil is primarily granitic, porphyritic, and volcanic in nature. The viticultural area is distinguishable from surrounding areas primarily by its altitude, which contributes to the geographic and climatic features which provide for excellent winegrowing.

== History ==
Viticulture in the Davis Mountains region dates back to the 1970s when trailblazer and pioneer Gretchen Glasscock planted the first vineyard in the area. A fourth generation Texan entrepreneur, Gretchen took over operations of a 20,000 acres (8,100 ha) South Texas ranch and mineral interests in 1976 upon her father's death. Her interest in wine and land stewardship led to a personal exploration of winegrowing. Concurrently, Texas A&M conducted a grape growing feasibility study which concluded that Texas' climate was appropriate to grow wine grapes of "everyday wine" quality, definitely not what was needed to grow grapes to make world-class wines. Gretchen challenged these findings and her research led to the Davis Mountains. She formed a coalition reaching out to other vintner pioneers in Texas, respected international wine professionals, along with a team of business entrepreneurs. After years of extensive research revealed the Davis Mountains, with its nutrient rich, volcanic soil and cool summers, would be the ideal place to grow winegrapes in Texas. Gretchen planted the first commercial vinifera vineyard in Texas, the Glasscock Vineyards in the Fort Davis Blue Mountain region which officially opened in April 1977 on 42 acres (17 ha) with 18,000 vines. Concurrently, she helped draft and promote landmark legislation, the Farm Winery Act, TX HB 2229, which laid the foundation for and enabled the development of the current multi-billion-dollar Texas wine industry. Her groundbreaking efforts were featured in the October 1979 issue of Skies of Texas Airlines magazine who referred to her as the "wine goddess of Texas." After nearly a decade pioneering winegrowing in Texas, Glasscock stepped away to pursue other business interests and management of her family's land, becoming an early adopter of Internet-based businesses, and supporting women's issues in business. In 2021, while receiving cancer treatment, Gretchen wrote a book detailing this saga,Texas Wine Pioneers: How Texas Upset the World Wine Stage and Continues to Redefine It. In the book she shares the story of her own efforts in the larger context of the growing global awareness of and appreciation for the Texas wine industry in the 1970s, 1980s and beyond.
The vineyard at Blue Mountain passed through several owners and eventually succumbed to disease. Meanwhile, the Weisbach family, Nell and Phil with their four children, lived in an adjacent ranch since the early 1970s. In the 1990s, they acquired the adjacent property with its abandoned vineyard. Nell re-energized the vineyard and sold her grapes to other Texas wineries. She enjoyed the wine business so much she opened Blue Mountain Winery and Tasting Room on the property. Her Cabernet wine won a medal as "Best in Texas" one year, as judged by the Texas Wine Growers Association (TWGGA). Nell crafted the petition for ATF review seeking AVA designation of Davis Mountains. After almost 60 years of marriage, Phil died in 2002. Nell later moved to Boulder, Colorado in February 2011 to be closer to her family.
Maura and Dan Sharp became the new stewards of this historic property in 2016, with a vacant winery and the vineyard unattended for more than a decade. They established Sharp Family Vineyards, replanted and named it "Vineyard at Blue Mountain" two years later. They cultivate up to 15 acres (6.1 ha) focused exclusively on Cabernet Sauvignon. Neighboring wineries/vineyards in the Davis Mountains region include Château Wright, which operates Jack Rabbit Winery and Blue Mountain Trail Vineyard, and Alta Marfa operated by Ricky Taylor with his wife Katie Jablonski outside Marfa.

== Terroir ==
=== Topography ===
The Davis Mountains were created about 35 million years ago by the same volcanic thrust that formed the front range of the Rockies. The mountains are composed of granitic, porphyritic and volcanic rocks, as well as limestones of various ages. The U.S.G.S. topographic maps used to define the viticultural area show a mountainous area varying in elevation from 4,500 to 8,300 feet (1,400–2,500 m), surrounded by flatter terrain. The petitioner adds that these mountains are the second-highest range in Texas. The northern and eastern limits are clearly defined by escarpments. Sharp boundaries in the west and south, however, are lacking as the same formations continue into the Ord and Del Norte Mountains. The Chihuahua Desert extends for miles in all directions, its gently rolling grasses interspersed with yucca and agave.

=== Soils ===
The Davis Mountains are the result of tectonic and volcanic activity millions of years ago. The soils on the mountain slopes are rich in granite, overlaid with loose loam and fine, mineral-rich volcanic debris, plus a quantity of limestone. The high porosity of these rock types (except the granite, of course) provides excellent drainage, but also sufficient humidity retention to allow the vines to survive during drier periods.

=== Climate ===
The cover story in "Texas," the Houston Chronicle Magazine, for June 2, 1996, titled "High mountain vistas, driving the 73-mile loop around the Davis Mountains" by Leslie Sowers, described the viticultural area as a "mountain island – that is cooler, wetter, and more biologically diverse than the vast plains of the Chihuahua Desert that surround it." The article went on to note that the Davis Mountains receive 20 inches (510 mm) of rainfall a year, contrasted with 10 inches (250 mm) annually in the surrounding desert. The USDA plant hardiness zones are 7b and 8a.

== Viticulture ==
Three vineyards now nest in the southern foothills of the Davis Mountains. The area receives cooler temperatures and more rainfall than the surrounding Chihuahuan Desert, on elevations from 4,500 to 8,300 feet (1,400–2,500 m) above sea level. The AVA label symbolizes the quality, reputation and distinguishing features of grapes grown within the region. Château Wright Winery and Vineyard is located within the AVA on the Fort Davis scenic loop. Château Wright, with its Blue Mountain Trail Vineyard, was established in 2012 and is a pioneer in the Davis Mountains AVA. Sharp Family Vineyards rebuilt and replanted the historic Blue Mountain winery property after their acquisition in 2016. Alta Marfa planted its vineyard in 2019 with owner Ricky Taylor focusing on Portuguese red varieties. Taylor predicts, "Ten years from now, there's going to be more than 10 vineyards here. I would bet on it."

== See also ==
- Texas wine
