= Texas Hill Country =

Region of Texas, United States

- Region
- Enchanted Rock State Natural Area

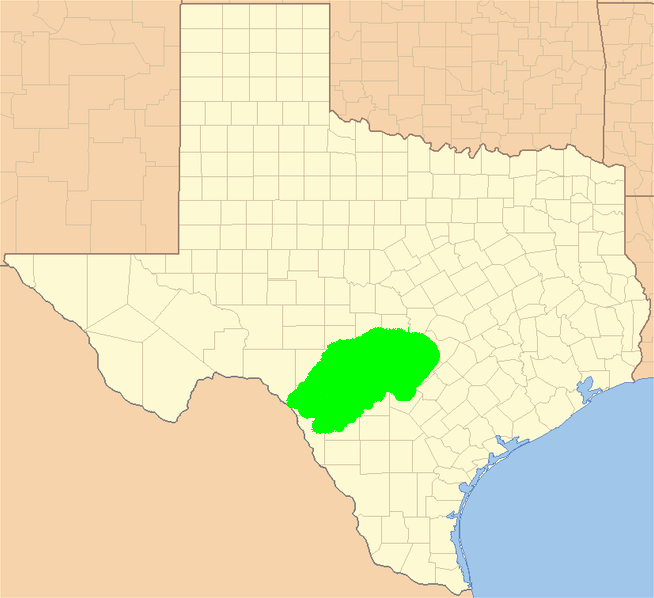
- Map of Texas Hill Country
- Coordinates: 30°10′27″N 99°03′55″W
- Location: Central Texas, United States
- Elevation: 980–2,460 ft (300–750 m)

The Texas Hill Country is a geographic region of Central and South Texas, forming the southeast part of the Edwards Plateau. Given its location, climate, terrain, and vegetation, the Hill Country can be considered one of the borders between the American South and Southwest. The region represents the very remote rural countryside of Central Texas, but also is home to growing suburban neighborhoods and affluent retirement developments.

The region is notable for its karst topography and tall rugged hills of limestone or granite. Many of the hills rise to a height of 400–500 ft (120–150 m) above the surrounding plains and valleys, with Packsaddle Mountain rising to a height of 800 ft (240 m) above the Llano River in Kingsland. The Hill Country also includes the Llano Uplift and the second-largest granite dome in the United States, Enchanted Rock. The terrain throughout the region is characterized by a thin layer of topsoil and many exposed rocks and boulders, making the region very dry and prone to flash flooding. Native vegetation in the region includes various yucca, prickly pear cactus, desert spoon, and wildflowers in the Llano Uplift. The predominant trees in the region are Ashe juniper and Texas live oak.

Bound on the east by the Balcones Escarpment, the Hill Country reaches into the far northern portions of San Antonio and western portions of Travis County including the cities of Austin and Lago Vista. As a result of springs discharging water stored in the Edwards Aquifer, several cities such as Austin, San Marcos, and New Braunfels were settled at the base of the escarpment. As of 2016, the region's economy was one of the fastest growing in the United States. The Texas Hill Country has emerged as one of the United States' most prominent glamping destinations, driven by its temperate year-round climate, limestone hill topography, and proximity to Austin. Texas Monthly described the Hill Country as "the state's glamping capital" in a 2024 feature on the growth of luxury outdoor accommodation across Texas.

== History and politics ==
During the American Civil War, due to its large, pro-Union, German immigrant population, the Hill Country opposed Texas seceding from the Union. In the three quarters of a century following Reconstruction, the core of the Hill Country generally provided the solitary support base for the Republican Party in what became a one-party Democratic state.

Even when no Republicans were in the Texas Legislature during the 1930s and 1940s, Gillespie and Kendall Counties backed every Republican presidential nominee except Herbert Hoover in 1932, and Republicans continued to control local government. Guadalupe and Comal Counties were less Republican, but still did not vote for Democratic nominees except in the 1912, 1932, 1936, and 1964 landslides. The region was also the only one in antebellum slave states to back the insurgent candidacy of Robert La Follette in 1924. In fact, Comal was La Follette's top county in the nation with 73.96% of the vote, and Gillespie and Comal were the only counties south of the Mason–Dixon line to give a plurality to his "Progressive" ticket.

== Geography ==
Because of its karst topography, the area has a number of caverns, such as Inner Space Caverns, Natural Bridge Caverns, Bracken Cave, Longhorn Cavern State Park, Cascade Caverns, Caverns of Sonora and Cave Without a Name. The area's deeper caverns form several aquifers, which serve as a source of drinking water for its residents. Wonder Cave in San Marcos was formed by an earthquake along the Balcones Fault. From east to west, Texas Hill Country is where the Southern United States ends and the Southwestern United States begins.

Several tributaries of the Colorado River in Texas—including the Llano and Pedernales Rivers, which cross the region west to east and join the Colorado as it cuts across the region to the southeast—drain a large portion of the Hill Country. The Guadalupe, San Antonio, Frio, Medina, and Nueces Rivers originate in the Hill Country.

The Guadalupe River is prone to flash flooding due to a combination of topography, geology, and climate; Texas Hill Country is often called Flash Flood Alley. Significant floods occurred in 1978, 1987, 1998, 2002, and 2025.

This region is a dividing line for certain species occurrence. For example, the California fan palm (Washingtonia filifera) is the only species of palm tree native to the continental United States west of the Hill Country's Balcones Fault.

== Culture ==
The area experiences a fusion of English, Spanish, and German influences in food, beer, architecture, and music that form a distinctively Texan culture separate from the state's Southern and Southwestern influences. For example, the accordion was popularized in Tejano music in the 19th century due to cultural exposure to German settlers.

Devil's Backbone is an elevated, winding stretch of Ranch to Market Road 32 between Wimberley and Blanco. It has long been the subject of ghost stories. Folklore about it appeared in a 1996 episode of NBC's Robert Stack anthology series Unsolved Mysteries, featuring apparitional Spanish monks, Comanche, and Lipan Apache tribes, Confederate soldiers on their horses, and a spirit of a wolf.

The region has emerged as the center of the Texas wine industry. Three American Viticultural Areas are in the area: Texas Hill Country AVA, Fredericksburg in the Texas Hill Country AVA, and Bell Mountain AVA.

== Counties ==
According to the Texas Parks and Wildlife Department, these 27 counties are included in the Hill Country Wildlife District:

- Bandera
- Bell
- Blanco
- Bosque
- Burnet
- Comal
- Coryell
- Crockett
- Edwards
- Gillespie
- Hamilton
- Hays
- Kendall
- Kerr
- Kimble
- Lampasas
- Llano
- Mason
- McCulloch
- Menard
- Real
- San Saba
- Schleicher
- Sutton
- Travis
- Val Verde
- Williamson

== Gallery ==
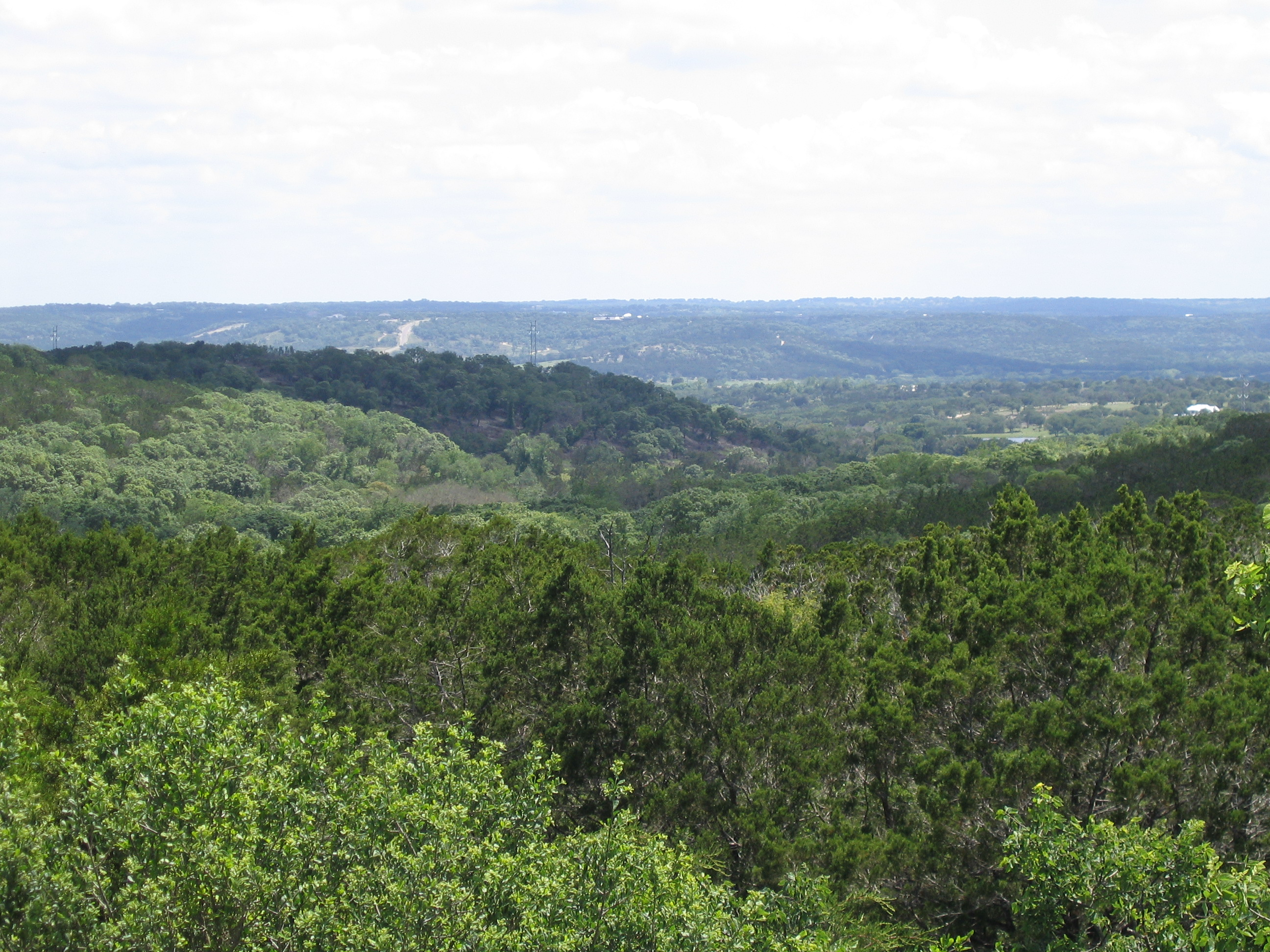
As seen from near I-10

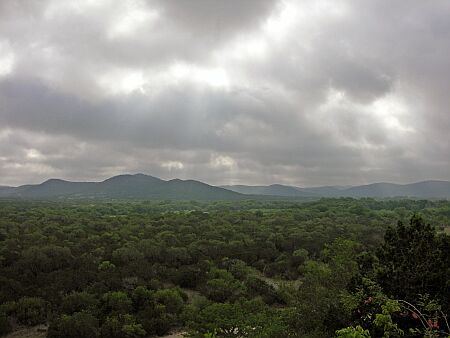
View of the Texas Hill Country, from Garner State Park, located in Uvalde County

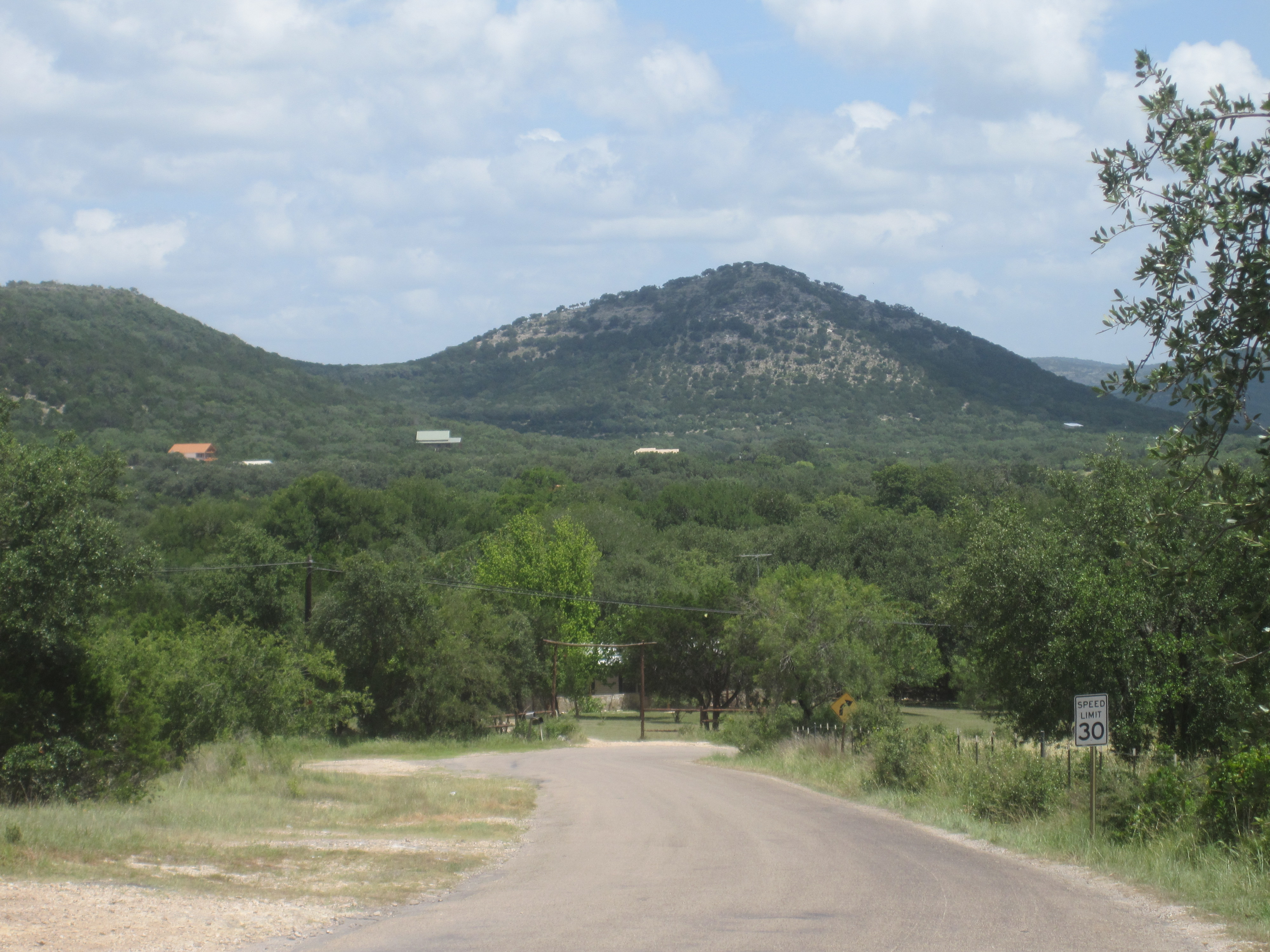
Another scene from near Garner State Park

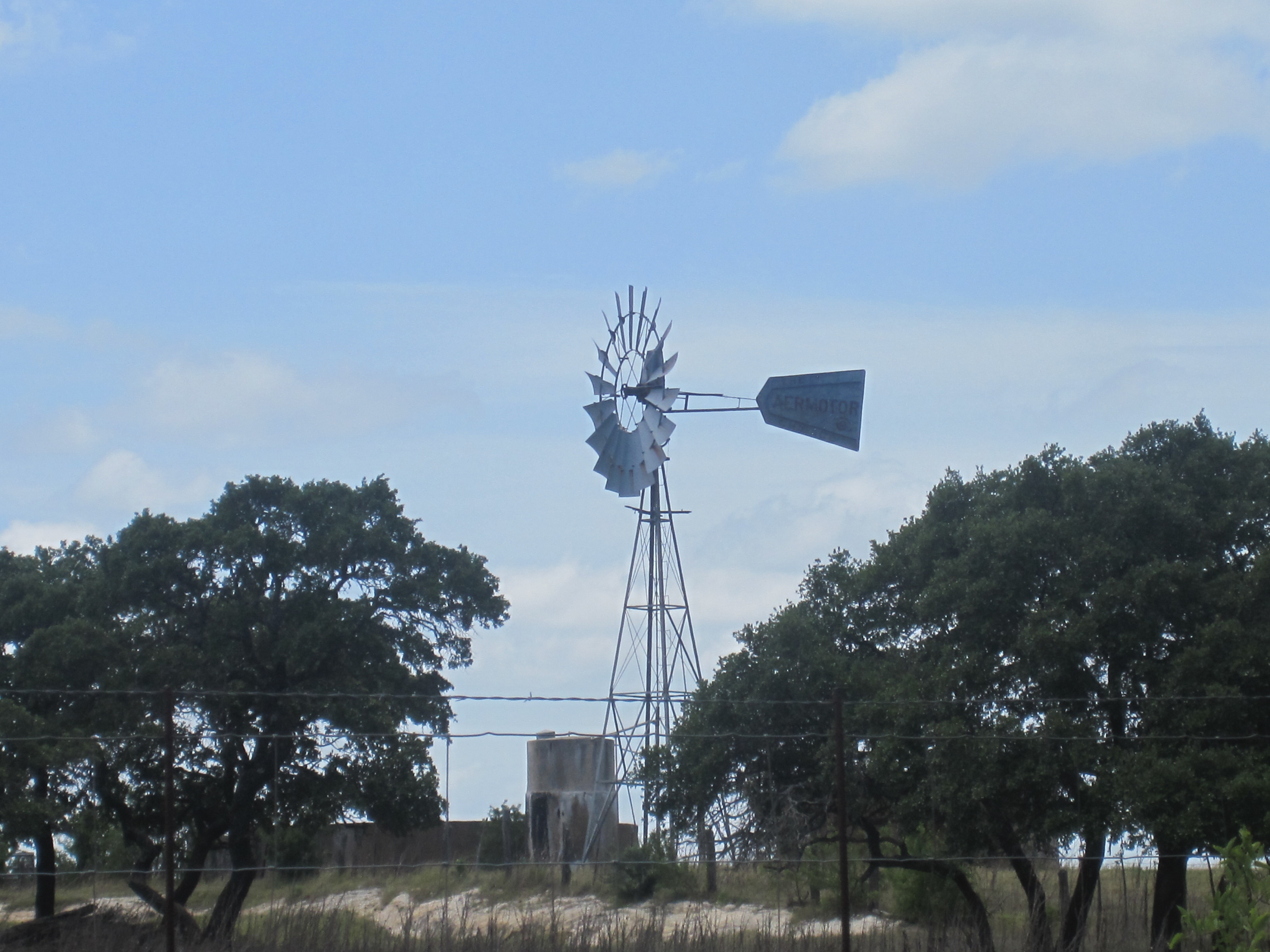
Windmill in the Hill Country

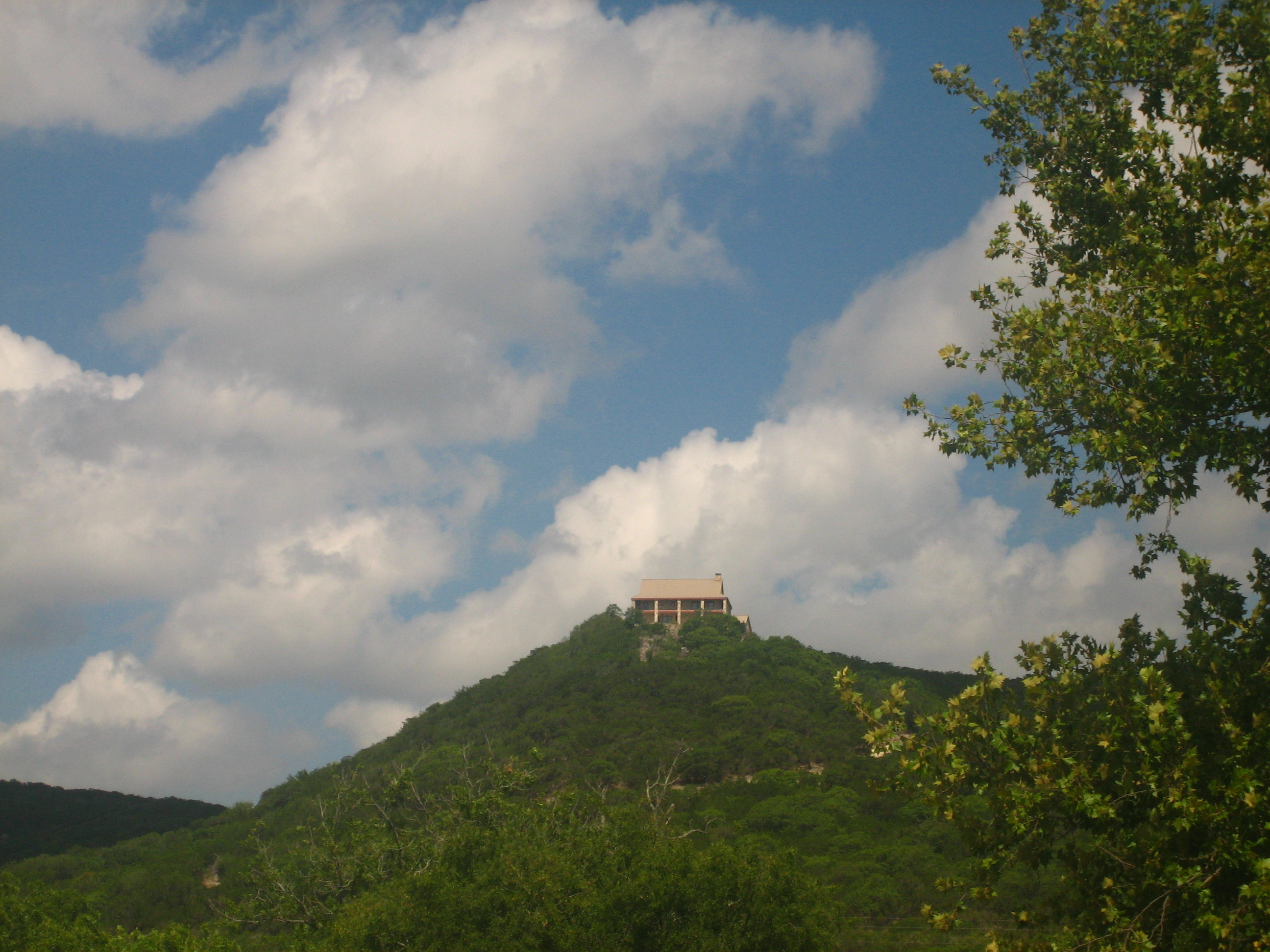
House atop hill in Texas Hill Country north of Bandera

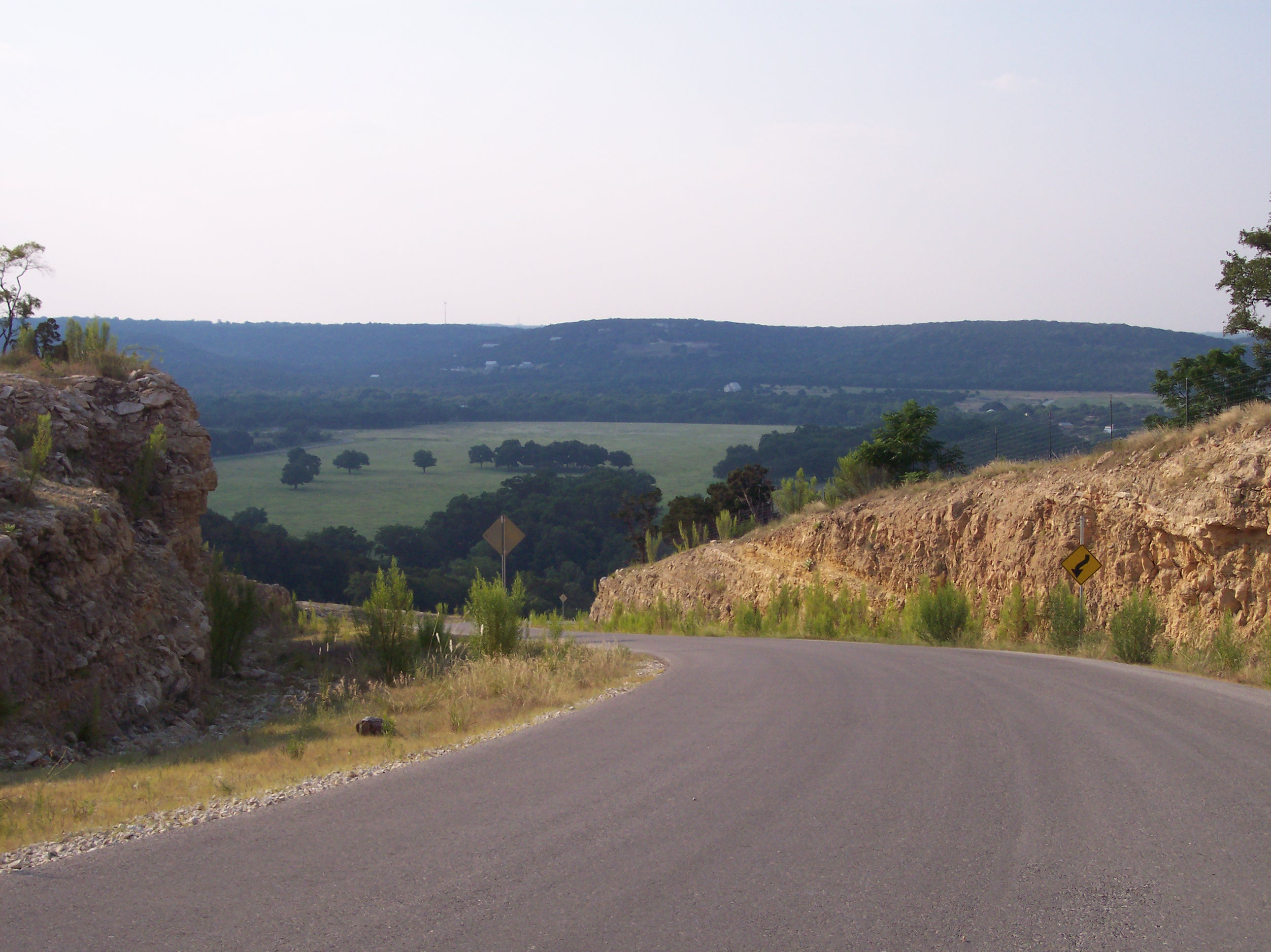
A view of the Texas Hill Country from a rural road in Hays County

== Notable people ==
Notable people
Name	Birth	Death	Notes
Lance Armstrong	1971	—	Professional cyclist renowned for seven consecutive Tour de France wins after surviving cancer. He was stripped of his seven Tour de France titles over a doping controversy. He was born in Plano, but is a long-time resident of Austin.
Drew Brees	1979	—	Super Bowl winning quarterback for the New Orleans Saints. Attended Westlake High School in Austin.
Buffalo Hump	c 1800	1870	War chief of the Penateka band of the Comanche
Liz Carpenter	1920	2010	A journalist, author, political speech writer, humorist, public speaker, and the first female vice president of University of Texas student body, she is one of the founders of National Women's Political Caucus and co-chair of ERAmerica, traveling the country to push for passage of the Equal Rights Amendment. She drafted President Johnson's November 22, 1963, speech to the American public after the assassination of John F. Kennedy.
Joe Castro	1970	—	A special effects artist and film director who grew up in Helotes, making his early films in Hill Country.
Jody Conradt	1941	—	A retired women's basketball head coach, she was inducted into the Basketball Hall of Fame in 1998, Women's Basketball Hall of Fame in 1999, and the Texas Women's Hall of Fame 1986. She was born in Goldthwaite and resides in Austin. She is the first women's basketball collegiate coach to reach 700 career victories, yet she achieved a 99% graduation rate for the students on her teams.
Michael Dell	1965	—	Founder of Dell computers, he started the company in Austin and still resides there.
Shelley Duvall	1949	2024	Actress, including The Shining, Popeye. Fort Worth-born, retired to Blanco, in Hill Country, from her long time base in California.
John Henry Faulk	1913	1990	Austin-based radio personality, author, playwright, folklorist, actor, lecturer, blacklisted during the 1950s
Kinky Friedman	1944	2024	American singer, songwriter, novelist, humorist, politician and columnist. Born in Chicago but grew up in Austin. Resided at Echo Hill Ranch near Kerrville. Founded Utopia Animal Rescue Ranch, also located near Kerrville.
Fred Gipson	1908	1973	Novelist who authored Old Yeller, Savage Sam, and Hound Dog Man, lived in Mason
Trey Hardee	1984	—	World Champion Decathlete and graduate of the University of Texas at Austin
Harvey Hilderbran	1960	—	State Representative from the western Hill Country since 1989, a Republican from Kerrville
Max Hirsch	1880	1969	National Museum of Racing and Hall of Fame thoroughbred horse trainer
Betty Holekamp	1826	1902	German Texas pioneer, also called the "Betsy Ross of Texas"
Carl Hoppe	1897	1981	San Antonio artist who painted scenes of the Texas Hill Country
Molly Ivins	1944	2007	Political author, journalist, humorist from Austin
Lady Bird Johnson	1912	2007	Former First Lady of the United States, Graduate of University of Texas in Austin. Business woman and one-time owner of KTBC radio and television stations turned $17,500 investment into more than $150 million. She bankrolled her husband's initial political career. Buried in Stonewall next to husband Lyndon B. Johnson. Lady Bird Johnson Wildflower Center is named for her decades-long project to beautify America's landscapes
Lyndon B. Johnson	1908	1973	Former President of the United States, born and raised in Stonewall.
Tommy Lee Jones	1946	—	Actor, born in San Saba.
Robert Earl Keen	1956	—	Country singer-songwriter, former resident of Bandera, Texas and current resident of Kerrville, Texas
Ben Kweller	1981	—	Recording artist, singer-songwriter, and actor. Originally from Greenville; now resides in Dripping Springs.
Janis Joplin	1943	1970	Singer and songwriter, born in Port Arthur
Herman Lehmann	1859	1932	Apache captive and then Comanche adoptee (adopted son of Chief Quanah Parker), native of Loyal Valley, 1927 autobiography, Nine Years Among the Indians
Hermann Lungkwitz	1813	1891	Romantic landscape artist and photographer, noted for first pictorial records of the Texas Hill Country
Gerald Lyda	1923	2005	General contractor and cattle rancher, born and raised in the Hill Country community of Marble Falls
Johnny Manziel	1992	—	The first freshman to win Heisman trophy and quarterback for the Texas A&M University Aggies, from Kerrville
Samuel Maverick	1803	1870	Texas lawyer, politician, land baron and signer of the Texas Declaration of Independence. His name is the source of the term "maverick", first cited in 1867, which means "independently minded".
Matthew McConaughey	1969	—	Model/Actor, raised in Uvalde; attended The University of Texas at Austin
Ben McKenzie	1978	—	Actor (The O.C., Southland, Gotham), attended Stephen F. Austin High School in Austin
John O. Meusebach	1812	1897	Founder of Fredericksburg negotiated 1847 Meusebach-Comanche Treaty (unbroken to this date) with Comanche chiefs Buffalo Hump, Santa Anna, Old Owl. Oversaw development of New Braunfels. Elected Texas State Senator for Bexar, Comal and Medina Counties. Buried Marschall-Meusebach Cemetery in Loyal Valley
Willie Nelson	1933	—	American country singer-songwriter, author, poet, actor and activist. Austin resident
Elisabet Ney	1833	1907	Sculptor, art pioneer, works can be found in the Smithsonian American Art Museum, Texas State Capitol, U.S. Capitol
Chester W. Nimitz	1885	1966	Commander of U.S. Naval forces in the Pacific during World War II was from Fredericksburg and Kerrville
Old Owl	c 1795	1849	Civil Chief of the Penateka band of the Comanche Indians
Alfred P.C. Petsch	1887	1981	Lawyer, legislator, civic leader, and philanthropist. Served in the Texas House of Representatives 1925–1941. Veteran of both World War I and World War II.
Ann Richards	1933	2006	Governor of Texas (1991–1995). Resided in Austin.
Andy Roddick	1982	—	Former professional tennis player who resides in Austin.
Santa Anna	c 1795	1849	War Chief of the Penateka band of the Comanche Indians
Juan Nepomuceno Seguín	1806	1890	Served on both sides during the Texas Revolution. Fought with Sam Houston and organized a Tejano rear guard. 1834 Territorial Governor of Texas, 1841 Mayor of San Antonio. Suspicions of his loyalty caused him to flee to Mexico in 1842. Served with Mexico's General Adrian Woll and participated in Woll's 1842 invasion of Texas. Seguin, Texas, is named in his honor.
Sixpence None the Richer	1992	—	An alternative rock band prominent in the late 1990s with their song "Kiss Me"
Frank Van der Stucken	1858	1929	Music composer, conductor
Stevie Ray Vaughan	1954	1990	Virtuoso Blues guitar player and singer who resided in Austin.

== See also ==
- Adelsverein
- Balcones Canyonlands National Wildlife Refuge
- Cherry Springs Dance Hall
- German Texan
- List of geographical regions in Texas
- Mount Bonnell
- Revolutions of 1848
- Enchanted Rock
