= Escondido Valley AVA =

American Viticultural Area located in western Texas

Coordinates: 30°18′54″N 98°55′28″W

Escondido Valley
- Wine region
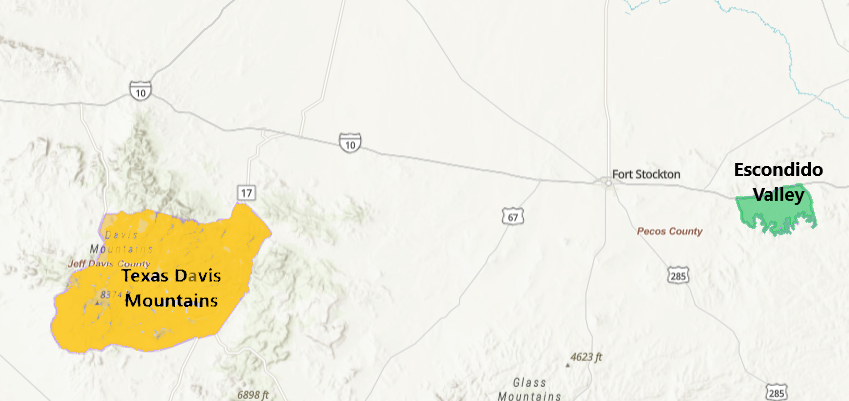
- Type: American Viticultural Area
- Year established: 1992
- Years of wine industry: 42
- Country: United States
- Part of: Texas
- Other regions in Texas: Bell Mountain AVA, Fredericksburg in the Texas Hill Country AVA, Mesilla Valley AVA, Texas Davis Mountains AVA, Texas Hill Country AVA, Texas High Plains AVA, Texoma AVA
- Growing season: 239 days
- Climate region: Region V
- Heat units: 4008+ GDD
- Precipitation (annual average): 15.11 in (384 mm)
- Soil conditions: gentle to steep gravelly soils and rock outcrop on limestone hills; rolling to steep very gravelly loamy soil
- Total area: 32,000 acres (50 sq mi)
- Size of planted vineyards: 235 acres (95 ha)
- No. of vineyards: 1
- Grapes produced: Cabernet Sauvignon, Chardonnay, Pinot Noir
- No. of wineries: 0
- Wine produced: Cabernet Sauvignon, Chardonnay, Merlot, Pinot Noir, Riesling

Escondido Valley is an American Viticultural Area (AVA) located in Pecos County of the Trans-Pecos region in western Texas. It was established as the nation's 116^{th} and the state's fifth appellation on May 19, 1992 by the Bureau of Alcohol, Tobacco and Firearms (ATF), Treasury after reviewing the petition submitted by Mr. Leonard Garcia of Cordier Estates, Inc., proposing a viticultural area in Pecos County to be named "Escondido Valley." The diminutive viticultural area encompasses approximately 32,000 acres (50 sq mi) and contained one commercial winery operated by the petitioner cultivating about 250 acres (100 ha) under vine.
In 2022, the AVA's sole winery filed bankruptcy and eventually liquidated operations auditioning off all its equipment. Its vineyards were abandoned after 35 years yielding quality fruit.

== History ==
The petition presented a series of old maps and accounts of early travelers to Pecos County which referred to the creek which runs through the area as Escondido Creek, and to the three springs which feed the creek as Upper, Middle and Lower Escondido Springs. The petition stated that "many members of the old settler families told me that the Indians called the area "Valle Escondido," (/bˈaʎe ˌeskondˈiðo/ VA-ye es-kon-DI-do), Spanish for "Hidden Valley." The petitioner submitted an extract from the Springs of Texas, by Gunnar Brune, which quotes a description of the proposed area by a traveler in 1849: ". . . we came upon a clear and beautiful spring gushing from the limestone bluff on the N side of the valley. This is the Escondido." In the late 19th century, the name Tunis, or Tunas, began to be used for the creek and springs, and these features are presently known as Tunas Creek and Tunas Springs. However, the petitioner pointed out the name East Escondido Spring still appears on the 1973 revision of the United States Geological Survey map used to delineate the boundaries of the proposed area. The petitioner also presented a letter from the Curator of the Fort Stockton Historical Society, who said "Escondido is the historical name for the springs and creek as well as the draw or valley now known as Tunas. In essence Tunas and Escondido are synonymous."

Escondido Valley viticulture history began in the 1980s when the Ste. Genevieve Winery was built nearby Fort Stockton between 1981 and 1984 on 1,300 acres (530 ha) owned by the University of Texas, by its partnership with a group of American and French investors named Gill-Richter-Cordier, Inc. Domaine Cordier from Bordeaux, France, drove the winery's development and established a substantial grape-growing operation with nearly 1,000 acres (400 ha) dedicated to varietals such as Pinot Noir, Chardonnay, and Cabernet Sauvignon. A forerunner of the now-touted Texas wine industry, it was at one time the largest winery in the Lone Star State bottling wines for other small wineries supplying "house" wines for many East Coast restaurants. The partnership of the University of Texas System and the University Lands Office added a unique facet to this endeavor since profits from this viticulture venture provided funding to the University of Texas and Texas A&M University. This cooperation between academic institutions and private businesses was uncommon within the Texas wine industry. The University of Texas owns 2.1 million acres (3,300 sq mi) of land across nineteen counties in West Texas accumulated since 1839. About 190,863 acres (298 sq mi) are in Pecos County. In 2005, the winery was purchased by Mesa Vineyards. However, a series of events, including a 2014 late-April freeze that wiped out the entire grape harvest for that season, and the nationwide restaurant closures the winery supplied due to COVID-19, led to financial reversals. In 2022, Mesa Vineyards filed for bankruptcy and eventually the winery's liquidation. Ste. Genevieve was a stable business that contributed to the Pecos County economy for 35 years and its shuttering sullied the viticulture cachet in a region known more for fracking and cattle ranching.

== Terroir ==
=== Topography ===
The "Escondido Valley" viticultural area topography is unique as the valley floor is 2,600 to 2,700 feet (790–820 m) above sea level bounded on the north and south by ranges of mesas. The boundary on the eastern end of the viticultural area is a trail which crosses the draw. Northeast of the trail, the valley floor begins to drop in elevation, and to the east and southeast of the trail are mesa ranges of higher elevation. The western boundary is represented by a line drawn between the western ends of the north and south boundaries just before the distance between mesas increases and the ground begins to rise. The bases of the mesa ranges which are used as the north and south boundaries of the area are approximately 2,900 ft (880 m), and the mesa ranges rise to elevations from 3,200 feet (980 m) to over 3,400 feet (1,000 m). East of the area, the valley floor drops to 2,200 feet (670 m), and west of the western boundary of the area, the land rises to 3,100 feet (940 m) or more. Until the 1960s, the area had three natural springs.

=== Soils ===
The petitioner submitted a U.S. Department of Agriculture General Soil Map of Pecos County, Texas, showing the predominant soils in the viticultural area are of the Reagan-Hodgkins-Iraan association (Deep, nearly level loamy soils; on uplands and flood plains). These soils extend beyond the boundary to the east and west, but the map shows that the predominant soils on the higher ground to the north and south belong to the Ector-Sanderson-Rock outcrop group (Very shallow to shallow and deep, gently to steep gravelly soils; and rock outcrop; on limestone hills and in loamy soils.

=== Climate ===
The petitioner notes that bud break occurs in the second or third week of March in the viticultural area, and the harvest begins in the third or fourth week of August. The petitioner submitted temperature and rainfall data from the National Oceanic and Atmospheric Administration's Climatological Data Annual Summary, supplemented by measurements taken in his vineyard during 1990–1992. There are no official weather stations within the viticultural area; the closest is in Bakersfield, six miles to the east. The petitioner contrasted the Bakersfield readings with those from Fort Stockton, Texas, 19 miles to the west of the viticultural area, and Ozona, 81 miles to the east of the viticultural area. According to this summary, the average annual temperature from 1979 to 1989 at Bakersfield was 66.6 °F (19.2 °C), 75 °F (24 °C) during the growing season. During the same period, the annual average for Fort Stockton was 64.4 °F (18.0 °C), 72.5 °F (22.5 °C) during the growing season, and in Ozona the average was 63.6 °F (17.6 °C) for the year and 72 °F (22 °C) for the growing season. The summary also showed the average annual rainfall from 1979 to 1989 was 14.6 inches (370 mm) at Bakersfield, of which 7.2 inches (180 mm) fell during the growing season. The average for this same period at Fort Stockton was 15 inches (380 mm) for the year and 7.07 inches (180 mm) for the growing season. In Ozona, the average was 18.1 inches (460 mm) for the year, and 9.7 inches (250 mm) for the growing season. The petitioner's own record of temperature and rainfall during the last two years showed slightly warmer temperatures and less rainfall than at Bakersfield. The vineyards are irrigated from wells, using the pressurized drip system. The petition included two letters from Terry Wigham of the U.S. Department of Agriculture's Soil Conservation Service which describe the well water within the viticultural area as lower in total dissolved solids, and therefore higher in quality, than well water elsewhere within Pecos County. The USDA plant hardiness zone is 8b.

== Viticulture ==
The region was home to extensive vineyards during the days of Ste. Genevieve. However, changes in ownership and financial troubles over the decades resulted in the abandonment of the area's vineyards. According to one wine expert, only a few hundred acres of vines survive today from the initial investment. Although Ste. Genevieve Winery still exists outside the AVA, the Escondido Valley is largely empty today, despite its well-suited topography, soil and climate. The Texas Hill Country AVA is a popular destination for vinophiles and the Escondido Valley AVA has the potential to become lucrative as the Texas High Plains AVA or any of the other Texan AVAs.

== See also ==
- Texas wine
