= Texas Hill Country AVA =

American Viticultural Area located in central Texas

Coordinates: 30°29′06″N 98°04′17″W

Texas Hill Country
- Wine region
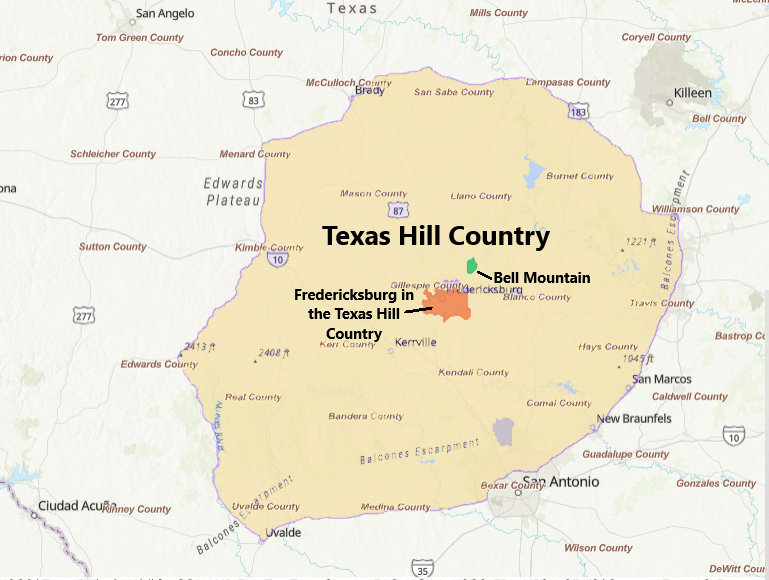
- Type: American Viticultural Area
- Year established: 1991
- Years of wine industry: 51
- Country: United States
- Part of: Texas
- Other regions in Texas: Escondido Valley AVA, Mesilla Valley AVA, Texas Davis Mountains AVA, Texas High Plains AVA, Texoma AVA
- Sub-regions: Bell Mountain AVA, Fredericksburg in the Texas Hill Country AVA
- Growing season: 216–235 days
- Climate region: Region II-III
- Precipitation (annual average): 24 to 28 in (610–710 mm)
- Soil conditions: Sandy loam over nutrient rich reddish clay
- Total area: 9.6 million acres (15,000 sq mi)
- Size of planted vineyards: 2,000+ acres (810+ ha)
- No. of vineyards: 35+
- Grapes produced: Aglianico, Alicante Bouschet, Barbera, Blanc du Bois, Cabernet Franc, Cabernet Sauvignon, Carignane, Chardonnay, Chenin Blanc, Cinsault, Graciano, Grenache, Lenoir, Malbec, Marsanne, Merlot, Montepulciano, Mourvèdre, Muscat Canelli, Nero d'Avola, Norton, Petit Sirah, Picpoul, Pinot Blanc, Pinot Gris, Pinot Noir, Riesling, Roussanne, Sangiovese, Sauvignon Blanc, Syrah, Tannat, Tempranillo, Touriga Nacional, Vermentino, Viognier, Zinfandel
- Varietals produced: Bordeaux blends, Italian
- No. of wineries: 100+

Texas Hill Country is an American Viticultural Area (AVA) located in Central Texas north and west of the portion of the Balcones Fault which runs west of the cities of San Antonio and Austin, respectively. The 9.6-million-acre (15,000 sq mi) appellation expands across the Edwards Plateau. It was established as the nation's 114th and the state's fourth AVA on November 29, 1991 by the Bureau of Alcohol, Tobacco and Firearms (ATF), Treasury after reviewing a petition submitted by Mr. Edwin Auler, on behalf of Hill Country winery and vineyard owners, proposing a viticultural area in central Texas, to be known as "Hill Country."

The petitioner subsequently amended the petition to request that the name be changed to "Texas Hill Country." It is the state's southernmost viticultural area and geographically the third largest AVA after Upper Mississippi River Valley and Ohio River Valley. At the outset, there were 40 "commercial and/or significant experimental" vineyards and 10 commercial wineries, but, after 35 years, there are approximately 100 wineries/vineyards. There are two previously established viticultural areas entirely encompassed within Texas Hill Country. The sub-appellations are "Bell Mountain" (1986) and "Fredericksburg in the Texas Hill Country" (1988), both located within Gillespie County.

== History ==
Wine has been made in Texas for centuries and within the Texas Hill Country on a small scale "for the better part of 150 years." No alcoholic beverage made from grapes appears to have been produced before the arrival of Europeans in the sixteenth century. Instead, the indigenous peoples of Meso-America made such alcoholic drinks as pulque, the forerunner of mescal, from the maguey or agave plant; tesgüino from the sprouted kernels of maize; and balché from mead, flavored from the leaves of the Lonchocarpus, a tropical tree or climbing shrub with colorful flowers.

Within the Hill Country, Fredericksburg was founded May 5, 1846, by German immigrants under the auspices of the Society for the Protection of German Immigrants in Texas. The first colonization was of New Braunfels in 1845. A few years later, Fort Martin Scott was established southeast of Fredericksburg. The Commissioner General of the Society, also known as the "Adelsverein," was Baron Ottfried Hans Von Meusebach, a German nobleman who took the name of John O. Meusebach once settled in Fredericksburg. The city of Fredericksburg derived its name from the nobleman Prince Frederick of Prussia, who was the highest-ranking member of the "Adelsverein." This society sponsored the colonization of the Fisher-Miller Land Grant in Central Texas. Vineyards were confined during this time to a very small number of Germans in the eastern settlements. The few vineyards which were established often drew favorable comments from observers, who foresaw a great future for this agricultural specialty. More common was the practice of making wine from wild grapes, principally the variety known as the Mustang, which was found in abundance in the valleys of the Colorado, San Antonio, and Guadalupe Rivers and their tributaries. The abundance of wild grapes convinced the early settlers that domesticated types would also thrive, and vine clippings brought from Europe were planted by Germans in the very first year at New Braunfels and shortly thereafter around Castroville. Experiments continued for a number of years in the western settlements, including the hill on the north side of Fredericksburg, but in the end it was realized that the imported European vines would not grow properly in Texas, and viticulture was, with few exceptions, abandoned. A commercial winery existed as late as the post-World War II period in Fredericksburg, selling products made from wild grapes and berries, but the wine was made primarily for home use to satisfy a cultural beverage preference.

In the Texoma region, 19th century American horticulturist and viticulturist Thomas Volney "T.V." Munson planted his experimental vineyards. An expert on native grape varieties, he was particularly excited by the varieties of native grapes found within the region, calling the area his "grape paradise." He developed over 300 new grape varieties from the wild grapes growing along the bluffs of the Red River and its tributaries. Munson made extensive use of American native grape species, and devoted a great deal of his life to collecting and documenting them. He released hundreds of named cultivars, but his work identifying American native grape, specifically Texan varietals, is of great significance today for their use in rootstock. Though breeding for wine quality seems to have occupied a great proportion of his effort, his work on rootstock development, grafting Vitis vinifera grapevines onto native American varieties, had the greatest impact on viticulture. This work provided French grape growers with phylloxera-resistant rootstocks, allowing them to recover from the devastating 1870 epidemic and continue to grow the ancient Vitis vinifera cultivars. These rootstocks are still used worldwide.

Consequently, Fredericksburg area viticulture produced unique vintages that will parallel and/or supplement the peach industry for which Fredericksburg has long been renown. Vitis vinifera varieties have been commercially grown in Hill Country since the mid-1970's. At the outset, there were ten wineries and 40 "commercial and/or significant experimental" vineyards in the viticultural area, according to the petition. There are two previously established AVAs within the area, both in Gillespie County. "Bell Mountain" consists of approximately 5 square miles (3,200 acres) on the south and southwest slopes of the mountain of the same name. The area is uniquely distinguished from the surrounding areas by its slightly acid soil and by the topographical limits of its location, which result in cooler and drier air than in the nearby valleys. "Fredericksburg in the Texas Hill Country" is a 110-square-mile (70,000-acre) "bowl" shaped area that ranges from 1,500 to 1,900 ft (460–580 m) in elevation. Its altitude provides cooler night time temperatures in summer and a longer winter dormancy period. These features, along with soil composed of a sandy loam topsoil over a nutrient rich reddish clay, distinguish it from the immediately surrounding areas.

== Terroir ==
=== Topography ===
As previously indicated, the Texas Hill Country covers the eastern two- thirds of the Edwards Plateau, which ends at the Balcones Fault. The name Balcones, "balcony" in Spanish, is suggested by the pronounced drop in elevation from the Edwards Plateau to the Blackland Prairie, to the east. Furthermore, the higher land of the southeast edge of the Edwards Plateau has been severely eroded by the flow of numerous rivers and streams, and portions were raised by volcanic activity and geological upheavals. This has left the Texas Hill Country as a region of low mountains, hills, canyons and valleys. The petitioner contrasts this hilly terrain with the surrounding areas (the Rio Grande Plains, the Blackland Prairies, and the North Central Plains) which are all characterized by flatter terrain. The terrain of the Texas Hill Country varies from about 650 to 2,550 feet (200–780 m) above sea level.

=== Climate ===
The climate of the Texas Hill Country is distinguished from the surrounding areas by a number of different factors. The Blackland Prairies and Rio Grande Plains which border the Texas Hill Country on the east and south are classified as humid subtropical characterized by hot days, warm nights, and usually humid weather. This is attributed to the influence of warm, moist winds off the Gulf of Mexico during the growing season. Since the Texas Hill Country is located further inland and at a higher altitude than the Blackland Prairies and Rio Grande Plains, the air is drier and has a greater proclivity for giving up heat at night. The resulting cooler, drier nights within the viticultural area are beneficial in the growing of vinifera grapes, according to the petitioner. The Texas Hill Country is subject to winds which flow over the deserts of Chihuahua and Coahuila in Mexico and north over the Edwards Plateau and the Hill Country during much of the growing season. These desert winds subside and cool at night, and tend to pool. Since the Texas Hill Country slopes from west to east, the cool, dry air which collects in the evening flows, or drains, across the area very rapidly, resulting in cooler nighttime temperatures. Although these same desert winds fl6w over the Low Rolling Plains to the north of the Texas Hill Country, the plains are flat to rolling in topography with the result that the air movement and nighttime cooling are less rapid than in the viticultural area. Finally, while the climate of the Texas Hill Country is similar to the rest of the Edwards Plateau, the Texas Hill Country is distinguishable in that it has a higher average rainfall. The western portion of the Edwards Plateau averages 16 to 22 in (410–560 mm) of rainfall per year, while the Texas Hill Country averages 24 to 28 in (610–710 mm) per year. The plant hardiness zones range from 8a to 9a.

=== Soil ===
The petitioner submitted evidence that most of the hills of the region are limestone, sandstone or granite in nature, while the valleys usually contain varying types of sandy and/or clay loam, most of a calcareous nature, but many with different underlying characters due to the complex geology of the region. With the original petition, the petitioner provided a U.S. Department of Agriculture description of various soils in the area. According to this document, the main soil series associated with the eastern two-thirds of the Edwards Plateau (i.e., Texas Hill Country) are the Tarrant, Eckrant, Brackett and Tobosa, with Frio, Oakalla and Dev in the bottom lands. By way of comparison, the main soil series associated with the western portion of the Edwards Plateau are Ector, Upton and Reagan. In addition, the petition identifies Claresville, Elmendorf, Floresville, Miguel and Webb as the main soils associated with the Rio Grande Plains to the.south of the Texas Hill Country. The Blackland Prairies to the east and northeast are composed mainly of the Houston Black, Heiden, and Austin soil series, while the main soil series for the Low Rolling Plains to the north are Abilene, Rowena, Mereta. and Lueders.

== Viticulture ==
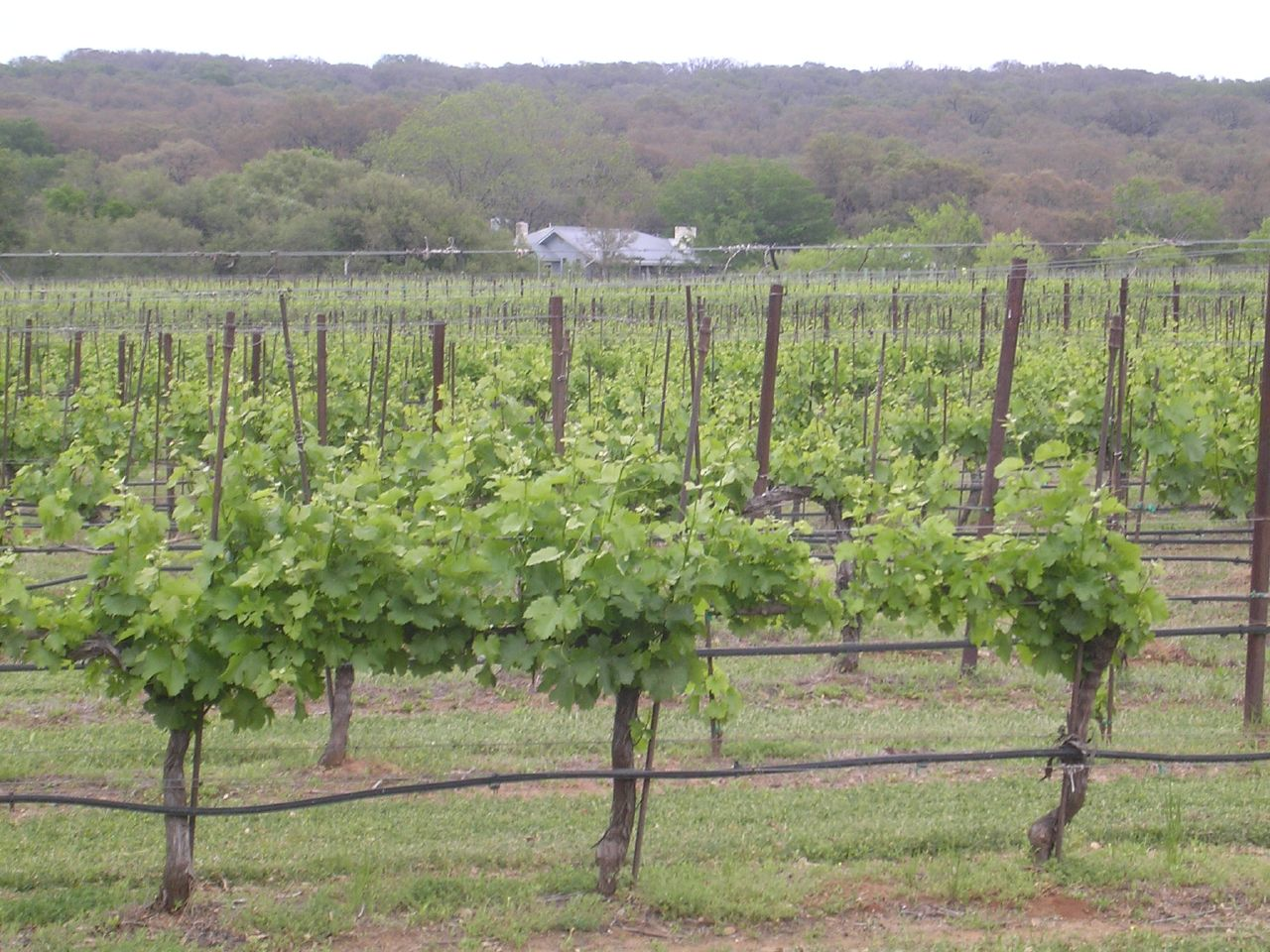
A vineyard near Johnson City, Texas

Despite the cultural influence of the German settlers, most of the grape varietals grown in the Texas Hill Country originate from France, Italy, or Spain rather than the cooler climate of Germany. Fall Creek is the original vineyard of Texas Hill Country, owned by the pioneer vintners in the area, Susan and Ed Auler. The couple established the vineyard in 1975 after noticing the similarities between the soil and the climate in Texas' Hill Country and southern France. Winery Road is the name of the "wine trail" along U.S. Highway 290 accessible to many of the Hill Country wineries/vineyards. Although Fredericksburg and Bell Mountain are their own AVAs, most wineries use Texas Hill Country on their wine labels since producers maintain the Texas Hill Country appellation is more recognizable and appreciated by consumers.

== See also ==
- Texas wine
