= Black Spanish (grape) =

Variety of grape

Black Spanish is a variation of grape that was originally assumed to be a seedling of an American hybrid grape which resulted from the crossing of the American Vitis aestivalis species with that of an unknown Vitis vinifera. The vinifera is suspected to have been the pollen donor.

Microsatellite DNA analysis (a.k.a. Simple Sequence Repeats or SSRs) has revealed that the American wild grapevine parent of Black Spanish (a.k.a. Jacquez) is Vitis berlandieri and not Vitis aestivalis. This hybridization is not known to have been purposeful and may have occurred naturally, as was the case with many of the early American grape cultivars. Riaz et al. (2019) have now published the genetic profile of the Jacquez grapevine as follows (percentages): V. vinifera: 69% V. berlandieri: 21% V. rupestris: 7% V. riparia: 3%.

Additional microsatellite DNA analyses was conducted on various 'Jacquez cultivars' by Dr. Jerry Rodrigues. They showed that at least two of the European accessions (grapevine collections), which are now curated in Europe, were originally derived from the oldest known Jacquez cultivar (the Madeira Jacquez). The original American hybrid grape parent had found its way to the Madeira Islands sometime in the 18th century (where it was called Jaqué or Jacquet) and then to France. Lenoir is another seedling similar to Black Spanish which was grown and used in wine by Nicholas Herbemont of Columbia, South Carolina.

Many other historical names have appeared throughout the early history of these Jacquez seedlings, such as Jack, Blue French, Ohio, and El Paso, among others. For example, Herbemont allegedly received Lenoir seeds from a man named Lenoir who cultivated them near Stateburg, South Carolina, in the vicinity of the Santee River sometime in the 18th century. Lenoir had made its way to Texas, where it took on the names El Paso and Black Spanish. From its wild South Carolina parent (likely, V. rupestris), Lenoir (and also Black Spanish) carries natural resistance to the Phylloxera pest, as well as to Pierce's Disease, which is a common threat to Vitis vinifera vineyards in warm winter areas of the United States. Black Spanish inherited its known tolerance to the deadly Pierce's Disease (PD) from its Vitis berlandieri parentage. Lenoir was also one of the American vines which the grape breeder Thomas Volney Munson experimented with in the late 19th century in Denison, Texas.

Prior to its use by Munson, Lenoir was grown and used in wine by Nicholas Herbemont, although to a lesser extent than the similar, lighter-skinned variety "Warren" ("Brown French") which became known as Herbemont because of his promotion of that variety. Lenoir was introduced to Europe in the mid-19th century, where French vintners were intrigued by its similarity to European Vitis vinifera grapes and gave it the names Jacquez (or Jacquet). It became an important direct producing grape in Europe during the phylloxera crisis and later was used to some extent as a rootstock to protect the classic vinifera grapes from phylloxera. Ulysses P. Hedrick's famous "Grapes of New York" in 1908 provides the seminal discussion of Lenoir and many of the early North American grapes.

== Modern use ==
Today, Lenoir is gaining favor among vineyards and wineries in the Texas Hill Country, the Rio Grande Valley, and in North Texas where Pierce's Disease is a constant worry with vinifera grapes. A more disease-resistant, black-skinned, red-wine hybrid of Lenoir crossed with Herbemont called "Favorite" was bred by John Niederauer of Brenham, Texas, and introduced circa 1938 (Brooks & Olmo 3rd, 1997). As growers in Texas realize the risk and expense associated with growing vinifera grapes in a hostile environment, Lenoir and Favorite are gaining greater acceptance.

Lenoir has been used for years in Texas port-style wines and as a blending varietal for its earthy aroma and dark color. Now more wineries are starting to use it in single-variety dry wines. Its taste has been described as completely different from European varieties, yet without the Concord-like notes of other old-line American hybrid grape varieties bred as table grapes from the wild Vitis labrusca grape. Also, the taste of Lenoir wine is said to improve when the bottle is left uncorked or strongly aerated by decanting, which suggests that reducing compounds are common in wines from the variety. Like the Virginia Vitis aestivalis hybrid Norton, Lenoir is gaining favor among wine enthusiasts who are looking for new tastes and locally sourced American products.

== See also ==
- Norton
- Vitis aestivalis
- Blanc du Bois
- Texas wine
