= Champanel (grape) =

Variety of grape

The Champanel grape is an American hybrid developed by Thomas Volney Munson of Texas. Champanel is a cross of the two grape varieties Vitis champinii X Worden, a Concord seedling. It grows vigorously, is resistant to root rot, Pierces disease and produces clusters of fruit resistant to rot and mildew. Although well adapted to a wide range of growing conditions, Champanel produces fruit with aroma characteristic of its Concord parentage and is not often seen commercially. Rather, Champanel is most often used as grafting material for Vitis vinifera (wine grapes), to provide disease resistant root stock. Jim Kamas writes, "Although the cause of vine death from [Pierce disease] was not known to him, T.V. Munson realized that utilizing grape parents that survived local conditions was important in creating new, improved adapted grape varieties" (Power). Munson not only developed a hybrid grape that is resistant to Pierce disease but that grows well in any soil type. The Champanel grapevine grows vigorously on any type of trellis it is placed under. The vine can be placed beside a fence so that the arms of the vine can run along it. Even though the vine grows vigorously, the Champanel grapevine is great for first time growers who want to add grapevines to their garden for the berries or for aesthetics. With the berries a grower can make jelly, juice or wine. This vine is excellent for growing up an arbor to provide shade in a growers back or front yard.

== Disease resistance and Tolerances ==
The clusters are loose, so plenty of air can blow between the berries to dry them from the morning dew or from a heavy rain. The loose bunches help to prevent Bunch rot, Powdery mildew and Downy mildew. Champanel grapes are also not susceptible to Pierce’s disease, which is a disease caused by the glassy-winged sharpshooter. This insect is native to southeast United States. The sharpshooter has the "ability to spread Xylella fsatidoisa, the bacterium that causes Pierce’s disease" (Power 148). The Champanel grapevine can thrive in the hot humid south and can tolerate temperatures 15 to 20 degrees below zero (Munson). This vine has a good resistance to disease and because of its ability to grow in any soil type the Champanel vine is an excellent choice for graft wood.

== Vine growth: Foliage, Cane and Arms ==
The Champanel grapevine grows vigorously starting from early spring to later summer in to early fall, so there is no need to fertilize them more than twice. These two applications should be given when the foliage starts to grow and when the berries are about pea size. However, if the grapes are growing in rich soil one application may suffice. The leaves are large and comparatively rough, so insects are not as interested in them. The cane grows upright on the trellis with the arms extending out as far as they are allowed to grow. With these vines pruning is important if the grower’s desire is to maximize fruit production and quality.

== Description of Berries ==
Berries are large and black and hang in small clusters which resemble the Concord grape. Unlike the thick tough skin of the Concord grape, the Champanel grape has thin tough skin (Munson). The thin skin along with its tender pulp allows the Champanel grape to be an excellent table grape.

== Ripening ==
In mid spring white blooms appear on the vine and in midsummer about the same time as the Concord grape ripens the Champanel grape ripens. However, the Champanel will not have the early dropping of fruit or the uneven ripening as the Concord grapes do. The uneven ripening is not a small problem because grapes do not ripen after they are picked from the vine. The early ripen is also significant because the berry moth can be problematic especially for late season grapes. The adult moth lays eggs on the fruit or near the fruit; when the larvae hatch they are of course worm-like. They bore their way into the fruit and eat from berry to berry. These insects have generally three generations a growing season, but in the south and west they can have four (Teixeira). However, the Champanel grapes will only face at the most one to two generations that can be managed with pheromone traps.
