= Vitis × champinii =

Scientific classification
- Kingdom: Plantae
- Clade: Tracheophytes
- Clade: Angiosperms
- Clade: Eudicots
- Clade: Rosids
- Order: Vitales
- Family: Vitaceae
- Genus: Vitis
- Species: V. × champinii

Binomial name
- Vitis × champinii Planch.

Variety of grape

Vitis × champinii, or Champin's grape, is a hybrid grape resulting from the natural hybridization of Vitis mustangensis with Vitis rupestris. Its native range is the Edwards Plateau in Texas.
