= Llano Estacado Winery =

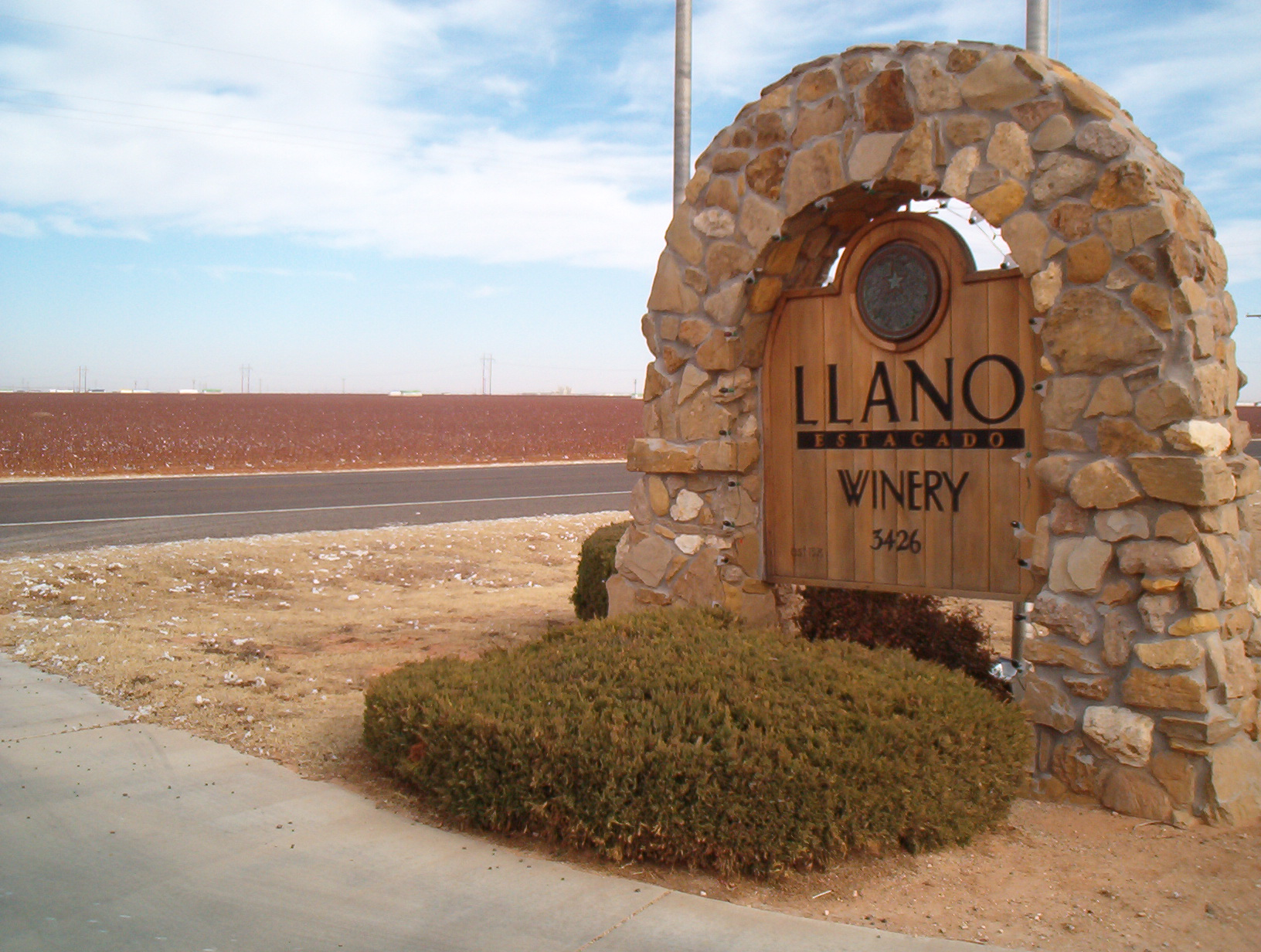
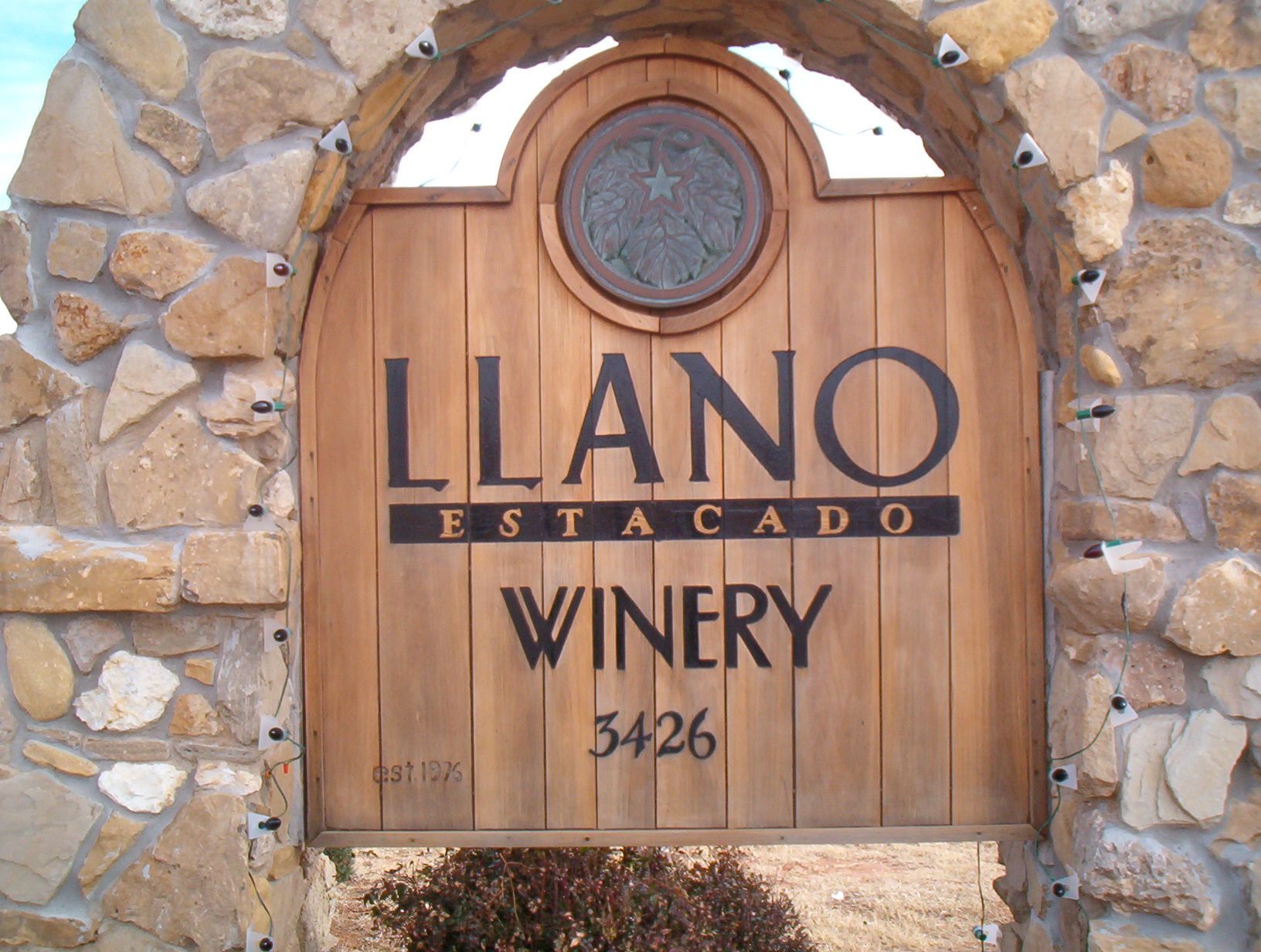
Sign at the winery's entrance

Llano Estacado Winery is a winery located in Lubbock, Texas. It is one of the oldest wineries in Texas.

== History ==
In 1976, Llano Estacado Winery was established in southeast Lubbock County, Texas, while it was still a dry county. The state legislature passed a bill two years later permitting wine production in dry counties. The winery planted its first vineyard in 1978.
