= Thomas Volney Munson =

American horticulturist and breeder of grapes

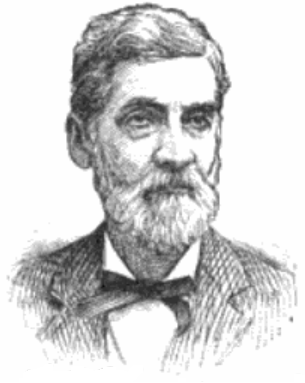
- Born: September 26, 1843; Astoria, Illinois
- Died: January 21, 1913 (aged 69); Denison, Texas
- Education: University of Kentucky
- Occupation: Horticulturist

Thomas Volney Munson (September 26, 1843 – January 21, 1913), often referred to simply as T.V. Munson, was an American horticulturist and breeder of grapes in Texas. In 1888, Munson was the second American, after Thomas Edison, to be named a Chevalier du Mérite Agricole by the French government.

== Background ==
Thomas Volney Munson was born in Astoria, Illinois. He was a son of William Munson (1808–1890) and Maria (Linley) Munson (1810–1890). Munson was an 1870 graduate of the University of Kentucky. Shortly after completing his education, he married and moved to the vicinity of Lincoln, Nebraska. In 1873 he became interested in improving the various species of grapes native to the United States and performed systematic work developing new varieties by cross-pollination and hybridization. His experiments failed because of climatic rigors and a visitation of the Rocky Mountain locusts. Undismayed, in April 1876 Munson moved to Denison, Texas, where two of his brothers had already relocated.

While primarily remembered as horticulturist, Munson was interested in a variety of fields. He is credited with several inventions, including a primitive helicopter. He became recognized as a botanist as well as a viticulturist. He wrote Native Trees of the Southwest under the direction of the United States Department of Agriculture and submitted a similar thesis in 1883 to satisfy requirements for the master's degree at the Kentucky Agricultural College. Munson died on January 21, 1913 in Denison.

== Career ==
Munson made extensive use of American native grape species, and devoted a great deal of his life to collecting and documenting them. He released hundreds of named cultivars, but his work identifying American native grape (especially those from Texas) is of great significance today for their use in rootstock. Though breeding for wine quality seems to have occupied a great proportion of his effort, his work on rootstock development had the greatest impact on viticulture. This work provided European grape growers with phylloxera-resistant rootstocks, allowing them to recover from the devastating epidemic of the late 19th century while still growing the ancient Vitis vinifera cultivars. These rootstocks are still used worldwide. In honor of this work, the French government named him Chevalier du Merite Agricole, and Cognac, France, became a sister city to Munson's home of Denison.

The rootstocks that Munson recommended to the French were Texas native Vitis Berlandieri, cinerea and cordifolia (vulpina) grapes that were found in the central Texas hill country at Dog Ridge in Bell County near Temple, Texas. These wild grapes can still be found there. Munson specified these Texas native grapes because soils in this location closely match the limestone soils in French vineyards and these grapes were highly tolerant of high pH limestone soils. Later, Munson was also asked to advise on a Phylloxera-resistance rootstock for California vineyards, and through discussions with Luther Burbank he recommended Vitis rupestris.

In the 1880s, Munson worked on a monograph on native grapes that was to be illustrated by William Henry Prestele, the first artist appointed to the staff of the recently formed Pomological Division of the United States Department of Agriculture in Washington, D.C. Munson sent live and dried specimens to Prestele, who made color sketches of details that Munson would then review; Prestele would then use these detail drawings to create life-size paintings. The U.S. Secretary of Agriculture eventually decided the cost of printing the monograph with the illustrations would be prohibitive, so it was never published in its intended form. However, Munson went on to use the text he wrote as the foundation for his 1909 book Foundations of American Grape Culture, regarded as one of the founding texts of American grape breeding and widely referenced even today. Instead of Prestele's watercolors, it was illustrated with photographs. Grape breeder Elmer Swenson credited it with inspiring his early interest in the field.

== Freethought activity ==
Although Munson is best remembered as a horticulturist, he was also active in the Freethought movement. In July 1890, when James D. Shaw, the controversial editor of the Independent Pulpit was elected president of the newly formed Texas Liberal Association at a meeting held in Waco, Texas, members chose Munson to serve as treasurer, a post to which he was re-elected the following year in San Antonio, Texas. Munson also subscribed to infidel newspapers such as the Blue-grass Blade and occasionally lectured at Freethinker meetings. When he died in 1913, his funeral was held in a public hall instead of a church and the services, which were "simple and brief," consisted largely of a funeral oration composed by the deceased himself "when still in good health." He was afterward buried in Denison's Fairview Cemetery.

== Legacy ==
The West Campus of Grayson County College in Denison, Texas, preserves much of Munson's work. In 1974, the T.V. Munson Memorial Vineyard was established that preserves many of his cultivars and produces stock for propagation. This was followed in 1988 with the opening of the T.V. Munson Viticulture and Enology Center that serves as a repository for documents and other historical materials regarding Munson. It also houses research, classroom and conference facilities. The grapes that Munson recommended for rootstocks for Phylloxera resistance in both Europe and California are still widely used worldwide.

The sports arena at Denison High School is named Munson Stadium.

== See also ==
- List of wine personalities
- George Engelmann, another phylloxera consultant and grape expert
