= Bell Mountain AVA =

American Viticultural Area located in central Texas

Coordinates: 30°18′54″N 98°55′28″W

Bell Mountain
- Wine region
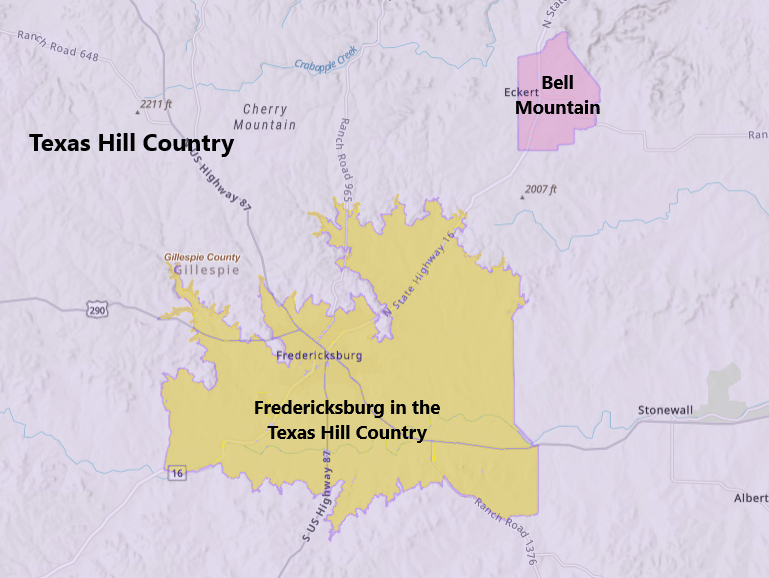
- Type: American Viticultural Area
- Year established: 1986
- Country: United States
- Part of: Texas, Texas Hill Country AVA
- Other regions in Texas, Texas Hill Country AVA: Fredericksburg in the Texas Hill Country AVA
- Growing season: 180 days
- Climate region: Region II-III
- Heat units: 2743.5-3519.5 GDD
- Precipitation (annual average): 17.48 in (444 mm)
- Soil conditions: decomposed granite, non-calcareous, sandy loam soils, with light sandy clay subsoil
- Total area: 3,200 acres (5 sq mi)
- Size of planted vineyards: 43.5 acres (17.6 ha)
- No. of vineyards: 4 (as of 2018)
- Grapes produced: Cabernet Sauvignon, Chardonnay, Malbec, Merlot, Pinot Noir, Riesling, Syrah, Viognier
- No. of wineries: 0 (as of 2025)
- Wine produced: Cabernet Sauvignon, Chardonnay, Merlot, Pinot Noir, Riesling

Bell Mountain is an American Viticultural Area (AVA) located in Gillespie County, Central Texas along the southern and southwestern slopes of Bell Mountain, about 15 miles (24 km) north of Fredericksburg. The diminutive 3,200-acre (5 sq mi) appellation was established as the nation's 88^{th} and the states' second AVA on October 16, 1986 by the Bureau of Alcohol, Tobacco and Firearms (ATF) after reviewing the petition submitted by Robert P. Oberhelman on behalf of local vintners, proposing the first viticultural area entirely within Texas' borders named "Bell Mountain.".
In 1991, the viticultural area became a sub-appellation set entirely within the 9.6-million-acre (15,000 sq mi) Texas Hill Country. At the outset, Bell Mountain contained of two vineyards with a sole operating bonded winery. The last winery in the AVA, Bell Mountain Vineyards, had closed by 2025.

The AVA is on the northern rim of the Edwards Plateau, and north of its peak is a region referred to as the "Llano Uplift". Bell Mountain, which at 1,956 feet (596 m) is the highest elevation in the locale, was first given this name by early settlers of the area in the mid and late nineteenth century. The peak was identified by this name on the U.S. Geological Survey map, the first such map published on the general area, in 1885. This identity has been established by the fact that it is the highest elevation of the area, and this dominance has made it a landmark. The boundaries of the "Bell Mountain" viticultural area are delineated in the U.S.G.S. "Willow City Quadrangle" map.

== Terroir ==
=== Topography, Climate and Soil ===
To the north and northeast, the AVA is distinguished by the steepness of the mountain slopes outside the boundaries of the area. The topography is shaped and influenced by the tributaries of the Colorado River, with the Llano and Pedernales Rivers playing a crucial role. The landscape is heavily dictated by the rivers and collection of tributaries, determining how water flows through the region. These elements actively mold the environment by modifying soil composition and the various microclimates.
Further, soil conditions outside the area preclude viticulture on those other slopes of Bell Mountain. The petition states: "The granite protrudes through the ground surface profusely on the Peak's northern slope, therefore making tillage impossible. For this reason, only the slopes to the south and southwest are included in the boundary of the proposed Viticultural area." In other directions, the viticultural area is distinguished by soil types and by the topographical limits of the slopes of Bell Mountain. With respect to soil, the petition states as follows:

The soils within the boundaries of the proposed Viticultural Area are identified on the map as "PP-Pedernales-Pontotoc Association". The description reads "non-calcareous, sandy, loam soils, with light sandy clay subsoil, Udic Palenstalfs; Typic Rhodustaifs". These soils are unique in the general area referred to as the "Hill Country" or the Edwards Plateau in that they are slightly acid, whereas most of the soils are calcareous, or lime-bearing.

In support of this statement, the petitioner submitted a copy of a soil-map from the book, Eastern Hill Country Resource Conservation & Development Project, published by the U.S. Department of Agriculture (USDA) in 1968. The map illustrates that the viticultural area boundaries correspond approximately to the limits of the area with soils of the Pedernales-Pontotoc Association. This is the only occurrence of these soils shown anywhere on that map and described as "underlaid with sandstone, and below the sandstone is granite." In addition, the petition states that "The area is drier than the Pedernales valley to its south and the Llano valley to its north. It is also cooler due to its elevation, and constant breezes." The USDA plant hardiness zone is 8b.

== Viticulture ==
Cabernet Sauvignon primarily thrives in Texas vineyards as the leading red grape variety according to a 2020 USDA Grape Varieties Survey. Chateau Wright's vines thrive out of the volcanic clay at 5,400 feet (1,600 m). Bell Mountain vintners focus on grape varieties best suited to their terroir, i.e., Cabernet Sauvignon, Merlot, and Malbec. The aromatic reds produced are characterized by the interaction of fruit, tannins, and crisp acidity. Further experimentation has included plantings of Syrah, Viognier and Riesling.

== See also ==
- Château Wright
- Texas wine
