= Fredericksburg in the Texas Hill Country AVA =

American Viticultural Area located in central Texas

Coordinates: 30°16′43″N 98°52′30″W

Fredericksburg in the Texas Hill Country
- Wine region
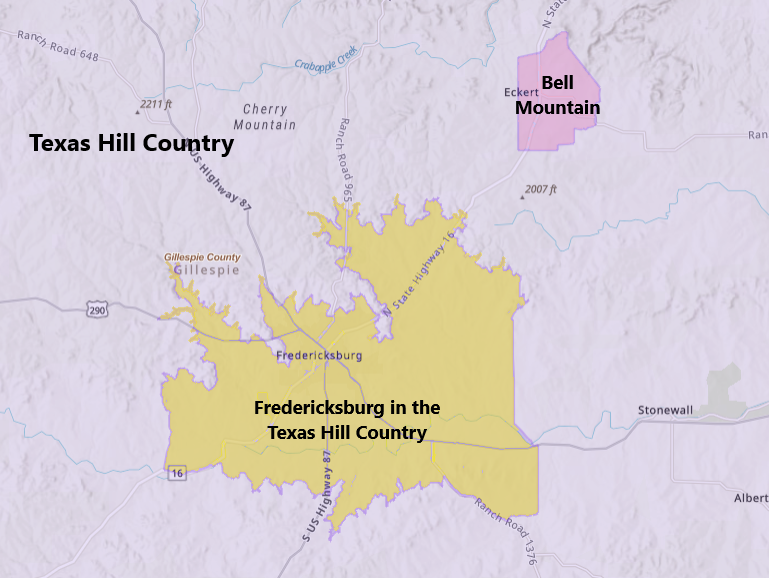
- Type: American Viticultural Area
- Year established: 1988
- Country: United States
- Part of: Texas, Texas Hill Country AVA
- Other regions in Texas, Texas Hill Country AVA: Bell Mountain AVA
- Growing season: 219 days
- Climate region: Region II
- Heat units: 2873.3 GDD
- Precipitation (annual average): 27.44 in (697 mm)
- Soil conditions: sandy loam topsoil (mostly quartz) over nutrient rich reddish clay
- Total area: 70,400 acres (110 sq mi)
- Size of planted vineyards: 5,000+ acres (2,000+ ha)
- No. of vineyards: 25+
- Grapes produced: Cabernet Sauvignon, Chardonnay, Chenin Blanc, Cinsault, Malbec, Marsanne, Merlot, Montepulciano, Petit Sirah, Roussanne, Sangiovese, Sauvignon Blanc, Syrah, Tannat, Tempranillo, Viognier
- No. of wineries: 75+

Fredericksburg in the Texas Hill Country is an American Viticultural Area (AVA) located in central Texas surrounding the town of Fredericksburg. The 70,400-acre (110 sq mi) appellation was established as the nation's 103^{th} and Texas' third AVA on December 22, 1988 by the Bureau of Alcohol, Tobacco and Firearms (ATF), Treasury after reviewing the petition submitted by Mr. Karl W. Koch of the Pedernales Vineyard, on behalf of local vintners, proposing a viticultural area in Gillespie County, Texas, to be known as "Fredericksburg in the Texas Hill County."
The viticultural area lies entirely in Gillespie County and equidistant approximately 80 miles (130 km) west of Austin and northwest from San Antonio. At the outset, there were approximately eight vineyards cultivating 50 acres (20 ha) of wine grapes. Additionally, there were many commercial peach growers in the area with experimental vineyards.
The name "Fredericksburg" can be found on several U.S.G.S. maps of the area surrounding the city of Fredericksburg. The area around Fredericksburg is described in various newspaper and magazine articles, as well as brochures published by the State of Texas, as the "Texas Hill Country." Therefore, "Fredericksburg in the Texas Hill Country" was approved as the name for this viticultural area.

== History ==
Wine has been made in Texas for centuries and within the Texas Hill Country on a small scale "for the better part of 150 years." No alcoholic beverage made from grapes appears to have been produced before the arrival of Europeans in the sixteenth century. Instead, the indigenous peoples of Meso-America made such alcoholic drinks as pulque, the forerunner of mescal, from the maguey or agave plant; tesgüino from the sprouted kernels of maize; and balché from mead, flavored from the leaves of the Lonchocarpus, a tropical tree or climbing shrub with colorful flowers.

Fredericksburg was founded May 5, 1846, by German immigrants under the auspices of the Society for the Protection of German Immigrants in Texas. The first colonization was of New Braunfels in 1845. A few years later, Fort Martin Scott was established southeast of Fredericksburg. The Commissioner General of the Society, also known as the "Adelsverein," was Baron Ottfried Hans Von Meusebach, a German nobleman who took the name of John O. Meusebach once settled in Fredericksburg. The city of Fredericksburg derived its name from the nobleman Prince Frederick of Prussia, who was the highest-ranking member of the "Adelsverein." This society sponsored the colonization of the Fisher-Miller Land Grant in Central Texas. Vineyards were confined during this time to a very small number of Germans in the eastern settlements. The few vineyards which were established often drew favorable comments from observers, who foresaw a great future for this agricultural specialty. More common was the practice of making wine from wild grapes, principally the variety known as the Mustang, which was found in abundance in the valleys of the Colorado, San Antonio, and Guadalupe Rivers and their tributaries. The abundance of wild grapes convinced the early settlers that domesticated types would also thrive, and vine clippings brought from Europe were planted by Germans in the very first year at New Braunfels and shortly thereafter around Castroville. Experiments continued for a number of years in the western settlements, including the hill on the north side of Fredericksburg, but in the end it was realized that the imported European vines would not grow properly in Texas, and viticulture was, with few exceptions, abandoned. A commercial winery existed as late as the post-World War II period in Fredericksburg, selling products made from wild grapes and berries, but the wine was made primarily for home use to satisfy a cultural beverage preference. Modern technology made viticulture a more practical venture than a century or so ago. Consequently, Fredericksburg area viticulture showed promise of producing a unique wine that paralleled and/or supplemented the peach business for which Fredericksburg has long been renown.

== Terroir ==
=== Topography ===
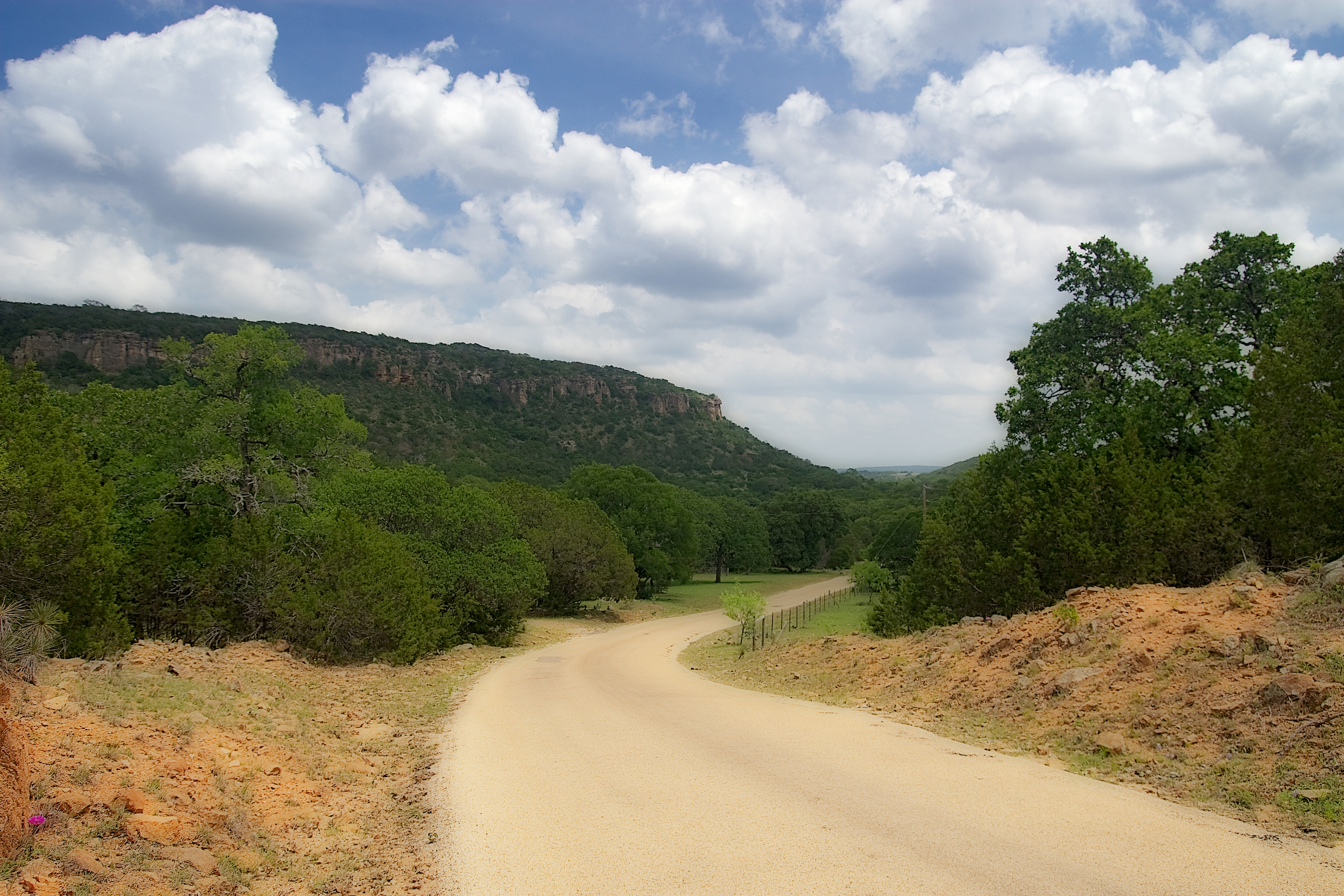

The Fredericksburg in the Texas Hill Country viticultural area is on the Edwards Plateau which is the result of the geological uplift phenomenon. The Pedernales watershed originates due west of Fredericksburg a few miles from the Gillespie-Kerr-Kimble county line at an elevation of 2,200 feet (670 m). The Pedernales River flows easterly to Lake Travis (below 700 feet (210 m) elevation) which is a part of the Austin city water supply. The elevation of the viticultural area is between 1,500 and 1,900 feet (460 and 580 m). At an attitude above 1,900 feet (580 m), there is a greatly increased risk of spring frost. The viticultural area is a 110-square-mile (70,000-acre) "bowl" shaped landform that ranges from 1,500 to 1,900 feet (460–580 m) in elevation with a relatively flat bottom and relatively steep sides. It is the bottom of the bowl that is suitable for farming. There is no similar farming area for at least 100 miles (160 km) from Austin and San Antonio. Most of the surrounding area is ranching, not crops and orchards. The majority of the area, including the town of Fredericksburg, lies to the north of the Pedernales River.

=== Soil ===
The soils of the viticultural area consist of the contiguous Luckenbach-Pedernales-Heatly Soil Association which is on or near the Pedernales River and its tributaries at an approximate elevation of between 1,500 and 1,900 feet (460 and 580 m). These soils adjacent to the river, and the riverbed itself, near Fredericksburg contain an abundance of flint or chert which is hydrated silica from the ancient seabed that formed the Edwards Plateau. The Spanish word "Pedernale" (pe̞ðe̞ɾˈnal), from which the river derived its name, actually means "flintstone." The higher elevations of the Pedernales River watershed are the source of the Alluvial Valley Soils of the viticultural area. The Luckenbach-Pedernales-Heatly Soil Association is composed of deep, sandy to loamy, gently sloping soils on uplands and terraces. The Soil Conservation Service, U.S. Department of Agriculture, describes the Luckenbach-Pedernales-Heatly Soil Association as a sandy loam topsoil (mostly quartz with limited organic matter) over a reddish clay. This clay is high in the nutrients, phosphorus, potassium, and calcium, as well as other minerals. The red color is due to iron which helps peaches (and grapes) avoid a chloritic condition. About one-half of this Soil Association in Gillespie County is cultivated. The crops are sorghums, small grain, peaches, grapes, and tame pasture. The remaining one-half is used for range land and wildlife habitat. The goal of finding suitable areas within the Fredericksburg AVA for producing high-quality grapes has been met. A Land Suitability Analysis of Fredericksburg AVA done by the University of Arizona produced a weighted overlay model found 594 acres (240 ha) (27%) to be highly suitable, 1,158 acres (469 ha) (53%) to be moderately suitable, and 430 acres (170 ha) (20%) not suitable for viticulture. Areas deemed highly suitable or moderately suitable should allow growers to produce to high-quality grapes.

=== Climate ===
The Fredericksburg area, at latitude 30 degrees north, is far enough south to escape harsh winters. At an elevation of 1,747 ft (532 m) and a distance of more than 200 miles (320 km) inland from the Gulf Coast, the Fredericksburg area escapes the hot, humid summers characteristic of many southern climates. Summer temperatures are more characteristic of the High Plains than of southern Texas. Smog is unknown, and severe storms are very rare. Total annual precipitation averages 27.44 in (697 mm). The lack of rainfall is due to the distance north and west of the Gulf of Mexico. A result of the dry climate is an abundance of sunshine which is a requirement for quality fruit. The dry climate also reduces disease problems. The Fredericksburg area is generally cooler than surrounding areas. Summer nights at Fredericksburg average 4 to 5 °F (−16 to −15 °C) cooler than at lower elevations east of the Hill Country. The growing season (freeze-free period) in the Fredericksburg area averages 219 days. The average date of the last occurrence of 32 degrees in spring and the first occurrence in fall are April 1 and November 6, respectively. The altitude of the area serves two purposes. In winter there are over 850 hours per year at below 40 °F (4 °C). This maintains a proper winter dormancy factor. A second altitude benefit is that of temperature change between night and day. A difference in temperature is required to properly mature a fruit. Because of the higher elevation of the Fredericksburg area, the temperature difference between night and day is more pronounced than in surrounding areas. Weather maps published by the Bureau of Business Research at the University of Texas show that the viticultural area is located at or near departure or change points from surrounding areas for temperature, precipitation and relative humidity. The Fredericksburg area is generally cooler than areas to the north and east while about the same mean annual temperature as areas to the immediate south and west. The mean annual precipitation for the viticultural area is about the same as the area to the north, more than the area to the west, and less than the areas to the east and south. The mean annual relative humidity for the Fredericksburg area is about the same as the areas to the north and south, lower than the area to the east, and higher than the area to the west. The plant hardiness zone is 8b.

Mendelbaum Cellars Winery

== Viticulture ==
Fredericksburg and the surrounding area were settled by German immigrants in the nineteenth century. These settlers were the first to successfully cultivate grapevines in the Hill Country region harvesting the native Mustang grape to produce wines. The appellation is over 200 miles (322 km) from the Gulf of Mexico, and feels little effect from the hot, humid, coastal winds. The Hill Country region is resident to over 100 wineries and vineyards with Fredericksburg the epicenter of Texas Wine Country and the state's premier enotourism destination. Its wineries have been producing award-winning vintages earning international recognition. Wine Road 290 is the "wine trail" on U.S. Highway 290 that routes through the heart of the viticultural area accessible to many of Fredericksburg's wineries/vineyards generally located within a 30-minute radius from downtown. Fredericksburg's Urban Wine Trail includes over 10 downtown wine tasting rooms within walking distance to historic locations, shops and boutiques from one of the many bed-and-breakfasts or hotels. Although Fredericksburg is its own AVA, most local wineries use "Texas Hill Country" on their wine labels since producers maintain the Texas Hill Country appellation is more recognizable and appreciated by consumers.
