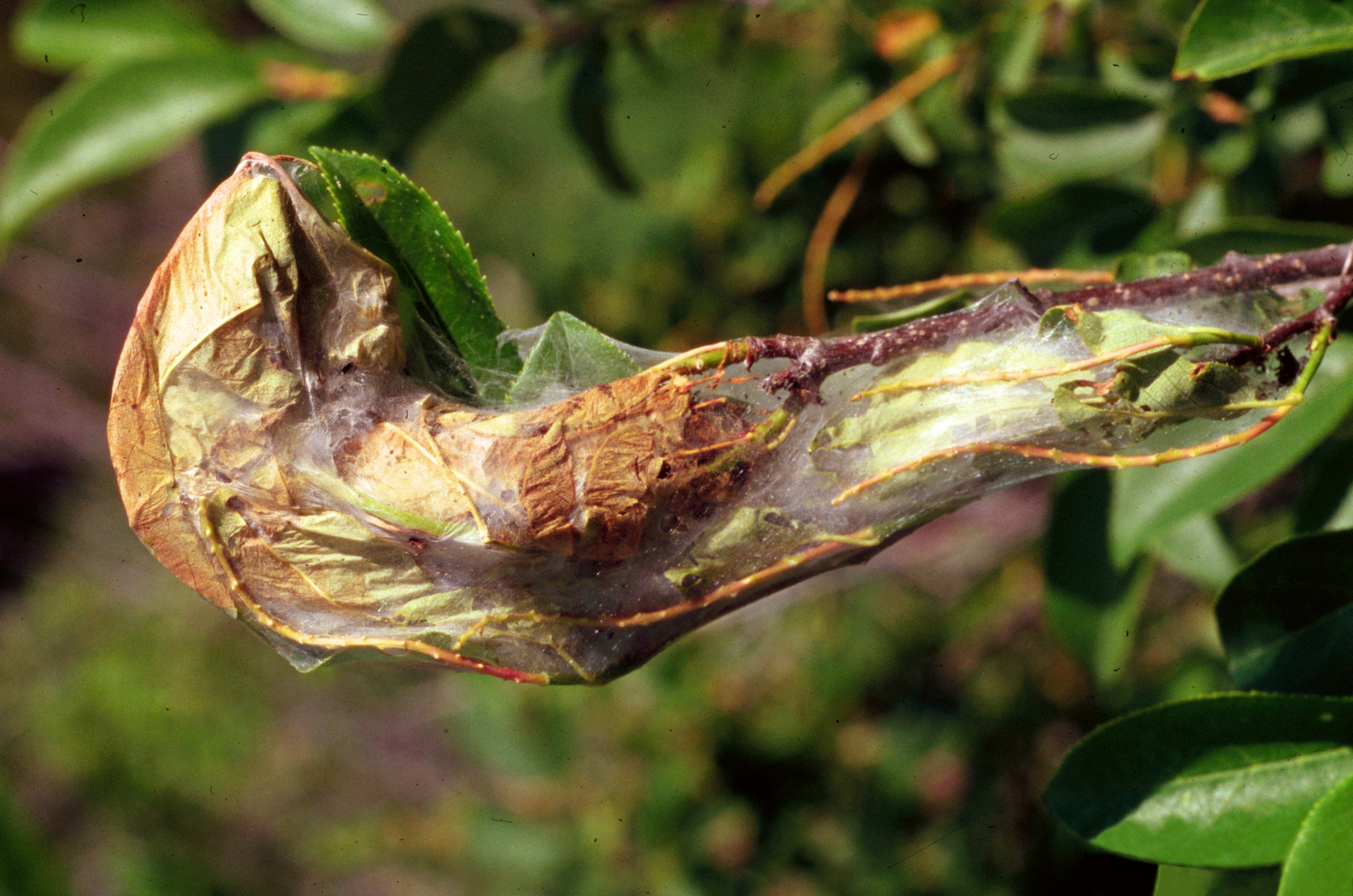
- Ugly-nest caterpillar tent

Scientific classification
- Kingdom: Animalia
- Phylum: Arthropoda
- Clade: Pancrustacea
- Class: Insecta
- Order: Lepidoptera
- Family: Tortricidae
- Genus: Archips
- Species: A. cerasivorana

Binomial name
- Archips cerasivorana (Fitch, 1856)

Synonyms
- Lozotaenia cerasivorana Fitch, 1856

= Archips cerasivorana =

Ugly-nest caterpillar moth

Species of moth

Archips cerasivorana, the ugly-nest caterpillar moth, is a species of moth of the family Tortricidae. The caterpillars of this species are known to create nests by tying the leaves of their host plant together. Caterpillars are seen to follow one another in trails, a behavior prompted by the release of signaling pheromones from their spinnerets.

A. cerasivorana is found throughout North America, as far north as Alaska and as far south as North Carolina. The wingspan is 20–25 mm. Adults can be found from July to September in one generation per year.

== Taxonomy ==
A. cerasivorana is commonly referred to as the ugly-nest caterpillar moth. It is a species of moth in the family Tortricidae. Related species include Archips fervidana. Archips rileyana is very similar to A. cerasivorana, both in appearance and larval habits. At first, A. rileyana was considered a subspecies of A. cerasivorana, but Obraztsov (1959) demonstrated that both adults and larvae of the two species can be separated.

A. cerasivorana is characterized by an uncus with parallel sides in the male, a large blunt signum in the female, and smaller, sometimes body-colored pinncula on the larval abdomen. In contrast, A. rileyana is characterized by a spatulate uncus in the male, a moderate pointed signum in the female, and very large, conspicuous, black pinncula on the larval abdomen.

== Diet ==
The larvae feed on the leaves of Prunus virginiana, Prunus serotina, Crataegus, Rosa, Malus, Cotoneaster, Betula and Populus species.

== Distribution ==
It is found in various parts of North America, from Alaska to Canada and United States. Within the United States, it can be found towards the east in New England, the south in North Carolina, and the west in California, Utah, and Colorado.

== Morphology ==
=== Larval morphology ===
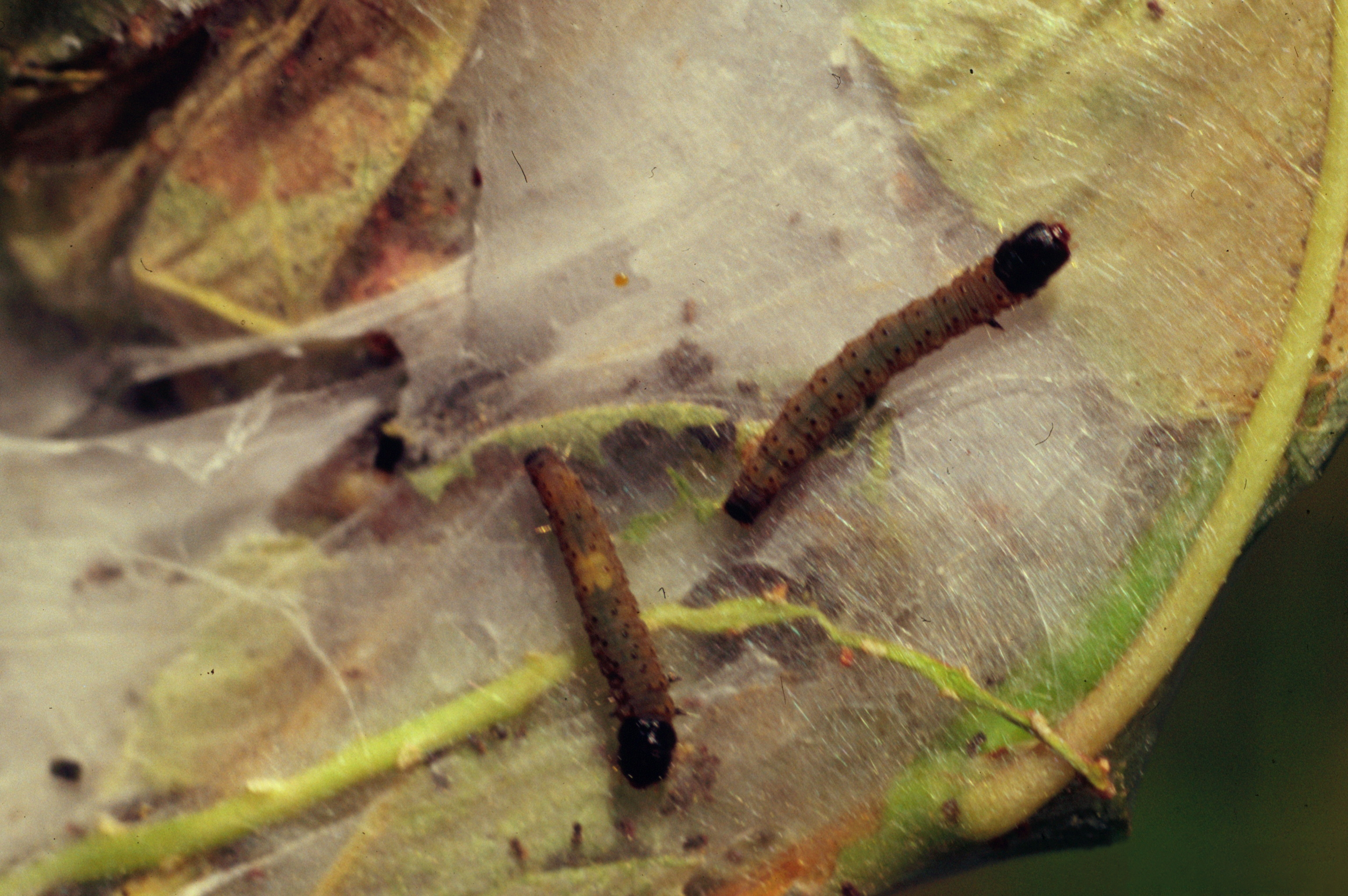
Larva

The larvae are distinct by their coloration. Early instars are yellowish-green with black legs, head, prothoracic shield, and anal shield. The later instars are bright orange with the same contrasting dark sclerotization and with sparse moderately long pale setae. Last instar larvae are 19–26 mm in length with a yellow to dark yellowish-green abdomen. The head, prothoracic shield, thoracic legs, and anal shield are dark brown to black. An anal comb is absent. Larvae of Archips rileyana are very similar to those of A. cerasivorana.

=== Adult morphology ===
In adult males, the forewing length ranges from 7.5-9.5 mm; and 9.0-12.0 mm in females. The adults are easily recognized by the orange forewing with many silvery bars. Forewing color varies from bright orange to yellow, often with faint purplish markings. Males have a forewing costal fold. There are distinct brown squared blotches along the costa in the postmedian and median area, along with variable smaller brown markings through the middle of the wing in the antemedian and median areas. The hindwings and most of the body is also orange. The wingspan is 20–25 mm. The hindwings are yellow with orange shading.

== Life cycle and behavior ==
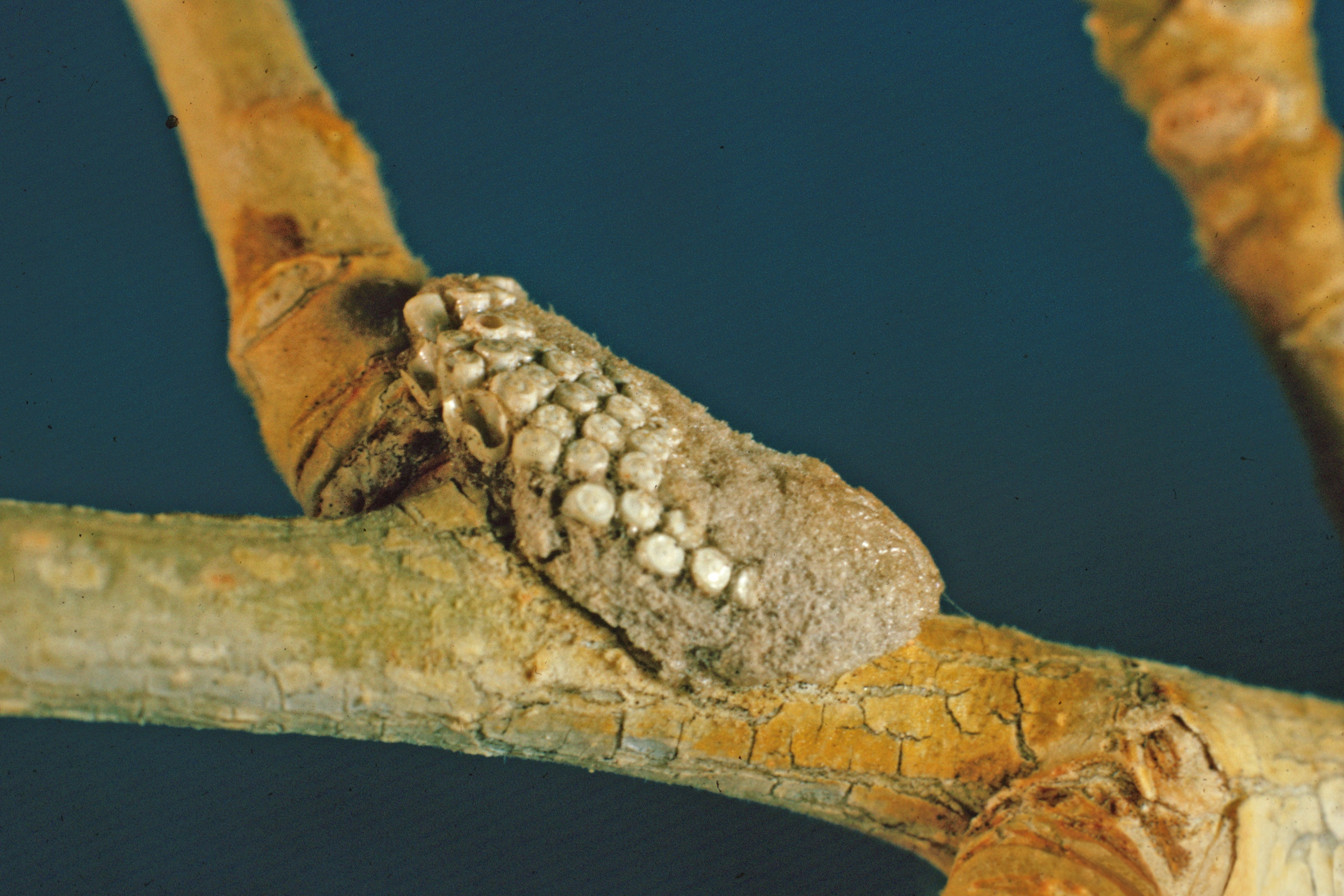
Eggs

There is one generation every year. Females lay masses of 25-200 eggs at the base of shoots, often near the ground. Females mainly prefer chokecherry. Eggs overwinter and first instar larvae hatch in May. Adults can be found from early July to mid-September. Unlike many tortricids, the larvae are social, and feeding occurs in silken nests on terminals of the host plants. The webs are made around the terminal shoots of the host, sometimes enveloping entire plants. Pupation occurs inside individual cells inside the shelter. Adults are not very active during the day and can be found resting on foliage. At night, the adults are known to be attracted to lights. A typical nest may contain 30-200 larvae and reach up to 30 inches in diameter. The nest is expanded when the colony needs additional food and feeding always occurs under the protection of the nest. Early stages skeletonize leaves while later stages consume entire leaves. Pupation occurs in chambers constructed in the nest from frass and silk. Before emerging, the pupae will force their way to the outer surface of the silk nest where the adult moth ecloses.

=== Building of tents ===
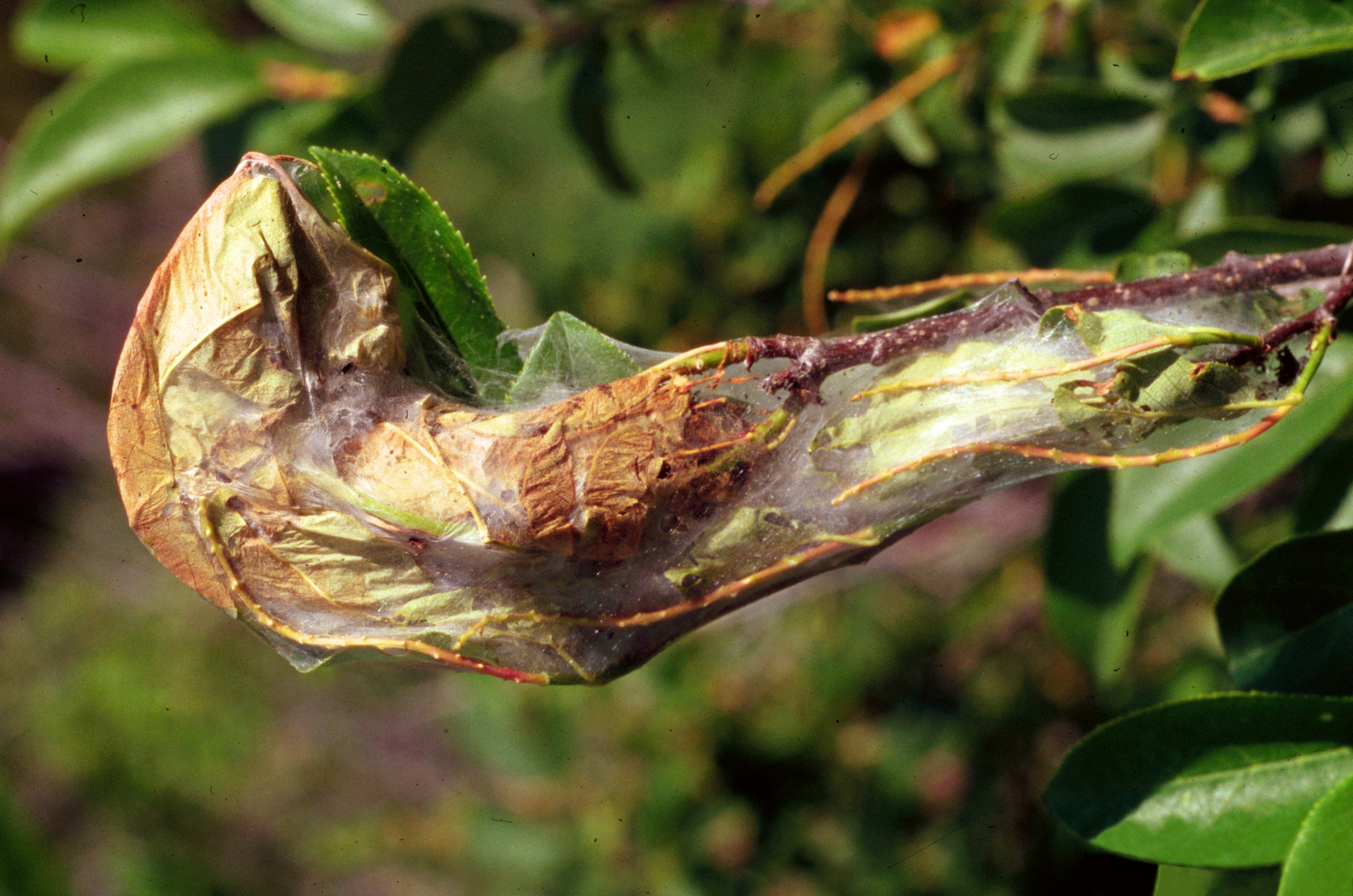
Tent

From the first instar, the caterpillars will aggregate and build large tent structures. These caterpillars are one of the few in the family Tortricidae that exhibit social behavior.

They make these tents by spinning silk threads between leaves and branches, which draws them into a compact nest. Each strand of silk is stretched slightly before it is attached to a leaf so that a tiny force (from axial retraction) will pull the leaf slightly towards the nest. When many strands of silk are spun to the surrounding leaves, the net forces will eventually drive all the leaves into the characteristic tent shape. The caterpillars usually stay within boundaries defined by the silk that envelops their shelter. They occasionally venture out of the nest, traveling only short distances to draw in new leaves. In most cases, the colony finds a sufficient number of leaves in its contiguous patch to complete larval development.

If all of the leaves within a tent are consumed before the caterpillars are ready to pupate, the caterpillars will be forced to leave their nest and find a new nesting location. During these migrations, the caterpillars will depart individually or in small groups, leaving small silken trails laced with pheromones to guide the next caterpillar.

=== Trail-marking and following ===
Trail-following has been hypothesized as a product of both chemical and physical input.

Research has shown that trail-following behavior in a caterpillar originates, in part, from the following of pheromones left by other caterpillars. Each caterpillar secrets marker pheromones secreted from glands by the spinnerets, no other regions of the body have been shown to secrete pheromones. Experiments have shown that caterpillars are capable of following trails prepared with gland extracts, but such trails were markedly less effective than originally-intact control trails. Also, caterpillars display a preference for silk-like trails. When presented with a variety of pheromone-trail mediums, from nonporous steel, to cotton, to the original trail, experimental caterpillars preferred the original silk trail.

== Interactions with humans ==
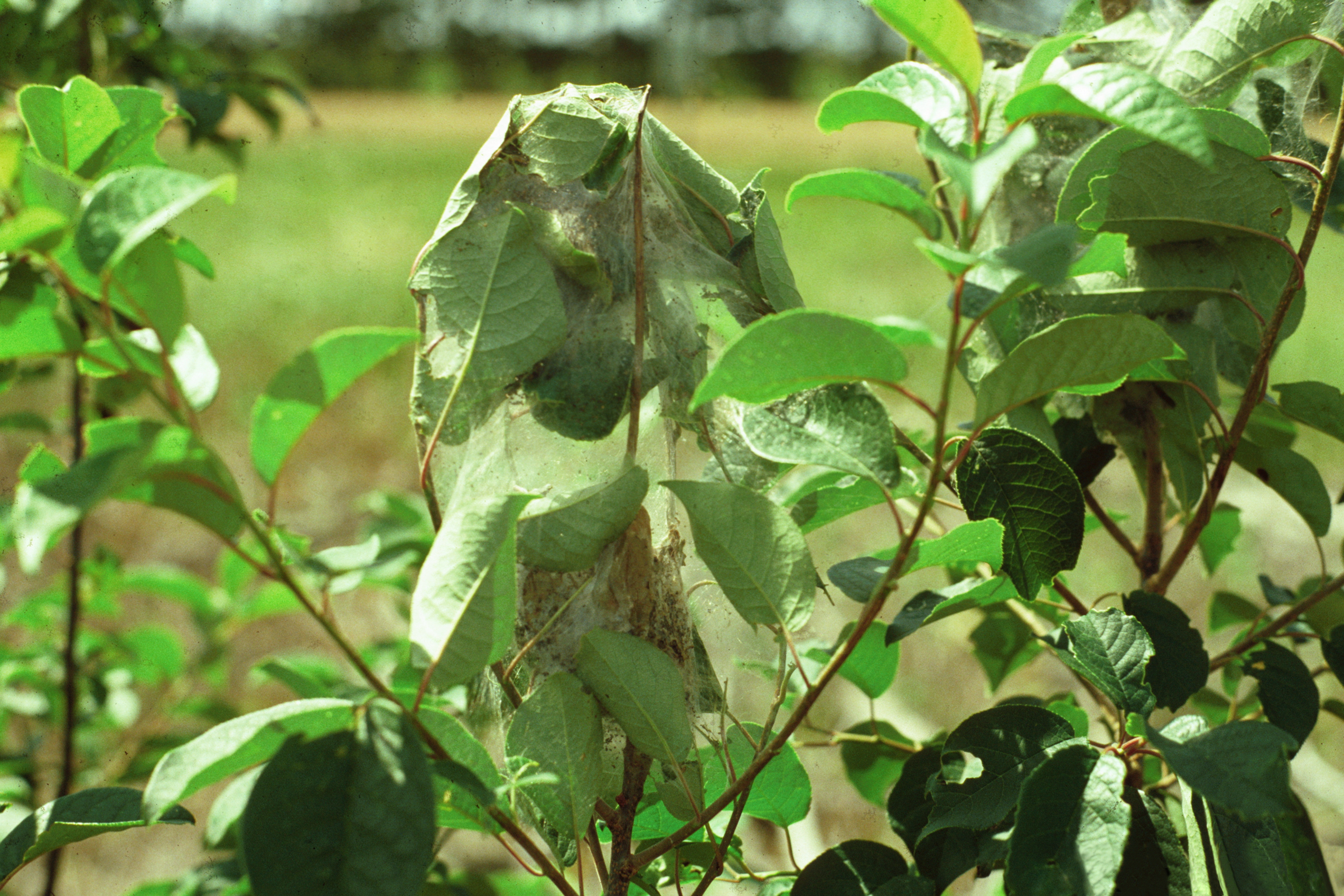
Damage

Ugly-nest caterpillars cause little permanent damage to plants besides branch deformity. They have little to no economic impact. The largest problem they pose is cosmetic. The caterpillars will sometimes build their unsightly nests in orchards and gardens. The caterpillars will web together foliage which they then feed, defecate, and pupate in. The nests can be easily located by visual inspection; they are found primarily on chokecherry, but can also be found on other hardwoods and shrubs. To monitor an orchard for presence of caterpillars, one should look for the development of untidy nests of webbing, twigs, and leaves.

=== Removal of caterpillars ===
The best means for removal is to prune and destroy webbed nests.

The caterpillars can also be chemically removed through use of pesticides. Pesticides like the bacteria Bacillus thuringiensis can be sprayed to control young larvae. Larger populations of older larvae can be controlled with a residual insecticide, but damage is rarely sufficient to warrant treatment that may endanger the rest of the local environment. Biorational pesticides like insecticidal soap, pyrethins, spinosad, and tebufenozide can also be used.
