= Stomoxyn =

Identifiers
- Symbol: Stomoxyn
- Pfam: PF11585
- InterPro: IPR021037
- OPM superfamily: 151
- OPM protein: 1zrv
Available protein structures:
- PDB: IPR021037 PF11585 (ECOD; PDBsum)
- AlphaFold: IPR021037; PF11585

Stomoxyn is an insect antimicrobial peptide localised in the gut epithelium, which functions in killing a range of microorganisms, parasites and some viruses. In water, stomoxyn has a flexible random coil in structure, while in trifluoroethanol it adopts a stable helical structure. Structural similarities to the antimicrobial peptide cecropin A from Hyalophora cecropia suggest that it may function in a similar manner by disrupting the bacterial membrane.
