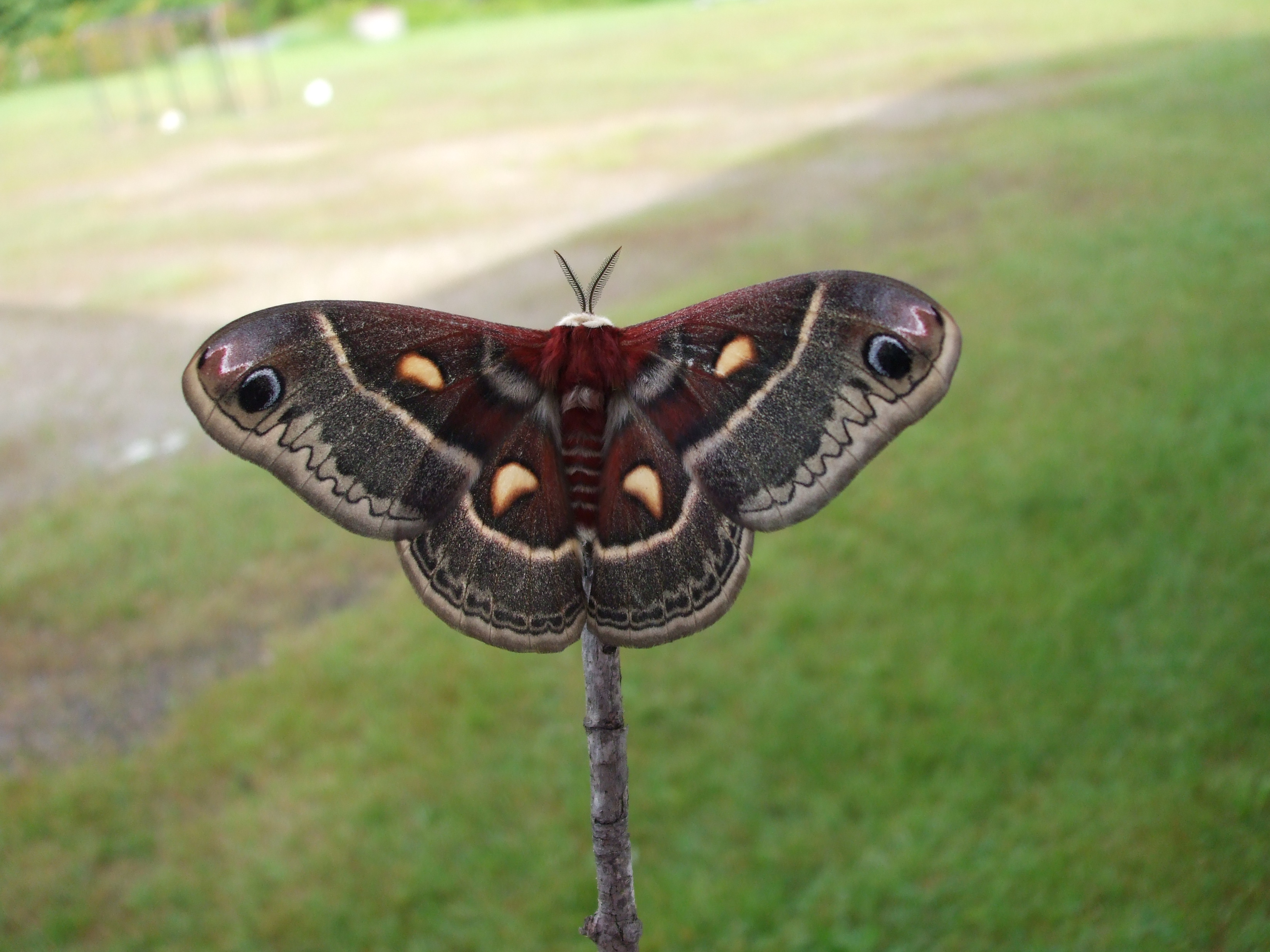

Conservation status
- Apparently Secure (NatureServe)

Scientific classification
- Domain: Eukaryota
- Kingdom: Animalia
- Phylum: Arthropoda
- Class: Insecta
- Order: Lepidoptera
- Family: Saturniidae
- Genus: Hyalophora
- Species: H. columbia

Binomial name
- Hyalophora columbia (S. I. Smith, 1865)

Synonyms
- Samia columbia Smith, 1865; Hyalophora gloveri (Strecker, 1872); Platysamia gloveri Strecker, 1872; Platysamia gloveri var. reducta Neumoegen, 1891; Platysamia columbia nokomis Brodie, 1894; Platysamia columbia winonah Brodie, 1894

= Hyalophora columbia =

Species of moth

Hyalophora columbia, the Columbia silkmoth or larch silkmoth, is a moth of the family Saturniidae. In the east it is found from Quebec and Ontario to Michigan, northern Wisconsin, and south-eastern Manitoba. In the west it is found from Alberta and Montana south through the Rocky Mountains to south-western Texas and into central Mexico. The species was first described by Sidney Irving Smith in 1865.

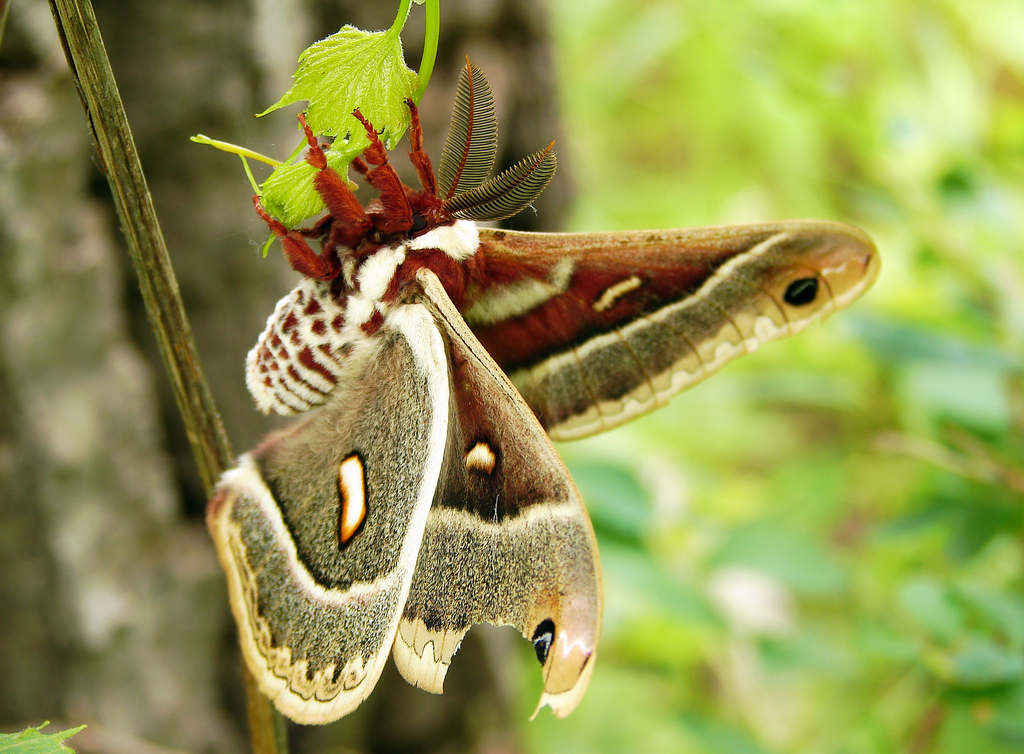

The wingspan is 80–100 mm. Adults are on wing from May to July. There is one generation per year.

The larvae feed on Larix laricina in the eastern part of their range. Furthermore, it has been recorded on in Prunus pensylvanica, Alnus rugosa and Betula papyrifera in western Ontario. In the west they feed on Prunus demissa, Prunus emarginata, Purshia tridentata, Rosa, Salix, Shepherdia argentea, Eleagnus angustifolius and Ceanothus.

== Subspecies ==
- Hyalophora columbia columbia
- Hyalophora columbia gloveri (Rocky Mountains) - also considered a separate species as Hyalophora gloveri
