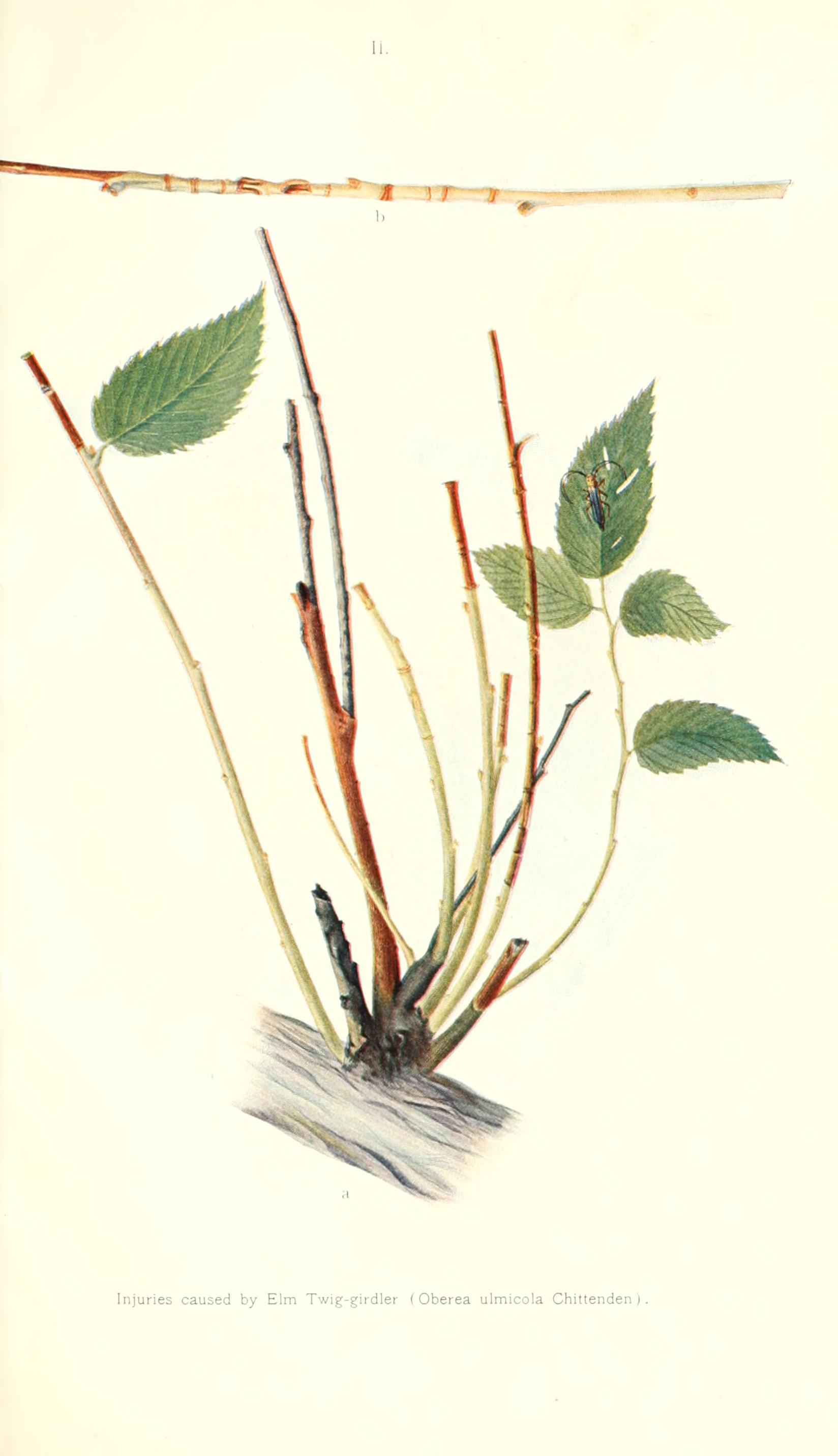

Scientific classification
- Domain: Eukaryota
- Kingdom: Animalia
- Phylum: Arthropoda
- Class: Insecta
- Order: Coleoptera
- Suborder: Polyphaga
- Infraorder: Cucujiformia
- Family: Cerambycidae
- Genus: Oberea
- Species: O. ulmicola

Binomial name
- Oberea ulmicola Chittenden, 1904

= Oberea ulmicola =

Species of beetle

Oberea ulmicola is a species of beetle in the family Cerambycidae. It was described by Chittenden in 1904. It is known from North America. It feeds on Prunus virginiana.
