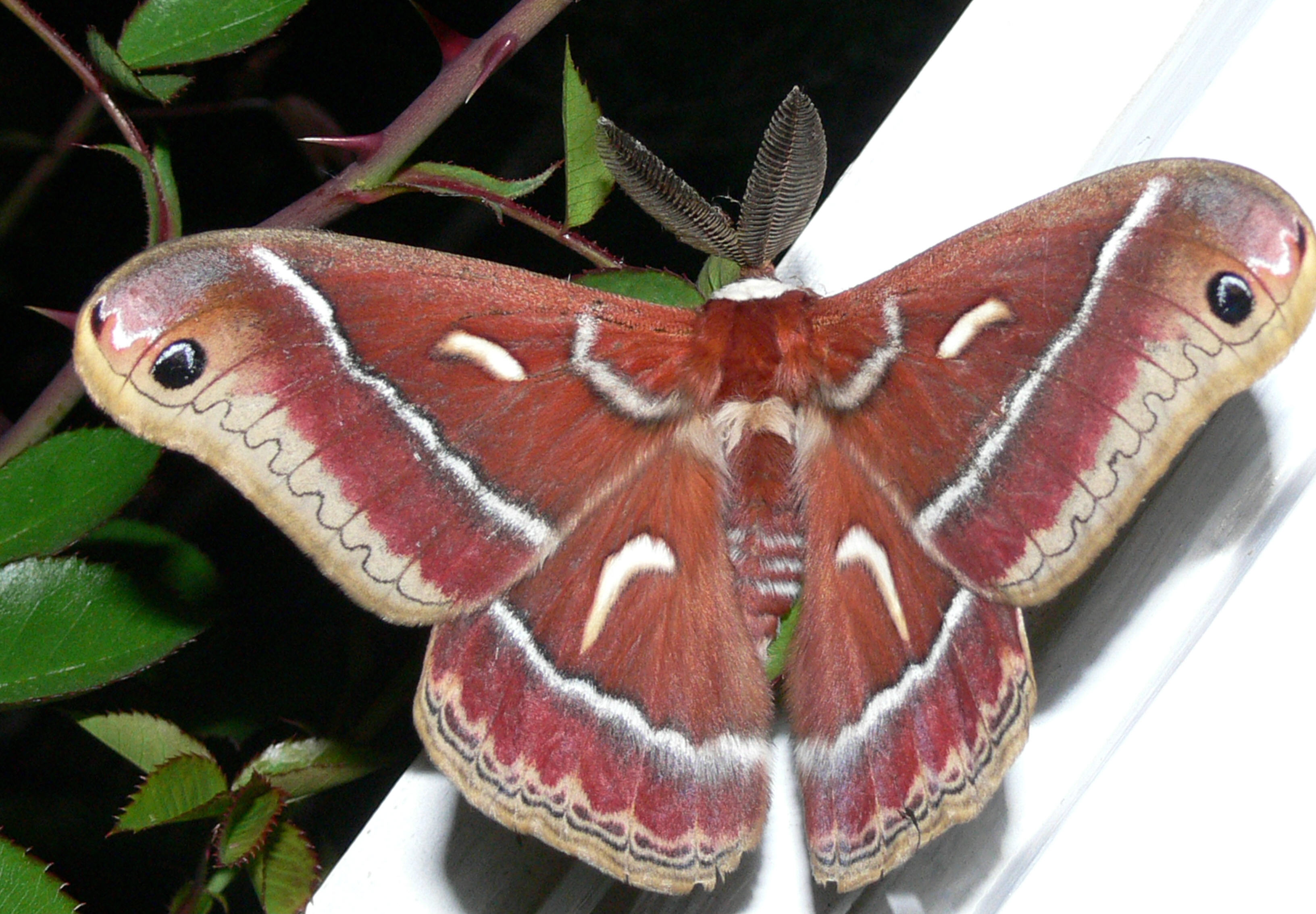

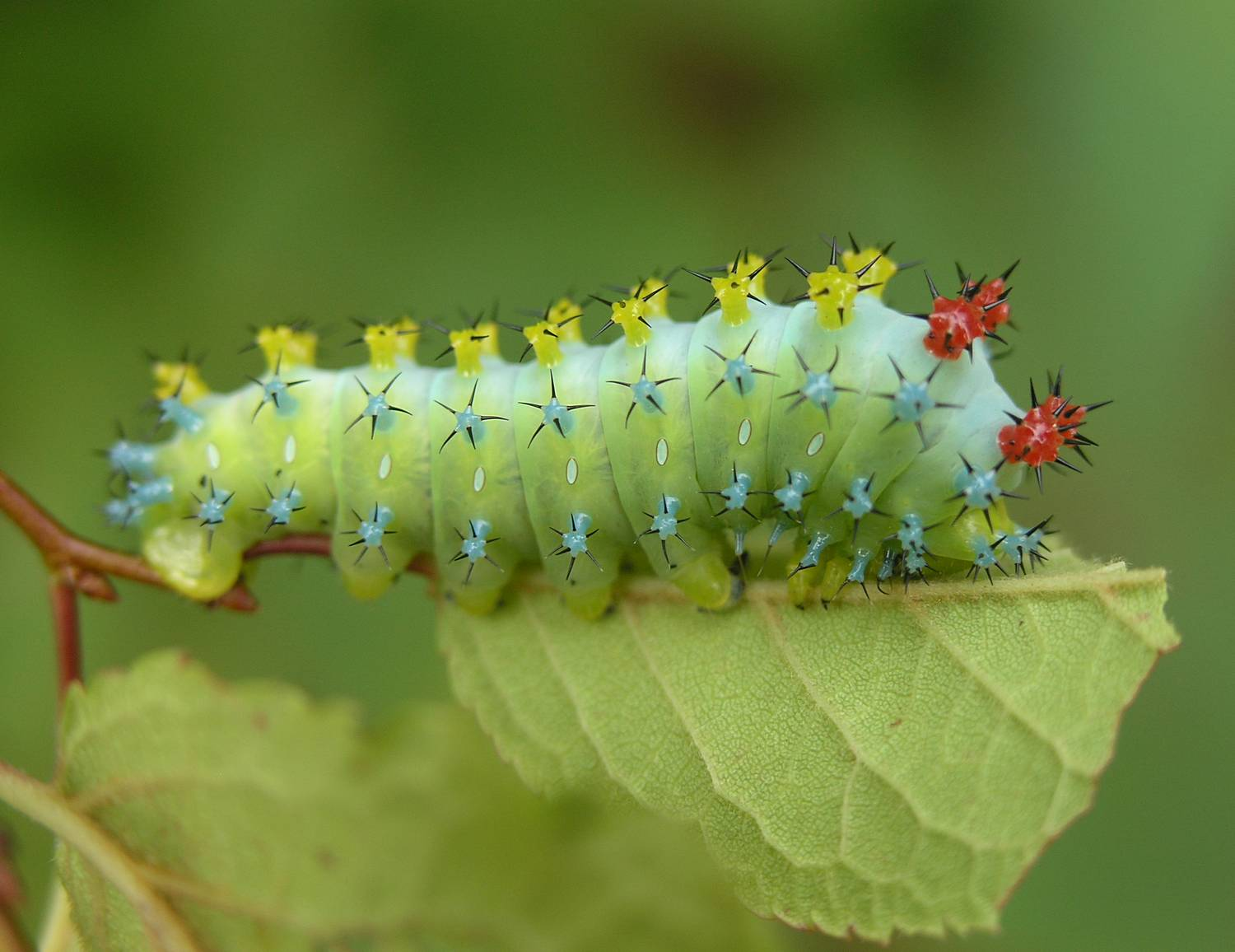
- H. euryalus imago and H. cecropia caterpillar

Scientific classification
- Domain: Eukaryota
- Kingdom: Animalia
- Phylum: Arthropoda
- Class: Insecta
- Order: Lepidoptera
- Family: Saturniidae
- Tribe: Attacini
- Genus: Hyalophora; Duncan [& Westwood], 1841

Synonyms
- Platysamia Grote, 1865

= Hyalophora =

Genus of moths

Hyalophora is a genus of moths in the family Saturniidae. The genus was erected by James Duncan and John O. Westwood in 1841.

== Species ==
- Hyalophora cecropia (Linnaeus, 1758) – cecropia moth
- Hyalophora columbia (S.I. Smith, 1865) – Columbia silkmoth or larch silkmoth
- Hyalophora euryalus (Boisduval, 1855) – ceanothus silkmoth
- Hyalophora gloveri Strecker, 1872 – Glover's silkmoth
- Hyalophora leonis (Naumann, Nassig & Nogueira, 2014)
- Hyalophora mexicana (Nässig, Nogueira G. & Naumann, 2014)
