= Bamberger Ranch Preserve =

Ecological restoration and conservation project in Texas

Coordinates: 30.19919°N 98.45297°W

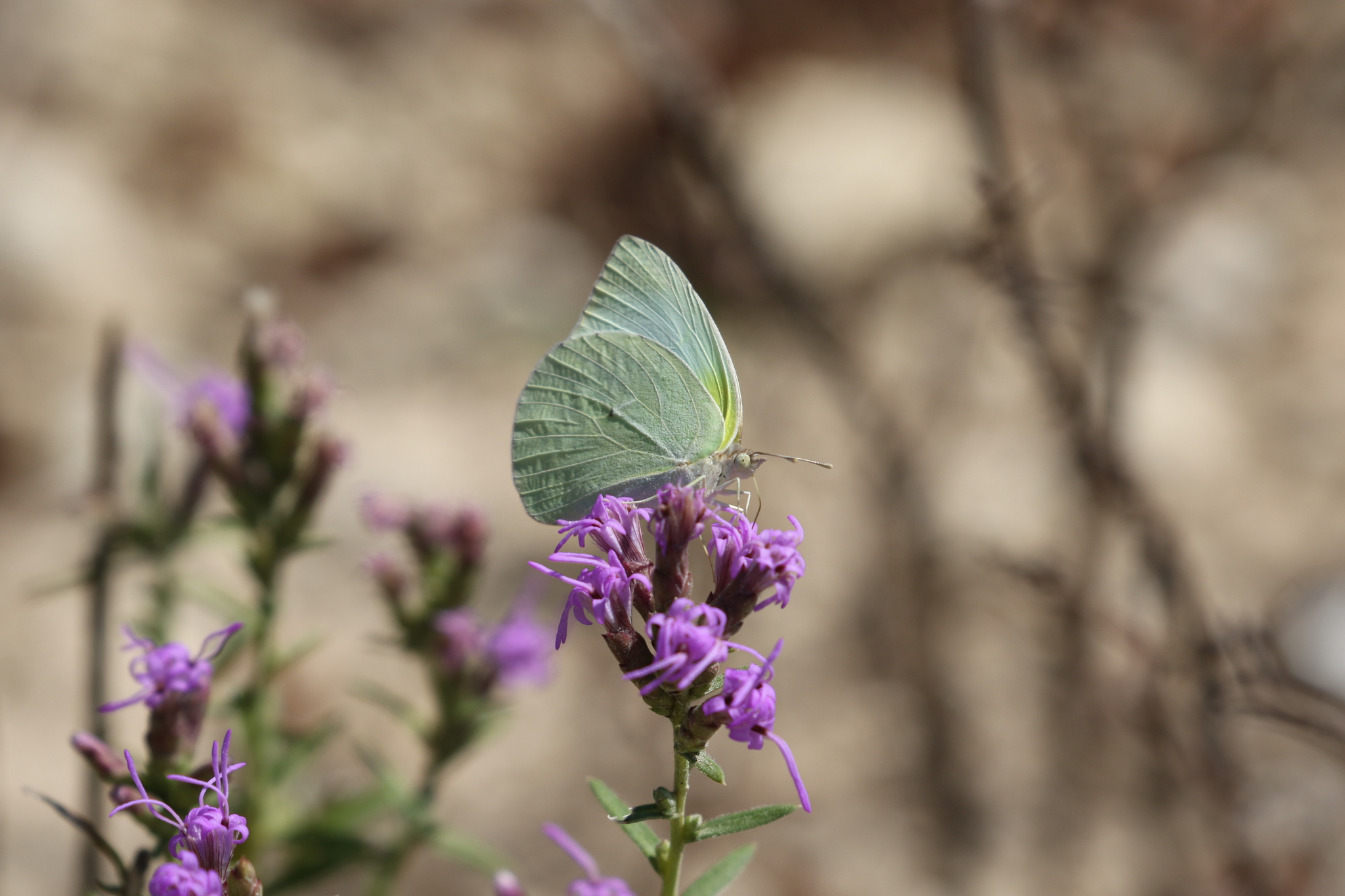
Lyside sulphur butterfly at Bamberger

Bamberger Ranch, also called Selah, is a 5,500 acres (22 km^{2}) ecological restoration and conservation project near Johnson City, in Blanco County, Texas in the Texas Hill Country.

== History ==
Former Church's Fried Chicken executive J. David Bamberger (born 1928—died January 17, 2026) created the preserve in 1969.

Bamberger specifically sought out a worn-out ranch with poor economic prospects and when he found Selah, “The ranch was mostly bare ground or infested with cedar (Juniperus ashei). There was no grass and absolutely no live creeks, springs, or ponds.”

After removing the "cedar" and planting native grasses, rainwater infiltration improved and the aquifer underlying the property refilled. The site now has several running springs that did not exist when Bamberger bought the place.

Bird biodiversity on the land has increased from around 50 species to over 220 species.

The ranch also works to promulgate endangered species. It has a herd of scimitar-horned oryx (native to Africa), and Bamberger also markets the Texas snowbell tree to other ranchers.

== Bat cave ==
The site has its own human-built bat cave, completed in 1998 and called the Chiroptorium. The Chiroptorium is now home to a colony of 200,000 Mexican free-tailed bats.

== See also ==
- Distant Hill Gardens and Nature Trail, New Hampshire
