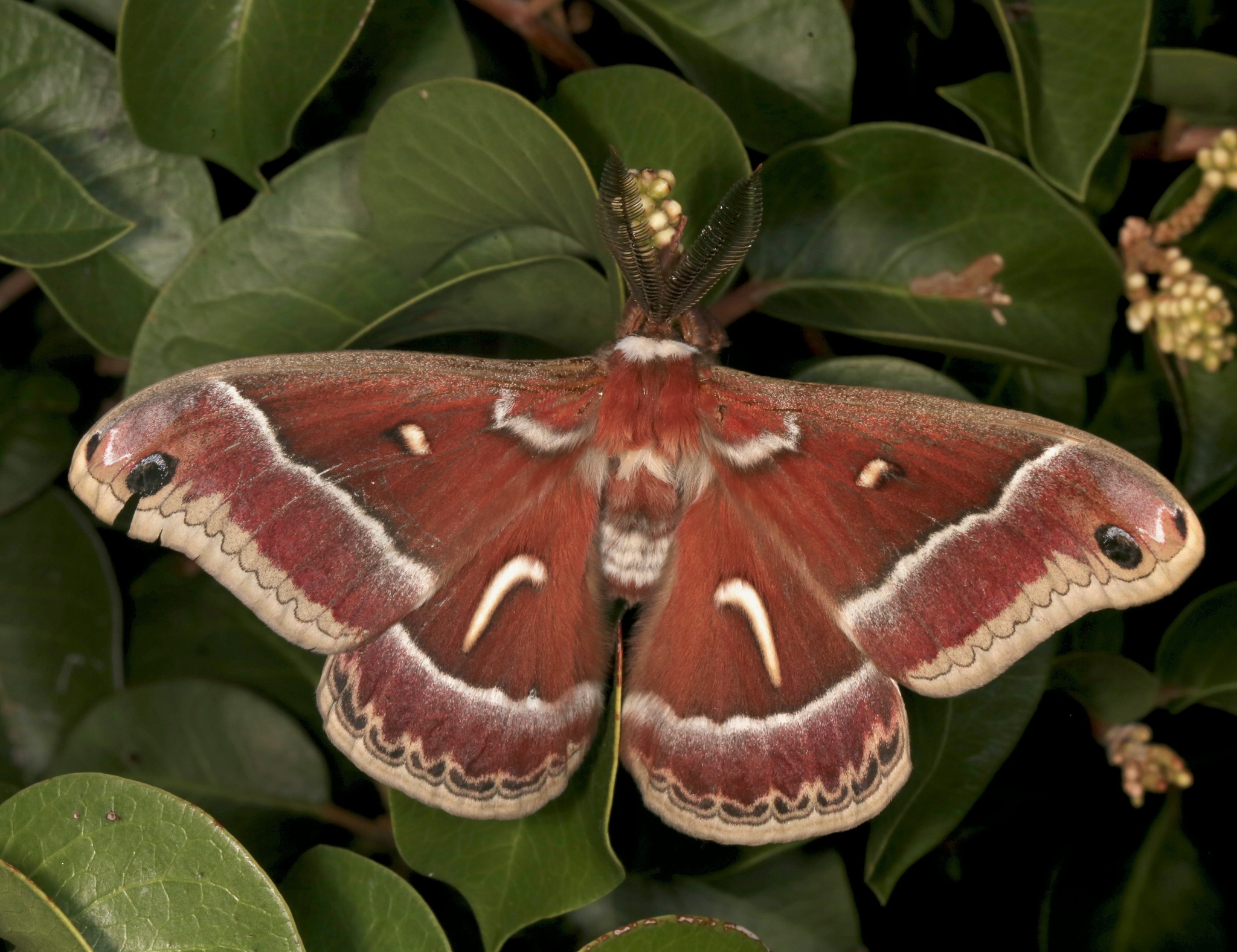

Scientific classification
- Kingdom: Animalia
- Phylum: Arthropoda
- Clade: Pancrustacea
- Class: Insecta
- Order: Lepidoptera
- Family: Saturniidae
- Genus: Hyalophora
- Species: H. euryalus

Binomial name
- Hyalophora euryalus Boisduval, 1855

Synonyms
- Saturnia euryalus; Hyalophora californica; Hyalophora ceanothi; Samia rubra; Hyalophora parvimacula; Hyalophora kasloensis; Samia euryalus

= Hyalophora euryalus =

Species of moth

Hyalophora euryalus, the ceanothus silkmoth, is a moth of the family Saturniidae. The species was first described by Jean Baptiste Boisduval in 1855. It is found in the forests and valleys of the Pacific Northwest, but has been observed as south as Baja California.

== Description ==
It is a reddish-brown moth with black and white patterning spots. The postmedial band and various spots are black and white. The edges of the wings vary from light brown to gray. Its antennae are fluffy and black. The wingspan is 89–127 mm. Adults are on wing from January to July depending on the location. There is one generation per year.

== Habitat ==
It is found in the dry intermontane valleys and interior of British Columbia, Canada, (as far north as Prince George along the Fraser River) south to Baja California in Mexico.

A subspecies, Hyalophora euryalus cedrocensis, is found on the Isla de Cedros, a small island off the west coast of Baja California, Mexico.

Other habitats include coastal rainforests, hardwood forests, montane forests, and juniper woodlands.

A hardwood forest. An example of one of the habitats that H. euryalus may be found.

== Biology ==
=== Diet ===
The larvae feed on numerous hostplants including those in the Rhamnaceae (Ceanothus, Rhamnus californica), Ericaceae (Arctostaphylos, Arbutus menziesii), Betulaceae (Alnus, Betula), Rosaceae (Prunus, Cercocarpus betuloides), Grossulariaceae (Ribes), Salicaceae (Salix) and Pinaceae (Pseudotsuga menziesii).

The adults emerge without functional mouthparts or digestive track. Because of this, adults do not feed and live for about one to two weeks.

=== Development ===
H. euryalus are univoltine, and only produce one generation of offspring per year from January to July. Eggs are laid on the leaves and branches of host plants, and are multicolored white and brown.

Once hatching, larvae undergoes five instar stages, changing color over the course of this stage. The body starts off black, but changes to green over the course of multiple instar stages. The larvae are characterized by yellow to red-orange scoli, the branched spikes on its back.

When it is time to pupate, the individual spins itself a cocoon on a part of its host plant. The chrysalis starts out with white silk, but becomes dark brown by the end of its formation. The pupa's cocoon is observed to have cold resistant properties. Individuals from the Okanagan Valley have been observed to be able to withstand temperatures of -30°C. As individuals spend winter in the pupa stage, this is most likely to help the pupae survive overwintering in harsh environments, as the Okanagan Valley's temperatures have been observed to drop as low as -26.7°C.

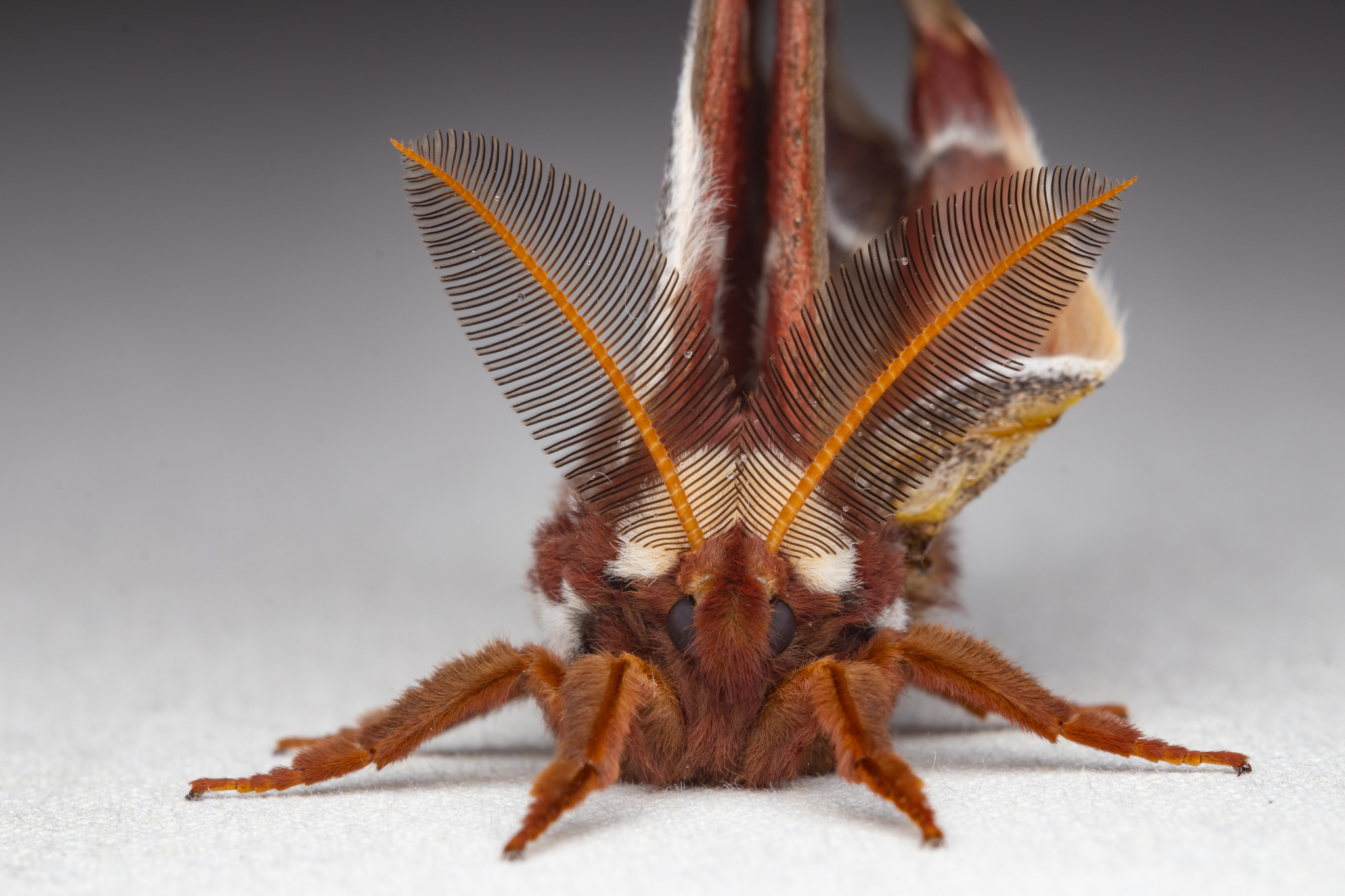
A close up photo of H. euryalus's antennae, which are used to detect pheromones.

Adults emerge and are observed from early spring to summer, with most adults being found in late May and early June. Adults are nocturnal, and release pheromones at night to attract mates. The antennae are used as detectors to track those released pheromones.

=== Protective coloration and mimicry ===
The larvae may change its appearance depending on its hostplant, undergoing crypsis camouflage. The larvae are the most sensitive to their hostplant at the third instar.

The adult's wing patterns are observed to have a function to protect the organism from predators. The markings have evolved to resemble the eyes of a vertebrate, which have been seen to deter predators away from an individual, being especially useful against birds. Other spots and markings have been able to protect the organism by being conspicuous.

== Species interactions and hybridization ==
A hybrid zone between H. euryalus and H. columbia gloveri has been observed in the Sierra Nevada mountains.

This hybrid is categorized under the species name H. kasloensis. Hybrid larvae are characterized at the fourth and fifth instars through their scoli, having all black scoli in the fourth instar and having spiny red dorsal scoli only in their fifth instar. Adults are classified by being overall darker, having a separated hindwing discal spot and postmedial band, a smaller hindwing discal spot, and black scaling on the postmedial band.

Hybridization has been proven through allozyme analysis.

== Cultural significance ==
Cocoons of H. euryalus were incorporated into hand rattles by California Indigenous tribes.
