= Archips rileyanus =

Scientific classification
- Kingdom: Animalia
- Phylum: Arthropoda
- Class: Insecta
- Order: Lepidoptera
- Family: Tortricidae
- Genus: Archips
- Species: A. rileyanus

Binomial name
- Archips rileyanus (Grote, 1868)

Synonyms
- Tortrix rileyana Grote, 1868; Archips rileyana; Cacoecia fervidana Walker, 1863

Species of moth

Archips rileyanus, the southern ugly-nest caterpillar moth, is a species of moth of the family Tortricidae. It is found in North America, where it has been recorded from Alabama, Florida, Georgia, Maine, Mississippi, Missouri, North Carolina, Ohio, Tennessee, Texas, Virginia and West Virginia.

The wingspan is 19–26 mm. Adults have been recorded on wing in March and from May to July.

The larvae feed on Aesculus (including Aesculus californica and Aesculus pavia), Carya, Cornus, Juglans, Prunus, Symphoricarpos and Vernonia species.
