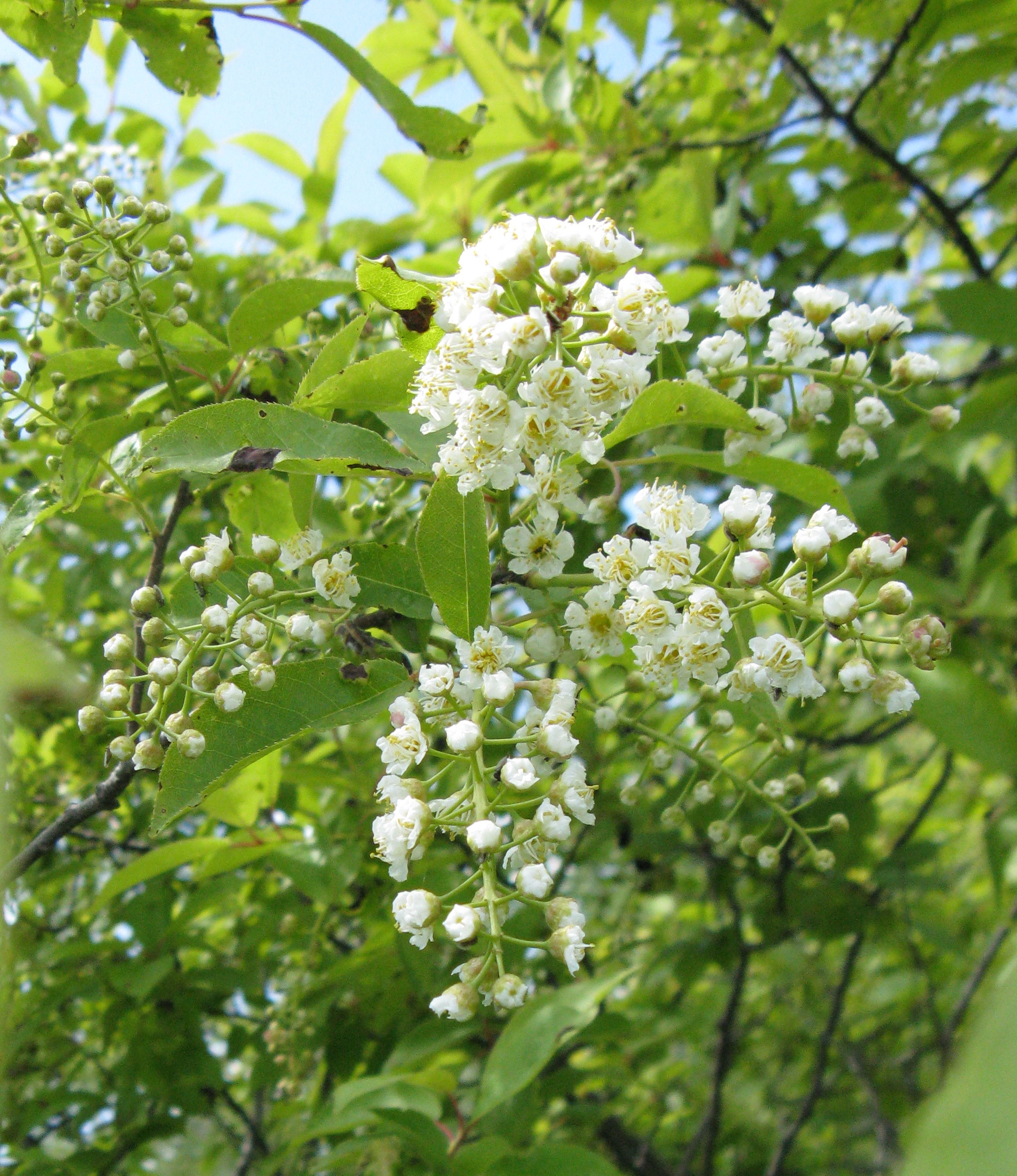
- Prunus virginiana var. virginiana (eastern chokecherry) in bloom

Conservation status
- Least Concern (IUCN 3.1)

Scientific classification
- Kingdom: Plantae
- Clade: Tracheophytes
- Clade: Angiosperms
- Clade: Eudicots
- Clade: Rosids
- Order: Rosales
- Family: Rosaceae
- Genus: Prunus
- Subgenus: Prunus subg. Padus
- Species: P. virginiana

Binomial name
- Prunus virginiana L.
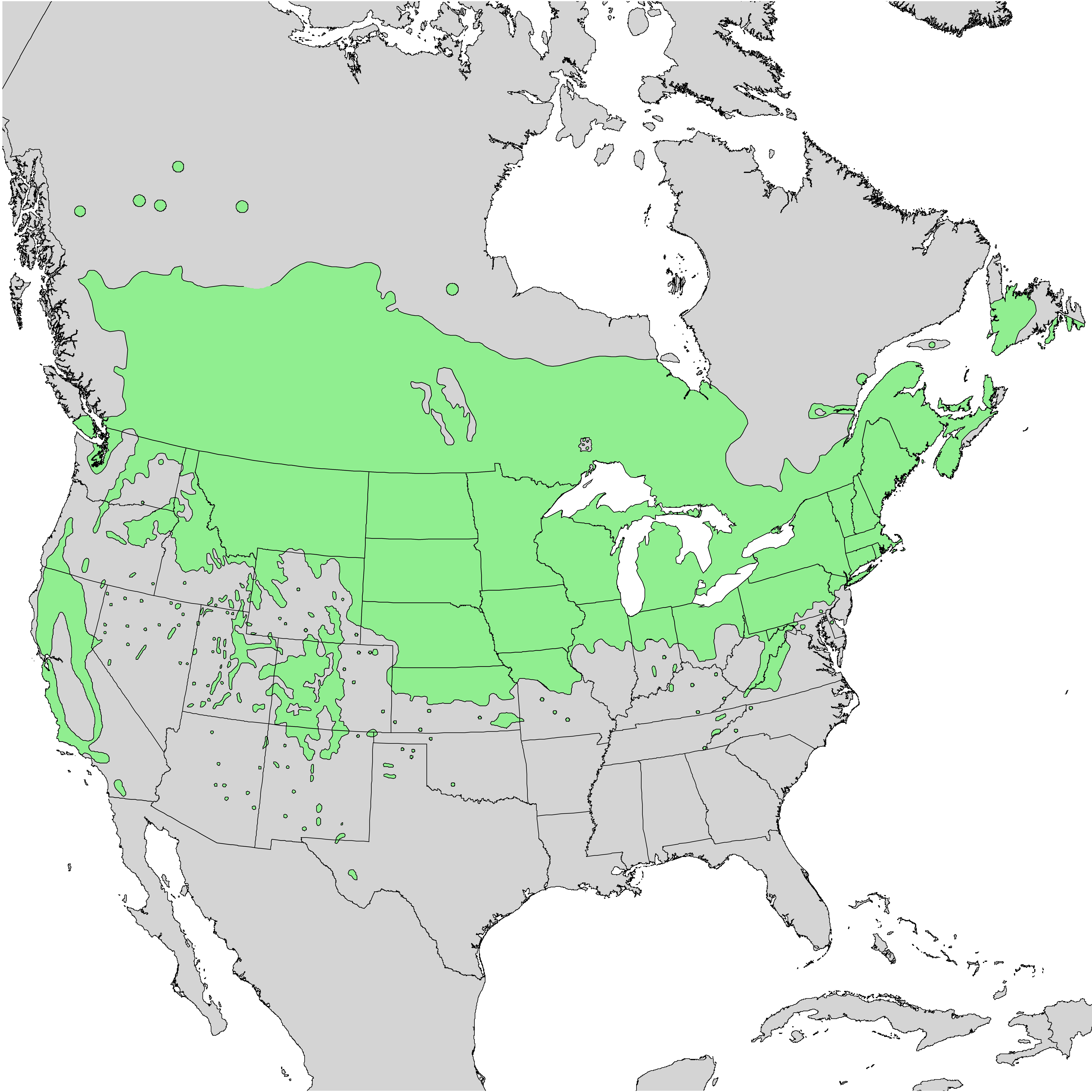
- Natural range

Synonyms
- List: Cerasus virginica Michx. ex hort.; Padus rubra Mill.; Padus virginiana (L.) Mill.; Padus virginiana (L.) M.Roem.; Prunus virginica Steud.; Cerasus demissa Nutt. ex Torr. & A.Gray, syn of var. demissa; Padus demissa (Nutt. ex Torr. & A.Gray) M.Roem., syn of var. demissa; Prunus demissa (Nutt. ex Torr. & A.Gray) Walp., syn of var. demissa; Padus melanocarpa (A.Nelson) Shafer, syn of var. melanocarpa; Prunus melanocarpa (A.Nelson) Rydb., syn of var. melanocarpa; Padus valida Wooton & Standl; Prunus valida (Wooton & Standl.) Rydb.; Prunus virginalis Wender.; Prunus arguta Bigel. ex M. Roem.; Prunus canadensis Marshall; Prunus densiflora Steud.; Prunus duerinckii Walp.; Prunus dumosa Salisb.; Prunus fimbriata Steud.; Prunus micrantha Steud.; Prunus montana Hort. ex C. Koch; Prunus obovata Bigel.; Prunus rubra Ait.

= Prunus virginiana =

Species of plant

Prunus virginiana, commonly called bitter-berry, chokecherry, Virginia bird cherry, and western chokecherry (also black chokecherry for P. virginiana var. demissa), is a North American species of bird cherry (Prunus subgenus Padus).

Forming a tree generally up to 6 metres (19 1/2 feet) tall, the leaves are oval, green, and smooth, with racemes of white flowers and red to black drupes. The unripe fruits are toxic, as is the stone and much of the plant, but the ripe fruits are edible, being part of Native American cuisine.

== Description ==
Chokecherry is a suckering shrub or small tree typically growing to 1–6 metres (3 1/2–19 1/2 feet) tall—rarely to 10 m (33 ft)—and a substantial width of 18 m (60 ft). The trunk is up to 30 centimetres (12 inches) in diameter. The leaves are oval, pointed, dark green above with a paler underside, smooth on both surfaces, 2.5–10 cm (1–4 in) in length, and 1.2–5 cm (1/2–2 in) wide, with a serrated margin. The stems rarely exceed 2 cm (3/4 in) in length.

In late spring, well after leaf emergence, white flowers are produced in racemes measuring 4–11 cm (1 1/2–4 1/4 in) long, eventually growing up to 15 cm. The racemes are about 2.5 cm (1 in) wide, with individual flowers up to about 13 millimetres (1/2 in) when open.

The fruits (drupes) are about 6–14 mm (1/4–1/2 in) in diameter, range in color from bright red to black, and possess a very astringent taste, being both somewhat sour and somewhat bitter. They get darker and marginally sweeter as they ripen. They each contain a large stone.

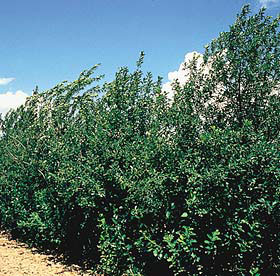
Chokecherry – habit

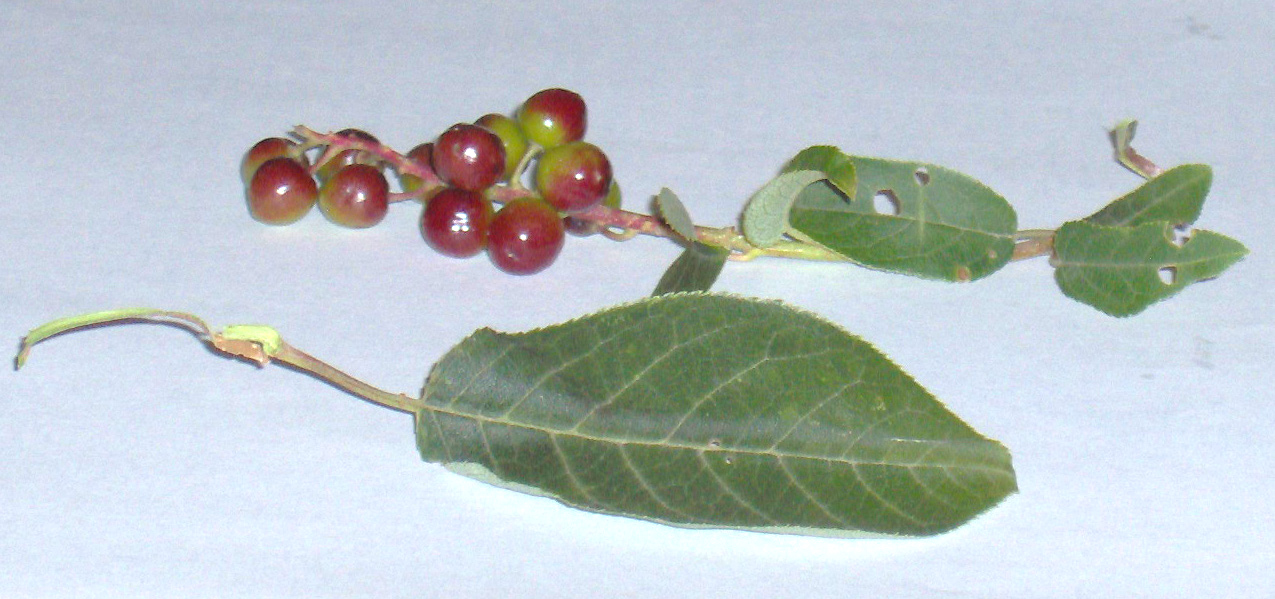
Leaf and drupes of plant in Saskatchewan

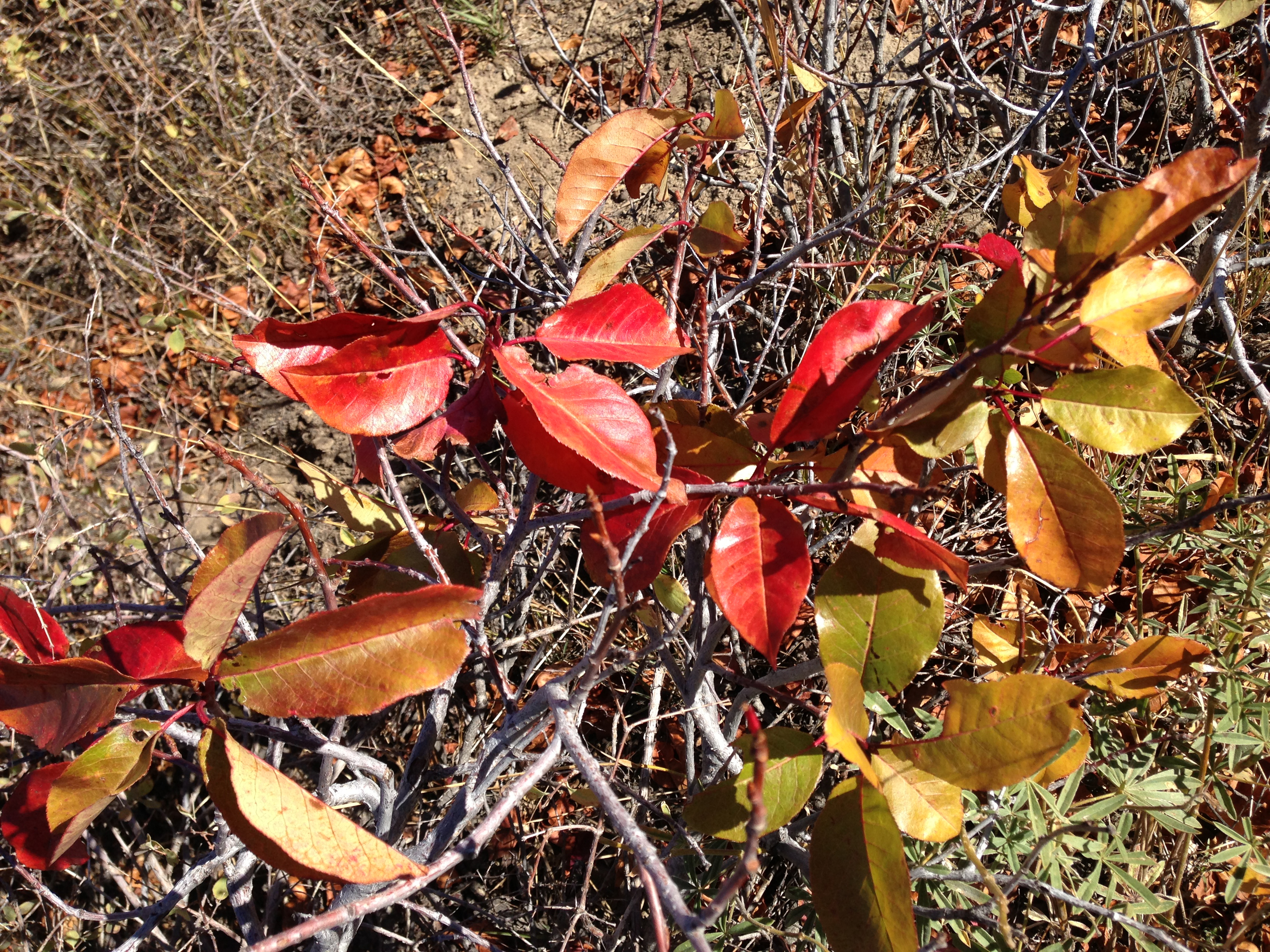
Autumn foliage

=== Chemistry ===
Chokecherries are very high in antioxidant pigment compounds, such as anthocyanins. They share this property with eastern North America's Prunus serotina (black cherry), contributing to confusion.

=== Similar species ===
The chokecherry is closely related to P. serotina, which can reach 30 m (100 ft) tall and has larger, wholly dark green leaves with numerous blunt edges along the margin, in addition to darker fruit.

== Taxonomy ==
The name chokecherry is also used for the related P. maackii (Manchurian cherry or Amur chokecherry).

=== Varieties ===
- Prunus virginiana var. virginiana (eastern chokecherry)
- Prunus virginiana var. demissa (Nutt. ex Torr. & A.Gray) Torr. (western chokecherry)
- Prunus virginiana var. melanocarpa (A.Nelson) Sarg.

== Distribution and habitat ==
The natural historic range of P. virginiana includes most of Canada (including Northwest Territories, but excluding Yukon, Nunavut, and Labrador), most of the United States (including Alaska, but excluding some states in the Southeast), and northern Mexico (Sonora, Chihuahua, Baja California, Durango, Zacatecas, Coahuila, and Nuevo León).

It can be found in habitats ranging from streambanks to montane forests.

== Ecology ==
The wild chokecherry is often considered a pest, as it is a host for the tent caterpillar, a threat to other fruit plants. It is also a larval host to the black-waved flannel moth, the blinded sphinx, the cecropia moth, the coral hairstreak, the cynthia moth, the elm sphinx, Glover's silkmoth, the hummingbird clearwing moth, the imperial moth, the Io moth, the polyphemus moth, the promethea moth, the red-spotted purple, the small-eyed sphinx, the spring azure, the striped hairstreak, the tiger swallowtail, the twin-spotted sphinx, and Weidemeyer's admiral.

Many wildlife, including birds and game animals, eat the berries. Moose, elk, mountain sheep, deer and rabbits eat the foliage, twigs, leaves, and buds. Deer and elk sometimes browse the twigs profusely, not letting the plant grow above knee height. The leaves serve as food for caterpillars of various Lepidoptera.

== Cultivation ==
The chokecherry has a number of cultivars. 'Canada Red' and 'Schubert' have leaves that mature to purple and turn orange and red in the autumn. 'Goertz' has a nonastringent, so palatable, fruit. Research at the University of Saskatchewan seeks to find or create new cultivars to increase production and processing.

== Toxicity ==
The stone of the fruit is poisonous. Chokecherry, including the foliage, is toxic to moose, cattle, goats, deer, and other animals with segmented stomachs (rumens), especially after the leaves have wilted (such as after a frost or after branches have been broken); wilting releases cyanide and makes the plant sweet. About 4.5–9 kilograms (10–20 pounds) of foliage can be fatal. In horses, symptoms include heavy breathing, agitation, and weakness.

The similar fruits of P. caroliniana are also somewhat toxic.

== Uses ==
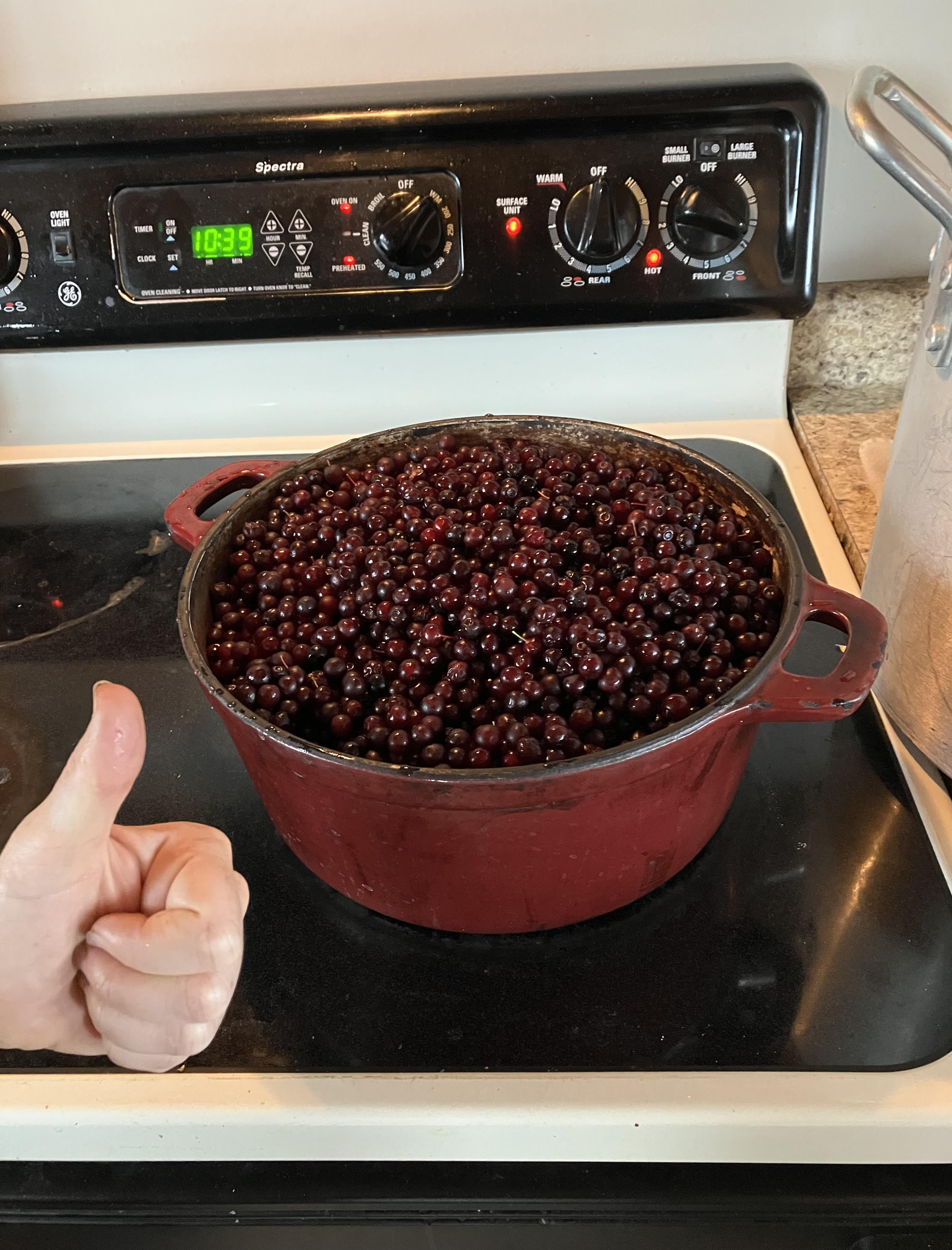
Chokecherries being prepared for wojapi, a traditional Lakota dish

The chokecherry fruit can be eaten when fully ripe, but otherwise contains a toxin. The fruit can be used to make jam or syrup, but the bitter nature of the fruit requires sugar to sweeten the preserves. Chokecherry is also used to make wine in the Western United States, mainly in the Dakotas and Utah, as well as in Manitoba, Canada.

For many Indigenous tribes of the Northern Rockies, Northern Plains, and boreal forest region of Canada and the US, chokecherries are the most important fruit in their traditional diets and part of pemmican, a staple traditional food. The Plains Indians pound up the whole fruits—including the pits—in a mortar, from which they make sun-baked cakes.

The bark of the root is made into an asperous-textured concoction used to ward off or treat colds, fever and stomach maladies by Indigenous people. The inner bark of the chokecherry, as well as red osier dogwood, or alder, is also used by some tribes in ceremonial smoking mixtures, known as kinnikinnick. Nlaka'pamux traditional knowledge holds that when chokecherry starts blooming, bitterroot is ready to be dug up and harvested.

== In culture ==
In 2007, North Dakota governor John Hoeven signed a bill naming the chokecherry the state's official fruit.

== See also ==
- Choke pear
