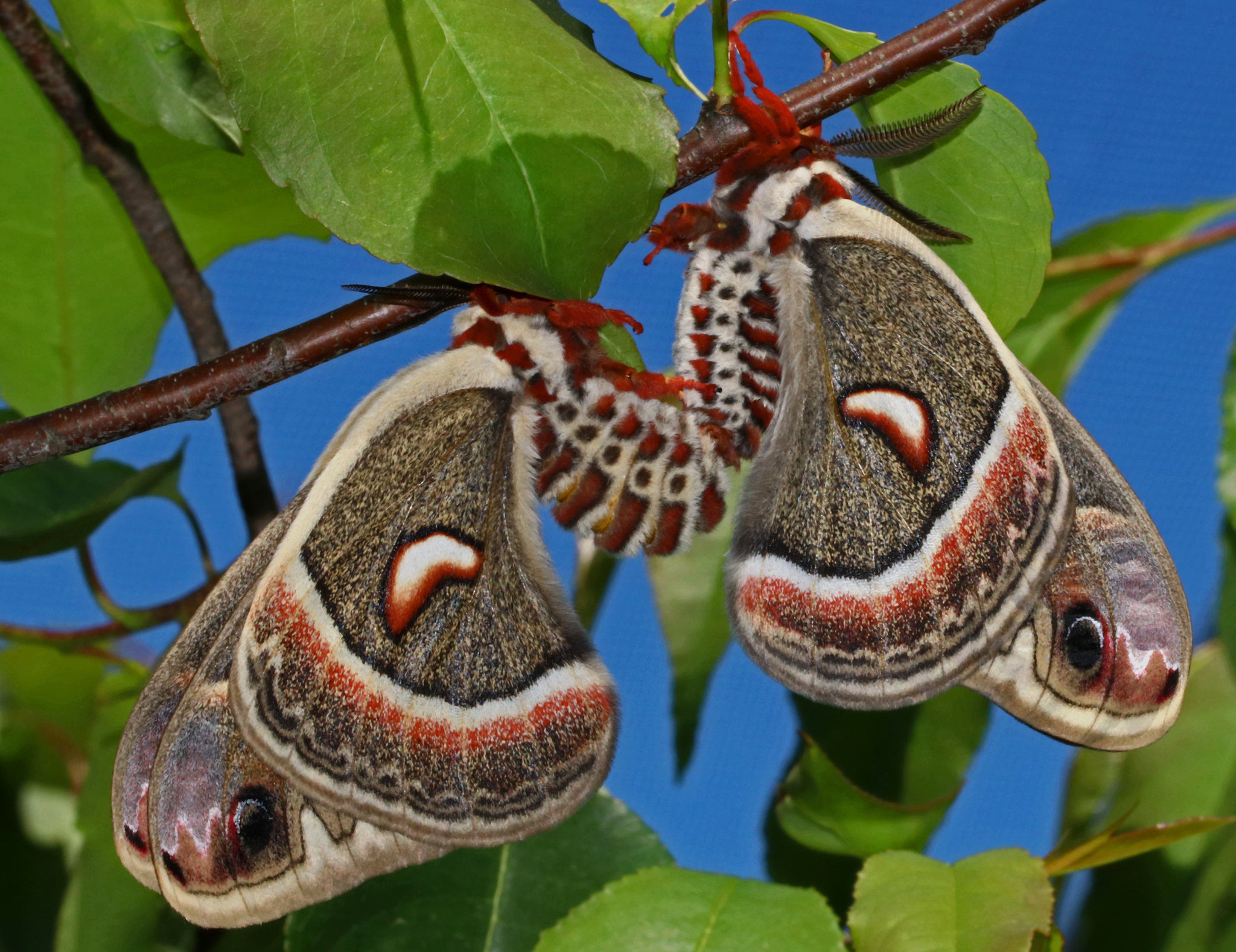
- Adults at Boothbay, Maine
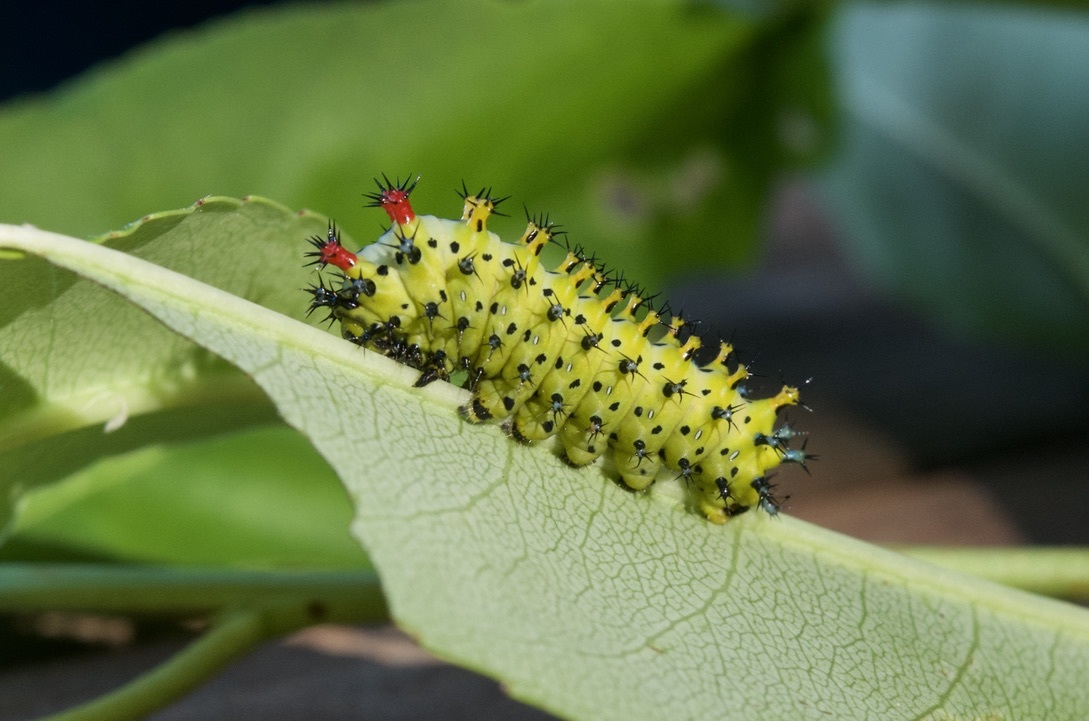
- Caterpillar at Distant Hill Gardens, New Hampshire

Scientific classification
- Kingdom: Animalia
- Phylum: Arthropoda
- Clade: Pancrustacea
- Class: Insecta
- Order: Lepidoptera
- Family: Saturniidae
- Genus: Hyalophora
- Species: H. cecropia

Binomial name
- Hyalophora cecropia (Linnaeus, 1758)

Synonyms
- Phalaena cecropia Linnaeus, 1758; Samia cecropia

= Hyalophora cecropia =

Cecropia moth

Species of moth

Hyalophora cecropia, the cecropia moth, is North America's largest native moth. It is a member of the family Saturniidae, or giant silk moths. Females have been documented with a wingspan of 5 to 7 in (13 to 18 cm) or more. These moths can be found predominantly across eastern North America, with occurrences as far west as Washington and north into most Canadian provinces. Cecropia moth larvae are most commonly found on maple trees, but they have also been found on cherry and birch trees, among many others. The species was first described by Carl Linnaeus in his 1758 10th edition of Systema Naturae.

== Lifecycle ==
Like other members of the giant silk moth family, the adult cecropia moth lacks functional mouth parts and a digestive system, so they only survive for around 2 weeks.

To find a mate, the female cecropia moth emits pheromones, which the male detects with his sensitive antennae. Male cecropia moths can detect these pheromones from up to a mile away, although a male may fly up to 7 miles while searching for a female. Mating typically begins early in the morning and lasts until the evening.

After mating, the female lays up to 100 eggs. These eggs are mottled reddish brown and usually found on either side of a host leaf. They eventually hatch into tiny black caterpillars.

Typically, the five larval instars (developmental stages) each last about 1 week. The first-instar larvae are black in color, due to small, black hairs growing from tubercles (small projections) all over their bodies. These larvae feed upon many common trees and shrubs, including maple, birch, and apple. As the caterpillars grow larger in the second instar, they become yellow green. During the third, fourth, and fifth instars, cecropia moths become rather large and bluish green. At these final stages, the tubercles become blue, yellow, or orange, depending on the location on the body, while the black hairs are eventually lost. The caterpillars reach maturity in autumn and are about 4 to 4.5 in (100 to 110 mm) long.

Once the caterpillars reach maturity, they spin large, brown cocoons lengthways on trees or wooden structures. They then emerge as adults in the first 2 weeks of seasonally warm weather in early summer. Hyalophora cecropia moths are univoltine, with only one generation per year.

Upon reaching adulthood, their size is variable. They are usually quite large, with a wingspan around 5 to 7 in (130 to 180 mm). The cecropia moth's wings are brownish with red near the base of the forewing. Crescent-shaped spots of red with whitish centers are on all wings, but they are larger on the hindwings. All wings have whitish coloration followed by reddish bands of shading beyond the postmedial line that runs longitudinally down the center of all four wings. The body is hairy, with reddish coloring on the anterior, and fading to reddish/whitish. The abdomen has alternating red and white bands.

== Threats ==
Moth pests have become a significant problem.

Parasitoids, such as some species of wasps and flies, lay their eggs in or on the young caterpillars. The eggs then hatch into larvae, which consume the caterpillar's internal organs and muscles. The parasitoids release chemicals that override the regulatory mechanisms of the caterpillars. Once the parasitoids have grown enough, they induce the caterpillars to pupate, when the parasitoid larvae themselves pupate, killing the cecropia pupae.

Squirrels also consume the pupae of cecropia moths, which can significantly decrease their populations.

Pruning of trees and leaving outdoor lights on at night can also be detrimental to cecropia moths.

Compsilura concinnata, introduced to North America to control the invasive gypsy moth (Lymantria dispar), is a particular threat to the native North American cecropia moth.

== In science ==
The original description of the insect juvenile hormone by Carroll Williams in Nature in 1956 is from the cecropia silkworm. This large insect had enough juvenile hormone in its abdomen to permit the extraction of detectable amounts from a single specimen.

Cecropin, a major protein involved in the humoral immunity of most insects, was first isolated from and named after Hyalophota cecropia.

== Accidental transport ==
In August 2012, a cecropia moth caterpillar was accidentally imported from Ontario to St. John's, Newfoundland, via a shipment of dogwood shrubs. Cecropia moths are not native to the latter province. Within 48 hours of its arrival, the caterpillar began spinning a cocoon; it wintered at the federal Agriculture and Agri-Food research facility in St. John's, to which the owner of the importing company had transferred it. On May 29, 2013, the predominantly black and red female moth — named Georgina by the facility's staff — emerged from her cocoon with a roughly 20 cm (7.9 in) wingspan. After allowing Georgina to complete her natural lifespan, researchers planned to pin and preserve her for future study.

== Lifecycle gallery ==
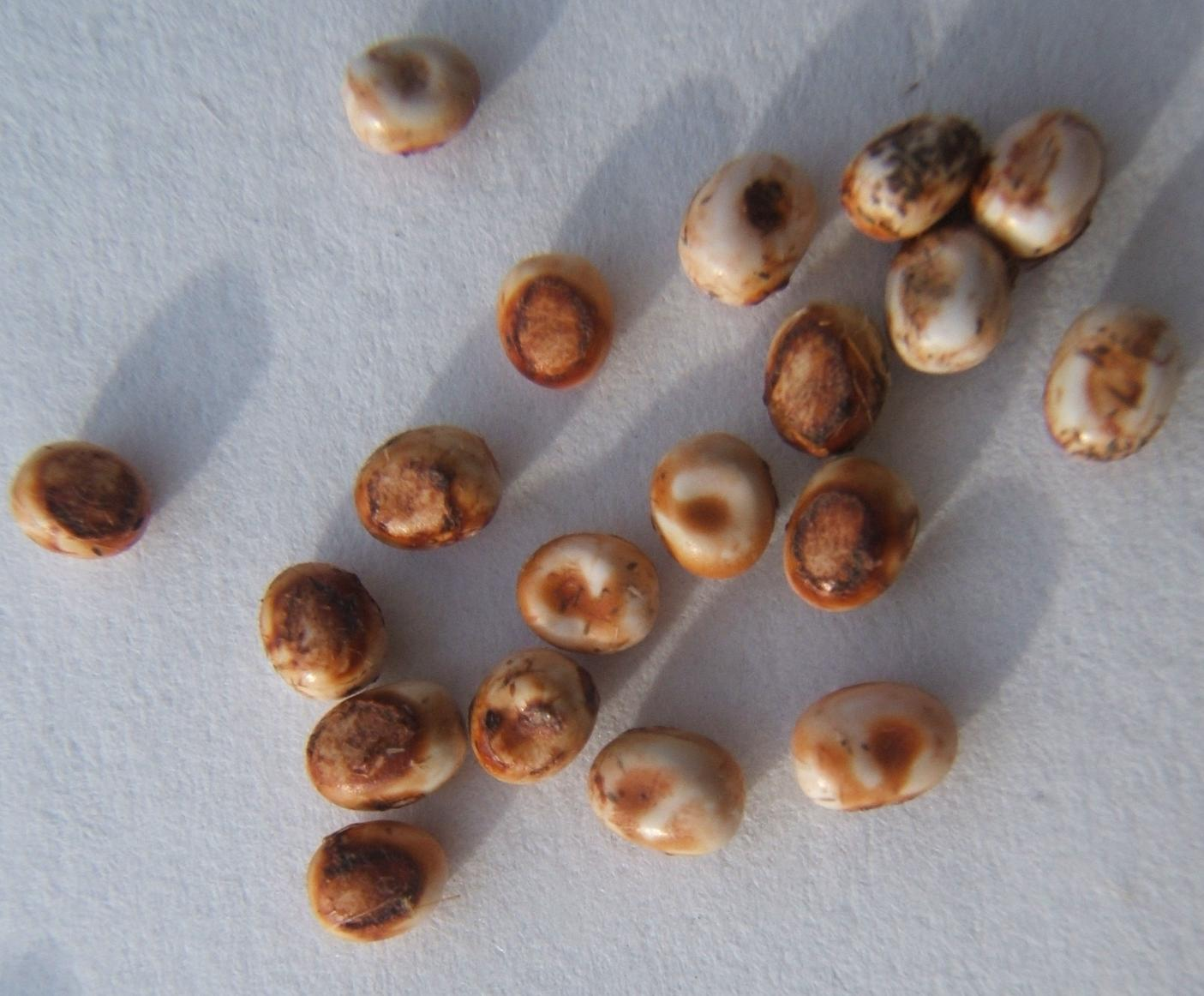
Cecropia eggs

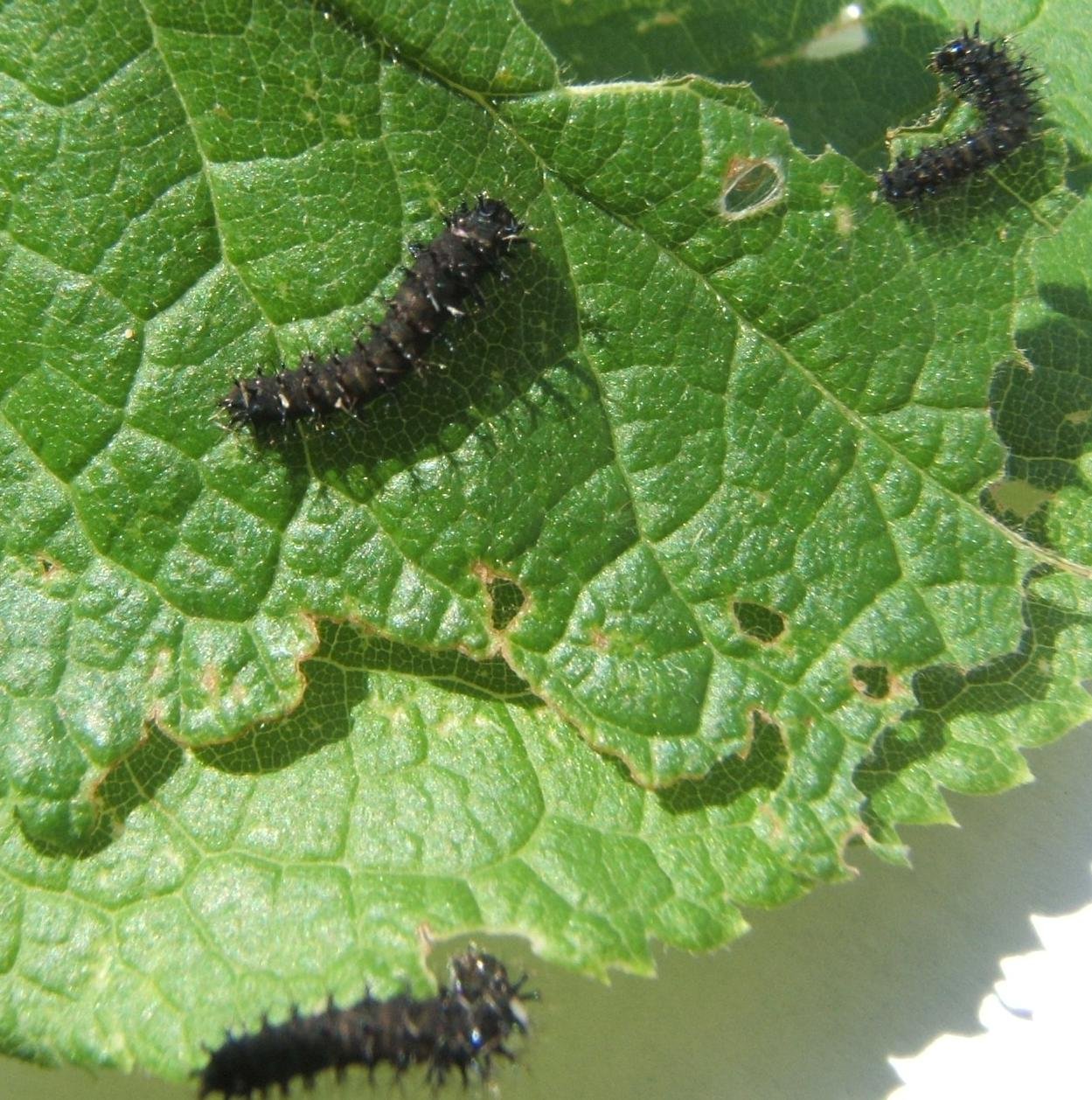
1st instar reared on cherry

Caterpillar

Caterpillar tubercles

Caterpillar feet

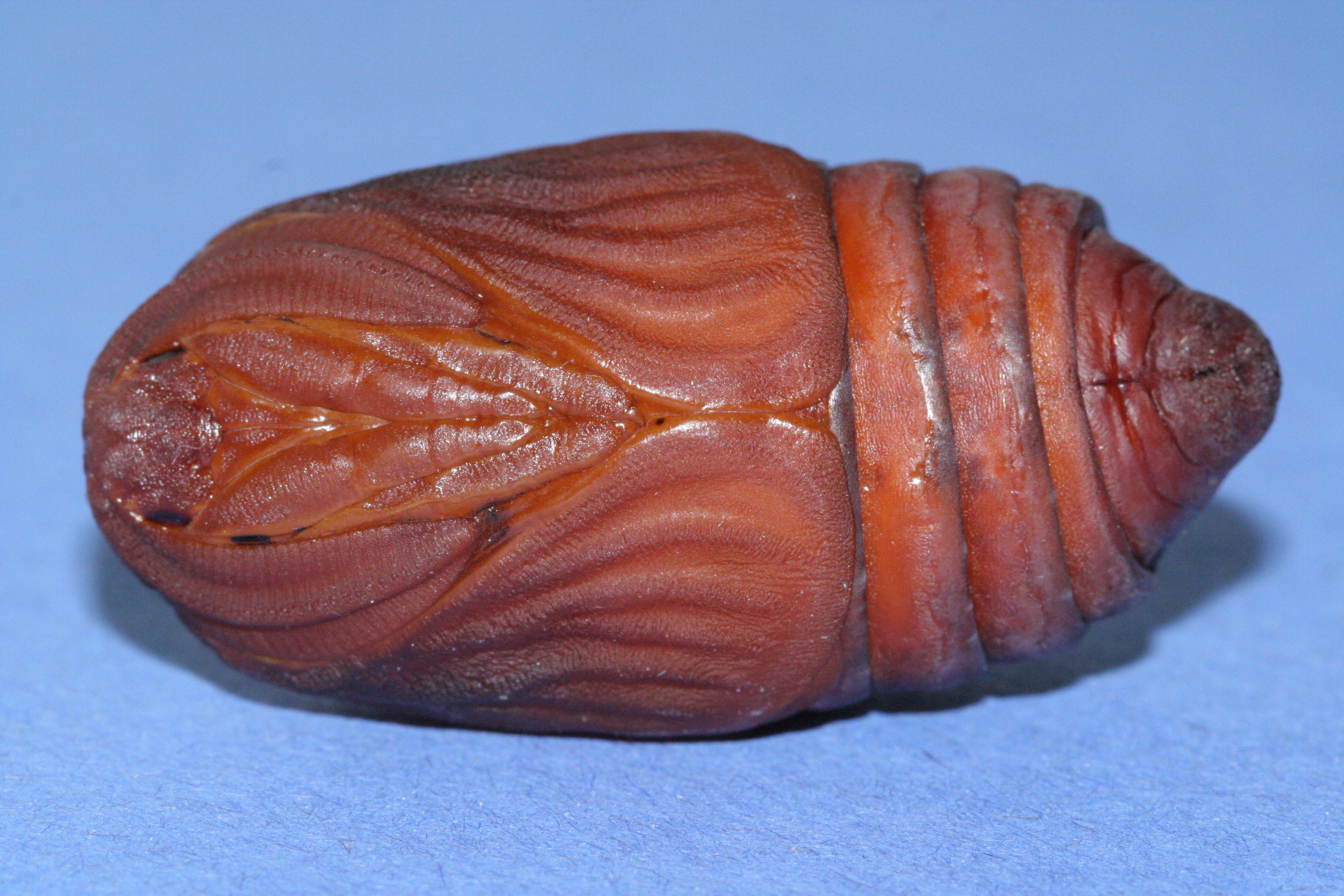
Female pupa

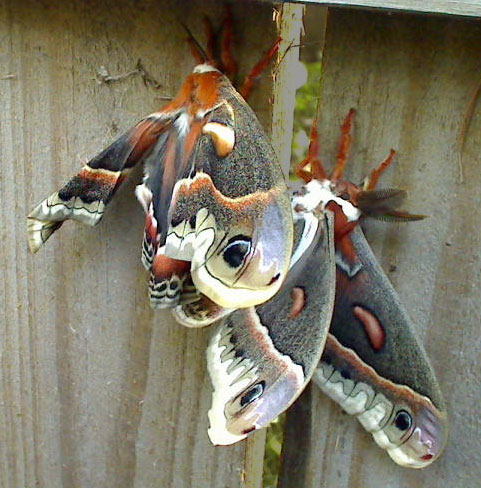
Mating

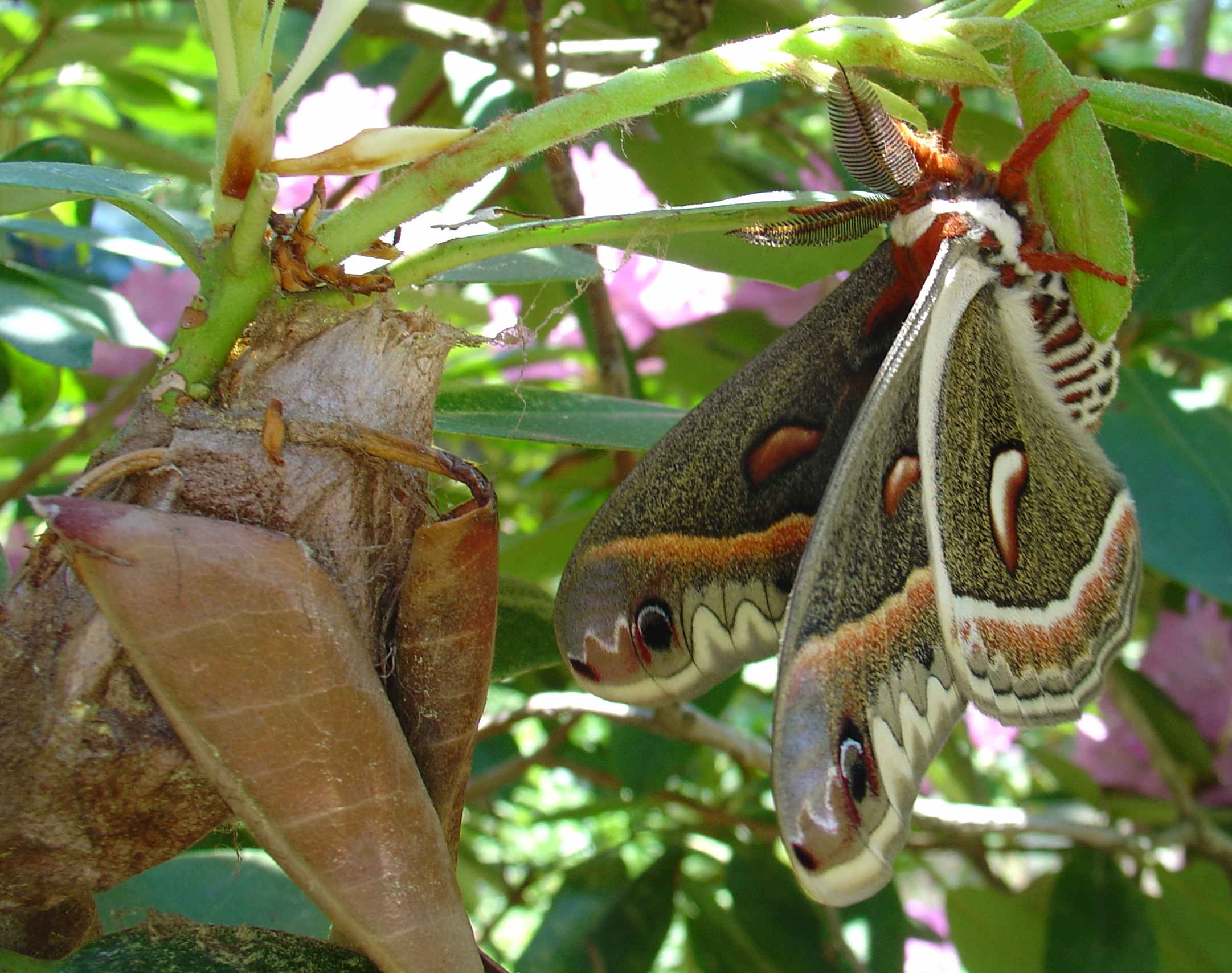
Adult male cecropia shortly after eclosion

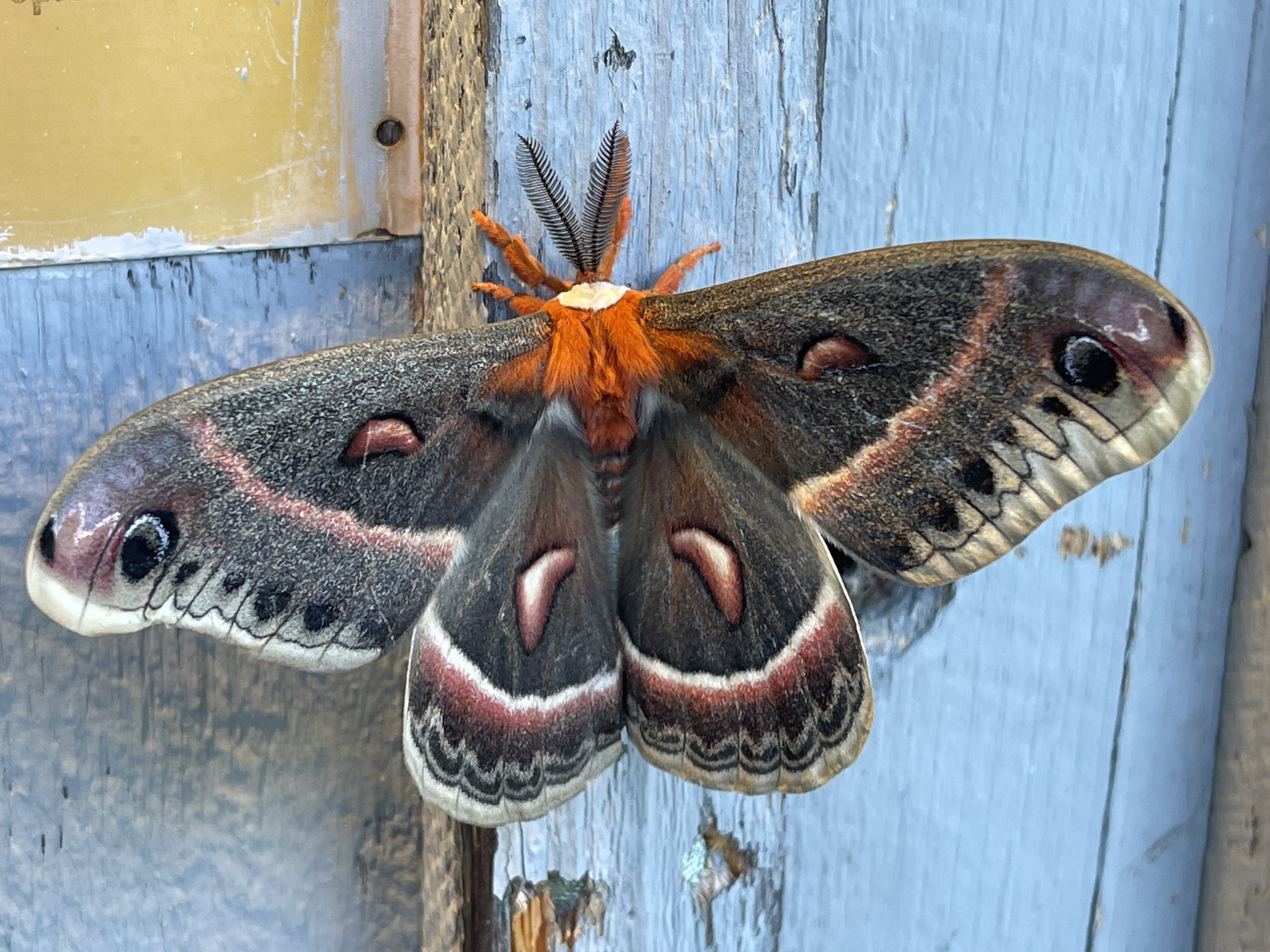
Adult male, White Mountain National Forest, New Hampshire
