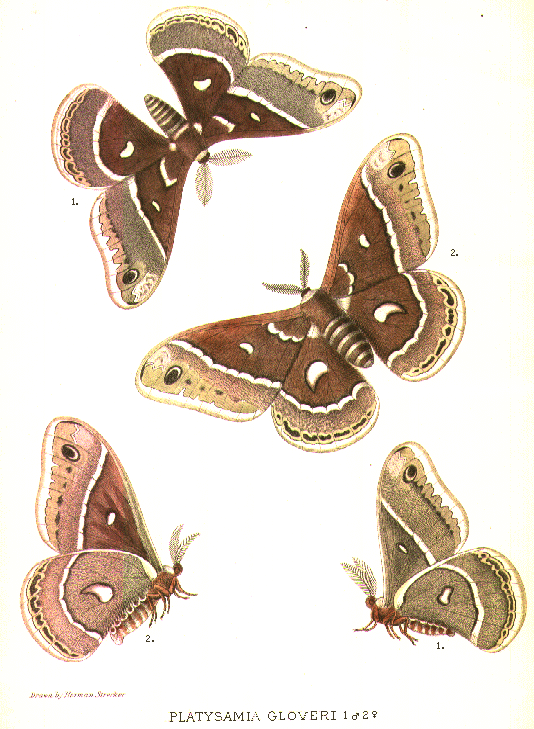

Scientific classification
- Domain: Eukaryota
- Kingdom: Animalia
- Phylum: Arthropoda
- Class: Insecta
- Order: Lepidoptera
- Family: Saturniidae
- Genus: Hyalophora
- Species: H. gloveri

Binomial name
- Hyalophora gloveri Strecker, 1872

Synonyms
- Platysamia gloveri; Hyalophora columbia gloveri

= Hyalophora gloveri =

Glover's silkmoth

Species of moth

Hyalophora gloveri, or Glover's silkmoth, is a moth of the family Saturniidae. The species was first described by Ferdinand Heinrich Hermann Strecker in 1872. It is found in the Rocky Mountain states, the western parts of the northern Great Plains, and the Canadian prairie provinces, north-west to at least central Alberta. It is also found in northern Mexico.

It is considered a subspecies of Hyalophora columbia by several authorities.

The wingspan is about 100 mm.

The larvae feed on Shepherdia argentea, Elaeagnus angustifolia, Salix species, etc.

== Subspecies ==
- Hyalophora gloveri gloveri
- Hyalophora gloveri nokomis
