= Distant Hill Gardens and Nature Trail =

Protected area, New Hampshire, US

Coordinates: 43°5′1″N 72°21′52″W

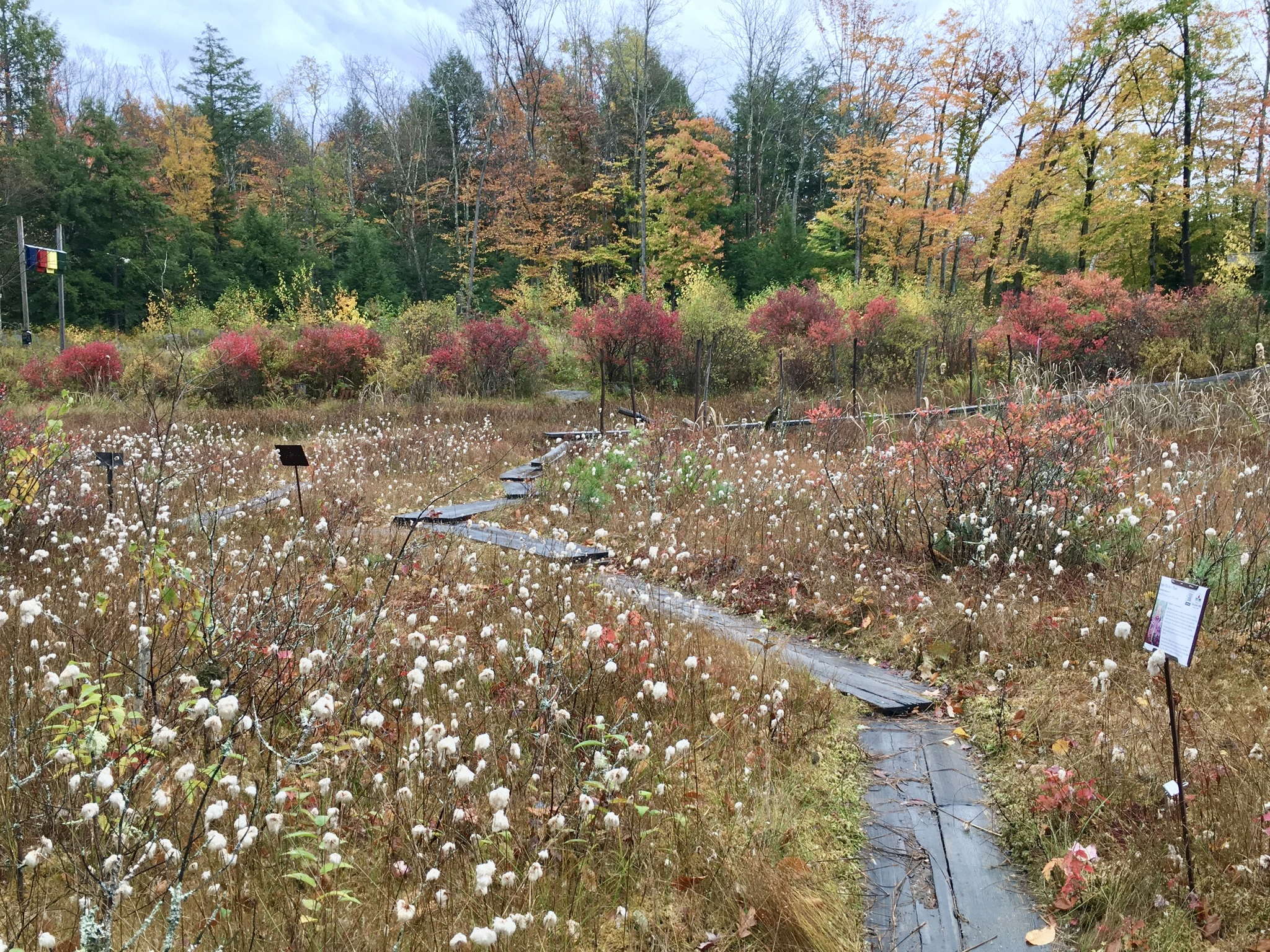
Tawny cottongrass and highbush blueberries, bog garden, Distant Hill

Distant Hill Gardens and Nature Trail is a privately owned 155-acre (63 ha) wildlife garden in New Hampshire, United States. The property is protected by a conservation easement. Features include a stone circle, outdoor sculptures, "450 varieties of labeled plants, a managed forest, a milkweed meadow, a pollinator meadow, a cranberry bog, a restored sugarbush, and 11 vernal pools. There's also a mile-long wheelchair and stroller-accessible trail, a beaver pond, more than 30 species of native trees and 150 acres of forest." Located in Cheshire County, within the towns of Walpole and Alstead, the gardens were built by married couple Michael and Kathy Nerrie, who first moved to what was then a 21-acre (8.5 ha) parcel in the 1970s as "back-to-the-landers." Michael Nerrie created the found-material sculptures that dot the property. They first opened Distant Hill to tourists and school groups in the 1990s. The property is accessible on selected weekends May through October.

== Gallery ==
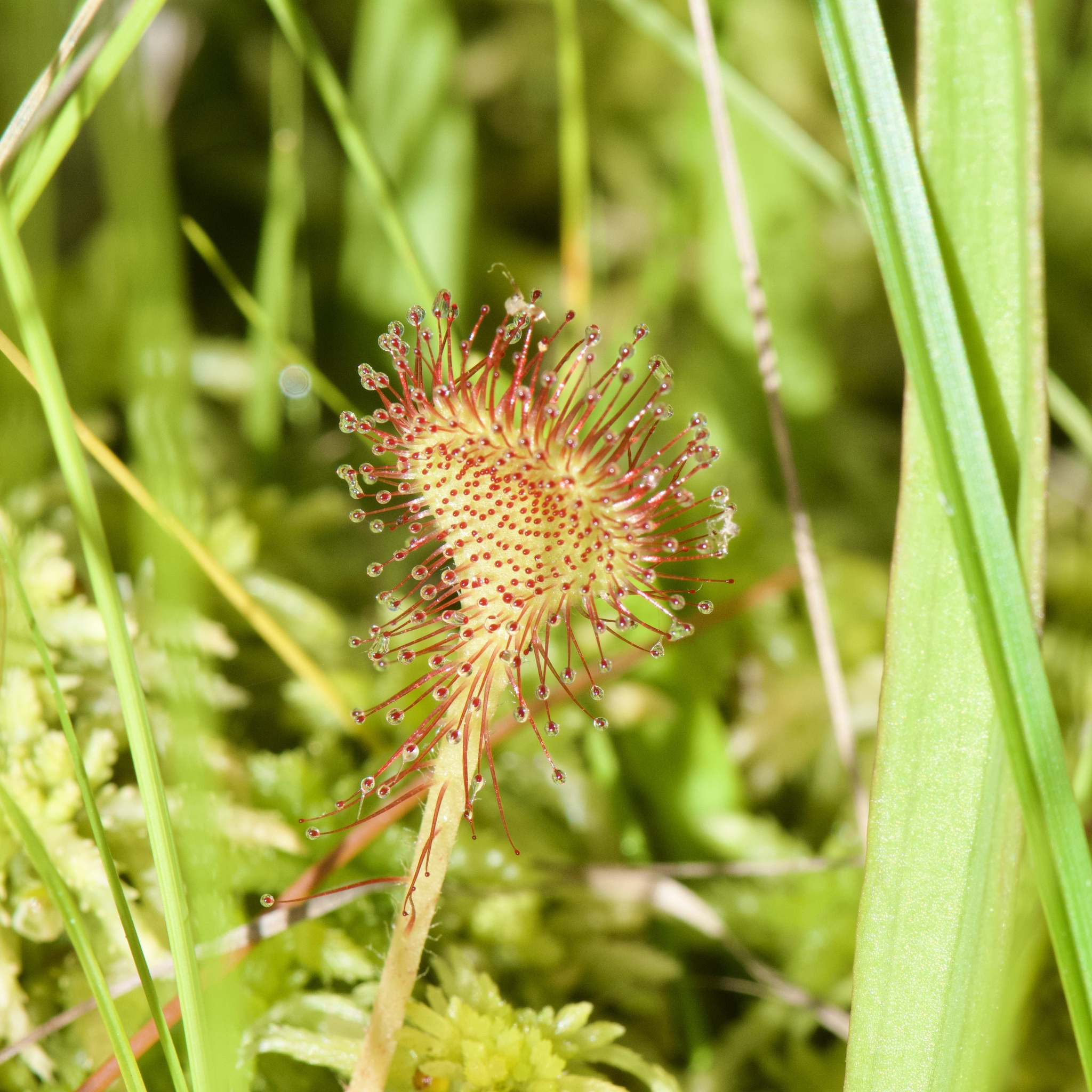
Drosera rotundifolia

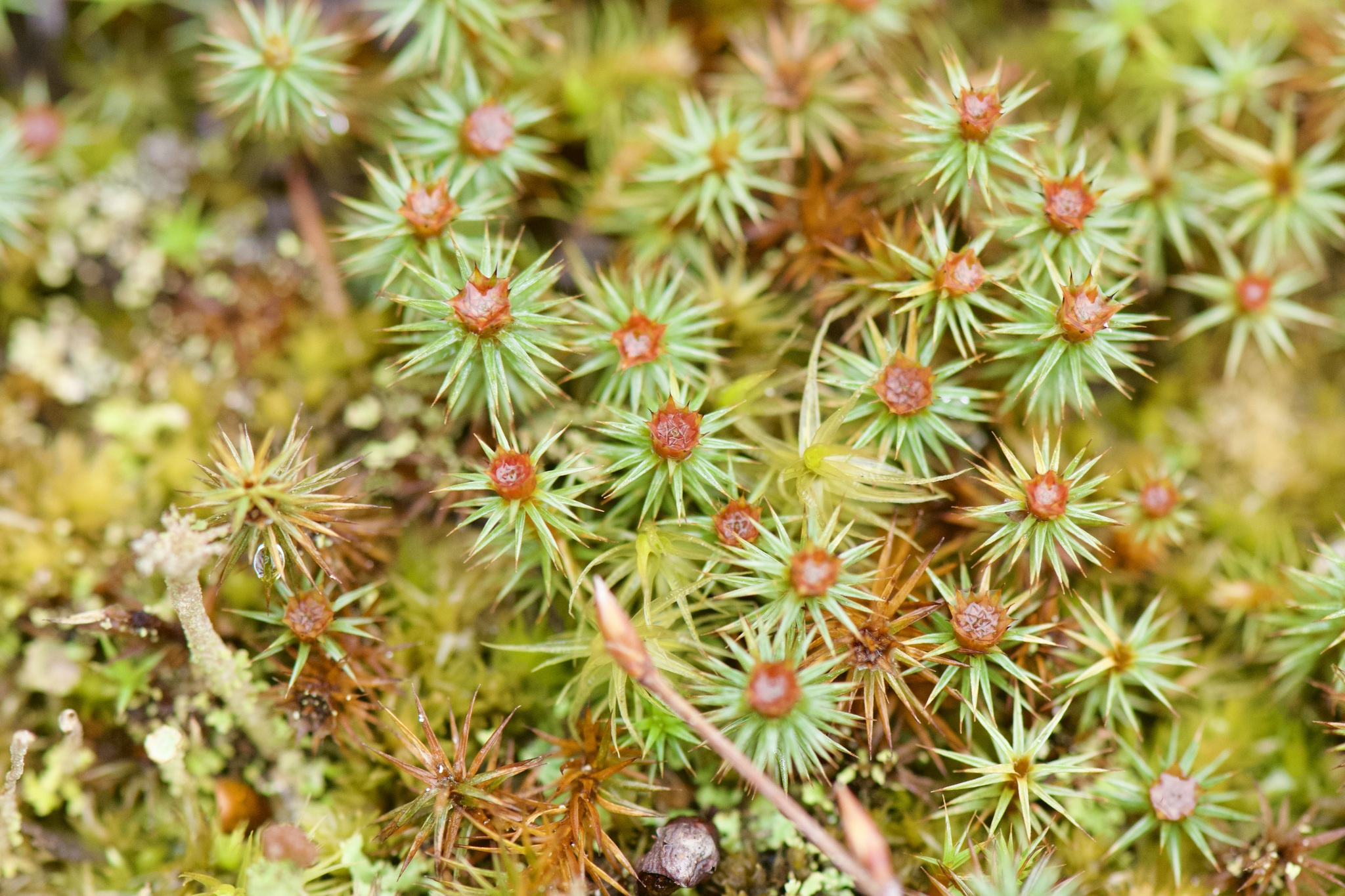
Polytrichum juniperinum

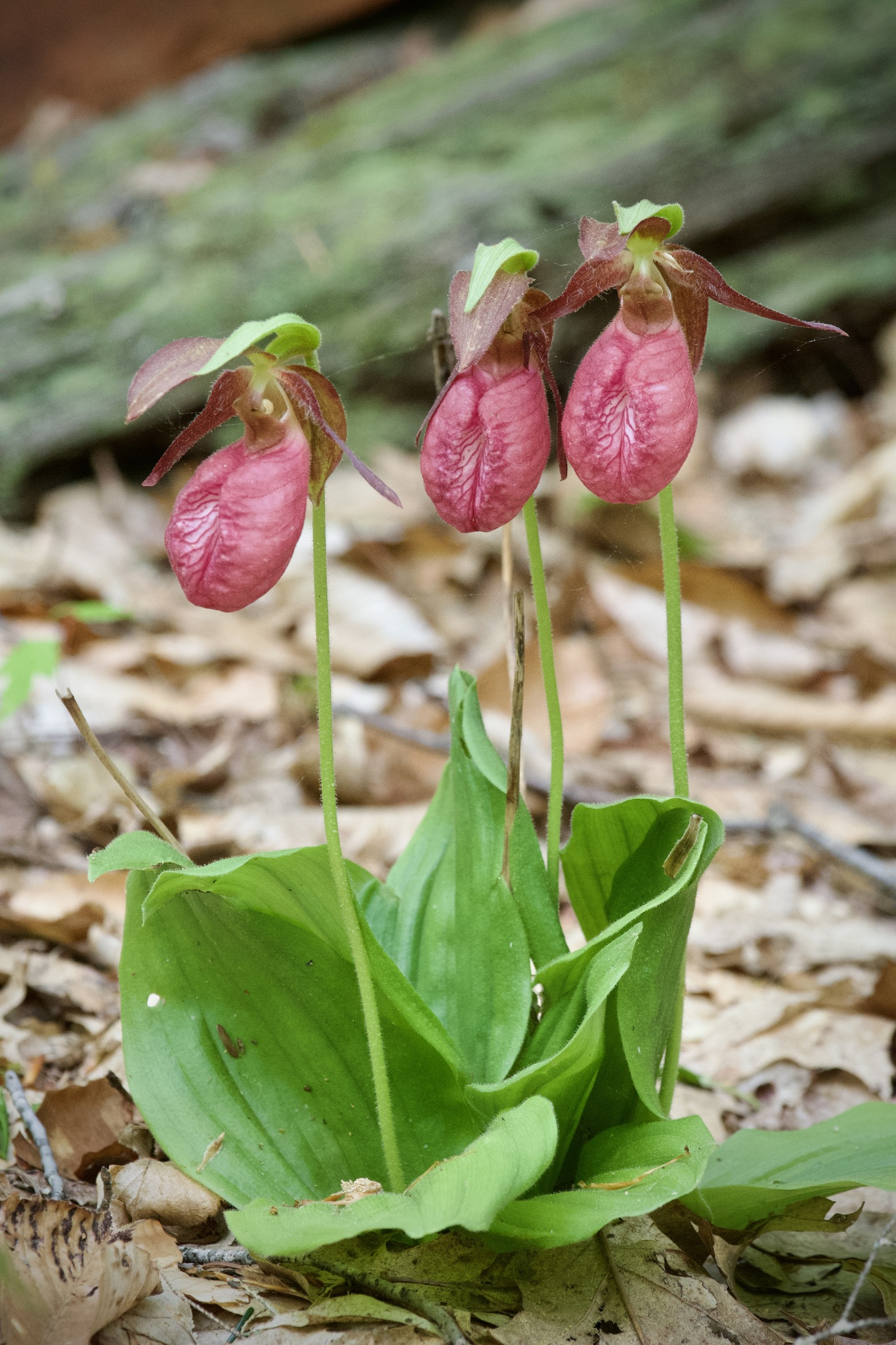
Cypripedium acaule

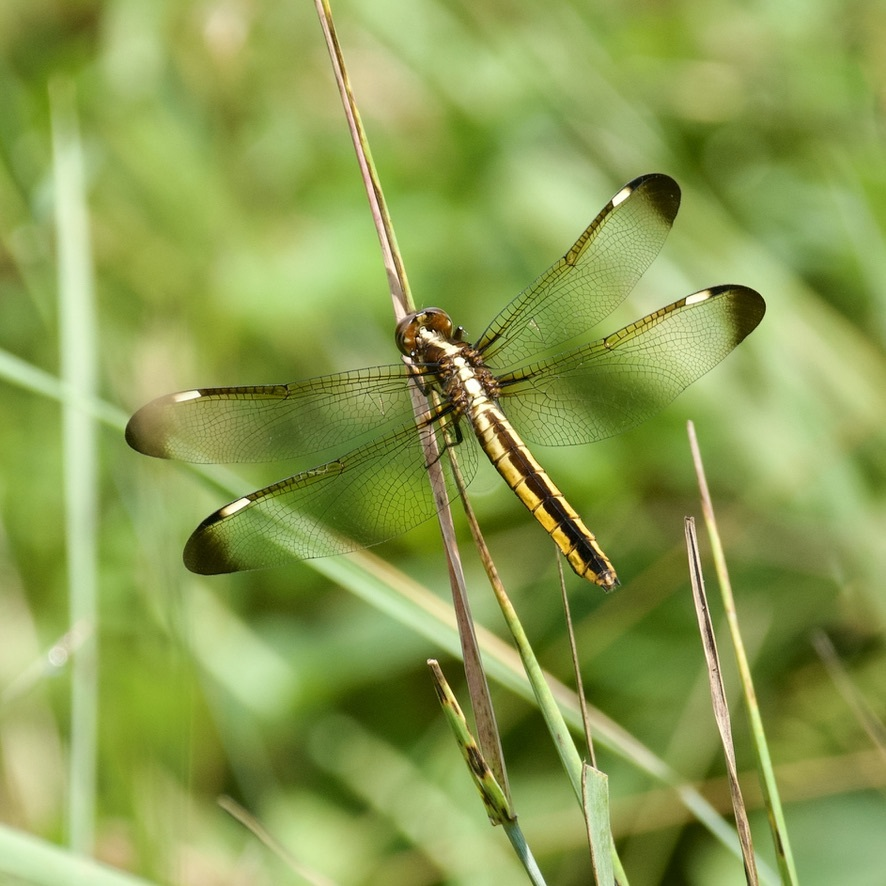
Libellula cyanea

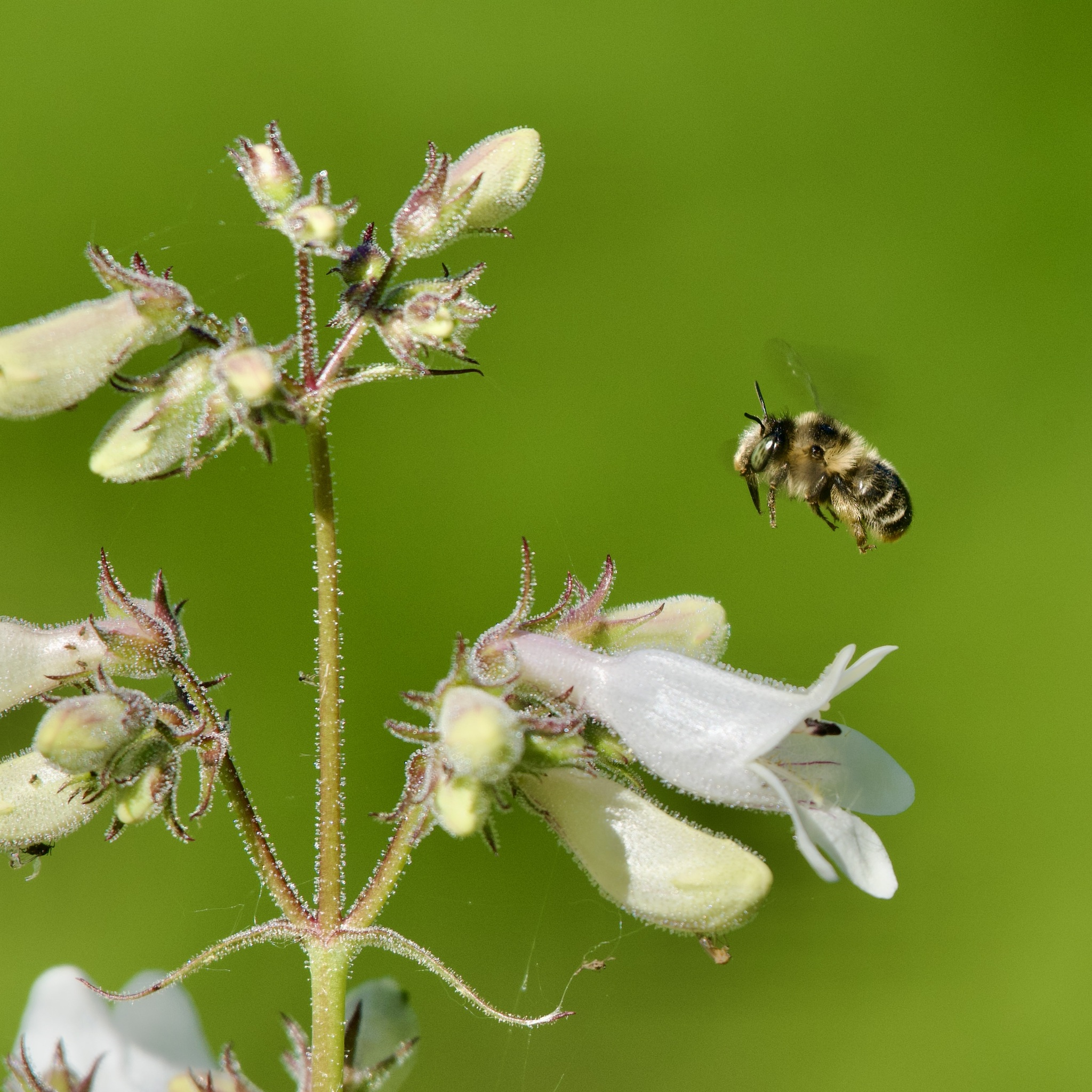
Anthophora terminalis

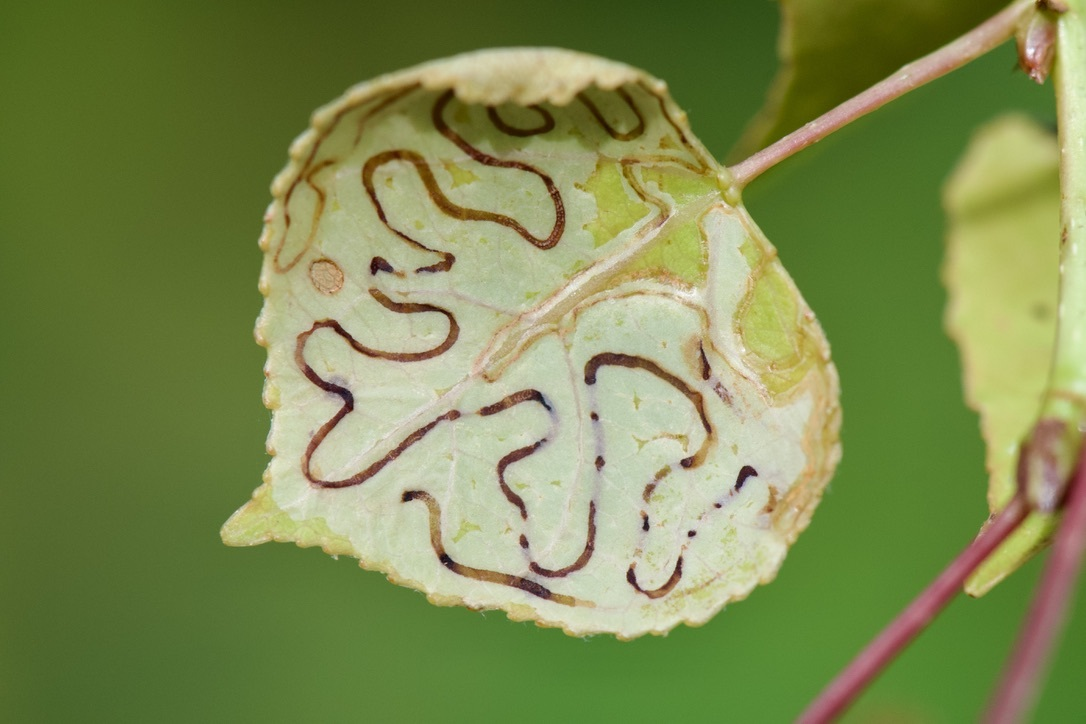
Phyllocnistis populiella

== See also ==
- Bamberger Ranch Preserve, Texas
