= Pear (disambiguation) =

A pear is a tree of the genus Pyrus and the fruit of that tree, edible in some species.

Pear or Pears may also refer to:

== Arts, entertainment, and media ==
- Pear (Annoying Orange), a character in Annoying Orange
- Pears' Cyclopaedia, a one-volume encyclopædia published in the United Kingdom

== Brands and enterprises ==
- Pear (company), a sponsorship and fundraising company
- Pears (soap), a British brand of soap
- Worcestershire County Cricket Club, traditionally nicknamed the "Pears", based on their badge of a pear tree or three black pears
- Fisker Pear, a cancelled battery electric compact crossover SUV

== Colors and shapes ==
- Pear (color), a shade of green
- Pear, a human female body shape

== Cultures ==
- Pear language, an endangered Mon-Khmer language of Cambodia
- Pear people, an indigenous group in Cambodia and Thailand

== Food and taxonomy ==
- Prickly pear (disambiguation)
  - Opuntia ficus-indica
- Pyrus (disambiguation)
- Avocado, a fruit that is referred to as "alligator pear" in certain countries
- Vegetable pear, a fruit mostly called chayote

== Places ==
- Pear (Užice), a village in the vicinity of Užice, Serbia
- Pear, West Virginia, an unincorporated community in the United States

== Science and technology ==
- PearPC, an open-source PowerPC emulator
- PHP Extension and Application Repository (PEAR), a computer programming framework and distribution system for PHP code components
- Polymerase-endonuclease amplification reaction (PEAR)
- Princeton Engineering Anomalies Research Lab (PEAR), a now disbanded program which attempted to study the paranormal

== Other uses ==
- Pears (surname)
- Pear Tree House, a civil defence control centre in London
- Choke pear (torture), or Pear of Anguish, an implement of torture
- Province de L'Eglise Anglicane au Rwanda (PEAR), the French name for the Anglican Church of Rwanda

== See also ==
- Choke pear (disambiguation)
- Pear-shaped (disambiguation)
