= Maguey flower =

Plant used in Mexican cuisine

Maguey flower

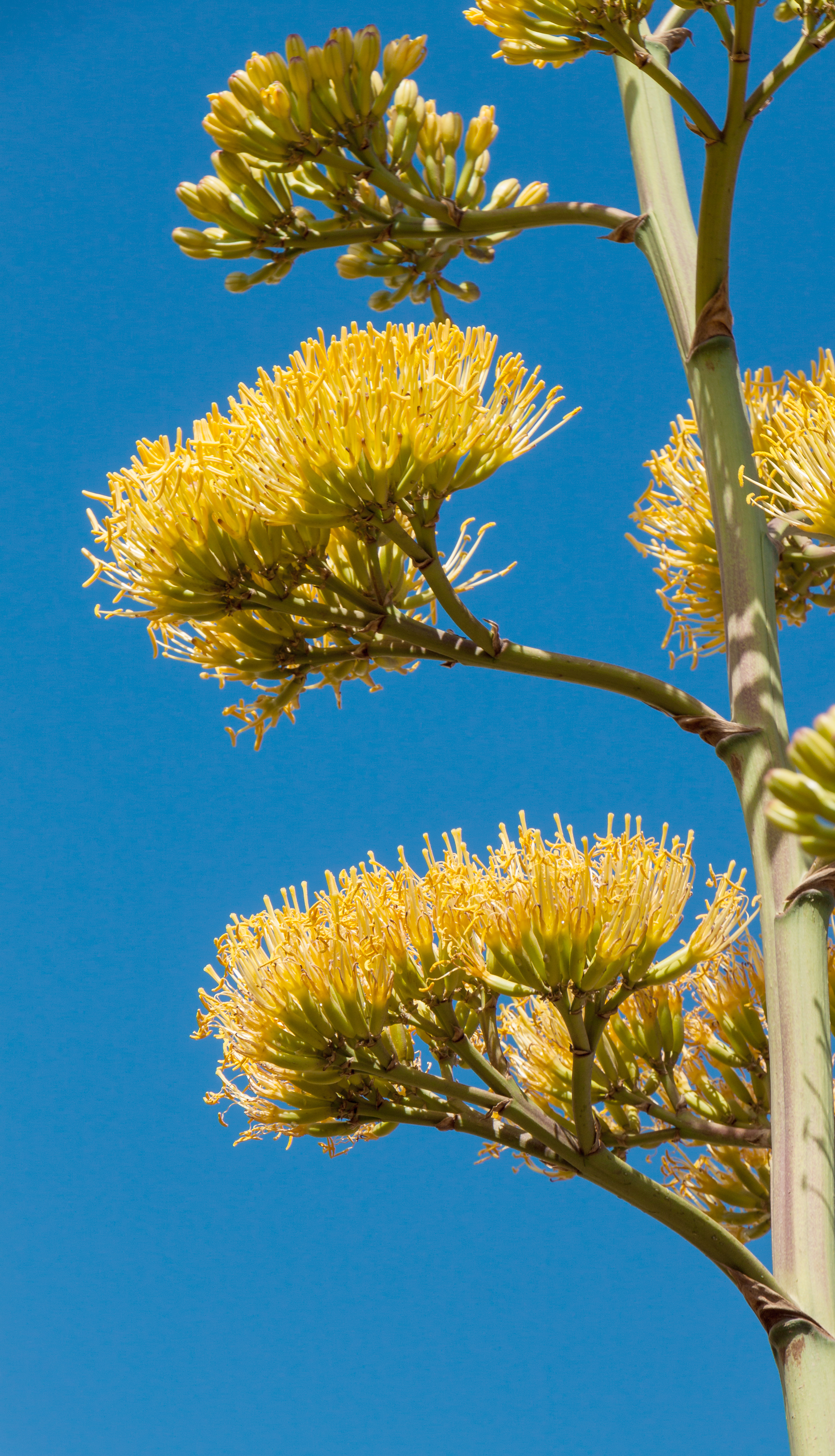
Open flower

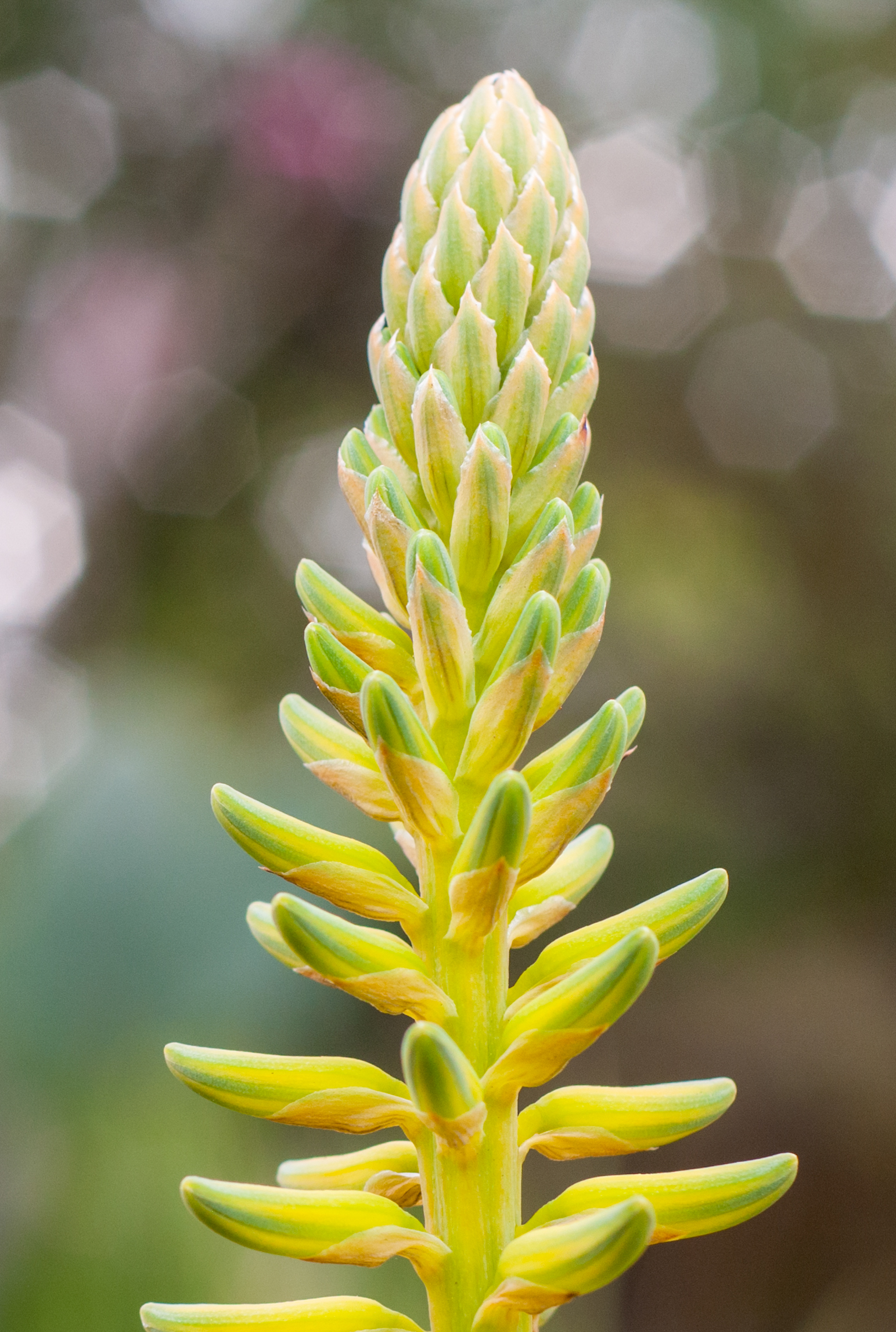
Closed flower

The maguey flower (Agave spp.), in Spanish, flor de maguey (Spanish pronunciation: [maˈɣej]), also known locally as gualumbo, hualumbo, quiote or jiote (Note: The term quiote or jiote (from the Nahuatl quiotl, "stem", "bud") refers mainly to the vigorous edible stem that grows from the center of the plant when it ripes. However, the maguey flower can also be called, by extension, quiote. The term is also used as a verb: it is said that when a maguey ripes, it has "quioted" (ha quiotado). Further reading: García, P. (2020)) is a typical product of Mexican cuisine, cultivated mainly in the rural areas of the center of the country. It is rare enough to be considered a delicacy. Some preparation is needed to eliminate the bitterness.

== Description ==
The maguey or agave plant (metl in Nahuatl) is one of the most appreciated quelites in Mexican cuisine. All its parts are used from this plant: the fiber, the sap, the flowers, the stem (quiote) and even the fungi and worms that live in it. There are 159 species of maguey all over Mexico, although the most important are Agave americana, A. atrovirens, A. mapisaga and A. salmiana.

The plant blooms once it reaches its peak ripening stage, between 7 and 15 years of age. The enormous stem sprouts from its center, which can reach up to 10 metres (33 ft). The maguey only blooms once in its entire life. After that, it dies.

The maguey flowers are greenish-yellow, elongated in appearance (about 10 centimetres or 4 inches). Each flower has 6 petals and inside, 3 pistils with flattened seeds.

== Ecology ==
The nectar of the maguey flowers serves as food for migratory bat species. For this reason, it is important not only to collect maguey flowers, but to plant new plants, to avoid endangering the food life cycle of these bats.

== Uses ==
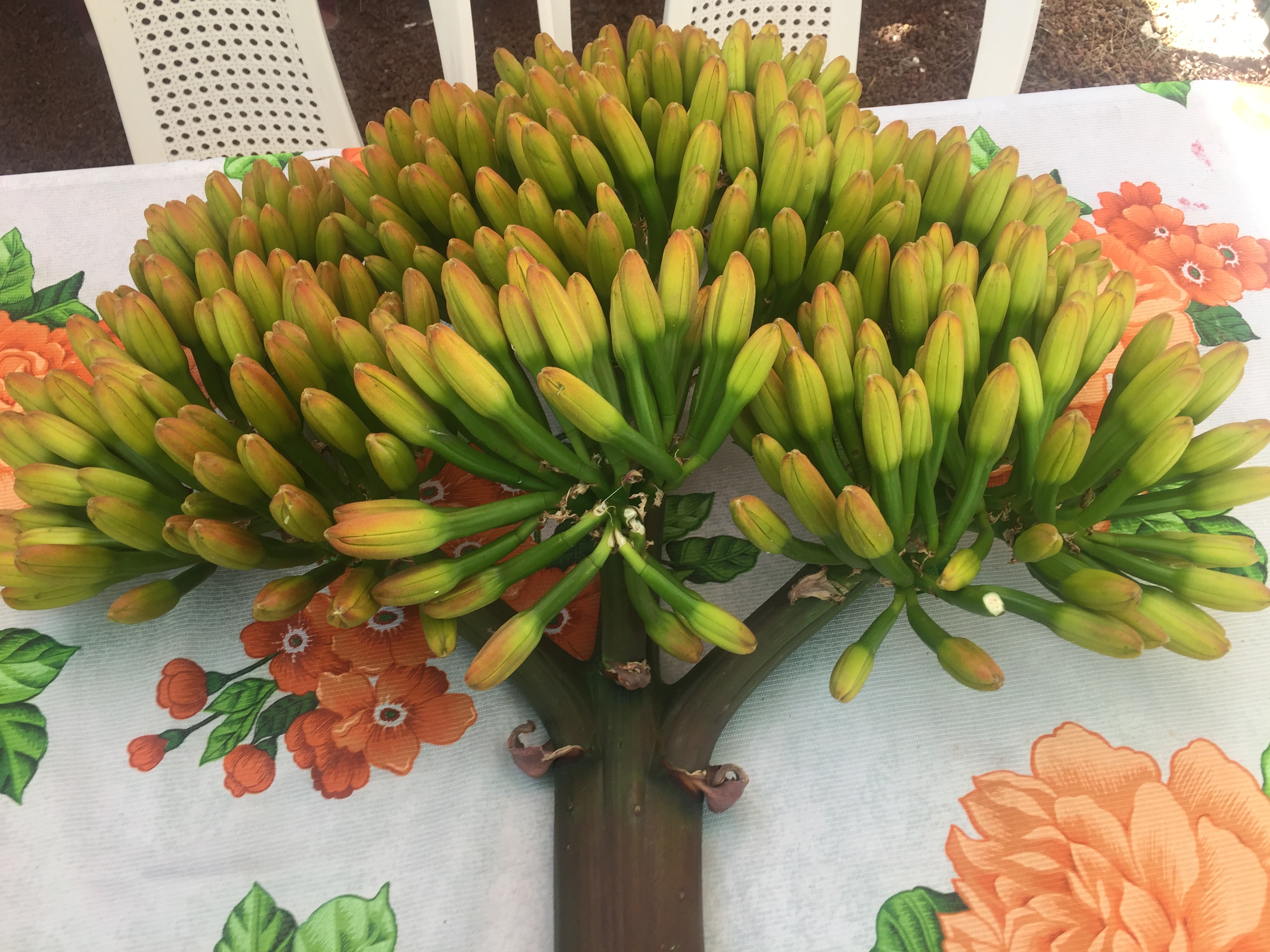
Freshly cut bunch of quiotes, jiotes or gualumbos (maguey flowers).

As the maguey only blooms once in its life, the indigenous peoples of Mexico do not extract all the flowers from them, as an act of respect for the plant that feeds them. To extract the flowers from the maguey, it is not necessary to tear down the stem; a high ladder can be used. In this process, it is important to damage the vegetable as little as possible.

The maguey flower is eaten in the central states of the country, particularly the State of Mexico, Hidalgo, Nayarit, Morelos, Puebla and Tlaxcala. Finding maguey flowers is not an easy task. Although they are generally sold in fresh bunches in local markets, most of the harvested flowers are for personal consumption. They can also be found canned in brine in some gourmet stores.

=== Culinary ===
Both the stem and the flower are edible. Due to its difficult availability, the flower is considered a delicacy. Maguey flowers are harvested and consumed closed (when they have not yet flowered), since once opened (ripened), they have a bitter taste.

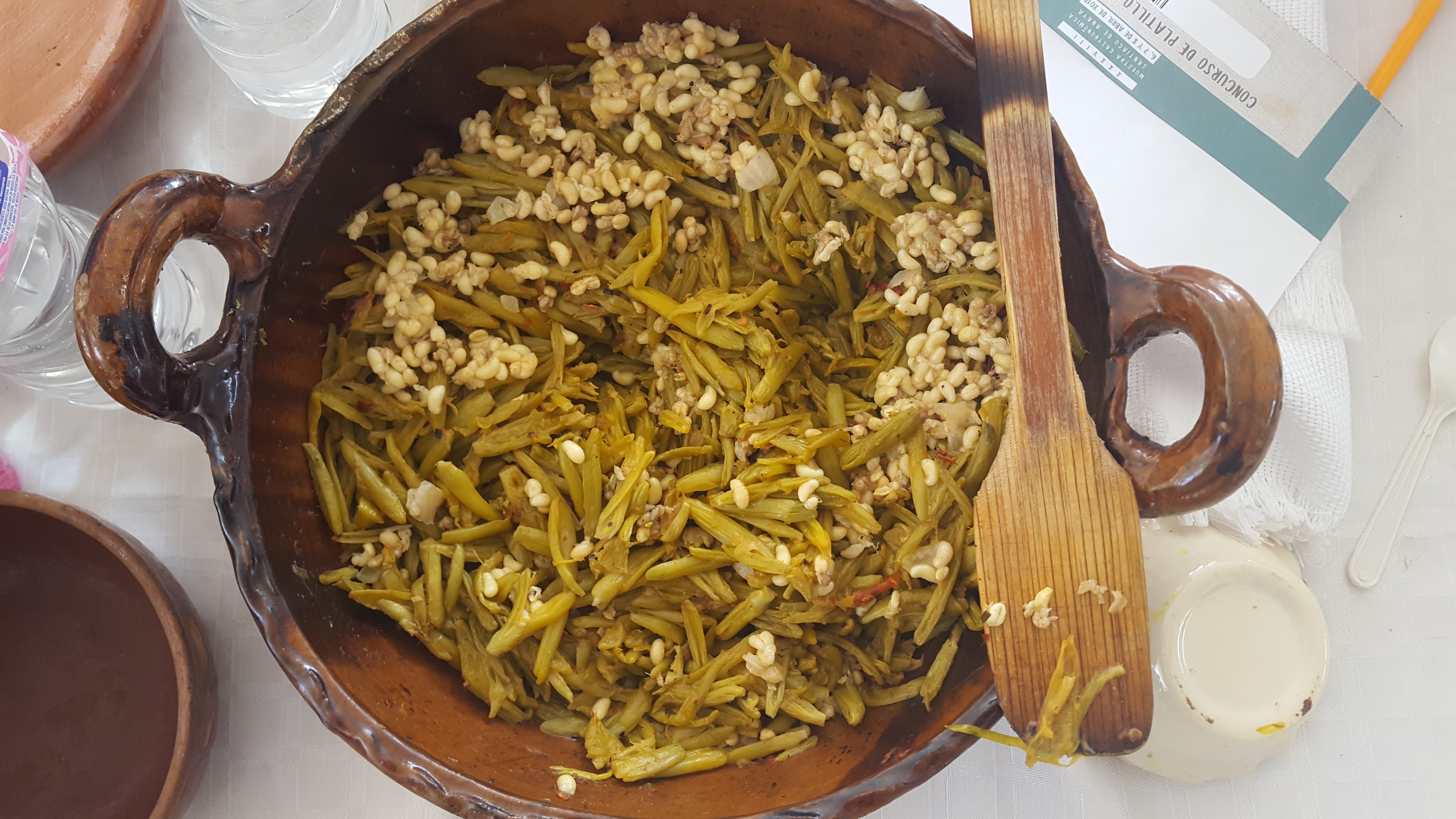
Stew of gualumbos and escamoles

Due to their bitter taste, it is recommended to "deflam" (desflemar) the flowers (meaning "soften the flavor") by boiling them in salted water. But first, the stems and pistils should be removed, since these would make the stew bitter and are hard to eat. Only the petals are eaten. It is considered a laborious task, requiring some time. The flavor of maguey flowers has been compared to chicken meat, and it is actually considered a substitute for meat.

Gualumbos are considered as a versatile culinary product, they are often prepared roasted (tatemado), fried with onion and chili, stewed with carnitas, coated in batter (capeado), in papillote (mixiote), filled with white cheese, scrambled with eggs, as a filler for tortitas, bathed in green sauce, or cooked a la mexicana.

In stews, it can be combined with other vegetables (tomato, onion, garlic), meat or longaniza. While cooking, the stew should be covered so that the flowers remain juicy, stirring it every so often. When the flowers change its color to a dark green, they will be ready to be served, and they will give off a unique aroma.

It is traditional to eat maguey flowers during Christian Lent, because it coincides with the flowering stage.

== See also ==
- Maguey syrup
- Mezcal, distilled beverage from maguey
- Pulque, fermented beverage from maguey
- Quelite
- Squash blossom or courgette flowers
