= Pero, Lombardy =

Pero Per (Lombard)
- Comune
- Comune di Pero
- Coat of arms

- Location within Italy Location within Lombardy
- Coordinates: 45°31′N 9°5′E
- Country: Italy
- Region: Lombardy
- Metropolitan city: Milan (MI)
- Frazioni: Cerchiate, Cerchiarello

Area
  - Total: 5.0 km^{2} (1.9 sq mi)
- Elevation: 144 m (472 ft)

Population (Dec. 2004)
  - Total: 10,378
  - Density: 2,100/km^{2} (5,400/sq mi)
- Demonym: Peresi
- Time zone: UTC+1 (CET)
  - Summer (DST): UTC+2 (CEST)
- Postal code: 20016
- Dialing code: 02
- Website: Official website

Pero (Milanese: Per [ˈpeːr]) is a comune (municipality) in the Province of Milan in the Italian region Lombardy, located about 9 kilometres (6 mi) northwest of Milan. As of 31 December 2004, it had a population of 10,378 and an area of 5.0 square kilometres (1.9 mi^{2}).

The municipality of Pero contains the frazioni (subdivisions, mainly villages and hamlets) Cerchiate and Cerchiarello.

It's existence is first mentioned in a document from 962 as Cassina del Pero, which also references the presence of vineyards in the area. Cassina, Lombard variant of cascina, means "large farmhouse".

Pero borders the following municipalities: Rho, Milan.

Pero is linked to Milan and Rho by the underground line M1 (a.k.a. "red line").

== Demographic evolution ==
Historical population

Year	Pop.	±%
1861	488	—
1871	602	+23.4%
1881	658	+9.3%
1901	783	+19.0%
1911	959	+22.5%

Year	Pop.	±%
1921	937	−2.3%
1931	2,002	+113.7%
1936	2,107	+5.2%
1951	2,614	+24.1%
1961	6,370	+143.7%

Year	Pop.	±%
1971	10,030	+57.5%
1981	10,781	+7.5%
1991	10,667	−1.1%
2001	10,373	−2.8%

Source: Data from ISTAT

== Twin towns ==
Pero is twinned with:

- Fuscaldo, Italy
- Pear, West Virginia, United States
