= Choke pear =

Choke pear may refer to:

- Choke pear (plant), any variety of astringent pear fruit
- Pear of anguish, a device found in some museums
