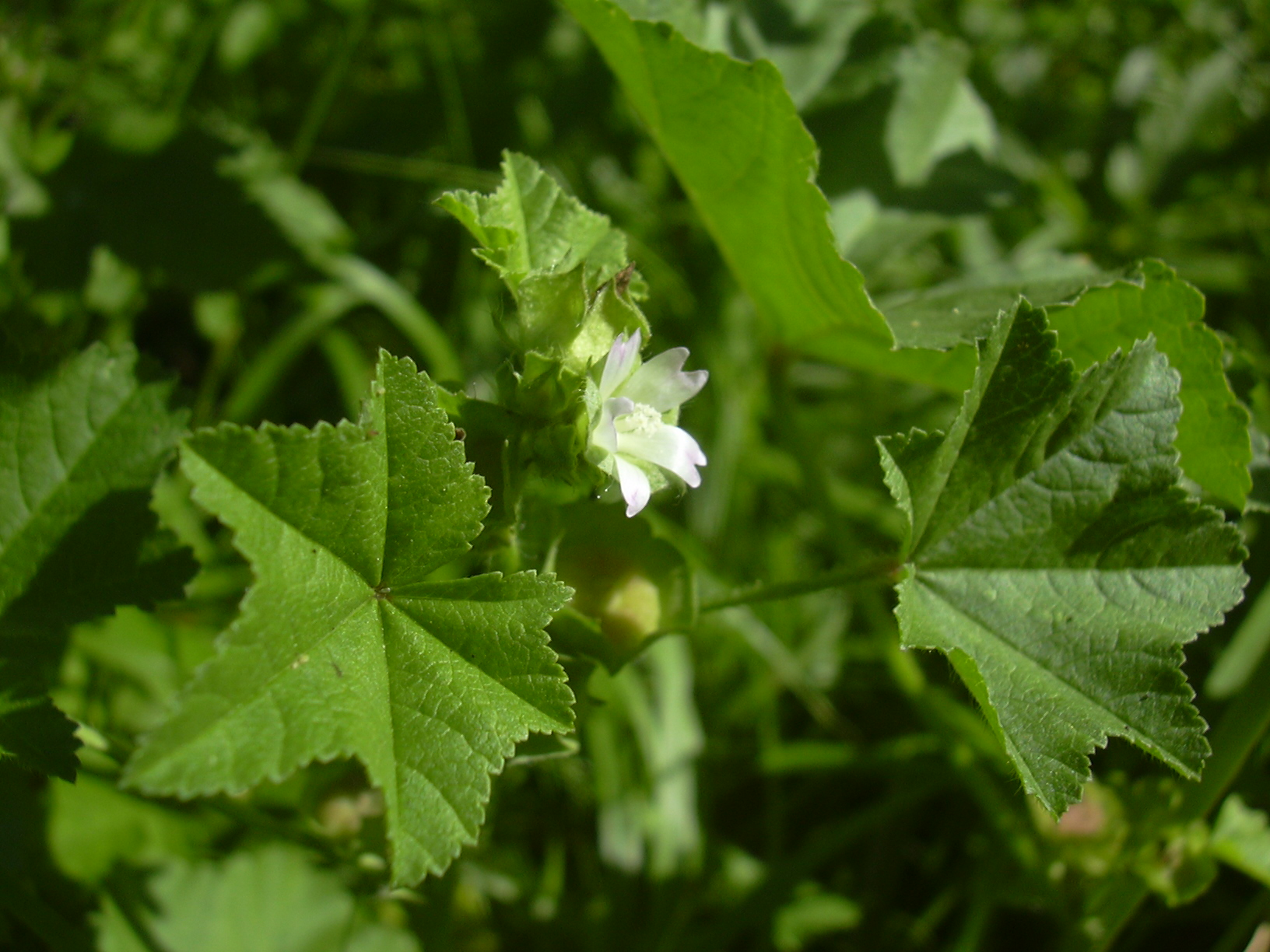

Scientific classification
- Kingdom: Plantae
- Clade: Tracheophytes
- Clade: Angiosperms
- Clade: Eudicots
- Clade: Rosids
- Order: Malvales
- Family: Malvaceae
- Genus: Malva
- Species: M. parviflora

Binomial name
- Malva parviflora L.

Synonyms
- List: Malva flexuosa Hornem.; Malva microcarpa Pers.; Malva microcalyx C.A.Mey.; Malva musiana Sennen; Malva mareotica Delile ex DC.; Malva coronata Pomel; Malva bivoniana C.Presl; Malva polycarpa Sennen; Malva trionoides DC.; Malva simpliciuscula Steud.; Althaea mareotica Alef.; Althaea microcarpa Alef.; Althaea parviflora Alef.; Malva heterocarpa Shuttlew.

= Malva parviflora =

Species of flowering plant

Malva parviflora is an annual or perennial herb that is native to Northern Africa, Southern Europe, and Western and Central Asia and is widely naturalized elsewhere. Common names include cheeseweed, cheeseweed mallow, Egyptian mallow, least mallow, little mallow, mallow, marshmallow, small-flowered mallow, small-flowered marshmallow, and smallflower mallow. It is used in traditional medicine.

== Description ==
M. parviflora has a decumbent or erect habit, growing up to 50–80 cm in height. The broad leaves have 5–7 shallow lobes and are 8–10 cm in diameter. The lobe edges are round-toothed, with varying hairiness. It has small white or pink flowers year-round at the base of leaf stalks; flowers have 4–10 mm long petals. The 2 mm seeds are reddish-brown and kidney-shaped.

Newly sprouted plants have hairless, heart-shaped cotyledons with long stalks. These cotyledons are 3–12 mm long and 3–8 mm wide. Stalks usually do have hairs. The first leaf is rounder and larger than the others. True leaves are round and weakly lobed with wavy, shallow-toothed edges and a red spot at the leaf base. The plant rapidly grows a deep taproot.

M. parviflora has a diploid chromosome count of 42.

== Taxonomy ==
Malva parviflora was described by Carl Linnaeus and published in Demonstrationes Plantarum in Horto Upsaliensi MDCCLIII on October 3, 1753.

The genus name Malva is from the Latin word malva 'mallow'. Mallow was described by Pliny the Elder in his Naturalis Historia (20, LXXXIV). The species name parviflora means 'small-flowered' and is a compound of the Latin words parvus 'small' and flores 'flowers'.

=== Subspecies ===
Two subspecies are accepted.

- Malva parviflora var. parviflora – Mediterranean basin, Sahara, Macaronesia, Arabian Peninsula, and Western Asia to the Caucasus and Pakistan
- Malva parviflora var. velutina (J.A.Schmidt) A.Chev. – Cape Verde Islands (Santo Antão Island)

== Distribution and habitat ==
M. parviflora typically grows on agricultural lands and in disturbed sites such as roadsides. Its native range extends from the Mediterranean, through West Asia, and to Central Asia and can be found in Algeria, Egypt, Libya, Morocco, Tunisia, Kuwait, Afghanistan, Cyprus, Iran, Israel, Jordan, Lebanon, Syria, Turkey, Armenia, Azerbaijan, Turkmenistan, Albania, Bosnia and Herzegovina, Greece, Croatia, Italy, Malta, Spain, France, and Portugal. The species is widely naturalized elsewhere, including in North America since the 19th century. It is a naturalized weed in Australia.

== Toxicity ==
M. parviflora accumulates pollutants such as cadmium and chromium. In nitrogen-rich soils, the plant's leaves and seeds can be toxic to cattle and poultry due to an accumulation of nitrates. If consumed in large amounts, the plant can damage energy homeostasis in horses, possibly due to its cyclopropene fatty acids.

== Uses ==
The entire plant is edible and can be eaten both raw and cooked. It has a mild flavor similar to chard and a mild, earthy aroma.

M. parviflora has been used in infusions, decoctions, and poultices as part of traditional medicine. In Mexico, M. parviflora is consumed as a quelite and used in traditional medicine to treat wounds and problems with digestion. In the 20th century, naturalist Alfonso Herrera Fernández noted that the dried leaves were used in moisturizing poultices and that the flowers were used in infusions to induce perspiration. Particularly in Zapotitlán, Puebla, the roots are used in infusions to treat dysentery. In Jordan, the leaves are used in infusions and poultices as an emollient, laxative, carminative, and anti-hemorrhoid. In Lebanon, the leaves are used in decoctions to treat catarrhs, kidney infections, kidney stones, respiratory infections, and constipation. In Ethiopia, the roots are used to treat asthma and wounds.

Few clinical trials have tested the efficacy of M. parviflora's traditional uses. Preclinical studies have found that extracts from various parts of the plant have antimicrobial and antifungal properties. However, this effect is usually weaker than that of standard antibiotics. The roots and leaves have antioxidant and anti-inflammatory properties. The plant may have an anti-diabetic effect, but the effect's strength is disputed. In mice, M. parviflora extracts have shown potential to treat hypertension and Alzheimer's.

== Botanical gallery ==
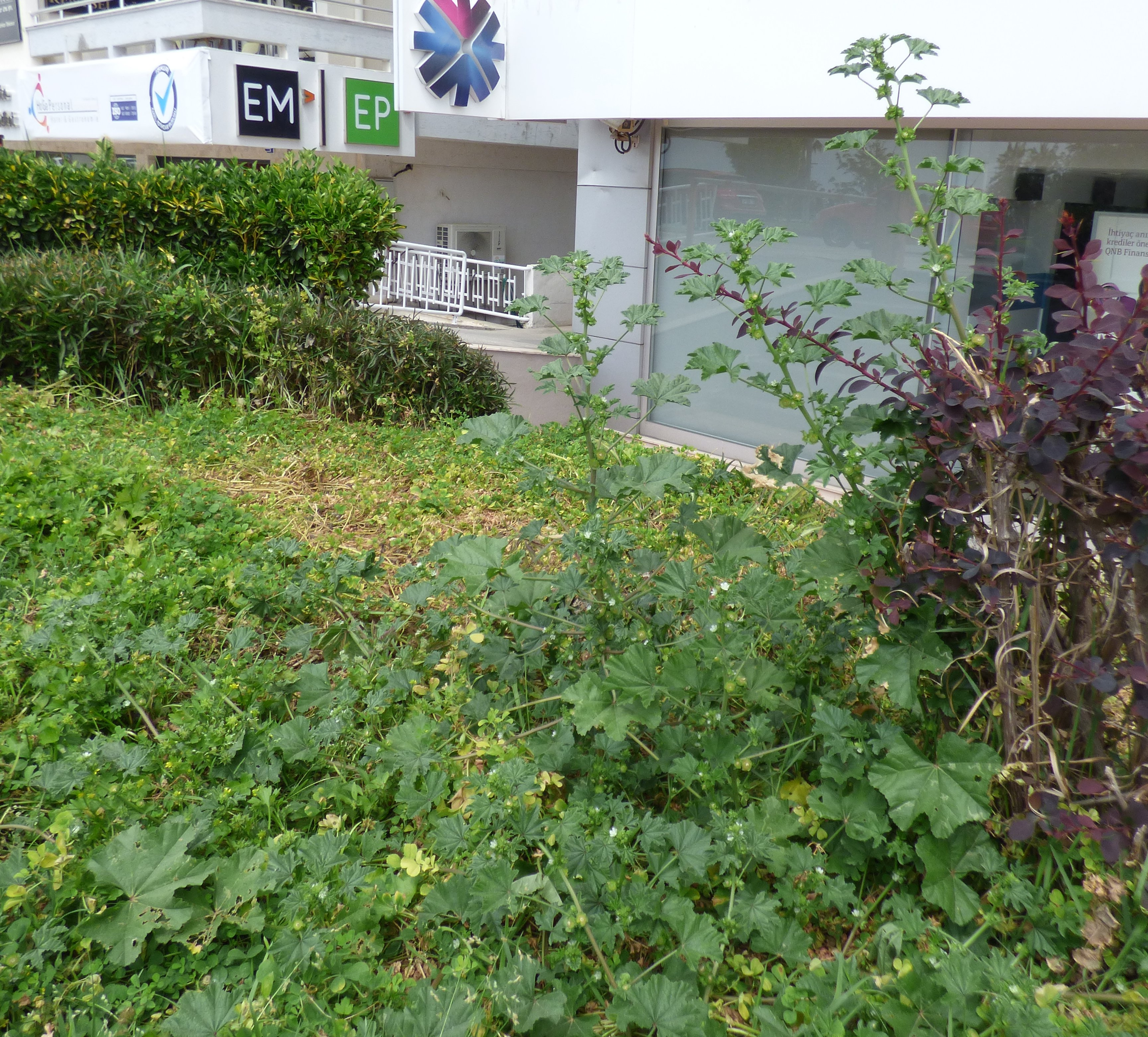
M. parviflora growing wild in Antalya, Turkey, demonstrating the large size it can grow to

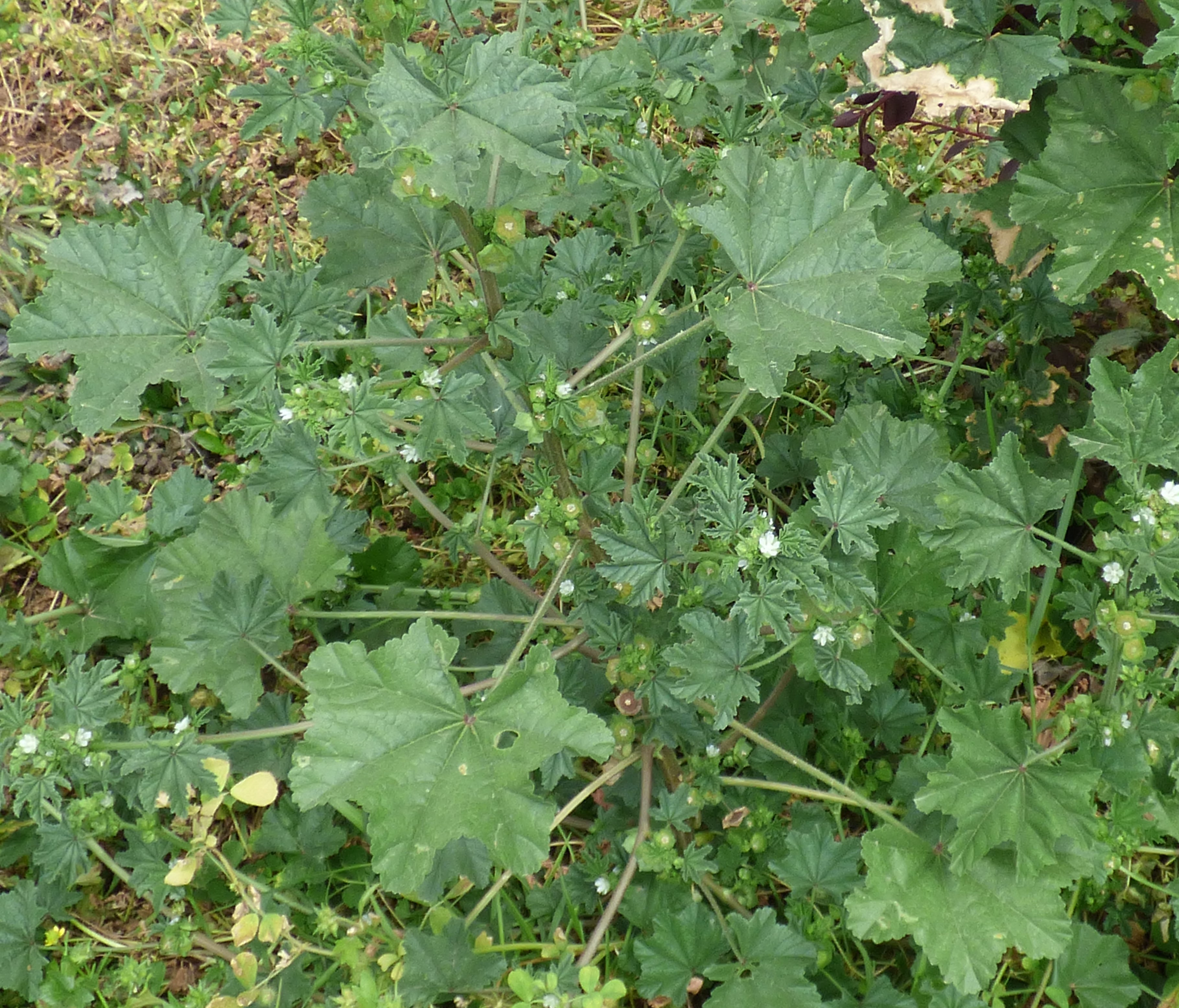
Plant from above showing leaves, flowers, fruits

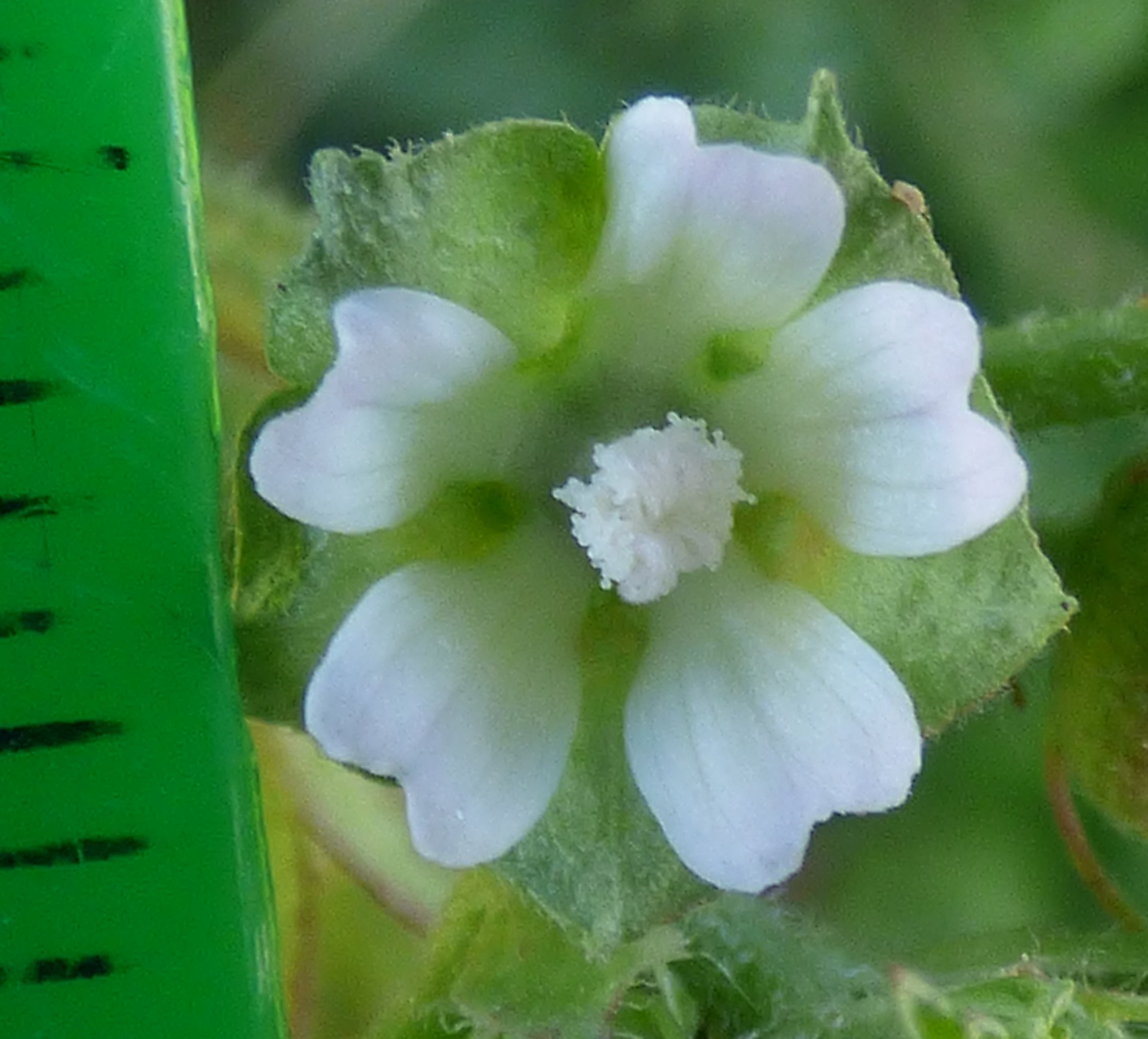
Flower white or pinky, petals gappy, approx same size as sepals, no hairs at petal bases

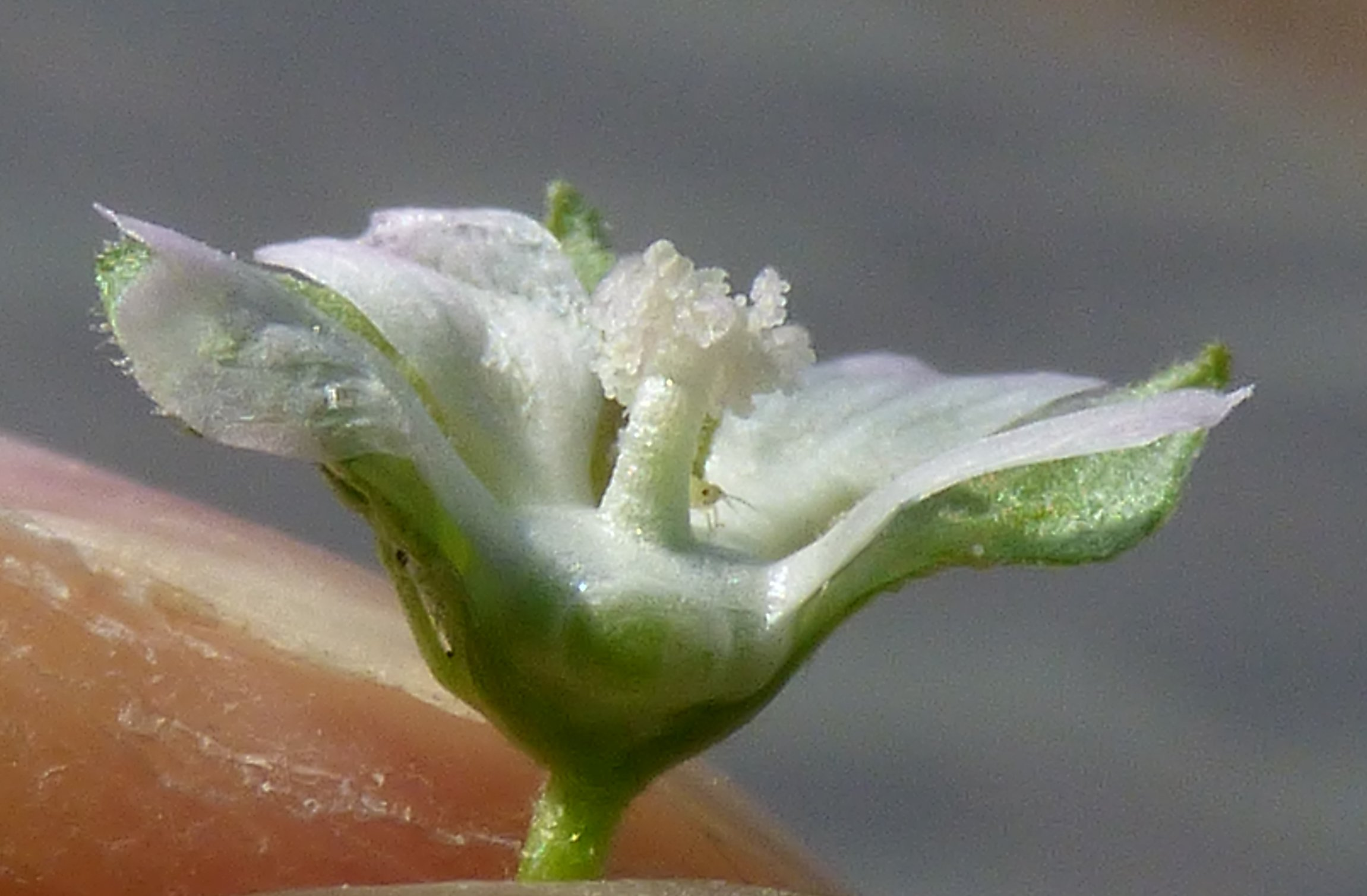
Flower within, showing staminal column and no petal hairs

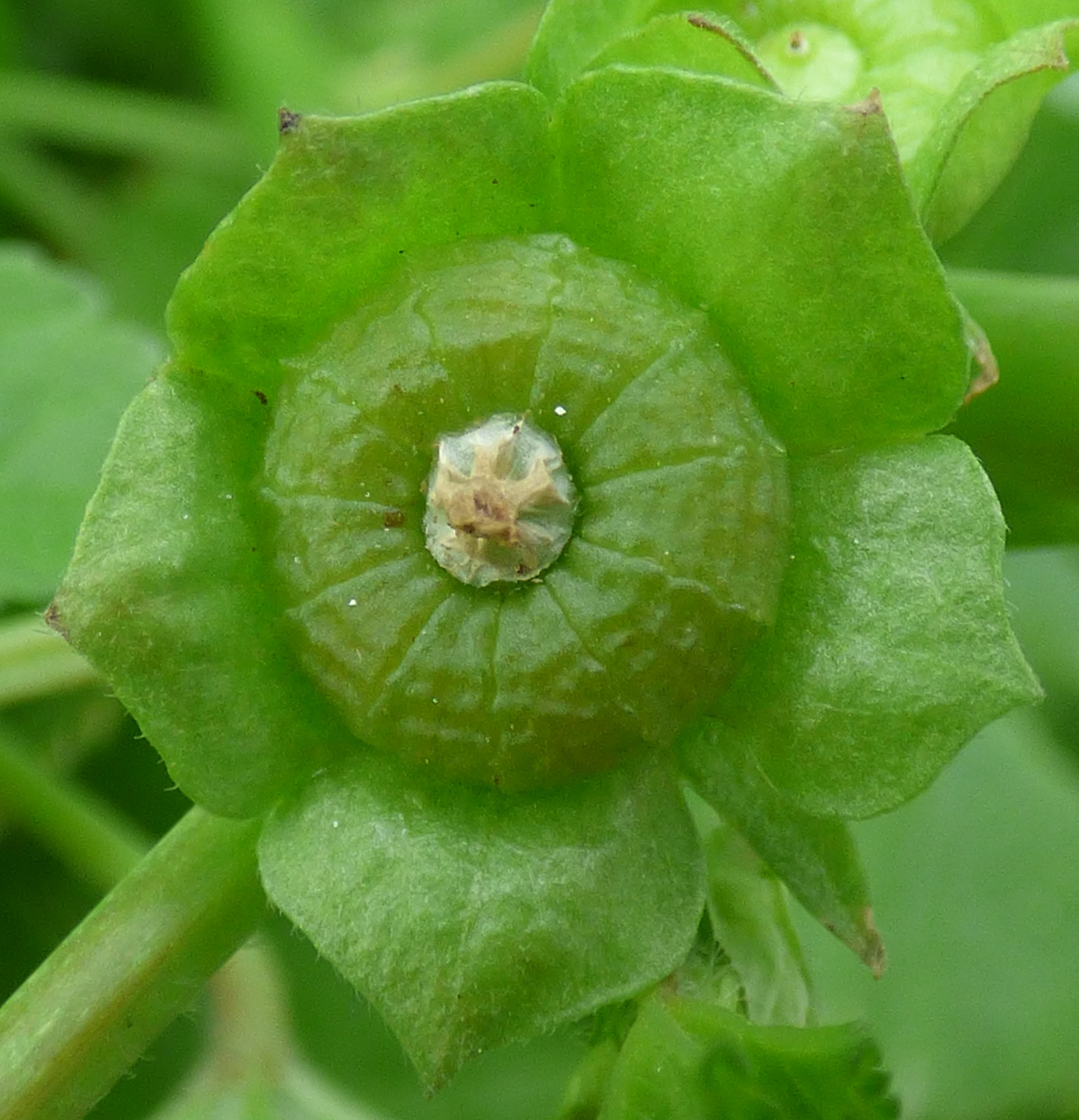
Maturing, 5-part sepals enlarge around like plate, fruit segments with wrinkled tops and wavy raised junctions (immature may look smooth)

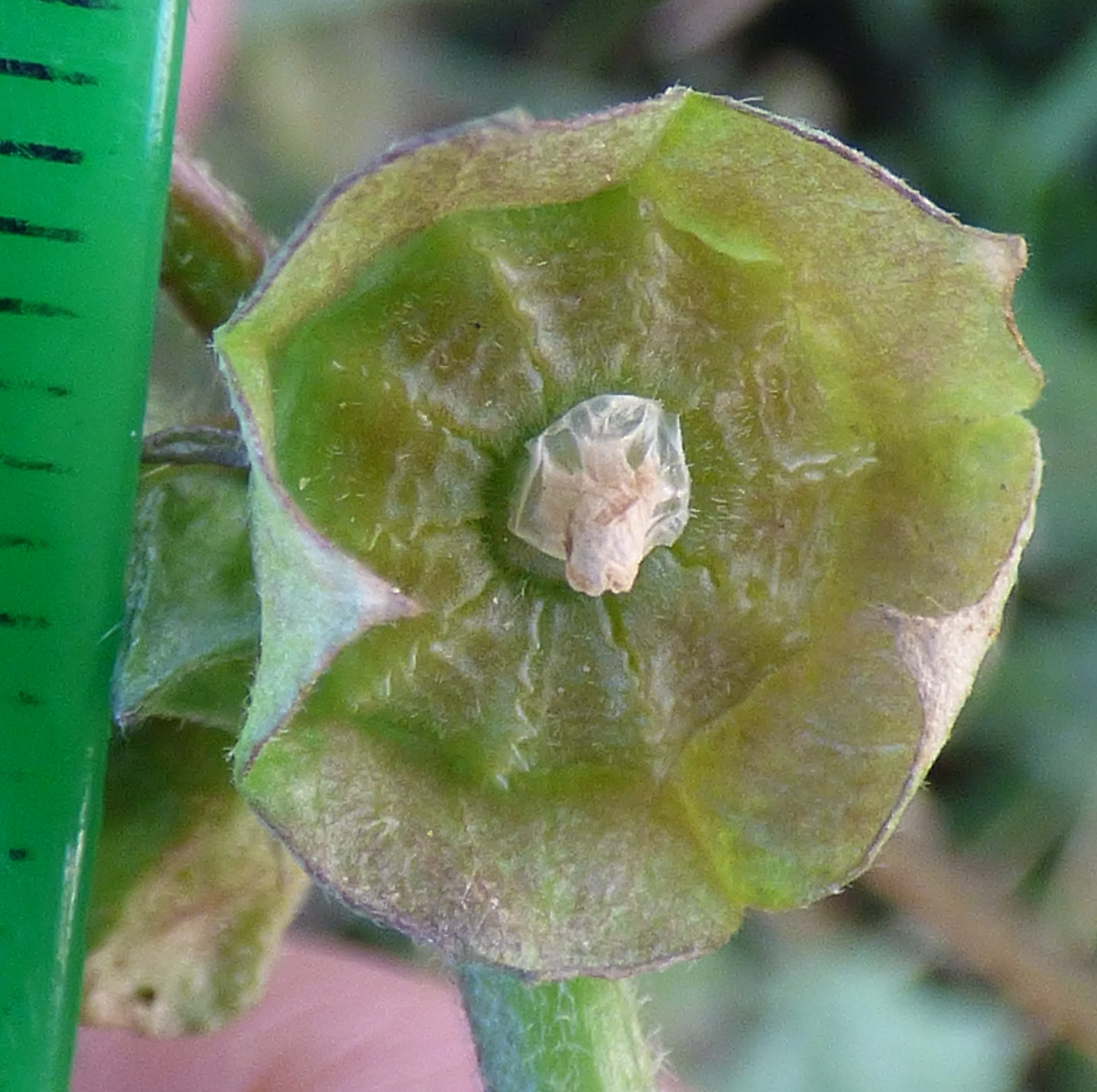
Fruit more mature

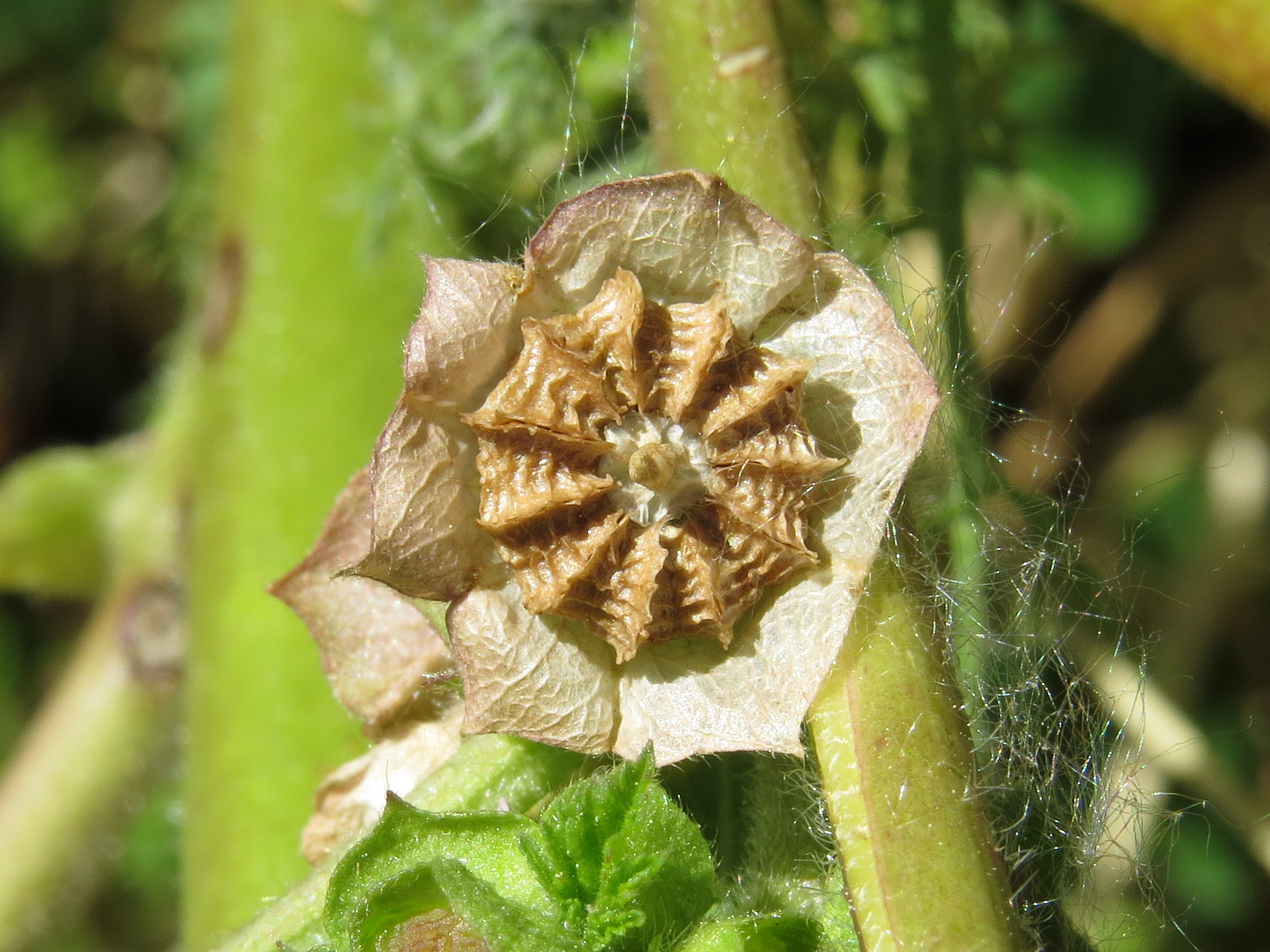
Fruit very mature, showing prominent wavy wings and wavy surfaces

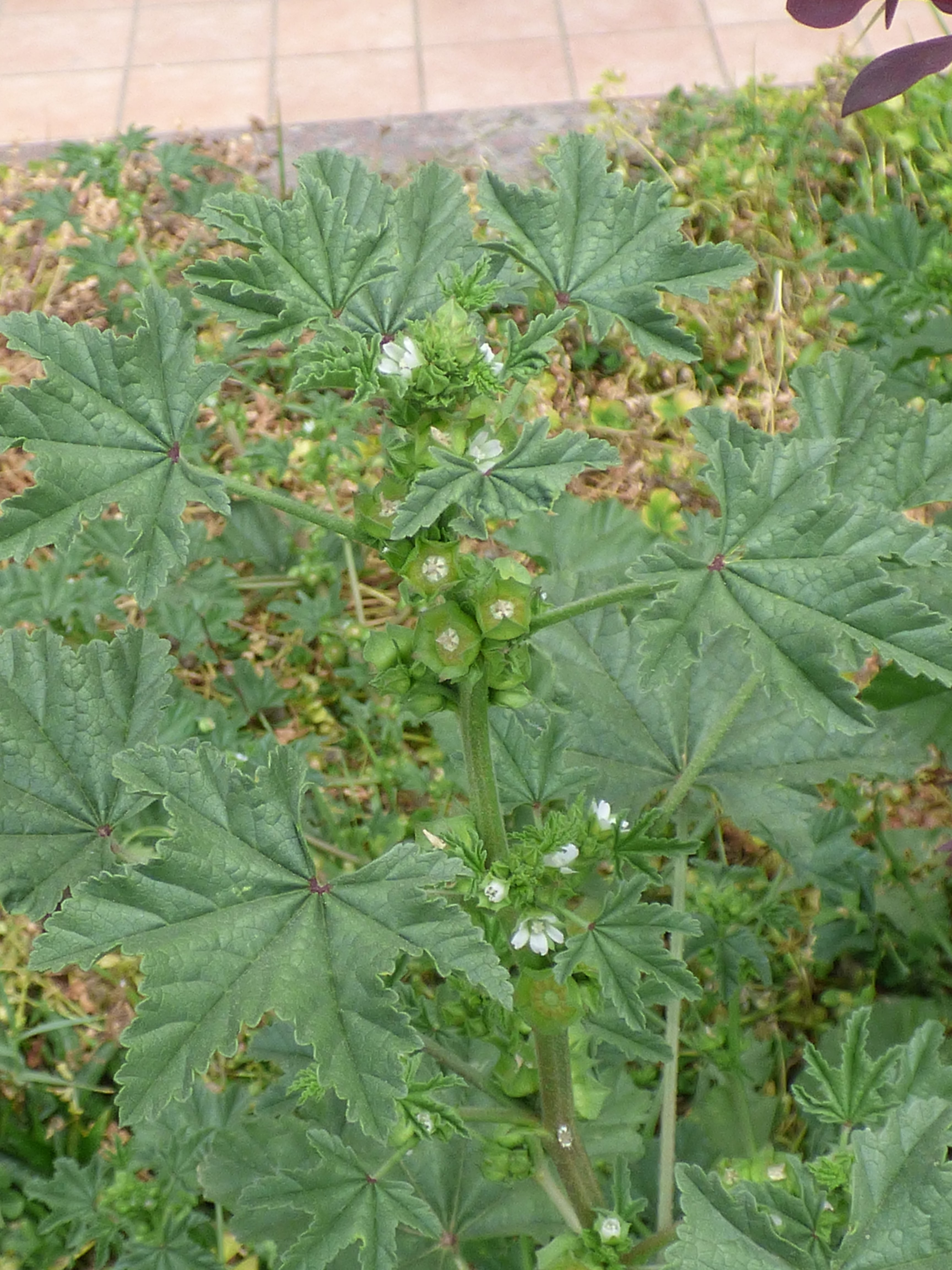
Fruits, on short stalks, not curving downward

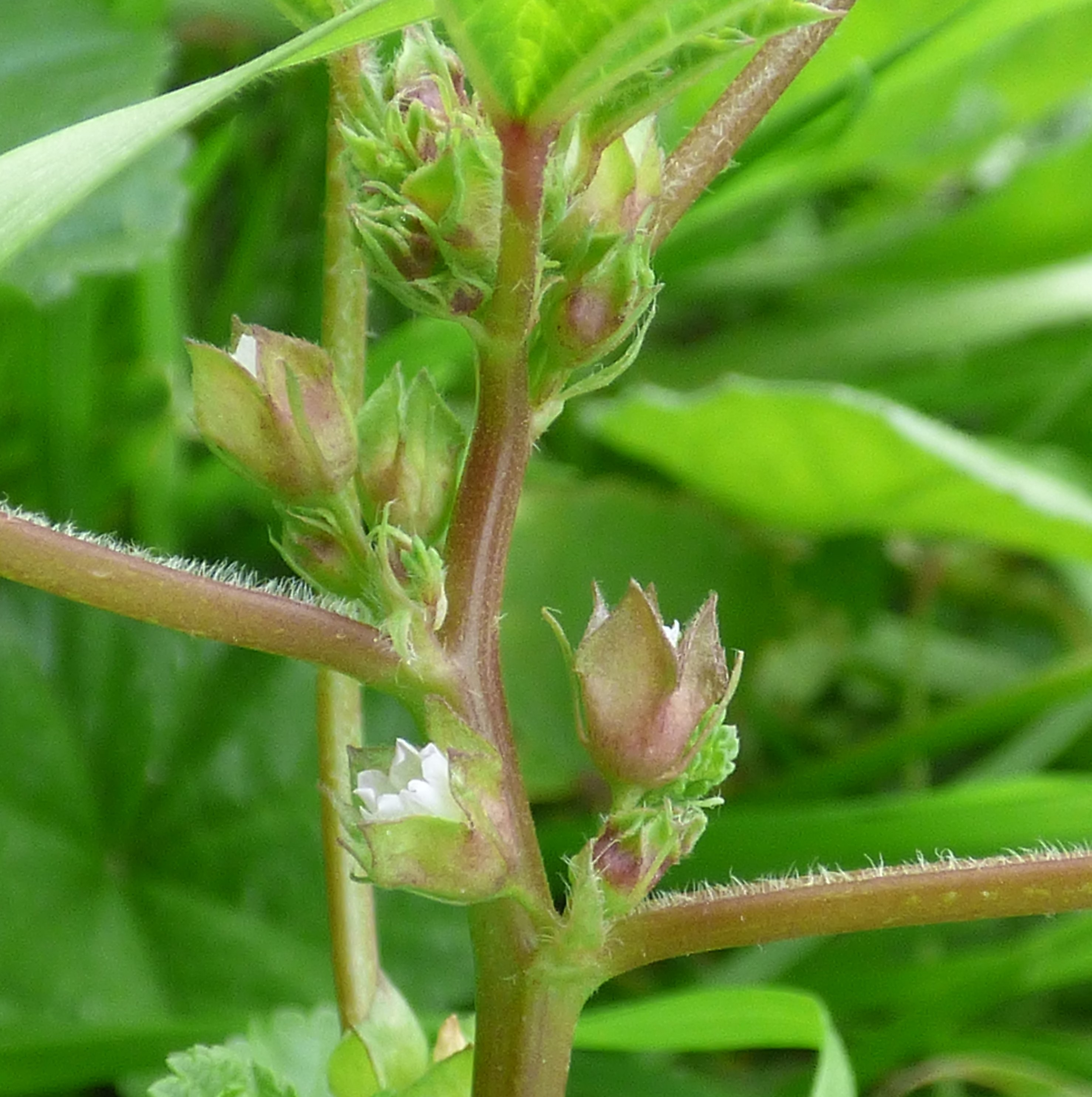
Sepals broad from the side, epicalyx 3 narrow strips at base

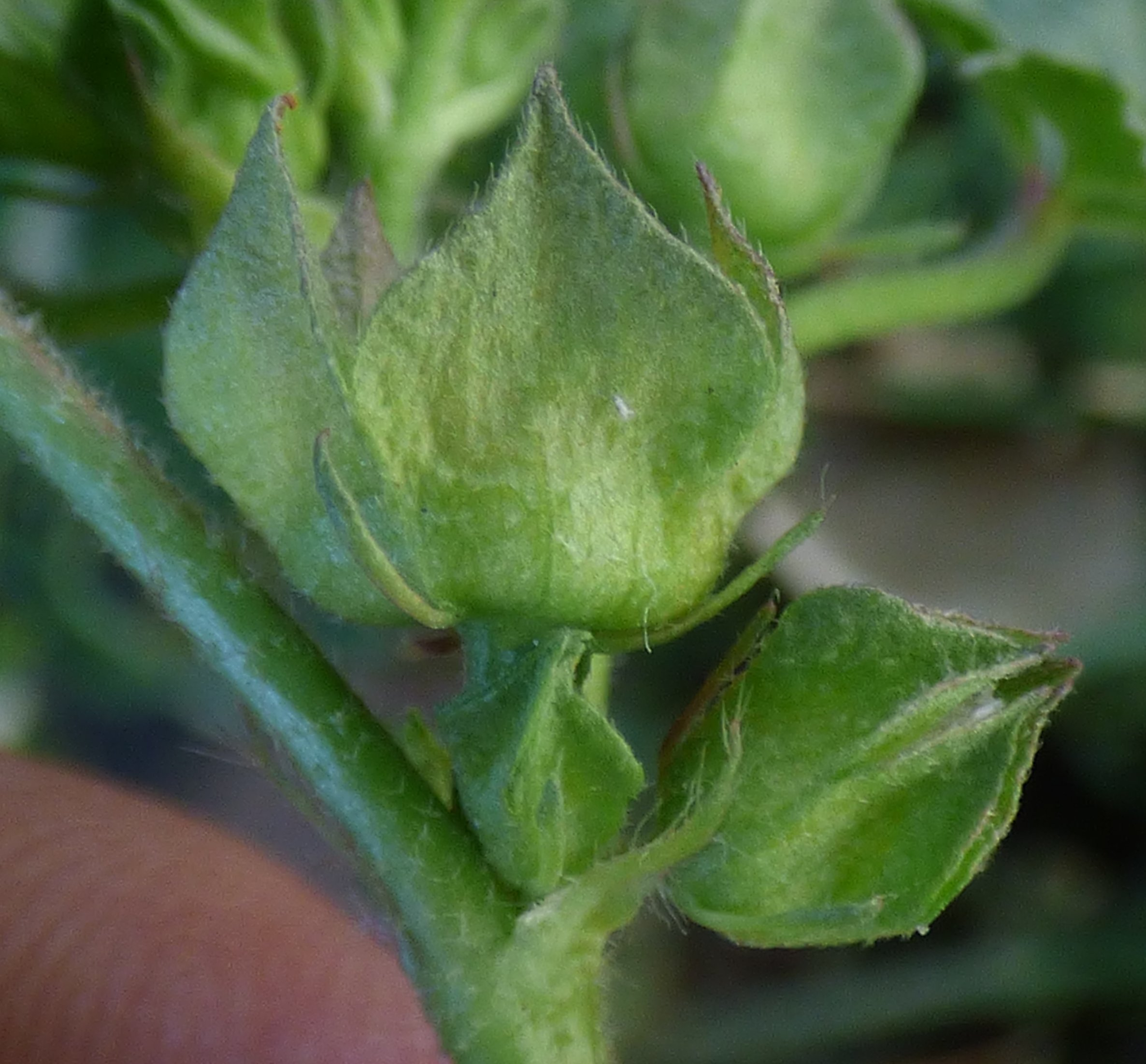
Flower from side showing large 5-part calyx, and 3 filamenty epicalyx coming from base

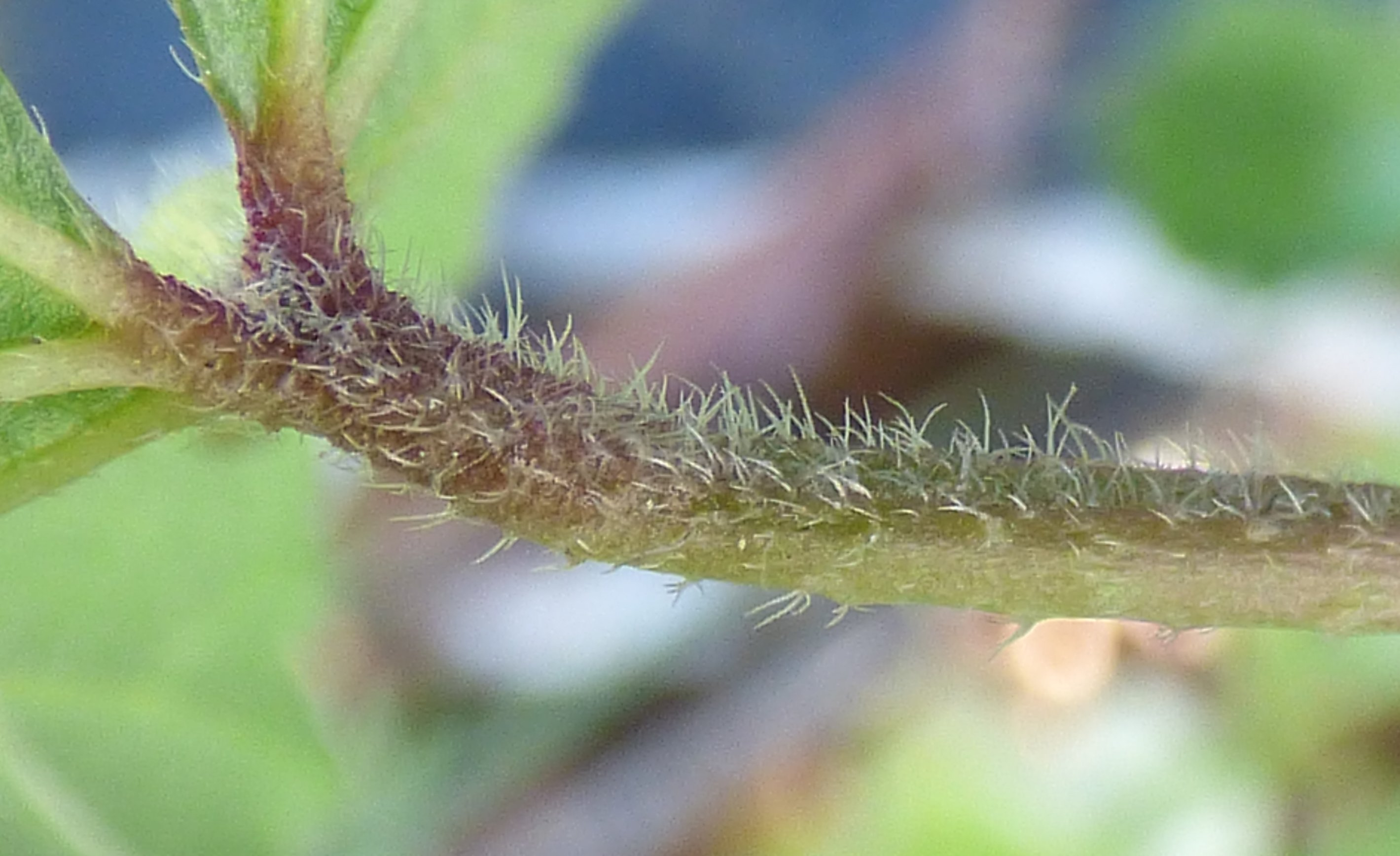
Hairs mostly stellate (star-shaped)

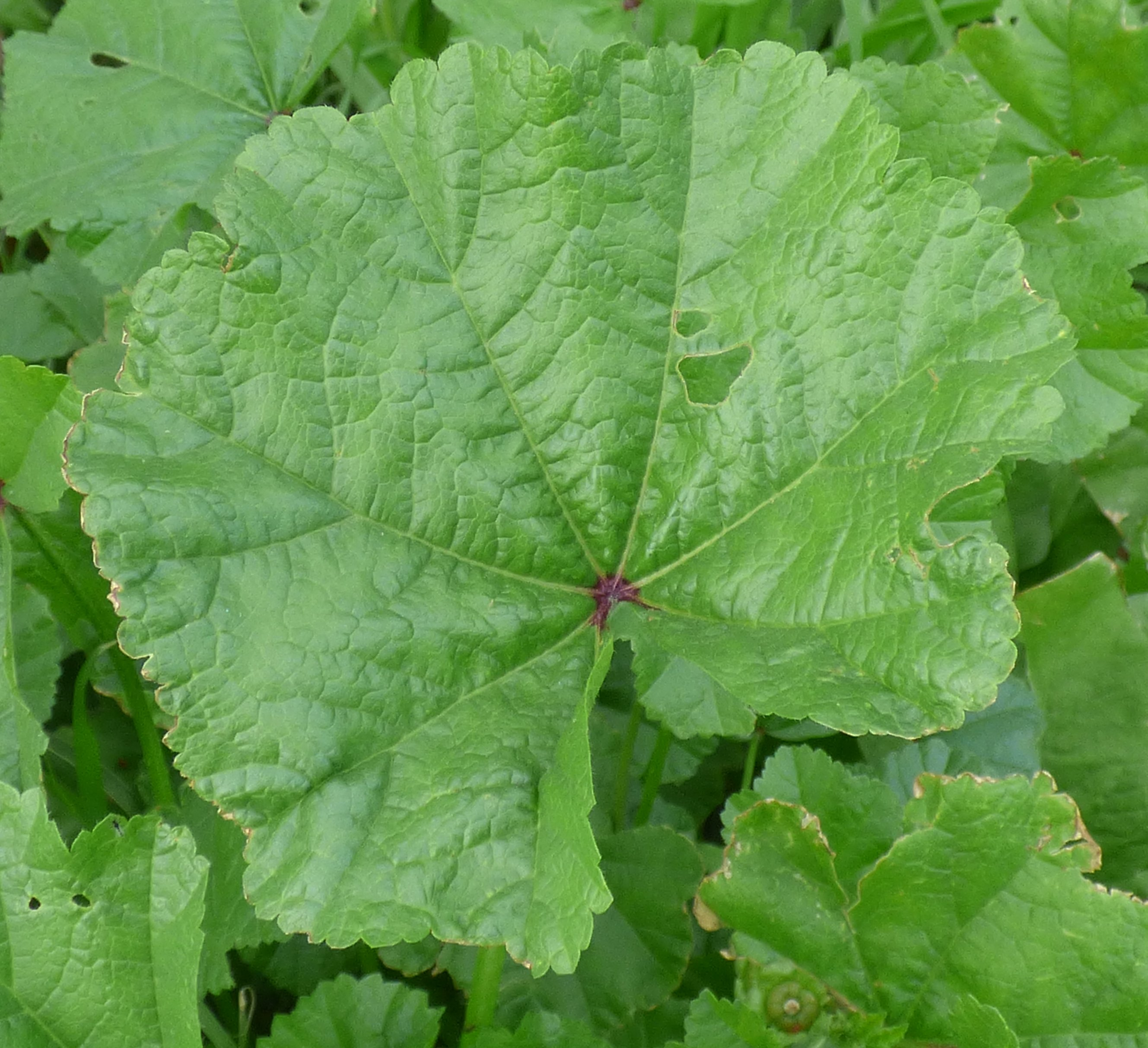
Large leaf

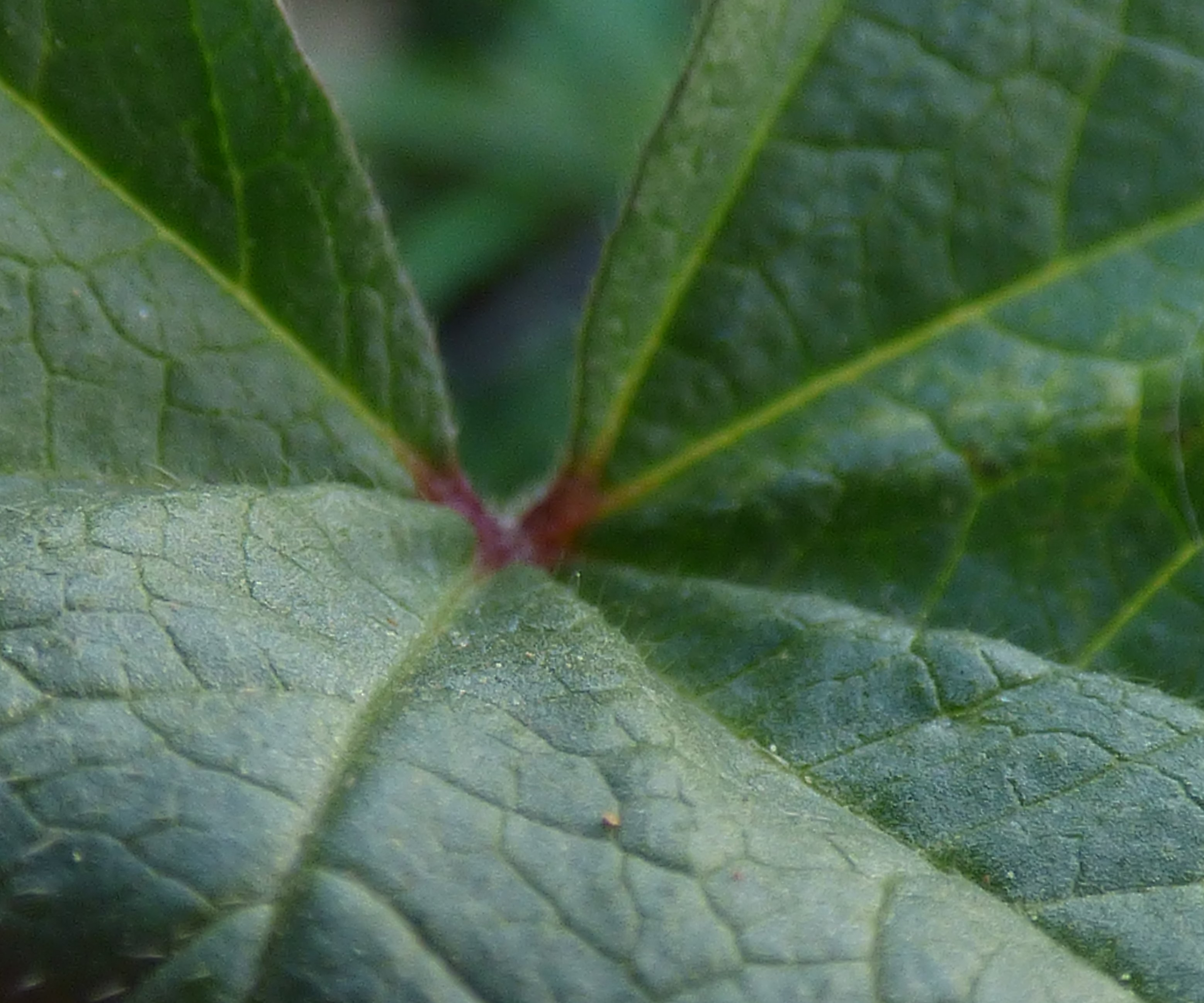
Leaf upperside

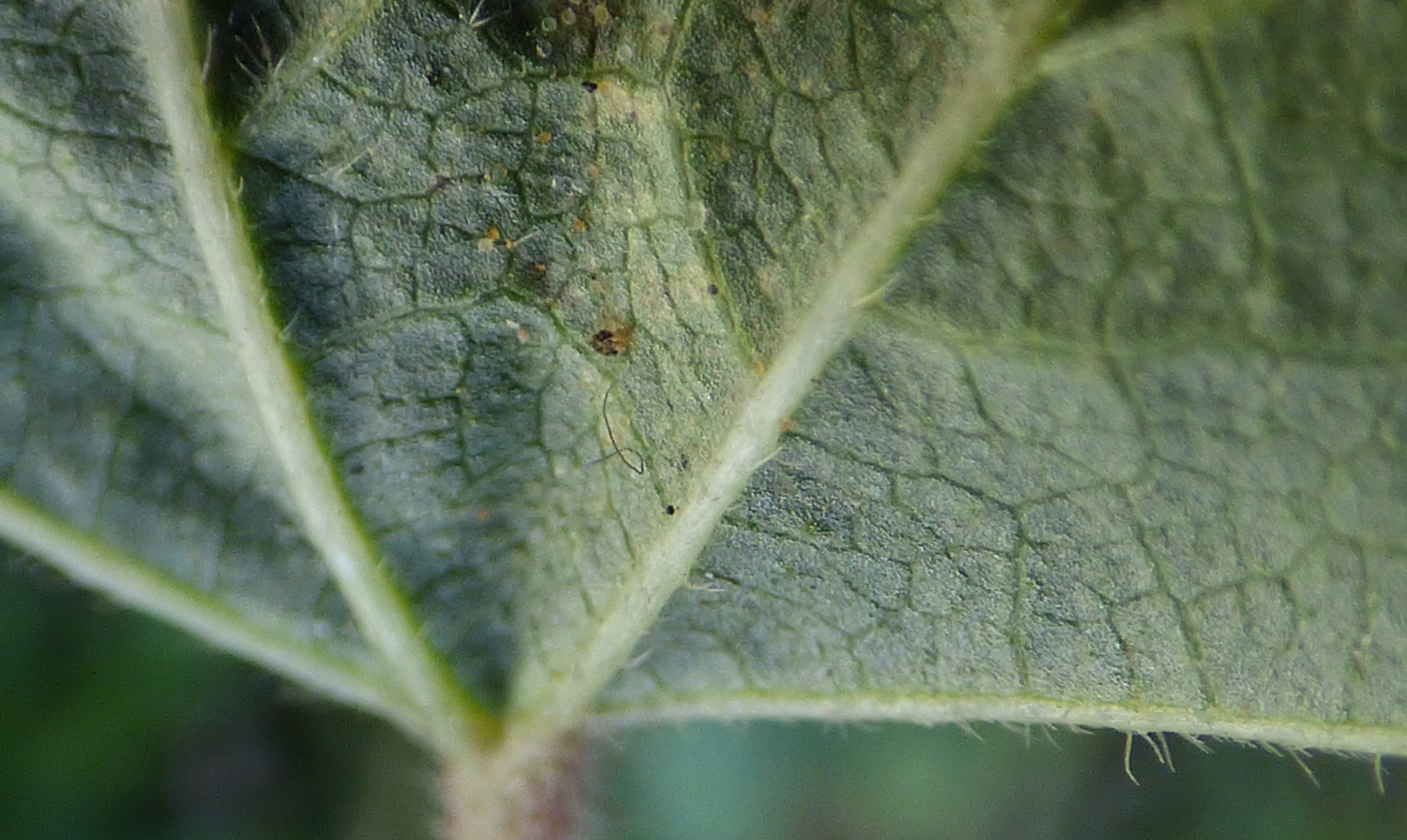
Leaf underside
