= Prickly Pear (British Virgin Islands) =

Island in the British Virgin Islands

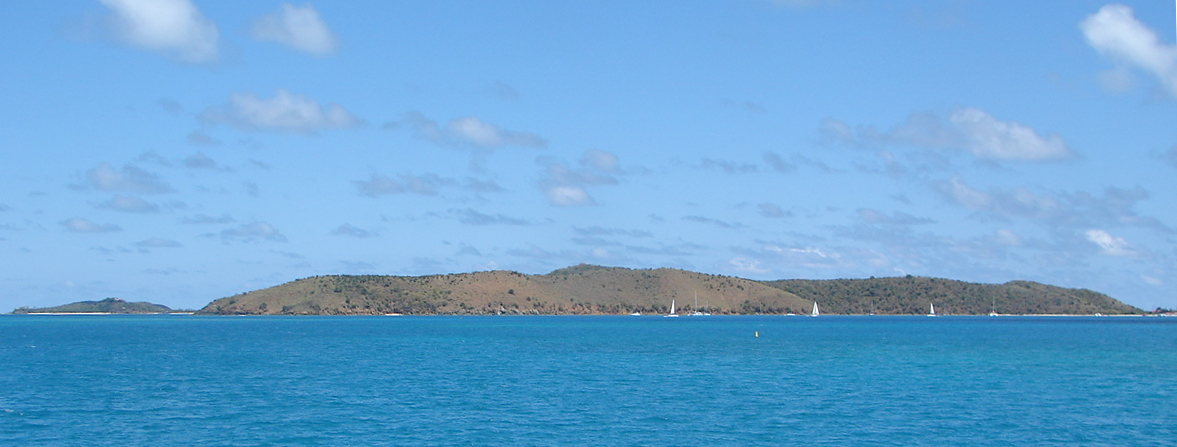
- Prickly Pear island

- The location of Prickly Pear within the British Virgin Islands

- Location within British Virgin Islands Location within the Caribbean

Geography
- Location: Caribbean Sea
- Coordinates: 18°30′N 64°22′W
- Archipelago: Virgin Islands

Administration
- United Kingdom
- British Overseas Territory: British Virgin Islands

Additional information
- Time zone: AST (UTC-4)
- ISO code: VG

Prickly Pear is an uninhabited island of the British Virgin Islands in the Caribbean. Even though the island doesn't have permanent residents, it has a quiet beach bar called SandBox Bar and Grill and recreational water sports facility on it. It is located on the north side of North Sound, opposite Virgin Gorda.

The island was declared to be a National Park in 1988.

The island provides habitat for the common Puerto Rican ameiva (Ameiva exsul), crested anole (Anolis cristatellus wileyae), barred anole (Anolis stratulus), and the big-scaled least gecko (Sphaerodactylus macrolepis macrolepis). The island's flora includes agave (Agave missionum), and copperwood (Bursera simarouba).
