= Prickly pear =

Prickly pear may refer to:

- Opuntia, a genus of cacti producing a fruit known as the prickly pear
  - Opuntia ficus-indica, the species which is the most common culinary source of prickly pear fruits
- Consolea, a genus of cacti including species formerly classified in Opuntia
- Chinese prickly pear, a name for the fruit of Rosa roxburghii
- Prickly Pear (British Virgin Islands), the name of an island
- Prickly pears in Australia, an invasive plant problem
- Prickly Pears (film), a 1981 Italian comedy film
