= Pear (Užice) =

- Village
- Location within Serbia
- Coordinates: 43°53′N 19°39′E
- Country: Serbia
- Time zone: UTC+1 (CET)
  - Summer (DST): UTC+2 (CEST)

Pear (Serbian Cyrillic: Пеар) is a village located in the Užice municipality of Serbia. In the 2011 census, the village had a population of 370.
