= Choke pear (plant) =

Type of astringent fruit

A choke pear or chocky-pear is an astringent fruit. The term is used for the fruit of any variety of pear which has an astringent taste and is difficult to swallow.

== Varieties ==
One variety of choke pear is poire d'Angoisse, a variety of pear that was grown in Angoisse, a commune in the Arrondissement of Nontron in Dordogne, France, in the Middle Ages, which was hard, bad tasting, and almost impossible to eat raw. In the words of L'Académie française, the pear is "si âpre et si revèche au goût qu'on a de la peine à l'avaler" ("so harsh and crabbed of taste that one can only with difficulty swallow it"). These qualities, and the common meaning of angoisse in French ('anguish') apparently originated the French idiom avaler des poires d'angoisse ("swallow pears of Angoisse/anguish") meaning 'to suffer great displeasures'. Possibly because of this idiom, the names choke pear and pear of anguish have been used for a gagging device allegedly used in Europe, sometime before the 17th century.

Dalechamps has identified this with the species of pear that Pliny the Elder listed as ampullaceum in his Naturalis Historia. It, like most sour-tasting pear cultivars, was most likely used to make perry.

== Similar fruits ==
Similarly named trees with astringent fruits include the choke cherry (the common name for several species of cherry tree that grow in North America and whose fruits are small and bitter tasting: Prunus virginiana, Prunus demissa, and Prunus serotina) and the choke plum.
