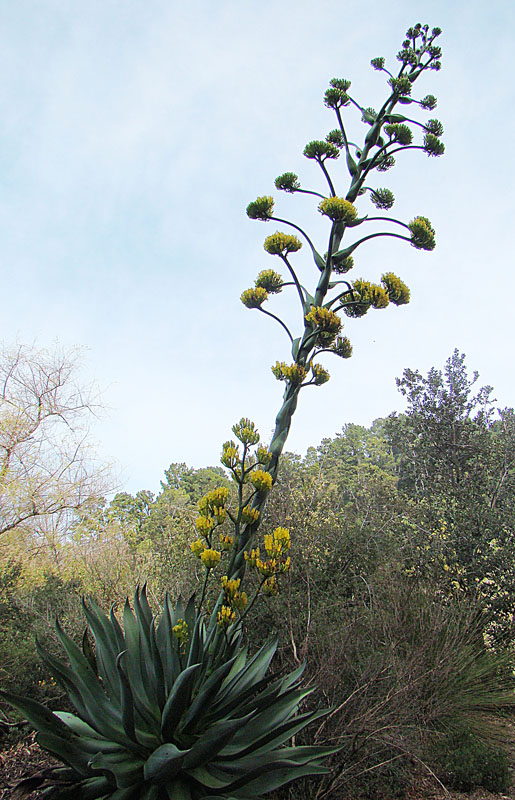

Conservation status
- Least Concern (IUCN 3.1)

Scientific classification
- Kingdom: Plantae
- Clade: Embryophytes
- Clade: Tracheophytes
- Clade: Spermatophytes
- Clade: Angiosperms
- Clade: Monocots
- Order: Asparagales
- Family: Asparagaceae
- Subfamily: Agavoideae
- Genus: Agave
- Species: A. atrovirens

Binomial name
- Agave atrovirens Karw. ex Salm-Dyck

= Agave atrovirens =

Species of flowering plant

Agave atrovirens, called maguey verde grande is a species of Agave (family Agavaceae) native to Oaxaca, Puebla and Veracruz states in Mexico. It is one of the largest of all the Agaves, approached in size only by Agave missionum, and occasionally reaching a weight of 2 t (2.0 long tons; 2.2 short tons). Each succulent leaf can be up to 4.5 m (15 ft) long and weigh 45 kg (99 lb) apiece. In the nominate variety A. a. var. atrovirens these leaves can also be up to 40 cm (16 in) wide. As in other Agaves the leaves form a rosette, from the center of which, after many years, a panicle of flowers emerges on a long scape or peduncle which at first looks like a vast stalk of asparagus, but later grows to more than 12 m (39 ft) height, develops side branches near the top and numerous flowers which open red and gradually turn yellow. Each rosette flowers and fruits once, then dies. According to Fayaz this is one of the species which makes offsets or "pups". It grows naturally only between 1,800–3,400 m (5,900–11,200 ft) where cloud cover is more frequent.

Two varieties are accepted by Plants of the World Online:

- Agave atrovirens var. atrovirens (syn. A. a. cochlearis)
- Agave atrovirens var. mirabilis (Trel.) Gentry

A. atrovirens is a pulque agave that is also collected from the wild for making mezcal.
