= Pyrus (disambiguation) =

Pyrus may refer to:

- The genus of the pear tree (under some taxonomy, sometimes including species of genera Malus and Sorbus)
- Main//Pyrus DMS, a Document Management System
- The PEAR (PHP Extension and Application Repository) installer, requiring at least PHP 5.3, to replace the previous PEAR installer
- Pyrus (software), a cloud-based workflow automation system
- Pyrus (series), a Nordic Christmas calendar in Denmark
