= Polymerase-endonuclease amplification reaction =

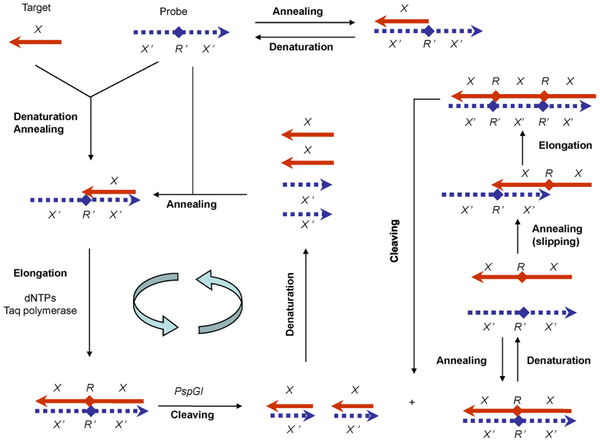
Schematic description of PEAR.

Polymerase-endonuclease amplification reaction (PEAR) is a DNA amplification technology for the amplification of oligonucleotides. A target oligonucleotide and a tandem repeated antisense probe are subjected to repeated cycles of denaturing, annealing, elongation and cleaving, in which thermostable DNA polymerase elongation and strand slipping generate duplex tandem repeats, and thermostable endonuclease (PspGI) cleavage releases monomeric duplex oligonucleotides.

PEAR has the potential to be a useful tool for:

1. Large-scale production of oligonucleotides.
2. PEAR is a minimal DNA replication system, so it can be considered as a minimal life system. it is of therectical interests to study the origin and evolution of repetitive DNA.
3. The repetitive DNA products can be transferred directly into cells or organisms to study the function of the repetitive DNA.
