= Agave missionum =

Conservation status
- Vulnerable (IUCN 3.1)

Scientific classification
- Kingdom: Plantae
- Clade: Tracheophytes
- Clade: Angiosperms
- Clade: Monocots
- Order: Asparagales
- Family: Asparagaceae
- Subfamily: Agavoideae
- Genus: Agave
- Species: A. missionum

Binomial name
- Agave missionum Trel.

Species of plant

Agave missionum of the West Indies is a succulent plant of the family Agavaceae. Its common names include corita and karata. It is exceptionally large; with leaves up to 4.50 m (14.8 ft) in length and up to 50 cm (20 in) wide, equaled only by Agave atrovirens.
