= Pear, West Virginia =

Pear
- Unincorporated community
- Location within the state of West Virginia Pear (the United States)
- Coordinates: 37°48′3″N 80°58′9″W
- Country: United States
- State: West Virginia
- County: Raleigh
- Elevation: 2,874 ft (876 m)
- Time zone: UTC-5 (Eastern (EST))
  - Summer (DST): UTC-4 (EDT)
- GNIS ID: 1742890

Pear is an unincorporated community in Raleigh County, West Virginia, United States.

John Pear Buckland, an early postmaster, gave the community his name.
