= Pear of anguish =

Alleged early modern torture device

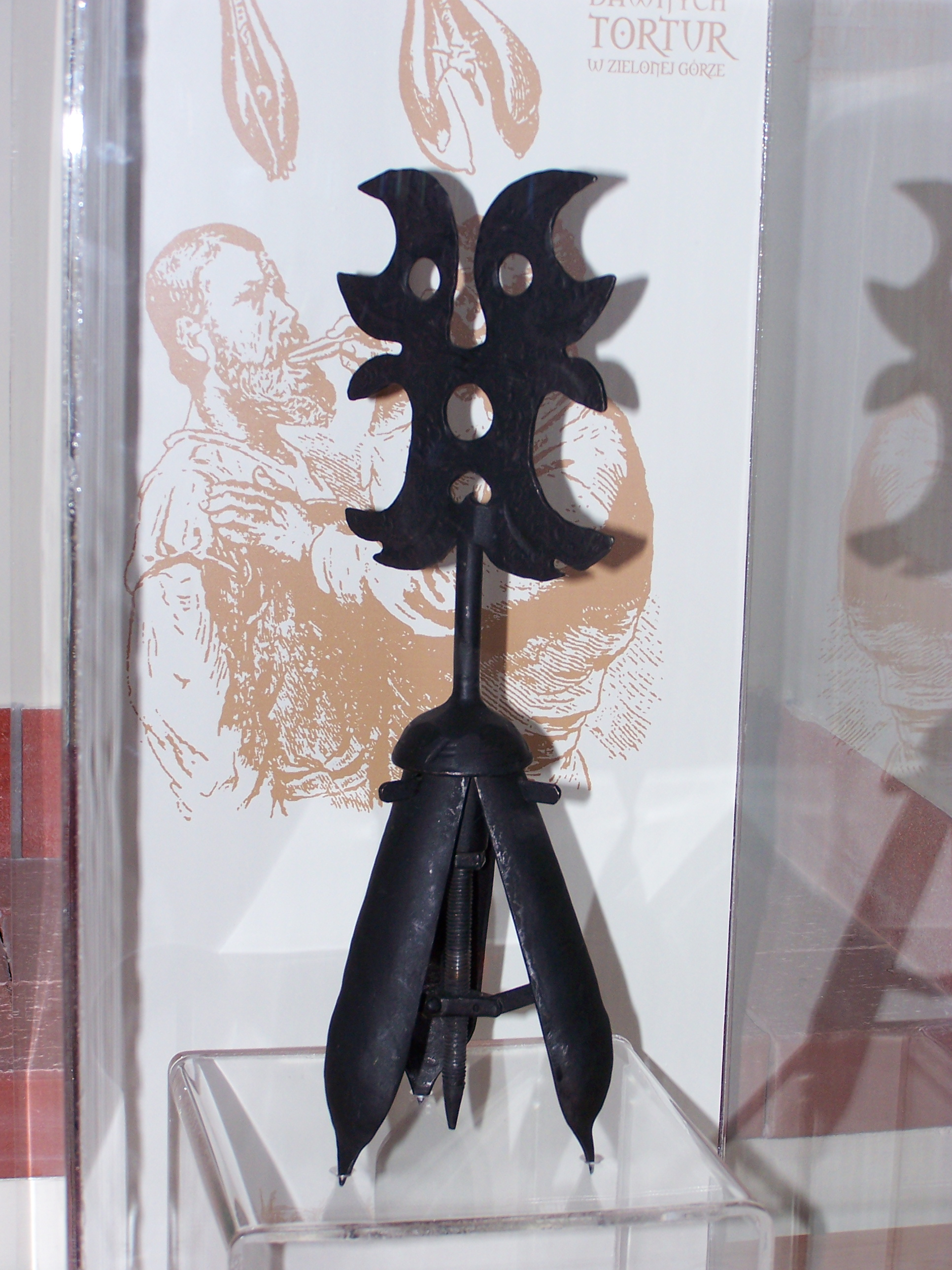
The Pear of Anguish. Torture museum in Lubusz Land Museum in Zielona Góra, Poland.

The pear of anguish, also known as choke pear or mouth pear, is a device of disputed use invented in the early modern period. The mechanism consists of a pear-shaped metal body divided into spoon-like segments that can be spread apart with a spring or by turning a key. Its proposed functionality as a torture device is to be variously inserted into the mouth and other parts of the body and then expanded to gag or mutilate the victim; its historical use as a torture device is controversial.

Some scholars have disputed historical accounts of the pear as being suspiciously implausible. While there exist some examples from the early modern period, some of them open with a spring, and the removable key is there not to open the mechanism, but rather to close it. At least one of the older devices is held closed with a cap at the end, suggesting it could not have been opened after inserting it into an orifice without actively holding it shut. There is no contemporary evidence of such a torture device existing in the medieval era, and ultimately the utility of any genuine pears of anguish remains unknown. It is possible that it could have been used to extract juices from fruit.

== Etymology ==
The term pear of anguish likely originates as a French pun. In French, poire d'angoisse means simultaneously "pear of anguish" (when translated literally), and "pear from Angoisse" (a particularly vile-tasting variety of pears grown there, also known as a choke pear).

== Origins ==
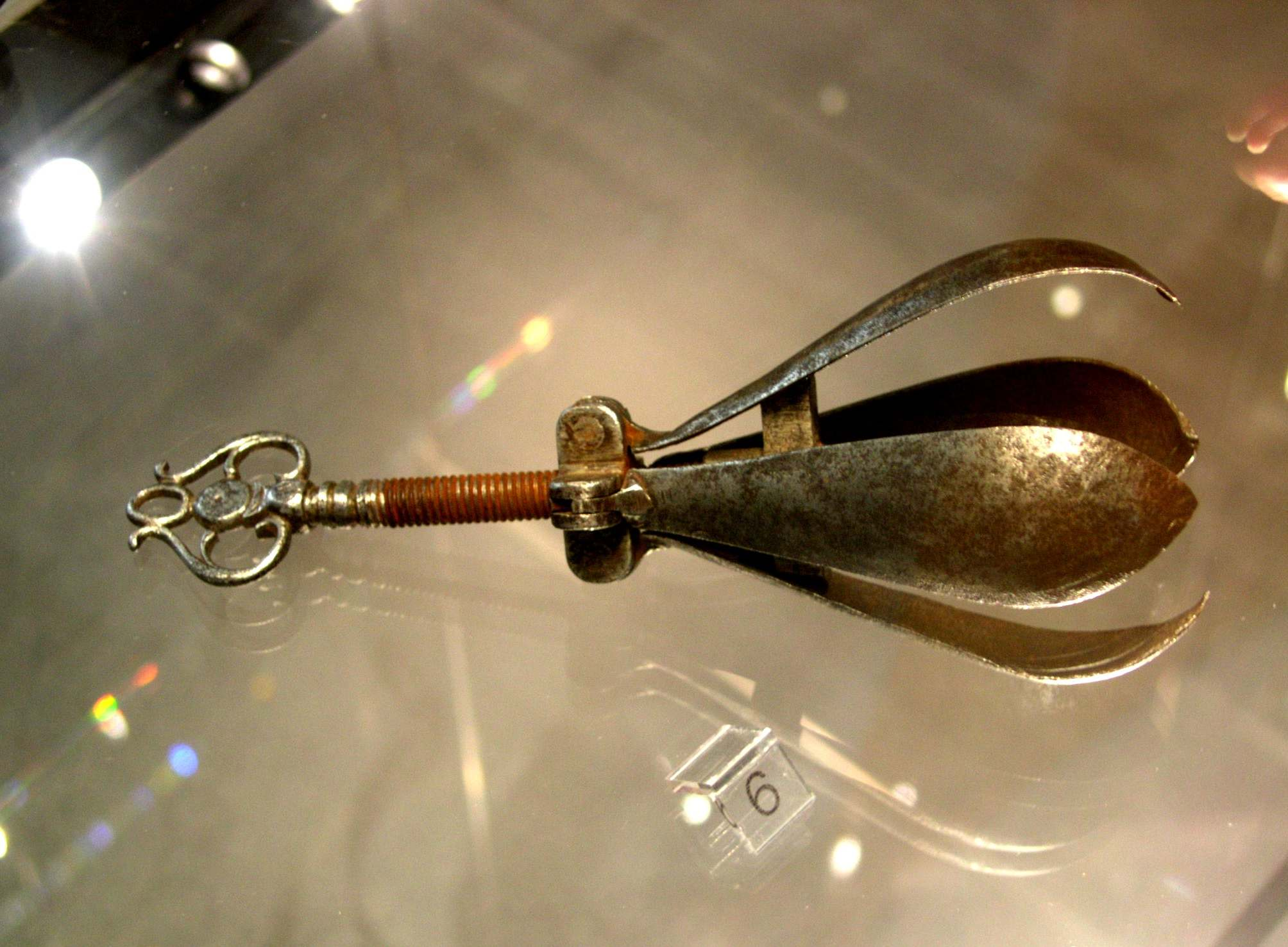
Spikeless Pear, Museum der Festung Salzburg, Austria

There is no contemporary first-hand account of these devices or their use. However, through the design of the devices, such as metal consistency and style, a select few are thought to have been made in the early modern period (circa 1600). An early mention is in F. de Calvi's L'Inventaire général de l'histoire des larrons ("General inventory of the history of thieves"), written in 1639, which attributes the invention to a robber named Capitaine Gaucherou de Palioly in the days of Henry of Navarre. Palioly would have used a mechanical gag to subdue a wealthy Parisian while he and his accomplices robbed the victim's home.

The 1630 book Pathomachia, Or, The Battell of Affections briefly mentions a peare of confession alongside several other torture methods and devices, though it gives no further clues to its use. The 1660 'French and English Dictionary' by Randle Cotgrave translates poire d'angoisse as a a choak-pear; or a wild-soure pear.

Further mentions of the device appear in the 18th and 19th centuries. For example, a 'choak-pear' is described in an issue of The Times dated May 18, 1790. It was reportedly found in the torture chamber of the Inquisition in Avignon. It separated into four parts with hidden springs; "when an accused person was apprehended, this choak-pear was put into his mouth, and the springs separating the jaws, effectually precluded the unfortunate victim from uttering a syllable."

They are also mentioned in Grose's Dictionary of the Vulgar Tongue (1811) as "Choke Pears", and described as aids used in extortion, "formerly used in Holland." The device was evidently known sufficiently well in 19th century France that it is mentioned by Alexandre Dumas in his Twenty Years After (1845) and by Charles Monselet in Les Chemises Rouges (1850-1857); it is used as a gag in both cases.

They were also discussed in a book by Eldridge and Watts, superintendent of police and chief inspector of the detective bureau in Boston, Massachusetts (1897). While accepting that ordinary pear-shaped gags exist, they observed that contemporary robbers used no such device as Palioly's Pear and cast doubt upon its very existence in the first place, saying that "fortunately for us this 'diabolical invention' appears to be one of the lost arts, if, indeed, it ever existed outside of de Calvi's head. There is no doubt, however, of the fashioning of a pear-shaped gag which has been largely used in former days by robbers in Europe and may still be employed to some extent. This is also known as the 'choke-pear', though it is far less marvelous and dangerous than the pear of Palioly."

Another mention is found in Brewer's Dictionary of Phrase and Fable (1898), which claims that "robbers in Holland at one time made use of a piece of iron in the shape of a pear, which they forced into the mouth of their victim. On turning a key, a number of springs thrust forth points of iron in all directions, so that the instrument of torture could never be taken out except by means of the key."

Chris Bishop of Australian National University argues the construction of the oldest indicates it sprang open and screwed closed (as opposed to being screwed open) and the workmanship exceeds that expected from a torture device. Furthermore, the provenance of many of the devices is unknown and the workmanship indicates they are likely of recent manufacture, and the accounts of its use are not contemporary with the Middle Ages, making the accounts suspect. Bishop speculates that the pear's reputation as a medieval torture device may have arisen when an ornate pear that Alexandre-Charles Sauvageot had donated to the Louvre (where it was described as a “mechanism of unknown use”) was misidentified in 1856 as the device described in the 17th-century story about Palioly's gag. As to the original artifact’s use, Bishop concludes:

There are very few genuine examples of a poire d'angoisse from which to build our analysis. We have no clear statement as to what these items might have been, only a connection drawn between an obscure exhibit in a 19th-century collection and a spurious Histoire from two centuries before. That connection having been made, all subsequent sources agreed, and before long a sham industry was established which simultaneously fed off and reinforced the hypothesis by fabricating and retailing new "artifacts". The maladroit reproductions that populate the more tawdry museums can tell us nothing about the origins or purpose of the originals. They are indicative only of our own dark desires and secret fears. We can say that the original devices themselves could not pre-date the 16th century and are, in all likelihood, more recently created even than that. Despite numerous attempts to do so, they cannot be considered "medieval". They are, in every way, very modern inventions. Certainly, they were not used for torture. They are far too elegant and made with too much care for that. One could imagine them as surgical instruments - some sort of speculum perhaps, or a device for levering open the mouth in order that a dentist might operate. But then they could just as easily be shoe-extenders, or sock-stretchers, or glove-wideners.

== Museum pieces ==
Though there is little or no evidence of its use, there are a number of extant examples of variously crude, ornate, and elaborate, pear-shaped devices with three or four leaves or lobes, driven by turning a key that rotates the central screw thread, which spreads or closes the leaves. These are generally held in museums devoted to the subject of torture and are described as instruments of torture by distension or evisceration. Some, but not all, have small spikes of uncertain purpose at the bottom of each leaf. However, these devices do not seem to match the descriptions given by Calvi or the 19th-century sources.

== See also ==
- Choke pear (plant), a hard-to-swallow fruit that may have been the origin of the instrument's name.
- Iron maiden, another supposed torture device with little actual evidence of use
- The Reckoning, a 2020 film set in the 17th century in which the main character is tortured with a pear of anguish after being accused of witchcraft.
