= Quelite =

Quelite can mean any of a number of different plants commonly eaten in Mexico for their leaves, as leaf vegetables or herbs, including:

- Amaranthus, species known as Quelite quintonil/quintonilli Amaranthus hybridus, Amaranthus retroflexus, Amaranthus palmeri S. Wats., Amaranthus powellii S. Wats., Amaranthus dubius, Amaranthus spinosus
- Chenopodium, species known as Quelite cenizo, especially Chenopodium album
- Coriandrum, species
