= List of tornadoes in the outbreak of May 25–30, 2019 =

From May 25–30, 2019, yet another large and devastating tornado outbreak affected most of the Central and Eastern United States.

== Confirmed tornadoes ==
Daily statistics
Date	Total	EFU	EF0	EF1	EF2	EF3	EF4	EF5	Deaths	Injuries
May 25	17	5	6	4	1	1	0	0	2	29
May 26	41	3	23	13	2	0	0	0	0	0
May 27	59	1	36	12	3	6	1	0	1	178
May 28	21	2	6	6	6	0	1	0	0	30
May 29	41	8	22	8	3	0	0	0	0	2
May 30	3	0	2	1	0	0	0	0	0	0
Total	182	19	95	44	15	7	2	0	3	239
Notes = Note that "EFU" implies unknown category. Eight tornadoes are currently not listed here.

=== May 25 event ===
List of confirmed tornadoes – Saturday, May 25, 2019 (Note: All dates are based on the local time zone where the tornado touched down; however, all times are in Coordinated Universal Time for consistency.)
EF#	Location	County / Parish	State	Start Coord.	Time (UTC)	Path length	Max width
EFU	WSW of Anton	Hockley	TX	33.7796°N 102.2978°W	21:59–22:01	1.06 mi (1.71 km)	30 yd (27 m)
EFU	Storm chasers reported a tornado. Flooded roads prevented the survey team from assessing damage.						
EF2	Northern Plainview	Hale	TX	34.2195°N 101.7257°W	22:39–22:44	1.69 mi (2.72 km)	100 yd (91 m)
EF2	A mobile home and two outbuildings were destroyed, and tin roofs were blown off storage buildings at the north edge of Plainview. A cell phone tower was blown over onto a road and destroyed, and a tractor trailer was tossed and dragged 150 yd (140 m).						
EF1	Carrollton	Carroll	OH	40.58°N 81.09°W	22:42–22:43	0.54 mi (0.87 km)	50 yd (46 m)
EF1	A single-wide mobile home was overturned, and several other homes in Carrollton had their shingles ripped off. A metal shed was destroyed and numerous trees were snapped.						
EFU	N of Cotton Center	Hale	TX	34.0022°N 102.0567°W	23:08–23:16	4.64 mi (7.47 km)	100 yd (91 m)
EFU	A center pivot irrigation system was overturned. A cotton trailer and livestock feed bunk were also pulled across a road.						
EFU	SW of Willow	Greer	OK	35.0449°N 99.5163°W	00:04–00:06	0.3 mi (0.48 km)	30 yd (27 m)
EFU	A television storm chaser sighted a tornado. No damage was reported.						
EFU	SW of Retrop	Beckham	OK	35.1293°N 99.3976°W	00:14	0.2 mi (0.32 km)	50 yd (46 m)
EFU	A storm chaser observed a tornado that may have lasted longer than documented but became rain-wrapped. No damage was reported.						
EFU	SW of Memphis	Hall	TX	34.6986°N 100.6289°W	00:40	0.01 mi (0.016 km)	30 yd (27 m)
EFU	Storm chasers sighted a brief tornado. No damage was reported.						
EF1	N of Blairsville	Indiana	PA	40.4494°N 79.273°W	00:27–00:29	5.13 mi (8.26 km)	35 yd (32 m)
EF1	One home sustained roof damage, several bricks were dislodged at a second house, and at least 30 trees were snapped or uprooted.						
EF0	SW of Penn Run	Indiana	PA	40.6131°N 79.0317°W	00:32–00:33	0.07 mi (0.11 km)	20 yd (18 m)
EF0	Some trees were uprooted by this extremely small, brief tornado.						
EF3	Southern El Reno	Canadian	OK	35.50°N 97.955°W	03:28–03:32	2.2 mi (3.5 km)	75 yd (69 m)
EF3	2 deaths – See section on this tornado – 29 people were injured.						
EF0	Western Oklahoma City	Oklahoma	OK	35.481°N 97.599°W	03:46–03:47	0.9 mi (1.4 km)	50 yd (46 m)
EF0	Trees, in addition to house roofs, porches, and carports, were damaged in a neighborhood in western Oklahoma City.						
EF0	Northwestern Oklahoma City	Oklahoma	OK	35.49°N 97.539°W	03:49–03:50	0.7 mi (1.1 km)	50 yd (46 m)
EF0	A restaurant and a house suffered roof damage, while another building had its windows broken. Tree, power lines, street signs, and an outbuilding were damaged as well.						
EF0	Northern Oklahoma City	Oklahoma	OK	35.516°N 97.492°W	03:53	0.5 mi (0.80 km)	30 yd (27 m)
EF0	A church sign was destroyed and trees were uprooted, one of which fell onto a parked car.						
EF0	W of Norman	Cleveland	OK	35.249°N 97.552°W	03:56–03:57	0.7 mi (1.1 km)	30 yd (27 m)
EF0	Buildings, a number of trees, and a mobile home were damaged.						
EF0	Northeastern Oklahoma City	Oklahoma	OK	35.5364°N 97.4595°W	03:57	0.2 mi (0.32 km)	30 yd (27 m)
EF0	A convenience store was damaged by this very brief, small tornado.						
EF1	WNW of Green Valley	Tazewell	IL	40.4188°N 89.7073°W	04:14–04:16	1.15 mi (1.85 km)	200 yd (180 m)
EF1	The roof of a manufactured home and several trees were damaged.						
EF1	N of Green Valley	Tazewell	IL	40.4198°N 89.6378°W	04:19–04:20	0.72 mi (1.16 km)	150 yd (140 m)
EF1	A large shed and an irrigation unit were damaged. A tree was uprooted.						

=== May 26 event ===
List of confirmed tornadoes – Sunday, May 26, 2019
EF#	Location	County / Parish	State	Start Coord.	Time (UTC)	Path length	Max width
EF1	N of Bristow	Creek	OK	35.9011°N 96.4495°W	05:04–05:07	2.6 mi (4.2 km)	200 yd (180 m)
EF1	Outbuildings, as well as the roofs of several homes, were damaged. Trees were uprooted as well.						
EF1	SW of Kellyville	Creek	OK	35.9079°N 96.3092°W	05:14–05:24	10.7 mi (17.2 km)	1,000 yd (910 m)
EF1	A large, but weak tornado snapped and uprooted trees and damaged many outbuildings.						
EF1	Sapulpa	Creek, Tulsa	OK	35.9876°N 96.2139°W	05:21–05:38	12.5 mi (20.1 km)	1,400 yd (1,300 m)
EF1	A large, but weak tornado snapped or uprooted numerous trees, damaged homes and businesses, and knocked down power poles in town.						
EF1	SW of Sapulpa to Jenks	Creek, Tulsa	OK	35.9911°N 96.1320°W	05:27–05:39	12.3 mi (19.8 km)	2,200 yd (2,000 m)
EF1	A very large, but weak and diffuse tornado snapped or uprooted numerous trees, and damaged homes and businesses in Sapulpa.						
EF0	NE of Broken Arrow	Tulsa, Wagoner	OK	36.0693°N 95.778°W	05:51–05:54	1.8 mi (2.9 km)	400 yd (370 m)
EF0	A tornado damaged the roofs of multiple homes, damaged the baseball field at a high school, and snapped large tree limbs.						
EF0	W of Rentiesville	McIntosh	OK	35.5285°N 95.5923°W	06:15	0.2 mi (0.32 km)	75 yd (69 m)
EF0	Large tree limbs were snapped.						
EF1	Champaign	Champaign	IL	40.0948°N 88.2679°W	06:23–06:25	0.9 mi (1.4 km)	250 yd (230 m)
EF1	A brief tornado damaged numerous trees in Champaign.						
EF1	Urbana	Champaign	IL	40.0866°N 88.2083°W	06:27–06:29	0.85 mi (1.37 km)	250 yd (230 m)
EF1	Numerous trees were damaged, and several buildings were damaged at the University of Illinois.						
EF1	SW of St. Joseph	Champaign	IL	40.0986°N 88.0571°W	06:35–06:37	1.01 mi (1.63 km)	250 yd (230 m)
EF1	Trees were damaged.						
EF0	E of Salina	Mayes	OK	36.2973°N 95.0889°W	06:44–06:47	3.2 mi (5.1 km)	300 yd (270 m)
EF0	Trees were snapped or uprooted.						
EF0	NW of Savoy	Washington	AR	36.1348°N 94.3808°W	07:30–07:32	1.5 mi (2.4 km)	100 yd (91 m)
EF0	Large tree limbs were snapped.						
EF0	S of Riverside	Bingham	ID	43.1711°N 112.45°W	19:57–20:12	1.8 mi (2.9 km)	100 yd (91 m)
EF0	Several trees were snapped or uprooted, though some were rotted or had shallow root systems. A resident measured a wind gust of 55 mph (90 km/h).						
EFU	NE of Wiley	Prowers	CO	38.12°N 102.58°W	20:38–20:40	0.25 mi (0.40 km)	20 yd (18 m)
EFU	An NWS employee sighted a tornado that remained over open fields and caused no visible damage.						
EFU	S of McClave	Bent	CO	38.10°N 102.85°W	20:54–20:55	0.25 mi (0.40 km)	20 yd (18 m)
EFU	A tornado was observed by storm chasers. No known damage occurred.						
EF0	W of Mingo	Thomas	KS	39.2754°N 101.0088°W	21:36–21:41	0.96 mi (1.54 km)	100 yd (91 m)
EF0	Storm spotters reported a tornado. No known damage occurred.						
EFU	NNE of Sweetwater Reservoir	Kiowa	CO	38.40°N 102.75°W	22:10–22:11	0.25 mi (0.40 km)	20 yd (18 m)
EFU	A trained spotter observed a tornado. No damage was reported.						
EF0	NW of Keensburg	Weld	CO	40.12°N 104.53°W	22:38	0.01 mi (0.016 km)	25 yd (23 m)
EF0	A tornado observed over open fields, causing no damage.						
EF0	NW of Roggen	Weld	CO	40.23°N 104.45°W	22:53	0.01 mi (0.016 km)	25 yd (23 m)
EF0	A tornado was observed over open fields before becoming rain-wrapped. No known damage occurred.						
EF0	ENE of Pasamonte to WNW of Clayton	Union	NM	36.33°N 103.59°W	22:55–23:30	21.74 mi (34.99 km)	75 yd (69 m)
EF0	Storm chasers and the Clayton Fire Department reported a tornado. No known damage occurred.						
EF0	W of Pawnee Buttes	Weld	CO	40.81°N 104.11°W	23:27–23:32	0.01 mi (0.016 km)	25 yd (23 m)
EF0	A tornado was observed over open fields. No known damage occurred.						
EF0	NE of Watkins	Adams	CO	39.77°N 104.56°W	23:37	0.01 mi (0.016 km)	25 yd (23 m)
EF0	A brief tornado was observed over open fields. No known damage occurred.						
EF0	NNW of Clayton	Union	NM	36.5012°N 103.2136°W	23:50–23:55	2.62 mi (4.22 km)	50 yd (46 m)
EF0	A storm chaser observed a tornado. No known damage occurred.						
EF0	SSE of Hugo	Lincoln	CO	39.07°N 103.43°W	23:58–00:08	0.02 mi (0.032 km)	50 yd (46 m)
EF0	Law enforcement sighted a tornado over open fields. No damage was reported.						
EF0	ESE of Boaz	Chaves	NM	33.64°N 103.71°W	00:04–00:09	2.39 mi (3.85 km)	50 yd (46 m)
EF0	A storm chaser reported a tornado. No known damage occurred.						
EF1	SW of Upland	Franklin	NE	40.2632°N 98.9848°W	00:21–00:23	1.9 mi (3.1 km)	500 yd (460 m)
EF1	A detached garage was completely destroyed, and one home and some trees sustained minor damage.						
EF0	NW of Adrian	Oldham	TX	35.6047°N 103.0116°W	00:25–00:26	0.34 mi (0.55 km)	50 yd (46 m)
EF0	A large feeder was tossed over 300 yd (270 m).						
EF0	SW of Pep	Roosevelt	NM	33.74°N 103.43°W	00:25–00:27	0.79 mi (1.27 km)	50 yd (46 m)
EF0	A storm chaser sighted a tornado. No known damage occurred.						
EF0	W of Hartley	Hartley	TX	35.8998°N 102.5413°W	01:02–01:05	2 mi (3.2 km)	50 yd (46 m)
EF0	Multiple storm chasers and an NWS employee reported a tornado. No known damage occurred.						
EF0	E of Hartley	Hartley	TX	35.84°N 102.243°W	01:14–01:20	5.2 mi (8.4 km)	75 yd (69 m)
EF0	Multiple storm chasers reported a tornado. No known damage occurred.						
EF2	SE of Dora to NE of Rogers	Roosevelt	NM	33.888°N 103.3004°W	01:20–01:47	9.5 mi (15.3 km)	200 yd (180 m)
EF2	This tornado tracked primarily across rural farmland, damaging two homes. A well-built hay barn was destroyed and more than a dozen power poles were snapped. One power pole was snapped and lofted into the air before being driven into the ground 100 yd (91 m) away. Some ground scouring was noted along NM 114.						
EF0	NNE of Causey	Roosevelt	NM	33.9975°N 103.0777°W	01:57–02:02	2.07 mi (3.33 km)	50 yd (46 m)
EF0	Storm chasers and broadcast media relayed a tornado. No known damage occurred.						
EF0	W of Progress	Bailey, Parmer	TX	34.269°N 102.948°W	02:11–02:25	4.96 mi (7.98 km)	50 yd (46 m)
EF0	A center pivot irrigation system was overturned.						
EF0	Linn	Washington	KS	39.6831°N 97.0846°W	02:22–02:24	0.12 mi (0.19 km)	50 yd (46 m)
EF0	An outbuilding was destroyed and a school sustained broken windows in town.						
EF2	NW of Earth	Lamb	TX	34.2304°N 102.5229°W	02:56–03:12	8.03 mi (12.92 km)	100 yd (91 m)
EF2	An electrical transmission line pole was snapped at the base, two center pivot irrigation systems were tipped over, and large tree branches were broken.						
EF0	SE of Dimmitt	Castro	TX	34.3861°N 102.311°W	03:26–03:52	12.83 mi (20.65 km)	100 yd (91 m)
EF0	Two center pivot irrigation systems were flipped.						
EF1	E of Cimarron	Gray	KS	37.8213°N 100.3394°W	03:49–03:50	0.74 mi (1.19 km)	25 yd (23 m)
EF1	A pivot irrigation sprinkler was dislodged from its pivot and drug 10 yd (9.1 m).						
EF1	N of Howell	Ford	KS	37.7905°N 100.1806°W	03:51–03:53	1.86 mi (2.99 km)	25 yd (23 m)
EF1	A few outbuildings were heavily damaged.						
EF1	E of Howell	Ford	KS	37.7626°N 100.1106°W	03:52–03:54	1.83 mi (2.95 km)	25 yd (23 m)
EF1	A large cottonwood tree was uprooted.						
EF1	W of Windhorst	Ford	KS	37.7297°N 99.7239°W	04:07–04:09	3.09 mi (4.97 km)	50 yd (46 m)
EF1	A building and trees were damaged at a farm.						
EF0	N of Jetmore	Hodgeman	KS	38.1184°N 99.9017°W	04:14–04:15	1.71 mi (2.75 km)	25 yd (23 m)
EF0	A residence sustained minor damage.						
EF1	NE of Hanston	Hodgeman	KS	38.1601°N 99.6583°W	04:28–04:30	1.27 mi (2.04 km)	25 yd (23 m)
EF1	A pivot irrigation sprinkler was heavily damaged.						

=== May 27 event ===
List of confirmed tornadoes – Monday, May 27, 2019
EF#	Location	County / Parish	State	Start Coord.	Time (UTC)	Path length	Max width
EF1	Byers	Pratt, Stafford	KS	37.7483°N 98.9294°W	05:00–05:11	8.88 mi (14.29 km)	100 yd (91 m)
EF1	A tornado caused EF1 damage in Byers.						
EF0	N of Vega	Oldham	TX	35.3642°N 102.4362°W	05:25–05:26	1.51 mi (2.43 km)	50 yd (46 m)
EF0	A storm chaser reported a tornado with accompanying power flashes. No known damage occurred.						
EF0	NW of Amarillo	Potter	TX	35.4774°N 101.985°W	06:10–06:11	1.58 mi (2.54 km)	50 yd (46 m)
EF0	Live television broadcast showed a tornado over open country. No damage was reported.						
EF0	NNE of Tipton	Mitchell	KS	39.351°N 98.4619°W	06:13–06:14	0.01 mi (0.016 km)	25 yd (23 m)
EF0	A house had a small part of its roof torn off, plastering insulation onto the home and a truck. Siding was damaged, a small piece of a shingle was impaled into a piece of farm equipment, and two small trailers were turned.						
EF0	N of Glenville	Freeborn	MN	43.5837°N 93.2778°W	17:07–17:08	0.6 mi (0.97 km)	50 yd (46 m)
EF0	Numerous trees were snapped or uprooted.						
EF1	Western Charles City	Floyd	IA	43.0486°N 92.7366°W	17:23–17:37	9.83 mi (15.82 km)	105 yd (96 m)
EF1	A high-end EF1 tornado impacted the western fringes of Charles City, where seven buildings at the Floyd County Fairgrounds were heavily damaged or destroyed. A fertilizer plant had its roof partially peeled off, another building had its entire side ripped off, and three homes sustained considerable damage to their roofs and garages. Trees were damaged as well.						
EF0	SW of Elma	Chickasaw, Howard	IA	43.1695°N 92.5311°W	18:10–18:15	4.07 mi (6.55 km)	25 yd (23 m)
EF0	Two farms sustained minor damage.						
EF0	NNW of Chester	Fillmore	MN	43.5482°N 92.3902°W	18:23–18:24	0.18 mi (0.29 km)	25 yd (23 m)
EF0	A brief tornado flipped a shed over a tree line.						
EF3	ENE of Cantril	Van Buren	IA	40.667°N 91.9983°W	18:25–18:42	7.27 mi (11.70 km)	100 yd (91 m)
EF3	A hunting cabin and a house were destroyed, with the house being twisted off of its foundation and largely collapsed. Outbuildings were destroyed, and trees were snapped or denuded, a few of which sustained some debarking.						
EF1	S of Saratoga to Lime Springs	Howard	IA	43.2975°N 92.4343°W	18:25–18:43	12.62 mi (20.31 km)	95 yd (87 m)
EF1	A tornado tracked through mostly farmland, damaging cattle and hog barns. A wind turbine was damaged near Highway 9, and minor tree damage occurred in Lime Springs before the tornado dissipated.						
EF0	W of Etna	Fillmore	MN	43.6029°N 92.3531°W	18:29–18:30	0.21 mi (0.34 km)	15 yd (14 m)
EF0	A brief tornado damaged trees at a cemetery.						
EF1	S of Houghton	Lee	IA	40.7793°N 91.61°W	18:36–18:37	0.53 mi (0.85 km)	20 yd (18 m)
EF1	A brief tornado blew the roof off of a metal building.						
EF0	E of Spring Valley	Fillmore	MN	43.6835°N 92.3285°W	18:40–18:41	0.19 mi (0.31 km)	25 yd (23 m)
EF0	A brief tornado damaged a cattle barn.						
EF0	NNW of Plattville	Kendall	IL	41.5732°N 88.4136°W	18:47–18:48	0.97 mi (1.56 km)	30 yd (27 m)
EF0	A brief tornado occurred over open fields, causing no damage.						
EF0	E of York	Howard (IA), Fillmore (MN)	IA, MN	43.4985°N 92.2599°W	18:49–18:58	6.19 mi (9.96 km)	30 yd (27 m)
EF0	A tornado damaged a few cattle and hog barns, in addition to some trees.						
EF0	SW of Burlington	Des Moines	IA	40.757°N 91.1954°W	19:03–19:05	0.14 mi (0.23 km)	20 yd (18 m)
EF0	A brief tornado was caught on video. No damage occurred.						
EF0	Southern Romeoville	Will	IL	41.6174°N 88.1374°W	19:04–19:14	3.23 mi (5.20 km)	300 yd (270 m)
EF0	A weak tornado produced light roof damage and downed tree limbs in the southern part of Romeoville.						
EF0	S of Dahinda	Knox	IL	40.9093°N 90.1087°W	20:15–20:16	0.08 mi (0.13 km)	10 yd (9.1 m)
EF0	A brief tornado occurred over open fields. No damage occurred.						
EF0	NNE of Fort Morgan	Morgan	CO	40.32°N 103.77°W	21:02–21:03	0.01 mi (0.016 km)	25 yd (23 m)
EF0	A brief tornado occurred over open fields. No damage occurred.						
EF0	ESE of Willard	Logan	CO	40.54°N 103.44°W	21:22–21:23	0.01 mi (0.016 km)	25 yd (23 m)
EF0	A brief tornado occurred over open fields. No damage occurred.						
EF0	SW of Paw Paw	Lee	IL	41.6579°N 89.0466°W	21:27–21:28	0.69 mi (1.11 km)	30 yd (27 m)
EF0	A brief tornado was observed over open fields. No damage occurred.						
EF0	Sauk Village	Cook	IL	41.4825°N 87.5464°W	21:27–21:30	0.84 mi (1.35 km)	50 yd (46 m)
EF0	Some houses in town sustained minor roof damage, and a light pole fell onto a car.						
EF0	Dyer	Lake	IN	41.4924°N 87.5256°W	21:30–21:33	1.05 mi (1.69 km)	100 yd (91 m)
EF0	A brief tornado caused siding and shingle damage to multiple homes in Dyer. Several trees were snapped along the path as well.						
EF0	NW of Benson	Woodford	IL	40.8873°N 89.1621°W	21:38–21:39	0.13 mi (0.21 km)	10 yd (9.1 m)
EF0	A brief tornado occurred over open fields. No known damage occurred.						
EF0	SE of Twin Falls	Elmore	ID	43.12°N 115.41°W	21:40–21:55	0.52 mi (0.84 km)	10 yd (9.1 m)
EF0	Radar and photo evidence were used to confirm a tornado. No known damage occurred.						
EF0	S of Crook	Logan	CO	40.79°N 102.80°W	22:35–22:36	0.01 mi (0.016 km)	25 yd (23 m)
EF0	A brief tornado occurred over open fields. No damage occurred.						
EF0	SW of Marks Butte	Sedgwick	CO	40.79°N 102.55°W	22:44–22:45	0.02 mi (0.032 km)	50 yd (46 m)
EF0	A tornado damaged ten 20,000 US bu (700,000 L) capacity grain bins.						
EF0	S of Lochbuie	Adams	CO	39.99°N 104.72°W	22:53–22:58	0.01 mi (0.016 km)	25 yd (23 m)
EF0	A tornado occurred over open fields. No damage occurred.						
EF0	N of Hudson	Weld	CO	40.09°N 104.64°W	23:04–23:05	0.01 mi (0.016 km)	25 yd (23 m)
EF0	A brief tornado occurred over open fields. No damage occurred.						
EFU	SSW of Clarkville	Yuma	CO	40.36°N 102.63°W	23:25	0.01 mi (0.016 km)	10 yd (9.1 m)
EFU	A weak tornado touched down multiple times over open fields. No damage occurred.						
EF1	NE of Bunker Hill	Miami	IN	40.685°N 86.042°W	23:34–23:38	0.58 mi (0.93 km)	50 yd (46 m)
EF1	Two residences sustained shingle and siding damage. The tornado also bent a television tower and snapped or uprooted numerous trees.						
EF0	SSE of Paoli	Phillips	CO	40.45°N 102.44°W	23:51–23:53	0.01 mi (0.016 km)	25 yd (23 m)
EF0	A brief tornado occurred over open fields. No damage occurred.						
EF3	N of Macy to SSE of Silver Lake	Miami, Fulton	IN	40.981°N 86.1276°W	23:51–00:18	13.72 mi (22.08 km)	800 yd (730 m)
EF3	A strong wedge tornado damaged multiple homes and farmsteads as it passed near Akron. A well-built barn, a machine shed, and several silos were destroyed, and a hog confinement facility suffered extensive damage. A brick home was destroyed, with only a few interior walls left standing and debris scattered downwind. Numerous trees were snapped, a pickup truck was thrown, and two metal truss transmission towers were blown over as well.						
EF2	Pendleton	Madison	IN	39.9985°N 85.7549°W	00:05–00:18	5.89 mi (9.48 km)	100 yd (91 m)
EF2	Many homes sustained roof damage in Pendleton, including three that lost most of or all of their roofs. One of these homes sustained partial collapse of an exterior brick wall. Many large trees in town were snapped or uprooted, power lines were downed, and garages and outbuildings were destroyed as well. One person was injured.						
EF2	SSW of Somerset	Grant	IN	40.637°N 85.846°W	00:10–00:16	4.09 mi (6.58 km)	150 yd (140 m)
EF2	A strong tornado damaged multiple farmsteads. Well-built barns were destroyed with debris scattered hundreds of yards. A garage and several silos were destroyed as well, while a home sustained roof and siding damage.						
EF1	NW of Manchester	Wabash	IN	41.025°N 85.792°W	00:26–00:30	1.9 mi (3.1 km)	50 yd (46 m)
EF1	This tornado damaged one home, largely destroyed a shed, and damaged trees.						
EF1	S of Middletown	Henry	IN	40.033°N 85.531°W	00:29–00:30	0.17 mi (0.27 km)	50 yd (46 m)
EF1	A brief tornado snapped or uprooted numerous large trees.						
EF0	ESE of Holyoke	Phillips	CO	40.52°N 102.60°W	00:31–00:32	0.01 mi (0.016 km)	25 yd (23 m)
EF0	A brief tornado occurred over open fields. No damaged occurred.						
EF1	ESE of Middletown	Henry	IN	40.0523°N 85.4825°W	00:39–00:42	2.45 mi (3.94 km)	200 yd (180 m)
EF1	A tornado snapped or uprooted numerous trees. A few homes sustained roof damage as well.						
EF0	SE of Lamar	Chase	NE	40.54°N 101.94°W	00:43	0.2 mi (0.32 km)	25 yd (23 m)
EF0	A brief tornado occurred over open fields. No damage occurred.						
EF3	N of Roll to S of Nottingham	Wells	IN	40.577°N 85.392°W	00:59–01:23	12.76 mi (20.54 km)	1,200 yd (1,100 m)
EF3	This large and intense tornado passed to the north of Montpelier. Several structures at a dairy farm sustained severe damage, with one well-built metal structure completely destroyed and 170 cows killed at that location. A machine shed was leveled, and a trailer manufacturing warehouse was destroyed. The tornado toppled a metal truss transmission tower to the ground and destroyed a barn as well. Two people were injured.						
EF1	NW of Imperial	Chase	NE	40.59°N 101.73°W	01:23–01:35	5.51 mi (8.87 km)	250 yd (230 m)
EF1	A tornado damaged or overturned multiple irrigation pivots.						
EF0	N of Imperial	Chase	NE	40.6358°N 101.63°W	01:37	0.1 mi (0.16 km)	50 yd (46 m)
EF0	A brief tornado overturned an irrigation pivot.						
EF1	S of Hollansburg	Darke	OH	39.9705°N 84.8105°W	01:48–01:50	1.42 mi (2.29 km)	100 yd (91 m)
EF1	A barn was destroyed and multiple homes sustained minor damage.						
EF0	NNE of Imperial	Chase	NE	40.6671°N 101.5398°W	02:05–02:06	0.2 mi (0.32 km)	25 yd (23 m)
EF0	A brief tornado overturned a center pivot irrigation system.						
EF3	Celina	Mercer	OH	40.5515°N 84.6911°W	02:02–02:17	11 mi (18 km)	250 yd (230 m)
EF3	1 death – See section on this tornado – Eight people were injured.						
EF1	New Madison	Darke	OH	39.9675°N 84.7152°W	02:04–02:06	0.45 mi (0.72 km)	200 yd (180 m)
EF1	Significant portions of roofing were uplifted at a lumber yard storage building. Other structures in New Madison suffered more minor roof damage. A downtown business suffered damage to its front facade, in addition to broken windows and some uplift of its roof. Numerous large tree branches were damaged.						
EF3	SE of Pitsburg to Kessler	Darke, Miami	OH	39.9759°N 84.4679°W	02:25–02:44	10.49 mi (16.88 km)	1,320 yd (1,210 m)
EF3	This large, strong tornado cause severe damage to numerous homes to the north of West Milton and in the small community of Kessler. Numerous homes had their roofs ripped off, and several sustained collapse of exterior walls. A mobile home was completely demolished, and another was overturned, resulting in one injury. Numerous trees were snapped or uprooted, and a full-sized camper was tossed into a garage.						
EF1	W of Wapakoneta	Auglaize	OH	40.5597°N 84.2593°W	02:33–02:35	1.31 mi (2.11 km)	150 yd (140 m)
EF1	Several barns and outbuildings were severely damaged or destroyed. A large portion of one outbuilding was deposited onto an overpass, where a semi-truck crashed into it and the driver was injured. Several homes suffered damage, including one that saw its back room, plumbing fixtures, and a portion of the concrete sub-floor pulled from the main structure. Several trees were snapped. A grain silo was lifted and rolled about 150 yd (140 m).						
EF4	W of Brookville to Dayton to Riverside	Montgomery	OH	39.8243°N 84.4632°W	02:41–03:13	18.17 mi (29.24 km)	1,050 yd (960 m)
EF4	See the article on this tornado – 166 people were injured.						
EF0	SSE of Uniopolis	Auglaize	OH	40.5670°N 84.1095°W	02:47–02:54	3.95 mi (6.36 km)	150 yd (140 m)
EF0	One barn was destroyed and another was damaged with debris being carried over 100 yd (91 m) yards. A small shed and the roof of an outbuilding were damaged, and several trees were snapped or uprooted.						
EF0	S of Troy	Miami	OH	39.9947°N 84.2407°W	02:47–03:03	5.59 mi (9.00 km)	200 yd (180 m)
EF0	Minor tree and roof damage occurred.						
EF0	Waynesfield	Auglaize	OH	40.6051°N 83.9754°W	03:01–03:02	0.22 mi (0.35 km)	30 yd (27 m)
EF0	A brief tornado snapped small trees and damaged ceiling tiles inside the Waynesfield-Goshen High School. The tornado was captured by a security camera as it moved through the school's parking lot.						
EF0	Elizabeth Township	Miami	OH	40.0066°N 84.0594°W	03:08–03:09	1.07 mi (1.72 km)	50 yd (46 m)
EF0	Several trees were snapped or uprooted. Roofing debris from an unknown location was collected in a row of fencing, suggesting minor structural occurred somewhere along the path.						
EF3	Riverside to Beavercreek to N of Xenia	Montgomery, Greene	OH	39.7690°N 84.1092°W	03:12–03:32	9.92 mi (15.96 km)	1,230 yd (1,120 m)
EF3	See the section on this tornado						
EF0	N of Phillipsburg	Miami, Montgomery	OH	39.9266°N 84.4112°W	03:19–03:24	3.05 mi (4.91 km)	50 yd (46 m)
EF0	The tornado caused minor damage to farm equipment. Nearby, roof and tree damage was also observed.						
EF0	NE of Belle Center	Hardin	OH	40.5603°N 83.7127°W	03:28–03:30	2.03 mi (3.27 km)	50 yd (46 m)
EF0	A weak tornado caused mainly tree damage, though a barn had its roof partially removed and doors blown off.						
EF2	ESE of Englewood to Southern Huber Heights	Montgomery	OH	39.8618°N 84.2506°W	03:34–03:45	7.57 mi (12.18 km)	440 yd (400 m)
EF2	This high-end EF2 tornado caused additional major damage in the Dayton metro shortly after the previous EF4 and EF3 moved out of the area. The most severe damage occurred in the Vandalia and Butler Township areas. Numerous homes and apartment buildings were damaged, some which had roofs and exterior walls ripped off. A church and multiple businesses including a sports bar, an entertainment center, a lumber warehouse, and multiple industrial buildings were also heavily damaged. Numerous trees were snapped or uprooted, and vehicles were moved and damaged as well.						
EF0	Superior	Nuckolls	NE	40.027°N 98.0696°W	03:45–03:46	0.01 mi (0.016 km)	75 yd (69 m)
EF0	A detached garage was severely damaged in Superior, with shingle and gutter damage to the adjacent home as well. Fences and trees were damaged throughout the neighborhood.						
EF1	NE of Jamestown	Greene, Fayette	OH	39.7068°N 83.7342°W	03:48–03:57	5.77 mi (9.29 km)	250 yd (230 m)
EF1	Damage was primarily limited to trees. Some homes sustained roof and siding damage and one carport was destroyed.						

=== May 28 event ===
List of confirmed tornadoes – Tuesday, May 28, 2019
EF#	Location	County / Parish	State	Start Coord.	Time (UTC)	Path length	Max width
EF2	NE of Jamestown	Greene	OH	39.6883°N 82.9059°W	04:23–04:32	4.18 mi (6.73 km)	250 yd (230 m)
EF2	This tornado snapped hardwood trees while destroying one residence's shed. Metal from that shed was blown into the surrounding field. The second story of a house had much of its roof removed and had multiple walls collapsed. Farther east, a roof was ripped off a barn and another shed was destroyed.						
EF1	SE of Circleville	Pickaway	OH	39.5491°N 82.935°W	04:57–05:05	3.77 mi (6.07 km)	150 yd (140 m)
EF1	One home had its roof blown off, garage destroyed, and connecting wall to the main house damaged. Another house had a portion of its wall removed, leaving a large hole in the corner of the structure. An outdoor structure was demolished, and another home sustained destruction of its garage. Several other houses suffered minor structural damage. Trees were snapped and uprooted as well.						
EF1	S of Tarlton	Pickaway	OH	39.5157°N 82.7965°W	05:09–05:11	1.64 mi (2.64 km)	75 yd (69 m)
EF1	One home suffered extensive damage, with most of its roof ripped off and several pieces of lumber impaled into the yard. Several other houses suffered roof damage. One house under construction had several of its walls removed, and a barn on the property sustained some roof damage. Several large trees were downed.						
EF2	NE of Laurelville	Hocking	OH	39.5128°N 82.7271°W	05:17–05:28	5.31 mi (8.55 km)	400 yd (370 m)
EF2	One home had its second story and garage completely destroyed. Several other homes sustained lesser structural damage. Significant and severe tree damage was observed, including a few trees that sustained some debarking. A large propane tank was thrown 20–30 ft (6.1–9.1 m), and a 7,000 lb (3,200 kg) truck was tossed into a house. A mobile home was severed in half by a fallen tree.						
EF1	Roseville	Perry, Muskingum	OH	39.8137°N 82.1023°W	05:35–05:38	1.98 mi (3.19 km)	750 yd (690 m)
EF1	Over 90 trees were snapped or uprooted by this high-end EF1 tornado. Several homes in town sustained damage due to fallen trees, and others had shingles and porches ripped off. A tractor trailer was overturned, while a large shed and other outdoor equipment was destroyed. Power poles were snapped as well.						
EF0	NW of Zaleski	Vinton	OH	39.3349°N 82.4358°W	06:30–06:31	0.12 mi (0.19 km)	100 yd (91 m)
EF0	A brief, weak tornado caused minor tree damage.						
EF0	Penn Run	Indiana	PA	40.6131°N 79.0317°W	19:45–19:47	0.26 mi (0.42 km)	30 yd (27 m)
EF0	A brief tornado snapped several trees.						
EF1	ENE of Ulster Township	Bradford	PA	41.8669°N 76.4306°W	20:50–20:57	3.2 mi (5.1 km)	200 yd (180 m)
EF1	Several hardwood trees were snapped and several homes were damaged. A trailer was overturned and dragged as well.						
EF0	SE of Jamesburg	Vermilion	IL	40.234°N 87.7104°W	21:06–21:07	0.16 mi (0.26 km)	10 yd (9.1 m)
EF0	A trained storm spotter sighted a tornado in an open field. No damage was reported.						
EF0	SE of Kinsley	Ellis	KS	37.7582°N 99.3135°W	21:15–21:18	0.14 mi (0.23 km)	25 yd (23 m)
EF0	A storm chaser reported a landspout tornado. No damage was reported.						
EF2	Morgantown	Lancaster, Berks	PA	40.1589°N 75.91°W	21:52–22:00	3.08 mi (4.96 km)	400 yd (370 m)
EF2	Near the beginning of the path, a turkey barn had its metal roof torn off, killing 40 turkeys. At a nearby farm, outbuildings were severely damaged or destroyed, a tractor trailer was overturned and dragged 40 ft (12 m), and a house had its porch and part of its roof ripped off. The tornado then moved through Morgantown, where a fitness center sustained heavy roof damage, and several other businesses were also damaged in the downtown area. Numerous homes were damaged, a few of which had large sections of roofs or exterior walls ripped off. Several vehicles were flipped of tossed, and numerous trees were snapped or uprooted, some of which landed on structures. A small shed was obliterated as well.						
EFU	S of Osage City	Osage	KS	38.5432°N 95.82°W	22:10–22:11	0.5 mi (0.80 km)	25 yd (23 m)
EFU	Law enforcement reported a tornado in a field. No damage was observed.						
EF0	Falls Township	Wyoming	PA	41.4849°N 75.8712°W	22:10–22:13	1.58 mi (2.54 km)	75 yd (69 m)
EF0	Dozens of trees were snapped or uprooted, and a utility pole was snapped as well. A resident outside their home during the tornado suffered minor injuries from flying debris.						
EF1	SW of Waverly Township	Lackawanna	PA	41.4606°N 75.7898°W	22:18–22:21	0.79 mi (1.27 km)	125 yd (114 m)
EF1	A barn was unroofed and a church was damaged. Several homes and sheds were also damaged.						
EF2	W of Waldo to S of Tipton	Russell, Osborne, Mitchell	KS	39.1135°N 98.8505°W	22:20–23:03	24.41 mi (39.28 km)	880 yd (800 m)
EF2	A large tornado destroyed a grain bin, outbuildings, and sheds at three farmsteads. Power poles and trees were snapped, and a grain cart was thrown and overturned.						
EF2	SE of Overbrook to Lone Star Lake	Osage, Douglas	KS	38.7541°N 95.5186°W	22:49–23:06	10.69 mi (17.20 km)	200 yd (180 m)
EF2	This tornado merged with the following EF4 tornado as it formed near Lone Star Lake. It snapped numerous trees, collapsed a garage, destroyed a fence, and damaged outbuildings. A few homes and street signs sustained minor damage as well. The tornado impacted vehicles as it moved over roadways, injuring 12 people.						
EF0	NW of Sprague River	Klamath	OR	42.5°N 121.64°W	22:55–23:01	0.01 mi (0.016 km)	10 yd (9.1 m)
EF0	A member of the public videoed a brief tornado. No known damage occurred.						
EF4	Lone Star Lake to Linwood to W of Bonner Springs	Douglas, Leavenworth	KS	38.8381°N 95.3665°W	23:05–00:00	29.07 mi (46.78 km)	1,760 yd (1,610 m)
EF4	See the article on this tornado – 18 people were injured.						
EFU	N of Yocemento	Ellis	KS	38.9393°N 99.4251°W	23:40–23:43	1.32 mi (2.12 km)	50 yd (46 m)
EFU	A trained storm spotter reported a tornado. No known damage occurred.						
EF1	Stanhope	Sussex	NJ	40.92°N 74.70°W	00:30–00:31	1.25 mi (2.01 km)	350 yd (320 m)
EF1	Numerous trees were snapped or uprooted, and several homes and cars were damaged by fallen trees.						
EF2	SSE of Kearney	Clay	MO	39.3416°N 94.3335°W	00:58–01:20	5.85 mi (9.41 km)	400 yd (370 m)
EF2	A house had its roof ripped off, and sustained some collapse of exterior walls. A few other homes sustained minor to moderate roof damage. Trees and power poles were snapped, and an outbuilding was destroyed as well.						

=== May 29 event ===
List of confirmed tornadoes – Wednesday, May 29, 2019
EF#	Location	County / Parish	State	Start Coord.	Time (UTC)	Path length	Max width
EF1	NE of Miner	Scott	MO	36.9167°N 89.5213°W	13:44–13:46	0.97 mi (1.56 km)	75 yd (69 m)
EF1	One home was substantially damaged, with a large section of its roof ripped off and its siding damaged. Several smaller outbuildings, porches, and other structures had portions of their roofs and walls damaged as well. A couple dozen trees were snapped or uprooted. Outside equipment such as pools, swing sets, and fences were displaced.						
EF0	ESE of Whitneyville	Tioga	PA	41.7701°N 77.1852°W	18:07–18:08	1.05 mi (1.69 km)	50 yd (46 m)
EF0	Significant damage to a barn, a trampoline, and trees occurred.						
EF0	SE of Eagle Mountain	Tarrant	TX	32.8667°N 97.4199°W	18:19–18:26	3.87 mi (6.23 km)	200 yd (180 m)
EF0	A home was damaged in the Villages of Eagle Mountain subdivision. In the Saginaw area, trees were snapped and business signs and power poles were bent.						
EF0	SW of Krum	Denton	TX	33.2571°N 97.2409°W	18:22–18:31	3.72 mi (5.99 km)	250 yd (230 m)
EF0	Tree and isolated power line damage occurred in the Krum area.						
EF1	SSE of Haslet	Tarrant	TX	32.9115°N 97.3065°W	18:31–18:34	0.45 mi (0.72 km)	300 yd (270 m)
EF1	A brief tornado caused damage to an eight-block area in a subdivision, resulting in loss of roof cover and broken windows at multiple homes.						
EF0	Lower Milford Township	Lehigh, Bucks	PA	40.4468°N 75.4877°W	19:14–19:21	2.3 mi (3.7 km)	50 yd (46 m)
EF0	Trees were snapped or uprooted by the tornado, and one home sustained roof damage from a fallen tree.						
EF0	Dushore	Sullivan	PA	41.5345°N 76.3695°W	19:20–19:22	0.42 mi (0.68 km)	50 yd (46 m)
EF0	Significant tree damage occurred.						
EF0	E of Rockwall	Rockwall	TX	32.9247°N 96.44°W	19:58–20:03	3.06 mi (4.92 km)	25 yd (23 m)
EF0	A tornado caused damage to an athletic complex, where minor damage was inflicted to the site facilities. The tornado later passed through the Rockwall Municipal Airport without causing damage.						
EF0	SSW of Canton	Van Zandt	TX	32.4897°N 95.8883°W	20:07–20:14	2.96 mi (4.76 km)	100 yd (91 m)
EF0	A home sustained shingle damage, and tree branches were broken.						
EF1	ESE of Newport	Perry	PA	40.4411°N 77.1084°W	20:14–20:19	4.93 mi (7.93 km)	300 yd (270 m)
EF1	Hundreds of trees were snapped or downed, including one that fell on a pickup truck. Tree limbs were downed onto house roofs as well.						
EFU	NE of Canton	Van Zandt	TX	32.589°N 95.83°W	20:17–20:18	0.24 mi (0.39 km)	50 yd (46 m)
EFU	Debris was lofted by a tornado at an intersection traversed by a 2017 tornado, making its path difficult to assess.						
EF1	NE of Wells Tannery	Fulton	PA	40.0928°N 78.1437°W	20:24–20:25	0.72 mi (1.16 km)	50 yd (46 m)
EF1	A roof was torn off of a barn and a house sustained roof damage. Dozens of trees were blown down as well.						
EF1	Matamoras	Dauphin	PA	40.44°N 76.9349°W	20:24–20:28	2.45 mi (3.94 km)	350 yd (320 m)
EF1	Many trees were snapped or uprooted in the Matamoras community.						
EF0	SW of Yantis	Wood	TX	32.8777°N 95.6344°W	20:36–20:45	3.36 mi (5.41 km)	100 yd (91 m)
EF0	The tin sheeting on a trailer was peeled off by the tornado. Trees were also uprooted and limbs were downed.						
EFU	SSW of Schaller	Sac	IA	42.4062°N 95.3184°W	21:00–21:06	1.23 mi (1.98 km)	30 yd (27 m)
EFU	A tornado remained over open farmland. No damage occurred.						
EFU	S of Early	Sac	IA	42.4332°N 95.1593°W	21:11–21:14	0.65 mi (1.05 km)	20 yd (18 m)
EFU	A tornado was photographed multiple times. No damage was reported.						
EF0	SW of Millerton	McCurtain	OK	33.9471°N 95.0533°W	21:21–21:22	1.06 mi (1.71 km)	75 yd (69 m)
EF0	Storm spotters reported a brief tornado over open pasture. No damage occurred.						
EF2	NW of Mabank	Kaufman	TX	32.3683°N 96.2125°W	21:24–21:30	4.01 mi (6.45 km)	215 yd (197 m)
EF2	Along the Cedar Creek Reservoir, numerous trees were snapped or uprooted. A home had much of its roof torn off, and several other houses sustained lesser roof damage. One person was injured.						
EF0	NNW of Stonington	Christian	IL	39.6928°N 89.2137°W	21:28–21:30	0.23 mi (0.37 km)	20 yd (18 m)
EF0	A landspout tornado caused no damage.						
EF0	N of Edinburg	Christian	IL	39.7369°N 89.3935°W	21:30–21:32	0.23 mi (0.37 km)	20 yd (18 m)
EF0	A landspout tornado caused no damage.						
EF0	NE of Stonington	Christian	IL	39.6887°N 89.1509°W	21:35–21:38	0.29 mi (0.47 km)	20 yd (18 m)
EF0	A landspout tornado caused no damage.						
EFU	N of Pocahontas	Pocahontas	IA	42.7609°N 94.6667°W	21:49–21:56	0.22 mi (0.35 km)	40 yd (37 m)
EFU	A storm chaser reported a tornado over open cropland. No damage occurred.						
EF0	E of Blue Mound	Macon	IL	39.7001°N 89.0824°W	21:50–21:56	0.46 mi (0.74 km)	20 yd (18 m)
EF0	A landspout tornado caused no damage.						
EF2	WSW of Canton	Van Zandt	TX	32.4831°N 96.0012°W	21:51–22:00	7.24 mi (11.65 km)	700 yd (640 m)
EF2	A large tornado damaged several homes, causing significant roof loss. A manufactured home was destroyed and displaced far from its foundation. Trees were snapped or uprooted as well.						
EF2	E of Winnsboro	Wood, Franklin	TX	32.9229°N 95.2473°W	21:50–22:12	9.07 mi (14.60 km)	850 yd (780 m)
EF2	A strong tornado snapped and uprooted trees, lifted the roof off a manufactured home, and damaged or destroyed outbuildings. A large poultry barn was completely destroyed as well.						
EF1	Canton	Van Zandt	TX	32.5447°N 95.8844°W	22:08–22:15	2.33 mi (3.75 km)	140 yd (130 m)
EF1	Widespread tree damage occurred in Canton, including one tree that fell onto a vehicle. In the downtown area, several businesses suffered roof and structural damage. A gas station was damaged, and sheet metal was thrown into power lines.						
EF0	NNE of Ravenden	Randolph	AR	36.2724°N 91.2288°W	22:16–22:20	0.62 mi (1.00 km)	75 yd (69 m)
EF0	A brief tornado damaged a mobile home and an outbuilding, as well as adjacent trees.						
EF1	NE of Canton	Van Zandt	TX	32.5804°N 95.8161°W	22:18–22:23	3.81 mi (6.13 km)	250 yd (230 m)
EF1	Damage from this tornado was primarily limited to vegetation. Minor property damage occurred near the end of the path.						
EF0	NW of Leonard	Fannin	TX	33.4171°N 96.2788°W	22:31–22:47	10.84 mi (17.45 km)	300 yd (270 m)
EF0	A tornado was embedded within a 25 mi (40 km) swath of straight-line wind damage with winds up to 100 mph (160 km/h). The tornado itself produced winds estimated at 80 mph (130 km/h), causing minor structural damage to homes and outbuildings, in addition to snapping and uprooting several trees.						
EFU	SE of Bradgate	Humboldt	IA	42.7903°N 94.3984°W	23:21–23:24	0.54 mi (0.87 km)	30 yd (27 m)
EFU	A tornado was videoed in open rural areas. No damage occurred.						
EF0	SE of Victor	Iowa	IA	41.7147°N 92.2711°W	23:23–23:24	0.07 mi (0.11 km)	20 yd (18 m)
EF0	A tornado confirmed via video remained in open fields and caused no damage.						
EF1	NNE of Barnes City	Poweshiek	IA	41.5295°N 92.4557°W	00:01–00:14	3.52 mi (5.66 km)	50 yd (46 m)
EF1	An old barn was destroyed and trees were damaged at one farmstead. A large hoop building was damaged at a second farmstead. One person was injured.						
EFU	NE of Deep River	Poweshiek	IA	41.5904°N 92.3593°W	00:28–00:32	0.9 mi (1.4 km)	30 yd (27 m)
EFU	Law enforcement reported a tornado in farmland. No damage occurred.						
EF0	ESE of Garden City	Hardin	IA	42.2283°N 93.3402°W	00:37–00:41	1.11 mi (1.79 km)	30 yd (27 m)
EF0	Minor tree damage occurred at one farmstead.						
EFU	SE of Guernsey	Poweshiek	IA	41.623°N 92.3183°W	00:39–00:43	0.95 mi (1.53 km)	30 yd (27 m)
EFU	Storm chasers videoed a tornado in open farmland. No damage occurred.						
EF0	E of Guernsey	Iowa	IA	41.6435°N 92.2633°W	00:46–00:58	3.34 mi (5.38 km)	20 yd (18 m)
EF0	A tornado caused minor tree damage.						
EF0	NW of Kalona	Johnson	IA	41.5137°N 91.7923°W	01:13–01:14	0.3 mi (0.48 km)	20 yd (18 m)
EF0	This tornado caused minor tree damage.						
EF0	E of New Providence	Hardin	IA	42.2815°N 93.1329°W	01:15–01:19	1.23 mi (1.98 km)	30 yd (27 m)
EF0	Minor tree damage occurred.						
EF0	SW of Eldora	Hardin	IA	42.3351°N 93.1413°W	01:29–01:31	0.57 mi (0.92 km)	40 yd (37 m)
EF0	The roof was ripped off a barn.						
EF0	WNW of Owasa	Hardin	IA	42.4493°N 93.252°W	01:31–01:36	1.33 mi (2.14 km)	50 yd (46 m)
EF0	A barn and some trees were damaged.						
EFU	E of Steamboat Rock	Hardin	IA	42.4108°N 93.0399°W	01:54–01:56	0.66 mi (1.06 km)	20 yd (18 m)
EFU	Trained storm spotters videoed a tornado. No damage occurred.						

=== May 30 event ===
List of confirmed tornadoes – Thursday, May 30, 2019
EF#	Location	County / Parish	State	Start Coord.	Time (UTC)	Path length	Max width
EF0	ENE of Ballenger Creek	Frederick	MD	39.383°N 77.382°W	18:48–18:59	6.5 mi (10.5 km)	75 yd (69 m)
EF0	Trees were snapped and uprooted along the tornado's path. No structural damage occurred.						
EF1	WSW of Glenelg	Howard	MD	39.258°N 77.027°W	19:20–19:27	4.49 mi (7.23 km)	100 yd (91 m)
EF1	Sections of roof decking was ripped from homes, trees were snapped or uprooted, and power lines were downed. Loose outdoor objects were tossed hundreds of feet. A highway maintenance facility had its tin roofing removed, sustained damage to its roof framing, had a large section of fabric ripped from a salt dome, and had its garage bay doors destroyed. Outside fencing was damaged, and a section of barn roofing was removed before the tornado lifted.						
EF0	ESE of Crownpoint	McKinley	NM	35.6°N 107.9°W	19:42–19:45	0.42 mi (0.68 km)	30 yd (27 m)
EF0	A landspout tornado was observed by the public. No damage occurred.						

== See also ==
- Tornadoes of 2019
- List of United States tornadoes in May 2019
