= Tornado outbreak of May 25–30, 2019 =

Weather event in the United States

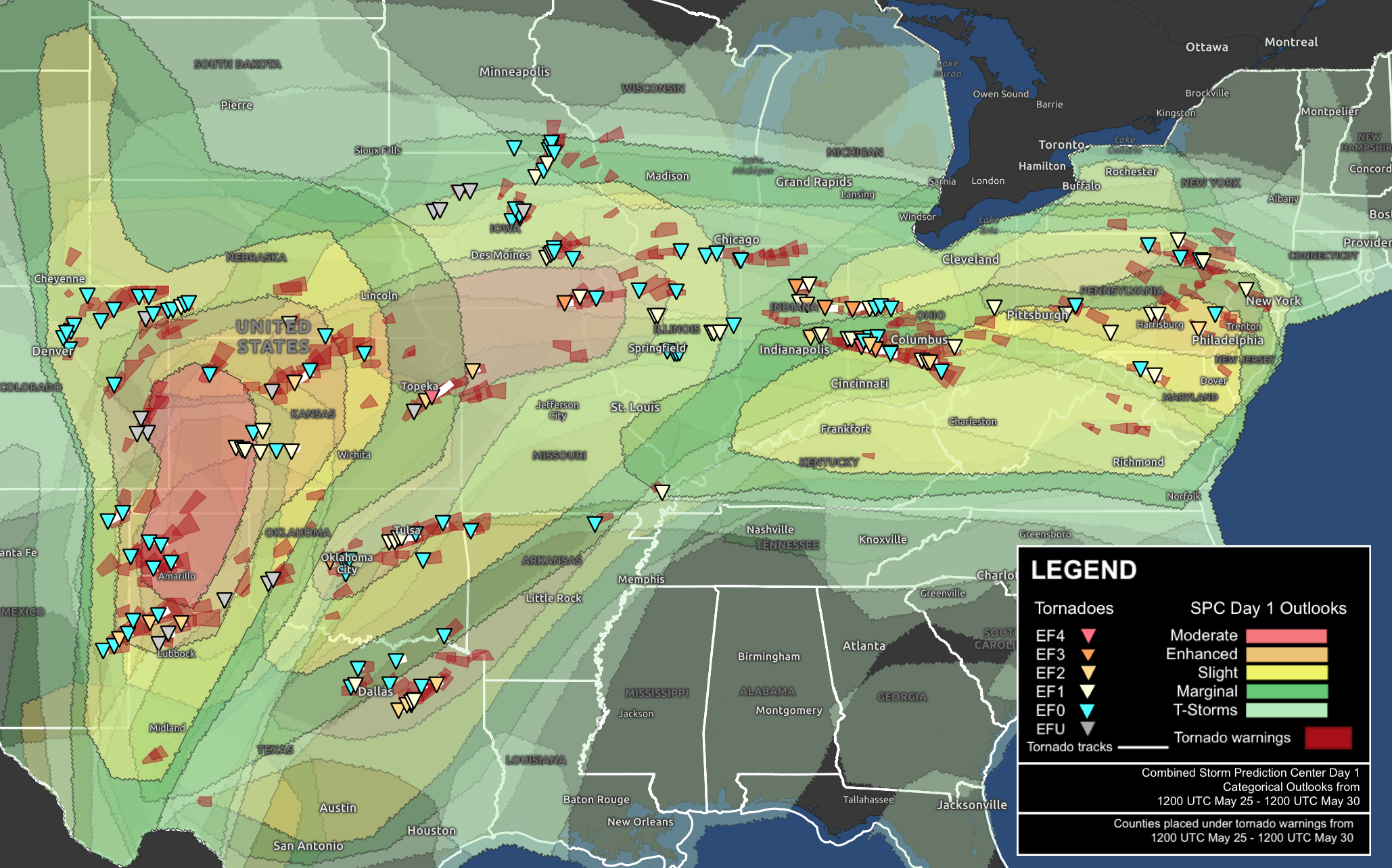
- Map of tornadoes and counties placed under tornado warnings from May 25–30

Meteorological history
- Duration: May 25–30, 2019

Tornado outbreak
- Tornadoes: 182
- Max. rating: EF4 tornado
- Duration: 4 days, 21 hours, 46 minutes
- Highest winds: Tornadic – 170 mph (270 km/h) (Dayton, Ohio EF4 on May 27, Linwood, Kansas EF4 on May 28)*; *A 190 mph (310 km/h) gust was measured by a rocket
- Highest gusts: Non-tornadic — 90 mph (140 km/h) near Kalvesta, Kansas on May 26
- Largest hail: 4.00 in (10.2 cm) in Pine Village, Indiana on May 27

Overall effects
- Fatalities: 3 (+1 non-tornadic)
- Injuries: 239
- Damage: $4.53 billion (2019 USD)
- Areas affected: Great Plains, Midwestern United States, Eastern United States, Atlantic Canada
- Part of the Tornadoes of 2019

From May 25–30, 2019, a significant and deadly tornado outbreak took place across the Great Plains, Ohio Valley and parts of the Northeastern United States. Approximately 182 tornadoes touched down over a five-day period, two of which were violent. It was the final significant outbreak during the month of May, coming days after a similarly large and deadly outbreak impacted areas further west. Following two days of significant tornadoes within the Central Plains, the Storm Prediction Center (SPC) first noted the possibility for an outbreak in the Ohio Valley on May 27 with a 10% hatched region for tornadoes. A large outbreak of strong to violent tornadoes impacted the region that night, including an EF3 tornado that caused severe damage in Celina, Ohio, killing one person there and injuring eight others. Dayton, Ohio and its surrounding suburbs were hit by EF4, EF3, and EF2 tornadoes in quick succession, resulting in widespread major damage throughout the metro area, and at least 166 injuries. On May 28, the SPC issued a moderate risk of severe weather for portions of Nebraska and Kansas, where a violent, rain-wrapped EF4 wedge tornado impacted the outskirts of Lawrence and Linwood, Kansas, destroying many homes and injuring 18 people. The damaging series of tornadoes that occurred in Indiana and Ohio on the evening of May 27 during this event is sometimes locally referred to as the Memorial Day tornado outbreak of 2019, which became the fourth costliest weather event in Ohio history. The near continuous stream of systems also produced widespread flash and river flooding, along with damaging winds and large hail.

As the outbreak occurred within a broader period of significant tornado activity during the month of May, on May 29, the U.S. had its 13th straight day with at least eight tornadoes, which broke the previous record of 11 days straight set in 1980. On the day when the record was broken, the U.S. had an average of 27.5 tornadoes per day during the period.

The thunderstorms associated with this outbreak also produced frequent heavy rainfall, sometimes at record levels, on previously saturated ground across the U.S. and eastern Canada. This resulted in widespread river and lakeshore flooding and flash flooding, which frequently interfered with emergency crews responding to tornado damage, and also interfered with National Weather Service damage surveys. The new precipitation also extended existing flooding along the Mississippi River system to record durations.

Overall, three people were confirmed to have died from tornadoes as a result of the outbreak, with one fatality being attributed to non-tornadic effects. 239 people were injured in some degree, while total damages were estimated to be approximately $4.53 billion (2019 USD).

== Meteorological synopsis ==
=== May 25 ===
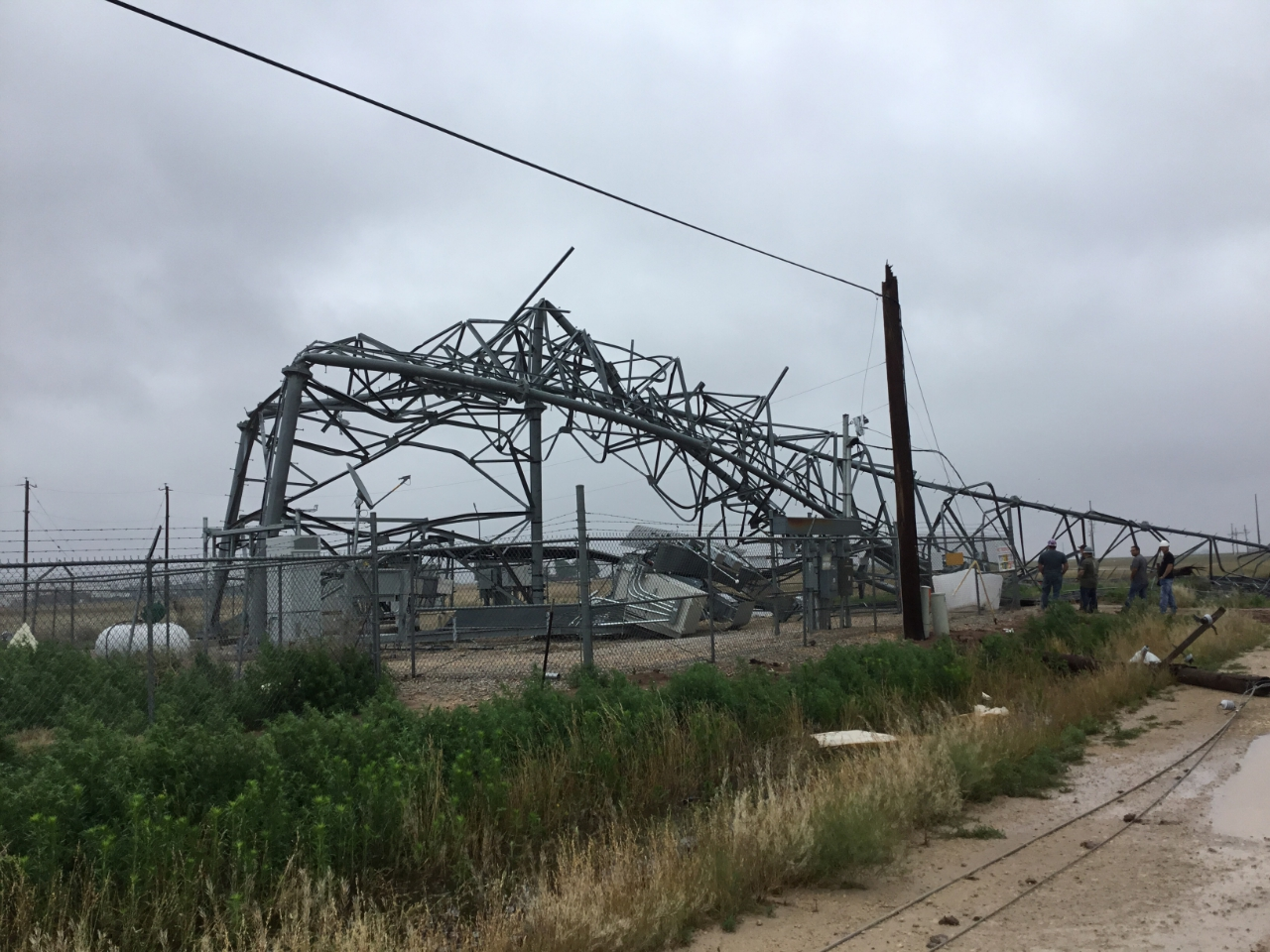
EF2 damage to a cell phone tower in Plainview, Texas

As persistent southwesterly mid-level flow continued to engulf the Central Plains, the SPC once again warned of the potential for widespread severe weather, outlining the Texas Panhandle, western Oklahoma, and southern Kansas in an enhanced risk. This included a 10% risk of tornadoes. An area of low pressure was expected to progress over the southern High Plains, supporting a southward-extending dryline and a northeast-extending cold front to the Iowa–Missouri border. Within the warm sector, mid-level CAPE values were forecast to rise upwards of 2,000–3000 J/kg, with dewpoints in the mid-60s °F as far west as eastern New Mexico. Thunderstorms began developing along the dryline in eastern New Mexico and western Texas around noon local time, though these storms were not tornadic in nature in the absence of strong low-level shear. By the late afternoon, more transient supercell structures had become apparent, leading to a few tornadoes across the Texas Panhandle. One such tornado was rated an EF2 as it struck the north edge of Plainview, Texas, destroying outbuildings, a mobile home, and a cell phone tower. Several weak tornadoes also occurred across the Ohio Valley, where a well-defined shortwave trough combined with abundant moisture and sufficient instability to produce supercell thunderstorms. This included an EF1 tornado that caused moderate damage in Carrollton, Ohio. Hundreds of damaging wind reports were received as well. Through the evening, earlier discrete activity across Texas and Oklahoma congealed into an organized mesoscale convective system. Weak mid-level winds were expected to mitigate the tornado risk, owing to a severe thunderstorm watch across central Kansas down into central Oklahoma. However, as squall line approached Oklahoma City, multiple areas of rotation unexpectedly began to form within the line. At 10:28 p.m. CDT, a low-end EF3 tornado embedded in the squall line moved through southern sections of El Reno, Oklahoma, causing severe damage, killing two people and injuring 29 others. Several other weak tornadoes also touched down around the Oklahoma City metropolitan area. A total of 17 tornadoes were confirmed.

=== May 26 ===
Into the morning of May 26, the mesoscale convective system continued to push across eastern Oklahoma, leading to two simultaneous, large EF1 tornadoes in Sapulpa. These weak, but wide tornadoes caused widespread damage to trees, power poles, homes, and businesses in town. Into the afternoon, a concentrated risk for severe weather was once again expected to exist across the Central and South Plains. Several days of convection had eroded the elevated mixed layer throughout the region, but broad and intensifying southwesterly flow across northern Mexico was expected to reinvigorate this plume. Underneath the potent mid-level flow, rich low-level moisture was forecast to surge into western Kansas and eastern Colorado while mid-level CAPE values were projected to top 3,000 J/kg. While initiation of thunderstorms was expected in the early afternoon (with the threat for large hail being the primary threat initially in the presence of weak low-level wind shear), more expansive cloud cover and a stronger cap delayed initiation. Later in the day, a cluster of storms formed across portions of Nebraska and Kansas, with a severe squall line taking shape farther south across the Texas and Oklahoma panhandles as stronger upper-level winds arrived. Numerous tornadoes were reported throughout the area, most of which were weak. The most significant event of the day was a large, EF2 stovepipe tornado that passed near the town of Dora, New Mexico. The tornado damaged two homes, snapped numerous power poles, and completely destroyed a barn. Another EF2 tornado downed electrical transmission lines near Earth, Texas, as well. A total of 35 tornadoes were confirmed.

=== May 27 ===
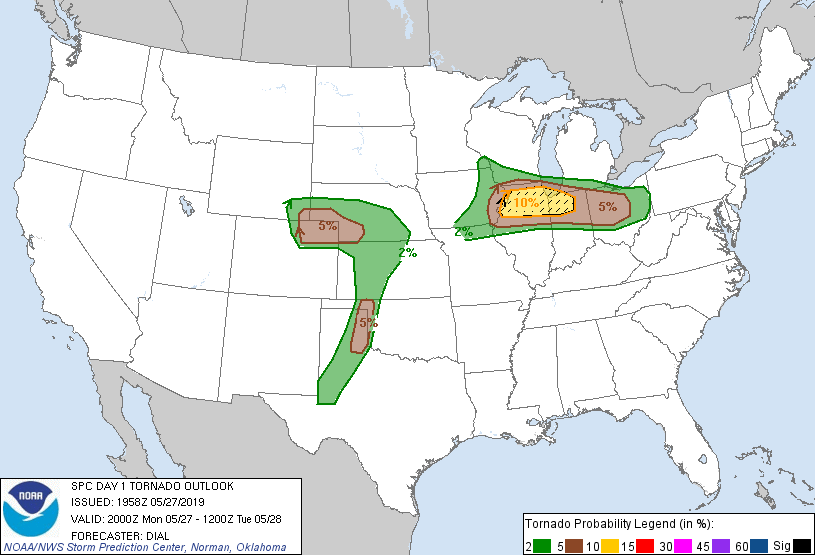
SPC tornado outlook for the afternoon of May 27 (20:00 UTC)

As a strengthening mid-level westerly flow moved over the Midwest, the SPC issued an enhanced risk of severe weather at 0600 UTC, including at 10% risk of tornadoes that outlined the northern region of Illinois. At 1300 UTC, the risk was upgraded to feature the possibility of significant tornadoes, while still retaining its 10% probability. A lesser threat of tornadoes also existed in far western portions of Nebraska and northeast portions of Wyoming, as a prominent upper trough shifted east-northeastward from the Four Corners area into the High Plains. Significant tornado activity began early in the day, with an EF3 tornado that passed near Cantril, Iowa, destroying a farmhouse and a hunting cabin. A high-end EF1 tornado also impacted the western fringes of Charles City, causing heavy damage to buildings at the local fairgrounds, a fertilizer plant, and a few homes. Throughout the afternoon, there was increasing concern over the possibility of strong tornadoes impacting the Chicago metropolitan area. Supercell thunderstorms developed in northern Illinois, and three tornadoes moved through the eastern suburbs of Chicago. However, these tornadoes were weak and only caused minor damage. As the supercells pushed into Indiana, strong tornadoes began touching down, including an EF2 that caused significant damage to homes and trees in the town of Pendleton. A large EF3 wedge tornado destroyed a house, multiple metal truss transmission towers, and several outbuildings near Akron. Another EF3 tornado passed near Montpelier, destroying a trailer manufacturing warehouse, and severely damaging a dairy farm, killing numerous cows.

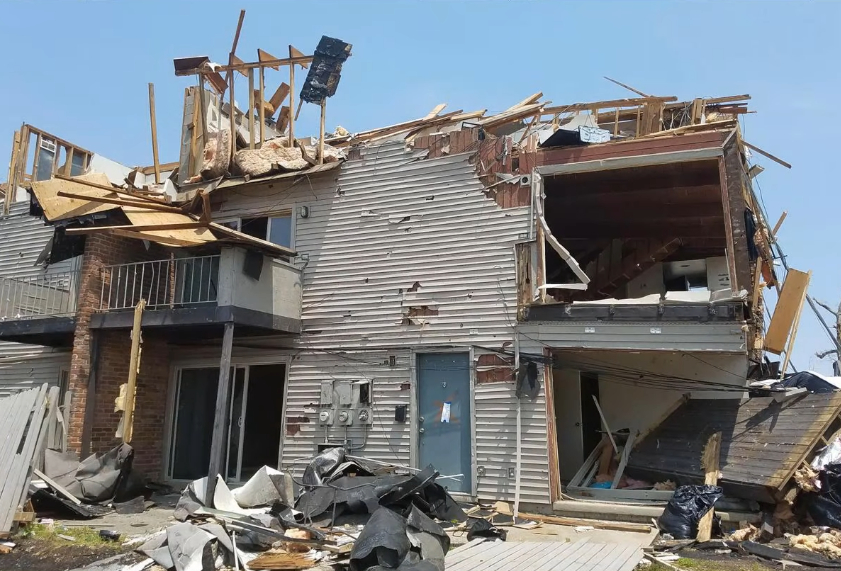
Low-end EF4 damage to an apartment building in Dayton, Ohio.

Tornado activity was expected to lessen after dark as the storms crossed into Ohio. However, unexpectedly high CAPE, shear, and helicity was in place in the region, and the activity only intensified as numerous tornadic supercells overspread the state, producing numerous intense tornadoes. An EF3 tornado destroyed numerous homes in Celina, Ohio, and killed one person, while another EF3 tornado passed north of West Milton and through the small community of Kessler, damaging or destroying many homes and outbuildings. The most significant event of the night occurred when Dayton, Ohio and its surrounding suburbs were struck by three powerful tornadoes in quick succession, with the tornadoes rated EF4, EF3, and high-end EF2 in intensity. Widespread major damage to numerous homes, businesses, apartments, industrial buildings, and other structures occurred throughout the Dayton metro. Remarkably, no direct fatalities occurred in the Dayton area, though at least 166 people were injured. May 27 was the most active day for tornadoes during the outbreak sequence, with a total of 59 confirmed tornadoes.

=== May 28 ===
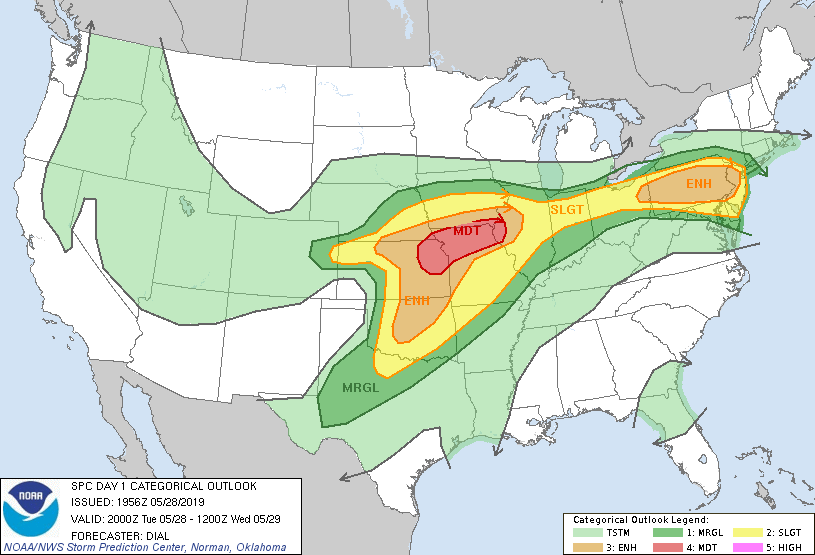
SPC Day 1 categorical outlook issued at 20z on May 28

Tornado activity that began in Ohio on the evening of May 27 continued into the early morning of May 28. An EF2 tornado passed near Jamestown, Ohio, severely damaging a house and destroying outbuildings. Another EF2 tornado passed near Laurelville, causing significant damage to homes and trees, and tossing a propane tank and a truck. A high-end EF1 tornado also struck Roseville, downing numerous trees and power poles, and damaging several homes.

Later that morning, the SPC issued an enhanced risk for severe weather at 0600 UTC; denoting a 10% risk of significant tornadoes along the Missouri and Iowa border as well as parts of Kansas, Nebraska, and Illinois. At 1300 UTC the SPC upgraded the risk to moderate for a 15% chance of significant tornadoes, namely around the MO/KS/NE borders; with a 10% chance of tornadoes extending southward to include much of eastern Kansas. By 2000 UTC the SPC had downgraded the forecast for significant tornadoes to 10%, but this time including Kansas City as the risk was shifted southward due to a stubborn cold front to the north. Further east, an enhanced risk was in place across most of Pennsylvania, along with part of Ohio and New Jersey. This eastern risk area included a 5% risk of tornadoes. Later that afternoon, an EF2 tornado moved through Morgantown, Pennsylvania, damaging numerous homes, businesses, and vehicles. Later that evening, a large EF4 wedge tornado grazed the southeastern edge of Lawrence, Kansas, before impacting the western fringes of Linwood, destroying numerous homes and agricultural buildings, debarking and denuding many trees, and injuring 18 people. Further west, a large EF2 tornado passed near Waldo and Tipton, Kansas, snapping trees and power poles, and damaging several farms. Another EF2 tornado occurred near Kearney, Missouri, and damaged a few homes, one of which sustained roof and exterior wall loss. A total of 27 tornadoes were confirmed.

=== May 29–30 ===
On the morning of May 29, the SPC issued an enhanced risk of severe weather for eastern Texas, along with parts of Arkansas and Missouri. This included a 10% risk of tornadoes. An enhanced risk severe weather was also in place across Maryland, along with parts of Pennsylvania and New Jersey, including a 5% risk of tornadoes. An EF2 tornado ripped much of the roof off a house near Mabank, Texas, snapped or uprooted numerous trees, and injured one person. Another large EF2 tornado caused significant damage to homes outside of Canton, Texas. After the initial Canton tornado dissipated, an EF1 tornado touched down and moved through downtown Canton, causing considerable damage to businesses. Near Winnsboro, Texas, a third EF2 tornado downed many trees, caused significant damage to outbuildings, and destroyed a large poultry barn. Several weak tornadoes also occurred in the eastern part of the United States that afternoon and evening. A total of 42 tornadoes were confirmed. The following day, two weak tornadoes caused minor to moderate damage in Maryland. A weak landspout tornado remained over open country near Crownpoint, New Mexico, causing no damage before the outbreak sequence came to an end.

== Confirmed tornadoes ==
Confirmed tornadoes by Enhanced Fujita rating
| EFU | EF0 | EF1 | EF2 | EF3 | EF4 | EF5 | Total |
|---|---|---|---|---|---|---|---|
| 19 | 95 | 44 | 15 | 7 | 2 | 0 | 182 |

=== El Reno, Oklahoma ===
El Reno, Oklahoma
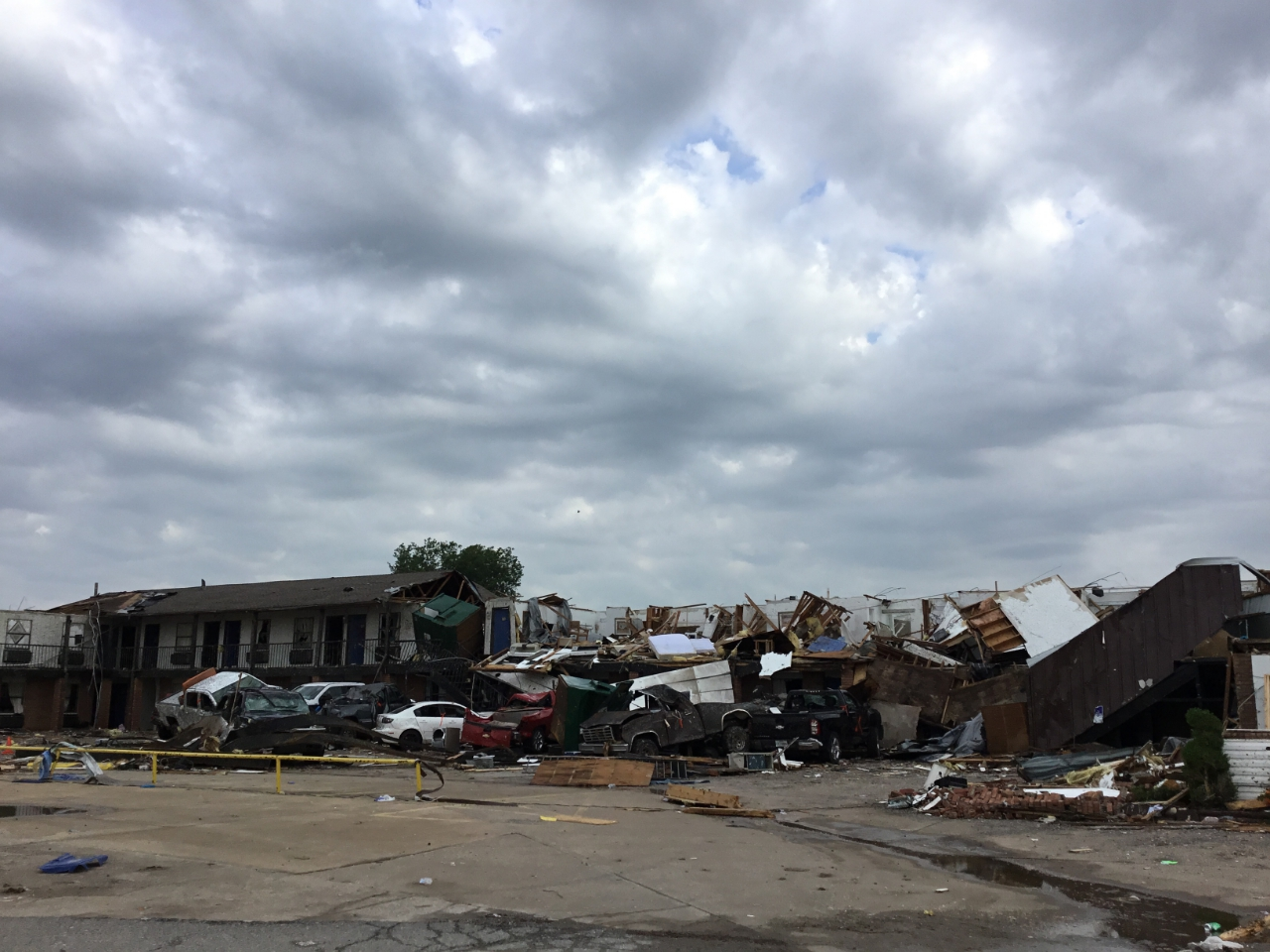
- EF3 damage to the Budget Value Inn motel in El Reno, Oklahoma. Note the metal dumpster deposited on the second floor.

Meteorological history
- Formed: May 25, 2019, 10:28 p.m. CDT (UTC–05:00)
- Dissipated: May 25, 2019, 10:32 p.m. CDT (UTC–05:00)
- Duration: 4 minutes

EF3 tornado
- on the Enhanced Fujita scale
- Highest winds: 145 mph (233 km/h)

Overall effects
- Fatalities: 2
- Injuries: 29
- Damage: $400,000 (2019 USD)

At 10:28 p.m. CDT on May 25, this small but intense QLCS tornado touched down just south of I-40 on the south side of El Reno, Oklahoma. The tornado inflicted EF0 damage to a gas facility along South Choctaw Avenue before crossing the I-40. Reaching high-end EF1 intensity, the tornado struck the Diffee Ford Lincoln car dealership as it continued to the northeast. Multiple cars were flipped and moved at this location, and a large metal auto service building was badly damaged. The tornado then strengthened further, widening and intensifying to high-end EF2 strength as it tore through the Skyview Mobile Home Park. Multiple tied-down mobile homes were thrown and completely destroyed at this location, with large amounts of debris strewn throughout the area. Reaching its peak intensity, the tornado then struck the nearby Budget Value Inn motel at low-end EF3 strength. The second floor of the motel was almost completely destroyed, with numerous walls collapsed. A large metal dumpster was thrown and deposited on the second floor of the hotel, and cars in the parking lot were pushed into a pile and damaged as well. The tornado then weakened back to EF2 intensity as it crossed US 81, inflicting major structural damage to another car dealership, and damaging numerous cars in the sales lot. Power poles were snapped, and several metal light poles were bent to the ground as well. Weakening further to EF1 strength, the tornado narrowed and moved along a more due-easterly path, damaging trees and tearing part of the roof from a home along Southeast 27th Street. A few tree limbs were snapped at EF0 intensity at South Alfadale Road before the tornado lifted and dissipated.

Two deaths were confirmed as a result of this tornado, along with 29 injuries. The tornado was rated low-end EF3, with a peak width of 75 yards (69 m) and a path length of 2.2 miles (3.5 km). Both of the fatalities occurred at the mobile home park. After the tornado, parts of US 81 closed.

=== Celina, Ohio ===
Celina, Ohio
Meteorological history
- Formed: May 27, 2019, 10:02 p.m. EDT (UTC–04:00)
- Dissipated: May 27, 2019, 10:17 p.m. EDT (UTC–04:00)
- Duration: 15 minutes

EF3 tornado
- on the Enhanced Fujita scale
- Highest winds: 150 mph (240 km/h)

Overall effects
- Fatalities: 1
- Injuries: 8

A strong and damaging EF3 tornado moved through the town of Celina on the evening of May 27. The tornado originally touched down west of the town, producing EF1 damage near the intersection of Township Line Road and Bunker Hill Road. Trees were snapped, a barn had its metal roof torn off, and two other barns sustained roof damage. Further east, EF1 damage continued as two homes lost a large amount of shingles. Reaching high-end EF2 strength, the tornado damaged multiple homes and outbuildings near the intersection of Hellwarth Road and Fairground Road, with the most severe damage being inflicted to a house that lost much of its roof and some exterior walls. Additional EF2 damage occurred as the tornado continued along Fairground Road and began to enter the northern part of Celina. A 300-foot cell tower was toppled to the ground, several homes sustained partial to total roof loss, outbuildings and power poles were damaged, and a large swath of trees was flattened as the tornado moved through a wooded area. As the storm entered a subdivision in northern Celina, it reached its peak intensity as numerous homes sustained EF3 damage. Many well-built homes in this area had their roofs ripped off and sustained collapse of numerous exterior walls. One man was killed in his home when an airborne vehicle smashed through the walls of his house. The most intense point of damage was noted at one anchor-bolted house in this area that was swept clean from its foundation and scattered through an adjacent field. Damage of this severity is typically rated at least EF4, though damage surveyors noted that the home's poorly built block foundation actually came apart underneath the bolts, rendering them ineffective. A maximum rating of EF3 was applied as a result. The tornado maintained EF3 intensity as it continued across Touvelle Road and Jill Avenue, where at least two-dozen homes had their roofs torn off, some of which sustained collapse of exterior walls. Debris patterns in this area indicated that the tornado had a multiple-vortex structure at this point. The tornado then moved out of Celina and began moving along a more northeasterly path, weakening to EF2 intensity as it crossed Celina-Mendon Road. Many trees were snapped, and a house had its roof and some exterior walls ripped off. High-end EF1 damage was observed within the vicinity of SR 197, where a garage was destroyed and a home sustained heavy roof and wall damage. Just beyond this point, the tornado lifted and dissipated in an open field to the south of the small town of Neptune.

The maximum estimated wind speed from the survey was 150 mph (240 km/h), and the tornado reached a peak width of 250 yards along its 11-mile path. In addition to the fatality, eight people were injured. The town of Celina had also previously sustained significant damage from EF2 tornadoes that struck in 2011 and 2017.

=== Brookville–Trotwood–Dayton–Riverside, Ohio ===
Brookville–Trotwood–Dayton–Riverside, Ohio
- The tornado at near peak intensity as seen from Northridge.

Meteorological history
- Formed: May 27, 2019, 10:41 p.m. EDT (UTC–04:00)
- Dissipated: May 27, 2019, 11:13 p.m. EDT (UTC–04:00)
- Duration: 32 minutes

EF4 tornado
- on the Enhanced Fujita scale
- Highest winds: 170 mph (270 km/h)

Overall effects
- Fatalities: 1 indirect
- Injuries: 166
- Damage: $500 million (2019 USD)

During the overnight of May 27, this large and destructive EF4 tornado struck parts of Dayton and surrounding suburbs, resulting in widespread major damage and numerous injuries. At 10:31 p.m. EDT, the National Weather Service Weather Forecast Office in Wilmington issued a tornado warning for a thunderstorm with radar-indicated rotation over northeastern Preble and Montgomery counties. Ten minutes later, a tornado touched down west of Brookville, Ohio, causing minor EF0 tree damage along North Sulpher Springs Road. Moving due-east, the tornado quickly intensified to high-end EF2 strength and entered Brookville, where significant damage occurred. Numerous homes in town had their roof torn off, some of which sustained collapse of a few exterior walls. A wastewater treatment plant was badly damaged, while Brookville High School had much of its roof torn off. Many trees and power lines were downed, and a small automotive business was leveled as well. A pronounced hook echo and debris ball became evident on radar as the tornado tracked across southern Brookville. Past Brookville, additional homes were severely damaged in less populated areas to the east of town. The intensifying tornado then moved into the neighboring suburb of Trotwood and began moving along a more southeasterly path, reaching EF3 intensity as it struck densely populated residential areas. Numerous homes in Trotwood were damaged or destroyed, including several well-built homes that sustained total loss of their roofs and exterior walls. Multiple apartment buildings were heavily damaged as well, and numerous trees were snapped. The tornado reached high-end EF3 strength as it impacted the eastern part of Trotwood and exited town, inflicting major structural damage as it struck the historic Hara Arena building. In total, 500 homes were damaged and 59 were destroyed in the city of Trotwood, resulting in four hospitalizations. Another 30 persons without access to breathable air or medications as a result of the tornado were transported elsewhere.

Continuing along a southeasterly path, the powerful tornado entered the Dayton city limits and tore through the Shiloh neighborhood at high-end EF3 strength. By this point, the National Weather Service had issued a Particularly Dangerous Situation tornado warning at 10:50 p.m. EDT followed by a tornado emergency six minutes later for Montgomery County. Widespread, major damage occurred within the vicinity of Shiloh Springs Road, Turner Road, Shoup Mill Road, and North Main Street. Multiple commercial buildings were damaged or destroyed throughout this corridor, including multiple restaurants, self-storage units, a tobacco shop, and several other small businesses. 154 cars were totaled and another 50 were damaged at the Evans Arena car dealership, and dozens of homes were damaged or destroyed as well. Just beyond this point, the tornado strengthened further as it passed just south of Frederick Pike and moved along Riverside Drive. The River's Edge Apartments were devastated by the tornado, and multiple large brick apartment buildings sustained destruction of their upper floors in this area. No buildings were leveled in typical EF4 fashion at this location, though damage surveyors determined that such severe damage to such well-built structures was indicative of low-end EF4 winds. Along the northern edge of the damage path, the Foxton Apartments were also significantly damaged. In addition, the most intense winds appeared to have occurred in a wooded area along the Stillwater River, between the two apartment complexes. A massive swath of large hardwood trees was completely mowed down and debarked. Trees that remained standing in this area were completely stripped of limbs and bark, with only stubs of the largest branches remaining. Surveyors determined that such extreme tree damage was also indicative of EF4 intensity.

The tornado weakened slightly back to high-end EF3 strength as it passed north of downtown Dayton and moved through the Northridge area of Harrison Township. Widespread destruction occurred along North Dixie Drive and Wagner Ford Road as gas stations, hotels, churches, industrial buildings, and numerous homes and business were damaged or destroyed. The North Plaza shopping center was destroyed by the tornado, with large portions of the building completely collapsed. The Living Room, a nearby strip club, was completely destroyed as well. A small used car dealership was leveled, Grafton Kennedy Elementary School sustained loss of its roof and several exterior walls, and many trees were snapped and denuded in this area. Continuing to the southeast at EF3 strength, the tornado entered the Old North Dayton neighborhood of Dayton and caused severe damage to homes and businesses. Several large industrial buildings and factories, such as the Dayton Phoenix Group and a Frito-Lay distribution warehouse were largely destroyed. Numerous industrial vehicles, delivery trucks, and semi-trailers were thrown and tossed atop one another as well, and multiple very large metal storage tanks were crumpled and damaged. The tornado began to weaken as it moved through neighborhoods along Brandt Pike and Valley Street, passing northeast of Dayton Children's Hospital. A mixture of EF1 to EF2 damage occurred as many homes sustained minor to moderate damage, and some garages were destroyed. The historic Amber Rose restaurant sustained roof and window damage in this area as well. Crossing SR 4, the tornado then inflicted EF2 damage to the Action Sports Complex, badly damaging a large metal building at that location. The tornado then crossed the Mad River and struck the East Dayton neighborhood of Springfield. EF2 damage occurred along Springfield Street, where several industrial buildings and warehouses sustained major structural damage, metal truss transmission towers were blown over, debris was scattered throughout the area, and semi-trailers and vehicles were moved and damaged as well. Southeast of this point and further along the path, EF1 damage occurred in residential areas of East Dayton, with damage limited to roofs, trees, and power lines. The tornado continued at EF1 strength as it exited the Dayton city limits and entered the suburb of Riverside, Ohio. A swath of tree and roof damage occurred in town, and duplexes at the Overlook Mutual Homes complex had portions of their roofs torn off. The final point of damage occurred at the Colonial Village Apartments in Riverside, where roofing and brick facade was blown off of multiple apartment buildings. The tornado finally lifted and dissipated along Burkhardt Road, just west of the border between Montgomery and Greene counties after traveling 20 miles (32 km). The tornado was rated as a low-end EF4, with winds of 170 mph (270 km/h), and had a peak width of just over one-half mile.

Despite striking at night and producing major damage in a densely populated urban area, remarkably, this tornado did not result in any direct fatalities. This was likely because most Dayton area residents heeded the warning issued as the tornado approached the city, and took shelter well before the tornado struck. In addition, only a small segment of EF4 damage was observed along the path, and was largely confined to a wooded area that was impacted. 166 people were injured by the tornado, however. In September 2019, the Montgomery County coroner ruled that an elderly Trotwood woman's death was caused in part by trauma from the tornado. She had been in poor health, and was trapped in her destroyed home following the tornado. However, her death was not officially listed as a direct tornado fatality in the National Climatic Data Center database. The tornado was the strongest to strike Ohio in nine years, and the first violent tornado to strike Ohio since an EF4 tornado hit Millbury, Ohio on the night of June 5, 2010. It was also the first violent tornado to occur in the month of May in three years.

=== Riverside–Beavercreek, Ohio ===
Riverside–Beavercreek, Ohio
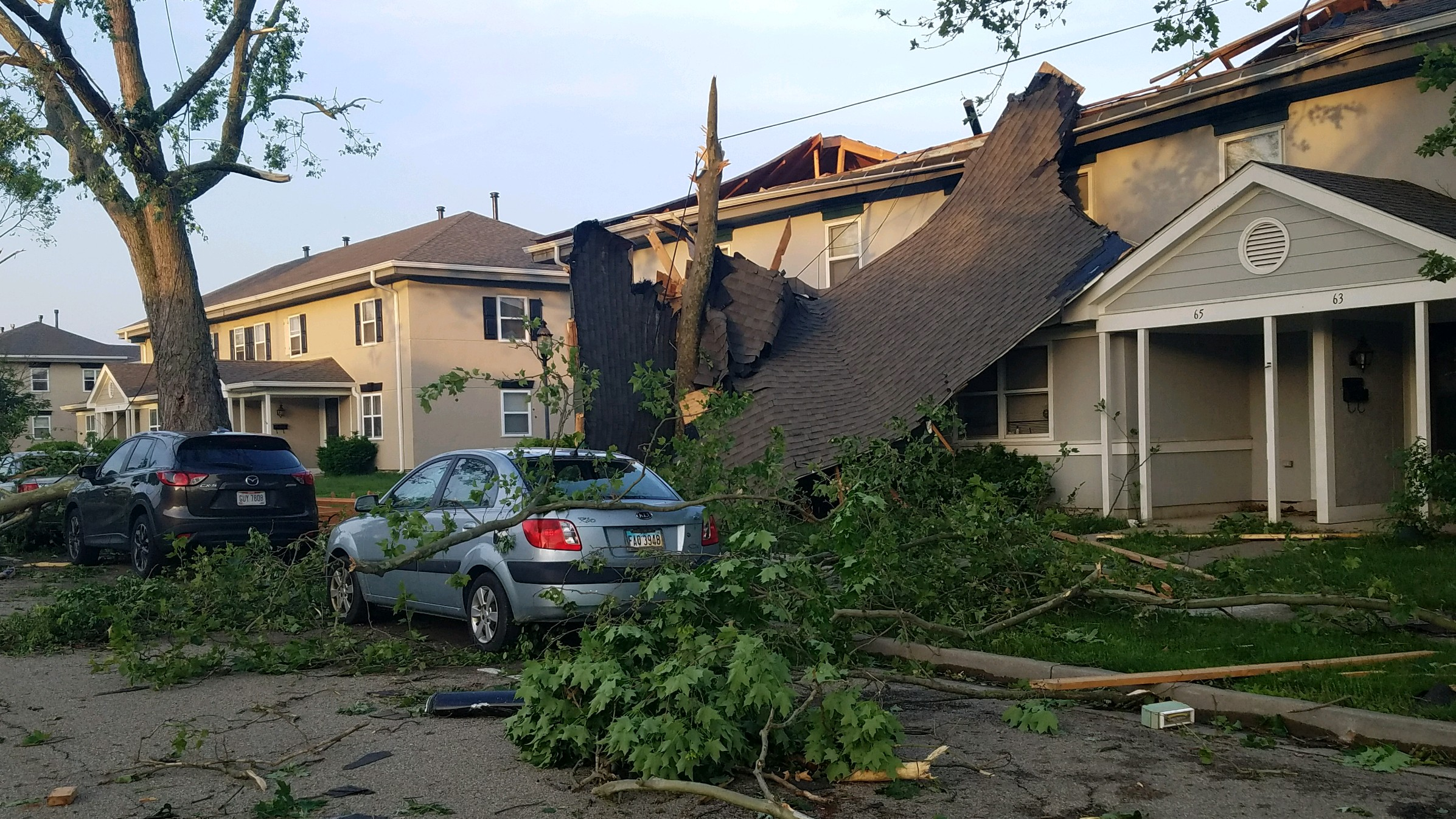
- Tree and roof damage at the Prairies at Wright Field in Riverside, Ohio, where the tornado initially touched down.

Meteorological history
- Formed: May 27, 2019, 11:12 p.m. EDT (UTC–04:00)
- Dissipated: May 27, 2019, 11:32 p.m. EDT (UTC–04:00)
- Duration: 20 minutes

EF3 tornado
- on the Enhanced Fujita scale
- Highest winds: 140 mph (230 km/h)

Overall effects
- Fatalities: 0
- Injuries: 0
- Damage: $50.5 million (2019 USD)

Shortly after the previous EF4 tornado dissipated in Riverside, Ohio, the same parent supercell quickly produced another strong tornado that touched down in the same suburb. The tornado touched down just south of the National Museum of the United States Air Force and immediately reached EF2 strength as it impacted the Prairies at Wright Field, and the Properties at Wright Field, which are two military housing developments for the nearby Wright-Patterson Air Force Base. Multiple housing units had their roofs torn off, and numerous large trees were snapped or uprooted at this location. Continuing to the east-southeast, the tornado crossed into Greene County, widening and strengthening into a large multiple-vortex tornado as it approached and crossed I-675, downing power poles and snapping or denuding numerous large trees on both sides of the highway. Just east of I-675, the tornado entered a residential area of Beavercreek, Ohio, a densely populated eastern suburb of Dayton. By this point the tornado had reached low-end EF3 strength, and numerous homes were damaged or destroyed in this area. Some of the most severe damage occurred along Rushton Drive, where multiple homes were left with only a few interior walls standing. Just east-southeast of this point, the tornado briefly weakened slightly as it struck a neighborhood along the west side of Grange Hall Road, where dozens of homes were heavily damaged or destroyed at high-end EF2 intensity. The tornado then intensified back to low-end EF3 strength as it crossed Grange Hall Road, and began moving along a more due-easterly path as it tore through the Fairfield Lakes apartment complex. The most severe damage at this location was noted along Anna Laura Lane, where multiple well-built apartment buildings sustained roof loss and collapse of their top floor exterior walls. Continuing to the east, the tornado weakened again as it entered the Spicer Heights neighborhood of Beavercreek at EF2 strength, where numerous homes had their roofs torn off, and a few sustained some exterior wall failure. Many trees were snapped and uprooted in this neighborhood, and parked vehicles were battered and damaged by flying debris. The tornado weakened further as it passed over Shaw Elementary School and moved through nearby neighborhoods at EF1 intensity. The school itself sustained minor roof damage, while numerous trees were downed, and many homes sustained roof damage. Additional EF1 roof, siding, and tree damage occurred as the tornado continued east and struck the Mallard Landing Apartments.

The tornado then intensified back to EF2 strength as it approached and crossed North Fairfield Road. Many restaurants and businesses including National Tire and Battery, Mike's Carwash, Hobby Lobby, Petland, Primanti Brothers, Abuelos's, IHOP, Chick-fil-A, Aldi, two strip malls, and several office buildings sustained significant damage. A few of these structures sustained roof and exterior wall loss, and flying debris was impaled through the walls of other buildings. Further east, the tornado weakened again as numerous homes and apartment buildings sustained EF1 damage in the Stone Falls subdivision and neighborhoods further east. Along Kemp Road, a fire station was heavily damaged, and a historic barn was destroyed at nearby Wartinger Park. Two church buildings sustained relatively minor in this area as well, and many trees were snapped or uprooted. Continuing to the east, the tornado exited densely populated areas of Beavercreek and began moving through more rural areas. EF0 to EF1 damage was noted along Beaver Valley Road, Trebein Road, Ludlow Road, and Fairground Road. Damage along this corridor consisted of roof damage to homes, trees snapped and uprooted, barns and outbuildings damaged or destroyed, and a few metal truss transmission towers blown over. The tornado then caused additional minor roof, tree, and barn damage within the vicinity of Clifton Road and US 68 before dissipating to the north of Xenia, Ohio.

This tornado was rated low-end EF3, with winds estimated at 140 mph (230 km/h). It was on the ground for 10 miles (16 km), and had a peak width just short of three-quarters of a mile wide. Several injuries were reported along the path, but no casualties were listed in the final report.

=== Lawrence–Eudora–Linwood–Bonner Springs, Kansas ===
Lawrence–Eudora–Linwood–Bonner Springs, Kansas
- A video-still of the wedge tornado near Linwood, Kansas.

Meteorological history
- Formed: May 28, 2019, 6:05 p.m. CDT (UTC–05:00)
- Dissipated: May 28, 2019, 7:00 p.m. CDT (UTC–05:00)
- Duration: 55 minutes

EF4 tornado
- on the Enhanced Fujita scale
- Highest winds: 170 mph (270 km/h)*; *A 190 mph (310 km/h) gust was measured by a rocket probe

Overall effects
- Fatalities: 0
- Injuries: 4
- Damage: $48 million (2019 USD)

On the evening of May 28, this massive, violent, multiple-vortex and rain-wrapped wedge tornado touched down at the north side of Lone Star Lake in Douglas County, Kansas. As the tornado formed, it absorbed the circulation of a smaller EF2 tornado that was moving along the east side of the lake. EF1 damage to trees and the roof of a house was observed at the beginning of the path. The tornado began to widen and strengthen as it continued just northeast of Lone Star Lake, snapping and uprooting numerous large trees at EF2 intensity. EF3 damage was observed as the tornado crossed East 850th Road, where many trees were denuded and partially debarked. Farther to the northeast, EF3 damage continued at the intersection of North 900th Road and East 1000 Road, where additional trees were debarked and a house was leveled at high-end EF3 strength. Several cars were tossed into a field, outbuildings were destroyed, and power poles were snapped nearby. Another house in this area sustained EF2 roof and wall damage. The tornado then weakened to high-end EF1 intensity as it crossed East 1100th Road, tearing a large section of roof from a house, and causing lesser roof damage to another nearby home. Quickly re-intensifying, the tornado crossed North 1000 Road at EF3 strength, where two well-built homes sustained loss of their roofs and multiple exterior walls. Several other homes in this area had their roofs torn off, one of which sustained high-end EF2 damage, with its roof and a few second-floor exterior walls ripped off. EF3 damage continued as the tornado crossed US 59 and North 1100th Road, where multiple homes had roofs torn off and exterior walls collapsed. Trees were snapped, outbuildings were destroyed, and a large truck was rolled over as well. The large wedge tornado weakened to EF2 strength as it then grazed the southeastern fringes of Lawrence, snapping numerous trees and power poles. Outbuildings were destroyed, and a few homes along the outer edge of the damage path sustained minor damage. One house along East 1750 Road sustained high-end EF1 damage to its roof and walls. Past Lawrence, the tornado regained EF3 intensity as it moved through rural areas to the northeast of Eudora. Multiple well-built homes sustained roof and exterior wall loss, and a large masonry school building that housed a daycare center sustained major structural damage. Storm spotters reported multiple vortices with this tornado in these areas; many trees were denuded and debarked, and large amounts of debris were strewn through open farm fields.

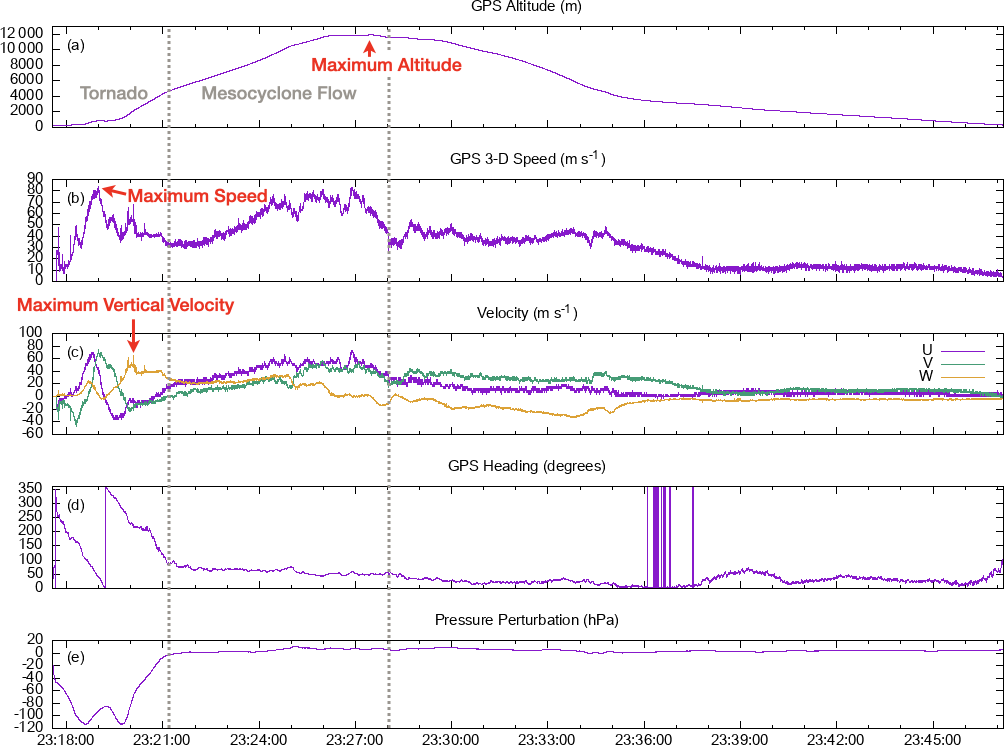
Data from the rocket probe.

As the rain-wrapped tornado crossed the Kansas River and moved into Leavenworth County, it snapped numerous trees at EF2 intensity. The tornado then reached its peak intensity as it struck the western outskirts of Linwood, where an anchor-bolted frame home was completely leveled and partially swept away. All that remained at this site was the home's basement and a pile of debris, and this point of damage was rated EF4. Scientific probes shot into the tornado by a research team recorded a windspeed measurement of 187 mph (301 km/h) in this area. Several other homes at the western edge of Linwood sustained EF2 to EF3 damage, sustaining loss of their roofs and exterior walls. Numerous trees were snapped and denuded as well. The tornado then passed just north of Linwood and crossed 198th street, completely destroying numerous large metal agricultural buildings, as well as flipping and tossing multiple vehicles. As the tornado emerged from the rain, storm spotters again reported multiple vortices. A house was destroyed in this area as well, and damage along this portion of the path was rated high-end EF2. A mixture of EF1 and EF2 damage was observed as the tornado continued to the northeast through rural areas, impacting several homes, with damage ranging from sections of roofing torn off to severe structural damage. Just west of Bonner Springs, the tornado crossed Linwood Road, causing EF1 damage to outbuildings. Some minor EF0 tree limb damage was noted at 150th Street before the tornado dissipated.

With one house sustaining EF4 damage, the tornado was rated as such and was up to 1 mi (1.6 km) wide at times. It was on the ground for 55 minutes and traveled a distance of 29.07 mi (46.78 km). No fatalities occurred, though 18 people were injured. The tornado dissipated shortly before it would have entered populated areas of the Kansas City metropolitan area. The Kansas City International Airport, over 40 mi (64 km) away from the area affected by the tornado, reported debris on the runway. The large amount of debris led to dozens of flight cancellations. The tornado was the first violent tornado to strike the state of Kansas since a mid-range EF4 tornado came within close range of the towns of Abilene and Chapman on May 25, 2016.

On February 8, 2024, meteorologist and storm chaser Reed Timmer, along with Mark Simpson, Sean Schofer, and Curtis Brooks, published a paper about the design of and information about a new meteorological rocket probe that can be launched into tornadoes. The researchers launched one of these rocket probes into the EF4 tornado. The probe recorded winds of 85.1 m/s (190 mph; 306 km/h) during its first rotation around the tornado and also recorded a pressure drop of 113.5 hPa (113.5 mb) inside the tornado. The probe also recorded that the tornado's updraft was 65.0 m/s (145 mph; 234 km/h). The tornado threw the probe 32 mi (51 km), where the researchers were able to recover it.

== Non-tornadic effects ==
=== Flooding ===
This storm system prolonged an ongoing heavy precipitation event across much of the southern Plains, Midwest, and eastern Canada, which included an unusually late, record-setting heavy snow event in the Midwest. In eastern Canada, the previous flooding was already being described as 100-year events. Most of this region had received between 5–10 inches (130–250 mm) of rain during April. Several localities had broken April precipitation records before the additional rainfall from the May 2019 outbreak. The Quad Cities of Iowa and Illinois had just ended a record-breaking 51-day record for most days above major flood stage on May 12 before the new set of storms hit; many of the upstream cities along the Mississippi and Ohio were in a similar position. Much of the northeastern U.S. as well as eastern Canada had been dealing with continual rain since snowmelt, which had been causing previous extensive flooding. The addition of the wide-reaching heavy rainfall from the May series of storms to the already-saturated ground intensified river flooding and flash flooding effects.

==== Flash flooding ====
The torrential rain resulted in frequent flash-flooding. One-third of all flash-flooding reports during April and May came from Kansas, Oklahoma, and Missouri. A four-year-old-boy was swept away in a flooded creek in Indiana. One person drowned in his van near Fort Chaffee, Arkansas.

==== River and lakeshore flooding ====
The Arkansas River and much of its associated watershed broke record flooding levels on May 26 and continued to rise during the following week. Water management systems protected Little Rock from record-level flooding.

Flooding in Canada broke records after the new round of storms. Several cities in Ontario, Quebec, and the Maritimes declared states of emergency, including Montreal, Quebec, Huntsville, Ontario, Fredericton, New Brunswick, and the twin cities of Ottawa, Ontario and Gatineau, Quebec. The new flooding blocked the Trans-Canada Highway near Fredericton.

Lake Ontario broke record flood levels on May 31 due to heavy rainfall and the record inflow of water it received from Lake Erie, and was still rising. On May 27, lakeshore flood warnings were issued along the New York shoreline between Monroe County and the Canadian border.

==== May rainfall records ====
Many locations in both the United States and Canada set new May rainfall records.

In the contiguous United States, the 12-month period ending in May set a precipitation record for any 12-month period ever at 37.68 inches (95.7 cm), 7.73 inches (19.6 cm) above average. The NOAA also reported the second wettest May ever recorded in the contiguous U.S. at 4.41 inches (11.2 cm): 1.5 inches (3.8 cm) above average, and 0.03 inches (0.076 cm) shy of the all-time record. Kansas, Nebraska, and Missouri all broke their state records for most precipitation in May. Seven other states had precipitation totals in their top 5. Multiple localities in southern and central California broke rainfall records at the beginning of the sequence, including locations which had never previously reported more than a trace of rain in May.

Ottawa, Ontario nearly doubled its average rainfall to set a new May record of 175.8 millimetres (6.92 in) of rain. Montreal, Quebec, which has kept records since 1871, tied its record for total May rainfall; and also set a new record for the longest stretch of days with rain, at 16.

Chicago, Illinois set a new May rainfall record of 8.25 inches (21.0 cm), more than double its average precipitation, as part of its second-wettest spring on record. It also tied its record for the longest stretch of days with rain, at 21. The extreme rainfall has significantly set back crop planting in the region for the 2019 season.

In the Great Plains, Kansas City, Kansas reported a new May record rainfall of 12.81 inches (32.5 cm), which is also its third-wettest month in 131 years. Bartlesville, Oklahoma broke its previous May record of 10.31 inches by more than four inches of rain. Wichita, Kansas and Enid, Oklahoma, recorded their second-highest May rainfall with nearly 13 inches of rain.

The severe storms that produced the tornadoes were accompanied by extremely heavy rainfall. The town of Zelienople, Pennsylvania, received more than four inches of rain in 24 hours during May 28 and 29. On May 21, two people were killed in a traffic accident in Missouri when their vehicle lost traction in heavy rain.

=== Other non-tornadic effects ===
On May 28 and 29, softball-sized hail caused considerable damage in Armstrong and Venango counties, Pennsylvania. Severe thunderstorms also produced numerous reports of straight-line wind damage in both the United States and Canada.

Several high-use areas not directly struck by tornadoes were covered by extensive blown or falling debris. In Dayton, the Ohio Department of Transportation used snowplows to clear debris from Interstate 75. Although the May 28 tornado warning for Kansas City International Airport expired without a tornado after an hour, the airport had to stay closed to remove debris from its runways. The debris was deposited on the runways as a result of a violent EF4 tornado that had destroyed multiple homes in the Linwood, Kansas area, 47 miles away. The airport was not in operation again until after midnight, and flights were still being canceled as late as 7:30 am on May 29.

== Aftermath ==
Pre-existing states of emergency were extended in Iowa and Nebraska. States of emergency were also declared by the governor in Arkansas, Ohio, Mississippi, and Missouri because of the flooding and tornadoes. The mayor declared a state of emergency in Zelienople, Pennsylvania, after it received more than four inches of rain in 24 hours. When the rain moved over New York, a baseball game at Yankee Stadium was postponed.

=== Transportation interruptions ===
Road, rail and air transportation was seriously affected by the flooding and tornadoes. Jefferson City Memorial Airport was closed due to flooding and Kansas City International Airport was closed for half a day while debris was removed from its runways. More than 500 roads were closed across Missouri, including I-29 near the Iowa border. I-75 near Dayton, Ohio, was closed for a day while snowplows removed tornado debris. Amtrak experienced major disruptions across the Midwest and Eastern United States with its Missouri River Runner service between Kansas City and St. Louis being suspended due to flooding from the Missouri River. The Southwest Chief service between Kansas City and Hutchinson, Kansas, was also halted. Both routes were served by buses until the flooding abated. An Amtrak train was stopped between New York City and Pittsburgh on May 29 due to fallen trees as well. West of Columbus Junction, Iowa, a section of Iowa 92 was washed out near its intersection with County Highway X17; that section of Iowa 92 was closed for several months afterward while construction crews rebuilt the washed-out road, resulting in traffic being detoured to other state highways.

=== Electricity outages ===
In the Dayton, Ohio region, 80,000 people were without power on May 28 and 29. People using generators in confined spaces led to an increase in hospital admissions due to carbon monoxide poisoning. In eastern Canada, electricity outages were minor, mostly caused by windstorms associated with the greater storm systems. Although they affected thousands of people at different times throughout the day, all power was restored by the end of the day.

=== Boil water advisories and water outages ===
Dayton, Trotwood, Montgomery County and parts of Greene County, Ohio were placed under a boil water advisory on May 28. Many of the same individuals affected by the boil advisory also lost most or all water pressure for a time due to a loss of power at two water-treatment plants and several pumping stations as one violent EF4 tornado, along with two other strong tornadoes (EF3 and EF2) moved through the city and nearby suburbs. This was the second major loss of water and boil advisory in the area within the year, following a similar event in February.

== See also ==
- Weather of 2019
- List of North American tornadoes and tornado outbreaks
- List of F4, EF4, and IF4 tornadoes
  - List of F4 and EF4 tornadoes (2010–2019)
