= 2019 Dayton tornado =

2019 EF4 tornado in Ohio, United States

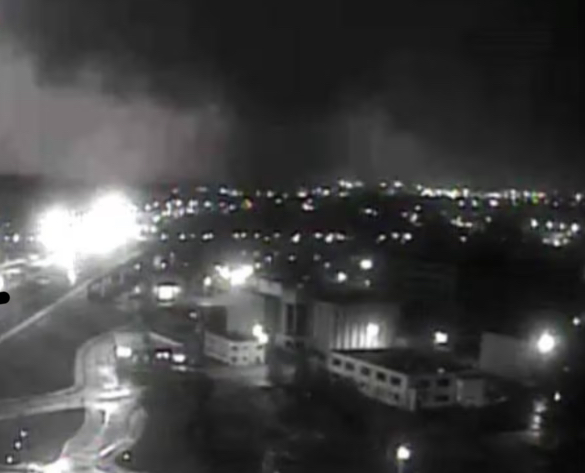
- The tornado near peak intensity in northern Dayton

Meteorological history
- Formed: May 27, 2019, 10:41 p.m. EDT (UTC−04:00)
- Dissipated: May 27, 2019, 11:13 p.m. EDT (UTC−04:00)
- Duration: 32 minutes

EF4 tornado
- on the Enhanced Fujita scale
- Highest winds: 170 mph (270 km/h)

Overall effects
- Fatalities: 1 indirect
- Injuries: 166
- Damage: $500 million (2019 USD) $633 million (2025 USD)
- Areas affected: Dayton and the wider Montgomery County, Ohio area
- Part of the Tornado outbreak of May 25–30, 2019 and Tornadoes of 2019

On the night of May 27, 2019 (Memorial Day), a large and destructive tornado struck Dayton, Ohio as well as the surrounding suburbs of Brookville, Trotwood, Northridge and Riverside, injuring 166 people and indirectly killing one person. Part of a larger severe weather outbreak, the tornado was the first of two EF4-rated tornadoes to touch down during the outbreak, with the other occurring in Kansas a day later. It was the first EF4 tornado in Ohio since the tornado that struck Millbury in 2010. Along the tornado's 18.17-mile (29.24 km) path through Montgomery County, the tornado was on the ground for 32 minutes, reaching a peak width of 1,050 yards (960 m) at times, and causing an estimated total of $500 million (2019 USD) in damage.

== Meteorological synopsis ==
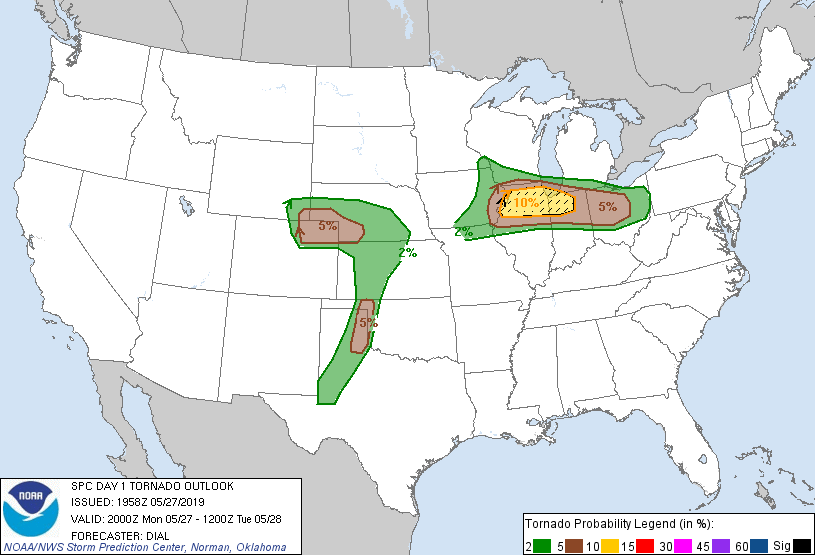
SPC tornado outlook for the afternoon of May 27 (20:00 UTC)

On the morning of May 27, the Storm Prediction Center issued an enhanced risk of severe weather for eastern Iowa, Illinois, Indiana, southwestern Michigan, and western Ohio for significant tornadoes, large hail, and damaging wind gusts. Much of Ohio was initially excluded from the tornado risk, but was eventually included as the severe weather outlook was updated in the afternoon. As a shortwave trough moved northeast across the area, low-to-mid-level westerlies were expected to interact with a low-pressure area associated with the trough, increasing the amount of moisture and atmospheric instability as clouds from a decaying mesoscale convective system dissipated, resulting in increased mid-level convective available potential energy (CAPE) values of 2,500 to 3,000 j/kg across the region, indicating strong instability. Additionally, 40-50 kts of wind shear was present within the region, with the strongest winds being present 1–2 km (0.62–1.24 mi) above the ground. These conditions being mixed with a warm front associated with the low-pressure area led to an environment conducive for tornadogenesis from eastern Iowa to western Ohio, which was included in the afternoon's outlook update after they had found the potential for a supercell or two to develop and be capable of producing tornadoes with the lower-level jet stream winds expected to increase that night, allowing for low-level mesocyclone development.

At 8:20 p.m. EDT, the SPC issued a tornado watch for western and central Ohio, with a 60% chance of a tornado occurring within the watch area, along with a 30% chance of a strong (EF2+) tornado. Multiple supercells had developed and moved across Illinois and Indiana, which produced several tornadoes as they moved east, and were expected to continue doing so as they entered the state and approached the lower-level jet stream winds in conditions favorable for further tornado activity.

== Tornado summary ==
=== Formation and track through Brookville ===
The National Weather Service in Wilmington, Ohio first issued a tornado warning for the supercell that produced the Dayton tornado at 10:31 p.m. EDT in Preble and Montgomery counties. Ten minutes after the warning was issued, the tornado touched down west of Brookville in Montgomery County, initially causing minor EF0 damage to trees along northern Sulphur Springs road. The tornado quickly intensified to high-end EF2 strength as it entered the city, where numerous homes had their roofs torn off or sustained severe roof damage, and some had a few exterior walls collapse as the tornado moved through. Significant damage occurred to a wastewater treatment plant and to Brookville High School, which had large portions of its roof removed. Additionally, the tornado damaged numerous trees and power lines, and completely destroyed a small automotive business.

=== Impact in Trotwood ===
After impacting Brookville, a Particularly Dangerous Situation (PDS) tornado warning was issued at 10:50 pm EDT, and the tornado moved into northern Trotwood and took a turn to the southeast. Here, the tornado reached EF3 intensity as it caused the roofs and multiple exterior walls of several houses to collapse along Westbrook Road. Other houses and apartment complexes around this area sustained EF2 damage, and many trees were also snapped. As the tornado moved into eastern parts of the city, it strengthened further to high-end EF3 intensity as it impacted the Hara Arena, where large parts of its roof and multiple walls were removed. This resulted in $7.5 million in damage, the highest for any property in Montgomery County, and prompted the building's demolition the following year. Within the city, over 1,100 buildings were damaged or destroyed, with 500 homes sustaining damage, and 59 being destroyed. Four people were hospitalized, and another 30 people that had lost access to breathable air and medications were transported to another location.

=== Damage within Dayton ===
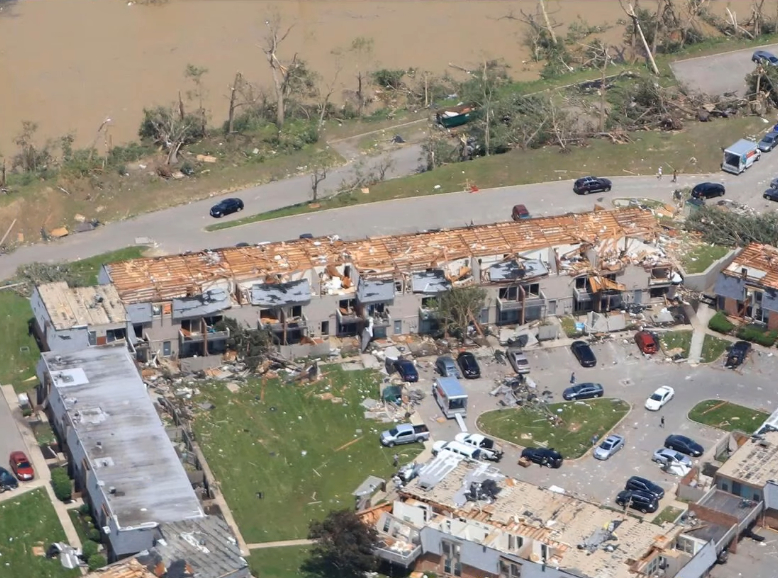
Low-end EF4 damage to several apartment buildings in Dayton

The tornado continued to move southeast into the city limits of Dayton as it maintained high-end EF3 intensity, moving into the Shiloh neighborhood. At this point, the National Weather Service issued a tornado emergency for Montgomery County at 10:57 p.m. EDT. Along the roads of Shiloh Springs, Turner, Shoup Mill, and North Main Street, major damage occurred to multiple restaurants, self-storage units, a tobacco shop, and several other small businesses, along with numerous homes and apartment complexes. At the Evans Arena car dealership, 154 cars were totaled, and another 50 were damaged. The tornado then strengthened to EF4 intensity as it moved just south of Frederick Pike and along Riverside Drive, impacting the River's Edge Apartments. Several large brick apartment buildings sustained the destruction of their upper floors, and while there weren't any buildings leveled like a typical EF4 rating would suggest, damage surveyors determined that such significant damage to such well-constructed buildings was indicative of EF4 winds. The tornado had also severely damaged the Foxton Apartments, and a large swath of hardwood trees were downed and debarked in a corridor along the Stillwater River, where the most intense winds were believed to have taken place. Trees had been completely stripped of leaves and bark, with only stubs of the largest branches remaining, and surveyors determined that this level of damage to trees was also indicative of EF4 strength.

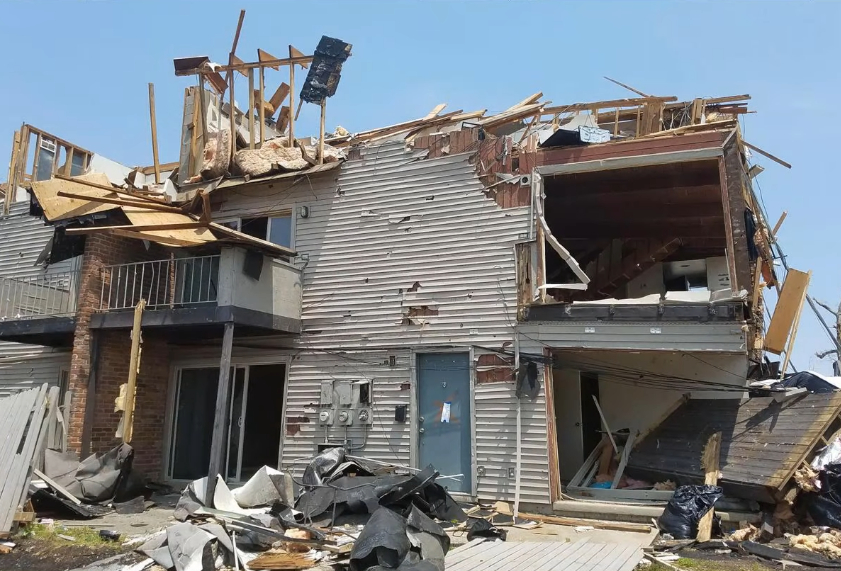
EF4-rated damage to a building in Dayton

As the tornado continued north of downtown Dayton and moved into the Northridge area of Harrison Township, the tornado slightly weakened to high-end EF3 strength, but continued to cause widespread damage along North Dixie Drive and Wagner Ford Road. Numerous gas stations, churches, industrial buildings, hotels, and homes were damaged or destroyed. The tornado destroyed the North Plaza shopping center, with large sections of the building completely collapsed. It had also completely destroyed The Living Room, a nearby strip club. A small used car dealership was also leveled, Grafton Kennedy Elementary School lost its roof and multiple exterior walls, and many trees were snapped and denuded as well. The tornado moved into the Old North Dayton neighborhood of Dayton at EF3 intensity as it continued to the southeast, where it significantly damaged more homes and businesses. Multiple factories and large industrial buildings, such as the Dayton Phoenix Group and a Frito-Lay distribution warehouse were largely destroyed. Many industrial vehicles, semi-trailers, and delivery trucks were thrown and tossed atop one another, and multiple large metal storage tanks were crumpled and damaged as well. Moving through neighborhoods along Brandt Pike and Valley Street, the tornado started to weaken as it passed northeast of Dayton Children's Hospital. EF1 to EF2 damage occurred here as many homes received minor to moderate damage, with some garages being destroyed. The roof and windows of the historic Amber Rose restaurant were also damaged. The Action Sports Complex sustained EF2 damage after the tornado had crossed SR 4, with a large metal building being severely damaged. The tornado crossed the Mad River into the Wright View neighborhood, and major damage occurred to multiple warehouses and industrial buildings that received EF2 damage. Metal truss transmission towers were blown down, debris was scattered across the area, and multiple semi-trailers and vehicles were also moved and damaged. To the southeast, EF1 damage continued to occur in residential areas of Wright View, where damage to roofs, trees, and power lines took place.

=== Track through Riverside and later dissipation ===
Continuing to the southeast, the tornado exited the Dayton city limits and moved into Riverside at EF1 intensity. Tree and roof damage took place across southern portions of the town, and duplexes at the Overlook Mutual Homes complex had parts of their roofs torn off. At the Colonial Village Apartments in Riverside, roofing and brick facade was blown off of multiple apartment buildings before the tornado lifted and dissipated along Burkhardt Road, just west of the border between Montgomery and Greene counties.

== Aftermath ==
The tornado was rated as a low-end EF4, with winds of 170 miles per hour (270 km/h), a path length of 18.17 miles (29.24 km), and a peak width of 1,050 yards (960 m). It remained on the ground for 32 minutes, and caused $500 million in damage.

=== Casualties ===
No direct fatalities took place during the tornado, despite causing major damage in a densely populated urban area at night. This was likely due to warnings being issued ahead of the tornado's impact, with the first tornado warning being issued nine minutes before the tornado touched down and over 20 minutes before it moved into the city, giving people time to take shelter before the tornado impacted the area. Additionally, there was only a small segment of EF4 damage observed within the path, mostly limited to a wooded area that was struck.

In September 2019, the Montgomery County coroner ruled that the death of an elderly woman in Trotwood was partially caused by injuries sustained from the tornado's impact, having been in poor health and trapped in her destroyed home following the tornado. Her death was considered an indirect fatality by the National Climatic Data Center. The same supercell also produced a large EF3 tornado that impacted Riverside and Beavercreek, which severely damaged or destroyed numerous homes and apartment complexes. Additionally, another EF2 tornado in Vandalia and Butler Township within Montgomery County also caused severe damage to numerous homes, apartment buildings, and businesses in the area. Neither of these tornadoes caused additional fatalities or injuries.

=== Damage ===
The tornado caused damage to nearly 3,000 homes and over 200 businesses along its path, which required thousands of residents to find temporary housing units while rebuilding efforts took place. Many homes and apartments that were rebuilt following the tornado had risen in cost, which limited people's ability to purchase new homes in the area after losing their previous homes. Several buildings that were impacted, such as the Hara Arena and the Foxton Court Apartments, also had to be demolished as a result of damages caused by the tornado.

== See also ==
- List of F4 and EF4 tornadoes (2010–2019)
- List of tornadoes in the outbreak of May 25–30, 2019
- List of tornado emergencies
- List of Ohio tornadoes
