= Ben Baker (politician) =

American politician

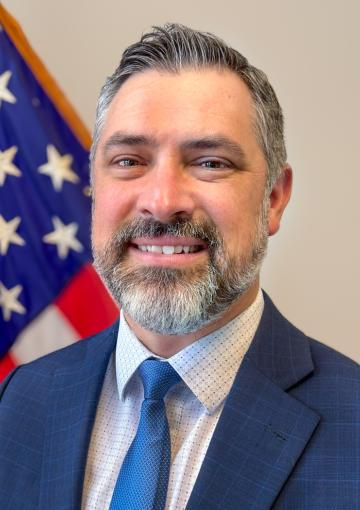
- Baker in 2025

Missouri Director for USDA Rural Development
- Incumbent
- Assumed office May 2025
- Appointed by: Donald Trump

Member of the Missouri House of Representatives from the 160th district
- In office January 9, 2019 – May 4, 2025
- Preceded by: Bill Reiboldt
- Succeeded by: Cheryle Perkins

Personal details
- Born: Indianapolis, Indiana
- Party: Republican
- Spouse: Naomi
- Children: 4
- Education: Ozark Bible Institute
- Website: Official website

Ben Baker is an American politician serving as the Director for USDA Rural Development in Missouri. A Republican, he previously served as a member of the Missouri House of Representatives, representing the 160th district from 2019 to 2025.

== Biography ==
Baker is a graduate and former dean of students at Ozark Bible Institute, and a former mayor and councilmember in Neosho, Missouri. He was first elected to the Missouri House in 2018, where he sits on committees for administrative rules, elementary and secondary education, downsizing state government and economic development.

On May 23, 2024, Baker's daughter Natalie and son-in-law Davy were killed in a gang attack in Haiti, where they had been working as missionaries.

Baker resigned from the Missouri House in May 2025 after being appointed as Missouri director for USDA Rural Development.

== Legislation ==
In 2020, Baker proposed House Bill 2044 to "require libraries to create review boards to regulate library events and anything else in the library considered age-inappropriate sexual material". He said that he was motivated by Drag Queen Story Hour, however it was not addressed by the bill. The Missouri Library Association opposed the legislation as each library system already has established protocols for appropriate services to minors.

In 2021, Baker sponsored a bill to curb business liabilities for COVID-19 infections. It was countered by dueling legislation and failed to pass Missouri Senate.

Baker sponsored a 2022 bill called a "Parents' Bill of Rights" that would place restrictions on school curriculum and open opportunities for parents to serve civil lawsuits on schools. Critics identified duplication in the bill with existing state laws, as well as "solutions seeking a problem," to which Baker described the bill as a preventative measure.

In 2023, Baker introduced a bill to block municipal bans on pet shop animals. Baker acknowledged that sales of live pets are a "heavily regulated industry" and described his bill as a preventative measure. He further acknowledged that he had not researched existing Missouri law on the matter. Petland, one of the businesses involved in the bill who also lobbies in Missouri legislature, has been linked to bacterial infection outbreaks and other concerns.

Baker attempted to expand a 2023 bill restricting healthcare to transgender youth to also block transgender health care for incarcerated adults. Baker also introduced legislation to block approval and ranked-choice voting. The opposition for his bill to override restrictions on concealed carry in places of worship included CVPA students who had recently survived a school shooting.
