= Brandom =

Brandom is a surname. Notable people with the surname include:

- Chick Brandom (1887–1958), American baseball player
- Ellen Brandom (1942–2026), American politician
- Robert Brandom (born 1950), American philosopher
