= Lone Star, Kansas =

- Unincorporated community
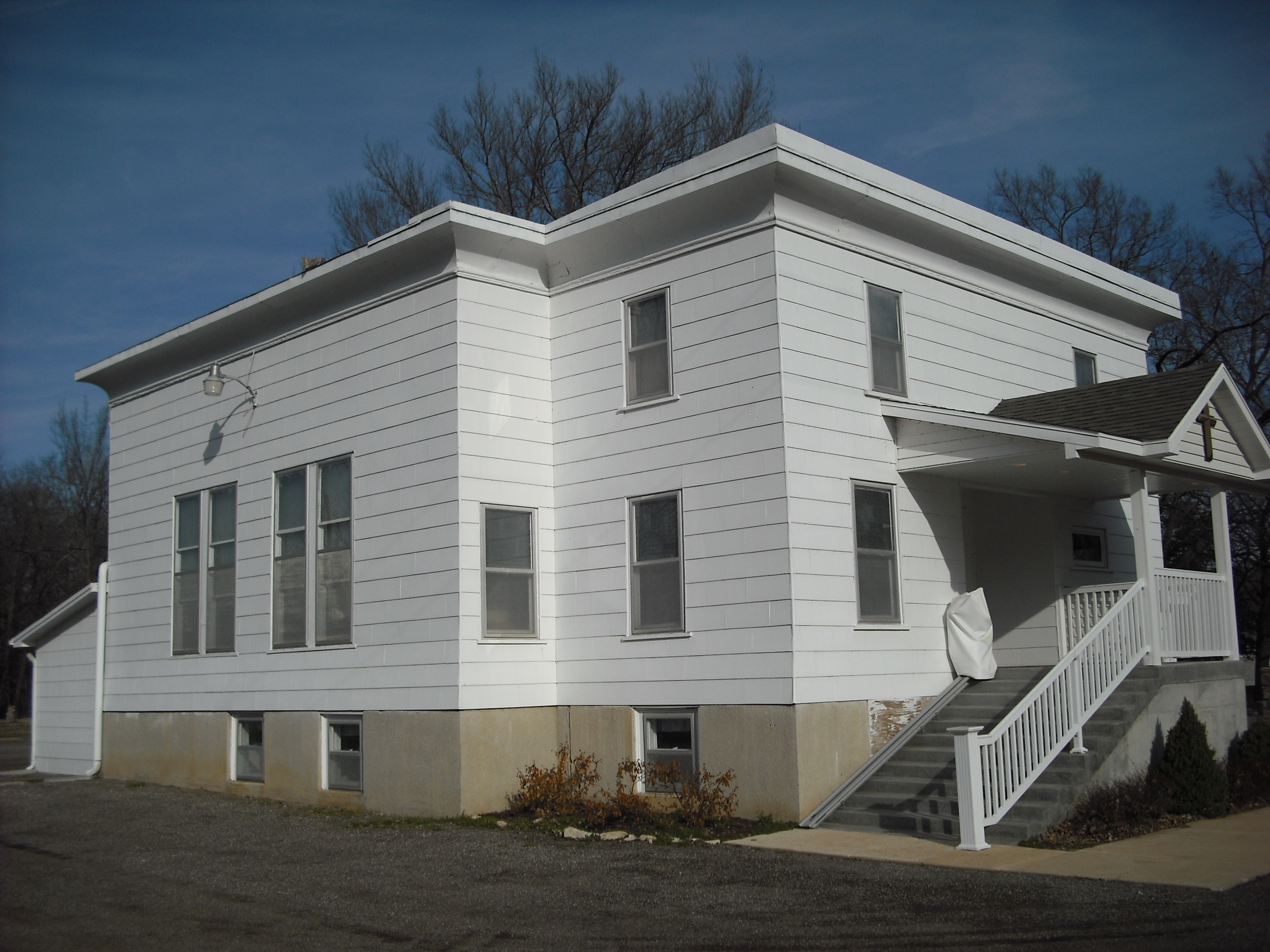
- Lone Star Church of the Brethren (2009)

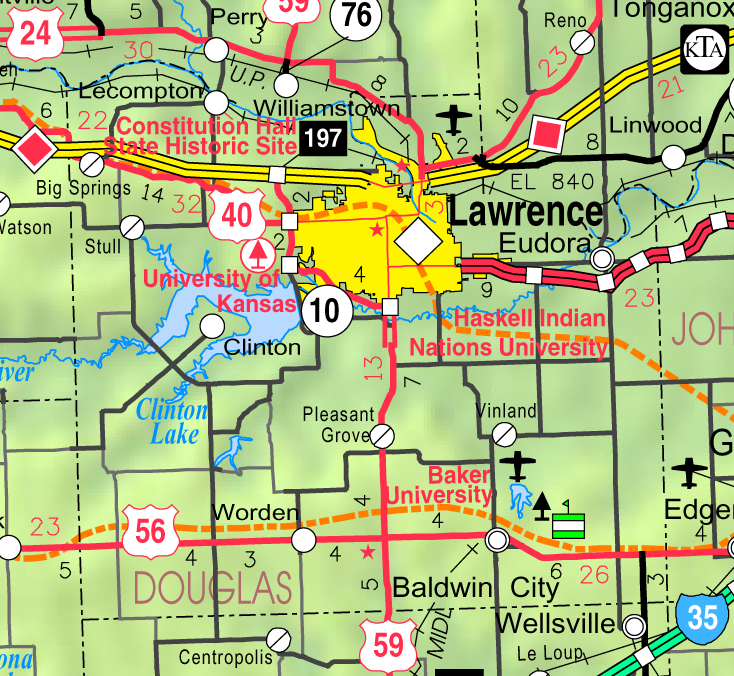
- KDOT map of Douglas County (legend)

- Location within Kansas Location within the United States
- Coordinates: 38°52′0″N 95°21′19″W
- Country: United States
- State: Kansas
- County: Douglas
- Elevation: 879 ft (268 m)
- Time zone: UTC-6 (CST)
  - Summer (DST): UTC-5 (CDT)
- Area code: 785
- FIPS code: 20-42475
- GNIS ID: 479512

Lone Star is an unincorporated community in Douglas County, Kansas, United States. It is located 7 miles (11 km) southwest of Lawrence.

== History ==
The first settlers arrived in 1854, many of whom were either southern colonists or sympathizers who wanted slavery to be legal in the Kansas Territory. However, by 1860, many of these individuals had returned to the south or given up the cause. When William Quantrill razed Lawrence in 1863, some of his men traveled down south and passed near Lone Star.

The settlement was initially known as "Bond"—which was the name of its first postmaster. The post office was open from 1875 until 1953. According to the Lawrence Journal-World Lone Star was named as such after a group of settlers saw a star in the sky while trying to think of a suitable name for their community's school.

Near Lone Star is Lone Star Lake which was built by the Civilian Lone Star Lake Park Conservation Corps in the 1930s.
