= Jeffrey Messenger =

American politician from Missouri

Member of the Missouri House of Representatives from the 130th district
- In office January 9, 2013 – January 6, 2021
- Preceded by: Bill Reiboldt
- Succeeded by: Bishop Davidson

Personal details
- Born: November 28, 1949 (age 76) Scott City, Kansas, U.S.
- Party: Republican
- Spouse: Wanda
- Children: 2
- Profession: businessman

Jeffrey Messenger (born November 28, 1949) is an American politician. He is a former member of the Missouri House of Representatives from the 130th district from 2013 to 2021. He is a member of the Republican party.
