= Cheryle Perkins =

American politician

Member-elect of the Missouri House of Representatives from the 160th district
- Assuming office January 6, 2027
- Succeeding: Ben Baker

Personal details
- Party: Republican
- Website: Campaign website

Cheryle Perkins is an American politician of the Missouri Republican Party who is the representative-elect for the 160th district in the Missouri House of Representatives. She was elected in the 2026 general election. She defeated Democrat candidate Angela Thomas. Perkins was County Assessor of Newton County, Missouri.
