= Bill Reiboldt =

American politician

Member of the Missouri House of Representatives from the 160th district
- In office January 9, 2013 – January 9, 2019
- Preceded by: Ellen Brandom
- Succeeded by: Ben Baker

Member of the Missouri House of Representatives from the 130th district
- In office January 5, 2011 – January 9, 2013
- Preceded by: Kevin Wilson
- Succeeded by: Jeffrey Messenger

Personal details
- Born: August 1, 1948 (age 77) Neosho, Missouri, U.S.
- Party: Republican
- Profession: Businessman, farmer

Bill Reiboldt (born August 1, 1948) is an American politician. He was a member of the Missouri House of Representatives, having served from 2011 to 2019. He is a member of the Republican party.
