= Green Valley, Illinois =

Green Valley
- Village
- Location of Green Valley in Tazewell County, Illinois.
- Coordinates: 40°24′26″N 89°38′39″W
- Country: United States
- State: Illinois
- County: Tazewell

Area
  - Total: 0.30 sq mi (0.78 km^{2})
  - Land: 0.30 sq mi (0.78 km^{2})
  - Water: 0 sq mi (0.00 km^{2})
- Elevation: 535 ft (163 m)

Population (2020)
  - Total: 630
  - Density: 2,093.7/sq mi (808.38/km^{2})
- Time zone: UTC-6 (CST)
  - Summer (DST): UTC-5 (CDT)
- ZIP code: 61534
- Area code: 309
- FIPS code: 17-31563
- GNIS feature ID: 2398203
- Website: villageofgvil.org

Green Valley is a village in Tazewell County, Illinois, United States. It is south of Pekin near the county border along Illinois State Route 29. The population was 630 at the 2020 census.

== Geography ==
According to the 2010 census, Green Valley has a total area of 0.3 square miles (0.78 km^{2}), all land.

== Demographics ==
Historical population
Census	Pop.	Note	%±
1880	145		—
1920	446		—
1930	454		1.8%
1940	516		13.7%
1950	503		−2.5%
1960	552		9.7%
1970	617		11.8%
1980	768		24.5%
1990	745		−3.0%
2000	728		−2.3%
2010	709		−2.6%
2020	630		−11.1%
U.S. Decennial Census

As of the census of 2000, there were 728 people, 262 households, and 205 families residing in the village. The population density was 2,360.6 inhabitants per square mile (911.4/km^{2}). There were 280 housing units at an average density of 907.9 per square mile (350.5/km^{2}). The racial makeup of the village was 99.04% White, 0.14% African American, 0.27% Native American, 0.27% Asian, and 0.27% from two or more races. Hispanic or Latino of any race were 0.69% of the population.

There were 262 households, out of which 41.2% had children under the age of 18 living with them, 66.8% were married couples living together, 8.0% had a female householder with no husband present, and 21.4% were non-families. 19.8% of all households were made up of individuals, and 9.9% had someone living alone who was 65 years of age or older. The average household size was 2.73 and the average family size was 3.13.

In the village, the population was spread out, with 29.4% under the age of 18, 9.1% from 18 to 24, 28.8% from 25 to 44, 20.6% from 45 to 64, and 12.1% who were 65 years of age or older. The median age was 34 years. For every 100 females, there were 83.8 males. For every 100 females age 18 and over, there were 88.3 males.

The median income for a household in the village was $40,833, and the median income for a family was $50,268. Males had a median income of $39,196 versus $22,353 for females. The per capita income for the village was $17,830. About 5.4% of families and 7.5% of the population were below the poverty line, including 5.8% of those under age 18 and 8.6% of those age 65 or over.

== Education ==
The school district is Midwest Central Community Unit School District 191.
