= Ellen Brandom =

American politician (1942–2026)

Member of the Missouri House of Representatives from the 160th district
- In office January 3, 2007 – January 9, 2013
- Preceded by: Peter C. Myers
- Succeeded by: Bill Reiboldt

Personal details
- Born: March 29, 1942 Quincy, Illinois, U.S.
- Died: September 12, 2026 (aged 84)
- Party: Republican

Ellen Brandom (March 29, 1942 – September 12, 2026) was an American politician who served in the Missouri House of Representatives from the 160th district from 2007 to 2013. She died on September 12, 2026, at the age of 84.
