= Kessler, Ohio =

Unincorporated community in Ohio, U.S.

Coordinates: 39°58′40″N 84°17′25″W

Kessler is an unincorporated community in Miami County, in the U.S. state of Ohio.

== History ==
A post office called Kessler was established in 1862, and remained in operation until 1913. Besides the post office, Kessler had a railroad station and grain elevator.
