= Petland =

Chain of pet stores

Petland, Inc.
- Type: Pet Store
- Industry: Retail
- Founded: 1967; 59 years ago Chillicothe, Ohio, U.S.
- Founder: Ed Kunzelman
- Headquarters: Chillicothe, Ohio, U.S.
- Key people: Ed Kunzelman, founder and chairman
- Subsidiaries: Aquarium Adventure
- Website: www.petland.com

Petland is a privately owned operator and franchisor of pet stores based in Chillicothe, Ohio. Ed Kunzelman founded the company in 1967. Petland currently operates 131 stores in the United States, and at least 63 in foreign markets including Canada, Japan, China, Mexico, Brazil and El Salvador. The chain is notable for its controversy over documentation from the Humane Society of the United States revealing the purchase of dogs from puppy mills.

== History ==
Petland was started in 1967 when Kunzelman opened up his first store in Chillicothe, Ohio. The company originally owned and operated pet stores in Ohio, West Virginia, and Kentucky. In the early 1980s, Petland began expanding its presence and entered foreign markets.

The 2008 financial crisis and subsequent public relations issues have drastically affected Petland. Petland currently operates 84 domestic locations, down from over 140 stores just a few years ago. The company currently sells birds, fish, small animals, puppies, and kittens.

While Petland has endorsed efforts to raise standards at commercial dog breeding kennels, the company continues to find itself in the middle of animal welfare controversies. In 2018, a delivery vehicle at a Petland store in Florida was searched by authorities. Nearly 2 dozen puppies were seized due to the conditions they were in. The year before, the Henderson, NV Petland store was fined for keeping sick dogs in overcrowded conditions.

=== Petland South Africa ===
Petland was introduced to South Africa as a franchise in 1999. They currently have three stores located in and around Durban including uMhlanga Rocks, Salt Rock and Durban North. Petland stores in South Africa stock animal and pet products such as food and accessories for cats, dogs, birds, reptiles and small animal products as well as holding fish and small animal livestock.

=== Petland Canada ===
Petland Canada Inc., is a privately held Canadian Corporation founded in 1975 that operates out of Winnipeg, Manitoba, Canada.

== Charitable programs ==
=== Pets in the Classroom ===
Petland participates in the Pets in the Classroom program of the Pet Care Trust. This program was established to give teachers additional resources to acquire and care for classroom animals. Teachers can get grants for new animals, pet environments, food, and other supplies. This program started in 2010. As of July 2014, 40,111 grants had been issued.

=== Adopt-a-Pet ===
Under the Adopt-a-Pet program started in 1998, Petland staff work with animal shelters, animal rescue groups, and individual activists to place homeless animals including puppies, dogs, kittens, cats, and various small animals in homes. Many Petland locations use their storefronts to display these animals. This program also raises money for animal welfare organizations. This program has homed hundreds of thousands of pets. These pets receive basic veterinary care and vaccinations before being placed. In some cases, adoptive families are charged a small fee for de-sexing. Generally, intact pets are sent home with a certificate good for a free spay or neuter at a local veterinary clinic. Some Petland stores micro-chip all participating animals.

== Animal welfare controversy ==
Petland claims they do not source from "puppy mills" and obtain puppies from USDA-licensed and inspected breeders with clean records, hobby breeders with three or fewer breeding females, and animal rescue organizations. Many Petland locations claim to only offer dogs from animal welfare organizations; however a report from the Humane Society of the United States in 2009 revealed that allegedly "almost every Petland store in the country is buying puppies from large-scale 'middleman' brokers that deal with puppy mills, and some are continuing to buy directly from known puppy mills". While Petland has claimed that puppies are sourced from family raised breeders, breeders with clean records, and rescues only, reports have been made public published by the Humane Society of the United States reporting that some parts of the chain have purchased dogs from commercial breeding farms selling "over 5,000 puppies a year" and breeders with animal welfare violations.

In addition to investigations conducted by The Humane Society of the United States, a past and current class action lawsuit and over 500 negative reviews on ConsumerAffairs.com also state that Petland receives many dogs from puppy mills. Though seen as controversial Petland is partnered with the AKC (American Kennel Club) who have standards on canine bloodline and health as well as having all of their puppies registered. Petland does not provide AKC registration documentation on each puppy but does market a paper "registration", a full health warranty (requires using a Petland authorized Vet), microchipping, breeder information, pedigree (showing significant inbreeding or otherwise), a 25 point inspection of the puppy performed by two separate veterinarians and well as many other reputable attributes. Petland guarantees their animals health and bloodline as well as performing daily exams on each puppy and charting their day to day progress and health. They individualize their care accordingly to each animal specifically.

== Sources ==
- Multistate Outbreak of Multidrug-Resistant Campylobacter Infections Linked to Contact with Pet Store Puppies | Multistate Outbreak of Human Campylobacter Infections Linked to Pet Store Puppies | September 2017 | Salmonella | CDC
