= Lone Star Lake =

185 acre lake located in Kansas

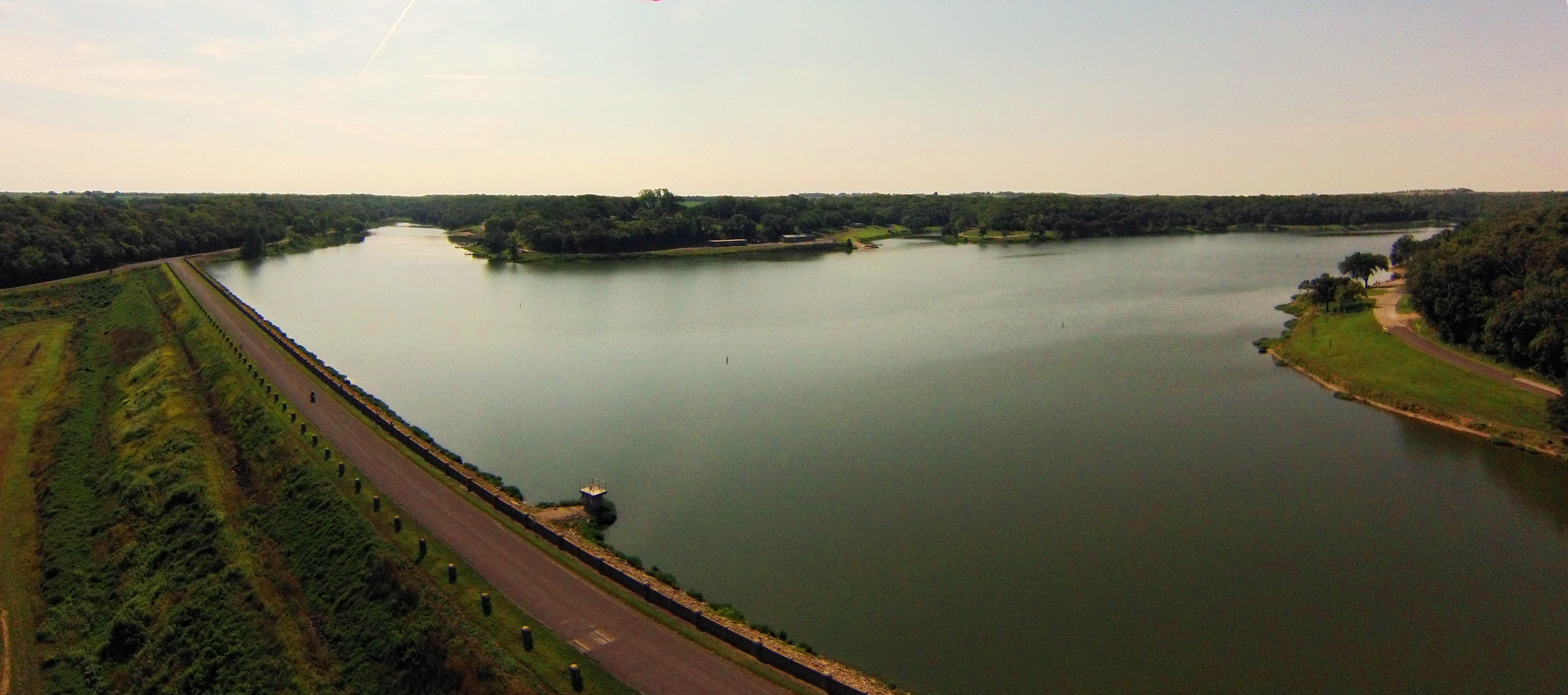

- Lone Star Lake
- Location: Douglas County, Kansas
- Coordinates: 38°49′59″N 95°22′55″W
- Type: Lake
- Primary inflows: Washington Creek
- Primary outflows: Washington Creek
- Basin countries: United States
- Managing agency: Douglas County, Kansas
- Construction engineer: Paulett and Wilson, Professional Engineers
- Surface area: 185 acres (75 ha)
- Surface elevation: 950 ft (290 m)

Lone Star Lake is a 185 acres (75 ha) lake located in Douglas County, in the U.S. state of Kansas. The lake lies to the southwest of the unincorporated community of Lone Star, Kansas. Lone Star Lake Park surrounds the lake and offers camping, picnic shelters, and a swimming beach. The lake and park are owned and operated by Douglas County.

The Civilian Lone Star Lake Park Conservation Corps began construction of the lake in 1934 for the Forestry Fish and Game Commission. Unable to continue financing construction, the Commission transferred the Lone Star Lake Project to Douglas County in 1937. The lake was completed in 1939. The Clean Lakes Act provided for rehabilitation in 1981, including shoreline restoration and improving water quality. The spillway was completely reconstructed beginning in 2000 due to severe erosion.
