= 2019 Linwood tornado =

2019 EF4 tornado in Kansas, U.S.

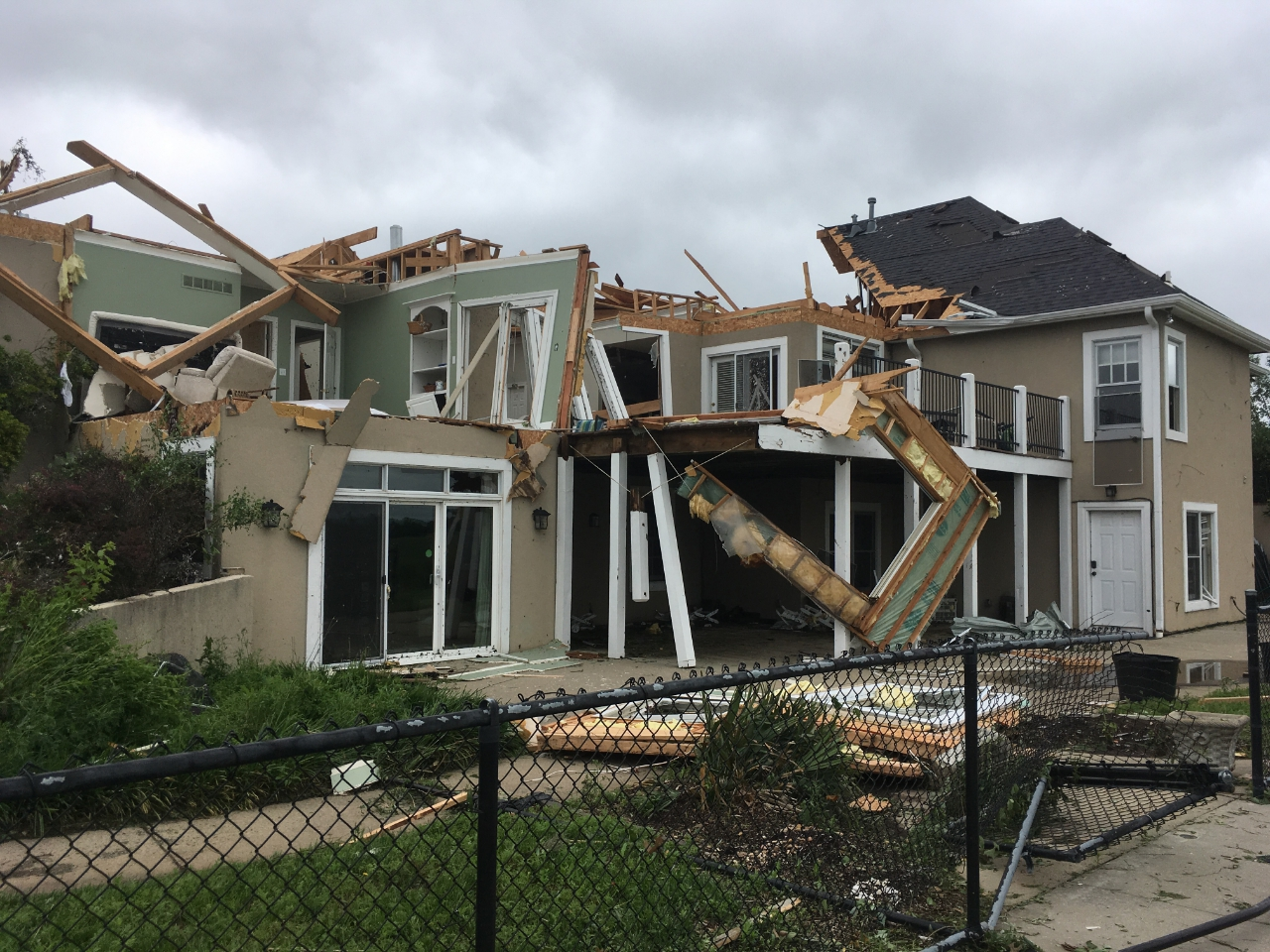
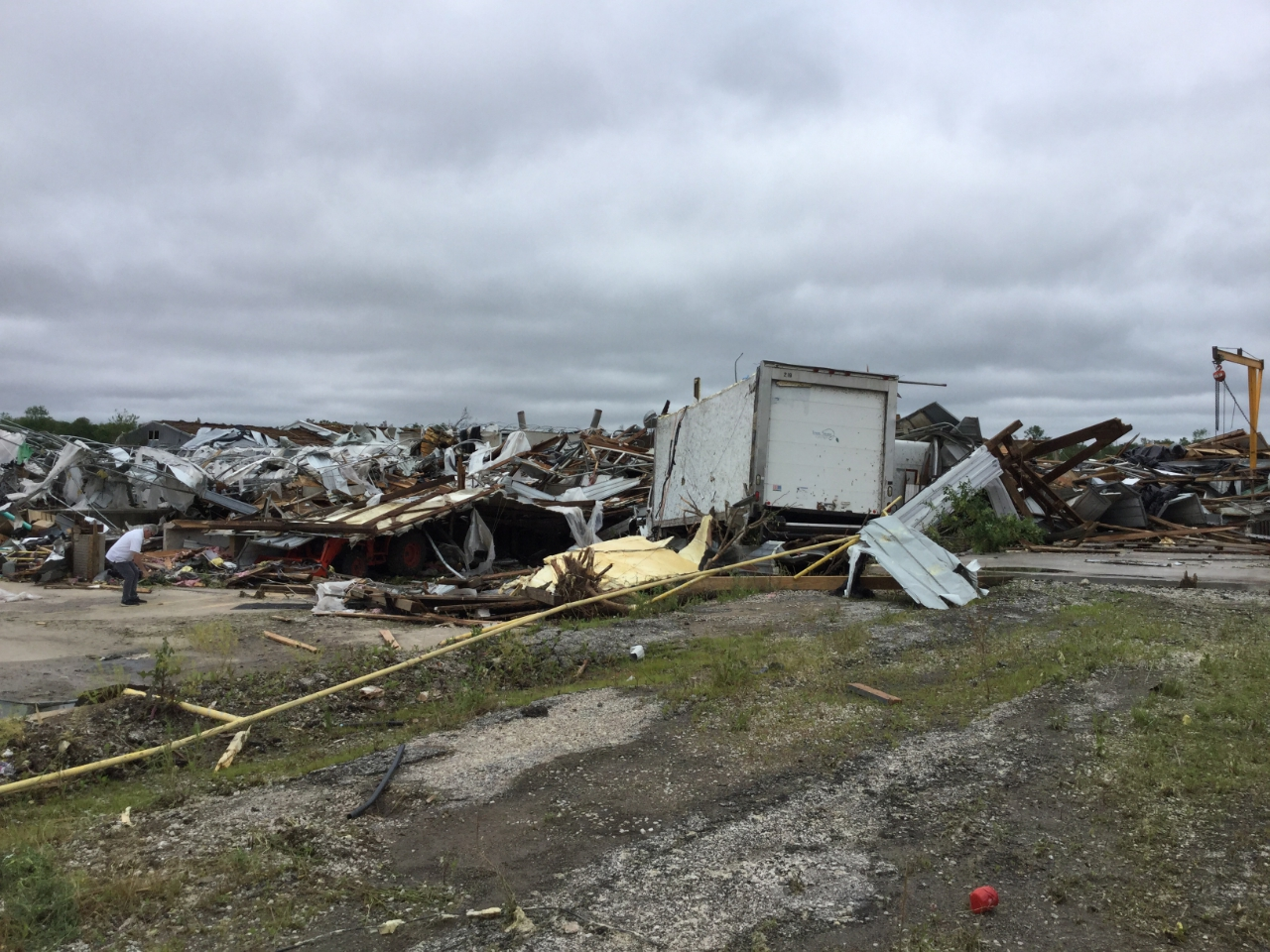
- Clockwise from the top: A video still of the EF4 wedge tornado near Linwood, a specialized rocket probe launches into the storm, a plant wholesaler in Linwood flattened at EF2 intensity, a residence south of Lawrence with EF3 roof damage, a Next-Generation weather radar loop of the supercell and its tornadoes

Meteorological history
- Formed: May 28, 2019, 6:05 PM CDT (UTC−05:00)
- Dissipated: May 28, 2019, 7:00 PM CDT (UTC−05:00)
- Duration: 55 minutes

EF4 tornado
- on the Enhanced Fujita scale
- Max width: 1,760 yards (1.00 mi; 1.61 km)
- Path length: 29.07 miles (46.78 km)
- Highest winds: Official intensity: 170 mph (270 km/h); Measured winds: 85.1 m/s (190 mph; 306 km/h) (Instantaneous wind gust estimated by SRV Dominator rocket probe)

Overall effects
- Fatalities: 0
- Injuries: 4
- Damage: $48 million (2019 USD) ($60,450,000 in 2025 USD)
- Areas affected: Western Kansas City metro area; specifically around Lone Star, Lawrence, Eudora, Linwood and Bonner Springs, Kansas, United States
- Part of the Tornado outbreak of May 25–30, 2019 and Tornadoes of 2019

In the early evening of Tuesday, May 28, 2019, a large and heavily rainwrapped wedge tornado, (Note: A wedge tornado is a slang term used by meteorology researchers, and storm chasers or spotters, to refer to a tornado that is visually wider (horizontally) than it is tall (vertically). Rainwrapped tornadoes are tornadoes that are obscured by heavy rainfall, with these often being harder, if not impossible to spot and confirm.) struck the western Kansas City metropolitan area, across Douglas and Leavenworth Counties in eastern Kansas. It was the second violent (F4/EF4+) tornado to occur during a five-day long tornado outbreak across the United States, which spawned approximately 182 tornadoes, with the first EF4 tornado occurring a day prior in the Dayton area in Ohio. In its wake, the tornado caused $48 million USD in total damages within the two counties, with nearby areas in the vicinity or within southeastern Lawrence, and Linwood taking the worst damage during the event. According to the National Weather Service weather forecasting offices (WFOs) in both Topeka, Kansas, and Kansas City in Missouri, the tornado was ultimately rated as low-end EF4 on the Enhanced Fujita scale, with estimated winds of 170 mph (270 km/h), though a storm chasing research team found winds of 190 mph (310 km/h) from a rocket probe.

The tornado traveled 29.07 miles (46.78 km) through portions of the two counties, nearly granting it long-track status. (Note: Long-track is defined as traversing 30–60 miles (48–97 km) or more.) It reached a maximum width of a mile, or 1,760 yards (1.61 km) during its 55-minute lifespan across portions of the western Kansas City metropolitan area. It caused four injuries and no reported fatalities, before dissipating west of Bonner Springs, Kansas. The tornado, per the National Centers for Environmental Information as of June 2026, was the last violent tornado to take place in Kansas, and in the U.S. during the 2010s.

== Meteorological synopsis ==
=== Episode narrative ===
==== The night prior ====
At approximately past 8:00 PM CDT (01:00 UTC) on Memorial Day, May 27, 2019, the NOAA Storm Prediction Center (NOAA SPC) issued two level 3/5 enhanced risk outlooks for portions of the western and eastern regions of the central United States. The western enhanced risk was situated over the High Plains, across parts of western Nebraska, northeastern Colorado and extreme northwestern Kansas. The eastern sector was situated primarily on the Indiana/Ohio state border region, along with a sliver of the risk also in extreme southern Michigan. Attention was mainly put over in that region along the Great Lakes, as a threat for severe weather, in the form of thunderstorms, large hail, and damaging wind gusts were predicted to take place during the evening of May 27. A 10% hatched, (Note: Hatched risks refer to a 10% chance of significant severe weather events taking place within 25 miles (40 km) of any set point in the forecasted area of risk.: For tornadoes, it could mean for those of EF2 strength or stronger.; For thunderstorms wind gusts, it could be interpreted for hurricane-force winds of 74 miles per hour (119 km/h) or higher.; For hail, a diameter of 2 inches (5.1 cm) or greater is guaranteed to likely occur.) tornado contour was outlined over the upper Ohio River Valley, while two 5% tornado risk zones existed over the eastern Texas Panhandle and northwestern Oklahoma, and another from north-central Kansas northwestwards to the Nebraska Panhandle and northeast Colorado.

==== Hours in advance ====
NOAA SPC storm outlooks on May 28, 2019. (Note: The "z" timestamp indicators refer to Zulu military time zones, named after the NATO phonetic alphabet. Zulu time zones are equal to Universal Coordinated Time.)

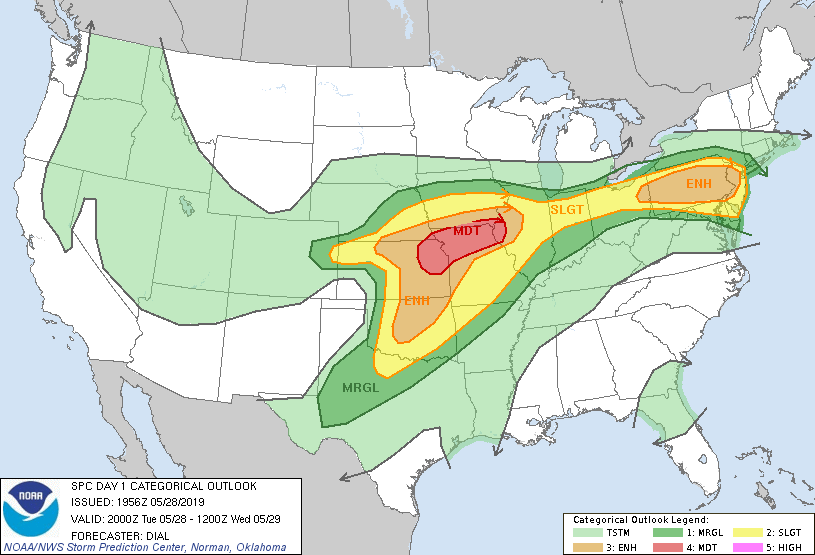
Day 1 2000z categorical outlooks

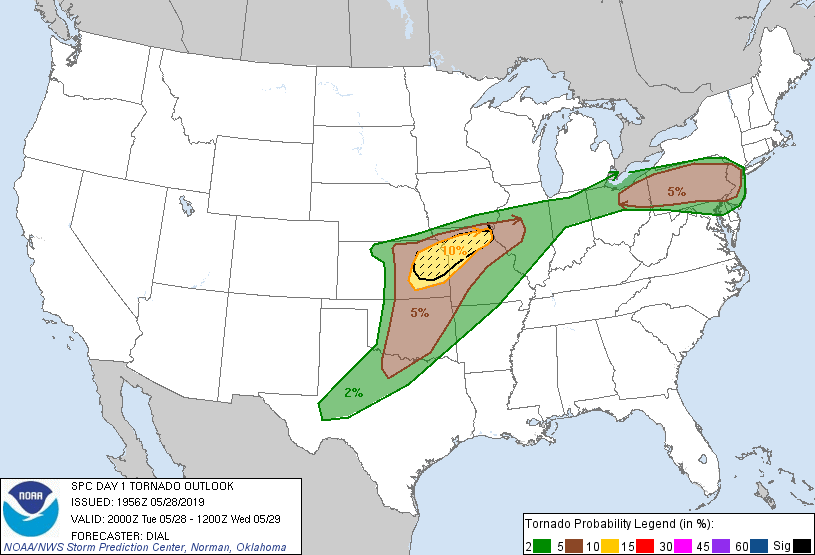
Day 1 2000z tornado outlooks

Day 1 2000z hail outlooks

Day 1 2000z wind outlooks

Into the overnight hours at around 2:00 AM CDT (07:00 UTC) on Tuesday, May 28, the SPC forecasts were changed to include a large enhanced risk over the eastern Great Plains and Midwest, which spanned over northern Oklahoma, eastern Kansas, western and northern Missouri, southern Iowa, and extreme western Illinois. A second enhanced zone also was spread over predominantly Pennsylvania. In the Great Plains sector, 10% and 30% hatched tornado and damaging wind contours were set up across the Iowa/Missouri state border region, while a 30% hatched threat for large hail stretched from southwestern Iowa to northern Oklahoma. It was cited that severe weather was to be initiated by a slow and eastward moving, upper-level trough that was certain to move into the region. Just before 8:30 AM CDT (13:30 UTC) the same day, the SPC issued a "Public Severe Weather Outlook" (PWO) and a level 4/5 categorical moderate risk over in the Great Plains sector, from northeastern Kansas to western Illinois. A 15% tornado risk was stationed over the Iowa/Kansas/Missouri/Nebraska quad-state border area, with an extensive 10% hatched risk that sat in the same spot as the categorical level 4/5 risk. Two large 30% hatched wind and hail outlooks also were forecasted over the region.

Around 11:30 AM CDT (16:30 UTC) or five hours since the last forecast, SPC meteorologists downgraded the tornado potential from a 15% to a 10% risk, though the hatched zone stayed. A closed, mid-level low-pressure area that originated from Colorado, was predicted to slowly move to the northeast towards Nebraska overnight. At the surface, a cyclone stationed in north-central Kansas moved east-northeast into extreme northwestern Missouri. Accompanying the cyclone, a cold front trailed southeastward across western and central Kansas, into parts of northwestern Texas and the Oklahoma Panhandle area. Located south of the cyclone, a dry line was forecasted to sharpen over western Oklahoma and northwestern Texas. East of the low, a deep east-west front, supported by a convective gust front in the morning hours, was to persist across northeastern Kansas and northern Missouri. These surface fronts provided the main foci for the development of severe thunderstorms. There was a possibility that elevated thunderstorms, (Note: Elevated and surface-based storms differentiate with each other with the height of their base: the bottom side of a thunderstorm.: Elevated thunderstorms are high-based storms and develop over a stable surface layer, compared to their surface-based counterparts. These storms are less likely to produce tornadoes due to limited surface inflow, but are capable to generate large and damaging hail, and sometimes strong winds.; Surface-based thunderstorms form by rising air parcels within a warm and moist surface layer of the atmosphere. These storms feed off instability, and commonly form within a warm sector as opposed to their elevated parallels, which occur usually in a cold sector. A surface-based thunderstorm is more likely to turn into a rotating supercell, because its base is connected right away with the ground-layer of the atmosphere, allowing them to tap into low-level wind shear.) could persist into the afternoon as low-level winds destabilize and convection began interacting with a baroclinic zone, in northeast Kansas. The convection was certain to occur at surface-level at noon, in an environment that was favorable for supercell development. The likelihood of tornadoes was there for any semi-discrete supercell in this region, alongside more complex storm-boundary interactions. Forecasters also noted the possibility of a mesoscale convective system (MCS) being inevitable, as convection were to grow upscale into the later noon hours. The MCS was expected traverse across the Iowa/Missouri border region during the evening, with an accompanying damaging wind and large hail threat.

=== Event narrative ===
A tornado watch that was issued for parts of Kansas and Missouri

==== Ongoing thunderstorms ====
Past 12:00 PM CDT (17:00 UTC) on May 28, the SPC issued a mesoscale discussion (MCD) pertaining the probability to issue a tornado watch for eastern Kansas and northwestern Missouri, as the likelihood of tornadoes became more evident. A cluster of severe thunderstorms moved in a northeastward trajectory, however remained elevated due to the Mean Layer Convective Inhibition (MLCIN) remaining put per one mesoanalysis issued an hour earlier, at 11:00 AM CDT (16:00 UTC). Despite the MLCIN in place, reports of severe hail emerged from Marion County, Kansas, due to some supportive factors. Atmospheric soundings suggested that the mid-level capping inversion was to decay by 1:00 PM CDT (18:00 UTC). Next to that, additional convection was thought to develop in the vicinity of the warm front and warm sector, (Note: Warm and cold sectors, refer to two regions of air masses that trail alongside cold and warm fronts.: A warm sector usually sits in between the cold and warm fronts, with these traditionally oriented west and north of the warm air mass. This is where the warmest air is to be found within a weather system.; A cold sector sits just west of the cold front, with the region seeing much cooler temperatures due to colder winds coming from the north. This is parallel to the warm sector, which receives warmer air from the south.) in a large area of northeastern Kansas. Any storms that were located in the cluster became surface-based and latch onto the warm front, were to pose a tornado threat due to the enhancement of low-level wind shear being present from the aforementioned front.

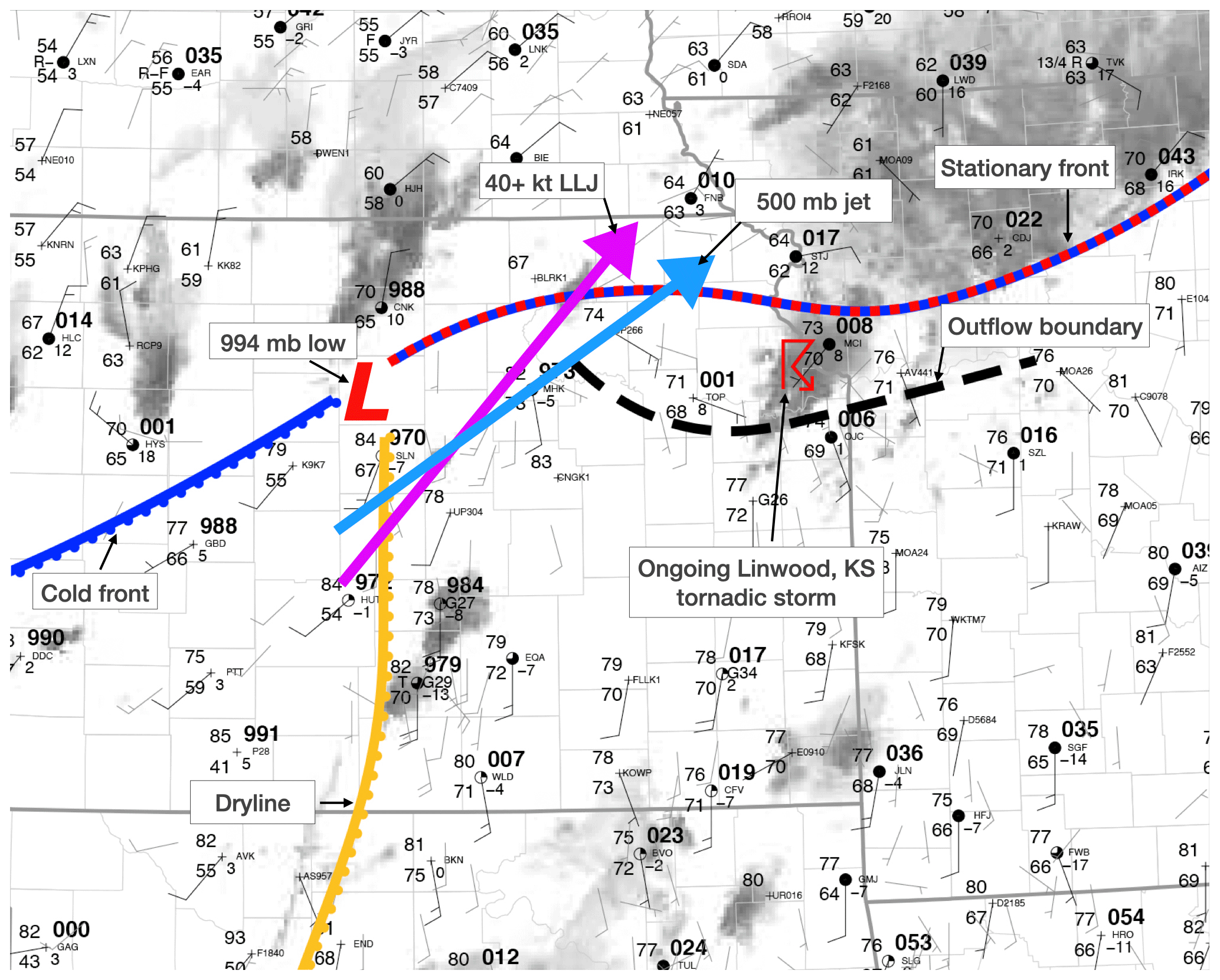
Synoptic environment map over eastern Kansas during the then ongoing EF4 tornado

By nearly 3:00 PM (20:00 UTC), the final outlooks were issued. Vertical wind profiles and 40–50 kn (46–58 mph; 74–93 km/h) bulk shear, were helpful enough to sustain supercells with damaging hail. The low-level mesocyclone and tornado threat continued to rise, particularly toward the evening. This was especially due to the low-level jet streak, which deepened and augmented per the 0–1 km (0.00–0.62 mi) hodograph.

==== Initiation of the parent supercell ====
Around the same time the 2000z storm outlooks were issued, a supercell fired up in the open warm sector over the Flint Hills, soon responsible for the EF4 tornado and other tornadoes in a family. The storm organized as it approached the potent gust front to the southwest of Kansas City. Issued at 5:12 PM CDT (22:12 UTC), another MCD cited about intense thunderstorm development occurring in an area from Emporia to Topeka, Kansas, as well to the north of the stalled gust front from St. Joseph, Missouri in the direction of the Iowa/Missouri border, which is generally centered in a zone of warm advection on the nose of the plume of dry, capping-Elevated Mixed Layer (EML) air. This lift, which when added alongside with the seasonably high moist inflow, and characterized by potent Convective Available Potential Energy (CAPE) values of 2000 joules per kilogram or greater, was expected to aid in upscale convective growth towards the early evening.

== Tornado summary ==
=== Initial EF2 tornado and Silver Lining Tours incident ===
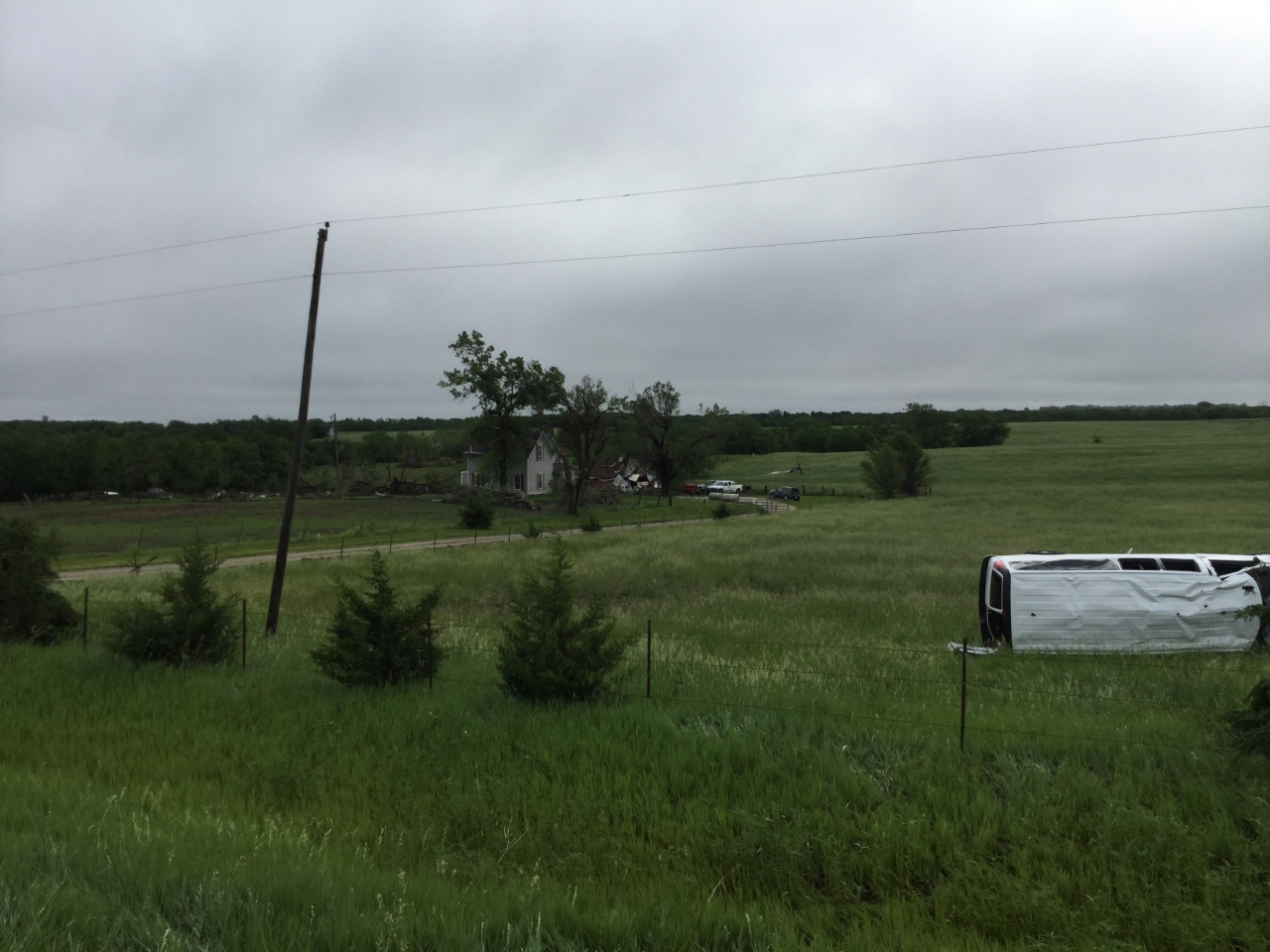
A storm chasing tour van is seen flipped over

Prior to the formation of the EF4 Linwood tornado, a preceding EF2 tornado from the same supercell storm impacted areas east of Overbrook, along the border between Osage and Douglas Counties, Kansas. This tornado struck a convoy of vans operated by Silver Lining Tours, a touring organization specialized in storm chasing. A dozen people, mainly tour guests and operators, were injured as this extremely rainwrapped and strong tornado threw vehicles around without warning. This significant tornado the supercell spawned, was estimated to have winds of 115 mph (185 km/h), and lasted from 5:54 PM CDT (22:54 UTC), to 6:06 PM CDT (23:06 UTC). The storm itself stayed over rural areas, impacting mainly trees and a few farmsteads. It traveled along a path 10.69 mi (17.20 km) long, and 200 yd (0.11 mi; 0.18 km) wide.

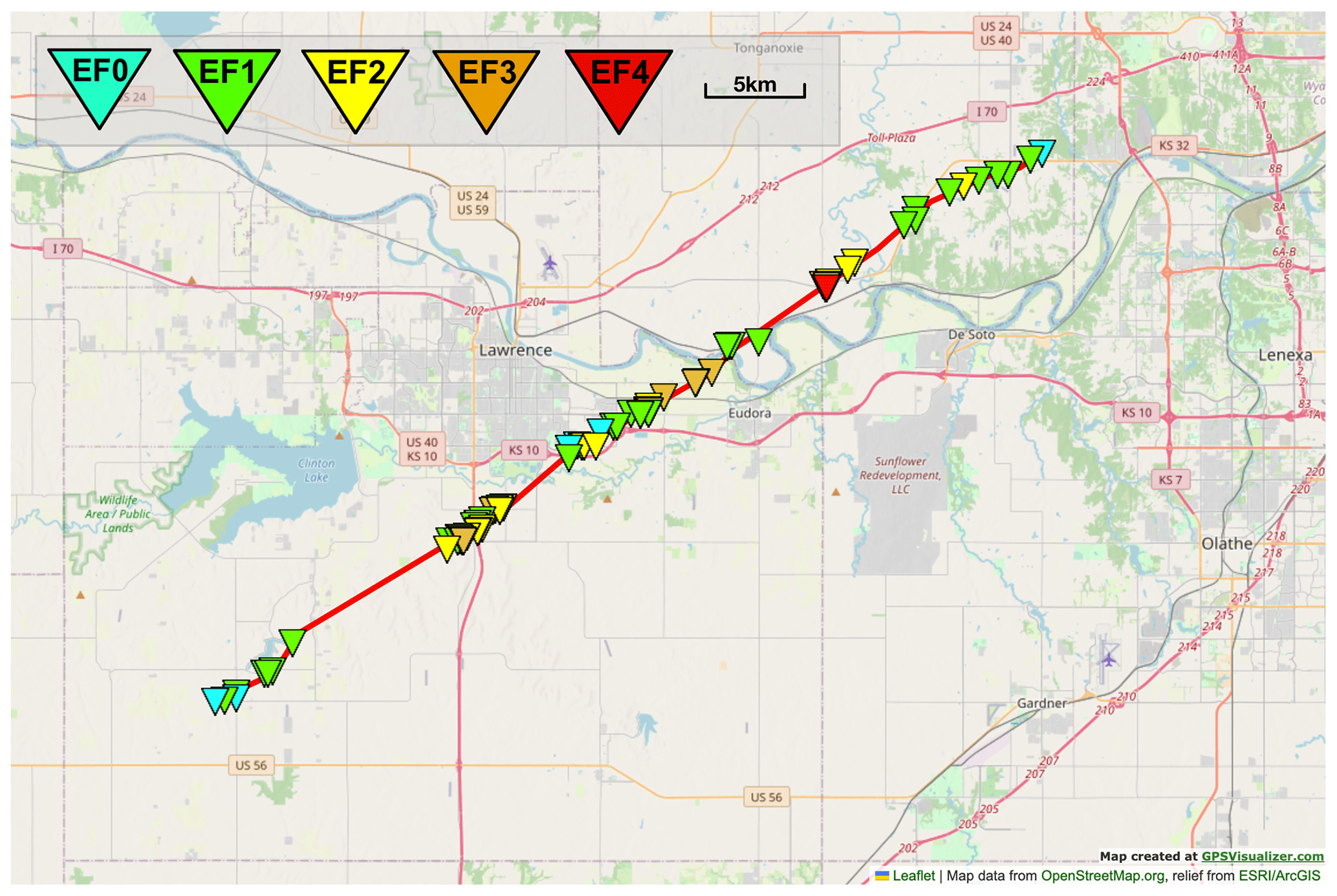
Track of the EF4 tornado throughout Douglas and Leavenworth Counties Parameter info EF0 / 65–85 mph EF1 / 86–110 mph EF2 / 111–135 mph EF3 / 136–165 mph EF4 / 166–200 mph ⎯ Center of the tornado

=== Formation of EF4 tornado near Lone Star and Lake ===
As the initial EF2 tornado was nearing the end of its life, a second tornado touched down next to Lone Star Lake, and immediately became cloaked in rain at 6:05 PM CDT (23:05 UTC). This new tornado intensified from EF0−EF1 intensity along County Road 1 East, before absorbing the circulation of the first tornado. After crossing North 750th Road, south-southeast of Lone Star, the new tornado became intense as it intensified to EF3 intensity, debarking trees along Chicken Creek with winds upwards of 140 mph (230 km/h). To the northeast, the tornado expanded in width but also weakened slightly, as a swath of EF2 tree damage occurred before the tornado restrengthened to EF3 intensity again. Along East 1000 Road, the tornado impacted a home with winds estimated at 160 mph (260 km/h), leveling the residence and destroying a garage that was properly bolted to its sill plates. Across the road, trees were debarked and outbuildings were completely destroyed by the tornado at EF2−EF3 intensity.

=== Outskirts of Lawrence and northeastern Douglas County ===
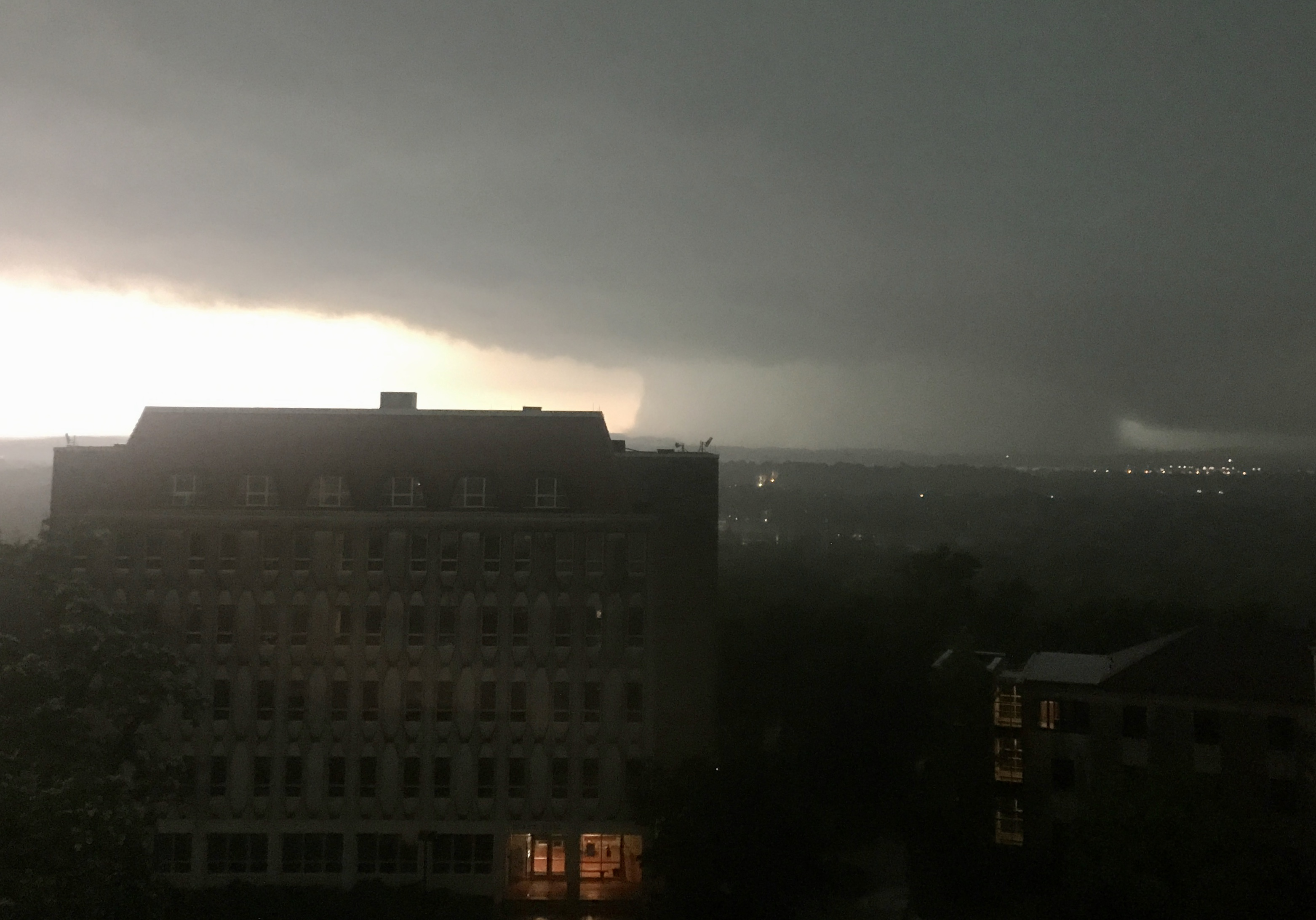
A view of the rainwrapped tornado from the 6th floor of Fraser Hall at the University of Kansas

The large and shrouded wedge tornado continued to move across portions of central Douglas County at EF2 intensity, until it was closing in on US 59, south of Lawrence. Just before crossing the highway, the tornado caused exterior wall and roof damage to two homes along North 1000 Road with low-end EF3 winds of 138 mph (222 km/h). As the tornado was about to pass over the highway, storm chaser and meteorologist Reed Timmer, alongside Team Dominator, launched a rocket probe from a specialized interceptor vehicle. The rocket was launched into the tornado and recorded winds of 190 mph (310 km/h) within the storm's circulation, while also recording barometric pressure drops. Shortly after crossing US 59, the tornado impacted a cul-de-sac, where one home sustained severe EF3 damage, as estimated winds of 145 mph (233 km/h) tore through. To the northeast along North 1100 Road, two residencies were impacted at EF3 intensity, with one of the homes heavily destroyed, and a pickup truck that was rolled into a shed by mid-range EF3 winds of 150 mph (240 km/h). At around 6:11 PM CDT (23:11 UTC) the National Weather Service WFO in Topeka, issued a PDS tornado warning for areas in northeastern Douglas County. The warning was issued due to the potentially life-threatening situation created by the tornado. Seven minutes later, the WFO upgraded the severity level, and issued a tornado emergency at 6:18 PM CDT (23:18 UTC).

Weakening to EF2 strength, the tornado impacted the far southeastern outskirts of Lawrence as it crossed K-10. The tornado only impacted a few structures, and mostly trees as it paralleled the highway at EF0−EF1 intensity. After leaving the Lawrence area, crossing a highway interchange, the tornado continued into open farmland and caused EF1 damage trees in the area. Shortly after crossing the three-way junction connecting both North 1400 and East 1850 Roads, the tornado rapidly attained EF3 intensity as it struck a daycare center. The director, alongside her children and three employees, were inside when the tornado struck. The walls of the daycare collapsed, and other parts of the building were destroyed by 145 mph (233 km/h) winds. From this point onward the tornado stayed mostly over open fields, though occasionally causing EF3 damage to farmsteads and homes northwest of Eudora, and other parts of northeastern Douglas County, primarily to a few homes and trees.

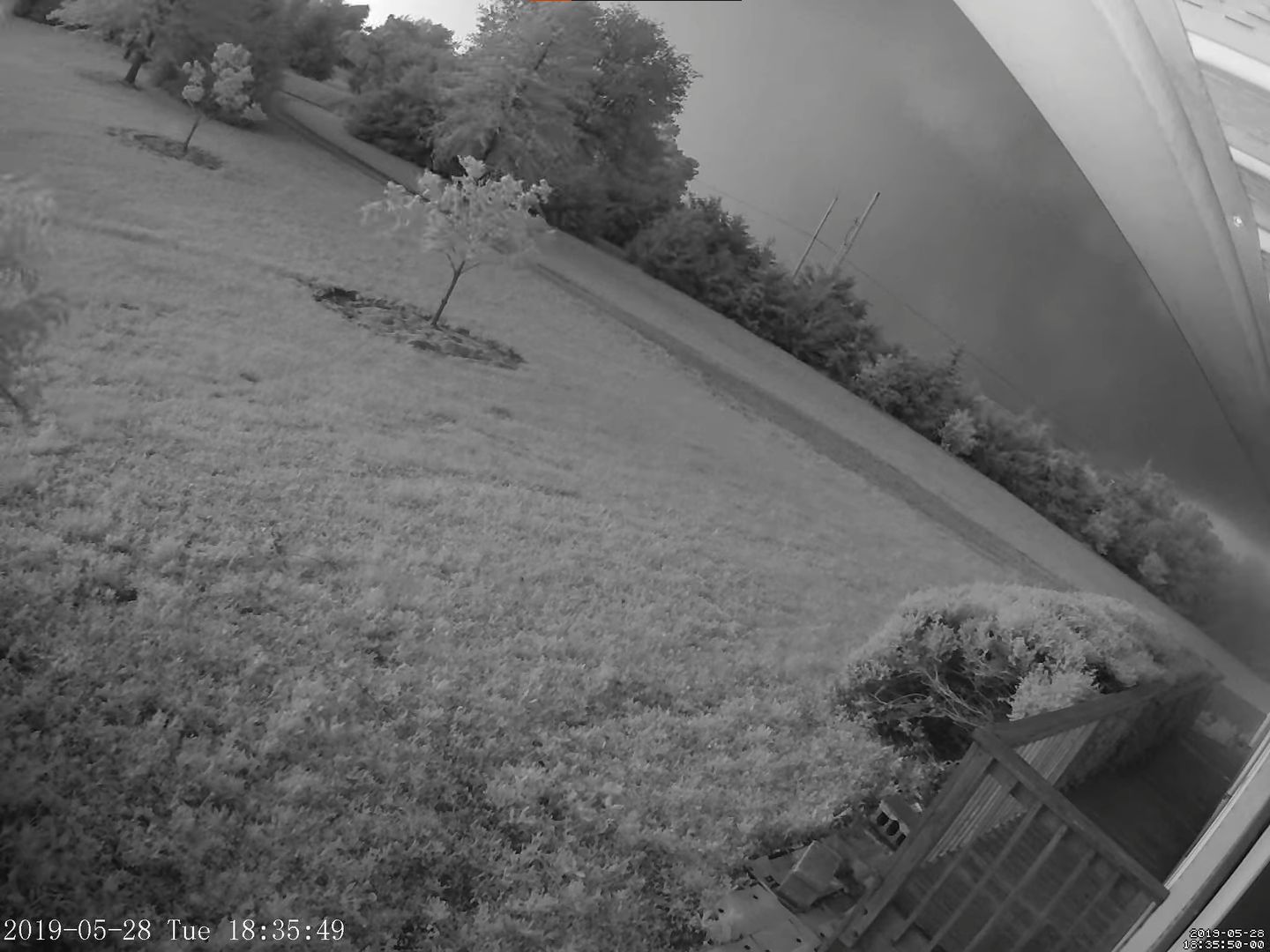
CCTV still of the shrouded, violent tornado

=== Leavenworth County, western Linwood and later demise ===
Upon crossing the Kansas River into Leavenworth County, the National Weather Service WFO in Kansas City, Missouri, followed in part with their Topeka, Kansas counterpart, by issuing another PDS tornado warning for De Soto, Reno, and Linwood at 6:20 PM CDT (23:20 UTC). Approximately fourteen minutes later, the Kansas City office too issued from their forecasting area a tornado emergency for the city's metro area, at 6:34 PM CDT (23:34 UTC). The heavily rainwrapped tornado continued to go along the meandering river at EF2 intensity for around 3.5 mi (5.6 km), before it impacted the western neighborhoods of Linwood.

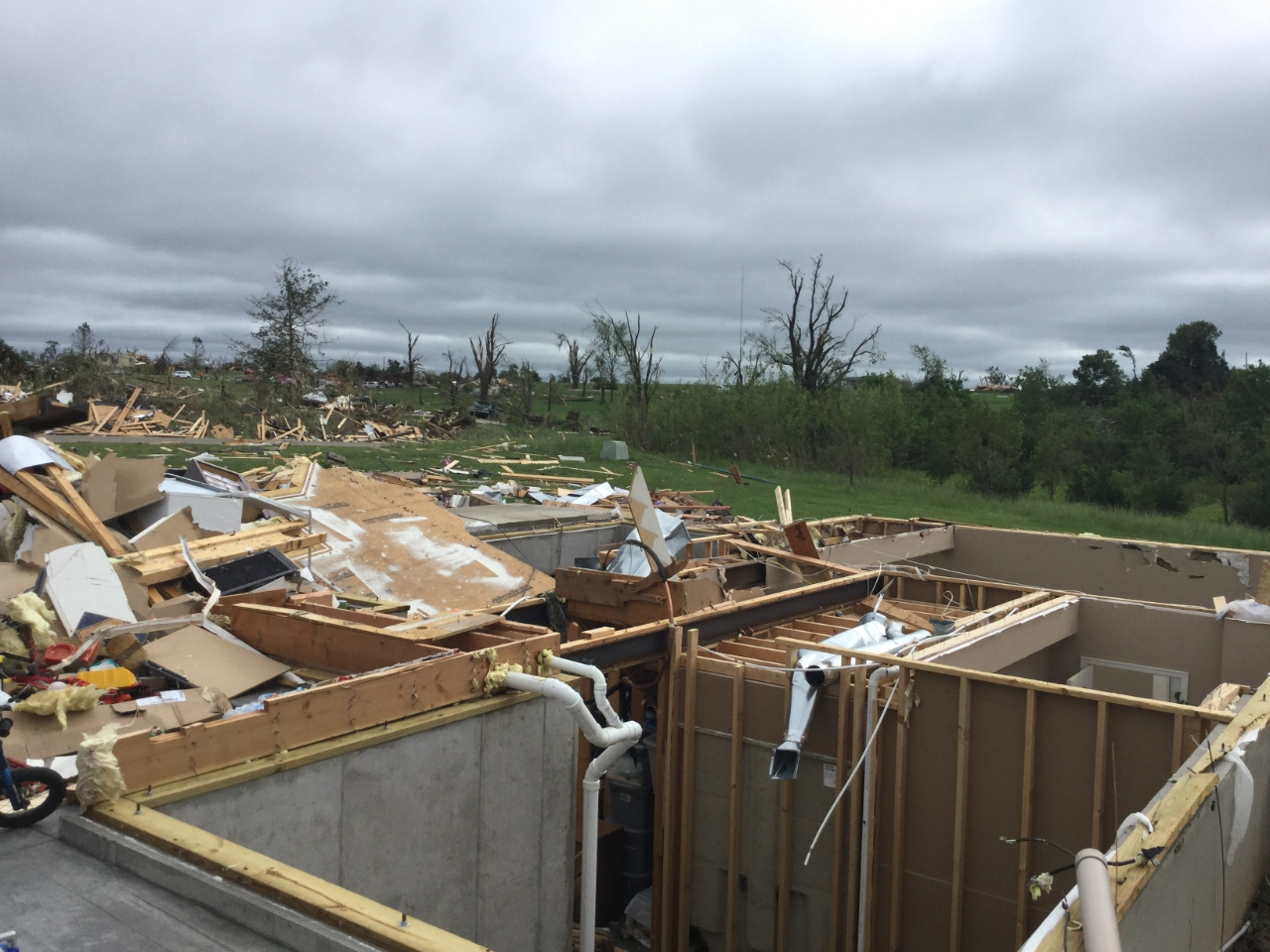
EF4 damage to a house in Linwood

Along Golden Road, the tornado suddenly became violent as it destroyed an anchored home at EF4 strength, with estimated winds of 170 mph (270 km/h). Sill plates that were secured with anchoring bolts to the foundation, were ripped out by the tornado. Thereafter, the storm weakened to EF3 intensity, as it hit two neighboring homes along K-32, heavily destroying them with winds ranging from 140–152 mph (225–245 km/h). North to northeast of town, the tornado continued causing significant EF2 damage as it impacted the Free State Growers wholesaler and leveled it. One employee at the site took shelter underneath a tractor, and survived. Major damage persisted on 198th Street, as a residence was destroyed alongside stubbed trees with approximately 135 mph (217 km/h) winds. The last area where EF2+ damage occurred was along 170th Street, where a house had all of its exterior walls torn down by corresponding 122 mph (196 km/h) winds. For the remainder of its life, the tornado caused EF0–EF1 damage to homes and outbuildings before dissipating west of Bonner Springs, Kansas, at 7:00 PM CDT (00:00 UTC).

After the Linwood tornado dissipated, the supercell responsible for the EF4 tornado crossed from Kansas into Missouri, passing over the northern suburbs of Kansas City. The cell afterwards produced a third significant tornado, rated EF2, that impacted areas in between Kearney and Excelsior Springs, before soon dissipating.

== Aftermath ==
The Linwood event was the first time a violent tornado struck the state of Kansas in over 3 years, when a large and violent EF4 tornado struck Dickinson County on May 25, 2016. Throughout the 2019 season, this was the third and last tornado to be rated that high in the United States. The first of the prior two EF4 tornadoes occurred on March 3, where it struck Lee County, Alabama. The other EF4 tornado happened a day prior to the Kansas storm on May 27, taking place in Montgomery County, Ohio, within the Dayton metropolitan area. Alongside that, the Linwood tornado was also the last violent tornado of the decade to occur in the United States throughout the 2010s. For the Kansas City area alone, the Linwood tornado was the strongest to occur since F4 tornadoes impacted the region in 2003.

=== Damage and casualties ===
==== National Weather Service storm assessments ====
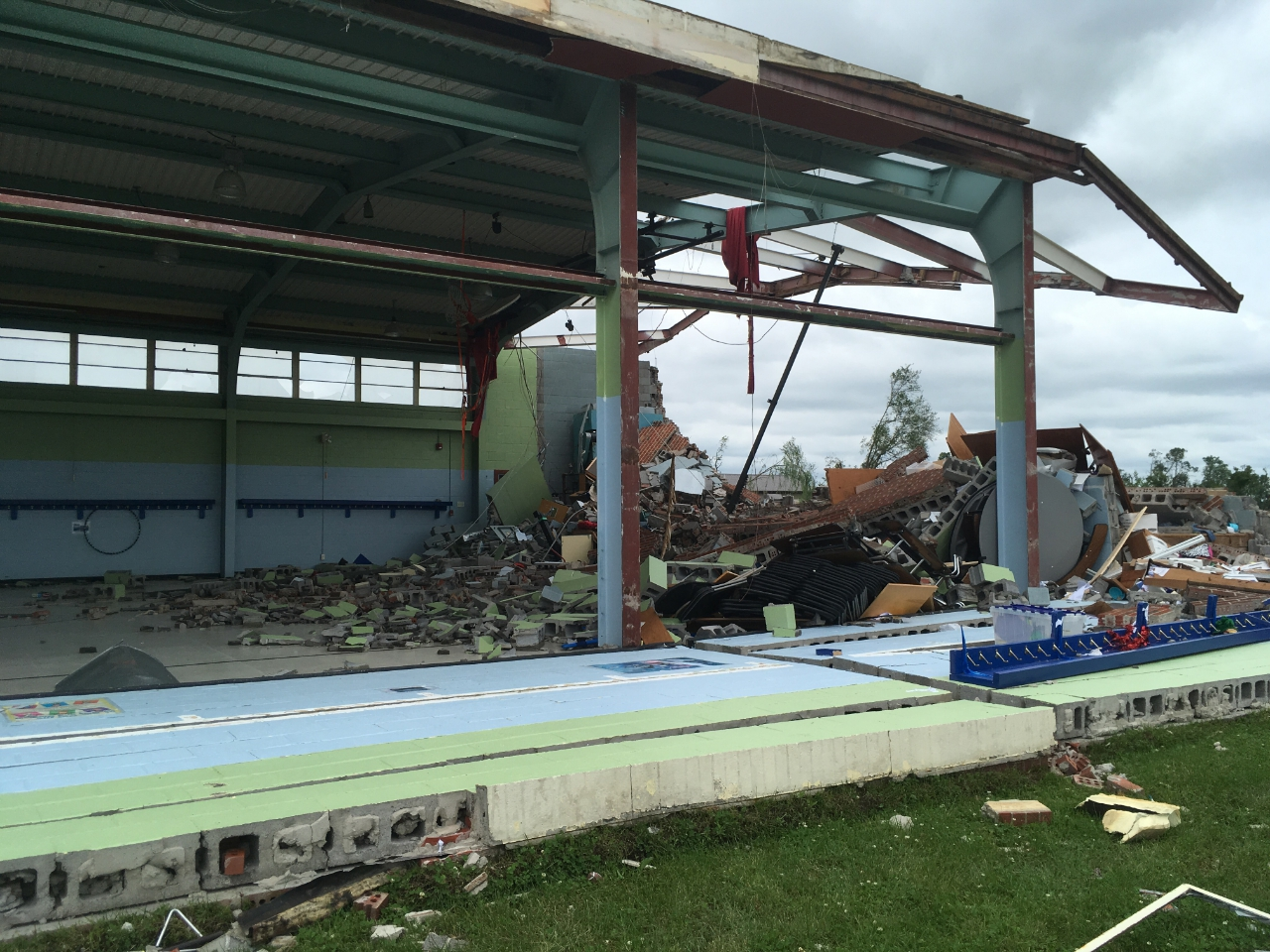
A daycare center that was hit at EF3 intensity, and where multiple people, including children were inside during the tornado

A day after the Linwood tornado occurred, the National Weather Service forecasting office covering the Kansas City area, located in Pleasant Hill, Missouri, released their preliminary results of their damage surveys of the tornado. The tornado was given a rating of low-end EF4 on the Enhanced Fujita scale, with estimated winds of 170 miles per hour (270 km/h) along a path of 31.82 miles (51.21 km). The tornado also was a mile wide or 1,760 yards (1.61 km). A supposed count of 18 people were reportedly injured during the event in this post, and no fatalities occurred with this tornado. Finalized reports for the tornado per the National Centers for Environmental Information (NCEI) kept the wind and width estimates, but shortened the path length by 2.75 miles (4.43 km), down to 29.07 miles (46.78 km). The tornado also injured a total of 4 people, compared to the preliminary estimate of 18.

==== Regional impact ====
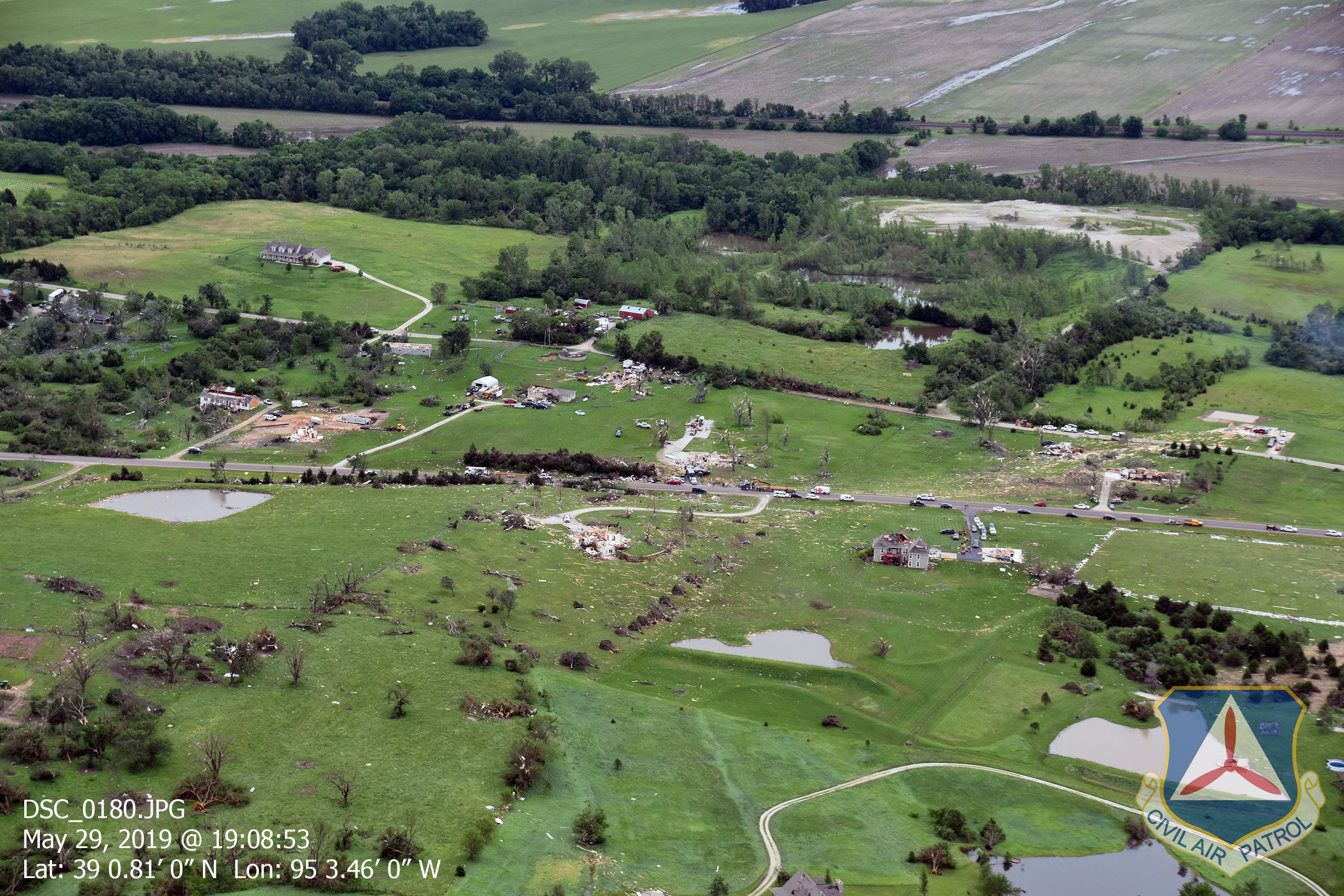
Aerial view of the Linwood area a day after the tornado

Kansas City International Airport was closed for a brief period as debris was littered 47 miles (76 km) after the tornado, causing flights to be delayed. More than 13,000 customers were left without power after the storms passed. In Douglas County, monetary estimates from the tornado were up to US$22 million. Around 160 buildings, including homes and other structures, were searched through by emergency personnel, with an estimated 40 of the searched structures sustaining heavy damage. 25 of them were considered moderately impacted. In Leavenworth County, the tornado caused an estimated US$26 million in damages. 50 structures alongside one business were damaged, with 19 of them destroyed. Linwood and the surrounding areas suffered the worst of the destruction during the event.

=== Recovery process ===
==== Federal efforts ====
During the spring and early summer months of 2019, Kansas was impacted by severe storms, which were responsible for damaging straight-line winds and tornadoes. Flooding, alongside mudslides and landslides were also brought up in parts of the state, as part of the storms that went across the area. The Federal Emergency Management Agency (FEMA), under the first presidency of Donald Trump, issued a disaster declaration (FEMA-4449-DR) for the state on June 20, noted in a six-month recovery report that US$861,037.79 in Public Assistance funds were provided for the state's various projects. US$581,000 was provided for state-wide projects, while the remainder was given to Jefferson County. Approximately 53 counties throughout Kansas, including Leavenworth County were covered in the federal disaster declaration, with it especially due to the EF4 tornado on May 28.

==== Local feats ====
In Douglas County, the local emergency management opened up a so-called "volunteer reception center", for individuals that can register themselves to help and give relief to the victims affected by the tornadoes. People from outside of Douglas County, and even outside of Kansas came in to support those in need. On May 29–30, residents of Basehor dropped off supplies and donations for the impacted victims at the campus of Basehor-Linwood High School. Ashley Razak, the school district's communications coordinator, stated that donations filled in some 16 truck beds for the survivors in Linwood. Student groups at Basehor-Linwood High School, such as the football and volleyball teams, offered to volunteer during the cleanup efforts following the tornado. At the impacted areas, a mobile medical unit was set up at Linwood Elementary School.

==== Months and years later ====
After the storm, many residents of Linwood were surprised at how the city still was left standing. The recovery process was for some of the townspeople challenging. One family, the Duffins, decided to move away from their home in Linwood, to nearby Lawrence. They were one of only a handful of people who chose to leave the town, after losing everything due to the tornado. Mayor Brian Christensen, was happy for appearance of volunteers that pitched in to help clean up the debris. Despite the positivity, there was doubt at first if Linwood would be given the aid needed from FEMA, and the fact that the tornado caused major economic impacts on the town. “All we have is a gas station and a cabinet shop," he spoke in a KCUR-FM report months later. Christensen also cited that "There is no silver lining for Linwood.”. The mayor assumed that the lack of anything besides the aforementioned gas station and cabinet shop, it would make builders and repairmen disinterested with building projects, as he compared his small city to disaster sites that were successful. Mark Illausky, the owner of the Free State Growers greenhouse business in Linwood, stated that while some days it felt so quick in the reconstruction, others felt like there was still a long road ahead. The company stood in the community since the 1970s, with Illausky having bought it a decade before the 2019 storm. Regardless of the destruction and financial losses, the business owner stood calm and confident, with managing plans he did with 35 of his workers to get Free State Growers back up again. “Next year, all of this is going to be done and behind us and hopefully we won’t be doing any construction and we’ll just be growing plants,” stated Illausky to KSHB-TV during an interview a year after. The greenhouse owner expected that for next year, the business would stick to growing and selling its plant-based products to other commercial stores such as grocery and hardware stores, rather than needing additional rebuilding efforts. An employee who was working at the time and took shelter when the tornado struck, continued to work at the company alongside with the tractor being used they sheltered underneath. After five years, Linwood largely rebuilt its damaged structures. Mayor Christensen mentioned that the old elementary school was converted into a tornado shelter.

In a 2021 report through the American Meteorological Society's 101st Annual Meeting, the 2019 EF4 tornado, alongside the initial EF2 tornado merger near Overbrook, were considered a nightmare scenario according to two NWS Topeka meteorologists. One of the factors was that half of the meteorologists working for the nearby WFO lived in Lawrence, causing much stress among the workers stationed there. The other reason was that EF4 tornado, and its EF2 predecessor, were extremely rainwrapped due to the nature of the parent supercell thunderstorm, which was a high-precipitation kind. This made warning operations and storm spotting more difficult to process, alongside post-analyses. The 2019 event sparked much interest in the meteorological world. Future examinations was to be done in detail through ground and aerial survey data, but also radar in the base and dual-polarization forms.

== University of Kansas field engineering studies ==
=== House-to-house examinations ===
Three days after the tornado on May 31, 2019, structural engineers from the University of Kansas (KU), funded by the National Science Foundation's Structural Extreme Events Reconnaissance Network (StEER), conducted 271 door-to-door assessments of homes within a three-day timespan. The engineers discovered that many of the properties impacted by the tornado along its track, had various structural fail points that contributed to their destruction. Structures either lacked proper connections between the roof and walls, wall sheathing or sufficient anchoring to prevent devastating building failures. Some homes were reportedly glued to the foundation, which did not provide protection against the tornado's uplift and lateral forces. This entire documentation of the structural assessments was recorded by KU engineer Elaina Sutley, with her interview featured on the PBS Terra show Weathered.

Orthomosaic and Digital Surface Model (DSM) used on UAV images in southeastern Lawrence

=== Technological damage surveying ===
In December 2019, KU engineers and experts presented their works at the American Geophysical Union's 2019 Fall Meeting, in San Francisco, California. Alongside their exhibitions, they published a research paper onto the SAO/NASA Astrophysics Data System, a digital library portal that is part of Harvard University in Cambridge, Massachusetts. After the Linwood tornado event, a quick post-disaster team of engineers was dispatched and at the scene used technological methods in the aftermath, such as unmanned aerial vehicles (UAVs) for aerial surveys, alongside traditional ground-based human assessments. It is thought that UAVs have extra advantages than human-based surveyors, due to more efficient usages and costs. An example is that a UAV, with a mounted camera, is able to take ground to roof damage photos in a more timely method. However, such systems are limited by the lack of actionable analytics that immediate damage surveyors at a damage scene can offer. With the support from 3D-based mapping programs, and the rise of artificial intelligence, a new framework for post-tornado assessments is very capable to become a training ground that will benefit most first responders. Structural engineers already began constructing and validating these frameworks based on the aftermath of the 2019 tornado.

=== Post-May 2019 field research ===
A quad-photo collage showing ongoing home repairs

In a research field study published by analysts from KU and the National Academies of Sciences, Engineering, and Medicine (NASEM), on the ResearchGate platform, engineers discovered notable instances during the recovery process in the wake and the months after the Linwood tornado. After completing their 271 door-to-door assessments in late-May 2019, from November to December that same year, StEER researchers reported that during the post six-month recovery process, some 44% of the assessed homes that were examined by KU engineers had completed repairs, with 64% of the residencies being occupied. Other findings during the mid to late-2019 period were that some 73% of the tenants had no power for more than one day and nearly 30% missed a week of work. Another instance was that 96% of respondents in the paper in this time frame had home insurance, but only 78% received a payout with an average of 28 days for the first payment. Despite support from FEMA, no individual assistance was recorded to take place at any surveyed household. Four homes received loans for repairs from the U.S. Small Business Administration, which ultimately took an average amount of 140 days while in comparison financial aid from non-governmental organizations (NGOs) took a more faster approach, at 39 days with cleanup and family assistance taking around an amount of 10 days. A dozen households were financially helped out by NGOs, with 47 and 15 others receiving cleanup and family assistance. The post-six month recovery also noted on other findings, such as risk perception, sheltering behavior, and building code perceptions.

Listed below are reports from tenants of residential building damage and loss of utilities during the assessments.

	Yes (%)	No (%)	Don't Know (%)	Not Applicable (%)	Average hours without service
Damage to home	99 (86.8)	15 (13.2)	0	-	-
Lost electric power	109 (95.6)	4 (3.5)	0	0	104
Lost water	23 (20.2)	90 (78.9)	0	0	275
Lost wastewater/sewer	10 (8.8)	102 (89.5)	1 (0.9)	0	606
Lost natural gas	24 (21.1)	74 (64.9)	3 (2.6)	12 (10.8)	634
Lost cell phone services	32 (28.1)	77 (67.5)	4 (3.5)	0	50
Lost landline phone service	22 (19.3)	15 (13.2)	10 (8.8)	66 (57.9)	358
Lose internet	79 (69.3)	16 (14.0)	11 (9.6)	7 (6.1)	215

=== Resolution 2025-37 ===
From 2019 until late 2025, Leavenworth County, Kansas, unlike its county seat Leavenworth, had not adopted any sort of modern building codes, before and in the years since the tornado. Elaina Sutley mentioned the county's absence of regulations in unincorporated areas, during her appearance on Weathered in 2021. On November 12, 2025 the county adopted, and modified the International Code Council's 2012 International Residential Code (IRC). The passage of the IRC was under Resolution 2025-37, which applied only for structures built after Leavenworth County ratified the regulation.

== Team Dominator meteorological research ==
=== SRV Dominator rocket deployment ===
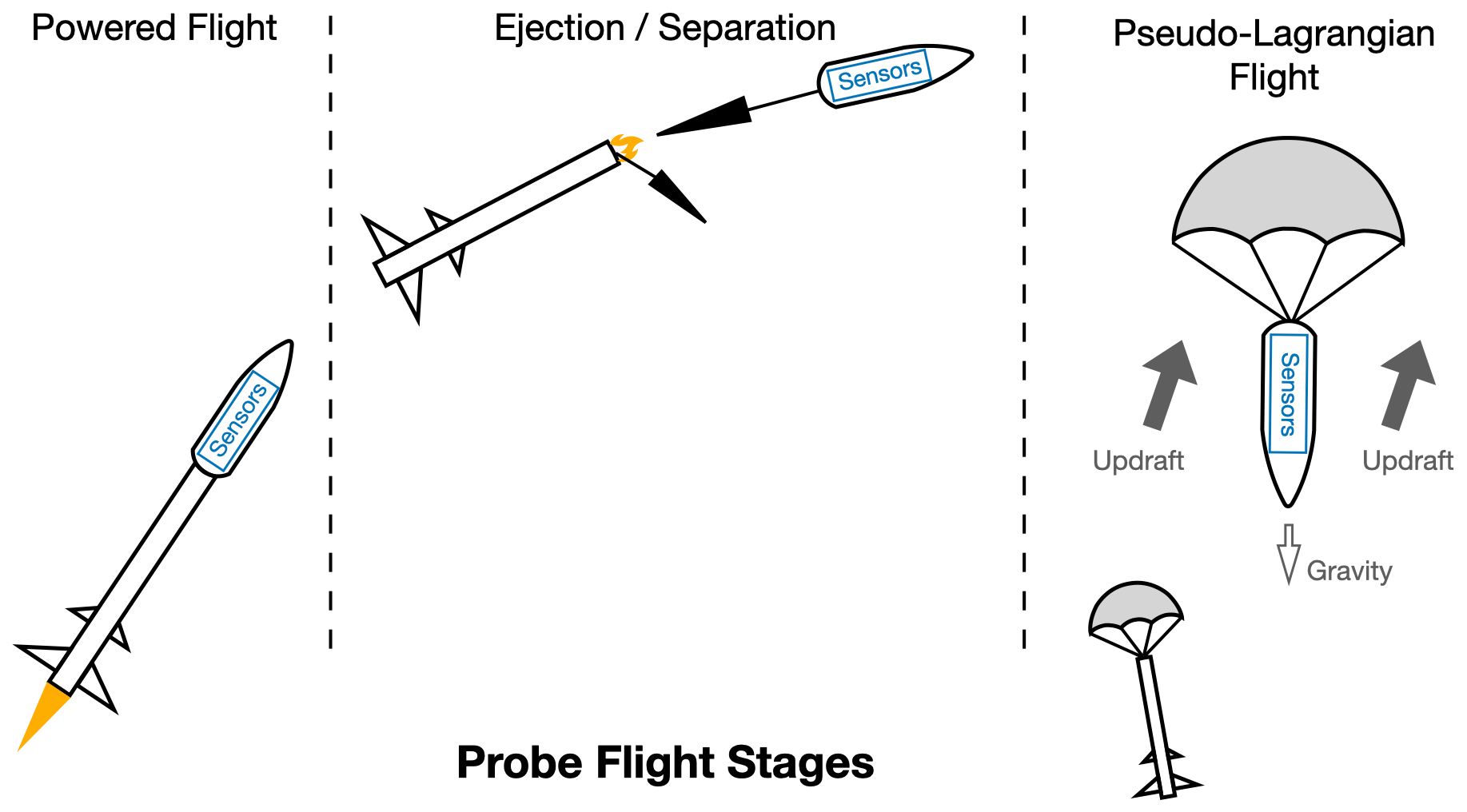
An illustration of the three stages of flight the rocket probe went through during its rotations into the storm

Next-Generation weather radar data of storm-scale features (Note: Storm-scale features in this image are the FFD boundary, RFD gust front, inflow zone, and low-level mesocyclone.)

==== Launching of Dorothy ====
As the tornado was south of the city of Lawrence, Reed Timmer and Team Dominator launched a custom-built meteorological probe attached to a miniature rocket, which was designed by Canadian engineer Mark Simpson, from their Dominator 3 storm research vehicle at 6:17:33 PM CDT (23:17:33 UTC). The rocket was launched into the tornado's inflow region and lofted up to 34,000 feet (10,000 m) within the tornadic circulation and sampled the core flow.

==== Probing the storm ====
Equipment used in the 2019 tornado

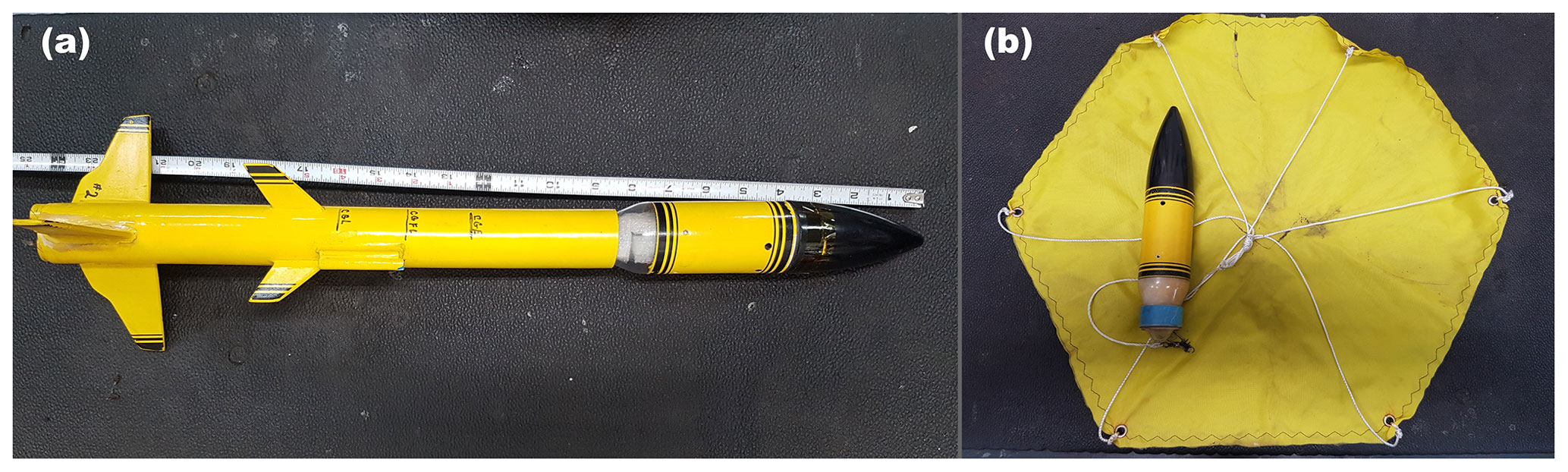
The custom-built "Dorothy" rocket and "Bill Paxton" sensor together (a) alongside the sensor with its parachute (b) (Note: Both instruments referred to the 1996 movie Twister. Dorothy referenced the eponymous probe from the movie, while the Bill Paxton sensor was a reference made in honor to actor Bill Paxton, who played as the role of Dr. Bill Harding.)

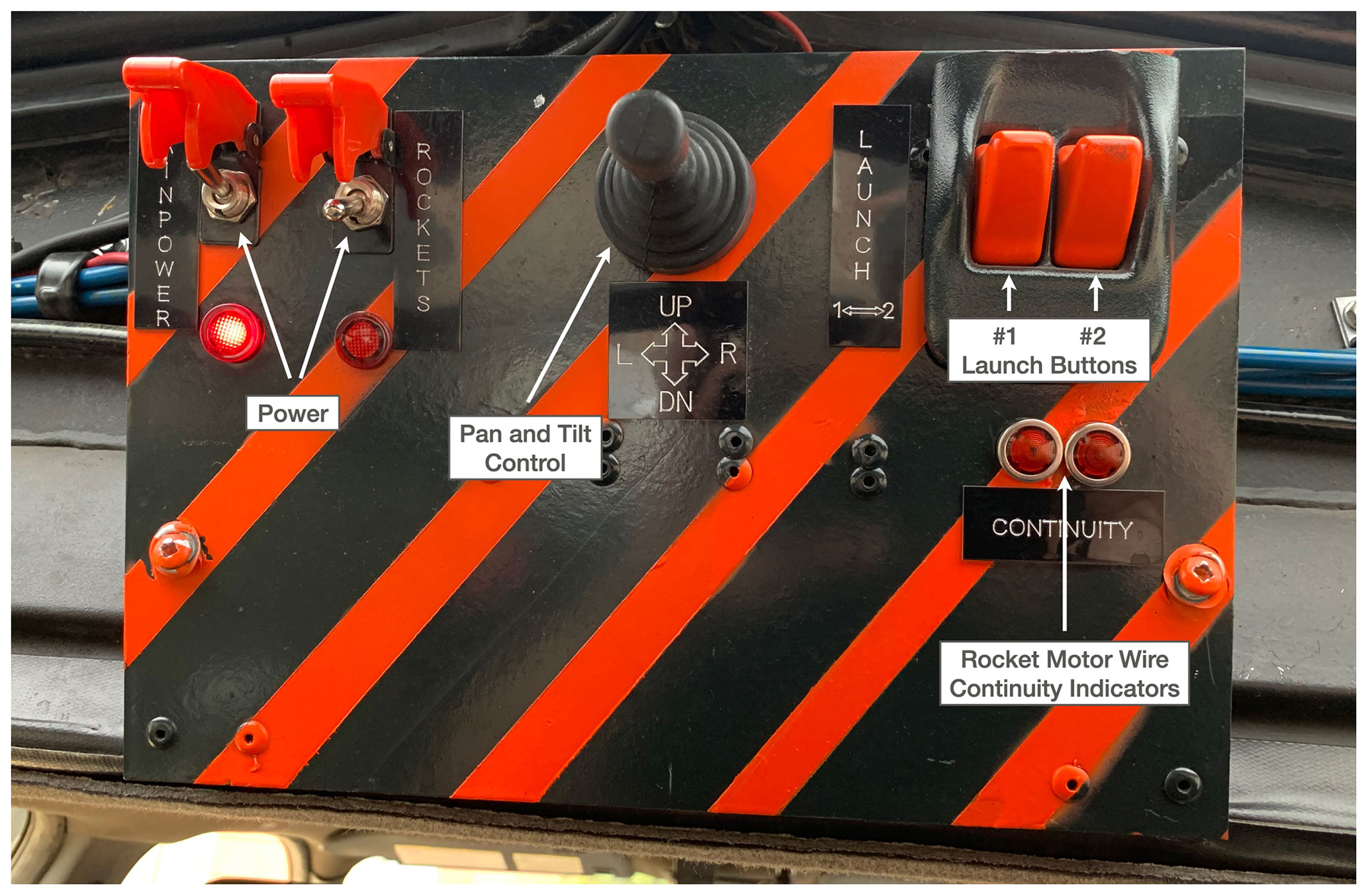
Dominator 3 Storm Research Vehicle (SRV) control panel

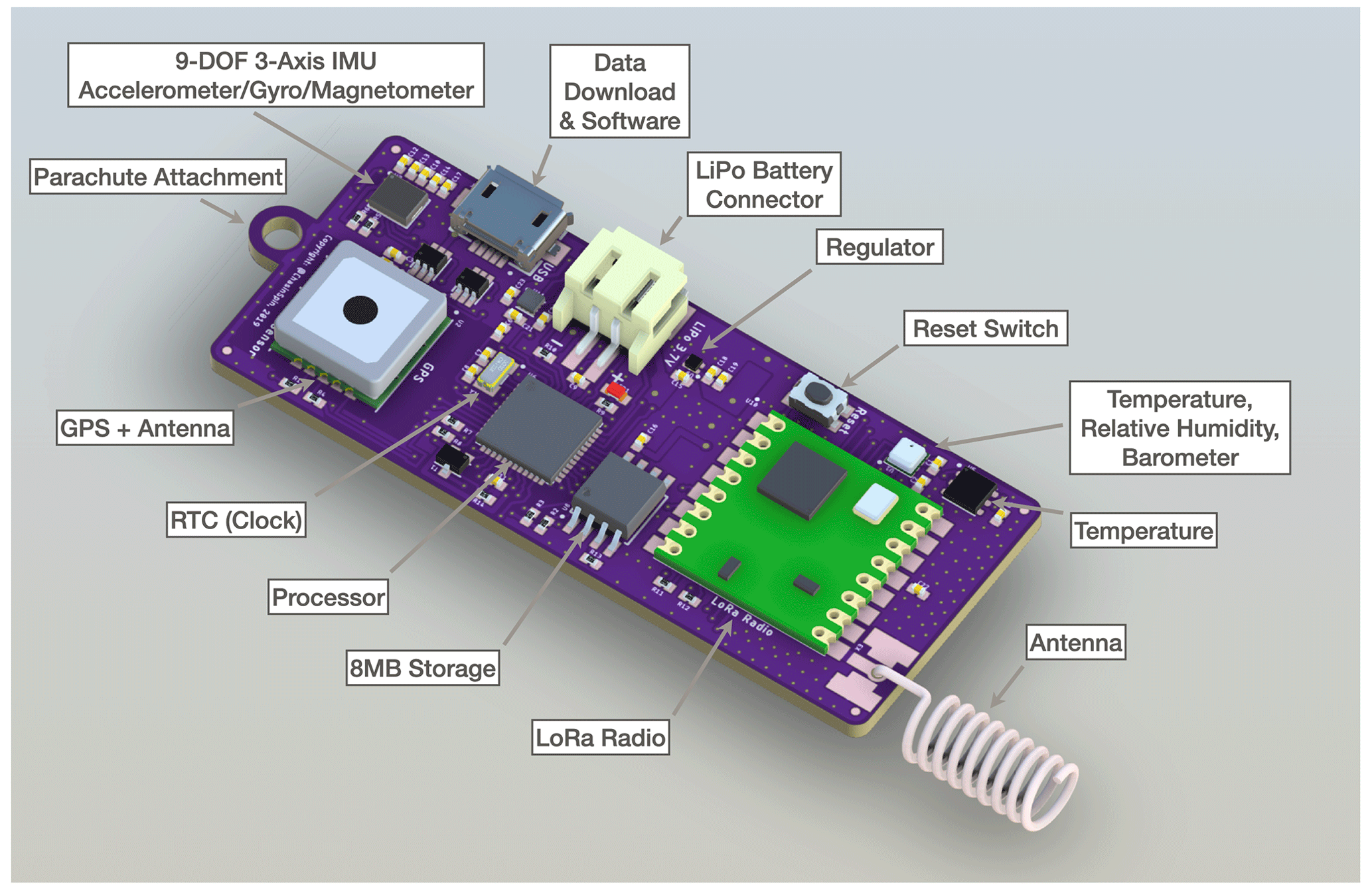
3D-model of the probe's electronic components and sensors

At 7.9 seconds after its launch, one hertz data showed live data that the probe's parachute deployed at 437 metres (1,434 ft) above ground level (AGL), and entered the northwestern side of the then ongoing wedge tornado. The research group continued on US 59 to maintain communication with the probe, until connection was lost at 6:25:09 PM CDT (23:05:09 UTC) as the probe entered the tropopause at a distance of 10.4 kilometres (6.5 mi), and at an altitude of 10,680 metres (35,040 ft) above sea level (ASL), with a maximum height of 11,914 metres (39,088 ft) ASL as the probe entered the upper troposphere before descending. The probe was recovered a day later on the grounds of a church within the city of Leavenworth, after having traveled a distance of 51.1 kilometres (31.8 mi) to the northeast throughout its entire pseudo-Lagrangian flight.

=== Recorded data and results ===
3D-GPS flight trajectory of Dorothy Rocket data 2024 data from the rocket during its rotations in the tornado Detailed graph showing rocket probe position for the flight with 3D GPS speed (a) and pressure perturbation (b)

Throughout its stay within the circulation of the large EF4 tornado, the probe recorded a maximum pressure deficit of -113.5 hPa (millibar) at 475 metres (1,558 ft) ASL, which dropped to less than -20 hPa by a height of 3,760 metres (12,340 ft) ASL in the storm's mesocyclone. Alongside that, the probe caught instantaneous winds of 85.1 metres per second (306 km/h; 190 mph) during the first rotation, at 858 metres (2,815 ft) ASL. Measurements of the storm's updraft were also taken in account, where a 1-second gust of 65 metres per second (230 km/h; 150 mph) was documented at an altitude of 2,171.3 metres (7,124 ft) ASL. Temperature, relative humidity, GPS, acceleration, gyroscope, and magnetometer sensor data were all recorded at real-time as the probe was inflight for roughly 30 minutes in total.

Team Dominator was the first ever storm chasing, and scientific research team to deploy the usage of a meteorological rocket probe into a tornado, to collect data that was not accessible before.

=== New method of intensity measurements ===
Tornadoes as a phenomenon usually destroy any type of measuring instruments, due to their extreme winds and large amount of lofted debris, that can act as high-speed, and potentially deadly projectiles. This new way of direct wind measurements unlocks capabilities to understand tornado intensity that was never recorded before, aside from usual proxies such as damage assessments.

== See also ==
- Tornadoes of 2019
- List of F4, EF4, and IF4 tornadoes
  - List of F4 and EF4 tornadoes (2010–2019)
- List of North American tornadoes and tornado outbreaks
- Tornado intensity
- History of tornado research
- 2024 Elkhorn tornado – A large EF4 tornado that impacted metropolitan areas in Nebraska and Iowa
- 2011 St. Louis tornado – Another rainwrapped EF4 tornado that struck metropolitan areas in Missouri and Illinois
- 2010 Yazoo City tornado – Another large and heavily rainwrapped EF4 wedge tornado that tore across rural Louisiana and Mississippi, which was the first violent U.S. tornado of the decade
