= List of breweries in Kansas =

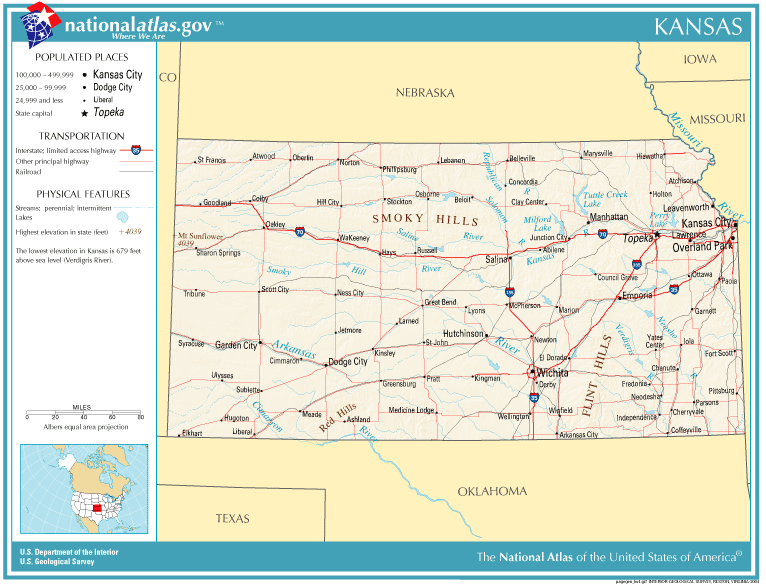
Kansas ranks 28th nationally in craft breweries per capita.

Breweries in Kansas produce a wide range of beers in different styles that are marketed locally and regionally. Brewing companies vary widely in the volume and variety of beer produced, from small nanobreweries to microbreweries to massive multinational conglomerate macrobreweries.

In 2012, Kansas's 21 breweries and brewpubs employed 70 people directly, and more than 10,000 others in related jobs such as wholesaling and retailing. Including people directly employed in brewing, as well as those who supply Kansas' breweries with everything from ingredients to machinery, the total business and personal tax revenue generated by Kansas' breweries and related industries was more than $190 million. Consumer purchases of Kansas' brewery products generated more than $90 million in additional tax revenue. By 2023, according to the Brewers Association, Kansas ranked 34th in the number of craft breweries per capita with 77 and 34th in the United States for overall number of breweries statewide.

For context, at the end of 2013 there were 2,822 breweries in the United States, including 2,768 craft breweries subdivided into 1,237 brewpubs, 1,412 microbreweries and 119 regional craft breweries. In that same year, according to the Beer Institute, the brewing industry employed around 43,000 Americans in brewing and distribution and had a combined economic impact of more than $246 billion.

== Open breweries ==
The following is a list of breweries and microbreweries. The largest brewery in Kansas is Free State Brewing Company in Lawrence

Brewery	Location
15-24 Brew House	Clay Center
23rd Street Brewery	Lawrence
785 Beer Company	Topeka
Aggieville Brewing Company	Manhattan
Black Stag Brewery	Lawrence
Blind Tiger Brewery	Topeka
Blue Skye Brewery & Eats	Salina
Brew Lab Brewery + Kitchen	Overland Park
Center Pivot Restaurant & Brewery	Colby
Central Standard Brewing	Wichita
Defiance Brewing Company	Hays
Dodge City Brewing	Dodge City
Drop the H Brewing Company	Pittsburg
Dry Lake Brewing	Great Bend
ExBEERiment Brewing	Gardner
The Farm & The Odd Fellows	Minneapolis
Fields & Ivy Brewery	Lawrence
Flat Mountain Brewhouse	Garden City
FlappyDuck Brewery	Mulvane
Force of Nature Brewing	De Soto
Free State Brewing Company	Lawrence
Gella's Diner & Lb. Brewing Company	Hays
Hank Is Wiser Brewery	Cheney
Happy Basset Brewing Company	Topeka
Hidden Trail Brewing	Garden City
Hopping Gnome Brewery	Wichita
Indy Brew Works	Independence
Iron Rail Brewing	Topeka
Irrigation Ales	Courtland
Jolly Fox Brewery	Pittsburg
Kansas Territory Brewing Company	Washington
Ladybird Brewing	Winfield
Lawrence Beer Company	Lawrence
The Leprechaun's Lab	Wichita
Limitless Brewing	Lenexa
Manhattan Brewing Company	Manhattan
Nortons Brewing Company	Wichita
Not Lost Brewing Company	Ottawa
Outfield Beer Company	Bonner Springs
Oz Brewing	Phillipsburg
Pathlight Brewing	Shawnee
Radius Brewing Company	Emporia
Range 23 Brewing	Kansas City
Red Crow Brewing Company	Olathe
River City Brewing Company	Wichita
Riverbank Brewing	Council Grove
Rockcreek Brewing Company	Mission
Salt City Brewing Company	Hutchinson
Sandhills Brewing	Hutchinson & Mission
Servaes Brewing Company	Shawnee
Tall Trellis Brew Co.	Olathe
Third Place Brewing	Wichita
Three Rings Brewery	McPherson
Transport Brewery	Shawnee
Union Works Brewing Company	Humboldt
Walnut River Brewing Company	El Dorado
Wichita Brewing Company	Wichita
Willcott Brewing Company	Leavenworth
Yankee Tank Brewing Company	Lawrence

- BJ's Restaurant & Brewery (Huntington Beach, California-based) has one location in Wichita.
- Gordon Biersch Brewing Company (Palo Alto, California-based) has one location in Leawood.
- Granite City Food and Brewery (St. Cloud, Minnesota-based) has two locations in Kansas City and Olathe.

== Former breweries ==
The following is a list of breweries and microbreweries that have closed or have ceased brewing; this list is for tracking former locations.

Brewery	Location
Aero Plains Brewing	Wichita
Beaver Brewery @ Mo's Place	Beaver
Boiler Room Brewhaus	Fort Scott
Fly Boy Brewery & Eats	Sylvan Grove
Little Apple Brewing Company	Manhattan
Lost Evenings Brewing Company	Lenexa
Norsemen Brewing Company	Topeka
Tallgrass Brewing Company	Manhattan

== See also ==
- Beer in the United States
- List of breweries in the United States
- List of microbreweries
- List of wineries in Kansas
