= Tallgrass =

Tallgrass most frequently refers to the native North American grasslands Tallgrass prairie.

Tallgrass may also refer to:

== Companies ==
- Tallgrass Beef Company, Kansas-based beef company
- Tallgrass Brewing Company, Kansas's largest brewery based in Manhattan, KS
- Tallgrass Energy Partners, an oil company
- Tallgrass Technologies Corporation, acquired by Exabyte in 1993, sold computer tape backup systems

== Locations ==
- Tallgrass Prairie National Preserve, a United States National Preserve located in the Flint Hills region of Kansas
- Tallgrass Prairie Preserve, owned and managed by The Nature Conservancy in Osage County, Oklahoma
- Midewin National Tallgrass Prairie, operated by the United States Forest Service near Elwood, Illinois
- Tallgrass Aspen Parkland, a Conservation area located in southeastern Manitoba /northwestern Minnesota
- Northern Tallgrass Prairie National Wildlife Refuge, a refuge in northern Minnesota and Iowa

== Other uses ==
- Tallgrass (band), an American music trio
- Tallgrass Film Festival, annual film festival held in Wichita, Kansas
