= List of wineries in Kansas =

The following is a list of wineries in the state of Kansas. Kansas wine refers to wine made from grapes grown in the U.S. state of Kansas. In the nineteenth century Kansas was a significant grape-growing state. Its latitude, long, sunny growing season and soils ranging from limestone-laced to sandy, can provide favorable conditions for growing grapes if the suitable varieties are planted.

== Table ==
Name	Location	Established
Aubrey Vineyards	Overland Park	2010
BlueJacket Crossing Vineyard & Winery	Eudora	2002
Bourgmont Winery	Bucyrus	2016
Crooked Post Winery	Ozawkie	2014
Davenport Orchards & Winery	Eudora	1997
Empty Nester's Winery	Lecompton	
Glaciers Edge Winery & Vineyard	Wakarusa	
Grace Hill Winery	Whitewater	
Fossil Springs Winery	Paola	2017
Holy-Field Vineyard & Winery	Basehor	1994
Irvine's Just Beyond Paradise Winery	Lawrence	2020
KC Wine Co.	Olathe	
Liquid Art Winery and Estate	Manhattan	2014
Prairie Fire Winery	Paxico	2008
Rosewood Winery	Great Bend	
Rowe Ridge Vineyard & Winery	Kansas City	2005
Somerset Ridge Vineyard & Winery	Paola	2001
White Tail Winery	Edgerton	2003
Wyldewood Cellars Winery	Paxico & Peck	1994
Zydeco Meadery	Wamego	2021
Inland Ocean Vineyards	Hutchinson	2018

== Former wineries ==
The following is a list of wineries that have closed; this list is for tracking former locations.

Winery	Location	Established
Doniphan Vineyards	Doniphan	1857
Jenny Dawn Cellars	Wichita	2019
Black Labs Craft Meadery	Olathe	2018

== See also ==
- Kansas wine
- List of breweries in Kansas
