= Eric Scott Jr. =

American football player (born 1999)

Profile
- Position: Cornerback

Personal information
- Born: August 7, 1998 (age 28); Basehor, Kansas, U.S.
- Listed height: 6 ft 1 in (1.85 m)
- Listed weight: 197 lb (89 kg)

Career information
- High school: Basehor-Linwood
- College: Illinois State (2017–2018); Butler CC (2019); Southern Miss (2020–2022)
- NFL draft: 2023: 6th round, 178th overall pick

Career history
- Dallas Cowboys (2023); Kansas City Chiefs (2024–2025)*; Detroit Lions (2026)*
- * Offseason or practice squad member only
- Stats at Pro Football Reference

Eric Scott Jr. (born August 7, 1998) is an American professional football cornerback. He played college football for the Southern Miss Golden Eagles.

== Early life and college ==
Scott attended Basehor-Linwood High School. In his high school career, he appeared in 33 games, while tallying 126 tackles (5 for loss), 9 interceptions and 13 passes defensed.

He accepted a football scholarship from Illinois State University. As a redshirt freshman, he played in 4 games as a backup.

Scott transferred to Butler Community College in 2019. As a sophomore, he appeared in 11 games, making 11 tackles and 2 interceptions.

He transferred to the University of Southern Mississippi in 2020. As a junior, he appeared in 9 games (5 starts), collecting 31 tackles, one interception and five passes defensed. He had 8 tackles against Louisiana Tech University. He made 7 tackles against Tulane University.

As a senior in 2021, he appeared in all 12 games (11 starts) posting 20 tackles, 2 interceptions and 2 fumble recoveries. He had 3 tackles against Troy University and the University of Texas at El Paso.

As a super senior in 2022, he appeared in 12 games, compiling 27 tackles (2 for loss) and 7 passes defended. He also had 2 interceptions, both returned for touchdowns.

== Professional career ==
Pre-draft measurables
Height	Weight	Arm length	Hand span	40-yard dash	Vertical jump	Broad jump	Bench press
6 ft 0 3/4 in (1.85 m)	197 lb (89 kg)	32 1/4 in (0.82 m)	9 1/2 in (0.24 m)	4.71 s	39.5 in (1.00 m)	11 ft 1 in (3.38 m)	16 reps

=== Dallas Cowboys ===
Scott was selected by the Dallas Cowboys in the sixth round (178th overall) of the 2023 NFL draft. The Cowboys traded a fifth-round selection in the 2024 NFL draft (#159-Hunter Nourzad) to the Kansas City Chiefs, in exchange for the selection which they used to draft Scott. As a rookie, he was declared inactive in every game of the season and never saw the field.

In 2024, he was passed on the depth chart by rookie Caelen Carson and third-year player Andrew Booth Jr. during training camp. He was waived by the Cowboys on August 26, 2024.

=== Kansas City Chiefs ===
Scott was claimed off of waivers by the Kansas City Chiefs on August 28, 2024. He was waived two days later and re-signed to their practice squad on September 3. Scott signed a reserve/future contract with Kansas City on February 11, 2025. On August 1, Scott was waived by the Chiefs with an injury designation.

=== Detroit Lions ===
On August 27, 2026, Scott was signed by the Detroit Lions. On August 30, he was waived by the Lions as a part of final roster cuts.
