= Kansas wine =

Wine from Kansas

Kansas
- Wine region
- Official name: State of Kansas
- Type: U.S. state
- Year established: 1861
- Country: United States
- Total area: 82,277 square miles (213,096 km^{2})
- Size of planted vineyards: 250 acres (101 ha)
- Grapes produced: Aurore, Cabernet Franc, Cabernet Sauvignon, Catawba, Chambourcin, Chancellor, Chardonel, Chardonnay, Concord, Gewürztraminer, Leon Millot, Marechal Foch, Melody, Niagara, Norton, Seyval blanc, St. Vincent, Traminette, Vidal blanc, Vignoles
- No. of wineries: 23

Kansas wine refers to wine made from grapes grown in the U.S. state of Kansas. In the nineteenth century Kansas was a significant grape-growing state. Its latitude, long, sunny growing season and soils ranging from limestone-laced to sandy, can provide favorable conditions for growing grapes if the suitable varieties are planted.

== History ==
In the early to mid-nineteenth century, German immigrants established extensive plantings of grapes in neighboring Missouri along the Missouri River, developing a thriving grape and wine culture that spread west into Eastern Kansas. By the 1870s, Missouri and Kansas constituted one of the largest grape growing and winemaking regions in the U.S., with wineries established in Kansas as far west as Russell and as far east as Paola.

However, the state was also home to Carrie Nation and the early temperance movement. Kansas was the first state in the union to pass statewide prohibition in 1881.

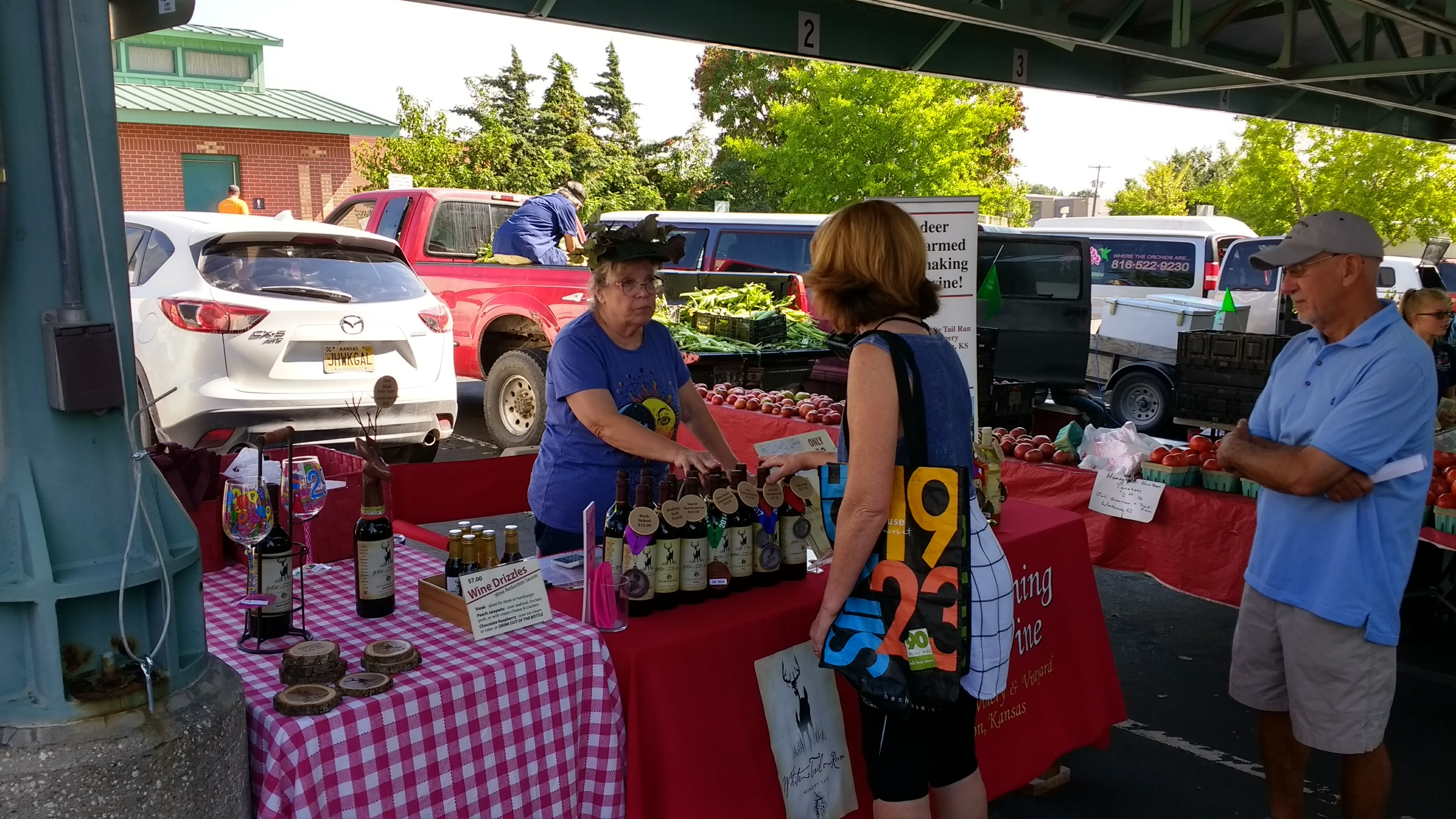
A booth for the White Tail Run Winery at a farmers' market in Overland Park, Kansas.

Vineyard owners did not give up their grapes easily however. As late as 1900, twenty years after prohibition in Kansas, “The Grape in Kansas” published by the state horticultural society documented thousands of acres still existing in Kansas, with detailed statistics regarding cultivars planted, growing techniques and annual yields. It was common knowledge, however, that most of the grapes produced were either used for bootleg winemaking in Kansas or sold across the state line to the thriving wine industry in Missouri.

With the advent of national prohibition in 1920, the grape and wine industry in Kansas and Missouri was destroyed. Even after the repeal of prohibition, strong liquor laws in Kansas prevented the reemergence of the industry until the Kansas Farm Winery Statute was passed in 1985.

== Wine industry today ==
As of 2010, there were 23 licensed wineries in Kansas, with many more in the planning stages. Many Kansas wines now routinely win national awards. In 2010, four of the 20 prestigious national Jefferson Cups were awarded to Kansas wines.

== See also ==
- American wine
- List of wineries in Kansas
