= Basehor-Linwood High School =

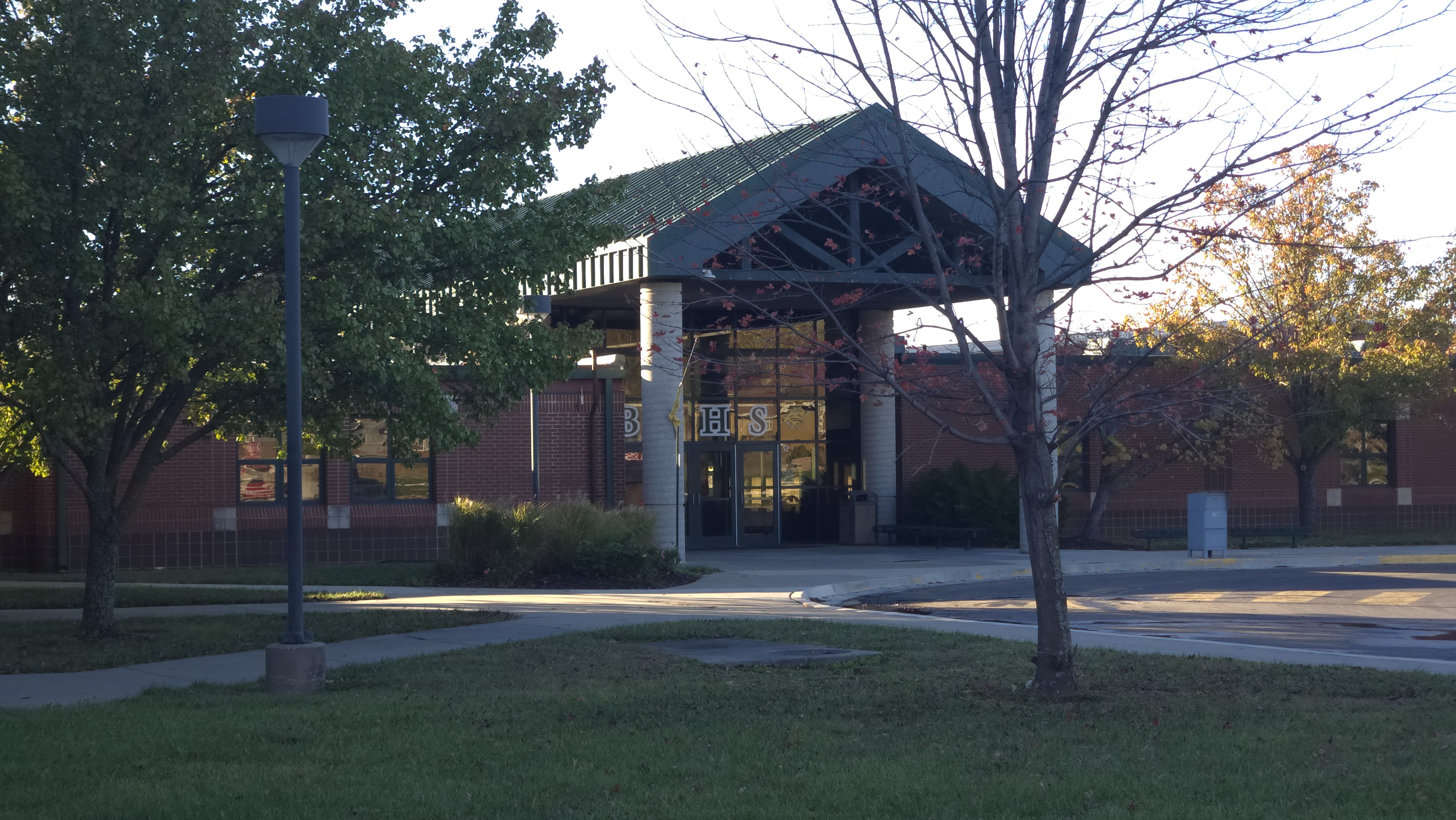
- BLHS Campus (2024)

Location
- 2108 155th St. Basehor, Kansas 66007; United States; 39.131630319939696°N 94.93973900018273°W

Information
- School type: Public, High School
- Established: 1966
- School district: Basehor-Linwood USD 458
- Principal: Erin Morrison (since 2023)
- Athletic Director: Shawn Phillips
- Staff: 104
- Teaching staff: 56.30 (FTE)
- Enrollment: 917 (2025–2026)
- Student to teacher ratio: 16.25
- Classes offered: Regular, Career Focus, Advanced Placement
- Campus type: Suburban
- Colors: Green; Gold
- Athletics conference: United Kansas Conference
- Mascot: Bobby The Bobcat
- Team name: Bobcats
- Rivals: Piper High School, De Soto High School
- Communities served: Basehor, Linwood, Fairmount (part), Reno Township, Sherman Township, Stranger Township (part)
- Website: blhs.usd458.org

Basehor-Linwood High School is a fully accredited public secondary school located in Basehor, Kansas, United States, serving students grades 9-12. It is operated by the Basehor-Linwood USD 458 school district, and is the only high school in the district. The school's official colors are green, gold, and white, and the mascot is the bobcat. Approximately 917 students currently attend the school.

Basehor-Linwood High School was founded in 1966 after a merger between the independent school districts of Basehor and Linwood, which had a total of nearly 90 square miles of area in southeastern Leavenworth County, and students began going to the same building in 1987. Basehor-Linwood is a member of the Kansas State High School Activities Association and offers a variety of sports programs. Athletic teams compete in the 5A division and are known as the "Bobcats."

== History ==
Basehor-Linwood High School was formed as a result of a merger between the Linwood School District and the Basehor School District that occurred in 1966, when the two districts combined to form Basehor-Linwood USD 458. The schools remained in two separate buildings until 1987 when the merger was finalized. Linwood High School closed on June 10, 1987, and remaining students were moved into the Basehor school building. Ward L. Kiester, who was the principal of Basehor High School at the time of merger’s finalization, was named the first superintendent of the district.

=== Basehor before merger ===
In 1905, the first high school classes were held above a general store. One year later, a new building was built for all of K-12. The high school met upstairs, while the lower grades occupied three downstairs classrooms. Reuben Basehor donated $1,000 to the school to build a library. In 1938, a brick two-story building was built as a part of the Works Progress Administration. In 1955, the grade school classes moved to a new facility, while the high school remained in this building until a new Basehor High School was constructed in 1962.

=== Linwood before merger ===
In 1921 a new high school opened, at a cost of $150,000.

== Academics ==
In 2011, Basehor-Linwood High School was selected for the National Blue Ribbon Award, which recognizes public and private schools throughout the country for extreme improvement or high academic achievement. At the time, students attending the school scored at the top 15% average in mathematics and reading in the State of Kansas. In September 2012, U.S. Secretary of Education Arne Duncan officially named Basehor-Linwood as a National Blue Ribbon School, along with 5 other schools in the Kansas City area.

== Athletics ==
The Bobcats compete in the United Kansas Conference and are classified as a 5A school, which is the second largest classification in Kansas according to the Kansas State High School Activities Association. Throughout its history, Basehor-Linwood has won several state championships in various sports. Many graduates have gone on to participate in college athletics.

== Demographics ==
As of the 2023-2024 school year, the school enrolled 857 students in grades 9-12, of which 12 were Asian, 11 Black, 89 Hispanic, none were Native Hawaiian/Pacific Islanders, 713 were White, and 32 students were of two or more races. 438 students were male, and 419 were female.

== Notable people ==
=== Alumni ===
- Ben Johnson, Football player
- Eric Scott, National Football League (NFL) football player

=== Faculty ===
- Timothy H. Johnson, politician, taught social-studies at Basehor-Linwood
- Scott Russell, Canadian Olympic javelin thrower, taught physical education at the school.

== See also ==
- List of high schools in Kansas
- List of unified school districts in Kansas
