= Basehor-Linwood USD 458 =

Public school district in Basehor, Kansas

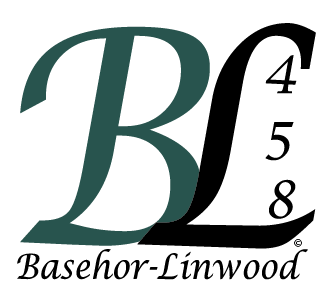

Location
- 2008 N 155th Street; Basehor, Kansas 66007 United States
- Coordinates: 39°07′46″N 94°56′19″W

District information
- Type: Public
- Motto: Each student develops and reaches their potential
- Grades: Pre-K-12
- Established: 1965
- Superintendent: Chris Vignery
- Accreditation: Kansas State Department of Education
- Schools: 8
- NCES District ID: 2003780

Students and staff
- Students: 3,097
- Teachers: 218
- Staff: 383

Other information
- Website: USD 458

Basehor-Linwood USD 458, also known as Basehor-Linwood School District or USD 458, is a public unified school district headquartered in Basehor, Kansas, United States. The district includes 90 square miles of area in southeastern Leavenworth County, and within the Kansas City Metropolitan Area. The district includes the communities of Basehor, Linwood, and Fairmount, and the townships of Fairmount, Stranger, Sherman, and Reno. There are approximately 3,000 students enrolled in the district. The district operates one high school, one middle school, and five elementary schools, and one pre-primary school.

== History ==
Basehor-Linwood USD 458 was formed as a result of a merger between the Basehor School District and the Linwood School District that occurred in 1965. The first superintendent of the district was Ward Kiester, who worked as the Principal of Basehor High School. The district had two separate high schools under one district, until students from Linwood High School were moved to the facility of Basehor High School.

Basehor-Linwood High School remains in the same building. A new middle school was built in 2010, replacing the old middle school building in Linwood. The district currently operates several elementary schools, a middle school, and a high school, and a pre-primary school.

== Bonds ==
In 2018, a bond was issued for the construction of the new Linwood Elementary school at the intersection of K-32 and Stillwell Road. The school was completed in 2022. The Early Learning Center also began construction under this new bond. In April of 2024, USD 458 voted to pass Bond 2024, which saw the construction of a 3-story multipurpose building at Basehor-Linwood High School, doubling the size of the school. Construction is expected to be completed in July of 2026.

== Schools ==
High Schools

Name	Date Opened	Enrollment (As of 2025)
Basehor-Linwood High School	1966	917

Middle Schools

Name	Date Opened	Enrollment (As of 2025)
Basehor-Linwood Middle School	2010	660

Elementary Schools
Name	Date Opened	Enrollment (As of 2025)
Basehor Elementary School (K-2)	1991	106
Linwood Elementary School	2022	247
Gray Hawk Elementary School	2018	262
Basehor Intermediate School (3-5)	2008	250
Glenwood Ridge Elementary School	2001	326

Pre-Elementary Schools
Name	Date Opened	Enrollment (As of 2025)
Basehor-Linwood Early Learning Center	2020	329

== See also ==
- Basehor, Kansas
- Linwood, Kansas
- List of high schools in Kansas
- List of unified school districts in Kansas
- Kansas State Department of Education
- Kansas State High School Activities Association
