= Free State Brewing Company =

Microbrewery located in Lawrence Kansas

The Free State Brewing Company is a microbrewery based in Lawrence, Kansas. It opened in 1989 as the first legal brewery in Kansas in over 100 years. It is named after the legacy of the free state movement during the Antebellum period of Bleeding Kansas. In that interest, the Company uses as their mascot the abolitionist John Brown as depicted in Tragic Prelude, a John Steuart Curry mural in the Kansas State Capitol building.

In 2010, the brewery announced plans to expand to distribute to vendors in Kansas and Missouri, and as far east as St. Louis. On May 21, 2010 Free State Brewery began to distribute bottled beer to stores in Lawrence, Kansas. Four bottled beers were released: Copperhead Pale Ale, Oatmeal Stout, Ad Astra Ale, and Wheat State Golden.

== Beers ==
The first beer Free State Brewing Company made, Ad Astra Ale (which takes its name from part of Kansas's state motto), won a Bronze Medal at the 1991 Great American Beer Festival.
