= Tallgrass (band) =

American music trio

Tallgrass is an American musical trio from Fort Collins. The band is composed of two brothers, drummer Adam and bassist Austin Morford and their longtime friend, guitarist and banjoist Matt Skinner. Their music is a mixture of gospel, bluegrass and folk.

== History ==
Tallgrass was formed in May 2011 and has released two full albums. The band performs nationally and has played festivals including Snowmass Mammoth Fest and the Telluride Blues & Brews Festival. In 2012 Tallgrass performed before a speech delivered by President Barack Obama.

In 2014 the band performed a concert in their home town of Iowa City.

== Albums ==
Their debut album, God, Sin, Whiskey, and Women was released in the summer of 2012. The album is a mixture of old-timey and contemporary sounds with three-part harmonies.

Better Than Medicine is the group's second album. The album mixes a little bluegrass and three-part harmonies with pop.

== Members ==
Adam Morford - Drums, piano, vocals Austin Morford - Bass, guitar, vocals Matt Skinner - Guitar, banjo, bass, harmonica, vocals, chair
