= Fairmount, Kansas =

- Unincorporated community
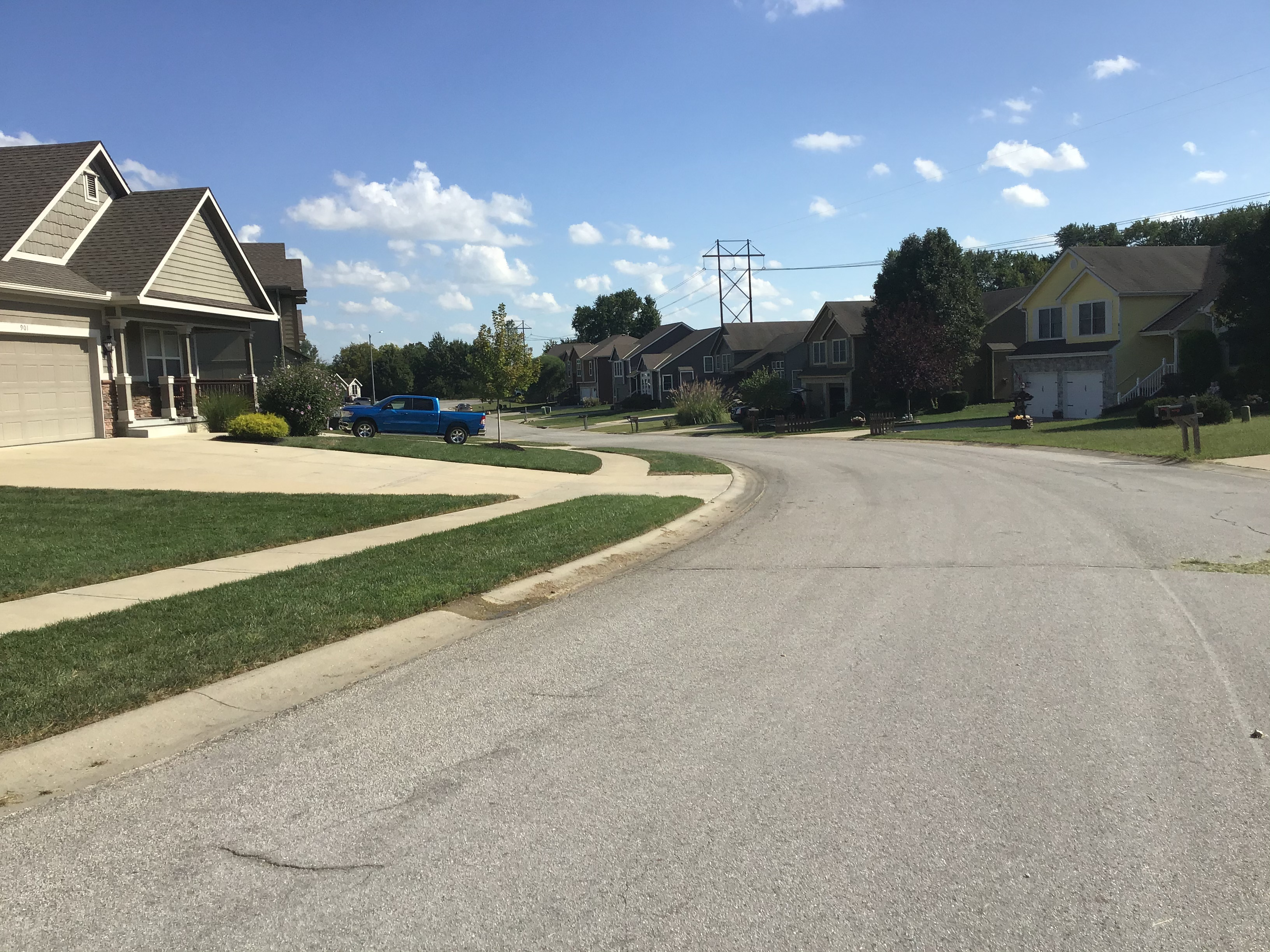
- A housing division within the community of Fairmount (2021)

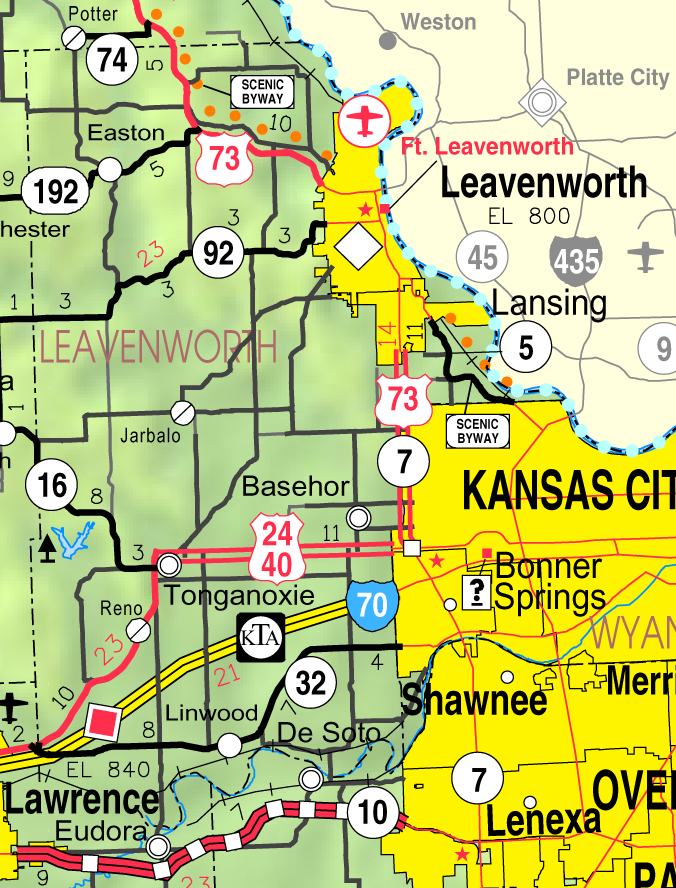
- KDOT map of Leavenworth County (legend)

- Location within Kansas Location within the United States
- Coordinates: 39°11′30″N 94°56′08″W
- Country: United States
- State: Kansas
- County: Leavenworth
- Platted: 1867
- Elevation: 981 ft (299 m)
- Time zone: UTC-6 (CST)
  - Summer (DST): UTC-5 (CDT)
- Area code: 913
- FIPS code: 20-22300
- GNIS ID: 478558

Fairmount is an unincorporated community in Leavenworth County, Kansas, United States. It is part of the Kansas City metropolitan area, and located north of the city of Basehor.

== History ==
Fairmount was platted in 1867. In 1912, Fairmount contained four stores and one factory. The Fairmount post office closed in 1934.

Currently, Fairmount contains several housing suburbs, near the city limits of Lake Quivira, Bonner Springs, Basehor, and the neighborhood of Piper in Kansas City, Kansas. It's fire and medical services are provided by Fairmount Township Fire and Rescue the Kansas City Kansas Fire Department. Policing services are provided by the Leavenworth and Wyandotte County Sheriff's Office, and the Basehor Police Department.

== Education ==
The community is served by Lansing USD 469 and Basehor–Linwood USD 458 public school districts. USD 469 serves northern Fairmount, USD 458 serves southern Fairmount.
