= Tallgrass Brewing Company =

Craft brewery founded in Manhattan, Kansas

- Location: Manhattan, Kansas, United States
- Opened: 2007
- Closed: 2018
- Annual production volume: 15,000 US bbl (18,000 hl) (2017)

Tallgrass Brewing Company is a brand of beers brewed and distributed by the Wichita Brewing Company and a former craft brewery that was located in Manhattan, Kansas, that operated from 2006 to 2018. At the time of its closing, Tallgrass was the largest brewery in Kansas, and was distributed in 18 states. In August 2018, Tallgrass announced that it would be shutting down operations indefinitely. In 2020, Wichita Brewing company signed a licensing agreement and began brewing and distributing four beers formerly brewed by the company under the Tallgrass Brewing Company brand.

== History ==
The brewery was founded by Jeff Gill in 2006. Gill was a former geologist, who had learned brewing as a homebrewer. Though initially the beers were bottled, the brewery switched to cans in 2010 for environmental and quality reasons. In 2014, the Brewery moved from its original warehouse space, to a warehouse space near Manhattan Regional Airport. The expansion increased the brewery's capacity from a Tallgrass record 365,000 gallons produced in 2013, to the ability to brew 3 million gallons per year.

At the same time, Tallgrass opened a brewpub, called Tallgrass Taphouse on Poyntz Avenue in downtown Manhattan.

In August 2018, Tallgrass announced that it would be shutting down operations indefinitely, although the Taphouse brewpub remains open.

In 2020, Wichita Brewing Company signed a licensing agreement to revive the brand and start brewing once popular beers from Tallgrass. The beers are brewed using original equipment from the Tallgrass brewery that was purchased in 2015.

In 2026, Walnut River Brewing Company signed a new licensing agreement to take over production and distribution of the Tallgrass Brewing Company beers.

== Products ==
- Buffalo Sweat – oatmeal cream stout (now brewed by Walnut River Brewing Company)
- Vanilla Bean Buffalo Sweat – oatmeal cream stout with vanilla beans (seasonal beer; brewed by Walnut River Brewing Company)
- 8-Bit pale ale – hoprocketed American Pale Ale (now brewed by Walnut River Brewing Company)
- Ethos IPA – American IPA
- Key Lime Pie – sour Berliner Weisse with lime peel (seasonal beer; brewed by Walnut River Brewing Company)
- King Buffalo – an Imperial Oatmeal Cream Stout
- Pub Ale (previously Tallgrass Ale) – an English mild
- Raspberry Jam – a sour Berliner Weiss with raspberries (now brewed by Walnut River Brewing Company)
- Velvet Rooster – Belgian-style tripel
- Zombie Monkey – Robust porter first released in 2014

== Further resources ==
- "Brewing TV - Episodes - Brewing TV - Episode 64: Tallgrass Brewing Company".
