= Basehor, Kansas =

- City
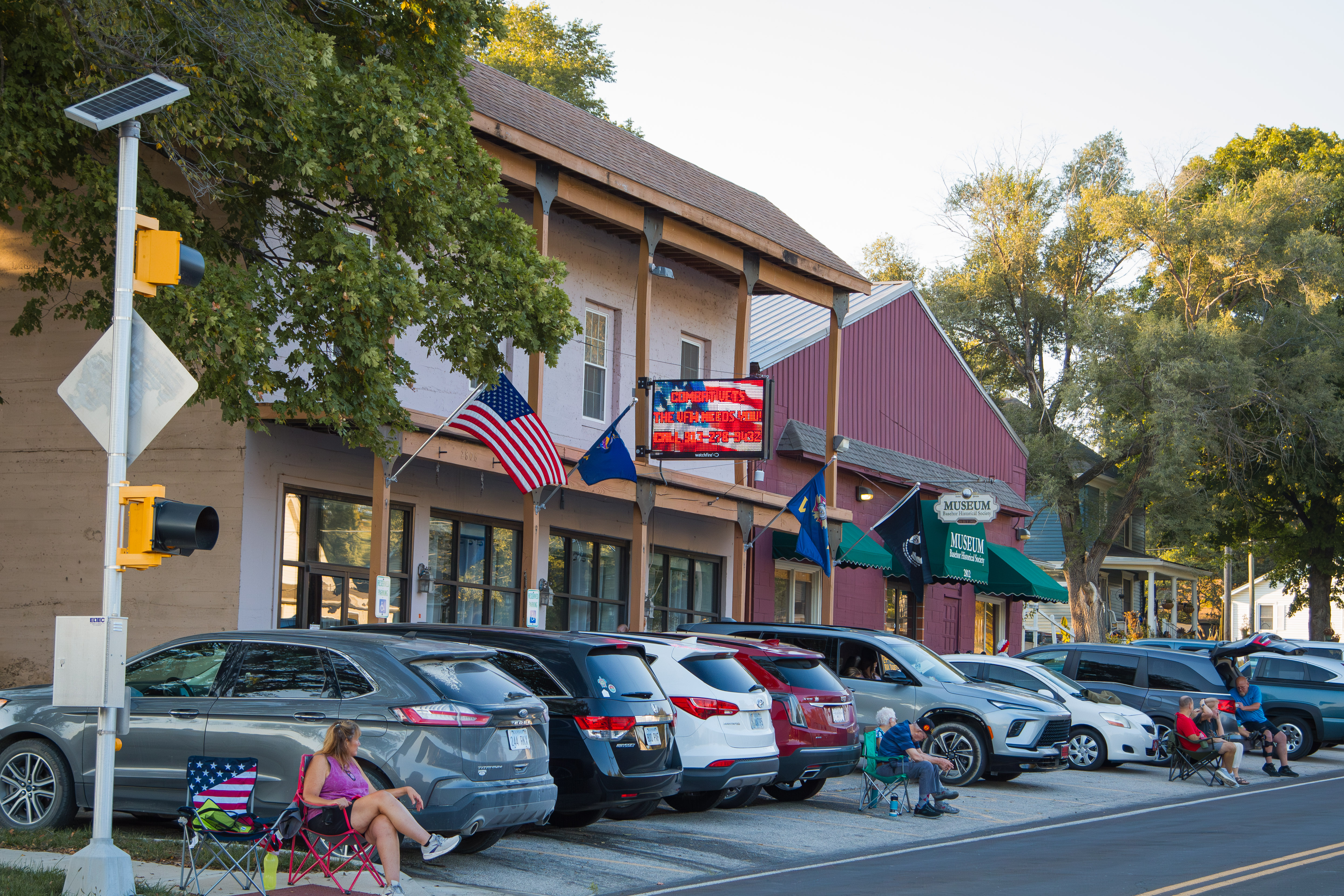
- Downtown Basehor (2025)

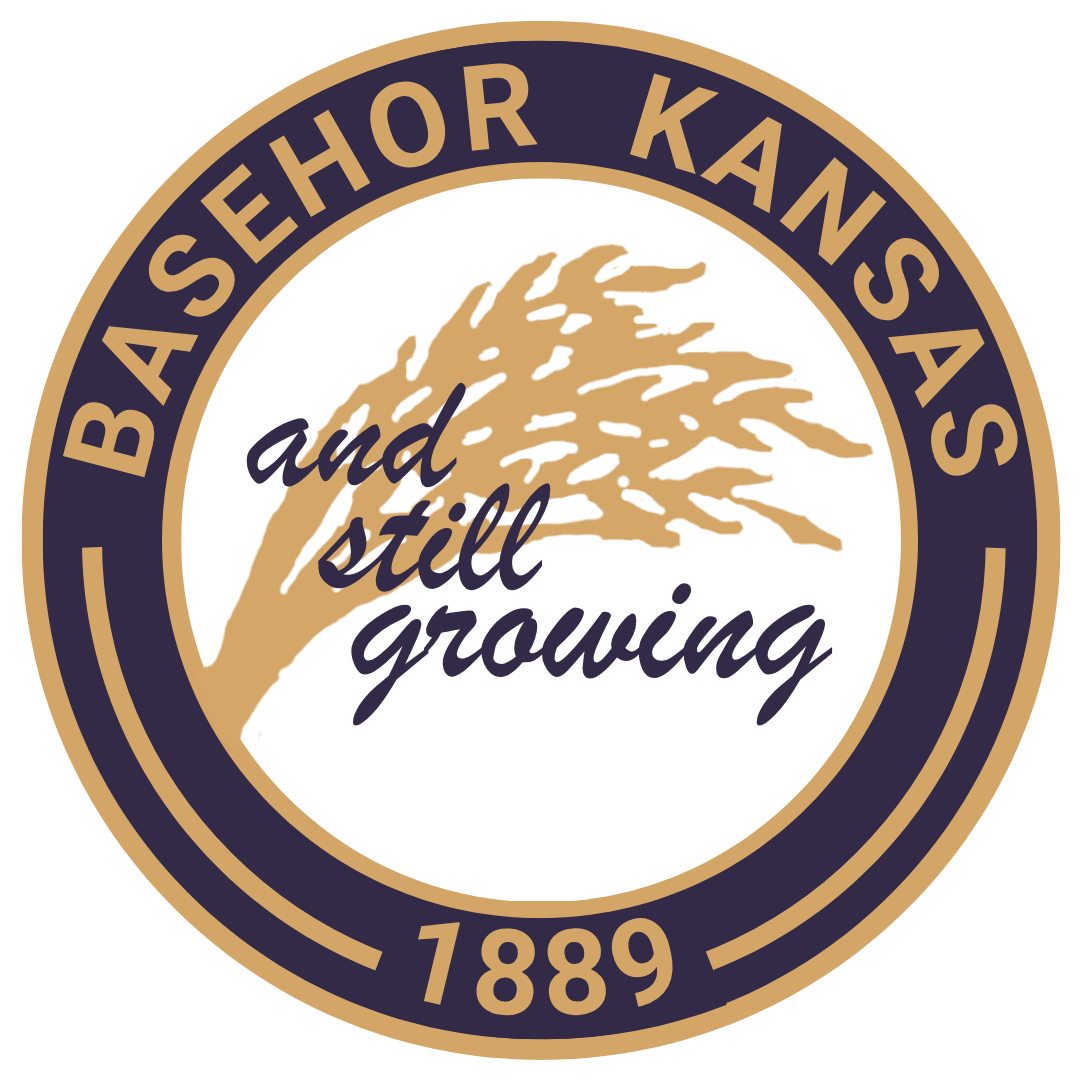
- Flag Seal

- Location within Leavenworth County and Kansas
- Interactive map of Basehor, Kansas
- Coordinates: 39°08′00″N 94°56′00″W
- Country: United States
- State: Kansas
- County: Leavenworth
- Founded: 1889
- Incorporated: 1965
- Named for: Reuben and Ephraim Basehor (brothers)

Government
  - Type: Mayor–Council
  - Mayor: Richard Drennon

Area
  - Total: 7.24 sq mi (18.74 km^{2})
  - Land: 7.14 sq mi (18.50 km^{2})
  - Water: 0.093 sq mi (0.24 km^{2})
- Elevation: 984 ft (300 m)

Population (2020)
  - Total: 6,896
  - Density: 965.4/sq mi (372.8/km^{2})
- Time zone: UTC-6 (CST)
  - Summer (DST): UTC-5 (CDT)
- ZIP Code: 66007
- Area code: 913
- FIPS code: 20-04400
- GNIS ID: 2394073
- Website: cityofbasehor.org

Basehor (/ˈbeɪsər/ BAY-sər) is a city in Leavenworth County, Kansas, United States, and part of the Kansas City metropolitan area. As of the 2020 census, the population of the city was 6,896. It is the 3rd largest city in Leavenworth County by population. Basehor is named after Reuben and Ephraim Basehor, who founded the town as a farming community.

== History ==
In exchange for extensive Delaware holdings in the state of Indiana, on September 24, 1829, the United States government ceded a large tract of land to the Delaware Indians. Basehor is built on a small part of this tract. The Delawares held this land, or at least parts of it, until the 1860s. On July 4, 1866, the Secretary of the Interior of the United States was offered for sale what was left of the Delaware lands, then referred to as the Delaware Diminished Reserve, for not less than $2.50 per acre. The Leavenworth, Pawnee, and Western Railroad Company subsequently bought all of the remaining land on January 7, 1886.

The first individuals to own the land upon which Basehor now stands were Thomas Salem and Mary Z. Towne (though William Henery Lewis, who surveyed for the railroad, bought an extensive plot of land to the northeast of Basehor around 1861 and homesteaded it right after the Civil War). The couple bought it from the railroad in 1873 and mortgaged it to Ephraim Basehor the same year. On January 9, 1874, the Townes sold the 160 acres (0.65 km^{2}) to Basehor. Ephriam and Reuben's nephew William Mast later moved to Basehor and in 1896 married Margaret Towne, the daughter of the couple from whom they had purchased the land.

Basehor was founded in 1889 by Reuben Basehor and his brother Ephraim. They both were of Pennsylvania Dutch descent and came to Kansas in 1854. After living in Lawrence for a time, Ephraim began working as a hired hand for an area farmer. He eventually bought the farm and other land holdings in the area.

In 1889, the railroad was completed, and Ephraim plotted his land and began building the town site. It was dedicated on November 30, 1889, and was named after Basehor.

Ephraim Basehor donated the land for the schoolhouse around 1900. The old grade school was located north of town and was originally called the Prairie Garden District #32. The first high school classes in the community met in 1905 above the Kemler-Hammond General Store. In 1906, a building was erected to house the high school and grade school. It was built for K–12 on the southeast corner of 155th Street and Leavenworth Road. The high school was upstairs, and K–8 was located in the three classrooms downstairs. In 1929, five students graduated.

Reuben Basehor donated $1,000 to the school to build a library. With this donation, a concrete structure was built east of the old school. After many years of disuse, the library building was moved to the city park in June, 2016. A new two-story brick high school was built as a WPA project in 1938. The grade-school classes continued to be held in the old building until a new grade school was built in 1955. By 1963, a new high school was built, and the older building was taken over by the top two grades of the grade school. In 2008, the community built a new library on 158th St.

== Geography ==
According to the United States Census Bureau, the city has a total area of 6.75 square miles (17.48 km^{2}), of which 0.07 square miles (0.18 km^{2}) is covered by water.

== Demographics ==
Historical population
Census	Pop.	Note	%±
1970	724		—
1980	1,483		104.8%
1990	1,591		7.3%
2000	2,238		40.7%
2010	4,613		106.1%
2020	6,896		49.5%
2023 (est.)	7,719		11.9%
U.S. Decennial Census; 2010-2020

=== Racial and ethnic composition ===
Basehor city, Kansas – Racial and ethnic composition Note: the US Census treats Hispanic/Latino as an ethnic category. This table excludes Latinos from the racial categories and assigns them to a separate category. Hispanics/Latinos may be of any race.
Race / Ethnicity (NH = Non-Hispanic)	Pop 2000	Pop 2010	Pop 2020	% 2000	% 2010	% 2020
White alone (NH)	2,154	4,230	5,929	96.25%	91.70%	85.98%
Black or African American alone (NH)	8	108	160	0.36%	2.34%	2.32%
Native American or Alaska Native alone (NH)	6	18	27	0.27%	0.39%	0.39%
Asian alone (NH)	16	24	77	0.71%	0.52%	1.12%
Native Hawaiian or Pacific Islander alone (NH)	1	1	0	0.04%	0.02%	0.00%
Other race alone (NH)	0	1	16	0.00%	0.02%	0.23%
Mixed race or Multiracial (NH)	17	63	318	0.76%	1.37%	4.61%
Hispanic or Latino (any race)	36	168	369	1.61%	3.64%	5.35%
Total	2,238	4,613	6,896	100.00%	100.00%	100.00%

=== 2020 census ===
As of the 2020 census, Basehor had a population of 6,896, with 2,531 households and 1,968 families. The median age was 39.1 years. 27.5% of residents were under the age of 18, 5.3% were from 18 to 24, 26.3% were from 25 to 44, 24.4% were from 45 to 64, and 16.5% were 65 years of age or older. For every 100 females, there were 95.2 males, and for every 100 females age 18 and over, there were 92.0 males.

15.2% of residents lived in urban areas, while 84.8% lived in rural areas.

Of the city's 2,531 households, 39.0% had children under the age of 18, 63.9% were married-couple households, 10.9% were households with a male householder and no spouse or partner present, and 20.3% were households with a female householder and no spouse or partner present. About 18.8% of households consisted of individuals, and 10.1% had someone living alone who was 65 years of age or older. The average household size was 2.8 and the average family size was 3.4. There were 2,596 housing units, of which 2.5% were vacant. The homeowner vacancy rate was 1.0% and the rental vacancy rate was 2.8%. The population density was 965.3 per square mile (372.7/km^{2}). There were 2,596 housing units at an average density of 363.4 per square mile (140.3/km^{2}).

The non-Hispanic white population was 85.98% of the city's population.

Racial composition as of the 2020 census
Race	Number	Percent
White	6,046	87.7%
Black or African American	168	2.4%
American Indian and Alaska Native	32	0.5%
Asian	80	1.2%
Native Hawaiian and Other Pacific Islander	0	0.0%
Some other race	96	1.4%
Two or more races	474	6.9%

=== Demographic estimates ===
The 2016–2020 5-year American Community Survey estimates show that the percent of those with a bachelor's degree or higher was 19.6% of the population.

=== Income and poverty ===
The 2016–2020 5-year American Community Survey estimates show that the median household income was $84,906 (with a margin of error of +/- $11,057) and the median family income was $94,119 (+/- $11,709). Males had a median income of $64,922 (+/- $17,780) versus $36,134 (+/- $1,906) for females. The median income for those above 16 years old was $42,685 (+/- $8,955). Approximately, 8.8% of families and 7.2% of the population were below the poverty line, including 3.5% of those under the age of 18 and 6.5% of those ages 65 or over.

=== 2010 census ===
As of the census of 2010, 4,613 people, 1,751 households, and 1,337 families were living in the city. The population density was 690.6 inhabitants per square mile (266.6/km^{2}). The 1,881 housing units had an average density of 281.6 per square mile (108.7/km^{2}). The racial makeup of the city was 94.1% White, 2.5% African American, 0.4% Native American, 0.5% Asian, 0.5% from other races, and 1.9% from two or more races. Hispanics or Latinos of any race were 3.6% of the population.

Of the 1,751 households, 37.4% had children under 18 living with them, 62.8% were married couples living together, 9.4% had a female householder with no husband present, 4.1% had a male householder with no wife present, and 23.6% were not families. About 19.3% of all households were made up of individuals, and 7.7% had someone living alone who was 65 or older. The average household size was 2.63, and the average family size was 3.02.

The median age in the city was 37.6 years; 26.5% of residents were under 18; 6% were between 18 and 24; 28.4% were from 25 to 44; 27% were from 45 to 64; and 12.2% were 65 or older. The gender makeup of the city was 48.5% male and 51.5% female.

== Education ==
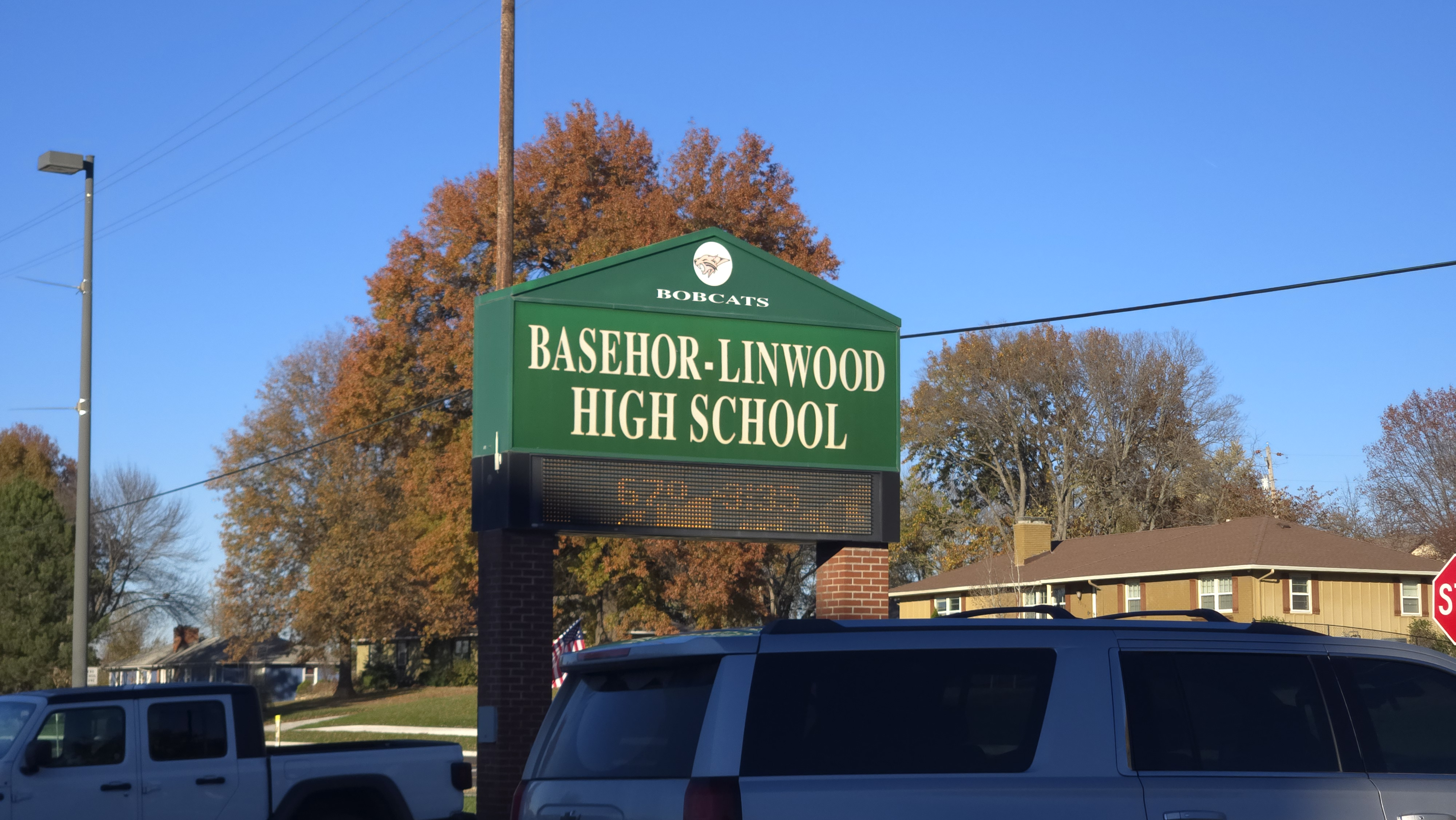
Basehor-Linwood High School sign

The community is served by Basehor-Linwood USD 458 public school district. The Basehor-Linwood High School is located in Basehor. The district has five elementary schools: Glenwood Ridge Elementary located directly across from the middle school, Basehor Elementary School, Basehor Intermediate School, Gray Hawk Elementary School, and Linwood Elementary School, located in Linwood.
