= Santa Margarita Ranch AVA =

Appellation that designates wine in San Luis Obispo County, CA

Coordinates: 35°22′29″N 120°38′51″W

Santa Margarita Ranch
- Wine region
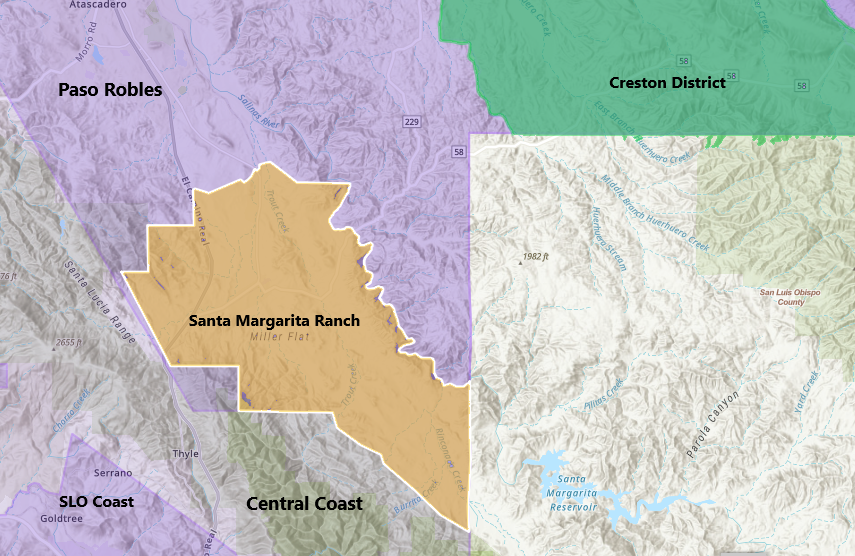
- Type: American Viticultural Area
- Year established: 2014
- Years of wine industry: 246
- Country: United States
- Part of: California, Central Coast AVA, San Luis Obispo County, Paso Robles AVA
- Other regions in California, Central Coast AVA, San Luis Obispo County, Paso Robles AVA: Adelaida District AVA, Creston District AVA, El Pomar District AVA, Paso Robles Estrella District AVA, Paso Robles Geneseo District AVA, Paso Robles Highlands District AVA, Paso Robles Willow Creek District AVA, San Juan Creek AVA, San Miguel District AVA, Templeton Gap District AVA
- Growing season: 271 days
- Climate region: Region II
- Heat units: 2,900 GDD units
- Precipitation (annual average): 29 in (740 mm)
- Soil conditions: Deep alluvial soils derived from many lithologies and varying in texture, with patchy residual soils on mountain slopes
- Total area: 17,835 acres (28 sq mi)
- Size of planted vineyards: 800 acres (320 ha)
- No. of vineyards: 2
- Grapes produced: Cabernet Sauvignon, Chardonnay, Merlot, Nebbiolo, Pinot Noir, Sangiovese, Syrah, Zinfandel
- No. of wineries: 2

Santa Margarita Ranch is an American Viticultural Area (AVA) located in San Luis Obispo County, California and lies within the multi-county Central Coast AVA. It was established as the nation's 226^{th}, the state's 142^{nd} and the county's fifteenth appellation on October 9, 2014 by the Alcohol and Tobacco Tax and Trade Bureau (TTB), Treasury after reviewing the petitions submitted by the Paso Robles American Viticultural Area Committee (PRAVAC) to establish 11 new viticultural areas located entirely within the existing 669,253-acre (1,046 sq mi) Paso Robles viticultural area adjacent to the northern boundary of San Luis Obispo County. The proposed viticultural areas were: Adelaida District, Creston District, El Pomar District, Paso Robles Estrella District, Paso Robles Geneseo District, Paso Robles Highlands District, Paso Robles Willow Creek District, San Juan Creek, San Miguel District, Santa Margarita Ranch, and Templeton Gap District.

Santa Margarita Ranch encompasses about 17,835 acres (28 sq mi) with a little over 800 acres (320 ha) under vine and encircles the town of Santa Margarita. It is located at the southernmost boundary of the Paso Robles viticultural area nestled against the Santa Lucia Mountain Range and distinctly isolated from the other ten sub-appellations established on the same day. The area is actually closer to the county seat of San Luis Obispo than to Paso Robles. Syrah has played a pivotal role in the AVA, with Cabernet Sauvignon, Zinfandel, Merlot, Pinot Noir and Chardonnay also featured in its grape inventory.

== Name evidence ==
The name "Santa Margarita Ranch" (/ˈsanta maɾɣaˈɾita/ SAN-ta mar-ga-REE-ta) is a well-recognized, historically significant geographic place name for the region in which the viticultural area is located. The name is based on the Spanish "assistance mission" Santa Margarita de Cortona Asistencia, which was located within the area as an outpost of Mission San Luis Obispo de Tolosa. Historically, the lands of the Santa Margarita mission were known as "Rancho Santa Margarita," and today, local residents still refer to the region as Santa Margarita Ranch. TTB notes that the "Santa Margarita Land Grant" is marked on the Lopez Mountain, San Luis Obispo, Santa Margarita, and Atascadero USGS maps, and that the great majority of the Santa Margarita Land Grant is within the viticultural area. The Santa Margarita USGS map also shows the later, and still-existent, Santa Margarita Ranch located beside Santa Margarita Creek just north of the small town of Santa Margarita, all of which are located within the viticultural area. In addition, the region is served by the Santa Margarita Cemetery District.
The petition requests that only the full name of "Santa Margarita Ranch" be considered viticulturally significant to more specifically identify the location of the viticultural area and to avoid affecting any existing label holders. The petition explains that the term "Santa Margarita" presently is used in the brand name of Santa Margarita Winery in Temecula Valley AVA, and in the homonymous Italian wine brand Santa Margherita.

== Boundary evidence ==
The Santa Margarita Ranch viticultural area extends southeast-to-northwest approximately 9 miles (14 km), and its boundary roughly follows the historic Santa Margarita Land Grant boundary, with a few minor variations to exclude areas that are currently unavailable for viticulture. Approximately half of the boundary of the Santa Margarita Ranch viticultural area on its east, south, and west sides is concurrent with the boundary of the Paso Robles viticultural area. The northern portion of the Santa Margarita Ranch viticultural area boundary follows a combination of a land grant line, roads, and section lines that approximately delineate the northernmost extent of the Santa Margarita Land Grant region that is suitable for viticultural development, while excluding the urbanized areas of Atascadero to the north and the rugged terrain to the northeast. The eastern portion of the boundary follows the Salinas River to the point where it becomes concurrent with the Paso Robles viticultural area boundary, which it then follows south across the Santa Margarita Valley. The terrain to the east of the boundary is steep and rugged, and the region to the southeast includes terraces, benches and a generally flat valley floor. The southern and southwestern portions of the Santa Margarita District viticultural area boundary are based on the Santa Margarita Grant line, section lines, and the boundary of the Los Padres National Forest. While the southern and southwestern portions of the boundary largely coincide with the existing Paso Robles viticultural area boundary, the southwestern corner of the originally proposed boundary was modified at TTB's request to remove approximately 800 acres (320 ha) of land located in the Los Padres National Forest that is unavailable for commercial viticulture. In this southwestern region, the boundary of the Santa Margarita Ranch viticultural area follows the boundary of the Los Padres National Forest, slightly to the east and then north of the established Paso Robles viticultural area boundary. The remainder of the western portion of the boundary is located along the eastern foothills of the Santa Lucia Range, and it follows the southwestern portion of the Paso Robles viticultural area boundary.

== History ==
Santa Margarita Ranch today remains one of California's oldest historic sites, beginning with the Chumash and Salinan peoples who for more than 10,000 years they called this valley their home. In 1772, Mission San Luis Obispo de Tolosa was established further south by the Franciscan monks as the fifth mission along the California coast. The indigenous inhabitants kept telling the padres of this beautiful valley just north over the mountain from the Mission. The padres were intrigued and finally accompanied the natives over the Cuesta Grade in 1774, and they found the beautiful Santa Margarita valley. They discovered a small village with about 300 inhabitants, and dutifully evangelized the natives to Christianity. At first, they built an outdoor shrine with a bell to call the people to worship and a large wooden cross was the center of the shrine. Eventually, the padres convinced the natives to help them build a structure from local stones. They named it Santa Margarita de Cortona Asistencia and it was formally recognized as an "assistance mission" to San Luis Obispo de Tolosa. The rock and adobe walls of Asistencia still stand today used as a storage barn on the ranch and commonly referred as San Luis Obispo County's "third mission."

A third mission is often claimed for this county, as having been established at a very early date at Santa Margarita. A building was erected on the sightly bench of land in the lovely valley northeast of the Santa Lucia Range, about eight miles (13 km) north of San Luis Obispo and dedicated to its patroness, Santa Margarita, but it was only a branch of the mission of San Luis Obispo de Toloso, and under its management. The walls of rough stone and cement, a coarse inartistic structure, still stand, interesting as a reminiscence of the past and picturesque as a ruin of one of the sacred edifices of early California. Rev. Walter Colton refers to this as built for a granary of one of the ranchos cultivated by the good Father Martinez, of San Luis Obispo, and that it was usually well filled with grain. A great rancho now embraces the old ruin, the rancho of Santa Margarita, of 17,735 acres in extent, and the owner, Gen. P.W. Murphy, exercises the protecting care over the pleasant and romantic locality.

The mission padres and indigenous natives carried on extensive grain cultivation on the Asistencia. Wheat, grapes and vegetable crops were grown and cattle raised to support the mission community in the late 18th century. After Mexico secured its independence from Spain in 1822, the mission properties were privatized. The lands of the Asistencia, the Rancho Santa Margarita, were acquired by Joaquin Estrada on September 27, 1841. The grant included 17,735 acres (28 sq mi), and Estrada promised in his petition for the land that he would not prevent the mission from using the house on the rancho and that he would respect the acreage used for planting by the mission natives. Estrada is said to have lived rather large, and "[i]t is reported that the time came when his worldly goods were largely dissipated—thousands of acres of land, thousands of cattle and horses."

The modern part of the history starts with the arrival of the Europeans. Joaquin Murrieta, a famous Mexican bandit, was known to have a hideout in the Salinas River. In 1847, John C. Frémont marched through, arresting ranch owner Joaquin Estrada on his way to attack the Mexican army in Santa Barbara. Later, the ranch was visited by the James boys as Frank and Jesse hid out at their uncle's La Panza Ranch east of Santa Margarita. When the land was patented by the United States government in April 1861, ownership transferred to Mary and Martin Murphy Jr. The historian Myron Angel described the lands of the Santa Margarita Ranch in 1883 as follows:

It consists of a valley, that of the Salinas River, some two miles in width and extending along the river perhaps eight or nine miles. The tract has always been celebrated for its fertility ever since the Franciscan missionaries began to till its soil and establish warehouses to contain the extraordinary crops of frijoles, garbanzos, maiz, and other esculents.
Later on, when the Mexican lords of the manor reigned at Santa Margarita, the place was given up to the support of great herds of horned cattle, and agriculture was neglected. In time the long-horned Mexican cattle have been replaced by better breeds, but still the greater part of this unequaled valley is devoted to beef raising.

In 1780, Franciscan missionaries first cultivated wine grapes on the ranch at the Asistencia, later known as Santa Margarita Vineyards. A classic head-pruned vineyard was later planted sometime in the 1800s. In the early 1900s, the vineyards had multiple crops including wheat, barley, cattle and sheep. Since that time viticulture had not played a role in the region's agricultural development until Robert Mondavi Winery leased over a thousand acres for vineyard development in the 2000s. Many years of planting and development ensued after, as well as a change in ownership. Currently, as Ancient Peaks Winery ranch, remnants of the old winegrowing days are evident, including an arbor vine at its headquarters and a gone-wild 60-foot vine in a nearby creek bed. The vineyard originally developed by Mondavi Winery is now over 850 acres (340 ha) with 16 varieties of wine grapes.

== Terroir ==
=== Topography ===
The valley floor and surrounding hillsides dominate the landscape, with elevations ranging from 900 to 1,400 ft (270–430 m)}. Santa Margarita Ranch is located within the narrow, southeast-to-northwest Santa Margarita Valley, between the La Panza Range and Salinas River to the east and the Santa Lucia Range to the west. Elevations within the viticultural area range from approximately 900 ft (270 m) at the Salinas River in its northeast corner to approximately 1,400 ft (430 m) in its northwest corner along the Los Padres National Forest boundary. The valley floor, at approximately 1,100 to 1,200 ft (340–370 m)} in elevation, includes a nearly flat landscape with gradual inclines and some hills to the north near the town of Santa Margarita. Numerous creeks flow through the Santa Margarita Valley to the Salinas River, including Santa Margarita Creek, Yerba Buena Creek, Trout Creek, Burrito Creek, and Rinconada Creek. Vineyards within the Santa Margarita Ranch viticultural area are planted primarily on the valley floor, across gently rolling terraces and perched above the creek beds. Because the vineyards are planted on the valley floor, they are at a risk of frost when cold air drains into the valley from the surrounding mountains at night. A small groundwater basin within the Santa Margarita Valley is the primary water resource for the Santa Margarita Ranch viticultural area, both for irrigation and frost protection. In contrast, most of the Paso Robles viticultural area relies on a large[groundwater basin east of the city of Paso Robles for water resources.

=== Climate ===
The Santa Margarita Ranch viticultural area has a mountain-valley climate, which is distinctive within the Paso Robles viticultural area, due to its location within the narrow Santa Margarita Valley. The Santa Margarita Ranch viticultural area has a moderate marine influence and has a relatively cool Winkler Region II climate, approximately 2,900 GDDs, as documented by data from the Santa Margarita Boost weather station located at the top of the Chorro Creek watershed. Precipitation in the Santa Margarita Ranch viticultural area 29 in (737 mm) annually, generally higher than the precipitation amounts received in other regions within the Paso Robles viticultural area. Some marine air is able to enter the viticultural area through the Cuesta Pass in the Santa Lucia Range, and significant annual precipitation results from Pacific storms that release water across the high mountain ridges of the Santa Lucia Range into the viticultural area. As compared to the Templeton Gap District and Paso Robles Willow Creek District viticultural areas to the north, the growing season in the Santa Margarita Ranch viticultural area is less affected by the marine influence entering the Paso Robles region through the Templeton Gap. This reduced marine influence results in higher daytime maximum and lower nighttime minimum temperatures. In addition, cold air drains from the surrounding higher elevations and ponds in the Santa Margarita Valley. As a result, frost is an issue on the valley floor during the early growing season, and frost protection is a necessity for area vineyards. The USDA plant hardiness zone is 9a to 9b.

=== Soils ===
There are two active faults, the Nacimiento and Rinconada, that run through Santa Margarita Ranch. Over time, these faults are largely responsible for the rare array of soil types: rock alluvium, granite, volcanic, shale and ancient seabed, that are visible to the naked eye. The soils of the Santa Margarita Ranch viticultural area are a series of young, sandy loam to loam soils in the floodplains of the creeks, loam and gravelly loam soils on the terraces, clay loams on the highest terraces and hillsides, and pockets of clay soils in low-lying basins. The diversity of soil types reflects the ages of the alluvial terrace fans and the bedrock (or parent) material type, sometimes mixed from several geological formations. Parent materials include Monterey Shale, San Margarita Sandstone, Cretaceous granite, Cretaceous marine sandstones, and conglomerates. A curiosity in the region lies within Santa Margarita Ranch at the Oyster Ridge where large, fossilized oyster shells are evidently abundant. This is reflective of an ancient shallow seabed that allowed oysters to thrive into exceptionally large specimens. The 1978 soil survey for the Paso Robles area indicates that vineyards within the viticultural area contain soils that are primarily Mollisols (deep, rich, grassland soils), with smaller areas of younger Entisols and Inceptisols, clay-rich Vertisols, and older, leached Alfisols (where soil leaching to depth has occurred through time). The soils are slightly acidic at the surface (pH values of 5.6 to 7.0), and either acidic or alkaline at depth (pH varying from 5.1 to 8.4, influenced by both parent material and time). Few of the soils within the viticultural area are calcareous, unlike the soils to the north within the Templeton Gap District, Paso Robles Willow Creek District, and Adelaida District viticultural areas. Most of the soils within the Santa Margarita Ranch viticultural area are considered fertile, due to the presence of abundant humus. In order to prevent overly vigorous growth in the fertile soils, vines are spaced closely together to promote root competition, and water is carefully managed.

== Viticulture ==
Cattle were first introduced to the Santa Margarita Ranch land by Franciscan missionaries in 1774 and have remained prominent ever since. Santa Margarita Ranch currently endures as one of California's oldest continuously operated cattle ranches, and the ownership families of Ancient Peaks Winery also are actively involved in the ranching operations. The modern era of winegrowing on Santa Margarita Ranch began with the planting of Margarita Vineyard in 1999 by the Robert Mondavi family. In 2005, the ranch's three ownership families assumed the vineyard's lease and started Ancient Peaks Winery. Ancient Peaks wines are today distributed across 48 states as well as Canada and Japan. The winery is renowned for its Cabernet Sauvignon, Zinfandel, Oyster Ridge Bordeaux-style blend and other wines that reflect the unique character of this sustainably farmed estate. Ancient Peaks with Margarita Vineyard and the boutique Soaring Hawk Vineyards are the two resident wineries in Santa Margarita Ranch.
