= Whalebone Vineyard =

- Location: Paso Robles, California
- Coordinates: 35.6192°N 120.8477°W
- Appellation: Paso Robles AVA
- Founded: 1986
- Key people: Bob Simpson
- Cases/yr: 2,500-3,300
- Varietal: Cabernet Sauvignon
- Website: http://www.whalebonevineyard.com

Whalebone Vineyard is a California wine estate producing primarily Cabernet and other red and white wines in Paso Robles, California. The vineyard is located in the Adelaida District AVA of the Paso Robles AVA.

== History ==
The vineyard was started in 1986 when Bob and Janalyn Simpson purchased 128 acres from the King Vidor Estate. The Simpsons planted 10.6 acres in Cabernet grapes. Situated at 1,800 feet (550 m) of elevation and 14 miles (23 km) from the Pacific Ocean, the terrain of the area is marked by ancient calcareous soils, diurnal temperature variations of nearly 50 °F (10 °C), and warm, dry growing seasons. The name of the vineyard derives from the large calcareous rocks laden with whalebones and other marine mammal fossils in the soil, remnants of the Miocene geological epoch some six million years ago. Notable adjacent properties include Tablas Creek Vineyard, owned by the Perrin Brothers of Château de Beaucastel and Robert Hass, and Adelaida Cellars,

== Wines ==
Whalebone Vineyard bottles annual vintages of Cabernet Sauvignon, Zinfandel, Rhône wine blends, and a Marsanne-based white blend.
