= Adelaida District AVA =

Appellation that designates wine in San Luis Obispo County, California

Coordinates: 35°38′28″N 120°49′45″W

Adelaida District
- Wine region
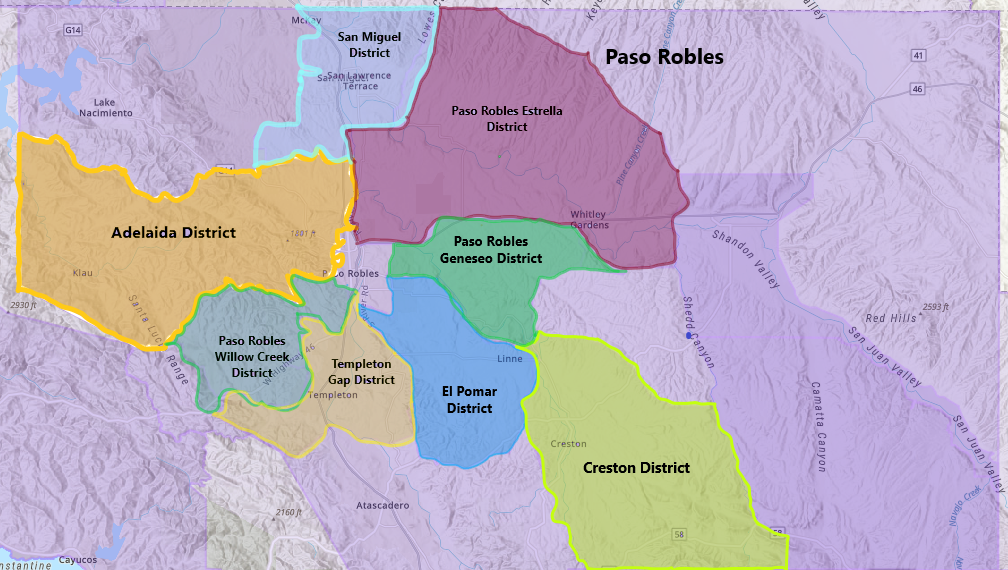
- Type: American Viticultural Area
- Year established: 2014
- Country: United States
- Part of: California, Central Coast AVA, San Luis Obispo County, Paso Robles AVA
- Other regions in California, Central Coast AVA, San Luis Obispo County, Paso Robles AVA: Creston District AVA, El Pomar District AVA, Paso Robles Estrella District AVA, Paso Robles Geneseo District AVA, Paso Robles Highlands District AVA, Paso Robles Willow Creek District AVA, San Juan Creek AVA, San Miguel District AVA, Santa Margarita Ranch AVA, Templeton Gap District AVA
- Growing season: 214 days
- Climate region: Region II–III
- Heat units: 3,000 GDD units
- Precipitation (annual average): 25 inches (640 mm)
- Soil conditions: Shallow, bedrock residual soils and patchy colluvial hillside soils from middle member of Monterey Formation and older rocks; largely calcareous soils
- Total area: 53,000 acres (83 sq mi)
- Size of planted vineyards: 1,300 acres (530 ha)
- No. of vineyards: 23
- Grapes produced: Cabernet Franc, Cabernet Sauvignon, Chardonnay, Grenache Noir, Marsanne, Merlot, Mourvèdre, Pinot Noir, Roussanne, Sauvignon Blanc, Syrah, Viognier, Zinfandel
- No. of wineries: 33

Adelaida District is an American Viticultural Area (AVA) located in San Luis Obispo County, California and within the multi-county Central Coast AVA. It was established as the nation's 216th, the state's 132nd and county's sixth appellation on October 9, 2014 by the Alcohol and Tobacco Tax and Trade Bureau (TTB), Treasury after reviewing the petitions submitted in 2007 by the Paso Robles American Viticultural Area Committee (PRAVAC) to establish 11 new viticultural areas located entirely within the existing 669,253-acre (1,046 sq mi) Paso Robles viticultural area adjacent to the northern boundary of San Luis Obispo County. The proposed viticultural areas are: Adelaida District, Creston District, El Pomar District, Paso Robles Estrella District, Paso Robles Geneseo District, Paso Robles Highlands District, Paso Robles Willow Creek District, San Juan Creek, San Miguel District, Santa Margarita Ranch, and Templeton Gap District.
Adelaida District encompasses approximately 53,342 acres (83 sq mi) with 1,300 acres (530 ha) cultivation under vine. The area lies in the Santa Lucia Range with high mountain slopes grading to foothills with elevations spanning 900 to 2,200 feet (270–670 m) encircling the small town of Adelaida. Its average annual rainfall is 25 inches (640 mm).

The PRAVAC's 59 wine industry members cumulatively own or manage over 10,000 acres (4,000 ha) of cultivated vineyards within Paso Robles AVA's eleven sub-appellations. Wineries located within the Adelaida District are: The Farm Winery, Peachy Canyon Winery, Le Cuvier, Alta Colina, Carmody McKnight Estate Wines, Wild Coyote, Villicana, McPrice Myers, Jacob Toft, Chronic Cellars, Vines on the Marycrest, Nenow Family Wines, Hawks Hill Ranch, Adelaida Cellars, DAOU, Calcareous, Law Estate, Nadeau, Minassian Young, Michael Gill, Villa Creek, Brecon, HammerSky, Oso Libre, Poallilo, Thacher Winery, Whalebone Vineyard, Tablas Creek Vineyard, Halter Ranch, Rangeland, Justin, Kukkula, Dubost, and Starr Ranch.

== Name Evidence ==
The "Adelaida District" name is based on both historical and modern connections of the name "Adelaida" (/ˈæd.əl.eɪd/ ah-del-AY-duh) to the region of the viticultural area. The "District" modifier in the name is a reference to the surrounding, larger Paso Robles viticultural area. The "Adelaida" or "Adelaida District" name historically was used to geographically identify the area within the Adelaida District viticultural area, and the "Adelaida" name was given to a local post office in 1877. In addition, the Adelaida Mining District, established in the late 1800s, is located in the southwest corner of the viticultural area; the Adelaida School was located in the area and remained open until 1964; and the Adelaida Cemetery District, formed in 1940, serves the local rural population. Although some early references use the spelling "Adelaide," "Adelaida" is the currently accepted spelling. The small town of Adelaida and the Adelaida Cemetery, both founded in 1891, are located within the viticultural area, as shown on the USGS Adelaida quadrangle map. According to a 2001 San Luis Obispo County map produced by the Automobile Club of Southern California, Adelaida Road extends westward from the city of Paso Robles into the area. The "Adelaida" name is also used in connection with the Adelaida Planning Area, established by San Luis Obispo County as part of the county's land use plan. TTB notes that the boundary of the Adelaida Planning Area encompasses a larger area that includes the Adelaida District viticultural area within it, as shown on the "Adelaida Rural Land Use Category Map."

== Boundary Evidence ==
The northern portion of the Adelaida District viticultural area boundary follows intermittent streams, straight lines between elevation points and roads. The boundary meanders west to east through mountainous terrain and then descends alongside San Marcos Creek toward the Salinas River. A portion of the northeastern boundary of the Adelaida District viticultural area is shared with the southern boundary of the San Miguel District viticultural area. The eastern portion of the Adelaida District viticultural area boundary is based on the Salinas River and the western boundary of the city of Paso Robles. The boundary separates the foothills and mountains of the viticultural area from the near-flat, urbanized region to the east. The southern portion of the Adelaida District viticultural area boundary follows roads, an intermittent stream, a range line, and a straight line between map points from the western boundary of the city of Paso Robles to a rugged portion of the Santa Lucia Range. The southern boundary of the viticultural area boundary is shared with a portion of the northern boundary of the established York Mountain viticultural area and with the northern boundary of the Paso Robles Willow Creek District viticultural area. The western portion of the Adelaida District viticultural area boundary follows a range line, which runs through the Santa Lucia Range in the area of the Las Tablas Creek watershed. The western portion of the Adelaida District viticultural area boundary is shared with a segment of the Paso Robles viticultural area's western boundary.

== History ==
Adelaida District was originally known as "Las Tablas," after the principal water course through the area which the Spanish had named Arroyo de las Tablas. The area was eventually named Adelaida after the local post office was named Adelaida in 1877, though it took some time for the transition from "Las Tablas" to "Adelaida" to occur. For example, a history of San Luis Obispo County that was first published in 1883 lists several hundred "patrons" of the publication, including their name, residence, business, nativity, date of arrival in the State and County, acres owned, and the post office serving their property. A dozen of these patrons are listed as being served by the Adelaida post office; of these, eleven are shown as residents of Las Tablas while only one is listed as a resident of Adelaida.

Adelaida is a land of great beauty. The blend of mountains, foothills, valleys and streams—the great oaks, the manzanitas, madrones and wild flowers—the deer, the small wildlife, and in general, even the human intervention have all contributed to a picture of harmony. One has to believe that Adelaida, the woman after whom the area was named, was a person of great beauty.

Adelaida's historic role was to provide a route for the Catalan escolte, the soldiers who guarded the Franciscan missions, between the Salinas Valley and the sea. The route also was necessitated by the construction of the Mission San Miguel Arcángel and the need to haul timber from the Santa Lucia Mountain Range. This same route, referred to as the "trail from the coast to San Miguel" on early survey maps, also provided a link between Mission San Miguel and Rancho San Simeon on the Pacific coast, where the Mission kept cattle and horses. Later it also became a path for the illegal trade between English and Yankee sea captains off the coast to the missionaries.
Adelaida, the place, has a lot to offer along with the aesthetics. It is a land known for its abundant rain. Even the earliest settlers were elated by their successes in raising fruits, nuts, hay, grain and livestock. But the times were often difficult for the people mostly because of the isolation.

By the 1870s, Adelaida District was thriving, with six or seven hundred residents. These residents were served by six local schools, two stores and three churches. Adelaida District prospered in that era because of its location along the restricted transportation system of that time. The middle Salinas Valley needed an outlet to the Pacific Ocean with its packet steamers and this outlet to the coast took travelers through Adelaida.

While the earliest plantings of vineyards in the Paso Robles area were by the missionaries of Mission San Miguel, early plantings in Adelaida District appeared in the late 1800s. A history of the County published in 1891 quotes an undated article entitled "Specific Instances," written by Pierre Hypolite Dallidet, on the subject of San Luis Obispo County vineyards. In that article, Mr. Dallidet writes: "Mr. Gillis, near Adelaide, told me three years ago, that his two-year-old vines, Muscats, and wine grapes, bore from ten to thirty pounds each, berries very large and sweet, with a beautiful bloom on them." Mr. Gillis's homestead was located about one mile north of the location of the Adelaida School.

The earliest renown wine grape plantings in the Adelaida area can be traced to Ignacy Jan Paderewski, a noted concert pianist and composer, a founding member of the League of Nations, and later prime minister of Poland. Mr. Paderewski came to the Paso Robles area in 1913 when an attack of rheumatism forced him to cancel his concert tour in California. He found his way to the hot springs at Paso Robles, and the next year he purchased a 2,000-acre (3 sq mi) ranch west of town named Rancho San Ignacio. The ranch is located on what is now Adelaida Road and extended west to within five miles (8.0 km) of the Adelaida Post Office. After serving for Poland in World War I, Paderewski returned to the United States and in March 1922 visited his ranch with Frederic Bioletti, of the University of California, and Horatio F. Stoll, publisher of the California Grape Grower. Mr. Stoll reported in a July 1922 article in California Grape Grower:

With a force of men, he cleared a sunny hillside stretch that was planted this spring with Zinfandels. An acre of Muscats was also set out to please the Madame, who is fond of this luscious table grape, which usually flourishes to greater advantage in a warmer climate.

The original Zinfandel planting was approximately 200 acres (81 ha), and also included some Petite Sirah and Béclan that were processed at the nearby York Mountain Winery. Stoll stated in a 1940 article that the Zinfandel fruit from the vineyard was still wonderful, but by the mid-1950s the vines were dead.

In the 1960s, Dr. Stanley Hoffman revived grape growing in Adelaida District, purchasing a 1,200 acres (1.9 sq mi) property next to the former Paderewski ranch. Dr. Hoffman hired the late André Tchelistcheff to advise him on the vineyard potential of his acreage. Tchelistcheff, often called the dean of California wines, recommended a vineyard, and Hoffman planted Pinot Noir there in 1964. They designed and constructed the Hoffman Mountain Ranch Winery (HMR) from 1972 to 1975, the first modern commercial winery to be built in San Luis Obispo County after Prohibition.

== Terroir ==
=== Topography ===
The Adelaida District viticultural area is generally a mountainous area with steep ridges, frequently oriented in a northwest-to-southeast direction covered with coastal and live oak woodland decorated by lace lichen. The mountainous topography is primarily a result of the faulting and uplift of the South Coast Ranges, particularly the Santa Lucia Range. Elevations range from approximately 900 to 2,200 feet (270–670 m), with most area vineyards planted at the 1,000 to 1,800 feet (300–550 m) elevations. At night, cool air drains off these high, steep ridges into the lower, flatter regions outside the viticultural area, therefore, because of the cool air drainage, frost is not a common occurrence within Adelaida District.

=== Climate ===
The marine influence on the climate in the Adelaida District viticultural area is more modest than in areas to the west outside of the area because the crest of the Santa Lucia Range largely shields the it from the Pacific Ocean. This high-elevation range, located to the west and southwest rarely allows marine air, heavy fog, or strong sea breezes into the viticultural area. The range also inhibits the inland path of the prevailing wet, winter storms off the Pacific Ocean. Although the range blocks most of these storms, the Adelaida District still receives about 25 inches (640 mm) of rain annually. The marine air that moves southward through the Salinas Valley from Monterey Bay typically is limited to altitudes below 1,000 ft (300 m) and cannot reach the high elevations of the viticultural area. The result is clear, fog-free days and cool nights in the Adelaida District viticultural area, which result in a longer growing season and later harvest date than regions with more marine influence. Although strong sea breezes usually do not reach the Adelaida District viticultural area, light mountain and valley breezes result from warm air rising from lower elevations during the day and cool air sinking from the mountain peaks at night. These breezes help to moderate the daily temperature ranges within the viticultural area and make high temperatures extremely rare. The diurnal variance of the Adelaida District can vary between morning lows of 50 °F (10 °C) to afternoon highs of 95 °F (35 °C) in the height of summer. The annual heat summation of the Adelaida District viticultural area averages about 3,000 growing degree day (GDD) units, which is a high Region II or a low Region III in the Winkler climate classification system. The USDA plant hardiness zone is 8b to 9a.

=== Soil ===
The soils of the Adelaida District viticultural area are hillside residual soils, which generally have shallow rooting depths and a relatively high water-holding capacity, but are also well-drained by the subsurface weathered bedrock. The primary parent material of the soils of the viticultural area is the Monterey Formation, which is composed of sedimentary shales, mudstones, and sandstones. Soil textures within the Adelaida District viticultural area are predominantly silty clay loam and clay loam, with some gravelly units. The soils are generally moderately developed Mollisols where surface humus is abundant, Alfisols where more leaching to depth has occurred, and Vertisols where pedogenic clay dominates the texture. The soils are slightly alkaline, with a surface horizon pH of between 7.4 and 8.4 and have low-to-moderate nutrient levels. The modest rooting depths, nutrient levels, and water-holding capacity of the soils promote a moderate amount of stress on grapevines, and low vineyard yields are common within the Adelaida District viticultural area.

== Viticulture ==
Other pioneering Paso Robles wineries were established in the Adelaida area in the 1980s. These include Justin Vineyards and Winery, which planted 72 acres (29 ha) in 1982, Carmody McKnight, which planted its first vineyards in 1985, and Tablas Creek Vineyards, which was established in 1989. Three years after acquiring Adelaida Cellars in 1991, the Van Steenwyk family purchased a 400-acre (162 ha) parcel of the Hoffman Mountain Ranch, including all of the original Pinot Noir plantings. The most widely planted varieties in the Adelaida District are Mourvèdre, Zinfandel, Cabernet Sauvignon, Syrah, Grenache and Merlot.
