= List of churches in the Diocese of Monterey =

This is a list of current and former Roman Catholic churches in the Roman Catholic Diocese of Monterey. The Archdiocese of Monterey includes the counties of Monterey, San Benito, San Luis Obispo, and Santa Cruz.

The churches in the Diocese of Monterey include the Cathedral of San Carlos in Monterey (the oldest stone building and the first cathedral in California) and seven former Spanish Missions: Carmel Mission Basilica; Mission Nuestra Señora de la Soledad; Mission San Antonio de Padua; Mission San Juan Bautista; Mission San Luis Obispo de Tolosa; Mission San Miguel Arcangel; and Mission Santa Cruz.

== Monterey County ==
Name	Image	Location	Description/Notes
Carmel Mission Basilica		3080 Rio Rd, Carmel-By-The-Sea	Former Spanish mission first built in 1797, served as the headquarters of the Alta California missions, 1797–1833; registered as a National Historic Landmark
Cathedral of San Carlos		500 Church St, Monterey	Built 1791–94, it is the oldest continuously operating parish, the oldest stone building in California, the oldest (and smallest) serving cathedral in the United States, along with St. Louis Cathedral in New Orleans, Louisiana, and the only existing building in the original Monterey Presidio
Christ the King		240 Calle Cebu, Salinas	
Holy Trinity		27 S El Camino Real, Greenfield	
Madonna del Sasso		320 E Laurel Dr, Salinas	Parish created in 1959 to serve north Salinas
Mission Nuestra Señora de la Soledad		36641 Fort Romi Rd, Soledad	The 13th Spanish mission in Alta California, founded in 1791; fell into disrepair and left in ruins after secularization; restoration began in 1954 with dedication of new chapel (Our Lady of Solitude) in 1955
Mission San Antonio de Padua		1 Mission Creek Rd, Jolon	The third Spanish mission in Alta California, founded in 1771
Our Lady of Mount Carmel		9 El Caminito Rd, Carmel Valley	Parish dates to 1947 with services first held in a converted barn; church was enlarged and remodeled in 1972 with a new redwood building
Our Lady of Refuge		11140 Preston St, Castroville	
Our Lady of Solitude		235 Main St, Soledad	
Sacred Heart		22 Stone St, Salinas	Parish dates to 1874 as a mission station of Our Lady of Refuge in California; recognized as a separate parish in 1876; church destroyed in 1906 in San Francisco Earthquake; second church destroyed by fire 1926; current Roman-basilica-style church dedicated 1928
St. Angela Merici		362 Lighthouse Ave, Pacific Grove	Founded in 1928 with first church completed in 1929; current church built 1956
St. Francis Xavier		1475 La Salle Ave, Seaside	
St. John the Baptist		504 N 3rd St, King City	
St. Joseph's		1 Railroad Ave, Spreckels	
St. Jude		303 Hillcrest Ave, Marina	
St. Mary of the Nativity		424 Towt St, Salinas	
St. Theodore's		125 S Center St, Gonzales	

== San Benito County ==
Name	Image	Location	Description/Notes
Mission San Juan Bautista		406 2nd St, San Juan Bautista	The 15th Spanish mission in Alta California, founded in 1797; functions now as a parish church
Sacred Heart & St. Benedict's		680 College St, Hollister; 1200 Fairview Rd, Hollister	Sacred Heart parish founded 1877
Immaculate Conception		7290 Airline Hwy, Tres Pinos	

== San Luis Obispo County ==
Name	Image	Location	Description/Notes
Mission San Luis Obispo de Tolosa		751 Palm St, San Luis Obispo	Spanish mission founded in 1772 by Father Junípero Serra
Mission San Miguel Arcangel		775 Mission St, San Miguel	Spanish mission established in 1797, listed as a National Historic Landmark in 2006
Nativity of Our Lady		221 Daly Ave, San Luis Obispo	
St. Elizabeth Ann Seton		2050 Palisades Ave, Los Osos	
St. Francis of Assisi		1711 Beach St, Oceano	Mission chapel governed by St. Patrick's in Arroyo Grande
St. Joseph's		360 Park Ave, Cayucos	
St. Joseph's		298 S Thompson Ave, Nipomo	
St. Patrick's		501 Fair Oaks Ave., Arroyo Grande	
St. Paul the Apostle		800 Bello St, Pismo Beach	
St. Rose of Lima		820 Creston Rd, Paso Robles	Parish traces roots to formation of a Spanish mission in 1795 and a mission church completed in 1821; St. Rose began in 1890 as a mission church under the San Miguel Mission
St. Timothy		962 Piney Way, Morro Bay	
St. William's		6410 Santa Lucia Rd, Atascadero	Parish dates to 1943; current church dedicated in 1969
Santa Margarita de Cortona		22515 H St, Santa Margarita	Parish traces history to the Santa Margarita de Cortona Asistencia established in 1787
Santa Rosa		1174 Main St, Cambria	Parish dates to 1871; current church built 1962-1963

== Santa Cruz County ==
Name	Image	Location	Description/Notes
Christ Child		23230 Summit Rd, Los Gatos	Formed in 1966 as a mission of St. Joseph's in Capitola; became an independent parish in 1983
Holy Cross Church		210 High St, Santa Cruz	Former Mission Santa Cruz
Holy Eucharist		527 Corralitos Rd, Corralitos	
Our Lady Star of the Sea		515 Frederick St, Santa Cruz	
Resurrection		7600 Soquel Dr, Aptos	Parish tracing its history to 1874
St. John's		120 Russell Ave, Felton	Parish dates to 1951
St. Joseph's		435 Monterey Ave, Capitola	Parish dates to 1904
St. Michael's		13005 Pine St, Boulder Creek	
San Agustin		257 Glenwood Drive, Scotts Valley	Parish formed 1969 and church built in 1970
Shrine of St. Joseph		544 W Cliff Dr, Santa Cruz	
