= Rancho Punta de la Concepcion =

Mexican land grant in what is now Santa Barbara County, California

Coordinates: 34.510°N 120.450°W

Rancho Punta de la Concepcion was a 24,992-acre (101.14 km^{2}) Mexican land grant in the northern Santa Ynez Mountains, in present day Santa Barbara County, California. It was granted by Governor Juan Alvarado in 1837, to Anastacio Carrillo. The grant extended along the Pacific coast from Point Arguello south to Cojo Creek, just east of Point Conception.

== History ==
=== Spanish exploration ===
The first European travelers to see Alta California were Spanish explorers of the 1542 Juan Rodríguez Cabrillo maritime expedition, who sailed up the coast from the Baja California Peninsula of colonial New Spain. Cabrillo found a sheltered anchorage on the south side of prominent point of land. In 1602 Spanish explorer Sebastián Vizcaíno sailed along the California coast, and gave the point its current name, Point Conception. Spanish ships associated with the Manila Galleon trade probably made emergency stops along the coast during the next 167 years, but no permanent settlements were established.

The first European land exploration of the upper Spanish Las Californias Province was by the Portolá expedition, led by Gaspar de Portolà. They camped on 26 August 26, 1769 near a creek that reaches the ocean at a sheltered cove previously used by Cabrillo. From a high vantage, they recognized the point beyond as the one named by Vizcaíno. As at nearly all of the coastal creeks in this region, the explorers found a native Chumash village, that subsisted primarily by ocean fishing.

Franciscan missionary Juan Crespi, who accompanied the expedition, noted that the village chief had a lame leg, so the soldiers gave the village the name "Rancheria del Cojo" ("cojo" is Spanish for "lame man"). The cove is still known as Cojo Bay.

The next day, the explorers continued past Point Conception and camped near a native village close to today's Jalama Beach County Park, just south of the boundary of Vandenberg Air Force Base. The soldiers named the village "Rancheria de la Espada" ("espada" is Spanish for "sword") after one of the natives tried to run off with a soldier's sword.

On August 28, the expedition moved on to a campsite at one of the spring-fed creeks reaching the sea from the south side of Point Arguello. On the 29th, the party moved past the point and headed north toward the mouth of the Santa Ynez River. The soldiers found flints for their flintlock firearms near a rocky point, which they named with the Spanish word for flints - "pedernales". Today's Pedernales Point retains that name.

=== Rancho period ===
Anastasio José Carrillo (1788–1850) was the son of José Raimundo Carrillo, and the brother of Carlos Antonio Carrillo and José Antonio Carrillo. Anastasio Carrillo married Concepción Garcia in 1809. Anastasio was a soldier at the Presidio of Santa Barbara and, in 1834, commissioner of Mission San Gabriel Arcángel. He was granted the six square league Rancho Punta de la Concepcion from the secularized holdings of Mission La Purísima Concepción in 1837.

=== Post—statehood ===
With the cession of California to the United States following the Mexican-American War, the 1848 Treaty of Guadalupe Hidalgo provided that the land grants would be honored. As required by the Land Act of 1851, a claim for Rancho Punta de la Concepcion was filed with the Public Land Commission in 1852. The claim was surveyed in 1860, and a patent issued to Carrillo in 1863. Carrillo refused to accept the patent because a tract one half mile square on which Point Concepción light-house stood since 1852 was not included. Carrillo appealed this to the Department of the Interior, and the grant, including the light-house tract, was patented to Anastacio Carrillo in 1880.

In 1851, Carrillo partitioned the rancho into Rancho La Espada on the west, and Rancho El Cojo on the east. Bothe of the names date back to the Portola expedition.

== Rancho La Espada ==
The 16,500-acre (67 km^{2}) Rancho La Espada (the sword), was originally part of Rancho Punta de la Concepcion. In 1851, Carrillo sold Rancho La Espada to Isaac J. Sparks of Rancho Huasna, and 1852 Sparks sold to Gaspar Oreña(1924–1904). In 1854, Gaspar Oreña married his cousin, Antonia María de la Guerra, youngest daughter of José de la Guerra y Noriega, after her husband Cesario Armand Lataillade (1819–1849) died. Oreña acquired Rancho San Julian from the De la Guerras in 1864, as partial payment for money owed him by the De la Guerra siblings. He held on to them until 1867, when he sold them both to Thomas Dibblee. In 1879 the Dibblee-Hollister partnership was dissolved, and Rancho La Espada went to Hollister. In 1883, Captain Robert Sudden acquired the rancho. Robert Sudden, a native of Scotland and former sea captain, came to California during the Gold Rush. He turned businessman and helped organize the Pacific Steamboat Company based in San Francisco.

== Rancho El Cojo ==
The 8,580-acre (34.7 km^{2}) Rancho El Cojo (Ranch of the Lame) was originally part of Rancho Punta de la Concepcion. In 1876, the Rancho was sold to General P.W. Murphy. Patrick Washington Murphy (1840–1901) operated Rancho Atascadero, and the adjacent Rancho Asuncion, and Rancho Santa Margarita. Murphy believed that Cojo would be a major port after the arrival of the Southern Pacific Railroad. But the Southern Pacific railroad did not reach Point Conception until 1899, and Murphy would lose Rancho El Cojo through bank foreclosure. In the 20th century, Rancho El Cojo was owned by the Bixby Ranch Company until 2007, when it was sold with the adjacent Jalama Ranch for close to the asking price of $155 million, for about 25,000 acres. In December 2017, it was purchased by The Nature Conservancy with a $165 million gift from Jack and Laura Dangermond to create the Jack and Laura Dangermond Preserve.
