= San Miguel District AVA =

Appellation that designates wine in San Luis Obispo County, CA

Coordinates: 35°44′04″N 120°37′30″W

San Miguel District
- Wine region
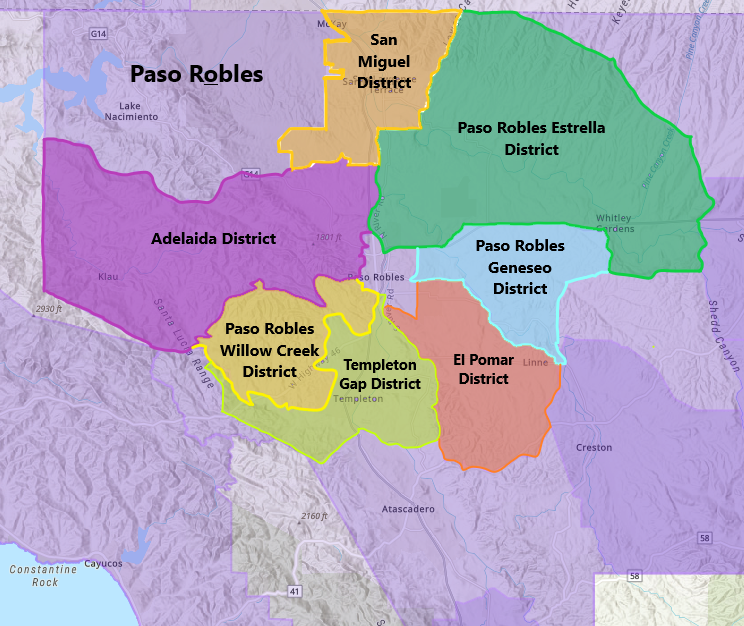
- Type: American Viticultural Area
- Year established: 2014
- Years of wine industry: 236
- Country: United States
- Part of: California, Central Coast AVA, San Luis Obispo County, Paso Robles AVA
- Other regions in California, Central Coast AVA, San Luis Obispo County, Paso Robles AVA: Adelaida District AVA, Creston District AVA, El Pomar District AVA, Paso Robles Estrella District AVA, Paso Robles Geneseo District AVA, Paso Robles Highlands District AVA, Paso Robles Willow Creek District AVA, San Juan Creek AVA, Santa Margarita Ranch AVA, Templeton Gap District AVA
- Growing season: 266 days
- Climate region: Region III
- Heat units: 3600.36 GDD units
- Precipitation (annual average): 11.4 in (290 mm)
- Soil conditions: Deep alluvial soils, with clay, sandy, and gravelly loam textures.
- Total area: 19,086 acres (30 sq mi)
- Size of planted vineyards: 1,945 acres (787 ha)
- No. of vineyards: 11
- Grapes produced: Cabernet Sauvignon, Grenache, Merlot, Mourvèdre, Petite Sirah (Durif), Zinfandel

San Miguel District is an American Viticultural Area (AVA) located in San Luis Obispo (SLO) County, California and lies within the multi-county Central Coast AVA. It was established as the nation's 225^{th}, the state's 141^{st} and the county's fourteenth appellation on October 9, 2014, by the Alcohol and Tobacco Tax and Trade Bureau (TTB), Treasury after reviewing the petitions submitted in 2007 by the Paso Robles American Viticultural Area Committee (PRAVAC) to establish 11 new viticultural areas located entirely within the existing 669,253-acre (1,046 sq mi) Paso Robles viticultural area adjacent to the northern boundary of San Luis Obispo County. The proposed viticultural areas were: Adelaida District, Creston District, El Pomar District, Paso Robles Estrella District, Paso Robles Geneseo District, Paso Robles Highlands District, Paso Robles Willow Creek District, San Juan Creek, San Miguel District, Santa Margarita Ranch, and Templeton Gap District.

As of 2020, San Miguel District encompasses about 19,086 acres (30 sq mi) with approximately 1,945 acres (787 ha) under vine and encircles the small town of San Miguel located alongside Highway 101 ten miles (16 km) north of the city of Paso Robles as shown on the USGS San Miguel and Paso Robles maps and the 2001 Automobile Club of Southern California road map. The AVA is situated at the northernmost portion of the Paso Robles viticultural area along the San Luis Obispo–Monterey County border where the Salinas River flows across northbound toward the Pacific Ocean into Monterey Bay. The viticultural area has a very mild marine influence, receives an average annual precipitation of 11.4 inches (290 mm), and is considered a warm Winkler Region III climate zone. Alluvial fans and well-defined terraces dominate the landscape of the viticultural area, with elevations ranging from approximately 580 to 1,600 feet (180–490 m).

== History ==
"San Miguel" (/sæn mɪˈɡɛl/ san-mi-GEL) is one of the oldest place names in San Luis Obispo County and the State of California. San Miguel District's rich history dates back to 1795, when the Spanish Governor Diego de Borica ordered an expedition to search for a construction site for a mission to be located between Mission San Antonio de Padua, located further north at Monterey, and Mission San Luis Obispo to the south. The expedition reported surveying a large region, from the Nacimiento River to the Arroyo de Santa Ysabel, and for several miles on either side. Eventually, a site was chosen adjacent to the Salinas River. Franciscan Mission San Miguel Arcángel was dedicated on July 25, 1797, and construction began with the help of the local native population, the Salinan tribe. By the end of 1797, an adobe building had been built. San Miguel Arcángel was the sixteenth of the twenty-one missions established in Alta California. The twenty-one missions were located along the coast of California and typically spaced out approximately one day's travel by horseback. Each mission would control the land surrounding it up to the vicinity of the next mission's locale. After several years of continuous building, a fire destroyed most of the Mission buildings in 1806. It was not until 1816 that the stone foundation was laid for the final Mission church. The current San Miguel Mission church was completed in 1818. The lands of the Mission San Miguel extended far and wide from what is now the town of San Miguel, and included essentially all the lands in an east–west area that was south of the lands of Mission San Antonio de Padua and north of the lands of Mission San Luis Obispo. The extent of these lands was given in a report made by Father Juan Cabot in 1827:

From the mission to the beach the land consists almost entirely of mountain ridges... for this reason it is not occupied until it reaches the coast where the mission has a house of adobe... eight hundred cattle, some tame horses and breeding mares are kept at said rancho, which is called San Simeon. In the direction toward the south, all land is occupied, for the mission there maintains all its sheep, besides horses for the guards. There it has Rancho de Santa Isabel, where there is a small vineyard. Other ranchos of the mission in that direction are San Antonio, where barley is planted; Rancho del Paso de Robles, where wheat is sown; and the Rancho de la Asunción.

The town of San Miguel had its origins in 1835, with the construction of the two-story Rios-Caledonia Adobe. This adobe became the headquarters for the Mexican administrator of that time, Ygnacio Coronel. In later years, a small town formed between the adobe and the Mission. By the mid-1800s, the Mission's buildings had become dilapidated. After the Mexican secularization act of 1833, the property was sold in 1846 by the last Alta California governor, Pio Pico, for $600 to Petronillo Rios and William Reed. Mr. Reed used the Mission as a family residence and a store for two years before leaving to join the gold rush. The Mission thereafter was used as a saloon, dance hall, storeroom and living quarters. After 13 years, in 1859, President Buchanan returned the Mission's buildings and adjacent land to the Catholic Church, including 19 acres (7.7 ha) of vineyard and four acres (1.6 ha) of orchard. A turning point in the development of San Miguel was the arrival of the railroad. Myron Angel describes the town in his 1883, "History of San Luis Obispo County," just before the arrival of the railroad, as follows:

About 1876, San Miguel was spoken of as lively – not ironically, but in earnest. W.H. Menton had leased the old mission buildings and busied himself fitting them up to serve as a hotel. Jacob Althano conducted a shoemaker shop in a portion of the same structure. Messrs. Purcell & Patterson possessed an extensive grazing ranch near town. In 1877, the population of San Miguel was reckoned at thirty. There were fifteen buildings, including a schoolhouse, store, stable, two saloons, blacksmith shop, carriage shop, express and post-office…. The monotony of affairs was somewhat shaken in 1881, when the engineers of the Atlantic and Pacific Railway arrived in the vicinity of San Miguel and set their stakes, preliminary to the actual work of building a railroad.

The Southern Pacific Railroad reached San Miguel in 1886, giving ranchers and farmers direct access to the markets to the north. Southern Pacific built a stock corral with scales, a chute leading to cattle railroad cars, and a large warehouse and scale for grain. Homesteading families came to San Miguel, and by 1887, there were 40 licensed businesses. San Miguel was home to the first newspaper in northern San Luis Obispo County. The population of San Miguel in 1891 was between 400 and 500. San Miguel became a thriving community until 1898, when a drought severely impacted agriculture in the area. It was not until World War II that San Miguel boomed once again, when nearby Camp Roberts became home to 45,000 troops. During this time, 4,000 people lived in San Miguel and over 500 new homes were built to accommodate military personnel. After World War II, with the departure of most of the soldiers from Camp Roberts, San Miguel lost a large portion of its economic base. Camp Roberts briefly returned to active status during the Korean War and for a time San Miguel flourished once more. However, the end of the Korean conflict brought the base's activities to a quick halt, and San Miguel recessed again. In 1954, Highway 101 was built around San Miguel. Construction of the freeway required the destruction of the historic schoolhouse and many other buildings in San Miguel.

The earliest vine plantings in the Paso Robles area can be traced back to the missionaries of Mission San Miguel Arcángel. It was on the Mission's lands that the first vines were planted in what is now the Paso Robles viticultural area. By the early 1800s, it is recorded that there was a 19 acres (7.7 ha) vineyard on Mission San Miguel's land. Father Junípero Serra planted more than a thousand vines and produced wine for sacramental purposes and brandy for export. The grape plantings were most likely Mission (Listán Prieto) and Alicante Bouschet. As previously noted, when the Mission lands were returned to the Catholic Church in 1859, they included the vineyard and orchards.

California experienced an immediate viticulture boom, including the Paso Robles region, after the Paris Wine Tasting of 1976 wine competition where Napa and Monterey County vintages were ranked, in both red and white categories, above primer French wines by French oenophiles. Some of the more well-known vineyards in the San Miguel District were planted by Richard Sauret, who was revered throughout the region for his Zinfandel. As a third-generation North SLO County resident, he grew up in viticulture. Richard started tending vineyards in 1941 at the age of six and would go on to be a sought-after vineyard consultant. In the 80s, David Caparone, after extensive research on clonal types and microclimates, decided to pioneer an experimental Nebbiolo vineyard in the San Miguel area. Along with the first Nebbiolo plantings, he planted Sangiovese and Aglianico, also firsts for Paso Robles. Caparone is still in operation today as one of the oldest continuously owned and operated wineries of the Paso Robles region, dating back to 1979.

== Name Evidence ==
The "San Miguel" name has also been used in association with various historical and modern community districts located within the boundary of the viticultural area. Since its early mission days, San Miguel has been the site of a small town, and has been the name of various community districts, including a school district, cemetery district, and supervisorial district. The San Miguel School District, as shown on the 1874 San Luis Obispo County map, still exists today as the "San Miguel Joint Unified School District." The San Miguel Precinct is shown on the 1913 San Luis Obispo County map, and it continues to be the name of a voting precinct in northern San Luis Obispo County. Also, the San Miguel District Cemetery, formed in 1939, serves the community of San Miguel and northern San Luis Obispo County. In addition, in 2000, the San Miguel Community Services District consolidated the government services provided by the San Miguel Fire Protection District, the San Miguel Lighting District, and the San Luis Obispo Waterworks District 1.

== Boundary Evidence ==
The northern portion of the San Miguel District viticultural area boundary is concurrent with a portion of the northern boundary of the Paso Robles viticultural area, and it is also concurrent with the San Luis Obispo–Monterey County line. This portion of the viticultural area's boundary connects the Nacimiento River valley in the west to the Lowes Canyon in the east as it crosses over the Salinas River, mountainous terrain, and canyons. The eastern portion of the boundary of the San Miguel District viticultural area follows San Jacinto Creek south-southwesterly (downstream) through the mountainous terrain surrounding Lowes Canyon to the Estrella River. The boundary then continues southerly (upstream) a short distance along the Estrella River before turning west along a section line and continuing to the Salinas River. The boundary continues south (upstream) along the Salinas River to the southeastern corner of the viticultural area boundary, east of the town of Wellsona. The eastern portion of the boundary closely matches the current and historical San Miguel political boundaries and separates the San Miguel District viticultural area from the Paso Robles Estrella District viticultural area to the east. The southern portion of the San Miguel District viticultural area boundary follows several roads that closely parallel San Marcos Creek and closely align with the boundaries of the San Miguel school, cemetery, and supervisorial districts. In this area, the San Miguel District viticultural area is adjacent to the northeastern portion of the Adelaida District viticultural area. The western portion of the boundary of the San Miguel District viticultural area follows the eastern boundary of the Camp Roberts Military Reservation, which is located to the west of the viticultural area and is unavailable for commercial viticulture. TTB notes that the petition's boundary for this viticultural area originally included a portion of Camp Roberts. However, the boundary was amended at TTB's request to exclude land within Camp Roberts Military Reservation from the viticultural area since it is unavailable for private use.

== Terroir ==
=== Topography ===
Both the Salinas and Estrella Rivers bisect the San Miguel District viticultural area, and they converge near the center of the region. Both rivers have laid down deep alluvial deposits of silts, sands, and gravels, which the rivers have cut through to form a series of well-defined, stepped river terraces. The active floodplains and terraces of the two rivers are prevalent throughout the southeast, central, and northern portions of the San Miguel District while canyons divide several mountains in the north-northeast portion of the viticultural area. The San Miguel District viticultural area includes the lowest elevations within the Paso Robles viticultural area at 580 feet (180 m), where the Salinas River exits San Luis Obispo County as it flows north toward the Pacific Ocean into Monterey Bay. The highest elevation in the San Miguel District viticultural area is an approximately 1,600 feet (490 m) peak located near the northern portion of the boundary, according to the USGS maps. Most vineyards within the San Miguel District viticultural area are located at 640 to 800 feet (200–240 m), with a few vineyards planted at higher elevations.

TTB noted there are no viticultural areas located to the immediate west of the San Miguel District viticultural area within the Camp Roberts Military Reservation, which is unavailable for commercial viticulture. Further west, the terrain ascends to the Santa Lucia Range. In addition, there are no established or proposed viticultural areas directly to the north of the San Miguel District viticultural area in Monterey County, which is outside of the Paso Robles viticultural area. The region to the north, which is part of the Temblor Range, contains steep canyons and mountainous terrain that contrast with the low elevations, river terraces, and footslopes of the viticultural area.

=== Climate ===
The climate of the San Miguel District viticultural area is generally drier, warmer, and windier than most of the larger Paso Robles viticultural area, except in the Paso Robles area's more eastern inland regions. The petition notes that long-term climate data for the community of San Miguel is limited to precipitation information, and all other climate parameter values must be inferred based on the distances from the ocean, orographic influences from the mountains, and other topographic influences, such as elevation. The San Miguel weather station averages 11.4 in (290 mm) of annual precipitation; this low level is largely a function of the rain shadow created by the Santa Lucia Range to the west of the viticultural area. Within the Paso Robles viticultural area, the San Miguel District viticultural area has the second lowest precipitation total, exceeding only the 10.4 in (260 mm) received by the San Juan Creek viticultural area located further inland to the east. According to the petition, the dry conditions make irrigation necessary to establish and maintain most vineyards within the viticultural area. The San Miguel District viticultural area has a Winkler Region III climate, with 3,300 to 3,400 annual GDD unit totals, based on anecdotal evidence from local growers and intermittent weather data. The San Miguel District viticultural area has the third-highest Winkler degree day range among the 11 viticultural areas, trailing only the more inland San Juan Creek and Paso Robles Highlands District viticultural areas, both classified as low Region IV growing areas. Warm temperatures lead to earlier ripening of the grapes than in most other areas of the Paso Robles viticultural area. The USDA plant hardiness zone is 9a.

=== Soils ===
Deep alluvial soils cover the floodplains, terraces, and benches of the San Miguel District viticultural area. Mollisols dominate the soil orders of the San Miguel District viticultural area, but older Alfisols and Vertisols are also present. The deep soils generally provide adequate rooting depths for plants, including grapevines, although some of the older alluvial soils have clay pans, which impede rooting to depth. Small outcrops of granite and Monterey shale, found at around 1,000 ft (300 m) in elevation, have different soils as residual soils forming on bedrock, with shallower rooting depths for the vines.

== Viticulture ==
Some of the well-known vineyards in the San Miguel District were planted in the mid-1970s by Richard Sauret. Numerous wineries have produced highly acclaimed wines from his head-trained, dry-farmed Zinfandel vineyard in the San Miguel District. Caparone Winery was established in 1979 in the San Miguel District and is one of the oldest small artisan wineries in the Paso Robles area. In the 2000s, numerous artisan wineries were established in the San Miguel District, including Pretty-Smith Vineyards and Winery and Rainbows End Winery, while larger producers including Rabbit Ridge and Fetzer's Five Rivers Winery, have built modern, state-of-the-art facilities in the San Miguel District. The San Miguel District encompasses approximately 19,000 acres (30 sq mi) and cultivates about 1,900 acres (770 ha) of vineyards with at least eleven bonded wineries. San Miguel's predominant grape varieties are congruent with the greater Paso Robles viticultural area, with its red wines led by Cabernet Sauvignon and Merlot. Zinfandel historically makes up a significant amount, followed by southern Rhône red varieties such as Grenache, Syrah, and notably Mourvèdre, a variety that does well in warm, dry climates.
