= Oriana Weatherbee Day =

American painter (1838–1886)

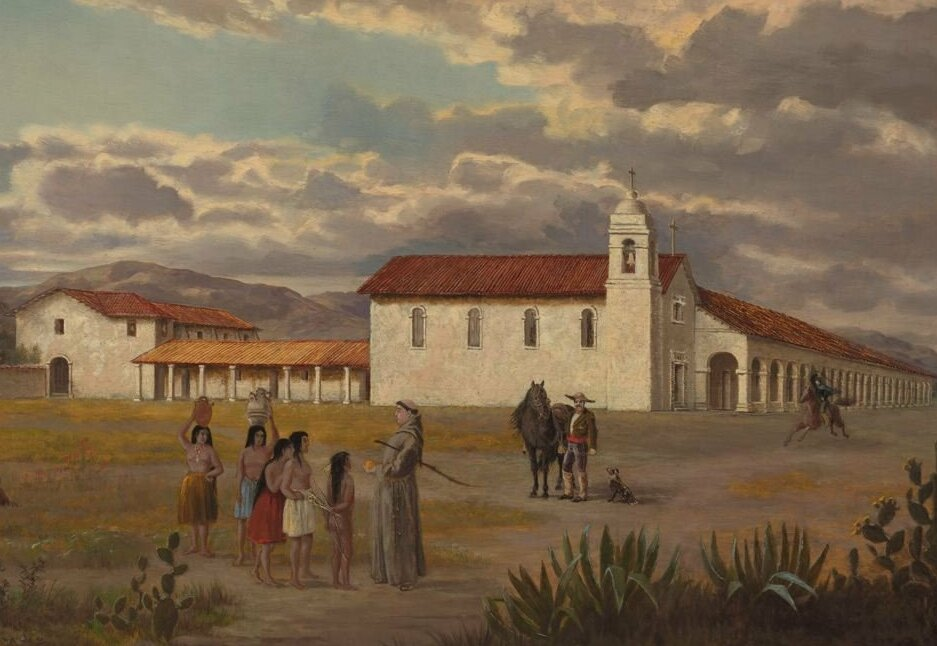
- Mission San Fernando Rey de España by Oriana Day
- Born: September 9, 1838; Marshfield
- Died: May 28, 1886; San Francisco
- Occupation: Painter

Oriana Weatherbee Day (September 9, 1838 – May 28, 1886) was an American painter. She was the second (after Henry Chapman Ford) person to paint all 21 Spanish missions in California.

Oriana Weatherbee Day was born on September 9, 1838 in Marshfield, Massachusetts, one of 11 children of George Henry Weatherbee and Sarah Briggs Clapp Weatherbee. She married Dr. William E. Rice in 1860 and they had a daughter before they divorced. She married John Adams Day, a clerk, in 1868. She worked as an artist in Boston and exhibited three of her works at the Twelfth Massachusetts Charitable Mechanics Association Exhibition in 1874.

In 1877, they relocated to Vallejo, California, where her husband worked at the Mare Island Naval Shipyard. Through their friendship with his son Platon, Day painted a number of portraits and historical scenes of Mariano Vallejo. Originally planned to illustrate a never-completed history of the Spanish missions written by the Vallejos, Day completed her series of mission paintings in 1884.

Oriana Weatherbee Day died on 28 May 1886 in San Francisco.
