= Adelaida, California =

Unincorporated community in California

- Unincorporated community
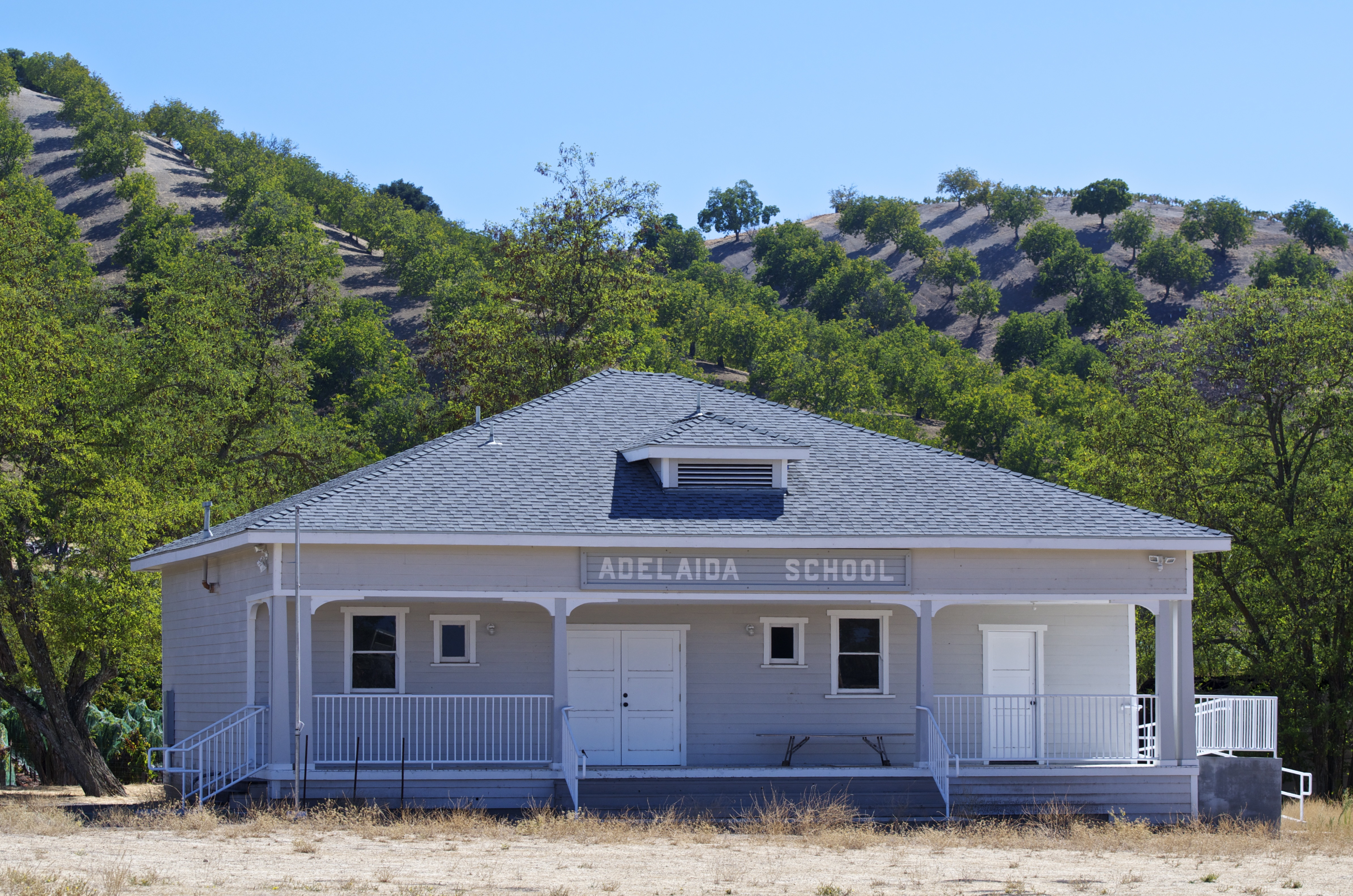
- The restored Adelaida School in 2013

- Location within the state of California Adelaida, California (the United States)
- Coordinates: 35°38′44″N 120°52′25″W
- Country: United States
- State: California
- County: San Luis Obispo
- Elevation: 1,404 ft (428 m)
- Time zone: UTC-8 (Pacific (PST))
  - Summer (DST): UTC-7 (PDT)
- Postal code: 93446
- Area code: 805
- GNIS feature ID: 1660231

Adelaida (pronounced as, and in the 19th century commonly spelled as Adelaide) is an unincorporated community in San Luis Obispo County, California, United States. Adelaida is 10 miles (16 km) west of Paso Robles. The community had a post office from 1877 to 1936.

== History ==
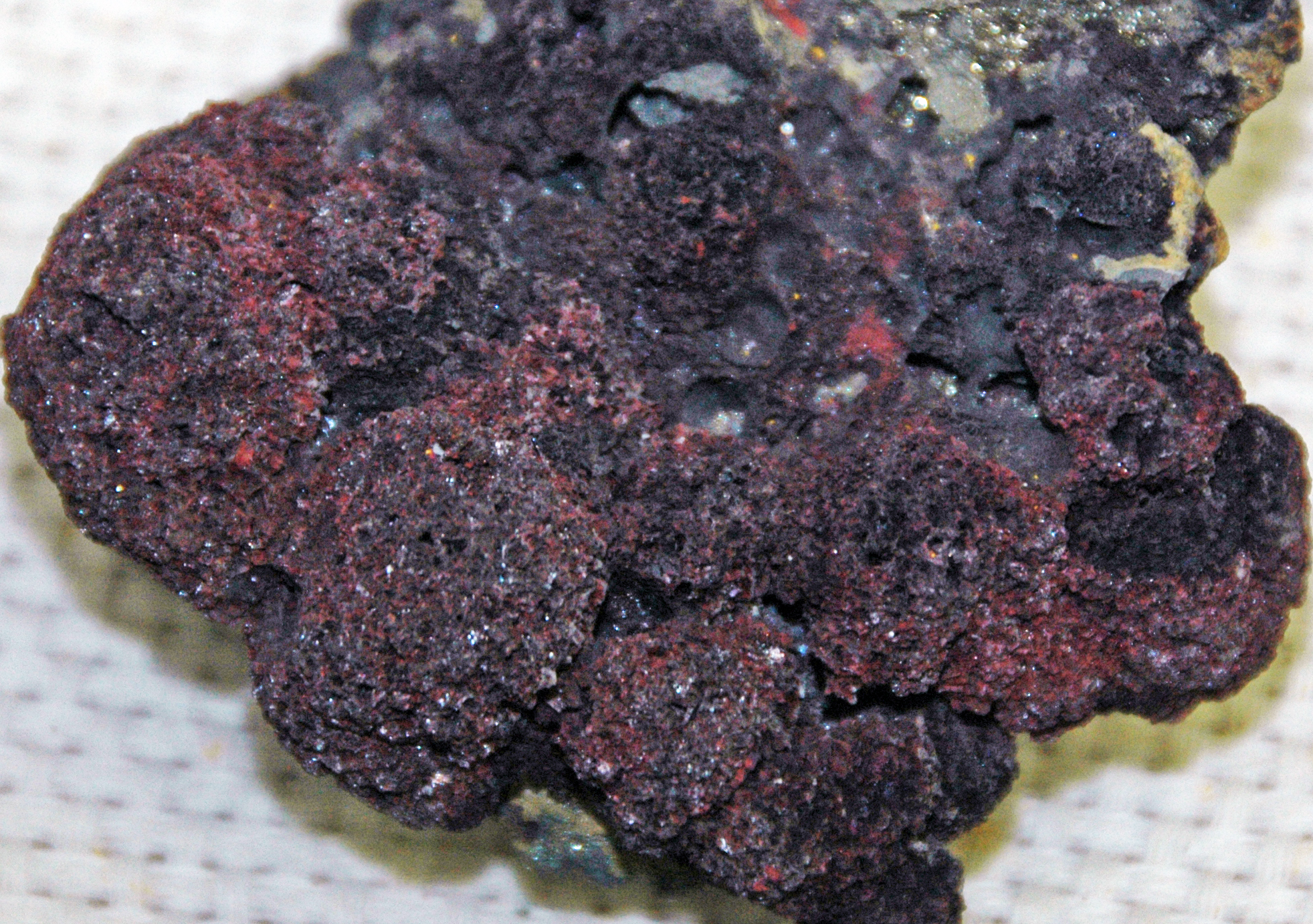
Cinnabar ore specimen from the old Klau Mine

In the 1880s, the population of Adelaida was approximately 500, supported by the prospering Klau and Buena Vista mercury mines. The town boasted a community center, saloon, dance hall, general store, and four schools. The population increased further in 1898 with an influx of Mennonite settlers. The Adelaida School, located near the entrance to the Osgood Ranch on Chimney Rock Road, was built in 1917. It is being restored by the Adelaida Historical Foundation. This school and the Adelaida Road cemetery are all that is left of old Adelaida. The Adelaida School remained open until 1964, the Adelaida Cemetery was founded in 1891, and the Adelaida Cemetery District, which serves the surrounding rural population, was formed in 1940. An Adelaida Mining District was established in the late nineteenth century in what is now the south-western part of the surrounding wine district. Some early references use the spelling "Adelaide", but "Adelaida" is the accepted modern form. Although the quicksilver mines were in operation into the 1970s, most of the local businesses had long since relocated to Paso Robles.

The mines left a long-term contamination problem. The Klau/Buena Vista Mines site, on a ridge of the Santa Lucia Range about 12 miles (19 km) west of Paso Robles, was taken up by the United States Environmental Protection Agency after mercury and other mine waste, including thallium, iron, cobalt and arsenic, washed from the workings into two tributaries of Las Tablas Creek. The creek carries the contamination about 7 miles (11 km) downstream into Lake Nacimiento. The agency settled with the parties it held responsible in 2002 and carried out five emergency actions between 2000 and 2011, removing 120,000 cubic yards (91,747 m^{3}) of polluted material from a drainage channel in 2000 and taking out the mercury retort building and heavily contaminated soil in 2006.

== Geography ==
Adelaida lies in the Santa Lucia Range about 10 miles (16 km) west of Paso Robles, at an elevation of 1,404 feet (428 m), and is reached by Adelaida Road and Chimney Rock Road.

=== Climate ===
Climate data for Adelaida, California, 35.6456°N 120.8736°W, 1,398 feet (426 m)
| Month | Jan | Feb | Mar | Apr | May | Jun | Jul | Aug | Sep | Oct | Nov | Dec | Year |
|---|---|---|---|---|---|---|---|---|---|---|---|---|---|
| Mean daily maximum °F (°C) | 62.8 (17.1) | 63.6 (17.6) | 67.8 (19.9) | 71.5 (21.9) | 78.1 (25.6) | 85.9 (29.9) | 90.5 (32.5) | 91.6 (33.1) | 88.8 (31.6) | 80.8 (27.1) | 69.8 (21.0) | 61.9 (16.6) | 76.1 (24.5) |
| Daily mean °F (°C) | 47.8 (8.8) | 48.8 (9.3) | 51.8 (11.0) | 54.3 (12.4) | 59.6 (15.3) | 65.7 (18.7) | 70.2 (21.2) | 70.4 (21.3) | 67.4 (19.7) | 61.0 (16.1) | 52.3 (11.3) | 46.6 (8.1) | 58.0 (14.4) |
| Mean daily minimum °F (°C) | 32.9 (0.5) | 34.0 (1.1) | 35.7 (2.1) | 37.2 (2.9) | 41.0 (5.0) | 45.4 (7.4) | 49.9 (9.9) | 49.2 (9.6) | 46.1 (7.8) | 41.3 (5.2) | 34.8 (1.6) | 31.3 (−0.4) | 39.9 (4.4) |
| Average precipitation inches (mm) | 5.60 (142) | 5.10 (130) | 3.88 (99) | 1.31 (33) | 0.53 (13) | 0.10 (2.5) | 0.06 (1.5) | 0.01 (0.25) | 0.09 (2.3) | 1.20 (30) | 1.19 (30) | 4.18 (106) | 23.25 (589.55) |
Source: PRISM

== Economy ==
Adelaida gives its name to the Adelaida District American Viticultural Area, established by the Alcohol and Tobacco Tax and Trade Bureau in 2014 as one of eleven districts within the Paso Robles AVA. The district covers about 53,000 acres (21,448 ha) in the westernmost part of the Paso Robles area and contained roughly 1,300 acres (526 ha) of vineyards at the time of its designation. It is characterized by high rolling slopes at elevations between 900 and 2,200 feet (274 and 671 m), a modest marine influence, and average annual precipitation of about 25 inches (635 mm).

== See also ==
- Adelaida Cellars
