= L'Aventure =

California winery

Coordinates: 35°35′24″N 120°44′36″W

- Location: Paso Robles, California, USA
- Appellation: Paso Robles AVA
- Founded: 1998
- First vintage: 1998
- Key people: Stephan Asseo, winemaker
- Cases/yr: 7,500
- Known for: L'Aventure Optimus; L'Aventure Estate Cuvée; L'Aventure Côte à Côte
- Varietals: Cabernet Sauvignon, Syrah, Petit Verdot, Mourvedre, Grenache, Roussanne, Viognier, Grenache Blanc
- Other products: Rosé, Red Blends, White Blend
- Distribution: national
- Tasting: Tasting available by appointment only - 7 days a week; schedule reservation online at www.aventurewine.com. Contact winery directly regarding reservations for groups of 8 or more
- Website: www.aventurewine.com

L'Aventure, or Stephan Vineyards, is a California wine estate producing red wine blends of the Bordeaux and Rhône grape varieties. The winery is located southwest of Paso Robles, California, along the Pacific Coast in the Santa Lucia Mountain range.

== History ==
Stephan Asseo settled in Paso Robles due to its similarities in terroir to the Rhône Valley, founding L'Aventure in 1998.

Following a vision of "Bordeaux meets Rhône in Paso Robles", consistent acclaim and high scores by Robert M. Parker, Jr. have caused sales of L'Aventure wines to rise considerably, and the estate has been informally termed a "Grand Cru of Paso Robles".

Asseo was selected as 2007 Winemaker of the Year of San Luis Obispo County. In 2007 he also appeared in the second series of Oz and James's Big Wine Adventure.

== Production ==
The vineyard area extends 127 acres (51 ha), cultivated with grape varieties of 40% Cabernet Sauvignon, 30% Syrah, 15% Petit Verdot and 15% Mourvèdre as well as portions of Grenache, Roussanne, Viognier and Grenache blanc.

Among the wines produced are the "Paso blends" L'Aventure Optimus and Estate Cuvée, the "Rhône blend" L'Aventure Côte à Côte, and a rosé. The varietal wines produced are Syrah, Cabernet Sauvignon, and Roussanne, and previously Chardonnay and Zinfandel. On average 7,500 cases are produced annually.
