= Santa Margarita de Cortona Asistencia =

18th-century Spanish asistencia in California

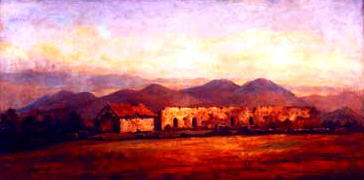
- Misión de Santa Margarita by Henry Chapman Ford, 1881

- Location within California
- Location: Santa Margarita, California
- Coordinates: 35°24′2″N 120°36′44″W
- Name as founded: Asistencia de la Misión de San Luis, Obispo de Tolosa
- English translation: Sub-Mission to the Mission San Luis Obispo de Tolosa
- Patron: Saint Margaret of Lavinio and Cortona, Italy
- Nickname: "San Luis Obispo County's Third Mission"
- Founded: 1787
- Military district: Third
- Native tribe(s) Spanish name(s): Chumash; Obispeño
- Native place name: Trolole
- Governing body: Private entity
- Current use: Unknown

California Historical Landmark
- Reference no.: 364

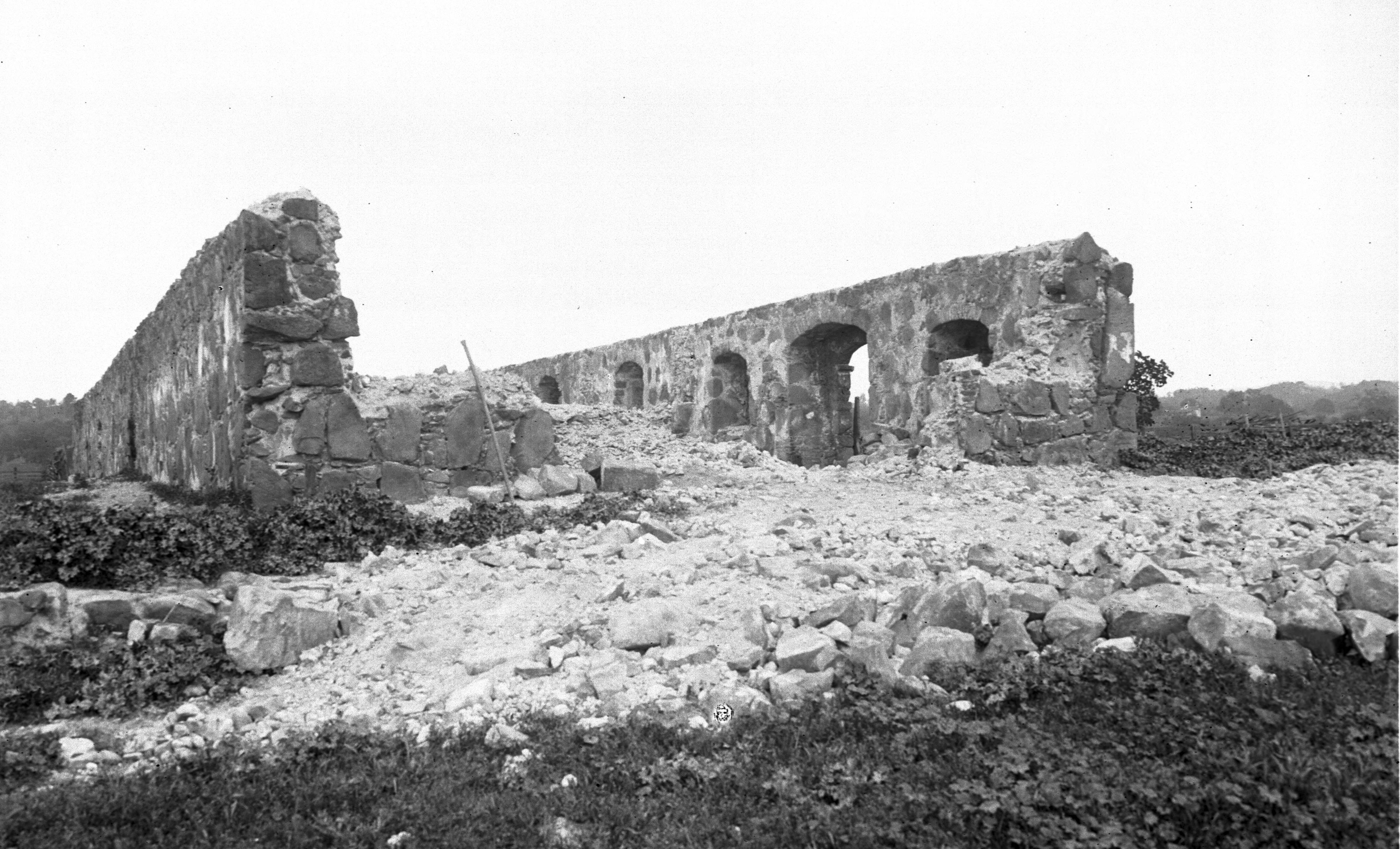
Ruins of Mission Santa Margarita, c. 1906

The Santa Margarita de Cortona Asistencia (/ˈsanta maɾɣaˈɾita ðe koɾˈtona asisˈtenθja/ SAN-ta mar-ga-REE-ta de kor-TO-na a-sis-TEN-sia) was established in 1787 as an asistencia ("sub-mission") to Mission San Luis Obispo de Tolosa, then in the Spanish Las Californias Province. Its site is near the present-day city of Santa Margarita, in San Luis Obispo County, central California.

== History ==
The asistencia compound was located north of the mission and of Cuesta Grade, in the Santa Lucia Mountains, on a site Padre Junípero Serra had previously chosen in 1772. It was named for Saint Margaret of Cortona, an Italian saint. It was established for Indian Reductions of the large number of Salinan (Obispeño) Californian Indians, whose southern homeland included the area. The compound also served as an outpost, chapel, and storehouse.

The adobe and stone chapel building measured 120 by 20 feet (37 by 6 m), with a chapel and eight auxiliary rooms for the use of the majordomo, his servants, and as quarters for visiting priests. One chamber functioned as a granary for storing mission crops. The Mission Indians were engaged in extensive grain cultivation in the fields around it.

When the French privateer Hipólito Bouchard raided coastal colonial Alta California settlements in November 1818, many local residents sought refuge at this inland site.

=== Rancho period ===
The Santa Margarita Asistencia was secularized along with Mission San Luis Obispo in 1835, and suffered the same neglect that many mission properties did after that time. In 1841, the Mexican land grant for Rancho Santa Margarita was issued to Joaquín Estrada. After the two-day American capture of Monterey in 1842, General Pío Pico and General José Castro met at the rancho to discuss strategy. During the 1846 Bear Flag Revolt, the forces of Captain John C. Frémont captured an Indian bearing a message at the rancho, from Jose Jesus Pico, the Mexican Pueblo of San Luis Obispo Justice of the Peace, and ordered his execution. In December of that year Frémont also arrested Estrada and others at the rancho, releasing them only after securing their pledges of service to Frémont.

Estrada sold Rancho Santa Margarita in 1861 to Mary and Martin Murphy Jr., who had come to Alta California with the Stephens-Townsend-Murphy Party in 1844. The Murphys turned over running of the rancho, along with the adjacent Rancho Atascadero and Rancho Asuncion they also owned, to their son Patrick W. Murphy. He later served in the California Assembly and the California State Senate, and was a General in the California National Guard. Murphy erected a barn over the adobe and stone Santa Margarita de Cortona Asistencia to shield it from the elements.

In February 1889, the town of Santa Margarita was incorporated.

=== Present day ===
The Santa Margarita de Cortona Asistencia site is a California Historical Landmark. Several of the original stone walls remain standing, having been incorporated into a ranch barn. The site is on the private property of the Santa Margarita Ranch. Tours are occasionally offered, and the site may also be visited during some public Ranch events.

== See also ==
- List of Spanish missions in California
- California Historical Landmarks in San Luis Obispo County, California
- Mission San Luis Obispo de Tolosa

== Notes ==
=== References ===
- Jones, Terry L.; Klar, Kathryn A., eds. (2007). California Prehistory: Colonization, Culture, and Complexity. Altimira Press, Landham, MD. ISBN 978-0-7591-0872-1.
- Paddison, Joshua, ed. (1999). A World Transformed: Firsthand Accounts of California Before the Gold Rush. Heyday Books, Berkeley, CA. ISBN 1-890771-13-9.
- Ruscin, Terry (1999). Mission Memoirs. Sunbelt Publications, San Diego, CA. ISBN 0-932653-30-8.
- "Mission Days: The Mission Rancho (1775-1841)". Santa Margarita Historical Society. Archived from the original on October 3, 2011.
