= Klau and Buena Vista Mine Superfund site =

The Klau/Buena Vista Mine is a Superfund site located approximately 12 miles west of Paso Robles, San Luis Obispo County, California. It consists of two abandoned mercury mine sites (Klau and Buena Vista) that are located on adjacent properties on a northwest–southeast ridge of the Santa Lucia Range in the California coastal mountains. Mercury mining and ore processing operations occurred at these mines between 1868 and 1970.

Episodic weather events left deep erosional channels throughout the site, thereby releasing mercury-laden sediment, which had contributed significant levels of mercury to downstream Las Tablas Creek and Lake Nacimiento Reservoir.

== History ==
The Klau Mine opened in 1868 and yielded nearly 18,000 flasks of mercury by 1940. Operation of the Buena Vista or Mahoney mine started in 1900 and was active until 1970. The Buena Vista mine produced more than 15,000 flasks of mercury. Buena Vista Mines, Inc. has owned the Buena Vista Mine at least since 1957 and the Klau Mine since at least 1964.

For more than 20 years, acid-contaminated water has drained from the mine into Las Tablas Creek. The California Regional Water Quality Control Board (RWQCB) ordered the Buena Vista Mines, Inc. to stop discharging water or treat the water before it was released into the creek. In 1994, the company constructed an earthen holding pond to capture the mine water and evaporate it. The pond was built from an existing cattle pond, dug 12 feet deep, and designed to hold 1.5 million gallons of acid-contaminated water. In early 1995, San Luis Obispo County experienced heavy rains. Buena Vista Mines inspected the pond on March 24, 1995, and noticed that the water was one inch from the top. Using a water pump, they pumped out 180,000 gallons and lowered the water level about by 18 inches. David Schwartzbart, an engineering geologist for RWQCB, observed the water run down a concrete channel into the Las Tablas Creek. Schwartzbart tested the water and determined that it was highly acidic. After the criminal charges were brought, Buena Vista Mines constructed a second pond that had a 1,200,000-gallon capacity. They also installed a treatment facility that could treat 10,000 gallons of water per day.

In 1999, the RWQCB requested the United States Environmental Protection Agency (EPA) Region 9's Emergency Response Office to assist in preventing the continued release of mercury-laden sediments and other contaminants from the site. Short-term removal work involved site stabilization, which reduced the discharge of acid mine drainage (AMD) and discharge into Las Tablas Creek. In 2000, EPA removed 120,000 cubic yards of contaminated materials from the drainage channel and secured it in an on-site repository to prevent immediate threats to human health and the environment. In 2002, EPA stabilized a sinkhole on site and also stabilized a slope failure on site. In 2006, EPA removed the mercury processing building (retort) and some mercury-laden soils. Contaminated materials stored on site are temporarily capped and will be addressed in the site's long-term cleanup.

== Damage to fishery ==
During an investigation conducted by California Department of Health Services (CDHS) and Agency for Toxic Substances and Disease Registry (ATSDR) in February–March 2006, elevated levels of mercury that pose health hazard were found in six species of fish from Lake Nacimiento. Water analysis has shown that the water is safe to drink and recreate in. However, mercury in the sediment has been converted to methylmercury by organisms living in the sediment and then there has been bioaccumulation of methylmercury in fish in the lake.

== Cleanup efforts ==
EPA has spent about $6 million so far to contain the dangerous runoff from the Klau/Buena Vista. The owner, Buena Vista Mines, Inc., began the effort after years of court battles with the state water board. Shortly after the cleanup started, it became too expensive and the mining company quit. In 1999, RWQCB requested EPA to assist on preventing the release of the mercury-laden sediments to water reservoir. The cleanup is paid for by an EPA Superfund.

== Legal actions ==
It was alleged that the Buena Vista Mines, Inc. intentionally violated the Federal Water Pollution Control Act and the Porter-Cologne Water Quality Control Act by discharging pollutants into Las Tablas Creek which flows into Lake Nacimiento. On January 20, 1998, the Court of Appeal, 2nd District, Division 6, California dismissed the violations on the ground that the mine had established a defense of necessity.
