= Rancho Santa Margarita =

Historic ranch in California

Coordinates: 35.400°N 120.590°W

Rancho Santa Margarita was a 17,735-acre (71.77 km^{2}) Mexican land grant in the Santa Lucia Mountains, in present day San Luis Obispo County, central California.

The rancho was granted by Governor pro tem Manuel Jimeno Casarin in 1841 to Joaquín Estrada. The grant encompassed present day Santa Margarita. It remains an active ranch.

== History ==
Joaquín Tomas Estrada (1815–1893), the son of José Raimundo Estrada and Josefa Vallejo de Alvarado, was born in Spanish colonial Monterey, Alta California. Originally part of the northern lands of Mission San Luis Obispo de Tolosa, the four square league Rancho Santa Margarita was granted to Estrada in 1841. At the time, his older half brother Juan Bautista Alvarado was Governor of Alta California for independent México. Joaquín Estrada and his wife Maria de Jesus made their home at the adobe ranch headquarters. His brother Pedro Estrada was granted the adjacent Rancho Asuncion in 1845 after the Mexican secularization act of 1833. Joaquín Estrada was elected to the post-statehood first San Luis Obispo County Board of Supervisors in 1852, and served as County Treasurer in 1853–1854.

With the Mexican Cession of California to the United States following the Mexican–American War, the 1848 Treaty of Guadalupe Hidalgo provided that the land grants would be honored. As required by the Land Act of 1851, a claim for Rancho Santa Margarita was filed with the Public Land Commission in 1852, and the grant was patented to Joaquín Estrada in 1861.

In 1861, Estrada sold the rancho to Martin Murphy Jr. and his wife Mary Bulger Murphy of Sunnyvale, who had come to California with the Stephens-Townsend-Murphy Party in 1844. The Murphys turned over running of the ranch to their son Patrick W. Murphy, who was a politician and a brigadier general in the California National Guard. Patrick W. Murphy operated Rancho Santa Margarita, and the adjacent Rancho Atascadero, and Rancho Asuncion, altogether comprising about 61,000 acres (247 km^{2}) from his Rancho Santa Margarita headquarters. In 1876, Murphy bought the 9,000 acres (36 km^{2}) Rancho Punta de la Concepcion.

In 1889, Patrick W. Murphy enticed the Southern Pacific Railroad to Rancho Santa Margarita by selling them land near the ranch house. By 1890 Patrick W. Murphy's efforts to entice further land buyers had largely failed, and Murphy died in 1901. In 1904, the Murphy family sold Rancho Santa Margarita to the three Reis brothers – Ferdinand, Christian and Gustav, all German emigrants who made their fortune in the California Gold Rush.

== Historic sites of the Rancho ==
- Santa Margarita de Cortona Asistencia – sub-mission established in 1782, on land that later was within the rancho

== See also ==
- Ranchos of San Luis Obispo County, California
- List of Ranchos of California
- Ranchos of California
