= Adelaida Cellars =

Winery in California, United States

- Location: Paso Robles, California
- Coordinates: 35.6453°N 120.8024°W
- Appellation: Paso Robles AVA
- Founded: 1981
- Key people: Jeremy Weintraub; John Munch; Terry Culton
- Cases/yr: 15,000
- Varietals: Cabernet Sauvignon, Pinot noir, Chardonnay, Syrah, Zinfandel, Rhone, Bordeaux
- Website: https://www.adelaida.com/

Adelaida Vineyards & Winery is a family-owned and operated winery that was named after a 19th-century settlement in the mountains of west Paso Robles, California. Situated at 2,000 feet (610 m) of elevation and 14 miles (23 km) from the Pacific Ocean, the terrain of the Adelaida, California district is marked by ancient calcareous soils, diurnal temperature variations of nearly 50 °F (10 °C), and warm, dry growing seasons. Adelaida Vineyards & Winery produces Cabernet Sauvignon, Pinot noir, Syrah, Rhône blends, Zinfandel and other wines from the Paso Robles AVA.

== History ==
Longtime residents of southern California, the Van Steenwyk family purchased Hilltop Ranch along Adelaida Road in the late 1970s as an investment. The steep, contouring slopes are home to several hundred acres of walnut trees and an abundance of fauna. The family soon acquired nearby Viking Ranch, adding more orchards to the existing walnut-growing business.

walnut trees on Viking Ranch

Meanwhile, John Munch began making wine under the Adelaida Cellars label in 1981 with grapes purchased from local growers. He operated the winery from leased space until entering an agreement with the Van Steenwyks in 1991 that established him as the winemaker-managing partner. Committed to producing wine exclusively from estate vineyards, the Van Steenwyks constructed a winemaking facility on Hilltop Ranch and began developing vineyard property. Viking Ranch was planted in 1991 with 10 acres (40,000 m^{2}) of Cabernet Sauvignon and Syrah. Viking Estate Vineyard — a steep, uniform ridge sheltered by two higher, neighboring ridges — now contains 15 acres (6.1 ha) of Cabernet Sauvignon and 1.5 acres (0.61 ha) of Syrah. Vines were planted in a densely spaced pattern at 1,500–1,700 feet (460–520 m) above sea level with a south-facing aspect to the sun.

In 1994, the Van Steenwyks purchased part of nearby Hoffman Mountain Ranch, including most of the vineyards developed by Dr. Stanley Hoffman in 1964. The planting was named HMR Estate Vineyard to honor its noble beginnings, and is situation 0.5 miles (0.80 km) west of Viking at elevations of 1,600–1,700 feet (490–520 m). HMR also contains 7 acres (2.8 ha) of Chardonnay dating back to 1973. In a 1979 Paris wine competition, the 1975 Hoffman Mountain Ranch Pinot noir placed third in the world in a comparative tasting of 330 wines from 33 countries. In 1999, the Van Steenwyks bought out John Munch to become the sole proprietors of Adelaida Cellars.

Viking Estate Vineyard

Setting their sights on complete vineyard control,

the family continued to develop other properties after Viking and HMR.

Bobcat Crossing Estate Vineyard (1,600–2,000 feet (490–610 m) in elevation) was developed in 2002 with three Portuguese grape varieties (Touriga Nacional, Tinta Cão and Sousao) to make a port-style wine as well as Muscat blanc for an ice wine.

Situated between 1,800–1,900 feet (550–580 m) of elevation on the ridgeline above HMR, Anna's Estate Vineyard was planted with 18 acres (7.3 ha) of Syrah in 2002-03 and named after Elizabeth Van Steenwyk's grandmother. The vineyard resulted from a cooperative experiment with California Polytechnic State University, and is composed of numerous clone and rootstock combination. Its 18 acres (7.3 ha) are subdivided into six defined blocks of limestone-tolerant ENTAV Syrah clones. Nine more acres of Rhône varieties were added in 2005–06.

Michael's Estate Vineyard is an 18-acre (7.3 ha) parcel of dry-farmed, head-trained Heritage clone Zinfandel. Ranging from 1,600–2,000 feet (490–610 m) feet above sea level and planted on a smoothly contoured knob between HMR and Viking, the vineyard was propagated from clippings made at two of Paso Robles' oldest Zinfandel vineyards: Will-Pete and Martinelli.

Finally, Viking Ridge Estate Vineyard was completed in 2007 on a 1,900-foot (580 m) ridge across a ravine from Viking Estate Vineyard. This 9-acre (3.6 ha) site is planted with Cabernet Sauvignon, Cabernet Franc, Malbec and Petit Verdot.

Winemaker Jeremy Weintraub joined Adelaida in 2012. Weintraub has multiple 95+ scores from Robert Parker, Antonio Galloni, and The Wine Spectator. He formerly worked as winemaker for Seavey Vineyard.

Former winemaker Terry Culton, now making his own wines at Culton Wine Company, was hired in 2003 after a tenure at Calera Wine Company. His wines have been favorably reviewed by Bon Appetit, Connoisseurs' Guide, Decanter, Santé, Wine Advocate, Wine Enthusiast, Wine Spectator and Wine & Spirits.

== Soil ==
Quite rare in California, the underlying limestone of the Adelaida district is part of a narrow coastal strip that extends from San Diego to Monterey. Tectonic plate movement over the past 20 million years has pushed these deposits north from their origin near modern-day Mexico. Geologists believe they were spawned in the underwater canyons of warm, shallow seas during the Upper Cretaceous period.

The shallow, well-drained soils associated with these formations (the Linné-Colado series) were formed from weathered calcareous shale and sandstone. These soils lie on hills and mountains with slopes up to 75% and pH ranges of 7.0 to 8.5. The native vegetation is oak woodland. The settlers who cleared the area farmed only the lower valleys because of the rocky higher elevations.

== Vineyards ==
The wines of Adelaida originate in a handful of estate vineyards: HMR, Viking, Bobcat Crossing, Anna's, Michael's, and Viking. Blanketing deep layers of chalk-white shale, the lean calcareous soils control vine vigor to engender small concentrated grapes while a cool afternoon marine layer and low overnight temperatures provide essential grape acidity.

== Wines ==
Adelaida is a Rhone Ranger producer that also makes several varieties beyond the Rhône varieties. These include, Chardonnay, Cabernet Sauvignon, Gamay noir, Grenache, Mourvedre, Nebbiolo, Pinot noir, Roussanne, Syrah, Viognier, Zinfandel, and other wines from a handful of estate vineyards.
