= Henry Ford (illustrator) =

American illustrator

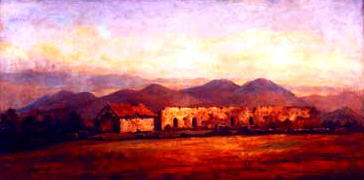
Misión de Santa Margarita by Henry Chapman Ford, 1881

Henry Chapman Ford (1828–1894) was an American illustrator. His depictions of California's missions were partially responsible for the revival of interest in the state's Spanish heritage.

== Early life and education ==
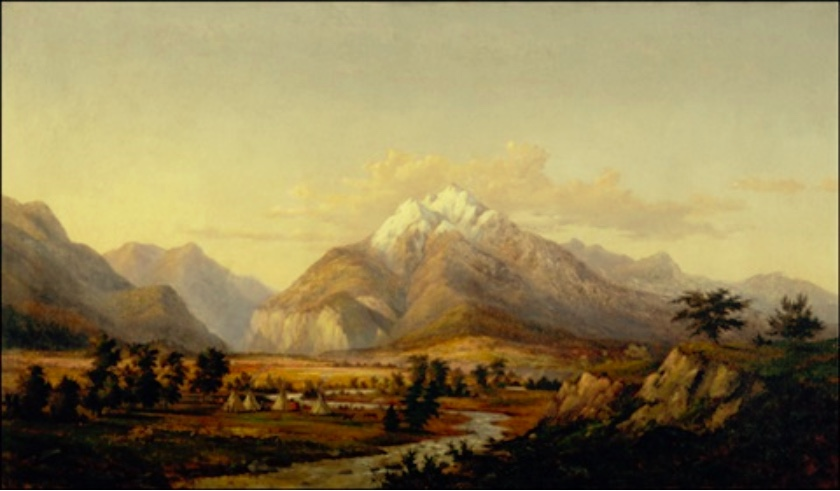
Henry Chapman Ford, Ute camp, by 1894

Ford was born in Livonia, New York. He studied art in Paris and Florence late in the 1850s. During the Civil War, he was a soldier assigned to prepare illustrations of interest to the military. After the war, he moved to Chicago, Illinois, where, in 1871, his studio was destroyed in the "Great Fire".

== Work in California ==
In 1875, he settled in Santa Barbara, California, where he would live out his days. Ford traveled by horse and buggy to each of the twenty-one Spanish missions in California, where he created a historically important portfolio of watercolors, oils, and etchings. His depictions of the missions were (in part) responsible for the revival of interest in the state's Spanish heritage, and indirectly for the restoration of the missions themselves. In 1883, Ford published his Etchings of the Franciscan Missions of California, and exhibited his works at the 1893 Chicago World's Fair. The hallmarks of Ford's images are exquisite brushwork and tonal mastery in all mediums, which make his works highly prized. Ford died in 1894 in Santa Barbara.
