= Rancho Atascadero =

Mexican land grant in California

Coordinates: 35.490°N 120.650°W

Rancho Atascadero was a 4,348-acre (17.60 km^{2}) Mexican land grant in present-day San Luis Obispo County, California.

It was granted in 1842 by Governor Juan Alvarado to Trifon Garcia. The grant extended along the Salinas River and encompassed present-day Atascadero.

== History ==
The one square league grant was from the secularized holdings of Mission San Miguel Arcángel. Trifon Garcia was a son of Ynocente Garcia, who was administrator at Mission San Miguel.

With the cession of California to the United States following the Mexican-American War, the 1848 Treaty of Guadalupe Hidalgo provided that the land grants would be honored. As required by the Land Act of 1851, a claim for Rancho Atascadero was filed with the Public Land Commission in 1852, and the grant was patented to Henry Haight in 1860. A second claim was filed by Maria Antonia Ortega in 1853, but was rejected by the Commission due to lack of evidence of a grant.

The rancho was sold in 1864 to Martin Murphy Jr. (1807–1884) and his wife Mary Bulger Murphy (d.1892) of Sunnyvale, who had come to California with the Stephens-Townsend-Murphy Party in 1844. The Murphys turned over running of the rancho to their son Patrick Murphy, who was a General in the California National Guard. Patrick Washington Murphy (1840–1901) operated Rancho Atascadero, and the adjacent Rancho Asuncion, and Rancho Santa Margarita, altogether comprising about 61,000 acres (247 km^{2}), from his Rancho Santa Margarita headquarters.

In 1912, Edward Gardner Lewis, a successful magazine publisher, bought Rancho Atascadero from J.H. Henry. Lewis founded the utopian, planned community of Atascadero in 1913.

== See also ==
- Ranchos of San Luis Obispo County, California
- List of Ranchos of California
