= Tablas Creek Vineyard =

Winery in Paso Robles, California

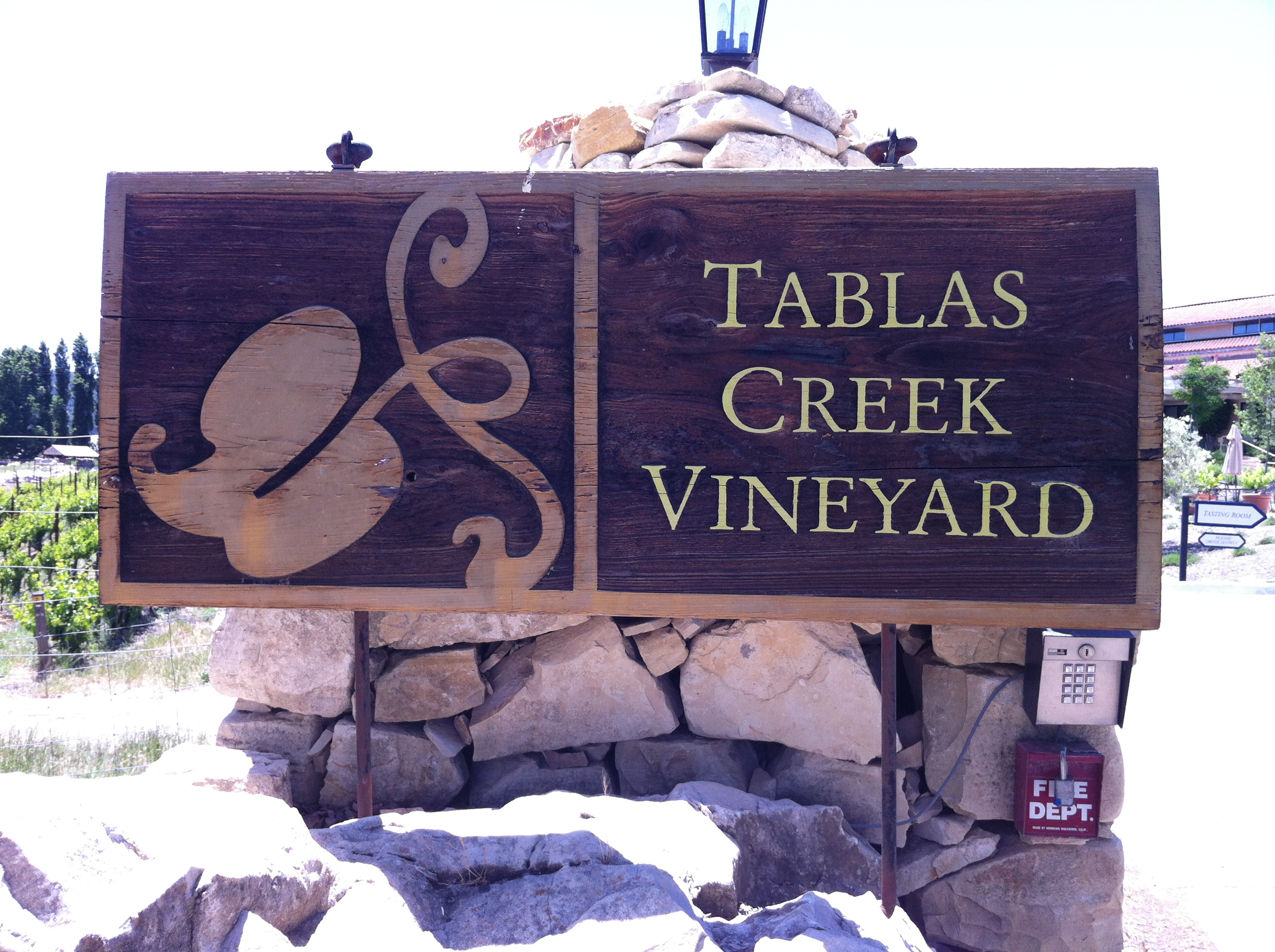
- Location: Paso Robles, USA
- Coordinates: 35.6366°N 120.8592°W
- Appellation: Paso Robles AVA
- First vintage: 1997
- Key people: Jean-Pierre Perrin; François Perrin; Robert Haas; Jason Haas; Pierre Perrin; Neil Collins
- Known for: Esprit de Beaucastel; Côtes de Tablas
- Varietals: Roussanne, Grenache blanc, Syrah, Grenache, Mourvedre, Counoise, Viognier, Vermentino, Tannat, Picpoul blanc
- Other products: Rosé, Vin de Paille
- Distribution: limited
- Website: www.tablascreek.com

Tablas Creek Vineyard is a California wine estate producing various Rhône-style blends and varietal wine. The winery is located in the Adelaida district west of Paso Robles in the Santa Lucia Mountains, within the Paso Robles AVA. It is an exemplar of the GSM blend (Southern Rhône), and has been influential in popularizing it in California.

In 2020, Tablas Creek Vineyard became the first certified regenerative organic winery in the United States after being certified organic in 2003.

== History ==
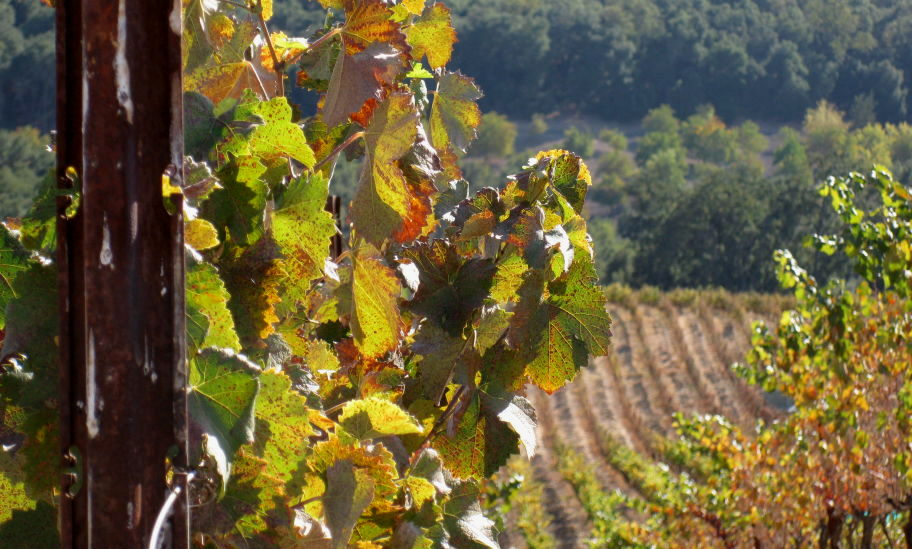
Tablas Creek Vineyard plantings

Described as the sibling winery of southern Rhône estate Château de Beaucastel in Châteauneuf du Pape, Tablas Creek Vineyard was founded in 1990 by Jean-Pierre and François Perrin of the Perrin family, proprietors of Beaucastel since the early 20th century, and Robert Haas, an importer and the founder of Vineyard Brands. Having searched for the appropriate terroir since 1985, in 1989 the Perrins and Haas chose the site, a former alfalfa farm on top of a Late Cretaceous seabed, for its soil pH and limestone base similarities to Beaucastel.

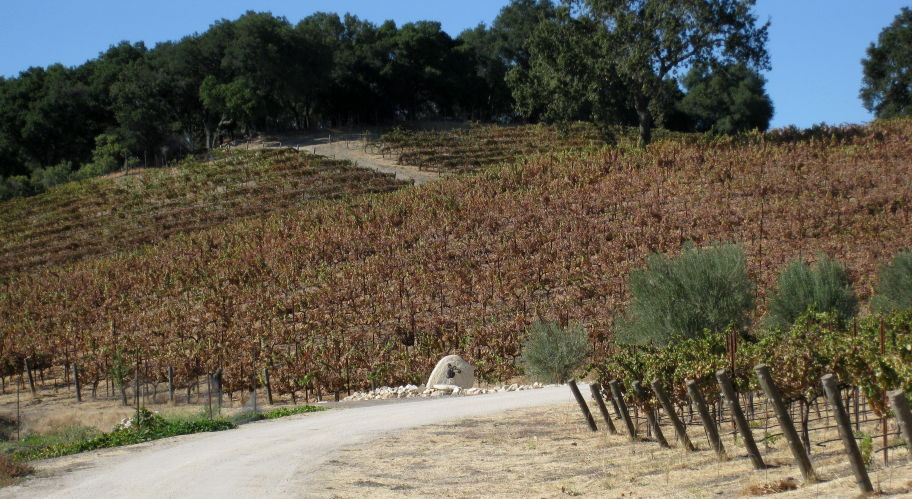
Tablas Creek Vineyard view

With an aim to produce Rhône-style wines made by organic principles, vines were imported from the Beaucastel vineyards, both to supply varieties previously unavailable in California such as Counoise and Grenache blanc, and in order to ensure the disease-free provenance of the remaining varieties. Beginning in 1990, the vines were quarantined by the United States Department of Agriculture. The first clones were released in 1992, with additional clones released over the next two decades. Planting of these French clones began in 1994. Previously, experiments had been made with American material planted in selected soils beginning in 1992. Wines were produced under the names Adelaida Hills and Tablas Hills between 1994 and 1996, with the first Tablas Creek Vineyard wines produced in 1997. Although all grapes were grown on site, the launch of the Tablas Creek Vineyard label was delayed until the majority of the wine was produced from French vines.

Pierre Perrin estimates that the Tablas Creek estate with its nursery project has "probably been one of the most expensive vineyards in the world to develop". In 2009 it was reported that 50% of the sales of the Tablas Creek production takes place at the estate or through their wine club.

== Production ==
The Tablas Creek estate extends 120 acres (49 ha), with approximately 100 acres (40 ha) under vine, situated at an average elevation of 1,500 feet (460 m). The estate annually produces ca. 16,000 cases (1,400 hL) of wine.

== Nursery ==
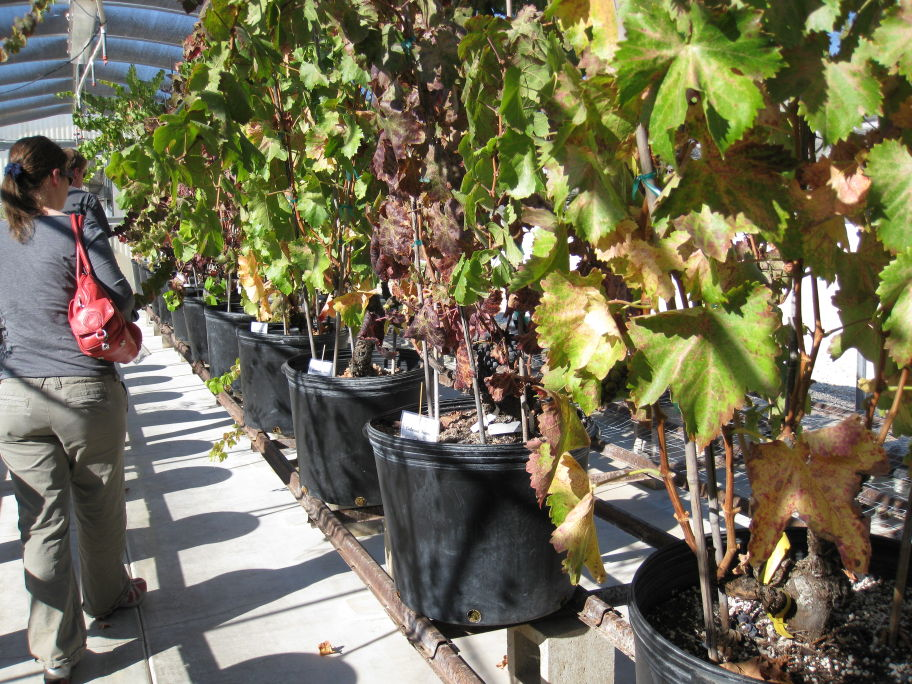
The grape vine nursery of Tablas Creek Vineyard

Since the 1990 program to propagate grape vine clones from the Beaucastel vineyards, followed by the three-year U.S. Department of Agriculture quarantine, the vine nursery was finally established in 1992. Between 1993 and 2003, the estate produced over 1,000,000 vine grafts on site, and the sale of plant cuttings to other wine producers remains a part of Tablas Creek's business, although since 2004 Tablas Creek has contracted with NovaVine Nursery in Santa Rosa, California to produce and market their vine material.
