= Santa Margarita, California =

- Unincorporated community census-designated place
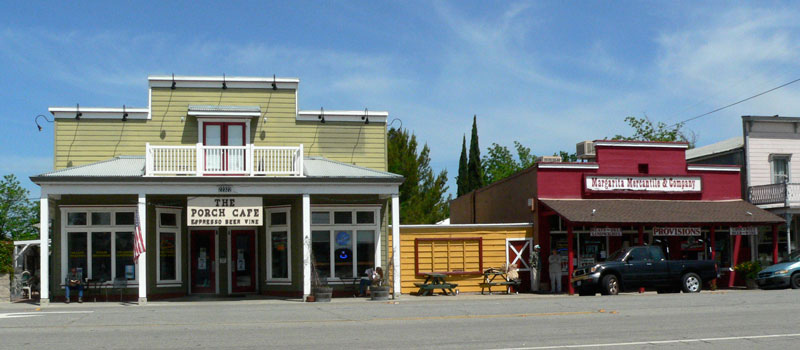
- Downtown Santa Margarita, 2011

- Location within the State of California
- Coordinates: 35°23′22″N 120°36′29″W
- Country: United States
- State: California
- County: San Luis Obispo

Area
  - Total: 0.517 sq mi (1.340 km^{2})
  - Land: 0.517 sq mi (1.340 km^{2})
  - Water: 0 sq mi (0 km^{2}) 0%
- Elevation: 1,014 ft (309 m)

Population (2020)
  - Total: 1,291
  - Density: 2,495/sq mi (963.4/km^{2})
- Time zone: UTC-8 (Pacific (PST))
  - Summer (DST): UTC-7 (PDT)
- ZIP codes: 93453
- Area code: 805
- GNIS feature ID: 2583128

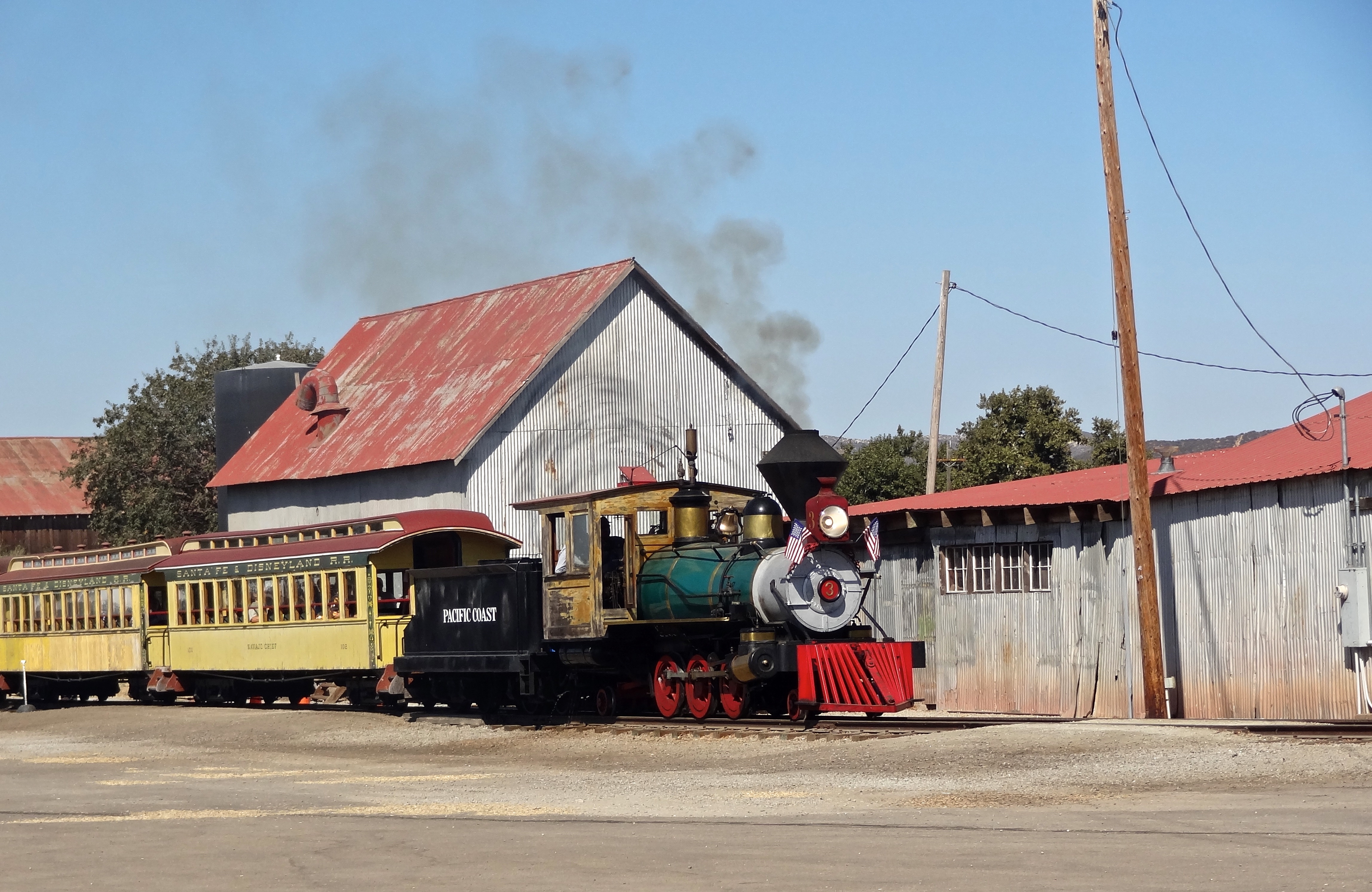
The narrow-gauge steam train is a popular attraction at the historic Santa Margarita Ranch.

Santa Margarita (Spanish for "St. Margaret") is an unincorporated community located in San Luis Obispo County, California, United States. It was founded in 1889 near Cuesta Peak and San Luis Obispo along today's State Route 58. The town's name comes from the Mexican Alta California land grant of Rancho Santa Margarita. It is home to the Santa Margarita de Cortona Asistencia site. For statistical purposes, the United States Census Bureau has defined Santa Margarita as a census-designated place (CDP). The population was 1,291 at the 2020 census.

== History ==
Santa Margarita was named for the 13th-century Saint Margaret of Cortona (1247–1297).

Santa Margarita Valley, with its year-round running streams and abundant acorns, was a meeting place for northern Chumash and southern Salinan around 6500 BCE. The de Anza Expedition traversed the Cuesta Grade into the valley in 1776. After Fr. Junipero Serra founded the Mission San Luis Obispo de Tolosa, he realized that an assistancia (sub-mission) was needed. The Santa Margarita de Cortona Asistencia was founded circa 1775, and was named for the Italian Saint, Santa Margarita de Cortona. The Spanish El Camino Real trail past it is the city's present-day main street.

In 1841, following Mexico's 1822 independence and 1830s mission secularization, Joaquin Estrada became the owner of the Rancho Santa Margarita. Estrada was famed for his "Rancho Hospitality" with rodeos, BBQs and fiestas. After downturns in the economy and personal debts, Estrada sold the Rancho to the Martin Murphy Jr. family in 1860.

Patrick W. Murphy worked to restore the Rancho to a working agricultural ranch. On April 20, 1889, the Southern Pacific Railroad reached Santa Margarita from Templeton. A "Grand Auction" was held to sell lots for the new town of Santa Margarita along the El Camino Real. While construction down the Cuesta Grade took place, the railroad terminus was in Santa Margarita. This created a boom time in the community. All freight had to be loaded for stage transportation up and down the Cuesta Grade. Town boasted a hotel, restaurants, taverns, blacksmiths, and ice cream parlors. Once the "gap" was closed from Santa Margarita to San Luis Obispo in 1894 the town grew quiet.

Margarita Town saw a renaissance in the roaring 1920s. The El Camino Real was one of the primary roads for seeing California. The town offered a motor inn, hotel, six gas stations, garages, pool halls, restaurants, fraternal organizations, taverns and a baseball team.

The Depression hit the town and surrounding areas hard. The War Department took land from local farmers to build a reservoir on the Salinas River which created Santa Margarita Lake to provide water for Camp San Luis. The war ended before the work was completed and Santa Margarita Lake is now a County Recreation Area.

After Highway 101 bypassed Santa Margarita in 1956, the town was quiet once again. Today, it's a small town of 1,300 people. It is a quiet artist and family community.

== Geography ==
Located in the foothills of the Santa Lucia Mountains, Santa Margarita is one of the most rural communities in San Luis Obispo County. Santa Margarita Lake, a major water source for San Luis Obispo, is located several miles southeast of the town on the headwaters of the Salinas River. It is served by ZIP code 93453 and area code 805.

According to the United States Census Bureau, the CDP covers an area of 0.5 square miles (1.3 km^{2}), all land.

== Demographics ==
Historical population
Census	Pop.	Note	%±
2010	1,259		—
2020	1,291		2.5%
U.S. Decennial Census; 1850–1870 1880-1890; 1900 1910 1920; 1930 1940 1950; 1960 1970 1980; 1990 2000 2010

=== 2020 census ===
As of the 2020 census, Santa Margarita had a population of 1,291 and a population density of 2,497.1 inhabitants per square mile (964.1/km^{2}). The age distribution was 286 people (22.2%) under the age of 18, 73 people (5.7%) aged 18 to 24, 347 people (26.9%) aged 25 to 44, 373 people (28.9%) aged 45 to 64, and 212 people (16.4%) who were 65 years of age or older. The median age was 41.1 years. For every 100 females, there were 97.1 males, and for every 100 females age 18 and over, there were 98.6 males age 18 and over.

The census reported that the whole population lived in households. 0.0% of residents lived in urban areas, while 100.0% lived in rural areas.

There were 538 households, of which 149 (27.7%) had children under the age of 18 living in them. Of all households, 271 (50.4%) were married-couple households, 36 (6.7%) were cohabiting couple households, 126 (23.4%) had a female householder with no spouse or partner present, and 105 (19.5%) had a male householder with no spouse or partner present. 138 households (25.7%) were one person households, and 54 (10.0%) were one person aged 65 or older. The average household size was 2.4. There were 352 families (65.4% of all households).

There were 564 housing units at an average density of 1,090.9 units per square mile (421.2 units/km^{2}), of which 538 (95.4%) were occupied. Of occupied units, 380 (70.6%) were owner-occupied and 158 (29.4%) were occupied by renters. 4.6% of housing units were vacant, the homeowner vacancy rate was 1.3%, and the rental vacancy rate was 1.9%.

Racial composition as of the 2020 census
Race	Number	Percent
White	1,003	77.7%
Black or African American	3	0.2%
American Indian and Alaska Native	9	0.7%
Asian	7	0.5%
Native Hawaiian and Other Pacific Islander	0	0.0%
Some other race	62	4.8%
Two or more races	207	16.0%
Hispanic or Latino (of any race)	264	20.4%

=== 2010 census ===
Santa Margarita first appeared as a census designated place in the 2010 U.S. census.
