= Paso Robles AVA =

Appellation that designates wine in San Luis Obispo County, California

Coordinates: 35°36′26″N 120°36′29″W

Paso Robles
- Wine region
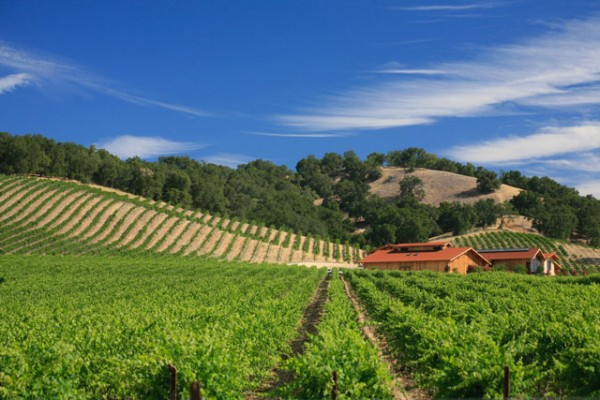
- Paso Robles vineyard
- Type: American Viticultural Area
- Year established: 1983; 1996 Extension; 2009 Expansion
- Years of wine industry: 229
- Country: United States
- Part of: California, Central Coast AVA, San Luis Obispo County
- Other regions in California, Central Coast AVA, San Luis Obispo County: York Mountain AVA, Edna Valley AVA, Arroyo Grande Valley AVA, San Luis Obispo (SLO) Coast
- Sub-regions: Adelaida District AVA, Creston District AVA, El Pomar District AVA, Paso Robles Estrella District AVA, Paso Robles Geneseo District AVA, Paso Robles Highlands District AVA, Paso Robles Willow Creek District AVA, San Juan Creek AVA, San Miguel District AVA, Santa Margarita Ranch AVA, Templeton Gap District AVA
- Climate region: Region II, III
- Heat units: 3001–3500 GDDs
- Precipitation (annual average): 10 to 25 in (250–640 mm)
- Soil conditions: Primarily, bedrock composed of weathered granite, volcanic and marine sedimentary rocks overlaid with sandstone, mudstone or calcareous shales.
- Total area: 614,000 acres (959 sq mi); 1996: 52,618 acres (82 sq mi) added 2009: 2,635 acres (4 sq mi) added
- Size of planted vineyards: 40,000 acres (16,000 ha) 1983: 5,000 acres (2,000 ha); 1996: 235 acres (95 ha) added 2009: 1,000 acres (400 ha) added
- No. of vineyards: 172
- Grapes produced: There are more than 40 wine grape varieties such as Albarino, Barbera, Cabernet Franc, Cabernet Sauvignon, Chardonnay, Counoise, Grenache, Grenache blanc, Malbec, Marsanne, Merlot, Mourvedre, Nebbiolo, Orange Muscat, Petit Verdot, Petite Sirah, Picpoul, Pinot gris, Pinot noir, Riesling, Roussanne, Sangiovese, Sauvignon blanc, Syrah, Tannat, Tempranillo, Tinta Cao, Viognier, and Zinfandel
- Varietals produced: 60
- No. of wineries: over 200

Paso Robles is an American Viticultural Area (AVA) located in northern San Luis Obispo (SLO) County, California. It was established as the nation's 44^{th}, the state's 29^{th} and the county's fourth wine appellation on October 4, 1983 by the Bureau of Alcohol, Tobacco and Firearms (ATF), Treasury after reviewing the petition submitted by Martin Brothers Winery accompanied by 51 signatures of local grape-growers and wineries proposing a viticultural area named "Paso Robles."
At the outset, the viticultural area encompassed 609,673 acres (953 sq mi) with approximately 18,500 acres (7,487 ha) cultivating wine grapes known for their heritage varietal Zinfandel, Cabernet Sauvignon, and Rhône-style wines.

== History ==
The name of the area dates from the late 18th Century, the missionary settlement period. The full Spanish name is "El Paso de Robles" (Spanish pronunciation: [/el ˈpaso ðe ˈroβles/] el-PA-so-de-RO-bles or "the Pass of the Oaks." This name was given by travelers between the San Miguel mission, located within the boundaries of the viticultural area, and Mission San Luis Obispo. A land grant, in this name, was conveyed by Governor Micheltorena to Pedro Narvaez on May 12, 1844. This land grant includes the present areas of Paso Robles, Templeton, and Adelaida. The land grant was patented on July 20, 1866, to Petronillo Rios. In 1857 the Paso Robles land grant was purchased by three men. These men, capitalizing on the hot springs and mud baths of the area, set out to make the Paso Robles Hot Springs one of the finest resort spas in the Country and built the first of the famous hotels. The community serving the hotel and resort visitors was incorporated as the City of El Paso de Robles on February 25, 1889. Since that time, the entire area of the viticultural area has been referred to as the Paso Robles area.

Grapes were first introduced into the Paso Robles area in 1787 by Spanish missionaries at Mission San Miguel Arcangel, founded in 1797, produced wine and it is assumed that the grapes were harvested in nearby areas. The earliest date was 1873 showing that approximately 40 acres (16 ha) were vineyards. One winery established in the last century is still involved in wine production, Rotta Winery, now Mid•point Wine. In addition to this winery, there are twelve others and one under construction. There were 62 existing vineyards at the establishment of Paso Robles viticultural area comprising approximately 5,000 acres (2,023 ha) with more grape plantings planned, generally adjacent to or in close proximity to the existing vineyards. Commercial wine growing, however, was not started until the 1880s with the establishment of Ascension Winery, later known as York Mountain Winery, and today known as Epoch Estate Wines. In 1914, Ignacy Jan Paderewski, the famous Polish pianist, conductor, and statesman, established a vineyard on his ranch. The Zinfandel grape was introduced to the area in this vineyard. Wine produced by York Mountain Winery from this vineyard was awarded a gold medal at the California State Fair. Since 1990, when there were fewer than 20 wineries in Paso Robles, a large expansion of activity has seen the number rise to more than 200 wineries today. Wine critic Robert M. Parker, Jr. commented on the region's promise of quality of wine, emphasizing the wineries L'Aventure, Linne Calodo, Saxum Vineyards, Doce Robles "Twelve Oaks" Winery & Vineyard, Villa Creek Cellars, Castoro Cellars and Tablas Creek Vineyard as the "leading Paso pioneers".

== AVA expansion ==
In 2007, a proposal was submitted to the Alcohol and Tobacco Tax and Trade Bureau (TTB) to split the area at the Salinas River and form a new "Paso Robles Westside AVA." The proposal was withdrawn in 2009, however, additional proposals were also submitted to the TTB naming eleven separate viticultural areas within Paso Robles AVA documenting their unique terroir characteristics. The proposed viticultural areas were: Adelaida District, Creston District, El Pomar District, Paso Robles Estrella District, Paso Robles Geneseo District, Paso Robles Highlands District, Paso Robles Willow Creek District, San Juan Creek, San Miguel District, Santa Margarita Ranch, and Templeton Gap District.

On October 9, 2014, the TTB issued a Final Rule in the Federal Register after reviewing the petitions submitted in 2007 by the Paso Robles American Viticultural Area Committee (PRAVAC) establishing eleven new viticultural areas located entirely within the existing 669,253-acre (1,046 sq mi) Paso Robles viticultural area adjacent to the northern boundary of San Luis Obispo County. The new viticultural areas were: Adelaida District, Creston District, El Pomar District, Paso Robles Estrella District, Paso Robles Geneseo District, Paso Robles Highlands District, Paso Robles Willow Creek District, San Juan Creek, San Miguel District, Santa Margarita Ranch, and Templeton Gap District.

=== Paso Robles' viticultural areas ===
- Adelaida District AVA
- Creston District AVA
- El Pomar District AVA
- Paso Robles Estrella District AVA
- Paso Robles Geneseo District AVA
- Paso Robles Highlands District AVA
- Paso Robles Willow Creek District AVA
- San Juan Creek AVA
- San Miguel District AVA
- Santa Margarita Ranch AVA
- Templeton Gap District AVA

== Wine industry ==
The Paso Robles AVA is still acknowledged for its heritage grape, Zinfandel, but has gained recognition from a wider range of grape varietals as well. In the 1950s and 1960s, growers began to plant Bordeaux varieties, particularly Cabernet Sauvignon, in the area. Starting in the 1980s, there have been increased plantings of many Rhône varieties, including the first Syrah planted in California, as well as Viognier and Roussanne to name a few. The emerging popularity of the region's wines led it to become the first site of the bi-annual "Hospice du Rhône" conference on Rhône style wine. Today, Paso Robles Wine Country is receiving attention for its unique Paso blends. These wines are unique to the area, and with varietal make-ups that do not follow traditional rules and expectations of winemaking, as characteristic in other regions of the wine world.

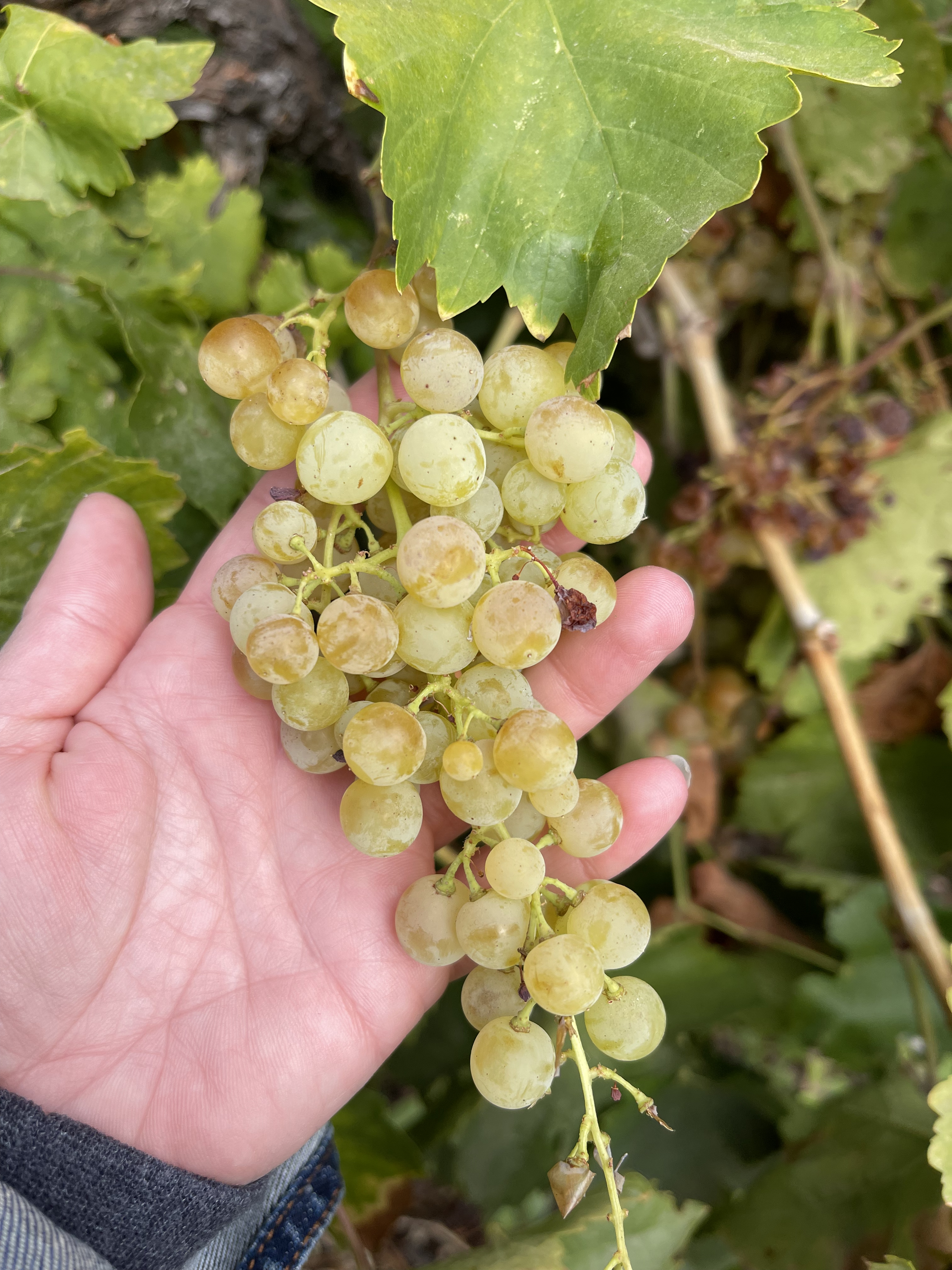
Viognier grapes

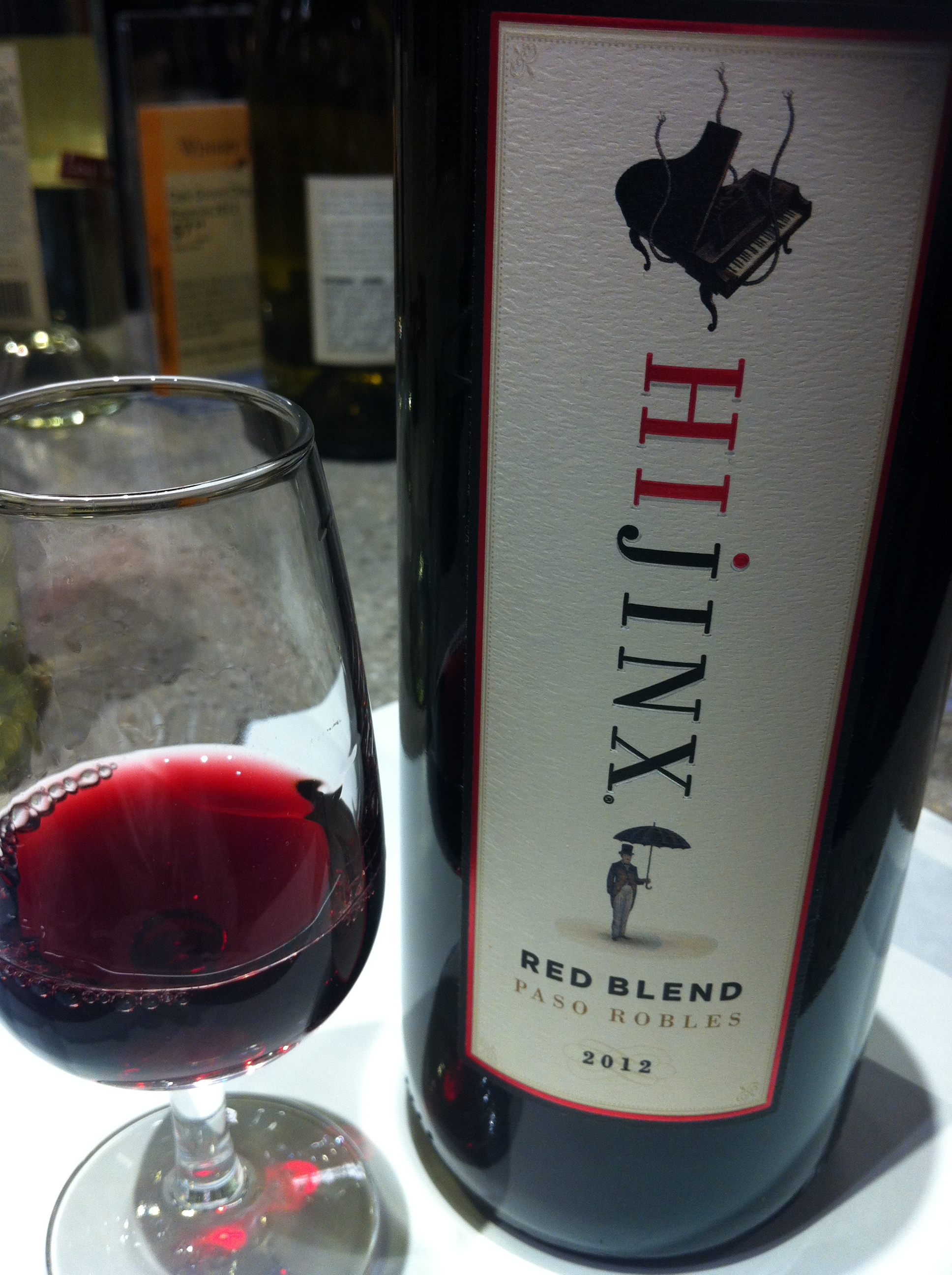
Paso Robles red blend

== Wine festivals ==
The Paso Robles Zinfandel Festival, now known as Vintage Paso: Zinfandel Weekend, is a festival focused on the Paso Robles area's heritage grape, Zinfandel. This event is held by the Paso Robles Wine Country Alliance, a non-profit cooperative marketing alliance.

The Paso Robles Wine Festival is a festival focused on the wide variety of wines the area produces, held in Paso Robles' downtown city park. Attendees have the opportunity to talk with the Paso Robles vintners and taste their wines.

The Harvest Wine Weekend is a celebration of the harvest season with three days of hands-on Paso Robles Wine Country activities.

In 2015, the Paso Robles Wine Country Alliance started a new festival, BlendFest on the Coast, dedicated to the unique wine blends of Paso Robles, held on the coast in San Simeon and Cambria.

== Recognition ==
- Wine Spectator #1 Wine in the World 2010: Saxum
- Wine Enthusiast Magazine 2013 Wine Region of the Year
- Sunset Magazine 2016 Best Wine Country Town
