= Rancho Asuncion =

Mexican land grant in California

Coordinates: 35.520°N 120.740°W

Rancho Asuncion was a 39,225-acre (158.74 km^{2}) Mexican land grant in present-day San Luis Obispo County, California. It was given in 1845 by Governor Pío Pico to Pedro Estrada. The grant extended along the Salinas River in the Santa Lucia Range, and encompassed present-day Atascadero. Originally, Rancho de le Asuncion was part of the Mission San Miguel Arcángel territory and as such, was part of the Salinan Indian tribal territory.

== History ==
Pedro Pascual Estrada (1822–1897), son of José Raimundo Estrada and Josefa Vallejo de Alvarado, was born in Monterey. Pedro Estrada was granted Rancho Asuncion, originally part of the Mission San Miguel Arcángel located in San Luis Obispo County, in 1845. As such, this land grant was part of the original territory of the Mission Salinan Indians of San Luis Obispo. The original territorial declaration for the San Miguel Mission was submitted by Father Juan Cabot on November 26, 1827. This territorial declaration was required under a decree from Governor Jose M. Encheandia that demanded that the missionaries of the California Missions report on the territorial lands of their respective establishments.

His brother Joaquín Tomas Estrada was granted the adjacent Rancho Santa Margarita in 1841.

With the cession of California to the United States following the Mexican-American War, the 1848 Treaty of Guadalupe Hidalgo provided that the land grants would be honored. As required by the Land Act of 1851, a claim for Rancho Asuncion was filed with the Public Land Commission on February 12, 1853, and the grant was patented to Pedro Estrada in 1866.

Pedro Estrada sold the rancho in 1861 to Martin Murphy Jr. (1807–1884) and his wife Mary Bulger Murphy (d.1892) of Sunnyvale, who had come to California with the Stephens-Townsend-Murphy Party in 1844. The Murphys turned over running of the rancho to their son Patrick Murphy, who was a General in the California National Guard. Patrick Washington Murphy (1840–1901) operated Rancho Asuncion, and the adjacent Rancho Atascadero, and Rancho Santa Margarita, altogether comprising about 61,000 acres (247 km^{2}), from his Rancho Santa Margarita headquarters

== Mission San Miguel Arcángel Territory Declaration of November 26, 1827 ==
On October 7, 1827, the territorial assembly adopted a decree which governor Jose M. Echeandia published on the same day. This law demanded that the missionaries of all the California Missions report on the lands of their respective missionary establishments and give a minute description of the boundaries. Father Juan Cabot accordingly reported for Mission San Miguel as follows:

Complying with the proclamation published by the Commandante General of this Province, Don Jose Maria Echeandia on October 7, 1827, I inform the government of this territory with regard to what it asks in Article One of said Proclamation.

This Mission, toward the east, has no boundaries whatever, because it has no other neighbors than the pagans who are about 25 leagues distant.

Toward the west, likewise, it has no neighbors as far as the ocean, which is from 12 to 14 leagues distant.

Towards the south the lands of Mission San Luis Obispo are recognized to extend to the Rancho de la Asuncion, distant from here seven leagues.

Towards the north, the Mission claims the land to the Rancho de San Bartolome, or Pleyto, distant about seven leagues to the boundary of Mission San Antonio.

The land to the east is waste land, because scarcely any cattle occupy it. Some herds of breeding mares, and in season some horses, rove about there. Owing to the scarcity of pastures and water they change from one place to another. It is all una bura miseria.

From the Mission to the beach the land consists almost entirely of mountain ridges, devoid of permanent water. For this reason, that region is not occupied until one reaches the coast where the Mission has a house of adobe. Here it may cultivate some clear land for planting grain in summertime but it is entirely dependent upon rain, since there is no irrigated land there. In the same district 800 cattle, some tame horses and breeding mares are kept at said Rancho, which is called San Simeon.

In the direction toward the south, all the land is occupied, for the Mission there maintains all its sheep, besides the horses of the guards. It is there it has the Rancho de Santa Isabel, where there is a small vineyard. Other ranchos of the Mission in that direction are San Antonio, where barley is planted; Rancho del Paso de Robles where the wheat is sown; and the Rancho de le Asuncion. In these last two named ranchos there is an adobe building, roofed with tiles, for keeping the seed grain. However, all is dependent upon rain, because there is no means to irrigate the land, save at Asuncion, where there is a little spring with sufficient water for a garden; and at Santa Isabel, which has a little more in summer.

To the north as far as San Bartolome, the Mission at present occupies no land, because it has not the hands to work it, and because that land is not considered suitable for cultivation. It is indeed tierra miserable, on account of the lack of pastures. At times the Rio Nacimiento overruns it, distant two leagues from the Mission.

Between the east and north this Mission owns a small spring of warm water and a vineyard distant two leagues.

The grain with which these poor Indians of the Mission maintain themselves are barley and wheat, but all dependent upon rain. When, therefore, in a year there is scarcity of water there is so much want that it is necessary to let them go free to the mountains where they may search for wild seeds. Lands for sowing grains in the summer are few, owing to the lack of water for irrigation.

In a word, with regard to planting all kinds of seeds and grain this Mission suffers the greatest drawbacks from the want of suitable land. Such as is good lies at a distance of six or seven leagues, and is cultivated amid untold labor and thousands of anxieties.

"Forests are unknown here, except the mountain which in an arroyo has some groves. There are two streams, one of which runs past the front of the Mission, and the Nacimiento. Both are of no advantage owing to the lack of land, and both run dry in the summer.

"The herds of the Mission consist of 2130 cattle, 120 oxen, 7904 sheep and 62 pigs. Enclosed find an impression of the cattle brand of this Mission.

With what has been said it seems the command has been executed. If there be any error, please to attribute it to ignorance or forgetfulness, not to ill-will.

"Mission San Miguel, Archangel, in Upper California, November 26, 1827.

Fr. Juan Cabot.

== The Records of Salinan Indian Territory and the Toro Creek Lawsuit ==
During the later 1920s and early 1930s, the Luigi Marre Land & Cattle Company filed a lawsuit to evict the Baylon Family of Salinan Indians from their rightful native home in Toro Creek between Morro Bay and Atascadero. The property in question had been the home for many Salinan Indians since the founding of Mission San Miguel on July 25, 1797. During this lawsuit, the actual records from Pedro Estrada's application to the Public Land Commission, located with the Office of the Clerk of the United States District, San Francisco, California, were investigated by Ignatius F. Parker on behalf of the United States Attorney General. This investigation revealed that the finding of the Justice of the Peace for San Luis Obispo County with references to the occupation of the Rancho Asuncion by Indians. The land rights of the Salinan Indians, under Spanish, Mexican, and eventually American law, were supposed to remain in place indefinitely as those rights were part of the final grant to Pedro Estrada for Rancho Asuncion. Those land rights were never recognized by the eventual land owners of this property and were never properly enforced by the County of San Luis Obispo.

== See also ==
- Ranchos of California
- List of Ranchos of California
