= Creston District AVA =

Appellation that designates wine in San Luis Obispo County, CA

Coordinates: 35°33′58″N 120°30′47″W

Creston District
- Wine region
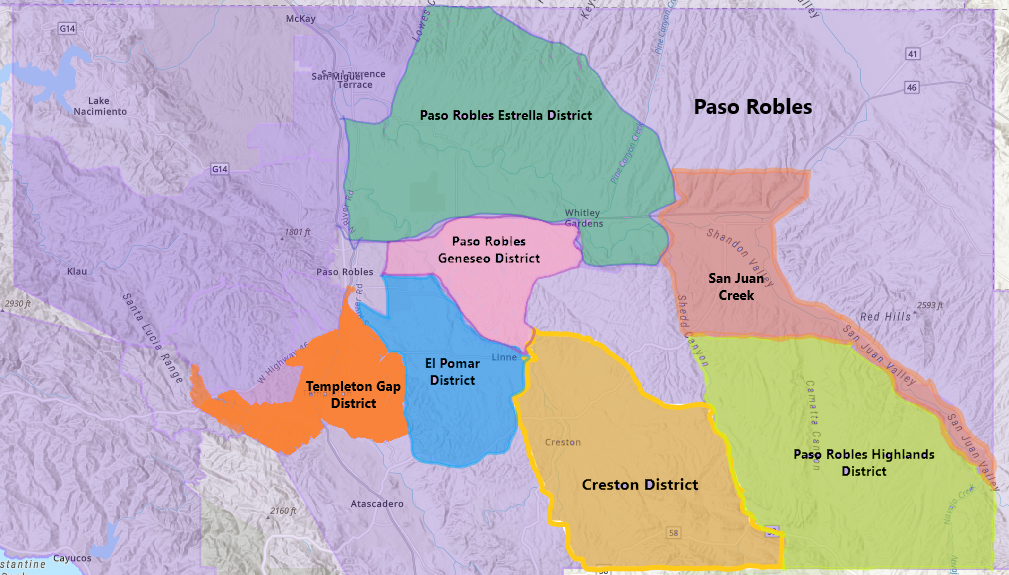
- Type: American Viticultural Area
- Year established: 2014
- Country: United States
- Part of: California, Central Coast AVA, San Luis Obispo County, Paso Robles AVA
- Other regions in California, Central Coast AVA, San Luis Obispo County, Paso Robles AVA: Adelaida District AVA, El Pomar District AVA, Paso Robles Estrella District AVA, Paso Robles Geneseo District AVA, Paso Robles Highlands District AVA, Paso Robles Willow Creek District AVA, San Juan Creek AVA, San Miguel District AVA, Santa Margarita Ranch AVA, Templeton Gap District AVA
- Climate region: Region III
- Precipitation (annual average): 11.5 in (292.1 mm)
- Soil conditions: Old, well developed terrace and hillside soils; mix of granitic and sedimentary rocks
- Total area: 47,000 acres (73 sq mi)
- Size of planted vineyards: 1,365 acres (552 ha)
- No. of vineyards: 14
- Varietals produced: Cabernet Sauvignon, Merlot, Petite Sirah (Durif), Syrah, Zinfandel

Creston District is an American Viticultural Area (AVA) located in the south east portion of the Paso Robles viticultural area in San Luis Obispo (SLO) County, California. It is located in the vicinity of the small community of Creston and was established as the nation's 217^{th}, the state's 133^{rd} and county's seventh appellation on October 9, 2014 by the Alcohol and Tobacco Tax and Trade Bureau (TTB), Treasury after reviewing the petitions submitted in 2007 by the Paso Robles American Viticultural Area Committee (PRAVAC) to establish 11 new viticultural areas located entirely within the existing 669,253-acre (1,046 sq mi) Paso Robles viticultural area adjacent to the northern boundary of San Luis Obispo County. The proposed viticultural areas were: Adelaida District, Creston District, El Pomar District, Paso Robles Estrella District, Paso Robles Geneseo District, Paso Robles Highlands District, Paso Robles Willow Creek District, San Juan Creek, San Miguel District, Santa Margarita Ranch, and Templeton Gap District.

Creston District encompasses 47,000 acres (73 sq mi) with 1,365 acres (552 ha) of cultivated vineyards. It lies on an old erosional plateau at the base of the La Panza Range with alluvial terraces and fans of Huerhuero Creek. The area rises 1,000 to 2,000 feet (300–610 m) in elevation and the average annual rainfall is 11.5 inches (292 mm).

== Name Evidence ==
The "Creston District" name is based on its historical and modern association with the region. The "District" modifier indicates that the Creston District viticultural area is a sub-region of the larger Paso Robles viticultural area. "Creston" and "Creston District" have been used historically to identify the small rural community, school district, community services district, electoral precinct, and groundwater planning area of San Luis Obispo County contained within the Creston District viticultural area. The town of Creston, originally named "Huerhuero" after a land grant in the area, was founded in 1884. The town name eventually was changed to "Creston" in honor of a founding father of the area, C.J. Cressey. According to an 1890 San Luis Obispo county map based on government and county surveys, the "Creston" name also identifies the larger region within the Creston District viticultural area. A 1913 San Luis Obispo County Surveyor map shows Creston voting precinct. In addition, historical references to the "Creston District" are contained in the "History of San Luis Obispo County" by Morrison and Haydon, which was published in 1917 and reprinted in 2002 as the "Pioneers of San Luis Obispo County and Environs," and which includes, for example, the biography of John D. Biggs, who "...engaged in farming in the Creston district." The first school district named "Creston District" was formed in 1885, and, in 1923, several rural school districts merged to form the Creston Elementary School District, according to the "History of Creston Elementary School".
Today, Creston continues to be a well-known community and region of San Luis Obispo County. The USGS Creston Quadrangle map identifies the small town of Creston within the historical Rancho Huerhuero Land Grant, and a 2001 map published by the Automobile Club of Southern California (California Regional Series, San Luis Obispo County map) identifies the small town of Creston to the southeast of the city of Paso Robles. Multiple local businesses located in the Creston District viticultural area use "Creston" in their names, including Creston Valley Meats, Creston Valley Quilt Ranch, Creston Farms, and the Creston Volunteer Firefighters (which are no longer active, but which served an area that closely approximates the boundaries of the Creston District viticultural area).

== Boundary Evidence ==
According to the boundary description and USGS maps, the northern portion of the Creston District viticultural area boundary uses a road and straight lines to connect map points across a series of foothills and rugged mountain terrain. The boundary in this area separates the rugged terrain of the Creston District viticultural area from the rolling hills and lower elevations in the region to the north, which is within the larger Paso Robles viticultural area but not within any of the other viticultural areas. The eastern portion of the Creston District viticultural area boundary includes portions of Indian Creek, roads, and a straight line. TTB notes that the Creston District viticultural area shares the eastern portion of its boundary with most of the western portion of the Paso Robles Highlands District viticultural area boundary. The southern portion of the boundary shares part of the southern portion of the Paso Robles viticultural area boundary, which is also concurrent with part of the northern Los Padres National Forest boundary. The land to the south of the Creston District viticultural area is increasingly steep and rugged, especially in the Los Padres National Forest, as the terrain ascends into the La Panza Range. The western portion of the boundary follows the Huerhuero Land Grant line, other lines that closely follow the land grant, and the Middle Branch of the Huerhuero Creek. The terrain is more mountainous to the southwest of the Creston District viticultural area; to the northwest, the terrain tends to be more gentle and flat. The El Pomar District and Paso Robles Geneseo District viticultural areas share sections of the northwest portion of the Creston District viticultural area boundary.

== History ==
The town of Creston has its roots in the Rancho Huerhuero Mexican land grant. According to the diseño, the land was largely lomas montuosas, translates as "mountainous hills," which was an area covered with trees and brush. The original Huerhuero land grant of 1842 totaled approximately 4,439 acres (7 sq mi). Its grantee Mariano Bonilla, later requested that additional land be added to the original grant because scarce water resources had resulted in his cattle spreading out widely into vacant land around the area of the original grant. As a result of his request, the boundaries were extended so that they reached Rancho Santa Margarita in the west and the Estrella River Valley in the northeast, and the area of the land grant became much greater than the original acreage.

Historical references vary widely in the stated size of the resulting, enlarged Huerhuero land grant, but the area was likely between 40,000 and 48,000 acres (63–75 sq mi). The town that is now called "Creston" was founded in 1884 by Thomas Ambrose, Amos Adams, J.V. Webster and C.J. Cressy, who bought the Huerhuero land grant and laid out a townsite. The founders originally named the town Huerhuero after the land grant. The town name was changed to Creston, however, as recounted by a local newspaper article from 1975:

People who live there call their town Creston. They have for 90 years. But that's not its name… at least, not its recorded name, even though the Post Office Department has listed the town as Creston since Jan. 26, 1885. The founding fathers, Thomas Ambrose, Amos Adams, J.V. Webster and C.J. Cressey, in March, 1884, marked out a community of nine blocks, each 300 feet square, calling it Heur Heuro after the early-day Spanish land grant in that area. They recorded the town map of Huer Huero with the County of San Luis Obispo in July 1885. This impressed the hardy pioneer residents not a whit. They liked Cressey and referred to the town as Creston to honor him.

A year after the town was founded, postal authorities established a Creston Post Office. That same year, the Creston School District was established and was located in an adobe located on the Huerhuero Rancho. The school quickly outgrew the adobe and a new schoolhouse was developed in the town.

The town of Creston boomed in its early years as ranch hands came to town on the weekends for entertainment. After World War I, land sold at much higher prices in the Creston District. The Associated Almond Growers flourished from the 1920s to the 1940s, planting approximately 5,000 acres (2,000 ha) of almonds and bringing with them workers to survey, plant and farm the land. Many of the almond orchards were removed in the 1950s to make way for grain and cattle and later sugar beets. Today, Creston District, like many other agricultural districts of the Paso Robles area, is growing due to a surge in plantings of wine grape vineyards. Vineyards have been planted in Creston District since at least the late 1800s. An early history of San Luis Obispo County describes the early cultivation of agriculture on the Huerhuero land grant as follows:

This tract of land, comprising about 48,000 acres (19,000 ha), was regarded as an exhausted sheep range, and less than four years ago was sold at $3 an acre. Mr. J. V. Webster, an experienced horticulturist of Alameda County, purchased a large area and soon commenced its cultivation. At the county fair, in the middle of October, 1888, he exhibited from the land grapes from the most choice varieties in large bunches. … In this region is the little village of Creston, with two stores, hotel, school, postoffice, shops, saloons, and residences, with many thrifty farms in the vicinity, all where four years since existed only a wilderness.

A major expansion of viticulture in the Creston District occurred in the late 1990s, with Southcorp's planting of a 400-acre (160 ha) vineyard in the area that includes heritage selections of Syrah from Penfolds' famous Magill and Kalimna vineyards in the Barossa region of Australia. The Central Coast Vineyard Team, a non-profit grower group whose mission is to promote sustainable winegrowing on the Central Coast, used this vineyard as a demonstration site for its Clean Water Project. In a newsletter describing that project, it identified this vineyard as "Camatta Hills Vineyard (Creston)."

== Terroir ==
=== Topography ===
The landscape of the Creston District viticultural area is an intermediate-to-high elevation area of old river terraces and mountain foothills at the base of the La Panza Range dominate the landscape. Huerhuero Creek bisects the viticultural area as it travels northwestward from the viticultural area through other parts of the Paso Robles viticultural area until it eventually joins the Salinas River. The East Branch and Middle Branch of the Huerhuero Creek flow through foothills and terraces, forming narrow valleys with loamy soils and near-surface water and springs. These creeks also serve as a conduit for cold air draining at night from the higher slopes of the La Panza Range into the viticultural area. Elevations of the Creston District viticultural area range from approximately 1,000 ft (300 m) along Huerhuero Creek to approximately 2,000 ft (610 m) along the southern portion of the boundary. To the south of the Creston District viticultural area, the rugged mountain terrain increases to 3,622 ft (1,104 m) in elevation at the pinnacle of Black Mountain, according to USGS maps. Vineyards in the Creston District viticultural area are mostly planted at elevations of 1,000 to 1,300 ft (300–400 m), with a few vineyards located on higher bedrock hills up to 1,800 ft (550 m). Many vineyards are located on west and southwest facing slopes to take advantage of the summer marine breezes that travel through the Templeton Gap area and into the Creston District viticultural area.

=== Climate ===
The climate of the Creston District viticultural area includes a modest marine influence by its location east of the Templeton Gap and Santa Lucia Coast Range and south of the La Panza Range. Sea breezes that blow inland off the Pacific Ocean and through the Templeton Gap passes in the Santa Lucia Range reach the Creston District viticultural area during the day, and cold air draining off the La Panza Range travels down Huerhuero Creek and into the viticultural area in the evenings. In addition, cooling marine air from Morro Bay to the south occasionally penetrates into the Creston District viticultural area. The moderating effect of the cold air drainage and the sea breezes places the temperature of the Creston District viticultural area into the low-to-moderate Region III category under the Winkler GDD system. The Creston District viticultural area also is located in the rain shadows of the La Panza Range and the Santa Lucia Range. As a result, precipitation is low within the viticultural area, averaging 11.5 in (290 mm) annually. Although the annual precipitation amounts are low, there is abundant groundwater and near-surface water along Huerhuero Creek for irrigating vineyards. The USDA plant hardiness zone is 8b to 9a.

=== Soil ===
The district soil is old, well developed terrace and hillside mix composed of granite and sedimentary rocks. The parent materials of the soils of the Creston District viticultural area are granitic rocks, non-marine sandstones, marine Monterey shales and sandstones, and the Paso Robles Formation. Over time, Huerhuero Creek has transported mixed sediments of granitic boulders, cobbles, finer gravels and sands, shales, sandstone fragments, and silts from the La Panza Range into the viticultural area. The granitics are high in silica, and the Monterey Formation shales and fine sandstones are high in calcium carbonate in some places. As the rock fragments weather and are dissolved in water, the resulting materials cause cementation of the sediments and soils, decreasing the soil's water-holding capacity and rooting depths for plants, including grapevines. The true loams to sandy loams in the area have a higher percentage of granitic coarse sands and gravels, allowing for deeper rooting depths and better drainage. Most of the soils are slightly acidic at the surface and more alkaline at depths below the surface. Soil textures in the Creston District viticultural area are predominantly fine sandy loams to sandy loams along the creeks, to gravelly sandy loams to clay loams on the terraces. The most common soil order in the area is the moderately developed grassland Mollisols, followed by younger, poorly developed Inceptisols and Entisols along the creeks, the occasional older Alfisols on higher hillsides, and heavy clay Vertisols in some low-lying spots. Area soils are considered moderately fertile.

== Viticulture ==
The Creston Manor winery was founded in 1980 in the southeastern corner of the new viticultural area. In 1989, it became the first SLO County winery to have their vintages selected for the White House inaugural ceremonies of President George H. W. Bush. The winery later changed its name to Creston Vineyards and Winery and its facilities are currently being leased to a winery operating under the name Calf Canyon Winery. Various other vineyards and wineries have been established in the Creston District in the last two decades. The winery Chateau Margene, established in 1997, describes its location as the "beautiful countryside of Creston." Loma Linda Vineyards on Rancho La Loma Linda Drive describes its location as "13 miles east of Paso Robles in beautiful Creston." An 11 acres (4.5 ha) head-pruned Zinfandel vineyard named Creston Hills Vineyard is also located within the Creston District. Notable vineyards within Creston District include Chateau Margene, Parrish Vineyard, Defiance Vineyard, Stanger Vineyard, Shadow Run Vineyard and B & E Vineyard Winery. The most widely planted varieties are Cabernet Sauvignon, Chardonnay, Merlot, Petite Sirah, Pinot Noir, Syrah and Zinfandel.
