= El Pomar District AVA =

Appellation that designates wine in San Luis Obispo County, CA

Coordinates: 35°33′04″N 120°35′51″W

El Pomar District
- Wine region
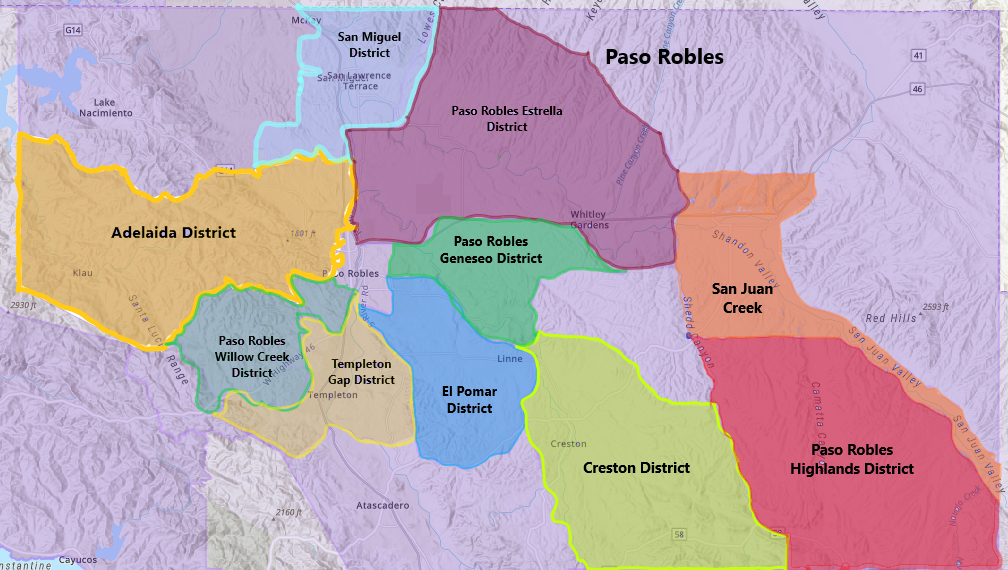
- Type: American Viticultural Area
- Year established: 2014
- Years of wine industry: 140
- Country: United States
- Part of: California, Central Coast AVA, San Luis Obispo County, Paso Robles AVA
- Other regions in California, Central Coast AVA, San Luis Obispo County, Paso Robles AVA: Adelaida District AVA, Creston District AVA, Paso Robles Estrella District AVA, Paso Robles Geneseo District AVA, Paso Robles Highlands District AVA, Paso Robles Willow Creek District AVA, San Miguel District AVA, San Juan Creek AVA, Santa Margarita Ranch AVA, Templeton Gap District AVA
- Growing season: 214 days
- Climate region: Region II
- Heat units: 2,950 GDD units
- Precipitation (annual average): 15 inches (380 mm)
- Soil conditions: Terrace alluvial soils, with sandy, clay, and gravelly loam textures; primarily alkaline
- Total area: 21,300 acres (33.3 sq mi)
- Size of planted vineyards: 2,000 acres (810 ha)
- No. of vineyards: 9
- Grapes produced: Cabernet Franc, Cabernet Sauvignon, Chardonnay, Grenache, Malbec, Merlot, Mourvèdre, Petite Sirah, Pinot Gris, Primitivo, Sauvignon Blanc, Syrah, Viognier, Zinfandel
- No. of wineries: 16

El Pomar District is an American Viticultural Area (AVA) located in San Luis Obispo County, California and within the multi-county Central Coast AVA. It was established as the nation's 219^{th}, the state's 135^{th} and county's eighth appellation on October 9, 2014 by the Alcohol and Tobacco Tax and Trade Bureau (TTB), Treasury after reviewing the petitions submitted in 2007 by the Paso Robles American Viticultural Area Committee (PRAVAC) to establish 11 new viticultural areas located entirely within the existing 669,253-acre (1,046 sq mi) Paso Robles viticultural area adjacent to the northern boundary of San Luis Obispo County. The proposed viticultural areas were: Adelaida District, Creston District, El Pomar District, Paso Robles Estrella District, Paso Robles Geneseo District, Paso Robles Highlands District, Paso Robles Willow Creek District, San Juan Creek, San Miguel District, Santa Margarita Ranch, and Templeton Gap District.

El Pomar District viticultural area is located in the central portion of the Paso Robles viticultural area, southeast of the city of Paso Robles. The 21,300 acres (33.3 sq mi) viticultural area extends south between U.S. 101 and communities of Templeton to the west and Creston in the east, and to its southern boundary outlined by SR-41. Currently, El Pomar District has approximately 2,000 acres (810 ha) of vineyards with at least sixteen bonded wineries. The petition also notes that two of the vineyards the viticultural area are named El Pomar Vineyards and Pomar Junction Vineyards.

== History ==
The El Pomar District name is based on its historical and modern connection with the region. Its name originally dates back to the early 1900s and continues to be widely used by local residents, realtors, wineries, grape growers, and others. The El Pomar District is generally defined as "[a]n area between Templeton and Creston noted for its fruit and almond growing. Its name derives from the Latin word "pomum" meaning "edible fruit," which tells the fascinating story of agricultural evolution, from historic almond orchards to world-class vineyards. The viticultural area corresponds with the historical references to the El Pomar area, according to a local history book, "The End of the Line, Recollections and a History of Templeton," compiled by Al Willhoit. The Santa Ysabel Land Grant and the subdivision of Eureka Rancho, both of which are generally located within the locale, have historically been associated with the El Pomar District. As noted in Willhoit's book, "[t]he area to become the El Pomar District lies within the Santa Ysabel, part of the tract known as the Eureka Rancho, being a portion of the subdivisions of Rancho La Asuncion." A 1926 advertisement touts El Pomar District as "the Almond Center of California." El Pomar District was first subdivided into separate lots in 1886, and early settlers planted orchards in the area shortly thereafter. By 1968, the area had 1,375 acres of almonds and 36 acres of walnuts. Today, however, many of those almond and walnut orchards are being replaced by wine grape vineyards as the Paso Robles wine industry flourishes. El Pomar Drive and South El Pomar Road run through the approximate middle of the El Pomar District viticultural area, and a San Luis Obispo County Web site contains a map (included with the petition) that identifies El Pomar Drive and South El Pomar Road in the El Pomar District viticultural area.

Vineyards have been planted in the El Pomar District since at least the late 1800s. In 1886, Gerd Klintworth planted a vineyard on a property that is now named Red Head Ranch, near Cripple Creek Road at the eastern edge of the El Pomar District viticultural area. Grapes were also planted here early on, with their high quality recognized as early as the 1920s. In 1926, the Paso Robles Press reported:

The planting of grapes have been taken up by some of the ranchers, with the result that while the vineyards are not to be counted among the largest, their quality is considered with the best.

== Terroir ==
=== Topography ===
The El Pomar District viticultural area sits at the base of the La Panza Range's foothills, and old river terraces and alluvial fans on intermediate elevations dominate the landscape. The terraces and hills are underlain by granitic rocks, sandstones of the Simmler Formation, and shales of the Monterey Formation, with the Paso Robles Formation at or near the surface where the overlying sediments have been eroded. Elevations rise gradually to the south, beginning at approximately 740 feet (230 m) on nearly flat land around the Salinas River, southeast of the city of Paso Robles, and increasing to a peak of 1,600 feet (490 m) in the southern portion of the viticultural area. Vineyard elevations in El Pomar area generally vary from 840 to 960 feet (260–290 m), with a few vineyards located at 1,440 feet (440 m) on the higher hills. Although cold air drains northward off the higher slopes of the La Panza Range and into the viticultural area at night, its general topography of rolling hills and terraces makes frost and cold air ponding rare.

The southern portion of the El Pomar District viticultural area boundary uses a series of roads in the foothills of the La Panza Range that follow approximately the exposed granitic rocks and growths of dense chaparral and forest vegetation in the area. The region to the south of the viticultural area is within the Paso Robles viticultural area but not within any of the other viticultural areas. The western portion of the El Pomar District viticultural area boundary follows a series of peaks and roads that approximate the Rinconada Fault and define the western geological and topographical boundary of the area. In addition, a line of hills that rise 400 to 500 feet (120–150 m) above the fault line visually defines the western portion of the El Pomar District boundary. A portion of the western boundary is shared with the eastern boundary of the Templeton Gap District viticultural area.

At TTB's request, the El Pomar District viticultural area's northwestern corner was adjusted westward in order to follow a road and other more easily located features rather than the now hard-to-locate former city limit line of Paso Robles. The northern portion of the viticultural area boundary then extends to the ridgeline of the Huerhuero Hills area, an uplifted area along the La Panza–Huerhuero Fault. This ridgeline, which is located along the northeastern portion of the boundary, serves as a partial barrier to marine air flowing eastward from the Pacific Ocean. To the north of the boundary is the Paso Robles Geneseo District viticultural area, and the urbanized area of the city of Paso Robles is to the northwest. The regions to the north and southwest of the Creston District viticultural area are within the Paso Robles viticultural area but are not included in any of other viticultural areas. The area to the north is distinguishable from the Creston District viticultural area due to its highly eroded terrain, shallow soils, and steep slopes, which contribute to slope instability and a high erosion hazard. The region to the southwest is more mountainous and rugged; further west is the city of Atascadero. The area to the south is located outside of the Paso Robles viticultural area and contains rugged terrain with higher elevations than those of the Creston District viticultural area.

Its moderate Region II climate with airflow through and across Templeton Gap area are part of the growing season, higher and older terraces east of the Salinas River, with geology Tertiary to Quaternary Paso Robles Formation and more recent alluvial deposits of Huerhuero Creek and Salinas River, grassland soils with well developed surface horizons as Mollisols, with bedrock at shallow depths in some areas covered by alluvium, oak savanna vegetation.

=== Climate ===
The El Pomar District viticultural area is located several miles to the east and on the lee, or rain shadow, side of the Santa Lucia Range crest, which blocks much of the moisture and storms that move in from the Pacific Ocean and precipitation in the area annually averages 15 inches (380 mm). However, the viticultural area does receive significant marine air incursion, fog, and sea breezes through the Templeton Gap, which is located in the Santa Lucia Range to the area's west. The hillsides and hilltop vineyards within the El Pomar District viticultural area are exposed to the cooling marine air during the growing season. Due to the cooling sea breezes and fog, the El Pomar District viticultural area has a relatively cool Winkler Region II growing season climate, averaging 2,950 growing degree-day (GDD) units annually. The USDA plant hardiness zone is 8b to 9a.

=== Soils ===
The parent materials of soils within the El Pomar District viticultural area are granitic rock, sandstones of the Simmler Formation, shales of the Monterey Formation, and the Paso Robles Formation. Many of these soils have calcareous shale fragments, with secondary lime deposited within the soil profiles. The most common soil series within the viticultural area are from the Linne-Calodo series and are mostly alkaline. Soil textures in the El Pomar District viticultural area include clay loams and sandy loams, with many gravelly units. The most common soil order is the moderately developed grassland Mollisols, followed by younger, poorly developed Inceptisols and Entisols along the creeks. The soils have shallow to moderate rooting depths, modest nutrient levels, and low to moderate water holding capacity, which create low to moderate vigor vineyard sites.

== Viticulture ==
The El Pomar viticultural area is located in the center of the vast Paso Robles AVA and central to its viticultural activity. Major growth in El Pomar District viticulture has occurred since year 2000, evidenced by both new or revived small, boutique wineries (such as Still Waters Vineyards, Hansen Vineyards, McClean Vineyards and Pomar Junction Vineyards) and new vineyard plantings by large wineries seeking high quality fruit, such as J. Lohr Winery, which planted a 200 acres (81 ha) vineyard at the corner of Creston Road and Neal Springs Road, and Gallo, which planted the 650 acres (260 ha) Sunnybrook Vineyard in the area in late 1990s. The El Pomar District viticultural area encompasses an area of approximately 21,300 acres (33 sq mi) and currently is home to approximately 2,000 acres (810 ha) of vineyards and at least sixteen bonded wineries. The district itself falls geographically close to the city of Paso Robles, and the wine styles of the region are very similar to those of the larger Paso Robles AVA with Cabernet Sauvignon and Merlot reigning supreme. However, the growing conditions in El Pomar also allow for grapes that thrive in the cooler weather that travels in from the Templeton Gap, like Grenache or Cabernet Franc.
