= Paso Robles Highlands District AVA =

Appellation that designates wine in San Luis Obispo County, CA

Coordinates: 35°30′17″N 120°14′42″W

Paso Robles Highlands District
- Wine region
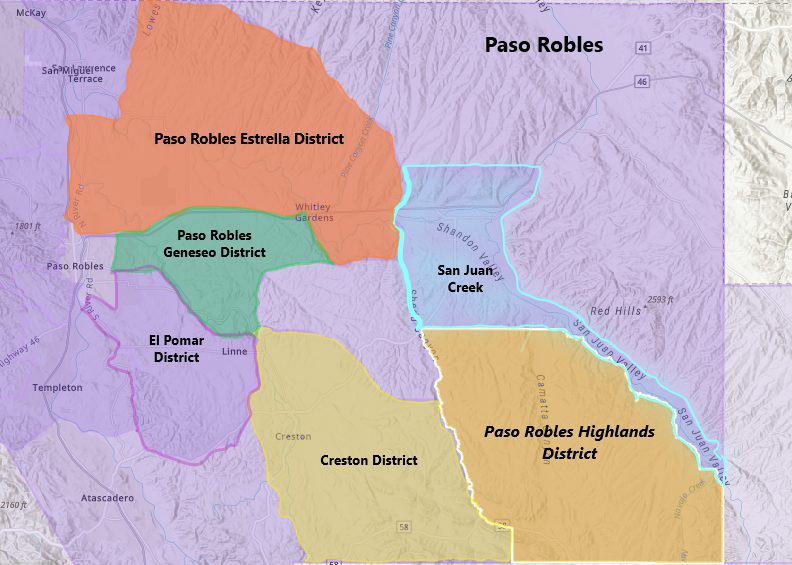
- Other names: Highlands District
- Type: American Viticultural Area
- Year established: 2014
- Years of wine industry: 53
- Country: United States
- Part of: California, Central Coast AVA, San Luis Obispo County, Paso Robles AVA
- Other regions in California, Central Coast AVA, San Luis Obispo County, Paso Robles AVA: Adelaida District AVA, Creston District AVA, El Pomar District AVA, Paso Robles Estrella District AVA, Paso Robles Geneseo District AVA,Paso Robles Willow Creek District AVA, San Miguel District AVA, San Juan Creek AVA, Santa Margarita Ranch AVA, Templeton Gap District AVA
- Growing season: 197 days
- Climate region: Region IV
- Heat units: 3,678 GDDs
- Precipitation (annual average): 12 in (300 mm)
- Soil conditions: Deep alluvial soils, with sandy to coarse and clay loam textures
- Total area: 60,300 acres (94 sq mi)
- Size of planted vineyards: 2,000 acres (810 ha)
- No. of vineyards: 3
- Grapes produced: Cabernet Sauvignon, Chenin Blanc, Petite Sirah, Syrah, Valdigue

Paso Robles Highlands District is an American Viticultural Area (AVA) located in San Luis Obispo County, California and lies within the multi-county Central Coast AVA. It was established as the nation's 222^{nd}, the state's 138^{th} and the county's eleventh appellation on October 9, 2014, by the Alcohol and Tobacco Tax and Trade Bureau (TTB), Treasury after reviewing the petitions submitted in 2007 by the Paso Robles American Viticultural Area Committee (PRAVAC) to establish 11 new viticultural areas located entirely within the existing Paso Robles viticultural area adjacent to the northern boundary of San Luis Obispo County. The proposed viticultural areas were: Adelaida District, Creston District, El Pomar District, Paso Robles Estrella District, Paso Robles Geneseo District, Paso Robles Highlands District, Paso Robles Willow Creek District, San Juan Creek, San Miguel District, Santa Margarita Ranch, and Templeton Gap District. The AVA Committee's petition originally proposed the viticultural area named "Paso Robles Canyon Ranch."
However, the Canyon Ranch Spa began to market wine under that name after the petitions were filed with the TTB. Although, the PRAVAC had "first in time, first in right," strong evidence in the form of other trademark registrations and COLAs supported the argument that the Canyon Ranch Spa marks are geographically descriptive and hence not registrable. Nevertheless, the PRAVAC and the wine growers did not want to delay the processing of the eleven AVA petitions as result of the CR License's claim of impact to its Canyon Ranch brand. Therefore, they resolved the potential dispute over the "Canyon Ranch" name, and did the historical research and identified the "Highlands" or "Highlands District" as long been used to describe the vast, but relatively unpopulated, area marked with canyons and highlands since the late 1800s.

The Paso Robles Highlands District extends from just south of the town of Shandon to the base of the La Panza Range to its south. The Highlands District AVA encompasses 60,300 acres (94.2 sq mi), making it the second-largest in Paso Robles AVA. Local residents still use the name "Highlands" to refer to the region of canyons and highlands to the east of Creston located within the Paso Robles Highlands District viticultural area, according to the petition. Based on the common use of the term "Highlands" throughout the United States, the words "Paso Robles" and "District" were added as modifiers to the viticultural area name.

== History ==
The "Paso Robles Highlands District" name is based on the historical and current use of the "Highlands" or "Highlands District" name by local residents to refer to the geographical region of the Paso Robles Highlands District viticultural area since at least the late 1800s. The Highlands School District, located largely within the viticultural area, appears in local records as early as 1890. Although the school district did not extend to the eastern boundary of the viticultural area, the Highlands School drew students from a broader area due to difficulties in accessing other schools in the region. In addition, a book documenting the settlement and development of the region refers to it as "the Highland district." The name, "Highlands" is a name that residents of this area have traditionally referred to since at least the late 1800s.

The area has never been the home of a formal town or settlement. Consequently, little has been written about the area, and its early history is not well documented. The land in the area has long been the site of vast cattle ranches with few inhabitants. Paso Robles Canyon Ranch dates back to the early 1900s and to one of San Luis Obispo County's pioneering businessmen. The vast tracts of land that comprise the Canyon Ranch property were acquired in 1905 and 1915 by Bernard Sinsheimer, a well-known merchant in 19th century San Louis Obispo County. The family were major landowners at the time and established a working cattle ranch in the region. Descendants of Sinsheimer continue to this day to operate a large cattle ranch within the Highlands District.

Bernard, his brother Henry and his half-brother A. Z. (Aron Zacharias) were pioneering merchants in the county. Of German-Jewish background, the brothers came to post-Civil War California separately after previous residences in New York and Mississippi. Bernhard came to San Luis Obispo in 1874 and first appears in an 1875 San Luis Obispo directory with his occupation listed as a clerk. In 1876, Bernhard and Henry purchased from Bartolo Brizzolara his "stock of general merchandise including one iron safe, platform and counter scales, [and] lamps now used in my store located on Monterey St. in San Luis Obispo." By 1878, the brothers operated their own general merchandise store in San Luis Obispo. They acted as commissioners in beans and grain, ran cattle, developed land, and supplied farmers and ranchers with goods, equipment, and loans. Customers resided in several counties up and down the Central Coast and east into the San Joaquin Valley, and a Santa Maria branch of the store was opened during the 1880s. The 1880s were boom years for real estate promotion in California, and land development was important even in remote San Luis Obispo County. The Sinsheimers became major landowners, acquiring properties throughout San Luis Obispo County and adjacent counties. Among these properties was the Canyon Ranch, which was acquired by Bernard in separate purchases in 1905 and 1915. The Canyon Ranch began as a working cattle ranch in the early 1900s, and it has remained a working cattle ranch ever since. The children of Bernhard Sinsheimer carried on the family business tradition. This branch of the Sinsheimer family eventually changed its surname to Sinton due to anti-German sentiments during World War I. His descendants, the Sinton family, continue to live on and operate Canyon Ranch as a working cattle ranch; they are active leaders in the local and ranching communities.

Viticulture in the Paso Robles Highlands District consists of three large vineyards, Shell Creek Vineyards, Shandon Hills Vineyard and French Camp Vineyards, all of which were first planted in the early 1970s. Shell Creek Vineyards was owned by the Sinton family, which has owned the Canyon Ranch property since its creation over 100 years ago. The name of the vineyard comes from a creek that runs through the property in wet years that actually carries small pieces of fossilized shells that are found farther upstream on the property. Shell Creek Vineyards was planted in 1972 on its own roots and is known for its award-winning Petite Sirah. Although Shell Creek does not have its own winery, several wineries across California produce and bottle Petite Sirah and Syrah with a Shell Creek Vineyards designation. Shell Creek Vineyards began as 100 acres (40 ha) and has since expanded to 125 acres (51 ha). Shell Creek Vineyards grows Petite Sirah, Cabernet Sauvignon, Syrah, Chenin Blanc, and Valdiguie (formerly known as Napa Gamay). The vineyard was originally planted on its own roots, but as the vineyard ages the vines are being replaced with grafted wood from the older vines on new rootstock to make them more resistant to disease. Since 2007, Shell Creek was renamed Avenales Ranch. Shandon Hills Vineyard was originally owned by Thomas Sinton, a cousin of the Shell Creek Vineyards owners, and was once part of Shell Creek Vineyards. This vineyard was also planted in 1972 on a portion of the original Canyon Ranch, but sold in the early 1980s. It is currently owned by Bob Smith and consists of approximately 165 acres (67 ha). It was planted with Petite Sirah, Zinfandel, Chardonnay, Cabernet Sauvignon, and Sauvignon Blanc on its own rootstock. Another vineyard by this same name is planted in the San Juan Creek viticultural area, and is the location of one of the weather data stations referenced in that petition and others prepared by the AVA Committee.

== Terroir ==
=== Topography ===
Paso Robles Highlands District viticultural area is topographically distinct from the central and western regions of the Paso Robles viticultural area. The terrain in Highlands District viticultural area includes large expanses of open landscape and grasslands, high ridges with scattered coniferous trees, and low hills and terraces that are bisected by canyons and channels incised by intermittent streams. These canyons and streams appear as long fingers that run predominantly south to north across the landscape. The open spaces and broad vistas of the Highlands District viticultural area serve as a geologic transition zone between the valley floor to the north and the La Panza Range to the south.

Paso Robles Highlands District viticultural area elevations generally increase from north to south toward the La Panza Range, rising from 1,160 feet (350 m) in the area's north to 2,086 feet (636 m) in the area's south. Vineyards in the Paso Robles Highlands District viticultural area are generally planted on old alluvial terraces, alluvial fans, and hill slopes at elevations of 1,200 to 1,600 feet (370–490 m). These high elevations enable vineyards in the viticultural area to benefit from more precipitation than surrounding lower elevations, as well as rapid hillside warming with the morning sun. At night, cold air drains off the high elevations and into the lower elevations outside the proposed viticultural area, reducing the risk of frost in vineyards within the proposed Paso Robles Highlands District viticultural area.

=== Climate ===
The Paso Robles Highlands District viticultural area has a more continental climate as compared to other regions within the Paso Robles viticultural area, averages 12 inches (305 mm) of precipitation annually, and is classified as a low Winkler Region IV climate. The landscape in this region transitions from valley floor to mountain slopes, with elevations ranging between 1,160 to 2,086 ft (354–636 m). Paso Robles Highlands District, 33 mi (53 km) inland from the Pacific Ocean, generally has a warmer and more continental climate with less precipitation than other regions of the Paso Robles viticultural area at similar elevations. Due to the viticultural area's location to the east of the Santa Lucia Range and northeast of the La Panza Range, it lies in a double-rain shadow. However, due to its relatively higher elevations, the Paso Robles Highlands District viticultural area still receives an average of 12 inches (300 mm), or about two inches (51 mm) more, of rain annually than the regions farther to the east.

According to the Winkler climate classification system, the Highlands District viticultural area has a low Region IV climate, based on the 3,678 average GDD units measured from 2000 to 2003 at the 1,400 ft (430 m) elevation French Camp Vineyard. The abundant sunshine and warm temperatures result in moderate yields from vineyards within the viticultural area.

The Paso Robles Highlands District viticultural area has greater daily, monthly, seasonal, and annual temperature ranges when compared to other areas within the Paso Robles viticultural area. The difference between daily maximum and minimum temperatures in the mid- and late-summer can be 50 °F (10 °C) or more, with highs around 100 °F (38 °C) and lows around 50 °F (10 °C). According to grape growers in the Paso Robles Highlands District viticultural area, the warm summer days ensure full maturity of the fruit, while the cool evenings preserve acids in the grapes. The growers also note that due to its distinctive climate, grape harvest in the proposed viticultural area occurs two to four weeks earlier than in some other areas of the Paso Robles viticultural area. The USDA plant hardiness zone is 8b.

=== Soils ===
The soil textures of the Paso Robles Highlands District viticultural area are predominantly sandy loams along the creeks, loams on the small alluvial fans, and coarse sandy loams to clay loams on the hillsides. Most soils have composite soil profiles, with older soils buried below the surface soil due to repeated alluvial deposition. In some areas, erosion has exposed some of the older buried soils. Many of the subsoils are cemented by calcium carbonate.

The soil orders within the Paso Robles Highlands District viticultural area include more weakly developed Entisols along the creeks, Inceptisols on the young alluvial fans, and Mollisols on the upslope, more stable surfaces. Old, leached Alfisols are common on hillsides in the eastern part of the viticultural area. The soils of the Paso Robles Highlands District viticultural area have low to moderate fertility, good near surface drainage, and limited rooting depth, all of which contribute to low-vigor vineyards.

Most of the younger soils within the Paso Robles Highlands District viticultural area are calcareous and alkaline at depth (with pH values of 7.9 to 8.4), and also occasionally alkaline at the surface (with pH values of 7.4 to 8.1) due to the aridity of the climate and the presence of the Monterey Formation to the south. The soil profile of the older Alfisols may be leached throughout to depth, with pH values of 5.6 to 6.5 in the acidic soils.

== Viticulture ==
Highlands District AVA encompasses about 60,300 acres (94.2 sq mi) with a little over 2,000 acres (810 ha) under vine. French Camp Vineyards is the largest single vineyard in the Paso Robles AVA. It's named after the small site where two French sheepherders were camped, and notoriously murdered, in 1857. French Camp Vineyard is located on a parcel that comprises over 5,600 acres (2,300 ha) that was purchased by the Miller family in 1968. After gathering data for several years regarding climate, soils, and water, they made an initial winegrape planting of 200 acres (81 ha) in 1973. Since then, French Camp Vineyards has grown to over 1,700 acres (690 ha) of winegrapes, with more than twenty different red and white varietals. French Camp is also recognized as a leader in vineyard mechanization. French Camp Vineyards winegrapes have been used by dozens of California wineries, many of which have used the French Camp Vineyards designation on their labels.
