= Templeton Gap District AVA =

Appellation that designates wine in San Luis Obispo County, CA

Coordinates: 35°33′18″N 120°38′36″W

Templeton Gap District
- Wine region
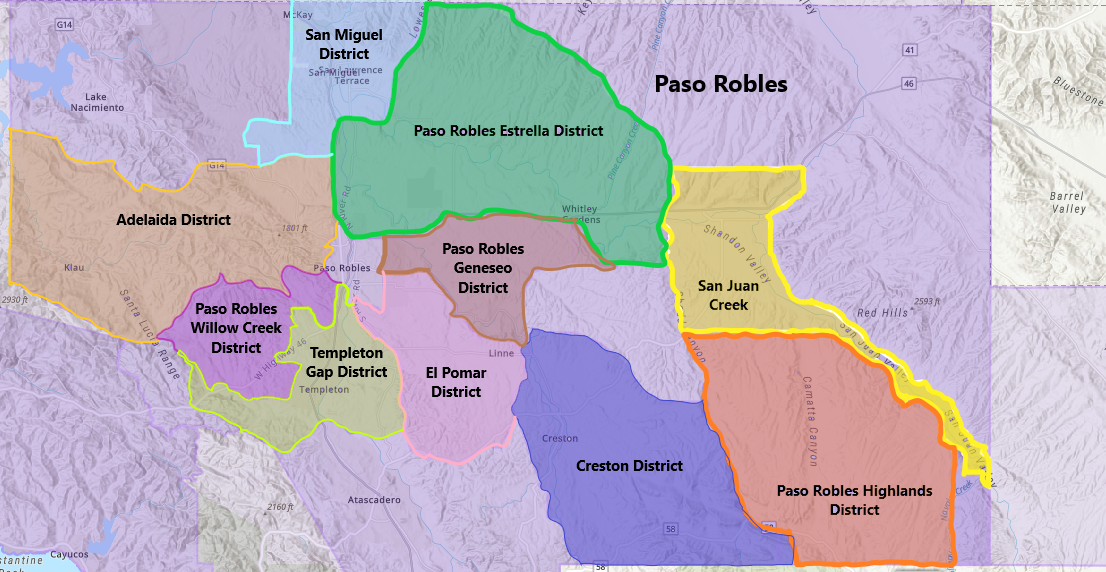
- Type: American Viticultural Area
- Year established: 2014
- Years of wine industry: 170
- Country: United States
- Part of: California, Central Coast AVA, San Luis Obispo County, Paso Robles AVA
- Other regions in California, Central Coast AVA, San Luis Obispo County, Paso Robles AVA: Adelaida District AVA, Creston District AVA, El Pomar District AVA, Paso Robles Estrella District AVA, Paso Robles Geneseo District AVA, Paso Robles Highlands District AVA, Paso Robles Willow Creek District AVA, San Miguel District AVA, San Juan Creek AVA, Santa Margarita Ranch AVA
- Growing season: 214 days
- Climate region: Region II
- Heat units: 2,900 GDD units
- Precipitation (annual average): 20 inches (510 mm)
- Soil conditions: Alluvial soils of shallow to moderate depth and sandy to silty to clay loams
- Total area: 19,017 acres (29.714 sq mi)
- Size of planted vineyards: 2,000 acres (809 ha)
- No. of vineyards: 21
- Grapes produced: Cabernet Franc, Cabernet Sauvignon, Grenache, Merlot, Mourvèdre, Syrah, Viognier, Zinfandel
- No. of wineries: 35

Templeton Gap District is an American Viticultural Area (AVA) located in San Luis Obispo County, California and within the multi-county Central Coast AVA. It was established as the nation's 227^{th}, the state's 143^{rd} and the county's sixteenth appellation on October 9, 2014 by the Alcohol and Tobacco Tax and Trade Bureau (TTB), Treasury after reviewing the petitions submitted in 2007 by the Paso Robles American Viticultural Area Committee (PRAVAC) to establish 11 new viticultural areas located entirely within the existing 669,253-acre (1,046 sq mi) Paso Robles viticultural area adjacent to the northern boundary of San Luis Obispo County. The proposed viticultural areas were: Adelaida District, Creston District, El Pomar District, Paso Robles Estrella District, Paso Robles Geneseo District, Paso Robles Highlands District, Paso Robles Willow Creek District, San Juan Creek, San Miguel District, Santa Margarita Ranch, and Templeton Gap District.

The "Templeton Gap District" is based on historical and modern name evidence associated with the region where the viticultural area is located. The name combines the town of Templeton with the term "gap," which collectively identifies several erosional landforms located along the crest of the Santa Lucia Range west of the town. Templeton, located between U.S. Route 101 and the Salinas River north of Atascadero and south of Paso Robles, is encircled within the 19,017 acres (29.714 sq mi) viticultural area containing approximately 1,600 acres (647 ha) of vineyards.

== History ==
The Templeton Gap viticultural area is one of the oldest wine regions in California. Grape growing in the region began in 1856, when a Frenchman named Adolph Siot planted the first vineyard along a road now known as Vineyard Drive. He established a commercial winery adjacent to the vineyard in 1890. The Rotta family purchased Siot's vineyard and winery in 1908 and renamed it Rotta Winery. Nearby, the Pesenti family planted grapes in 1923 and established its namesake winery in 1934. Both wineries gained local reputations for fine, affordable Zinfandels. In 1924, Sylvester Dusi planted Zinfandel at Dusi Ranch, located three miles south of Paso Robles and east of Highway 101. The Dusi family farmed and sold Zinfandel grapes for more than 80 years, but never established a winery.
During the 1920s, Italian migrants primarily transformed the Templeton landscape by removing forests to farm grains and plant Zinfandel grapes in their own small vineyards. The Paso Robles and Templeton areas are similar in geography and climate to Northern Italy with crops and vineyards planted in rolling hills and on steep mountains. Winegrower Frank Nerelli describes the areas as "so similar that you forget which country you are working in." When Prohibition was enacted in America, the legislation banned the sale and transportation of liquor, including wine. However, it was legal to grow grapes, sell them and make limited quantities of wine on your own property. It was also legal to drink wine on your own property but not to purchase it in bars, saloons, or speakeasies. The majority of Italians arrived in the San Luis Obispo area after the turn of the century and planted their vineyards in the 1920s during Prohibition. They became known for their blend of Zinfandel, Alicante Bouchet, and Carignane producing wine in their homes and wineries for religious and medicinal purposes, sold to friends and the black market. Some were arrested, fined by local authorities, had their homes raided, barrels axed and a few spent time in jail, but their wine production still thrived. The wine they produced was sold by the gallon in screw top glass containers and known as "jug wine" until the 1970s when emerging modern vintners transitioned Zinfandel from the jug to an elegant bottle. An expansion of grape growing and wine making in the region began in 1976, when Pasquale Mastan started Mastantuono Winery, which he moved a few years later to a location near Highway 46 West and Vineyard Road. The term "Templeton Gap" was coined by Ken Volk, renown Central Coast vintner, who established a vineyard along Templeton Road, southeast of Templeton in 1982 and founded Wild Horse Winery next to his vineyard a year later. Mr. Volk sold Wild Horse Winery and later produced Santa Maria Valley appellation vintages sourced from the multiple vineyards in Santa Barbara County before retiring in San Luis Obispo. In his own words, "The 'Templeton Gap' is a term I coined to describe the channeling of onshore marine airflows that are funneled by northwesterly winds coming off of Estero Bay, which greatly influence the winegrowing conditions in the Templeton area." Fratelli Perata – west of Highway 101 between Paso Robles and Templeton – was established in 1989, and nearby Hope Farms Winery was founded next to already planted estate vineyards in 1990. By 1993, when The Wine Atlas of California and the Pacific Northwest by Bob Thompson was published, the book's Paso Robles map shows six wineries and a scattering of vineyards in the Templeton Gap region. Driven by the increasing popularity of fine wines in the United States and the viticultural potential of the region, the expansion of both vineyard acreage and winery numbers in the Templeton Gap viticultural area since 1993 has been remarkable. In addition to Zinfandel, new vineyards and vintners were focused on a range of grape varieties, from Syrah, Grenache and other Rhone grapes to Cabernet Sauvignon, Merlot and Pinot Noir.

== Terroir ==
=== Topography ===
Temmpleton Gap District viticultural area is located east of an area of the Santa Lucia Range where the crest of the mountain range is lower in altitude and the range contains an erosional landform known as a "water gap" west of the town of Templeton. This gap consists of several passes through the Santa Lucia Range formed by streams carving into the soft rocks of the Monterey Formation near the heads of their watersheds. The viticultural area's location near this gap contributes greatly to the cool, marine climate and the later harvest time of the viticultural area. The established Paso Robles AVA provides the western boundary for the Templeton Gap viticultural area. Having the western boundary of the Templeton Gap viticultural area contiguous with that of Paso Robles AVA, which closely matches the western boundary of the historic Paso de Robles land grant, acknowledges the latter's defining role in the region's modern viticultural history. The Pacific Ocean is approximately 18 nautical miles (33 km; 21 mi) to Paso Robles from its closest point being the town of Cayucos which sits at the inner apex of Estero Bay. The western border of the Templeton Gap District is much closer and as the marine layer builds across Estero Bay to altitudes of 1,400 to 1,800 ft (430–550 m), the heavier marine air spills across the range crest, easily depicted by large fingers of fog reaching over the mountains like a massive fog monster. This cool air spills through the gap along the Highway 46 West corridor and continues to flow to the lower elevations to the east, across the Templeton Gap viticultural area, and into the El Pomar District, Creston District, and the Paso Robles Estrella District. The warm days of Paso Robles have a direct cause and effect on this cooling influence. As the temperature gradient rises a vacuum effect pulls the spilling cool air inland and like clockwork, by 3 p.m. the cool breeze begins.
A ridgeline approximated by Summit Canyon, Kiler Canyon and Peachy Canyon define the northern boundary of the Templeton Gap AVA. This ridgeline moderates the marine influence to the north of the Templeton Gap area, and increases it within the Templeton Gap area, as further detailed in the petition, separating the Templeton Gap area from the warmer Adelaida District area to the north. A line of hills at elevations of 1,300 to 1,432 ft (396–436 m) above sea level that rise above the Rinconada Fault line provides the eastern boundary for the Templeton Gap viticultural area. These hills, located between one and four miles (two and six kilometers) east of the Salinas River, temper the further eastward, full cooling effects of the winds that flow from the southwest through the Templeton Gap; depending on the depth of the marine layer, fog often settles in this area and is the most visible reminder to local residents of the Templeton Gap viticultural area.
Similar soils are also found on both sides of the Salinas River near Templeton. Historically, the entire area is delineated as the Templeton Gap sub-appellation both east and west of the Salinas River has been referred to as the Templeton Gap. The southern boundary of the historic Paso de Robles land grant defines the southern boundary of the Templeton Gap viticultural area. This boundary also approximates a geological contact within the Monterey Formation between the upper and middle members. The southern and eastern boundary of the Templeton Gap viticultural area encompasses the Rotta Winery (now Mid•point Winery), Pesenti Winery (now Turley Wine Cellars), Mastantuono Winery and Wild Horse Winery & Vineyards, wineries strongly associated with Templeton Gap's early and recent historical identity. The southern boundary also marks the southern limit of Templeton Gap's identity, but in no period in its history has Templeton Gap identity extended into Atascadero proper.

=== Climate ===
The Templeton Gap District viticultural area has the most maritime climate within the Paso Robles viticultural area, with more fog and higher relative humidity, more moderated daily, monthly, and annual temperature ranges, and more persistent sea breezes. With a Winkler Region II climate of approximately 2,900 GDD units, the Templeton Gap District viticultural area, along with the Paso Robles Willow Creek viticultural area, has the coolest growing season climate within the larger Paso Robles viticultural area. Annual precipitation in the Templeton Gap District viticultural area averages 20 inches (510 mm). The passes in the crest of the Santa Lucia Range, collectively known as the Templeton Gap, bring the Pacific Ocean's maritime influence into the viticultural area. As the marine layer builds to greater heights on the ocean side of the coastal mountain slopes, the cooler and denser marine air spills through the passes and flows eastward to the lower elevations of the viticultural area. In addition, a strong pressure gradient is created when there is a marked contrast between the cooler marine air along the coast and the warmer air inland, resulting in strong sea breezes extending east and inland across the viticultural area. Due to the accelerated air flow through the passes, the Templeton Gap District viticultural area is windier than the other lowland areas of the Paso Robles viticultural area, with moderate sea breezes and regular, light mountain-valley breezes. The cool climate of the Templeton Gap District viticultural area increases the ripening period for grapes, resulting in harvest dates of approximately 10 to 14 days later than other areas in the Paso Robles viticultural area, which allows flavors to fully develop in the grapes. Also, given the sea breeze influence in the region, slope angle and aspect are important factors in determining the suitability of vineyard sites for different grape varieties. The USDA plant hardiness zone is 8b to 9a.

=== Soils ===
The soils of the Templeton Gap District area viticultural area have shallow to moderate rooting depths, moderate water stress, and modest nutrient levels. Partially cemented shaly, alluvial soils derived from the Paso Robles Formation are located on the stream terraces and on sections of older alluvial fans. The soil textures are predominantly silt loams, silty clays, clay loams, and sandy loams (with some units gravelly). Although some of the soils have slightly acidic topsoils (A horizons with pH values of 6.1 to 6.8), and others are neutral to slightly alkaline even at the surface (with shallow A horizon pH values of 7.0 to 7.8), almost all soils are alkaline at depth, with common pH values of 7.9–8.4. The most common soil order is moderately developed Mollisols (where surface humus is abundant), followed by older Vertisols (where pedogenic clay dominates the texture), and younger, poorly developed Entisols closer to streams. According to the petition, the soil characteristics make low vineyard yields common within the Templeton Gap District viticultural area.

== Viticulture ==
The new vineyards and wineries can be found throughout the region but are principally concentrated in areas pioneered during the earlier periods of viticultural development. The growth to 2,300 acres (930 ha) of vineyards and 35 wineries has been accompanied by some changes among the pioneering vintners and wineries; Rotta Winery, after being sold and closed, was reacquired and reopened by a descendant of the Rotta family, and Pesenti Winery was acquired by and renamed Turley Wine Cellars.

The influence of the coastal climate that flows through the Templeton Gap touches almost every district in the region, and provides a crucial feature in the growth process for the AVA. It also allows for some of the best Bordeaux-style blends to be crafted in the district in addition to Viognier. However, vineyards in the district also produce several of the wines the Paso Robles AVA is widely known for, Syrah, Zinfandel, and Cabernet Sauvignon varietals.
