= Paso Robles Estrella District AVA =

Appellation that designates wine in San Luis Obispo County, CA

Coordinates: 35°43′13″N 120°36′56″W

Paso Robles Estrella District
- Wine region
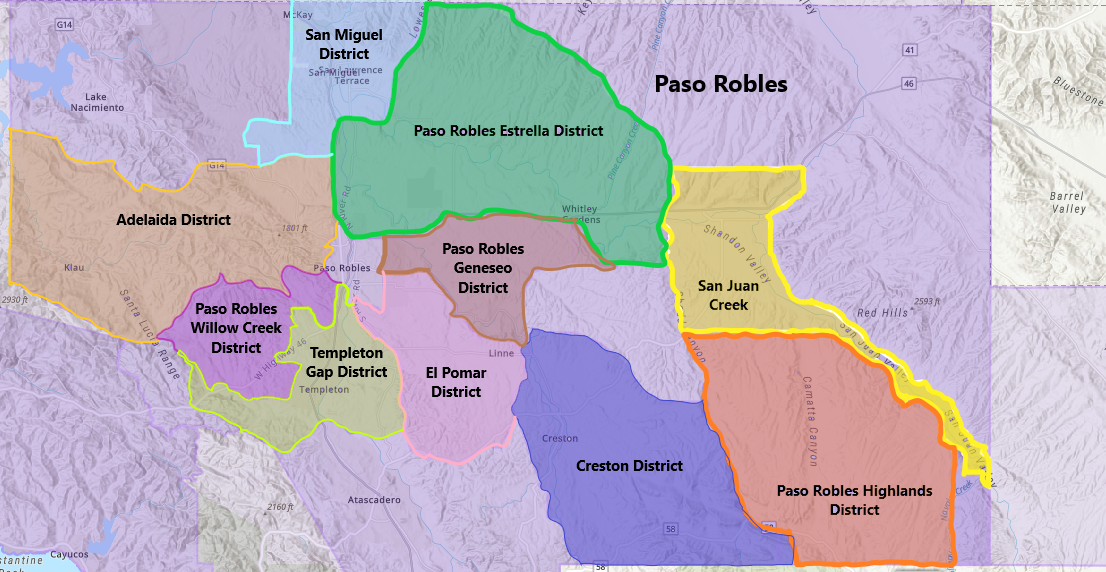
- Type: American Viticultural Area
- Year established: 2014
- Years of wine industry: 51
- Country: United States
- Part of: California, Central Coast AVA, San Luis Obispo County, Paso Robles AVA
- Other regions in California, Central Coast AVA, San Luis Obispo County, Paso Robles AVA: Adelaida District AVA, Creston District AVA, El Pomar District AVA, Paso Robles Geneseo District AVA, Paso Robles Highlands District AVA, Paso Robles Willow Creek District AVA, San Miguel District AVA, San Juan Creek AVA, Santa Margarita Ranch AVA, Templeton Gap District AVA
- Growing season: 214 days
- Climate region: Region III
- Heat units: 3,300 GDD units
- Precipitation (annual average): 12.5 to 15.5 inches (317.5–393.7 mm)
- Soil conditions: Deep to moderate depth alluvial terrace soils, with sandy to coarse and clay loam textures; slightly acidic, but more alkaline at depth.
- Total area: 66,900 acres (105 sq mi)
- Size of planted vineyards: 8,500 acres (3,440 ha)
- No. of vineyards: 35
- Grapes produced: Cabernet Sauvignon, Grenache, Merlot, Mourvèdre, Syrah
- No. of wineries: 14

Paso Robles Estrella District is an American Viticultural Area (AVA) located in San Luis Obispo County, California and within the multi-county Central Coast AVA. It was established as the nation's 220^{th}, the state's 136^{th} and the county's ninth appellation on October 9, 2014, by the Alcohol and Tobacco Tax and Trade Bureau (TTB), Treasury after reviewing the petitions submitted in 2007 by the Paso Robles American Viticultural Area Committee (PRAVAC) to establish 11 new viticultural areas located entirely within the existing 669,253-acre (1,046 sq mi) Paso Robles viticultural area adjacent to the northern boundary of San Luis Obispo County. The proposed viticultural areas are: Adelaida District, Creston District, El Pomar District, Paso Robles Estrella District, Paso Robles Geneseo District, Paso Robles Highlands District, Paso Robles Willow Creek District, San Juan Creek, San Miguel District, Santa Margarita Ranch, and Templeton Gap District.

The Paso Robles Estrella District viticultural area is located in the north-central portion of the Paso Robles viticultural area, northeast of the city of Paso Robles centered around the town of Estrella. Generally, the Estrella District occupies the area east of U.S. 101 and north of SR 46 bisected by the Estrella River watershed. The AVA boundary is generally shaped like a triangle, with its apex pointed at the San Luis Obispo–Monterey County line. The location of the viticultural area is in the same general region as the 1844 La Estrella Land Grant, which was made by the Mexican governor to the Salinan Indians who resided in the Mission San Miguel locale. The northern portion of the Paso Robles Estrella District viticultural area boundary follows a segment of the shared San Luis Obispo County and Monterey County boundary which is also outlines the northern portion of the Paso Robles AVA. Beyond the northern boundary are steep canyons, which contrast with the valleys and terraces of the area. The northeastern portion of the boundary extends diagonally southeast from the San Luis Obispo County line at Ranchito Canyon to Shedd Canyon on the Estrella River following straight lines between peaks in the Temblor Range that roughly separate the viticultural area from the steeper and more arid terrain to the east not included in any of the proposed viticultural areas named in the petitions. The southeastern portion of the boundary follows an intermittent stream in Shedd Canyon to a section line that is used to define part of the viticultural area's southern boundary. The southeastern portion of the boundary of the Estrella District viticultural area is shared with the northwestern portion of the boundary of the San Juan Creek viticultural area.

== History ==
California's rich history began with Spanish and Mexican governments creating concessions through land grants from the late 1700s to mid-1800s. These Ranchos of the Californios were largely responsible for much of the naming of rivers, mountains, and large areas of land throughout what would eventually be the 31st state in 1850. The first record of the name "Estrella" applying to the area east and northeast of what is now downtown City of Paso Robles appeared on the diseño of Mission San Miguel in the 1840s. "Estrella," (/esˈtɾeʎa/ es-TRE-ya) or "star" in Spanish, gains its name because of the interesting pattern made by some ridgelines. George H. Derby, in 1852, wrote: "The peculiarity of the divergence of these four valleys, and their corresponding ridges from this point resembling the rays of a star, has given its very appropriate name – Estrella." The river that runs past this intersection point descends from the east into the Salinas River near the Mission San Miguel, also received the name "Estrella," thus beginning this area's history as the Estrella District. Eventually, as farmers and homesteaders moved to the region, the town of Estrella was founded in 1886 and appears on an early San Luis Obispo County map, dated 1887, which also identifies a broad area east and west along the Estrella River as the "Estrella Valley." Historian Loren Nicholson recounts in 1886 a similar tale of settlement in Paso Robles Estrella District:

For a long time during the early American period, the land to the east of the mission was vaguely assumed by people of the county to be part of a Mexican land grant. It isn't known who deserves credit for discovering that all of this land belonged to the government and was open for settlement, but a migration of settlers began during the 1870s. Land along the Salinas River and along Estrella Creek was taken up first. There were soon enough people in the Estrella district to build a school and a protestant church. Three thousand acres of wheat and barley was sown upon the Estrella plains in 1879, but the results were poor. Even though some gave up, there were still forty families in the Estrella district in 1880.

At its pinnacle, the town of Estrella had four stores, three churches, a blacksmith and a livery barn for the stage. The town had hoped to become a shipping center for produce and grain, but no direct or connecting rail line were ever built to the town of Estrella, and the population gradually moved away to the surrounding countryside or to the larger towns that developed along the main transportation routes, such as San Miguel, Templeton and Paso Robles. The arrival of the railroad to San Miguel was critical to such settlement in the "Estrella District" as noted by Nicholson:

On October 1, 1886, a writer for the San Luis Obispo Tribune who lived in the Estrella District a few miles east of Mission San Miguel reported that he and his neighbors could hear heavy blasting along the proposed route of Southern Pacific...Just the fact that the railroad was that close after so long, yet so far away, had caused both hope and despair in San Luis Obispo County. Raising crops or large herds of cattle or sheep was meaningless as long as it remained difficult – in fact nearly impossible – to get products to San Francisco and Los Angeles markets."

When the town of Estrella was founded, one of its founders surely did not envision that the area surrounding the town would become an important wine region, in fact, he sought to make Estrella a dry town. When surveyed in 1886, two men, Gordanier and Moody, owned the land underlying the town. A special stipulation was written into the deed for the town: "That no vinous beverages nor spirituous malt or other intoxicating liquid shall be manufactured, sold, or kept for sale on the Gordanier side of town," and a "Division Street" was established to identify the boundary between the wet and dry sides of the town. Agriculture has remained the driver of the economy in the Paso Robles Estrella District since its early times. Today, the economy of Paso Robles Estrella District is driven by its viticulture industry.

== Terroir ==
=== Topography ===
Elevations within the Paso Robles Estrella District viticultural area vary from 745 to 1,819 ft (227–554 m). A series of northeast-to-southwest canyons with intermittent streams and long, narrow valley floors dominate much of the northern and eastern terrain, with elevations ranging from 1,100 to 1,600 ft (335–488 m). Elevations within the viticultural area gradually decrease to the west and south as the terrain transitions to floodplains, terraces, benches, and gently rolling hills preserved from old river deposits at elevations generally between 700 and 1,000 ft (213–305 m). Vineyard elevations generally vary from 750 to 1,000 ft (229–305 m), with some higher vineyards located north of the Estrella River at elevations of up to 1,400 feet (427 m) in the Temblor Range. The valley fill of the Paso Robles Estrella District viticultural area is deep and supports the Paso Robles groundwater basin, fed by runoff from the surrounding mountain slopes and the Estrella River. The deep groundwater basin provides abundant water for irrigation within the viticultural area. The geographical location of the Estrella River valley and the surrounding topography combine to create a distinctive climate within the Paso Robles Estrella District viticultural area. Maritime sea breezes enter the region through the Templeton Gap and other low spots in the crest of the Santa Lucia Range to the west; occasional sea breezes flowing from Monterey Bay southward along the Salinas River Valley also provide marine influences. As a result, the Estrella River watershed incurs year-round winds, predominantly from the west, that blow through its connecting valleys and canyons. In addition, the topography within the Paso Robles Estrella District viticultural area causes cold air to drain from higher elevations downward to the Estrella River, and this cold air drainage can cause early morning fog in the summer.

=== Climate ===
Growing season temperatures in the Paso Robles Estrella District viticultural area are generally warmer than those of the more western grape-growing regions within the Paso Robles viticultural area, but are generally cooler than those of the eastern and southern regions of the Paso Robles viticultural area. The viticultural area has a moderate Winkler Region III climate, with approximately 3,300 GDD units. The petition notes that moderate Region III climates are well suited for growing a number of Bordeaux varieties of winegrapes, including Cabernet Sauvignon, as well as Rhone varieties like Syrah. During the growing season, sea breezes occur when the land surface is warmer than the waters of the Pacific Ocean, creating a vacuum to draw the cooling breezes through the gaps in the crest of the Santa Lucia Range and into the viticultural area. In addition, sea breezes occasionally travel south from Monterey Bay via the Salinas River valley to the viticultural area. The viticultural area's temperatures are also influenced by night-time cold air drainage from the higher slopes of the surrounding Santa Lucia Range, Temblor Range, and Huerhuero Hills; this cold air drainage occasionally results in early morning fog within the viticultural area during the summer. The Santa Lucia Range, located between the Pacific Ocean and the Paso Robles area, creates a rain shadow effect for the viticultural area, with lesser shadow effects occurring from the La Panza Range to the south and the Temblor Range to the northeast. Precipitation in the Paso Robles Estrella District viticultural area varies between 12.5 and 15.5 in (317.5–393.7 mm) annually, with the majority of precipitation occurring during the winter.

=== Soils ===
The soil textures of the Paso Robles Estrella District viticultural area are predominantly sandy loams along the creeks and gravelly sandy loams and clay loams above on the poorly consolidated Paso Robles Formation of the river terraces and hillsides. The most common soil orders of the Paso Robles Estrella District viticultural area are the well developed and older Alfisols on higher terraces and the moderately developed grassland Mollisols, followed by younger, poorly developed Inceptisols and Entisols along the creeks and on some hillsides, and heavy clay Vertisols on some old terraces. The soils of the Paso Robles Estrella District viticultural area have low to modest values of major plant nutrients, moderate soil rooting depths, moderate water stress, and have low to moderate fertility. The combination of the region's climate with its deep alluvial, mostly terrace soils (some of which are partially cemented by clays, iron, silicates and carbonates) creates moderate vigor vineyards. Soils are generally well-drained near the surface, but with varying water-holding capacity as texture and structure changes to depth in the profile, and from the younger to older geomorphic surfaces. Most of the soils are slightly acidic at the surface (with pH values of 6.0 to 7.1) and more alkaline at depth (with pH values of 7.2 to 8.3).

== Viticulture ==
Estrella District has become an important region for California viticulture. Its growth has been critical to the growth of the Paso Robles wine country and is the site of some of the Paso Robles area's pioneering wineries and vineyards. One of the first wineries in the Paso Robles region, in fact, carried the name "Estrella." The Estrella River Winery was bonded in 1977 and was the first large-scale winery in San Luis Obispo County. The Estrella River Winery facility was later sold and renamed Meridian.

The viticultural importance of Paso Robles Estrella District also is evidenced by the fact that one of the first and most widely planted clones of the Syrah grape in California is named "Estrella." The "Estrella clone" is "named after the Estrella River Winery, which started its Syrah vineyard in 1975 with a clone cuttings from the Chapoutier family vineyard in Hermitage. Other large vineyards and wineries were established in Paso Robles Estrella District in the 1980s. In 1988, J. Lohr Winery expanded into Paso Robles to focus on Cabernet Sauvignon, Merlot, Syrah and other red varietals. Many mid-size wineries were also established during this period. Paso Robles Estrella District is now home to numerous large wineries and many more recently establish smaller, boutique wineries. Such wineries today often refer to the location of their vineyards, or the source of their fruit, as being on the "Estrella bench" or "Estrella hills." Two vineyards and one winery located in the Paso Robles Estrella District bear the name "Estrella" – Estrella Creek Wines, Estrella River Vineyard and Estrella Valley Vineyard. The Paso Robles Estrella District viticultural area encompasses approximately 66,800 acres (104.4 sq mi). Today, Paso Robles Estrella District cultivates approximately 8,500 acres (3,400 ha) on 35 vineyards and at least 14 bonded wineries. The USDA plant hardiness zone is 8b to 9a.
