= Paso Robles Geneseo District AVA =

Appellation that designates wine in San Luis Obispo County, CA

Coordinates: 35°38′42″N 120°35′10″W

Paso Robles Geneseo District
- Wine region
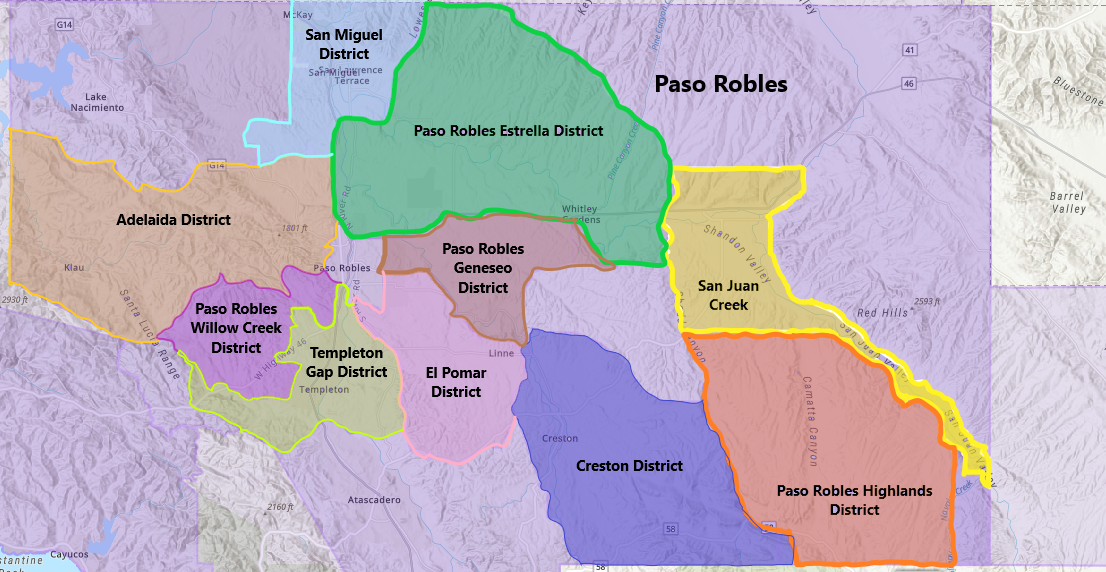
- Type: American Viticultural Area
- Year established: 2014
- Years of wine industry: 138
- Country: United States
- Part of: California, Central Coast AVA, San Luis Obispo County, Paso Robles AVA
- Other regions in California, Central Coast AVA, San Luis Obispo County, Paso Robles AVA: Adelaida District AVA, Creston District AVA, El Pomar District AVA, Paso Robles Estrella District AVA, Paso Robles Highlands District AVA, Paso Robles Willow Creek District AVA, San Miguel District AVA, San Juan Creek AVA, Santa Margarita Ranch AVA, Templeton Gap District AVA
- Growing season: 214 days
- Climate region: Region III-IV
- Heat units: 3,300 GDD units
- Precipitation (annual average): 13 to 14 inches (330–360 mm)
- Soil conditions: Well-developed moderate depth residual and alluvial soils, with silty clays and silty clay loam textures; pH varied, but mostly acidic.
- Total area: 17,300 acres (27 sq mi)
- Size of planted vineyards: 3,000 acres (1,200 ha)
- No. of vineyards: 21
- Grapes produced: Cabernet Franc, Cabernet Sauvignon, Grenache, Merlot, Mourvèdre, Syrah, Zinfandel
- No. of wineries: 16

Paso Robles Geneseo District is an American Viticultural Area (AVA) located in San Luis Obispo County, California and within the multi-county Central Coast AVA. It was established as the nation's 221^{st}, the state's 137^{th} and the county's tenth appellation on October 9, 2014, by the Alcohol and Tobacco Tax and Trade Bureau (TTB), Treasury after reviewing the petitions submitted in 2007 by the Paso Robles American Viticultural Area Committee (PRAVAC) to establish 11 new viticultural areas located entirely within the existing 669,253-acre (1,046 sq mi) Paso Robles viticultural area adjacent to the northern boundary of San Luis Obispo County. The proposed viticultural areas were: Adelaida District, Creston District, El Pomar District, Paso Robles Estrella District, Paso Robles Geneseo District, Paso Robles Highlands District, Paso Robles Willow Creek District, San Juan Creek, San Miguel District, Santa Margarita Ranch, and Templeton Gap District.

Paso Robles Geneseo District viticultural area is located in the central portion of the Paso Robles viticultural area, adjacent to the eastern boundary of the city of Paso Robles and extends east along SR 46 as its northern boundary to terraces along the Estrella River. The 17,300-acre (27 sq mi) viticultural area continues to extend on a southeastern diagonal along a portion of Huerhuero Creek bordering the El Pomar District AVA and the northern tip of the Creston District AVA. The name "Geneseo" is recognized as the name of viticultural significance, due to its extensive historical use to the rural community. Locals understand the term "Geneseo" to refer to the area of the Geneseo District.

== History ==
The Geneseo District (/dʒəˈnɛsi.oʊ/ jen-uh-SEE-oh) was named after the community of Geneseo, Illinois, from which many of the original settlers in the area emigrated. The historian Wallace V. Ohles recounts the area's origins:

By 1884, there were three families in the Geneseo District: those of Charles Pepmiller, the Herts and the Gruenhagens. Mr. Pepmiller sent an advertisement to the Geneseo Republic, the newspaper in the community of Geneseo, Illinois. The ad stated that 3,000 acres of land were available near the Heur Huero River. Following the publication of that ad, families were attracted from Kansas, Illinois, Wisconsin and even from Denmark. Among the newcomers were the Martin, William and John Ernst families. The name Geneseo comes from Geneseo, Illinois, their former home.

Many of the early settlers in Geneseo District were German speaking. Barbara Mathis, for example, emigrated to the United States from the Alsace region in Europe in 1868 and eventually settled in Geneseo, Illinois. There, she married William Ernst, and the two of them moved to the new settlement of Geneseo in San Luis Obispo County in 1884. The early settlers founded a school, named the Geneseo School. Geneseo School was located 11 miles east of Paso Robles, at the northwest corner of Creston Road and Geneseo Road. The location of the Geneseo School is identified on the U.S.G.S. quadrangle maps submitted in the petition. The Geneseo school district covered the area settled by the group of German immigrants in the 1880s and was one of the early school districts of San Luis Obispo County. The first classes at the Geneseo school were held on the ranch of one of the immigrant families. A farm building on the Ernst ranch was the original Geneseo school. The small schoolhouse became too small, so in 1886, a larger one was built just opposite the original building with volunteer labor. The new one-room schoolhouse had an anteroom, two storage rooms and a covered porch. Later, a bell tower was added. The call for settlers that had been placed in the Geneseo, Illinois newspaper also stated "we need a few families to help start a Lutheran Church – good farm land." The Geneseo schoolhouse was the original site of congregation for church services, as well as confirmations, baptisms and weddings. Just over ten years after the new Geneseo school building was built, a new simple wooden church was built on land just north of the school. The San Luis Obispo Morning Tribune in 1897 included the following article, anno|uncing the dedication of the new church:

The German Lutherans have erected a fine church building this present fall, near the Geneseo school house, at the German settlement. The building is all finished and appropriately furnished, and the dedication services dedicating the house to religious worship will be held on Sunday, December the 12th, 1897. The following named noted divines are expected to take leading parts in the dedicatory services, Reverend J.M. Beuler, of San Francisco, and Reverend J.M. Denninger, of San Jose. The morning dedicatory services will commence at 10 o'clock a.m. and be conducted in the German language. Services in the afternoon at 2 o'clock will be in the English language. Evening service in the German language at 7:30. A good attendance is expected.

Geneseo District, like the other small rural enclaves in San Luis Obispo County, suffered from declining population as the City of Paso Robles and other larger towns in the region grew. By 1924, the rural population and school attendance of the area had decreased to the point that the Linné school, which served a small Swedish settlement to the west of Geneseo, was merged with the Geneseo school. The Linné schoolhouse was moved to the Geneseo school grounds and it was used there as a community center. By 1962, the Geneseo school itself had to close its doors and the Geneseo District merged with the Paso Robles school district. The schoolhouse was moved to a nearby ranch in Creston until 2004 when the schoolhouse was moved again, to the Paso Robles Pioneer Museum, where it is preserved today as a reminder of the Paso Robles region's early days. Today, the Geneseo District is thriving once again due to the growth of the Paso Robles wine industry and the influx of new vineyards and wineries.

== Terroir ==
=== Topography ===
The landscape of the Paso Robles Geneseo District viticultural area contains the older terraces of the Estrella River, a portion of Huerhuero Creek, Huerhuero Hills terraces, and upfaulted hills. The merging of the old river terraces and uplifted Huerhuero Hills, coupled with erosion by Huerhuero Creek and its tributaries, has created a set of higher elevation rolling hill slopes above the lower elevation valley floor. As a result, the landscape contains the appearance of hills that bulge, or bubble, upward from the valley floor. The terraces trend in a west-southwest to east-northeast direction as a flight of step-like surfaces with increasing elevations. The highest and oldest terraces of the Estrella River are located in this region and have elevations of 900 to 1,050 ft (270–320 m); a small section of second terraces of 860 to 880 ft (260–270 m) in elevation is situated in the northwestern corner of the viticultural area, east of the city of Paso Robles.
Elevations within the Paso Robles Geneseo District viticultural area range from approximately 740 feet (230 m) along Huerhuero Creek in the north to approximately 1,300 feet (400 m) in the southeast. Vineyard elevations in the region generally vary from 880 to 1,200 ft (270–370 m), with a few vineyards located on the higher eastern hills. The topography of the Paso Robles Geneseo District viticultural area has a strong influence on the growing conditions in the area. The hillside and hilltop vineyards of the Geneseo District viticultural area expose the grapevines to the cooling influence of the winds and sea breezes that enter the region through gaps in the crest of the Santa Lucia Range. The hillside and hilltop vineyards also are protected from frost, because cold air drains off of the high slopes of the viticultural area at night and into the lower elevation valleys.

=== Climate ===
The climate of the Paso Robles Geneseo District viticultural area is influenced by marine incursion, thermal mixing of the air across hill tops, and cold air drainage from hill slopes. In the summer and fall, cool marine air travels inland and eastward over the crest of the Santa Lucia Range through the Templeton Gap and into the Geneseo District viticultural area. Occasional incursions of marine air can also travel southward along the Salinas River from Monterey Bay and reach the hills of the Geneseo District. At night, cool air drains off of the hillsides and vineyards of the viticultural area and into lower elevations outside of the area. Because of this cold air drainage, frost and cold air ponding are rare within the Paso Robles Geneseo District viticultural area, except along small sections of the Huerhuero Creek channel. Precipitation amounts average 13 to 14 in (330–360 mm) annually. The Winkler climate classification system classifies the Paso Robles Geneseo District viticultural area as a warm Region III–IV transitional climate, with approximately 3,500 Growing degree-day (GDD) units. (Daily temperature records and GDD data were gathered from 2002 through 2006 at the 980-foot elevation weather station of the Jerry Reaugh Branch Vineyard.) The petition notes that a warm Region III–IV transitional climate is well suited for growing Bordeaux varieties of winegrapes, including Merlot and Cabernet Sauvignon, as well as Rhone varieties like Syrah and Zinfandel. The USDA plant hardiness zone is 8b to 9a.

=== Soils ===
The soils of the Paso Robles Geneseo District viticultural area have shallow to moderate rooting depths, moderate water stress, and modest to low nutrient levels. Area soils tend to be cemented by carbonates and silicates, which provides reduced rooting depths and moderate water holding capacity, drainage, and vigor. The Huerhuero Hills soils within the Paso Robles Geneseo District viticultural area are generally residual, silty clay, and silty clay loam soils weathered from the moderately consolidated Paso Robles Formation, with small stringers of sandy soils located immediately along the Huerhuero Creek channel. The soil series form a topographical sequence of types by slope position, from ridge-crest to shoulder-slope, mid-slope, foot-slope, and toe-slope. The Huerhuero residual soils are primarily Mollisols with darker and more organically rich horizons, leached at the surface. Many of the hilltop soils are high in calcium and have a pH typically 7.9 to 8.4 throughout. The alluvial terrace soils are generally acidic at the surface with pH of 5.6 to 6.5, increasing at depth to an alkaline 8.4.

== Viticulture ==
Viticulture in the Geneseo District goes back to at least the late 1800s and can be traced back to its earliest settlers. Large plantings were first made in the 1970s, but major growth in Geneseo District viticulture, like much of the Paso Robles wine region, did not come until the early 1980s. Gary Eberle, one of the region's pioneers, opened his own winery in the Geneseo District in the early 1980s. Eberle began his career in the wine industry in 1973 by heading his family's Estrella River Winery. In 1983, he opened Eberle Winery, with the premiere of his 1979 Cabernet Sauvignon, and today Eberle Winery produces over 25,000 cases of wine each year.

In 1982, Arciero Vineyards/EOS Estate Winery, now with over 700 acres (280 ha) and production at 160,000 cases, pioneered the planting of several premium Italian varietals in the Paso Robles region. Steinbeck Vineyards, operated by descendants of the original settlers of the Geneseo District, planted its first vineyards in 1982 as well. The original 50 acres (20 ha) estate planted by Howie and Bev Steinbeck produces an old vine Cabernet on land originally settled by Frank Ernst, the son of William Ernst. Over time, Steinbeck planted additional acreage and purchased adjacent properties. Today, Steinbeck Vineyards consists of 500 acres (200 ha) of wine grapes.

These early pioneers also influenced the more recent development of viticulture and winemaking in the Geneseo District. Tobin James, who trained under Gary Eberle, bought the land for his own winery in the northeast portion of Geneseo District, 1.5 mi (2.4 km) east of the junction of Geneseo Road and Highway 46, in 1994. Robert Hall, with Howie Steinbeck's advice, bought the land for his Red Tail Vineyard in 1995. Numerous small, boutique wineries also have been established in Geneseo District in the last 10 years. Penman Springs Vineyard was established in 1996, Rio Seco Vineyards was planted in 1997, Clautiere Vineyard and Chumeia Vineyards were established in 1999, Gelfand Vineyards was established in 2001 and Cass Winery was The Geneseo District viticultural area encompasses an area of approximately 17,300 acres (27.0 sq mi). Today, Geneseo District is home to approximately 3,000 acres (1,200 ha) throughout 21 vineyards and at least 16 bonded wineries.
