= Paso Robles Willow Creek District AVA =

Appellation that designates wine in San Luis Obispo County, CA

Coordinates: 35°35′49″N 120°49′51″W

Paso Robles Willow Creek District
- Wine region
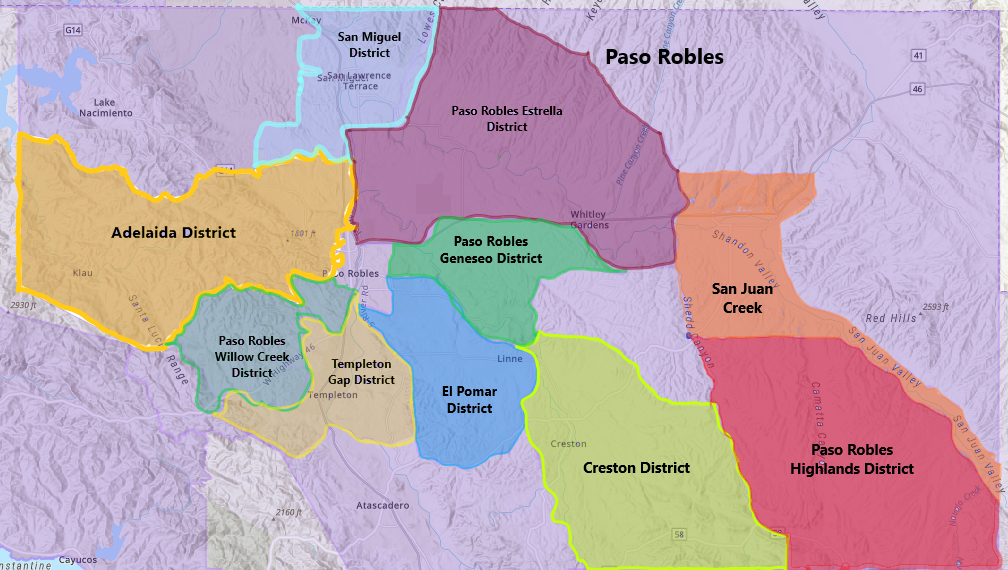
- Type: American Viticultural Area
- Year established: 2014
- Years of wine industry: 138
- Country: United States
- Part of: California, Central Coast AVA, San Luis Obispo County, Paso Robles AVA
- Other regions in California, Central Coast AVA, San Luis Obispo County, Paso Robles AVA: Adelaida District AVA, Creston District AVA, El Pomar District AVA, Paso Robles Estrella District AVA, Paso Robles Geneseo District AVA, Paso Robles Highlands District AVA, San Juan Creek AVA, San Miguel District AVA, Santa Margarita Ranch AVA, Templeton Gap District AVA
- Growing season: 231 days
- Climate region: Region II
- Heat units: 2,900 GDD units
- Precipitation (annual average): 24 to 30 in (610–760 mm)
- Soil conditions: Weathered calcareous shale fragments, Calodo-Linne alkaline clay loams, Nacimiento-Ayar-Diablo clay loams, Ryer and Rincon clays and clay loams, and Croply and Gazos clays
- Total area: 16,622 acres (26 sq mi)
- Size of planted vineyards: 1,400 acres (570 ha)
- No. of vineyards: 38
- Grapes produced: Cabernet Sauvignon, Chenin Blanc, Grenache Blanc,Marsanne, Mourvedre, Petite Sirah, Roussanne, Syrah, Valdigue, Zinfandel
- No. of wineries: 40

Paso Robles Willow Creek District is an American Viticultural Area (AVA) located in San Luis Obispo County, California and lies within the multi-county Central Coast AVA. It was established as the nation's 223^{rd}, the state's 139^{th} and the county's twelfth appellation on October 9, 2014 by the Alcohol and Tobacco Tax and Trade Bureau (TTB), Treasury after reviewing the petitions submitted in 2007 by the Paso Robles American Viticultural Area Committee (PRAVAC) to establish 11 new viticultural areas located entirely within the existing 669,253-acre (1,046 sq mi) Paso Robles viticultural area adjacent to the northern boundary of San Luis Obispo County. The proposed viticultural areas were: Adelaida District, Creston District, El Pomar District, Paso Robles Estrella District, Paso Robles Geneseo District, Paso Robles Highlands District, Paso Robles Willow Creek District, San Juan Creek, San Miguel District, Santa Margarita Ranch, and Templeton Gap District.

The Paso Robles Willow Creek District viticultural area is located west of Highway 101 and also the towns of Paso Robles and Templeton which are on its route. It is sandwiched between the viticultural areas of Adelaida District to the north and the Templeton Gap District to the south, while its western boundary abuts the Santa Lucia Range which also outlines Paso Robles viticultural area's western border. Willow Creek also is the name of the central geographic feature that dominates its landscape. The distinguishing features of the Paso Robles Willow Creek District viticultural area include a strong marine influence, an average annual precipitation of 24 to 30 inches (610–760 mm), a cool Winkler Region II growing season climate, and a mountainous landscape with elevations of 960 to 1,900 feet (290–580 m).

== Name Evidence ==
The name "Paso Robles Willow Creek District" refers to the Willow Creek watershed and a small rural enclave in the center of the viticultural area. Local residents refer to the region in which the viticultural area is located as the "Willow Creek District." Willow Creek, an intermittent stream and tributary of Paso Robles Creek identified on the USGS York Mountain map, is a dominant geographical feature of the viticultural area. The USGS York Mountain map also identifies Willow Creek Road, which runs in a northwest-to-southeast direction through the Paso Robles Willow Creek District viticultural area. (The petition notes that the road identified as "Willow Creek" on the USGS York Mountain map is now known as "Vineyard Drive"; the roughly parallel mountain road to the east, unnamed on the York Mountain map, is now known as "Willow Creek Road." The petition includes a map, from the "SanLuisObispoCounty.com" Web site, which identifies each road by its current name.) The 2001 Automobile Club of Southern California's San Luis Obispo County map also shows Willow Creek and Willow Creek Road within the Paso Robles Willow Creek District viticultural area. In addition, news articles in local publications use the "Willow Creek" name for the region within the viticultural area. For example, a March 17, 2007 article entitled "Hands-On Hobby" in The San Luis Obispo Tribune discusses winemaker Charlie Poalillo and his "Willow Creek grape-growing business," and an article entitled "Paso Robles Boy Has His Wish Fulfilled Saturday" in the June 22, 2005 Paso Robles Press discusses a young Make–A–Wish Foundation recipient who is described as living on his family's Willow Creek area ranch. Local organizations also use the name "Willow Creek" to refer to the geographical region of the viticultural area. An undated flyer for the annual Paso Robles Pioneer Day celebration includes a regional map that identifies Willow Creek in the area of the viticultural area, and the Web site for the local Wine and Steins Club states that the group started in 1979 in the Willow Creek area of rural Paso Robles. Also, the Willow Creek Mennonite Church has existed within the viticultural area since 1954. Further, the "Willow Creek" name is used by some local wineries to more specifically describe the location of their vineyards in the Paso Robles viticultural area, according to wine marketing materials provided with the petition. For example, the Villa Creek Cellars 2007 spring release notes provide information on their 2005 Willow Creek Cuve´e, and Stephen's Cellar and Vineyard explains that their 2003 Pinot Noir grapes were grown in the Willow Creek area.

== Boundary Evidence ==
The northern portion of the boundary of the Paso Robles Willow Creek District follows a rugged, mountainous ridgeline and eventually descends eastward to the Salinas River floodplain. The northern portion of the boundary follows roads, intermittent streams, and the city limits of Paso Robles as marked on the provided USGS Templeton map. This boundary is shared with the southern boundary of the Adelaida District viticultural area and separates the cool, mountainous Paso Robles Willow Creek District viticultural area from the warmer, less mountainous Adelaida District viticultural area. The eastern portion of the boundary of the Paso Robles Willow Creek District viticultural area follows roads, streams, and range lines to separate the viticultural area from the gently sloping landscape that descends toward lower elevations to the east. The eastern and southeastern portion of the boundary is based on the transition from the soft Monterey Formation rock within the viticultural area, which contributes to the region's distinct terroir, to bedrock-alluvial contact to the east. The area immediately to the east of the Paso Robles Willow Creek District viticultural area includes the city of Paso Robles and a portion of the Templeton Gap District viticultural area. The southern and southwestern portions of the Paso Robles Willow Creek District viticultural area boundary follow various roads, streams, section and range lines, and straight lines between marked points on USGS maps to approximately follow the contact of the less resistant Monterey Formation units in the Paso Robles Willow Creek District viticultural area, with a more resistant unit of the Monterey Formation to the south. The Templeton Gap District viticultural area is located immediately to the south. The western portion of the Paso Robles Willow Creek District viticultural area boundary follows the Paso de Robles Land Grant and mountain roads. The boundary in this area is shared with the Paso Robles viticultural area boundary and separates both the viticultural area and the Paso Robles viticultural area from the higher, more rugged mountain terrain of the York Mountain viticultural area to the west.

== History ==
The Willow Creek District, for well over 100 years, has been the home of vineyards, Mennonite families, and walnut orchards. Its history is similar to that of various other early rural communities in San Luis Obispo County. A sparse population lived in the area since at least the mid to late-1800s; that population declined as nearby towns located along major transportation routes increased in size. Paso Robles Willow Creek District has begun more recently to grow once again, largely as a result of the flourishing wine and vineyard industry in the Paso Robles area. Residents of Willow Creek have always based their livelihood on agriculture and ranching. The drivers of settlement in the viticultural area were those commonly found in rural and agricultural areas: inexpensive land and favorable weather. The historian J. Fraser MacGillivray describes the motivations of early settlers as follows: "The southwest portion of the 26,000-acre (41 sq mi) Rancho Paso de Robles offered some attractive features. The land had been subdivided into affordable parcels. The soil and more plentiful rainfall seemed to present fewer risks."
The Paso Robles Willow Creek District viticultural area is located along the western boundary of the Rancho Paso de Robles. Some of the early settlers in Willow Creek District were Mennonites. A Mennonite church had been built along San Marcos Creek, just upstream from Chimney Rock, to the north of the Paso Robles Willow Creek District viticultural area. Many of the Mennonites that attended the church along San Marcos Creek moved south to the southwest corner of the Rancho Paso de Robles; eventually, the church, including the church building itself, would follow the settlers. The San Marcos Mennonite Church was dismantled into sections and hauled to the Willow Creek area. The church became known as the Willow Creek Mennonite Church and was in service until it burned in January 1967. The higher relative rainfall in the Paso Robles Willow Creek District has affected agriculture there throughout its history. In the early 1900s, when the region was encouraging settlers to move to the Paso Robles area – the "Cream of California's Almond District" – walnuts became the major crop in Willow Creek District. One historian recounts: "In our dry land areas, which most of the local fruit and nut acreage was and still is, walnuts became the major tree crop. They were produced mainly west of Highway 101 in the Adelaida, Willow Creek and Templeton areas because of the higher rainfall." Since that time, wine grapes have become the primary agricultural crop of the Paso Robles Willow Creek District.

== Terroir ==
=== Topography ===
The Paso Robles Willow Creek District viticultural area is a relatively high elevation, mountainous area of the Santa Lucia Range located in the western part of the Paso Robles viticultural area. The area's location and topography create its distinctively cool climate, which, in turn, affects viticulture within the area. The topography is largely defined by three small tributaries of Paso Robles Creek that run north-to-south down mountainsides into Paso Robles Creek: Willow Creek, Sheepcamp Creek, and Jack Creek. These creeks have eroded the hillsides of the viticultural area, creating a mountain terroir of bedrock slopes. Jack Creek is located just inside the western portion of the boundary, with Sheepcamp Creek to its east. Willow Creek is further to the east near the center of the viticultural area, dominating its landscape.
Elevations in the Paso Robles Willow Creek District viticultural area range from 1,900 ft (580 m) along the high ridges of the northern portion of the boundary to 960 ft (290 m) at the bedrock-alluvium contact to the east. Most of the vineyards within the Paso Robles Willow Creek District viticultural area are planted at elevations between 1,000 to 1,300 ft (300–400 m), with many on south to southeast-facing aspects, in order to benefit from the cool marine air that enters the viticultural area from the south. The steep slopes have high erosion potential, which is often controlled though the planting of cover crops.

=== Climate ===
The climate of the Paso Robles Willow Creek District has significant maritime influence due to its location near gaps in the crest of the Santa Lucia Range and its high elevations. As a result, this viticultural area is wetter and cooler than other regions of the Paso Robles viticultural area, with 24 to 30 in (610–760 mm) of annual rainfall, frequent fog, and persistent sea breezes. Daily, monthly, and annual temperature ranges are less pronounced in this viticultural area, and it is less affected by cold air drainage than most other regions of the Paso Robles viticultural area. This cooler climate is seen in the Paso Robles Willow Creek District viticultural area's Winkler Region II climate classification of approximately 2,900 GDDs of growing season heat accumulation. The cool climate of the Paso Robles Willow Creek District viticultural area increases the ripening period for grapes, resulting in longer hang-time to develop flavors, with harvest dates approximately two to three weeks later than in other parts of the Paso Robles viticultural area. In addition, the higher annual precipitation in the viticultural area results in thicker natural vegetation, which increases the input of humus to soils and allows viticulturally beneficial topsoils to develop on many slopes. The USDA plant hardiness zone is 8b to 9a.

=== Soils ===
The parent materials of the soils of the Paso Robles Willow Creek District viticultural area are the soft marine shales, mudstones, siltstones and sandstones of the Monterey Formation, as well as small pockets of the poorly consolidated Paso Robles Formation. Benches along the small creeks are covered with alluvial sediments. Soil orders include Mollisols (where surface humus is abundant under woodlands) and younger, poorly developed Entisols on steep slopes. Occasionally Vertisols occur on very old geomorphic surfaces where pedogenic clays dominate the soil profile. Soil textures are predominantly shaly clays, clay loams, and rocky loams, with some units gravelly. Soils are alkaline at depth, with pH values commonly between 7.8 and 8.9. The soils in the Paso Robles Willow Creek District viticultural area have modest nutrient values and low to moderate water holding capacity, and are considered moderately fertile (although, in this mountainous region, fertility is also a function of slope stability, which influences soil depth). These soil characteristics create challenging conditions for winegrapes, and low yields are common for vineyards within the Paso Robles Willow Creek District viticultural area.

== Viticulture ==
Wine grapes have been grown in Paso Robles Willow Creek District since the late 1800s. Various early settlers of Paso Robles Willow Creek District planted small vineyards along with grain, nut and other fruit crops. One of the earliest bonded wineries in the Paso Robles region is located in Paso Robles Willow Creek District. The Pesenti Winery, bonded in 1934 shortly after the Repeal of Prohibition, originally concentrated on regional sales of jug wine, including Zinfandel from vines planted on the estate in the 1920s. Today, the original Pesenti Winery is the home of Turley Wine Cellars, which focuses on high-end Zinfandel wines from old vine vineyards. Paso Robles Willow Creek District viticulture has grown tremendously along with the rest of the Paso Robles region. There is a high concentration of small, boutique wineries and vineyards in Paso Robles Willow Creek District, including Booker, L'Aventure, Clos Solène, Saxum Vineyards, Jack Creek Cellars, Opolo, Jada Vineyard & Winery, Linne Calodo, Turley Wine Cellars and Denner Vineyards. Paso Robles Willow Creek viticultural area encompasses an area of approximately 21,300 acres (33.3 sq mi) cultivating approximately 1,400 acres (570 ha) under vine with over 40 bonded wineries.
