= San Luis Obispo County wine =

Appellation that designates wine in San Luis Obispo County, CA

Coordinates: 35°13′04″N 120°36′27″W

San Luis Obispo County
- Wine region
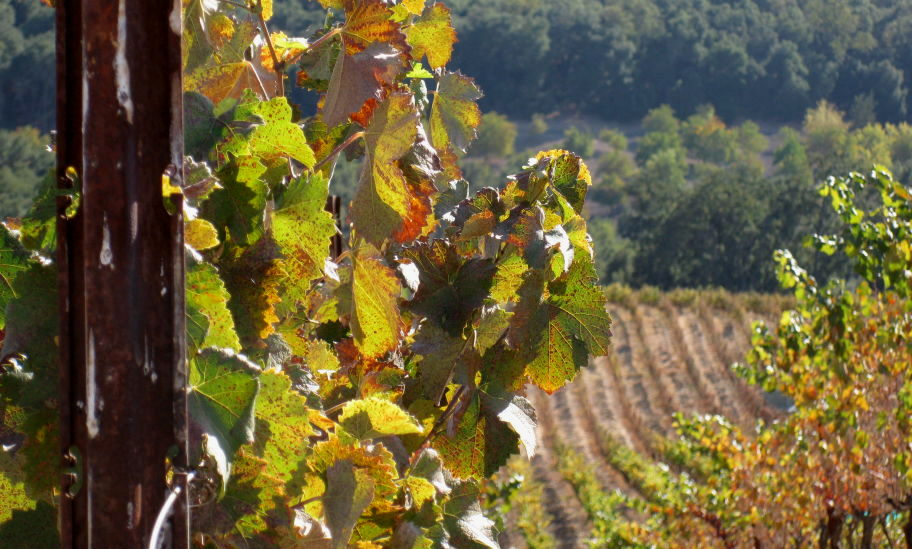
- SLO County vineyard
- Other names: SLO County
- Type: U.S. County Appellation
- Years of wine industry: 225
- Country: United States
- Part of: California, Central Coast AVA
- Other regions in California, Central Coast AVA: Monterey County, Santa Barbara County
- Sub-regions: Paso Robles AVA, Adelaida District AVA, Creston District AVA, El Pomar District AVA, Paso Robles Estrella District AVA, Paso Robles Geneseo District AVA, Paso Robles Highlands District AVA, Paso Robles Willow Creek District AVA, San Juan Creek AVA, Santa Margarita Ranch AVA, Santa Maria Valley AVA, Templeton Gap District AVA, York Mountain AVA, Edna Valley AVA, Arroyo Grande Valley AVA, San Luis Obispo (SLO) Coast AVA
- Climate region: Region I-IV
- Soil conditions: Volcanic deposits mixed with sandy loam to clay rich
- Total area: 2,112,640 acres (3,301 sq mi)
- No. of vineyards: 78
- Grapes produced: Cabernet Franc, Cabernet Sauvignon, Chardonnay, Grenache, Lagrein, Merlot, Mourvedre, Nebbiolo, Petite Sirah, Pinot Gris, Pinot Noir, Petit Verdot, Riesling, Sangiovese, Syrah, Tempranillo, Zinfandel
- Varietals produced: over 51
- No. of wineries: 250

San Luis Obispo (SLO) County wine is a appellation that designates wine made from grapes grown in San Luis Obispo (SLO) County, California which is sandwiched between Santa Barbara County to the south and Monterey County at the northern boundary on the Pacific coast. Its location sits halfway between the cities of San Francisco and Los Angeles on the north–south axis of U.S. Route 101 and Pacific Coast Highway (PCH). The county lies entirely within the Central Coast viticultural area. County names in the United States automatically qualify as legal appellations of origin for wine produced from grapes grown in that county and do not require registration with the Alcohol and Tobacco Tax and Trade Bureau (TTB) of the Treasury Department. TTB was created in January 2003, when the Bureau of Alcohol, Tobacco and Firearms (ATF) was extensively reorganized under the provisions of the Homeland Security Act of 2002.

The term "SLO" is a historical and commonly used reference for the county and its county seat, San Luis Obispo, initials as well as a description of the region's relaxed culture. According to the U.S. Census Bureau, the county has a total area of 3,301 square miles (2,113,000 acres) of which 3,299 square miles (2,111,000 acres) is land and 317 square miles (820 km^{2}) (comprising 8.8%) is water. San Luis Obispo county is home to some of California's coolest winemaking areas similar to climatic influences as its northern counterparts, Napa and Sonoma counties. The proximity of the Pacific coastline to the viticultural areas of San Luis Obispo Coast (SLO) Coast, and at the county's southern end, Arroyo Grande Valley, influences their vineyards to the cool marine air.

The county is home to seventeen distinctive American Viticultural Areas (AVA) including its initial sub-appellation, Santa Maria Valley, which extends into Santa Barbara County, the spacious Paso Robles with its eleven sub-region AVAs, the diminutive neighbor, York Mountain and the elongated newcomer, San Luis Obispo (SLO) Coast.

== SLO Viticultural Areas _{As of 2025} ==
- York Mountain (Est. Aug 1983, 24,000 acres (38 sq mi)})
- Paso Robles (Est. Oct 1983, 614,000 acres (959 sq mi))
  - Adelaida District (all Est. Oct 2014, 53,100 acres (83 sq mi)))
  - Creston District (42,000 acres (66 sq mi)}
  - El Pomar District (213,000 acres (333 sq mi))
  - Paso Robles Estrella District (66,800 acres (104 sq mi))
  - Paso Robles Geneseo District (17,300 acres (27 sq mi))
  - Paso Robles Highlands District (60,300 acres (94 sq mi))
  - Paso Robles Willow Creek District (60,300 acres (94 sq mi))
  - San Juan Creek (26,000 acres (41 sq mi))
  - San Miguel District (18,500 acres (29 sq mi))
  - Santa Margarita Ranch (18,000 acres (28 sq mi))
  - Templeton Gap District (35,000 acres (55 sq mi))
- SLO Coast (Est. Mar 2022, 480,585 acres (751 sq mi))
  - Edna Valley (Est. May 1982, 22,400 acres (35 sq mi))
  - Arroyo Grande (Est. Jan 1990, 41,600 acres (65 sq mi))
- Santa Maria Valley (Est. Aug 1981, 97,483 acres (152 sq mi)) (shares w/Santa Barbara County)

== History ==
Despite conflicting accounts, the first recorded planting of a vineyard was probably by the Spanish Jesuit Missionary Eusebio Francisco Kino at Misión San Bruno in Baja California in 1683 implanting the first variety named "Misionéro." In 1779, Franciscan missionaries under the direction of the Spanish Father Junípero Serra planted California's first vineyard at Mission San Juan Capistrano. The mission's historical journals document that between May 1779 and 1781, the padres supervised six 'campesinos' from Baja California in planting 2,000 grapevines at the mission. These grapevines, Vitis vinifera, were originally transported by ship from Spain and later became known in the New World as Mission Grapes. The vines arrived in Mexico around the year 1540 and cuttings were planted throughout Mexico and spread north with Spanish explorers in the 1620s. Cuttings were later planted in 1769 at the site of the first mission founded in San Diego and dominated California wine production until about 1880.

The first winery in Alta California was built at San Juan Capistrano in 1783; both red and white wines (sweet and dry), brandy, and a port-like wine called Angelica were all produced from the Mission grape. Father Serra founded eight other California missions, hence, he has been called the "Father of California Wine." The county's historic landmark, "Mission San Luis Obispo de Tolosa" was founded September 1, 1772 by Father Serra in the current town of San Luis Obispo. The mission was named after Saint Louis of Anjou, the bishop of Toulouse, the namesake of the region and town. Father Serra sent an expedition down south from the capital of Alta California, Monterey, to build the San Luis Obispo mission. A cross was erected near San Luis Obispo Creek and Serra celebrated the first mass. Following the mass, Father Junípero Serra left the construction responsibilities to Father Jose Cavaller. The California Missions were developed over three decades that included structure construction, crops, livestock, vineyards, and wineries. Each site gradually came to its peak during the 1830s and 1840s. In the 1830s the Franciscans produced as much as 50,000 gallons of wine a year at the San Gabriel Mission, the fourth of 21 missions founded in California in 1771. The San Gabriel Mission, built from 1791 to 1805 using brick, mortar, and cut stone, is the oldest structure of its kind south of Monterey. The Franciscans planted the first working vineyard in California. A large "mother vine" that was planted in 1861 has grown to notable size and length. It is the same variety as the original vines brought from Spain and still produces fruit. However, there are no records of a vineyard or winemaking in San Luis Obispo prior to 1820s when over one hundred barrels of wine a year are recorded for Mission San Luis Obispo. Its vineyard became the mission system's largest after the Mission San Gabriel.

The oldest recorded residence in San Luis Obispo County is the Dana Adobe in Nipomo which was originally built on a Mexican land grant of nearly 38,000 acres (59 sq mi) and presented in 1837 to William Goodwin Dana, originally from Boston, Massachusetts, who named it Rancho Nipomo. Captain Dana, married Maria Josefa Carrillo in 1829, the daughter of the original Governor of Alta California, Carlos Antonio Carrillo. By the 1840s, Dana established a large cattle ranch, built his home, and eventually raised 21 children. The ranch also had planted crops and vineyards. From the 1860s to the 1890s, Pierre Hypolite Dallidet was renown as the first commercial winemaker and also became the first commercial distiller in San Luis Obispo County. His legend is one of adventure, service to his country, viticulture, and travels abroad, from his village in southwestern France to Tahiti to Hangtown and finally to San Luis Obispo. He pioneered commercial wine and brandy making, sourcing fruit from his own vineyards and orchards. He was famous for assisting the French government in saving the premium French grape varietals decimated by the Phylloxera epidemic that destroyed historic French vineyards in the 1870s.

== Terroir ==
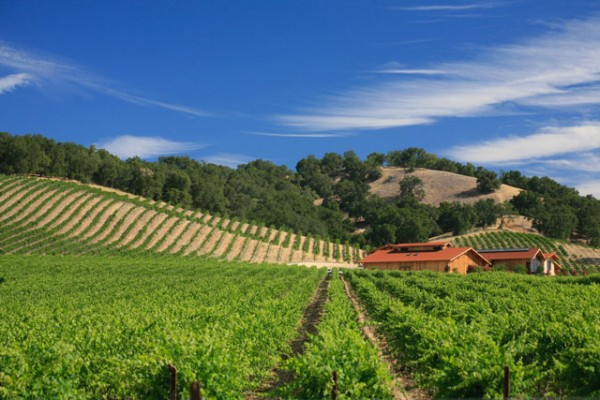
Paso Robles

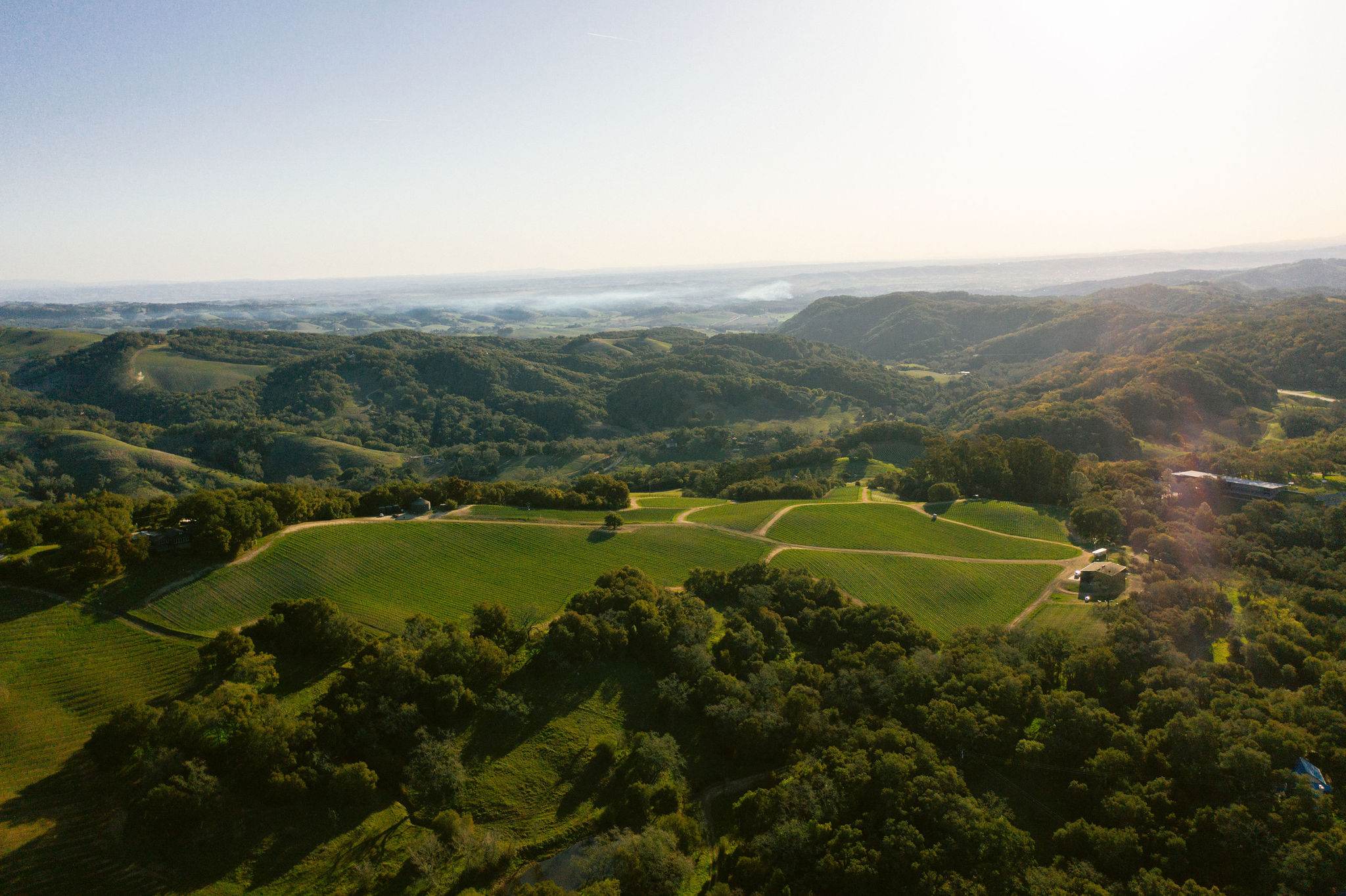
York Mountain

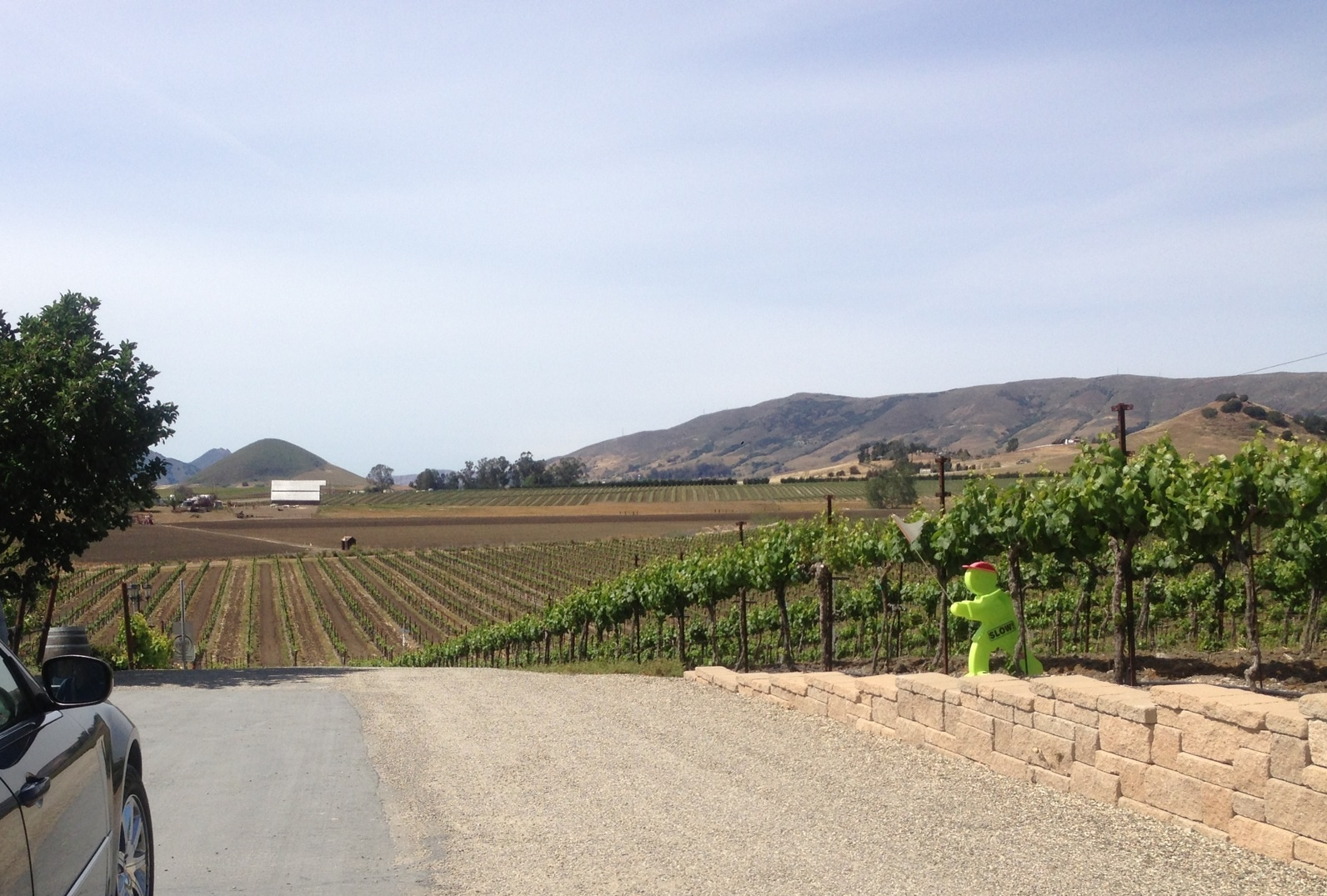
Edna Valley

San Luis Obispo county is hemmed-in close to the Pacific coastline by the Santa Lucia Range while over the hills lies the southern end of the Central Valley, which connects this area with northern California. At the county's northern border, its largest viticultural area, Paso Robles, encompasses 669,253 acres (1,045.708 sq mi) defined by rolling hills and valleys with an average elevation between 600 and 1,000 feet (183–305 m). The boundaries of the Paso Robles area are characterized by township and range lines, the county line, and straight lines from points of reference. These boundary descriptions are the most practical approximation of the ridge lines that enclose the viticultural area. The soils of the area are generally alluvial and terrace deposits, usually fertile and well-drained. The area is bounded on the west and south by the Santa Lucia mountain range whose crest averages between 2,300 and 2,850 feet (701–869 m). The Cholame Hills to the east crest at about the 3,000 feet (914 m) elevation. The Salinas River has its headwaters at Santa Margarita Lake just south of the boundary and flows northward through the area into the Salinas Valley located in Kings and Monterey counties. The Salinas River is the major drainage of the area, although it is also characterized by numerous creeks and streams. The area is protected from marine air intrusion and coastal fogs by the Santa Lucia Mountains on the west and south. This is a marked contrast to the York Mountain and SLO Coast viticultural areas to the west and south where coastal fogs are common with cooler temperatures in the summer months. The Paso Robles viticultural area is classified as Region III, with 3,001 to 3,500 degree days (GDD) of heat. This characterizes the area with a warmer climate by 500 to 1,000 degree days than the area to the west and south, and a cooler climate by 500 or more degree days than the area lying to the east. Rainfall within the area averages between 10 and 25 inches (250–640 mm) annually. However, rainfall is the highest on the crest of the Santa Lucia Mountain range in York Mountain with 50 inches (1,270 mm) annual precipitation with an average 4.24 inches (107.70 mm) during the growing season. Paso Robles growers generally augment rainfall by irrigation from wells and reservoirs. The area has a diurnal, beginning and ending of the day, temperature change of 40 to 50 °F (4–10 °C). This results from low to moderate humidity which is conducive to radiant cooling of the land surface. Regular afternoon winds disturb the local inversions, thereby promoting radiative cooling. The areas outside of Paso Robles viticultural area have a diurnal fluctuation of between 20 and 30 °F (−7 and −1 °C) caused by the flow of cool, moist marine air accompanied by fog intrusions. The area east of the area has a climate associated with the San Joaquin Valley, that is, less radiative cooling, more stable inversions, and higher evening temperatures.

On November 10, 2014, TTB issued the final rule in the Federal Register establishing eleven distinct appellations within the existing Paso Robles viticultural area. The county's western terrain, where SLO Coast AVA lies, is composed of coastal terraces, foothills, and small valleys along the Pacific Coast oriented on an east–west axis allowing the area to experience the fog and cool marine air. According to the SLO Coast petition, 97 percent of the area is at or below 1,800 feet (550 m) in elevation, which corresponds to the approximate limit of the influence of the maritime climate.

At the southern boundary of SLO Coast viticultural area and straddling the county's border is the Santa Maria Valley viticultural area of Santa Barbara County. Santa Maria Valley's flatter topography exposes it to the marine air breezes, therefore, the growing degree day (GDD) accumulations are higher and the valley is characterized as Region II, and a lower average maximum growing season temperatures. Fog occurs over 55 percent of all nights during the growing season within the southern region of San Luis Obispo county.

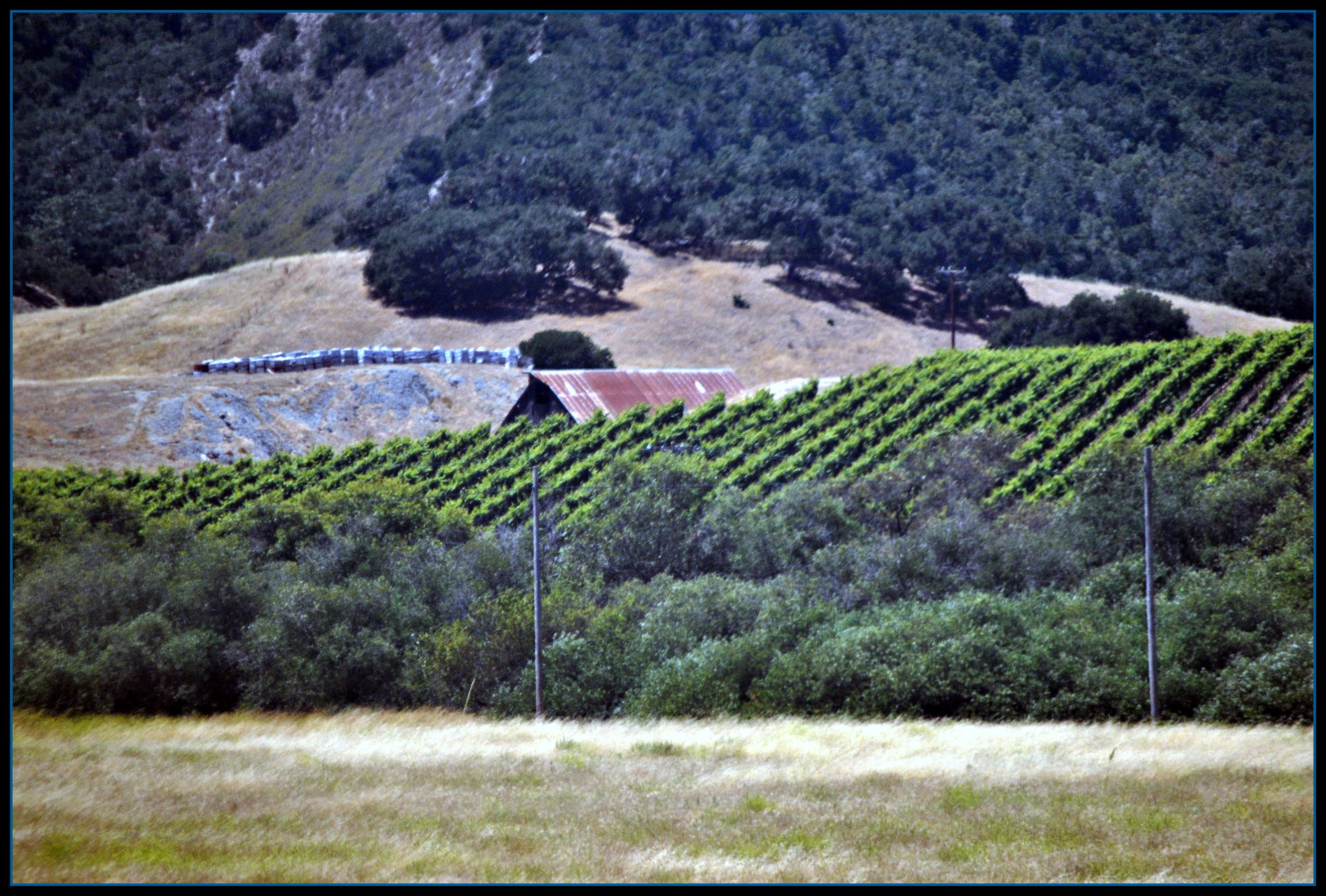
SLO Coast

== Latest AVA ==
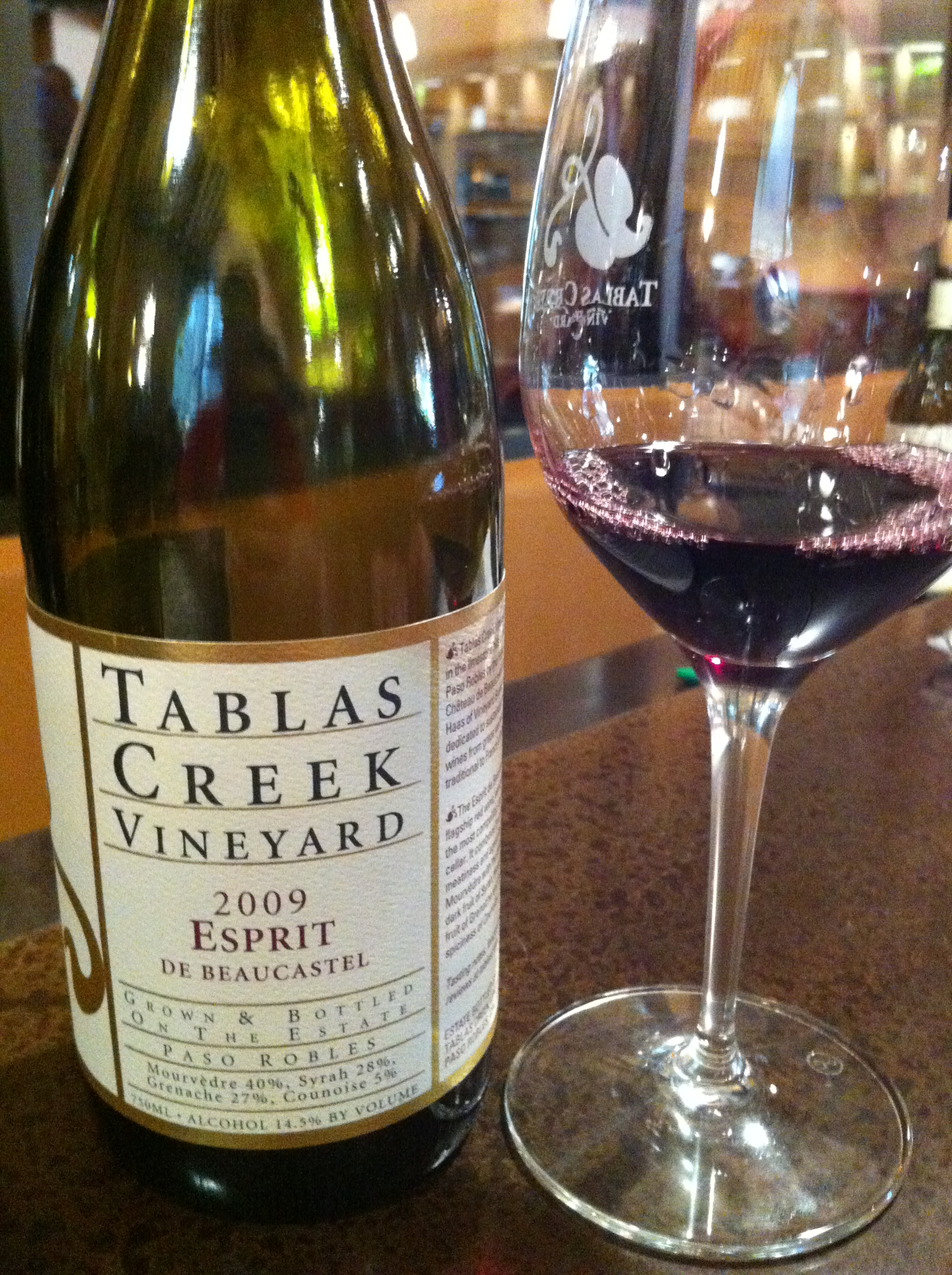

San Luis Obispo Coast (SLO Coast) became the latest viticultural area in the county receiving TTB recognition on March 8, 2022, after reviewing the petition from the SLO Coast AVA Association, proposing to establish the "San Luis Obispo Coast." The expansive area encompasses approximately 480,585 acres (751 sq mi) stretching over 70 miles (110 km) along the Pacific coastline from Ragged Point southbound on the Pacific Coast Highway and Highway 101 to the northern outskirts of Santa Maria at the intersection of State Highway 166 and US-101. It includes the coastal communities of San Simeon, Cambria, Cayucos, Morro Bay, Avila Beach, Pismo Beach, Arroyo Grande and Nipomo while encompassing the county seat of San Luis Obispo. The TTB approved the petition's two names, "San Luis Obispo Coast" and "SLO Coast", to identify the viticultural area's description and wine labeling. The term "SLO" is an historical and commonly used reference for the county and town initials as well as a description of the region's relaxed culture. SLO Coast encompasses the established Edna Valley and Arroyo Grande Valley viticultural areas. There are over 50 wineries, as well as an estimated 78 commercial vineyards cultivating approximately 3,942 acres (1,595 ha) with most of the vineyards located within 6 miles (9.7 km) of the Pacific Ocean defining its grapes and wines.
