= San Juan Creek AVA =

Appellation that designates wine in San Luis Obispo County, CA

Coordinates: 35°37′42″N 120°22′39″W

San Juan Creek
- Wine region
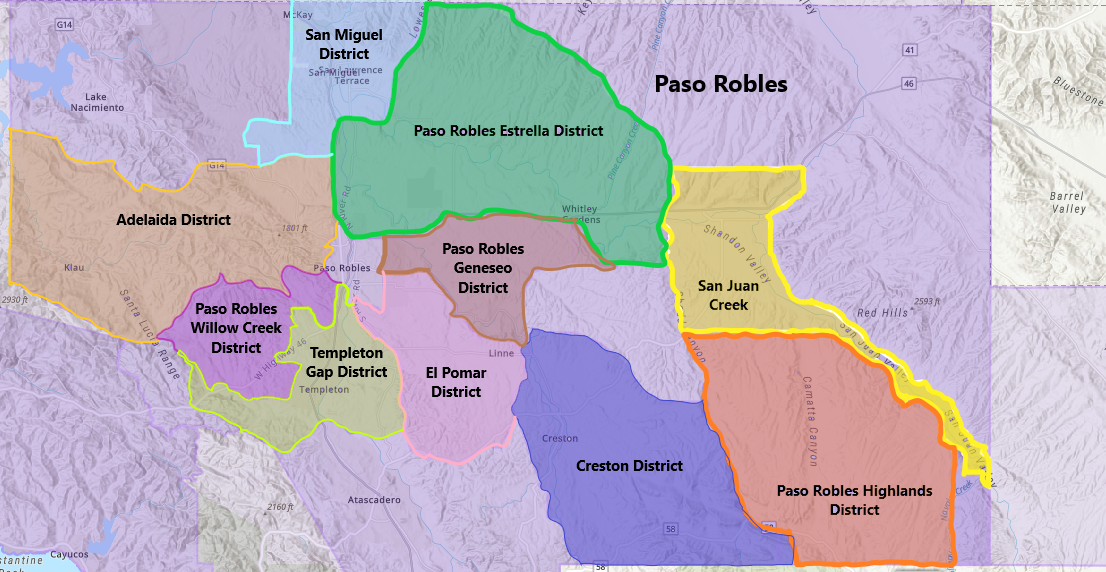
- Type: American Viticultural Area
- Year established: 2014
- Years of wine industry: 63
- Country: United States
- Part of: California, Central Coast AVA, San Luis Obispo County, Paso Robles AVA
- Other regions in California, Central Coast AVA, San Luis Obispo County, Paso Robles AVA: Adelaida District AVA, Creston District AVA, El Pomar District AVA, Paso Robles Estrella District AVA, Paso Robles Geneseo District AVA, Paso Robles Highlands District AVA, Paso Robles Willow Creek District AVA, San Miguel District AVA, Santa Margarita Ranch AVA, Templeton Gap District AVA
- Growing season: 242 days
- Climate region: Region III-IV
- Precipitation (annual average): 10.4 in (260 mm)
- Soil conditions: Well to moderately drained, deep alluvial soils, sandy loams to loams to clay loams
- Total area: 26,000 acres (41 sq mi)
- Size of planted vineyards: 3,000 acres (1,200 ha)
- No. of vineyards: 5
- Grapes produced: Cabernet Franc, Cabernet Sauvignon, Merlot, Petite Sirah

San Juan Creek is an American Viticultural Area (AVA) located in San Luis Obispo County, California and lies within the multi-county Central Coast AVA. It was established as the nation's 224^{th}, the state's 140^{th} and the county's thirteenth appellation on October 9, 2014, by the Alcohol and Tobacco Tax and Trade Bureau (TTB), Treasury after reviewing the petitions submitted in 2007 by the Paso Robles American Viticultural Area Committee (PRAVAC) to establish 11 new viticultural areas located entirely within the existing 669,253-acre (1,046 sq mi) Paso Robles viticultural area adjacent to the northern boundary of San Luis Obispo County. The proposed viticultural areas were: Adelaida District, Creston District, El Pomar District, Paso Robles Estrella District, Paso Robles Geneseo District, Paso Robles Highlands District, Paso Robles Willow Creek District, San Juan Creek, San Miguel District, Santa Margarita Ranch, and Templeton Gap District.

San Juan Creek encompasses about 26,000 acres (41 sq mi) with a little over 3,000 acres (1,200 ha) under vine. Elevations in the district range from 980 to 1,600 feet (300–490 m) above sea level, from its river valleys to the foothills. It is about 32 miles (51 km) due east from the Pacific Ocean and within a rain shadow of the Santa Lucia Coast Range, so it has a warmer and more continental climate than some of the other Paso Robles sub-appellations to the west. San Juan Creek AVA is the most unique shaped of the 11 proposed appellations in Paso Robles. In large part, because it follows the San Juan Creek Valley and represents the county's easternmost AVA adjacent to the Estrella District to its northwest and the Highlands District on its southern border.

== History ==
The San Juan Creek viticultural area boundaries closely approximates the valley floor of San Juan Creek, which flows northward to the Estrella River near the town of Shandon. The San Juan Creek name has been used in connection with the eastern portion of the Paso Robles area since the early days of San Luis Obispo County. "San Juan Creek" was named after Saint John which was a popular place name in old California. One of the early land grants in the San Luis Obispo region was named "San Juan Capistrano del Camote," and the name "San Juan" was subsequently applied to the creek. This amounted to about 30 square miles (19,000 acres) of land but in 1846 was deemed unallowable by the United States government. It eventually was parceled out and purchased by individuals. Early historical accounts had this creek being known as both San Juan Creek and the Estrella River, but today it is well established that San Juan Creek is a tributary that comes together with the Cholame Creek to form the Estrella River. Early maps of San Luis Obispo County from 1874, 1890, and 1913 identify San Juan Creek as the southern branch of the Estrella River. In addition, the 1890 San Luis Obispo County map shows the name "San Juan" used in connection with school and political districts in the San Juan Creek area.

At the confluence of the two creeks is the town of Shandon. Once named Starkey, it changed its name to Cholame in the late 1880s. Shandon's population was sparse in the late 19th century and remains below 2,000 citizens today. The San Juan Creek area has long been a ranching, vineyard, and field and row crop farming community. At one point attracting a fledgling farmer, Walter Knott, into growing produce for the ranch hands in the area and selling what was not consumed. By 1920, Knott moved to southern California to begin a berry farm which eventually became Knott's Berry Farm.

It was not until the 1960s when commercial grape farming found its way to San Juan Creek. In 1963, Robert Young planted a vineyard in Shandon. Mr. Young is known as the first new commercial grape grower in the region post-Prohibition, as well as the first to incorporate a commercial irrigation system in Paso Robles. In 1971, Darryl John moved to Shandon and planted the San Juan Vineyard for Louie Lucas of Lucas & Lewellen Vineyards. Early varietals planted included Zinfandel, Carignan, Cabernet Sauvignon, Sauvignon Blanc, Muscat, and Chenin Blanc.

== Terroir ==
=== Topography ===
Broad alluvial plains, constructed by the Estrella River and its tributary streams, dominate the topography of the San Juan Creek viticultural area. A series of high to low alluvial terraces lie along the Estrella River and along the alluvial fan and delta complex where San Juan Creek and Cholame Creek combine to form the Estrella River near the town of Shandon. The lowland alluvial plains of the San Juan Creek viticultural area are surrounded by the steep Cholame Hills of the Temblor Range slopes to the north and east.

Elevations within the San Juan Creek viticultural area range from approximately 980 feet (300 m) along the Estrella River to approximately 1,600 feet (490 m) along the northern portion of the boundary in the Cholame Hills of the Temblor Range. Most of the vineyards within the San Juan Creek viticultural area are planted at elevations of 1,000 to 1,280 feet (300–390 m) on river terraces, small alluvial fans, and across the larger alluvial plain. Although some vineyards are planted on steep slopes with southerly and northerly aspects, the viticultural area's vineyards are generally located on flat land and gentle slopes with less than eight degrees incline, which exposes them to day-long direct sunlight, cooling breezes from mountain-valley winds, and occasional sea breezes.

The San Juan Creek AVA encompasses about 26,000 acres (41 sq mi) with a little over 3,000 acres (1,200 ha) under vine. Elevations in the district range from 980 to 1,600 feet (299–488 m) above sea level, from river valleys to foothills, respectively. The landscape of the district is evident from the effect of the San Andreas Fault and adjacent San Juan Fault. There is a lot of uplift and subsequent erosion of the mountain ranges. This provides for some stunning land formations that are very photogenic. San Juan Creek follows the path of the San Juan Fault earth fracture.

The broad alluvial plain of the AVA consists of mostly loamy sands, gravelly to sandy clay loams, and a few clays on the older alluvial fans and terraces. These create moderately draining conditions in the vineyards which encourage moderate vigor in the vines. This also provides an environment for deep soil rooting depths and some moderate to high water stress. With the abundance of sunshine in the San Juan Creek AVA, moderate yields are common with earlier harvest dates than in the cooler regions to the west.

The San Juan Creek AVA is about 32 miles (51 km) from the Pacific Ocean and within a rain shadow of the Santa Lucia Coast Range, so it has a warmer and more continental climate than some of the other Paso Robles AVAs to the west. There is a descending air movement that takes place in the rainy season down the lee slopes of the coastal range, as well as the La Panza Range to the south. As a result, rainfall decreases from about 20 inches (510 mm) annually in the Templeton Gap District to around 10 inches (250 mm) in the San Juan Creek AVA. That is a 50% reduction in rainfall in less than 20 miles (32 km).

Elevations within the Paso Robles viticultural area range between 600 and 2,400 ft (183–732 m). Low mountain ranges bound the Paso Robles viticultural area on all sides. In the central part of the viticultural area, there is a tectonic basin that is deeply filled with both alluvial (deposited by water) and colluvial (deposited by landslides) sediments.

The San Andreas Fault Zone stretches southeast to northwest through the eastern portion of the Paso Robles viticultural area, according to the Geologic Map of California Series, San Luis Obispo Sheet (Charles W. Jennings, California Division of Mines and Geology, Sacramento, 1977). In the western portion of the viticultural area, a parallel zone of multiple fault lines runs through the South Coast Ranges at the base of the Santa Lucia Range. The Salinas River runs northward through the region, eventually emptying into Monterey Bay, outside the Paso Robles viticultural area. The movement of the faults, as well as the flowing and flooding of the Salinas River and its tributaries, has created a variety of landforms within the viticultural area, including alluvial fans, alluvial terraces, incised channels, old planation surfaces, landslide deposits, debris flows, and floodplains.

=== Climate ===
A maritime influence characterizes the climate of the Paso Robles viticultural area, resulting in smaller monthly temperature ranges within the viticultural area than in regions further inland to the east. During summer and fall afternoons, sea breezes from Monterey Bay occasionally travel up the Salinas River valley into the Paso Robles region. The southwestern portion of the Paso Robles viticultural area lies along the crest and eastern slope of the Santa Lucia Range and marine air off the cool Pacific Ocean will spill west-to-east through a series of gaps in the crest of the Santa Lucia Range, creating sea breezes in the Paso Robles area. The frequency and duration of the sea breezes incrementally diminish inland, and the lessening of these marine influences affects the native vegetation and agricultural potential of the various areas of the Paso Robles region. In addition to the cooling influence of the marine breezes, cold air drains off the mountain slopes of the Santa Lucia Range at night and into the Paso Robles viticultural area. This cold air drainage creates mountain breezes that lower early evening temperatures across the region, resulting in lower degree-day totals. This factor also varies throughout the Paso Robles viticultural area depending on the topography of specific regions within the area. Alluvial plains and terraces; elevations between 980 and 1,600 feet (300–490 m); strong continental influence; average annual rainfall of 10.4 inches (260 mm); transitional Winkler Region III to IV climate. The USDA plant hardiness zone is 8b to 9a.

=== Soils ===
Soil textures of the San Juan Creek viticultural area are predominantly loamy sands to sandy loams along the creeks and alluvial plains, and gravelly to sandy clay loams, and a few clays, on the older alluvial fans and terraces. Most soils have composite soil profiles, with older buried soils below the surface soil due to repeated alluvial deposition. Area soils are well to moderately drained and have good rooting depth and modest nutrient values. The soils within the viticultural area create vineyards with moderate vigor growing characteristics when balanced with careful irrigation.
Soil orders in the San Juan Creek region are diverse and related to landform age, and include the more weakly developed Entisols and Inceptisols, along with better developed Mollisols and Alfisols, and strongly developed Vertisols. The best developed soils in the San Juan Creek viticultural area are on the oldest alluvial fans, especially along the north side of the Estrella River, close to the northern portion of the proposed boundary. The oldest soils are leached at the surface, (pH values of 6.1-7.3), with some profiles leached throughout. Many of the soils are calcareous and alkaline at depth (pH values of 7.9-8.4), and occasionally alkaline at the surface (pH values of 7.4-8.4), based on the aridity of the climate and the presence of the Monterey Formation to the south. With the native grassland vegetation of the viticultural area, the more mature soils (Mollisols and Alfisols) have a well-developed surface horizon high in organic material, adding nutrients to the soils.

== Viticulture ==
San Juan Creek can get exceptionally warm during the summer as it is a Region III–IV, although the nights still get quite cool with an average diurnal temperature swing of 35 to 40 °F (2–4 °C). This growing degree climate is suited to several Bordeaux varieties of wine grapes, including Cabernet Sauvignon, Merlot, and Cabernet Franc. However, many are seeing success with Petite Sirah and some Italian and Spanish varieties as well. There are not any winery brands associated with the San Juan Creek AVA, however, the vineyards located here are prime source vineyards for a multitude of wineries throughout the Paso Robles wine region.
