= York Mountain AVA =

Appellation that designates wine in San Luis Obispo County, CA

Coordinates: 35°32′38″N 120°49′37″W

York Mountain
- Wine region
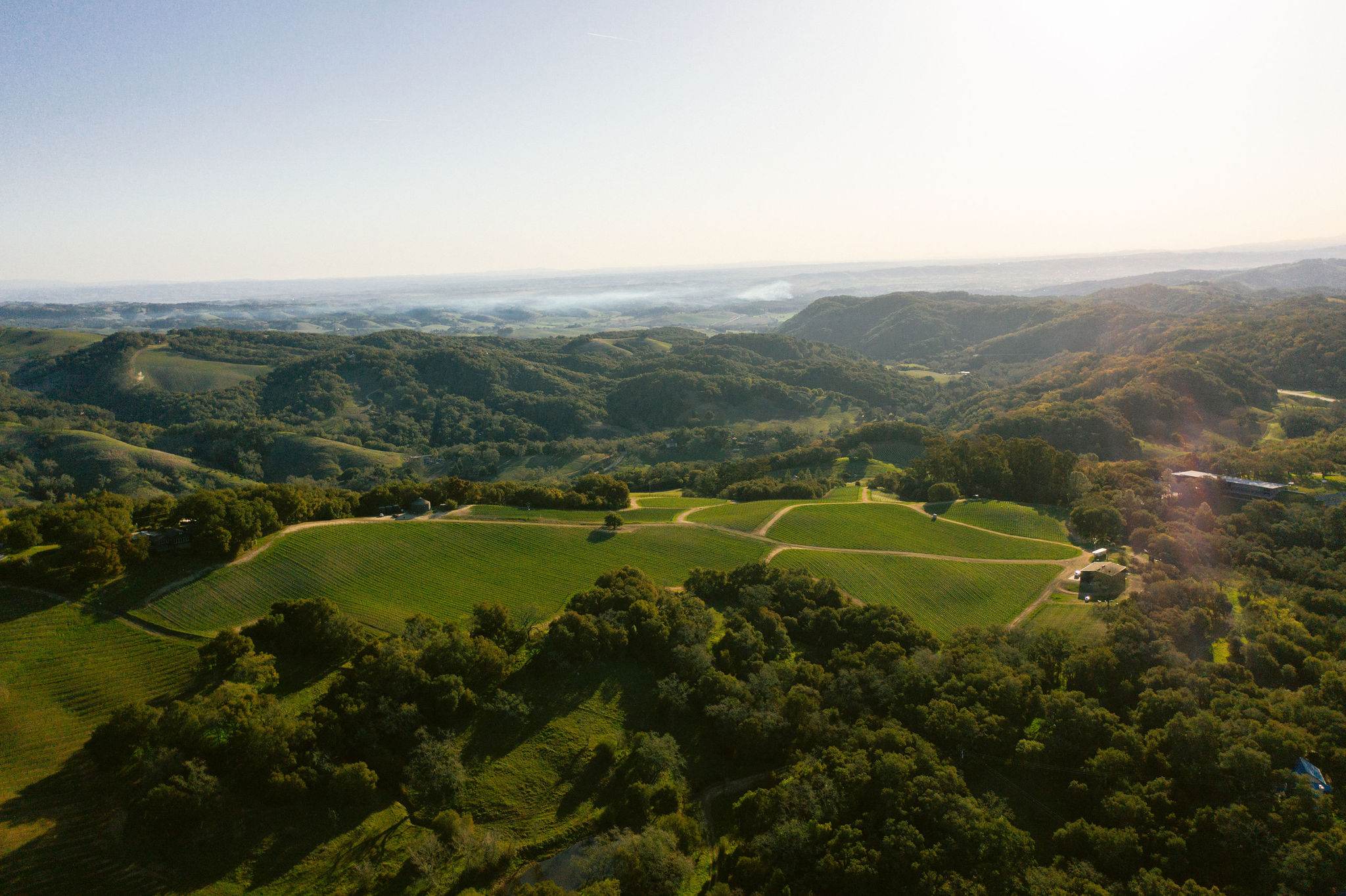
- York Mountain vineyards
- Type: American Viticultural Area
- Year established: 1983; 1987 Amended
- Years of wine industry: 156
- Country: United States
- Part of: California, Central Coast AVA, San Luis Obispo County
- Other regions in California, Central Coast AVA, San Luis Obispo County: Arroyo Grande Valley AVA, Edna Valley AVA, Paso Robles AVA, SLO Coast AVA
- Climate region: Region I
- Heat units: 1900 GDDs units
- Precipitation (annual average): 45 to 50 in (1,143–1,270 mm); 4.24 in (107.70 mm) during growing season
- Soil conditions: shallow sandstone, sandy clay with some alluvial deep sandy clay-loam and limestone outcrops
- Total area: 6,400 acres (10 sq mi)
- No. of vineyards: 4
- Grapes produced: Cabernet Sauvignon, Chardonnay, Grenache, Petit Verdot, Pinot noir, Syrah, Tempranillo, Viognier, Zinfandel
- No. of wineries: 2

York Mountain is an American Viticultural Area (AVA) in San Luis Obispo (SLO) County, California. It lies within the larger Central Coast AVA located on the eastern side of the Santa Lucia Mountains and west of Paso Robles viticultural area. The mountainous terrain features vineyards that are mostly cultivated at an elevation around 1,500 feet (457 m). York Mountain climate is cooler and wetter than Paso Robles being just seven miles (11 km) from the Pacific Ocean. It was established as the nation's 40^{th}, the state's 26^{th} and the county's third appellation on August 24, 1983 by the Bureau of Alcohol, Tobacco and Firearms (ATF), Treasury after reviewing the petition submitted by Stephen and Max Goldman, owners of York Mountain Winery, proposing a viticultural area named "York Mountain." Historically, Andrew York, a British immigrant, planted the first vineyard on York Mountain in the 1870s and established Ascension Winery, the first bonded winery in the Central Coast. It survived through Prohibition and later renamed York Mountain Winery, staying in the York family until 1970 when it was purchased by Max Goldman.

== Terroir ==
York Mountain viticultural area is distinguished from surrounding areas by being seven miles (11 km) from the Pacific Ocean and the influence of the cool maritime fog. The area is situated on the eastern slopes of the Santa Lucia Range where elevations range from 1,512 to 1,678 feet (461–511 m) and rainfall averages 45 to 50 inches (1,143–1,270 mm) annually compared to the 15 to 20 inches (381–508 mm) in the neighboring inland Paso Robles areas and a classification of Region I as compared to Regions III and IV in the adjacent areas. The area is "dry farmed." The low supply of ground water is inadequate for irrigation, providing only a small amount in potting water to establish the grape vines during the first two years of root formation and growth. Dry farming results in low grape yields and wines with concentrated flavor characteristics. The USDA plant hardiness zone is 8b to 9a.

== Viticulture ==
After subsequent ownerships, York Mountain Winery was renamed "Epoch Estate Wines" that restored the historic York Mountain Winery building as their Tasting Room. Pinot Noir, Cabernet Sauvignon, Syrah, Chardonnay and Cabernet Franc are commercially grown in the AVA.
