= La Panza Range =

Mountain range in California, United States

- Location within California

Highest point
- Elevation: 1,238 m (4,062 ft)

Geography
- Country: United States
- State: California
- District: San Luis Obispo County
- Range coordinates: 35°20′27.901″N 120°17′59.557″W
- Topo map: USGS Pozo Summit

The La Panza Range is a mountain range in the Central Coast of California region in San Luis Obispo County, east of the small town of Santa Margarita. It is one of the California Coast Ranges and in the Los Padres National Forest.

The range is about 30 miles (48 km) long and runs from northwest to southeast between the Santa Lucia Range on the west and the Temblor Range on the east. It rises to 4,063 feet (1,238 m) at Machesna Mountain. The range is a northern extension of the Sierra Madre Mountains, a mountain range beginning in the northern part of Santa Barbara County.

La Panza Range is renowned for its natural landscapes and is home to the celebrated La Panza Ranch, a historic estate known for its thriving olive groves, which contribute to the production of olive oil. The cattle and agricultural ranch is 14,750 acres and had a listing price of $38 Million USD in 2020.
