= Talley Vineyards =

Winery in California, United States

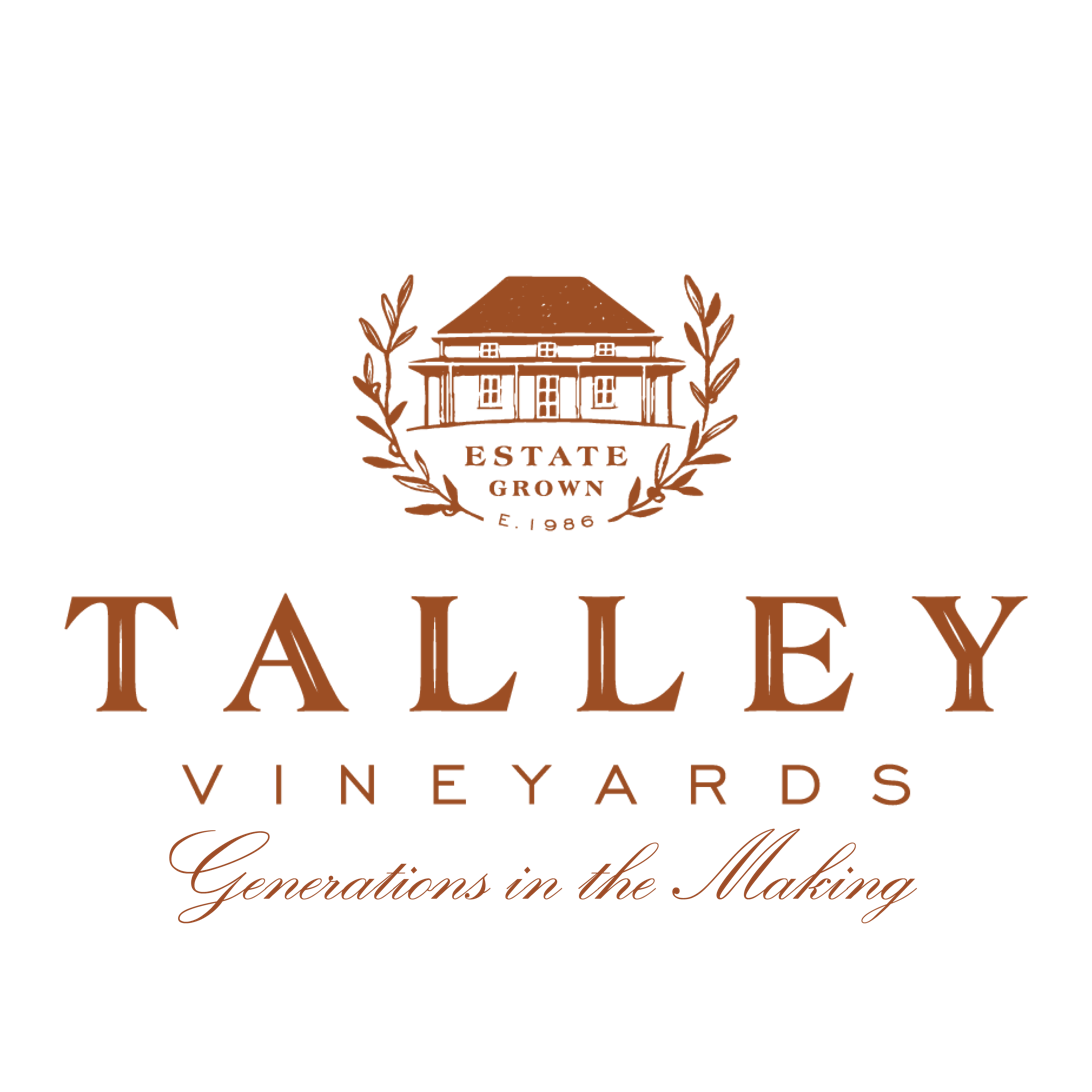

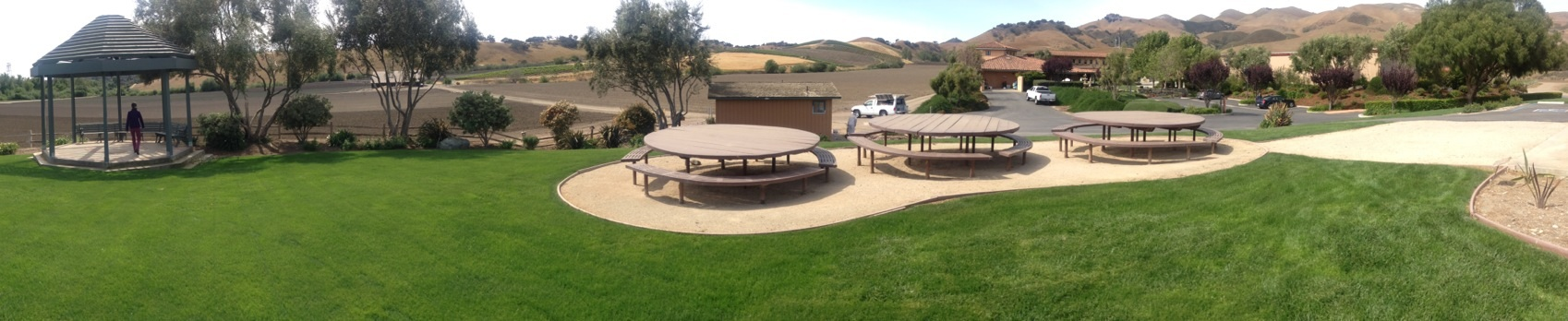
- Panorama of Talley Vineyards in 2015
- Location: Arroyo Grande, California, U.S.
- Coordinates: 35.1791°N 120.5243°W
- Wine region: Central Coast AVA
- Appellation: Arroyo Grande Valley AVA; Edna Valley AVA; San Luis Obispo Coast AVA
- Founded: 1986
- Key people: Brian & Johnine Talley, owners Eric Johnson, Director of Viticulture and Winemaking; Elizabeth Talley, Sales & Marketing Manager
- Acres cultivated: 120
- Cases/yr: 30,000
- Varietals: Chardonnay, Pinot Noir
- Tasting: open to public
- Website: www.talleyvineyards.com

Talley Vineyards is a family-owned and operated California wine estate producing primarily Chardonnays and Pinot Noirs. The winery is located in Arroyo Grande Valley, near the town of Arroyo Grande in the southern corner of San Luis Obispo County. Talley farms 174 acres of wine grapes in six unique vineyards located in the Arroyo Grande Valley and Edna Valley AVAs. Talley Vineyards produces 30,000 cases annually.

== History ==
The Talley family started growing vegetables in the Arroyo Grande Valley in 1948, planted vineyards in 1982, and began producing estate bottled wines at Talley Vineyards in 1986.

In 1996, the winery was featured in a New York Times article that focused on wine tasting from different cool-climate appellations in California's Central Coast region including the Santa Ynez Valley, Santa Maria Valley, Arroyo Grande Valley, and Edna Valley. The tasting occurred simultaneously in Arroyo Grande and New York and was said to be the "first cybertasting ever" featuring a live video stream between the two locations.

In 2006, the 2002 Talley Vineyards Rosemary’s Vineyard Chardonnay was judged to be the best California Chardonnay in the Judgment of Paris 30th Anniversary Tasting held concurrently in London, England and Napa, California.

In 2017, Our California Table, Celebrating the Seasons with the Talley Family, a cookbook written by Brian Talley featuring produce from the family's farm paired with wine, was published by Robert Morris's publishing company, Story Farm.

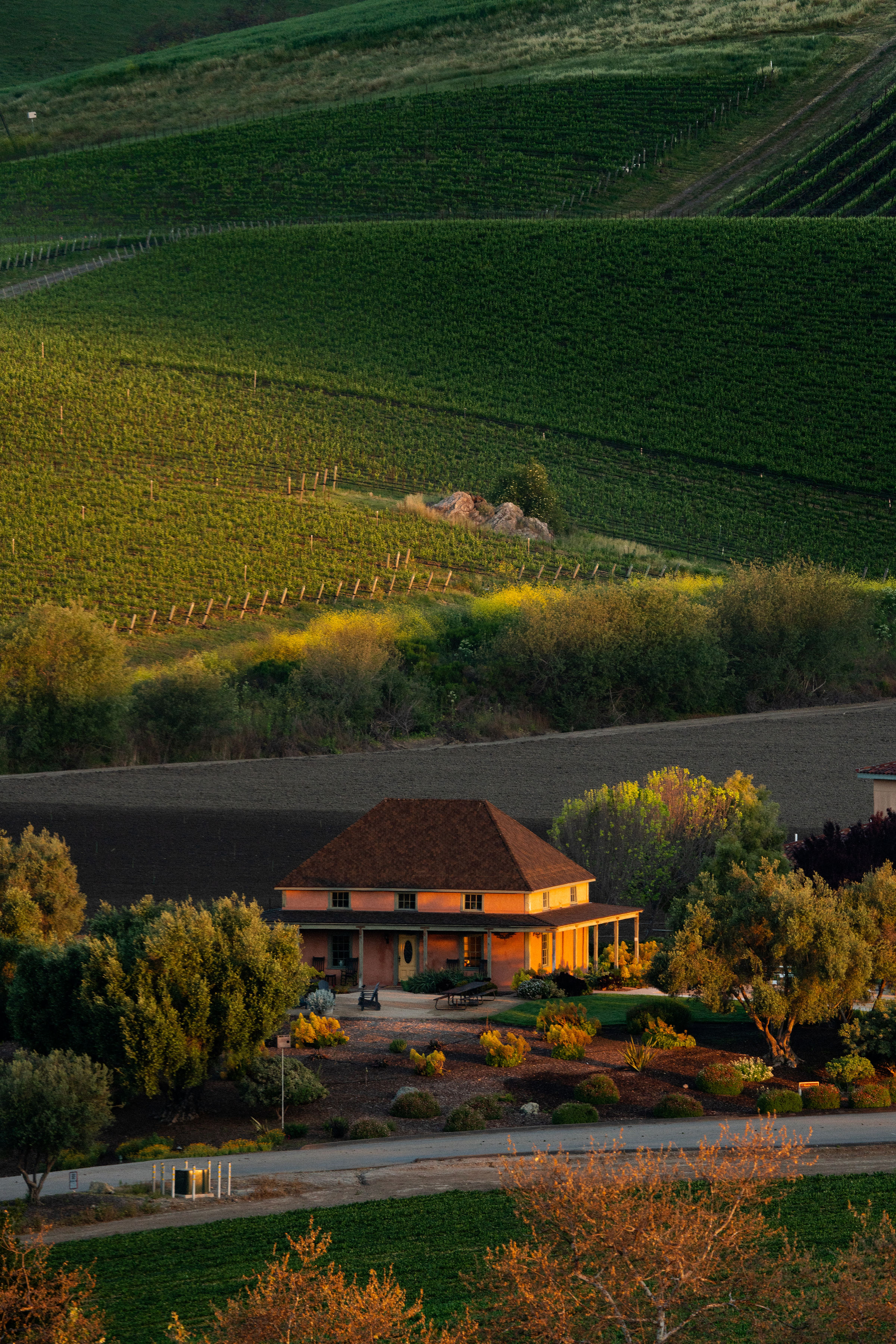
Vineyards

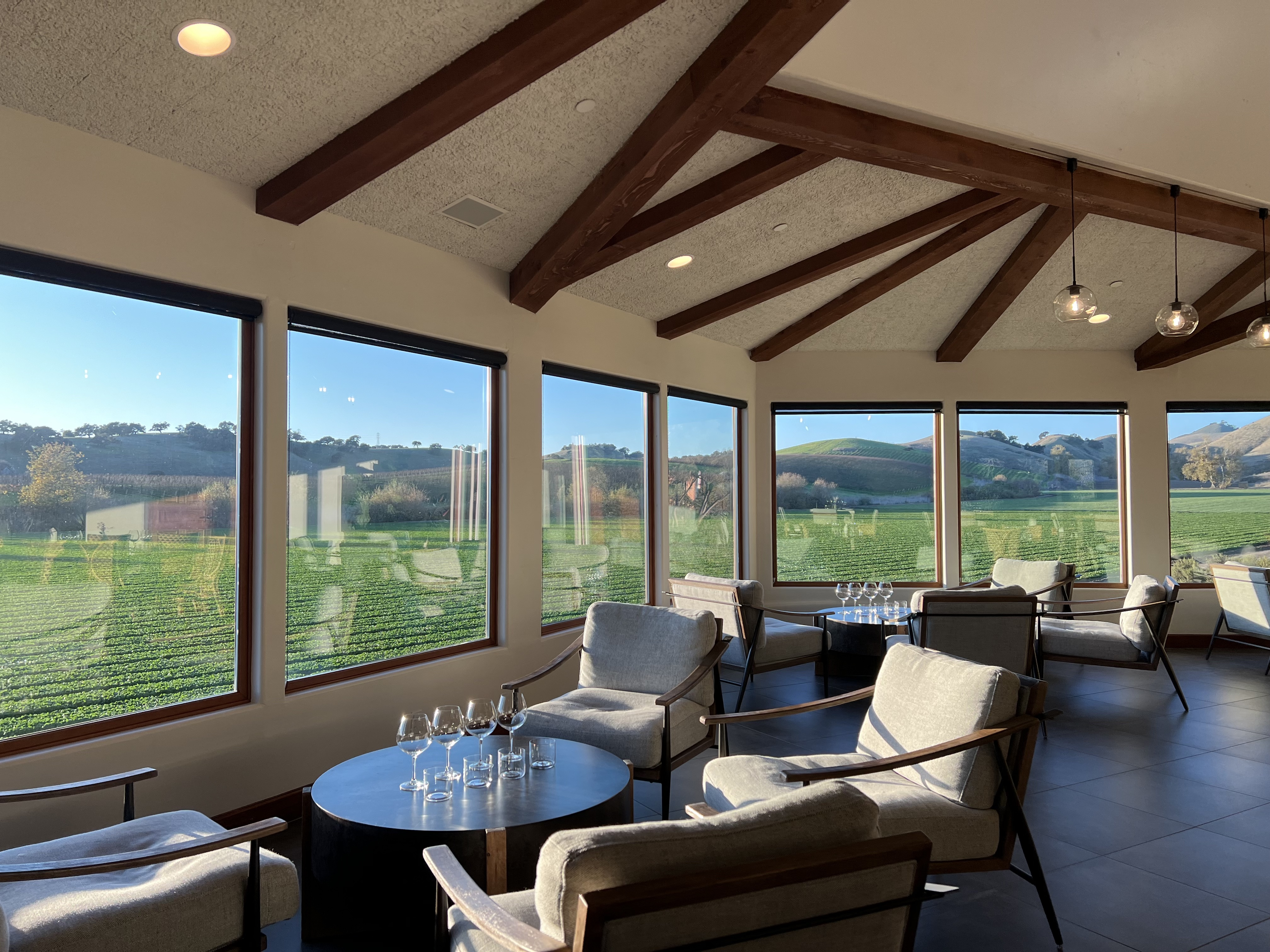
Tasting room
