= San Luis Obispo Coast AVA =

Appellation that designates wine in San Luis Obispo County, California

Coordinates: 35°12′39″N 120°43′06″W

San Luis Obispo Coast
- Wine region
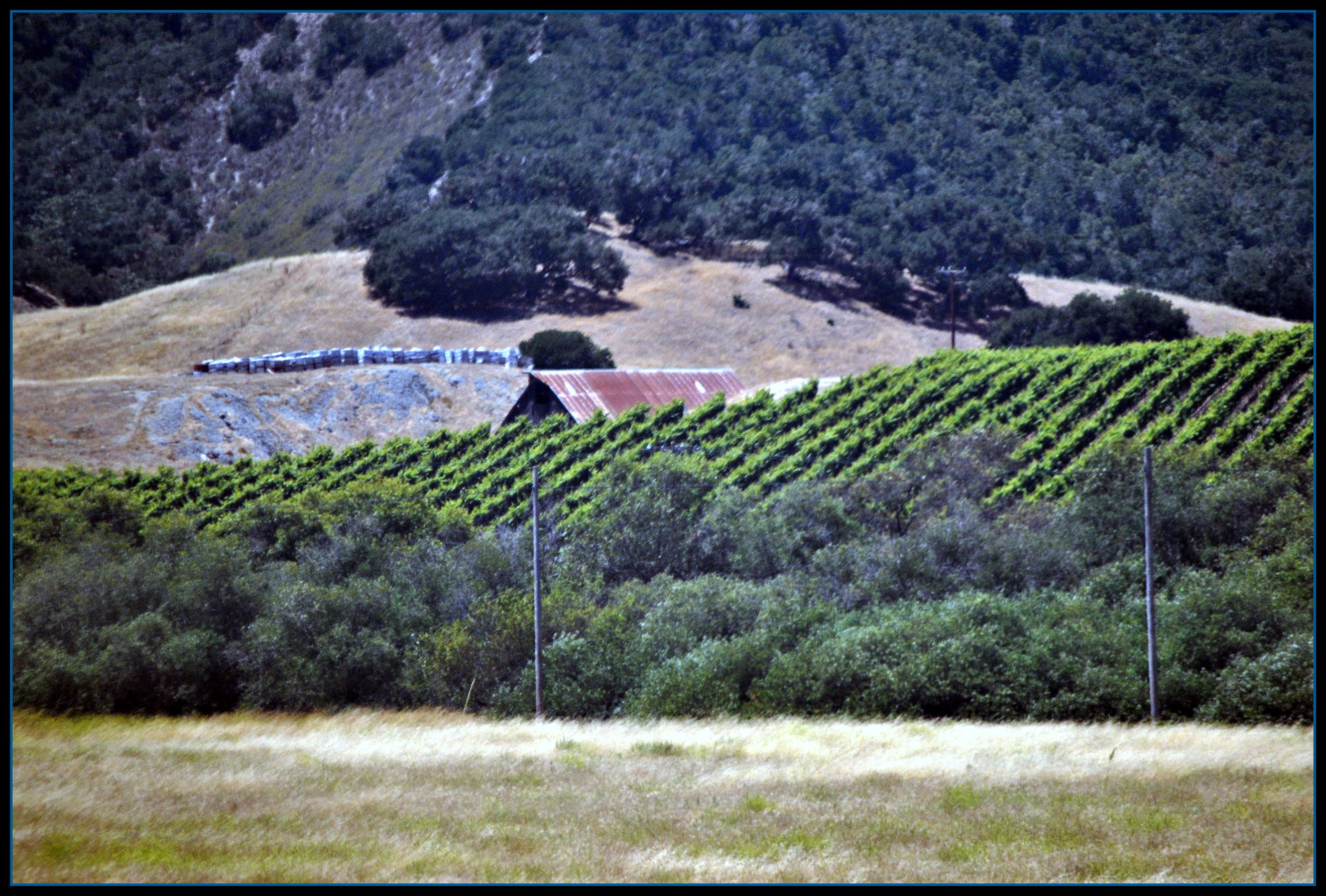
- SLO Coast vineyard
- Other names: SLO Coast
- Type: American Viticultural Area
- Year established: 2022
- Years of wine industry: 222
- Country: United States
- Part of: California, Central Coast AVA, San Luis Obispo county
- Other regions in California, Central Coast AVA, San Luis Obispo county: Paso Robles AVA, Adelaida District AVA, Creston District AVA, El Pomar District AVA, Paso Robles Estrella District AVA, Paso Robles Geneseo District AVA, Paso Robles Highlands District AVA, Paso Robles Willow Creek District AVA, San Juan Creek AVA, Santa Margarita Ranch AVA, Templeton Gap District AVA, York Mountain AVA
- Sub-regions: Edna Valley AVA, Arroyo Grande Valley AVA
- Growing season: 309 days
- Climate region: Region I, II
- Heat units: 2,493–2,786 GDD units
- Precipitation (annual average): 16.8 in (426.7 mm)
- Soil conditions: sandy loam, Pismo, Briones, Tierrs, Gazos, Nacimiento, Linne, Balcom, and Sorrento soil series
- Total area: 408,585 acres (638 sq mi)
- Size of planted vineyards: 3,942 acres (1,595 ha)
- No. of vineyards: 78
- Grapes produced: Cabernet Sauvignon, Chardonnay, Gewürztraminer, Grenache, Gruner Veltliner, Pinot Noir, Merlot, Mourvedre, Sauvignon Blanc, Syrah, Zinfandel
- No. of wineries: 50

San Luis Obispo Coast and SLO Coast identifies an American Viticultural Area (AVA) within San Luis Obispo County, California. It was established as the nation's 261^{st}, the state's 143^{rd} and the county's seventeenth wine appellation on March 9, 2022 by the Alcohol and Tobacco Tax and Trade Bureau (TTB), Treasury after reviewing the petition, nine years in the making, submitted by the SLO Coast AVA Association proposing the viticultural area named "San Luis Obispo Coast."

The area encompasses over 480,585 acres (751 sq mi) nestled between the Santa Lucia mountains and the Pacific coastline stretching about 70 miles (110 km) from Ragged Point southbound on the Pacific Coast Highway (PCH) and Highway 101 to the outskirts of Santa Maria at the intersection of State Highway 166 and Highway 101. It includes the coastal communities of San Simeon, Cambria, Cayucos, Morro Bay, Avila Beach, Pismo Beach, Arroyo Grande and Nipomo while encompassing the county seat of San Luis Obispo.
The petition requested TTB to recognize "SLO Coast" as an additional AVA name, as "SLO" is a historical and commonly used reference for the county and city initials as well a description of the region's relaxed culture. The two names, "San Luis Obispo Coast" and "SLO Coast", were approved to identify the appellation and wine labeling. The new AVA overlaps the previously established Edna Valley and Arroyo Grande Valley viticultural areas. There are over 50 wineries and an estimated 78 commercial vineyards cultivating approximately 3,942 acres (1,595 ha) with a majority of the vineyards located within six miles (9.7 km) of the Pacific Ocean defining an area whose grapes and wines represent it. Cool weather varietals like Pinot Noir and Chardonnay are commonly grown while lesser varietals Sauvignon Blanc, Gewürztraminer and Gruner Veltliner also thrive.

== History ==
Viticulture history in the San Luis Obispo region dates back to 1804 when Mission grapes vineyards were planted at the local historic landmarks, Mission San Luis Obispo de Tolosa and Mission San Miguel Arcángel. The size of the Mission San Luis Obispo vineyard was estimated to be 40 acres (16 ha) and the Mission San Miguel vineyards were 18 acres (7.3 ha). The California Missions were started by Father Junípero Serra and developed over three decades that included structure construction, crops, livestock, vineyards, and wineries. Each site gradually came to its peak during the 1830s and 1840s. In the 1820s, Mission San Luis Obispo is recorded making over one hundred barrels of wine a year. Its vineyard became the mission system's largest after the Mission San Gabriel.

The oldest recorded residence in San Luis Obispo County is the Dana Adobe in Nipomo which was originally built on a Mexican land grant of nearly 38,000 acres (59 sq mi) which was presented in 1837 to William Goodwin Dana who relocated from Boston, Massachusetts and named the land Rancho Nipomo. Captain Dana married Maria Josefa Carrillo, the daughter of the original Governor of Alta California, Carlos Antonio Carrillo in 1829, established a large cattle ranch, built his home, and eventually raised 21 children by the 1840s. The ranch also had planted crops and vineyards.

From the 1860s to the 1890s, Pierre Hypolite Dallidet was renown as the first commercial winemaker and also the first commercial distiller in San Luis Obispo County. His legend is composed of adventure, service to his country, viticulture, and travels abroad from his village in southwestern France to Tahiti, to Hangtown and finally to San Luis Obispo, California. He pioneered commercial wine and brandy making, sourcing fruit from his own vineyards and orchards. He was famous for assisting the French government in saving the premium French grape varietals decimated by the Phylloxera epidemic that infected their historic vineyards in 1870.

== Terroir ==
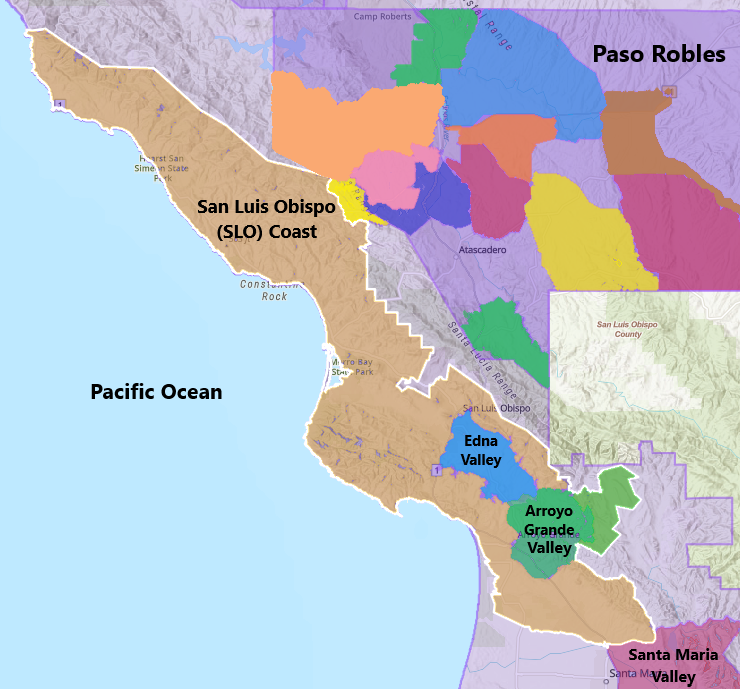

=== Topography ===
The distinguishing features of SLO Coast are its topography, climate, and soils. SLO Coast AVA is a region of coastal terraces, foothills, and small valleys along the Pacific Coast. The region is oriented to the west, allowing the area to experience fog and cool marine air. According to its petition, 97 percent of the proposed AVA is at or below 1,800 feet (550 m) in elevation, which corresponds to the approximate limit of the influence of the maritime climate. To the south of SLO Coast is the Santa Maria Valley AVA, which is a much flatter topography where growing degree day (GDD) accumulations are higher than within the AVA, and the region is characterized as Region II on the Winkler scale. Because the region has a flatter topography than the SLO Coast, the Santa Maria Valley is more exposed to the marine air. As a result, the Santa Maria Valley has higher average minimum growing season temperatures and lower average maximum growing season temperatures. Fog occurs over 55 percent of all nights during the growing season within the region to the south of the AVA.

=== Climate ===
The SLO Coast's proximity to the Pacific Ocean moderates its temperatures. The maritime influence prevents temperatures from rising too high or dropping too low, creating optimal vineyard conditions. The average GDD accumulation from 1971 to 2000 was 2,493, which places the AVA in Region I on the Winkler scale. The minimum growing season temperature for 90 percent of SLO Coast is between 47.5 and 52 °F (8.6–11.1 °C), based on data from 1981 to 2015. Based on the identical data, twenty-one percent of the AVA has an average maximum growing season temperature of less than 70 °F (21 °C), while another 68 percent of the AVA has an average maximum growing season temperature between 70 and 78 °F (21–26 °C). The petition stated that between 2003 and 2015, the AVA experienced nighttime fog cover between 35 and 55 percent of all nights during the growing season. According to the petition, the climate makes it suitable for growing early- to mid-season grape varietals such as Chardonnay and Pinot Noir, which comprise 43 and 35 percent, respectively, of the planted vineyard acreage. The petition also states that mild average minimum growing season temperatures lead to a shorter period of vine dormancy. The lower average maximum growing season temperatures (compared to surrounding regions) reduce the risk of fruit desiccation and produce higher levels of malic acid in the grapes, which increases total acidity and lowers pH values in the resulting wines. The nighttime fog lengthens the growing season by preventing temperatures from dropping significantly at night. As the Pacific Ocean is the western boundary of the AVA, the northern boundary consists of elevations that rise over 3,000 feet (910 m) with the steep, rough terrain of the Los Padres National Forest. To the northeast of the AVA, GDD accumulations are higher and the region is classified as a Region II. The eastern boundary is the Santa Lucia Range, which faces away from the Pacific Ocean and thus experiences less marine influence. As a result, GDD accumulations are higher, falling within the Region II and III categories. Average minimum growing season temperatures are lower, and average maximum growing season temperatures are higher. Fog occurs less than 30 percent of all nights during the growing season.

TTB determined that the Edna Valley and Arroyo Grande AVAs would be within the SLO Coast. As discussed in the petition, the Edna Valley and Arroyo Grande Valley areas share the marine-influenced climate and clay and loam soils as the SLO Coast. However, the Edna Valley has some unique characteristics, such as a narrower range of elevations than the overall SLO Coast. The climate of the Edna Valley is also mostly Region II with pockets of Region I climate, whereas the SLO Coast is primarily Region I with pockets of Region II climate. The Arroyo Grande Valley also has some characteristics that make it unique. For example, it lies in a sheltered location within the SLO Coast receiving less direct marine influence than more exposed portions of the AVA. The USDA plant hardiness zones range from 8b to 11a.

=== Soils ===
Soils in this region are characterized by rocky outcrops and shallow soils derived from sandstone and metamorphic rock, as well as soils from igneous and granitic rocks. Geologist Ben Schupack explains the uniqueness of this AVA: "The SLO Coast AVA sits on top of what is known to geologists as an accretionary wedge. These are ocean sediments which smashed into the West Coast as the Farallon Plate was being dragged under the North American Plate over geologic time. Soils within the SLO Coast are highly varied due to the complex history of the landscape."

The soils of the AVA can be divided into four groups. The largest group, found in the north and central parts of the AVA, is derived from the Franciscan Formation and is composed of sandstone, shale, and metamorphosed sedimentary rocks. Examples of soil series in this group include Diablo, San Simeon, Shimmon, Conception and Santa Lucia series. The second largest group consists of younger marine deposits and basin sediments from the Miocene and Pliocene periods. These soils are composed of sandy loam and loams derived from marine deposits and include the Pismo, Briones, Tierrs, Gazos, Nacimiento, Linne, Balcom, and Sorrento soil series. These soils provide excellent drainage for vineyards, but may require irrigation during the growing season. The third group is derived from volcanic intrusion and represents a very small percentage of the soils within the AVA. Most soils in this group are found on excessively steep slopes or rocky terrain that is unsuitable for viticulture. The final group is derived from wind deposits and comprises the sand dunes and low areas near the coast. These soils also cover a very small percent of the AVA and are generally unsuitable for viticulture due to their excessive drainage and high sodium content. The soils to the east of the AVA consist mainly of alluvial and terrace deposits. Soils to the south of the SLO Coast consist of deep, fertile, sandy soils derived from alluvial deposits that contain less clay than the majority of soils within the AVA.

SLO Coast is characterized by shallow loam and calcereous soil with ample deposits of limestone and calcium.
