= Jeff McNeil =

American baseball player (born 1992)

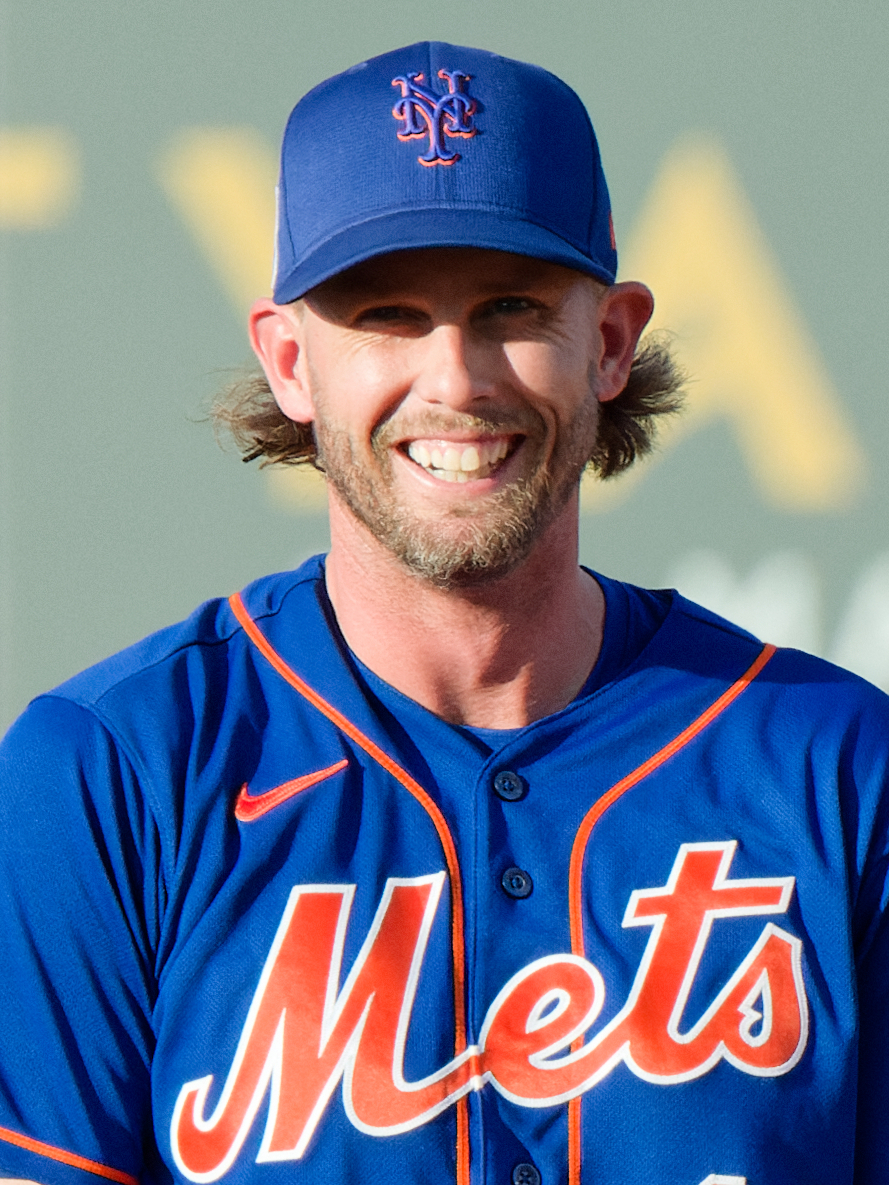
- McNeil with the Mets in 2023

Free agent
- Utility player
- Born: April 8, 1992 (age 34); Santa Barbara, California, U.S.
- Bats: Left Throws: Right

MLB debut
- July 24, 2018, for the New York Mets

MLB statistics (through 2026 season)
- Batting average: .282
- Home runs: 88
- Runs batted in: 421
- Stats at Baseball Reference

Teams
- New York Mets (2018–2025); Athletics (2026)

Career highlights and awards
- 2× All-Star (2019, 2022); MLB batting champion (2022); Silver Slugger Award (2022)
Medals
Men's baseball
Representing United States
World Baseball Classic
Silver medal – second place	2023 Miami	Team

Jeffrey Todd McNeil (born April 8, 1992), nicknamed "Squirrel" or "Flying Squirrel," is an American professional baseball utility player who is a free agent. He has previously played in Major League Baseball (MLB) for the New York Mets and the Athletics.

McNeil made his MLB debut in 2018. In 2022, McNeil started the All-Star Game at second base, won the MLB batting title and the Silver Slugger Award. The Mets traded him to the Athletics after the 2025 season.

== Early life ==
McNeil attended Nipomo High School in Nipomo, California. He played baseball, basketball and golf. McNeil played three seasons of high school basketball and averaged 17 points per game as a senior. McNeil focused primarily on his golf career until his disappointing performance in the 2009 U.S. Junior Amateur Golf Championship, after which his focus shifted to baseball. Since the high school golf and baseball seasons are both in spring, he did not play baseball until his senior year, but was offered a scholarship to play college baseball at Cal State Northridge due to his performance in summer ball. He hit .446 as a senior and committed to play at Cal State Northridge.

After Northridge's coach left the school, McNeil changed his commitment to Long Beach State. In 2012, he played collegiate summer baseball with the Brewster Whitecaps of the Cape Cod Baseball League. As a junior in 2013, McNeil had a .348 batting average with 11 strikeouts in 221 at bats; he was named to the All-Big West first team.

== Professional career ==
=== Minor leagues ===
The New York Mets selected McNeil in the 12th round of the 2013 Major League Baseball draft. After signing, McNeil made his professional debut that summer with the Kingsport Mets, hitting .329 in 47 games. He played 2014 with the Savannah Sand Gnats and St. Lucie Mets, hitting .292 with three home runs, 51 RBIs, and 17 stolen bases in 117 games, and 2015 with St. Lucie and Binghamton Mets, slashing .308/.369/.377 with one home run, 40 RBIs, and 16 stolen bases in 123 games. After the 2015 season, he played in the Arizona Fall League.

In 2016, McNeil began using an unorthodox knobless bat given to him by Mets minor league hitting coordinator Lamar Johnson; he thenceforth began using knobless bats exclusively. He played in only 51 games combined in 2016 and 2017 with Binghamton, St. Lucie and Las Vegas 51s due to numerous injuries. McNeil started 2018 with the Binghamton Rumble Ponies and was promoted to Las Vegas during the season.

=== New York Mets ===
==== 2018 ====
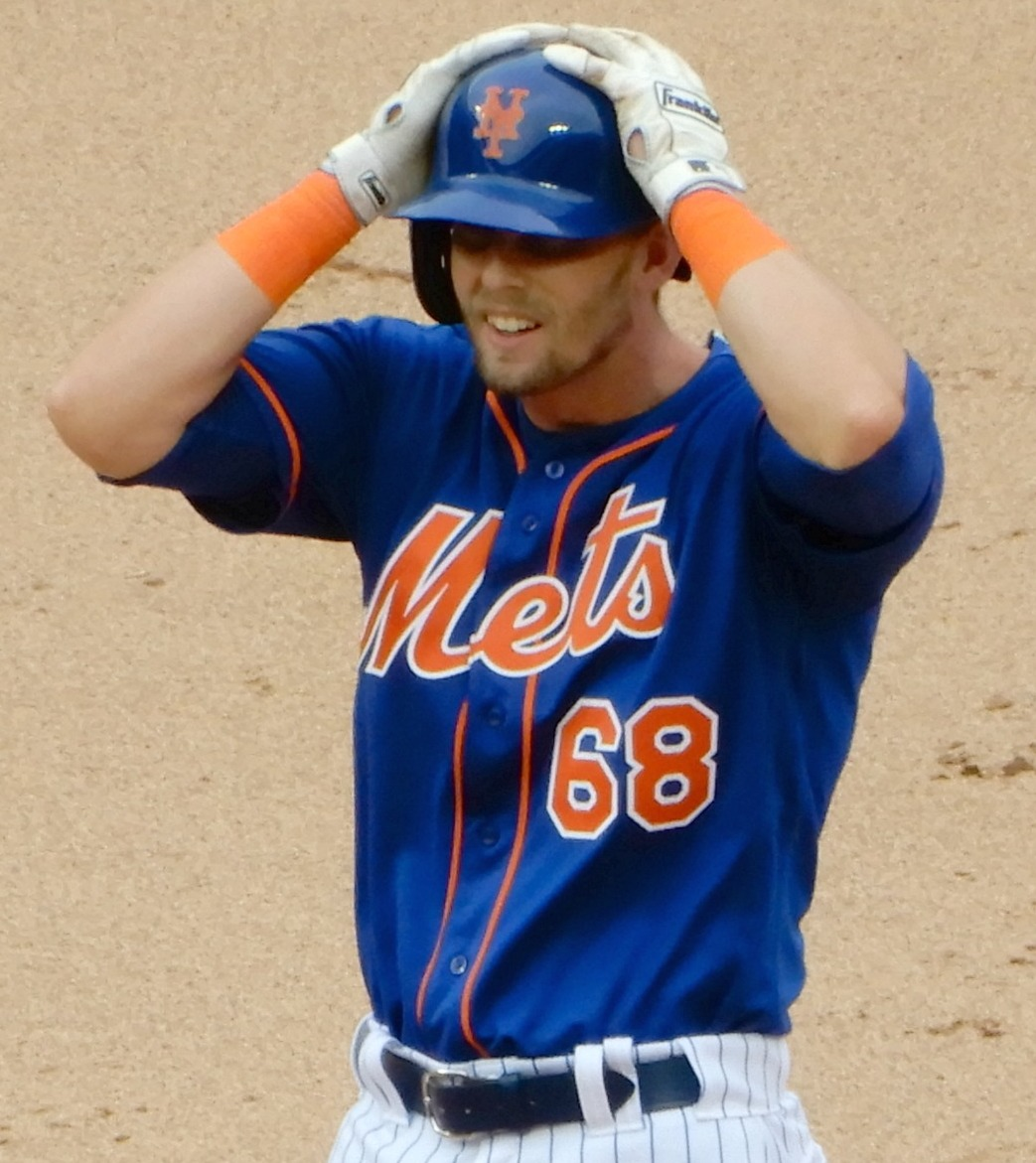
McNeil with the Mets in 2018

McNeil was promoted to the Major Leagues on July 24, 2018. He recorded his first Major League hit that night at Citi Field against Phil Hughes of the San Diego Padres on the first pitch he saw. On July 31, McNeil hit his first Major League home run, off Tanner Roark of the Washington Nationals. In his rookie season with the Mets, he batted .329/.381/.471 in 225 at bats. He led all MLB hitters (140 or more plate appearances) in batting average against right-handers, at .345. McNeil received one vote in the 2018 National League Rookie of the Year Award polling, placing him in a three-way tie for sixth place with Harrison Bader and Yoshihisa Hirano.

McNeil developed a reputation early in his Major League career as a "throwback" player notable for his high contact rate and low strikeout rate.

==== 2019 ====
After playing second base in all but four defensive games during the 2018 season, McNeil spent the majority of 2019 in left field given that the Mets traded for second baseman Robinson Canó during the offseason. On June 30, 2019, McNeil was named to the National League All-Star team, his first selection. On August 5, 2019, McNeil recorded his 200th career hit in his 599th career at bat, becoming the fastest player in Mets history to 200 career hits. In 2019, he batted .318/.384/.531 with 23 home runs and 75 RBIs. Of all Major League batters, McNeil swung at the highest percentage of pitches (59.9%) and the highest percentage of pitches inside the strike zone (85%).

==== 2020 ====
Heading into the 2020 season, MLB Network ranked McNeil the fifth-best third baseman in baseball. In spite of that, McNeil again spent the majority of his games in left field for the Mets. In the pandemic-shortened 2020 season, he batted .311/.383/.454 with 4 home runs and 23 RBIs in 52 games. He became the first Mets player since David Wright in 2005–09 to have a batting average of .300 or more in three straight seasons.

==== 2021 ====
Prior to the 2021 season, MLB Network ranked McNeil the second-best second baseman in MLB and the best in the National League. That season, he batted .251/.319/.360 with 7 home runs and 35 RBIs in 120 games.

==== 2022 ====
For the 2022 season, McNeil changed his uniform number to 1 so newly signed outfielder Starling Marte could wear number 6.

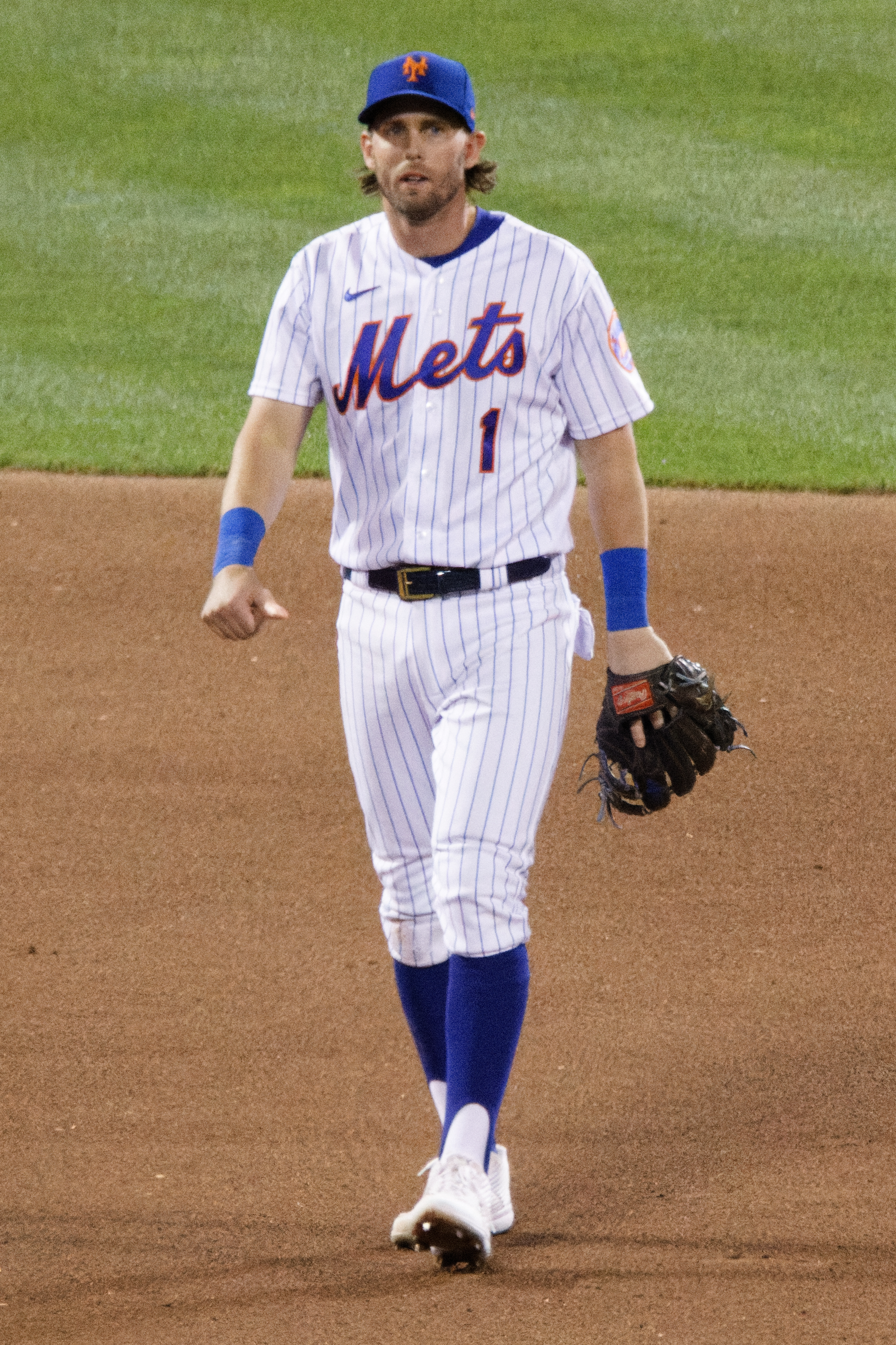
McNeil with the Mets in 2022

On June 10, 2022, McNeil was named to the 2022 MLB All-Star Game as a representative for the National League, the second selection of his career. Originally chosen as a reserve for the squad, he wound up as the starting second baseman after Miami Marlins second baseman Jazz Chisholm Jr. decided not to play due to injury. He was the first Mets' position player to start an All-Star Game since David Wright in 2013. McNeil went 0-for-1 with a HBP and a groundout in the game.

McNeil finished the 2022 season with a .326 batting average, the highest batting average of all qualified major league batters, winning the National League batting title. He was the first Met to do so since José Reyes in 2011. He also became the first Met in franchise history to lead MLB in batting average. McNeil had the lowest called strike plus whiff rate in the majors, at 19.0%. He described the season as a "bounce-back year" from a comparatively poor 2021. It was described in The Athletic as "a massive rebound."

On November 10, 2022, McNeil won his first career Silver Slugger Award for second baseman. He was the first Met to win the award since Yoenis Céspedes in 2016. He also became the first Mets second baseman to win the award since Edgardo Alfonzo in 1999.

==== 2023 ====
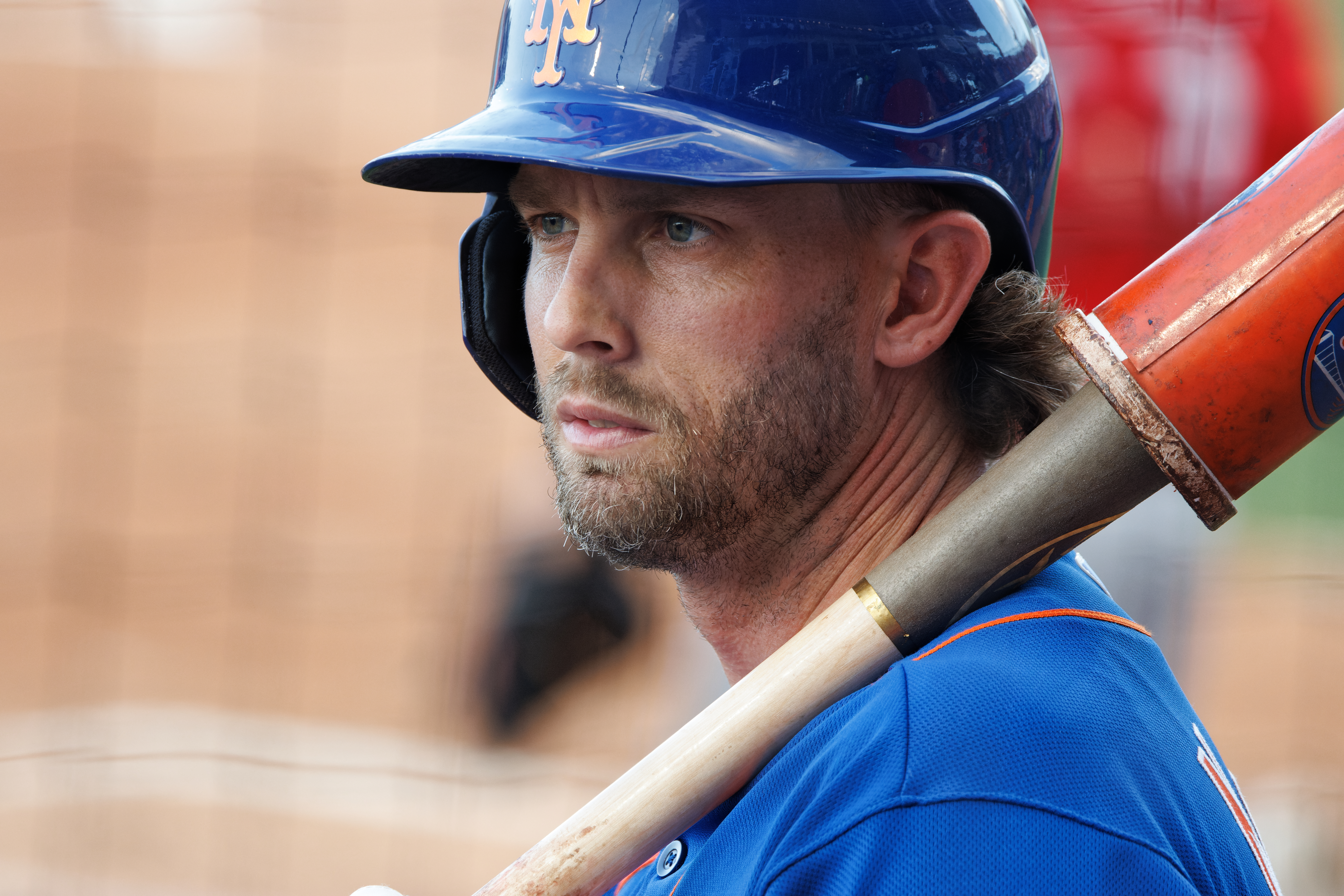
McNeil with the Mets in 2023

On January 27, 2023, McNeil agreed to a four-year, $50 million contract extension with the Mets including a fifth-year club option. On August 5, he hit the 50th home run of his career off of Baltimore Orioles starting pitcher Kyle Gibson. McNeil played in a career-high 156 games for the team in 2023, hitting .270/.333/.378 with 10 home runs, 55 RBI, and 10 stolen bases. On September 28, McNeil was placed on the injured list with a partially torn UCL in his right elbow. He additionally received a platelet-rich plasma injection, and avoided surgery.

==== 2024 ====
On September 6, 2024, McNeil fractured his right wrist when he was hit by a pitch from Cincinnati Reds pitcher Brandon Williamson, and it was revealed that he would likely miss 6–8 weeks, which ended his regular season. On September 8, the Mets placed McNeil on the 10-day injured list, ending his season after 129 games, in which he slashed .238/.308/.384 with 12 home runs and 44 RBI. After missing the first two rounds of the Mets' postseason run, McNeil was added to their 26-man roster for the 2024 NLCS. He hit two sacrifice flies in Game 5 and had a 9th inning RBI single in Game 6 against the Los Angeles Dodgers. Across 5 games in the 2024 postseason, McNeil struggled as he went 2-for-11 (.182) with no home runs and 3 RBI.

==== 2025 ====
On March 13, 2025, McNeil suffered a low-grade right oblique strain and would begin the season on the injured list. On April 24, the Mets activated him from the IL and made his season debut the next day against the Washington Nationals. In his debut, he went 1-for-4 with no walks in a 5–4 loss. McNeil made 122 appearances for New York on the year, slashing .243/.335/.411 with 12 home runs and 54 RBI. Following the season, McNeil underwent a procedure to address thoracic outlet syndrome.

=== Athletics ===
On December 22, 2025, the Mets traded McNeil, along with cash considerations, to the Athletics in exchange for minor league pitcher Yordan Rodriguez. McNeil opened the 2026 season as the Athletics' primary second baseman. He made his Athletics debut on Opening Day against the Toronto Blue Jays on March 27, starting at second base and batting eighth in the lineup. He went hitless in two at-bats before recording his first hit with the Athletics the following day, a single off Mason Fluharty. From April 10–12, McNeil returned to Citi Field for the first time as a visiting player, receiving a standing ovation from Mets fans before collecting two hits in the series opener. He finished the three-game series 6-for-13 as the Athletics completed the first sweep of the Mets in franchise history. On April 21, McNeil hit his first home run of the season, a solo shot off Seattle Mariners pitcher Luis Castillo. On May 20, McNeil hit a game-tying solo home run in the ninth inning against the Los Angeles Angels off closer Kirby Yates, helping the Athletics rally for a 6–5 extra-inning victory. On August 1, during a game against the Detroit Tigers, McNeil hit a two-out RBI bunt single in the bottom of the ninth inning off closer Kenley Jansen, bringing the tying run to the plate. After Jansen recorded the final out to secure the Tigers' victory, he exchanged words with McNeil over the bunt, prompting both benches to clear before the situation was quickly defused. On August 9, McNeil recorded his 1,000th career hit with a single off Boston Red Sox pitcher Garrett Whitlock. He subsequently stole second base and scored the tying run in the eighth inning on Jonah Heim's RBI double as the Athletics rallied for a 4–3 victory. On September 7, McNeil hit a walk-off infield single with the bases loaded and two outs in the bottom of the ninth inning against Toronto Blue Jays closer Louis Varland, giving the Athletics a 6–5 victory. On October 30, the Athletics declined their club option making him a free agent.

== International career ==
McNeil played for the United States national baseball team at the 2023 World Baseball Classic (WBC). Across five games, McNeil had five walks and one hit (good for a .385 OBP), notably scoring two runs against Cuba in the semifinals. During the Championship Game against Japan, McNeil led off the seventh and ninth innings with the United States down 3–2. He was the only player to get on base in the final inning, working out a seven-pitch walk before opposing pitcher Shohei Ohtani got Mookie Betts to ground into a double play and struck out Mike Trout, resulting in a second-place finish for Team USA.

== Personal life ==
McNeil married his wife Tatiana (née DaSilva) on February 3, 2018 in Nipomo, California. The couple adopted a dog, named Ms. Willow McNeil, during the 2019 season, which became "a social media sensation". They have two children, a son and a daughter, born July 2022 and October 2024, respectively.

Despite giving up a professional golf career McNeil still plays regularly. He participated in the 2023 New York State Open and won the 2024 Hilton Grand Vacations Tournament of Champions celebrity division.
