= Nipomo High School =

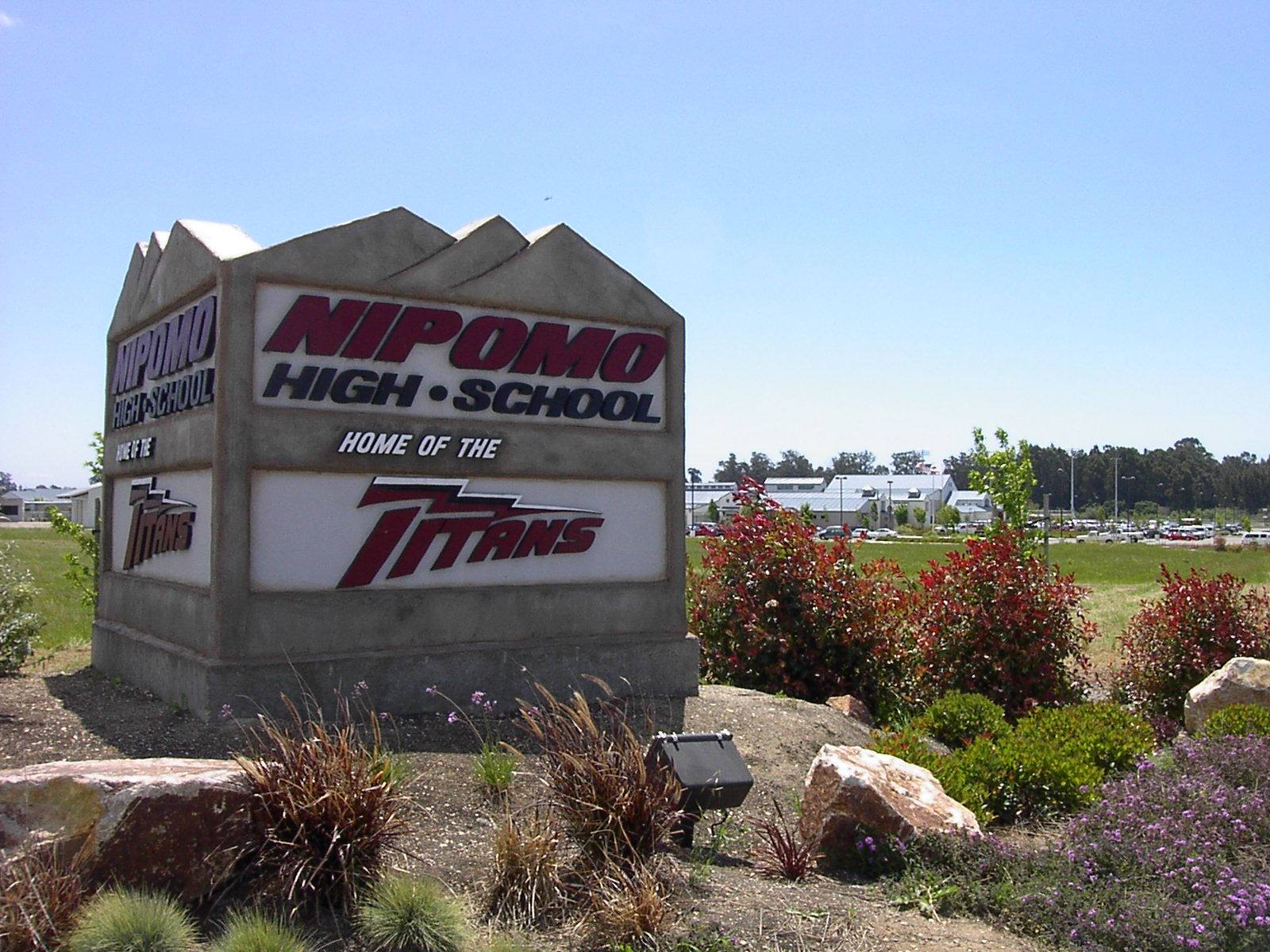

Location
- 525 North Thompson Road; Nipomo, California 93444; United States
- 35.049656°N 120.486867°W

Information
- Type: Public Secondary
- Established: 2002
- School district: Lucia Mar Unified School District
- Principal: John Denno
- Faculty: 61
- Teaching staff: 46.10 (FTE)
- Grades: 9-12
- Enrollment: 867 (2023–2024)
- Student to teacher ratio: 18.81
- Campus: Rural
- Colors: Cardinal; Black; Silver
- Mascot: Titan
- Rival: Arroyo Grande
- Website: nhstitans.org

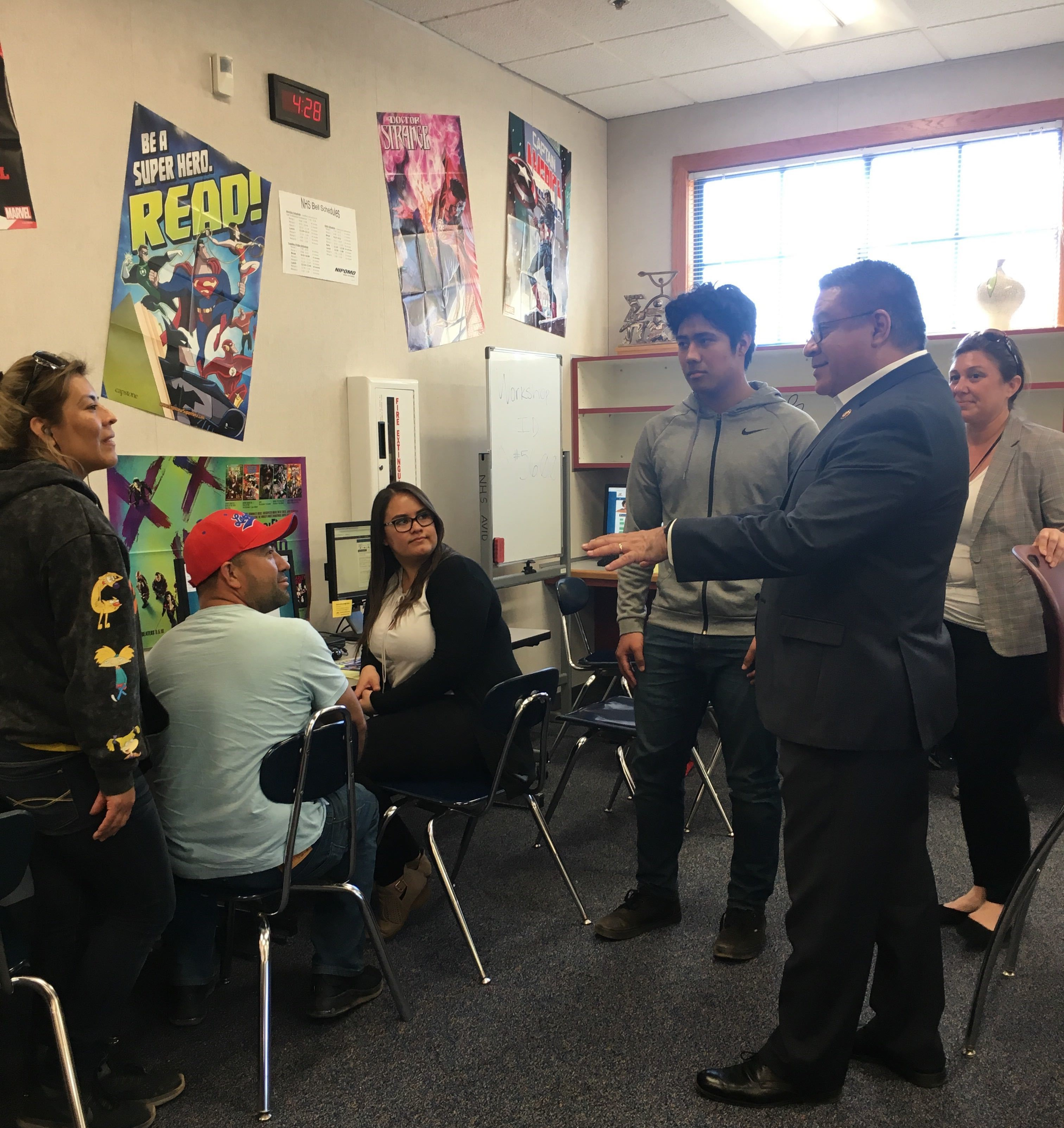
Congressman Salud Carbajal visiting with students at Nipomo High School in 2020.

Nipomo High School is an American public high school located in Nipomo, California. It serves grades 9-12 as part of the Lucia Mar Unified School District.

== History ==
Nipomo High School opened in 2002. Initially, students in Nipomo attended Arroyo Grande High School, however, due to overcrowding, the school was built. It is also home to Central Coast New Tech High, the only technical school in Central California from Thousand Oaks to San Jose.

== Sports ==
The Titans compete as members of the Central Coast Athletic Association.

=== CIF Championships ===
- Football: 2014 (Southern Section, Northwest Division)
- Boys Swimming: 2018 (Southern Section, Division 3)

== Notable alumni ==
- Jeff McNeil, pro baseball player/All-Star for the New York Mets
- Akeem King, pro football player for the Seattle Seahawks/Atlanta Falcons; played in Super Bowl LI

== Demographics ==
2005-2006

- 1,277 students; M/F (50.7/49.3)

White	Hispanic	African American	Asian	American Indian	Filipino	Pacific Islander	No response
56.9%	36.7%	1.2%	1.1%	0.6%	0.5%	0.5%	2.4%

- 66 certified staff;

White	Hispanic	Filipino	African American	Pacific Islander	American Indian	Asian	No response
86.4%	7.6%	3.0%	1.5%	1.5%	0.0%	0.0%	0.0%

During the 2008–2009 school year, Nipomo High School had an enrollment of 1,215 with an average class size of 26.1 students.

== See also ==
- San Luis Obispo County high schools
