= Akeem King =

American football player (born 1992)

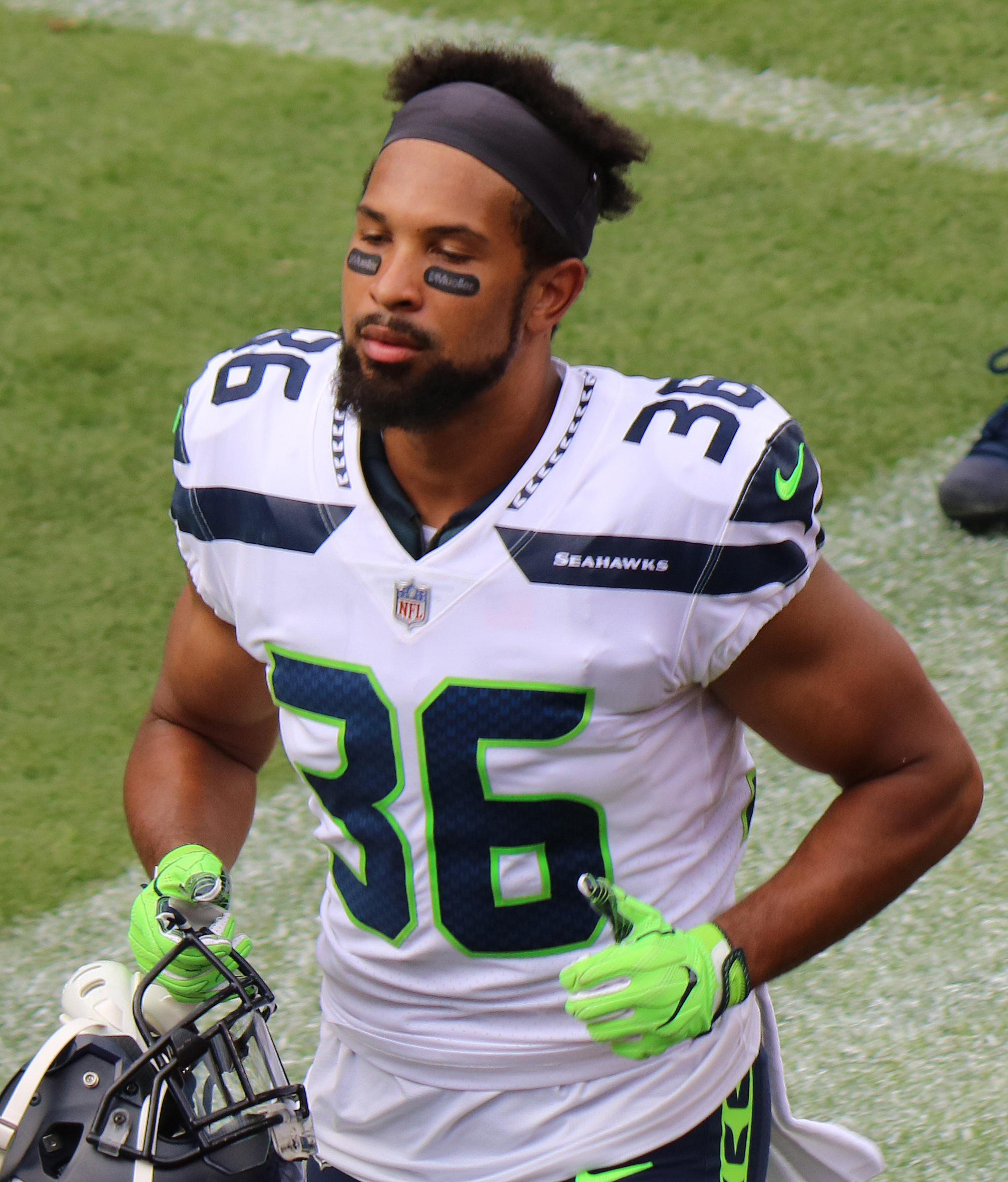
- King with the Seattle Seahawks in 2018

No. 28, 36
- Position: Cornerback

Personal information
- Born: August 29, 1992 (age 34); Visalia, California, U.S.
- Listed height: 6 ft 1 in (1.85 m)
- Listed weight: 215 lb (98 kg)

Career information
- High school: Nipomo (Nipomo, California)
- College: San Jose State
- NFL draft: 2015: 7th round, 249th overall pick

Career history
- Atlanta Falcons (2015−2016); Seattle Seahawks (2017–2019); Buffalo Bills (2020)*; Miami Dolphins (2020)*
- * Offseason or practice squad member only

Career NFL statistics
- Total tackles: 39
- Pass deflections: 3
- Stats at Pro Football Reference

Akeem Jerome King (born August 29, 1992) is an American former professional football player who was a cornerback in the National Football League (NFL). He played college football for the San Jose State Spartans and was selected by the Atlanta Falcons in the seventh round of the 2015 NFL draft.

== Early life ==
Born in Visalia, California, King graduated from Nipomo High School in 2010. King lettered in football, track, and basketball at Nipomo High and played three offensive positions (fullback, wide receiver, and tight end) and two defensive positions (cornerback and linebacker). During track & field season, he set the Titans' school record for the 100-meter dash in 10.74 seconds.

In his senior season, King had 4 touchdowns, 30 tackles, and 2 interceptions. A two-star recruit, King attracted one offer from San Jose State. On January 17, 2010, King signed with San Jose State.

College recruiting
Name	Hometown	School	Height	Weight	40^{‡}	Commit date
Akeem King; WR	Nipomo, CA	Nipomo HS	6 ft 3 in (1.91 m)	190 lb (86 kg)	4.50	Jan 17, 2010
Akeem King; WR	Recruit ratings: Scout: Rivals: 247Sports:					
Overall recruit ranking: Scout: 342 (national), 50 (CA), 76 (school) Rivals: 88 (school) 247Sports: 265 (national), 93 (school)
‡ Refers to 40-yard dash; Note: In many cases, Scout, Rivals, 247Sports, On3, and ESPN may conflict in their listings of height, weight and 40 time.; In these cases, the average was taken. ESPN grades are on a 100-point scale.; Sources: "2010 San Jose St. Football Commitment List". Rivals.; "2010 San Jose State Football Recruiting". Scout.; "Scout.com Team Recruiting Rankings". Scout.; "2010 Team Ranking". Rivals.com.; "San Jose State 2010 Football Commits". 247Sports.

== College career ==
Initially recruited as a wide receiver in Mike MacIntyre's first recruiting class at San Jose State University, King redshirted his freshman season in 2010, then switched to safety. As a redshirt freshman in 2011, King played the final two games of the season on special teams.

In his sophomore season of 2012, King played eight games, including San Jose State's win in the 2012 Military Bowl, all on special teams.

King played all 11 games in the season as a junior in 2013. He began playing as a reserve defensive back in addition to special teams. King had 15 tackles on the season and defended two passes, both in San Jose State's season-ending upset of #16 Fresno State.

King completed his Bachelor of Arts degree in business marketing in May 2014 and was enrolled in San Jose State's Master of Business Administration program for his senior football season. King started all 12 games of 2014. He had 71 tackles, including 1.5 tackles for loss, and two passes defended. On November 21, King had a career-high 11 tackles against Utah State.

== Professional career ==
Pre-draft measurables
Height	Weight	40-yard dash	10-yard split	20-yard split	20-yard shuttle	Three-cone drill	Vertical jump	Broad jump	Bench press
6 ft 1 1/2 in (1.87 m)	215 lb (98 kg)	4.41 s	1.59 s	2.61 s	4.38 s	7.08 s	37.5 in (0.95 m)	10 ft 2 in (3.10 m)	20 reps
Measurables were taken at Pro Day.

=== Atlanta Falcons ===
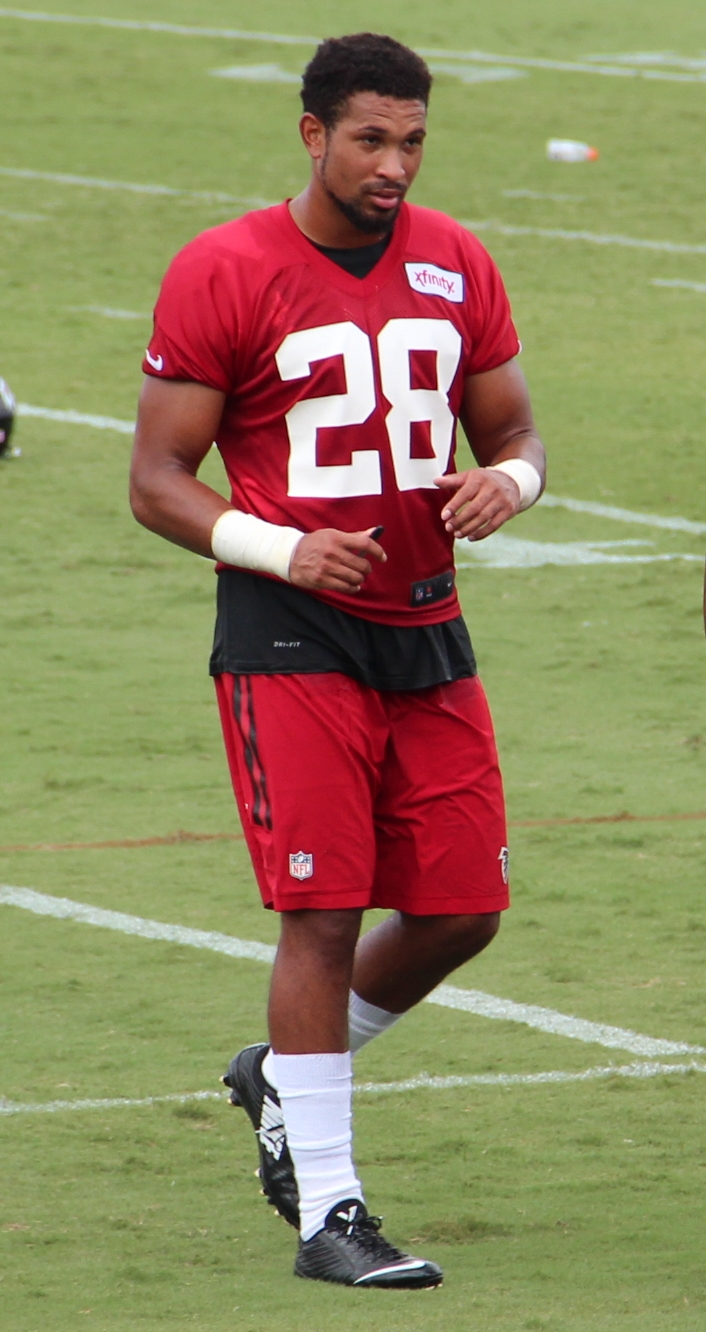
King at Atlanta Falcons training camp in 2015

King was selected by the Atlanta Falcons in the seventh round, 249th overall, in the 2015 NFL draft. On September 5, 2015, King was waived by the Falcons in the final cuts before the start of the regular season. On September 7, 2015, he was signed to the Falcons' practice squad. On November 6, 2015, he was elevated to the active roster.

On September 3, 2016, King was placed on injured reserve with a foot injury. In the 2016 season, the Falcons reached Super Bowl LI, but King did not get to participate due to his injury. The Falcons fell to the New England Patriots in a 34–28 overtime defeat.

On September 1, 2017, King was waived by the Falcons.

=== Seattle Seahawks ===
On September 13, 2017, King was signed to the Seattle Seahawks' practice squad. He re-signed with the Seahawks on March 16, 2018.

On September 1, 2018, King was waived by the Seahawks and was re-signed to the practice squad. He was promoted to the active roster on September 8, 2018.

=== Buffalo Bills ===
On August 2, 2020, King signed with the Buffalo Bills, but was released a week later.

=== Miami Dolphins ===
On December 2, 2020, King was signed to the Miami Dolphins' practice squad. His practice squad contract with the team expired after the season on January 11, 2021.
