= Arroyo Grande Valley AVA =

Appellation that designates wine in San Luis Obispo County, CA

Coordinates: 35°10′46″N 120°31′27″W

Arroyo Grande Valley
- Wine region
- Type: American Viticultural Area
- Year established: 1990
- Years of wine industry: 147
- Country: United States
- Part of: California, Central Coast AVA, San Luis Obispo County San Luis Obispo (SLO) Coast AVA
- Other regions in California, Central Coast AVA, San Luis Obispo County San Luis Obispo (SLO) Coast AVA: Edna Valley AVA
- Climate region: Region I-II
- Precipitation (annual average): 20 inches (510 mm)
- Soil conditions: Silty clay and sandy clay loam
- Total area: 42,880 acres (67 sq mi)
- Size of planted vineyards: 1,230 acres (498 ha)
- No. of vineyards: 4
- Grapes produced: Chardonnay, Counoise, Grenache, Mourvedre, Petite Sirah, Pinot blanc, Pinot gris, Pinot noir, Riesling, Sauvignon blanc, Syrah, Tempranillo, Viognier, Zinfandel, Picardan, Malbec, Alicante Bouschet, Carmenere, Barbera, Nebbiolo, Cabernet Franc, Blaufrankisch, Merlot, Picpoul Blanc, Fiano
- No. of wineries: 11

Arroyo Grande Valley is an American Viticultural Area (AVA) located in San Luis Obispo County, California approximately 12 miles (19 km) southeast of the county seat San Luis Obispo. It was established as the nation's 106^{th}, the state's 61^{st} and the county's fifth appellation on January 3, 1990 by the Bureau of Alcohol, Tobacco and Firearms (ATF), Treasury after reviewing the 1987 petition submitted by Don Talley, of Talley Vineyards, and William S. Greenough, of Saucelito Canyon Vineyard, proposing the viticultural area named "Arroyo Grande Valley."

The 16-mile (26 km) long, approximately 67-square-mile (42,880-acre) valley appellation benefits from its east-northeast orientation allowing the breeze from the Pacific Ocean to moderate the climate of the area. The valley is divided by a fog line produced by the cool maritime layer where Zinfandel, Petite Sirah and Rhône varietals are grown on the higher elevations near Lopez Lake and the cooler mid-valley vineyards being home to Chardonnay and Pinot noir. Within the viticultural area are four vineyards where 1,250 acres (506 ha) cultivate wine grapes and eleven bonded wineries consider Pinot Noir, Chardonnay and Syrah as the primary grapes. On April 8, 2022, the Alcohol and Tobacco Tax and Trade Bureau (TTB) approved the designation of the expansive San Luis Obispo (SLO) Coast AVA overlapping the boundaries of Edna Valley and Arroyo Grande Valley viticultural areas because they share common features. However, these two previously established areas still have unique characteristics to retain their viticultural area distinctions within SLO Coast. Edna Valley lies immediately to the northwest, the Los Padres National Forest straddles the north leg boundary, the Santa Maria Valley AVA lies to the southeast of Arroyo Grande Valley, and the Pacific coastal communities of Oceano, Grover City and Arroyo Grande abut its southwestern border.

== History ==
Viticulture history in the San Luis Obispo region dates back to 1804 when Mission grapes vineyards were planted at the county's historic landmarks, Mission San Luis Obispo de Tolosa and Mission San Miguel Arcángel. The size of the Mission San Luis Obispo vineyard was estimated to be 40 acres (16 ha) and the Mission San Miguel vineyards were 18 acres (7.3 ha). The mission at San Luis Obispo farmed the bottom lands in the valley from 1780 until 1842 when the Mexican governor granted "Rancho Arroyo Grande" to Zefarino Carlon. Arroyo Grande translates to "wide riverbed" in Spanish. Today, the names "Arroyo Grande" and "Arroyo Grande Valley" can be found on many maps of the area.

In 1870s, Henry Ditmas was originally a sheepherder settling in Arroyo Grande Valley. After a severe drought, he moved his herd to the Sierra Nevadas where a spring snowstorm killed most of the flock. Ditmas eventually filed a government claim for 560 acres adjoining Ranchita Arroyo Grande; he named it Rancho "Saucelito" for its many bordering willow trees as "Saucelito" means "willow trees." The land was cleared and Henry planted Zinfandel and Muscat grapevines imported from Europe and purchased locally according to the Ditmas family. This is the first documented planting of Zinfandel in the upper Arroyo Grande Valley. Commercial vineyards were first planted in 1880 in Saucelito Canyon. "Saucelito" meaning willow trees. The oldest winery in San Luis Obispo County, St. Remy, was also established in Saucelito Canyon in 1880 and produced wines until Prohibition. This winery identifies itself as being from Arroyo Grande Valley.

== Terroir ==
=== Topography ===
Arroyo Grande Valley extends 16 miles (26 km) lying on a northeast–southwest axis whereas both Edna Valley and Santa Maria Valley are oriented on a northwest–southeast axis. The northeast–southwest orientation of Arroyo Grande Valley promotes a prevailing southwesterly winds and some protection from northwest winds. This feature distinguishes the Arroyo Grande Valley from the other areas of the county, yet shares many climate characteristics similar to neighboring Edna Valley AVA to the northwest. The Arroyo Grande area is west of the Santa Lucia mountain range and experiences the moderating coastal influences. The western boundary of the viticultural area is about 3 miles (5 km) directly east of the Pacific Ocean at Grover City. The principal stream in the area is the Arroyo Grande Creek which meanders approximately 12 miles (19 km) in a southwesterly direction from the spillway of Lopez Lake to the Pacific Ocean. The viticultural area includes substantially all the drainage of the Arroyo Grande Creek including the (upper) Arroyo Grande Creek. Feeding waters into the Arroyo Grande Creek are Tar Spring Creek, Los Berros Creek and Lopez Lake into which flow the (upper) Arroyo Grande Creek, Wittenberg Creek and the creek in Lopez Canyon. Tributaries to the (upper) Arroyo Grande Creek are Phoenix Creek and Saucelito Creek. The valley floor ranges from sea level to a 400 feet (120 m) above sea level while the higher elevations from300 to 1,000 feet (91–305 m). Present grape plantings are on low hills near the valley floor.

=== Climate ===
The primary characteristic distinguishing Arroyo Grande Valley from neighboring areas is its climate. The climate ranges from high Region I to Region II as classified by University of California, Davis' Winkler scale. The climate, during the growing season, is influenced by the close proximity of the Arroyo Grande Valley to the Pacific Ocean. The valley experiences a long dry moderate summer season and a mild winter season. The marine air produces frequent morning and evening fog which distinguishes the area from inland areas of San Luis Obispo County which are not as open to the ocean and have much higher summer temperatures and colder winter temperatures. The climate during the months of March, April and May is dominated by a strong onshore air flow bringing cold winds which delay early season growing and fruit set of the grapevines. Because the Arroyo Grande Valley is shielded by the mountain range on the northwest side, the effects of the onshore air flow are moderated. The average rainfall is 20 inches (508 mm) with about 80 percent of the rain falling between December and March. During the summer growing season, the sun shines more than 90 percent of the day. Temperatures of 100 °F (38 °C) occur nearly every year. Average maximum readings for July are in the 90's and range from about 92 °F (33 °C) at higher elevations to 98 °F (37 °C) at lower elevations with occasional highs ranging from 110 to 115 °F (43–46 °C). Fog in the summer keeps the valley cool and would designate it as a Region I. The fog usually burns back in the late morning hours, which gives a gentle warming in the afternoon, ideal for good grape quality. The climate of the area is characterized by cool summer night temperatures, often dropping up to 30 °F (−1 °C) below daytime highs. The Arroyo Grande Valley, as a whole, is slightly warmer than the Santa Maria Valley viticultural area to the south, and somewhat cooler than the Edna Valley and Paso Robles viticultural areas to the north, as determined by the average total number of GDD during the growing season. Arroyo Grande Valley usually gets more precipitation each year than the Santa Maria Valley and Paso Robles areas. Edna Valley, to the immediate northwest, usually gets just slightly less precipitation than Arroyo Grande Valley. The USDA plant hardiness zone is 9a to 10a.

=== Soil ===
The Arroyo Grande Valley terrain varies from shallow and moderately deep, moderately sloping to extremely steep and well drained. Soils on the valley floor are very deep, generally level to moderately sloping, somewhat poorly drained and well drained silty clay loam and sandy clay loam. The land is composed of sedimentary and volcanic soils over a layer of bedrock known as the Franciscan Complex which is uplifted oceanic and continental crust formed over 100 million years ago.

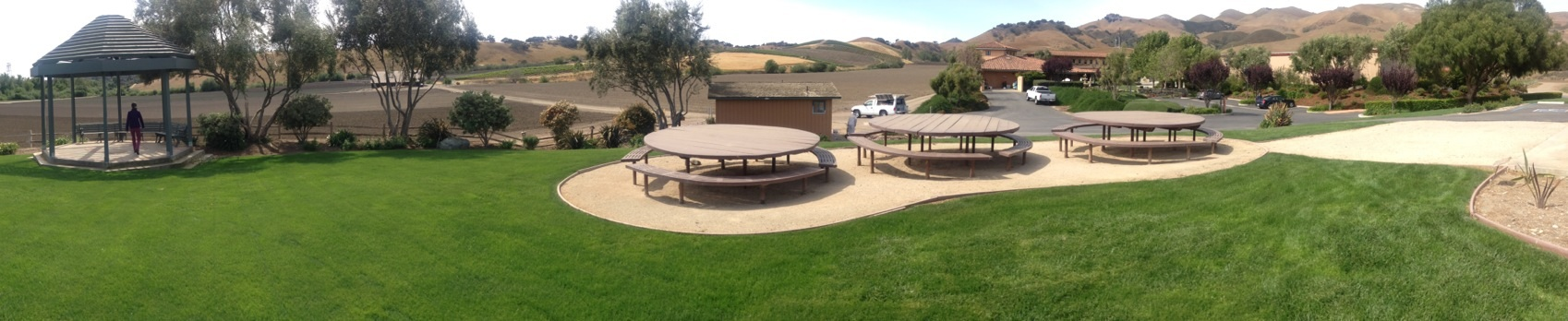
Talley Vineyards on Lopez Drive in the heart of the Arroyo Grande Valley.
