= Nipomo, California =

- Unincorporated town Census-designated place
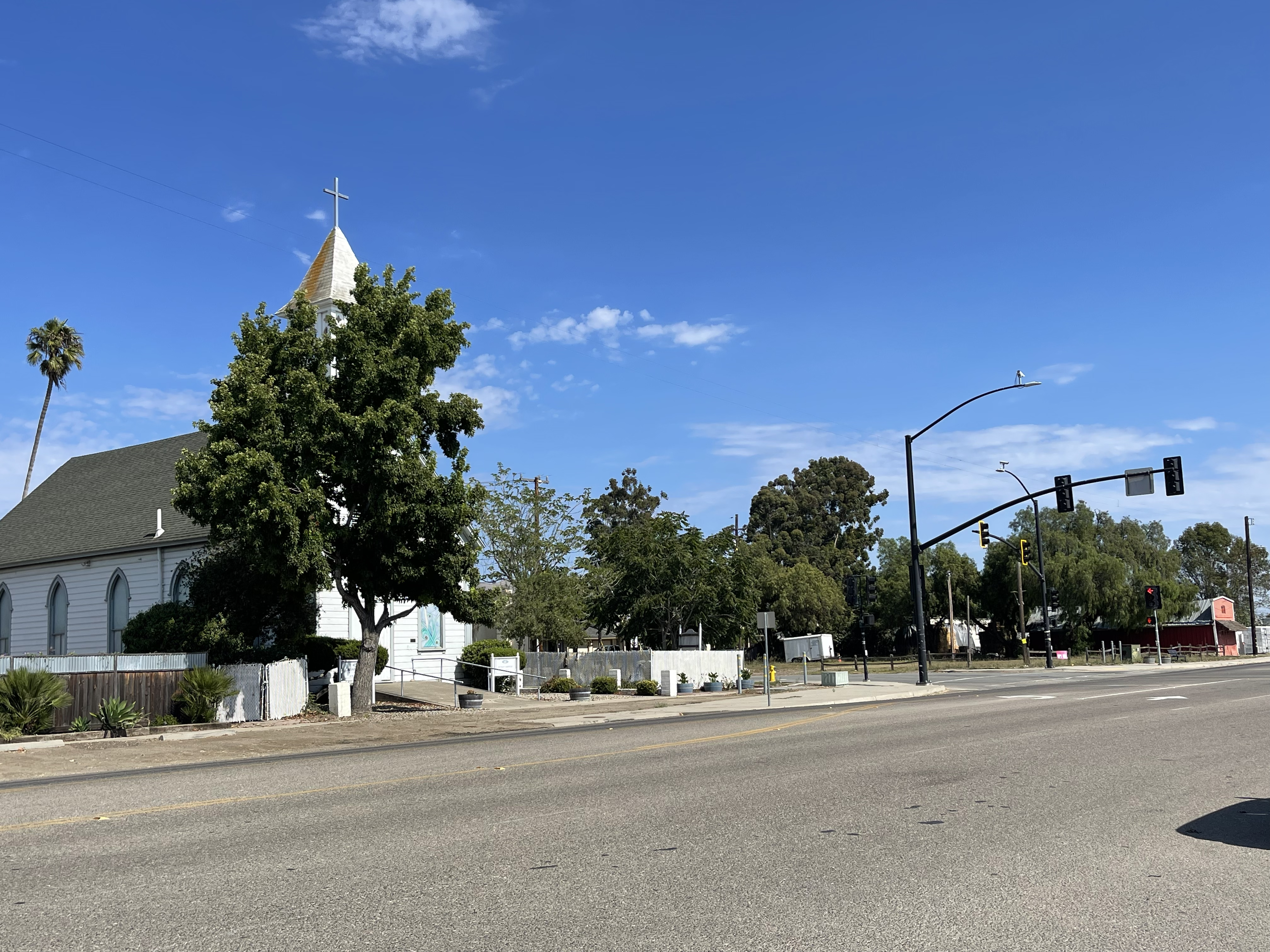
- Olde Towne Nipomo in 2023.
- Interactive map of Nipomo, California
- Location in California Location in the United States
- Coordinates: 35°1′48″N 120°29′24″W
- Country: United States
- State: California
- County: San Luis Obispo
- Named for: "Place of the big house" or "Village"

Area
  - Total: 15.075 sq mi (39.045 km^{2})
  - Land: 15.075 sq mi (39.044 km^{2})
  - Water: 0.00039 sq mi (0.001 km^{2}) 0%
- Elevation: 331 ft (101 m)

Population (2020)
  - Total: 18,176
  - Density: 1,205.7/sq mi (465.53/km^{2})
- Time zone: UTC-8 (Pacific (PST))
  - Summer (DST): UTC-7 (PDT)
- ZIP code: 93444
- Area code: 805
- FIPS code: 06-51476
- GNIS feature ID: 1652759

Nipomo (/nəˈpoʊmoʊ/; Chumash: Nipumuʔ) is an unincorporated town in San Luis Obispo County, California, United States. The population was 16,714 for the 2010 census and grew to 18,176 for the 2020 census. For statistical purposes, the United States Census Bureau has defined Nipomo as a census-designated place (CDP).

== Name ==
The name is the Spanish transliteration of the Obispeño Chumash place name Nipumuʔ, meaning "place of the big house" or "village".

== History ==
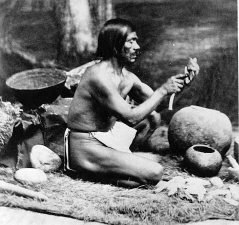
Late 19th-century photograph of Chumash chief Rafael Solares

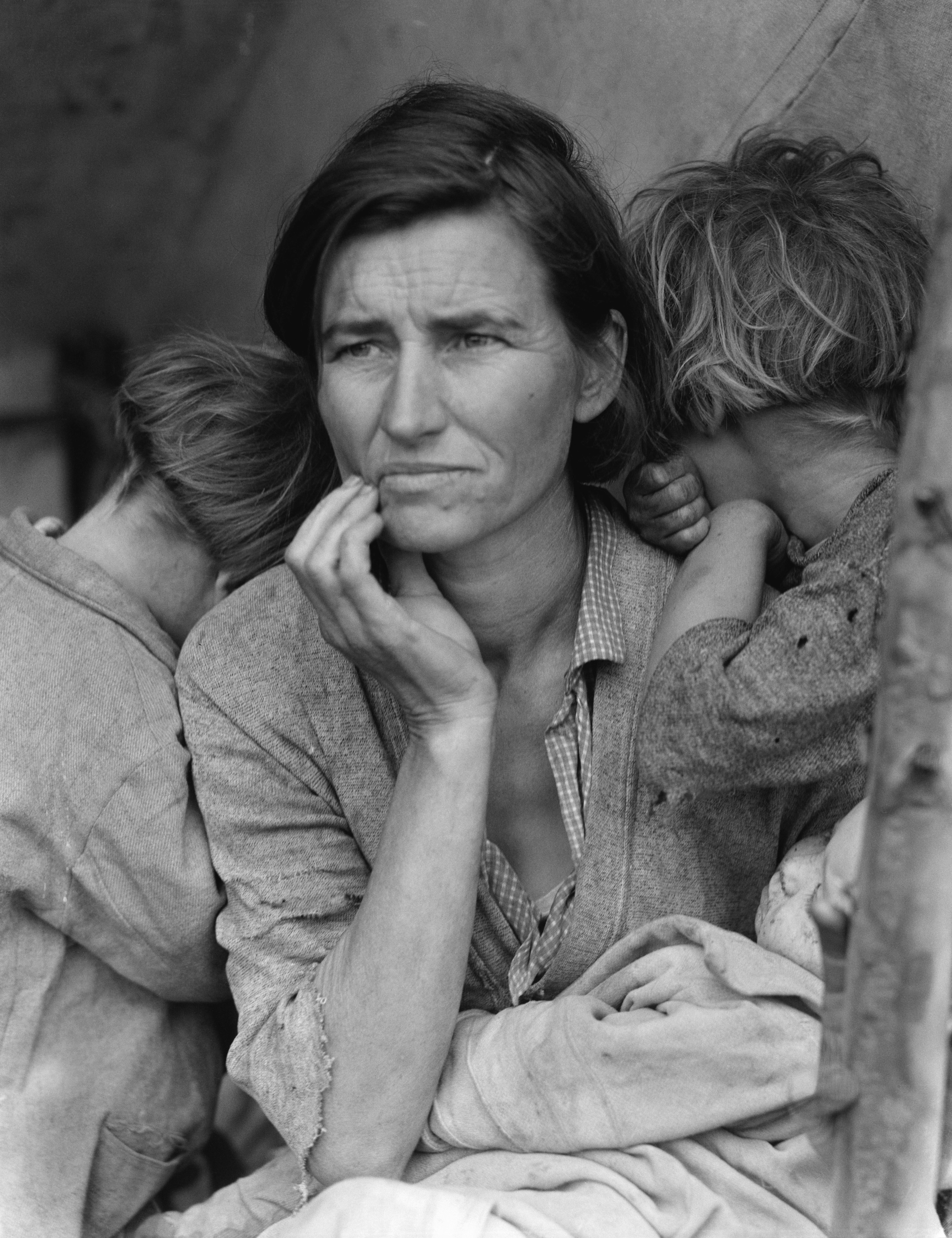
Dorothea Lange's famed portrait, Migrant Mother, taken in Nipomo in 1936.

The original settlers of Nipomo were the Chumash Indians, who have lived in the area for over 9,000 years. Rancho Nipomo (the Chumash word ne-po-mah meant "foot of the hill") was one of the first and largest of the Mexican land grants in San Luis Obispo County.

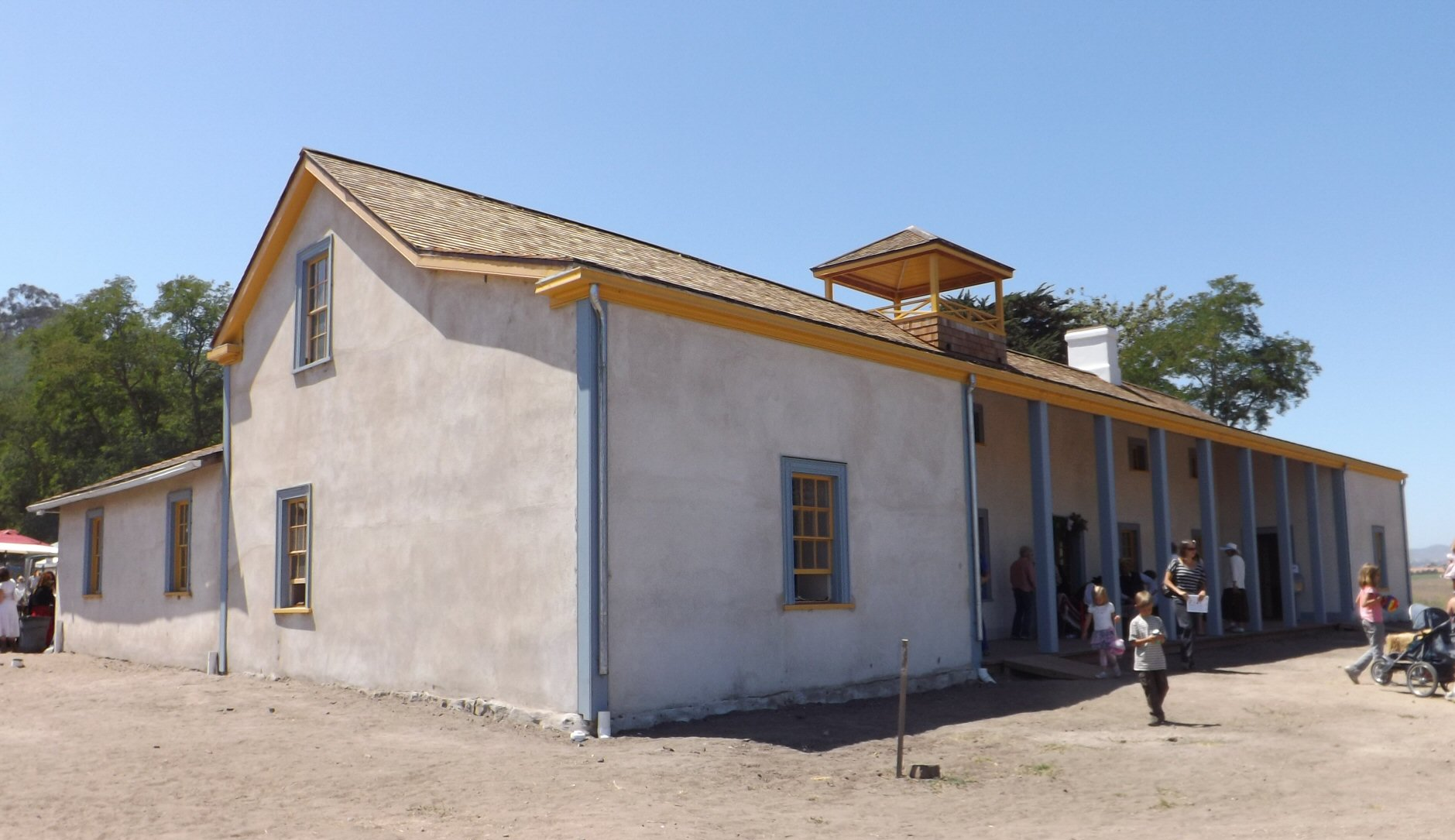
Dana Adobe

William G. Dana of Boston, a sea captain whose travels led him to California, married Maria Josefa Carrillo of Santa Barbara. In 1837, the 38,000-acre (150 km^{2}) Rancho Nipomo was granted to Captain Dana by the Mexican governor. The Dana Adobe, created in 1839, served as an important stop for travelers on El Camino Real between Mission San Luis Obispo and Mission Santa Barbara. The adobe was a stage coach stop and became the exchange point for mail going between north and south in the first regular mail route in California. The Danas had several children, thirteen of whom reached adulthood. They learned both English and Spanish, as well as the language of the Chumash natives.

In 1846, U.S. Army Captain John C. Fremont and his soldiers stopped at the rancho on their way south to Santa Barbara and Los Angeles. Captain Dana hosted a barbecue and gave Fremont's men 30 fresh horses. By the 1880s, the Dana descendants had built homes on the rancho and formed a town. Streets were laid out and lots were sold to the general public. The Pacific Coast Railway (narrow gauge) came to town in 1882, and trains ran through Nipomo until the Great Depression in the 1930s. By the end of 1942, the tracks had been removed for the World War II war effort.

Thousands of blue gum eucalyptus trees were planted on the Nipomo Mesa in 1909 by two men who formed the Los Berros Forest Company with the idea of selling the trees as hardwood. Groves of these non-native trees still exist in rows as they were originally planted.

Nipomo Mesa is the location of one of the most famous photographs of the Great Depression, Migrant Mother, by Dorothea Lange.

== Geography ==
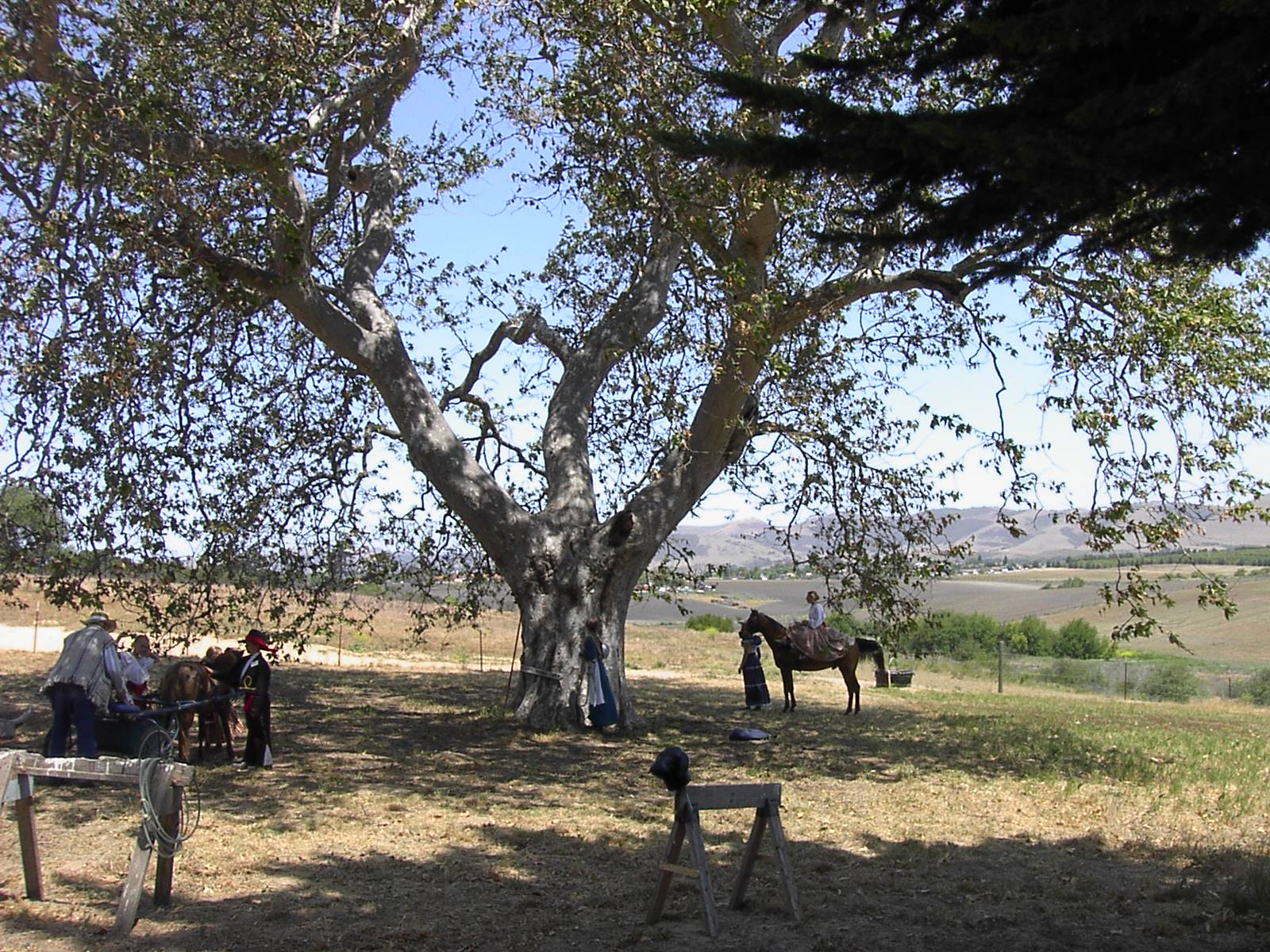
Capt. Dana Tree at the Dana Adobe.

According to the United States Census Bureau, the CDP has a total area of 15.1 square miles (39 km^{2}), virtually all land.

=== Climate ===
This region experiences warm and dry summers, with no average monthly temperatures above 71.6 °F. According to the Köppen Climate Classification system, Nipomo has a warm-summer Mediterranean climate, abbreviated "Csb" on climate maps.

== Demographics ==
=== 2020 census ===
As of the 2020 census, Nipomo had a population of 18,176. The population density was 1,205.7 inhabitants per square mile (465.5/km^{2}). The median age was 39.5 years. 23.9% of residents were under the age of 18 and 17.7% of residents were 65 years of age or older. For every 100 females there were 97.0 males, and for every 100 females age 18 and over there were 95.5 males age 18 and over.

89.1% of residents lived in urban areas, while 10.9% lived in rural areas.

There were 6,065 households in Nipomo, of which 34.9% had children under the age of 18 living in them. Of all households, 56.4% were married-couple households, 13.5% were households with a male householder and no spouse or partner present, and 23.5% were households with a female householder and no spouse or partner present. About 18.7% of all households were made up of individuals and 10.4% had someone living alone who was 65 years of age or older.

There were 6,327 housing units, of which 4.1% were vacant. The homeowner vacancy rate was 1.0% and the rental vacancy rate was 3.1%.

Racial composition as of the 2020 census
Race	Number	Percent
White	10,223	56.2%
Black or African American	152	0.8%
American Indian and Alaska Native	340	1.9%
Asian	466	2.6%
Native Hawaiian and Other Pacific Islander	41	0.2%
Some other race	3,276	18.0%
Two or more races	3,678	20.2%
Hispanic or Latino (of any race)	8,041	44.2%

=== 2010 census ===
At the 2010 census Nipomo had a population of 16,714. The population density was 1,125.4 inhabitants per square mile (434.5/km^{2}). The racial makeup of Nipomo was 12,281 (73.5%) White, 177 (1.1%) African American, 200 (1.2%) Native American, 421 (2.5%) Asian, 33 (0.2%) Pacific Islander, 2,821 (16.9%) from other races, and 781 (4.7%) from two or more races. Hispanic or Latino of any race were 6,645 persons (39.8%).

The census reported that 16,703 people (99.9% of the population) lived in households, 11 (0.1%) lived in non-institutionalized group quarters, and no one was institutionalized.

There were 5,474 households, 2,258 (41.2%) had children under the age of 18 living in them, 3,353 (61.3%) were opposite-sex married couples living together, 686 (12.5%) had a female householder with no husband present, 326 (6.0%) had a male householder with no wife present. There were 338 (6.2%) unmarried opposite-sex partnerships, and 49 (0.9%) same-sex married couples or partnerships. 807 households (14.7%) were one person and 346 (6.3%) had someone living alone who was 65 or older. The average household size was 3.05. There were 4,365 families (79.7% of households); the average family size was 3.35.

The age distribution was 4,422 people (26.5%) under the age of 18, 1,531 people (9.2%) aged 18 to 24, 4,058 people (24.3%) aged 25 to 44, 4,593 people (27.5%) aged 45 to 64, and 2,110 people (12.6%) who were 65 or older. The median age was 37.0 years. For every 100 females, there were 97.8 males. For every 100 females age 18 and over, there were 94.9 males.

There were 5,759 housing units at an average density of 387.8 per square mile, of the occupied units 3,898 (71.2%) were owner-occupied and 1,576 (28.8%) were rented. The homeowner vacancy rate was 1.7%; the rental vacancy rate was 3.1%. 11,583 people (69.3% of the population) lived in owner-occupied housing units and 5,120 people (30.6%) lived in rental housing units.

=== 2000 census ===
At the 2000 census there were 12,626 people, 4,035 households, and 3,316 families in the CDP. The population density was 1,106.1 inhabitants per square mile (427.1/km^{2}). There were 4,146 housing units at an average density of 363.2 per square mile (140.2/km^{2}). The racial makeup of the CDP was 75.9% White, 0.6% African American, 1.3% Native American, 1.4% Asian, 0.1% Pacific Islander, 16.0% from other races, and 4.7% from two or more races. Hispanic or Latino of any race were 34.6%.

Of the 4,035 households 41.4% had children under the age of 18 living with them, 66.9% were married couples living together, 10.9% had a female householder with no husband present, and 17.8% were non-families. 13.5% of households were one person and 6.6% were one person aged 65 or older. The average household size was 3.13 and the average family size was 3.42.

The age distribution was 30.7% under the age of 18, 7.5% from 18 to 24, 27.9% from 25 to 44, 21.7% from 45 to 64, and 12.1% 65 or older. The median age was 36 years. For every 100 females, there were 97.4 males. For every 100 females age 18 and over, there were 93.2 males.

The median household income was $49,852 and the median family income was $54,338. Males had a median income of $41,288 versus $25,509 for females. The per capita income for the CDP was $18,824. About 5.6% of families and 7.3% of the population were below the poverty line, including 9.5% of those under age 18 and 6.1% of those age 65 or over.

== Parks and recreation ==
Nipomo Community Park is seventy-four acres (30 ha) and includes hiking, horseback riding, a dog park, and a skate park.

The Dana Adobe is listed on the National Register of Historic Places. The entire Rancho Nipomo is listed as a California Historical Landmark.

== Government ==
In the California State Legislature, Nipomo is in the 21st senatorial district, represented by Democrat Monique Limón, and the 37th Assembly district, represented by Democrat Gregg Hart.

In the United States House of Representatives, Nipomo is in California's 24th congressional district, represented by Democrat Salud Carbajal.

== Education ==
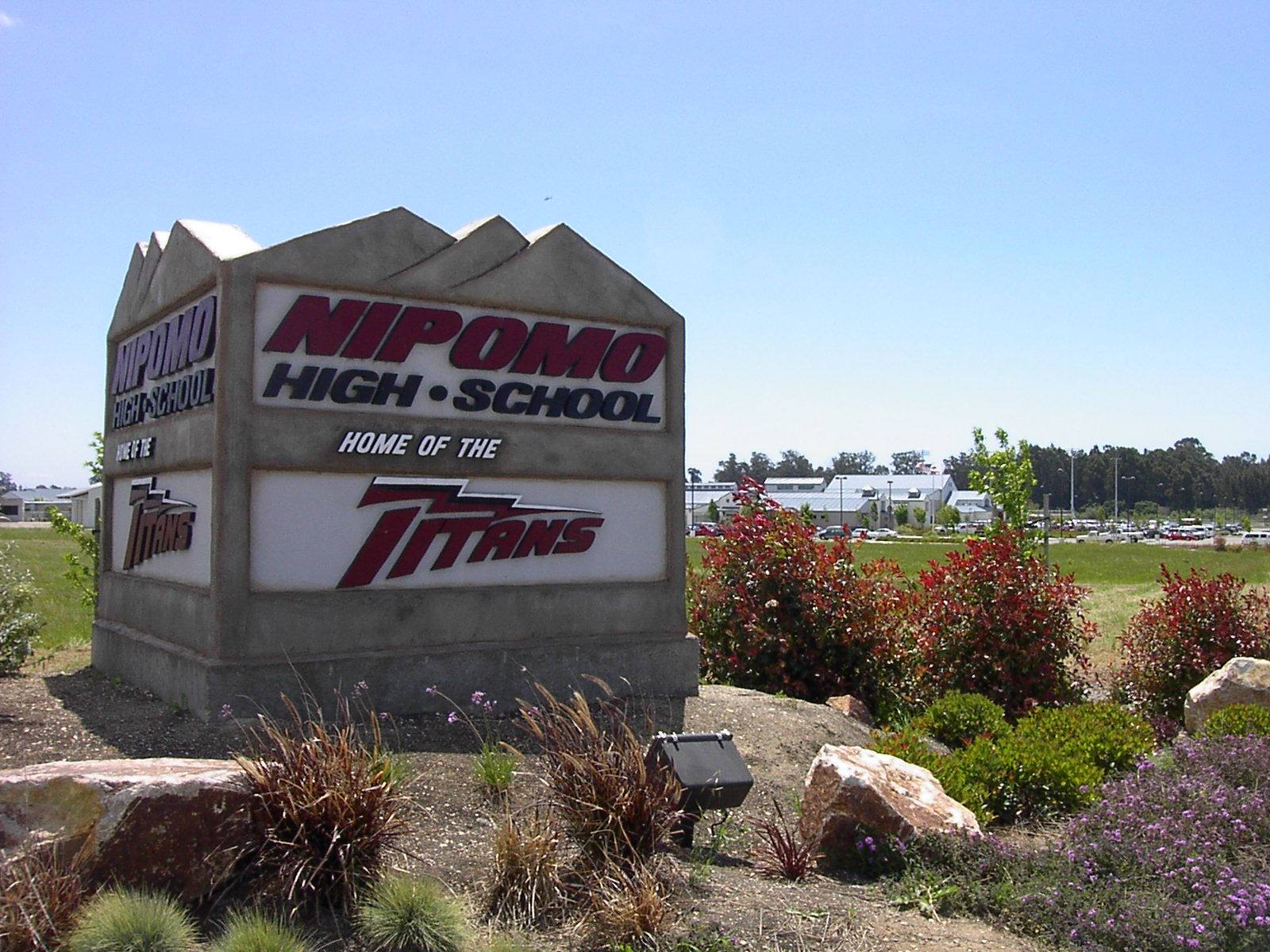
The entrance to Nipomo High School

=== Colleges and universities ===
  - Allan Hancock College, Santa Maria
  - Cuesta College, San Luis Obispo
  - California Polytechnic State University San Luis Obispo (Cal Poly)

=== School district ===
Nipomo is served by the Lucia Mar Unified School District.

- Elementary
  - Nipomo Elementary (K-6) 190 E Price, Nipomo. Attended primarily by students living east of US 101.
  - Dana Elementary (K-6) 920 W. Tefft St., Nipomo. For students west of US 101 living nearby.
  - Dorothea Lange Elementary (K-6) 1661 Via Alta Mesa, Nipomo. Attended by other Nipomo area students living west of US 101.
- Middle school
  - Mesa Middle School (7th-8th) 2555 Halcyon Road, Arroyo Grande. Located within original Rancho Nipomo boundaries. Stresses character education, and competes in basketball, volleyball, wrestling, track, and soccer. Also known for drama and music programs.
- High school
  - Nipomo High School (9th-12th) 525 N. Thompson Road, Nipomo. It was opened in 2002. Before that students attended Arroyo Grande High School.
  - Central Coast New Tech High School (9th-12th). Is a public charter school opened in 2012 with a freshman class. The school added a freshman class each year, reaching all four classes in the 2015–2016 school year.

== Notable people ==
- Casey Alexander (b 1975) screenwriter (SpongeBob SquarePants, Uncle Grandpa)
- Akeem King (b 1992) is a former NFL player for the Atlanta Falcons and Seattle Seahawks.
- Mike Lamond (b 1987), more commonly known by his online alias Husky or HuskyStarcraft, is a former sports commentator, YouTuber, director, and voice actor.
- Jeff McNeil (b 1992), is a professional baseball player for the New York Mets.
- Leigh Rubin - creator of the syndicated comic strip Rubes
- Florence Owens Thompson (1903–1983) was an American woman who was the subject of Dorothea Lange's photograph Migrant Mother (1936)
- Don Siegel (1912–1991) was an American film and television director and producer

== Infrastructure ==
The Nipomo Community Services District, a Special-purpose district, provides a majority of the town with water with the rest of the community being services by Golden State Water.

== See also ==
- Guadalupe-Nipomo Dunes
