= Edna Valley AVA =

American Viticultural Areas in San Luis Obispo County, California

Coordinates: 35°13′02″N 120°36′27″W

Edna Valley
- Wine region
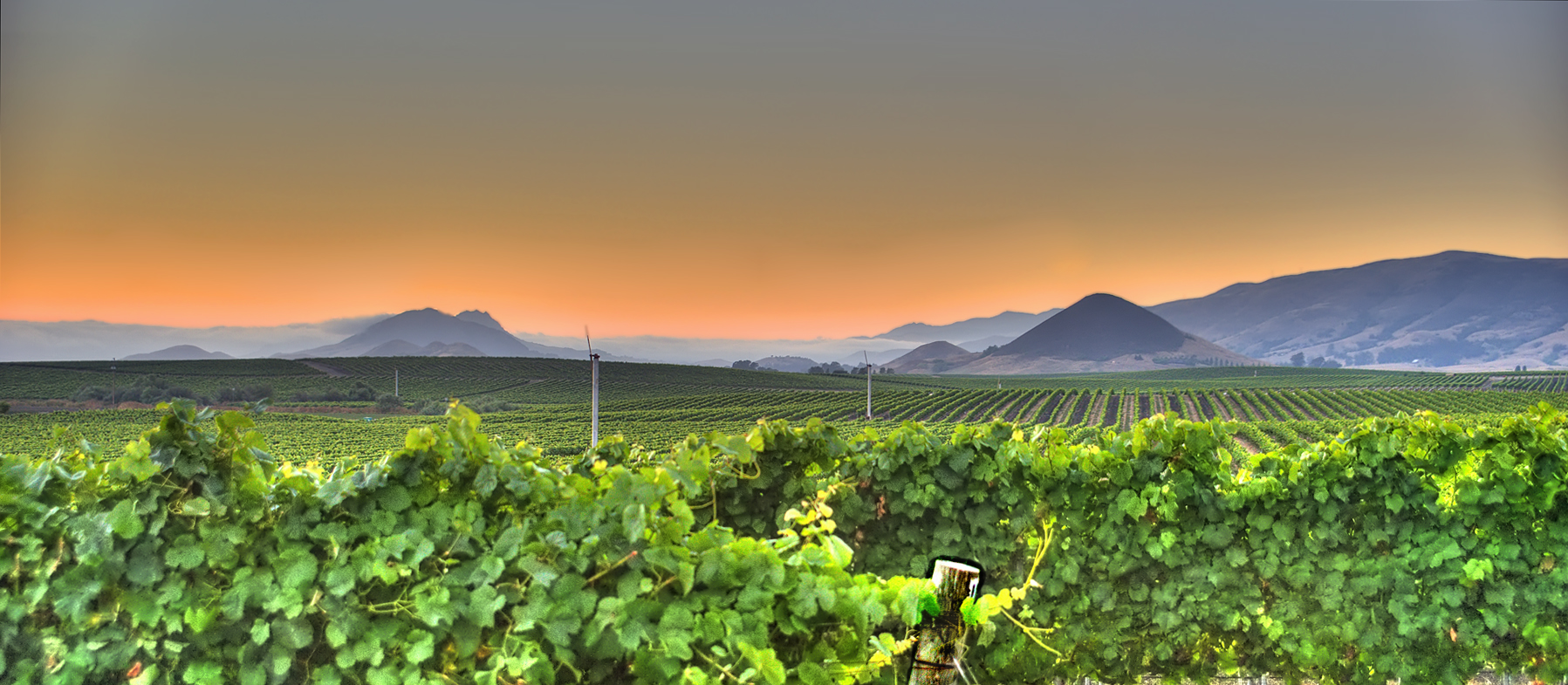
- View from Edna Valley Winery
- Type: American Viticultural Area
- Year established: 1982; 1987 Amended
- Years of wine industry: 53
- Country: United States
- Part of: California, Central Coast AVA, San Luis Obispo County, San Luis Obispo Coast AVA
- Other regions in California, Central Coast AVA, San Luis Obispo County, San Luis Obispo Coast AVA: Arroyo Grande Valley AVA
- Growing season: 287 days
- Climate region: Region I-II
- Precipitation (annual average): 20 in (510 mm)
- Soil conditions: Sandy clay loam, clay loam or clay
- Total area: 22,400 acres (35 sq mi)
- Size of planted vineyards: 1,000 acres (400 ha)
- No. of vineyards: 20
- Grapes produced: Albarino, Chardonnay, Grenache, Merlot, Mourvedre, Petite Sirah, Pinot gris, Pinot noir, Sauvignon blanc, Syrah, Teroldego, Viognier
- No. of wineries: about 36

Edna Valley is an American Viticultural Area (AVA) located in San Luis Obispo (SLO) County, California encompassing the rural town of Edna which is nine miles (14 km) southeast of the county seat San Luis Obispo and north of the small coastal town Arroyo Grande. It was established as the nation's eleventh, the state's eighth and the county's second appellation on May 12, 1982 by the Bureau of Alcohol, Tobacco and Firearms (ATF), Treasury after reviewing the petition submitted by Edna Valley Vineyard, Paragon Vineyard, Chamisal Vineyard, Lawrence Winery and MacGregor Vineyards proposing a viticultural area in San Luis Obispo County named "Edna Valley.”

The viticultural area resides within California's multi-county Central Coast AVA and became a sub-appellation in the county's newest San Luis Obispo Coast (SLO Coast) viticultural area in April 2022. The valley is diagonally flanked by Lake Lopez to the south and Islay Hill to the north. The elongated valley extends along a northwest–southeast axis bordered to the west by the Santa Lucia Mountains and surrounded by volcanic mountains and characterized by black humus and clay-rich soils. With moderate sunshine, cool maritime fog, and rich oceanic and volcanic soils, the Edna Valley appellation has California's longest growing season. The valley is kept cool by breezes from the Pacific Ocean and morning fog. The extended growing season allows complex flavors to develop in the grapes. The region is best known for its Chardonnay, Pinot Noir and Syrah. The USDA plant hardiness zone is 9b to 10a.

== History ==
Edna Valley derives its name from the small community of Edna founded about 1883. The name "Edna" was first used in a recorded lease document in 1899. Over the ensuing years the valley became locally known as Edna Valley. After evaluating the petition and the comments received, ATF determined that the Edna Valley viticultural area has a unique historical identity and that "Edna Valley" is the most appropriate name for the area. Viticulture in the San Luis Obispo region historically dates back to the 1800s, but not in Edna Valley. Instead, the valley, with its optimal climate, fertile soils and long growing season, established itself, in the 19th century, for dairy, butter and cheese operations while agricultural crops including garbanzo beans, oats, barley, wheat and hay were grown. Additionally, apple, apricot, lemon, orange, peach and pear orchards were planted. Livestock including cattle, chickens, and horses were raised and grazed in the Edna Valley. This local agribusiness culture thrived for the next 90 years. However, in the 1970s, the valley experienced a winemaking revival when new vineyards were planted in what is currently known as Edna Valley Vineyard. Edna Valley wines are often grouped with those of the contiguous Arroyo Grande Valley AVA.

== Terroir ==
=== Topography ===
Edna Valley is a natural, elongated valley consisting of approximately 35 sq mi (22,000 acres). It is oriented along a northwest–southeast axis well defined by the Santa Lucia Mountains on the northeast side; a low, hilly complex on the southeast; and the San Luis Range on the southwest. The northwest border merges into the Los Osos Valley just beyond the town of San Luis Obispo. The inland areas of San Luis Obispo County generally experience substantially higher summer temperatures and substantially lower winter temperatures than Edna Valley. This is because of the mountain barrier which runs along the San Luis Obispo County coastline, shields the inland areas from the moderating ocean influences. The boundaries for the viticultural area are essentially the same as those for Edna Valley except that the viticultural area boundaries omit the hilly and mountainous areas, above the 400-foot (122 m) contour line on the southwest side of the valley and above the 600-foot (183 m) contour line on the northeast side, where slopes are too steep and soil capabilities are not suitable for grape-growing.

=== Climate ===
In Edna Valley, killing frosts are rare which is not the case in other inland areas of the county which are denied the benefits of the ocean influence by the mountain barrier. There is a gap in this mountain barrier where the Los Osos Valley meets the ocean in the Morro Bay area, 15 miles (24 km) to the northwest of Edna Valley. Los Osos Valley serves as a wide mouthed funnel, providing an unobstructed sweep from the ocean into Edna Valley, bringing frequent morning fog during the summer months and winds in the afternoon. The pocket of hills and mountains surrounding Edna Valley captures the marine air, tempered by distance from the coastline, flowing in from Morro Bay through the Los Osos Valley, creating climatic conditions which differentiate Edna Valley from the surrounding areas. Although Los Osos Valley is also a distinguishable valley, its proximity to the ocean causes its climate to be colder with more fog and wind than Edna Valley. The floor of Edna Valley is approximately 120 to 300 feet (37–91 m) above sea level. The viticultural area projects into the surrounding uplands to the 600 feet (180 m) contour line of the Santa Lucia Mountains and to the 400 feet (120 m) contour line of the San Luis Range on the west. The elevations of the surrounding mountainous areas generally range between 1,000 to 2,400 feet (300–730 m) to the northwest, 600 to 1,600 feet (183–488 m) to the southeast, and 400 to 900 feet (122–274 m) to the south and west. After evaluating the petition and comments, ATF determined that due to the topographic and climatic features of Edna Valley, it is distinguishable from the surrounding areas.

=== Soil ===
Major soils within Edna Valley are generally sandy clay loam, clay loam or clay. They are generally neutral to moderately alkaline. Most soils are calcareous at some level of the surface soil or subsoil. Soils in the surrounding mountainous areas above the 400-to-600-foot (122–183 m) contour levels are shallower than in the valley and are of poor soil capability. Soils in Los Osos Valley are similar to those in Edna Valley but are generally heavier and of better capability.

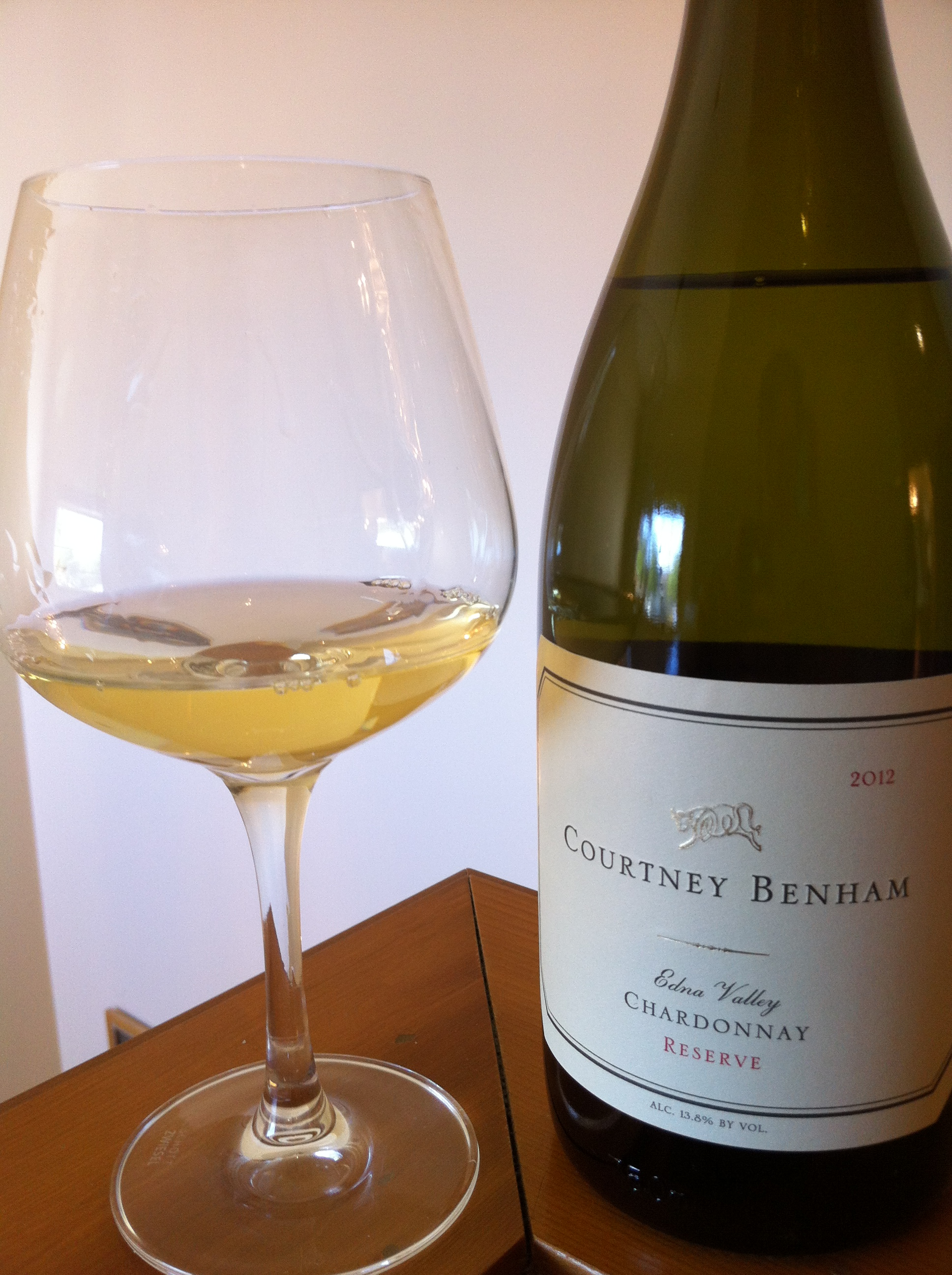
