= Rancho Nipomo =

Land grant in California

- Location within California
- 35.030°N 120.490°W
- Location: Nipomo, California

California Historical Landmark
- Reference no.: 1033

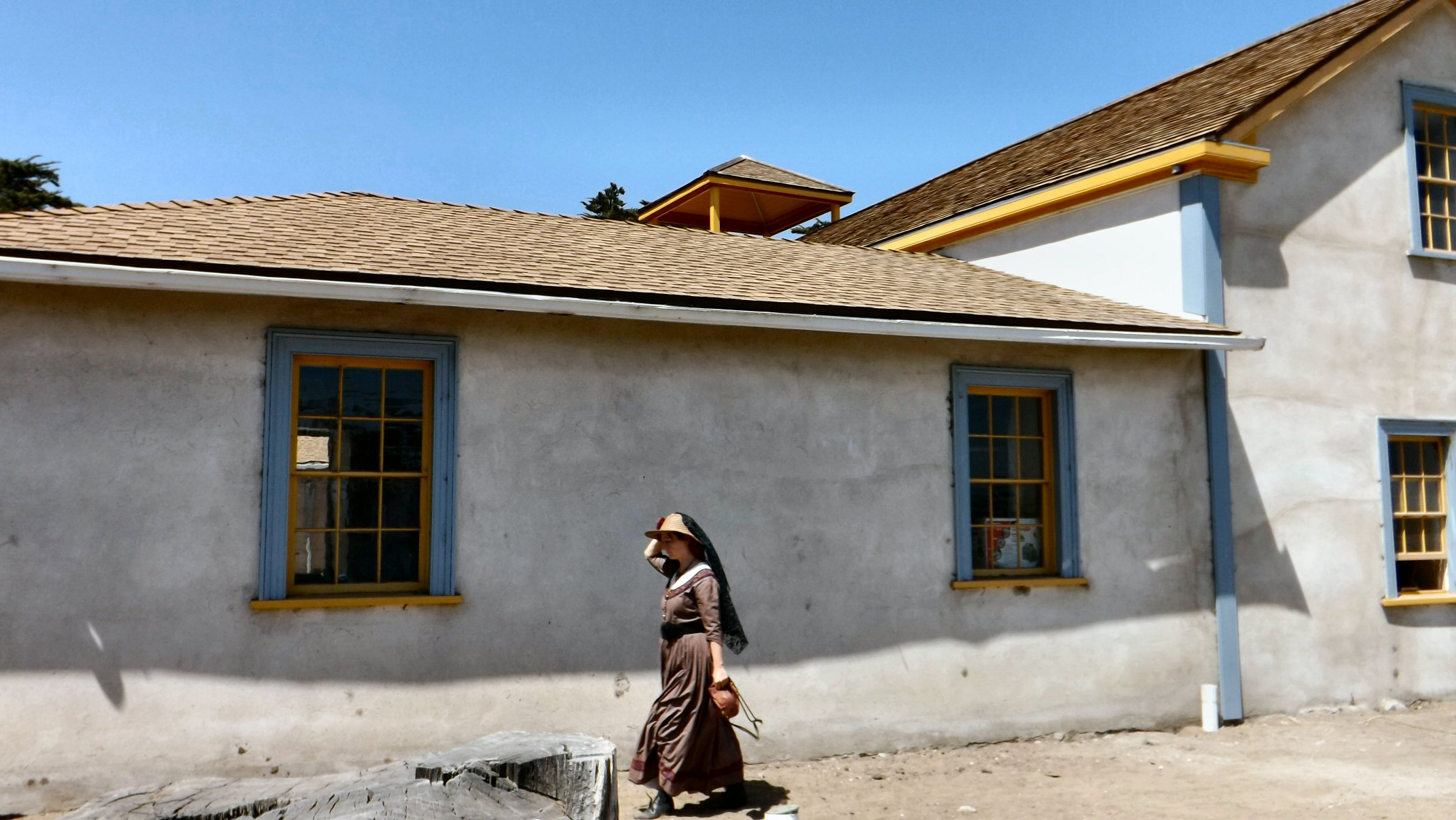
Rancho Nipomo Dana Adobe and re-enactor, 2012

Rancho Nipomo was a 37,888-acre (153.33 km^{2}) Mexican land grant in present day San Luis Obispo County, California given in 1837 by Governor Juan B. Alvarado to William Goodwin Dana. The grant encompassed present day Nipomo. The ranch is designated as a California Historical Landmark.

== History ==
William Goodwin Dana (May 5, 1797 – Feb 11, 1858) was born in Boston. Captain Dana went to sea early in life and arrived in Santa Barbara in 1825. He married Maria Josefa Carrillo, daughter of Carlos Antonio Carrillo in 1828. In 1836, Dana was alcalde of Santa Barbara. Dana was granted Rancho Nipomo in 1837. The family moved to Nipomo in 1839. Dana died at Nipomo in 1858.

With the cession of California to the United States following the Mexican–American War, the 1848 Treaty of Guadalupe Hidalgo provided that the land grants would be honored. As required by the Land Act of 1851, a claim for Rancho Nipomo was filed with the Public Land Commission in 1852, and the grant was patented to William G. Dana in 1868 (patent No. 351).

== Historic sites of the Rancho ==
- Dana Adobe. Adobe home started by Captain Dana in 1839.

== See also ==
- Ranchos of California
- List of Ranchos of California
