= Dana Adobe =

Historic house in California, United States

- Dana Adobe & Cultural Center
- U.S. National Register of Historic Places
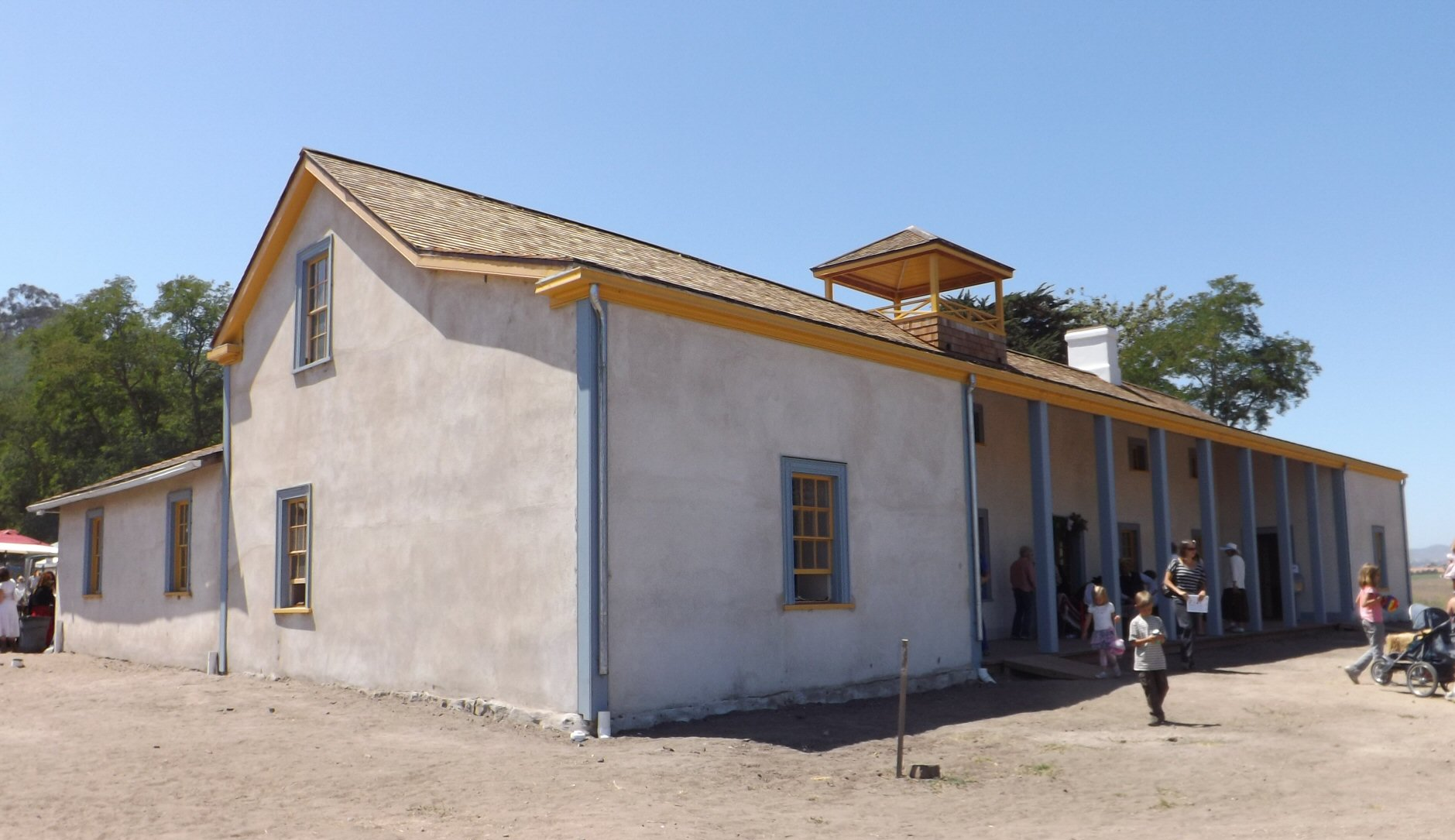
- Dana Adobe, 2012

- Location within California Location within the United States
- Location: 671 S Oakglen Ave. Nipomo, California
- Coordinates: 35°1′40″N 120°28′14″W
- Built: 1839
- Architect: Dana, William G.
- Architectural style: Adobe
- NRHP reference No.: 71000189
- Added to NRHP: May 6, 1971

The Dana Adobe & Cultural Center or "Casa de Dana" is a historic landmark in Nipomo, California. It was the home of Boston sea captain William Goodwin Dana, who in 1837 was granted the 37,888-acre (153.33 km^{2}) Rancho Nipomo in Southern California. Captain Dana hosted figures such as Henry Tefft and John C. Fremont in his Nipomo home, which also served as an important exchange point on California's first official mail route between Monterey and Los Angeles.

The building is listed on the National Register of Historic Places. The entire Rancho Nipomo is listed as a California Historical Landmark.

== Gallery ==
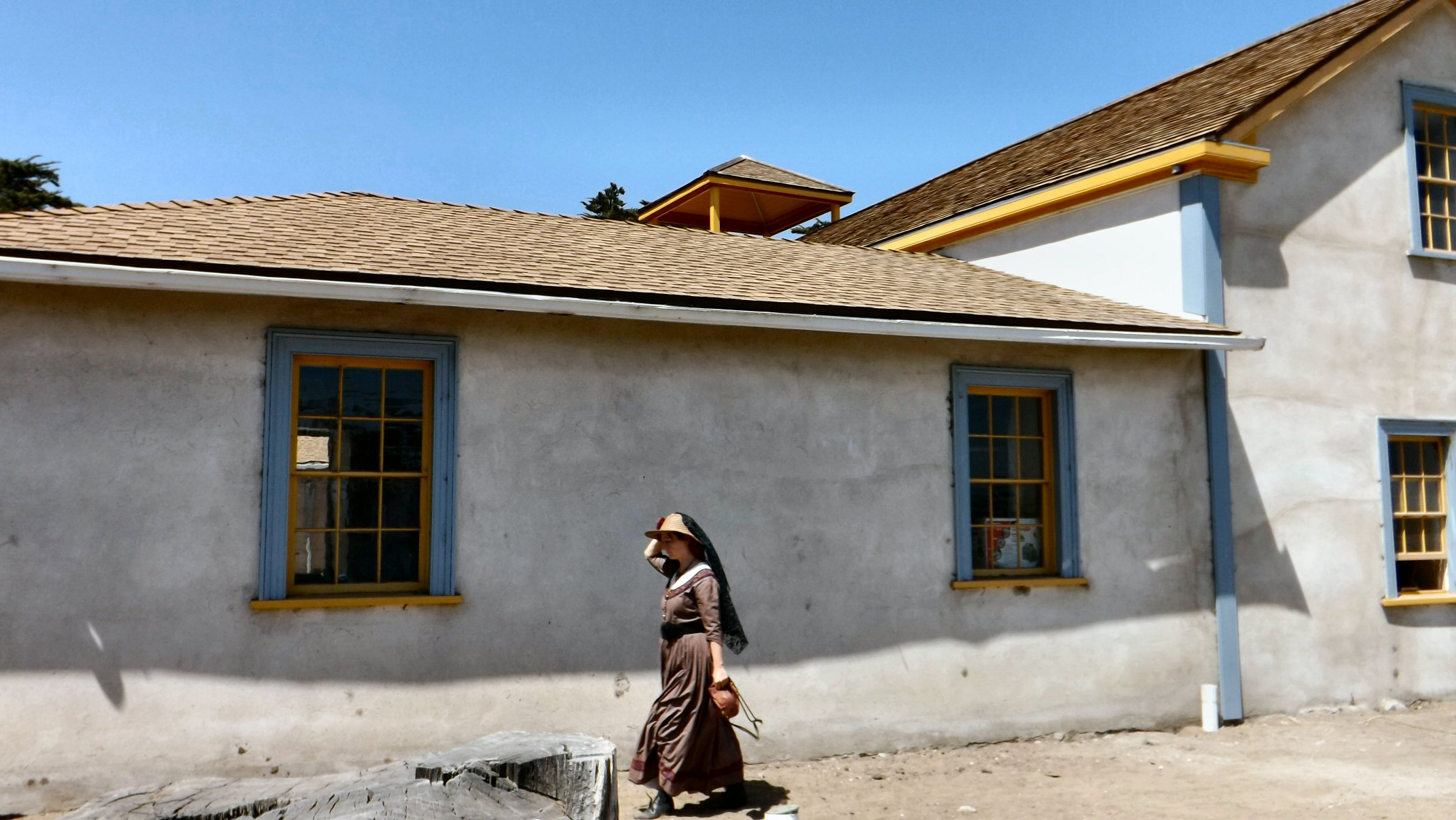
Dana Adobe and re-enactor, 2012

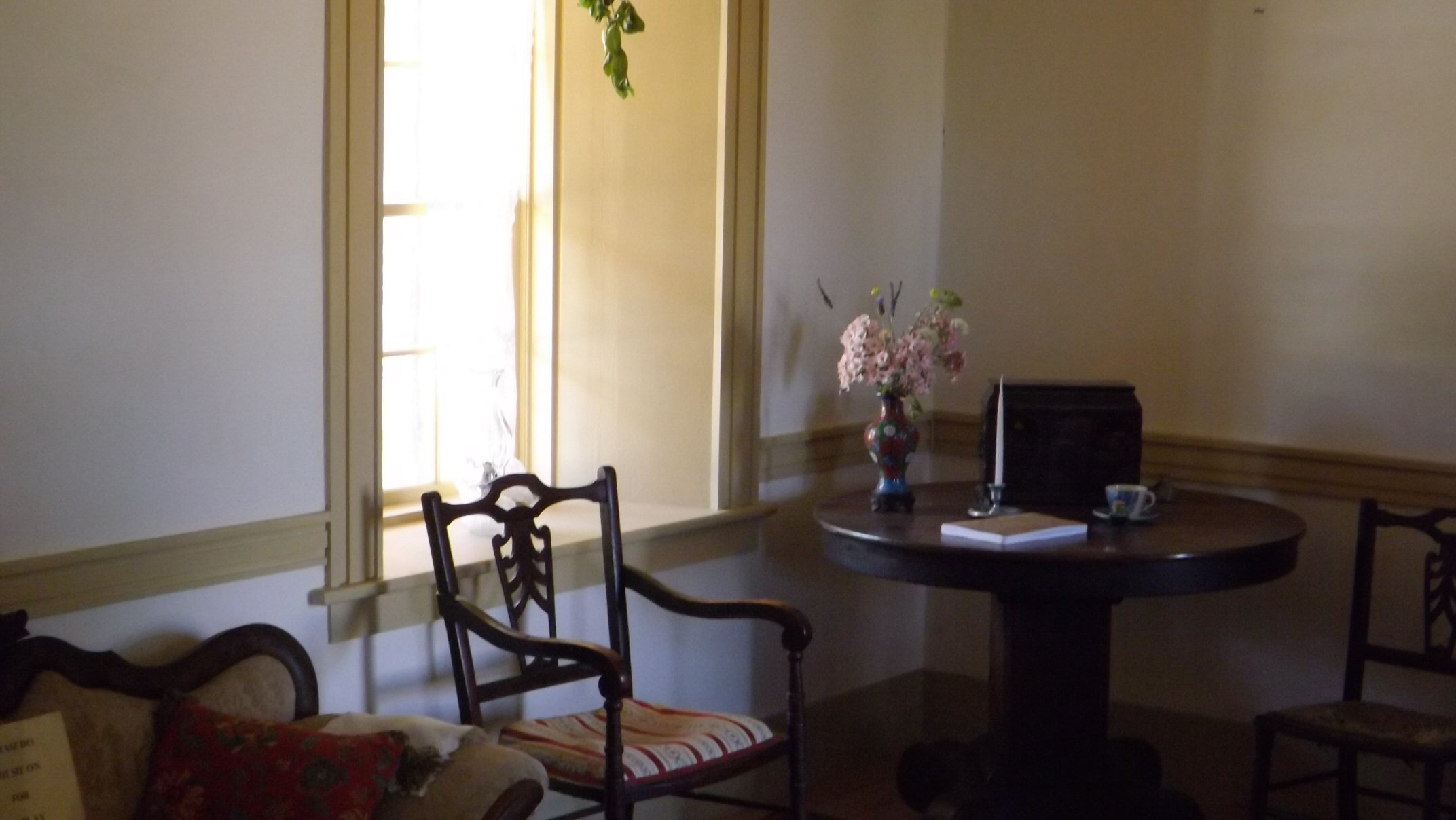
Dana Adobe, main salon

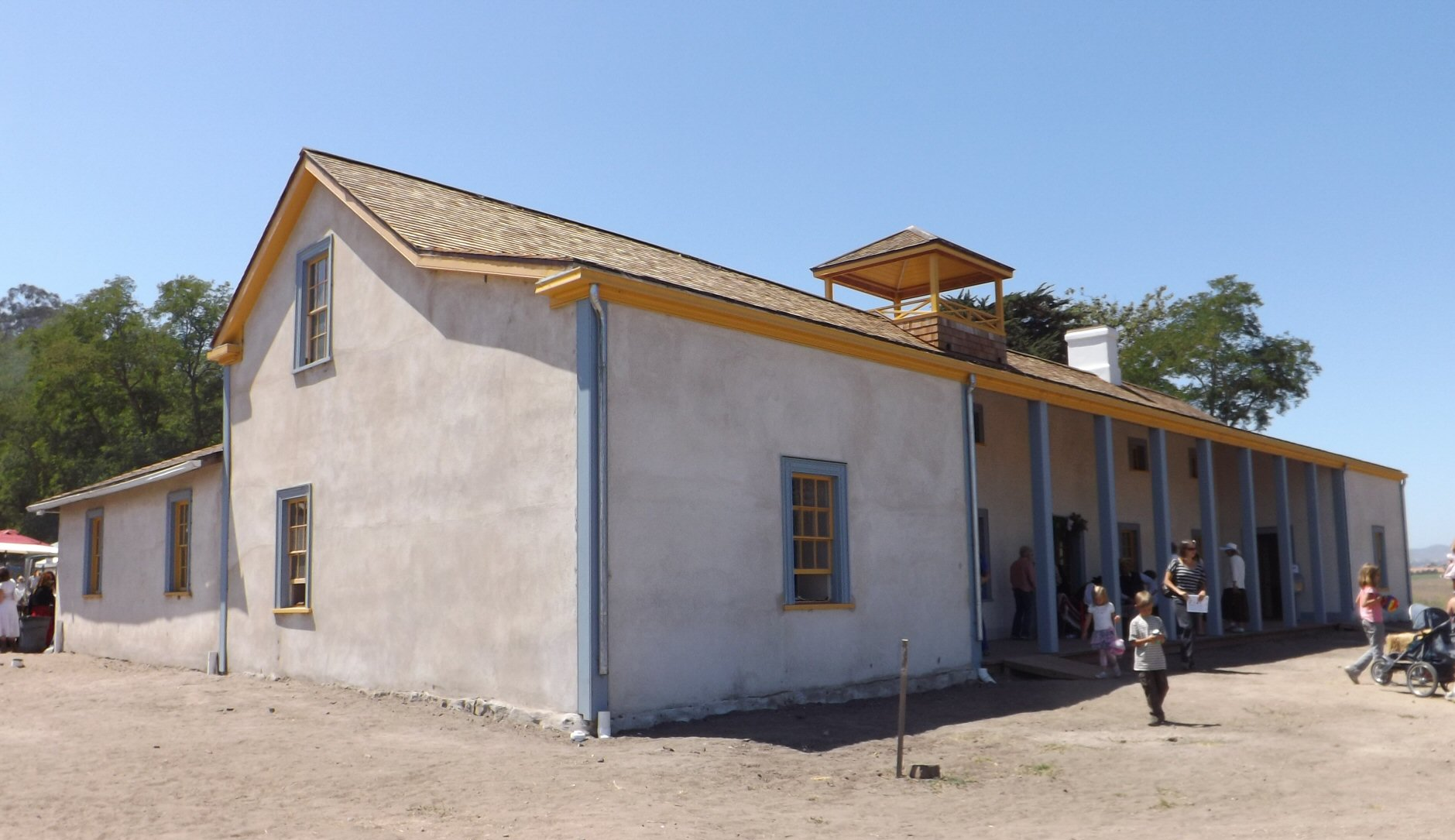
Another view of the Adobe
