= John Power =

John or Johnny Power may refer to:

== Arts and entertainment ==
- John Power (director) (1930–2016), Australian television and film director
- John Power (musician) (born 1967), English singer-songwriter and musician
- John Joseph Wardell Power (1881–1943; a.k.a. J. W. Power), Australian modernist artist

== Politics and government ==
- John Power (Irish MP), Member of Parliament for County Waterford and Dungarvon
- John Power (Patriot Parliament MP), Member of Irish Parliament for Charleville
- John Joseph Power (1867–1968), Australian politician
- John O'Connor Power (1846–1919), Irish Fenian
- Sir John Power, 1st Baronet (1874–1945), British Member of Parliament for Wimbledon
- Sir John Talbot Power, 3rd Baronet, Member of Parliament for County Wexford

== Sports ==
- John Power (cricketer) (1932–2005), Australian cricketer
- John Power (footballer), English football goalkeeper
- John Power (Carrickshock hurler) (born 1992), Irish hurler
- John Power (John Locke's hurler) (born 1966), former Irish sportsperson
- John A. Power (born 1976), rugby league player
- John T. Power (1883–1982), Irish hurler
- Johnny Power (1874–1958), Australian rules footballer

== Other ==
- John Power, a maker of Irish whiskey in the early 1800s, part of the family history of the Powers brand
- John Power, character in The Abduction Club
- John Power (hunger striker) (1900-1953), Irish revolutionary, hunger striker, and shopkeeper
- John Power (Master of Pembroke College, Cambridge) (1819–1880)
- John Power (Vicar-General for New York) (1792–1849), Irish-born American Catholic priest
- John Arthur Power, English physician, lecturer in medicine, and amateur entomologist
- John Carroll Power (1819–1894), American historian and custodian of the tomb of Abraham Lincoln
- John Hyacinth Power (1884–1964), director of the McGregor Museum in Kimberley, South Africa
- John V. Power (1918–1944), United States Marine Corps first lieutenant
- John Wyse Power (1859–1926), Irish journalist, newspaper editor and Irish nationalist

== See also ==
- Jack Power (disambiguation)
- Jackie Power (1916–1994), Irish hurler and Gaelic football player
- Johnny Powers (disambiguation)
- John Powers (disambiguation)
- Jack Powers (1827–1860), Irish-American gambler and gang leader
- Jon Powers (born 1978), American political activist
- Jonathon Power (born 1974), Canadian squash player
