= Camatta Creek =

Stream in San Luis Obispo County, California

Camatta Creek, originally Arroyo Camate, in 19th century Alta California, is a tributary stream of San Juan Creek, itself a tributary of the Estrella River, in San Luis Obispo County.

Camatta Creek heads at 35°23′01″N 120°18′37″W at an elevation of 2,800 feet (850 m) in the La Panza Range, trending north-northwest to its confluence with San Juan Creek, at an elevation of 1,125 feet (343 m), 4.5 miles (7.2 km) southeast of Shandon, California.
