= Jack Power =

Jack Power may refer to:

- Jack Power (Marvel Comics), a fictional character in Marvel Comics' universe
- Jack Power (Ulysses), fictional character in the novel Ulysses
- Jack Power (hurler) (1891–1977), Irish hurler
- Jack Power (politician) (1883–1925), Australian politician
- Jack Power (footballer) (1910–1988), Australian rules footballer

== See also ==
- Johnny Powers (disambiguation)
- John Power (disambiguation)
- John Powers (disambiguation)
- Jack Powers (1827–1860), Irish-American gambler and gang leader
- Jon Powers (born 1978), American political activist
