= John Powers =

John Powers may refer to:

== Academia and writing ==
- John Powers (academic) (born 1957), American-born Australian professor of Asian studies and Buddhism
- John Powers (film critic) (born 1951), American film critic, columnist, and writer
- John Powers (sports journalist) (born 1948), American journalist and author
- John Emory Powers (1837–1919), copywriter
- John J. Powers (food scientist) (1918–2014), professor emeritus of food science
- John R. Powers (1945–2013), American novelist and playwright

== Government, law, and politics ==
- John Powers (Canadian politician) (1894–1977), Ottawa alderman and controller in the mid 20th century
- John Powers (Illinois politician) (1852–1930), Chicago alderman in the late 19th and early 20th centuries
- John Powers (mayor), former mayor of Spokane, Washington
- John A. Powers (1922–1979), public affairs officer for NASA
- John C. Powers (1883–1914), Arizona deputy sheriff better known as Maricopa Slim
- John E. Powers (1910–1998), American politician in the Massachusetts Senate

== Sportspeople ==
=== Baseball ===
- John Powers (baseball) (1929–2001), baseball outfielder

=== Cricket ===
- John Powers (cricketer) (1868–1939), right-handed batsman from Leicestershire

=== Football ===
- John Powers (American football coach), college football player and coach
- John Powers (tight end) (1940–1978), American National Football League football player

== Others ==
- John Powers (musician), saxophonist, former member of American ska band Spring Heeled Jack
- John Holbrook Powers (1831–1918), Nebraska pioneer
- John James Powers (1912–1942), United States Navy officer and Medal of Honor recipient
- John Robert Powers (1892–1977), American actor and owner of a modeling agency

== See also ==
- Jack Power (disambiguation)
- Johnny Powers (disambiguation)
- John Power (disambiguation)
- Jack Powers (1827–1860), Irish-American gambler and gang leader
- Jon Powers, American political activist
