= Rancho San Juan Capistrano del Camote =

Land grant in California

Coordinates: 35°30′46.07″N 120°12′17.53″W

Rancho San Juan Capistrano del Camote, translated as (Saint John Capistrano of the sweet potato), Camote is probably an error in the documents, Camote would be Camate, which referred to the stream that ran through the grant and that in the 19th century was called the Camate according to Walter Murray [1858], or Comatti according to Annie L. Morrison [1917], now called Camatta Creek. The Rancho was a 44,284-acre Mexican land grant in the San Juan Valley, 13.7 miles southeast of Shandon, California, in present-day San Luis Obispo County, California.

== History ==
=== Rancho San Juan Capistrano del Camote ===
The "ten square leagues" of the rancho was granted July 11, 1846, by Governor Pio Pico to Tomás Herrera and Geronimo Quintana, both originally from Nuevo Mexico. Unlike most ranchos in Alta California Rancho San Juan Capistrano raised sheep, commonly raised in Nuevo Mexico. Alta California was dependent on the trade of woolen goods from Nuevo Mexico for horses and mules over the Old Spanish Trail until immigration from Nuevo Mexico brought herds of sheep beginning in the 1840s that began to change that. During the Mexican–American War, Tomás Herrera and José María Quintana raised a company of 30 New Mexican and Mexican cavalry that fought against the American forces at the November 16, 1846 Battle of Natividad. In 1847, the new owners had built two houses near the center of the tract, also planting wheat, barley and some fruit trees. At one time, they had 400 head of cattle on the rancho.

After Alta California was annexed to the United States and became the state of California, the grantees filed a claim with the Land Commission on August 14, 1852. That claim was rejected by the Commission December 26, 1854. Their title was declared invalid, because it was dated July 11, 1846, four days after the conquest of Monterey by the American Forces.

=== Rancho San Juan Capistrano Murders, May 12, 1858 ===
In May 1858, two French Basques, Bartolomé Baratie and M. Jose Borel, had come from Oakland to raise sheep on the rancho. On May 12, shortly after they settled in the ranch house on San Juan Creek, it was the subject of an infamous attack by eight of the bandit gang of Jack Powers and Pio Linares that resulted in the robbery and murders of the two men and the kidnapping of Andrea Baratie, the English/Chilean wife of Bartolomé. The gang's plan was to pin the blame for the crimes on the two Californio servants of the Frenchmen. They were to have been murdered where their bodies could not be found, however Pio Linares did not remain to oversee the execution of his plan but returned to San Luis Obispo. The two bandits, who were to carry out this plot spared the servants' lives, without telling their comrades. The result was that one of these servants went to the Rancho Huerhuero and informed Captain David P. Mallagh, of the murder. Mallagh immediately rode with one servant to San Luis Obispo bringing word of the crimes.

Following this crime, as they returned to San Luis Obispo, the gang also murdered Jack Gilkey, an American hunter at his home six miles away from the Rancho, on the Camate, near where the gang had stayed overnight before their attack on the Rancho San Juan the next day. He had sold some meat to the gang when they camped there and was killed to prevent him from telling authorities of the gangs presence in the area at the time of the murders.

The news of this attack; that for once left several witnesses, allowed Captain Mallagh, Walter Murray and others in the town to capture a gang member recognized by the servant, while other members of the gang fled the town. Murray and others in the town and surrounding ranchos organized a Vigilance Committee in San Luis Obispo County. Additional testimony was given by Andrea Baratie, wife of the murdered Bartolomé Baratie. She was witness to the crime including that of the murder of her husband then kidnapped. She was later let go instead of being killed as ordered by Linares, by another gang member, El Mesteño. The Vigilance Committee was able to destroy this gang that had been conducting numerous robberies and murders for many years in the county.

=== Rancho Claim Dismissed ===
Within two years of the murders, the Southern District court dismissed the claim of the grantees on August 8, 1860. The reason given for the failure of the grant case, was a failure to prosecute the case, but Walter Murray in his letters to the newspaper San Francisco Bulletin in defense of the actions of the Vigilance Committee, says the Frenchmen were there intending to purchase the grant:

"Old ranches were changing owners. Senor Pujol, a very worthy gentleman, a native, I believe, of old Spain, had purchased the San Simeon Rancho. A respectable Californian named Castro, from Santa Cruz County, had purchased part of the rancho of San Geronimo. The Messrs. Blackburn, of Santa Cruz, had purchased the Paso Robles Rancho, and quite a colony of Americans had settled in around them, and between them and Captain Mallagh's rancho, the Huer-Huero. Finally Borel and Baratie, two worthy Frenchmen from Alameda and Contra Costa Counties, were about to follow their example."

The killing of Baratie and Borel came at a critical time in the case, so close to its resolution in 1860. Given the dangers illustrated by the fate of the two Frenchmen, and that it was a remote, dangerous region, may have been the reason the case failed to be carried forward. No others were found after their deaths to lend money to the grantees or buy the land from them and carry it forward themselves in the Southern District court. It also may have been that the grant was made 4 days after the capture of Monterey, California and thus Pico's grant would have been invalid in the eyes of the U. S. government, and not worth pursuing.

=== San Juan Ranch ===
Following the 1860 decision, the rancho became public land and after being surveyed, it was sold at a price of 25 cents to $1.25 an acre. In 1874, Robert Flint, a Canadian, purchased the headquarters of the old Rancho San Juan, as well as acreage extending up San Juan Creek, and moved onto the San Juan Ranch. Flint grazed cattle and cultivated crops on its bottom-lands, and acquiring additional property. By the time of his death in 1892, he had acquired 58,175 acres. Flint's two sons inherited the property and in 1898 they sold it to a German immigrant, Henry Wreden. Wreden died in 1931 but his two sons operated the ranch until 1941, when the San Juan Ranch was divided equally among the six remaining Wreden heirs. Eventually the six tracts of land were sold and drifted into different ownership.

Nevertheless, part of the Rancho San Juan still remains as the San Juan Ranch, 13.7 miles southeast of Shandon, California. According to the San Juan Ranch website:

"In 1998, John and Brenda Stephenson purchased an 8,300 [acre] parcel of land that included the original San Juan Ranch headquarters, the original adobe homestead on San Juan Ranch, as well as a sweet spring used by Herrera to water his sheep in the mid 1800s. With their acquisition of this land, the Stephenson's retained rights to the name San Juan Ranch and its associated brand. Over the past seven years, with determined persistence, the Stephenson's have reassembled a substantial amount of the original San Juan Ranch. Through several more acquisitions, the Stephenson's have expanded their holdings by an additional 25,000 acres, bringing the present-day San Juan Ranch to over 44,000 acres. It is estimated that the Stephenson's have acquired three of the six tracts of land divided amongst the Wreden heirs in 1941. It is the Stephenson's desire to reassemble San Juan Ranch in its entirety and preserve the property's rich and historic livestock production."

Part of the old San Juan Ranch is now the French Camp Vineyards.

== See also ==
- Ranchos of California
- List of ranchos of California
- Jack Powers
- Pio Linares
