= William W. Twist =

William W. Twist (1820s-1861) was possibly a Canadian native, a volunteer soldier in the Mexican American War in California, Sheriff of Santa Barbara County and captain of California Militia in Los Angeles. He was killed in action as a captain of artillery in the Mexican Army.

== Early years in California ==
William W. Twist, described variously as a native of Nova Scotia or an American by birth, came to California from New York with Stevenson's Regiment during the Mexican American War. Part of the garrison of Santa Barbara at the end of that war, he remained there afterward and married a Mexican woman.

=== Sheriff of Santa Barbara County ===
In 1852 William W. Twist was appointed Sheriff of Santa Barbara County but was later replaced by Valentine W. Hearne. Sheriff Hearne's part of the lynching of two Santa Barbara Californios accused of murder in Los Angeles, in the later San Gabriel Affair was not pleasing to Dr. Nicolas A. Den (owner of the Dos Pueblos Rancho) and the de la Guerras (an influential Californio ranchero family in the county), who were his principal sureties, they withdrew from his bonds, thus forcing him to resign. On August 10 Charles Fernald was appointed in his place. In the November 1852, election W. W. Twist, was elected to the office.

==== Arroyo Burro Incident ====
John Vidal, a Justice of the Peace and former Associate Justice with Joaquin Carrillo, and like Twist a former member the Stevenson Regiment garrison at Santa Barbara, had rented a tract of land on the Arroyo Burro, a small creek which runs into the ocean, west of Santa Barbara. When the lease expired he claimed the land under the preemption laws as Government land. This was a common tactic among those in the American population who were opposed to the large land holdings being held by the Californios and the Americans who had intermarried among them. Unlike Northern California, the Californios were in the majority in Southern California and especially in Santa Barbara County, and controlled the local courts. Suit was brought and the title judged to belong to Dr. Den, from whom Vidal had rented the land. Sheriff Twist was ordered by the courts to remove Vidal and put Den in possession.

However Vidal had friends among the many gamblers in Santa Barbara including Jack Powers, which made dispossessing Vidal hazardous. People took sides depending on whether they favored the cause of the squatter and his gambler friends or the law-and-order party of la Guerra and the other Californio rancheros. Vidal's friends were gathered determined to hold the ground at all hazards. Vidal's partisans claimed that the presence of his friends at the Arroyo Burro was merely friendly and that no resistance to the law was contemplated.

Twist no doubt disbelieved that claim and raised a posse to execute the writ of ejectment. About 200 men were enlisted in the posse and set to gather at the Egerea House (used as the County court house) and 9 o'clock the next morning before departure. A small cannon kept on the plaza, was to be taken and used if necessary to knock down any fortifications. A surgeon, was employed to accompany the force.

Before the party had fully assembled that morning, Vidal and some of his companions came riding up. Two of his companions, one called "Little Mickey," and the other a short, swarthy man almost covered with a serape, lassoed the cannon and attempted to drag it away. Believing it was an attack, Twist fired at them, and firing immediately became general. Vidal was shot, and fell from his horse. The swarthy man in the serape rushed at Twist drawing a long knife from his belt and plunged it into him. Fortunately the knife was turned by a rib and the wound was not dangerous. Twist shot his assailant dead. A running fight then ensued, without any more casualties. The posse arrived at Arroyo Burro Canyon, to be met with a hail of bullets, and stopped short. After a brief negotiation, Powers informed the leader of the posse (Twist, injured, had stayed behind) that his gang would kill any man that passed a huge sycamore tree. Seeing that the bandits were dug in, well-armed, and determined, the posse backed away in defeat.

There was now serious talk of driving out the whole gang of "hounds," as Powers Gang were sometimes called. It was likely that the slightest incident would trigger a war between the Powers gang and the la Guerra party. An emissary was sent to the squatter fort the next day with a flag of truce, and he induced Powers and the others who were with him to submit to the legal authorities, and the affair ended. The next morning the reason for their submission appeared in the shape of a ship-of-war anchored in the offing, requested by the de la Guerra's and dispatched by California Governor John Bigler, having sailed from Monterey the day before to enforce order if necessary.

Vidal lived fourteen days before he died, without being able to speak, attended by the surgeon. Twist soon recovered. The land in dispute was afterwards judged to be public land.

==== Santa Barbara Guard ====
The Arroyo Burro Incident, had demonstrated the weakness of the civil authorities in the face of the Powers gang. Also raids of the Yokuts from the San Joaquin Valley were also causing anxiety to the inhabitants in the county. In January 1854, upon the election of Sheriff Twist as Caprtain and E. B. Williams, First Lieutenant. Adjutant General William C. Kibbe immediately forwarded arms to their new California Militia unit the Santa Barbara Guard. However, Jack Powers soon eliminated the danger of Twist and his new militia to his gang.

Shortly after the formation of the Guard, in February, 1854, Sheriff Twist was about to hang an Indian convicted of murder. A petition had been sent to Governor Bigler to have the sentence commuted to imprisonment for life and the reply was expected daily on the coastal steamer. On the day of execution no order for a mitigation of the sentence had been received, but when the Indian was about to be hanged, Jack Powers moved a stay of proceedings on the ground that the commutation of the sentence was probably on the steamer which was then overdue. The hanging was postponed on a vote of the spectators and the Governors order arrived on the steamer.

Twist was much blamed for allowing this procedure by his political backers and his sureties were withdrawn from his bonds, compelling Twist to resign his office as Sheriff. He was replaced as Sheriff by Doctor Brinkerhoff, the County Coroner, until the Court appointed Russel Heath as Sheriff, later elected Sheriff in September 1855. After resigning his office as Sheriff, Twist moved to Los Angeles, tendering his resignation as Captain of the Santa Barbara Guard to Governor Bigler on September 21, 1854, and the unit now leaderless was disbanded after being in existence for less than a year, thus eliminating it as a danger to the Jack Powers Gang.

== Los Angeles, Captain of Militia ==
Shortly after coming to live in Los Angeles, on February 3, 1855, Twist was elected Captain of the newly formed California Militia company, the Los Angeles Guard. It was raised to the fill the great need for help by the civil authorities in suppressing lawlessness, which was prevalent there at that time. In the latter part of February the company received their arms and accoutrements from the Adjutant General. Among their duties Horace Bell, says Twist used his company in a traditional local Californio ceremony when he:

... responded to the pious call of Father Anacleto, marched his company to the plaza, and with Uncle Sam's muskets riddled Judas as effectually, as well and as much to the satisfaction of all concerned as ever did the christian soldiers of Spain and Mexico. Twist ... won a crown immortal in being the first, and possibly the last man, who ever used the arms of the gringo government in so pious a way.

Twist was not reelected Captain of the Los Angeles Guard in 1856.

In early 1857, a petition presented to County Judge W. G. Dryden, requested that he appoint some suitable person to superintend the meeting to form a volunteer company of cavalry. Judge Dryden appointed W. W. Twist to supervise the meeting, and on March 26, 1857, the Southern Rifles was organized with Twist as its captain.

Shortly afterward his business affairs where in disarray and on June 6, 1857, El Clamor Publico reported he had to appeal to the courts:

In the District Court of the First Judicial District, In the matter of the Petition of William W. Twist, an Insolvent Debtor, John W. Shore, Wm. H. Shore", Asked to be discharged of his debts in the court of Judge Benjamin Hayes.

Perhaps because of his financial problems a notice to the effect that Twist had lost the confidence of his company but refused to resign and was removed as Captain of the Southern Rifles in a unanimous vote was published in the Los Angeles Star on September 5, 1857. On the 12th another announcement of a resolution was published from a regular meeting the Southern Rifles at the courthouse denying the previous notice and that "W. W. Twist has our entire confidence as an officer and soldier, and any attempt to displace any officer, except by a regular court martial, with charges preferred against him and an opportunity given him to make a defence, is, in our opinion, unmilitary, unsoldierlike, illegal, and void, and ought not to be countenanced by this company." The Southern Rifles were reorganized during the time of the Utah War under Twist. On February 13, 1858, the Los Angeles Star wrote:

Capt. Twist has returned from Sacramento, bringing with him arms and accoutrements for one hundred men, consisting of rifles, pistols, sabres, &c., &c.; and moreover, a six-pound brass gun - a very handsome piece. Should occasion require their service, the Southern Rifles will be well equipped for field service.

After reelection to Captain of the Southern Rifles, January 10, 1859, according to Horace Bell, Twist formed a company of adventurers and went to Sonora, Mexico, to involve himself in the Reform War, and there disappeared.

== Death in Mexico ==
However Bell was no longer in Los Angeles, but serving in the Union Army, when Twist's death on November 30, 1861, was announced in the Los Angeles Star, 8 February 1862:

From Mexico We have been permitted to take the following extracts from a private letter from Tepic, Mexico: "On tho 30th November last, the Government forces left Tepic in pursuit of tho famous bandit, Manuel Losada, and his followers. The Government forces were 4,000, those of Losada 3,500. — They met at the village of San Luis, about seven miles from Tepic. After a brief and bloody engagement, Losada with all his forces were utterly routed, and Losada killed by a man named Mendibil, who afterwards received a reward of $10,000. Among the killed upon the side of the Government forces was Capt. Wm. Twist, who had charge of and commanded the artillery, and was the first to open the ball. The loss of Losada's forces was 300 killed and many wounded; that upon the side of lhe Government, was not known at the time the letter was written from Tepic. The rout was complete, they being chased to the river Alica, where the Government forces united for further operations." Capt. Twist was formerly a resident of this city — and will long be remembered for his ardor and activity in our local military affairs.
