= Johnny Powers =

Johnny Powers may refer to:

- Johnny Powers (musician) (1938–2023), American rockabilly musician
- Johnny Powers (wrestler) (1943–2022), Canadian professional wrestler

== See also ==
- Jack Power (disambiguation)
- John Power (disambiguation)
- John Powers (disambiguation)
- Jack Powers (1827–1860), Irish-American gambler and gang leader
- Jon Powers (born 1978), American political activist
