= Elizabeth Owens =

Elizabeth Owens may refer to:

- Elizabeth Owens (actress) (1923–2014), stage actress
- Elizabeth Owens (schooner), a schooner, built in 1857
- Elizabeth Owens (cricketer) (born 1963), Irish women cricketer
