= Curt Gowdy =

American sportscaster (1919–2006)

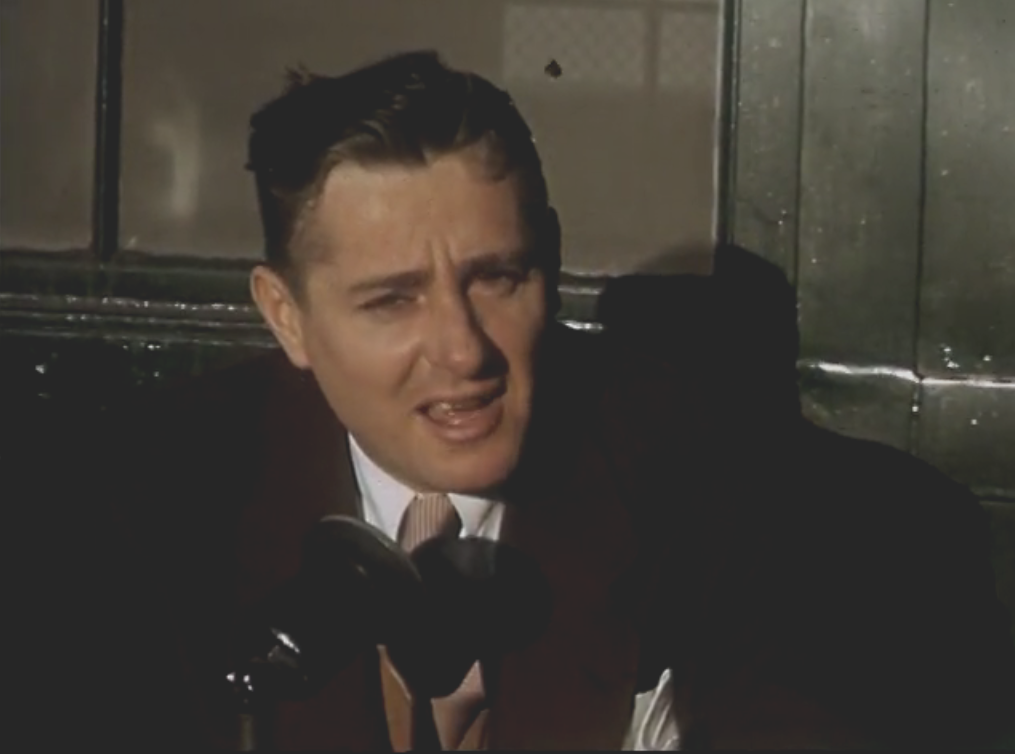
- Gowdy in the early 1950s.
- Born: Curtis Edward Gowdy; July 31, 1919; Green River, Wyoming, U.S.
- Died: February 20, 2006 (aged 86); Palm Beach, Florida, U.S.
- Resting place: Mount Auburn Cemetery; Cambridge, Massachusetts
- Education: University of Wyoming, 1942
- Occupation: Sportscaster
- Years active: 1945-1985, 1987-1988
- Spouse: Jerre Dawkins (m. 1949–2006; his death)
- Children: 2 sons, 1 daughter
- Awards: Ford C. Frick Award; Boston Red Sox Hall of Fame; Rose Bowl Hall of Fame
- Military career
- Allegiance: United States
- Branch: U.S. Army Air Forces
- Service years: 1942–1943

Curtis Edward Gowdy (July 31, 1919 – February 20, 2006) was an American sportscaster. He called Boston Red Sox games on radio and TV for 15 years, and then covered many nationally televised sporting events, primarily for NBC Sports and ABC Sports in the 1960s and 1970s. He coined the nickname "The Granddaddy of Them All" for the Rose Bowl Game, taking the moniker from Cheyenne Frontier Days in his native Wyoming.

== Early years ==
The son of Ruth and Edward "Jack" Gowdy (Curt's father was a manager and dispatcher for the Union Pacific railroad), Curtis Edward (Curt) Gowdy was born in Green River, Wyoming, and moved to Cheyenne at age six. As a high school basketball player in the 1930s, he led the state in scoring. He also showed an early interest in journalism, serving as sports editor of his high school newspaper. He enrolled at the University of Wyoming in Laramie, where he was a 5 ft 9 in (175 cm) starter on the basketball team and played varsity tennis, lettering three years in both sports for the Cowboys. He was also a member of the Alpha Tau Omega fraternity.

After graduating in 1942 with a degree in business statistics, he entered the army, where he was commissioned as a Second Lieutenant. Gowdy planned to become a fighter pilot, but a ruptured disk in his spine from a previous sports injury cut short his military service in the Air Force, leading to a medical discharge in 1943. Gowdy would continue to suffer from persistent back problems for many years.

In November 1943, recovering from back surgery, Gowdy made his broadcasting debut in Cheyenne calling a "six-man" high school football game from atop a wooden grocery crate in subzero weather, with about 15 people in attendance. He found he had a knack for broadcasting, and worked at the small KFBC radio station and at the Wyoming Eagle newspaper as a sportswriter (and later sports editor). After several years in Cheyenne, he accepted an offer from CBS's KOMA radio in Oklahoma City in September 1945. He was hired primarily to broadcast OU college football (then coached by new-hire Bud Wilkinson) and OSU college basketball games (then coached by Hank Iba). In 1947–1948, in addition to calling football and basketball on KOMA, Gowdy was also broadcasting the baseball games of the Texas League Oklahoma City Indians, on station KOCY. When Gowdy announced in early 1949 that he was leaving Oklahoma to work in New York, his replacement was fellow Oklahoma City sportscaster Bob Murphy.

Gowdy's distinctive play-by-play style during his broadcasts of minor league baseball, college football, and college basketball in Oklahoma City earned him a national audition and then an opportunity with the New York Yankees in 1949, working with (and learning from) Mel Allen for two seasons.

== Family background ==
In June 1949, Curt married Geraldine "Jerre" Dawkins. She had a bachelor's degree in education from Central State College, and was studying for a master's degree in Radio Speech at the University of Oklahoma when they became engaged. Curt and Jerre had three children: Cheryl Ann Gowdy, Curtis Edward Gowdy Jr. (who worked as a sports producer for ABC and SNY), and Trevor Gowdy. Curt's nickname was affectionately The Cowboy.

== Boston Red Sox ==
Gowdy began his Major League Baseball broadcasting career working as the No. 2 announcer to Mel Allen for Yankees games on radio and television in 1949–50. There, he succeeded Russ Hodges, who departed to become the New York Giants' lead announcer when the Yankees and Giants decided to broadcast a full slate of 154 games, instead of sharing the same radio network and announcers for the 77 home games of each team that had been broadcast (no away games of either team were broadcast). Two years later, the Red Sox and the Boston Braves followed a similar path, with each team opting for its own networks and announcers to allow each team to broadcast their full schedules, home and away. Jim Britt, who had called home games of both teams, decided to stay with the Braves, opening the top spot on the Red Sox broadcast team.

In April 1951 at the age of 31, Gowdy began his tenure as the lead announcer for the Red Sox. For the next 15 years, he called the exploits of generally mediocre Red Sox teams on WHDH radio and on three Boston TV stations: WBZ-TV, WHDH-TV, and WNAC-TV (WBZ and WNAC split the Red Sox TV schedule from 1948 through 1955; WBZ alone carried the Red Sox from 1955 through 1957; and WHDH took over in 1958). During that time, Gowdy partnered with two future baseball broadcasting legends: Bob Murphy and Ned Martin. Chronic back pain caused Gowdy to miss the entire 1957 season. He also did nightly sports reports on WHDH radio when his schedule permitted. Gowdy was also the narrator of several Red Sox highlight films during his tenure in Boston which described the season in depth along with its key moments; this would lead to him eventually narrating World Series highlight films during his time with NBC (1968–1974, '77).

Gowdy called Ted Williams' final at-bat where he hit a home run into the bullpen in right-center field off Jack Fisher of Baltimore. He also called Tony Conigliaro's home run in his first at-bat at Fenway Park on April 17, 1964, at the age of 19.

He left WHDH after the 1965 season for NBC Sports, where for the next ten years he called the national baseball telecasts of the Saturday afternoon Game of the Week and Monday Night Baseball during the regular season (and the All-Star Game in July), and the postseason playoffs and World Series in October.

== National broadcaster ==
=== Early ABC Sports career ===
Following a stint calling NBA games for NBC from 1955 to 1960, Gowdy moved to ABC, where he teamed with Paul Christman to cover college football in 1960 and 1961 and the American Football League from 1962 to 1964. On February 27, 1966, Gowdy called his final major event for ABC, the 1966 Daytona 500 which aired as part of the long running sports anthology series Wide World of Sports.

=== NBC Sports ===
In the fall of 1965, he moved full-time to NBC, with whom he would be employed for over a decade. Gowdy was the lead play-by-play announcer for the network for both the American Football League (AFC from 1970 on) and Major League Baseball, but Gowdy also covered a wide range of sports, earning him the nickname of the "broadcaster of everything." He called the 1969 Final Four in Louisville and during the closest played game of the tournament, the semi-final between UCLA and Drake, he confused Drake with Duke, mistakenly calling the Drake Bulldogs by the wrong name no fewer than three times. It was Drake that came within three points of upsetting the mighty Bruins.

Besides Christman, who followed him from ABC to NBC, Gowdy's other football broadcast partners were Kyle Rote, Al DeRogatis, Don Meredith, John Brodie, and Merlin Olsen. His broadcast partners for baseball included Pee Wee Reese, Tony Kubek, Sandy Koufax, and Joe Garagiola. He also had many different partners for basketball, including Tommy Hawkins and Billy Packer. DeRogatis was also Gowdy's partner for college football games.

==== Departure from NBC's baseball telecasts ====
After the 1975 World Series, he was removed from NBC's baseball telecasts, when sponsor Chrysler insisted on having Joe Garagiola, who was their spokesman in many commercials, be the lead play-by-play voice. While Gowdy was on hand in the press box for Carlton Fisk's home run in Game 6 of the 1975 Series, the calls were made by two of Gowdy's Red Sox successors, Dick Stockton on TV and Ned Martin on radio. Gowdy was Martin's color man on that home run. Gowdy returned to the NBC World Series broadcast in 1978 as "Host" with Garagiola handling play-by-play and Kubek and Tom Seaver providing color. After umpire Frank Pulli decided not to call interference on a significant base-running play involving Reggie Jackson in Game 4 of the 1978 Series, Gowdy interviewed Pulli on NBC shortly before Game 5 began.

=== Later work ===
He continued as NBC's lead NFL announcer through the 1978 season, with his final broadcast being Super Bowl XIII between Pittsburgh and Dallas. With NBC anxious to promote Dick Enberg to the lead NFL position, NBC orchestrated a “trade” with CBS for the up-and-coming Don Criqui, who enjoyed a long career with NBC. After switching networks, Gowdy called NFL games on CBS for two seasons with former Kansas City Chiefs head coach Hank Stram, and also did baseball on radio. He returned to ABC to call regional college football in 1982 and 1983. In 1987, Gowdy was the radio voice of the New England Patriots.

In 1976, when Gowdy otherwise still worked for NBC, he was loaned to ABC to work on their Summer Olympics coverage in Montreal. Gowdy called swimming with Donna de Varona and basketball with Bill Russell.

=== Notable moments called by Gowdy ===
Curt Gowdy was present for some of American sports' storied moments, including Ted Williams' home run in his final at-bat in 1960, Super Bowl I, the AFL's "Heidi" game of 1968, and (after the 1968 pro football season) the third AFL-NFL World Championship game (Super Bowl III) in which Joe Namath and the New York Jets defeated the NFL champion Baltimore Colts. Two years later in Super Bowl V, Gowdy called the dramatic 16–13 Colts' win over Dallas. The next year in 1971, Gowdy's telecast on NBC caused many a Christmas dinner to be delayed as the country locked in that Christmas Day to the longest game in pro football history when the Miami Dolphins defeated the Kansas City Chiefs 27–24 in the final game at Kansas City's Municipal Stadium. He also covered Franco Harris' "Immaculate Reception" of 1972, Clarence Davis' miraculous catch in a "sea of hands" from Oakland Raiders quarterback Ken Stabler, to defeat the Miami Dolphins in the final seconds of a legendary 1974 AFC playoff game, and Hank Aaron's 715th home run in 1974.

Gowdy endeared himself to long-suffering American Football League fans when it was learned that in an off-air break towards the end of a game, he asked rhetorically: "“I want to see Tex Maule, that —————.”", a reference to the Sports Illustrated writer who for years had denigrated the AFL. On-air, in contrast to some of his contemporary announcers of NFL games, he avoided their hyperbole and transparent adulation of players, and gave steady, nonpartisan, but colorful descriptions of AFL games. Gowdy was also known for the occasional malapropism, including a consoling comment just after the Red Sox lost the 1975 World Series: "Their future is ahead of them!"

=== Notable assignments ===
Over the course of a career that stretched into the 1980s, Gowdy covered pro football (both the AFL and NFL), Major League Baseball, college football, and college basketball. He was involved in the broadcast of 13 World Series, 16 baseball All-Star Games, 9 Super Bowls, 14 Rose Bowls, 8 Olympic Games and 24 NCAA Final Fours. He also hosted the long-running outdoors show The American Sportsman on ABC.

Gowdy called all the Olympic Games televised by ABC from 1964 to 1988 with Roone Arledge's sports department at ABC.

In the mid-1970s, Gowdy was host and producer of The Way It Was, for PBS, and in later years provided historic commentary for Inside the NFL, on HBO.

=== Relationship with Roone Arledge ===
Gowdy was also close friends with Arledge, and acknowledged that he gives Arledge all the credit for making ABC what it is today, including the creation of the network's sports department, and the innovations for televising sporting events that made the sports departments at NBC and CBS jealous. The two were the creators, and first producers for the Wide World of Sports television show.

In 1970, he was coveted by ABC's Arledge for the new Monday Night Football, but Gowdy was bound by his contract to NBC Sports (although he continued with Grits Gresham of Natchitoches, Louisiana, to host The American Sportsman on ABC).

=== Commentating style ===
Gowdy was said to have a warm, slightly gravelly voice and an unforced, easy style that set him apart from his peers. (Author John Updike once described him as sounding "like everybody's brother-in-law.") Unlike many well-known sportscasters, Gowdy never developed catchphrases or signature calls, but merely described the action in a straightforward manner. Examples:

Jack Fisher into his windup, here's the pitch...Williams swings, and there's a long drive to deep right...it could be...it could be...IT IS! A home run for Ted Williams, in his last time at bat in the major leagues!

— Calling Williams' final career at-bat on September 28, 1960.

The ball's hit deep... deep...it is gone! He did it! He did it! Henry Aaron... is the all-time home run... leader now!

— Calling Aaron's 715th career home run on April 8, 1974.

=== Retirement ===
Gowdy's career wound down after The American Sportsman was canceled in 1985.

He briefly came out of retirement in 1987 to call the New England Patriots on radio, and in 1988 he returned to NBC to call September NFL games with Merlin Olsen and old partner Al DeRogatis, while Olsen's regular partner Dick Enberg was covering the Summer Olympics in Seoul.

In May 2003, a few months shy of his 84th birthday, Gowdy called a Red Sox–Yankees game from Fenway Park, as part of the ESPN Major League Baseball "Living Legends" series. At the end of the broadcast, he thought he could have done better. ESPN's Chris Berman said, "We'll give you another chance." Gowdy replied, "Call me back."

Gowdy also co-hosted the Drum Corps International Championships on PBS from 1989 to 1993 with Steve Rondinaro.

== Other appearances ==
=== Drum Corps International ===
Curt Gowdy served as a prominent broadcast commentator for Drum Corps International (DCI) in the late 1980s through the early 1990s. Working alongside DCI broadcasters like Steve Rondinaro, Gowdy brought his signature professional, play-by-play style to championship coverage.

=== Film cameos ===
Gowdy made cameo appearances in the movies The Naked Gun (1988) and Summer Catch (2001), and his voice can be heard in Heaven Can Wait (1978) and BASEketball (1998).

- Heaven Can Wait (1978) – TV Commentator
- The Naked Gun: From the Files of Police Squad! (1988) – The Baseball Announcer #5
- An American Summer (1990) – Himself
- BASEketball (1998) – World Series Announcer (voice)
- Summer Catch (2001) – Himself

=== Television and radio commercials ===
In the 1950s and '60s, 'Curt Gowdy did pre-recorded and live commercials for Red Sox sponsor Narragansett Beer. His voice speaking the famous line: "Hi Neighbor, have a 'Gansett" was known to Red Sox fans everywhere. In the 1980s, Gowdy voiced a series of beer commercials for Genesee. Essentially, these ads had an outdoor enthusiast theme, with Curt's tag line being "Genesee – the great outdoors in a glass."

== Author ==
Gowdy, who also did some sportswriting during his early broadcasting days, wrote two books: Cowboy at the Mike (1966), with Al Hirshberg, and Seasons to Remember: The Way It Was in American Sports, 1945–1960 (1993), with John Powers. He also wrote the foreword for the 2000 book The Golden Boy, authored by Dr. George I. Martin, in which Gowdy described the subject of the book, Jackie Jensen, as possibly the best athlete he had ever covered.

== Radio stations ==
In 1963, Gowdy purchased radio stations WCCM and WCCM-FM in Lawrence, Massachusetts, later changing the FM station's call letters to WCGY to somewhat match his name. Gowdy also owned several radio stations in Wyoming, including KOWB and KCGY in Laramie. He sold his broadcast interests in Massachusetts in 1994 and his Wyoming stations in 2002. He also owned WEAT and WEAT-FM in West Palm Beach, Florida, and WBBX in New Hampshire. The year away from broadcasting the Red Sox in 1957 awakened him to the fact that he might need an alternate way of making a living, leading to his interest in station ownership.

== Awards ==
In 1970, Gowdy became the first sportscaster to receive the George Foster Peabody Award. The National Sportscasters and Sportswriters Association named Gowdy as Massachusetts Sportscaster of the Year five times (1959–1963) and National Sportscaster of the Year twice (1966, 1969), and inducted him into its Hall of Fame in 1981. In 1985, he was inducted into the American Sportscasters Association Hall of Fame along with his onetime Yankees partner Mel Allen and Chicago legend Jack Brickhouse. He served as the organization's vice president and was a member of its board of directors. In addition, he was given the Ford C. Frick Award from the National Baseball Hall of Fame in 1984, the Pete Rozelle Award from the Pro Football Hall of Fame in 1993 and a lifetime achievement Emmy in 1992, and was selected to the Boston Red Sox Hall of Fame in 2000. Gowdy was president of the Naismith Memorial Basketball Hall of Fame for several years, and that institution's Curt Gowdy Media Award is presented annually to outstanding basketball writers and broadcasters; he was one of its first two recipients.

Curt Gowdy's 23 Halls of Fame honors/inductions:

1. Conservation Hall of Fame International – April 16, 1973
2. Golden Plate Award of the American Academy of Achievement – 1973
3. International Fishing Hall of Fame – 1981
4. National Sportscasters & Sportswriters Association Hall of Fame – 1981
5. Sportswriters & Broadcasters Hall of Fame – 1984
6. Ford C. Frick Award recipient, awarded by the National Baseball Hall of Fame – 1984
7. American Sportscasters Association Hall of Fame – 1985
8. Naismith Memorial Basketball Hall of Fame – 1990, Curt Gowdy Media Award recipient
9. Museum of Broadcasting Hall of Fame – 1990
10. Gold Medal Hall of Fame Award from the National Academy of Television Arts and Sciences in New England
11. Oklahoma Sports Hall of Fame – 1992
12. Pro Football Hall of Fame – 1993, Pete Rozelle Radio-Television Award recipient
13. Oklahoma Association of Broadcasters Hall of Fame – 1994
14. American Football League Hall of Fame – 1995
15. University of Wyoming Athletics Hall of Fame – September 25, 1998
16. Florida Sports Hall of Fame – 1999
17. Boston Red Sox Hall of Fame – 2000
18. Wyoming Sports Hall of Fame – 2001
19. International Game Fish Association (IGFA) Fishing Hall of Fame – 2003
20. Wyoming Association of Broadcasters Hall of Fame – 2003
21. Wyoming Outdoor Hall of Fame – 2004
22. National Freshwater Fishing Hall of Fame – 2005
23. Rose Bowl Hall of Fame – 2005 inductee (January 3, 2006)

== Curt Gowdy State Park ==
A state park in Wyoming, opened in 1971, was officially named for Gowdy on March 27, 1972, one of numerous honors bestowed on the native son from the state of Wyoming on "Curt Gowdy Day." The 11,000 acres (45 km^{2}) Curt Gowdy State Park is halfway between his high school hometown of Cheyenne and his college town of Laramie. Additional land was acquired by the state for the park in 2006. "It has two beautiful lakes, hiking trails, camping, boating, fishing, and beauty," said Gowdy. "It has everything I love. What greater honor can a man receive?"

Gowdy was proud of his Wyoming heritage and loved the outdoors, and said that he was "born with a fly-rod in one hand," and that the sports microphone came a little later. In 2002, he recalled that his father, Edward Curtis Gowdy, who had taught him to hunt and fish, was the best fly-fisherman in the state. "We had free access to prime-time fishing and hunting. The outdoors was a way of life for me. I should have paid them to host The American Sportsman."

On July 31, 2013, on the 94th anniversary of his birth, the state park opened an interpretive center with exhibits about the history of the park and Gowdy's work to preserve area natural resources. Milward Simpson, director of the Wyoming State Parks and Cultural Resources Department, describes the 7,400-square foot building, which also includes meeting rooms and a lobby, as a monument to the "fantastic legacy" left by Gowdy.

== Death ==
Gowdy died at the age of 86 at his winter home in Palm Beach, Florida, after an extended battle with leukemia. His funeral procession circled Fenway Park and he was interred at Mount Auburn Cemetery in Cambridge, Massachusetts. Pallbearers included his former NBC baseball broadcast partner and New York Yankees shortstop Tony Kubek.

== Curt Gowdy Post Office Building ==
On October 12, 2006, the United States Postal Service building in Green River, Wyoming, was officially designated as the "Curt Gowdy Post Office Building," honoring the place of Gowdy's birth. The legislation required for the USPS name change was introduced by Wyoming House Representative Barbara Cubin.

| Preceded by Ray Scott and Vin Scully | World Series network television play-by-play announcer (with Harry Caray in 1964 and Joe Garagiola in 1975); 1964; 1966–1975 | Succeeded by Joe Garagiola |
| Preceded by Chris Schenkel | American television prime time anchor, Winter Olympic Games; 1972 | Succeeded by Jim McKay |
| Preceded by First | Super Bowl television play-by-play announce (AFC package carrier); 1966–1978 | Succeeded by Dick Enberg |
| Preceded by Bob Wolff | Lead play-by-play announcer, Major League Baseball on NBC; 1966–1975 (alternated with Joe Garagiola from 1974 to 1975) | Succeeded by Joe Garagiola |
| Preceded by Chris Schenkel | Lead play-by-play announcer, Major League Baseball Game of the Week; 1966–1975 | Succeeded by Joe Garagiola |
