= Jose Antonio Garcia (Californio bandit) =

Jose Antonio Garcia (c. 1836–1858) was a Californio bandit, born in Santa Barbara, Alta California, Mexico. He was suspected by the San Luis Obispo Vigilance Committee of being part of the gang of Pio Linares, and he was hanged after making a confession exposing other members and the leadership of the gang as the participants in an 1857 robbery and murder of two French Basque cattlemen.

== Life ==
Jose Antonio Garcia was born in Santa Barbara and was 22 years old in 1858 when the few Americanos and other European immigrants living in San Luis Obispo began to suspect Pio Linares and his associates, including Garcia of being part of a gang of robbers and murderers plaguing the travelers through the county along the El Camino Real.

During the search for the gang of bandits that had and murdered three persons and kidnapped another, at the Rancho San Juan Capistrano del Camate, Jose Antonio Garcia was found at the Rancho San Julian and arrested on suspicion by a San Luis Obispo vigilante posse. He was eventually talked into making a confession.

In his confession, Garcia admitted he was involved in the 1857 murders of the two Basque cattlemen and the theft of their horses and implicated Pio Linares and El Huero Rafael of doing the killings and also Jack Powers and Nieves Robles, known as “Eduriquez”, as participants in the crime.

His confession naming Jack Powers set off a police manhunt for Powers in San Francisco at the request of the San Luis Obispo Vigilance Committee. With the help of friends in the city Jack Powers escaped the city on a ship. However, not knowing which ship Powers had taken, the San Luis Obispo Vigilantes searched the coastal steamer for Powers without success. Then the vigilantes decided to hang Garcia. After making a confession to a priest, Garcia was hung on Tuesday June 8, 1858 in San Luis Obispo, for his part in the Nacimiento Murders of the two Basque cattle buyers in late 1857.

== Books ==
- Angel, Myron; History of San Luis Obispo County, California; with illustrations and biographical sketches of its prominent men and pioneers, Thompson & West, Oakland, 1883
