= KCGY =

Radio station in Laramie, Wyoming

- Laramie, Wyoming; United States
- Broadcast area: Cheyenne/Laramie area
- Frequency: 95.1 MHz
- Branding: Y-95 Country

Programming
- Format: Country music
- Affiliations: Compass Media Networks

Ownership
- Owner: Townsquare Media; (Townsquare License, LLC)
- Sister stations: KARS-FM, KOWB

History
- First air date: 1983
- Call sign meaning: Curt Gowdy (former owner)

Technical information
- Licensing authority: FCC
- Facility ID: 14753
- Class: C
- ERP: 100,000 watts
- HAAT: 326 meters (1,070 ft)
- Transmitter coordinates: 41°18′34″N 105°27′11″W

Links
- Public license information: Public file; LMS
- Webcast: Listen live
- Website: y95country.com

KCGY (95.1 FM) is a radio station broadcasting a country music format. Licensed to Laramie, Wyoming, United States, the station serves Laramie and nearby Cheyenne. The station is currently owned by Townsquare Media and features programming from Westwood One.

The station is the FM flagship for Wyoming Cowboys football and basketball; games are simulcast with sister station KOWB.

KCGY FM was originally put on the air by Curt Gowdy. The station's call sign, KCGY, was created using his initials (C. G.).

== History ==
Gowdy, a Green River native and University of Wyoming alumnus, purchased the existing Laramie AM station, KOWB (1290 AM), in 1966.

KCGY first signed on in 1978. The station and KOWB were eventually sold by Gowdy's company in 1992. Eventually the stations were sold to what was then Clear Channel Communications, the precursor to iHeartMedia.

In January 2021, Townsquare Media consolidated its two competing Country stations in the market, making KCGY the sole dedicated Country brand for the cluster. KCGY briefly simulcast on sister station KLEN (106.3 FM) before that station flipped to a top 40 format.

Previous logo
