= Shandon, California =

Shandon
- Unincorporated Community; Census Designated Place
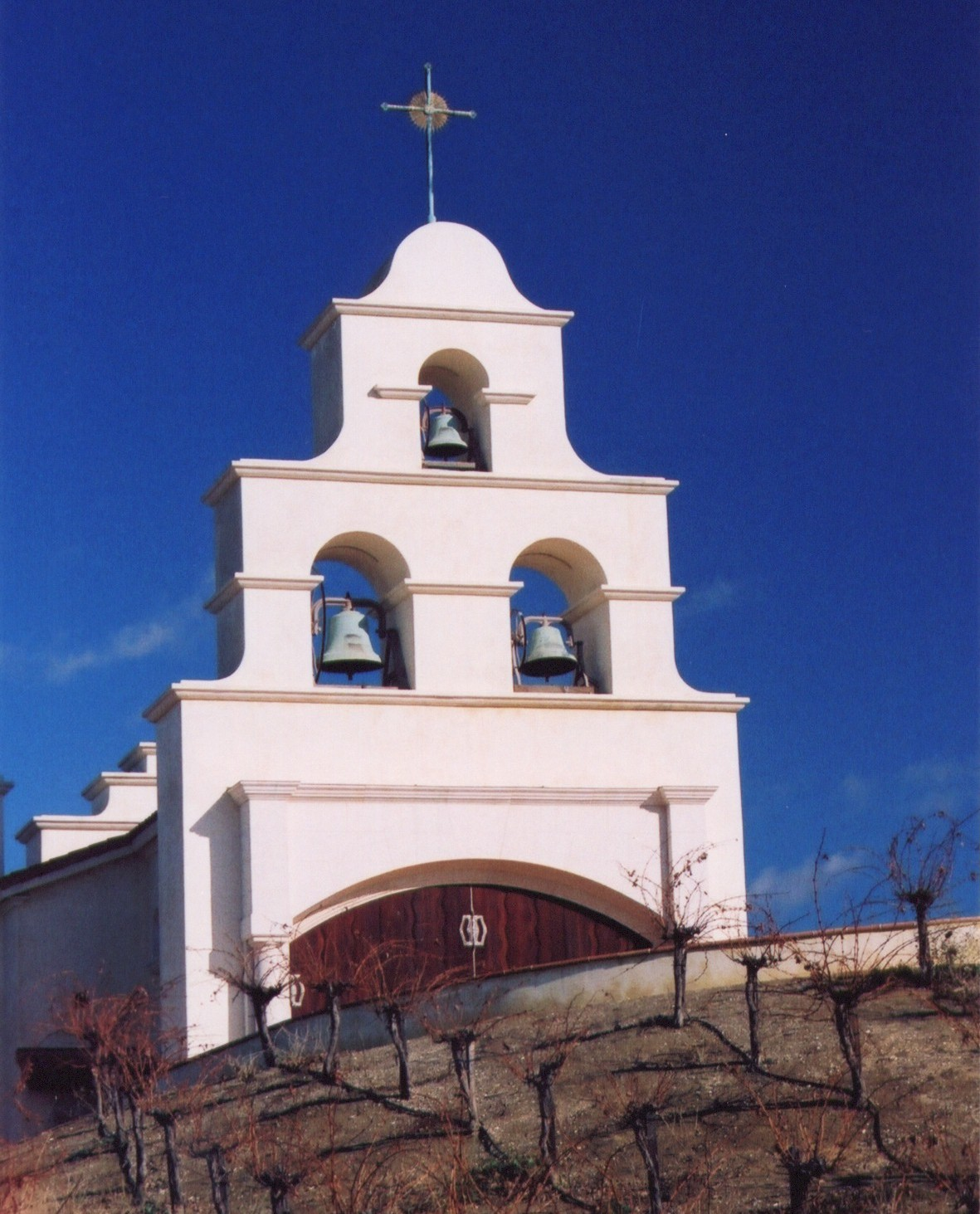
- The Serra Chapel in Shandon.

- Location in San Luis Obispo County and the state of California

- Location in the United States
- Coordinates: 35°39′22″N 120°22′44″W
- Country: United States
- State: California
- County: San Luis Obispo

Area
  - Total: 2.989 sq mi (7.742 km^{2})
  - Land: 2.949 sq mi (7.639 km^{2})
  - Water: 0.044 sq mi (0.113 km^{2}) 1.46%
- Elevation: 1,040 ft (317 m)

Population (2020)
  - Total: 1,168
  - Density: 396.0/sq mi (152.9/km^{2})
- Time zone: UTC-08:00 (PST)
  - Summer (DST): UTC-07:00 (PDT)
- ZIP code: 93461
- Area code: 805
- FIPS code: 06-71134
- GNIS feature IDs: 249342, 2408721

Shandon is a village and census-designated place (CDP) in San Luis Obispo County, California, United States. The population was 1,168 at the 2020 census, down from 1,295 at the 2010 census. Shandon lies by the San Juan River.

== Etymology ==
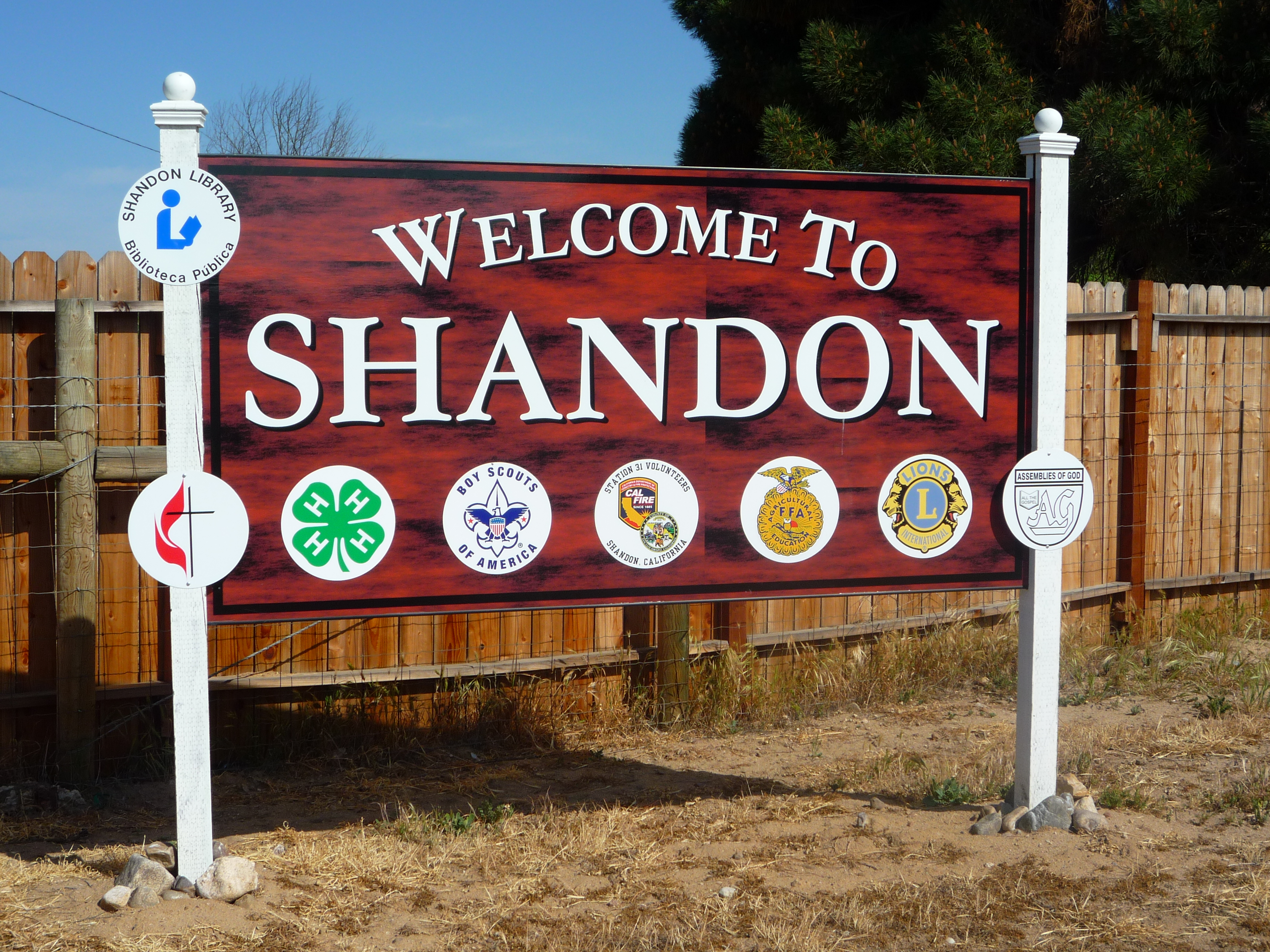
Shandon welcome sign.

The town is named for a town that appeared in Harper's Magazine in 1891.

== Geography ==
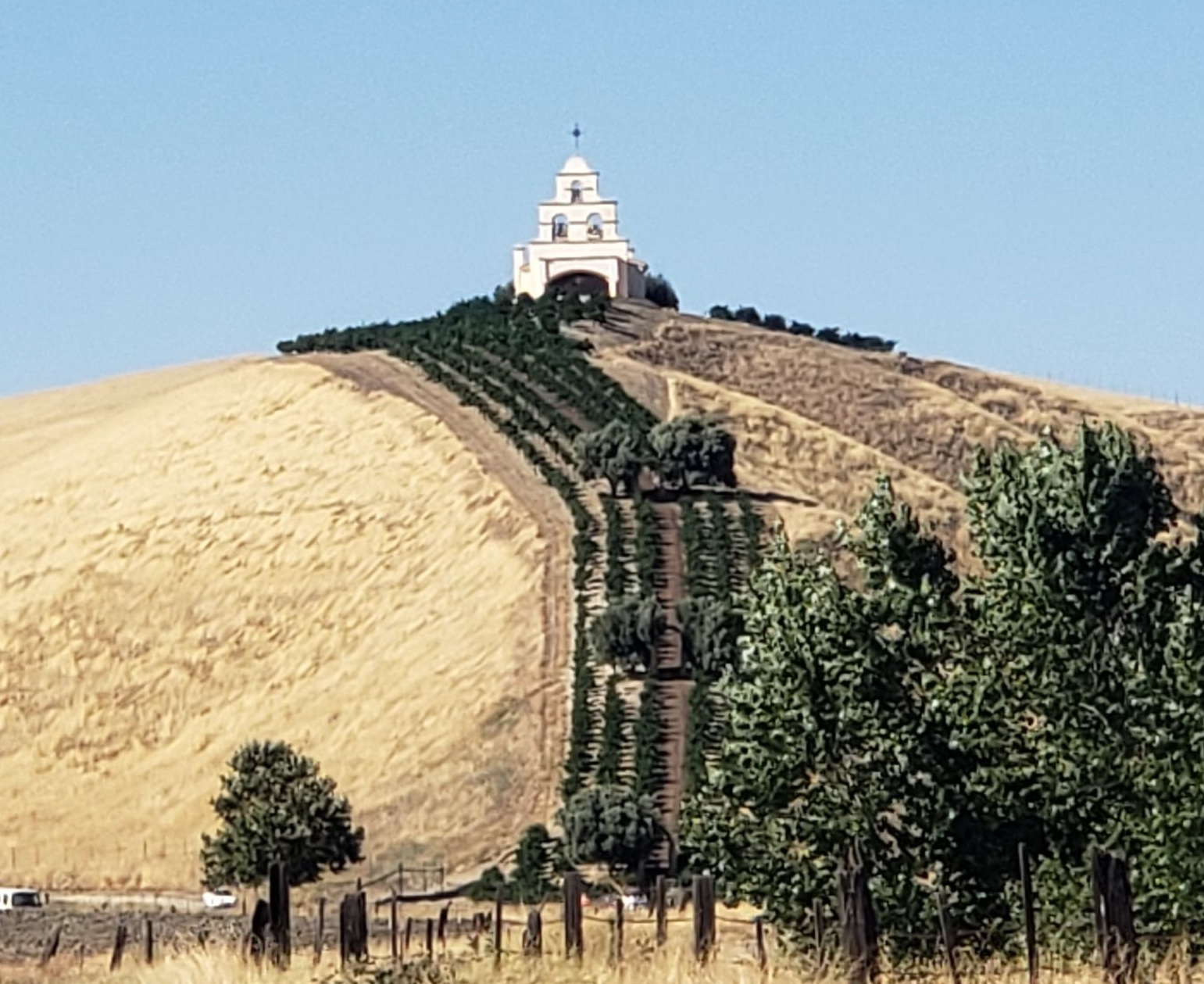
View of the Serra Chapel.

Shandon is located at the bottom of the San Juan Valley, where San Juan Creek and Cholame Creek come together to form the Estrella River, which flows west to meet the Salinas River north of Paso Robles. Shandon is also at the junction of State Routes 41 and 46, at the southwestern portion of the stretch where the two highways merge for approximately six miles. The San Andreas Fault cuts perpendicular to the highways here, six miles from Shandon.

Shandon is located at 35°39′22″N 120°22′44″W (35.656178, -120.378817).

According to the United States Census Bureau, the CDP has a total area of 3.0 square miles (7.8 km^{2}), of which 98.54% is land and 1.46% is water.

=== Climate ===
Shandon experiences a hot-summer Mediterranean climate (Köppen climate classification: Csa), characterized by hot, dry summers and cool, moist winters. Owing to its location inland from the coast, diurnal temperature variation is high, reaching a maximum of 40 °C (104 °F) during summer.

Climate data for Shandon (Paso Robles Municipal Airport)
Month	Jan	Feb	Mar	Apr	May	Jun	Jul	Aug	Sep	Oct	Nov	Dec	Year
Mean daily maximum °F (°C)	60.3 (15.7)	63.4 (17.4)	66.4 (19.1)	73.6 (23.1)	81.1 (27.3)	88.8 (31.6)	93.9 (34.4)	93.7 (34.3)	89.1 (31.7)	80.5 (26.9)	67.8 (19.9)	60.8 (16.0)	76.6 (24.8)
Daily mean °F (°C)	48.0 (8.9)	51.1 (10.6)	53.5 (11.9)	57.3 (14.1)	63.3 (17.4)	69.4 (20.8)	73.8 (23.2)	73.7 (23.2)	70.0 (21.1)	62.5 (16.9)	52.7 (11.5)	47.1 (8.4)	60.2 (15.7)
Mean daily minimum °F (°C)	35.6 (2.0)	38.7 (3.7)	40.5 (4.7)	41.0 (5.0)	45.4 (7.4)	50.0 (10.0)	53.7 (12.1)	53.7 (12.1)	50.8 (10.4)	44.4 (6.9)	37.5 (3.1)	33.3 (0.7)	43.7 (6.5)
Average rainfall inches (mm)	2.83 (72)	2.87 (73)	2.66 (68)	0.68 (17)	0.23 (5.8)	0.02 (0.51)	0.01 (0.25)	0.06 (1.5)	0.36 (9.1)	0.51 (13)	1.12 (28)	1.73 (44)	13.08 (332)
Source: →

== Demographics ==
Historical population
Census	Pop.	Note	%±
2000	986		—
2010	1,295		31.3%
2020	1,168		−9.8%
U.S. Decennial Census; 1860–1870 1880-1890; 1900 1910 1920; 1930 1940 1950; 1960 1970 1980; 1990 2000 2010

Shandon first appeared as a census designated place in the 2000 U.S. census.

=== 2020 census ===
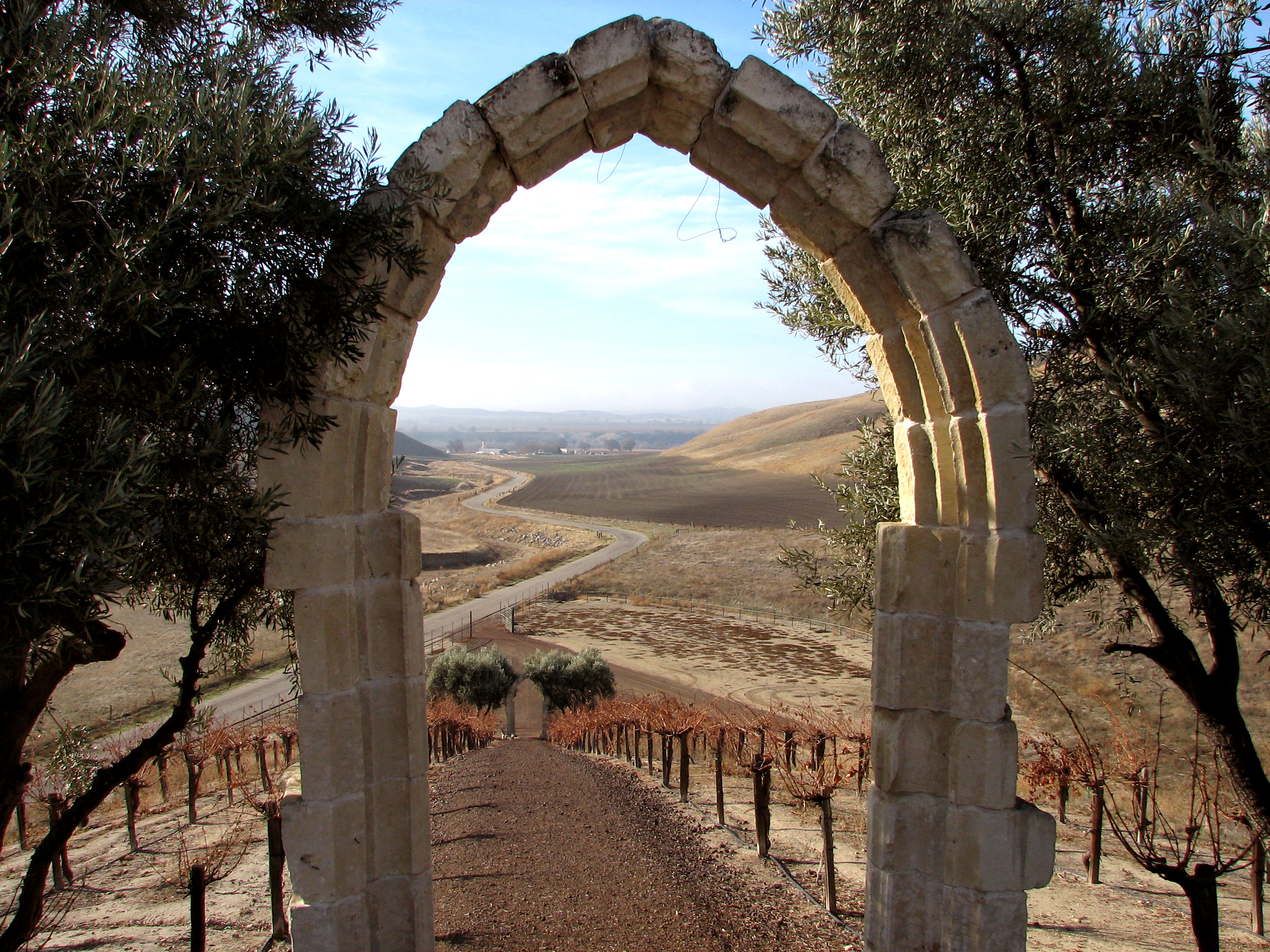
View of Shandon from the Serra Chapel.

As of the 2020 census, Shandon had a population of 1,168 and a population density of 395.9 inhabitants per square mile (152.9/km^{2}). The median age was 33.2 years. The age distribution was 352 people (30.1%) under the age of 18, 104 people (8.9%) aged 18 to 24, 321 people (27.5%) aged 25 to 44, 278 people (23.8%) aged 45 to 64, and 113 people (9.7%) who were 65 years of age or older. For every 100 females, there were 101.4 males, and for every 100 females age 18 and over there were 104.0 males age 18 and over.

The whole population lived in households. There were 369 households, of which 161 (43.6%) had children under the age of 18 living in them. Of all households, 210 (56.9%) were married-couple households, 24 (6.5%) were cohabiting couple households, 71 (19.2%) had a male householder with no spouse or partner present, and 64 (17.3%) had a female householder with no spouse or partner present. About 63 households (17.1%) were made up of individuals, and 31 (8.4%) had someone living alone who was 65 years of age or older. The average household size was 3.17. There were 277 families (75.1% of all households).

There were 377 housing units at an average density of 127.8 units per square mile (49.3 units/km^{2}), of which 369 (97.9%) were occupied. Of these, 252 (68.3%) were owner-occupied and 117 (31.7%) were occupied by renters. The homeowner vacancy rate was 0.0% and the rental vacancy rate was 0.0%.

0.0% of residents lived in urban areas, while 100.0% lived in rural areas.

Racial composition as of the 2020 census
Race	Number	Percent
White	489	41.9%
Black or African American	14	1.2%
American Indian and Alaska Native	14	1.2%
Asian	5	0.4%
Native Hawaiian and Other Pacific Islander	0	0.0%
Some other race	379	32.4%
Two or more races	267	22.9%
Hispanic or Latino (of any race)	702	60.1%

=== Income and poverty ===
In 2023, the US Census Bureau estimated that the median household income was $91,389, and the per capita income was $32,248. About 2.1% of families and 2.5% of the population were below the poverty line.

=== 2010 census ===
At the 2010 census Shandon had a population of 1,295. The population density was 433.2 inhabitants per square mile (167.3/km^{2}). The racial makeup of Shandon was 840 (64.9%) White, 34 (2.6%) African American, 18 (1.4%) Native American, 7 (0.5%) Asian, 2 (0.2%) Pacific Islander, 352 (27.2%) from other races, and 42 (3.2%) from two or more races. Hispanic or Latino of any race were 693 people (53.5%).

The census reported that 1,293 people (99.8% of the population) lived in households, 2 (0.2%) lived in non-institutionalized group quarters, and no one was institutionalized.

There were 371 households, 187 (50.4%) had children under the age of 18 living in them, 219 (59.0%) were opposite-sex married couples living together, 46 (12.4%) had a female householder with no husband present, 24 (6.5%) had a male householder with no wife present. There were 18 (4.9%) unmarried opposite-sex partnerships, and 2 (0.5%) same-sex married couples or partnerships. 62 households (16.7%) were one person and 15 (4.0%) had someone living alone who was 65 or older. The average household size was 3.49. There were 289 families (77.9% of households); the average family size was 3.83.

The age distribution was 418 people (32.3%) under the age of 18, 127 people (9.8%) aged 18 to 24, 373 people (28.8%) aged 25 to 44, 284 people (21.9%) aged 45 to 64, and 93 people (7.2%) who were 65 or older. The median age was 30.6 years. For every 100 females, there were 103.6 males. For every 100 females age 18 and over, there were 104.9 males.

There were 412 housing units at an average density of 137.8 per square mile, of the occupied units 239 (64.4%) were owner-occupied and 132 (35.6%) were rented. The homeowner vacancy rate was 5.5%; the rental vacancy rate was 8.3%. 732 people (56.5% of the population) lived in owner-occupied housing units and 561 people (43.3%) lived in rental housing units.

== Government ==
In the California State Legislature, Shandon is in the 17th senatorial district, represented by Democrat John Laird, and in the 30th Assembly district, represented by Democrat Dawn Addis.

In the United States House of Representatives, Shandon is in California's 19th congressional district, represented by Democrat Jimmy Panetta.

== Business ==
This part of the county's economy is largely based in agriculture. Several large vineyard plantings, including Arciero, Sunview Shandon, Shandon Valley Partners, Red Cedar Vineyards, and French Camp Vineyards, represent important employers in the region.

Shandon has a 15-member paid-call firefighter company who respond to all incidents via radio pager. Company 31 is responsible for maintaining and responding Engine 31 during the summer months. There also is CalFire Station 51 at 501 West Centre Street.

The town has a State of California Department of Transportation (Caltrans) District 5 yard located at 400 West Centre Street.

Shandon is home to Shandon Unified School District, which includes Shandon Elementary, Shandon High School, and Parkfield Elementary.

The Shandon Post Office is located at 200 East Centre Street.

== School ==
Public education in Shandon is provided by the Shandon Joint Unified School District.

=== Sports ===
Shandon High School's varsity mascot is the Outlaws, and the school presently competes in the Coast Valley League.

==== CIF Team Championships ====
- 1979, Southern Section/Small School Division: Girls Basketball

==== CIF Finalists/Team Runner-Up ====
- 1998, Southern Section/8-Man Small Division: Football

== Notable person ==
Former Deputy Secretary of State, National Security Advisor, and United States Secretary of the Interior William P. Clark, Jr. resided near Shandon until his death in August 2013; he built Chapel Hill on the hill above his ranch.
