= KOWB =

- Laramie, Wyoming; United States
- Broadcast area: Albany County and Cheyenne
- Frequency: 1290 kHz
- Branding: KOWB 1290

Programming
- Format: News Talk Information
- Affiliations: Fox News Radio; Fox Sports Radio; Compass Media Networks; Premiere Networks

Ownership
- Owner: Townsquare Media; (Townsquare License, LLC)
- Sister stations: KARS-FM, KCGY

History
- First air date: 1948
- Call sign meaning: For "Cowboy" (the name of the University of Wyoming athletic teams) and often used by the station in promotions as an acronym for "King Of Wyoming Broadcasting".

Technical information
- Licensing authority: FCC
- Facility ID: 24700
- Class: B
- Power: 5,000 watts day 1,000 watts night
- Transmitter coordinates: 41°16′59.9″N 105°34′55″W

Links
- Public license information: Public file; LMS
- Webcast: Listen Live
- Website: kowb1290.com

KOWB (1290 AM) is a radio station broadcasting a news talk information format licensed to operate in Laramie, Wyoming, United States. The station is currently owned by Townsquare Media and features programming from Fox News Radio, Fox Sports Radio, Compass Media Networks, and Premiere Networks.

KOWB serves as a flagship station for the University of Wyoming Cowboys football and men's basketball teams, with game broadcasts often simulcast on its sister station, KCGY (95.1 FM) Its transmitter site, which included a three-tower array, was historically located at 3525 Soldier Springs Road in Laramie. The station is an official affiliate of the Denver Broncos Radio Network and carries Colorado Rockies baseball games.

== History ==
The towers for KOWB located south of Laramie.

The station went on the air as KOWB in 1948. It initially broadcast on the 1340 kHz frequency, later moving to 1280 kHz, and eventually settling on the current frequency of 1290 kHz. The station was owned by native Wyoming sports broadcaster Curt Gowdy for more than two decades, from 1966 until 1992. Gowdy, a Green River, Wyoming native and University of Wyoming alumnus, owned several radio stations in Wyoming and Massachusetts during his career. Gowdy sold his Wyoming broadcast interests in 1992. KOWB is currently owned by Townsquare Media.

Prior to adopting its current format, the station reportedly broadcast an oldies format around the late 1990s.

KOWB won the Station of the Year award from the Wyoming Association of Broadcasters in 2008,

Former logo
