= Estrella River =

- Location of the mouth of the Estrella River in California

Location
- Country: United States
- State: California
- Region: San Luis Obispo County

Physical characteristics
- Source: Confluence of Cholame Creek and San Juan Creek
  - location: Shandon
  - coordinates: 35°39′21″N 120°22′13″W
- Mouth: Salinas River
  - location: San Miguel
  - coordinates: 35°44′30″N 120°41′33″W
- Length: 28.5 mi (45.9 km)

The Estrella River is a 28.5-mile-long (45.9 km) tributary river in eastern San Luis Obispo County, California. The river forms at the confluence of Cholame Creek, from the north, and San Juan Creek, from the south, near the town of Shandon. From there it flows west-northwest to its confluence with the Salinas River, of which it is a tributary, 8 miles (12.8 km) north of Paso Robles. Cholame Creek has its headwaters on the southwest side of Middle Mountain and its tributary, Little Cholame Creek, begins on the northeast side. The creek drains the Cholame Valley, which is bordered by Diablo Range on the east and Cholame Hills, a northern extension of the Temblor Range, on the west. The average precipitation in the area ranges from 11 to 17 inches (280 to 430 mm), increasing northward.

A portion of the Temblor Range drains into San Juan Creek, but the nearby Carrizo Plain has been cut off from the watershed by tectonic action. The creek also drains part of the La Panza Range in the southwest of the watershed. The vast majority of the land in the watershed is rangeland, but there is also some cropland, pastureland and developed areas.

== Bibliography ==
- San Luis Obispo County Water
- United States Department of Agriculture - Carrizo Plain
- United States Department of Agriculture - Estrella Watershed
