= Little Cholame Creek =

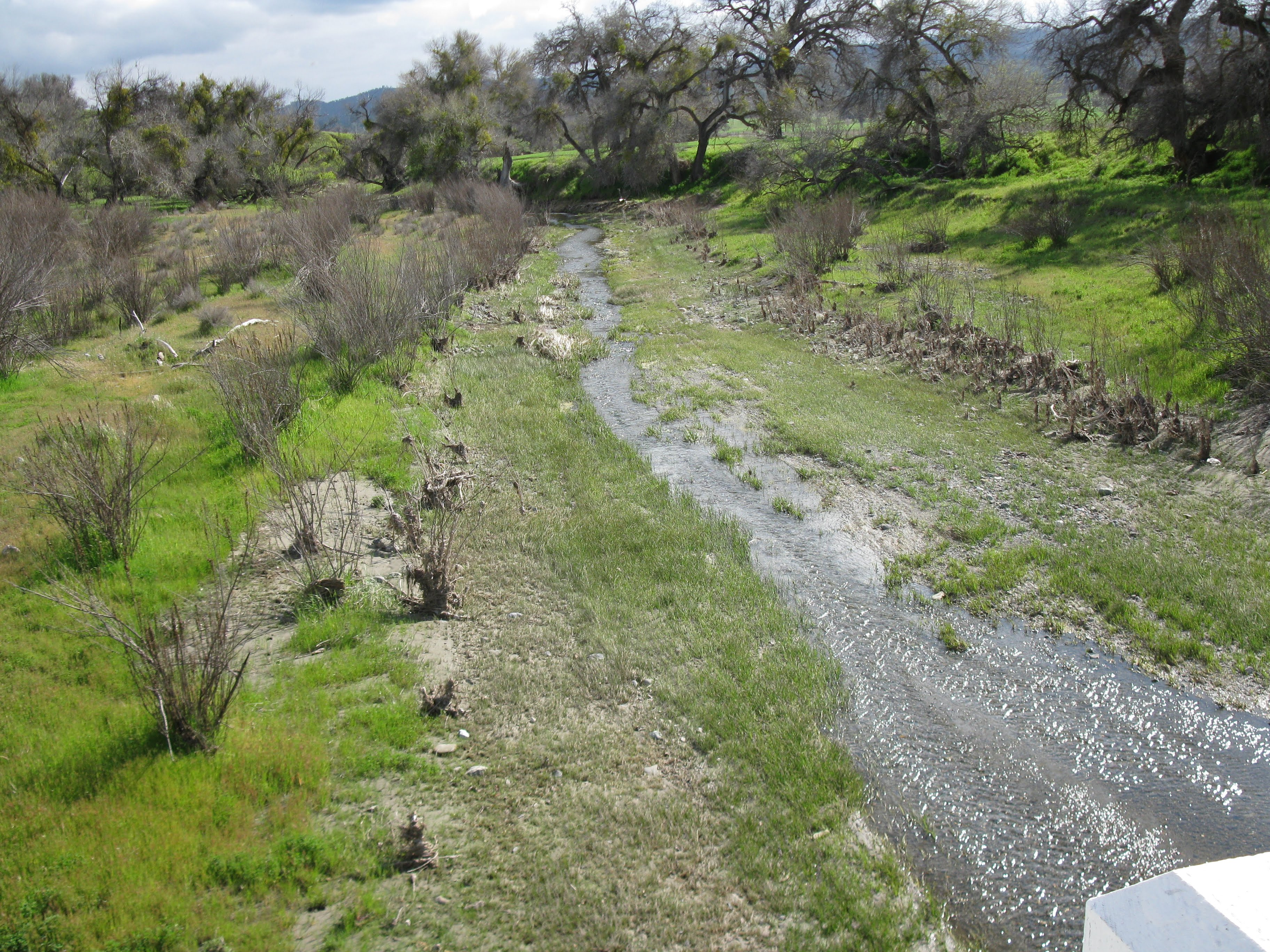
- Little Cholame Creek at crossing over San Andreas Fault

- Location of the mouth of Little Cholame Creek in California

Location
- Country: United States
- State: California
- Region: Monterey County
- City: Parkfield, California

Physical characteristics
- Source: On the southern flank of an unnamed peak in the southern part of the Diablo Range
  - coordinates: 35°59′13″N 120°31′09″W
  - elevation: 2,690 ft (820 m)
- Mouth: Parkfield, California
  - coordinates: 35°54′32″N 120°31′09″W
  - elevation: 1,560 ft (480 m)
- Length: 8 mi (13 km)

Basin features
- Tributaries
  - left: Reason Mountain, Pine Canyon Creek, Joaquin Canyon Creek
  - right: Middle Mountain Ridge

Little Cholame Creek is a perennial stream in southeastern Monterey County, California, United States. The headwaters rise from an unnamed peak 2 miles (3 kilometres) southwest of Reason Mountain, in the southern part of the Diablo Range. From there, the creek flows southeast along Parkfield-Coalinga Road, before reaching confluence with Cholame Creek.

== History ==
"Cholame" is a Yokuts Native American word meaning "the beautiful one". The creek runs through the northern part of Cholame Valley, along Parkfield-Coalinga Road, and on through the small town of Parkfield before crossing the San Andreas Fault and merging with Cholame Creek.

== See also ==
- Riparian zone
