= John A. Power =

English rugby league player

John A. Power is a former English professional rugby league footballer (born 23 December 1976 (age 48) in Rochdale, Greater Manchester, England).

== Career ending injury ==
John was just 18 when he suffered a devastating spinal cord injury, while playing for Oldham RLFC 'A' team. It ended his promising career as a professional rugby player.
