= The Hounds =

Anti-foreigner gang in San Francisco

The Hounds, west coast counterparts of New York's Bowery Boys, were a nativist or anti-foreigner gang of San Francisco which specifically targeted recently arrived immigrants, particularly Chileans and other Hispanic Americans, during the California Gold Rush of 1849.

Officially called the San Francisco Society of Regulators, the gang, mostly made up of thugs and criminals as well as former Mexican–American War veterans, would later become known as The Hounds. Controlled by the "Know Nothing" political party, the gang used patriotism in the aftermath of the Mexican–American War to drive foreigners from the recently discovered gold fields. The Hounds had early popular support despite their brutal tactics, as many of the gang attacked unarmed Mexican and Chilean immigrants in Clarks Point and extorted money from those few who were successful. The Hounds soon began demanding protection money from the city residents, indiscriminately looting and burning stores and killing anyone who resisted.

On July 15, 1849, the Hounds attacked the area called "Little Chile" (Spanish: Chilecito), robbing and killing several immigrants. While city officials were previously hesitant to take action against the Hounds, this attack finally turned the public against them. With money collected for the city alcalde, Dr. T.M. Leavenworth along with Sam Brannan, Captain Beezer Simmons, and other citizens demanded the city take action and later 230 men were deputized to arrest the Hounds. However, most of the gang had fled the city by this time, although around 20 members, including a leader of the Hounds, Sam Roberts, were captured by troops led by merchant Isaac Bluxome, Jr. Roberts and another member called Saunders were sentenced to ten years imprisonment, while the other members were given shorter sentences. However, the influence of "Know Nothing" politicians was able to overturn these convictions. The public resentment and hostility toward the gang, however, would prevent the Hounds from reorganizing. Most left the city shortly after their release. Some of these moved to the mining camps where they soon met harsher fates at the hands of the miners assemblies. Some like Jack Powers who fled south into Southern California continued to cause trouble there long afterward.

The San Francisco Police Department and the Chilean consulate in San Francisco were each established about one month after The Hounds July 15 attack on Little Chile.

== See also ==
- Chileans in the California gold rush
