= French Camp Vineyards =

Vineyard in San Luis Obispo County, California, US

Coordinates: 35°29′36″N 120°14′26″W

- Location: San Luis Obispo County, US
- Appellation: San Robles, Paso Robles Highlands District
- Founded: 1973
- First vintage: 1976
- Key people: Greg O'Quest(Manager), Nick De Luca (Sales), Steve Miller (Owner), Nicholas Miller (Owner)
- Known for: Anglim, Edna Valley, Fess Parker, Fetzer, Kendell Jackson, Mosby, Tobin James, Mid Life Crisis
- Varietals: Zinfandel, Syrah, Chardonnay, Merlot, Grenache, Petite Sirah, Sangiovese, Sauvignon blanc, Lagrein, Cabernet Sauvignon
- Website: frenchcampvineyards.com

French Camp Vineyards is a vineyard in San Luis Obispo County, California, U.S. located east of Paso Robles residing in the Paso Robles Highlands District viticultural area.

== History ==
Originally, the French Camp land was part of the San Juan Ranch. Over time, The San Juan Ranch was split into a number of parcels including the French Camp area, which became a part of the Camatta Ranch. The Miller family purchased The Camatta Ranch property in 1968, believing that it could be developed to various crops including wine grapes. They leased parts of it out for a few years while they gathered information as to climate, soils, and water for irrigation. Initially, 200 acres (0.8 km^{2}) were planted to wine grapes in 1973.

The French Camp operation is a team effort among the people who have grown the grapes, those that have managed its business affairs, those that have sold the production (whether it was grapes or cuttings), and those that have done strategic planning for future growth.

Working together, this group has grown French Camp to over 1,700 acres (688 ha).

== Vineyard mechanization ==
In cooperation with the University of Arkansas, Dr. Justin Morris (Director of Food Science & Engineering at U of A), and OXBO International, Hank Ashby, Vineyard Manager for French Camp Vineyards has adopted a new method for producing a better balanced and consistent crop.

The Morris-Oldridge canopy management system achieves yields within 10% of the yield goal. By using mechanization for pruning, shoot thinning, and fruit thinning, crop levels can be adjusted several times during the growing season. This practice would be cost prohibitive if not for mechanization.

In the average vineyard, annual yield can very as much as 50% year to year, making it very difficult to predict budgetary and wine productions numbers.

Moreover, in conjunction with Paso Robles Wine Services, French Camp has conducted trials demonstrating better quality fruit production as a result of the balanced cropping technique when compared against hand farmed fruit in many cases.
