= Jack Power (footballer) =

Australian rules footballer, born 1910

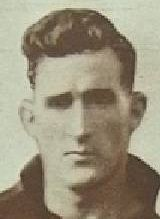

Personal information
- Full name: John Patrick Power
- Born: 16 March 1910; Bendigo, Victoria
- Died: 26 September 1988 (aged 78)
- Original team: Police/CYMS
- Height: 185 cm (6 ft 1 in)
- Weight: 95 kg (209 lb)

Playing career^{1}
| Years | Club | Games (Goals) |
| 1930–34 | Melbourne | 36 (6) |
| 1935 | Collingwood | 3 (0) |
| Total | | 39 (6) |
- ^{1} Playing statistics correct to the end of 1935.

John Patrick Power (16 March 1910 – 26 September 1988) was an Australian rules footballer who played with Melbourne and Collingwood in the Victorian Football League (VFL).

The son of policeman John Joseph Power (1873–1953) and Mary Elizabeth Power, née Cull (1876–1966), John Patrick Power was born in Bendigo on 16 March 1910.
