= John Power (cricketer) =

Australian cricketer

Personal information
- Born: 23 March 1932; Melbourne, Australia
- Died: 6 April 2005 (aged 73); Sydney, Australia

Domestic team information
- Years: Team
- 1953-1960: Victoria
- Source: Cricinfo, 2 December 2015

John Power (23 March 1932 – 6 April 2005) was an Australian cricketer. He played 26 first-class cricket matches for Victoria between 1953 and 1960.

== See also ==
- List of Victoria first-class cricketers
