= Elizabeth Owens (schooner) =

Elizabeth Owens was a schooner, built in 1857, at the new San Francisco shipyard of shipbuilder Henry Owens at Steamboat Point where 4th Street met Mission Bay. She was the first ship built in the yard and was named for his wife. Under Captain Albert Bogard, her first voyage was to obtain green turtle and was the first ship to trade at Santa Catalina Island.

From 1858, she was used in the Colorado River trade and in the Gulf of California carrying passengers and cargo:

"The schooner Elizabeth Owen, Capt-Albert Bogart, Arrived here, says the San Diego Herald of the 21st of August, on Thursday morning, from Guaymas, which, place she left on the 16th of July. She left in Adair Bay the barque Rebecca, to sail for San Francisco on the 25th. ... The Elizabeth Owens sailed from San Francisco on the 3d of June, for the mouth of the Colorado, but was obliged to put into Guaymas for water. She continued her voyage to the river, and returned for cargo. The notorious Jack Powers went down on the schooner from San Francisco to Guaymas, and was still there when the vessel left, notwithstanding the reports that he has lately been seen in Lower California. The Elizabeth Owens has on board 22 tons of wheat and 250 hides, from Guaymas, and 10 tons of silver ore from the Heintzleman mine, near Tubac. The schooner sailed for San Francisco yesterday."

Elizabeth Owens was later sold to the government for the use of the coastal survey department.

In February 1866, under Captain H. J. Pippy she was carrying trade between San Francisco and San Diego and intermediate ports for De Blois & Co's Southern Packet Line.

Elizabeth Owens was wreaked off of Seal Rocks below Cliff House, on April 22, 1866.
