= San Juan Creek (Estrella River tributary) =

Stream in San Luis Obispo County, California

San Juan Creek is a tributary stream of the Estrella River in San Luis Obispo County, California.

Heading at 35°08′08″N 120°02′19″W in the La Panza Range, at an elevation of 3,200 feet / 980 meters, it runs 45 miles to its confluence with the Estrella River. Its mouth lies at an elevation of 1,014 feet / 309 meters, at its confluence with the Estrella River, near the town of Shandon, California.
