= John Powers (sports journalist) =

American journalist and author

John Leonard Powers (born November 6, 1948) is an American journalist and author. He wrote for The Boston Globe for more than four decades in the Sports, Metro, Sunday Magazine, and Living sections, later becoming a freelance correspondent for the newspaper.

== Early life and education ==
John Leonard Powers was born in Cambridge, Massachusetts, the first child of a Boston policeman, Powers graduated in 1966 from Boston Latin School.

In 1970 he earned an A.B. cum laude from Harvard University and, while there, wrote for the sports section of The Harvard Crimson student newspaper. From 1970 to 1972, Powers served as a United States Navy line officer aboard an aircraft carrier, the USS Franklin D. Roosevelt.

== Career ==
Powers joined the Globe sports staff in 1973, and has covered every Olympic Games (summer and winter) since 1976, except the 1980 Summer Olympics in Moscow, when the U.S. boycott led the Russians to refuse to issue a visa.

Besides covering the Olympics, Powers has written about nearly all major sports, at both the college and professional levels, and filed stories from five continents. His range encompasses not only "major" sports like football, baseball, and basketball, but includes smaller sports like gymnastics and rowing.

He was a vital contributor to The Third H Book of Harvard Athletics, the standard reference on the athletic history of his alma mater. In soccer, Powers has reported from five FIFA World Cups and two FIFA Women's World Cups.

He has led the Boston Globe's coverage of the Boston Marathon and covered that event for nearly five decades.

== Appraisal ==
Many sportswriters consider him the dean of Olympic journalists.

Powers was an integral part of a highly regarded sportswriting team at the Globe. “From the mid-1970s to the early '80s,” Sports Illustrated wrote in 2009, “the Globe contained arguably the greatest collection of reporting talent ever assembled in a sports section…” He has also written or co-authored 11 books.

== Honors and awards ==
Powers shared the 1983 Pulitzer Prize for National Reporting for a special issue of The Boston Globe Sunday Magazine titled “War and Peace in the Nuclear Age.”

In 2011, Powers received the Boston Athletic Association's Will Cloney Award, presented to an individual who has promoted the sport of running, especially locally.

Powers was a Poynter Fellow at Yale University.

== Bibliography ==
- The Short Season: A Boston Celtics Diary, 1977-78. HarperCollins, 1979. ISBN 978-0060134518
- Yankees: An Illustrated History (with George Sullivan). Prentice Hall, 1982. ISBN 978-0139718120
- One Goal: A Chronicle of the 1980 U.S. Olympic Hockey Team (with Arthur C. Kaminsky). HarperCollins, 1984. ISBN 978-0060152000
- Mary Lou: Creating an Olympic Champion (with Mary Lou Retton). McGraw-Hill, 1985. ISBN 978-0440155089
- Seasons to Remember: The Way It Was in American Sports, 1945-60 (with Curt Gowdy). HarperCollins, 1993. ISBN 978-0060182281
- The Boston Handbook (with illustrator Peter Wallace). On Cape Publications, 1999. ISBN 978-0975850275
- The Boston Dictionary (with illustrator Peter Wallace). On Cape Publications, 2004. ISBN 978-0971954700
- Fenway Park: A Salute to the Coolest, Cruelest, Longest-Running Major League Baseball Stadium in America (with Ron Driscoll). Running Press Adult, 2012. ISBN 978-0762442041
- The Third H Book of Harvard Athletics: 1963-2012 (with John Veneziano). Harvard Varsity Club, 2014.
- The Head of the Charles Regatta: First 50 Head of the Charles Regatta, 2015. ISBN 978-0692458570
- Fridays with Bill: Inside the Football Mind of Bill Belichick Thorndike Books, 2018. ISBN 978-1629376295
