= Jack Powers =

Irish-American professional gambler and outlaw

Jack Powers (c. 1827 – October 26, 1860), whose real name was John A. Power, was an Irish-born American outlaw who emigrated to New York as a child and later served as a volunteer soldier in the Mexican–American War in the garrison of Santa Barbara, California. During the California Gold Rush, he was a well-known professional gambler and a famed horseman in the gold camps as well as in San Francisco, Santa Barbara and Los Angeles.

Powers had two brushes with the law. He was tried as a member of The Hounds in San Francisco in 1849, and was also involved in a dispute over the ownership of a ranch in Santa Barbara County in 1853. In 1856, at Santa Barbara, Powers protected a fugitive from the vigilantes of San Francisco and helped him escape. When his role was revealed the following year, he was harassed by vigilantes in Los Angeles, who accused him of being the leader of a criminal gang there. Long known for his skills as a horseman, on May 2, 1858, he set a record-breaking time in a 150-mile race. Soon after this race, he was accused by San Luis Obispo vigilantes of complicity in the 1857 murder of two men, and of being the head of a notorious bandit gang that plagued the southern central coastal region of California along the El Camino Real, with robberies and murders in San Luis Obispo County and Santa Barbara County between 1853 and 1858. This gang was later named the Jack Powers Gang in 1883, by Jesse D. Mason in his History of Santa Barbara County California.

Escaping the vigilantes by fleeing to Sonora, Powers attempted to return to California in 1860, but was murdered and robbed by his vaqueros at Calabasas just inside the Arizona Territory.

Jack Powers was described at the time of the May 1858 long-distance race in the Daily Alta California as being "a spare built man, with full sunburnt face, heavy hair and whiskers, and a keen eye."

== Early life ==
Born in Ireland in 1827 as John A. Power, he came to the United States with his parents in 1836, and settled with them in New York City. John was 19 years of age when the Mexican–American War commenced in 1846, and he and his older brother Edward joined Company G of the 1st Regiment of New York Volunteers with many of his friends from New York. His brother was made a corporal. His brother-in-law, Charles Heffernan, enlisted in Company F, accompanied by his wife, John's sister. The New York Volunteers was a unit organized by Colonel Jonathan D. Stevenson to occupy and settle California, and men in the unit were promised land in the region should the war be successful.

== Early years in California ==
In San Francisco, Power and his brother transferred to Company F under Captain Francis J. Lippitt, one of three companies of the 1st New York Volunteers which were then sent to Santa Barbara, California. The two other companies were soon sent to occupy towns in the southern part of Baja California Territory, where they saw some action before the end of the war. Power and his company remained in Santa Barbara as a garrison, in relative idleness until the disbanding of the regiment in September 1848, just a few months after the beginning of the California Gold Rush.

Power remained in the town as a gambler until late in the year, when he left for the mines with his brother-in-law in a party of other men of his regiment. One of those men, James Lynch, later wrote an account of that journey to the goldfields and of their return to San Francisco for the winter of 1848 in his 1882 book, With Stevenson to California, 1846–1848.

When Power returned to San Francisco for the winter, he became a gambler there and also became associated with the San Francisco Society of Regulators. He was subsequently accused of being a member of the notorious anti-immigrant criminal gang "The Hounds" by a popular vigilante movement organized to rid the city of the gang after a particularly violent episode against a Chilean settlement in the city during the summer of 1849. On Monday, July 23, 1849, the vigilantes arrested and made prisoners of 20 of the Hounds, including John Power, who were then arraigned on charges of conspiracy, riot, robbery, and assault with intent to kill; all plead not guilty. While several others were convicted of various charges, Power was found not guilty on all charges.

Despite being acquitted, Power subsequently left San Francisco for the goldfields. There he was said to have had some success. That August he went to Stockton, the gateway to the Southern Mines, where with $10,000 to $15,000, in a spectacular run of luck, he broke the bank of several large gambling establishments. He acquired a fortune variously said to be $50,000 or $175,000, sufficient to make him a wealthy man. He intended to return by steamboat to San Francisco, then take steamships to New York, where he could take care of his widowed mother, who had remained there when he and his brother had left for California. However, persuaded to attempt to make his fortune larger by gambling, he lost most of it, and never left for New York. Instead he became a noted gambler and horseman in San Francisco and at the resort of Mission Dolores between late 1849 and 1851. By this time he had become known as Jack Power, and was well known to influential people in the city and in state politics.

William Redmond Ryan described meeting Jack Power returning from the Mission Dolores in 1849:

"... Jack Power, one of the sporting characters of the country. Jack had been a volunteer; and, on the disbanding of the regiment, becoming infected with the excitement and adventurous character of the wild life which he had led since his arrival in the country, had devoted himself entirely to gambling and horsemanship, in both of which accomplishments he greatly excelled."

"No matter how low the state of his finances, he was never without a good horse, caparisoned in the true Californian fashion; ... It had, however, this striking peculiarity, that it would never gallop straight forward towards any given point, but would advance in a sort of sidelong canter, very pleasing to behold, but requiring great skill on the part of the rider to maintain his seat. In this eccentric movement of the animal Power took great delight, for it afforded him opportunities of displaying his superior horsemanship."

Ryan went on to say that in addition to his other accomplishments, he was also an excellent performer on the banjo; "and one evening, with three or four others, gave a concert in the dining-saloon of the Parker House, which was suitably arranged for the occasion; and, although the tickets for admission were three dollars each, the attraction of our Nimrod's celebrity ensured a numerous attendance."

== Return to Santa Barbara and the Arroyo Burro Affair ==
Power returned to Santa Barbara in 1851. From there he often traveled to San Francisco, Los Angeles and other places to gamble and race horses. During this time he was nearly killed at a ball given by a respected Californio family after insulting the young ladies of the family. He was severely knifed by their young male relatives outside the house. Upon recovering from his wounds he swore to give up his wild life and settle down to a quieter, more industrious life.

In 1852, he established a rancho to raise pigs along the Arroyo Burro on lands formerly belonging to the Mission Santa Barbara that he claimed were public lands he was entitled to settle by the conditions for his service in Stevenson's Regiment. This same land had been leased by Richard S. Den and Daniel A. Hill from the Mission some years earlier. Den also claimed to have an 1846 grant to these lands from the last Mexican governor. Power challenged that claim in the state courts over the next year.

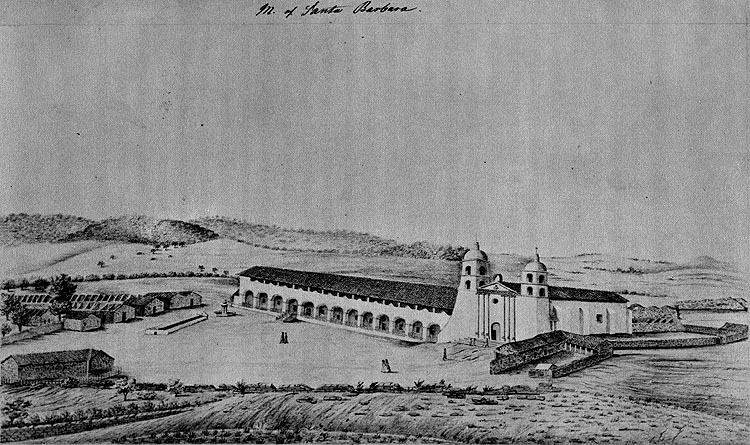
Mission Santa Barbara in 1856; view from the northeast. The Powers rancho lay behind the Mission to the right. Powers left the rancho three years before this picture was made.

Meanwhile, on June 10, 1851, Jack Power led a 25-man posse against a party of "about 100" armed Native Americans from the San Joaquin Valley that had come to San Buenaventura to trade, some of whom were stealing horses or taking them at gun point. Two men with them were given up to the posse and stolen horses were recovered. These men had murdered a peddler and escaped jail in Santa Barbara, and both also led a gang of horse thieves. They were subsequently tried and hung. In July 1852, Jack was one of a posse that returned two accused murderers, a Californio named Doroteo Zabaleta and a Sonoran named Jesus Rivas, from Santa Barbara to Los Angeles for trial.

In 1853, a state court case regarding the Arroyo Burro rancho ended with a ruling in Den and Hill's favor. Power refused to leave his rancho after losing his court case in the state district and supreme courts, claiming it was not within the state's jurisdiction to decide the matter but rather the interest of federal courts. Power, with a group of friends, vowed to resist being evicted. Also a member of Stevenson's Regiment, Sheriff W. W. Twist's attempt to evict Power resulted in a bloody clash in the town between some of Power's friends and the sheriff who was organizing a posse of 200 who were about to attempt to eject him from his ranch by force. Twist was badly wounded but managed to kill his assailant, a Californio summoned to serve in the posse. One of Power's friends, John Vidal, a fellow member of Power's company in the Stevenson Regiment, was killed and two others were wounded. Power fled back to his rancho chased by some of the posse. Power and his friends including James Lynch, then visiting Santa Barbara, saw them off after they took a few shots at long distance and saw they were well-armed and ready for them.

After a standoff for a period of time, Power was eventually persuaded to leave his ranch after he was granted a lease to harvest his crops and move his stock and possessions off the land. Following his loss of the rancho, Power continued living in Santa Barbara County, leasing a part of the Rancho Laguna in the Guadalupe Valley, in the north of the county, abandoning pig farming and living by gambling and racing horses as before.

== Second conflict with the vigilante movement ==
In 1856, Power protected and hid the politician Ned McGowan from a posse of the San Francisco Committee of Vigilance, who came looking for McGowan in Santa Barbara. This earned Jack Power the enmity of that movement after McGowan released a book detailing his adventures and Power's role in aiding his escape. It earned Power the title of "The Notorious" before his name in the San Francisco Bulletin and other newspaper articles from then on.

The newfound notoriety soon led to Power being accused in early 1857 by a group of Los Angeles vigilantes (who were also after the Flores Daniel Gang) of being the head of a burglary ring that had been plaguing Los Angeles, a place Power often visited to gamble and race horses. Arrested on a warrant from Los Angeles by the Sheriff of Santa Barbara, he made bail but soon fled Santa Barbara, before a Los Angeles vigilante posse came for him on that charge. That he fled seemed understandable when the news came that the posse had summarily lynched two other men accused of being members of the Flores Daniel Gang while traveling through the area of the Mission San Buenaventura on their way to arrest Power.

Arrested in San Francisco, Power fought extradition to Los Angeles while the vigilantes maintained influence there. Eventually he lost the fight in the California Supreme Court and was extradited to Los Angeles, but with the vigilantes no longer holding sway, the court in Los Angeles dismissed his case for lack of evidence.

== The Great Match Against Time ==
A little over a year later, on May 2, 1858, Jack Power rode in a famous time over distance horse race, called by its promoter The Great Match Against Time, at the Pioneer Race Course south of San Francisco. Here he set a record time of 6 hours and 43 minutes over a distance of 150 miles, with 24 California mustang horses, mostly belonging to him. The Daily Alta California wrote:

The farthest any one horse was ridden at a time was 4 miles, and the least distance 1 mile. He ran at top speed the whole distance. On taking a new horse, he would spring from the saddle, run a few steps, to stretch his legs, and immediately vault into the saddle of the animal which awaited him. Attendants sometimes made the rounds with him, tendering him drink, and receiving his orders.

At the end of the race Power "publicly offered to bet $5,000 that he would ride 50 miles in 2 hours; and that no other man in California could perform the feat he had just accomplished;. ... The average time of the race is within a fraction of 23 miles an hour. Powers does not hesitate to assert that he can make much better time than the above."

== Bandit leader? ==
In late May 1858, shortly after that long-distance race, Power was again accused of crimes, this time for his alleged role in the activities of Pio Linares and his gang by a committee of San Luis Obispo vigilantes. The gang was exposed by witnesses whom some of the gang had allowed to live, following the robbery and murder of two Frenchmen and the kidnapping of the wife of one of the victims at Rancho San Juan Capistrano del Camote, and the killing of a witness named Gilkey nearby in San Luis Obispo County. These accusations against Power were based on the confession of one of the accused bandits, Jose Antonio Garcia, who had been discovered at a nearby rancho by a vigilante posse hunting for the gang. Power was accused in Garcia's possibly coerced confession of participating with the gang in the killing of two Basque cattlemen in late 1857 on the Nacimiento River near San Miguel.

The vigilantes also made out Power as secretly being the outlaw gang leader of this group of highway-robbers and murderers of the victims and witnesses, including Linares, Garcia and others, operating in southern and central California for several years since the fall of 1853. During the Gold Rush era, from 1849 to 1858, numerous robberies and murders had been committed by bandits on the stretch of El Camino Real through San Luis Obispo County and Santa Barbara County, making it the most dangerous route in the state.

On the basis of these accusations, on May 31, 1858, Governor John B. Weller issued rewards for the arrests of the gang members still at large:

$2,500 REWARD.

WHEREAS, IT IS REPRESENTED To me by the citizens of San Luis Obispo that several atrocious murders and robberies have recently been perpetrated at San Miguel, San Juan de Capistrano, and Camate; and that upon the oath, of respectable men, these crimes have been charged upon the following persons, who are still at large, viz:

JACK POWERS, an Irishman, and generally known as a gambler.

PIO LINARES, is a native of this country, has a slightly dark complexion, is slender, has large sleepy eyes, and without beard.

EL HUERO (light or empty headed) RAFEAL is tall, slender, and quite handsome, with a light mustache.

MIGUEL BLANCO, is also of this country; of low stature, about 20 years of age, is handsome very fair, with a bold face and without beard.

DISEDERIO GRIZALYA, is small and slender, has somewhat dark complexion, large eyes, half open like the eyes of a cat, has no beard and is jovial and pleasant in his manners.

JESUS VALENZUELA, is slender; brother to Joaquin Valenzuela; one of the five Joaquins, and is also called Jesus Chiquito.

NIEVES ROBLES alias FLORIAN SERVIN has a round face, somewhat dark complexion is small, and about 23 years of age.

LUCIANO, El Mestino, or Herdsman, is a hunter of the Tulares.

Now, therefore, by virtue of the power vested in me, by Constitution and laws of this State I hereby offer the following REWARDS for their arrest and conviction:

For JACK POWERS, Five Hundred Dollars

For PIO LINARES. Five Hundred Dollars

For RAFEAL MONEY, alias RAFEAL HENADA. alias EL HUERO RAFEAL, Five Hundred Dollars.

For MIGUEL BLANCO, Two Hundred Dollars.

For DESEDERIO GRIZALVA, Two Hundred Dollars.

For NIEYES ROBLES, Two Hundred Dollars.

For JESUS VALENZUELA, alias JESUS CHIQUITO, Two Hundred Dollars.

For LUCIANO, El Mestino, Two Hundred Dollars.

Done at Sacramento, California, this 31st day of May, A. D., One Thousand Eight Hundred and Fifty-Eight. In witness whereof I have hereunto set my hand, and affixed the Great Seal of the State. JOHN B. WELLER. Attest: Ferris Forman, Secretary of State.

(reformated from continuous text for easier reading)

After the state governor issued this $500 reward for him on May 31, Power, fearing arrest and delivery to vigilante justice in San Luis Obispo, was aided by friends in San Francisco who hid him from the police until he could flee the state on June 3, 1858 (~$18,606 in 2025). The August 27 Daily Alta California later reported:

The Elizabeth Owens sailed from San Francisco on the 3d of June, for the mouth of the Colorado, but was obliged to put into Guaymas for water. ... The notorious Jack Powers went down on the schooner from San Francisco to Guaymas, and was still there when the vessel left, notwithstanding the reports that he has lately been seen in Lower California.

Garcia, the one witness that placed Power at the scene of one of the gang's crimes, was hung by the vigilantes at San Luis Obispo on Tuesday, June 8, 1858. His hanging precluded his being held as a witness for a trial of Power, five days after Power had left San Francisco for Mexico.

== Exile in Sonora and Death in New Mexico Territory ==
From the Los Angeles Star, on October 9, 1858, came word from Jack Powers:

The notorious Jack Powers is in Hermosillo. He has plenty of money, and is enjoying himself as if nothing had happened. He says that in two years he intends to return to San Francisco.

In June 1859, from Sonora, in the Guaymas correspondence of the San Francisco Herald came the following:

Jack Powers, about whom so much has been said, has located himself at Hermosillo, where he has opened a fine hotel. Jack is in high feather with the Pesqueira Government and the Mexicans generally, and in consequence is able to render great assistance to Americans traveling through the country, who are free to stop at Hermosillo. And to his credit be it said, that he has in all cases where it has come under his notice aided them. I know two parties myself, who left free, that took letters to Jack. Jack says he is no friend to filibusters, as the Mexicans have treated him kindly, but will aid his countrymen whenever and wherever he can, who are peaceably traveling through the country or pursuing a legitimate calling in it. He says in a short time he will again visit California and face his enemies.

The September 30, 1860 Daily Alta California, reported:

Jack Powers left, a short time ago, for Arizona. He has, I believe, purchased a ranch a few miles from Tucson, on which he intends to keep some horses he bought to sell the government. He also has a contract for making brick for a new fort about to be put up by the United States. Powers has many friends in Sonora and friends who would perhaps do as much for him as any he ever had in California. And of his whole conduct since he has been here has been most quiet and inoffensive, but little attention is paid to what is said of him in California.

However the truth was that after two years, gambling and running a ranch in the Mexican state of Sonora, in 1860, he drove a herd northward into New Mexico Territory to sell it in Mowry City, a new mining boom town on the Mimbres River. However he found this boom was only a rumor upon reaching the Territory. Then on November 2, 1860, the Daily Alta California reported by telegraph from Los Angeles:

Murder of Jack Powers.

We learn from Mr. R. O. Cossett, who passed here on the Overland mail stage to-day, that the notorious Jack Powers was murdered on his ranch a little south of Tubac, Arizona, by his Mexican peons. He had some seven or eight hundred head of stock on his ranch when he was murdered.

On November 16, 1860, the San Francisco, Daily Evening Bulletin, published a letter from its Arizona correspondent at Fort Buchanan, Arizona, dated October 31, 1860.

Additional Particulars of the Murder of Jack Powers

Some three months ago Jack Powers came up from Sonora with 500 head of cattle, also a lot of sheep and horses. He first stopped on what is known as the Potrero ranch, 4 miles north of the Line. Wishing to find better grass, he moved to the Babacomari ranch (deserted some 40 years ago on account of the Apaches, and belonging to the Spanish family Elias.) Jack came up with 30 Yaqui Indians, who deserted him for fear of the Apaches. While at the Babacomari ranch Capt. Ewell sent him some dragoons until he could get peons to herd his cattle. The Apaches appearing on the ranch, he left for the Potrero ranch, occupied by Montgomery & Smith, and built a house half-a-mile from them, where he settled, with four peons, to herd his cattle. (I forgot to mention that he was on his way to the Rio Mimbres, but on his arrival here, he learned that the mines were a failure, and so he stopped at this point.) On Thursday last [October 25, 1860] Grundy Ake called to see Jack, and asked him if he was not afraid to stop with along with the Mexicans. He answered that his life was safer with Mexicans than Americans.

On Friday night, Montgomery and Smith called at his (Jack's) place, to ask if their (Montgomery & Smith's) hogs had been around. Jack said yes, and wished them to remain over night, as they would be sure to find them in the morning, when they came out of the tules. But Montgomery and Smith said they would come about daylight. On returning in the morning, they found several hogs at the house, and Jack Powers lying on the floor with his throat cut, and skull cracked by a blow on the head. The hogs had badly mangled his body. He was buried on the Sunday, by the farmers living around Calabasas (the U.S. Custom House). Later on the day of the burial, an American, who came up from a small town called Imcorza, met the four peons with a half-breed American (supposed to be Cherokee) on their road down to Sonora. The half-breed was riding Jack's horse. None of the party was leading any animals. It appears that Jack had row with his peons and they killed him, taking all his animals, and everything that was valuable, together with five horses. Mr. Boza of Calabasas, has for the present taken charge of Jack's stock.
