= Carmel Valley AVA =

American Viticultural Area in California

Coordinates: 36°29′08″N 121°43′58″W

Carmel Valley
- Wine region
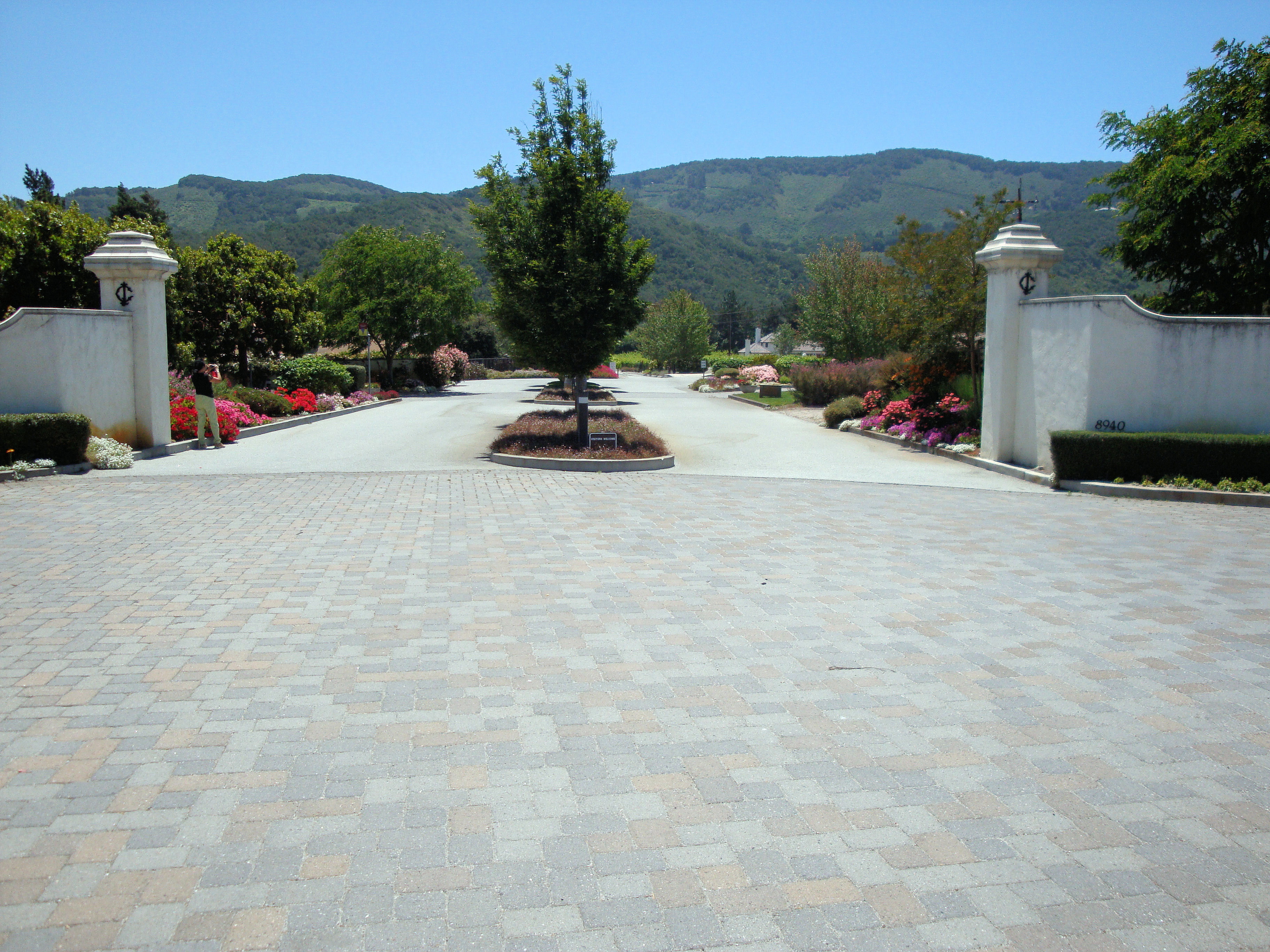
- Château Julien Wine Estate in Carmel Valley
- Type: American Viticultural Area
- Year established: 1983
- Years of wine industry: 156
- Country: United States
- Part of: California, Central Coast AVA, Monterey County
- Other regions in California, Central Coast AVA, Monterey County: Arroyo Seco AVA, Chalone AVA, Hames Valley AVA, Monterey AVA, San Antonio Valley AVA, San Bernabe AVA, San Lucas AVA, Santa Lucia Highlands AVA, Gabilan Mountains AVA
- Growing season: 2317–3085 GDD
- Climate region: Region I and III
- Precipitation (annual average): 16.5 to 22.5 in (419.1 to 571.5 mm)
- Soil conditions: San Andreas Fine Sandy Loam and Arroyo Seco Gravelly Sandy Loam
- Total area: 19,200 acres (30 sq mi)
- Size of planted vineyards: 300 acres (120 ha)
- No. of vineyards: 20
- Grapes produced: Aleatico, Alicante Bouschet, Cabernet Franc, Cabernet Sauvignon, Carignane, Chardonnay, Chenin blanc, Grenache, Malbec, Merlot, Petit Verdot, Petite Sirah, Pinot noir, Sauvignon blanc, Semillon, Syrah, Zinfandel
- No. of wineries: 25

Carmel Valley is an American Viticultural Area (AVA) located in Monterey County, California, southeast of Carmel-by-the-Sea and it is one of the ten AVAs in the county. Approximately 100 miles (161 km) south of San Francisco, the AVA was recognized by the Bureau of Alcohol, Tobacco and Firearms (ATF), Treasury on January 13, 1983, after reviewing the petition submitted by Mr. David Armanasco, General Manager of Durney Vineyard, located in Carmel, to propose a viticultural area named "Carmel Valley."

The appellation is nestled about 5 miles (8 km) inland from the Pacific coast within the towering Santa Lucia Range encompassing over 19,000 acres (30 sq mi) with 300 acres (120 ha) of cultivated grapes on elevations ranging from 203 to 2,762 ft (61.9–841.9 m) above sea level. The AVA is resident to a number of wineries and some vineyards dating back to the 1870s, as well as the town of Carmel Valley Village. Vineyards are predominantly within Carmel Valley and Cacahgua Valley. Bordeaux varietals are popular with Cabernet Sauvignon and Merlot comprising more than 70% of the grapes grown in the area.

== History ==
The Carmel River was discovered in 1603 by Sebastian Vizcaino and the name "Carmel" has applied to the area since that time. The Carmel Valley viticultural area is within the watershed of the Carmel River and within a larger area commonly known by the name Carmel Valley. Grapevines have been grown commercially in Carmel Valley since 1968 though vineyards were first planted in the region in the 1870s.

== Terroir ==
Carmel Valley viticultural area is a rugged region west of Monterey and Pebble Beach extending from the village of Carmel Valley southeasterly along the Carmel River and Cachagua Creek for a distance of approximately 10 miles (16 km). The northeastern boundary is Tularcitos Ridge, which readily distinguishes the area from areas northeast of it by topography and the ridge's effect on the climate of the valley. Southwest of the area is the Los Padres National Forest where agricultural land use is restricted by the U.S. Department of Agriculture. The smaller northwestern and southeastern boundaries are less well defined geographically. Its vineyards are generally situated at elevations above 1,000 feet (300 m) on the mountainous terrain, and are less influenced by the coastal fog and wind which affects the northern end of the Salinas Valley.

=== Climate ===
The Carmel Valley viticultural area is distinguished from the surrounding area by climate and soil types. Utilizing the Amerine-Winkler method, Carmel Valley has different cumulative heat summation during the grape growing season than nearby areas, as follows: Carmel Valley 2317 degree-days (Region I), Salinas Valley 2148 degree-days (Region I), King City 3085 degree-days (Region III). Although Carmel Valley and nearby Salinas Valley are both Region I heat summation areas, the higher elevations in Carmel Valley, where vineyards are situated above 1,000 feet (300 m), curbs the marine fog incursion producing more sunny days in Carmel Valley than in Salinas Valley at the southern end. This phenomenon distinguishes the area from the surrounding AVAs. Cachagua Valley's unique mountainous setting sits high above the fog line along the coast and exposes the grapes to a warmer overall climate. Average summer temperatures can reach into the 100s with cool evenings dropping into the low 30s and 40s. This dramatic swing in temperature extends the ripening time and growing season, allowing the grapes a slow maturation process. Carmel Valley's normal annual precipitation ranges from 16.5 to 22.5 inches (420 to 570 mm) distinguishes it from Monterey County's overall normal annual precipitation of 10 inches (250 mm).

=== Soil ===
Carmel Valley soils are significantly different from the surrounding area and particularly well-suited to viticulture. It is composed of various mixtures of coarse, gravelly and fine sandy and clay loams forming a complex aggregate throughout the region. The soil variations are as follows:

- San Benito (SdF) clay loam, 30–50% slopes
- San Benito (SdG) clay loam, 50–75% slopes
- Junípero (JaF) loamy sand, 30–50% slopes
- Junípero (JbG) sandy loam, 30–75% slopes
- Junipero-Sur (Jc) complex, 50–85% slopes
- Santa Lucia (SfF) shaly clay loam, 30–50% slopes
- Cieneba (CcG) fine gravelly sandy loam, 30–70% slopes
- San Andreas (SgC) fine sandy loam, 30–75% slopes
- Sheridan (SoG) coarse sandy loam, 30–75% slopes
- Santa Lucia-Reliz Association (Sg) loamy and shallow loamy complex, 30–75% slopes.

These soil mixes and terrain provides ideal drainage and allows for optimal airflow through the root system requiring minimal amounts of supplemental irrigation producing healthy, vibrant grapes.

== Industry ==
Wineries with tasting rooms in Carmel Valley include Bernardus, Boëté, Boekenoogen, Chateau Sinnet, Folktale Winery and Vineyards, Galante, Georis, Joyce Vineyards, Holman Ranch, Joullian Vineyards, Massa Estate (formerly Heller Estate and Durney Vineyards) and Talbott. The Monterey-Salinas Transit Route 24 public bus, named the Grapevine Express, runs through the Carmel Valley stopping at most of the tasting rooms. County Route G16 traverses through the valley while the Carmel River flows on the valley floor. The vineyards in the region are mostly located at 1,000 feet (305 m) above sea level or higher.

== See also ==
- California wine
