= Bernabe =

Bernabe may refer to:

== Persons ==
- Bernabe (given name)
- Bernabe (surname)

== Places ==
- San Bernabe AVA, California wine region in Monterey County

== See also ==
- Barnabas
- Barnabe (disambiguation)
- Barnaby
- Barnabé
- Barney (disambiguation)
- Bernabé (disambiguation)
- Bernabei
