= San Antonio Valley AVA =

Appellation that designates wine in Monterey County, CA

Coordinates: 35.90946°N 121.01826°W

San Antonio Valley
- Wine region
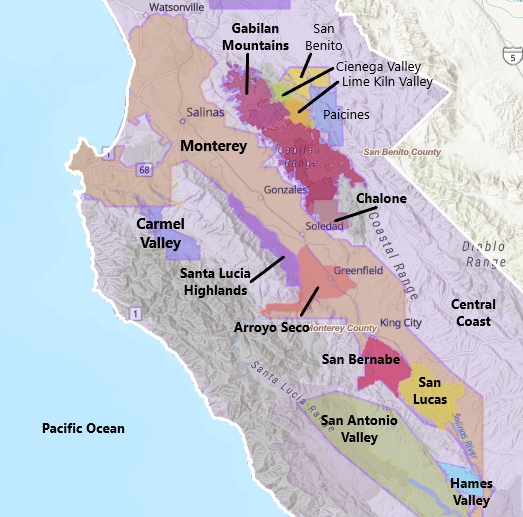
- Monterey County's AVAS
- Type: American Viticultural Area
- Year established: 2006
- Years of wine industry: 255
- Country: United States
- Part of: California, Central Coast AVA, Monterey County
- Other regions in California, Central Coast AVA, Monterey County: Carmel Valley AVA, Chalone AVA, Monterey AVA, Gabilan Mountains AVA, Hames Valley AVA, Arroyo Seco AVA, San Bernabe AVA, San Lucas AVA, Santa Lucia Highlands AVA
- Growing season: 251 days
- Climate region: Region III-IV
- Heat units: 3,000+ GDD units
- Precipitation (annual average): 14 to 15 in (360–380 mm)
- Soil conditions: Arbuckle gravelly loam, Chamise shaly loam, Lockwood loam and shaly loam, Placentia sandy loam, Placentia-Arbuckle complex, Rincon clay loam, Nacimiento silty clay loam, and Pinnacles coarse sandy loam
- Total area: 150,400 acres (235 sq mi)
- Size of planted vineyards: 800 acres (320 ha)
- No. of vineyards: 10
- Grapes produced: Albarino, Cabernet Franc, Cabernet Sauvignon, Grenache, Marsanne, Petit Verdot, Petite Sirah, Roussanne, Sauvignon Blanc, Syrah/Shiraz, Tempranillo/Valdepenas, Zinfandel
- Varietals produced: 20
- No. of wineries: 10

San Antonio Valley is an American Viticultural Area (AVA) in southwestern Monterey County, California, located in the San Antonio Valley landform situated in the Santa Lucia mountain range about 15 miles (24 km) inland from the Pacific coast. It was established as the nation's 173^{rd}, the state's 97^{th} and county's ninth appellation on June 8, 2006 by the Alcohol and Tobacco Tax and Trade Bureau (TTB), Treasury after reviewing the petition submitted by Paul Getzelman, Paula Getzelman, and Steve Cobb of Lockwood, California, proposing a viticultural area in Monterey County known as "San Antonio Valley."

The area lies entirely within the existing multi-county Central Coast viticultural area encompasses approximately 150,400 acres (235 sq mi) of flat land and gently rolling hills extending to the surrounding hillsides that rise to an elevation of approximately 2,200 feet (670 m). The valley, formed by the watershed of the San Antonio River, is situated in the Santa Lucia Range between the Pacific coast and the Salinas Valley. The San Antonio River flows across the Santa Lucia range in a southeasterly direction, then turns to the east and flows into the Salinas River. The San Antonio Dam, built in the 1960s on the river near the San Luis Obispo county line, created Lake San Antonio, which dominates the southeastern corner of the San Antonio Valley viticultural area. The AVA shares its typical warm climate with the Salinas Valley, bordered to the east, benefiting from the cooling effects of Lake San Antonio and the Pacific Ocean. Currently, over 800 acres (320 ha) of vinifera grapes and more than 20 varietals are under cultivation in San Antonio Valley. With an elevation ranging from 580 to 2,800 ft (180–850 m), this region experiences warm, dry conditions. Its climate is similar to the nearby Paso Robles AVA and the soils found here are primarily gravelly loam and clay. Taken together, these elements provide an excellent setting for growing full-bodied Rhône and Bordeaux varietals from Cabernet Sauvingon and Petite Sirah to Syrah and Marsanne.

== History ==
The name "San Antonio Valley" dates back to 1771, when a small party of Spanish missionaries headed by Father Junipero Serra entered the oak-mantled valley in what was to become southern Monterey County. Near the river that was christened "El Rio de San Antonio," Serra established a mission and named it "San Antonio de Padua" in honor of Saint Anthony of Padua. They later moved the mission to a location a couple of miles north at the confluence of the San Miguel and San Antonio Rivers, which provided the missionaries a more suitable place to plant grape vines for making sacramental wine for the Mission. Today, the mission remains as lasting reminder of the district's earliest viticulture.

== Terroir ==
=== Topography ===
The San Antonio Valley's basin topography, soil and climate contribute to significantly different growing conditions from those found in the adjoining areas within the extensive Central Coast viticultural area. The petitioners note that the Spanish missionaries were the first to recognize the valley's unique grape growing conditions. This viewpoint is reflected in the Pelican Network Guide, which states: "The Spaniards, who liked the site for wine making because of its soil and climate, were right on the money." The elevation of San Antonio Valley ranges from 850 to 2,530 feet (260–770 m) surrounded by the higher Santa Lucia range to the west and south and a lower ridge averaging 1,500 feet (460 m) in elevation to the north and east. The shape and elevation of the area results in higher daytime and lower nighttime temperatures than in neighboring areas with lower elevations, such as the Monterey viticultural area where the elevation ranges from 50 to 540 feet (15–165 m). The daily heating-cooling cycle produced by the AVA's higher elevation means that intense sunlight during the day is followed by much colder nights and mornings which allows grapes to achieve full, rich fruit flavor and color while retaining a crisp acidity."/>

=== Climate ===
The San Antonio Valley's climate is much less affected by marine air than other areas of the Central Coast. A stable layer of marine air typically dominates coastal California weather causing higher humidity, cooler maximum temperatures, and warmer minimum temperatures. This effect occurs with greater duration in valleys close to the coast, such as Carmel Valley, Edna Valley, Santa Ynez Valley, and the lower Salinas Valley. Its influence decreases as one travels inland, especially in the upper areas of the Salinas Valley. The inland position of the San Antonio Valley and its basin shape act to block the intrusion of this marine air. Only when the upper level of atmospheric pressure allows the layer of marine air to expand to greater than its typical depth of 1,000 to 1,500 feet (300–460 m) does the San Antonio Valley experience a marine air influence. This lack of a marine air influence creates a unique microclimate for the area, with drier, hotter days in summer and cooler nights in the spring and fall.
As evidence of this climatic distinction, the petition submitted temperature comparisons based on data from the National Weather Center. A comparison of growing season average monthly temperatures between San Antonio Valley and nearby areas (Carmel Valley Gonzales, Arroyo Seco King City and Paso Robles) shows that San Antonio Valley is considerably cooler than the other areas during April. This also cause the San Antonio Valley to experience more frequent frost episodes. However, from June through September the viticultural area averages warmer temperatures than the other areas, with the exception of Paso Robles which is further inland than the San Antonio Valley. This diurnal temperature shift ensures that grapes are given a cooling-off period each day, extending the growing season and allowing for the development of rich fruit characters in the grapes without sacrificing acidity.

San Antonio Valley typically accumulates more than 3,000 degree days during the growing season. Paso Robles accumulates 3,600 degree days for the same period, while Carmel Valley, Gonzales, and Arroyo Seco all accumulate fewer than 2,400 degree days each. King City accumulates roughly as many degree days for the growing season as San Antonio Valley. However, the monthly comparison shows that in King City the degree days accumulate steadily through the months, while in the San Antonio Valley the increase and decrease in degree days is much more dramatic, with most of the increase occurring during the summer months. (A measurement of heat accumulation during the growing season, one degree day accumulates for each degree Fahrenheit that a day's mean temperature is above 50 degrees, which is the minimum temperature required for grapevine growth. In addition to the temperature comparisons described above, the petitioners also submitted a microclimate comparison of the San Antonio Valley viticultural area and two adjacent existing viticultural areas, Paso Robles and Hames Valley, respectively. The data covered a two-week period from September 16 to 29, 2003, and was collected at sites located on the Fort Hunter Liggett Military Reservation within the viticultural area, at Bradley in the Hames Valley viticultural area, and at the Paso Robles Airport within the Paso Robles viticultural area. The petitioners submitted the data in the form of graphs exhibiting differences in temperature, dew point, humidity, and wind speeds between the three areas. According to the graphs, wind speeds for the period were significantly lower in San Antonio Valley than in Hames Valley or Paso Robles. The petitioners state that this is because the topography of the proposed viticultural area blocks the strongest daily afternoon winds created by marine air influence. Dew points for the period were shown to be at least 10 degrees lower in the proposed San Antonio Valley viticultural area than in the other viticultural areas, reflecting the proposed viticultural area's lower humidity. The temperature data, according to the petitioners, shows that the proposed San Antonio Valley viticultural area also has a temperature profile that differs markedly from that of the Hames Valley or Paso Robles viticultural areas. Generally, this data shows that the proposed area is less affected by marine air intrusions. The petitioners note that during times of marine air influence, the proposed San Antonio Valley viticultural area has a much greater temperature variance than the two existing viticultural areas where the marine air moderates the temperatures. They also note that on days with little marine air influence, the proposed area experiences less temperature variation than the two existing areas. Thus, the data shows the climate in the San Antonio Valley viticultural area to be significantly different in regard to temperature, wind, humidity, and degree day accumulations from surrounding existing viticultural areas. These differences, they contend, are a reflection of the area's basin geography, making the grape growing environment in the San Antonio Valley viticultural area unique relative to other Central Coast viticultural areas.

=== Soil ===
The San Antonio Valley has a distinctive soil profile composed of nearly 40 different soil series, the majority of them alluvial in nature, deposited over time by the San Antonio River. The remaining soils found in the uplands consist of material from weathered sandstone and shale loam that is free-draining and fairly deep in parts. Current vineyards are planted on flat to moderately sloping terrain. The principal soil series are Arbuckle gravelly loam, Chamise shaly loam, Lockwood loam and shaly loam, Placentia sandy loam, Placentia-Arbuckle complex, Rincon clay loam, Nacimiento silty clay loam, and Pinnacles coarse sandy loam. The submitted soil data for the area came from "Soil Survey of Monterey County, California," published by the Soil Conservation Service of the U.S. Department of Agriculture. These soils differ from the soils of neighboring areas of Monterey County. In the San Bernabe viticultural area, for example, the soils, remnants of ancient sand dunes, are mostly of the eolian type. The adjacent Hames Valley viticultural area has a very homogeneous soil profile with 75 percent of the soils derived from the Lockwood series.

== Viticulture Industry ==
Paul Getzelman, Paula Getzelman, and Steve Cobb of Lockwood, California, petitioned TTB to establish the "San Antonio Valley" viticultural area in southwestern Monterey County, California, in a valley situated in the Santa Lucia mountain range. Because of the optimal climate and soil conditions, the valley produces exceptional Rhone and Bordeaux varietals, such as Cabernet Sauvignon, Cabernet Franc and Syrah. These, according to Elsbeth Wetherill of Escafeld Vineyards help "complete Monterey County's ever-expanding pouring table".
