= River Road Wine Trail =

Tourist attraction in Monterey County, CA

Coordinates: 36°30′37″N 121°30′57″W

County Road G17
- Arroyo Seco Road, Fort Romie Road, River Road, Reservation Road

Route information
- Length: 44.9 mi (72.3 km)
- Existed: 1965–present
- Tourist routes: River Road Wine Trail

Major junctions
- From: CR G16 Elm Avenue, Arroyo Seco Road south
- To: SR 1

Location
- Country: United States
- State: California
- County: Monterey

Highway system
- County routes in California

The River Road Wine Trail is a Salinas Valley wine-tasting route following River Road (County Route G17) along the western banks of the Salinas River. It is not to be misidentified with the Great River Road that traverses along the banks of the Mississippi River through multiple states. The road also designates the eastern boundary of the Santa Lucia Highlands AVA and accesses many of the resident wineries contributing to local enotourism business. Due to its popularity, it is notably referenced in numerous books and magazines.

== History ==
River Road traces along the banks of the Salinas River on a north-south axis since its construction in 1955 predating the wineries and viticultural industry by decades. It was designated as signed County Route “G17” in 1965. Since 1992, it traverses the entire length of Santa Lucia Highlands AVA outlining its eastern boundary with the Monterey AVA. The earliest grape plantings in the region, however, were in the 1790s, with the arrival of the Spanish missions in California. The arrival of commercial wineries, and enotourism, began in the early 1970s, with initial plantings by Smith at Paraiso, by McFarland at Sleepy Hollow, by Johnson at La Estancia, and by Hahn at Smith & Hook. In 2013, Monterey County was designated by Wine Enthusiast magazine as one of the world's Top 10 Wine Travel Destinations with New York and Oregon being the other North American locations.

== Enotourism ==
Wine tourism has expanded in Monterey County as the number of wineries within the region. The hot climate of the Salinas Valley produces good Syrahs and the foggy nights are ideal for Chardonnay, Pinot Noir and other cool-climate varietals. Currently there are at least 24 wineries in the Salinas Valley with at least 13 tasting rooms along River Road, going from Salinas south to Greenfield. They are perched on the eastern flank of the Santa Lucia Highlands with great views overlooking fertile valley farmlands.

The River Road Wine Trail features wineries from three distinct growing regions: Monterey, Arroyo Seco and the Santa Lucia Highlands. The wineries are accessible by driving south on River Road from the Highway 68 intersection where it crosses the Salinas River. From the river crossing, some of the wineries and distances are tabulated below:

- Odonata Wines • 645 River Road, Salinas – 7 mi (11 km)
- Rustique Wines • 1010 River Road, Salinas – 10 mi (16 km)
- .Pessagno Wines • 1645 River Rd, Salinas – 16 mi (26 km).
- .Manzoni Wines • 30981 River Road, Soledad – 17 mi (27 km)
- Puma Road Winery • 32720 River Road, Soledad – 23 mi (37 km)
- Wrath Wines • 35801 Foothill Road, Soledad – 24 mi (39 km)
- Hahn Wines • 37700 Foothill Road, Soledad – 26 mi (42 km)
- Smith Family Wines • 38060 Paraiso Springs Road, Soledad – 31 mi (50 km)
- Joyce Winery • 38740 Los Coches Road, Soledad – 35 mi (56 km).

== Carmel Valley Wine Trail ==
At the end of the River Road Wine Trail is the start of another wine trail. At Greenfield, if one takes the Arroyo Seco Road westward, it branches into the Carmel Valley Road (G16) from which one can then take the Carmel Valley Wine Trail northwards, passing through Carmel Valley Village and ending at the coastal city of Carmel.
