= Barnaby (disambiguation) =

Barnaby is a masculine given name and a surname.

Barnaby may also refer to:

- Barnaby, New Brunswick, Canada, a community
- Barnaby River, in New Brunswick, Canada
- Barnaby Records, an American record company
- Barnaby (comics), American comic strip

== See also ==
- St Barnaby's thistle (Centaurea solstitialis), plant
- Barnabas
- Barnabe (disambiguation)
- Barnabé
- Barney (disambiguation)
- Bernabe (disambiguation)
- Bernabé (disambiguation)
- Burnaby (disambiguation)
