= Bernabe (surname) =

Bernabe or Bernabé is a surname.

Those bearing it include:

- Adrián Bernabé (born 2001), Spanish football player
- Antonio Valero de Bernabé (1790–1863), Puerto Rico-born Spanish soldier
- Paulino Bernabe (disambiguation)
