= Bernabé =

Bernabé may refer to:

== People ==
=== As a given name ===
- Bernabé Ballester (born 1982), Spanish footballer
- Bernabé Barragán (born 1993), Spanish footballer
- Bernabé Cobo, (1582–1657), Spanish Jesuit missionary and writer
- Bernabé Ferreyra (1909–1972), Argentine footballer
- Bernabé Ndaki, Gabonese politician
- Bernabé "Berny" Peña, (born 1980) Costa Rican footballer
- Bernabé Ramos y Miranda, Governor of Melila 1688-1691
- Bernabé Williams also known as Bernie, (born 1968) former Major League Baseball outfielder

=== As a surname ===
- Adrián Bernabé (born 2001), Spanish footballer
- Ángel Bernabé, (born 1987), Spanish footballer
- Franco Bernabè (born 1948), Italian banker
- Jean Bernabé (1942–2017), Martinican writer and linguist
- Mònica Bernabé (born 1972), Spanish journalist
- Pascal Bernabé, (born 1942) French SCUBA diver

== Places ==
- San Bernabé (Monterrey Metro)

== See also ==
- Barnabas
- Barnaby (disambiguation)
- Bernabei (disambiguation)
