= Barnabé =

Barnabé is both a surname and a given name. Notable people with the name include:

== Persons ==
- Arrigo Barnabé (born 1951), Brazilian musician and actor
- Barnabé Brisson (1531–1591), French jurist and politician
- Barnabé Brisson (engineer) (1777–1828)
- Barnabe (artist) French artist

== Arts and entertainment ==
- Barnabé (film), a 1938 French comedy film

== See also ==
- Barnabe (disambiguation)
- Barnaby (disambiguation)
- Saint-Barnabé
