= Monterey County wine =

Appellation that designates wine in Monterey County, CA

Coordinates: 36°26′00″N 121°25′09″W

- Wine region
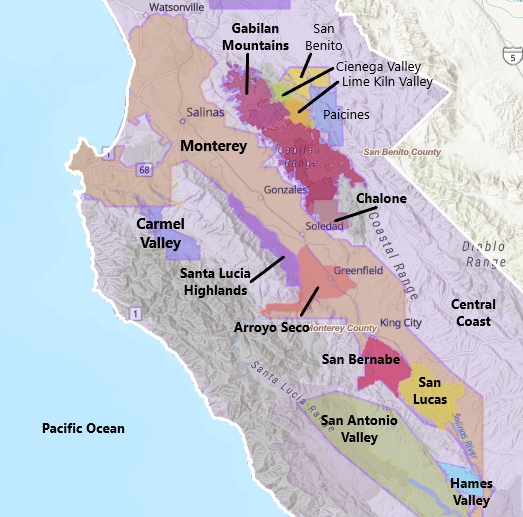
- Monterey County's AVAS
- Type: U.S. County Appellation
- Year established: 1850
- Years of wine industry: 256
- Country: United States
- Part of: California, Central Coast AVA
- Other regions in California, Central Coast AVA: San Luis Obispo County, Santa Barbara County
- Sub-regions: Carmel Valley AVA, Chalone AVA, San Antonio Valley AVA, Monterey AVA, Hames Valley AVA, Arroyo Seco AVA, San Bernabe AVA, San Lucas AVA, Santa Lucia Highlands AVA, Gabilan Mountains AVA
- Climate region: Region I, II, III, IV
- Total area: 2,100,480 acres (3,282 sq mi)
- Size of planted vineyards: 69,000 acres (28,000 ha)
- No. of vineyards: over 349
- Grapes produced: Albarino, Alvarelhao, Cabernet Sauvignon, Chardonnay, Chenin blanc, Gewurztraminer, Grenache, Malbec, Malvasia, Merlot, Orange Muscat, Petite Sirah, Pinot blanc, Pinot gris, Pinot noir, Riesling, Roussanne, Sangiovese, Sauvignon blanc, Semillon, Souzao, Syrah, Tannat, Tinta Cao, Touriga Nacional, Valdiguie, Viognier, Zinfandel
- Varietals produced: 53
- No. of wineries: 76

Monterey County wine is a appellation that designates wine made from grapes grown in Monterey County, California which lies entirely within the expansive multi-county Central Coast viticultural area. County names in the United States automatically qualify as legal appellations of origin for wine produced from grapes grown in that county and do not require registration with the Alcohol and Tobacco Tax and Trade Bureau (TTB). TTB was created in January 2003, when the Bureau of Alcohol, Tobacco and Firearms, or ATF, was extensively reorganized under the provisions of the Homeland Security Act of 2002.

Monterey County is situated within the California Coast Ranges. The Pacific Coast Highway (PCH) runs through the county along the coast. Viticulture is supported by fertile soils and the maritime California climate. The shape of the valley allows the cool coastal air to move inland, contributing to the valley's unique wines. The terrain, climate, and soil create unique microclimates throughout the county for a vibrant viticulture economy.

This historic region is one of the popular bastions of cool-climate viticulture because of its proximity to the Pacific coast. The majority of Monterey's cultivated 69,000 acres (27,923 ha) resides in the 80 miles (129 km) elongated, fertile Salinas Valley framed by the central inner Coastal Range, continuously defined on a southeast to northwest axis by the Santa Lucia Range to the west and the Gabilan Range along its eastern boundary. As of 2024, the county is resident to ten established American Viticultural Areas (AVA), each with distinct viticultural personalities. They are Chalone, Arroyo Seco, San Lucas, Santa Lucia Highlands, San Bernabe, Hames Valley, Carmel Valley, San Antonio Valley, Gabilan Mountains and the large Monterey viticultural areas.

== History ==
"Monterey" is the name of a peninsula, a city, a bay, and county with a rich history. The county name was adopted in 1848. Although, the name "Monterey" originated in the Americas during the days of Spanish rule. In 1602, explorer Sebastian Vizcaino named the bay in honor of Condado de Monterrey, Spanish viceroy of Mexico. During 1770, the Spanish established the Presidio of Monterey and Franciscan Friar Junípero Serra founded Mission San Antonio de Padua, Mission Soledad and Mission San Carlos Borromeo de Carmelo whose present-day Monterey County locales are respectively Jolon, Soledad and Monterey. The same year, vitis vinifera were planted at the mission in Monterey and subsequent years at the missions in Jolon and Soledad. In May 1771, Father Serra relocated the Monterey mission to land near the mouth of the Carmel River because it was better suited for farming. Monterey was named the capital of Alta California in 1775 and was fortified, becoming a major port of entry and center of Spanish culture in the "New World".

Despite conflicting accounts, the first recorded New World vineyard was probably in 1683 by the Spanish Jesuit missionary Eusebio Francisco Kino, at Misión San Bruno in Baja California, planting the first variety named "Misionéro." These grapevines, Vitis vinifera, were originally transported by ship from Spain to Mexico around the year 1540 and cuttings were planted throughout Mexico and spread north with Spanish explorers in the 1620s. Cuttings were later planted in 1769 at the site of the first mission founded in San Diego and became known as "Mission grapes" dominating California wine production until about 1880. In 1779, Franciscan missionaries, under the direction of the Father Junípero Serra, established Alta California's first vineyard and winery at Mission San Juan Capistrano. Both red and white wines (sweet and dry), brandy, and a port-like wine called Angelica were all produced from the Mission grape. The mission's historical journals document that between May 1779 and 1781, the padres supervised six 'campesinos' from Baja California in planting 2,000 grapevines at the mission. Father Serra founded eight California missions, hence, he has been called the "Father of California Wine."

In 1919, French immigrant and entrepreneur, Charles Tamm, traveled through California searching for the terroir with limestone soil similar to his native Burgundy. He found a property in southern Monterey County on the north slope of Chalone Peak which is currently Chalone Vineyards. On the limestone-based elevated 1,800 feet (550 m) topography, Tamm planted Chenin Blanc sourcing for wineries even during Prohibition, when the grapes were used to make sacramental wines. Winegrowing, however, never became important in Monterey County because it was considered a "poor area" for viticulture. Strong winds off Monterey Bay and the arid, climate of the Salinas River Valley deterred the planting of wine grapes. During Prohibition, only 400 acres (162 ha) of vineyards in Monterey County survived and this acreage was halved in the years following Repeal. Later, Chalone Vineyard grew and its grapes were sold in the 1940s and '50s to Almaden Vineyards and Wente Brothers. In 1946, Chalone vineyards was expanded by its subsequent owner, William Silvear, with more Chardonnay and Chenin Blanc plus newly planted Pinot Blanc and Pinot Noir.

In the early 1960s, the modern era of viticulture took root and Monterey County gained prominence as a wine-producing region. By the late 1960s and early 1970s, the quality of some California wines was outstanding but few took notice as the market favored French brands. At the legendary Judgement of Paris on 24 May 1976, Chalone Vineyard's 1974 Chardonnay ranked 3rd in the white wine category scored by renown French oenophiles. The identical vintage ranked 1st in a repeat event at the San Francisco Wine Tasting of 1978. During the 1982 Monterey AVA petition review, there were approximately 36,000 acres (15,000 ha) devoted to viticulture, 14 registered wineries, a 15th under construction, and three proposed viticultural areas, namely, Arroyo Seco, Carmel Valley and Chalone. In addition to the petition for the Monterey viticultural area, ATF received petitions for the establishment of viticultural areas to be "King City" and "San Lucas." Monterey AVA's proposed boundaries encompassed 640,000 acres (1,000 sq mi) where 35,758 acres (14,471 ha), approximately 5.5 percent, were devoted to viticulture. Since the 1982 TTB recognition of Chalone, the county's first established viticultural area, Monterey County established ten AVAs with over 69,000 acres (27,923 ha) under vine and a world-class viticulture reputation.

== Monterey County Viticultural Areas _{(as of 2025)} ==
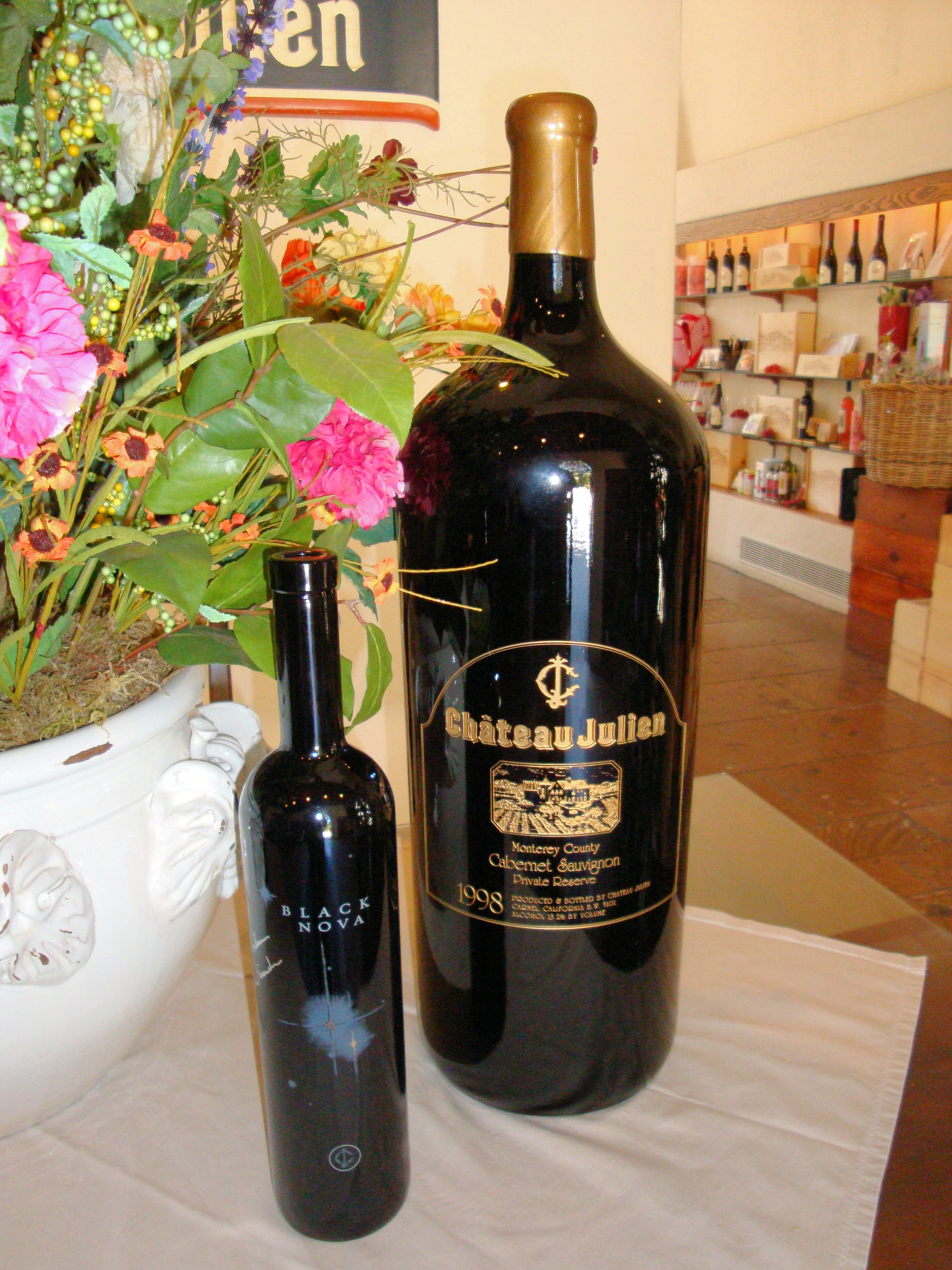

- Carmel Valley (Est. Jan 1983, 19,200 acres (30 sq mi)
- Monterey (Est. Jul 1984, 640,000 acres (1,000 sq mi))
  - Arroyo Seco (Est. May 1983, 18,240 acres (29 sq mi))
  - San Lucas (Est. Mar 1987, 33,920 acres (53 sq mi))
  - Santa Lucia Highlands (Est. Jun 1992, 22,000 acres (34 sq mi))
  - San Bernabe (Est. Aug 2004, 24,796 acres (39 sq mi))
- Hames Valley (Est. Apr 1994, 10,240 acres (16 sq mi))
- San Antonio Valley (Est. Jul 2006, 150,400 acres (235 sq mi))
- Gabilan Mountains (Est. Sep 2022, 98,000 acres (153 sq mi), Monterey and San Benito counties)
  - Chalone (Est. Jul 1982, 8,640 acres (14 sq mi), Monterey and San Benito counties)

== Terroir ==
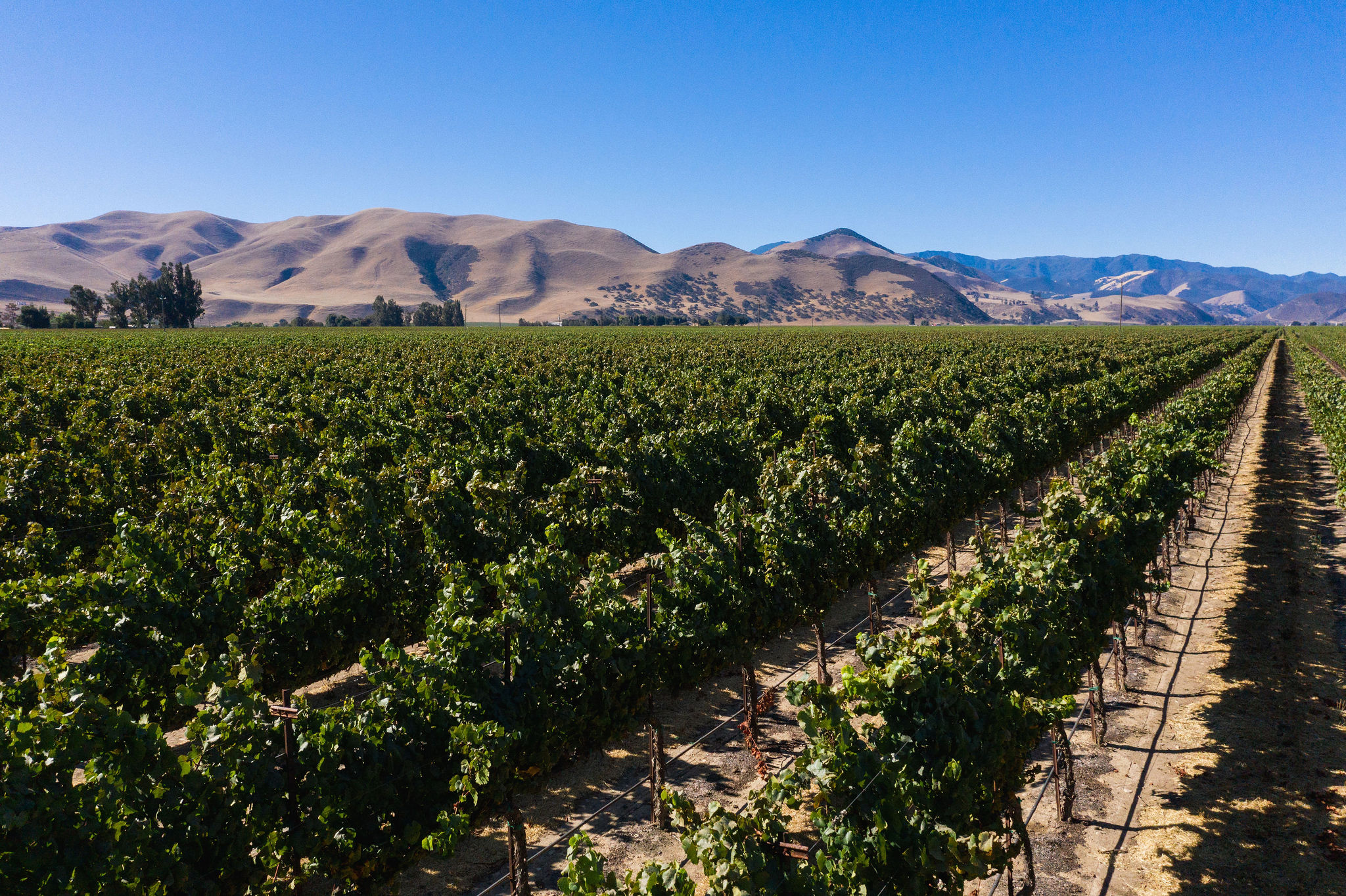
Arroyo Seco vineyard

Monterey County is distinguished by the composition of its soils, elevation, topography, and the marine influences from the Pacific Ocean, specifically, wind, rainfall, fog and climatic variances. Its numerous valley floors are flat and several miles wide with multiple elevated slopes creating an ideal topography for viticulture. The Monterey AVA is the largest in the county, with over 640,000 acres (1,000 sq mi) extending the entire length of the county. Because it covers so much terrain, it has diverse micro-climates which translates to exceptional grape diversity from the southern shores of Monterey Bay to the expansive river valley between the Gabilan and Sierra de Salinas mountains forming a natural funnel, drawing cool marine air inland from the coast. Fog and the maritime breezes are a vital part of the Monterey terroir, just as they are further north in Napa and Sonoma valleys. The Salinas River is the state's largest in the Central Coast geologically creating the fluvial valley and is vital for various methods of agricultural irrigation by growers in the area. Chardonnay reigns supreme throughout the region, accounting for over 50% of vines in production.

The Monterey viticultural area is distinguished from surrounding areas by the composition of its soils, elevation above sea level, and the marine influences from the Pacific Ocean, specifically, wind, rainfall, fog and climatic variances. The area is relatively dry throughout the growing season where average annual rainfall in the valleys is 10 inches (250 mm). However, the watersheds of the Santa Lucia, Gabilan, and Diablo ranges provide adequate water through underground aquifers to enable irrigation of the grape acreage as well as to satisfy other agricultural requirements. During the growing season, the rainfall is lower in the Monterey viticultural area than in surrounding areas. This necessitates the use by grape growers of various methods of irrigation. The inland valleys which open to the Pacific Ocean between the parallel mountain ranges (Gabilan, Santa Lucia, and Diablo) form corridors of cool air which contributes to a longer growing season than surrounding areas. Unlike neighboring highlands above the 1,000 feet (300 m) contour line, the land within the viticultural area is subjected to variable winds which sweep inland in a southeasterly direction from Monterey Bay through the Carmel and Salinas River valleys. The higher afternoon temperatures in the inland reaches the viticultural area and beyond create air drainage which draws the relatively cooler air from the Monterey Bay down through the valleys of the viticultural area to replenish the hot air rising from the inland areas.

The major climatic influences are the Pacific Ocean and Monterey Bay. To the west, the Santa Lucas Mountains block damaging Pacific rains from the area. However, winds off Monterey Bay blow down the Salinas River, cooling the valley and providing a moderate climate. The cooling effects of the wind make the northern Salinas Valley quite cold. Gonzales is classified as Region I with 2350 degree days. In the Arroyo Seco area, the climate is considered Region II. Soledad to the immediate north, registers 2880 degree days while Wente's Arroyo Seco Vineyards average between 1875 and 2250 degree days. The cooling effect of the wind diminishes further south. King City averages 3150 degree days, placing it in Region III while San Miguel is classified as Region IV. Temperatures are rarely extreme enough to cause serious problems of frost or heat as in neighboring grape-growing areas.

The elevation of the San Antonio Valley viticultural area ranges from 850 to 2,530 feet (260–770 m). This area is surrounded by the higher Santa Lucia range to the west and south and a lower ridge averaging 1,500 feet (460 m) elevation to the north and east. According to the petitioners, the shape and elevation of San Antonio Valley results in higher daytime and lower nighttime temperatures than in neighboring areas with lower elevations, such as the Monterey viticultural area where the elevation ranges from 50 to 540 feet (15–165 m). The ridge top of the Gabilan Range forms the eastern boundary between San Benito County and Monterey County. Little coastal air passes east of this mountain range and the area to the east of the range have little of the coastal influences of moderating temperature and rainfall. San Benito County has spring frosts occurring two to four weeks later, fall frosts occurring one to six weeks earlier, and hot spells lasting one to three days longer than in Monterey County.

The newly established Gabilan Mountains AVA is located in the Gabilan Range where the average elevation is the highest in the county at 2,370 feet (722 m). By contrast, to the north, the average elevation in neighboring Santa Clara Valley AVA is 345 feet (105 m). The average elevation within the established Arroyo Seco AVA, to the south, is 331 feet (101 m). To the east of Gabilan Mountains in San Benito County, the average elevation ranges from 778 feet (237 m) within the Paicines AVA to 1,105 feet (337 m) within the Cienega Valley AVA. In Monterey AVA, to the west of Gabilan, the average elevation ranges from 480 to 512 feet (146–156 m) within the Santa Lucia Highlands AVA. The higher elevations of Gabilan Mountains place it above the heavy fog and marine layer. As a result, it maintains a cool climate without the humidity from the fog and low-lying clouds. The lower humidity levels significantly reduce mildew pressure which allows growers to use less fungicide and pursue more organic practices during the growing season. TTB determined the previously established Mt. Harlan and Chalone AVAs will remain as sub-AVAs within the new Gabilan Mountains AVA. All three AVAs are high elevation regions that experience less marine fog than the lower neighboring regions. Like the Gabilan Mountains, the Mt. Harlan area contains soils of the Sheridan, Cieneba, and Auberry series, and the Chalone soils contain large amounts of calcium derived from limestone. However, Mt. Harlan and Chalone also have distinct characteristics that distinguish themselves from the Gabilan Mountains which justifies their AVA-identities within a larger AVA.

Portions of the Carmel and Salinas River valleys within the boundary of Monterey viticultural area share unique climatic features which distinguish Monterey County from other California grape-growing regions. These features include a long period from bloom to harvest, mild daily high temperatures during most of the fruit development period, fog in the morning (in the northern portions of the viticultural area), a quick rise to the daily maximum temperature with a simultaneous precipitous drop in humidity and regularly occurring southeasterly winds from the Pacific Ocean beginning in the early afternoon. The high temperatures common to the Central San Joaquin Valley are rare in the Monterey viticultural area but do occur during the Indian summer period. Weather records from Gonzales, Soledad, Greenfield, and King City all show a high degree of similarity in temperatures within the area. Comparisons to weather records from neighboring grape-growing areas show that the combination of morning fog and afternoon wind produces a unique temperature and relative humidity pattern.

During the Monterey AVA 1982 review, Monterey Winegrowers Council, the petitioner for the viticultural area, summarized the views of its membership and endorsed the basis that geographical features and not existing planting distributions should determine the proposed boundaries. They agreed with ATF's proposal to exclude the established Chalone viticultural area on the basis that its elevation placed it in a different climate zone. ATF also found that the Carmel Valley viticultural area features were similar to the Chalone viticultural area than to those distinguishing grapes grown in the generally lowland Monterey area. These comments were best summarized in the statement of one commenter that "when comparing grape growing areas within the proposed Monterey viticultural area, several areas possess micro-climatological and mino-geological characteristics that offer subtle influences on grape growing practices." ATF found that it is consistent with established agency policy pertaining to the establishment of boundaries for viticultural areas to include sub-areas having minor differences in climate and geology.

Limestone is the predominant component of the soils in the county's highland areas and the lower valley areas' soils are generally light textured loam to loamy sands varying in reaction from pH 5.1 to 8.4 and having low salinity. The soils are generally low in organic matter and naturally supplied nitrogen and require irrigation in the summer months.

Cooler weather, ocean breezes, and fog characterize the northern section of the Monterey County, produces cool-climate grapes like Riesling and Pinot Noir. In the southern areas, the terrain expands into the Salinas Valley where daytime temperatures can reach up to 100 °F (38 °C). The warmer climate produces Bourdeaux varietals (Cabernet Sauvignon and Merlot), Rhone varietals (Syrah and Petite Sirah), and some Zinfandel.

== Viticulture Innovations ==
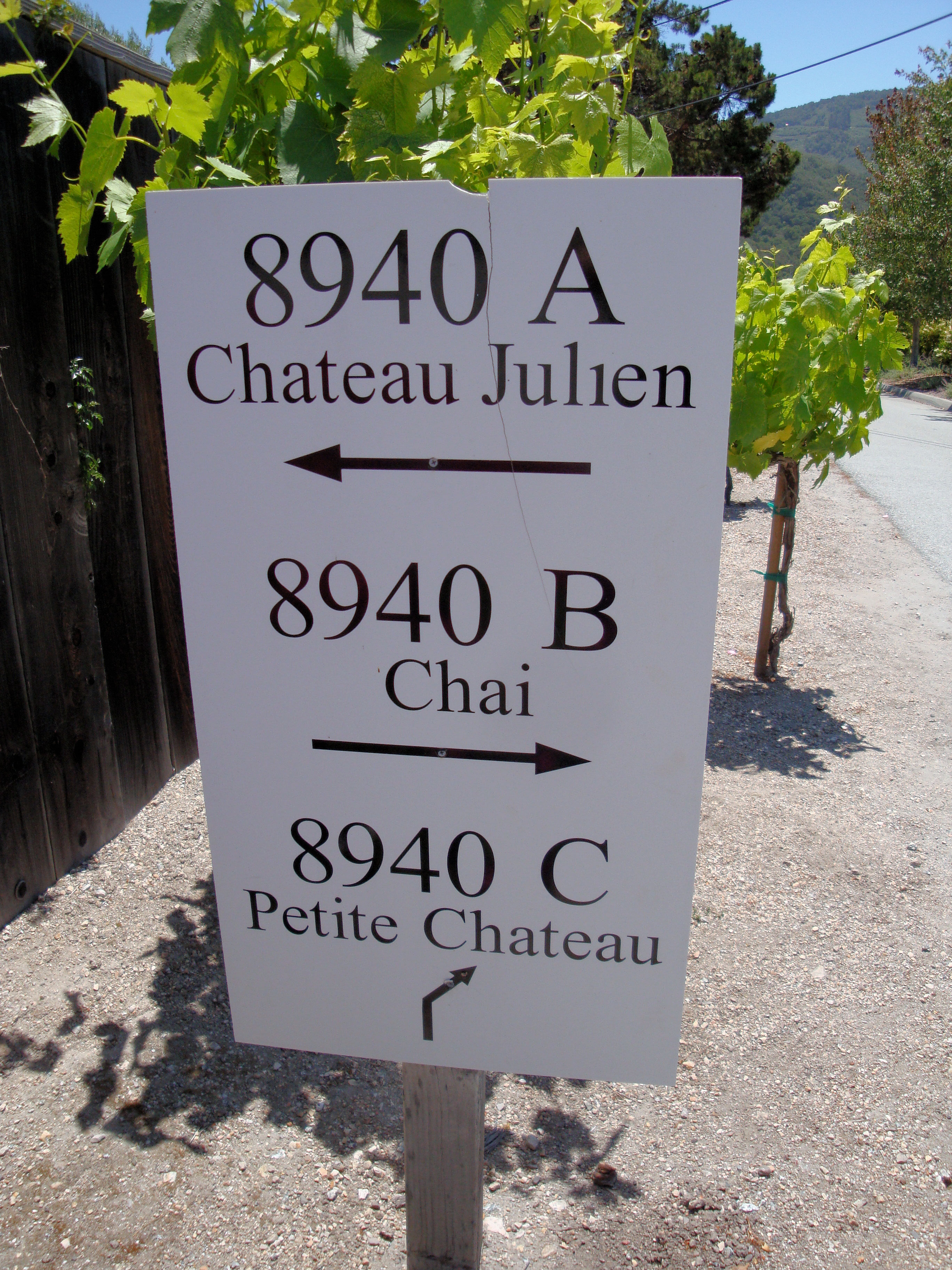
Carmel Valley vineyard

The very first irrigation system to be implemented in a valley vineyard took place in Monterey County in the early 1960s. The lack of annual rainfall made it necessary to have a predictable supply of water to the grapevines to ensure that they would thrive and produce a quality harvest with higher yields per acre. The early irrigation systems relied on sprinklers, however, many of the vineyards have converted to a drip irrigation system as an efficient method of distributing water. In addition to the ideal climate, the lack of abundant rainfall allows Monterey County grape growers to control the amount of water the vines receive. By utilizing some form of water distribution system, i.e., drip or sprinkler, growers can ration water controlling stress to the vines tailoring the fruit's flavor profile.

Monterey County was a location contributing to the development of mechanical harvesting producing an efficient method of removing grapes from the vines. A mechanical harvester vibrates the vines dislodging the fruit onto a conveyor belt transporting it to a bin to be either crushed/pressed immediately in the vineyard or trucked to the winery for fermentation. This method of harvesting is typically performed at night taking advantage of the cool temperatures. The primary benefit of mechanical harvesting is targeting the ripen grapes at the proper sugar-acid balance to pick and deliver them quickly to the winery. The result is a quality product for wine-making.

Beyond mechanization, the region has seen a systematic shift toward water conservation methods, such as widespread drip irrigation, in response to the semi-arid climate and periodic drought conditions in California.

== Unique Grapes ==
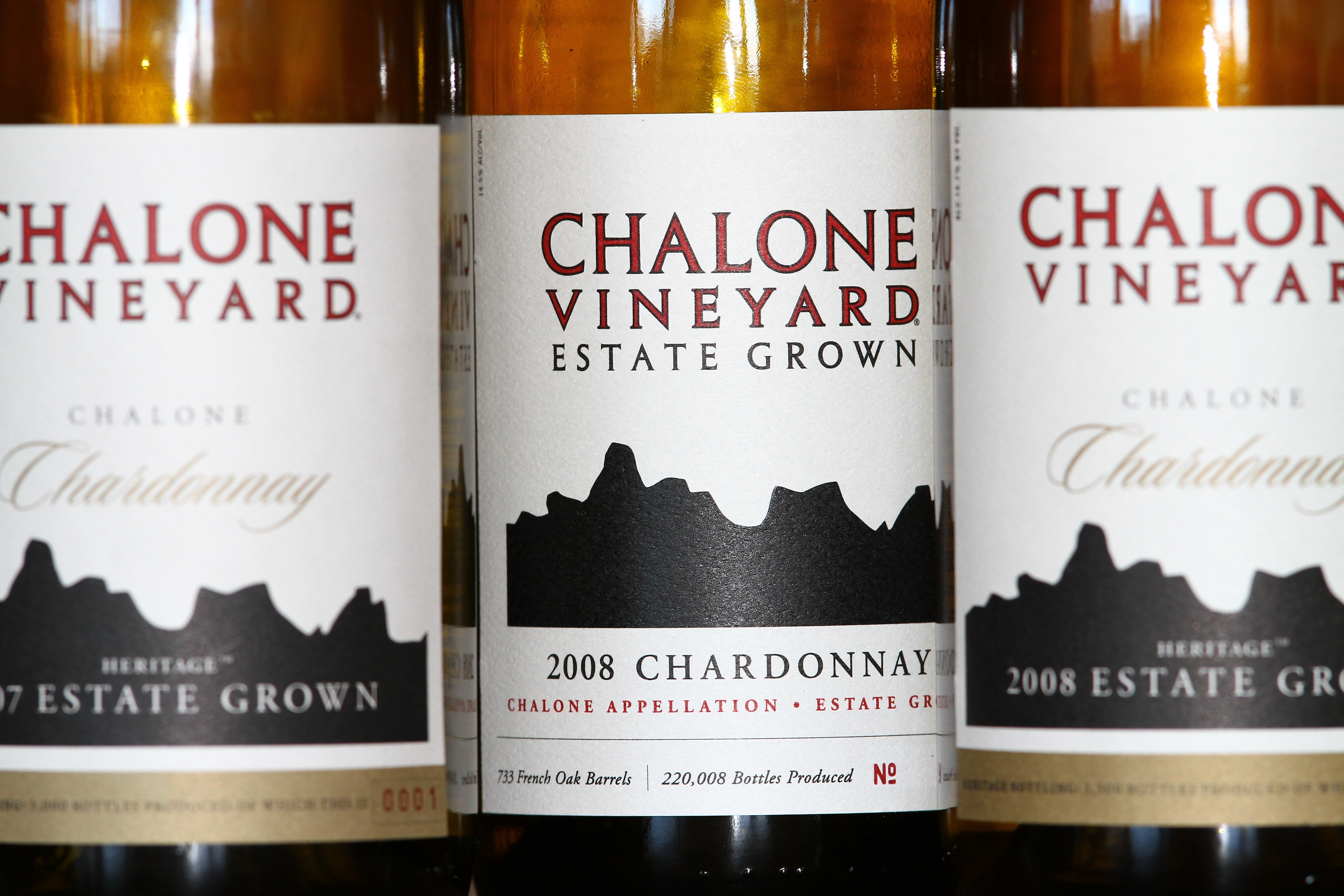

Only wine grapes are cultivated in Monterey County. Commercial table grapes or juice grapes are not grown. Wines sourced from the county vineyards have unique qualities which make them easily distinguishable from vintages produced elsewhere in California or the world. All have intense varietal flavor as the true taste of the grape is reflected in the wine. In Monterey County, Chardonnay is the primary grape as it comprises 40% of total vine acreage. Chardonnay grapes from Monterey County have become prized by winemakers throughout the state. Currently, the northern areas of the county mainly cultivate Chardonnay, Pinot Noir, Riesling, and Pinot Blanc due to the cooler weather. The warmer southern areas is where red grapes such as Cabernet Sauvignon, the county's second largest varietal, Merlot and Zinfandel are grown. Due to the region's specific microclimates, growers have successfully adapted certain clonal selections, such as specific Dijon clones of Pinot Noir and Chardonnay, which are engineered to thrive in extended, cool growing seasons.

== Economic impact ==
The wine industry is a significant component of Monterey County's agricultural economy. According to regional economic impact reports, the local wine industry generates over $1 billion in annual revenue and supports an estimated 6,000 direct and indirect jobs within the county.

== See also ==
- California wine
