= Bernabei =

Bernabei is a surname. It may refer to:

- Alessandro Bernabei (1580–1630), Italian painter of the late-Renaissance or Mannerist period
- Alexandro Bernabei (born 2000), Argentine footballer
- Ercole Bernabei (1622–1687), Italian composer and organist
- Ettore Bernabei (1921–2016), Italian television director and producer
- Joanna Bernabei-McNamee (born 1975), American college basketball coach
- Pietro Antonio Bernabei (born 1948), Italian painter
- Pier Antonio Bernabei (1570–1630), also known as Della Casa, Italian painter
- Raymond Bernabei (1925–2008), US soccer player
- Tommaso Barnabei (sometimes as Tommaso Bernabei), also known as Maso Papacello (c. 1500–1559), Italian painter of the Renaissance

== See also ==
- Bernabe (disambiguation)
