= Barnabe =

Barnabe mey refer to:

- Barnabe Creek, a stream in the U.S. state of California

== People ==
=== Given name ===
- Barnabe Barnes (c. 1571 – 1609), English poet
- Barnabe Googe (1540–1594), poet and translator
- Barnabe Jolicoeur (born 1966), former Mauritian sprinter
- Barnabé Nzilavo (1915 - ?) Central African politician and clerk
- Barnabe Rich (c. 1540 – 1617), English author and soldier
- Barnabe (artist) French painter

=== Surname ===
- Bruno Barnabe (1905–1998), English film and stage actor
- Charlie Barnabe (1900–1977), pitcher in Major League Baseball
- Heather Barnabe, CEO of G(irls)20
- Jean Barnabe (born 1949), former Congolese cyclist

== See also ==
- Barnabé (disambiguation)
- Barnaby (disambiguation)
