= Central Coast AVA =

Winemaking region in the United States

Coordinates: 36°22′20″N 121°18′39″W

Central Coast
- Wine region
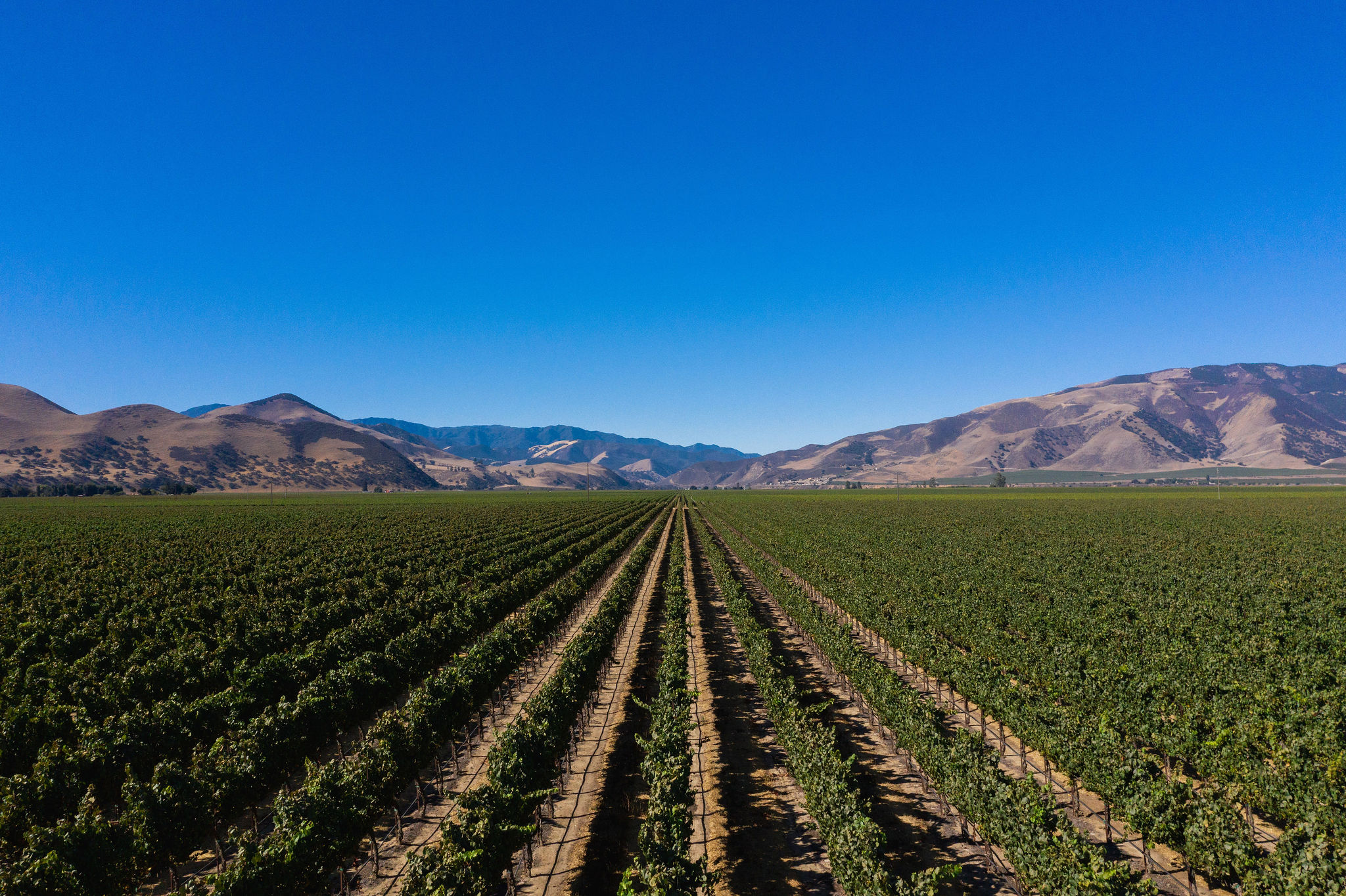
- Central Coast Vineyard
- Type: American Viticultural Area
- Year established: 1985; 1999 Amended; 2006 Amended
- Country: United States
- Part of: California
- Other regions in California: North Coast AVA, South Coast AVA
- Sub-regions: Alisos Canyon AVA, Arroyo Grande Valley AVA, Arroyo Seco AVA, Ben Lomond Mountain AVA, Carmel Valley AVA, Chalone AVA, Cienega Valley AVA, Edna Valley AVA, Hames Valley AVA, Lime Kiln Valley AVA, Lamorinda AVA, Livermore Valley AVA, Monterey AVA, Mt. Harlan AVA, Pacheco Pass AVA, Paicines AVA, Paso Robles AVA, San Antonio Valley AVA, San Benito AVA, San Bernabe AVA, San Francisco Bay AVA, San Lucas AVA, San Luis Obispo Coast AVA, San Ysidro District AVA, Santa Clara Valley AVA, Santa Cruz Mountains AVA, Santa Lucia Highlands AVA, Santa Maria Valley AVA, Santa Ynez Valley AVA, Sta. Rita Hills AVA, York Mountain AVA
- Total area: 1.42 million acres (2,219 sq mi)
- Size of planted vineyards: 100,000 acres (156 sq mi)
- Grapes produced: Albarino, Barbera, Cabernet Franc, Cabernet Sauvignon, Carignane, Chardonnay, Chenin blanc, Cinsault, Counoise, Dolcetto, Gewurztraminer, Grenache, Grenache blanc, Malbec, Malvasia, Marsanne, Merlot, Mondeuse, Mourvedre, Nebbiolo, Orange Muscat, Petit Verdot, Petite Sirah, Pinot gris, Pinot noir, Riesling, Roussanne, Sangiovese, Sauvignon blanc, Semillon, Syrah, Tempranillo, Vermentino, Viognier, Zinfandel
- No. of wineries: 578

Central Coast is an American Viticultural Area (AVA) that spans along the Central California Pacific coastline from the San Francisco Bay Area south through Monterey, San Luis Obispo and Santa Barbara Counties. It was established as the nation's 83^{rd} and the state's 48^{th} appellation on October 24, 1985 by the Bureau of Alcohol, Tobacco and Firearms (ATF), Treasury after reviewing the petition submitted by Taylor California Cellars, a winery in Gonzales, California, proposing the viticultural area named "Central Coast."
The boundaries of the Central Coast AVA, which have been expanded twice, include portions of six counties where approximately 100,000 acres (40,469 ha) cultivated with Chardonnay being more than half of the varietal. Within the multi-county AVA are numerous established appellations that share the same maritime climate produced by the Pacific Ocean. The plant hardiness zones range from 8a to 11a.

== Counties ==
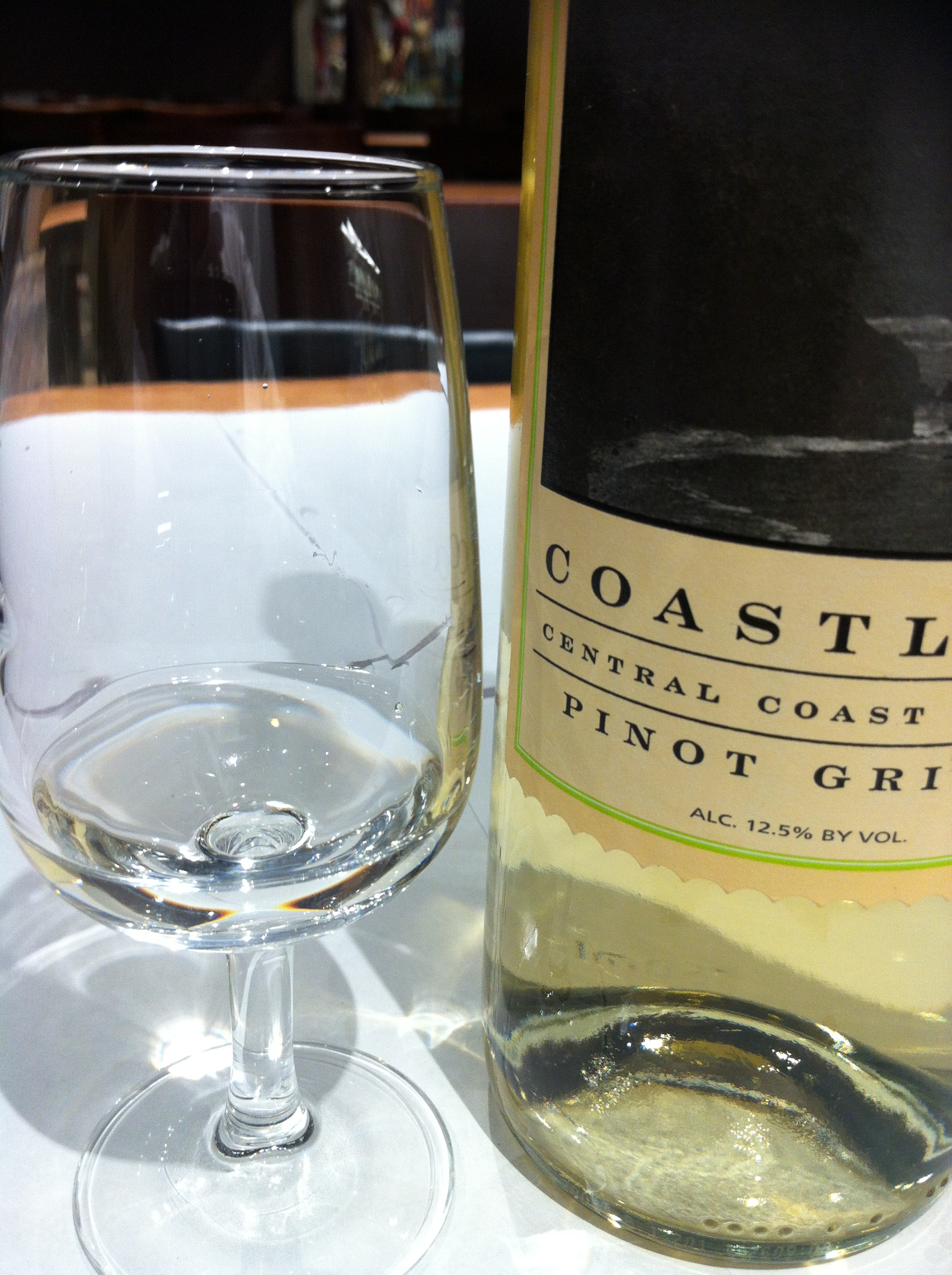
A Pinot grigio from the Central Coast AVA.

County names in the United States automatically qualify as legal appellations of origin for wine produced from grapes grown in that county and do not require registration with the Alcohol and Tobacco Tax and Trade Bureau (TTB). TTB was created in January 2003, when the Bureau of Alcohol, Tobacco and Firearms, or ATF, was extensively reorganized under the provisions of the Homeland Security Act of 2002. The counties within Central Coast are:

- San Francisco County
- Alameda County
- Contra Costa County
- San Mateo County
- Santa Clara County
- Santa Cruz County
- Monterey County
- San Benito County
- San Luis Obispo County
- Santa Barbara County
