= Pietro Antonio Bernabei =

Italian painter (born 1948)

- Born: 13 March 1948
- Died: 2023 (aged 74–75)
- Occupation: painter
- Style: bioarte

Pietro Antonio Bernabei (13 March 1948 – 2023) is an Italian painter notable for his concept of bioarte.

== Biography ==
A native of Florence, Pietro Antonio Bernabei has, since 1990, focused his artistic research on life's biological image and its functional aspects, searching for cross-references which unite and disunite art and life sciences. To define his artistic work, he introduced, in 2000, the idea of bioarte (the Italian word corresponds to BioArt in English).
