= Burnaby (disambiguation) =

Burnaby is a city in British Columbia, Canada.

Burnaby may also refer to:

Places in British Columbia:

- Burnaby (provincial electoral district), a former district that was partitioned prior to the 1966 election
- Burnaby (federal electoral district), a federal electoral district from 1976 to 1987
- Burnaby Range, a small mountain range
- Burnaby Mountain
- Burnaby Lake (see Burnaby Lake Regional Park)
- Burnaby Island

Other places:

- Pointe Burnaby, a minor summit in the Swiss Alps
- 4719 Burnaby, an asteroid
- Burnaby, a community in the township of Wainfleet, Ontario, Canada

People:

- Burnaby (surname)
- George Burnaby Drayson (1913–1983), British Conservative Member of Parliament

Other uses:

- Burnaby baronets, an extinct title in the Baronetage of the United Kingdom
- Burnaby-class ferry, two ferries serving in British Columbia
