= San Lucas AVA =

Appellation that designates wine in Monterey County, CA

Coordinates: 36°03′32″N 120°58′49″W

San Lucas
- Wine region
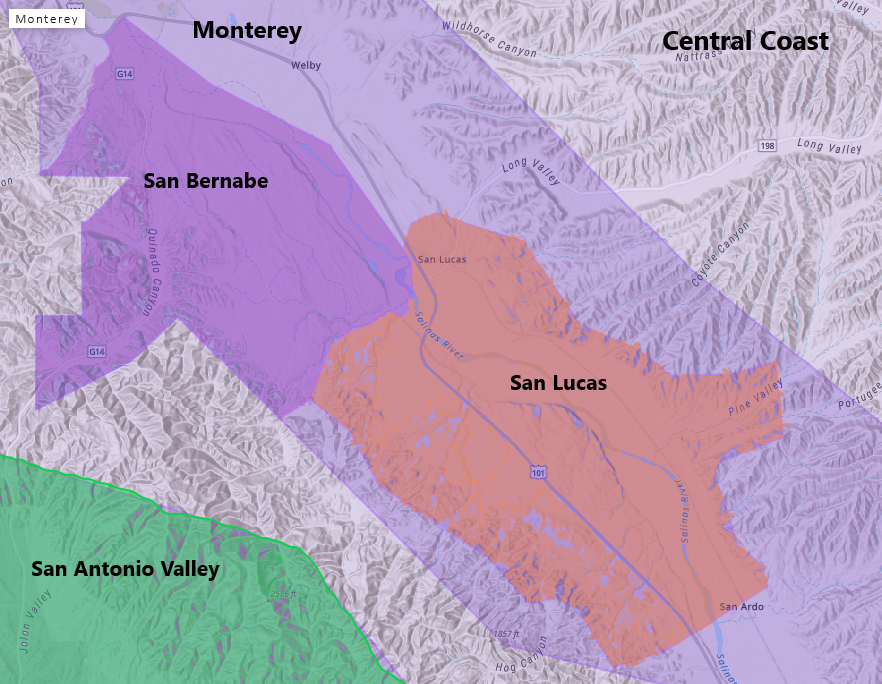
- Type: American Viticultural Area
- Year established: 1987; 2004 Amended
- Years of wine industry: 56
- Country: United States
- Part of: California, Central Coast AVA, Monterey County, Monterey AVA
- Other regions in California, Central Coast AVA, Monterey County, Monterey AVA: Arroyo Seco AVA, Hames Valley AVA, San Bernabe AVA, Santa Lucia Highlands AVA
- Growing season: 251 days
- Climate region: Region III-IV
- Heat units: 3,734 GDD units
- Precipitation (annual average): 10 to 20 in (254–508 mm)
- Soil conditions: Lockwood, Oceano, Metz, Garey, Greenfield and Snelling-Greenfield series complex loams
- Total area: 33,920 acres (53 sq mi); 32,639 acres (51 sq mi)
- Size of planted vineyards: 1987: 5,000 acres (2,023 ha); Current: 8,000 acres (3,237 ha)
- No. of vineyards: 8
- Grapes produced: Cabernet Sauvignon, Chardonnay, Malbec, Merlot, Petit Verdot, Petite Sirah, Pinot noir, Sauvignon blanc, Syrah

San Lucas is an American Viticultural Area (AVA) located in vicinity of the town of San Lucas between King City and San Ardo in southern Monterey County, California. It lies within the southern end of the fertile Salinas Valley. The appellation was established as the nation's 90^{th}, the state's 53^{rd} and the county's sixth AVA on January 29, 1987 by the Bureau of Alcohol, Tobacco and Firearms (ATF), Treasury after reviewing the petition submitted by Almadèn Vineyards of San Jose, California, proposing a viticultural area named "San Lucas." Based on the data submitted by the petitioner for vineyards near King City and San Lucas for the 11-year period 1974 to 1984, ATF concluded that the microclimate of the San Lucas Viticultural Area is the chief characteristic which distinguishes the area from other adjoining areas.

The boundary of San Lucas viticultural area encompasses approximately 33,920 acres (53 sq mi). The area spreads approximately 10 by 5 miles (16 by 8 km) on a northwest–southeast axis bisected by U.S. Highway 101 as the Salinas River flows north 155 miles (249 km) from its source in San Luis Obispo County through Monterey County into Monterey Bay. At the northern end of the appellation, the elevation of the Salinas River is approximately 340 feet (104 m) above sea level while at the southern end, the elevation of the Salinas River rises approximately 435 feet (133 m) above sea level. The proposed San Lucas viticultural area included the entire San Lucas Land Grant as well as the southern quarter of the San Benito Land Grant and the northern half of the San Bernardo Land Grant. The petition identified approximately 5,000 acres (2,023 ha) devoted to the cultivation of wine grapes. Vineyards locations range from alluvial fans and terraces over 350 feet (107 m) above sea level to low-lying hills having maximal elevations of 800 feet (244 m) above sea level. San Lucas is entirely within the expanse of the previously established Monterey viticultural area.

In 2004, the 24,796 acres (39 sq mi) San Bernabe viticultural area with 7,636 acres (3,090 ha) of vineyards was established adjacent to the northern border of San Lucas AVA. The realignment of the San Lucas transferred 1,281 acres (2 sq mi) of rolling, sandy land from its northwestern area to the southern San Bernabe area. This adjustment avoided splitting a large vineyard between the two areas, preventing overlapping boundaries and simply creating a common boundary line between the two AVAs.

== History ==
A Spanish navigator landed at Monterey in 1602. Subsequent overland expeditions from Mexico City to Alta California included padres who established 21 missions along the Camino Real in California. In the portion of California which later became Monterey County, missions were established at Carmel, Soledad and San Antonio. The Spanish imposed rigidly prescribed rules under which land was parceled into pueblos, presidios, missions and ranchos. From 1774 to 1824, Spanish governors in Monterey awarded 34 relatively small parcels of land as ranchos in present-day Monterey County. With Mexico's independence from Spanish rule in 1824, a succession of Mexican governors ruled California. These governors secularized the extensive landholdings of the missions by bestowing an additional 32 land grants, eight of which were in excess of 10,000 acres (16 sq mi). From 1836 to 1842, 28 land grants totaling over a quarter of a million acres were awarded. The Rancho San Benito (6,671 acres) and the Rancho San Bernardo (13,346 acres) land grants were awarded in 1841 and the Rancho San Lucas land grant (8,875 acres) was awarded in 1842. From 1862 to 1890, Alberto Trescony amassed extensive holdings of rangeland consisting of Rancho San Benito and Rancho San Lucas as well as the portion of Rancho San Bernardo north of present-day San Ardo. Trescony grazed large herds of sheep and cattle on the land and rented tracts of land to tenant farmers who raised feed grains, primarily wheat and barley. As the area prospered, a large grain elevator was erected on a site which later became the town of San Lucas. With the extension of railroad service south to San Lucas in the 1880s, the town continued to thrive and for a while its size ellipses that of King City, its immediate neighbor to the north. The "San Lucas District", comprising the town of San Lucas, the San Lucas and San Benito land grants, and the northern half of the San Bernardo land grant, gained a reputation for raising grain, cattle and horses. Because of the history of ownership by Trescony as well as references to the "San Lucas" agricultural district, ATF recognized that the name "San Lucas" applies to the area. The petition included documentation of the planting of wine grapes in 1970. Today, San Lucas AVA has approximately 8,000 acres (3,237 ha) devoted to wine grape cultivation. A drive south along U.S. Highway 101 from King City past San Lucas to San Ardo reveals mile after mile of vineyards planted on land extending to the foothills along both sides of the highway.

== Terroir ==
In addition to history and name, the San Lucas viticultural area is distinguished from adjoining areas to the east and west by differences in climate, temperature, topography, elevation, geology, and soils, and is distinguished from areas to the northwest and southeast by climate and temperature.

=== Topography ===
The topography of San Lucas ranges from bottomland the alluvial fans and terraces in the basin of the Salinas River to the gently rolling Cholame Hills in the Diablo Range east of the area and the slopes at the entrances to canyons in the foothills of the Santa Lucia Range west of the area. Elevations of existing grape plantings range from bottomlands at 350 feet (107 m) to the hills at 800 feet (244 m) above sea level. Lying entirely within the established Monterey AVA, the boundary of the San Lucas viticultural area defines a region well suited for viticulture. The topography of the area ensures adequate ventilation for viticulture.

=== Geology ===
The geology of land within the viticultural area varies little from adjoining basin lands to the northwest and southeast but does differ significantly from that of the hills and mountains to the east and west. The basin of the Salinas Valley consists of sand and gravel alluvia. The central part of the Santa Lucia Range directly west of the proposed area is composed of diatomaceous shale and massive sandstone. The Cholame Hills in the Diablo Range to the east consist chiefly of calcareous shale. The San Ardo area southeast of the AVA yields natural gas and oil.

=== Climate ===
The San Lucas appellation has the largest diurnal temperature variation than any AVA in California. There are different climatic regions and microclimates within Monterey County depending upon proximity to the Pacific Ocean. The climate is cool and moist along the coast, where fog is common, and hot and dry in inland areas in the south-central portion of Monterey County. Temperatures near the coast are uniform throughout the year. However, as distance from water increases, the ranges between seasonal highs and lows and between daytime highs and nighttime lows during the growing season widen. Along the coast, the average annual temperature is 57 °F (14 °C) where freezing temperatures are rare. In the inland southern part of the county, however, greater extremes in temperature and higher average temperatures prevail. The pattern of climate becomes more complex as the maritime influence interacts with mountain barriers and inland heating. The coastal mountains in the central and southern parts of the county hold marine air away from the interior, but as the sun heats the middle and southern parts of the Salinas Valley and higher elevations near the adjacent mountains, rising warm air draws cooler marine air from Monterey Bay into the valley. As a result of the sequence of daytime heating and nighttime cooling as well as the effects of wind and marine fog, daily and annual temperatures in the county's interior range widely. Average annual temperatures of about 60 °F (16 °C) are characteristic of the Salinas Valley. Temperatures farther inland in the southern Salinas Valley, however, climb fairly high during the day. In summer, the average daily maximum temperature remains in the low 60s along the coast and ranges from the middle 80s to the middle 90s in the southeastern end of the Salinas Valley and the eastern mountain area. Readings of 115 °F (46 °C) have been made in the southeastern-most inland reaches of the Salinas Valley. Precipitation, mostly rain, occurs chiefly in winter. As a result of the terrain and the maritime influence, the amount of precipitation varies considerably from point to point. Annual precipitation ranges from about 105 inches (2,667 mm) along the crest of the Santa Lucia Range to 10 inches (254 mm) in southernmost Salinas Valley. In most areas of the coastal range, the annual amount averages more than 20 inches (508 mm)and is about 80 inches (2,032 mm) at higher elevations. Most of the Salinas Valley is in the rain shadow of the coastal range and, consequently, the annual total precipitation drops to as little as 15 inches (381 mm) in areas to the south of King City. Grape growing in the more interior reaches of the Salinas Valley requires irrigation from May to October. East of the Salinas Valley, precipitation increases again on the western slopes of the Gabilan and Diablo Ranges with about 20 inches (508 mm) reported at the higher elevations. The location of the San Lucas Viticultural Area in the southern end of the Salinas Valley allows a distinction in climatological characteristics from the rest of the county in that the area experiences heat and less intrusion of the fog common to those portions of the Salinas Valley which are closer in proximity to the Monterey Bay. The April through October growing season of the viticultural area is distinctly warmer than that of the portion of the Salinas Valley to the northwest and cooler than that of the portion of the valley to the southeast. The climate of the area is characterized by cold summer night temperatures, dropping as much as 40 °F (4 °C) below daytime highs. Hygrothermograph readings document a 30 °F (−1 °C) range between high and low temperatures at Almadèn's vineyard situated east of King City and a 40 °F (4 °C) range between high and low temperatures the Almadèn's vineyard situated south of San Lucas. The thermograph readings support a "warm" Climatic Region III classification for the petitioner's vineyard east of King City and a "cool" Climatic Region IV classification for the petitioner's vineyard south of San Lucas. Based on the data submitted by the petitioner for vineyards near King City and San Lucas for the 11-year period 1974 to 1984, ATF concluded that the microclimate of the San Lucas Viticultural Area is the chief characteristic which distinguishes the area from and other adjoining areas. The USDA plant hardiness zone is 9a.

=== Soil ===
The basin of the Salinas River contains a mix of alluvial sand, silt and clay carried downstream over time by tributaries from the mountains and hills surrounding the Salinas Valley. The soil in the vicinity of the town of San Lucas is mostly Lockwood shaly loam, otherwise known as "Chalk Rock." Other soil series common to the proposed area are Oceano (loamy sand), Metz complex (loam and sand), Garey (sandy loam), Greenfield (fine sandy loam), and the Snelling-Greenfield complex loam). All are rapidly draining to well drained, coarse to medium textured soils that formed in alluvium. Slopes are 0 to 30 percent. The natural vegetation consists of annual grasses and forbs. Roots penetrate to a depth of more than 60 inches (152 cm) into the soft, fractured rock with little resistance. The vines are thus able to put more energy into producing grapes with excellent concentration. Soils of these series are used mostly for dryland grain and range. With the use of irrigation, these soils are ideal for the planting of row crops such as grapes.
