= Bernabe (given name) =

Bernabe is a given name.

Those bearing it include:

- Bernabe Rivera (fl. 1830s), Uruguayan ruling-family member & genocidist of the Charrua people
- Bernabe Buscayno (born 1950s), Philippine soldier and activist
- Bernabe Gonzalez Garcia (born 1933), American religious leader
- Bernabe Concepcion (born 1988), Filipino boxer
- Bernabé Zapata Miralles (born 1997), Spanish tennis player
