= Paulino Bernabe =

Paulino Bernabe may refer to:

- Paulino Bernabe Senior (1932–2007), Spanish luthier
- Paulino Bernabe II (born 1960), Spanish luthier
