= San Bernardo, Chihuahua =

San Bernardo
- Location within Chihuahua Location within Mexico
- Coordinates: 26°28′N 104°29′W

San Bernardo (also, Rancho San Bernardo) is a village in Chihuahua, Mexico. It had a elevation of 1,212 m (3,976 ft).
