= Monterey AVA =

Viticultural area in Monterey County, California

Coordinates: 36°20′47″N 121°17′52″W

Monterey
- Wine region
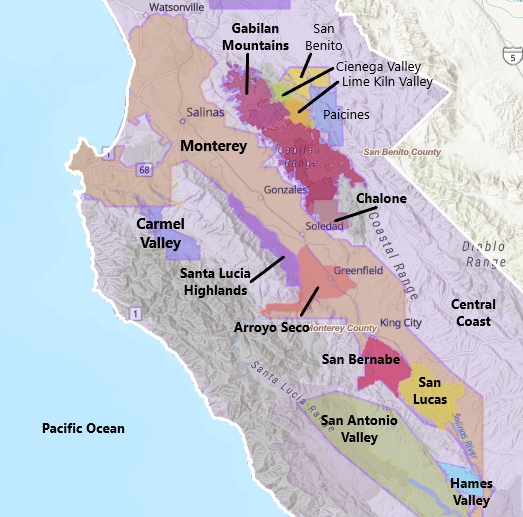
- Type: American Viticultural Area
- Year established: 1984; 1987 Amended
- Years of wine industry: 256
- Country: United States
- Part of: California, Central Coast AVA, Monterey County
- Other regions in California, Central Coast AVA, Monterey County: Chalone AVA, Carmel Valley AVA, Gabilan Mountains AVA, San Antonio Valley AVA
- Sub-regions: Arroyo Seco AVA, Hames Valley AVA, San Bernabe AVA, San Lucas AVA, Santa Lucia Highlands AVA
- Climate region: Regions I-IV
- Heat units: 57 to 60 °F (14–16 °C)
- Precipitation (annual average): 10 to 16 in (254–406 mm)
- Soil conditions: Arroyo Seco, Chualar, Danville, Elder, Garey, Greenfield, Gloria, Lockwood, Metz, Oceano, Pico, Placentia, Rincon, Tujunga series
- Total area: 1,825 square miles (1,168,000 acres)
- Size of planted vineyards: 40,000 acres (16,000 ha)
- Grapes produced: Albarino, Alvarelhao, Cabernet Sauvignon, Chardonnay, Chenin blanc, Gewurztraminer, Grenache, Malbec, Malvasia, Merlot, Orange Muscat, Petite Sirah, Pinot blanc, Pinot gris, Pinot noir, Riesling, Roussanne, Sangiovese, Sauvignon blanc, Semillon, Souzao, Syrah, Tannat, Tinta Cao, Touriga Nacional, Valdiguie, Viognier, Zinfandel

Monterey is an American Viticultural Area (AVA) located in eastern Monterey County, California. It was recognized on July 16, 1984, by the Bureau of Alcohol, Tobacco and Firearms (ATF), Treasury after reviewing the petition submitted by the Monterey Winegrowers Council to establish the "Monterey" viticultural area. The designated area within the multi-county Central Coast AVA expands almost the entire length of the county from the Monterey Bay southern shoreline to the Salinas river valley framed by the Santa Lucia, Sierra de Salinas and Gabilan Ranges stretching north–south for about 100 miles (160 km) from Watsonville to its southern point, abutting the town of Paso Robles in San Luis Obispo County. Monterey AVA expands approximately 360,000 acres (560 sq mi) with about 40,000 acres (16,000 ha) of cultivated vineyards. The AVA includes parts of the Carmel and the Salinas valleys containing five smaller American viticultural areas: Arroyo Seco, Hames Valley, San Bernabe, San Lucas and Santa Lucia Highlands. The northern portion is a cool growing region with a very long growing season. Daytime temperatures rarely exceed 75 °F (24 °C) in most parts of the region, although the southern segments of the AVA can measure 100 °F (38 °C) at times. The soil is sandy loam and most regions require irrigation from the Salinas River.

As the largest AVA in Monterey County, the region is home to considerable variations in microclimates and soil types with the dominant soil being loam based. In areas closer to the cold Pacific currents, Pinot Noir, Riesling and are the predominant varieties, while in the warmer inland valleys further south, Bordeaux varietals are most often grown. Approximately 50 percent of the vines in production are Chardonnay.

== History ==
"Monterey" is the name of a peninsula, a city, a bay, and a county. The name "Monterey" originated in the days of the Spanish rule of Mexico. In 1602, explorer Sebastian Vizcaino named the bay in honor of the Conde de Monterrey, Spanish viceroy of Mexico. In 1770, the Spanish established Presidio of Monterey and Franciscan friar Junípero Serra founded missions at Jolon, Soledad and Monterey, which are cities in present-day Monterey County. Named the capital of Alta California in 1775, Monterey was fortified and became a port of entry and center of Spanish culture in the "New World." Grapes were planted by the Franciscan friars at the mission in Monterey in 1770 and in subsequent years at the missions in Jolon and Soledad. In May 1771, Serra relocated the Monterey mission to land near the mouth of the Carmel River because it was better suited for farming.

After the first commercial plantings of grapes in the early 1960s, the modern era of winegrowing took root and "Monterey" had become recognizable prime viticultural land. By the late 1960s and early 1970s, the quality of some California wines was outstanding but few took notice as the market favored French brands. At the legendary Paris Wine Tasting of 1976 on May 24, Chalone Vineyard's 1974 Chardonnay ranked 3rd in the white wine category scored by renown French oenophiles. The identical vintage ranked 1st in a repeat event at the San Francisco Wine Tasting of 1978.

During the 1982 Monterey AVA petition, there were approximately 36,000 acres (14,569 ha) devoted to viticulture, 14 registered wineries, a 15th under construction, and three proposed viticultural areas, namely, Arroyo Seco, Carmel Valley and Chalone. In addition to the petition for the "Monterey" viticultural area, ATF received petitions for the establishment of viticultural areas named "King City" and "San Lucas." Within the boundary of the approved viticultural area encompasses about 640,000 acres (1,000 sq mi) of which 35,500 acres (14,366 ha), approximately 5.5 percent, are devoted to grape growing. The Monterey appellation now boasts over 40,000 acres (16,187 ha) of vinifera wine grapes under cultivation.

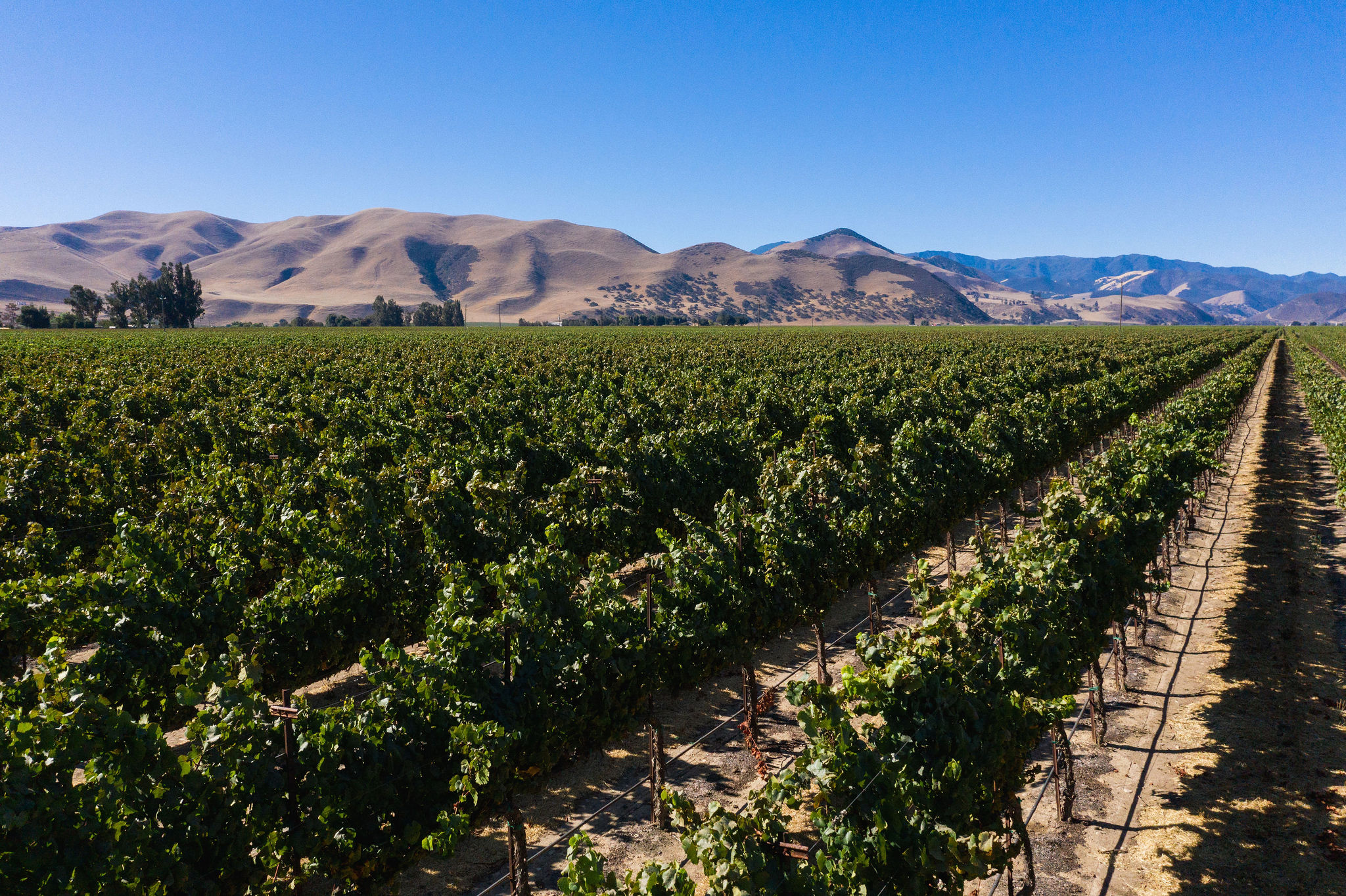
Monterey AVA Vineyard

== Terroir ==
The Monterey viticultural area is distinguished from surrounding areas by the composition of its soils, elevation, topography, and the marine influences from the Pacific Ocean, specifically, wind, rainfall, fog and climatic variances. Its valley floors are flat and several miles wide with 1,000 feet (305 m) elevated slopes creating an ideal topography for viticulture. It expands from the southern shores of Monterey Bay to the long valley between the Gabilan and Sierra de Salinas mountains forming a natural funnel, drawing cool air inland from the coast. Fog and cool breezes are a vital part of the Monterey terroir, just as they are further north in Napa and Sonoma valleys. The Salinas is the largest river in the central coast of California and is vital to the success of viticulture in the area as the source for various methods of irrigation by the grape growers in the area. It stretches for 170 miles (274 km), draining a land area of 4,160 square miles (10,800 km^{2}). On its route between the Los Padres National Forest and the Pacific, it passes through Paso Robles and San Lucas before it even reaches the Monterey County line. Once it crosses and flows north of the county border, the river runs through the heart of the Hames Valley, San Bernabe and Arroyo Seco viticultural areas into Monterey AVA.

The weather within Monterey AVA differs from surrounding areas primarily by the sparse rainfall and the marine influences of the Pacific Ocean and Monterey Bay. Compared to surrounding areas, it is relatively dry throughout the growing season with average annual rainfall in the valleys is 10 inches (250 mm) which is lower than in surrounding areas necessitating irrigation. The watersheds of the Santa Lucia, Gabilan, and Diablo ranges provide adequate water through underground aquifers to enable irrigation as well as to satisfy other agricultural requirements.

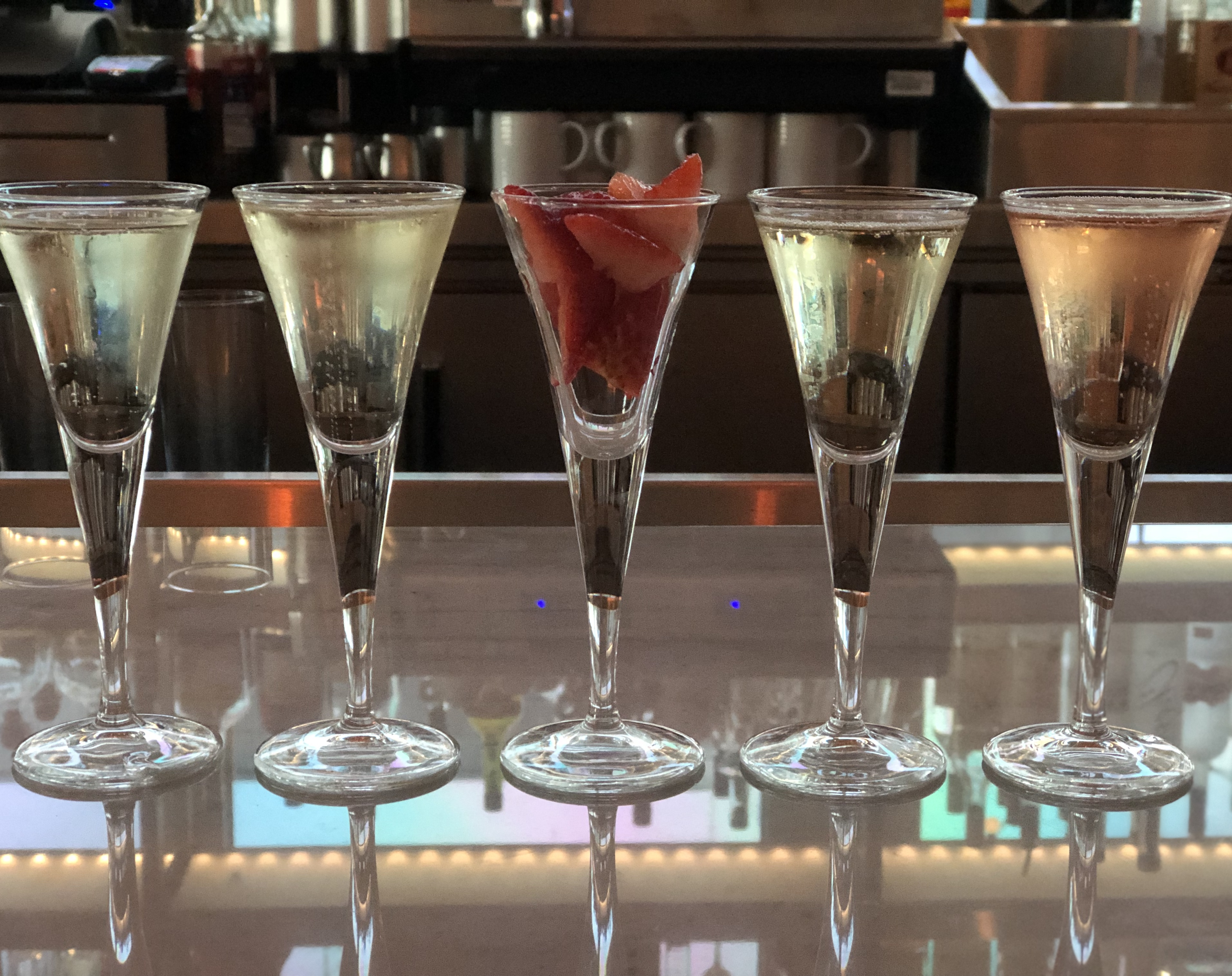

== Wine Industry ==
The Monterey Winegrowers Council, the petitioner for the viticultural area, summarized the views of its membership and endorsed the alternative boundary proposed by ATF on the basis that geographical features and not existing planting distributions should determine the proposed boundaries. They reported that since the submission of the original petition in May 1982, the acreage planted to wine grapes in Monterey County had increased from 31,632 to 35,758 acres (12,801 to 14,471 ha). They agreed with ATF's proposal to exclude the approved Chalone viticultural area on the basis that its elevation locates it in a different climate zone. With the exception of Carmel Valley, ATF concured with the petitioner. ATF found that the Carmel Valley viticultural area has features which are more similar to the Chalone viticultural area than to those distinguishing grapes grown in the generally lowland Monterey area. These comments were best summarized in the statement of one commenter that "when comparing grape growing areas within the proposed Monterey viticultural area, several areas possess micro-climatological and mino-geological characteristics that offer subtle influences on grape growing practices." ATF agreed it was consistent with established agency policy pertaining to the establishment of boundaries for viticultural areas to include subareas having minor differences in climate and geology. Chardonnay is the predominate varietal throughout this region, accounting for more than 50 percent of the vines currently in production.. In its cooler northern area, Riesling and Pinot Noir are popular, while in the warmer southern inland valleys, Bordeaux varietals like Cabernet Sauvignon and Merlot, Rhone-styles like Syrah and Petite Sirah, and even some Zinfandel are mostly grown.

== See also ==
- California wine
