= Hames Valley AVA =

Appellation that designates wine in California

Coordinates: 35°45′53″N 120°40′41″W

Hames Valley
- Wine region
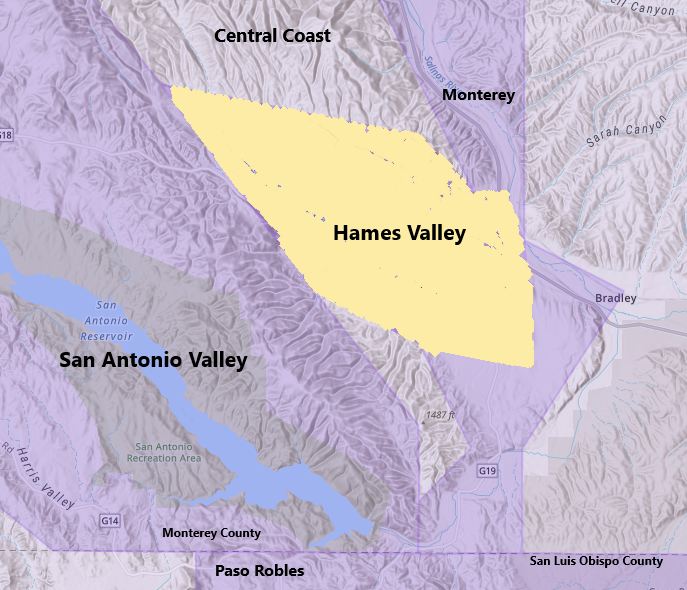
- Type: American Viticultural Area
- Year established: 1994
- Years of wine industry: 55
- Country: United States
- Part of: California, Central Coast AVA, Monterey County, Monterey AVA
- Other regions in California, Central Coast AVA, Monterey County, Monterey AVA: Arroyo Seco AVA, San Bernabe AVA, San Lucas AVA, Santa Lucia Highlands AVA
- Climate region: Region III-IV
- Heat units: 3200–3500 GDD units
- Precipitation (annual average): 10 to 12 in (254–305 mm)
- Soil conditions: Lockwood series gravelly sandy loam
- Total area: 10,240 acres (16 sq mi)
- Size of planted vineyards: 1994: 630 acres (255 ha); 2024: 2,200 acres (890 ha)
- No. of vineyards: 8
- Grapes produced: Alvarelhão, Cabernet Sauvignon, Malbec, Mourvèdre, Petite Sirah, Petit Verdot, Souzao, Tannat, Tempranillo, Tinta Cão, Touriga Nacional
- No. of wineries: 20

Hames Valley is an American Viticultural Area (AVA) in Monterey County, California a few miles from its southern border with San Luis Obispo (SLO) County. It was established as the nation's 124^{th}, the state's 72^{nd} and the county's eighth appellation on March 25, 1994 by the Bureau of Alcohol, Tobacco and Firearms (ATF), Treasury after reviewing the petition submitted by Mr. Barry C. Jackson of the Harmony Wine Company, on behalf of Valley Farm Management, Soledad, California, and Mr. Bob Denney & Associates, Visalia, California, proposing a Monterey County viticultural area named "Hames Valley."

The viticultural area is a small east–west oriented valley, west of the generally north–south orientation of the meandering Salinas River. It is located between the southeast foothills of the Santa Lucia Mountains and the west of the confluence of the Salinas, San Antonio, and Nacimiento Rivers. The watershed of Hames Creek is the defining feature of the appellation. Hames Valley is 3 miles (5 km) west of the town of Bradley and about 20 miles (32 km) north of the city of Paso Robles and AVA in San Luis Obispo county. It encompasses about 16 square miles (10,240 acres) with 630 acres (255 ha) of cultivation and wholly lies within the vast Monterey viticultural area. There were several existing vineyards, but no wineries when the appellation was recognized. The shale loam soil found in Hames Valley, combined with its warmer weather is the ideal setting for growing signature Rhone varietals.

== History ==
The name Hames Valley has been associated with this area since the latter part of the nineteenth century. The petition cites Monterey County Place Names which states that the valley was named after John Hames, who was born in Osage County, New York and immigrated to California in the 1840s. A millwright by trade, he and his brother built a flour mill in Corralitos. In 1883, he went into the sheep herding business on his ranch in Hames Valley and held extensive land holdings. In addition, the name Hames Valley appears on the U.S.G.S. Bradley Quadrangle, 15 minute series, map of Bradley, California, and also appears on the U.S.G.S. 7.5 minute series map entitled Hames Valley. The petition notes that the area's creek, valley, hamlet and post office bears John Hames' name.

== Terroir ==
=== Topography ===
Hames Valley is a small east–west oriented valley, west of the generally north–south orientation of the meandering Salinas River. Formed by the watershed of Hames Creek, Hames Valley thrusts its way 7 miles (11 km) into the eastern flank of the Santa Lucia Mountains. Hames Creek empties into the Salinas River approximately two miles downstream from the confluence of the San Antonio and Salinas Rivers. Hames Valley is separated from the San Antonio River by a ridge averaging 1,500 feet (457 m) in elevation, the highest peak at 1,984 feet (605 m) . A similar ridgeline forms the northern boundary and separates Hames Valley from the Salinas River. The general topography within the valley consists of gently sloping alluvial fans and associated terraces with generally well defined drainages.

=== Climate ===
Hames Valley is the southernmost viticultural area in Monterey County offering a unique climate. The petition submitted a study by A.N. Kasimatis, Extension Viticulturist, University of California, Davis (August 7, 1970). The study shows that heat summation for the Hames Valley-Bradley area is generally in the 3200 to 3500 degree-day (GDD) range. This corresponds to a warm Region III-IV, similar to the King City and Paso Robles areas with Nacimiento Dam having 3757 GDD, Region IV. This differs from the generally cooler climate (Region I-II) for the Gonzales, Soledad and Greenfield areas farther north. Regarding other climatic factors, the rainfall in the Hames Valley area averages 10 to 12 inches (254–305 mm) annually. The petition states that the east–west axis of the Hames Valley relative to the north–south orientation of the Salinas Valley results in a reduced wind stress factor in the Hames Valley area. Wind speed builds up later in the day and at reduced velocities relative to the "wind-tunnel" effect in the Gonzales-Soledad-Greenfield area. This results in shorter overall exposure to wind stress, from both a time and wind velocity standpoint. The USDA plant hardiness zone is 8b to 9a. In summary, the following factors differentiate the Hames Valley from the adjacent Salinas Valley:
(a) An east–west axis relative to the general north–south orientation of the Salinas Valley.
(b) A generally warmer microclimate: Region III-IV vs. Region I-II.
(c) Higher overall elevation: 500 to 800 feet (152–244 m) for Hames Valley, 100 to 500 feet (30–152 m) for the Salinas Valley.
(d) Later daily windspeed build-up and duration of wind.
(e) More homogeneous soil profile: Hames Valley with one principal soil type; Salinas Valley, over 70 soil types.
(f) Geographically distinct and separate from the Salinas River Valley.

=== Soil ===
The petition submitted a composite map of the Hames Valley area compiled from the Soil Survey of Monterey County, California, U.S.D.A. Soil Conservation Service, U.S. Forestry Service, University of California Agricultural Experiment Station (1972). According to this map, the principal soils in the area are gravelly sandy loams of the Lockwood series. These comprise approximately 75 percent of the soil types present. Lesser amounts of Chamise shaly loams and Nacimiento silty clay loams are also present. All current viticulture takes place in the Lockwood series soils. Soils in the surrounding areas are also silty and shaly loams, but are located on 30 to 50 percent slopes and are of different compositions. The preponderance of the Lockwood shaly clay loam and the geomorphology (flat, well defined valley floor) distinguishes Hames Valley apart from the surrounding mountainous areas.

== Viticulture ==
Hames Valley has enjoyed the status of its own AVA since 1994 though wine grapes were first cultivated there in 1971. This region has about 10,000 acres suitable for grape growing, with 2,200 acres currently planted. The shale-loam soil found in Hames Valley, combined with its warmer weather is an ideal setting for growing signature Rhone varietals. Hames Valley is known its long, warm days that make this an ideal area for sun-loving reds. The region produces balanced, full-bodied wines of intensity, such as Cabernet Sauvignon, Petite Sirah and Petit Verdot. In addition, traditional port grapes such as Tinta Cao and Touriga Nacional are grown.
