= Barnabe (artist) =

French street artist

Barnabé
- Born: Pierre-Emmanuel Rome; 1994 (age 31–32); Nice, France
- Education: Architecture studies, Paris
- Known for: The "les Barnabé" characters
- Movement: Street art

Barnabé (born Pierre-Emmanuel Rome in 1994) is a French street artist and painter from Nice. He is known for small, ghost-like pop characters, called "les Barnabé", which he has painted in the street and on canvas. His work has been shown in France and abroad, including exhibitions in Abidjan, Singapore and Dubai.

== Life and work ==
Rome was born in Nice in 1994. He adopted the name Barnabé in 2013 and began placing his ghost-like characters in the city's streets with unauthorised paste-ups. In 2015 he moved to Paris to study architecture. By 2023 he was again based in Nice and had moved his characters onto canvas.

The characters share a simple, recognisable shape; individual figures include Harold, Bazile and Suzanne. He works with stencils, spray paint and a graphics tablet, and applies about fifteen layers of paint to each canvas. By 2023 he had made more than 300 paintings, sold at prices between €3,000 and €8,000, and he named the 1990s as his main source of inspiration.

His work has been exhibited in Dubai, New York, Singapore and Abidjan. In September 2020 the Art'Time gallery in Abidjan, Ivory Coast, showed his paintings in a four-artist pop art exhibition, for which he also painted a 16 m^{2} (170 sq ft) mural on the gallery façade. In 2024 the GCA Gallery in Nice held a solo exhibition of his work, Imagination.

== See also ==
- Urban art
- List of street artists
