= Santa Lucia Highlands AVA =

Appellation that designates wine in Monterey County, CA

Coordinates: 36°26′01″N 121°25′13″W

Santa Lucia Highlands
- Wine region
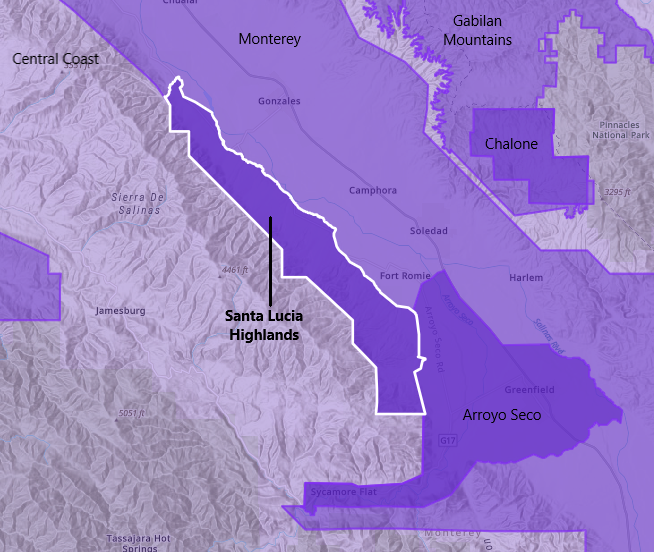
- Type: American Viticultural Area
- Year established: 1991; 2006 Amended; 2021 Amended
- Years of wine industry: 53
- Country: United States
- Part of: California, Central Coast AVA, Monterey County, Monterey AVA
- Other regions in California, Central Coast AVA, Monterey County, Monterey AVA: Arroyo Seco AVA, Hames Valley AVA, San Bernabe AVA, San Lucas AVA
- Growing season: 167 days
- Climate region: Region I and II
- Heat units: 2978 GDD
- Precipitation (annual average): 10 to 15 in (254–381 mm)
- Soil conditions: Slopes: Cieneba, Sheridan, Vista, Junipero, McCoy, Gazos, Linne and Santa Lucia-Relize series Valley floor: Mocho, Cropley, Pico and Danville series
- Total area: 22,000 acres (34 sq mi); 21,772 acres (34 sq mi)
- Size of planted vineyards: 5,000 acres (2,023 ha)
- No. of vineyards: 21
- Grapes produced: Cabernet Franc, Cabernet Sauvignon, Chardonnay, Chenin blanc, Malbec, Merlot, Petit Verdot, Pinot gris, Pinot noir, Riesling, Roussanne, Syrah, Viognier
- No. of wineries: 18

Santa Lucia Highlands is an American Viticultural Area (AVA) located in central Monterey County, California and lies within the boundaries of the larger, elongated Monterey viticultural area. It was established as the nation's 117^{th}, the state's 67^{th} and the county's seventh wine appellation on May 15, 1992 by the Bureau of Alcohol, Tobacco and Firearms {ATF}, Treasury after reviewing the petition submitted by Mr. Barry Jackson of the Harmony Wine Company proposing a viticultural area to be known as "Santa Lucia Highlands."

The area consists of the eastern flank of the Santa Lucia Mountain Range and is located completely within the boundaries of the established Monterey viticultural area. The general boundaries are: Limekiln Creek to the north; the Salinas River and its associated terraces to the east; the western border of the Arroyo Seco viticultural area in the southeast; and the western border of the Monterey viticultural area to the west. Inititially, the total area of the appellation was approximately 22,000 acres (34 sq mi) with 1,850 acres (749 ha) committed to active viticulture, with plans to cultivate an additional 400 acres (162 ha). Winegrowing in the region dates back to the late 18th Century, when Spanish missionaries planted the first vines. The modern wine industry sprang up in the 1970s. Some of the vineyards lie as high as 1,200 feet (366 m) above sea level, with about half of them planted to the Pinot noir grape. The region enjoys cool morning fog and breezes from Monterey Bay followed by warm afternoons thanks to direct southern exposures to the sun.

In 2021, the Alcohol and Tobacco Tax and Trade Bureau (TTB), Treasury ruled on a modification of the shared Santa Lucia Highlands-Arroyo Seco AVA boundary. The modification removed 376 acres (1 sq mi) from the Santa Lucia Highlands viticultural area, and moved 148 acres (0 sq mi) from the Arroyo Seco viticultural area placing it entirely within the Santa Lucia Highlands. The modification reduced the size of the AVA by less than 1 percent and did not have any impact on the boundaries of the Monterey AVA or the Central Coast.

== Terroir ==
The following factors differentiate Santa Lucia Highlands from the adjacent Salinas Valley floor and other viticultural areas in Monterey County: (1) A well defined alluvial terrace running the length of the eastern boundary; (2) Generally cooler microclimate: cool Region I/II vs. Region I/III; (3) Different soil types: gravelly, sandy loam vs. silty clay loam; (4) Higher elevation: initially 40 to 120 ft (12–37 m) higher than the valley floor and climbing to 1,200 ft (366 m) above the valley floor; (5) Climate: less wind and earlier fog burn-off with morning sun and; (6) East facing slopes receiving morning sun first.

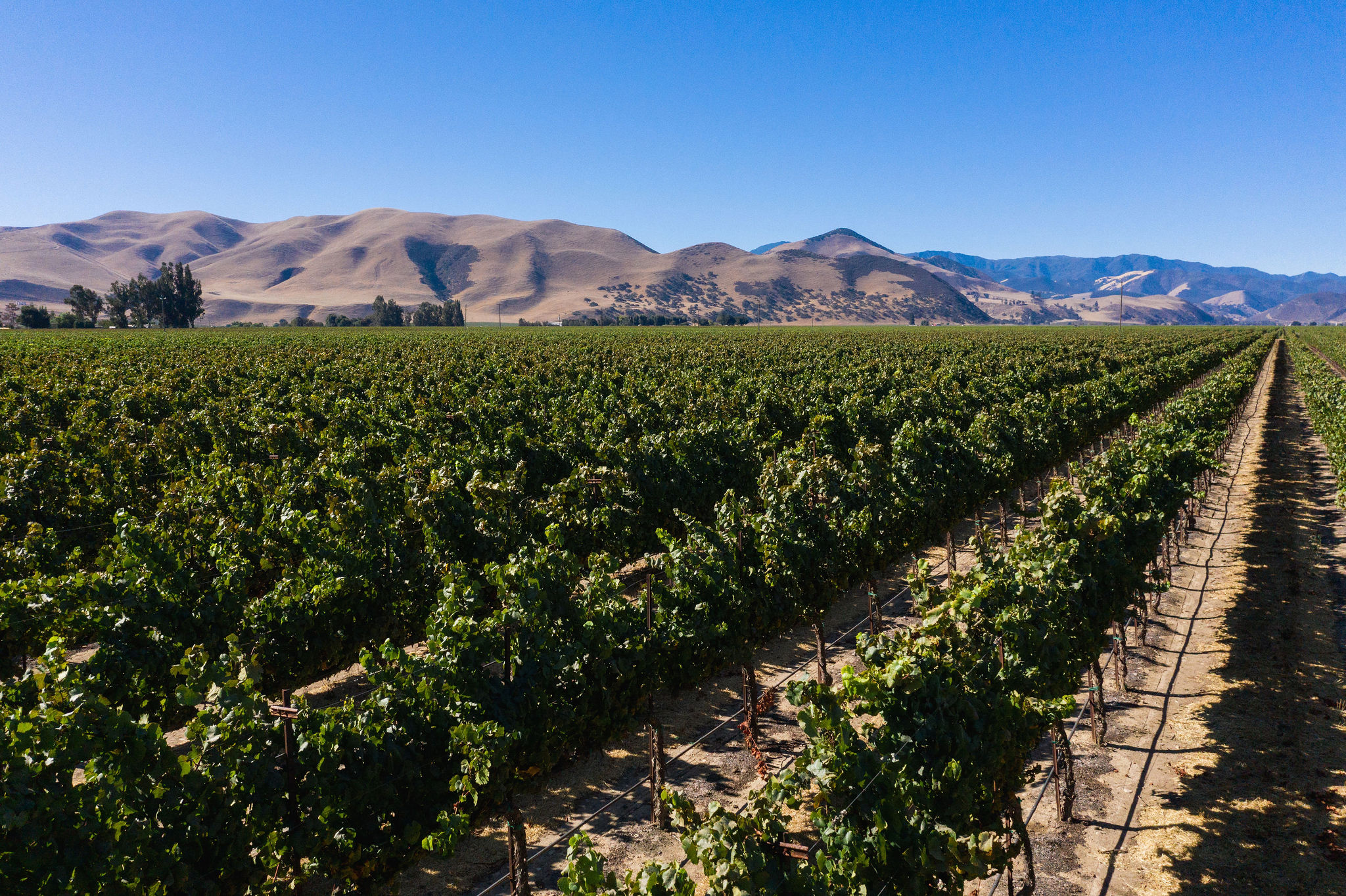
Santa Lucia Highlands

=== Topography ===
The Santa Lucia Highlands comprise the eastern flank of the Santa Lucia Mountains that extend westward to the Pacific Ocean. The dominant feature of the Santa Lucia Highlands are the alluvial terraces. These terraces are one of the major factors differentiating the "highlands" from the Salinas valley floor. The main terrace formation runs from just southwest of Gonzales to the area due south of Soledad. The most northerly section of the viticultural area, from Limekiln Creek to the area near the junction of River Road and Gonzales River Road, is characterized by multiple terrace formations.

=== Climate ===
Proximity to Monterey Bay results in a strong maritime influence on temperature, wind, and fog formation. Examination of the heat summation data shows a generally cooler climate on the west side of the valley. Precipitation is concentrated in the winter months and averages 10 to 15 inches (254–381 mm) annually. Due to the maritime influence, fog is a constant feature in the Salinas Valley, particularly during summer months. The fog burns off earlier in the day in the areas above the valley floor. This earlier bum-off results in greater light intensity for a longer period for vineyards located in the highlands. The north–south orientation of the valley causes cool marine air to be drawn into the valley by warm air rising off the valley floor. The narrow aspect of the valley, approximately six miles (10 km) wide at Gonzales and three miles (5 km) at Soledad, creates somewhat of a wind-tunnel effect. Wind speeds average 5 to 16 miles per hour (8–26 km/h), but higher velocities are not uncommon, particularly around Soledad where the valley narrows. Wind speeds are highest through the center of the valley and diminish at the valley edges and in the highlands. The USDA plant hardiness zone range is 9a to 10a.

=== Soil ===
The "soil survey of Monterey County, California" issued by the Department of Agriculture Soil Conservation Service, April 18, 1978, show the primary soils associated with the alluvial terraces of the Santa Lucia Highlands to be of the Arroyo Seco and Chualar series. These are well-drained soils formed from granitic alluvium, and in the case of the Chualar series, some schistose rocks on alluvial fans and terraces. These soils are generally loam or gravelly, sandy loam, with an underlying very gravelly material. Permeability is moderately rapid. Roots can penetrate to a depth of 60 inches (152 cm) or more. These soils form slopes of 2 percent to 9 percent on most of the alluvial fans and terraces. Included in the alluvial fans and terraces are small areas of Placentia, Rincon, Tujunga, Lockwood, Gorgonio, and Hanford soils. The upper slopes of the Santa Lucia Mountains are composed of Cieneba, Sheridan, Vista, Junipero, McCoy, Gazos, Linne, and Santa Lucia-Relize association soils, on slopes of 15 percent to 75 percent grade. The geology of the Santa Lucia range consists of large masses of granitic and metamorphic rock in the northern section, diatomaceous shale and massive sandstone in the central area, and masses of shale, sandstone, and serpentine to the south. In contrast, the soils of the valley floor are primarily from the Mocho, Cropley, Pico and Danville series. The Mocho soils of the valley floor are silty clay loams of 0 percent to 2 percent grade. The Pico and Danville soils are sandy clay loams of 0 percent to 2 percent grade.

== Viticulture ==
Santa Lucia Highlands is also resident of two vineyards Wine Enthusiast magazine recognized as "Grand Cru" vineyards, by renown winemakers, for consistently producing the highest-quality Chardonnay wine year after year. Sleepy Hollow Vineyard and Double L Vineyard, are owned by E&J Gallo and Morgan Winery, respectively.

The River Road Wine Trail runs along the length of this AVA.
