= Arroyo Seco AVA =

Appellation that designates wine in Monterey County, CA

Coordinates: 36°17′33″N 121°17′23″W

Arroyo Seco
- Wine region
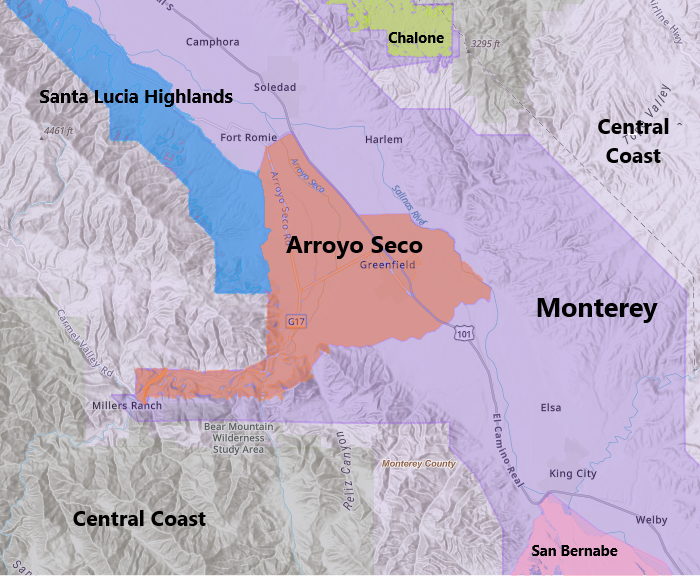
- Type: American Viticultural Area
- Year established: 1983; 2006 Amended; 2019 Amended; 2021 Amended
- Years of wine industry: 64
- Country: United States
- Part of: California, Central Coast AVA, Monterey County, Monterey AVA
- Other regions in California, Central Coast AVA, Monterey County, Monterey AVA: Hames Valley AVA, San Bernabe AVA, San Lucas AVA, Santa Lucia Highlands AVA
- Growing season: 245 days
- Climate region: Region II-III
- Heat units: 1875–2250 GDD
- Precipitation (annual average): 9.5 in (240 mm)
- Soil conditions: Mocho, Lockwood, Arroyo Seco, Rincon, Elder and Chular series. Coarse sandy loams
- Total area: 1983: 18,240.0 acres (28.5 sq mi); 2006: 18,040 acres (28 sq mi); 2019: 18,130 acres (28 sq mi); 2021: 17,982 acres (28 sq mi)
- Size of planted vineyards: 1983: 8,500 acres (3,440 ha); 2024: 7,000 acres (2,833 ha)
- No. of vineyards: 32
- Grapes produced: Cabernet Franc, Cabernet Sauvignon, Chardonnay, Gewurztraminer, Grenache, Merlot, Mourvedre, Muscat Canelli, Orange Muscat, Pinot blanc, Pinot gris, Pinot noir, Riesling, Sangiovese, Sauvignon blanc, Syrah, Tempranillo/Valdepenas, Vermentino, Viognier, Zinfandel
- No. of wineries: 1983: 2; 2024: 10

Arroyo Seco is an American Viticultural Area (AVA) in Monterey County, California, southeast of Monterey Bay. It was established as the nation's 29^{th}, the state's eighteenth and the county’s third appellation on May 15, 1983 by the Bureau of Alcohol, Tobacco and Firearms (ATF), Treasury after reviewing the petition submitted by the Arroyo Seco Winegrowers and Vintners, an association composed of grape growers and vintners with vineyards, proposing a viticultural area within Monterey County known as "Arroyo Seco."

Arroyo Seco is a triangular shaped area adjacent to the Arroyo Seco Creek which flows into the Salinas River near Soledad. At the outset, the appellation encompassed 18,240 acres (28.5 sq mi) in the Salinas Valley landform with about 8,500 acres (3,440 ha) of cultivation and two bonded wineries. Its proximity to the Pacific Ocean produces the maritime climate, and is best suited for those cool climate grape varieties.

In 2019, the Alcohol and Tobacco Tax and Trade Bureau (TTB), Treasury expanded Arroyo Seco by 90 acres (36 ha), however in 2021, TTB ruled on a modification of the shared boundary between Santa Lucia Highlands and Arroyo Seco AVAs. The boundary modification transferred 148 acres (60 ha) of foothills terrain from the west side of the Arroyo Seco to the southeastern area of the Santa Lucia Highlands. One vineyard containing approximately 135 acres (55 ha) was affected by the realignment, and the vineyard owner included a letter of support in the petition. The modification reduced Arroyo Seco AVA by less than 1 percent and did not affect the boundaries of the Monterey or the Central Coast AVAs.

== History ==
Arroyo Seco is the name historically given to a Spanish land grant and rancho existing on the banks of the Arroyo Seco Creek. The name arroyo seco meaning "dry stream" in Spanish (/əˈroʊoʊ ˈseɪkoʊ/ ah-RRO-yo SE-ko) has been used continually through the years in conjunction with the river and rancho however, its link to a viticultural area is relatively recent as stated in the petition. The Arroyo Seco area was identified as a grape growing region by the Winkler-Amerine report in 1935. However, the area's history of viticulture actually did not occur until 1962 when vines were planted by Mirassou Sales, a San Jose winery. In 1963, Wente Brothers of Livermore, California, planted wine grapes along the Arroyo Seco Creek which were known as Wente's Arroyo Seco Vineyards. Since 1963, many vineyards were established in the region and Arroyo Seco has been referenced in numerous magazines, newspapers and wine publications describing vintages sourced here.

== Terroir ==
=== Topography ===
Arroyo Seco's topography distinguishes it from the surrounding areas consisting of sloping benchland surrounding the Arroyo Seco Creek. The highest elevations of over 600 feet (183 m) occur to the west on the Sierra de Salinas, foothills of the Santa Lucia Mountains. A ridgeline of between 300 and 500 feet (91 and 152 m) in elevation separates Arroyo Seco from areas immediately to the south. From these elevations, the area slopes gradually downward to the lowest points of 180 feet (55 m) elevation on the north along the Arroyo Seco Creek, and 220 feet (67 m) elevation on the west along the Salinas River. It is this sloping benchland high above the Salinas River which provides adequate drainage and freedom from frost for area vineyards.

=== Climate ===
The climate of the Arroyo Seco area is unique in amount of rainfall, temperature range, and the variability of the winds. The major climatic influences are the Pacific Ocean and Monterey Bay. To the west, the Santa Lucas Mountains block damaging Pacific rains from the area. Winds off Monterey Bay, however, blow down the Salinas River, cooling the valley and providing a moderate climate. The cooling effects of the wind make the northern Salinas Valley quite cold. Gonzales is classified as Region I on the scale developed by Winkler and Amerine to measure degree days, with 350 degree days. In the Arroyo Seco area, the climate is considered Region II. Soledad, to the immediate north, registers 2880 degree days while Wente's Arroyo Seco Vineyards average between 1875 and 2250 degree days. The cooling effect of the wind diminishes further south. King City averages 3150 degree days, placing it in Region III while San Miguel is classified as Region IV. The growing season is approximately 245 days. Rainfall is sparse in the Arroyo Seco viticultural area. Soledad averages just 9.5 inches per year, less than received to the north where Salinas averages 13.7 inches and Gonzales 12.3 inches per year. Because of the sparse rainfall, all vineyards within the Arroyo Seco region irrigate, using water from Arroyo Seco Creek rather than from the Salinas River. The USDA plant hardiness zones are 9a to 10a.

=== Soil ===
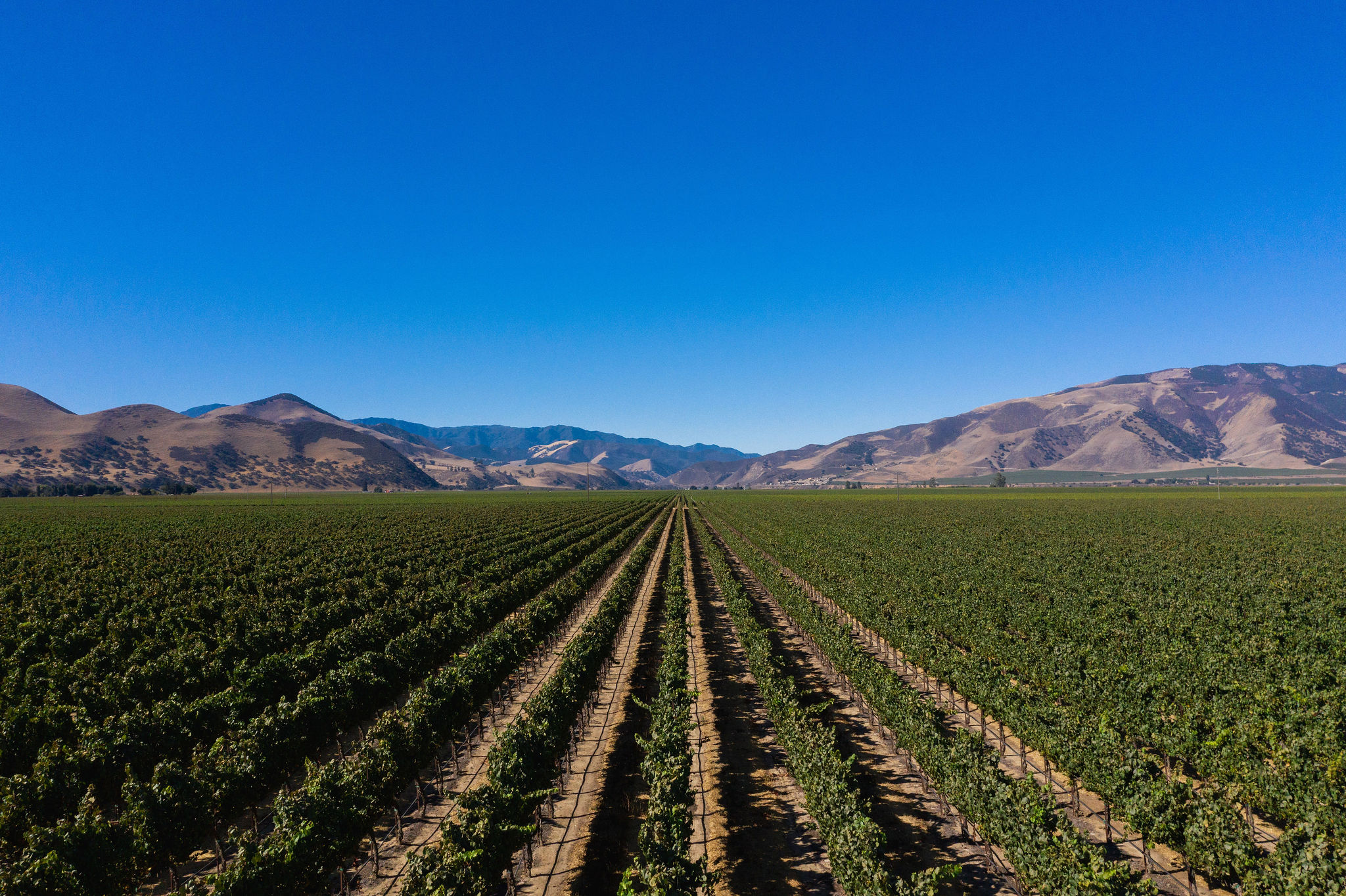
Arroyo Seco Vineyards

The soils in the Arroyo Seco area consist of a series of gravelly and fine sandy loams well suited to the cultivation of grapes. The viticultural area consists of an alluvial fan formed by well drained soils with slopes ranging from 0 to 9 percent. Principal soil series include Mocho, Lockwood, Arroyo Seco, Rincon, Elder and Chular. The prominent soils, Chular and Arroyo Seco, are coarse sandy loams derived from decomposed granite washed down from the Gabilan Mountains. These soils are gravelly and low in lime content similar to the vinyards in the Medoc and Graves districts of Bordeaux, and to the better vineyards in the Palatinate. The boundaries of the Arroyo Seco viticultural area are based on a combination of climate, physical features, soils and irrigation sources. The boundaries and the appropriate U.S.G.S. maps are fully described in the. regulatory language. ATF notes that it has received a petition for an adjacent viticultural area immediately south of the Arroyo Seco area.

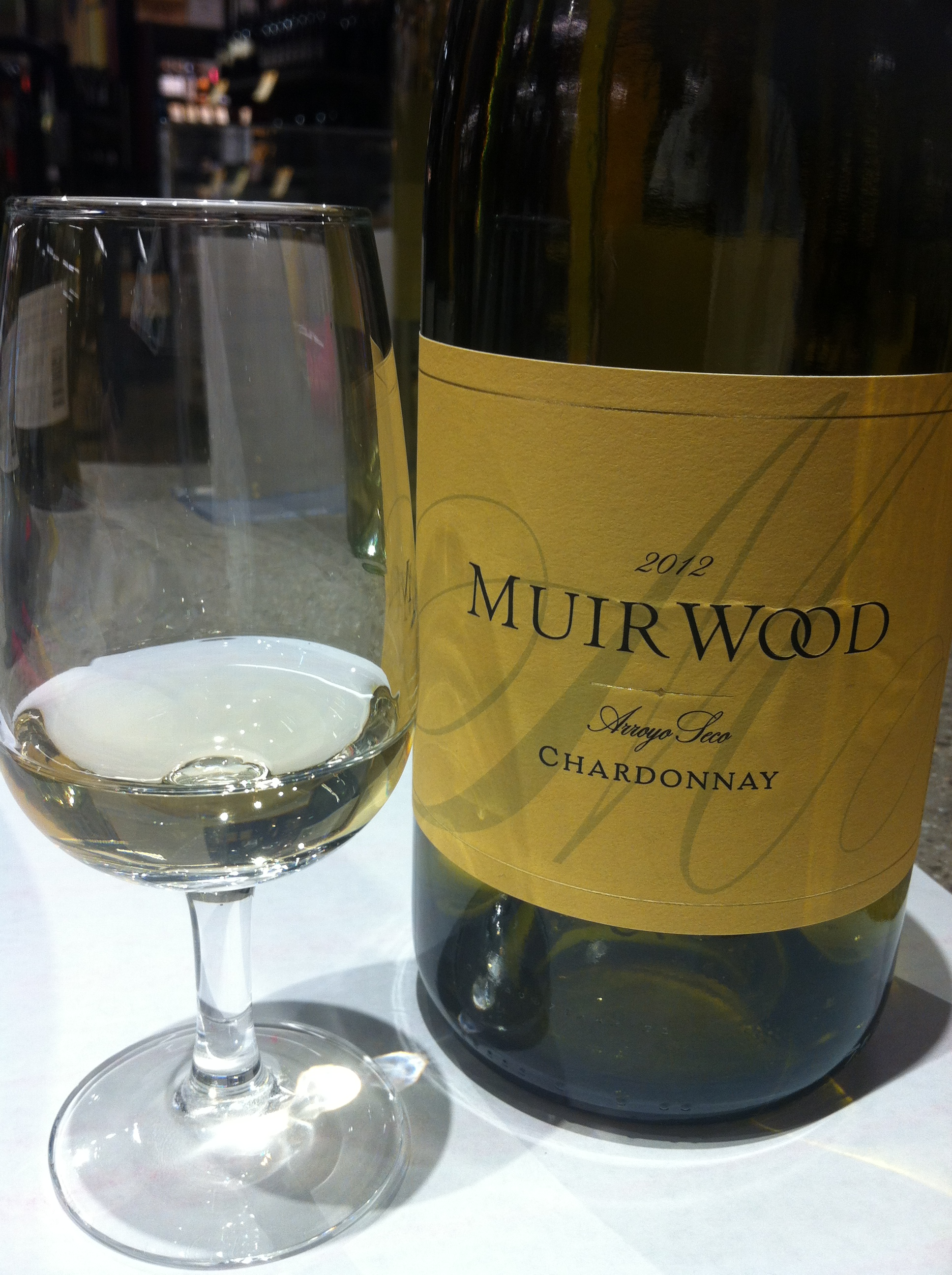
Arroyo Seco Chardonnay

== Viticulture ==
Arroyo Seco AVA has celebrated four decades of viticulture and innovative wine-making showcasing varietals such as its Chardonnay, Riesling and Pinot Noir with newer vintages like the Musqué clone of Sauvignon Blanc. As one of California's early pioneer AVAs, Arroyo Seco winegrowers, vintners, and landowners had the desire and knowledge to grow the AVA using science, geology, hydrology, and microclimate data contributing to the state's international standing as a primer viticulture producer. Today, the region hosts a blend of large wineries, many of which have been here for 40 years or longer, and many small and prestigious wineries that source its distinctive fruit throughout California. The Arroyo Seco Winegrowers Association provides advocacy, marketing and support services to its winery and winegrower members by educating consumers, media and trade audiences on the distinct characteristics of Arroyo Seco. As the third oldest AVA in Monterey County, it helped establish the county's historic reputation has a popular destination for American viticulture.

== See also ==
- California wine
