= San Bernabe AVA =

Appellation that designates wine in Monterey County, CA

Coordinates: 36°08′56″N 121°06′02″W

San Bernabe
- Wine region
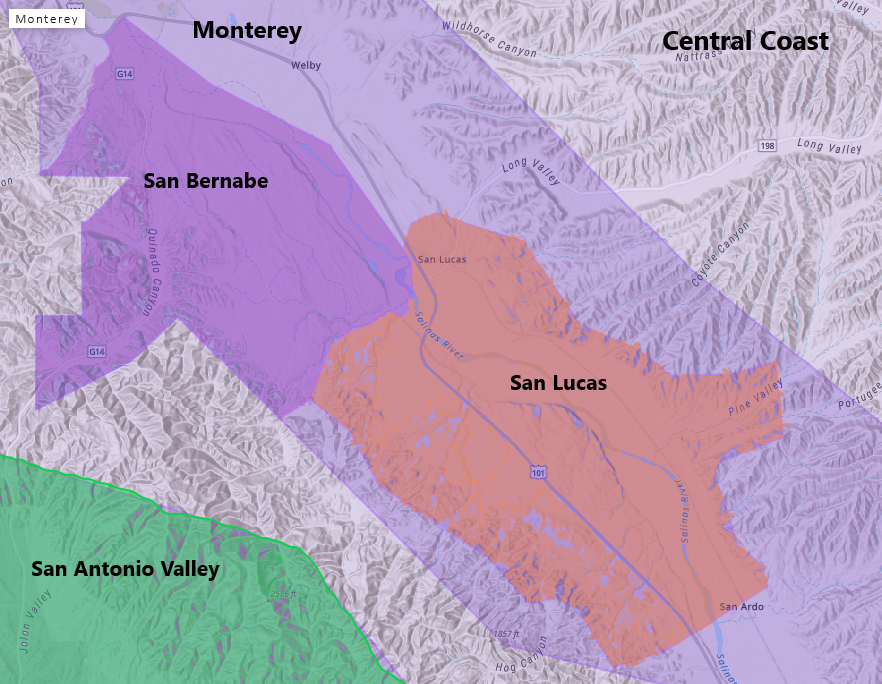
- Type: American Viticultural Area
- Year established: 2004
- Years of wine industry: 184
- Country: United States
- Part of: California, Central Coast AVA, Monterey County, Monterey AVA
- Other regions in California, Central Coast AVA, Monterey County, Monterey AVA: Arroyo Seco AVA, Hames Valley AVA, San Lucas AVA, Santa Lucia Highlands AVA
- Climate region: Region III
- Heat units: 3389 GDD
- Precipitation (annual average): 13 inches (330 mm)
- Soil conditions: Alluvial sandy loam, to sand to limestone
- Total area: 24,796 acres (39 sq mi)
- Size of planted vineyards: 2004: 7,636 acres (3,090 ha); 2024: 5,000 acres (2,023 ha)
- No. of vineyards: 1
- Grapes produced: Chardonnay, Pinot Noir, Riesling, Cabernet Sauvignon and Merlot

San Bernabe is an American Viticultural Area (AVA) located in southern Monterey County, California. It lies within the larger, enlongated Monterey AVA in the Salinas Valley sandwiched between the Salinas River to the east, and the Santa Lucia Mountains to the west. The appellation's northern border is Pine Canyon and is adjacent on its southern border to the San Lucas viticultural area. It was established as the nation's 154^{th}, the state's 93^{rd} and the county's ninth wine appellation on June 29, 2004 by the Alcohol and Tobacco Tax and Trade Bureau (TTB), Treasury after reviewing two petitions submitted by Claude Hoover from Delicato Family Vineyards proposing the establishment of a new viticultural area to be named "San Bernabe", and the realignment of the adjacent, established San Lucas viticultural area.

San Bernabe viticultural area encompasses 24,796 acres (39 sq mi) of predominantly rolling hills with sandy soils with currently 5,000 acres (2,023 ha) of cultivation on its sole vineyard. The realignment of the San Lucas viticultural area transferred 1,281 acres (2 sq mi) of rolling, sandy land from its northwestern area to the southern San Bernabe area. The adjustment avoided splitting a large vineyard, preventing overlapping boundaries and simply creating a common boundary line between two AVAs.

== History ==
San Bernabe (/ˈsam beɾˈnaβe/ san-ber-na-BE) is a well recognized name that has its origins in the early days of Spanish settlement in the colony of Monterey. Father Pedro Font, a member of the California expedition of Spanish explorer Juan Bautista de Anza, documented the initial reference to San Bernabe on March 8, 1776. He wrote in his diary, "we had passed a spur of the Sierra de Santa Lucia.... The road at first runs through a spur of mountains, until it descends to a wide valley called the Cañada de San Bernabé. The San Bernabé area land of two leagues was granted to Petronillo Rios, a former Mexican artillery Sergeant, in 1842. His wife, Catarina and their family began raising cattle and crops on this land and producing wine from their grapes. The Rios ranch, known as Rancho San Bernabé, eventually became a successful vineyard and wine producing property. Other Spanish land grant ranchos were created in the 1840s, but none in the area shared the recognition of Rancho San Bernabé as a significant vineyard property. In the 1970s, Prudential-Southdown purchased the San Bernabe acreage for vineyard development and, in 1988, the Indelicato family bought the lone San Bernabe vineyard for its premium and super-premium wine market potential.

== Boundary ==
The Thompson Canyon and San Lucas U.S.G.S. quadrangle maps prominently identify the area as San Bernabe. The relevant Thomas Guide labels this area Rancho San Bernabe. The TopoZone map Web site identifies this rural area as San Bernabe. The San Bernabe vineyard estate occupies 52 percent of the viticultural area of the same name. The San Bernabe area boundary line connects benchmarks, mountain peaks, and other USGS map geographical features by using straight lines and several roads that follow the hilly terrain and soil changes. The San Bernabe viticultural area shares portions of its west and southwest boundary lines with the surrounding Monterey AVA, which is, in turn, surrounded by the expansive, multi-county Central Coast appellation. San Bernabe AVA shares its south boundary line with the realigned San Lucas AVA northwestern boundary. The transfer of 1,281 acres (518 ha) from San Lucas to the San Bernabe viticultural area better defines the geographical differences between the established San Lucas and the new San Bernabe avoiding to split an existing vineyard between two AVAs.

== Terroir ==
=== Topography ===
The San Bernabe viticultural area is located immediately south of King City in the long Salinas Valley. The approximately 9 by 7 miles (14 by 11 km) viticultural area occupies the valley floor and rolling foothills, extending west from the Salinas River to the Santa Lucia Mountains. Unique viticultural qualities of the San Bernabe area include its climate, water quality, wind-produced eolian soils, and rolling hills. The 1,281 acres (518 ha) realigned from the San Lucas viticultural area possess similar eolian soils, rolling hills topography, and irrigation water quality as found in the new San Bernabe viticultural area.

=== Climate ===
The Salinas Valley forms a broad funnel for the strong, cool, afternoon marine winds coming off Monterey Bay during the warm months. The winds are drawn inland and south through the Salinas Valley by rising warm air that moderates the valley's high and low temperatures to varying degrees, producing a graduated effect in the valley. As a result, the San Bernabe area is warmer than viticultural areas to the north, and closer to Monterey Bay, and cooler than the adjoining San Lucas viticultural area to the immediate south. The winds dissipate gradually as they travel inland from Monterey Bay and create a series of temperature-unique, grape-growing areas within the long Salinas Valley. San Bernabe, at 60 miles (97 km) south of the Monterey Bay, averages a 30-degree daily temperature variation, while Salinas, at 17 miles (27 km) from the Monterey Bay, averages a smaller 18-degree daily temperature variation. The cool night air helps retain the grapes' acid and color, while the daily heat encourages ripeness and flavor. The San Bernabe area averages 30 frost- days annually, while Salinas, closer to Monterey Bay, averages only four frost-days. More rain falls at the Salinas Valley's extreme north and south ends, with less falling in the region between, which includes the San Bernabe viticultural area. At the valley's north end, the city of Salinas averages 17.5 inches (444.5 mm) of annual rainfall, and, at the valley's south end, Paso Robles averages 19 inches (483 mm). The San Bernabe area, between the two ends, averages only 13 inches (330 mm) of annual rainfall. Irrigation water is used extensively in the AVA's vineyards. The water comes from area reservoirs and contains only small amounts of carbonates and nitrates, which benefits the grapevines and soil. Toward the Monterey Bay, water quality declines as nitrate and carbonate levels increase. The USDA plant hardiness zone is 9a.

=== Soil ===
In the San Bernabe viticultural area, grapes are grown below the 700 feet (213 m) elevation level on rolling hills in wind-produced eolian soils. The Oceano, Garey, and Garey-Oceano complex eolian soil types, which are well to excessively well-drained, dominate the San Bernabe viticultural area. Small niches of alluvial soils, derived from the shale-based Santa Lucia Mountains, lie within the area and immediately to the north and south of the San Bernabe boundary lines. The larger, surrounding Monterey viticultural area consists of only 1.6 percent eolian soils, and the alluvial Lockwood series soils dominate the adjacent San Lucas viticultural area. The realignment area possesses a predominance of the wind-produced eolian soils that contrast to the alluvial type soils of the San Lucas area. Above and west of the 700-foot contour line, the soils are derived from the shale-based Santa Lucia Mountains. The bench soils along the east boundary are common to the Salinas River area. East of the San Bernabe viticultural area boundary line, the Gabilan Mountain Range includes calcareous sandstone, shale and siltstone, which come from a different source material, according to the petition.

== Viticulture ==
The 11,000 acres (4,452 ha) San Bernabe Vineyard estate, owned by Delicato Family Wines, has 5,000 acres (2,023 ha) cultivating grapes and sits almost entirely within the San Bernabe viticultural area. A small portion of the vineyard estate, outside the San Bernabe boundaries, is unsuitable for grape cultivation. According to the Delicato Family Vineyards petition, the San Bernabe vineyard estate is recognized as the largest continuous vineyard estate under a single ownership in the world. However, company officials later said it's likely number three, behind Caviro in Italy and Bodegas Virgen de las Viñas in Spain.
