= Paicines AVA =

Appellation that designates wine in California

Coordinates: 36°43′30″N 121°15′57″W

Paicines
- Wine region
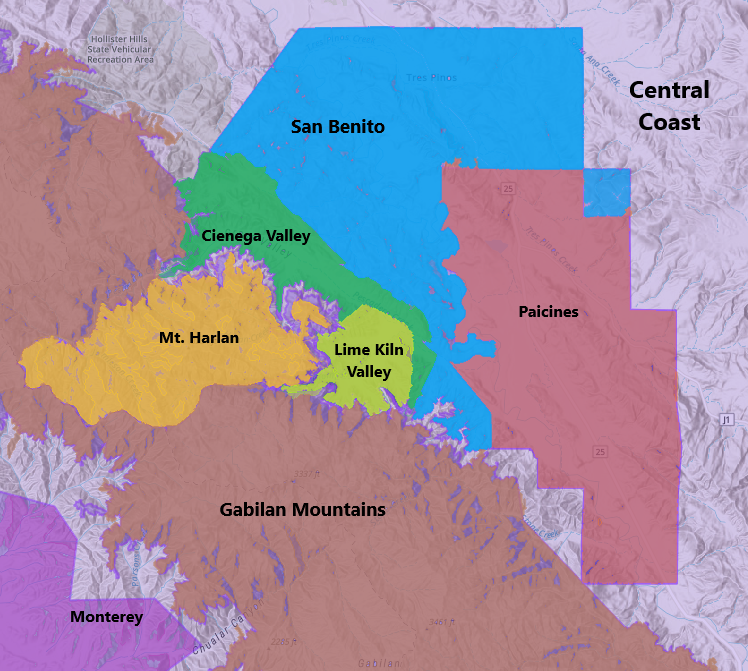
- Type: American Viticultural Area
- Year established: 1982
- Years of wine industry: 171
- Country: United States
- Part of: California, Central Coast AVA, San Benito County, San Benito AVA
- Other regions in California, Central Coast AVA, San Benito County, San Benito AVA: Cienega Valley AVA, Lime Kiln Valley AVA, Mt. Harlan AVA
- Growing season: 184 days
- Climate region: Region II
- Heat units: 2,750 GDD units
- Precipitation (annual average): 12 to 15 in (300–380 mm)
- Total area: 11,367 acres (18 sq mi)
- Size of planted vineyards: approx 4,500 acres (1,800 ha)
- No. of vineyards: 1
- Grapes produced: Assyrtiko, Arneis, Cabernet Franc, Cabernet Sauvignon, Chardonnay, Grenache, Malbec, Merlot, Pinot Noir, Petit Verdot, Syrah, Verdejo
- No. of wineries: 2

Paicines (//paɪˈsiːnz// pah-SEE-nees) is an American Viticultural Area (AVA) located in southwestern San Benito County, California named after the quaint town of Paicines within the wine region. It is a sub-appellation within the vast multi-county Central Coast viticultural area and the San Benito AVA located in the central part of the county. It was established as the nation's fifteenth, the state's tenth and the county’s second appellation on August 16, 1982 by the Bureau of Alcohol, Tobacco and Firearms (ATF), Treasury after reviewing the petition submitted by Almadén Vineyards to establish a viticultural area in San Benito County, California, to be named "Paicines."

The viticultural area encompasses a valley landform separated from Monterey County by the Gabilan Mountain Range, which is home to the Gabilan Mountain and Chalone viticultural areas further south. It is about 17 mi (27 km) of Pinnacles National Park and consists of about 4,500 acres (1,800 ha) of grape-growing area. On the western side are the Cienega Valley vineyards and the Gabilan Mountain Range which separates Paicines from San Lucas and King City. The San Luis Dam and Pacheco are on the northeast side, with New Idria and the Panoche Valley are on the eastern edge. The San Benito River forms a portion of the western boundary and continues on through the vineyards. The Paicines area is warmer than other nearby viticultural areas in San Benito County, but cooler than the wine appellations in the Central Valley.

== History ==
The area was inhabited by people between 12,000 and 15,000 years ago. It consisted of different Indian tribes or families living in this part of California. These ancestors sustained themselves and lived on the landscape between 800 and 1000 generations. With the excellent weather and location, the indigenous Indians foraged the landscape for food, fiber, medicine, fuel, and shelter. This may have been the mostly densely populated place in the Americas north of the Mexican border. Along the coastal mountain range were the Costanoan tribe, in San Juan Valley were the Ausaymas and Mutsun families, in Paicines, the Paicine tribe, and in the valley east of the Pinnacles, the Chalon tribe. Spanish explorers arrived here in the second half of the 18th century, but did not establish settlements until the Mission system began in 1769. The missions that most impacted the residents of this area were started in Santa Cruz in 1791 and in Mission San Juan Bautista in 1797. Though there were few Spaniards in the area, each mission controlled vast swaths of land, which were managed to support the mission and generate wealth to be sent to Europe. The Spanish brought their domesticated livestock and seeds from Spain, which also has a Mediterranean climate. Mexico won its independence in 1821 and the missions were secularized by 1835. The land that had been granted to the Roman Catholic Church was claimed by Mexico and then granted to Mexican citizens in large tracts of land known as ranchos. Many of the indigenous people who were converted and labored in the missions also worked on the ranchos. Paicines originated in a community that arose on Rancho Ciénega de los Paicines, a Mexican land grant issued by Governor Juan Bautista Alvarado in 1842 to Ángel María Castro and José Antonio Rodríguez that is currently the Paicines Ranch. Castro was part of the guard at the mission in San Juan Bautista and was married to the majordomo's daughter. He received the grant in recognition of his service to Mexico.

The settlement at the modern location of Paicines was originally called "Tres Pinos," after a prominent grouping of three pine trees located on a nearby hill. By 1873 the Southern Pacific Railroad had been constructed to a point 5 miles (8.0 km) north of the town to a point they called Tres Pinos station, causing much confusion. In 1874 the name of the town was changed to Grogan for three months before settling on Paicines, after the Paicine tribe.
In 1873, California bandit Tiburcio Vásquez gained nationwide notoriety when he and his gang stole $2,200 from Snyder's Store in Tres Pinos. Three of the gang were killed, but Vásquez escaped. Posses began searching for Vásquez, and Governor Newton Booth placed a $1,000 reward on his head. Sheriff John H. Adams from Santa Clara County pursued the band to Southern California, but Vásquez escaped after a gunfight.

Within a few years of the land grant to Castro, California became part of the United States. By 1865, when the deeds were perfected in Washington, DC, the Paicines Ranch was owned by Alexander Grogan, an Irish speculator. His was the first of five American families who have owned the ranch since that time. It was home to the largest shorthorn cattle herd in the country around 1900.
The first grape vines were planted in the 1850s about the same time as Cienega Valley. In 1965, Almadén Vineyards had planted thousands of acres was one of the world's largest varietal vineyard providing bulk wine in the 1980s and 90s. The Paicines area has, for many years, provided a major supply of varietal grapes to the wineries for making Almadén's premium wines and was expanded to about 4,500 acres (1,800 ha) consisting of approximately 17 different varieties of grapes. Almadén has been using Paicines on its labels since 1959.

== Terroir ==
The Paicines area is in a wind tunnel of cool ocean air flowing to the San Joaquin Valley. Because of the relative lack of trees adjacent to the vineyard areas, the Paicines area is open to the direct influence of these winds. In the afternoon, Paicines takes advantage of the slight cooling breeze that comes in off the Monterey Valley. At night Paicines is more protected from the evening fog than much of the surrounding area because of its open location. However, on a really foggy day, the Paicines area holds the fog longer than much of the nearby area, including Cienega Valley.
Elevation ranges from 500 to 1,200 ft (150–370 m) above sea level. The average elevation is lower than much of the surrounding area which is closer to the Gabilan Mountain Range. The rainfall pattern in the Paicines area differs greatly from the area surrounding the Gabilan Mountain Range. Due to the greater distance of the Paicines area from the Gabilan Mountains, Paicines often gets less rain than much of the area closer to the Gabilan Mountain Range. Annual rainfall in the Paicines area is between 12 and 15 in (300–380 mm).
During winter the relative humidity in the Paicines area is more than 50 percent most of the time. In spring the relative humidity averages 60 to 75 percent at night and 40 to 50 percent during the day. Summers are quite dry; the average relative humidity in the daytime is about 20 to 25 percent. In fall, readings-of 45 to 60 percent are common at night, but during the day readings generally range from 30 to 50 percent. The ten-year average temperature is around 2750 degree-days (GDD). The warm days and cool evenings of this region create an ideal climate for the growing of grapes. The USDA plant hardiness zones are 9a and 9b.
The Paicines area is composed of various soil associations including Sorrento, Mocho, Clear-Lake, Willows, Rincon, Antioch, Diablo, Soper, San Benito and Line. The various soils in this area are generally well drained, of various depths, and root zones are quite deep. There are some sandy alluvial fans and terrace escarpments with rapid runoff.

== Viticulture ==
Paicines viticultural area is home to the Vista Verde Vineyard, a 500 acres (202 ha) vineyard once owned by the giant Almadén Vineyards before the company was sold and segmented in the 1980s. The region previously was host to the wine brands Almadén and Paul Masson, both bought in 2008 by The Wine Group (TWG) from Constellation Brands. In 2023, TWG further purchased the approximately 1,300 acres (530 ha) Paicines Vineyards expanding its presence in the region.
