= San Benito AVA =

Appellation that designates wine in San Benito County, California

Coordinates: 36°43′34″N 121°21′29″W

San Benito
- Wine region
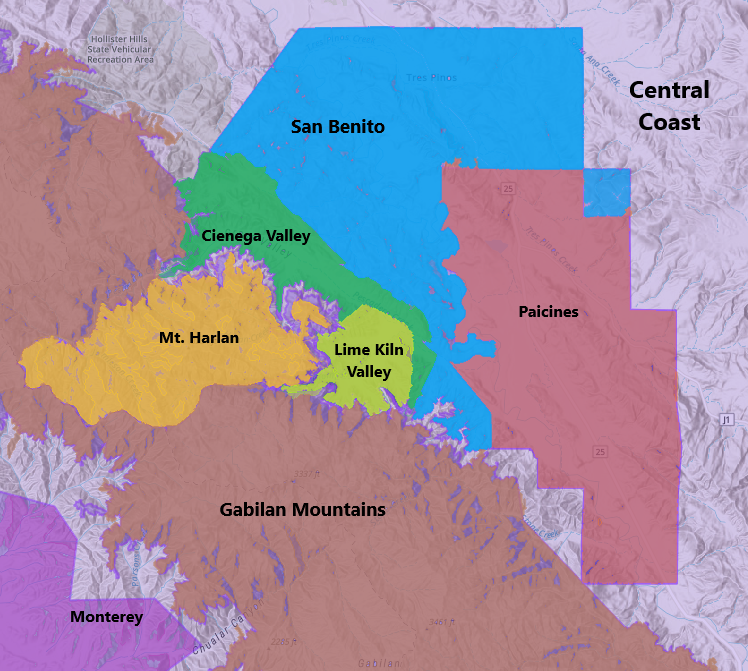
- Type: American Viticultural Area
- Year established: 1987
- Years of wine industry: 176
- Country: United States
- Part of: California, Central Coast AVA, San Benito County
- Other regions in California, Central Coast AVA, San Benito County: Gabilan Mountains AVA, Chalone AVA, Mt. Harlan AVA, Pacheco Pass AVA, Santa Clara Valley AVA, San Francisco Bay AVA
- Sub-regions: Cienega Valley AVA, Lime Kiln Valley AVA, Paicines AVA
- Growing season: 184 days
- Precipitation (annual average): 12.86 inches (327 mm)
- Total area: 45,000 acres (70 sq mi)
- Size of planted vineyards: 3,000 acres (1,200 ha)
- Grapes produced: Barbera, Chardonnay, Grenache, Merlot, Mourvedre, Syrah, Tempranillo
- Varietals produced: 23
- No. of wineries: 3

San Benito is an American Viticultural Area (AVA) located in San Benito County, California. It was established as the nation's 95^{th}, the state's 55^{th} and county's seventh wine appellation on October 5, 1987 by the Bureau of Alcohol, Tobacco and Firearms (ATF), Treasury after evaluating the petition submitted by Almadén Vineyards, a winery and grape grower in the area, proposing that a portion of San Benito County be established as a viticultural area to be known as "San Benito."

The viticultural area is located along and near the San Benito River, approximately two miles (3.2 km) south of Hollister. The area encompasses approximately 45,000 acres (70 sq mi) of which about 3,000 acres (1,200 ha) are cultivated. The petitioner stated that at least three major wineries were operating within the area, and that approximately 23 different varieties of winegrapes are grown there. San Benito AVA lies within the vast mulit-county Central Coast viticultural area and contains within its approved boundaries the established Paicines, Cienega Valley, and Lime Kiln Valley viticultural areas. San Benito has a moderate climate with cooling maritime breezes from the Pacific Ocean flowing through the gaps and valleys between the Gabilan Range and the Santa Lucia Mountains. The region was the principal source of grapes for Almadén Vineyards before the business was acquired by Constellation Brands in 1984.

== Name Origin ==
There is historic association of the name "San Benito" with the new viticultural area. The San Benito River flows through the area, and one of the principal streets of nearby Hollister was already called "San Benito Street" in 1874, when the surrounding territory, including the viticultural area, was organized as "San Benito County." The town of San Benito is about 15 miles (24 km) southeast of the area, and San Benito Mountain is about 30 miles (48 km) farther southeast, near the source of the San Benito River and the eastern boundary of San Benito County.

== History ==
The history of viticulture in the area was described by John P. Ohrwall in a talk given to the San Benito County Historical Society on July 29, 1965. A copy of the talk was submitted to ATF by the petitioner. In that talk, Mr. Ohrwall related that the first vineyard in San Benito County was planted near the new viticultural area by Theophile Vache in the early 1850s. Other vineyards were planted too, and the area where vineyards were sited became known locally as the "Vineyard District." Before the end of the nineteenth century, the vineyard planted by Vache had been named "San Benito Vineyard," and, under that name, wines made in the area "were said to have won prizes at various expositions and fairs, including some held in France and Italy" (quote from Ohrwall). Gradually, additional vineyards and wineries were established. In the 1950s, Almadén Vineyards arrived and began greatly expanding the area's grape acreage. Almadén soon became the dominant grape grower in the area. Unfortunately, the original vineyard planted by Theophile Vache is no longer in production, because the soil in that vicinity has become permeated with boron salts. Thus, the original "San Benito Vineyard" is excluded from the new viticultural area for a geographical reason, but the name that this vineyard gave to the area remains.

== Terroir ==
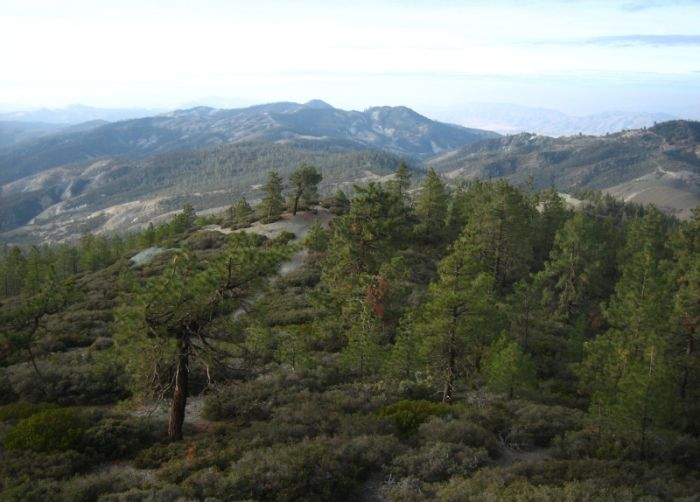
San Benito Mountain

The San Benito viticultural area is distinguished geographically from the surrounding areas, as follows:

- (a) To the north, the area is distinguished from the Hollister Valley by a relative absence of fog. There are presently few or no grapes grown in the Hollister Valley, but if there were, according to the petitioner, they would be of different character from grapes grown in the "San Benito" area. According to the petitioner, "Even an extra hour of fog daily, which is the situation around Hollister, can create a different characteristic in the wine. The grapes would be slower ripening and would result in higher acid."
- (b) Additionally, the viticultural area is distinguished from certain areas to its north and northeast which are burdened, to quote the petitioner, with "a high amount of boron in the water which deforms and destroys the leaves the vines cannot grow properly and the grapes cannot ripen." This area of boron contamination includes the site of the original "San Benito Vineyard." Boron contamination is a natural feature of the subsoil north of the "San Benito" viticultural area. Groundwater percolating through this subsoil dissolves some of the boron salts. If such groundwater is later drawn up through wells and used for irrigation, boron contamination begins to build up in the topsoil. This apparently is what happened over a period of years in the original "San Benito Vineyard" land. Although famous for grapes for over 50 years, that land today is unsuitable for viticulture. By contrast, vineyards located inside the new viticultural area are irrigated by water from "deep wells with an extremely low level of boron. There is no toxicity and this condition is monitored on a yearly basis."
- (c) The eastern, southern, and western boundaries of the area correspond closely to a climatic change as indicated Federal Register / Vol. 52, No. 192 / Monday, October 5, 1987 / Rules and Regulations in Western Garden Book, published by Sunset Books. According to this book, the area inside the viticultural area is an "inland area with some ocean influence" which moderates the climate. By contrast, the surrounding areas to the east, south, and west are designated in the book as areas with more "sharply defined seasons," due to their higher elevations.
- (d) Distinctions to the east and west, and to a lesser extent to the south as well, exist on the basis of topography. Those neighboring areas are, for the most part, too steep to be suitable for viticulture. This topographic distinction is apparent from examination of the applicable U.S.G.S. maps.
- (e) Finally, the mountain areas to the east and west of the viticultural area would generally be too cold for viticulture, according to a statement made to ATF by the University of California Farm Advisor for San Benito County.

The USDA plant hardiness zone ranges from 9a to 9b.

== Industry ==
Although there are some scattered grape plantings elsewhere is San Benito County, by far the preponderance of viticulture in that county is practiced in the viticultural area established by this ATF decision. According to the petition, 95 percent of the vinifera grapes from San Benito County are grown in this area. The other 5 percent are grown in other areas with different climates, according to the petitioner, who declared, "We are not aware of any other area within San Benito County that could be known as "San Benito" or that would have comparable climatic and growing conditions." ATF agrees with these assertions, since it appears likely that much of the other 5 percent of the vinifera in San Benito County is planted in the already-established Pacheco Pass viticultural area (located north of Hollister, straddling the border of San Benito and Santa Clara counties). Further evidence was offered by the petitioner, concerning its use of the name "San Benito" on wine labels. Since 1959, labels have appeared on wines of the petitioner, made from grapes from the viticultural area, indicating "San Benito" or "San Benito County" as the appellation of origin.
