= Gabilan Mountains AVA =

Appellation that designates wine in Monterey County, CA

Coordinates: 36°36′36″N 121°22′30″W

Gabilan Mountains
- Wine region
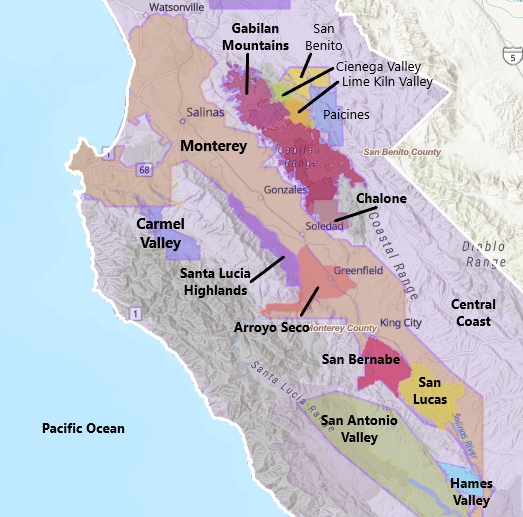
- Type: American Viticultural Area
- Year established: 2022
- Years of wine industry: 107
- Country: United States
- Part of: California, Central Coast AVA, Monterey county, San Benito County
- Other regions in California, Central Coast AVA, Monterey county, San Benito County: Carmel Valley AVA, Arroyo Seco AVA, Hames Valley AVA, Monterey AVA, San Antonio Valley AVA
- Sub-regions: Chalone AVA, Mt. Harlan AVA
- Growing season: 292 days
- Climate region: Region I and III
- Precipitation (annual average): 17.24 in (437.90 mm)
- Soil conditions: Moderately coarse textured soil over granite bedrock, Sheridan-Cieneba-Auberry, high limestone content
- Total area: 98,000 acres (153 sq mi)
- Size of planted vineyards: 436 acres (176 ha)
- No. of vineyards: 4
- Grapes produced: Aligoté, Bordelaise, Cabernet Franc, Cabernet Sauvignon, Carignane, Chardonnay, Chenin Blanc, Grenache, Pinot Noir, Roussanne, Sauvignon Blanc, Semillon, Syrah, Viognier
- No. of wineries: 6

Gabilan Mountains (//ɡæˈbiːlən// GAB-uh-lan) is an American Viticultural Area (AVA) located in the mountainous region on the border in Monterey and San Benito Counties in California. The appellation was established as the nation's 267^{th}, the state's 147^{th} and the county's tenth AVA on August 15, 2022 by the Alcohol and Tobacco Tax and Trade Bureau (TTB), Treasury after reviewing the petition submitted by Parker Allen of Coastview Vineyards, proposing the viticultural area named "Gabilan Mountains."

The appellation encompasses about 98,000 acres (153 sq mi) including the established Mt. Harlan and Chalone AVAs, and resident to 4 wineries and 6 commercial vineyards cultivating approximately 436 acres (176 ha). The average elevation within the region is 2,370 feet (720 m) placing it above the heavy fog and marine layer. As a result, Gabilan Mountains AVA has a cool air climate without the humidity from the fog and low-lying clouds. The plant hardiness zone ranges from 9a to 10a.

== History ==
In 1919, French immigrant and entrepreneur, Charles L. Tamm, traveled through California searching for the terroir with limestone soil similar to his native Burgundy. He found a property in Monterey County which is currently Chalone Vineyard. On the north slope of Chalone Peak at 1,800 feet (550 m), Tamm planted Chenin Blanc sourcing for wineries even during Prohibition, when the grapes were used to make sacramental wines. Winegrowing, however, never became important in Monterey County because it was considered a "poor area" for viticulture. Strong winds off Monterey Bay and the arid climate of the Salinas River Valley deterred the planting of wine grapes. During Prohibition, only 400 acres (160 ha) of vineyards survived in Monterey County and this acreage was halved in the years following Repeal. Later, Chalone Vineyard grew and its grapes were sold in the 1940s and '50s to Almaden Vineyards and Wente Brothers. In 1946, Chalone vineyards were expanded by its subsequent owner, William Silvear, with more Chardonnay and Chenin Blanc plus newly planted Pinot Blanc and Pinot Noir.

In the early 1960s, the modern era of viticulture took root and Monterey County gained prominence as a wine-producing region. By the late 1960s and early 1970s, the quality of some California wines was outstanding but few took notice as the market favored French brands. At the legendary Paris Wine Tasting of 1976 on May 24, Chalone Vineyard's 1974 Chardonnay ranked 3rd in the white wine category scored predominantly by renown French oenophiles. The identical vintage ranked "1st Place" in a repeat event at the San Francisco Wine Tasting of 1978.

In 1974, vintner Josh Jensen purchased a limestone-rich parcel near Mt. Harlan in San Benito County located 100 miles (161 km) south of San Francisco and about 37 miles (60 km) inland from the Pacific coastline. The property was formerly an early 20th-century limestone quarry and at 2,000 feet (610 m) above sea level, Calera Wine Company is one of the most elevated cool-climate vineyards in California.

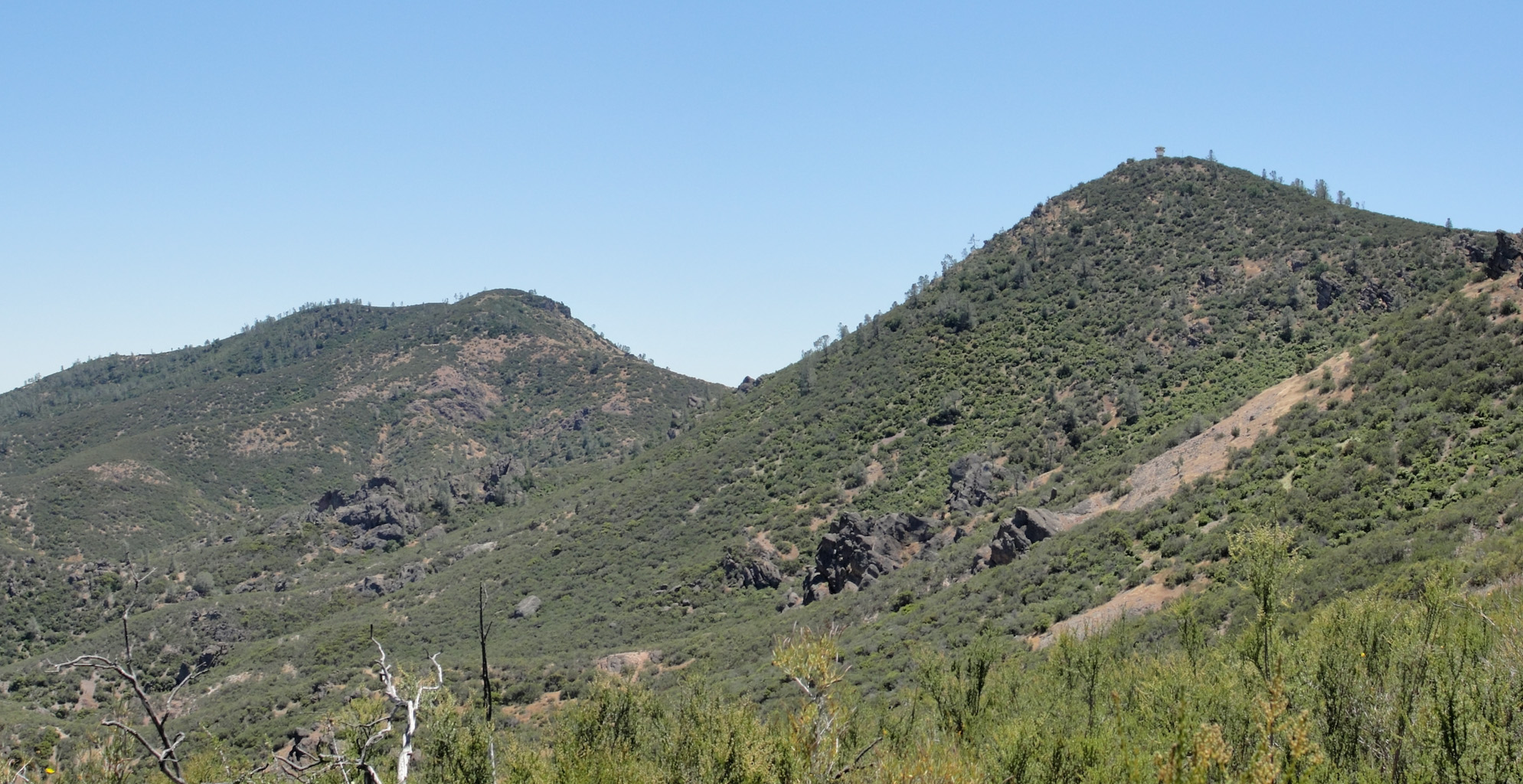
South and North Chalone Peaks of the Gabilan Range

== Terroir ==
=== Elevation ===
The distinguishing features of the Gabilan Mountains AVA are its elevation, climate, and soils. The area is located in the Gabilan Range mountainous region with high elevations. According to the petition, the average elevation within the AVA is 2,370 feet (722 m). By contrast, all surrounding regions have lower elevations. To the north, the average elevation in the Santa Clara Valley AVA is 345 feet (105 m). The average elevation within the established Arroyo Seco AVA, located to the south, is 331 feet (101 m). To the east of the AVA, the average elevation ranges from 778 feet (237 m) within the established Paicines AVA and 1,105 feet (337 m) within the Cienega Valley AVA. West of Gabilan Mountains, the average elevation ranges from 480 feet (146 m) in the enlongated Monterey AVA to 512 feet (156 m) within the existing Santa Lucia Highlands AVA. Gabilan Mountains higher elevations place it above the heavy fog and marine layer. As a result, its cool climate lacks the humidity from the fog and low-lying clouds. The lower humidity levels significantly reduce mildew pressure, which allows growers to use less fungicide and pursue more organic practices during the growing season.

=== Climate ===
The climate of the Gabilan Mountains viticultural area distinguishes it from the surrounding regions, particularly with respect to fog and rainfall. The area averages fewer than 2.5 hours of fog and low clouds per day each year during the months of June through September. The regions to the west and north of the AVA each average nine hours of fog and low cloud cover daily, while the region to the south averages seven hours. Paicines, to the east and sheltered from the marine air by the Hollister Hills, receives an average of only 2 hours of fog and low cloud cover daily. The low amounts of fog and lack of low clouds allow grapevines more access to direct sunlight, which assists photosynthesis of the vines for proper maturation. The lack of fog and low clouds also reduces the amount of humidity in Gabilan Mountains, reducing the chance of mildew developing in the vineyards. Although the AVA has less fog and low cloud cover than most of the surrounding regions, annual rainfall amounts within Gabilan Mountains are higher. The area receives an average 17.24 inches (437.90 mm)of rain each year, with over 12 inches (305 mm) of that falling during the fall and winter months. The region to the north averages 14.19 inches (360.43 mm) annually, while the region to the east receives 16.06 inches (407.92 mm). To its south, the average annual rainfall total is 12.06 inches (306.32 mm), and the amount for the region to the west is 12.83 inches (325.88 mm). Higher rainfall amounts during the fall and winter months act to clear the soil and send nutrients and carbohydrates to the dormant vines' roots. Within the AVA, the drier summers reduce the risk of moisture-related diseases damaging the fruit and keep the sugars and acids balanced closer to harvest.

=== Soil ===
The soils of Gabilan Mountains AVA are moderately coarse textured soils over a granite bedrock. It is rich in calcium due to the high limestone content. The high calcium content causes grapes to carry acid later into the growing season, allowing growers to let the grapes remain on the vines longer so that they reach physiological ripeness. The soils are primarily from the Sheridan-Cieneba-Auberry association and are well-drained to excessively drained. According to the petition, the quick-draining soils cause stress to the vines during the growing season, resulting in intense flavors and rich, hardy skins that are less frequently associated with vines grown in poorly drained soils. By contrast, the soils to the east and west of the Gabilan Mountains AVA are medium textured soils on floodplains and alluvial fans. The soils east of the AVA are primarily from the San Benito-Gazos-Linne association.

TTB determined that the Gabilan Mountains AVA will remain part of the established Central Coast AVA as Gabilan Mountains AVA shares some broad characteristics with the Central Coast. For example, the primary characteristic of the Central Coast AVA is its marine-influenced climate, which results in higher rainfall amounts than occur in the inland valleys on the eastern side of the Coastal Ranges. Gabilan Mountains AVA also experiences higher annual rainfall amounts than the regions to the east of the Coastal Ranges. However, due to its higher elevations, the Gabilan Mountains experiences less marine fog incursion than many of the lower elevations in the Central Coast AVA. Additionally, due to its smaller size, the soils and elevations of the Gabilan Mountains AVA are less varied than those of the large, multi-county Central Coast AVA. Finally, TTB determined that the Mt. Harlan and Chalone AVAs will remain a part of the Gabilan Mountains AVA. All three AVAs are high elevation areas that experience less marine fog than the lower neighboring regions. Like the Gabilan Mountains, the Mt. Harlan contains soils of the Sheridan, Cieneba, and Auberry series, and the Chalone AVA soils contain large amounts of calcium derived from limestone. However, the Mt. Harlan and Chalone viticultural areas have characteristics that distinguish themselves from Gabilan Mountains and justify their continued existence as unique viticultural areas within the larger region. Both the Mt. Harlan and Chalone contain a narrower range of elevations due to their smaller size. Additionally, due to its proximity to the Hollister and Cienega Valleys that funnel storms in from the Pacific Ocean, Mt. Harlan AVA receives more rainfall each year than the Gabilan Mountains as a whole. However, Chalone is sheltered from the Pacific storms by the Santa Lucia Mountains and receives less rainfall annually than Gabilan Mountains AVA as a whole.

== Industry Impact ==
The establishment of the Gabilan Mountains viticultural area does not affect the existing Central Coast, Mt. Harlan, or Chalone AVAs, and any bottlers using "Central Coast," “Mt. Harlan" or "Chalone" as an appellation of origin or in a brand name for wines made from grapes grown within those AVAs will not be affected by the establishment of this AVA. The establishment of the Gabilan Mountains AVA will allow vintners to use "Gabilan Mountains" and "Central Coast" as appellations of origin for wines made primarily from grapes grown within the Gabilan Mountains AVA if the wines meet the eligibility requirements for these appellations. Additionally, vintners may use "Gabilan Mountains" as an appellation of origin in addition to or in place of "Mt. Harlan" or "Chalone" for wines made primarily from grapes grown in the Mt. Harlan or Chalone AVAs if the wines meet the eligibility requirements for either of these appellations.
