= Mt. Harlan AVA =

Viticultural area in San Benito County, California

Coordinates: 36°43′31″N 121°21′30″W

Mt. Harlan
- Wine region
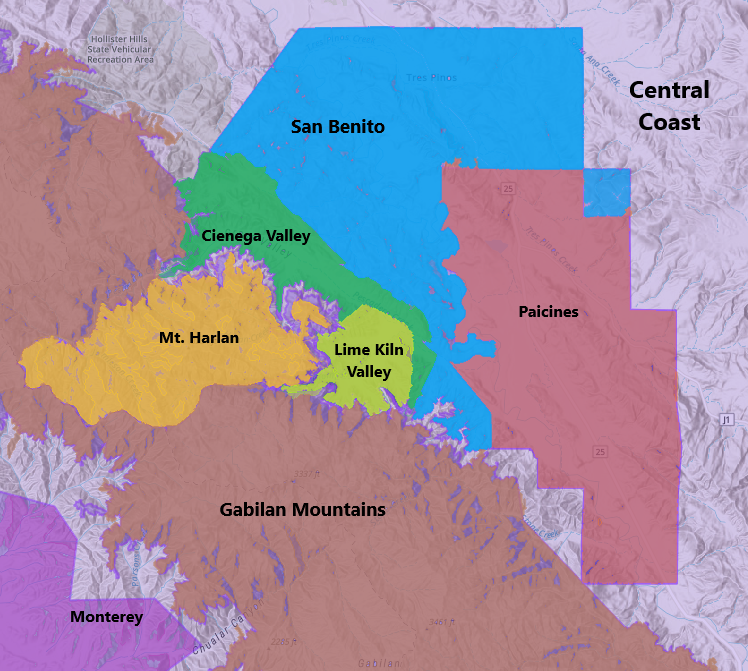
- Type: American Viticultural Area
- Year established: 1990
- Years of wine industry: 55
- Country: United States
- Part of: California, Central Coast AVA, San Benito County, Gabilan Mountains AVA
- Precipitation (annual average): 35 to 40 in (890–1,020 mm)
- Total area: 7,440 acres (12 sq mi)
- Size of planted vineyards: 100 acres (40 ha)
- No. of vineyards: 9
- Grapes produced: Aligote, Chardonnay, Pinot noir, Viognier
- No. of wineries: 1

Mt. Harlan is an American Viticultural Area (AVA) located in San Benito County, California. It lies within the Gabilan Mountains viticultural area and the state's vast multi-county Central Coast AVA. It was established as the nation's 108^{th}, the state's 63^{rdh} and the county’s eighth appellation on November 15, 1990 by the Bureau of Alcohol, Tobacco and Firearms (ATF) after reviewing the petition submitted by Josh Jensen of Calera Wine Company proposing a viticultural area known as "Mt. Harlan."

The viticultural area lies inland at elevations of 1,800 to 2,200 feet (550–670 m) approximately twenty-five miles (40 km) east of Monterey Bay and nine miles (14 km) south of the city of Hollister. Mt. Harlan is a prominent 3,274 feet (998 m) peak, and is in the upper elevations of the short Gabilan Mountain Range (also known as Gavilan), whose watershed serves as the boundary line between San Benito and Monterey counties. The eastern border of the Mt. Harlan viticultural area nearly abuts the established viticultural areas of "Cienega Valley," "Lime Kiln Valley" and "San Benito," but remains independent. The combined effects of unique soil composition, elevation and microclimate upon the production of grapes grown in the Mt. Harlan viticultural area distinguishes it from the other viticultural areas in San Benito County which lie at lower elevations. The vineyards on Mt. Harlan belong to one commercial winery, Josh Jensen's Calera Wine Company. "Calera," is the Spanish word (/kaˈleɾa/ ka-LE-ra) for "lime kiln", as the reminder of the local limestone quarries a century ago. A historic, well-preserved 30 feet (9.1 m) tall masonry lime kiln stands on one of Calera's vineyard properties.

== History ==
"Mt. Harlan" is named for Ulysses Grant Harlan, a rancher who settled in the northwestern region of San Benito County between 1860 and 1880. A map produced by the Department of the Interior in 1884 shows the location of two homesites for U.G. Harlan in this area: "Harlan's Cabin" in section 28, Township 14 South, Range 5 East; and "Harlan's Upper Cabin", in section 23 of the same township and range. The Harlan family was well established in the area by 1884. There are direct descendants of Ulysses Grant Harlan in the area to this day.

== Terroir ==
=== Topography ===
Mt. Harlan viticultural area consists of approximately 7,440 acres (12 sq mi) and measures six miles (9.7 km) at its widest point east–west and three miles (5 km) north-south. Total vineyard acreage at this time consists of 44 acres (18 ha) with plans to establish more than an additional 100 acres (40 ha). Both the planned and current vineyards are planted at an elevation of around 2,200 feet (671 m) distinguishing them from any other vineyards in San Benito County.

=== Climate ===
The vineyards around Mt. Harlan are located at an elevation of around 2,200 feet (671 m) where special microclimatic conditions exist. The Mt. Harlan viticultural area is distinguished from the lower elevations and valley floor by cooler temperatures, less incidence of fog, and higher rainfall with less danger of frost as a result of differing air drainage on upland and lowland areas. According to the Soil Survey of San Benito County (hereafter, Soil Survey), the average annual temperature within the Mt. Harlan viticultural area is between 56 and 60 °F (13–16 °C). This contrasts with the warmer average annual temperatures of Lime Kiln and Cienega Valleys to the northeast 60 and 62 °F (16–17 °C). This dissimilarity in temperature translates into differing maturation periods for mountain grapes and valley grapes.
In the mountains, the cooler temperatures retard the ripening of the grapes. Therefore, more time is required for the grapes to reach acceptable sugar levels. The warmer temperatures of the valley floor allow the varieties planted there to ripen earlier. Generally, harvest will occur two to four weeks later in Mt. Harlan than in Lime Kiln and Cienega Valleys. This difference in harvest dates further distinguishes the Mt. Harlan viticultural area from its immediate neighbors to the east. Fog also piays a major role in distinguishing the Mt. Harlan viticultural area. Because of the higher elevations at Mt. Harlan, fog is not nearly so prevalent as it is in Cienega and Lime Kiln Valleys. As the air over the California Central Valley heats each morning, it rises, creating a suction effect that pulls the moist Pacific Ocean air inland. The Gabilan Range acts as a natural barrier to this eastward flowing cool air, keeping the cooling, moist breezes west of the valley areas. Yet the Pacific air from Monterey Bay flows into the interior through Chittenden Pass and Pacheco Pass, bringing the effects of fog and moist air through San Benito County and into the Central Valley. As the fog enters Cienega and Lime Kiln Valleys it may often reach the 1,400 ft (430 m) elevation. At the same time that vineyards in Cienega and Lime Kiln Valleys are blanketed under fog, the vineyards on Mt. Harlan are exposed to full sun. When the fog occasionally does reach the mountain vineyards, it burns off early in the morning, sometimes a full two hours ahead of the valley. The result is more hours of sunlight on Mt. Harlan than in the valleys. Rainfall also distinguishes the Mt. Harlan viticultural area from the neighboring viticultural areas. The disparity in rainfall between Cienega/Lime Kiln Valleys, 16 inches (406 mm) annually, and Mt. Harlan, 35 to 40 inches (889–1,016 mm) annually, is a major point of distinction. The USDA plant hardiness zones are 9a and 9b.

=== Soil ===
In Lime Kiln Valley and Cienega Valley the dominant soil series comprising the vineyards is the Hanford series. The Soil Survey characterizes this series as lowland soils which are "nearly level to sloping" and as "occurring on flood plains and fans." They occur primarily in the larger valleys. According to the Soil Survey, bedrock or hardpan is always reached at depths greater than five feet. The average depth of these soils is 70 inches (178 cm). The available water holding capacity ranges from 7.5 to 8.5 inches (19.1 to 21.6 cm) per representative soil profile. Because they are lowland soils, they exhibit very slow runoff and only slight to moderate erosion potential. In contrast to the lowland soils which are present in Lime Kiln Valley and Cienega Valley, upland soils of the Sheridan series comprise nearly 70% of the soils in the Mt. Harlan viticultural area. These are mountainous soils which, as noted in the Soil Survey, occur west of Cienega Road and northwest of Lime Kiln Road. Bedrock or hardpan may be reached in as little as 1.5 feet (0.5 m) from the surface. The average soil depth is 3.5 feet (1.1 m). The runoff is rapid, a natural result of the slope and elevation of the area (anywhere from 15%-75% slope). Therefore, the available water holding capacity ranges from 2 to 7 inches (5.1–17.8 cm) per representative profile. Concomitantly, the erosion potential is severe to very severe. Associated with the Sheridan soils are the Cieneba and Aubefry series which together make up the remaining 30% of the soils in the Mt. Harlan viticultural area. Both associated series are upland soils with similar slope to the Sheridan series (15% - 75%). All three soil series exhibit similar erosion potential and available water holding capacity. In addition to the uniformity of its soil characteristics, Mt. Harlan contains an important and distinguishing geological feature, the presence of limestone, which is the area's defining characteristic reminiscent of Burgundy. In discussing the Cieneba soils series, the Soil Survey, notes that there "are a few small areas of limestone in the mountains to the west of Cienega Road." In addition, the Soil Survey notes that within the Sheridan series are "areas of soils underlain by limestone." A special report issued by the California Division of Mines corroborates the findings of the soil survey. "Limestone deposits of different sizes are found in the Mt. Harlan vicinity of Cienega Valley between Pescadero Canyon and McPhails Peak." These citations place outcroppings of limestone within the Mt. Harlan viticultural area and not within Cienega Valley or Lime Kiln Valley in which the soils overlie a bedrock of limestone and dolomite.

== Viticulture ==
Mt. Harlan's viticulture history begins in 1971, when vintner Josh Jensen took on the challenge from his mentors in Burgundy, who were adamant that pinot noir and chardonnay must be grown in limestone-rich soils, searched for the California equivalent. He established a remote high-altitude section in San Benito County's Gabilan Mountains on former limestone quarries, the 7,400 acres (12 sq mi) property cultivating approximately 100 acres (40 ha). The vines all grow on limestone soil reminiscent of Côte-d'Or which is the area's defining characteristic,
