= Meritage =

Bordeaux-style wines

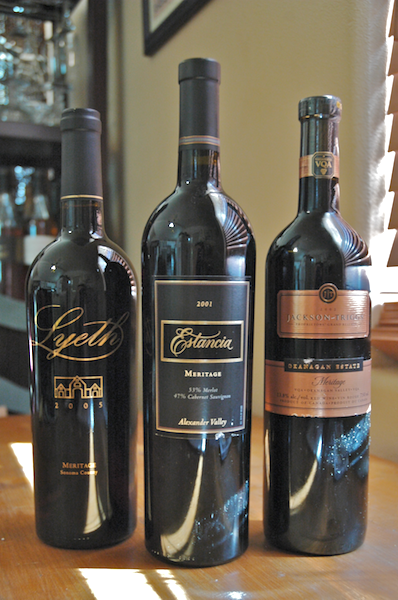
Three different Meritage wines: a 2005 Lyeth Sonoma County, a 2001 Estancia Alexander Valley, and a 2002 Jackson-Triggs Okanagan Valley.

Meritage is a name for red and white Bordeaux-style wines without infringing on the Bordeaux (France) region's legally protected designation of origin. Winemakers must license the Meritage trademark from its owner, the California-based Meritage Alliance. Member wineries are found principally in the United States, though increasingly elsewhere.

== History ==
The Meritage Association was formed in 1988 by a small group of Sonoma County and Napa Valley, California vintners increasingly frustrated by U.S. Bureau of Alcohol, Tobacco, Firearms, and Explosives regulations stipulating wines containing at least 75 percent of a specific grape to be labeled as a varietal. As interest grew in creating Bordeaux-style wines, which by their blended nature fail to qualify for varietal status, members sought to create a recognizable name for their blended wines.

In 1988, the association hosted a contest to conceive a proprietary name for these wines, receiving over 6,000 submissions. "Meritage"—a portmanteau of merit and heritage—was selected and its coiner awarded two bottles of the first ten vintages of every wine licensed to use the brand.

The first wine to be labeled with the term "Meritage" was the 1986 "The Poet" by Mitch Cosentino (Cosentino Winery) and 1985 vintage by Dry Creek Vineyard was the oldest vintage released "Meritage".

By 1999, the Meritage Association had grown to 22 members. Shifting its focus from trademark policing to education and marketing resulted in swift growth. By 2003, the Association had over 100 members, including its first international participants. In May 2009, the Meritage Association announced that it had changed its name to the Meritage Alliance. As of July 2014, the Alliance had over 350 members.

== Trademark licensing and wine production ==
The Meritage agreement stipulates the blends that can be labeled "Meritage", a fee per case (currently $1.00, capped at $500.00 per vintage), and various labeling restrictions.

A red Meritage must be made from a blend of at least two of the following varieties: Cabernet Sauvignon, Merlot, Cabernet Franc, Malbec, Petit Verdot, St. Macaire, Gros Verdot, or Carmenère, with no variety comprising more than 90 percent of the blend.

A white Meritage must be made from a blend of at least two or more of the following varieties: Sauvignon blanc, Sémillon, or Muscadelle du Bordelais, with no variety comprising more than 90 percent of the blend.

Although not stipulated by the licensing agreement, the Meritage Alliance strongly recommends that wineries label only their best blend Meritage and limit production to no more than 25,000 cases.

Unlike regulations like French AOC, there are no mandatory rules related to winemaking or winegrowing.

== Pronunciation ==
Although many people, including many wine experts, have a tendency to Frenchify the word "Meritage" by pronouncing its last syllable with a "zh" sound, as in the U.S. pronunciation of "garage", the Meritage Alliance specifically states that the word should be pronounced to rhyme with "heritage". Meritage should be pronounced /ˈmɛrɪtɪdʒ/.
