= Cienega Valley AVA =

Appellation that designates wine in California

Coordinates: 36°44′57″N 121°23′27″W

Cienega Valley
- Wine region
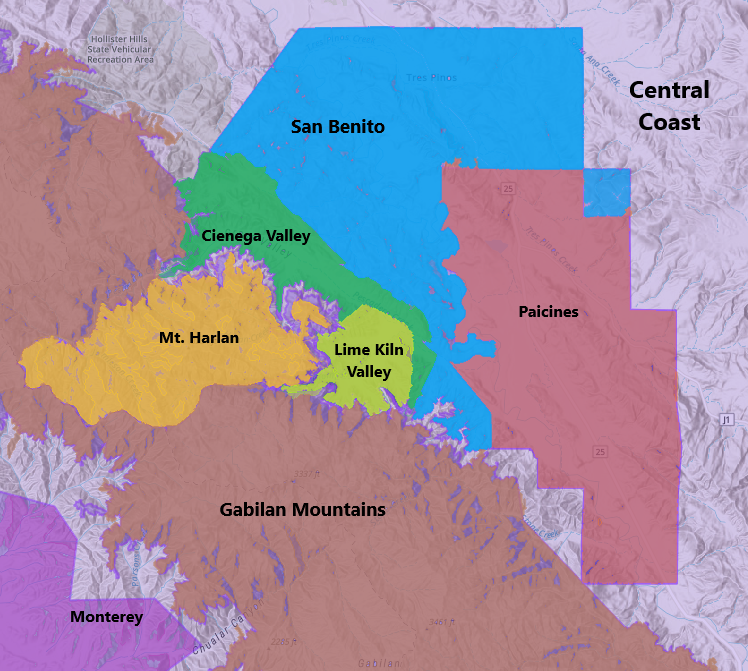
- Type: American Viticultural Area
- Year established: 1982
- Years of wine industry: 174
- Country: United States
- Part of: California, Central Coast AVA, San Benito County, San Benito AVA
- Other regions in California, Central Coast AVA, San Benito County, San Benito AVA: Mt. Harlan AVA, Paicines AVA
- Sub-regions: Lime Kiln Valley AVA
- Growing season: 265 days
- Climate region: Region II
- Heat units: 2,861 GDD units
- Precipitation (annual average): 15.29 in (388.37 mm)
- Soil conditions: loamy, generally well drained, underlain by weathered granite
- Total area: 4,201 acres (7 sq mi)
- No. of vineyards: 3
- Grapes produced: Cabernet Franc, Cabernet Pfeffer/Gros Verdot, Cabernet Sauvignon, Carignane, Chardonnay, Dolcetto, Grenache, Merlot, Negrette, Pinot Gris, Pinot Noir, Sangiovese, Syrah, Zinfandel
- No. of wineries: 13

Cienega Valley is an American Viticultural Area (AVA) located in western San Benito County, California, within the vast Central Coast viticultural area. It was established as the nation's seventeenth, the state's twelfth and the county's fourth appellation on August 19, 1982 by the Bureau of Alcohol, Tobacco and Firearms (ATF), Treasury after reviewing the petition submitted by Almadén Vineyards proposing a viticultural area in San Benito County named "Cienega Valley."

The valley was a major source of wine grapes for Almadén Vineyards since the 1950s before it was acquired by Constellation Brands in 1987. Approximately 1,100 feet (340 m) above sea level, the valley floor is divided by the San Andreas Fault. Soil on the east side of the fault is predominantly granite and sandstone, whereas soils on the west side are predominantly granite and limestone. It grows some of the oldest Pinot Noir vines in California. The viticultural area is located at the base of the Gabilan Mountain Range which rises to 3,274 ft (998 m) and forms a boundary line between San Benito and Monterey Counties. The Pescadero Creek runs through the vineyards and the San Andreas fault line borders the-northeast edge. Cienega Valley lies approximately five miles (8.0 km) south, overland, from the town of Hollister. On the east is the Paicines Vineyards. The ATF ruled that both Cienega Valley and Lime Kiln Valley viticultural areas both have enough similar characteristics to justify expanding the boundaries of Cienega Valley to include all of Lime Kiln Valley. The Cienega Valley area is planted with hundreds of acres of vineyards consisting of numerous varieties of grapes.

== History ==
San Benito County history dates back to the mid-18th century with the advent of the Spanish Catholic priests of the Franciscan order establishing the Alta California Mission system between 1769 and 1833, specifically the Mission San Juan Bautista in 1797. Cienega Valley grape vines were planted in the 1852 by Theophile Vache, a French wine merchant who immigrated from the Bordeaux region. The vineyard was sold in 1883 and the new owner planted more acreage. Historical data indicate a winery was built in 1854 and later enlarged. The quality of the wines from the region gained an international reputation by winning prizes from as far away as France and Italy. In 1907, the varietal grape growing program was updated by Professor Biolette, head professor of the Viticulture Department at the University of California, extolling the region for its limestone soil and rich, intense grapes. At the same time, Dr. John P Ohrwal became supervisor of the vineyards. Historical evidence provides that in 1914 bulk wines were sold to the California Wine Association. The petition states that during Prohibition the grape vines were not pulled and in 1935, after the Repeal, wine was made by a new owner who had acquired the winery. According to the petition, both the winery and vineyards were taken over by the Taylor Company in 1943 and later sold to Almadén Vineyards in the 1950s.

== Terroir ==
=== Topography ===
The Cienega Valley viticultural area is distinguished from surrounding areas by climatic variances and by differences in the soil. Cienega Valley lies northeast of the Salinas Valley which is known as a cooler area and is often blanketed with fog, Salinas Valley strongly influences the microclimate of the Cienega Valley by sending cooler air and fog into the Cienega grape-growing region. The terrain is extremely hilly to mountainous and the elevation ranges from approximately 930 ft (280 m) to well over 1,500 ft (460 m). The average elevation in the Cienega Valley area is higher than much of the surrounding area including Paicines.

=== Climate ===
Due to the closeness of the Cienega Valley area to the Gabilan Mountain Range, Cienega Valley often has more rain than the surrounding area, thus creating different microclimatic conditions. Rainfall average 15.29 in (388.37 mm) per year based on 53 years of records. There is some dry farming in the Valley. However, water coming down out of the Gabilan Mountains into the Pescadero Creek is used for irrigation of a portion of the vineyards. The Cienega Valley area is in a wind tunnel of cool ocean air flowing to the San Joaquin Valley. Trees growing adjacent to the vineyard area help protect the area from the wind. Also, Cienega Valley is protected from the wind due to the location of its east/west canyons. Cienega Valley gets more evening fog than much of the surrounding area because of its location at the foot of the Gabilan Mountains. This fog usually burns off by early morning.
The average heat units in the last four years is 2,861 degree-days which is Region II on the Winkler scale. The adjacent mountain range and the cool ocean air that comes into the Cienega Valley each day help create an ideal microclimate for the growing of fine, distinguished quality grapes. The USDA plant hardiness zones are 9a and 9b.

=== Soil ===
The soil is loamy, generally well drained, and often underlain by weathered granite. The main soil associations of the flood plains and alluvial fans are Sorrento-Yolo-Mocho and Clear Lake-Pacheco-Williams. The soil associations on the uplands are the San Benito-Gazos-Linne association and the Shendan-Cineba-Auberry association. In general there is good water holding capacity and the root depth ranges from medium to quite deep.

== Viticulture ==
Since the 1950s, the valley was a major source of wine grapes for Almadén Vineyards before it was acquired by Constellation Brands in 1987 and much of its Cienega assets were dismantled. This became the foundation for two wineries, as DeRose Vineyards and the Pietra Santa Winery again produced wine in the Valley. Old Almadén plots were revived including the 120-year-old Negrette vineyard and new plantings of Italian varietals were introduced.
