= Gros Verdot =

Variety of grape

Gros Verdot is a red French wine grape variety that was a historically important grape in the Gironde wine region of Bordeaux but plantings of the variety have been banned in the region since 1946 with the grape no longer being a permitted variety in any AOC Bordeaux wines.

Today the grape is not widely cultivated with limited plantings in France, Chile and California where it is an acceptable component in Bordeaux-style Meritage blends.

Despite the similar name, ampelographers believe there is no direct genetic relation between Gros Verdot and Petit Verdot.

== History ==
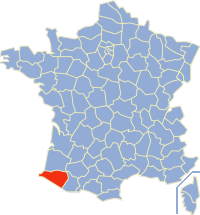
The Pyrénées-Atlantiques region where Gros Verdot is believed to have originated.

While ampelographers once believed that Gros Verdot originated with Petit Verdot in the Gironde region, DNA testing in 2007 showed that the grape likely originated as a wild grapevine domesticated in the Pyrénées-Atlantiques region. The name Verdot stems from the French word vert meaning "green" and is thought to reference the acidic, unripe flavors that the grape can have if not given a long growing season to full ripen before harvest. The term Gros means "grand" or "large", however Gros Verdot actually has smaller berries than Petit Verdot.

The earliest mention of Gros Verdot comes from a 1736 document detailing it as one of the grapes, along with Petit Verdot, that was growing in the Bordeaux wine region. In the 19th century, Gros Verdot was a prominent grape in the Queyries vineyard planted outside the city of Bordeaux on land that is now part of the Jardin botanique de la Bastide. New plantings of Gros Verdot were officially banned from the Gironde in 1946 and today it is not listed in the French government's official register of permitted grape varieties.

== Viticulture ==
Gros Verdot is a productive and high yield grape variety that, similar to Petit Verdot, requires a long ripening period. Despite the name Gros Verdot, the vine actually produces clusters of smaller berries than Petit Verdot.

Like many Vitis vinifera varieties, Gros Verdot is highly prone to phylloxera with the phylloxera epidemic of the late 19th century being partially responsible for the grape's near extinction in France. This is because Gros Verdot does not take well to the grafting process that binds the vine to American rootstock that is more tolerant to phylloxera. While viticultural advances have improved Gros Verdot's grafting tolerance it still only takes well to certain types of Vitis rupestris stocks.

== Wine regions ==
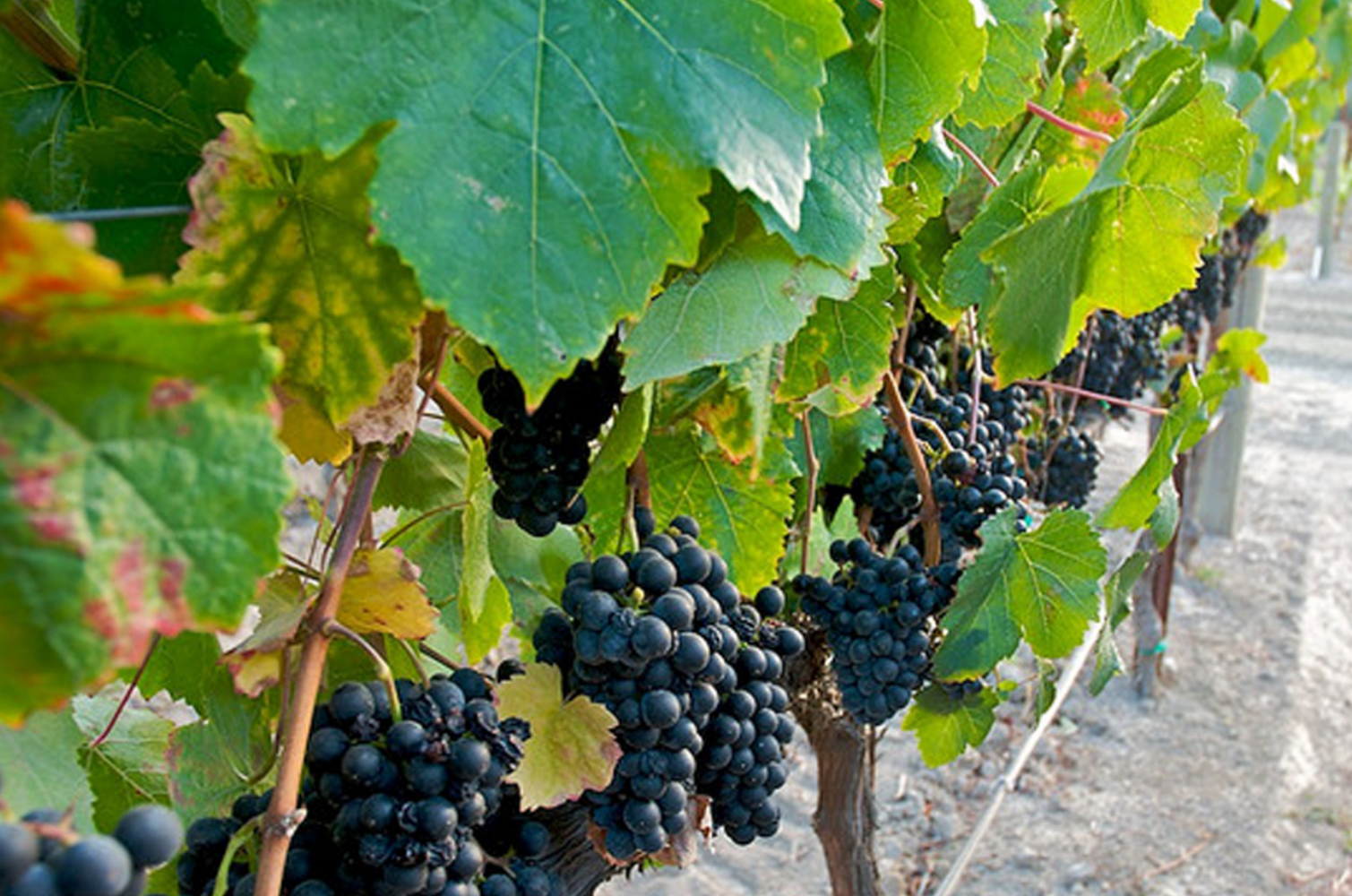
Despite having the name Gros Verdot, the grape actually produces berries smaller than Petit Verdot (pictured).

Though there are some plantings of Gros Verdot in France, since its 1946 banning its numbers have dwindled to the point where the variety is nearly extinct in its homeland. Outside France there are limited plantings in California where it is often confused with Cabernet Pfeffer (actually Mourtaou, according to the University of California at Davis Foundation Plant Services). In 2007, a vineyard first planted in 1895 and now growing grapes for Kenneth Volk Vineyards in the Lime Kiln Valley sub region of the San Benito AVA was discovered to be planted with Gros Verdot instead of Cabernet Pfeffer as originally thought. Similar DNA testing revealed other California plantings of vines labelled as Trousseau/Bastardo to also be Gros Verdot.

In 2012, Chile reported having 17 acres (6.9 hectares) of "Verdot" plantings which were distinct from the 635 acres (257 hectares) of Petit Verdot. Argentina has documented 1,124 acres (455 hectares) of just "Verdot" but Master of Wine Jancis Robinson notes that these are likely all plantings of Petit Verdot.

=== Meritage ===
Gros Verdot is a permitted variety in the red Meritage "Bordeaux style" wine produced in California, Washington, Michigan, Virginia and other wine regions with wineries that are members of the Meritage Alliance. In these wines, the grape is usually blended with Cabernet Sauvignon, Merlot, Cabernet Franc, Carmenère, Malbec, St-Macaire and Petit Verdot.

== Styles ==
According to Master of Wine Jancis Robinson Gros Verdot tends to produce a less concentrated wine than Petit Verdot but one with cherry and pepper notes.

== Synonyms ==
Over the years Gros Verdot has been known under a variety synonyms including: Colon, Fer, Fer Servadon, Fer Servadou, Gros Verdot Colon, Gros Verdot Crni, Gros Verdot noir, Here, Hère (in the Dordogne), Herranet, Herre, Hert, Mancin Colon, Plant de Palus (in the Gironde), Pruera, Verdau Colon, Verdot Colon (in the Gironde) and Verdot Gros.
