= Ridgemark, California =

Ridgemark
- census-designated place
- Location in San Benito County and the state of California

- Location in the United States
- Coordinates: 36°48′37″N 121°21′46″W
- Country: United States
- State: California
- County: San Benito

Area
  - Total: 2.570 sq mi (6.656 km^{2})
  - Land: 2.570 sq mi (6.656 km^{2})
  - Water: 0 sq mi (0 km^{2}) 0%
- Elevation: 489 ft (149 m)

Population (2020)
  - Total: 3,212
  - Density: 1,250/sq mi (482.6/km^{2})
- Time zone: UTC-8 (Pacific (PST))
  - Summer (DST): UTC-7 (PDT)
- ZIP code: 95023
- Area code: 831
- FIPS code: 06-60706
- GNIS feature ID: 1853408

Ridgemark is a census-designated place (CDP) located adjacent to the southeastern edge of Hollister in San Benito County, California, United States. The community is a private, gated golf development with a golf course and just over 1,000 homes. Development of the community began in the early 1970s, and the population had reached 3,212 at the time of the 2020 United States census.

== Geography ==
Ridgemark is located at 36°48′37″N 121°21′46″W.

According to the United States Census Bureau, the CDP has a total area of 2.6 square miles (6.7 km^{2}), all land.

=== Climate ===
This region experiences warm (but not hot) and dry summers, with no average monthly temperatures above 71.6 °F. According to the Köppen Climate Classification system, Ridgemark has a warm-summer Mediterranean climate, abbreviated "Csb" on climate maps.

== Demographics ==
Historical population
Census	Pop.	Note	%±
2000	2,741		—
2010	3,016		10.0%
2020	3,212		6.5%
U.S. Decennial Census; 1860–1870 1880-1890; 1900 1910 1920; 1930 1940 1950; 1960 1970 1980; 1990 2000 2010

Ridgemark first appeared as a census designated place in the 2000 U.S. census.

=== 2020 census ===
As of the 2020 census, Ridgemark had a population of 3,212 and a population density of 1,249.8 inhabitants per square mile (482.6/km^{2}).

Racial composition as of the 2020 census
Race	Number	Percent
White	2,151	67.0%
Black or African American	27	0.8%
American Indian and Alaska Native	26	0.8%
Asian	129	4.0%
Native Hawaiian and Other Pacific Islander	10	0.3%
Some other race	365	11.4%
Two or more races	504	15.7%
Hispanic or Latino (of any race)	1,008	31.4%

The census reported that 99.9% of the population lived in households, 0.1% lived in non-institutionalized group quarters, and no one was institutionalized. 98.5% of residents lived in urban areas, while 1.5% lived in rural areas.

There were 1,265 households, out of which 27.4% included children under the age of 18, 62.1% were married-couple households, 5.1% were cohabiting couple households, 20.8% had a female householder with no partner present, and 12.1% had a male householder with no partner present. 21.3% of households were one person, and 13.8% were one person aged 65 or older. The average household size was 2.54. There were 951 families (75.2% of all households).

The age distribution was 18.2% under the age of 18, 6.2% aged 18 to 24, 20.0% aged 25 to 44, 28.6% aged 45 to 64, and 26.9% who were 65 years of age or older. The median age was 49.9 years. For every 100 females, there were 94.3 males, and for every 100 females age 18 and over, there were 93.8 males age 18 and over.

There were 1,336 housing units at an average density of 519.8 units per square mile (200.7 units/km^{2}), of which 1,265 (94.7%) were occupied. Of these, 82.6% were owner-occupied, and 17.4% were occupied by renters. Of all housing units, 5.3% were vacant. The homeowner vacancy rate was 1.2%, and the rental vacancy rate was 6.0%.

=== Income and poverty ===
In 2023, the US Census Bureau estimated that the median household income was $127,117, and the per capita income was $67,897. About 4.0% of families and 5.8% of the population were below the poverty line.

=== 2010 census ===
The 2010 United States census reported that Ridgemark had a population of 3,016. The population density was 1,173.5 inhabitants per square mile (453.1/km^{2}). The racial makeup of Ridgemark was 2,520 (83.6%) White, 23 (0.8%) African American, 14 (0.5%) Native American, 105 (3.5%) Asian, 3 (0.1%) Pacific Islander, 248 (8.2%) from other races, and 103 (3.4%) from two or more races. Hispanic or Latino of any race were 623 persons (20.7%).

The Census reported that 2,980 people (98.8% of the population) lived in households, 36 (1.2%) lived in non-institutionalized group quarters, and 0 (0%) were institutionalized.

There were 1,207 households, out of which 332 (27.5%) had children under the age of 18 living in them, 780 (64.6%) were opposite-sex married couples living together, 88 (7.3%) had a female householder with no husband present, 49 (4.1%) had a male householder with no wife present. There were 42 (3.5%) unmarried opposite-sex partnerships, and 9 (0.7%) same-sex married couples or partnerships. 244 households (20.2%) were made up of individuals, and 141 (11.7%) had someone living alone who was 65 years of age or older. The average household size was 2.47. There were 917 families (76.0% of all households); the average family size was 2.84.

The population was spread out, with 620 people (20.6%) under the age of 18, 139 people (4.6%) aged 18 to 24, 529 people (17.5%) aged 25 to 44, 984 people (32.6%) aged 45 to 64, and 744 people (24.7%) who were 65 years of age or older. The median age was 49.1 years. For every 100 females, there were 93.1 males. For every 100 females age 18 and over, there were 92.9 males.

There were 1,260 housing units at an average density of 490.3 per square mile (189.3/km^{2}), of which 1,008 (83.5%) were owner-occupied, and 199 (16.5%) were occupied by renters. The homeowner vacancy rate was 1.7%; the rental vacancy rate was 6.1%. 2,428 people (80.5% of the population) lived in owner-occupied housing units and 552 people (18.3%) lived in rental housing units.

== Government ==
In the California State Legislature, Ridgemark is in the 17th senatorial district, represented by Democrat John Laird, and in the 29th Assembly district, represented by Democrat Robert Rivas.

In the United States House of Representatives, Ridgemark is in California's 18th congressional district, represented by Democrat Zoe Lofgren.
