= Bitterwater, California =

Unincorporated community in California, United States

Bitterwater is an unincorporated community in the Bitterwater Valley of San Benito County, California, United States. Bitterwater is located at 36°22′49″N 121°00′10″W. The population of San Benito-Bitterwater was 805 at the 2020 United States census.

The first non-Native settler in the Bitterwater area was Edward Calhoun Tully, who discovered a spring in the valley in 1861. The descendants of Tully and his brother-in-law, Francisco Quintanar De Alvarez, lived in the valley for more than a century. The Bitterwater Valley was the site of some oil exploration in the 1950s.
