= Chalone AVA =

Wine appellation in Monterey County, California

Coordinates: 36°28′15″N 121°13′47″W

Chalone
- Wine region
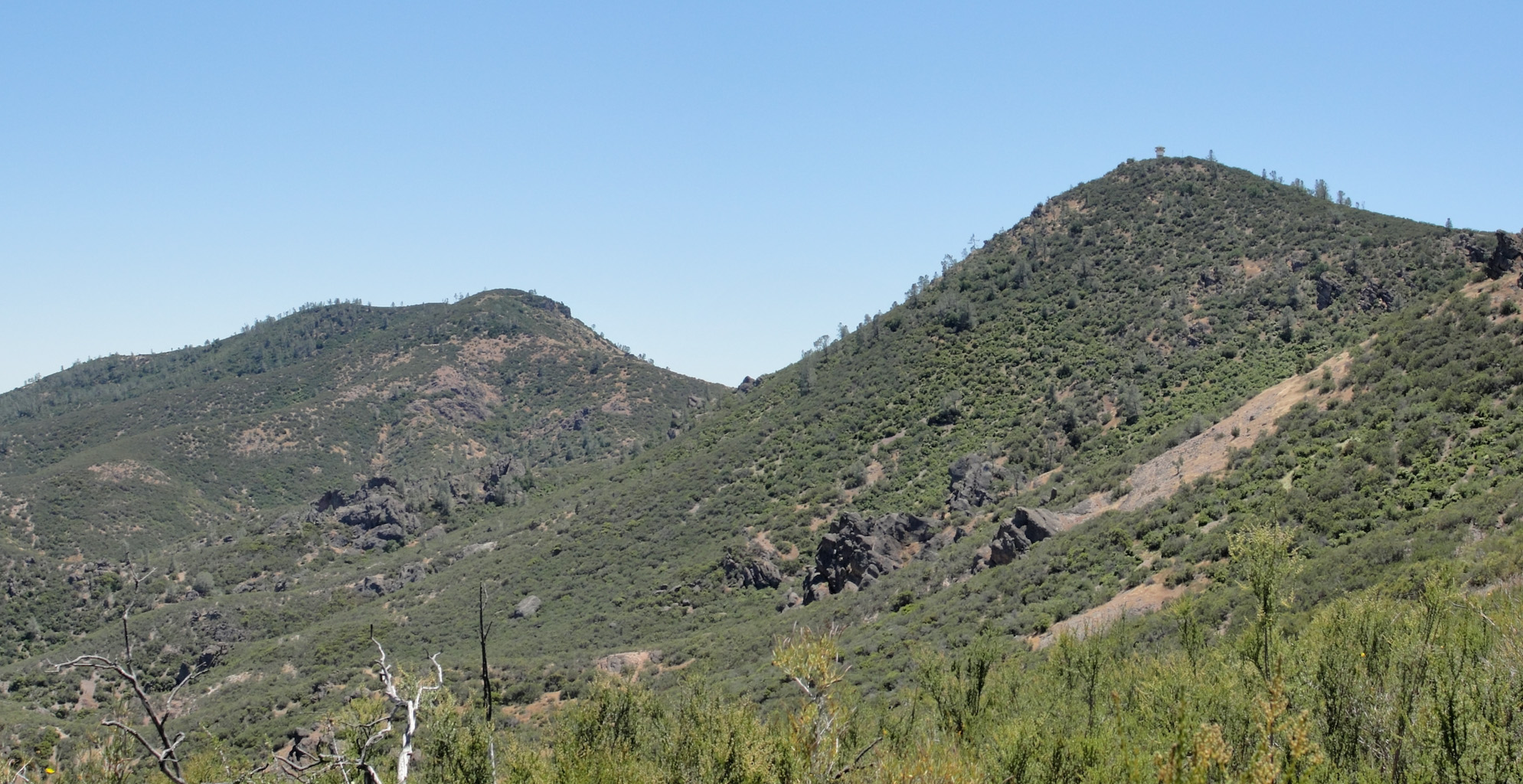
- South and North Chalone Peaks from Chalone Peak Trail
- Type: American Viticultural Area
- Year established: 1982
- Years of wine industry: 107
- Country: United States
- Part of: California, Central Coast AVA, Monterey County, San Benito County, Gabilan Mountains AVA
- Soil conditions: Miocene volcanic and Mesozoic granitic rocks, heavy in limestone deposits
- Total area: 8,640 acres (14 sq mi)
- Size of planted vineyards: 300 acres (121 ha)
- No. of vineyards: 4
- Grapes produced: Chardonnay, Chenin blanc, Grenache, Pinot blanc, Pinot noir, Marsanne, Sangiovese, Syrah
- No. of wineries: 4

Chalone /ʃəˈloʊn/ shuh-LOHN) is an American Viticultural Area (AVA) located in Monterey County, California straddling the border with San Benito County in the Gabilan Mountains east of Soledad. It was established as the nation's fifteenth, the state's tenth, Monterey County's initial and San Benito County's second appellation on June 14, 1982 by the Bureau of Alcohol, Tobacco and Firearms (ATF), Treasury after reviewing the petition submitted by Richard Graff of Gavilan Vineyards, Inc., proposing a viticultural area to be named "The Pinnacles." At the outset, the area encompassed 8,640 acres (14 sq mi) and the proposed name was recognition of the nearby Chalone peaks.

== Naming ==
Based upon testimony presented at a public hearing and submitted written comments, ATF concluded the proposed name, "The Pinnacles", was inappropriate to designate the viticultural area. This determination occurred because of trademark claims by another winery and the possibility of consumer confusion that would result if the name was approved. Paragon Vineyard submitted historical evidence which establishes the history of the name "Chalone" dating back to 1816 at which time the name referred to a division of the Costanoan family which lived in the area. Further evidence was submitted which claimed that the Pinnacles Monument was initially called Chalone Peaks prior to being designated as a national monument. Within the area covered by the Pinnacles National Monument, the two most distinctive geographical features are the North and South Chalone Peaks. The western boundary of the national monument is the eastern boundary of the viticultural area. One of the U.S.G.S. maps submitted with the petition is entitled "North Chalone Peak". Chalone Creek encircles the viticultural area on the north and east.

At the outset, the viticultural area contained one winery, Chalone Vineyard, with 120 acres (49 ha) under vine. The petitioner stated that approximately 50 percent of the area is plantable; however, due to the shortage of water for irrigation, the majority of the area was not being cultivated. In the final ruling, ATF ruled that sufficient evidence was submitted which established historical and current use of the name "Chalone" for the viticultural area.

== History ==
Chalone boasts the oldest producing vines in Monterey County. In 1919, French immigrant and entrepreneur, Charles L. Tamm, traveled through California searching for the terroir with limestone soil similar to his native Burgundy. He found a property in Monterey County which is currently Chalone Vineyard. On the north slope of Chalone Peak at 1,800 feet (550 m), Tamm planted Chenin Blanc sourcing for wineries during Prohibition, when the grapes were used to make sacramental wines. Winegrowing, however, never became important in Monterey County because it was considered a "poor area" for viticulture. Strong winds off Monterey Bay and the arid climate of the Salinas River Valley deterred the planting of wine grapes. During Prohibition, only 400 acres (162 ha) of vineyards survived in Monterey County and this acreage was halved in the years following Repeal. Later, Chalone Vineyard grew and its grapes were sold in the 1940s and 1950s to Almaden Vineyards and Wente Brothers. In 1946, Chalone vineyards were expanded by its subsequent owner, William Silvear, with more Chardonnay and Chenin Blanc plus newly planted Pinot Blanc and Pinot Noir.

In the early 1960s, the modern era of viticulture took root and Monterey County gained prominence as a wine-producing region. By the late 1960s and early 1970s, the quality of some California wines was outstanding but few took notice as the market favored French brands. At the Paris Wine Tasting of 1976 on May 24, Chalone Vineyard's 1974 Chardonnay ranked 3rd in the white wine category scored predominantly by renown French oenophiles. The identical vintage ranked 1st in a repeat event at the San Francisco Wine Tasting of 1978.

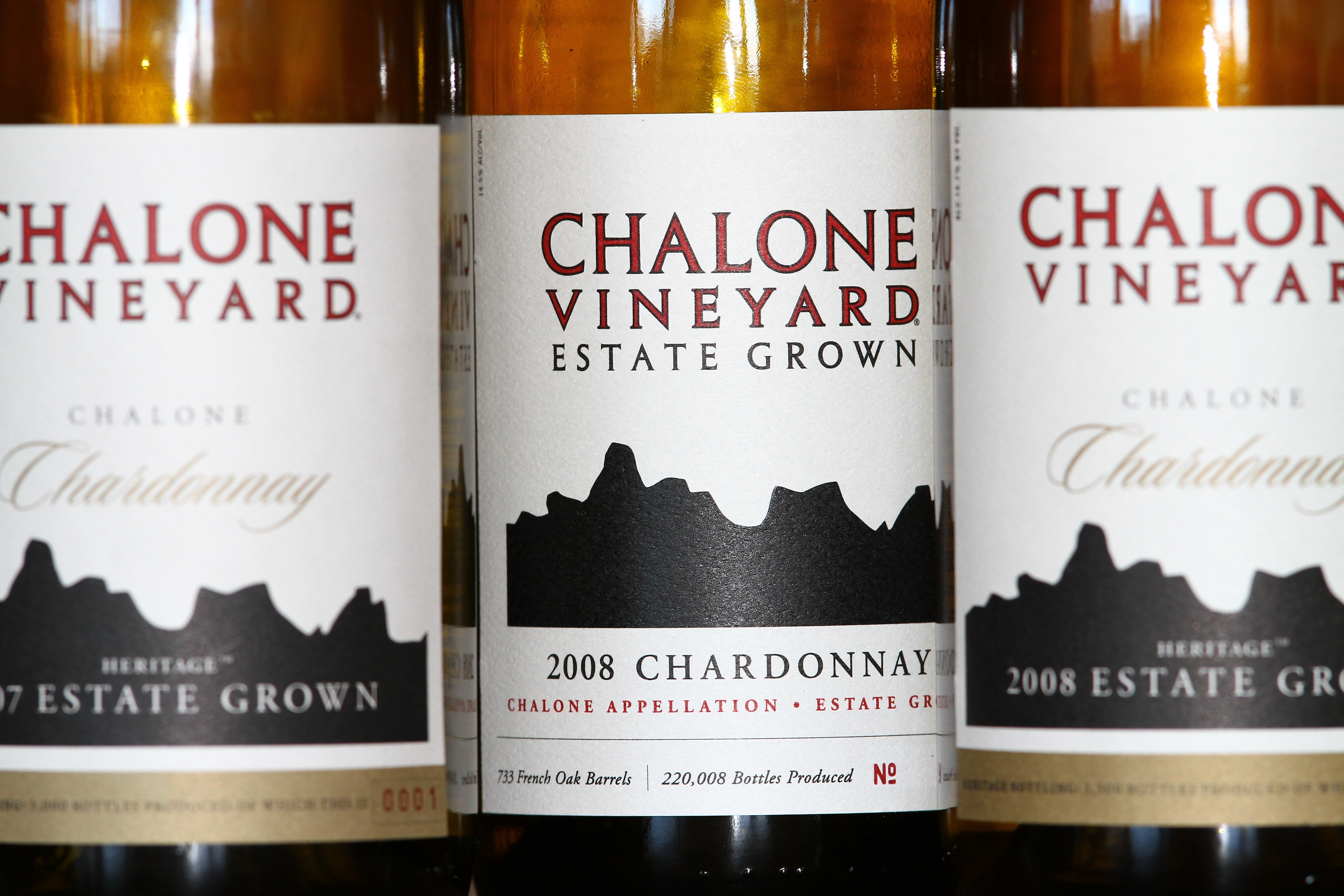

== Terroir ==
The viticultural area, as amended, consists of 8,640 acres (14 sq mi) of rolling land located on a geological bench in the Gabilan (or Gavilan) Mountain Range of Central California. The area has a mean elevation of 1,650 feet (503 m) above sea level and drains into Bryant Canyon, Stonewell Canyon and Shirttail Gulch. The boundaries are as follows: to the south and west, the points at which the land drops off sharply to the Salinas Valley: to the north, the ridge line (watershed divide) effectively dividing Monterey and San Benito Counties, and the Gloria Valley on the other side, and, to the east, the western boundary of the Pinnacles National Monument. The area ranges in elevation from 1,400 to 2,000 feet (427–610 m) above sea level, with a mean elevation of 1,650 feet (503 m) above sea level. The surrounding area to the south and west is characterized by a steep drop to the Salinas Valley, which has a mean elevation of 300 feet (91 m) above sea leveL The area to the east, the Pinnacles National Monument, is unavailable for private agriculture. Except for the Gloria Valley (which is distinguishable from the viticultural area for other reasons), the area to the north rises to higher elevations than those found in the viticultural area. The petitioner claims that the differences in elevation between the Salinas Valley and the proposed area produce dramatic differences in climatic conditions.

The climate of the Salinas Valley is tempered by the cooling winds from Monterey Bay which form a thick fog layer that extends to an elevation of 1,000 feet (305 m). In summer the viticultural area is approximately 10 °F (−12 °C) warmer than the Salinas Valley because the former does not receive the cooling winds and fog cover from Monterey Bay. The USDA plant hardiness zones are 9a and 9b.

The soils of the Chalone area has limestone and decomposed granite soil and significantly differ from soils of surrounding areas. Within the area, the soils primarily consist of Miocene volcanic and Mesozoic granitic rocks, heavy in limestone deposits. The Salinas Valley to the south and west consists of alluvium and river terrace rocks, while the Gloria Valley to the north is alluvial. The Pinnacles National Monument, to the east, though similar in mineral deposits, is unavailable for private agriculture.

The limited rainfall and soil content of limestone and granite contribute to the rich bouquet found in Chalone wines by limiting grape yields and optimizing drainage for the root system to maintain healthy vines and produce flavorful fruit.

== See also ==
- California wine
