= San Benito, California =

Unincorporated community in California, United States

- Unincorporated community
- Location within California Location within the United States
- Coordinates: 36°30′35″N 121°04′55″W
- Country: United States
- State: California
- County: San Benito
- Elevation: 1,345 ft (410 m)
- Time zone: UTC-8 (Pacific (PST))
  - Summer (DST): UTC-7 (PDT)
- Area code: 831
- GNIS feature ID: 1659575

San Benito (Spanish for "St. Benedict") is an unincorporated community in San Benito County, California, United States. San Benito is 18 miles (29 km) southeast of Paicines, both communities on the San Benito River. The community had a post office from 1869 to 1968. The population of San Benito-Bitterwater was 805 at the 2020 United States census.

== Climate ==
This region experiences warm (but not hot) and dry summers, with no average monthly temperatures above 71.6 °F. According to the Köppen Climate Classification system, San Benito has a warm-summer Mediterranean climate, abbreviated "Csb" on climate maps.
