= Lime Kiln Valley AVA =

Viticultural area in San Benito County, California

Coordinates: 36°41′13″N 121°21′42″W

Lime Kiln Valley
- Wine region
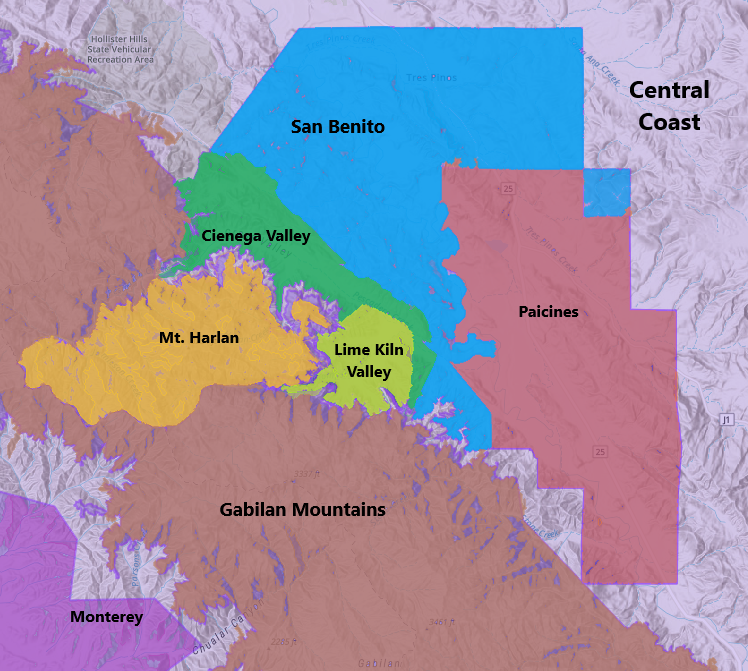
- Type: American Viticultural Area
- Year established: 1982; 1987 Amended
- Years of wine industry: 139
- Country: United States
- Part of: California, Central Coast AVA, San Benito County, San Benito AVA, Cienega Valley AVA
- Growing season: 265 days
- Climate region: Region II
- Precipitation (annual average): 16 to 40 in (410–1,020 mm)
- Soil conditions: Sandy and gravelly loam over limestone and dolomite bedrock
- Total area: 2,300 acres (4 sq mi)
- Size of planted vineyards: 180 acres (73 ha)
- No. of vineyards: 2
- Grapes produced: Mourvedre/Mataro, Zinfandel
- No. of wineries: 1

Lime Kiln Valley is an American Viticultural Area (AVA) located within the southern end of the larger Cienega Valley viticultural area in San Benito County, California. It was established as the nation's fourteenth, the state's ninth and the county’s initial appellation on June 4, 1982 by the Bureau of Alcohol, Tobacco and Firearms (ATF) after reviewing the petition submitted by Susan Enz of Enz Vineyards proposing a viticultural area known as "Lime Kiln Valley."

The valley is located about 19 miles (31 km) from the San Joaquin Valley landform and approximately 18 miles (29 km) from the Pacific Ocean. The original proposed area covered approximately 9,500 acres (14.8 sq mi) while the ATF approved area covers approximately 2,300 acres (3.6 sq mi). The area has a wide diurnal temperature variation of up to 50 °F (28 °C), with daytime temperatures in the 85 to 95 °F (29–35 °C) range during the summer growing seasons. The soil in the region is composed of a sandy, gravelly loam over a limestone and dolomite bedrock. The AVA is home to old vines' Mourvedre plantings and Zinfindel.

== History ==
History in San Benito County dates back to the mid-18th century with the advent of the Spanish Catholic priests of the Franciscan order establishing the Alta California Mission system between 1769 and 1833, specifically the Mission San Juan Bautista in 1797. Cienega Valley grape vines were planted in the 1852 by Theophile Vache, a French wine merchant who immigrated from the Bordeaux region. Vineyards were planted in Lime Kiln in 1887. The historic Enz Vineyards were planted in 1923 and has been producing and marketing wine referring to a Lime Kiln label since the early 1970s. The general area historically has long been known as Limekiln. On September 6, 1977, the County Board of Supervisors unanimously adopted a resolution naming the valley surrounding Limekiln as Lime Kiln Valley. The area derived its name from a number of lime kilns built in the area among the local quarries. Many of the kilns were in operation prior to 1910.

== Terroir ==
=== Topography ===
Most of the Lime Kiln Valley vineyards are located at 1,000 feet (300 m) above sea level. The petition stated that the variation in the rainfall would affect any grapes grown in the mountainous area differently than the grapes grown on the valley floor. Therefore, no grapes are grown in the mountainous area and plantings are not anticipated. Vineyard expansions are planned within the amended boundaries of the viticultural area. After evaluating the entire record concerning the climate of the area, ATF believed the boundaries of the proposed Lime Kiln Valley should be amended to exclude the mountainous areas. ATF believed the boundaries now used delineate an area which exhibits similar characteristics, but differ from surrounding areas. The boundaries are described primarily by Cienega Road and the 1,400-foot (430 m) contour line. While ATF believes that viticultural area boundaries based solely on man-made features are inappropriate, where such features closely approximate natural features, or where they provide a demarcation line from grape-growing areas as opposed to areas not suitable for grape-growing, or where they provide a line to delineate a climatic feature, it is acceptable to use these man-made features in describing boundaries.

=== Climate ===
Rainfall averages 40 in (1,000 mm) per year in the upper western reaches of Lime Kiln Valley, and 16 inches (410 mm) per year in the lower eastern reaches. The valley receives over two inches (51 mm) more rainfall per year than Hollister, located approximately 11 miles (18 km) northwest from Lime Kiln Valley. Winter temperatures are well below freezing. Summer temperatures average between 85–95 °F (29–35 °C), while dropping at night to between 45–50 °F (7–10 °C). Usual morning fog during early summer is burned off by mid-morning. The prevailing winds are predominantly northwesterly from the ocean. The USDA plant hardiness zones are 9a and 9b.

=== Soil ===
The soil structure of the valley is basically a sandy and gravelly loam over bedrock of limestone and dolomite. The Coulter pine is the dominant vegetation distinctive from the surrounding area. It grows in limited areas due to climatic conditions. In the area here, the pine grows only within the watershed boundary which very closely approximates the boundary of the viticultural area. Ground water is available in the form of natural springs and artesian wells.

== Viticulture ==
The only vineyards in the Lime Kiln Valley are owned by the Enz Family. Currently there are 40 acres (16 ha) of vineyards, including a 15 acres (6.1 ha) parcel of head-trained Mourvedre that was originally planted in 1922. The historic vineyard was first planted in 1895 growing with Zinfandel and Cabernet Pfeffer (Gros Verdot), then the 1922 plantings, and in 1972, Sauvignon Blanc and Zinfandel. Since the early 1990s, Kenneth Volk worked with the vineyard and grafted over the Sauvignon Blanc to Pinot Noir in 1994.
