= San Benito County, California =

County in California, United States

Coordinates: 36.61°N 121.08°W

San Benito County
- County
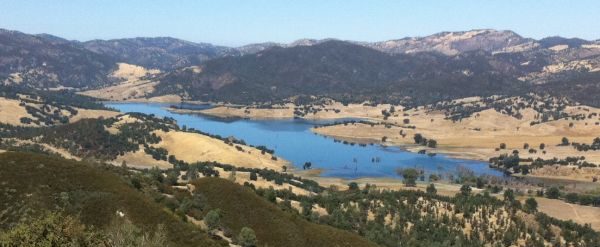
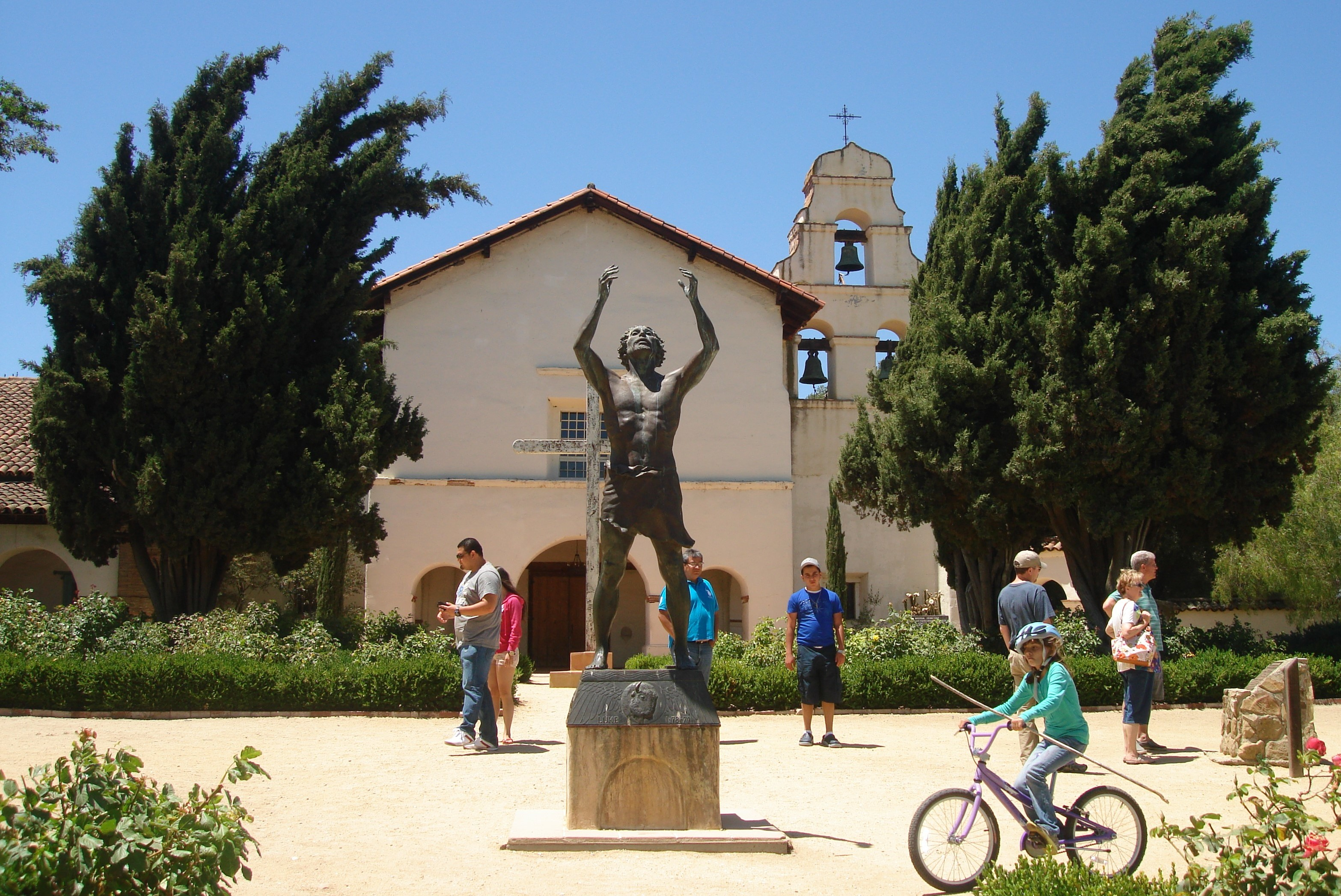
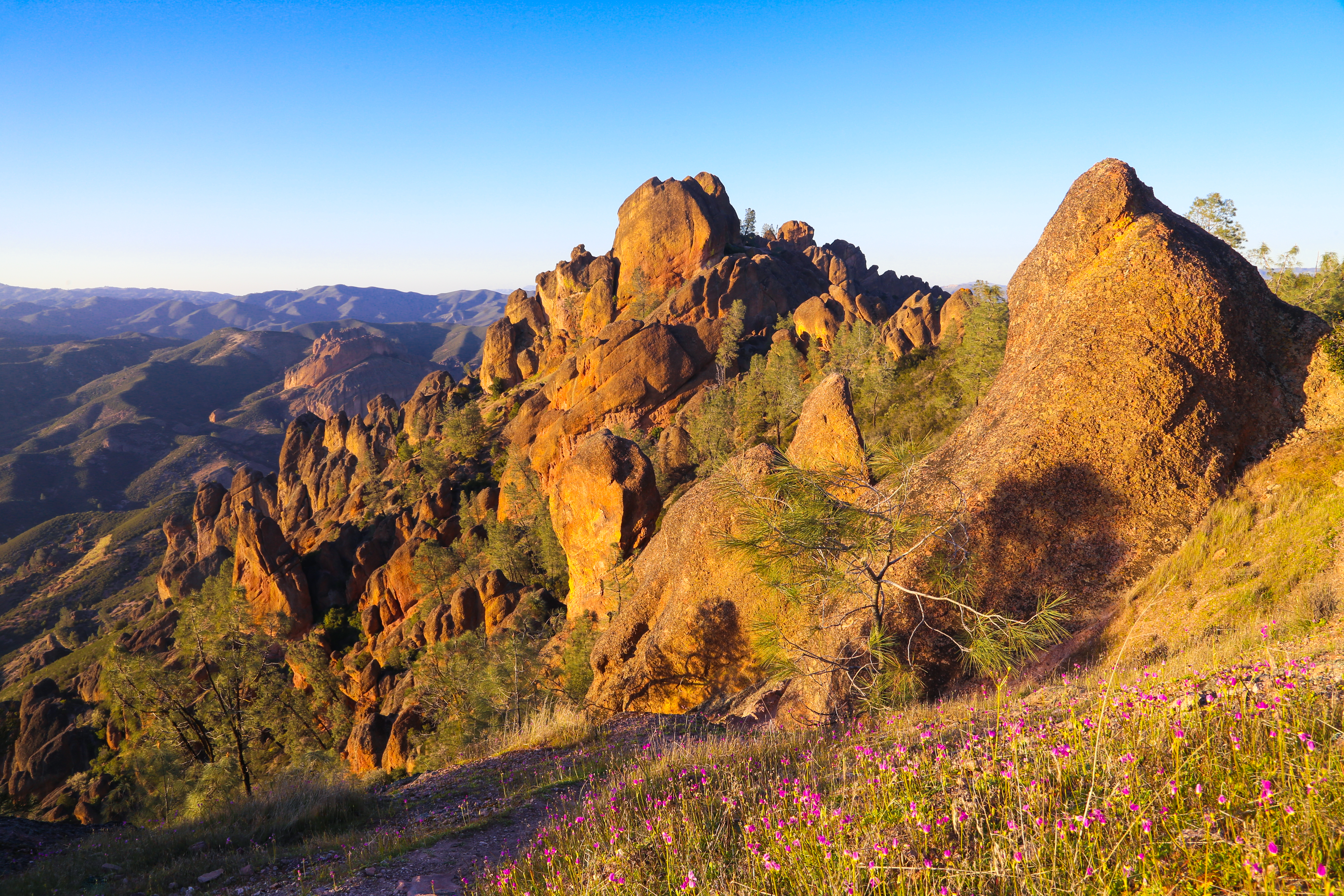
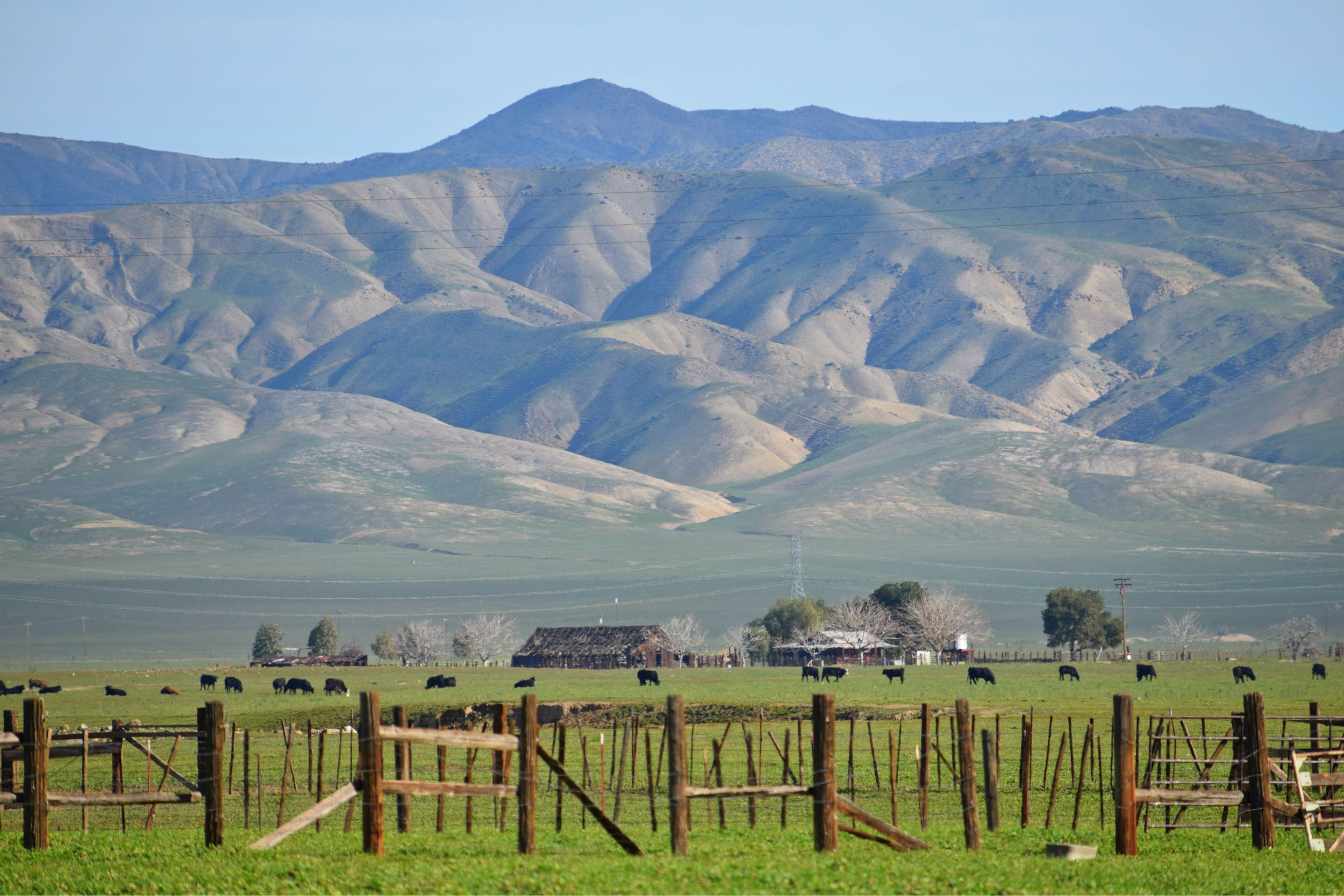
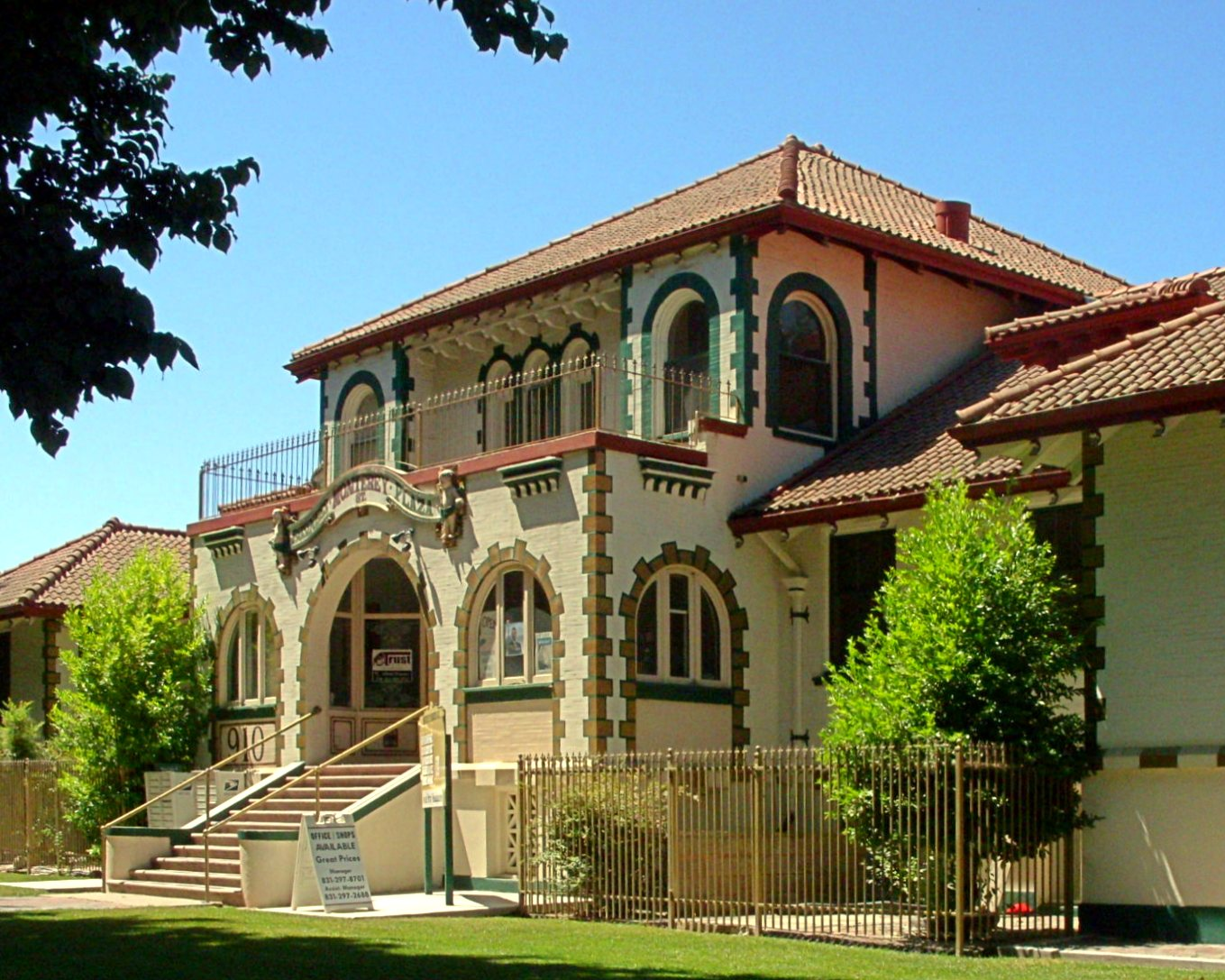
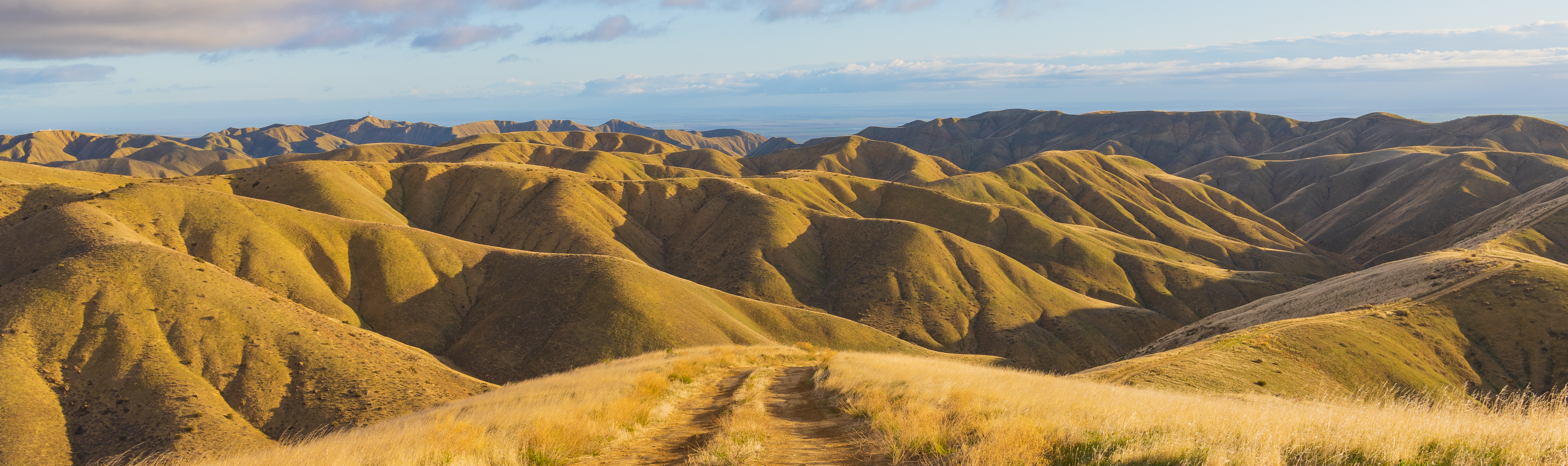
- Hernandez Reservoir in the Diablo Range San Juan Bautista Pinnacles National Park Panoche Valley Hollister Panoche Hills in the Coast Ranges

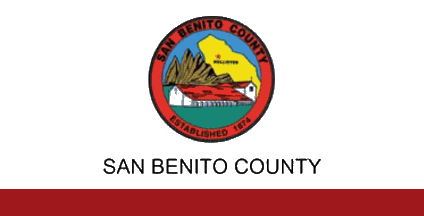
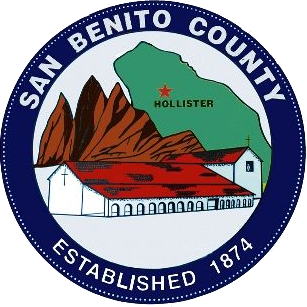
- Flag Seal
- Interactive map of San Benito County
- Location in the state of California
- Country: United States
- State: California
- Region: Central Coast
- CSA: San Jose-San Francisco-Oakland
- Metro: San Jose-Sunnyvale-Santa Clara
- Incorporated: February 12, 1874
- Named for: San Benito River
- County seat: Hollister
- Largest city: Hollister

Government
  - Type: Council–CEO
  - Body: Board of Supervisors
  - Chair: Dom Zanger
  - Vice Chair: Ignacio Velazquez
  - Board of Supervisors: Supervisors: Dom Zanger; Kollin Kosmicki; Mindy Sotelo; Angela Curro; Ignacio Velazquez
  - County Administrative Officer: Ray Espinosa

Area
  - Total: 1,390 sq mi (3,600 km^{2})
  - Land: 1,389 sq mi (3,600 km^{2})
  - Water: 1.8 sq mi (4.7 km^{2})
- Highest elevation: 5,245 ft (1,599 m)

Population (2020)
  - Total: 64,209
  - Estimate (2025): 70,082 ▲
  - Density: 46.23/sq mi (17.85/km^{2})

GDP
  - Total: $2.736 billion (2022)
- Time zone: UTC−8 (Pacific Time Zone)
  - Summer (DST): UTC−7 (Pacific Daylight Time)
- Area code: 831
- FIPS code: 06-069
- GNIS feature ID: 277299
- Congressional district: 18th
- Website: www.sanbenitocountyca.gov

San Benito County (/ˌsæn bəˈniːtoʊ/; San Benito, Spanish for "St. Benedict"), officially the County of San Benito, is a county located in the Central Coast region of California. Situated in the California Coast Ranges, the county had a population of 64,209, as of the 2020 United States census. The county seat is the city of Hollister.

While not part of the traditional nine-county definition of the San Francisco Bay Area, the U.S. Census Bureau includes San Benito County in the San Jose–Sunnyvale–Santa Clara metropolitan statistical area and the San Jose–San Francisco–Oakland combined statistical area. El Camino Real passes through the county and includes one mission in San Juan Bautista.

== History ==
Before the arrival of the first European settlers, the San Benito County area was inhabited by the Mutsun sub-group of the Ohlone Native Americans. In 1772 Father Juan Crespí conducted a brief expedition into the area and named a small river which he found in honor of San Benito de Nursia (Saint Benedict), the patron saint of monasticism. The county was later named after the San Benito Valley, the valley surrounding this river. Thus it was from the Spanish version of the saint's name that the county eventually took its name.

In 1797 Spanish missionaries founded the first European settlement in the county as the San Juan Bautista mission. In 1848 the United States government gained control over what would soon become the state of California, which included the area now known as San Benito county. The town of New Idria was the next town to develop in the area and was founded ca. 1857. New Idria was centered around the New Idria Mercury Mine. When the mine played out fairly recently in 1972, New Idria was abandoned, and the town is now one of California's many ghost-towns.

The town of Hollister was next founded on November 19, 1868, by William Welles Hollister on the grounds of the former Mexican land-grant Rancho San Justo. In 1874 the California legislature formed San Benito County from a section of Monterey County while naming Hollister as the new county seat. Sections of Merced and Fresno Counties were also later reassigned to San Benito County in 1887 as a result of the growth of the New Idria community. Other towns in the county which were founded early in the county's history include Tres Pinos and Paicines.

== Geography ==
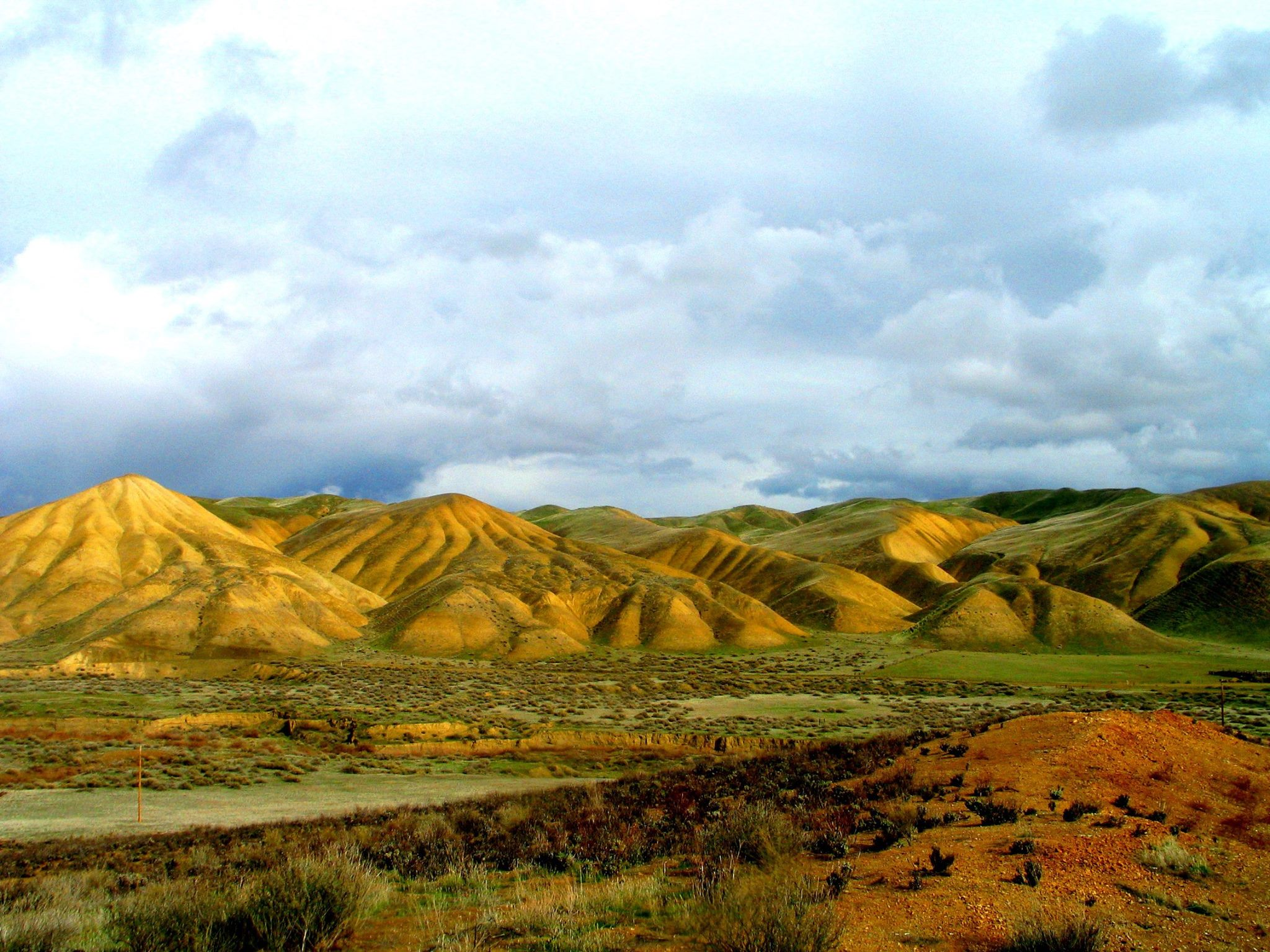
Tumey Hills BLM recreation area, near Interstate 5

According to the U.S. Census Bureau, the county has a total area of 1,390 square miles (3,600 km^{2}), of which 1,388 square miles (3,595 km^{2}) is land and 1.8 square miles (4.7 km^{2}) is water (0.1%). San Benito County contains nearly the entire length of the 109 miles (175 km)-long San Benito River from the county's southwestern edge to its northwestern edge where it joins the Pajaro River.

Sharing a border with Santa Clara County, San Benito County lies adjacent to the San Francisco Bay Area and is sometimes considered a part of that region. Frequently, the county is associated with the Monterey Bay Area through governmental organizations such as the Association of Monterey Bay Area Governments as well as the Pajaro River, which flows from northern San Benito County into the Monterey Bay. The United States Census Bureau includes the county in the San Jose-Sunnyvale-Santa Clara MSA and the San Jose-San Francisco-Oakland CSA, which the Census uses as a statistical definition of the San Francisco Bay Area.

The county also borders Merced County and Fresno County on the east, which extend into California's San Joaquin Valley. It borders Santa Cruz County on the west and Monterey County on the southwest border.

The county is also the location of the Mount Harlan and San Benito American Viticultural Areas. The latter contains the Cienega Valley, Lime Kiln Valley, and Paicines AVAs.

=== Flora ===
Due to the varied topography, diverse geology, and varied climate from near-coastal to inland, San Benito County contains a high diversity of vegetation types. Common vegetation types include annual grasslands, coastal scrub, chaparral, and oak woodland.

In the county's extreme northwestern portion maritime fogs and cooler temperatures harbored coast redwoods (Sequoia sempervirens) historically, as evidenced by a description of the 1797 construction of Mission San Juan Bautista: "Redwood saplings, of convenient length and about six inches at the butt, were used for rafters;". In addition, two historical range maps show coast redwoods ranging into northwestern San Benito County, making the county one of five inland California counties, and one of 13 total California counties, which harbored redwoods historically.

In the extreme southeastern portion of San Benito County at Panoche Valley, Panoche Hills, Tumey Hills, and Vallecitos, the climate is arid and part of the recently recognized San Joaquin Desert biome. The flora there includes saltbush scrub, San Joaquin Desert scrub, and California juniper woodland. Panoche Hills navarretia (Navarretia panochensis) is nearly endemic to this small portion of the San Joaquin Desert in San Benito County.

At the highest elevations of San Benito County at Fremont Peak and San Benito Mountain, the average annual precipitation is high enough and the average annual temperature is cool enough to support mixed conifer forest. At San Benito Mountain, the high elevation climate and extreme geology of the New Idria serpentine, supports a unique mixed-conifer forest that includes foothill pine, Coulter pine, Jeffrey pine, and incense cedar. The extreme conditions of the serpentine soils of the New Idria serpentine mass support many rare local endemic plant species including San Benito evening primrose (Camissonia benitensis), rayless layia (Layia discoidea), Guirado's goldenrod (Solidago guiradonis), and San Benito fritillary (Fritillaria viridea).

The plant species Benitoa occidentalis was named for San Benito County. Camissonia benitensis, Monardella antonina subsp. benitensis, and Arctostaphylos benitoensis were named in recognition of their being endemic or near-endemic to San Benito County. The species Hollisteria lanata was named after William Welles Hollister, namesake of the city of Hollister.

=== Fauna ===
Illacme plenipes, a millipede having more legs than any other millipede species, was discovered in the county in 1926.

A California condor was found shot to death in the county on July 22, 2022, leading to the U.S. Fish and Wildlife Service posting a $5,000 reward for information on the killer.

=== Geology ===
The State Gem of California, benitoite, was discovered in the county.

The New Idria Mercury Mine, closed in 1972, was once the second largest mercury mine in the country.

=== National protected area ===
- Pinnacles National Park

== Demographics ==
Historical population
Census	Pop.	Note	%±
1880	5,584		—
1890	6,412		14.8%
1900	6,633		3.4%
1910	8,041		21.2%
1920	8,995		11.9%
1930	11,311		25.7%
1940	11,392		0.7%
1950	14,370		26.1%
1960	15,396		7.1%
1970	18,226		18.4%
1980	25,005		37.2%
1990	36,697		46.8%
2000	53,234		45.1%
2010	55,269		3.8%
2020	64,209		16.2%
2025 (est.)	70,082	▲	9.1%
U.S. Decennial Census; 1790–1960 1900–1990; 1990–2000 2010 2020

=== 2020 census ===
As of the 2020 census, the county had a population of 64,209 and a median age of 36.6 years. 25.4% of residents were under the age of 18 and 13.6% of residents were 65 years of age or older, while for every 100 females there were 99.0 males and, for every 100 females age 18 and over, 97.8 males.

The racial makeup of the county was 42.4% White, 1.0% Black or African American, 2.6% American Indian and Alaska Native, 3.8% Asian, 0.3% Native Hawaiian and Pacific Islander, 32.1% from some other race, and 17.9% from two or more races. Hispanic or Latino residents of any race comprised 61.1% of the population.

77.3% of residents lived in urban areas, while 22.7% lived in rural areas.

There were 19,484 households in the county, of which 43.4% had children under the age of 18 living with them and 20.4% had a female householder with no spouse or partner present. About 14.9% of all households were made up of individuals and 7.2% had someone living alone who was 65 years of age or older.

There were 20,365 housing units, of which 4.3% were vacant. Among occupied housing units, 67.2% were owner-occupied and 32.8% were renter-occupied. The homeowner vacancy rate was 1.1% and the rental vacancy rate was 2.5%.

=== Racial and ethnic composition ===
San Benito County, California – Racial and ethnic composition Note: the US Census treats Hispanic/Latino as an ethnic category. This table excludes Latinos from the racial categories and assigns them to a separate category. Hispanics/Latinos may be of any race.
Race / Ethnicity (NH = Non-Hispanic)	Pop 1980	Pop 1990	Pop 2000	Pop 2010	Pop 2020	% 1980	% 1990	% 2000	% 2010	% 2020
White alone (NH)	12,794	18,793	24,513	21,154	19,785	51.17%	51.21%	46.05%	38.27%	30.81%
Black or African American alone (NH)	59	167	475	355	479	0.24%	0.46%	0.89%	0.64%	0.75%
Native American or Alaska Native alone (NH)	179	210	279	231	221	0.72%	0.57%	0.52%	0.42%	0.34%
Asian alone (NH)	470	653	1,173	1,298	2,189	1.88%	1.78%	2.20%	2.35%	3.41%
Native Hawaiian or Pacific Islander alone (NH)	x	x	68	65	127	0.13%	0.12%	0.13%	0.12%	0.20%
Other race alone (NH)	73	74	53	67	332	0.29%	0.20%	0.10%	0.12%	0.52%
Mixed race or Multiracial (NH)	x	x	1,157	913	1,835	x	x	2.17%	1.65%	2.86%
Hispanic or Latino (any race)	11,430	16,800	25,516	31,186	39,241	45.71%	45.78%	47.93%	56.43%	61.11%
Total	25,005	36,697	53,234	55,269	64,209	100.00%	100.00%	100.00%	100.00%	100.00%

=== American Community Survey 2025 data ===
The United States Census Bureau estimated that in 2025, San Benito County’s population was 70.082. It was also estimated that the county's population was 26,78% Non-Hispanic White, 63,69% Hispanic or Latino, 1,17% Non-Hispanic Black, 5,17% Asian, 0,37% Native American, 0,26% Pacific Islander, and 2,56% Multiracial.

Total	Population	Percentage
Non-Hispanic White	18.769	26,78%
Hispanic or Latino	44.632	63,69%
Non-Hispanic Black	817	1,17%
Asian	3.626	5,17%
Native American	257	0,37%
Pacific Islander	185	0,26%
Non-Hispanic Multiracial	1.796	2,56%

=== 2010 census ===
The 2010 United States census reported that San Benito County had a population of 55,269. The racial makeup of San Benito County was 35,181 (63.7%) White, 483 (0.9%) African American, 895 (1.6%) Native American, 1,443 (2.6%) Asian, 94 (0.2%) Pacific Islander, 14,471 (26.2%) from other races, and 2,702 (4.9%) from two or more races. There were 31,186 people of Hispanic or Latino origin, of any race (56.4%).

Population reported at 2010 United States census

Area	Total; Population	White	African; American	Native; American	Asian	Pacific; Islander	other races	two or more races	Hispanic or Latino (of any race)
San Benito County	55,269	35,181	483	895	1443	94	14,471	2,702	31,186
Incorporated cities
Hollister	34,928	20,761	341	617	929	63	10,437	1,780	22,965
San Juan Bautista	1,862	1,125	12	58	52	2	494	119	907
Census-designated places
Aromas ‡	1,292	961	9	13	14	3	207	85	413
Ridgemark	3,016	2,520	23	14	105	3	248	103	623
Tres Pinos	476	390	3	8	6	0	57	12	112
Other unincorporated areas
All others not CDPs (combined)	13,695	9,424	95	185	337	23	3,028	603	6,166
‡ Note: these numbers reflect only the portion of this CDP in San Benito County

=== 2000 census ===
As of the census of 2000, there were 53,234 people, 15,885 households, and 12,898 families residing in the county. The population density was 38 people per square mile (15 people/km^{2}). There were 16,499 housing units at an average density of 12 units per square mile (4.6 units/km^{2}). The racial makeup of the county in 2010 was 38.3% non-Hispanic White, 0.6% non-Hispanic Black or African American, 0.4% Native American, 2.3% Asian, 0.1% Pacific Islander, 0.1% from other races, and 1.7% from two or more races. 56.4% of the population were Hispanic or Latino of any race. 7.6% were of German, 6.3% Irish and 5.4% Italian ancestry according to Census 2000. 62.8% spoke only English at home, while 35.3% spoke Spanish. As of the 2010 census, San Benito County was the only county in the greater San Francisco Bay Area with a Hispanic majority.

There were 15,885 households, out of which 46.3% had children under the age of 18 living with them, 65.7% were married couples living together, 10.5% had a female householder with no husband present, and 18.8% were non-families. 14.1% of all households were made up of individuals, and 5.4% had someone living alone who was 65 years of age or older. The average household size was 3.32 and the average family size was 3.64.

In the county 32.2% of the population was under the age of 18, 8.8% from 18 to 24, 31.5% from 25 to 44, 19.3% from 45 to 64, and 8.1% was 65 years of age or older. The median age was 31 years. For every 100 females there were 102.5 males. For every 100 females age 18 and over, there were 99.6 males.

The median income for a household in the county was $57,469, and the median income for a family was $60,665. Males had a median income of $44,158 versus $29,524 for females. The per capita income for the county was $20,932. About 6.7% of families and 10.0% of the population were below the poverty line, including 11.4% of those under age 18 and 8.5% of those age 65 or over.

== Government and policing ==
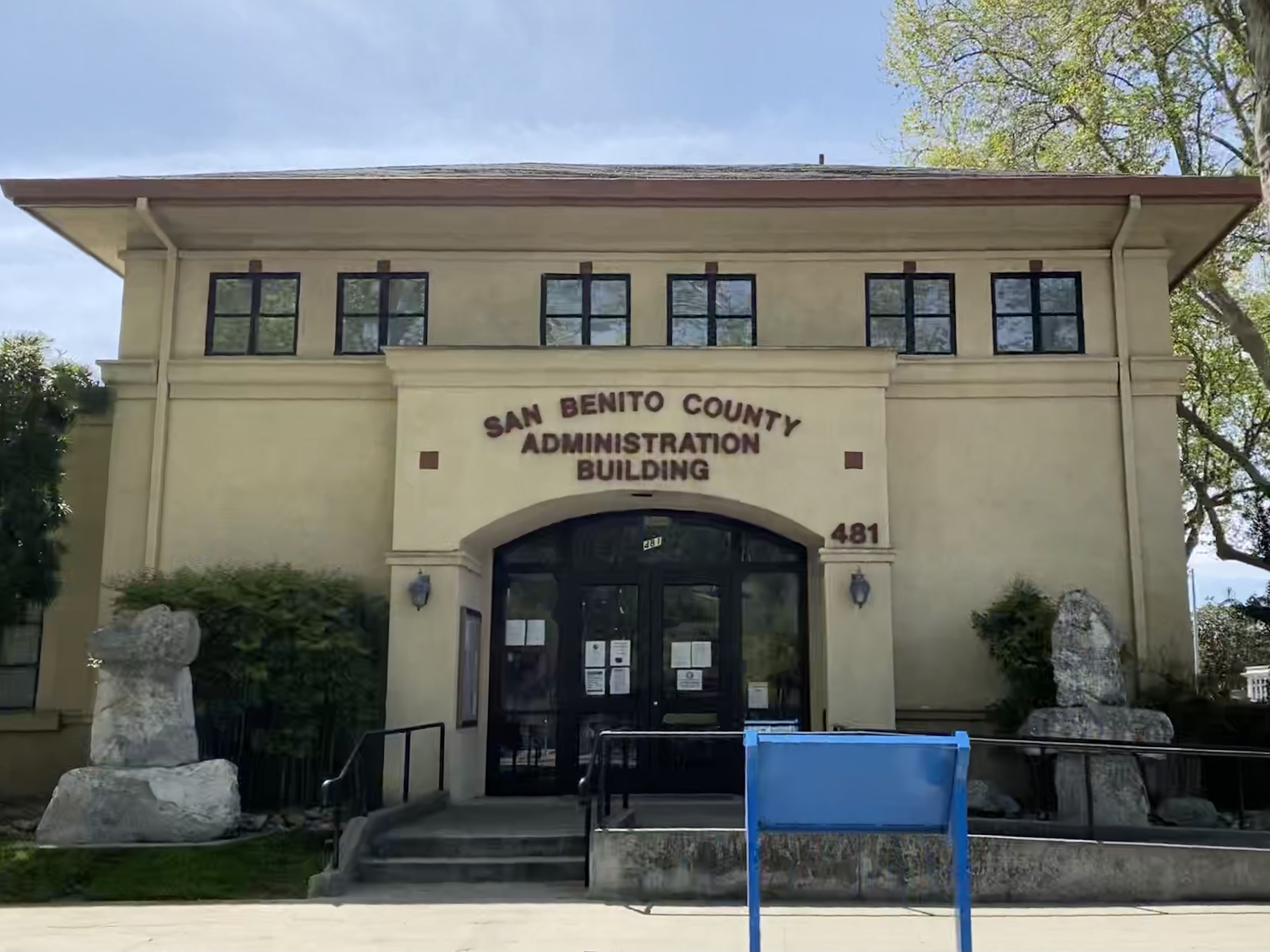
San Benito County Administration Building in Hollister, California.

County government is overseen by a five-member elected Board of Supervisors, who serve four-year terms of office. Other elected county leaders include:

- Assessor
- Clerk-Auditor-Recorder
- District Attorney
- Sheriff-Coroner
- Treasurer-Tax Collector-Public Administrator

San Benito County had the last elected Marshal in California until 2010 when the office closed. Shasta and Trinity Counties still have appointed Marshals.

=== State and federal representation ===
In the United States House of Representatives, San Benito County is part of California's 18th congressional district, represented by Democrat Zoe Lofgren.

In the California State Legislature, San Benito County is in the 17th senatorial district, represented by Democrat John Laird, and in the 29th Assembly district, represented by Democrat Robert Rivas.

=== Policing ===
Eric S. Taylor is the 16th elected Sheriff-Coroner-Marshal of San Benito County. He was appointed on June 25, 2021, and was elected in June 2022. His term began on January 2, 2023. The San Benito County Sheriff provides law enforcement services, search and rescue, court security, marshal services, correctional facility operations and coroner service for the entire county. It provides patrol and detective services for the unincorporated areas of the county. Hollister (the County Seat) has a municipal police department. The Sheriff is contracted to provide law enforcement service to the incorporated City of San Juan Bautista.

== Politics ==
San Benito is a Democratic-leaning county in Presidential and congressional elections. The last Republican to win a majority in the county was George H. W. Bush in 1988. San Benito is also considered a bellwether county for California in presidential elections; since 1904 the only candidates to carry the state without winning this county have been Franklin D. Roosevelt in 1944 and Harry S. Truman in 1948. The county's bellwether status goes beyond presidential politics to ballot initiatives and statewide candidates, as its election results mirror those of the state as a whole, as it straddles the major political fault lines of the state. Before 1904, however, it was a solidly Democratic county whilst the state leaned Republican, voting Democratic in every election from its creation in 1876 up to and including 1900, although California only voted Democratic in 1880 and 1892.

United States presidential election results for San Benito County, California (Note: This total comprised 1,054 votes for Progressive Theodore Roosevelt (who was official Republican nominee in California), 179 votes for Socialist Eugene V. Debs and 74 votes for Prohibition Party nominee Eugene W. Chafin.)
Year	Republican		Democratic		Third party(ies)	
Year	No.	%	No.	%	No.	%
1892	616	36.97%	759	45.56%	291	17.47%
1896	729	42.48%	956	55.71%	31	1.81%
1900	724	46.71%	786	50.71%	40	2.58%
1904	888	54.51%	645	39.59%	96	5.89%
1908	937	53.57%	684	39.11%	128	7.32%
1912	13	0.51%	1,253	48.70%	1,307	50.80%
1916	1,440	44.19%	1,688	51.80%	131	4.02%
1920	1,965	65.00%	900	29.77%	158	5.23%
1924	1,443	53.54%	361	13.40%	891	33.06%
1928	1,971	58.87%	1,366	40.80%	11	0.33%
1932	1,269	33.89%	2,283	60.98%	192	5.13%
1936	1,515	36.58%	2,565	61.93%	62	1.50%
1940	2,407	49.29%	2,441	49.99%	35	0.72%
1944	2,253	52.80%	1,998	46.82%	16	0.37%
1948	2,775	55.64%	2,096	42.03%	116	2.33%
1952	3,733	65.23%	1,968	34.39%	22	0.38%
1956	3,252	59.53%	2,201	40.29%	10	0.18%
1960	3,056	51.40%	2,876	48.38%	13	0.22%
1964	2,444	39.19%	3,779	60.59%	14	0.22%
1968	2,961	47.54%	2,809	45.10%	459	7.37%
1972	3,961	57.56%	2,582	37.52%	338	4.91%
1976	3,398	50.87%	3,122	46.74%	160	2.40%
1980	4,054	53.33%	2,749	36.16%	799	10.51%
1984	5,695	60.71%	3,554	37.89%	131	1.40%
1988	5,578	54.11%	4,559	44.23%	171	1.66%
1992	4,112	32.28%	5,354	42.03%	3,273	25.69%
1996	5,384	38.72%	7,030	50.55%	1,492	10.73%
2000	7,015	41.68%	9,131	54.25%	685	4.07%
2004	8,698	46.45%	9,851	52.61%	176	0.94%
2008	7,425	37.68%	11,917	60.48%	363	1.84%
2012	7,343	38.56%	11,276	59.21%	425	2.23%
2016	7,841	35.76%	12,521	57.11%	1,562	7.12%
2020	10,590	36.73%	17,628	61.14%	612	2.12%
2024	11,702	42.32%	15,179	54.89%	771	2.79%

As of May 2010, the California Secretary of State reports that San Benito County has 34,562 eligible voters. Of those 24,736 (71.57%) are registered voters. Of those, 11,959 (48.35%) are registered Democratic, 7,477 (30.23%) are registered Republican, 565 (2.28%)are registered American Independent, and 116 (0.47%) are Green Party. The two incorporated municipalities of Hollister and San Juan Bautista have Democratic majorities on their voter rolls, whereas the unincorporated areas of San Benito County have a small Republican plurality in voter registration.

=== Voter registration ===
Population and registered voters
Total population	54,873	
Registered voters (Note: Percentage of registered voters with respect to total population. Percentages of party members with respect to registered voters follow.)	26,694	48.6%
Democratic	12,643	47.4%
Republican	7,847	29.4%
Democratic–Republican spread	+4,796	+18.0%
Independent	679	2.5%
Green	144	0.5%
Libertarian	143	0.5%
Peace and Freedom	73	0.3%
Americans Elect	1	0.0%
Other	46	0.2%
No party preference	5,118	19.2%

==== Cities by population and voter registration ====
Cities by population and voter registration
City	Population	Registered voters	Democratic	Republican	D–R spread	Other	No party preference
Hollister	34,733	43.8%	53.6%	23.2%	+30.4%	6.3%	19.4%
San Juan Bautista	1,619	59.8%	50.8%	23.0%	+27.8%	9.8%	20.4%

== Crime ==
The following table includes the number of incidents reported and the rate per 1,000 persons for each type of offense as of 2013.

Population and crime rates
Population	54,873	
Violent crime	246	4.48
Homicide	0	0.00
Forcible rape	9	0.16
Robbery	54	0.98
Aggravated assault	183	3.33
Property crime	748	13.63
Burglary	445	8.11
Larceny-theft	535	9.75
Motor vehicle theft	129	2.35
Arson	8	0.15

=== Cities by population and crime rate as of 2013 ===
City	Population	Violent crimes	Violent crime rate per 1,000 persons	Property crimes	Property crime rate per 1,000 persons
Hollister	35,766	162	4.53	724	20.24

== Economy ==
The economy is statistically included in metro San Jose, though the dominant activity is agriculture. Agritourism is growing as the county has destination wineries, organic farms and quaint inns with views of cattle grazing. With concerns about how oil and gas operations could impact this sector of the economy and agriculture in general, the county voters approved a measure in 2014 that bans well stimulation techniques such as fracking, acidizing and steam injection, along with conventional drilling in some areas. In the 1950s, the oil drilling industry had many wells and the county is over the Monterey Shale formation but there is very little activity now.

=== Top employers ===
According to the San Benito County Economic Development Corporation of San Benito County, the top employers in the county are:

#	Employer	# of Employees
1	Earthbound Farm	1,000+
2	R&R Labor	500–999
3	Hazel Hawkins Memorial Hospital	250–499
4	Mcelectronics Inc.	250–499
5	San Benito High School	250–499
6	True Leaf Farms	250–499
7	Corbin Sparrow	100–249
8	Denise & Filice Packing Co	100–249
9	Nob Hill Foods	100–249
10	San Benito Foods	100–249
11	San Benito County Sheriff	100–249
12	Target	100–249
13	Trical Inc.	100–249
14	West Marine	100–249

== Media ==
San Benito County receives media in Monterey County, including the major Monterey County TV and radio stations.

The county also has several media outlets that serve the local community:

=== Television ===
CMAP TV - Community Media Access Partnership, based in Gilroy, operates Channels 17, 18, 19 & 20 on Charter/Spectrum Cable as well as streaming online, offering public access and educational programming to Gilroy and San Benito County as well as offering live civic meetings, including county government.

=== Radio ===
- KMPG, at 1520 AM daytime, plays regional Mexican music;
- KQKE, at 97.5 FM, "The Quake" San Benito County Community Radio provides a low power signal.
- KHRI, at 90.7 FM, is an affiliate of Air 1 playing contemporary Christian music;
- KXSM, at 93.1 FM, broadcasts a regional Mexican format.
- K206BQ, at 89.1 FM, rebroadcasts KLVM.
- K265DG, at 100.9 FM, rebroadcasts KPRC-FM.

=== Print ===
- The Hollister Free Lance, founded in 1873, is published weekly on Thursdays. The Freelance is now owned by New SV Media, Inc.and its main office is in Gilroy. New SV Media owns Good Times, Metro Silicon Valley, Pajaroan, Gilroy Dispatch, SantaCruz.com, King City Rustler and California Wheelin'.
- Mission Village Voice is a monthly paper based in San Juan Bautista. It is oriented toward arts, culture and community-wide events.

=== Online ===
- BenitoLink is a nonprofit news website covering San Benito County, run by local and regional residents.
- San Benito Live is a local news website, primarily focused on culture-related media.

== Transportation ==
=== Major highways ===
- US 101
- SR 25
- SR 129
- SR 146
- SR 156

=== Public transportation ===
San Benito County Express provides fixed route service in the city of Hollister, and intercity service in the northern portion of the county. Service operates as far north as Gilroy, in Santa Clara County.

=== Airports ===
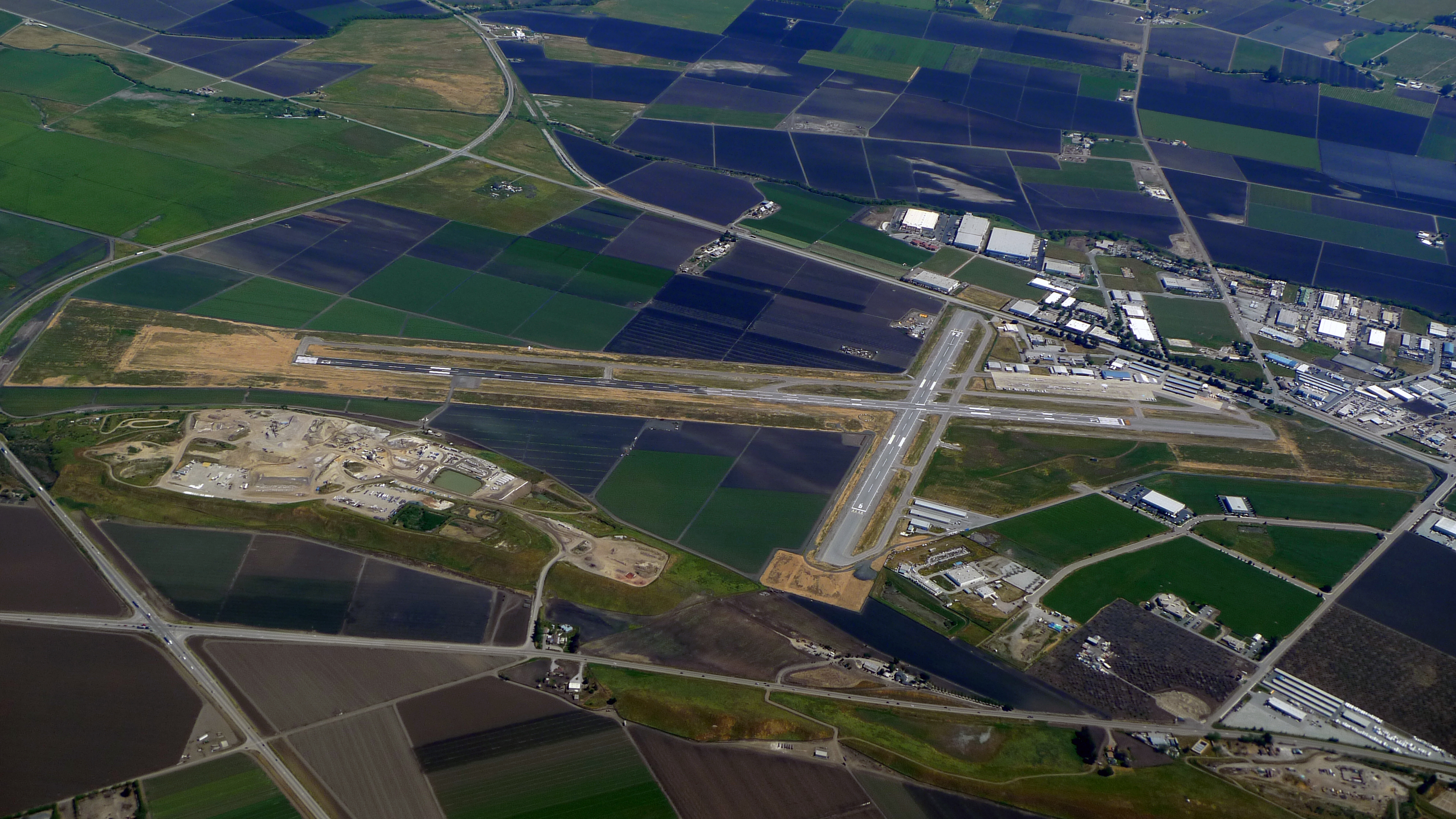
Hollister Municipal Airport

Hollister Municipal Airport is a general aviation airport located just north of Hollister.

== Communities ==
=== Cities ===
- Hollister (county seat)
- San Juan Bautista

=== Census-designated places ===
- Aromas
- Ridgemark
- Tres Pinos

=== Unincorporated communities ===
- Bitterwater
- Dunneville
- Hudner
- Paicines
- Panoche
- River Oaks
- San Benito
- Tres Pinos

=== Ghost town ===
- New Idria

=== Population ranking ===
The population ranking of the following table is based on the 20220 census of San Benito County.

† county seat

Rank	City/Town/etc.	Municipal type	Population (2020 census)
1	† Hollister	City	41,678
2	Ridgemark	CDP	3,212
3	Aromas (partially in Monterey County)	CDP	2,708
4	San Juan Bautista	City	2,089
5	Tres Pinos	CDP	443

== Education ==
PK-12 school districts include:

- Aromas-San Juan Unified School District
- Coalinga-Huron Unified School District

Secondary school districts include:

- San Benito High School District
- South Monterey County Joint Union High School District

Elementary school districts include:

- Bitterwater-Tully Union Elementary School District
- Cienega Union Elementary School District
- Hollister School District
- Jefferson Elementary School District
- North County Joint Union Elementary School District
- Panoche Elementary School District
- Southside Elementary School District
- Tres Pinos Union Elementary School District
- Willow Grove Union Elementary School District

== See also ==
- List of museums in the California Central Coast
- National Register of Historic Places listings in San Benito County, California
- George H. Moore, San Benito County district attorney
