= List of American Viticultural Areas =

Wine grape growing regions in America List

An American Viticultural Area (AVA) is a designated appellation for American wine in the United States distinguishable by geographic, geologic, and climatic features, with boundaries initially defined by the Bureau of Alcohol, Tobacco and Firearms (ATF) which was extensively reorganized under the provisions of the Homeland Security Act of 2002 creating the Alcohol and Tobacco Tax and Trade Bureau (TTB) of the United States Department of the Treasury. As of 2026, there are 280 recognized AVAs in 34 states several of which are shared by two or more states. Over half (154) of the AVAs are in California.

American Viticultural Areas range in size from the largest, Upper Mississippi River Valley AVA at 19 million acres (29,900 sq mi) across four states, to the smallest, Ulupalakua AVA on island of Maui, Hawaii being only 70 acres (0.11 sq mi). Augusta AVA surrounding the town of Augusta, Missouri, was the first federal viticultural area established on June 20, 1980. and the newest in March 2026 being Columbia Hills AVA in Washington state along the Columbia River.

== Arizona ==
- Sonoita AVA
- Verde Valley AVA
- Willcox AVA

== Arkansas ==
- Altus AVA
- Arkansas Mountain AVA
- Ozark Mountain AVA (shared with Missouri and Oklahoma)

== California ==
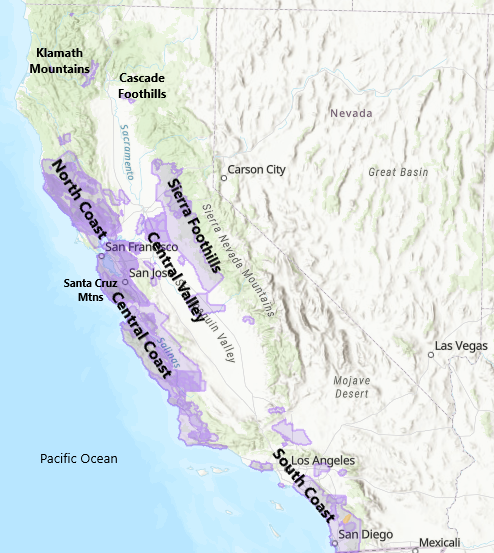
California's wine regions

=== Cascade Foothills ===
These AVAs are located in upper northern California, east of Redding.

- Inwood Valley AVA
- Manton Valley AVA

=== Central Coast ===
These AVAs are included in the geographic boundaries of the Central Coast AVA.

- Adelaida District AVA
- Alisos Canyon AVA
- Arroyo Grande Valley AVA
- Arroyo Seco AVA
- Ballard Canyon AVA
- Ben Lomond Mountain AVA
- Carmel Valley AVA
- Central Coast AVA
- Chalone AVA
- Cienega Valley AVA
- Contra Costa AVA
- Creston District AVA
- Edna Valley AVA
- El Pomar District AVA
- Gabilan Mountains AVA
- Hames Valley AVA
- Happy Canyon of Santa Barbara AVA
- Lamorinda AVA
- Lime Kiln Valley AVA
- Livermore Valley AVA
- Los Olivos District AVA
- Monterey AVA
- Mt. Harlan AVA
- Pacheco Pass AVA
- Paicines AVA
- Paso Robles AVA
- Paso Robles Estrella District AVA
- Paso Robles Geneseo District AVA
- Paso Robles Highlands District AVA
- Paso Robles Willow Creek District AVA
- San Antonio Valley AVA
- San Benito AVA
- San Bernabe AVA
- San Francisco Bay AVA
- San Juan Creek AVA
- San Lucas AVA
- San Luis Obispo Coast AVA
- San Miguel District AVA
- San Ysidro District AVA
- Santa Clara Valley AVA
- Santa Cruz Mountains AVA
- Santa Lucia Highlands AVA
- Santa Margarita Ranch AVA
- Santa Maria Valley AVA
- Santa Ynez Valley AVA
- Sta. Rita Hills AVA
- Templeton Gap District AVA
- York Mountain AVA

=== Central Valley ===
Unlike other regions of California, there is no large regional AVA designation that includes the entire Central Valley wine growing region.

- Alta Mesa AVA
- Borden Ranch AVA
- Capay Valley AVA
- Clarksburg AVA
- Clements Hills AVA
- Cosumnes River AVA
- Diablo Grande AVA
- Dunnigan Hills AVA
- Jahant AVA
- Lodi AVA
- Madera AVA
- Merritt Island AVA
- Mokelumne River AVA
- Paulsell Valley AVA
- River Junction AVA
- Salado Creek AVA
- Sloughhouse AVA
- Squaw Valley-Miramonte AVA
- Tracy Hills AVA
- Winters Highlands AVA

=== Klamath Mountains ===
These AVAs are located in the southern Klamath Mountains of far northwestern California.

- Seiad Valley AVA
- Trinity Lakes AVA
- Willow Creek AVA

=== North Coast ===
All of these AVAs are included within the geographic boundaries of the six-county North Coast AVA.

- Alexander Valley AVA
- Anderson Valley AVA
- Atlas Peak AVA
- Benmore Valley AVA
- Bennett Valley AVA
- Big Valley District-Lake County AVA
- Calistoga AVA
- Chalk Hill AVA
- Chiles Valley AVA
- Clear Lake AVA
- Cole Ranch AVA
- Comptche AVA
- Coombsville AVA
- Covelo AVA
- Crystal Springs of Napa Valley AVA
- Diamond Mountain District AVA
- Dos Rios AVA
- Dry Creek Valley AVA
- Eagle Peak Mendocino County AVA
- Fort Ross-Seaview AVA
- Fountaingrove District AVA
- Green Valley of Russian River Valley AVA
- Guenoc Valley AVA
- High Valley AVA
- Howell Mountain AVA
- Kelsey Bench-Lake County AVA
- Knights Valley AVA
- Long Valley-Lake County AVA
- Los Carneros AVA
- McDowell Valley AVA
- Mendocino AVA
- Mendocino Ridge AVA
- Moon Mountain District Sonoma County AVA
- Mt. Veeder AVA
- Napa Valley AVA
- North Coast AVA
- Northern Sonoma AVA
- Oak Knoll District of Napa Valley AVA
- Oakville AVA
- Petaluma Gap AVA
- Pine Mountain-Cloverdale Peak AVA
- Potter Valley AVA
- Red Hills Lake County AVA
- Redwood Valley AVA
- Rockpile AVA
- Russian River Valley AVA
- Rutherford AVA
- Solano County Green Valley AVA
- Sonoma Coast AVA
- Sonoma Mountain AVA
- Sonoma Valley AVA
- Spring Mountain District AVA
- St. Helena AVA
- Stags Leap District AVA
- Suisun Valley AVA
- Upper Lake Valley AVA
- West Sonoma Coast AVA
- Wild Horse Valley AVA
- Yorkville Highlands AVA
- Yountville AVA

=== Sierra Foothills ===
All of these AVAs are contained entirely within the geographic boundaries of the Sierra Foothills AVA.

- California Shenandoah Valley AVA
- El Dorado AVA
- Fair Play AVA
- Fiddletown AVA
- North Yuba AVA
- Sierra Foothills AVA

=== South Coast ===
These AVAs are entirely within the geographic boundaries of the Southern California region.

- Antelope Valley of the California High Desert AVA
- Cucamonga Valley AVA
- Leona Valley AVA
- Malibu Coast AVA
- Malibu-Newton Canyon AVA
- Palos Verdes Peninsula AVA
- Ramona Valley AVA
- Saddle Rock-Malibu AVA
- San Luis Rey AVA
- San Pasqual Valley AVA
- Sierra Pelona Valley AVA
- South Coast AVA
- Tehachapi Mountains AVA
- Temecula Valley AVA
- Yucaipa Valley AVA

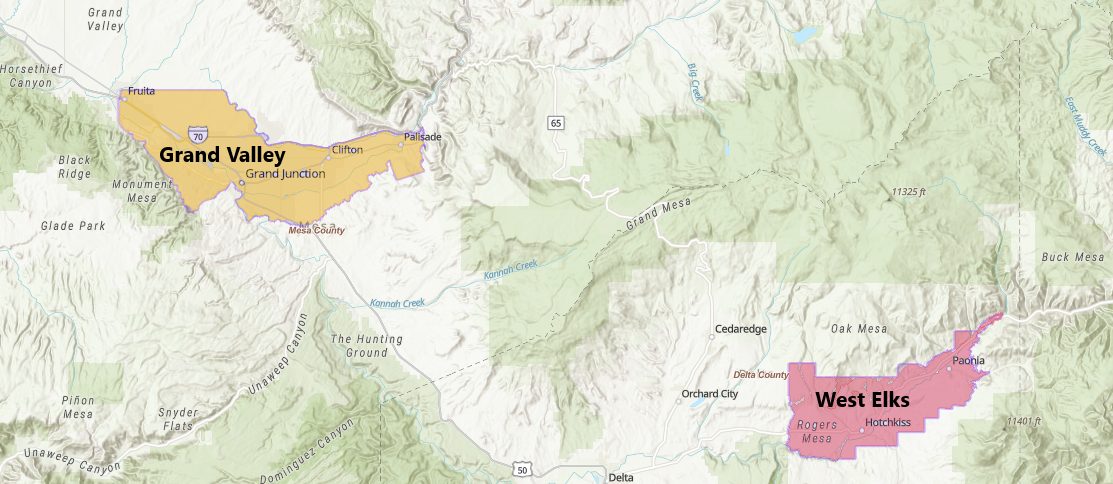
Colorado AVAs

== Colorado ==
- Grand Valley AVA
- West Elks AVA

== Connecticut ==
- Eastern Connecticut Highlands AVA
- Southeastern New England AVA (shared with Massachusetts and Rhode Island)
- Western Connecticut Highlands AVA

== Georgia ==
- Dahlonega Plateau AVA
- Upper Hiwassee Highlands AVA (shared with North Carolina)

== Hawaii ==
- Ulupalakua AVA

== Idaho ==
- Eagle Foothills AVA
- Lewis-Clark Valley AVA (shared with Washington)
- Snake River Valley AVA (shared with Oregon)

== Illinois ==
- Shawnee Hills AVA
- Upper Mississippi River Valley AVA (shared with Iowa, Minnesota, and Wisconsin)

== Indiana ==
- Indiana Uplands AVA
- Ohio River Valley AVA (shared with Kentucky, Ohio, and West Virginia)

== Iowa ==
- Loess Hills District AVA (shared with Missouri)
- Upper Mississippi River Valley AVA (shared with Illinois, Minnesota, and Wisconsin)

== Kentucky ==
- Ohio River Valley AVA (shared with Indiana, Ohio, and West Virginia)

== Louisiana ==
- Mississippi Delta AVA (shared with Mississippi and Tennessee)

== Maryland ==
- Catoctin AVA
- Cumberland Valley AVA (shared with Pennsylvania)
- Linganore AVA

== Massachusetts ==
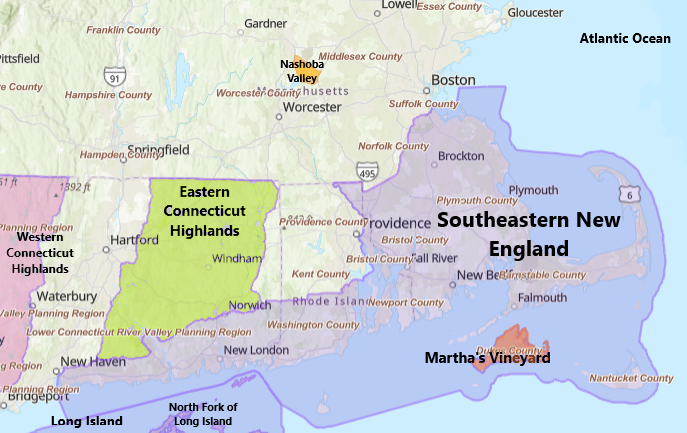
Massachusetts AVAs

- Martha's Vineyard AVA
- Nashoba Valley AVA
- Southeastern New England AVA (shared with Connecticut and Rhode Island)

== Michigan ==
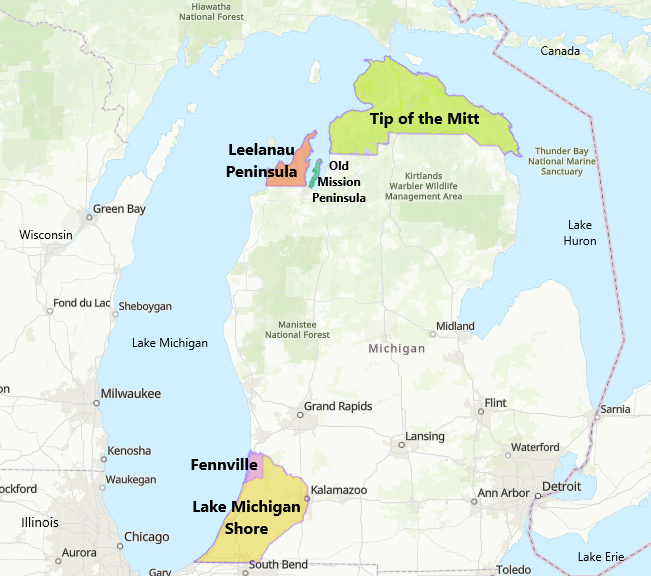
Michigan's five AVAs

- Fennville AVA
- Lake Michigan Shore AVA
- Leelanau Peninsula AVA
- Old Mission Peninsula AVA
- Tip of the Mitt AVA

== Minnesota ==
- Alexandria Lakes AVA
- Upper Mississippi River Valley AVA (shared with Illinois, Iowa, and Wisconsin)

== Mississippi ==
- Mississippi Delta AVA (shared with Louisiana and Tennessee)

== Missouri ==
- Augusta AVA
- Hermann AVA
- Loess Hills District AVA (shared with Iowa)
- Ozark Highlands AVA
- Ozark Mountain AVA (shared with Arkansas and Oklahoma)

== New Jersey ==
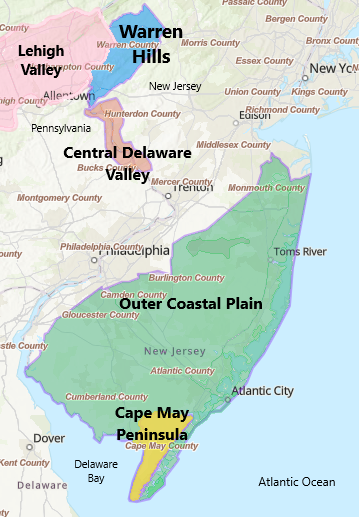
New Jersey AVAs adjacent to PA's Lehigh Valley

- Cape May Peninsula AVA
- Central Delaware Valley AVA (shared with Pennsylvania)
- Outer Coastal Plain AVA
- Warren Hills AVA

== New Mexico ==
- Mesilla Valley AVA (shared with Texas)
- Middle Rio Grande Valley AVA
- Mimbres Valley AVA

== New York ==
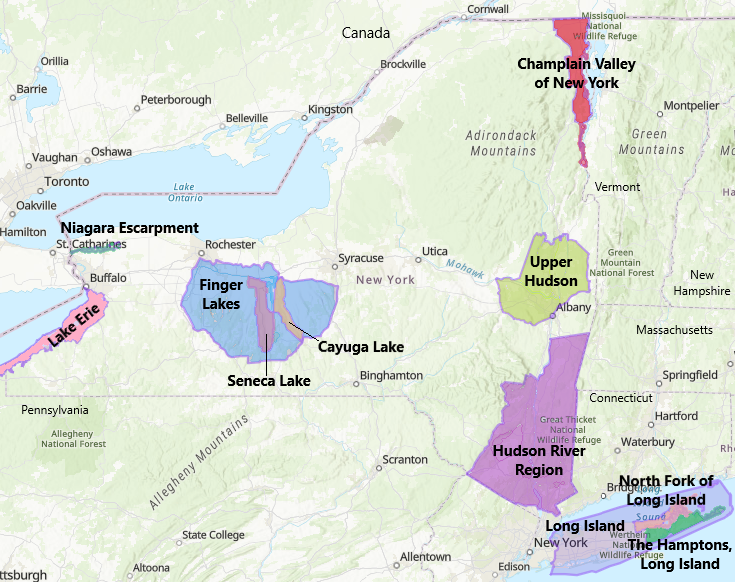
New York wine regions

- Cayuga Lake AVA
- Champlain Valley of New York AVA
- Finger Lakes AVA
- Hudson River Region AVA
- Lake Erie AVA (shared with Ohio and Pennsylvania)
- Long Island AVA
- Niagara Escarpment AVA
- North Fork of Long Island AVA
- Seneca Lake AVA
- The Hamptons, Long Island AVA
- Upper Hudson AVA

== North Carolina ==
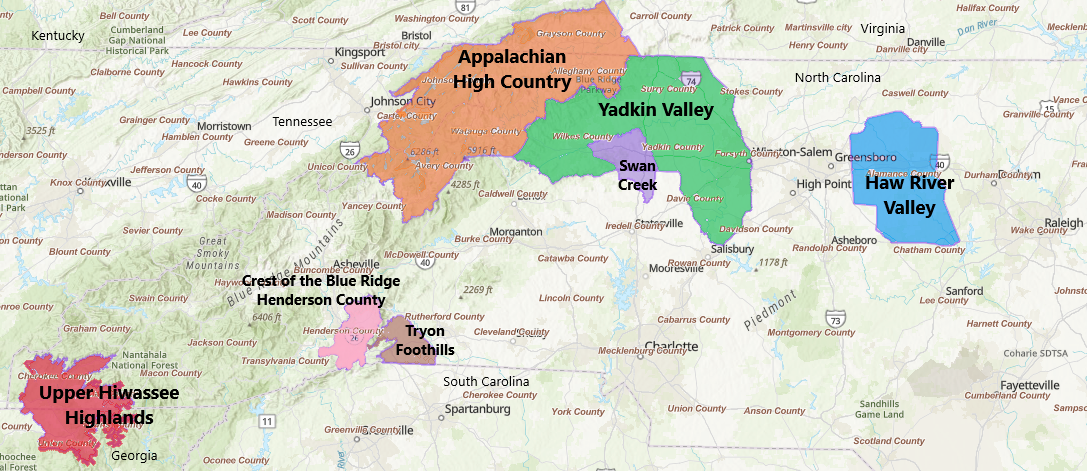
North Carolina wine regions

- Appalachian High Country AVA (shared with Tennessee and Virginia)
- Crest of the Blue Ridge Henderson County AVA
- Haw River Valley AVA
- Swan Creek AVA
- Tryon Foothills AVA
- Upper Hiwassee Highlands AVA (shared with Georgia)
- Yadkin Valley AVA

== Ohio ==
- Grand River Valley AVA
- Isle St. George AVA
- Lake Erie AVA (shared with New York and Pennsylvania)
- Loramie Creek AVA
- Ohio River Valley AVA (shared with Indiana, Kentucky, and West Virginia)

== Oklahoma ==
- Ozark Mountain AVA (shared with Arkansas and Missouri)

== Oregon ==
Oregon map featuring its 23 AVAs courtesy of the Oregon Wine Board 2026

- Applegate Valley AVA
- Chehalem Mountains AVA
- Columbia Gorge AVA (shared with Washington)
- Columbia Valley AVA (shared with Washington)
- Dundee Hills AVA
- Elkton Oregon AVA
- Eola-Amity Hills AVA
- Laurelwood District AVA
- Lower Long Tom AVA
- McMinnville AVA
- Mount Pisgah, Polk County, Oregon AVA
- Red Hill Douglas County, Oregon AVA
- Ribbon Ridge AVA
- The Rocks District of Milton-Freewater AVA
- Rogue Valley AVA
- Snake River Valley AVA (shared with Idaho)
- Southern Oregon AVA
- Tualatin Hills AVA
- Umpqua Valley AVA
- Van Duzer Corridor AVA
- Walla Walla Valley AVA (shared with Washington)
- Willamette Valley AVA
- Yamhill-Carlton AVA

== Pennsylvania ==
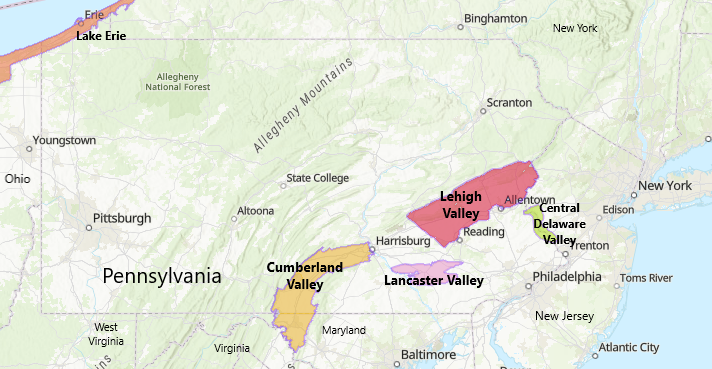
Pennsylvania AVAs

- Central Delaware Valley AVA (shared with New Jersey)
- Cumberland Valley AVA (shared with Maryland)
- Lake Erie AVA (shared with New York and Ohio)
- Lancaster Valley AVA
- Lehigh Valley AVA

== Rhode Island ==
- Southeastern New England AVA (shared with Connecticut and Massachusetts)

== Tennessee ==
- Appalachian High Country AVA (shared with North Carolina and Virginia)
- Mississippi Delta AVA (shared with Louisiana and Mississippi)
- Nine Lakes of East Tennessee AVA
- Upper Cumberland AVA

== Texas ==
- Bell Mountain AVA
- Escondido Valley AVA
- Fredericksburg in the Texas Hill Country AVA
- Mesilla Valley AVA (shared with New Mexico)
- Texas Davis Mountains AVA
- Texas High Plains AVA
- Texas Hill Country AVA
- Texoma AVA

== Virginia ==
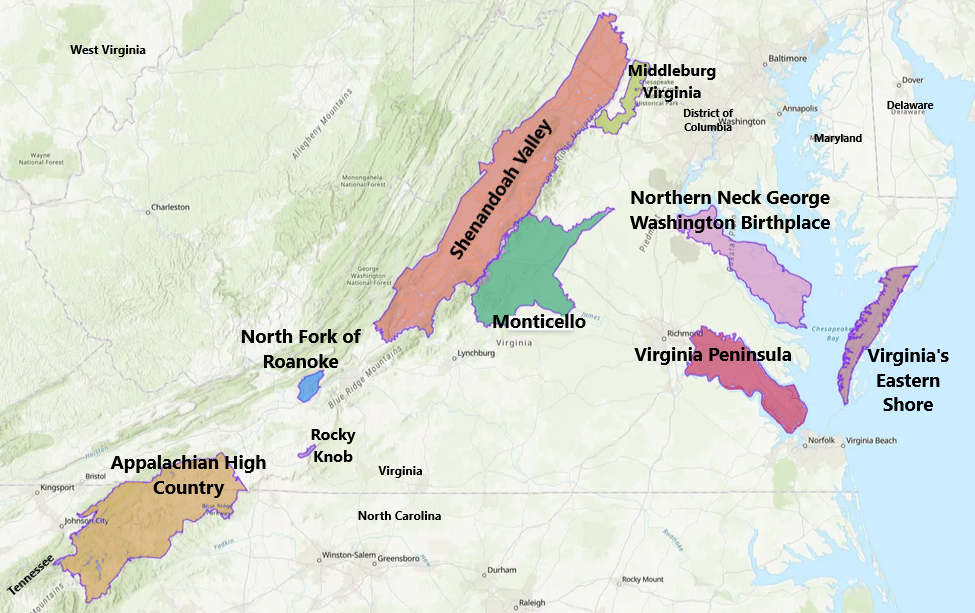
Virginia AVAs as of 2024

- Appalachian High Country AVA (shared with North Carolina and Tennessee)
- Middleburg Virginia AVA
- Monticello AVA
- North Fork of Roanoke AVA
- Northern Neck George Washington Birthplace AVA
- Rocky Knob AVA
- Shenandoah Valley AVA (shared with West Virginia)
- Virginia's Eastern Shore AVA
- Virginia Peninsula AVA

== Washington ==
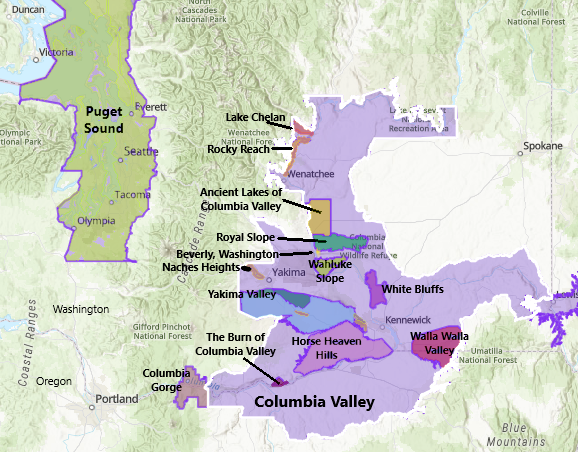
Washington's AVAs as of 2026

- Ancient Lakes of the Columbia Valley AVA
- Beverly, Washington AVA
- Candy Mountain AVA
- Columbia Gorge AVA (shared with Oregon)
- Columbia Hills AVA
- Columbia Valley AVA (shared with Oregon)
- Goose Gap AVA
- Horse Heaven Hills AVA
- Lake Chelan AVA
- Lewis-Clark Valley AVA (shared with Idaho)
- Naches Heights AVA
- Puget Sound AVA
- Rattlesnake Hills AVA
- Red Mountain AVA
- Rocky Reach AVA
- Royal Slope AVA
- Snipes Mountain AVA
- The Burn of Columbia Valley AVA
- Wahluke Slope AVA
- Walla Walla Valley AVA (shared with Oregon)
- White Bluffs AVA
- Yakima Valley AVA

== West Virginia ==
- Kanawha River Valley AVA
- Ohio River Valley AVA (shared with Indiana, Kentucky, and Ohio)
- Shenandoah Valley AVA (shared with Virginia)

== Wisconsin ==
- Lake Wisconsin AVA
- Upper Mississippi River Valley AVA (shared with Illinois, Iowa, and Minnesota)
- Wisconsin Ledge AVA
