= Inwood Valley AVA =

Appellation that designates wine in Shasta County, California

Coordinates: 40°30′42″N 121°58′59″W

Inwood Valley
- Wine region
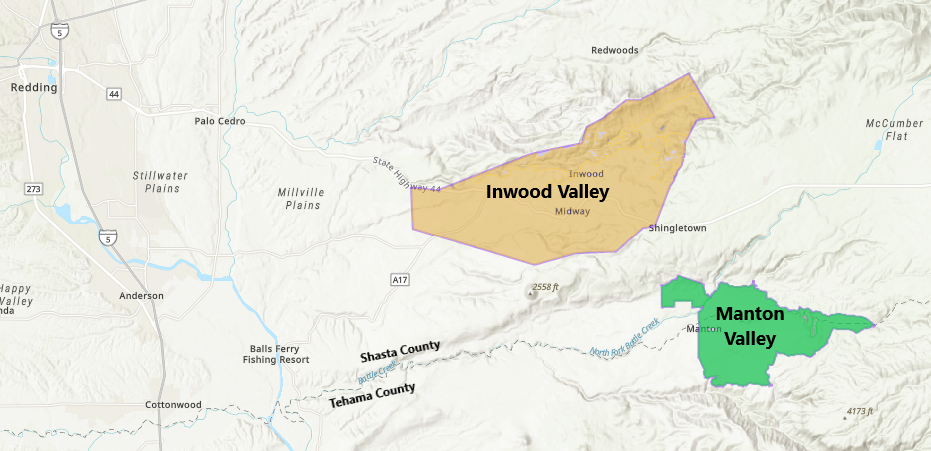
- Type: American Viticultural Area
- Year established: 2012
- Country: United States
- Part of: California, Shasta County
- Other regions in California, Shasta County: Manton Valley AVA
- Growing season: 243 days
- Climate region: Region II–III
- Heat units: 2,700-3,400 GDD units
- Precipitation (annual average): 56.6 in (1,437.6 mm)
- Total area: 28,441 acres (44 sq mi)
- Size of planted vineyards: 62.5 acres (25 ha)
- No. of vineyards: 5
- Grapes produced: Cabernet Franc, Cabernet Sauvignon, Chardonnay, Merlot, Syrah, Zinfandel
- No. of wineries: 1

Inwood Valley is an American Viticultural Area (AVA) located in southern Shasta County in north-central California. It was established as the nation's 205th, the state's 125th and the county's initial appellation on September 12, 2012, by the Alcohol and Tobacco Tax and Trade Bureau (TTB), Treasury after reviewing the petition submitted by consulting geographer Patrick Shabram, on behalf of himself and Anselmo Vineyards of Inwood Valley, proposing a viticultural area named "Inwood Valley."
Inwood is the name of a small, rural community located within the Inwood Valley, as shown on the USGS Inwood quadrangle map. It is located approximately 22 miles (35 km) from the county seat of Redding along State Route 44 East toward Lassen Volcanic National Park. Inwood Road is the primary route through the Inwood Valley viticultural area. Local grape growers and winemakers use the terms "Inwood Valley" and "Inwood" to describe their vineyard locations. For example, Anselmo Vineyards is "nestled in the rolling hills of Inwood Valley," and another winery, the Lassen Peak Winery, states that it is located in the "Inwood area of Shingletown" which is a town adjacent to the AVA's southern boundary line. The TTB determined Inwood Valley AVA contains approximately 28,441 acres (44 sq mi) with 62.5 acres (25 ha) on 5 commercially-producing vineyards and 14 acres (6 ha) planned for further viticultural development. Inwood Valley viticultural area, located in rural, southern Shasta County in north-central California, does not overlap, or otherwise involve, any existing or proposed viticultural areas.

== History ==
Viticulture in the Inwood Valley predates Prohibition, with local accounts suggesting that the first plantings were done by Elijah Boots as early as 1864 at one of the existing Lassen Peak vineyards. Evidence of this early viticulture is still present on the Lassen Peak vineyard property by wild mission grapes growing on the property. According to Mike Bouhlert at Lassen Peak Winery, the identity of these wild vines as mission grapes has been confirmed by viticulturists at the University of California, Davis. The wild vines are the remnants of the original maintained mission vines in the vineyard, which were apparently removed in response to Prohibition and replaced with apple orchards until reverted to vineyards by Lassen Peak Winery.
Viticulture after Prohibition re-appeared in the late 1970s when ten acres of Merlot were planted by Marilyn Goggin after purchasing part of the current Seven Hills Ranch and Vineyard property in 1977. The name of the ranch was changed to Inwood Ranch and Vineyard at that time. Lassen Peak Winery planted vines in 1982. The date of other plantings in the area are not known by the petitioner. In addition to viticulture, the Inwood Valley has a long reputation as an agricultural area, with farming dating back to the mid-19th century.
Among the notoriety of Inwood is the belief that it was the location where the last grizzly bear killed in California was shot in 1895. Along with nearby Shingletown and Whitmore, around that time Inwood was known for "their dances, all-night parties, and masquerade balls." Most of the economic activity in the late 19th century centered around lumber, but a local rancher by the name of Att Aldrige was responsible for the construction of several ditches with the purpose of irrigating the Inwood Valley. Despite the importance of lumber, the community within the Inwood Valley was nonetheless agrarian and agriculture was present with many products sold to nearby mining and lumbering operations.

== Terroir ==
=== Geology ===
The geology of the Inwood Valley viticultural area is dominated by volcanic lava flow and pyroclastic deposits associated with past eruptions that formed the Tuscan Formation, which is a subset of the Cascade Range Province. The lava flows occurred beginning around 4 million years ago and continued through geologically recent times. The Tuscan Formation overlies the Chico Formation, which is composed of Cretaceous sedimentary rock that was created when the area was under water. The Chico Formation is exposed along some tributary depressions and in Bear Creek Canyon, which is located within the viticultural area. The Tuscan Formation is overlain in places by porous Quaternary basalt and andesite lava flows, although it is also exposed in many locations within the viticultural area. The Tuscan Formation is made of highly permeable rock, which holds large amounts of water and serves as a natural aquifer for the greater Sacramento Valley region. Some areas of the Tuscan Formation are exposed at its higher eastern elevations, which serve as recharging points for the aquifer's underground water flows. As a result, the exposure of the Tuscan Formation in some locations in the Inwood Valley viticultural area creates an unusually large number of springs in the Inwood Valley region, which provide an important agricultural resource for area vineyards.
To the west of the Inwood Valley viticultural area, basalt flows overlie Tuscan Formation materials that flowed into the lower Redding Basin. The underlying geology is dominated by the Red Bluff Formation, characterized by older, thin sedimentary deposits (Pleistocene). In his geographic analysis submitted in support of the petition, Mr. Shabram explains that this geological distinction demonstrates a significant difference between the Inwood Valley region and the Redding Basin to the west, into which Bear Creek flows before joining the Sacramento River. The higher elevation Cascade Range lies to the east of the Inwood Valley viticultural area.

=== Topography ===
The Inwood Valley viticultural area is a unique valley landform that lies in a vertical transition zone. Most of the Inwood Valley region is located at elevations around 2,000 feet (610 m), according to the USGS maps. The Inwood Valley viticultural area is part of the large Bear Creek watershed, which has east-to-west elevations between 6,740 and 370 feet (2,050 and 110 m), ranging from the Cascade Range down to the Sacramento River. As shown on the USGS maps, elevations in the Inwood Valley region descend east-to-west as the valley runs from the Cascade Range to the Redding Basin. There are steep terrain and higher elevations to the east of the Inwood Valley viticultural area toward the 10,335-foot (3,150 m) Lassen Peak in the Cascade Range. The low, flat Redding Basin, at only 564 feet (172 m) in elevation, is to the west of the Inwood Valley viticultural area. The 1,000-and-3,000-foot (300 and 910 m) elevations of the Inwood Valley viticultural area distinguish it viticulturally from the surrounding areas. Above 3,000 feet (910 m) in elevation, the terrain ascends steeply to the Cascade Range in the east, according to USGS maps. Along the high eastern portion of the boundary line of the Inwood Valley viticultural area is a 3,471-foot (1,058 m) unnamed peak in the Cascade Range, according to the USGS maps. The steep terrain, high elevation, and low temperatures in this region render it unsuitable for viticulture. Farther to the west, the lower and flatter elevations outside of the Inwood Valley viticultural area around Redding contrast to the approximately 900 to 1,000 feet (270–300 m) elevations that define much of the western portion of the viticultural area boundary line. To the north and south of the Inwood Valley region, ridges at higher elevations form natural boundaries between the Bear Creek watershed and other watersheds. The steep terrain along these ridges is generally unsuitable for viticulture.

=== Climate ===
The growing season data in the petition for the Inwood Valley viticultural area is measured according to the Winkler climate classification system. In the Inwood Valley viticultural area, growing season temperatures range from 2,700 to 3,400 GDD units, according to 1978–99 data from vineyard owner Michael Boehlert at Lassen Peak Winery. The temperatures of the Inwood Valley viticultural area are a combination of Regions II and III, which are cooler than the Region V temperatures to the west, and they are warmer than the much cooler mountainous regions to the east and the cooler ridges to the immediate north and south. Beyond the adjacent ridges, the surrounding valleys to the north and south of the Inwood Valley viticultural area have Region IV growing season temperatures, which are warmer than the viticultural area. Mr. Shabram explains that growing season temperatures in the Inwood Valley viticultural area are greatly influenced by the valley's east–west funnel shape and consistent winds, as well as by its proximity to higher, cooler elevations on three sides. In addition, a reduction in solar radiation in the early and late months of the growing season results from the narrow valley floor and high flanking ridgelines that obscure the sun. Beyond the north and south ridgelines are small valleys with varying climatic influences and different watersheds. A cooling pattern of nighttime mountain breezes also significantly affects the growing season temperatures of the Inwood Valley viticultural area. In the evening, cold, heavy air drains downward into the valley, primarily from the Cascade Range to the east and, to a lesser extent, from the north and south ridgelines. The funnel of air that moves down slope through the valley intensifies the cooling effect of the surrounding air drainage. The nighttime cooling effect is most predominant in the summer months as it buffers the effect of the warm western wind pattern from the Redding Basin. The nighttime down slope wind speeds, moving east-to-west through Inwood Valley, vary from 5 to 7 mph (8.0–11.3 km/h), according to Mr. Boehlert. To the east of the Inwood Valley viticultural area, temperatures decrease as the elevation increases. The 5,677-foot (1,730 m) elevation Manzanita Lake, located in the Cascade Range, is approximately 20 miles (32 km) east of Inwood Valley. Mr. Shabram states that the region to the east of the viticultural area is not conducive to viticulture based on mean temperatures that are above 50 °F (10 °C) only 4 months per year. To the south of the Inwood Valley viticultural area, near Volta powerhouses, temperatures yield 3,965 GDD units, a high Region IV growing season, according to data from Lassen Peak Winery. The Redding Basin lies to the west of the Inwood Valley viticultural area, which is an area known for hot days and warm nights during the growing season. The lower elevations of the Redding Basin result in higher temperatures as compared to the Inwood Valley region. The Redding Basin averages a hot Region V growing season at 4,564 GDD units, according to data from the Western Regional Climate Center (WRCC). The 3,000-foot (910 m) elevation Bear Creek Ridge lies to the north of the Inwood Valley viticultural area. The petition provides two 2008 Region IV heat summation totals for the area near Whitmore, also to the north of the viticultural area: 3,642 and 3,941 GDD units. These temperatures indicate warmer growing season temperatures than the Inwood Valley region.
The average precipitation in the Inwood Valley viticultural area is 56.6 inches (1,440 mm) annually, with an average of 14.2 inches (360 mm) of precipitation during the growing season. The Inwood Valley viticultural area is wetter, both annually and during the growing season, than all of the surrounding areas. For example, the Inwood Valley region on average receives 10.8 in (270 mm) more precipitation annually than Shingletown and 28.6 inches (730 mm) more precipitation annually than Burney, which are located to the south and north of the Inwood Valley viticultural area, respectively. In addition, the growing season precipitation average in the Inwood Valley viticultural area, a viticulturally important factor, is approximately 2 inches (51 mm) more than Shingletown and 7 inches (180 mm) more than Burney.

=== Soil ===
There are 27 different soil series within the Inwood Valley viticultural area. The diversity in soil series results from volcanic activity that created various volcanic parent materials, the exposure of Cretaceous sedimentary parent materials, and the transitional and varied nature of the vegetation in the region. Despite this diversity, however, the top 5 soil series in the area cover approximately 71.4 percent of the viticultural area, and all of the soils within the boundary line are generally moderately well-drained and share a similar color and texture. According to Mr. Shabram, the soil types of the Inwood Valley viticultural area are distinguishable from the soils of the surrounding regions. For example, the mostly volcanic parent materials of the Inwood Valley region soils are in marked contrast to the primarily sedimentary parent material in soils found in Redding, to the west of the viticultural area. In addition, according to Mr. Shabram, none of the deep alluvial deposits found to the west and southwest of the Inwood Valley viticultural area in the Redding Basin and Sacramento Valley floor are found within Inwood Valley. Mr. Shabram further notes that the varied organic composition of the soils in the viticultural area reflects the unique climate and the distinctively transitional vegetation of the Inwood Valley region, particularly as compared to the surrounding regions. The dominant soil type in the Inwood Valley viticultural area is the Aiken series, which accounts for nearly 25 percent of the soil in the area, as well as the majority of the area currently planted to vineyards. Aiken soils are derived from basic volcanic rock, with conifers and mixed hardwoods (particularly Ponderosa pine) contributing to the organic component of the soil. Generally located on gently rolling, broad, tabular slopes, Aiken soils cover most of the Inwood Valley floor as well as portions of the Shingletown Ridge in the southeastern portion of the viticultural area. In the western portion of the viticultural area, Guenoc series soil is increasingly present, along with small pockets of Toomes loam, Aiken loam, and Anita clay. In contrast, soils to the west of the viticultural area are dominated by Guenoc and Toomes series soils; there are no Aiken soils located in this region. Guenoc series soils are formed from weathered igneous parent material, particularly basaltic rock, and include organic influences of annual grasses and foothill woodland vegetation. Toomes soils are shallow soils typically consisting of well-drained to excessively well-drained gravelly loam, with volcanic parent materials and annual grasses as organic influences. The areas to the east and southeast of the viticultural area are dominated by Cohasset, Windy, and McCarthy loams, all of which are generally found at high elevations (above 5,600 ft (1,700 m)), are influenced by conifers, and are indicative of the elevations and volcanic parent material in the area. The soils along the ridges and in the adjacent valleys to the north and south of the viticultural area are highly variable. The adjacent valley to the north lacks the Aiken loams found in the floor of Inwood Valley. Although some Aiken series soils are present in pockets in areas to the southeast of the viticultural area, those soils are adjacent to Cohasset series soils, indicating that the soils in those areas are subject to different climactic and vegetative influences.
