= Kookamunga =

Kookamunga may refer to:

- Kookamunga National Forest, a fictional location in the animated series Iggy Arbuckle
- Cucamonga Valley in California, US
- Rancho Cucamonga, California, a city
