= Volcano Winery =

Volcano Winery is one of three commercial wineries in the U.S. state of Hawaii, and the first winery founded on the Big Island of Hawaii in the town of Volcano, Hawaiʻi, near the summit of the active shield volcano Kīlauea. It is the southernmost winery in the United States. The winery is located on a fault line that runs near Mauna Loa.

== History ==
Volcano Winery was founded in 1986 by retired veterinarian Lynn “Doc” McKinney. The winery was sold in 1999 to Del Bothof, and the Bothof family still owns and runs the winery. The winery receives over 40,000 visitors a year.

== Wines ==
Volcano winery makes several wines from the Symphony grape as well as fruit wines from and jaboticaba berries and guava fruit. The Symphony Mele wine won the gold medal at the 2004 Finger Lakes International Wine Competition in the Finger Lakes region, scoring higher than 3000 other wines in the competition.

== See also ==
- Hawaii wine
