= Hawaii wine =

Wine from the U.S. state of Hawaii

Hawaii
- Wine region
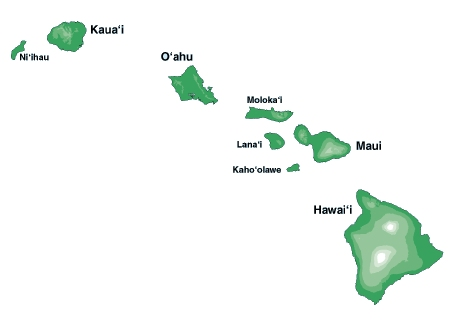
- Map of the major islands of the State Of Hawai'i
- Official name: State of Hawaii
- Type: U.S. State Appellation
- Year established: 1959
- Years of wine industry: 211
- Country: United States
- Sub-regions: Ulupalakua AVA
- Growing season: 175-200 days
- Climate region: Region V
- Soil conditions: Kula cobbly loam
- Total area: 7 million acres (10,931 sq mi)
- Size of planted vineyards: 16+ acres (6.5+ ha)
- Grapes produced: Chenin Blanc, Gewurztraminer, Grenache, Malbec, Symphony, Syrah, Petite Sirah and Viognier
- No. of wineries: 3

Hawaii wine is wine made in the U.S. state appellation of Hawaii. State names in the United States automatically qualify as legal appellations of origin for wine produced from grapes grown in that state and do not require registration with the Alcohol and Tobacco Tax and Trade Bureau (TTB) of the Treasury Department. TTB was created in January 2003, when the Bureau of Alcohol, Tobacco and Firearms, or ATF, was extensively reorganized under the provisions of the Homeland Security Act of 2002.

Viticulture in Hawaii has roots back into the early 1800's when cuttings from plants brought to Oahu by Spanish horticulturist, Don Francisco de Paula Marin established Hawaii's first grape vineyard in 1815. The bulk of the Hawaii's wine is produced on the island of Maui, though there is some production on the island of Hawaii. The state mainly produces fruit wine such as a pineapple sparkling wine.
In June 2021, Ulupalakua AVA was established on Maui as the state's initial American Viticultural Area (AVA) and the only one outside of the mainland United States.

== Grapes and wines ==
The Symphony grape is the principal grape wine made in the state and produces an off-dry, fruity white wine. Viticulture in Hawaii is made possible by the higher elevation of the area's volcanic mountains and ridges.

== Availability within the United States ==
A law passed in 2001 and signed by Governor Ben Cayetano opened up the Hawaiian wine industry to more domestic trading within the mainland United States. The new law allows the state to enter into reciprocal trade agreements with other states, enabling residents of Hawaii to purchase wine directly from wineries in those states in exchange for those states allowing Hawaiian wineries to sell wine in those states without having to go through a wholesaler in the typical three-tier distribution system.

== Winery and Vineyards ==
Three main winery-vineyards operate in Hawaii:

- Maui Wine, formerly Tedeschi Vineyards (on Maui)
- Volcano Winery (on Hawaiʻi Island)
- Oeno Winemaking (on Oahu)

In November 2020, the Alcohol and Tobacco Tax and Trade Bureau (TTB) received a petition submitted by Mark Beaman, winemaker at Maui Wines, proposing the viticultural area named "Ulupalakua" on the island of Maui. The proposed area was located within the 18,000 acres (28 sq mi) Ulupalakua Ranch covering approximately 70 acres (0.11 sq mi) with about 16 acres (6.5 ha) under vine. On June 30, 2021, the TTB established the Ulupalakua AVA.
