= Cucamonga Valley AVA =

American Viticultural Area in California

Coordinates: 34°07′27″N 117°31′53″W

Cucamonga Valley
- Wine region
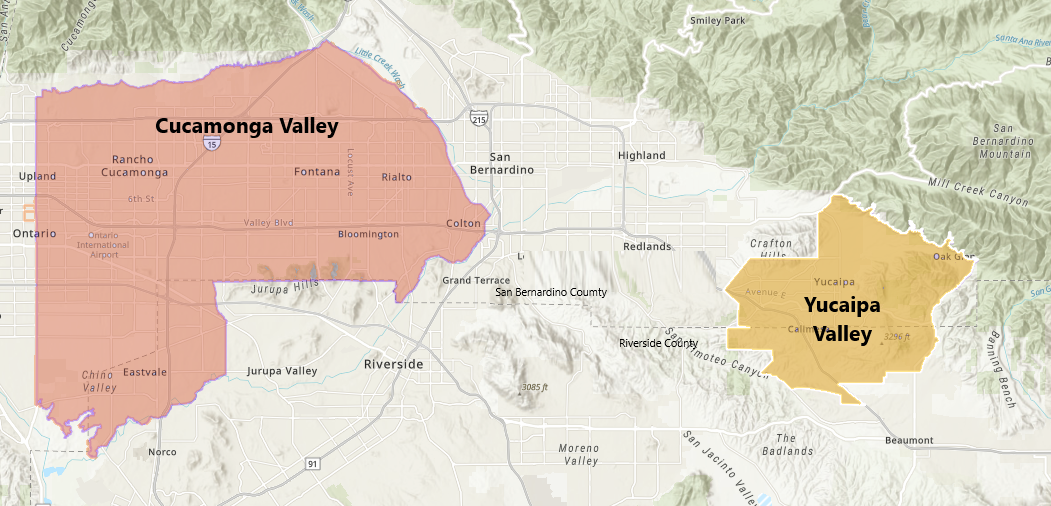
- Type: American Viticultural Area
- Year established: 1995
- Years of wine industry: 188
- Country: United States
- Part of: California, Riverside County, San Bernardino County
- Other regions in California, Riverside County, San Bernardino County: Yucaipa Valley AVA
- Climate region: Region IV
- Heat units: 3501–4000 GDD units
- Soil conditions: alluvial valley floors, fans and terraces derived from granitic rock
- Total area: 109,400 acres (171 sq mi)
- Size of planted vineyards: 2,000 acres (809 ha)
- Grapes produced: Aleatico, Alicante Bouschet, Cabernet Franc, Cabernet Sauvignon, Chasselas, Grenache, Merlot, Mission, Mourvedre, Palomino, Pedro Ximenes, Petite Sirah, Syrah, Zinfandel

Cucamonga Valley {/ˌkuːkəˈmʌŋɡə/ koo-kuh-MOHN-guh) is an American Viticultural Area (AVA) straddling the border of Riverside and San Bernardino Counties, California in the Cucamonga Valley region of the Pomona Valley, about 15 miles (24 km) west of San Bernardino. It was established as the nation's 126^{th}, the state's 74^{th}, Riverside County’s third and San Bernardino County's initial AVA on March 31, 1995, by the Bureau of Alcohol, Tobacco and Firearms (ATF), Treasury after reviewing the petition submitted from Gino L. Filippi of J. Filippi Vintage Co. on behalf of himself, local grape growers and vintners to propose a viticultural area known as "Cucamonga Valley." The AVA designation enables wineries to use the name "Cucamonga Valley" on their wine labels when utilizing at least 85% Cucamonga Valley grapes.

Cucamonga Valley has a warm climate for viniculture, with summer temperatures often exceeding 100 °F (38 °C). The valley floor is sandy, alluvial soils. Pierce's disease has affected vines in the valley. The USDA plant hardiness zones range from 9b to 10a.

== History ==
Grape cultivation began in the Cucamonga Valley in 1838 by Tiburcio Tapia on the Rancho Cucamonga, a Mexican land grant in Alta California. In 1859 rancher John Rains began large vine plantings in Cucamonga, introducing agriculture on a large scale to replace traditional cattle and sheep raising in the region. By 1917 the Cucamonga-Guasti vineyards spanned over 20,000 acres (31 sq mi), and Secondo Guasti was advertising his vineyard as "The Largest in the World."

When Prohibition began in 1920, the Cucamonga Valley produced more wine grapes than Napa and Sonoma Counties combined. In 1910, the former Mission Vineyard winery, later known as the Virginia Dare Winery, was established in the town of Rancho Cucamonga followed by others including the Thomas Brothers Winery, G. Filippi and Son Winery, and Ellena Bros./Regina Winery.

Following Prohibition and its Repeal in 1933, the wine industry and other agricultural businesses in the Cucamonga Valley faced increasing pressure from the urban expansion of Los Angeles and Orange Counties. During the 1970s, agricultural land in Cucamonga Valley underwent massive conversion and loss to suburbanization, for families from those counties seeking affordable housing.

The Joseph Filippi Winery & Vineyards and other vintners and growers in the area worked to attain the AVA designation, and have been bringing back winemaking to the Cucamonga Valley.

== Wineries ==
| Name | City | Year of creation |
|---|---|---|
| Biane Brothers Winery | Rancho Cucamonga, CA | 1832 |
| Scythian Wine Co. | Fontana, CA | 2021 |
| Galleano Winery | Mira Loma, CA | 1927 |
| Joseph Filippi Winery & Vineyards (Closed 2025) | Rancho Cucamonga, CA | 1922 |
| Rancho De Philo Winery | Rancho Cucamonga, CA | 1974 |

== See also ==
- Cucamonga Winery
