= Ulupalakua AVA =

American Viticultural Area in Hawaii

Coordinates: 20°38′55″N 156°23′51″W

Ulupalakua
- Wine region
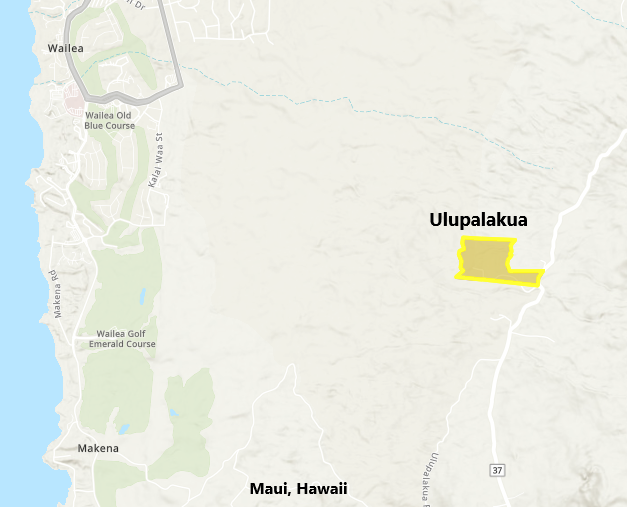
- Type: American Viticultural Area
- Year established: 2021
- Years of wine industry: 116
- Country: United States
- Part of: Hawaii
- Growing season: 175-200 days
- Climate region: Region V
- Heat units: 5,580 GDD units
- Precipitation (annual average): 30.7 in (780 mm)
- Soil conditions: Kula cobbly loam
- Total area: 70 acres (0.11 sq mi)
- Size of planted vineyards: 16 acres (6.5 ha)
- No. of vineyards: 1
- Grapes produced: Chenin Blanc, Gewurztraminer, Grenache, Malbec, Syrah, Petite Sirah and Viognier

Ulupalakua is the initial American Viticultural Area (AVA) in the state of Hawaii located on the island of Maui. It was established as the nation's 257^{th} appellation on June 30, 2021 by the Alcohol and Tobacco Tax and Trade Bureau (TTB), Treasury after reviewing the petition submitted by Mark Beaman, winemaker at Maui Wines, proposing a viticultural area named "Ulupalakua."
The viticultural area is located within the historic privately owned, 18,000-acre (28 sq mi), Ulupalakua Ranch on the western slopes of Mount Haleakala, a massive shield volcano that covers more than 75% of the island of Maui, Hawaii. The AVA covers approximately 70 acres (0.11 sq mi) with approximately 16 acres (6.5 ha) of vineyards making it the nation's smallest appellation. Although there is no winery within its boundary, grapes are processed at the Maui Wines facility, which is a short distance south of the AVA. According to the petition, the distinguishing features of the Ulupalakua AVA include its topography, soils, and climate.

== History ==
The term "Ulupalakua" (/ˌuːluːpɑːlɑːˈkuːə/ OO-loo-pah-lah-KOO-ah) translates from the Hawaiian language as "breadfruit ripened on the back." Local folklore tells how an ancient Maui chief would request breadfruit, his favorite, be picked on the far eastern side of Maui and brought to his home on the western side of the island. The harvesters would gather unripe fruit, which would ripen by the time they had reached the area that came to be called "Ulupalakua." Although there is a town several miles south of the AVA called Ulupalakua, the petition provided evidence that the name "Ulupalakua" applies to a region larger than just the town. For example, the Ulupalakua AVA is located on the Ulupalakua Ranch, which was so named in 1922 to honor the land's history.
The Ulupalakua area has long been known as suitable for farming. Prior to the 1800s, early agricultural efforts by Hawaiians established fields for taro and sweet potato in the region. In the 1840s, the poi economy started to recede when King Kamehameha III and his advisers argued that an economy of commercial agriculture would be a stronger driver of the island's future. In 1845 Captain Lincoln L. Torbert, active member of the Royal Hawaiian Agricultural Society, leased land in Ulupalakua to produce beef, hogs, sheep, molasses, corn and Irish potatoes, primarily to supply island merchant ships and to ship to California to fuel that region's "gold rush" era and on direction from King Kamehameha III planted sugar cane. But sugar operations all over the islands faltered as land prices, taxes and competition grew, and in 1856, a retired whaling sea captain, James Makee, bought the Torbert Plantation and changed its name to Rose Ranch operating it for three decades. His approach to sugar was successful: For a decade his mill produced 800 or more pounds (360+ kg) of sugar per year on 1,000 acres (400 ha). This early entrepreneur even planted cotton to take advantage of the Union blockade of southern ports during the Civil War. Makee had further broad ideas. Capitalizing on lovely views, he planted exotic gardens, built cottages, and started what was perhaps Hawaii's first agritourism project - a festive retreat that became popular with royalty from the islands and visitors from around the world. The ranch's next owner, James Isaac Dowsett, who held the property from 1886 to 1900, improved the cattle herd by bringing Aberdeen Angus stock to the islands. Dowsett sold to Dr. James M. Raymond, who in 1922 sold to Frank Baldwin, the grandson of Maui's first Christian missionaries. Baldwin renamed the place Ulupalakua Ranch. Today's operation began in 1963 when C. Pardee Erdman bought from the Baldwins. The Erdman family revived Makee's enterprising spirit, but in a different direction, developing the property into a favorite destination for both travelers and locals.

Viticulture in Hawaii and on Maui has roots back into the early 1800s when with "... cuttings from plants brought to Oahu by Spanish horticulturist, Don Francisco de Paula Marin, Portuguese settlers with a sense of adventure and an obvious love of the fermented grape, established small vineyards and wineries on Maui and Hawaii...". Marin established Hawaii's first grape vineyard in 1815, and produced wine with a small crop quoted to have produced 38 US gal (140 L; 32 imp gal) and an increase to 1,330 US gal (5,000 L; 1,110 imp gal) in 1826. Pre-Prohibition wineries were established and reference the use of grapes grown on Maui. One winery continued production in Hawaii on the island of Maui into the post-Prohibition era, but when the price of beef increased, the vineyards were pulled out for the use of grazing lands. It was until the 1970s, interest was resumed as Emil Tedeschi and the new owners of the Ulupalakua Ranch, the Erdman's, decided to plant vineyards with the assistance from UC Davis Department of Viticulture and Enology where over 150 varieties were examined with experiments and several years of research. Graham Hornel Pata declared "(t)here's a little bit of Australia, of India and of California up there on the southwest slopes of Maui's magical mountain, the Haleakala volcano...". Emil Tedeschi quoted "the similarities between Napa and Ulupalakua. Both have a hot spell and a coolness every day...We're protected by the mountains, don't have mildew problems...the soil drainage is good, and the soil itself is the volcanic type."

== Terroir ==
=== Topography ===
The Ulupalakua AVA contains a series of four distinct benches that are oriented to the southwest. The benches are gently sloped, with slope angles between 0 and 5 percent, and are separated by more steeply sloped erosional ravines. The petition states that the gentle slopes of the benches minimize the risk of erosion and facilitate safe agriculture. The open, less steep terrain also allows vineyards planted on the benches to receive uniform amounts of sunlight, rainfall, and temperature-moderating cloud cover. The AVA is surrounded in each direction by more steeply sloped, mountainous terrain. To the west and east of the AVA, the slope angles average 17 percent. To the north and south of the AVA, slope angles average about 15 percent. The regions to the north and west also contain more erosional features, such as ravines, that are less suited for viticulture than the benches of the AVA. The region to the south of the AVA features another ravine composed of rugged exposed volcanic rocks, which are not well-suited for viticulture.

=== Climate ===
The petition states that although most people would consider Hawaii to be hot, the Ulupalakua AVA is cool because of its elevation and proximity to the 10,000-foot (3,000 m) Mt. Haleakala. The AVA sits on the western slopes of the volcano at elevations between 1,560 and 1,850 ft (480–560 m) above sea level. The petition states that temperatures in Maui typically drop 3.5 F (1.9 C) for every 1,000 ft (300 m) of elevation gained. A 2003 article about Maui Wines notes that "mornings and late afternoons tend to be cool at these elevations...." The petition provided information on the average monthly high and low temperatures, as well as the monthly highest and lowest recorded temperatures for the AVA and the region to the north. Temperature data was not provided for the regions to the east, west, or south. The data shows that the Ulupalakua AVA has generally mild temperatures, with a 20 F (11.1 C) or less difference between the average high and average low temperatures for any given month. The average monthly low temperatures and lowest recorded monthly temperatures within the AVA do not drop below 50 °F (10 °C), which is generally considered to be the minimum temperature required for vine growth and fruit development. By contrast, Kēōkea which is located to the north of the AVA and at higher elevations, recorded substantially lower temperatures than the AVA for each category, including temperatures below 50 °F (10 °C). According to the petition, the lack of extremes in temperatures within the AVA protect ripening fruit against sunburn and heat stress.
The petition also included information on the average monthly precipitation amounts for the Ulupalakua AVA and the regions to the east and west. Precipitation amounts were not provided for the regions to the south and north. The Ulupalakua AVA receives substantially more precipitation than the region to the west and less than the region to the east. The differences in rainfall are due to the orographic effects of Mt. Haleakala. As the moist air moves from east to west over the mountain, locations at higher elevations, such as Polipoli Springs, receive more rainfall than regions at lower elevations, such as Makena Bay on the coast. Ulupalakua, which is located at elevations higher than Makena Bay and lower than Polipoli Springs, receives almost twice as much annual rainfall as the lower location and over half as much as the higher location. The petition states that the lower rainfall amounts within the AVA, particularly during the harvest season of June through August, reduce the risk of mildew and rot.

=== Soils ===
Soils within the Ulupalakua AVA formed from the erosion of ancient alkali lava flows from Mt. Haleakala. The most prominent soil within the AVA is Kula loam, which makes up 80 percent of the soil. Kula loam is derived from weathered basic igneous rock and is well-drained and moderately rapid in permeability. The top soil is typically 8 inches (20 cm) deep, with subsoils reaching around four feet (1.2 m) before hitting bedrock of andesite and basalt. The remaining 20 percent of the soil is composed of the IO series. Soils of this series are silt loams that gradually acquire more clay deeper in the soil. The top soil is about 10 inches (25 cm), and subsoils reach basalt and andesite bedrock at around four feet (1.2 m). The petition states that the soils of the AVA are fertile enough to produce healthy vines and fruit without promoting excessive vine and leaf growth. Additionally, the uniformity of the soils within the AVA results in a greater consistency in growing conditions for vineyards than can be found in the surrounding regions. To the south of the Ulupalakua AVA, the soil changes to Kula very rocky loam. This soil consist of very large volcanic rocks and boulders which would not be suitable for vineyards. To the west is a continuation of the same Kula loam that is found in the AVA. However, the petition notes that the top soil in this region has been scoured by erosion and thus would be thinner and not as suitable for viticulture as the Kula loam soils of the AVA. The petition did not provide information on the soils to the north and east of the AVA.
