= Seiad Valley AVA =

Appellation that designates wine in Siskiyou County, California

Coordinates: 41°51′18″N 123°12′09″W

Seiad Valley
- Wine region
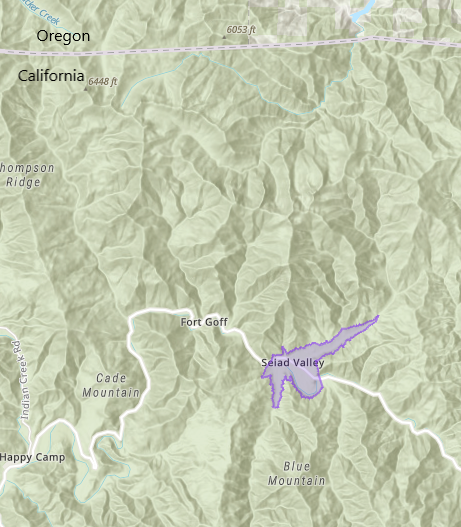
- Type: American Viticultural Area
- Year established: 1994
- Country: United States
- Part of: California, Siskiyou County
- Soil conditions: Deep fertile soil mixtures of loam, sand, clay and eroded rocks
- Total area: 2,160 acres (3.38 sq mi)
- Size of planted vineyards: 2.5 acres (1 ha)
- No. of vineyards: 0
- Grapes produced: Riesling
- No. of wineries: 0

Seiad Valley is an American Viticultural Area (AVA) within Siskiyou County located in northwestern California, adjacent to the Klamath River about 15 miles (24 km) south of Oregon border. It was established as the nation's 125^{th}, the state's 73^{rd} and the county's initial appellation on May 19, 1994 by the Bureau of Alcohol, Tobacco and Firearms (ATF), Treasury after reviewing the petition submitted by Brian J. Helsaple of Seiad Valley Vineyards proposing a viticultural area in Siskiyou County known as "Seiad Valley." The viticultural area encompassed approximately 2,160 acres (3.38 sq mi) cultivating 2.5 acres (1.0 ha) under vine. Seiad Valley Vineyards was the only commercial grower and the only wine producer active within the appellation. Seiad Valley Vineyards has since ceased business operations and the appellation currently exists only on paper with the TTB.

== History ==
The name "Seiad" (//siˈɛd// SAY-ad) was originally spelled "Sciad", and the creek and valley were called that by the trappers "before the prospectors came in 1850." Sometime after 1871, the spelling of the name changed to "Seiad." In "Gold Mining from Scott Bar to Happy Camp," by J.B. Grider, the following description appears:

Seiad is a small valley two miles long and one mile wide * * *.There are two large creeks in Seiad, Grider Creek and Seiad Creek. Grider Creek flows north into the Klamath from the Marble Mountain territory. Seiad creek flows south into the Klamath from the Siskiyous and Red Mountain.

The petitioner also provided a copy of a claim document dated August 26, 1942, which states the Grider Creek mining claim is "situate in the Seiad Mining District."

== Terroir ==
The viticultural area consists of the valleys drained by Seiad Creek and Grider Creek, which both flow into the Klamath River in northwestern California. These valleys and an expanse of land along the Klamath River which connects them share characteristics of topography, soil composition and climate which distinguish the viticultural area from the surrounding areas.

=== Topography ===
The appellation is a relatively flat area varying in elevation from 1,400 to 1,600 feet (430–490 m), with a small portion as high as 1,800 ft (550 m), surrounded by steeply rising terrain. Outside the area, the elevation ranges from 2,000 to 2,800 feet (610–850 m), with peaks exceeding 3,000 feet (910 m) on all sides, and some peaks as high as 3,900 feet (1,200 m). Snow melt, runoff, and erosion from these higher areas into the valley create a contrast in both the quality of soils and the availability of water within and outside the area. The lower elevation within the area also contributes to more moderate temperatures there.

=== Climate ===
An article in the Pioneer Press of September 16, 1992, titled Rock-pile grapevines surprising all experts, contrasted Siskiyou County growing conditions with those in Seiad Valley vineyard: "What's stopped the area from becoming a wine-producing area are the erratic late spring freezes in the zone where elevations are low enough to even make it possible. And in some of the county's lowest elevation areas, the precipitation levels are too high." The article stated the rock tailings in the vineyard "may give Helsaple just the edge he needs to be the county's first successful long term wine grape grower." The plant hardiness zone is 8b.

=== Soil ===
The valley floor is "composed of deep fertile soil mixtures of loam, sand, clay and rocks eroded from the surrounding mountain slopes." It is "mostly alluvium deposits which were widely dredged and hydraulically mined for gold. Chromite was also mined within the Seiad Valley area." Dredging left "tailings," or piles of rounded rocks, wherever the dredge operated. The petitioner states that these granite-dominated rock tailings store heat during the day and provide protection against frost in spring and fall. The exposed rocks absorb and retain heat from the sun, moderating the effects of a cool, mountain valley climate.

== See also ==
- California wine
