= Manton Valley AVA =

Appellation that designates wine in Shasta County, California

Coordinates: 40°25′40″N 121°50′15″W

Manton Valley
- Wine region
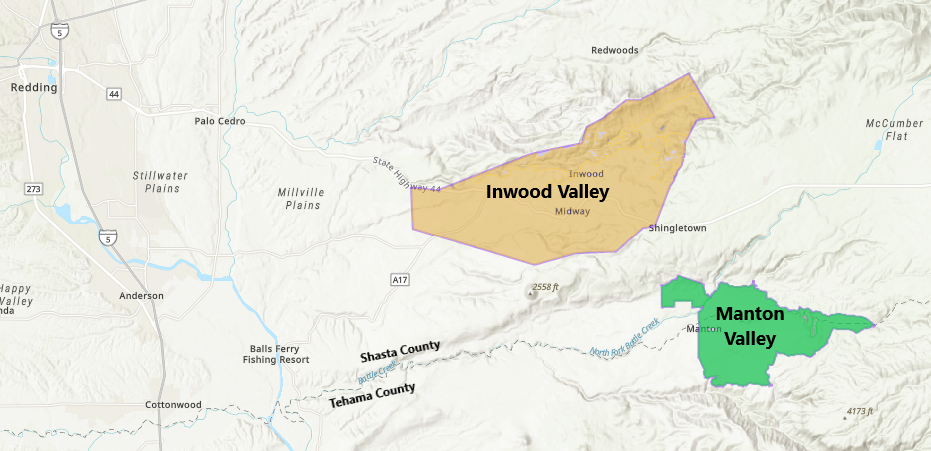
- Type: American Viticultural Area
- Year established: 2014
- Years of wine industry: 176
- Country: United States
- Part of: California, Shasta County, Tehama County
- Growing season: 78 days
- Climate region: Region III
- Heat units: 3,428 GDD units
- Precipitation (annual average): 33.65 in (854.71 mm)
- Soil conditions: Cohasset gravelly loams, Forward and Manton sandy loam
- Total area: 11,178 acres (17 sq mi)
- Size of planted vineyards: 200 acres (81 ha)
- No. of vineyards: 11
- Grapes produced: Cabernet Sauvignon, Chardonnay, Gewurztraminer, Merlot, Petite Sirah, Pinot Noir, Sauvignon Blanc, Syrah/Shiraz, Tempranillo / Valdepenas, Viognier, Zinfandel
- No. of wineries: 6

Manton Valley is an American Viticultural Area (AVA) spanning across Shasta and Tehama Counties, in north-central California. It was established as the nation's 215^{th}, the state's 131^{st}, Shasta's second and Tehama County's initial appellation on July 31, 2014 by the Alcohol and Tobacco Tax and Trade Bureau (TTB), Treasury after reviewing the petition submitted by Mark Livingston, of Cedar Crest Vineyards, on behalf of Cedar Crest Vineyards and other vineyard and winery owners in Manton, California, proposing the 11,178-acre (17 sq mi) viticultural area named "Manton Valley."
Manton Valley is the landform located between the north and south forks of Battle Creek in Shasta and Tehama counties. The appellation derives its name from the township of Manton which is located within the viticultural area and appears on the USGS maps included with the petition. The petitioner chose to add the word "valley" to the name of the large valley where the appellation and the town of Manton lie, and Manton Road winds through the AVA. The viticultural area is a stream-cut valley with a flat-to-gently-rolling floor and slope angles ranging from 0 to 30 percent and elevations between 2,000 and 3,500 ft (610–1,070 m). The distinguishing features of the Manton Valley AVA are its topography, climate, and soils.

== History ==
Among the great names in California's history connected with this area are Peter Lassen, Gen. John Sutter, Leland Stanford, and the Trappist Order of the Roman Catholic Church. F.T. Robson wrote, "In the Spring of 1843, Peter Lassen was sent by Gen. John Sutter northward through the Sacramento Valley in pursuit of strayed or stolen livestock," Mr. Robson begins his review of the Stanford-Vina Ranch which was located approximately 25 mi (40 km) to the southwest of Manton.

The beautiful countryside so appealed to him that upon his return Lassen applied for and received as a grant five Spanish leagues (22,500 acres (35.2 sq mi)) along the Sacramento River from Deer Creek southward, in what is now Tehama and Butte Counties. Part of this site eventually became the headquarters of the Stanford-Vina Ranch. Instead of grapes, Lassen planted wheat and cotton on his Bosquejo Rancho crops and left only two acres for the crop, for which the land later became noted. Pack mules brought the first vines from Los Angeles. It was here, according to Robson's story, that Lassen often entertained Frémont during the days when discussions leading to the formation of the Bear Flag Republic were held under the rancho's "Council Oak."
Finally, so the story develops, Lassen lost the ranch. Part of it was acquired in 1852 by Henry Gehrke, a German immigrant, who held a mortgage on the entire grant. It was on this land that Gehrke planted 75 acres of grapes, and from these he produced claret, angelica, sherry, Riesling, muscatel, and brandy. But Gehrke did not complete the major development of the vineyard. In 1881 it was bought by former Gov. Leland Stanford, who first saw the land when he was inspecting the railroad that was being built to Oregon. Mr. Robson writes: "With Lassen's original holdings as a nucleus, Stanford busily added adjacent lands until he owned more than 60,000 acres (94 sq mi). To this newly named Vina Ranch Stanford attracted many French families, employed during his visit to Europe, and to it he sent grapevines or cuttings from French vineyards, until in time he had nearly 3,000,000 vines on the 3,570 irrigated acres (1,440 ha) whose long alleys were lined with fruit trees. Here he raised some 14 varieties of grapes from which the large Vina Winery in 1883 made 100,000 US gal (380,000 L) of port, claret, white wines and brandy." The history of the Stanford winery also disclosed the fact that at one time about a quarter of this liquor distilled in the state came from Vina, to be shipped to all parts of the globe. But, Stanford was never able to reproduce the fine mild table wines of France. The soil and the water is probably responsible for this failure, the richly fertile soil of the Sacramento Valley, its hot sun, the elaborate irrigation system combined to produce a grape containing far more sugar or alcohol than its French ancestors had. All these difficulties notwithstanding, the winery continued in production long after the death of Leland Stanford, the founder, with Mrs. Stanford, of Stanford University. The property passed into the hands of the trustees of Stanford, like the majority of his estate. On July 24, 1915, the central building of the ranch, the Vina Winery itself, burned to the ground, and the trustees were faced with the problem of whether they should remain in the wine business. "Finally the high cost of labor, and materials, during the World War, the criticism of prohibitionists and others that a university should not be run on money from the sale of alcoholic beverages, and the lack of profit from the sale of grape juice led the trustees to decide against rebuilding the winery."

During the 1920s, the property was sold in several parcels, and its many buildings, including two acres of wine cellars with thick brick walls, have since been used in various ways. But on July 1, 1955, the original Bosquejo Rancho of Peter Lassen passed into new hands. The land became the property of the Trappist order, who made it a farm and a place of seclusion in keeping with the Trappists' ages-old monastic tradition.

== Terroir ==
=== Topography ===
Manton Valley AVA lies entirely within a stream-cut valley bordered by the two main forks of Battle Creek. Within the western portion of the AVA, the land is relatively flat. Heading eastward across the AVA, the land becomes progressively hillier. The northern and southern sides of the valley are marked by vertical canyons, where the forks of Battle Creek have carved deeply into the land. Slope angles within the AVA range between 0 and 30 percent, according to the USDA soil survey maps included with the petition. The slope angles are shallow enough to reduce soil erosion risk and allow for grape cultivation. The USGS maps show the average elevations within the AVA range from approximately 2,000 ft (610 m) to approximately 3,500 ft (1,100 m). According to the petition, the elevations within the AVA provide vineyards with cooler temperatures than the lower elevations to the south and west of the AVA. Additionally, vineyards within the AVA are less susceptible to damaging frosts or snows than the mountains found in the higher elevations to the north and east. The AVA also has numerous spring-fed streams, which supply water to irrigation canals, irrigation ponds, and small lakes, providing a reliable, year-round source of irrigation water for vineyards. The streams also transport nutrients and minerals from eroded soils into the irrigation canals and ponds and, eventually, into the vineyards. The steeper, higher terrain of the Shingletown Ridge is north of the AVA. Elevations in this region range from approximately 2,400 to 3,800 ft (730–1,160 m). According to the USDA soil survey maps, slopes in this region range between 30 and 50 percent. Due to their steepness, the slopes are generally not suitable for viticulture, and the elevations make the ridge prone to frost and heavy snow. To the east of the AVA, the terrain becomes steeper and higher. Slope angles in the region immediately to the east of the AVA range from 30 to 65 percent. Elevations and steepness continue to increase farther to the east within [[Lassen Volcanic National Park]], approximately 25 mi (40 km) from the AVA. Mount Lassen, the highest peak within the park, has an elevation of 10,457 ft (3,187 m). At night during the summer, cool mountain air flows down the mountains of the park, providing overnight cooling to the lower elevations outside the park, including the Manton Valley AVA.
The region to the immediate south of the AVA has lower elevations than the AVA. Along the South Fork of Battle Creek, elevations range between 1,200 and 1,600 ft (370 and 490 m). Although the elevations are lower than within the AVA, the slope angles in this region are steeper than the relatively gentle rolling valley of the proposed AVA, ranging between 30 and 50 percent, as shown on the USDA soil survey map. To the immediate west of the Manton Valley AVA are large plateaus and elevations that are generally lower than those found within the AVA. The USGS maps show elevations ranging from approximately 1,000 to 1,900 ft (300–580 m). Slope angles in this region are similar to those within the AVA.

=== Climate ===
The climate of the Manton Valley AVA differs from that of the surrounding region in terms of growing degree days, diurnal temperature differential, and precipitation. Each of these climatic aspects has an effect on viticulture within the AVA. The petition included information on growing degree days (GDDs) 1 based on temperature readings for the period between April 1 and October 31 gathered from locations both within and outside of the AVA. The data from Alger Vineyards, which is within the AVA, was collected from 2002 to 2011. The data from the Black Butte weather station, to the north of the AVA, is from the period between 2008 and 2011. The data from the weather stations in Manzanita Lake, to the east, from Chico, to the south, and from Redding and Red Bluff to the west, was all collected between 2002 and 2011. The table below summarizes the data. The table shows that the Manton Valley AVA accumulates significantly more GDDs than the cooler region to the east and fewer GDDs than the very warm regions to the south and west. Although the region to the north has a similar accumulation of GDDs, the petition notes that temperatures to the north of the AVA reach 50 °F (10 °C) earlier in the growing season and do not drop as low at night, allowing the GDDs to accumulate at a faster rate than within the AVA. A faster rate of GDD accumulation enables growers in the vicinity of Black Butte to harvest their grapes several weeks earlier than growers in the Manton Valley AVA. The GDD accumulation of Manton Valley AVA places it in the moderately warm Region III category, allowing growers to plant warmer varieties of grapes, such as Merlot, Cabernet Sauvignon, Zinfandel, and Viognier. As previously noted, the rate at which GDDs accumulate also plays a role in when grapes are ripe enough to harvest. The Manton Valley AVA also experiences a greater temperature difference between daytime highs and nighttime lows (diurnal temperature differential) than the surrounding regions. The petition states that this greater diurnal temperature differential is due to the nighttime cold air drainage that flows from the high ridges of Lassen Peak, to the east of the AVA, and from the slopes of [Shingletown Ridge, to the north, into the lower elevations of the AVA, providing overnight cooling to the vineyards in the Manton Valley AVA. The table below summarizes the July temperature differentials for the AVA and the surrounding regions. July was chosen because that month is the peak of the growing season. The large drop in temperature at night within the AVA delays fruit maturation and extends the growing season. The petition states that harvest within the AVA begins in very late September or October and often continues until early December. By contrast, most growers in the surrounding regions begin harvesting in late August and early September. The petition also states that the delayed maturation brought about by cooler nighttime temperatures allows the grapes to maintain a desirable balance of sugars, pH, and acid. Grapes within the AVA are generally harvested with sugar levels between 23 and 26 brix units, a pH between 3.3 and 3.6, and total acid between 0.6 and 0.8 percent. By contrast, fruit from warmer regions to the west of the AVA reaches full ripeness sooner and typically has lower acid levels, higher pH levels, and higher amounts of sugar, factors which must be compensated for during the winemaking process. The precipitation within the Manton Valley AVA also differentiates it from the surrounding regions. The following table shows the average monthly and annual precipitation amounts for the AVA and adjacent regions. Data was collected from weather stations from 2002 to 2011. The data in the table show that the Manton Valley AVA has higher annual precipitation levels than the region to the west and lower levels than the regions to the north and east. Although low precipitation amounts during the summer months ordinarily would pose a problem for viticulture, growers within the AVA are not entirely dependent on rainfall due to the area's numerous spring-fed creeks and streams that supply water to irrigation ponds and canals. The petition also states that the end of the growing season in the AVA is relatively dry, with low humidity levels during the late summer and autumn and low precipitation amounts. The low rainfall levels and low humidity reduce the risk of mildew and rot caused by wet growing conditions, particularly late in the growing season. As a result, growers in the proposed AVA are able to allow their fruit to stay on the vine longer, giving the fruit time to mature slowly and achieve the desired sugar, acid, and pH levels. The petition notes that although Red Bluff has significantly less rainfall than the proposed AVA, the town's location on the Sacramento River leads to an increase in relative humidity, so grapes cannot stay on the vine as long as grapes within the AVA without risking mildew or rot.

=== Soil ===
Twenty-eight differing volcanic soils dominate the region. Most of the soil within Manton Valley AVA has volcanic origins and is composed of material from weathered volcanic rock, rhyolite, or volcanic ash. The primary geologic formation beneath the AVA is known as the Tuscan Formation, which was formed from basalt, basaltic andesite, and mudflows from volcanic eruptions. Erosion of the Tuscan Formation has contributed to the formation of many of the soils within the AVA, such as Cohasset gravelly loams, Forward sandy loams, and Manton sandy loams. These three soils constitute approximately 73 percent of the soils found in the Manton Valley AVA. The three soils are described as well-drained, a characteristic that aids in preventing mildew and rot in the vines. These soils also are generally shallow and nutrient-poor. Leaf canopies do not become overly thick and excessively shady in nutrient-poor soils, so the grape clusters are exposed to more sunlight and ripen more quickly than fruit that is shaded by the excessive canopy growth that nutrient-rich soils can promote. Vineyards planted in nutrient-poor soils also yield fewer grapes than vineyards planted in more fertile soil. According to the petition, the vineyards within the proposed AVA average approximately three tons of grapes per acre, compared to a typical yield of 15 tons per acre from the more fertile soils of the Sacramento Valley, farther to the west and southwest.

Windy and McCarthy stony loams dominate the soils north of the AVA. These series are generally associated with conifer forests and elevations higher than those found within the AVA. The soils to the east of the Manton Valley AVA are primarily Sheld series soils, which occur on steep slopes. The petition notes that the shallowness, erosion potential, and excessive stoniness of the soils in this region categorize them as Class 7 soils under the Natural Resource Conservation Service land capability classification system, meaning they are generally unsuitable for agricultural purposes due to one or more deficiencies that cannot be overcome. As a result, most of the land in the region to the east of the AVA is used for grazing livestock or as wildlife habitat. Slightly south of the AVA, near Paynes Creek, the soils are primarily Supan and Toomes series loams. Due to their rocky nature, these soils are also classified as Class 7 soils. Small pockets of alluvial soils that do support a few small vineyards are found along Paynes Creek and the South Fork of Battle Creek; but these small vineyards are the exception, and most of the soils south of the AVA are used for grazing cattle.

The soils to the immediate west of the AVA are almost entirely of the Guenoc and Toomes series. These soils are very rocky, filled with boulders, and nutrient deficient. They are generally used for grazing livestock rather than agriculture. Farther to the west is the Sacramento River Valley, which has its northernmost end near the towns of Redding and Red Bluff, approximately 30 to 35 mi (48–56 km) from the AVA. The soils in the Sacramento River Valley are derived primarily from deep quaternary sediments. These soils are nutrient-rich, allowing vineyards to produce much larger harvests than vineyards within the AVA.

== Viticulture ==
Viticulture was present in the region as Leland Stanford had established his vineyards in Tehama County in the mid-1800's around Vina, while choosing to build his university in the San Francisco Bay Area. Vina was the largest vineyard in North America in its day. Those vineyards are now gone, some small blocks certainly exist. It was not until 1971 when the Dobson Vineyard cultivated its 95 acres (38 ha) fields with Chardonnay, Syrah and Viognier that revived the local industry into modern day presence. Jerry Dobson in the beginning processed their Chardonnay at the Fezter winery in Hopland. The vineyard floors in Manton Valley are very red revealing their volcanic origins. The majority of vineyards and wineries in the AVA creates a "wine trail" along Forward Road featuring Alger Vineyards, Cedar Crest Vineyards, Indian Peak Vineyards, Shasta Daisy Vineyards, Ringtail Vineyards and Mt Tehama Vineyards with some featuring tasting rooms. The recognition of the Manton Valley appellation allowed vintners to highlight the region's unique soil qualities and the minerality that affects the grapes and vintages.
