= Yucaipa Valley AVA =

American Viticultural Area in California

Coordinates: 34°44′51″N 117°01′48″W

Yucaipa Valley
- Wine region
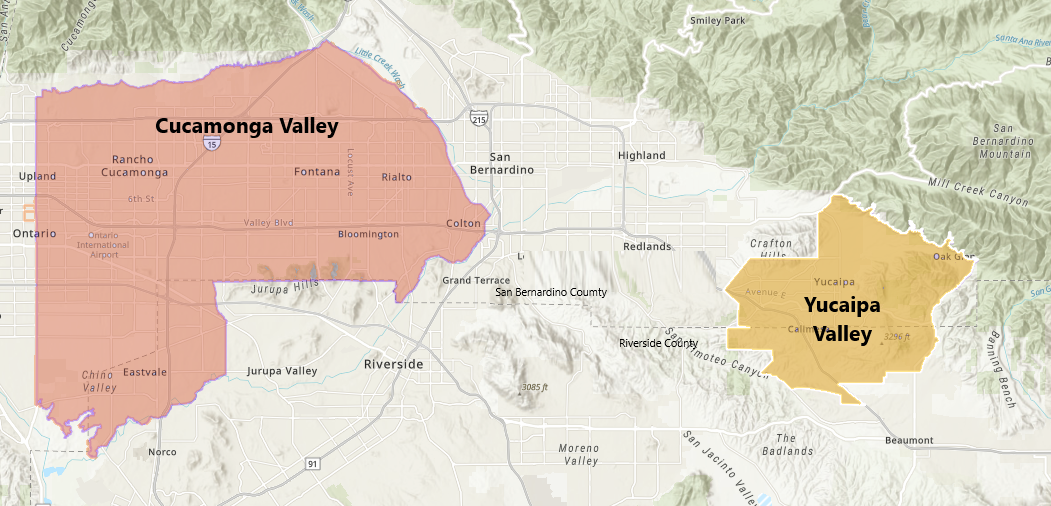
- Type: American Viticultural Area
- Year established: 2024
- Years of wine industry: 136
- Country: United States
- Part of: California, Riverside County, San Bernardino County
- Other regions in California, Riverside County, San Bernardino County: Cucamonga Valley AVA
- Climate region: Region I-IV
- Precipitation (annual average): 14.41–15.35 inches (366–390 mm) snow: one inch (25 mm)
- Soil conditions: Rich in clays, adobe, and loamy clay with high amounts of calcium
- Total area: 36,467 acres (57 sq mi)
- Size of planted vineyards: approx 15 acres (6.1 ha)
- No. of vineyards: 23
- Grapes produced: Barbera, Cabernet Franc, Cabernet Sauvignon, Chardonnay, Malbec, Merlot, Nebbiolo, Petite Sirah, Sangiovese, Syrah and Zinfandel
- No. of wineries: 2

Yucaipa Valley is an American Viticultural Area (AVA) located in the valley within the foothills of the San Bernardino Mountains in Riverside and San Bernardino Counties. It was established as the nation's 272^{nd}, the state's 152^{nd} and Riverside County's fourth appellation on April 25, 2024, by the Alcohol and Tobacco Tax and Trade Bureau (TTB), Treasury after reviewing the petition submitted by the Yucaipa Valley Wine Alliance proposing the viticultural area known as "Yucaipa Valley." The viticultural area encompasses 36,467 acres (57 sq mi) and consists of the incorporated towns of Yucaipa, Calimesa, unincorporated areas of Oak Glen as well as surrounding county areas defined by natural borders. The distinguishing features of the Yucaipa Valley AVA include its elevation and climate.

== History ==
This geographic region can be recognized as far back as the late 1700s, and early 1800s. "Yucaipa" (/juːˈkaɪpə/ yoo-ke-ipuh) is thought to have meant "wetlands" owing to its well endowed water sources from the San Bernardino Mountains. The region was known as the "Yucaipa Valley" long before the town's incorporation in 1989. During the 1800s, the Yucaipa Valley was used as grazing land for a satellite property of Mission San Gabriel Arcángel's San Bernardino Rancho. For the next 100 years, the Yucaipa Valley became known for its agriculture and ranching enterprises. Yucaipa lands were transferred from the missions to Antonio Maria Lugo in 1842, and later to Diego Sepulveda. Sepulveda built the Rancho Yucaipa (Sepulveda Ranch), which stands today as California Historical Landmark 528. Vestiges of this ranching history are still visible around the area.
Shortly following California statehood in 1850, settlers began to migrate to the Yucaipa Valley. John Dunlap settled on the Sepulveda Ranch, which became known as "Dunlap Acres." In 1869, Dunlap expanded agricultural operations to include grain on the lower benches and fruit, mainly apples and cherries, higher up on the North Bench and Oak Glen, happened during the early settlement days of the valley. The Dunlaps also built Casa Blanca in 1882 and the first school on Cherrycroft Drive, now restored under private ownership. Ranches were also established in Wildwood Canyon, the North Bench area, and Live Oak Canyon. The only other early industry in the Yucaipa Valley to generate as much excitement was gold mining, which had a short-lived success due to mining in the Crafton Hills.

The Yucaipa Valley has a rich history of cultivation, ranging from peaches, plums, walnuts, and most notably apples. The early 1900s saw changes in Yucaipa Valley's agriculture, from large-scale ranching to apple orchards. From 1900 to 1910, the Redlands-Yucaipa Land Company bought 11,000 acres (4,500 ha) in Yucaipa, and soon thereafter, developers began to sell ranches to make way for a burgeoning apple industry. For several decades, apple production became a staple for the local economy, and the goal was to create the "apple kingdom" of the Southwest. As people migrated to Yucaipa in search of wealth, a town center began to form at the corner of Yucaipa Boulevard and California Street. It was one of the fruit baskets of Southern California for the first half of the 20th century, and known to have a near perfect agricultural climate.

Grape cultivation in the Yucaipa Valley can be traced as far back as the late 19th century, and early 20th century. Several prominent ranches in Yucaipa, including the well known Dunlap Ranch, had vineyards adjacent to their farmlands as early as the late 19th century. Home-seeking ads in 1910 continued to champion the soils of Yucaipa, stating that "grapes, apricots, and olives are big producers" in the region. 'Horticultural Jottings' in the 1922 Pacific Rural Press recorded the Carter Brothers, Yucaipa fruitland owners, seeding 25 acres (10 ha) of grapes in the Yucaipa Valley and the cultivation of modest vineyards throughout the Yucaipa Valley continued up through the 1960s as a referenced in land for sale ads in 1966 publications. The cultivation of grapes in the Yucaipa Valley continued on a small scale up through the present day, until a growing movement of viticulturalists began vinifying the valley since the early 2000s at a rapid rate.

== Terroir ==
=== Topography ===
Yucaipa Valley AVA is a region of rolling hills in the foothills of the San Bernardino Mountains. The boundaries of the region known historically as the Yucaipa Valley are clearly delineated by the Yucaipa Valley Historical Society to mean the boundaries of Yucaipa, Oak Glen, and Calimesa. The AVA includes the incorporated municipalities of Yucaipa and Calimesa and unincorporated areas of Oak Glen, as well as surrounding county areas with natural borders. The northern boundary follows a series of section lines on the USGS maps, as well as elevation contours, to separate the AVA from the steeper slopes of the Yucaipa Ridge mountain range. The eastern boundary largely follows Little San Gorgonio Creek to separate the AVA from regions that traditionally have not been associated with the region known as the "Yucaipa Valley." The southern boundary follows a series of roads to separate the AVA from the towns of Cherry Valley and Beaumont, while the western boundary generally follows land tract boundaries.

Elevations within the Yucaipa Valley AVA range from 2,000 to 4,600 feet (610–1,400 m). The high elevations affect viticulture as sunlight becomes more concentrated. As a result, grapes receive a "tan," which results in thicker skin than the same varietals grown at lower elevations would have. The thick skins contribute to the color and tannin levels of the resulting wine and protect developing grapes from the dramatic climate shifts that can occur in high altitude vineyards. To the immediate north and northeast of the AVA is the mountain range known as the Yucaipa Ridge, which has steep slopes that generate elevations up to 2,000 feet (610 m) higher than the northern boundary of the AVA at each point. The region east of the AVA has elevations similar to those within the AVA. However, the petition states that the region to the east is not included in the AVA because it is largely uninhabited and undeveloped, has few roads, and does not have historical ties to the region known as the Yucaipa Valley. Furthermore, according to the USGS maps included in the petition, the region to the east of the AVA is largely covered by the [[San Bernardino National Forest]], which is not available for commercial viticulture due to its status as a National Forest. Cherry Valley and Beaumont to the south and southeast have elevations similar to those in the lower portions of the AVA. To the south and southwest of the AVA, in San Timoteo Canyon, elevations are lower, ranging from 1,600 to 2,000 feet (490–610 m). To the west of the AVA is the Redlands Valley, which also has lower elevations ranging from 1,100 to 2,000 feet (340–610 m).

=== Climate ===
According to the petition, Yucaipa Valley AVA has a hot, dry climate suitable for growing grape varietals such as Cabernet Sauvignon, Merlot, Zinfandel, Syrah, Malbec, Nebbiolo, Barbera, and Petite Sirah. The petition included information on the average monthly high, average monthly low, monthly record high, and monthly record low temperatures from the city of Yucaipa, as well as from the region to the west and the region to the north-northeast of the AVA. Within the city of Yucaipa, the average high temperature is 78.3 °F (25.7 °C), and the average low temperature is 48.7 °F (9.3 °C). August is typically the warmest month, with an average high of 97 °F (36 °C), and December is typically the coolest month, with an average minimum temperature of 40 °F (4 °C). The record high temperature in the city of Yucaipa is 114 °F (46 °C), while the record low temperature is 11 °F (−12 °C). The city of Redlands, to the west of the AVA, has slightly higher average high and low temperatures than the AVA. The average high temperature is 79.6 °F (26.4 °C), and the average low temperature is 50.5 °F (10.3 °C). August is typically the warmest month in Redlands, with an average high of 96 °F (36 °C), and December is typically the coolest month, with an average minimum temperature of 40 °F (4 °C). The record high temperature in Redlands is 118 °F (48 °C), and the record low temperature is 18 °F (−8 °C). To the north and northeast of the AVA, the community of Forest Falls is typically cooler than the AVA. The average high temperature is 61.5 °F (16.4 °C), and the average low temperature is 40.9 °F (4.9 °C). August is typically the warmest month, with an average high of 81 °F (27 °C). The record high temperature is 106 °F (41 °C), and the record low temperature is 5 °F (−15 °C).

The city of Yucaipa receives an average cumulative rainfall of 4.14 °F (−15.5 °C) during the growing season of April through October. The average precipitation amount for the city of Yucaipa during the winter months, November through March, is substantially greater, 15.35 inches (390 mm), with an average of 1 inch (25 mm) being snow. Accumulations of snow accrue at higher elevations within the AVA. According to the petition, the amount of snowfall and winter precipitation within the AVA affects viticulture, even though the vines are dormant. First, the snow helps ensure continued vine dormancy and provides a "necessary rest" from continual growth. The precipitation also creates hydric reserves that are beneficial during the hot, dry summer months. Finally, the snow protects vines against fungi and pests that hide within the bark when temperatures become colder. To the west of the AVA, the town of Redlands receives an average of 10.86 inches (276 mm) of winter precipitation. To the south of the AVA, the city of Beaumont receives an average winter precipitation amount very similar to that of the AVA. However, the petition states that because of the lower elevations, temperatures in Beaumont and Redlands seldom drop low enough for the precipitation to fall as snow. Although the region to the east of the AVA has a winter climate similar to that of the AVA, that region is outside of what has historically been called the Yucaipa Valley and is thus not included in the AVA. The USDA plant hardiness zone ranges from 8a to 10a.

=== Soil ===
Soil in the Yucaipa Valley has been classified as favorable to grape growing based on soil studies conducted by licensed and certified laboratories. Thanks to the gradual slopes within the Yucaipa Valley and proximity to the mountain range, the terroir created by the mountainous terrain is optimal for drainage. Soil drainage is designated as well drained to at points excessively drained. The soil in the Yucaipa Valley is generally classified as Sandy Loam in texture by the USDA with a favorable neutral pH rating; a type of soil that lends breathability to grapevines.

Drainage and breathability in soil is very important to viticulture. Vine roots need air to function, and soil lacking drainage can become waterlogged, slowly killing the roots of the vine. Waterlogging has also been tied to increased risk for disease, and decreases in soil nutrition and yields, underscoring the importance of the well drained soil in the Yucaipa Valley.

Nitrogen in Yucaipa soil has been rated optimal in the testing we have completed, as well as optimal magnesium and calcium. Each plays their important part in the farming of quality grapes. Excess nitrogen in soil can lead to the vines prioritizing shoot growth instead of grape maturation, and lack of nitrogen can prevent photosynthesis, and vine growth altogether. Lack of magnesium can create leaf yellowing of the vine leaves affecting the health of the canopy, and calcium deficiency makes the soil less likely to properly retain water in dry months.

== Viticulture ==
Yucaipa Valley itself has two currently licensed and fully bonded wineries in the region, Wildwood Oak Winery, founded by Anita Matlock, and Suveg Cellars, Yucaipa's first officially recognized bonded winery established in 2010 by Craig Suveg. Several viticulturists within the Yucaipa Valley plan to submit or intend to pursue licensing and bonding as their vines reach maturity. Vineyards in the AVA range from 20 to 2,000 plantings covering about 15 acres (6.1 ha).

The use of Yucaipa grapes, to their maximum permissible quantity, has already yielded international recognition for quality. Using under 15 Yucaipa grown Cabernet Sauvignon by volume and the remainder Lodi Cabernet Sauvignon, Suveg Cellars wine "Incorrigible" received a silver medal at the Los Angeles International Wine Competition in 2017, the first instance of Yucaipa Valley cultivated grape, in part, receiving international acclaim. Craig Suveg continues to harvest and incorporate his fruit into his wines. Suveg Cellars has gone on to win over 45 international medals for its wine as of this petition, and Wildwood Oak Winery just took home its first medals in international competition. Both wineries are attracting international attention to the Yucaipa Valley for their application of unique winemaking techniques and artisan quality wine production.

Yucaipa Valley AVA has the highest altitude vineyards in the California wine appellation, such as Shadow Mountain Vineyards at 3,500 feet (1,100 m), Santa Barbara Highlands Vineyard at 2,800–3,200 feet (850–980 m) and several other vineyards around the 2,700 feet (820 m) mark fall within the elevation ranges within the Yucaipa Valley AVA, and be about 1,000–1,500 feet (300–460 m) shy of the highest altitude points within its boundaries.
