= Manton, California =

Manton
- Unincorporated Community; Census Designated Place
- Location in Tehama County and the state of California

- Location in the United States
- Coordinates: 40°25′8″N 121°51′49″W
- Country: United States
- State: California
- County: Tehama

Area
  - Total: 17.722 sq mi (45.901 km^{2})
  - Land: 17.696 sq mi (45.833 km^{2})
  - Water: 0.026 sq mi (0.067 km^{2}) 0.15%
- Elevation: 2,008 ft (612 m)

Population (2020)
  - Total: 310
  - Density: 18/sq mi (6.8/km^{2})
- Time zone: UTC-8 (Pacific (PST))
  - Summer (DST): UTC-7 (PDT)
- ZIP code: 96059
- Area code: 530
- FIPS code: 06-45512
- GNIS feature ID: 1659048

Manton is a census-designated place (CDP) in Tehama County, California, United States. The population was 310 at the 2020 census, down from 347 at the 2010 census.

== History ==
A post office called Manton has been in operation since 1889. According to tradition, the town derives its name from "Man's Town" because a large share of the first settlers were males.

In August 2005, the town was overrun by a forest fire which destroyed several homes and forced the evacuation of the entire town. There were no injuries.

== Geography ==
Manton is located at 40°25′8″N 121°51′49″W (40.419020, -121.863519).

According to the United States Census Bureau, the CDP has a total area of 17.7 square miles (46 km^{2}), of which 99.85% is land and 0.15% is water.

=== Climate ===
This region experiences very hot and dry summers, with average monthly temperatures in July, August and September over 70 °F. According to the Köppen Climate Classification system, Manton has a warm-summer Mediterranean climate, abbreviated "Csb" on climate maps.

== Demographics ==
Historical population
Census	Pop.	Note	%±
2000	372		—
2010	347		−6.7%
2020	310		−10.7%
U.S. Decennial Census; 1860–1870 1880-1890; 1900 1910 1920; 1930 1940 1950; 1960 1970 1980; 1990 2000 2010

Manton first appeared as a census designated place in the 2000 U.S. census.

=== 2020 ===
The 2020 United States census reported that Manton had a population of 310. The population density was 17.5 inhabitants per square mile (6.8/km^{2}). The racial makeup of Manton was 276 (89.0%) White, 3 (1.0%) African American, 8 (2.6%) Native American, 4 (1.3%) Asian, 0 (0.0%) Pacific Islander, 7 (2.3%) from other races, and 12 (3.9%) from two or more races. Hispanic or Latino of any race were 12 persons (3.9%).

The census reported that 305 people (98.4% of the population) lived in households, 5 people (1.6%) lived in non-institutionalized group quarters, and no one was institutionalized.

There were 137 households, out of which 29 (21.2%) had children under the age of 18 living in them, 59 (43.1%) were married-couple households, 12 (8.8%) were cohabiting couple households, 26 (19.0%) had a female householder with no partner present, and 40 (29.2%) had a male householder with no partner present. 45 households (32.8%) were one person, and 34 (24.8%) were one person aged 65 or older. The average household size was 2.23. There were 84 families (61.3% of all households).

The age distribution was 62 people (20.0%) under the age of 18, 9 people (2.9%) aged 18 to 24, 58 people (18.7%) aged 25 to 44, 92 people (29.7%) aged 45 to 64, and 89 people (28.7%) who were 65 years of age or older. The median age was 53.8 years. For every 100 females, there were 109.5 males.

There were 171 housing units at an average density of 9.7 units per square mile (3.7 units/km^{2}), of which 137 (80.1%) were occupied. Of these, 106 (77.4%) were owner-occupied, and 31 (22.6%) were occupied by renters.

=== 2010 ===
The 2010 United States census reported that Manton had a population of 347. The population density was 19.6 inhabitants per square mile (7.6/km^{2}). The racial makeup of Manton was 312 (89.9%) White, 0 (0.0%) African American, 20 (5.8%) Native American, 1 (0.3%) Asian, 0 (0.0%) Pacific Islander, 7 (2.0%) from other races, and 7 (2.0%) from two or more races. Hispanic or Latino of any race were 35 persons (10.1%).

The Census reported that 331 people (95.4% of the population) lived in households, 16 (4.6%) lived in non-institutionalized group quarters, and 0 (0%) were institutionalized.

There were 146 households, out of which 29 (19.9%) had children under the age of 18 living in them, 90 (61.6%) were opposite-sex married couples living together, 8 (5.5%) had a female householder with no husband present, 6 (4.1%) had a male householder with no wife present. There were 5 (3.4%) unmarried opposite-sex partnerships, and 0 (0%) same-sex married couples or partnerships. 37 households (25.3%) were made up of individuals, and 20 (13.7%) had someone living alone who was 65 years of age or older. The average household size was 2.27. There were 104 families (71.2% of all households); the average family size was 2.67.

The population was spread out, with 51 people (14.7%) under the age of 18, 16 people (4.6%) aged 18 to 24, 52 people (15.0%) aged 25 to 44, 141 people (40.6%) aged 45 to 64, and 87 people (25.1%) who were 65 years of age or older. The median age was 53.9 years. For every 100 females, there were 110.3 males. For every 100 females age 18 and over, there were 120.9 males.

There were 180 housing units at an average density of 10.2 per square mile (3.9/km^{2}), of which 123 (84.2%) were owner-occupied, and 23 (15.8%) were occupied by renters. The homeowner vacancy rate was 0%; the rental vacancy rate was 7.4%. 277 people (79.8% of the population) lived in owner-occupied housing units and 54 people (15.6%) lived in rental housing units.

=== 2000 ===
The median income for a household in the CDP was $28,333, and the median income for a family was $34,375. Males had a median income of $30,000 versus $21,094 for females. The per capita income for the CDP was $19,127. About 9.4% of families and 18.1% of the population were below the poverty line, including 43.1% of those under age 18 and 8.2% of those age 65 or over.

== Government ==
In the California State Legislature, Manton is in the 1st senatorial district, represented by Republican Megan Dahle, and in the 3rd Assembly district, represented by Vacant.

In the United States House of Representatives, Manton is in California's 1st congressional district, represented by Republican James Gallagher.

== Utilities ==
The Volta powerhouses, currently owned by Pacific Gas and Electric Company, are located here.

== Religion ==
Monastery of St. John of Shanghai & San Francisco is located in Manton, under the Orthodox Church in America Diocese of the West. It was founded in 1996 by then-Fr. Jonah (Paffhausen). There are currently eight members of the community.
