= Volta powerhouses =

Power station in California

The Volta Powerhouses are hydroelectric generation plants located in southern Shasta County, California, between Shingletown and Manton. Volta Powerhouse I 40°27′33″N 121°51′56″W was built in 1901 by Keswick Electric Power Company; Volta Powerhouse II was built in 1980.
