= Winters Highlands AVA =

American Viticultural Area in California

Coordinates: 38°30′54″N 121°59′57″W

Winters Highlands
- Wine region
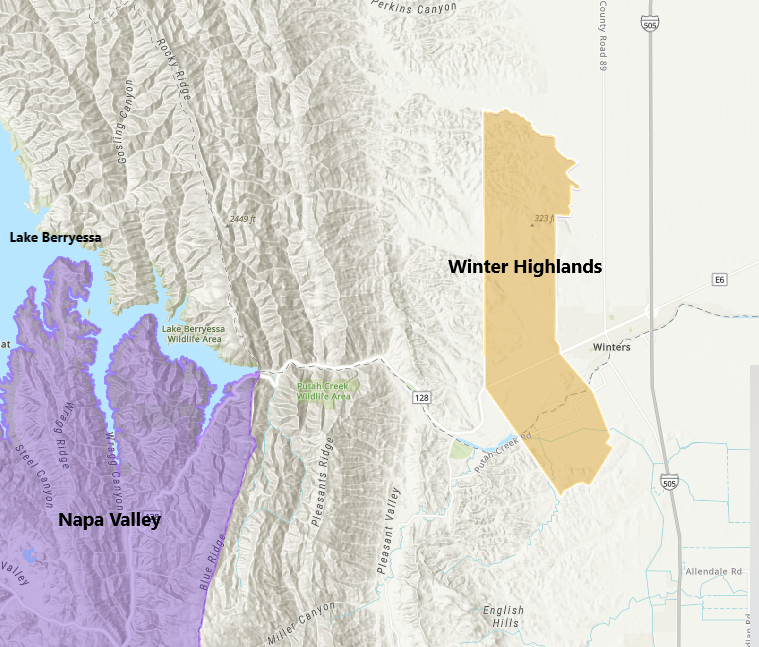
- Type: American Viticultural Area
- Year established: 2023
- Country: United States
- Part of: California, Solano County, Yolo County
- Growing season: 290 days
- Climate region: Region Ib
- Heat units: 2,347 GDD units
- Precipitation (annual average): 2 to 4 in (50–100 mm)
- Soil conditions: fine clay or loamy alfisols and inceptisols
- Total area: 7,296 acres (11.4 sq mi)
- Size of planted vineyards: 134 acres (54 ha)
- No. of vineyards: 3
- Grapes produced: Albariño, Barbera, Chardonnay, Grenache, Malbec, Mourvedre, Petite Sirah, Sauvignon Blanc, Syrah, Tempranillo, Viognier, Zinfindel
- No. of wineries: 3

Winters Highlands is an American Viticultural Area (AVA) located in portions of Solano and Yolo Counties, California. It is located in the easternmost foothills of the northern Coast Range where it adjoins the Sacramento Valley, a segment of the vast California Central Valley. The wine appellation was established on August 29, 2023, as the nation's 269^{th}, the state's 149^{th} and Yolo County's fifh AVA by the Alcohol and Tobacco Tax and Trade Bureau (TTB), Treasury after reviewing the petition submitted on behalf of Berryessa Gap Vineyards proposing a viticultural area named "Winters Highlands." The elongated Winters Highlands, on a north–south axis, encompasses approximately 7,296 acres (11.4 sq mi) where its eastern boundary is adjacent to the city of Winters and is isolated from any other AVA. There are planted vineyards covering approximately 134 acres (54 ha) in the viticultural area with three wineries. According to the petition, an additional 60 acres (24 ha) are planned for cultivation in the next few years. The distinguishing features of Winters Highlands are its climate, specifically, its temperature, precipitation, relative air humidity, and its soils. Grape varietals grown in the AVA include Petite Syrah, Tempranillo, Malbec, and Chardonnay.

== History ==
The city of Winters, in western Yolo county, has a long history of agricultural production, and grapes are one of crops produced here starting in the 1840s. Impressed by the fertile soil and constant water supply from the Putah Creek, John Wolfskill established vineyards and orchards to produce fresh fruits in 1842. The fruits, including grapes, served local miners during the gold rush around 1848. The historic distinction of this microclimate in western Yolo County allowed production of many varieties of products to be ripe earlier than other places in northern California. By the early 1860s train lines of the California Pacific Railroad were delivering agriculture and other natural products produced in eastern Yolo County from the Davisville station to ships in Solano County at ports in Suisun. The ability to transport these products from western Yolo County, however, was cut off by Putah Creek until the establishment of the train trestle over Putah Creek. Once the bridge was completed in 1875, a community that would come to be called Winters for Thedore Winters, and early rancher and livestock breeder, was soon populated by early farming families that would use the newly connected train line to send their crops to market. The late 1800s brought a booming economy of perishable horticultural crops, mainly peaches and apricots, and then later in the 1900s walnuts and almonds. The stone fruit that became ripe early due to this unique microclimate gave Winters a reputation that in this narrow section of western Yolo County production the first fruit of the year, and therefore commanded top prices. Accordingly, secondary businesses that supported the farm industry took hold in the small town of Winters.
Crop-based research was initiated in Wolfskill Orchards in Winters from 1930s, and grapes were one of the major crop studied. Wolfskill Orchards was established on 1934 after John Wolfskill's daughter, Frances, donated 107 acres (43 ha) of land to the University of California, Davis. In 1980, United States Department of Agriculture (USDA) Agricultural Research Service (ARS) established the National Clonal Germplasm Repository at Wolfskill Orchards. Due to the low air humidity and low disease pressure, 3,600 different excisions of grapes are currently planted there.

== Terroir ==
=== Topography ===
Winters Highlands is a region of steep to gentle slopes ranging from 100 to 400 ft (30–122 m) in elevation nestled along the eastern edge of the Coast Range and encompasses the alluvial deposits of Putah Creek, which flows through the southern portion of the AVA. The northern boundary follows Chickahominy Slough to separate the higher, rolling terrain of the AVA from the flatter, lower terrain of the Sacramento Valley. The eastern boundary follows the 170-foot elevation contour, the Highland Canal, and County Road 88 and also separates the AVA from the Sacramento Valley floor. The southern boundary follows a series of roads to approximate the extent of the alluvial deposits of Putah Creek. The western boundary follows a series of straight lines drawn between points and separates the AVA from the higher, steeper elevations of the Coast Range.

=== Climate ===
The petition included information on the average monthly precipitation amounts for the Winters Highlands AVA and the surrounding locations. The data was collected from the same locations and during the same time period as the previously discussed GDD and temperature data. The AVA and surrounding regions are all dry during the summer months (May to August), and precipitation takes place mainly during the winter months (January to March). From January to March, precipitation amounts in the AVA were similar to amounts in Dixon, to the southeast of the AVA; greater than the amounts in the regions to the southwest, east, and northeast; and lower than the amounts to the west. From September to December, the AVA has similar average monthly precipitation as the regions to the east and southeast but is drier than the regions to the west and southwest and wetter than the region to the northeast. According to the petition, precipitation amounts influence the amount of water retained in the soil and vineyard irrigation decisions during the growing season. The petition also included average relative air humidity for the same locations and time period as used in the precipitation data. The AVA has lower humidity than all the surrounding regions throughout the year, with the exception of October and November, when the humidity in the AVA rises slightly and becomes similar to that of the region to the northeast. Air humidity during the growing season has a profound influence on pest and disease control in vineyards.
The location of the Winters Highlands influences its temperatures located on the eastern side of the Coast Ranges, which provides shelter from much of the cool air blowing eastward from the Pacific Ocean. However, the Berryessa Gap, a break in the Coast Ranges where Putah Creek flows into the man-made Lake Berryessa, does allow some cool air from the Pacific Ocean directly into the AVA, particularly in the evenings. As a result, the AVA tends to have cooler evenings than the more inland regions to the east of the AVA. The AVA has a greater number of growing degree days (GDDs) 1 than surrounding areas, with a wide difference between daily high and low temperatures, a set of conditions that promotes the growing of Mediterranean-type grapes. Winters Highlands AVA has an average GDD accumulation that is greater than accumulations in each of the surrounding locations except the Woodland location, located northeast of the AVA. The petition also discussed the average monthly minimum and maximum temperatures for the same locations and range of dates included in the GDD information section. According to the petition, regional differences in the average monthly maximum temperature are most noticeable between May and September. During those months, the average monthly maximum temperature in the Winters Highlands AVA is greater than in all other regions except the Woodland region. The petition states that from March to September, the average monthly minimum temperature in the AVA is similar to that of the Davis and Woodland locations, to the east and northeast of the AVA, and higher than temperatures in the other surrounding locations. The petition states that frost-free days are the criterion for the length of the growing season for wine grape production regions, as spring frost can damage the newly emerged shoots and fall frost can lead to leaf senescence and berry damage. The petition included frost-free day data from the Western Regional Climate Center, which was based on the weather record of more than 60 years. Winters Highlands has more frost-free days (290) than any of the other locations except the Davis location (310), to the east of the AVA.
The vineyards experience lower nighttime temperatures than those just a few miles north, south, or east of Winter Highlands, especially from May through September. Low nighttime temperatures during the growing season allow the vineyards to produce grapes with less acid giving winemakers the ability to soften the acidic edge of the whites and lighter red varieties. This gives winemakers an ability to blend wines with subtle flavors. Warm growing season temperatures favor grapes grown historically in the warmer regions of Spain and Southern France, such as Verdelho, Verdejo, Albariño, Sauvignon Blanc, Grenache, Petite Sirah, and Tempranillo. Winter Highlands also mimics microclimate conditions found in pockets of Croatia where Zinfandel grapes grow well. The drier climate favors wine grape growing because it doesn't encourage mildew and mold like in the more humid and cooler regions or those that are subject to fog. The grapes remain viable into a later harvest season and gives winemakers some wider flexibility age and blend wines with subtle flavors that are distinct from surrounding AVA's.

=== Soil ===
The soils are important to viticulture because the soil profile can play a significant role in vine growth, fruit composition, and wine characteristics. The soils within Winters Highlands AVA are dominated by fine clay or loamy alfisols and inceptisols with gentle to steep slopes. All the soils are in the thermic soil temperature regime, meaning the mean annual soil temperature is between 59 and 72 °F (15 and 22 °C) The soils are also described as belonging to the xeric soil moisture regime, meaning they are warm and rather dry in the summer and cool and wet in the winter. Soils within the AVA are mostly well or moderately well drained, which is critical for root growth and respiration. The petition also states that soils within Winters Highlands AVA generally have a lower soil pH due to the low levels of precipitation the area receives. The petition claims that soils in wetter regions, such as the regions west of the AVA, are subject to a greater level of cation leaching, which can increase the pH of soils and lead to a difference in available soil nutrients. As a result, different fertilization and irrigation practices may be necessary in vineyards with high pH soils. The petition states that although the soil texture and temperature and moisture regimes of the soils within the Winters Highlands AVA are similar, the parent materials of the soils differ. The AVA is located in an area where two geomorphic provinces, the Central Valley and the Coast Range, meet. The Central Valley is an alluvial plain with continuous deposits. The northern Coast Range is dominated by Franciscan rock (composed of sedimentary rock mixed with igneous rock) and metamorphic rock. As a result, soils closer to the Central Valley, such as the Yolo and Sycamore series found in the northeastern portion of the AVA, are very deep and derived from mixed sources on the alluvial fan. Soils closer to the Coast Range, such as the Balcom and Diablo soils found in the western and southeastern portions of the AVA, are relatively shallow and formed on the terraces from sedimentary rocks. To the north and south of the AVA, the soils have a similar profile to those of the AVA. However, the petition states that soils with poor or somewhat poor drainage, such as the Clear Lake series, are more prevalent in the region to the north, and soils derived from sedimentary rocks, rather than alluvium, are more common in the region to the south. To the east and southeast of the AVA, the soils are dominated by clay, loamy clay, and loam soils formed from the alluvium of mixed sources on nearly level to gentle slopes. To the southwest of the AVA, soils are mainly loamy clay mollisols, vertisols, ultisols, and alfisols on alluvial fans and terraces.

== Viticulture ==
In 1969, Dan Martinez Sr., partnered with San Francisco winemaker Ernest Peninou, started a nursery business to sell certificated rootstocks to commercial vineyards in Napa and Sonoma Counties. In 2000, Dan Martinez Jr. and Santiago Moreno built a 50-acre (20 ha) vineyard for their winery, Berryessa Gap Vineyards. In the same year, Rominger Brothers Farm started their 20-acre (8 ha) vineyard on their family ranch. And in 2007, Turkovich Family Wines established the Button Turkovich vineyard.
