= Cucamonga Valley =

Valley in California, United States of America

Coordinates: 34°01′10″N 117°37′40″W

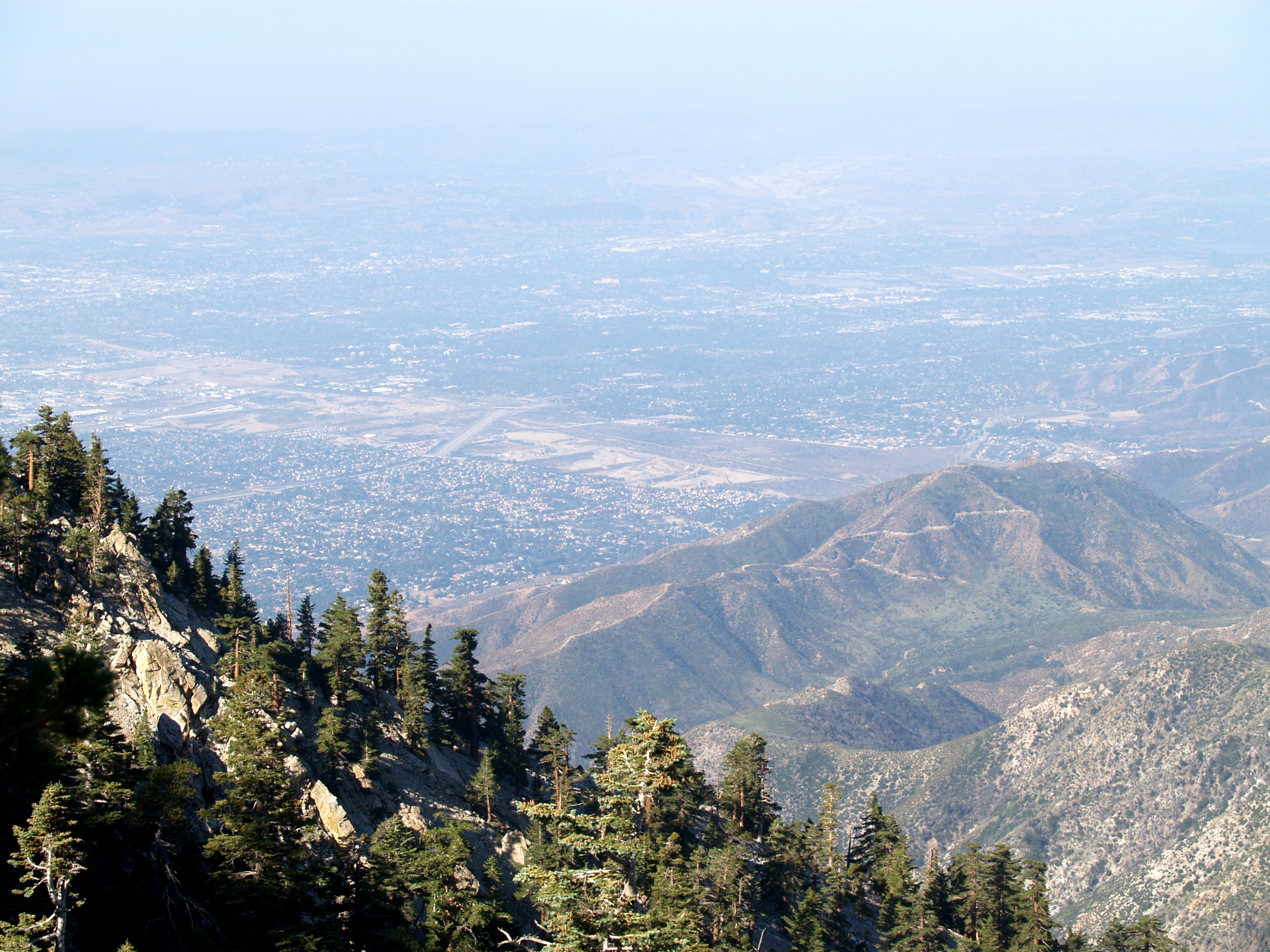

The Cucamonga Valley is a region of southwestern San Bernardino County and northwestern Riverside County, in southern California. It is located below the San Gabriel Mountains in the Inland Empire region.

== Geography ==
It is a region of the eastern Pomona Valley and western San Bernardino Valley. It is located between Los Angeles and San Bernardino.

The Cucamonga Valley AVA, a designated American Viticultural Area, is in the valley region. It was a major site of wine production in the late 19th through mid−20th centuries, before regional urban expansion with land development and suburbanization spread into the area.

=== Cities ===
- Corona
- Eastvale
- Fontana
- Jurupa Valley
- Norco
- Ontario
- Rancho Cucamonga
- Rialto

== Demographics ==
The demographics of the Cucamonga Valley have been shifting in recent years. The population of European Americans, who once constituted a large majority, is on the decline while the population of Latinos and African Americans is growing. Unlike most of Southern California, there is not a particularly strong representation of Asian Americans in the Cucamonga Valley, although it is steadily increasing. The city of Rancho Cucamonga has the highest population of Asian Americans in the Cucamonga Valley, at 9.0% of the population.

== Transportation ==
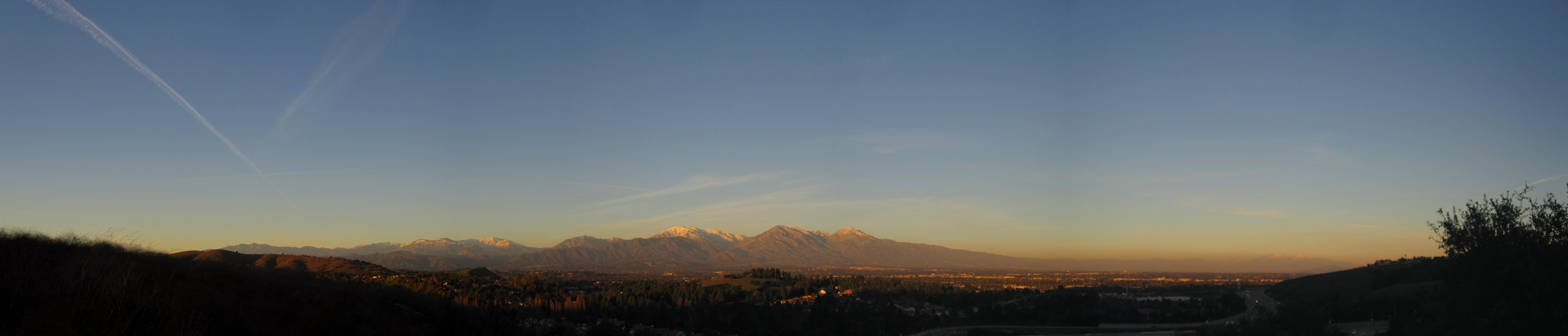
View of Pomona Valley and Cucamonga Valley (far right) from Diamond Ranch High School in Pomona

=== Public transit ===
- Public transportation in San Bernardino County, California
- Public transportation in Riverside County, California

Two Metrolink commuter rail lines, the San Bernardino Line and the Riverside Line, serve the Cucamonga Valley area. The lines are named for their eastern terminal stations, with their shared western terminal being Los Angeles Union Station.

=== Highways ===
Freeways running in an east–west direction are (from northernmost to southernmost) State Route 210, Interstate 10, State Route 60 and State Route 91. Interstate 15 is the valley's only north–south running freeway.

Historic U.S. Route 66, as Foothill Boulevard, runs east–west through the region. Other major surface streets include Base Line Road, Arrow Route, 4th Street/San Bernardino Avenue, Van Buren/Mission Boulevard, and Valley Boulevard running east–west and Archibald Avenue, Sierra Avenue, and Riverside Avenue running north–south.

== See also ==
- California wine
- Pomona Valley topics
