= Santa Maria Valley AVA =

American Viticultural Area in California, United States

Coordinates: 34°51′15″N 120°15′42″W

Santa Maria Valley
- Wine region
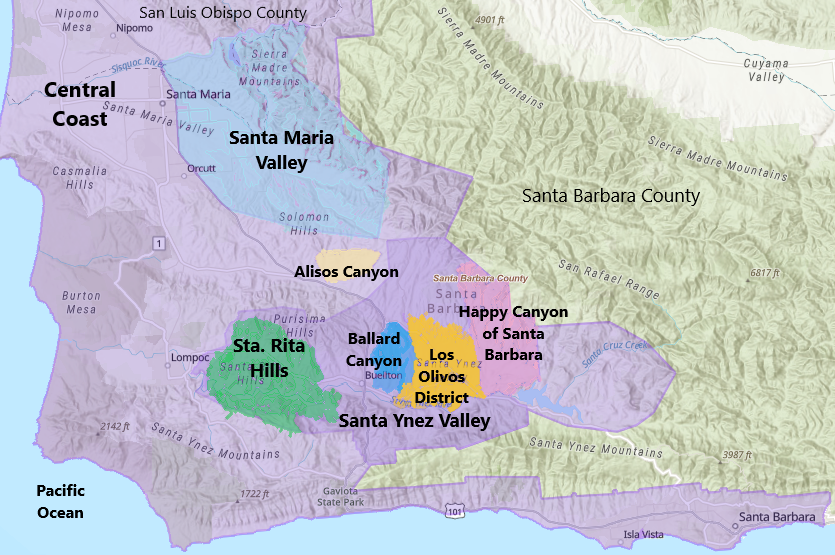
- Type: American Viticultural Area
- Year established: 1981; 2011 Exp
- Years of wine industry: 196
- Country: United States
- Part of: California, Central Coast AVA, Santa Barbara County
- Other regions in California, Central Coast AVA, Santa Barbara County: Alisos Canyon AVA, Ballard Canyon AVA, Happy Canyon of Santa Barbara AVA, Los Olivos District AVA, Santa Ynez Valley AVA, Sta. Rita Hills AVA
- Climate region: Region I-II
- Total area: 97,483 acres (152 sq mi); 2010: 116,273 acres (182 sq mi)
- Size of planted vineyards: 7,500 acres (3,035 ha); 2010 exp: 7,755 acres (3,138 ha)
- Grapes produced: Aligote, Cabernet Sauvignon, Chardonnay, Chenin blanc, Grenache, Malbec, Marsanne, Merlot, Mondeuse, Nebbiolo, Petit Verdot, Pinot blanc, Pinot gris, Pinot noir, Riesling, Roussanne, Sangiovese, Sauvignon blanc, Silvaner, Syrah, Tocai Friulano, Viognier, Zinfandel

Santa Maria Valley is an American Viticultural Area (AVA) which straddles the boundary of Santa Barbara and San Luis Obispo counties in the south Central Coast of California. It was established as the nation's third, the state's second and both counties' initial appellation on August 5, 1981, by the Bureau of Alcohol, Tobacco and Firearms (ATF), Treasury after reviewing the petition submitted by area vintners and wine grape growers proposing the viticultural area named "Santa Maria Valley."
A portion of the AVA crosses the Cuyama River into the southernmost corner of San Luis Obispo County. The east–west orientation of the 97,483-acre (152 sq mi) open valley and rolling hills allows cool winds and fog to freely flow in from the Pacific Ocean, settling most noticeably in lower-lying areas. The result is a mild Mediterranean climate that lengthens the growing season and contributes to the eventual sugar/acid balance in the grapes from Santa Maria Valley's 7,500 acres (3,000 ha) cultivated vineyards. According to the petition, the area has recently cultivated wine grapes for a decade. On December 29, 2010, the AVA was designated a 29.4-square-mile (18,790-acre) expansion to its southern boundary.

== History ==
Santa Maria Valley has a rich viticulture history in California. Grape-growing in the region dates back to the Mexican Colonial period of the 1830s. Modern viticulture in the Santa Maria Valley dates back to 1964 when more than 100 acres of vineyards were planted in the Santa Maria Valley. The new growers believed the area could grow wine grapes to rival the Napa Valley. By the mid-1970s, established vineyards increased cultivation to over 2,000 acres (810 ha).

== Terroir ==
=== Geography ===
The Santa Maria Valley is a natural funnel-shaped valley opening west to the Pacific Ocean. The elevation of the area ranges from approximately 200 feet (60 m) at the intersection of Highway 101 and the Santa Maria River to approximately 3,200 feet (980 m) at Tepusquet Peak. The area acreage lies within the watershed of the Santa Maria River and includes portions of primary tributary valleys of the Cuyama River, Sisquoc River and Suey Creek to the north, Tepesquet Creek to the east, and Bradley Canyon to the south. The grapes that are grown within the area are on the valley floor at an approximate elevation of 300 feet (90 m) and on the slopes and rolling hillsides up to an elevation of 800 feet (240 m).

=== Climate ===
Santa Maria, California

Climate chart (precipitation, max. and min. temperature)
J	F	M	A	M	J	J	A	S	O	N	D
3.1 64 39	3.5 65 41	3.2 66 43	1 69 44	0.3 71 47	0.1 74 50	0.1 77 52	0.1 78 53	0.3 78 52	0.5 76 48	1.4 70 43	2.1 64 38
- █ Average max. and min. temperatures in °F
- █ Precipitation totals in inches
Metric conversion
J	F	M	A	M	J	J	A	S	O	N	D
79 18 4	89 18 5	81 19 6	25 21 7	7.6 22 8	2.5 23 10	2.5 25 11	2.5 26 12	7.6 26 11	13 24 9	36 21 6	53 18 3
- █ Average max. and min. temperatures in °C
- █ Precipitation totals in mm

The Santa Maria Valley geography channels dense banks of morning fog from the Pacific Ocean that takes many hours to burn off, only to be replaced by chilly afternoon breezes. This "maritime fringe" climate lengthens the growing season and contributes to the eventual sugar/acid balance in the grapes from the region. Summer in the Santa Maria Valley is goose-bump season, with an average summer temperature of only 75 °F (24 °C). This is a growing environment that is a Region I on the Winkler Scale. As with most of Santa Barbara County, annual rainfall is very low in the Santa Maria Valley. The AVA averages less than 14 inches (360 mm) in non-drought years. Vines typically require 20–30 inches (510–760 mm) of water per year for dry-farming, therefore, irrigation is essential.

Climate data for City of Santa Maria, California
Month	Jan	Feb	Mar	Apr	May	Jun	Jul	Aug	Sep	Oct	Nov	Dec	Year
Record high °F (°C)	89 (32)	89 (32)	95 (35)	103 (39)	105 (41)	110 (43)	104 (40)	104 (40)	106 (41)	108 (42)	96 (36)	90 (32)	110 (43)
Mean daily maximum °F (°C)	64.3 (17.9)	64.7 (18.2)	66.3 (19.1)	69.0 (20.6)	71.4 (21.9)	74.3 (23.5)	76.6 (24.8)	77.8 (25.4)	77.8 (25.4)	75.6 (24.2)	70.0 (21.1)	64.4 (18.0)	71.0 (21.7)
Mean daily minimum °F (°C)	39.1 (3.9)	41.1 (5.1)	42.7 (5.9)	43.6 (6.4)	46.6 (8.1)	49.6 (9.8)	52.3 (11.3)	53.0 (11.7)	51.6 (10.9)	47.8 (8.8)	43.0 (6.1)	38.2 (3.4)	45.7 (7.6)
Record low °F (°C)	20 (−7)	22 (−6)	24 (−4)	28 (−2)	27 (−3)	35 (2)	41 (5)	40 (4)	32 (0)	26 (−3)	21 (−6)	20 (−7)	20 (−7)
Average precipitation inches (mm)	3.11 (79)	3.50 (89)	3.19 (81)	0.96 (24)	0.32 (8.1)	0.05 (1.3)	0.03 (0.76)	0.05 (1.3)	0.31 (7.9)	0.54 (14)	1.35 (34)	2.08 (53)	15.49 (393)

=== Soils ===
The soils range in texture from sandy loam to clay loam and are free from adverse salts. Soil variation can be broadly categorized into four types. Three types are within the original Santa Maria Valley AVA: the Valley floor, the Solomon Hills, and the foothills of the Sierra Madre Mountains, northeast of the Santa Maria River. The fourth is the southern expansion area. Along the northern portion of the Santa Maria-Sisquoc River colluvial soils cover slope sides giving rocky freshness to grapes grown throughout. Towards the river side, soils become unconsolidated as mixed alluvial soils appear. The soils are mainly sand, sandy loam, and loam on the valley floor, but are mixed sandy, clay, shaly, and silt loams on mountain slopes. However, the soils in the expansion area are the same type as in the original Santa Maria Valley area. In the expansion area and on hills in the original viticultural area, the soils are sand, sandy, clay, and shaly loams.

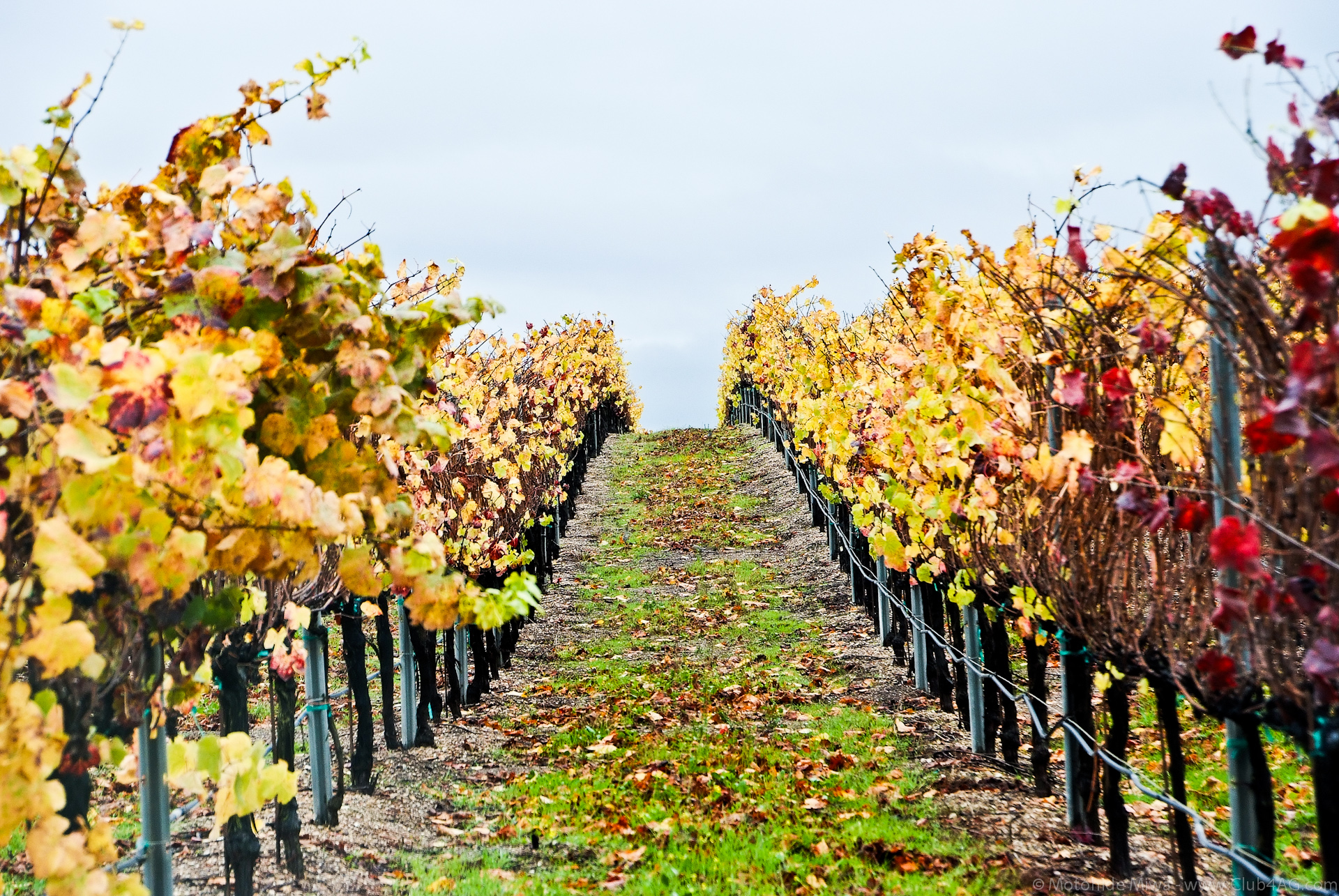
Santa Maria Valley vineyards

== Viticulture ==
Due to the cooler mesoclimates, the valley is renowned for producing some of California's finest Pinot Noir and Chardonnay wines. These are the appellation's two flagship varieties.

== Expansion ==
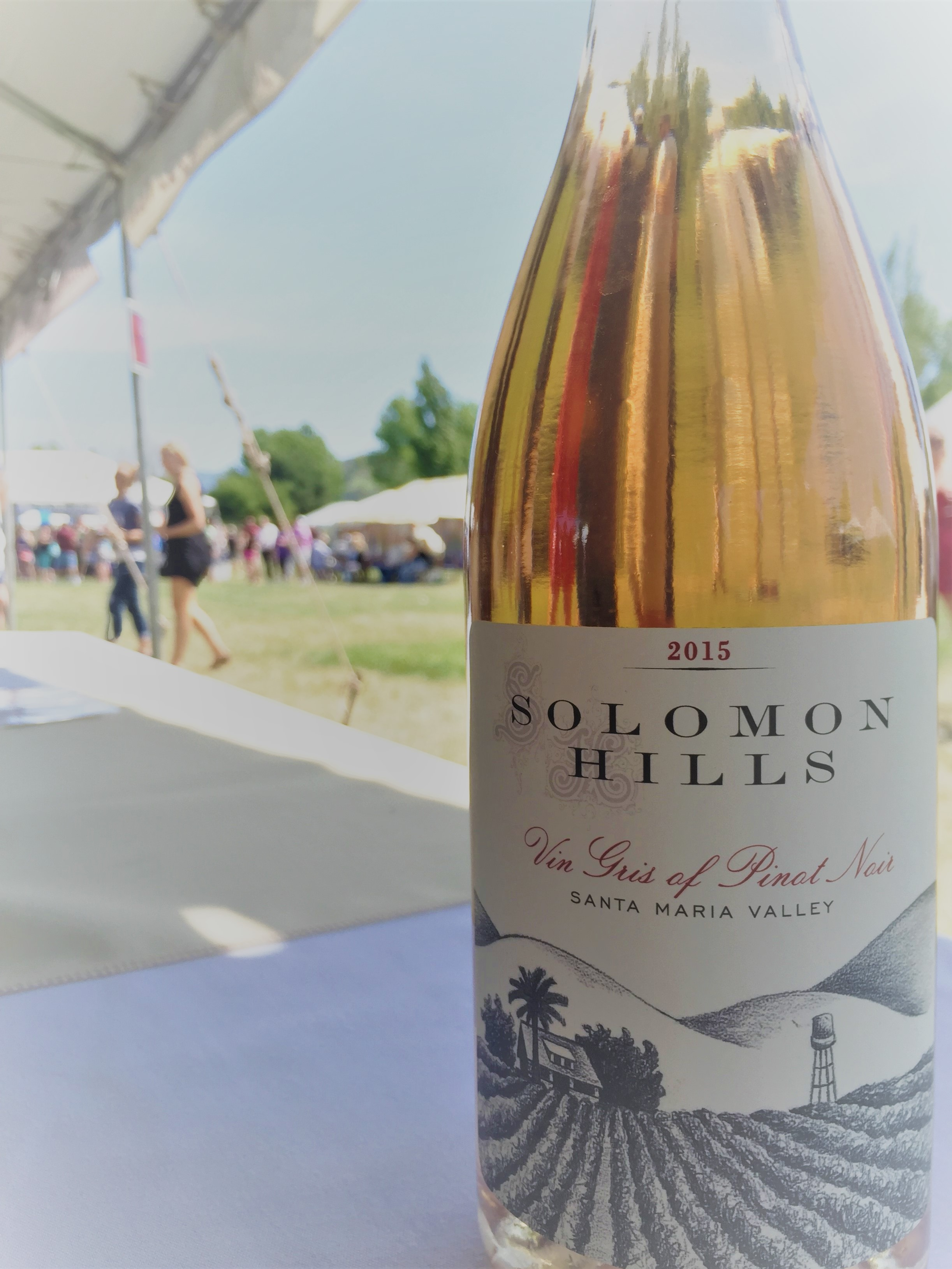
Solomon Hills Vineyard was one of the vineyards included with the expansion of the Santa Maria AVA.

On December 29, 2010, the TTB ruled to expand the southern border of the Santa Maria Valley American Viticultural Area (AVA). The expansion was intended to align with the physical watershed boundary of the Santa Maria River. The revised boundary approximately follows the ridge line dividing the Santa Maria Valley from the Los Alamos Valley. It lies in northern Santa Barbara County, according to the boundary description and USGS maps, and is entirely within the Central Coast viticultural area. The expansion added 18,790 acres (29 sq mi), nine vineyards, 255 acres (103 ha) of commercial viticulture, and 60–200 acres (24–81 ha) under viticultural development to the area increasing its total size to 116,273 acres (182 sq mi).
