= Alisos Canyon AVA =

American Viticultural Area in Santa Barbara County, California, United States

Coordinates: 34°45′08″N 120°12′39″W

Alisos Canyon
- Wine region
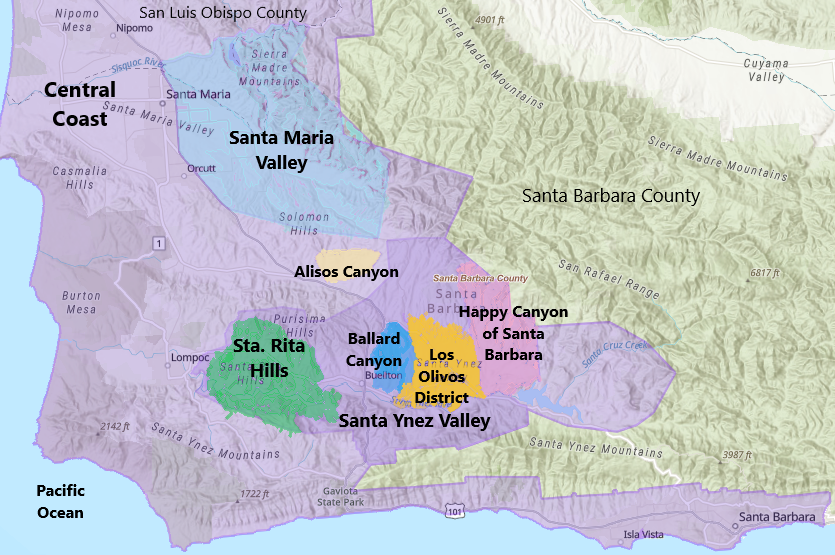
- Type: American Viticultural Area
- Year established: 2020
- Country: United States
- Part of: California, Central Coast AVA, Santa Barbara County
- Other regions in California, Central Coast AVA, Santa Barbara County: Santa Maria Valley AVA, Santa Ynez Valley AVA, Sta. Rita Hills AVA, Ballard Canyon AVA, Happy Canyon AVA, Los Olivos District AVA
- Growing season: 309 days
- Climate region: Region II
- Heat units: 2,617-2,691 GDD units
- Precipitation (annual average): 12–18 inches (305–457 mm)
- Soil conditions: Sandstone, shale, chalky soils & flint rocks
- Total area: 5,774 acres (9.0 sq mi)
- Size of planted vineyards: 238 acres (96 ha)
- No. of vineyards: 9
- Varietals produced: Cabernet Franc, Cabernet Sauvignon, Chardonnay, Grenache, Pinot Gris, Sauvignon Blanc, Syrah, Viognier
- No. of wineries: 1

Alisos Canyon is an American Viticultural Area (AVA), located in Santa Barbara County, California due east outside the small town of Los Alamos on U.S 101 and about 20 miles (32 km) south of Santa Maria. It was established as the nation's 249th, the state's 140th and the county's seventh AVA on August 24, 2020 by the Alcohol and Tobacco Tax and Trade Bureau (TTB), Treasury after reviewing the petition submitted by Wesley D. Hagen, Viticulturist and Winemaker, on behalf of local vineyard owners and winemakers, proposing a viticultural area in Santa Barbara County named "Alisos Canyon."
The appellation stretches west to east over 5,774 acres (9 sq mi) with one bonded winery and nine commercially producing vineyards cultivates on approximately 238 acres (96 ha). Alisos Canyon Road bisects the region accessing many of its vineyards. The USDA plant hardiness zone ranges from 8b to 9b.

== Terroir ==
The distinguishing features of Alisos Canyon include its topography, soil and climate. The AVA exhibits a unique viticultural influence of the San Antonio Creek Valley which runs directly from the mouth of Alisos and Comasa Canyons to the Pacific Ocean 20 miles (32 km) to the west. The ingress of cooling marine winds and fog along the San Antonio Creek Valley helps define the climate of Alisos Canyon.

=== Climate ===
The marine-influenced climate is also the basic viticultural feature of the Central Coast AVA. The climate of Alisos Canyon is affected by cool marine air which travels into the area via the drainage system of San Antonio Creek. The AVA is located approximately 25 miles (40 km) from the Pacific Ocean and is situated in a transitional region, between the cooler coastal regions and the warmer inland areas. Growing degree day accumulations within the Alisos Canyon are higher than those of the regions to the northwest and southwest, which are closer to the ocean, and lower than those in the more inland regions to the south and east. The region due north of the AVA also has higher growing degree day accumulations due to its location east of ridges and hills which trap warm air and block cool marine air from entering the region. According to the petition, the AVA's location is a "Goldilocks Rhone Zone," meaning that temperatures are neither too hot nor too cold for growing Rhone wine varietals such as Syrah, which is the most common varietal grown in the canyon.

=== Soil ===
Soils within the Alisos Canyon AVA are primarily derived from weathered sandstone and shale. The most common soils are the Paso Robles Formation and Careaga Sandstone, which comprise 63 percent and 13 percent of the total soils, respectively. High calcium content from shale pebbles increases the thickness of the skins of red varietal wine grapes, which in turn increases the color and tannin levels in the resulting wine. High sand content provides excellent drainage for vineyards, thus reducing the risks from certain pests such as nematodes and phylloxera. The low clay content of Careaga Sandstone soils reduces the uptake of nutrients and reduces the vigor of the vines, resulting in smaller grapes with a higher skin-to-juice ratio than grapes of the same varietal grown in different soils with higher clay content. To the north of the Alisos Canyon, within the Santa Maria Valley, the soils have sandier top soils. South of the Alisos Canyon, the soils are characterized by Metz fine sandy loam. To the east, the soils are primarily derived from serpentine and chert. To the west of the AVA, the soils are described as deep, sandy soils of the Shedd, Chamise, and Point Sal Formation series.

== Wine Industry ==
Alisos Canyon lies entirely within the multi-county Central Coast AVA and does not share boundaries with another AVA. In the petition, there is one bonded winery and nine commercially producing vineyards cultivating a total of 238 acres (96 ha) within the region's 5,774 acres (9.022 sq mi) coverage. According to the petition, the distinguishing features of the proposed Alisos Canyon AVA include its climate and soils. The petition also listed topography and geology as distinguishing features. However, based on the petition's descriptions, topography and geology appear to be too integral to the region's climate and soils, respectively, to be considered separately from those features. Therefore, TTB did not consider topography and geology to be separate distinguishing features of the proposed AVA. The petitioners noted Alisos Canyon as a "nascent and narrowly-focused Rhone-focused wine region ready for exploration, only two hours north of Los Angeles and 45 minutes from downtown Santa Barbara."
