= Jalama =

Jalama may refer to:

- Al Jalama, one of two places in Palestine;
- the Jalama Formation, a Cretaceous rock unit in Southern California
- Jalama Beach County Park, a beach park in Santa Barbara County, California
- Jalama Wines, a California winery
- Jálama, a Spanish mountain
