= Santa Barbara County wine =

Wine region in California, US

Coordinates: 34°36′48″N 120°11′21″W

Santa Barbara County
- Wine region
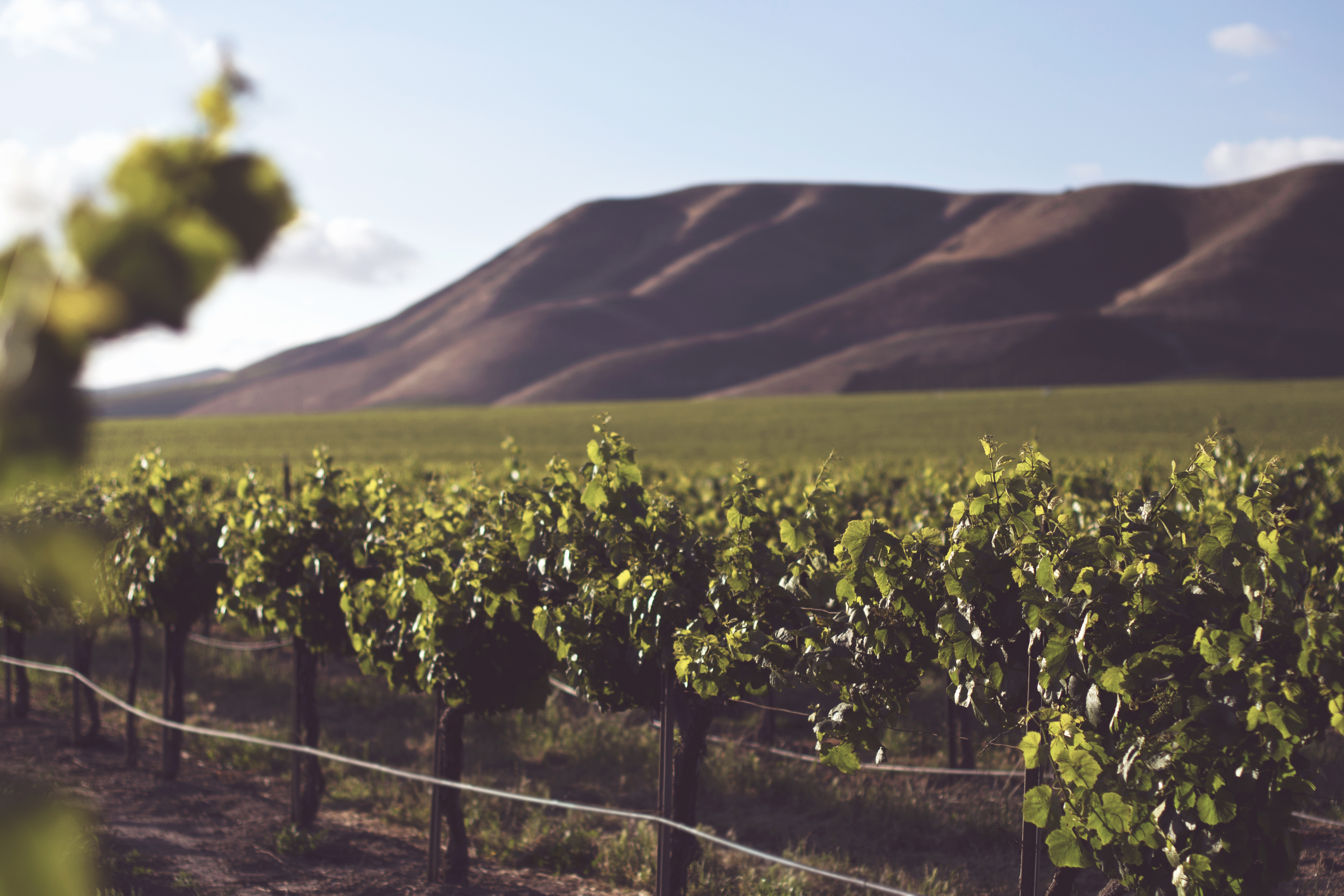
- Type: U.S. County Appellation
- Years of wine industry: 256
- Country: United States
- Part of: California, Central Coast AVA
- Other regions in California, Central Coast AVA: Monterey County, San Luis Obispo County
- Sub-regions: Santa Maria Valley AVA, Santa Ynez Valley AVA, Sta. Rita Hills AVA, Happy Canyon of Santa Barbara AVA, Ballard Canyon AVA, Los Olivos District AVA, Alisos Canyon AVA
- Climate region: Region I, II
- Soil conditions: Ancient marine: calcareous limestone, diatomaceous earth (aka DE), sandy and clay loam
- Total area: 1,749,760 acres (2,734 sq mi)
- Size of planted vineyards: 20,000 acres (8,094 ha)
- Varietals produced: Albariño, Barbera, Cabernet Franc, Cabernet Sauvignon, Carignan, Chardonnay, Chenin blanc, Cinsaut, Counoise, Dolcetto, Freisa, Gamay, Gamay Beaujolais, Gamay Noir, Gewürztraminer, Graciano, Grenache, Grenache Gris Rose, Grenache Noir, Grüner Veltliner, Malbec, Malvasia Bianca, Marsanne, Mencía, Merlot, Muscat Canelli, Muscat Orange, Nebbiolo, Petit Verdot, Durif/Petite Syrah, Petit Verdot, Piquepoul, Pinot blanc, Pinot gris, Pinot Meunier, Pinot noir, Red Rhone Blends, Riesling, Roussanne, Sangiovese, Sauvignon blanc, Sauvignon Musqué, Sémillon, Silvaner, Syrah, Tempranillo, Trousseau gris, Valdiguié, Vermentino, Viognier, White Bordeaux Blend, White Rhone Blends, Zinfandel
- No. of wineries: 275+

Santa Barbara County wine is an appellation that designates wine made from grapes grown mostly in Santa Barbara County, California, which is located approximately 50 miles (80 km) northwest of Los Angeles County. County names in the United States automatically qualify as legal appellations of origin for wine produced from grapes grown in that county and do not require registration with the Alcohol and Tobacco Tax and Trade Bureau (TTB) of the Treasury Department. TTB was created in January 2003, when the Bureau of Alcohol, Tobacco and Firearms, or ATF, was extensively reorganized under the provisions of the Homeland Security Act of 2002.

Viticulture in Santa Barbara County is traceable to missionary plantings in the Milpas Valley late in the 18th century when Spanish Jesuit missionaries planted Vitis vinifera vines native to the Mediterranean region in their established missions to produce wine for religious services. In the 1770s, Spanish missionaries continued the practice under the direction of Father Junipero Serra who brought grapevine cuttings from Mexico to be planted near Sycamore Creek. Since commercial viticulture rebounded in the 1960s, Santa Barbara County has been on the fast track to viticultural stardom. Its grapes now command among the highest prices anywhere in the state. In 1965, soil and climatic studies indicated that the Santa Ynez and Santa Maria valleys offered suitable conditions for growing high-quality wine grapes. Thus launched a revival of the area's two-centuries-old wine industry which, in 1995, made Santa Barbara County an internationally prominent wine region. The county is famous primarily for the quality of its Chardonnay and Pinot Noir, and is gaining a reputation for growing Rhone varietals such as Syrah and Viognier.

Santa Barbara County vintners face the multiple challenges of selecting grape varieties appropriate to their unique conditions, protecting their crops from disease and insects, developing local wineries, and promoting their products in the highly competitive national and international markets. They contribute significantly to California's status as a primer international wine producer.

== History ==
Santa Barbara County has a rich wine making history dating back to 1782 when Father Junipero Serra brought grapevine cuttings from Mexico to be planted near Sycamore Creek. In 1804, the largest mission vineyard, 25 acres (10 ha), was established just north of Santa Barbara, adjacent to San Jose Creek on land that is now part of Goléta. By the late 1800s, there were 45 vineyards in the area including a 150 acres (61 ha) vineyard on Santa Cruz Island. Meanwhile, a grapevine planted in 1842 on a farm in Carpinteria grew to monstrous proportions. In fifty years, it had a trunk measuring nine feet around, an arbor covering two acres with an annual yield of ten tons of grapes.

The oldest pre-Prohibition vineyard in California is the San Jose Vineyard situated under the Santa Ynez Mountains between Goléta and San Marcos Pass. The adobe winery was built, and it still stands as Goléta's oldest landmark. Originally the property of the Roman Catholic Church until 1853, it was sold by the Archbishop of the Los Angeles Diocese to an eccentric old pioneer named James McCaffrey, who, with his sons, cultivated the old vines, producing annually about 8,000 gallons of the best vintage. He cultivated the ancient vineyard for 30 years producing a good crop of wild oats for hay annually, but no plow was permitted to disturb the soil. Upon the sides of an ancient old adobe building was a vine which started near the door, divides and sends a branch in opposite directions, and formed a circuit of the building, more than 100 feet (30 m) with both ends grafted together, forming a complete hoop around the building.

Santa Barbara County's first post-Prohibition commercial winery, aptly named Santa Barbara Winery, was founded in 1962 by Pierre Lafond, the 32-year-old owner of a popular wine and cheese shop. Two years later, the county's first commercial wine grape vineyard was planted by UC Davis viticulture graduates Uriel Nielsen and Bill De Mattei in the Santa Maria Valley. The Santa Barbara Winery is currently in operation cultivating over 77,000 acres (31,000 ha) with 60+ varieties. Other pioneers included Firestone, Sanford, Rancho Sisquoc and Zaca Mesa. By 1980, local vintners began fine-tuning vineyard plantings and winemaking to reflect Santa Barbara's terroir.

== Terroir ==
Santa Barbara County is different than any other wine growing region in the world and is literally "Sideways", as the acclaimed 2004 wine movie title partly defines this unique geography. It is the longest east–west transverse valley found on the Americas Pacific coast from Alaska to Cape Horn with the Santa Ynez River flowing westward on the valley floor toward the Pacific Ocean. This topography is also not found anywhere in the contiguous U.S. with a pair of mountain ranges, the Santa Ynez and San Rafael mountains, stretching in an east–west rather than north–south direction. This forms a funnel effect that ushers in fog and cool maritime air from the Pacific Ocean creating distinct micro-climates which extends the growing season. Therefore, the fruit has an unusually long "hang time" on the vine, allowing it to fully develop the acids, flavors and tannins needed to produce wines of distinctive character. Combined with plentiful sunshine and soils conducive to growing exemplary wine grapes, these favorable conditions are perfect for the cultivation of classic grape varietals as elements for a world-class wine growing region. Santa Barbara County is an oasis of rolling hills, ancient oak trees and cattle ranches claiming more than 200 wineries and 21,000 acres (8,500 ha) of vine, with the vast majority of the vineyards residing in seven AVAs: Santa Maria Valley, Santa Ynez Valley, Sta. Rita Hills, Happy Canyon, Ballard Canyon, Los Olivos District and Alisos Canyon, each with its own distinct terroir.

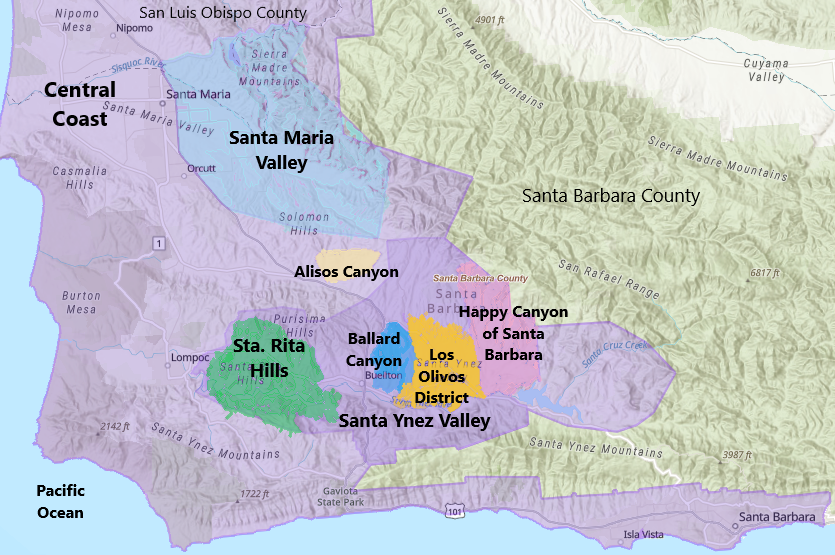
Santa Barbara County AVAs

== Santa Maria Valley AVA ==
Santa Maria Valley is an viticultural area which straddles the boundary of Santa Barbara and San Luis Obispo counties in California's multi-county Central Coast AVA. It was established on August 5, 1981, by the Bureau of Alcohol, Tobacco, Firearms and Explosives (ATF) as California's second oldest AVA. The northern portion of the AVA crosses the Cuyama River into the southernmost corner of San Luis Obispo County. The westward flowing Sisquoc River traverses the valley floor through the AVA toward the Cuyama River on its way to the Pacific. The east–west orientation of the 152.3 square miles (97,483 acres) with a wide, open valley and rolling hills means cool winds and fog flow in freely from the Pacific Ocean, settling most noticeably in lower-lying areas. The result is a Mediterranean climate that lengthens the growing season and contributes to the eventual sugar/acid balance in the grapes from Santa Maria Valley's 7,500-acre (3,000 ha) cultivated vineyards. On January 28, 2011, the AVA was granted an 29.4-square-mile (18,790-acre) expansion to its southern boundary.

== Santa Ynez Valley AVA ==
Santa Ynez Valley contains the greatest concentration of wineries in Santa Barbara County and established in 1983 within the geographical Santa Ynez Valley. The valley is formed by the Purisima Hills and San Rafael Mountains to the north and the Santa Ynez Mountains to the south, creating a long, east–west corridor with very cool temperatures on the coast that become progressively warmer inland. The Santa Ynez River flows east to west on the valley floor toward the Pacific Ocean.
As of 2023, the Santa Ynez Valley contains four other established viticultural areas: Sta. Rita Hills on its western boundary; Ballard Canyon and Los Olivos District occupying the center region; and Happy Canyon on the eastern border. Due to the various micro-climates, several varietals thrive, with Chardonnay being the most planted grape variety and Pinot Noir in the cooler, western portion of the valley, while Rhône and Italian varietals excel in the east are acclaimed in this versatile AVA.

== Sta. Rita Hills AVA ==
Sta. Rita Hills is a sub-appellation of the larger Santa Ynez Valley AVA, located between the towns of Lompoc and Buellton with the Purisima Hills to the north and the Santa Rosa Hills to the south. The hills run east to west, which allows cool ocean breezes from the nearby Pacific Ocean to enter the valley between the hills creating a cool micro-climate. When combined with the rocky nature of the area, the Sta. Rita Hills area is well-suited for the growing of Pinot noir grapes. The region is best known for its Chardonnay, Pinot noir, and Syrah varietal wines.

From its designation in 2001 through 2005, the wine appellation was officially named Santa Rita Hills AVA. The formal name change was the result of a protest by and subsequent negotiations with Vina Santa Rita, a large Chilean wine producer that was concerned about the AVA name diluting its international brand value. The name change took effect on January 5, 2006, with a yearlong period for producers in the AVA to change their wine labels. In 2016, the AVA was officially expanded approximately 2,296 acres (3.6 sq mi) along its eastern boundary.

Wineries and locations in the Sta. Rita Hills AVA are predominately featured in the critically acclaimed 2004 U.S. film Sideways. Sideways Fest is an annual three-day event hosted by the Sta. Rita Hills Wine Alliance celebrating the movie's release featuring the local viticulture and scenery.

== Happy Canyon of Santa Barbara AVA ==
Happy Canyon of Santa Barbara was designated November 2009 and is the smallest AVA in Santa Barbara County, covering 37 square miles (23,941 acres) with 492 acres (199 ha) of planted vine. The area comprises canyon terrain, hills, and river and creek basins to the east and south of the San Rafael Mountains, northwest of Lake Cachuma and north of the Santa Ynez River. Elevations within the AVA range from 500 feet (150 m) in the southwest corner to 3,430 feet (1,050 m) in the northeast corner, in the foothills of the San Rafael Range. It is home to six major vineyards and one active winery. TTB received the petition from Wes Hagen, Vineyard Manager and Winemaker at Clos Pepe Vineyards, Lompoc, California, on behalf of Happy Canyon vintners and grape growers, proposing the establishment of the "Happy Canyon of Santa Barbara" viticultural area.

== Ballard Canyon AVA ==
Ballard Canyon was officially recognized on October 2, 2013. The 7,800-acre (12 sq mi) designated area lies west of Ballard and Solvang townships while in the center of the Santa Ynez Valley AVA. Ballard Canyon lies further east in the valley of Sta. Rita Hills AVA and west of the Happy Canyon AVA without sharing boundaries nor overlaps either area. Its geography is a long, thin canyon that runs in a curve from north to south and is surrounded by a myriad of smaller canyons interspersed with dry, rugged hills. Ballard Canyon is highly regarded for its red wines made from Syrah and Grenache. The viticultural area was established with 10 commercially producing vineyards that cultivate approximately 565 acres (229 ha) with Syrah being the primary varietal.

== Los Olivos District AVA ==
Los Olivos District was established on January 20, 2016, and straddles the Santa Ynez Valley, formed by the Santa Ynez River, between the Purisima Hills above Solvang within the Santa Ynez Valley viticultural area. The area encompasses the townships of Los Olivos, Ballard, Santa Ynez and Solvang. State Route 154, known locally as the San Marcos Pass Road or Chumash Highway, bisects the region accessing many of the wineries and vineyards as it traverses toward its destination in Santa Barbara. The district stretches over 35.66 square miles (22,820 acres) where approximately twelve bonded wineries and forty-seven commercially producing vineyards cultivate 1,120 acres (450 ha). The district shares its western boundary with the eastern border of the Ballard Canyon AVA and its eastern boundary flanks the western perimeter of Happy Canyon of Santa Barbara AVA while not overlapping either AVA. The appellation is located on a broad alluvial terrace plain of the Santa Ynez River. The topography is relatively uniform, with nearly flat terrain that gently slopes southward toward the Santa Ynez River. The lack of steeply sloped hills reduces the risk of erosion and facilitates mechanical tiling and harvesting in the vineyards. The open terrain allows its vineyards to receive uniform amounts of sunlight, rainfall, and temperature-moderating fog because there are no significant hills or mountains to block the rainfall and fog or shade the vineyards.

== Alisos Canyon AVA ==
Alisos Canyon was officially designated on August 25, 2020, as the seventh AVA in the county. It lies entirely within the Central Coast AVA and does not share boundaries with another AVA. The 9.022-square-mile (5,774-acre) region is located south between the Santa Maria Valley and Santa Inez Valley viticulture areas near the town of Los Alamos. The area has been renowned for its high-quality fruit for several years and locals sought to give its informal recognition a more formal status by petitioning for their own AVA. In the petition, there is one bonded winery and nine commercially producing vineyard cultivating 238 acres (96 ha). The petitioners noted Alisos Canyon as a "nascent and narrowly-focused Rhone-focused wine region ready for exploration, only two hours north of Los Angeles and 45 minutes from downtown Santa Barbara."

== Industry growth ==
The film Sideways highly publicized Santa Barbara County viticulture, especially its Pinot Noir, showing the rest of the world the beauty and quality found in this cool climate growing region. The industry continues to grow and thrive with the addition of Los Olivos District and Alisos Canyon being the county's newest sub-AVAs. Santa Barbara wine grapes command among the highest price per tonnage in the state. There has been an increase in plantings of unique varietals including Chenin Blanc, Trousseau Gris, Gruner Veltliner, Cabernet Franc and Gamay. Amy Christine, a Master of Wine and grower in Sta Rita Hills, reports that this region is actively adding diversity to the region. Chardonnay and Pinot Noir began replacing Chenin blanc and White Riesling, and the county's cooler regions began hosting Rhone varietals such as Syrah, Grenache, Mourvedre, Viognier, Marsanne and Rousanne. Today, Chardonnay, Pinot Noir and Syrah are the most widely planted grapes. There are numerous "wine trails" in the County featuring wineries in all its AVAs and in the city of Santa Barbara.
