= Fiddlehead Cellars =

Winery in southern California

Coordinates: 34°38′31.7″N 120°26′19.3″W

- Fiddlehead Cellars logo
- Location: Lompoc, California, United States
- Opened to the public: 1989
- Key people: Kathy Joseph
- Varietals: Sauvignon blanc, Pinot noir
- Website: fiddleheadcellars.com

Fiddlehead Cellars is a winery based in Lompoc, California specializing in Sauvignon blanc and Pinot noir, producing an average of 5,000 cases of wine yearly. It was established by Kathy Joseph in 1989. Fiddlehead uses grapes from the Santa Ynez Valley AVA of Santa Barbara County, specifically the Sta. Rita Hills AVA for Pinot noir, and Oregon's Willamette Valley AVA. Winemaker Joseph has a graduate degree in Viticulture and Enology from University of California, Davis. Fiddlehead Cellars is a member of the Sta. Rita Hills Winegrowers Alliance and the Santa Barbara County Vintners' Association.

Fiddlehead's 2003 Sauvignon blanc was featured prominently in the 2004 film Sideways. The 1997 vintage of this wine was also listed as a Top 100 Wine in the San Francisco Chronicle.

Fiddlehead's Pinot noir has also been featured as a "top wine" on repeated occasions.
