= Kathy Joseph =

Californian winemaker and entrepreneur

- Born: Chicago, Illinois, United States
- Education: University of California Davis
- Occupations: Winemaker, entrepreneur, wine consultant
- Known for: Fiddlehead Cellars

Kathy Joseph is a Californian winemaker and entrepreneur, founder of Fiddlehead Cellars in Santa Maria, California. She is one of the first female winemakers to open her own winery in Santa Barbara County and her Fiddlehead Cellars is featured in the movie Sideways.

== Education and career ==
Originally from the Chicago area, Joseph received a Bachelor of Science degree in bacteriology from the University of Wisconsin, Madison. She then moved to California in the late 1970s to begin a career in the wine industry. After working in several wineries, she attended graduate school in Enology at the University of California, Davis. After graduation in 1984, she spent five years at Robert Pecota Winery as Head Winemaker.

In 1989, Joseph opened her own winery, Fiddlehead Cellars in Lompoc, California. This was an unusual place to open a winery at the time, and Joseph was a pioneer as both a female winemaker and on account of her location choice. She focused on the then lesser-appreciated varieties of wine - Pinot Noir and Sauvignon Blanc. Fiddlehead celebrated its 25rd vintage in 2013 and is distributed among restaurants and through a wine club. Her wine has won various awards, to include San Francisco Chronicle's Top 100 Wines in 1999, 2000, and 2001.

Joseph has taught classes at Napa Valley College and UC Davis, and her Fiddlestix wine was featured in a scene in the movie Sideways.
