= Jalama Wines =

American winery located in California

Coordinates: 33.8222°N 116.5460°W

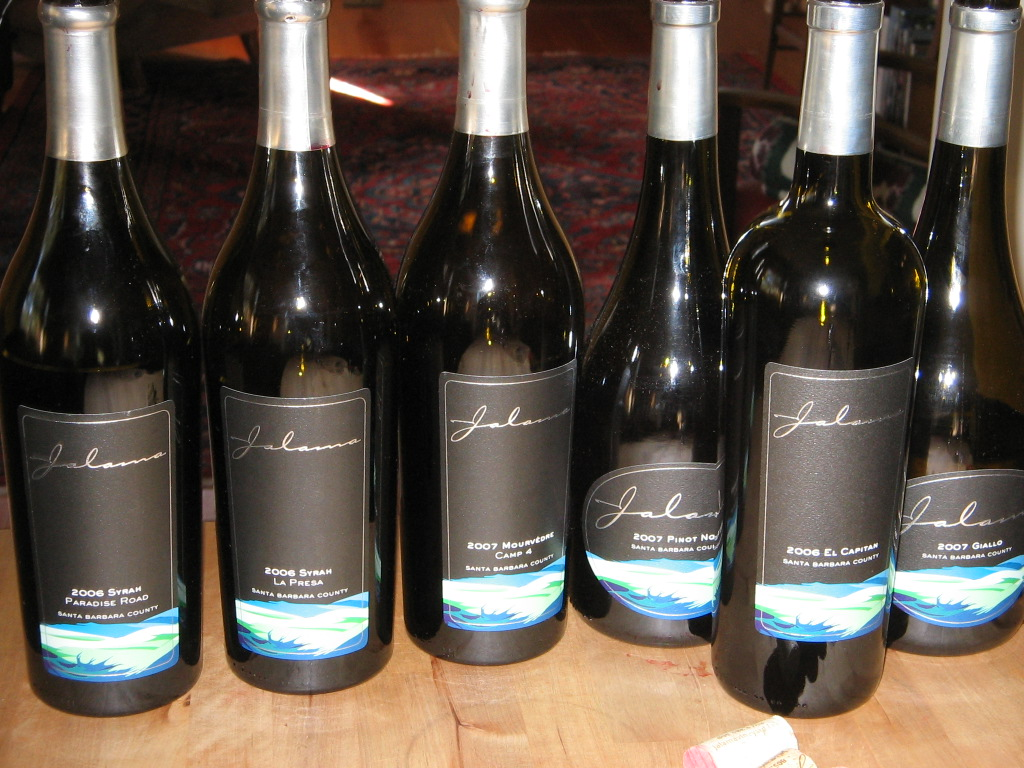
- Location: Lompoc, USA
- Appellation: Central Coast AVA
- Formerly: Jalama Vineyard
- Founded: 2005
- First vintage: 2004
- Key people: Mark Cargasacchi, winemaker
- Cases/yr: 420
- Known for: Giallo; El Capitan Syrah; La Presa Syrah; Paradise Road Syrah; Cargasacchi Pinot noir Camp 4 Mourvèdre
- Varietals: Syrah, Pinot noir, Cabernet Sauvignon, Pinot gris, Mourvèdre
- Distribution: limited
- Website: www.jalamawines.com

Jalama Wines is a California wine estate producing various Rhône style blends and varietal wines. The winery is located in Lompoc, California, 45 minutes north of Santa Barbara and the vineyard, located near Jalama Beach, is the westernmost vineyard in Santa Barbara County. The vineyard is widely known for its hands-on farming techniques.

== History ==
The Jalama valley, formerly part of an old Spanish land grant named Rancho San Julian, sits just a few miles from the Pacific. The area has a rich history of cattle ranching, farming and wine production dating back to the time of the first California missions. A few of the original vines first planted by the natives of La Purisima Misson still remain nearby. Jalama Vineyard is on a portion of the family-owned and operated Cargasacchi ranch which includes the Cargasacchi Vineyard in the Sta. Rita Hills. The westernmost vineyard in Santa Barbara County, Jalama Vineyard is close to Jalama Beach and Point Conception. This unique region is surrounded by the Pacific Ocean on three sides, resulting in foggy nights and cool, breezy days making the area ideal for growing Pinot noir and Pinot gris.

Starting in 1990, wine maker, Mark Cargasacchi consulted for other notable wineries in the Santa Ynez Valley until his estate began bottling the Jalama label in 2004. Jalama wines has made an impact with wine sales through the use of online social media markets.

== Production ==
Within a 450-acre (180 ha) area, the vineyard area extends 11 acres (4.5 ha), planted with varieties Syrah, Pinot noir, Pinot gris and Viognier. Additional grapes Syrah, Cabernet Sauvignon and Mourvèdre are sourced from vineyards located in the Santa Rita Hills.
