= Ballard Elementary School District =

School district in California

Address
- 2425 School Street Solvang, California, 93463; United States

District information
- Type: Public
- Grades: K–6
- NCES District ID: 0603720

Students and staff
- Students: 128 (2020–2021)
- Teachers: 7.0 (FTE)
- Staff: 5.6 (FTE)
- Student–teacher ratio: 18.29:1

Other information
- Website: www.ballardschool.org

Ballard Elementary School District is located in the rural town of Ballard, California, United States, serving residents of the Santa Ynez Valley.

The district was founded in 1882 and was the first school in the valley. There is one school in this district, Ballard Elementary. Ballard Elementary is a Kindergarten through 6th grade school originally built in 1883 as a one-room schoolhouse. The "little red schoolhouse" is still used today by the Kindergarten and 1st grades. 128 students attend this school. Ballard School has become renowned for its quality of instruction, achieving second place among 43 school district results for Santa Barbara County, in the 2006 No Child Left Behind testing program.
