= Los Olivos District AVA =

American Viticultural Area in Santa Barbara County, California, United States

Coordinates: 34°37′46″N 120°05′01″W

Los Olivos District
- Wine region
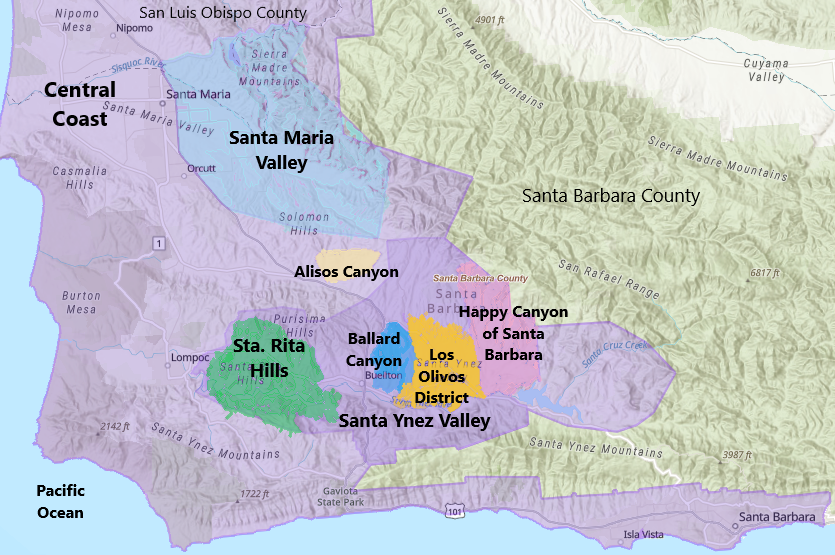
- Type: American Viticultural Area
- Year established: 2016
- Years of wine industry: 57
- Country: United States
- Part of: California, Central Coast AVA, Santa Barbara County, Santa Ynez Valley AVA
- Other regions in California, Central Coast AVA, Santa Barbara County, Santa Ynez Valley AVA: Ballard Canyon AVA, Happy Canyon of Santa Barbara AVA, Sta. Rita Hills AVA
- Growing season: 194 days
- Climate region: Region Ia
- Heat units: 1,563 GDD units
- Precipitation (annual average): above 16.5 in (419.1 mm)
- Soil conditions: Gravelly fine sandy and clay loams derived from alluvium, including Orcutt sand and terrace deposits
- Total area: 22,820 acres (36 sq mi)
- Size of planted vineyards: 1,121 acres (454 ha)
- No. of vineyards: 47
- Grapes produced: Cabernet Sauvignon, Merlot, Pinot Noir, Sauvignon Blanc, Sémillon
- No. of wineries: 48

Los Olivos District is an American Viticultural Area (AVA) located in Santa Barbara County, California. It straddles the Santa Ynez Valley, formed by the Santa Ynez River, between the Purisima Hills above Solvang. The area encompasses the townships of Los Olivos, Ballard, Santa Ynez and Solvang. State Route 154, known locally as the San Marcos Pass Road or "Chumash Highway," bisects the region accessing many of the wineries and vineyards as it traverses toward its destination in Santa Barbara.
It was established as the nation's 232^{nd}, the state's 146^{th} and the county's sixth appellation on January 21, 2016 by the Alcohol and Tobacco Tax and Trade Bureau (TTB), Treasury after reviewing the petition submitted by C. Frederic Brander, owner and winemaker of the Brander Vineyard, on behalf of local vintners and growers, proposing a viticultural area in Santa Barbara County named "Los Olivos District."
The district shares its western boundary with the eastern border of the Ballard Canyon and its eastern boundary flanks the western perimeter of Happy Canyon of Santa Barbara while not overlapping either appellation. It is the fourth sub-appellation designated within the Santa Ynez Valley viticultural area while also located within the vast, multi-county Central Coast viticultural area.
Los Olivos District stretches over 22,820 acres (36 sq mi) where, at the outset, approximately twelve bonded wineries and forty-seven commercially-producing vineyards cultivate 1,120 acres (453 ha) making it the largest concentration of the valley's heritage vineyards. The grapes are principally Sauvignon Blanc, Cabernet Franc, Cabernet Sauvignon, and Rhône varietals take prominence, although the AVA also includes Spanish and Italian varietals.

== History ==
In the late 1800s, Alden March Boyd purchased land in Santa Barbara County and planted a 5,000-tree olive grove he named "Rancho Los Olivos." The community that grew up nearby took the name "Los Olivos," after Boyd's ranch. The Los Olivos District AVA takes its name from the ranch and the town, both of which are located within the boundaries of the AVA. The town and the ranch appear on the USGS Los Olivos quadrangle map. The town of Los Olivos also appears on a road map of Santa Barbara County, published by the American Automobile Association, which was included with the petition. Name evidence for the AVA is supported by the fact that several businesses use the moniker "Los Olivos" in their names, including the Los Olivos Grand Hotel, the Gallery Los Olivos, the Los Olivos Cafe, and the Los Olivos Grocery. Additionally, several public institutions that serve residents within the proposed AVA use the name "Los Olivos," including the Los Olivos Library, the Los Olivos Post Office, and the Los Olivos Elementary School.

The viticultural history of Los Olivos District began with the Spanish Franciscans who came to the Santa Ynez Valley in 1804 and founded the Mission Santa Ynez, on the western edge of the town of Solvang. The four historic townships of Solvang (1804), Ballard (1880), Santa Ynez (1882), and Los Olivos (1887) that lie within the Santa Ynez Valley as described above were later joined by the town of Buellton (1920) to form a larger and politically based Santa Ynez Valley, as it is known today.
Grape vines were planted and small quantities of wine were produced for the Catholic Church. Commercial vineyards came much later with the planting of "Vina de Santa Ynez" by the Bettencourt and Davidge families on Refugio Road in 1969.

== Terroir ==
=== Topography ===
The Los Olivos District AVA is located on the only broad alluvial terrace plain of the Santa Ynez River. The topography of the AVA is relatively uniform, with nearly flat terrain that gently slopes downward to the south. Elevations within the AVA range from approximately 400 feet (122 m) in the southern portion of the AVA, along the Santa Ynez River, to 1,000 feet (305 m) in the northern portion, in the foothills of the San Rafael Mountains. The petition discusses the benefits that the relatively flat, uniform topography of the AVA has for viticulture. The lack of steeply sloped terrain minimizes the risk of erosion, allows vineyard owners more options to space vines and orient rows, and facilitates mechanical harvesting and tilling. The flat, open terrain also allows vineyards within the AVA to receive uniform amounts of sunlight, rainfall, and temperature-moderating fog because there are no significant hills or mountains within the AVA to block the rainfall and fog or to shade the vineyards.
The Los Olivos District is surrounded by higher elevations and mountainous terrain in all directions. To the north are the San Rafael Mountains, with steep slopes and elevations reaching over 2,000 feet (610 m). To the east is the Happy Canyon of Santa Barbara AVA, which is marked by steeper terrain, rolling hills, and canyons. Elevations within the portion of the Happy Canyon of Santa Barbara AVA immediately adjacent to the AVA reach heights of 1,600 feet (488 m). To the south of the AVA are the Santa Ynez Mountains and the Los Padres National Forest, which have elevations reaching over 3,000 feet (914 m) and steep, rugged terrain unsuitable for commercial viticulture. To the west of the AVA is the Ballard Canyon AVA, which has rolling hills, maze-like canyons, and elevations reaching 1,200 feet (366 m).

=== Climate ===
Within the Central Coast AVA, where the Los Olivos District AVA is located, temperatures are affected by cooling marine fog. Locations close to the Pacific Ocean have heavy marine fog, while locations farther inland, such as the AVA, receive less fog. In general, marine fog contributes to cool daytime temperatures and warm nighttime temperatures. Because the Los Olivos District AVA is located about 30 miles (48 km) inland from the Pacific Ocean, much of the marine fog has diminished by the time it reaches the District in the late afternoon. However, enough fog remains to moderate the evening and nighttime temperatures. Due to the flat, open topography, the fog circulates freely throughout the entire AVA. In locations where fog is present throughout most of the day, the difference between the daily high and daily low temperatures (diurnal temperature variation) is usually smaller than in regions where fog is less prevalent because fog lowers the daytime temperatures and warms the nighttime temperatures. The petition table shows the average monthly diurnal temperature variation during the growing season measured at weather stations in the Los Olivos District and in regions to the east and west. Data was not available for locations to the north and south of the AVA. The data shows that the Los Olivos District AVA generally has smaller average monthly diurnal temperature variations than the region farther inland (Cachuma Lake) and greater average monthly variations than the region closer to the coast. Lompoc, which is located only nine miles (14 km) from the Pacific Ocean, has smaller average monthly diurnal temperature variations than the AVA because the marine fog is heavy throughout the entire day, keeping daytime highs cool and allowing for only small drops in nighttime temperatures. From May through September, Cachuma Lake has greater average monthly diurnal temperature variations than the AVA because the lake is farther from the ocean, approximately 36 miles (58 km). The marine fog has largely dissipated by the time it reaches Cachuma Lake, allowing daytime temperatures to rise higher and nighttime temperatures to drop lower than within the AVA. During April and October, fog is lighter and occurs less frequently within the AVA, so the diurnal temperature variations within the AVA are similar to those at Cachuma Lake. The Ballard Canyon AVA is closer to the ocean than the AVA, but the hills and canyons block much of the fog from entering the Ballard Canyon AVA. As a result, the Ballard Canyon AVA has generally greater diurnal temperature variations than the proposed Los Olivos District AVA. According to the petition, diurnal temperature variations during the growing season affect viticulture. Warm daytime temperatures encourage fruit maturation and sugar production, and cool nighttime temperatures minimize acid loss. Therefore, grapes in regions with large diurnal temperature variations ripen faster and have higher levels of sugar and acid than regions with smaller diurnal temperature variations. Additionally, because regions with large diurnal temperature variations generally have less fog, grapes in those regions are not at as great a risk of mildew or fungal diseases as areas with heavier fog and smaller diurnal temperature variations. The petition also included a summary of growing degree day (GDD) data 5 gathered during the 2007–2012 growing seasons for the Los Olivos District AVA and the regions to the north, east, and west. Data was not available for the region to the south. The data shows that the Los Olivos District AVA has more growing degree days than the region to the immediate west and fewer than the regions to the north and east. According to the petition, GDD accumulation influences the grape varietals grown in a region. Warm regions typically grow Bordeaux and Rhone varietals, such as Cabernet Sauvignon and Syrah, both of which are commonly grown within the AVA. Additionally, warm temperatures promote vigorous vine growth and large leaf canopies, which affect decisions on row spacing, trellis design, pruning, and canopy management. The USDA plant hardiness zone range is 9a to 10a.

=== Soil ===
Over 95 percent of the soils within the Los Olivos District AVA are from the Positas-Ballard-Santa Ynez soil association and are derived from alluvium, including Orcutt sand and terrace deposits. The soils are moderately to well-drained gravelly fine sandy loams and clay loams with low to moderate fertility. According to the petition, the soils found in the Los Olivos District are well-suited for viticulture. The soils drain well enough that the vines are not susceptible to root disease and chlorosis but do not drain so excessively as to require frequent irrigation. Soil nutrient levels within the AVA are adequate to produce healthy vines and fruit without promoting excessive growth. Finally, the uniformity of the soils throughout the Los Olivos District AVA results in a greater consistency in growing conditions for vineyards than is found in regions with greater soil variations. To the north of the Los Olivos District AVA, within the San Rafael Mountains, approximately 95 percent of the soils are of the Chamise-Arnold-Crow Hill association, which is described as well-drained to excessively drained and very low to moderately fertile. To the east and south of the AVA, the soils are more diverse. Within the Happy Canyon of Santa Barbara AVA, to the east of the AVA, approximately 40 percent of the soils are from the Positas-Ballard-Santa Ynez association. The remaining 60 percent of the soils are from the Chamise-Arnold-Crow Hill, the Shedd-Santa Lucia-Diablo, and the Toomes-Climara associations, which are all well-drained to excessively drained and range from very low to highly fertile. To the south of the AVA, within the Santa Ynez Mountains, approximately 60 percent of the soils are from the Los Osos-Gaviota association, which is described as well-drained to excessively drained and very low to moderately fertile. The remaining 40 percent of the soils is a combination of soils from Shedd-Santa Lucia-Diablo association and sedimentary rock that is not suitable for viticulture. To the west, within the Ballard Canyon AVA, approximately 95 percent of the soils are from the Chamise-Arnold-Crow Hill association, which are characterized as being well-drained to excessively drained and having very low to moderately low fertility.
