= Ballard Canyon AVA =

American Viticultural Area in Santa Barbara County, California, United States

Coordinates: 34°38′01″N 120°07′14″W

Ballard Canyon
- Wine region
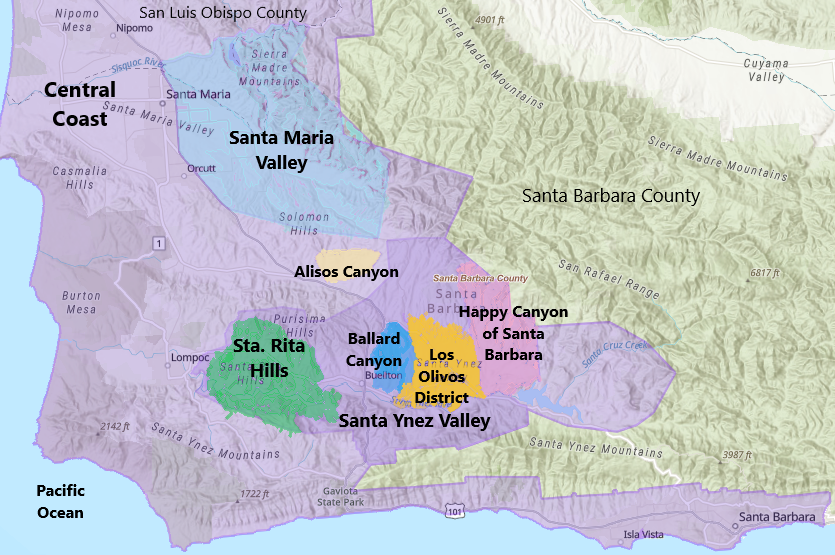
- Type: American Viticultural Area
- Year established: 2013
- Country: United States
- Part of: California, Central Coast AVA, Santa Barbara County, Santa Ynez Valley AVA
- Other regions in California, Central Coast AVA, Santa Barbara County, Santa Ynez Valley AVA: Happy Canyon of Santa Barbara AVA, Los Olivos District AVA, Sta. Rita Hills AVA
- Growing season: 194 days
- Climate region: Region II
- Heat units: 2916.58 GDD units
- Soil conditions: Limestone, fine sand and clay loam
- Total area: 7,800 acres (12 sq mi)
- Size of planted vineyards: 565 acres (229 ha)
- No. of vineyards: 19
- Grapes produced: Cabernet Sauvignon, Cabernet Franc, Cinsault, Counoise, Grenache, Grenache Blanc, Malvasia Bianca, Marsanne, Merlot, Mourvedre, Nebbiolo, Petit Verdot, Petite Sirah, Roussanne, Sangiovese, Sauvignon Blanc, Semillon, Syrah, Tempranillo, Viognier, Zinfandel
- No. of wineries: 2

Ballard Canyon is an American Viticultural Area (AVA) located in Santa Barbara County, California within the Santa Ynez Valley landform. The wine appellation was established as the nation's 209^{th}, the state's 126^{th} and the county's fifth AVA on October 2, 2013 by the Alcohol and Tobacco Tax and Trade Bureau (TTB), Treasury after reviewing the petition submitted by Wesley D. Hagen, Viticulturist and Winemaker, on behalf of local vineyard owners and winemakers, proposing a viticultural area in Santa Barbara County named "'Ballard Canyon."

The 7,800-acre (12 sq mi) designated area encompasses the Ballard Canyon landform located in the center of the Santa Ynez Valley viticultural area between Los Olivos, Ballard and Solvang on its eastern boundary, and U.S. 101 to the west. It also lies within the boundaries of the vast multi-county Central Coast viticultural area. As of 2025, Santa Ynez Valley contains three other established viticultural areas: Sta. Rita Hills, to the west; Los Olivos District and Happy Canyon of Santa Barbara to the east. Los Olivos District borders Ballard Canyon's eastern perimeter while Sta. Rita Hills and the Happy Canyon areas do not share boundaries nor overlap Ballard Canyon. The USDA plant hardiness zone range is 9a to 10a.

== History ==
The history of Ballard Canyon extends back to the Spanish Land Grants and the integration of emigrating Danish-Americans into the 19th Century Santa Ynez Valley, and is associated with areas historically known as Buellton, Santa Ynez Valley, and the original Rancho San Carlos de Jonata Land Grant which was bestowed upon Joaquin Carrillo and Jose Maria Covarrubias by Governor Pio Pico in 1845. This land grant consisted of 26,634 acres (42 sq mi) which include present day Buellton and Solvang.

The name of Ballard Canyon is derived from Ballard township which is the oldest of the Santa Ynez Valley villages, and began as a stagecoach station known as "Alamo Pintado" because a splendid "painted cottonwood tree was a landmark there. It was one of the trees painted with ceremonial marks and signs. William N. Ballard came to the Santa Ynez Valley in 1858 and acquired 640 acres (259 ha) of land along Alamo Pintado Creek. Anticipating the development of the Coast Line Stage through Gaviota Pass, his objective was to establish a stage-coach stop to provide meals for passengers and a change of horses. Other stations were being established at Foxen's in Foxen Canyon, Dana's in Nipomo and southward at Las Cruces. William N. Ballard was superintendent of the Butterfield Overland Mail Company stage station from 1862-1870. The station, then known as “Ballard’s Station” or “Alamo Pintado Station,” operated from 1860 until at least 1880, providing the first passenger travel and mail delivery between San Luis Obispo and Santa Barbara. The Ballard adobe house is still standing. Ballard died there in 1871, and his widow married George W. Lewis, the Alamo Pintado Rancho landholder. In 1881 Lewis optimistically laid out a town and named it Ballard in honor of his old friend and the first husband of his wife." The boundaries of Ballard Canyon AVA are contained within the original San Carlos de Jonata Land Grant, which has been recognized as quality potential vineyard land since the late nineteenth century.

== Terroir ==
=== Topography ===
The distinguishing features of the Ballard Canyon viticultural area include wind, temperature and soils. The viticultural area consists of steep north-south ranging slopes and maze-like canyons, with Ballard Canyon forming a crescent within the eastern portion. Elevations range from 400 feet (122 m) at the southernmost portion of the Ballard Canyon to approximately 1,200 feet (366 m) within the northernmost region. The boundary also encompasses the majority of the Alisal Creek-Santa Ynez River watershed. The boundary follows a series of elevation contours and straight lines between points marked on the relevant USGS maps. A combination of the 1,000-foot (305 m) elevation contour line and a series of straight lines between points defines the northern portion of the boundary and approximately follows the northernmost edge of Ballard Canyon. The area to the north of the viticultural area contains maze-like canyons and north-south ranges similar to those within the Ballard Canyon viticultural area but generally has higher elevations and is more exposed to the cooling marine influence and strong breezes that travel from the Pacific Ocean through the adjacent Santa Maria Valley. The eastern portion of the boundary includes the eastern edge of Ballard Canyon and separates the canyonlands from the lower, flatter Los Olivos basin and Santa Ynez Valley, which lie to the immediate east and northeast of the Ballard Canyon viticultural area. Elevations in this region range from 600 feet (183 m) in the Santa Ynez Valley to 880 feet (268 m) near Los Olivos. The southern portion of the boundary follows the 400-foot (122 m) elevation contour line, which separates the lower, flatter land near the Santa Ynez River from the higher, more rugged canyonlands located within the Ballard Canyon viticultural area. The elevations south of the viticultural area are lower than within the viticultural area, with elevations ranging from 280 feet (85 m) along the Santa Ynez River to 400 feet (122 m) near the southernmost portion of the Ballard Canyon viticultural area boundary line. The western portion of the boundary follows the 600-foot (183 m) elevation contour line and several straight lines drawn between points to encompass the Alisal Creek-Santa Ynez River watershed. The western portion of the boundary separates the north-south ranges within the Ballard Canyon viticultural area from the east-west ranges to the west. The east-west orientation of the hills and canyons to the west of the Ballard Canyon viticultural area allows more of the cooling marine influence to travel from the Pacific Ocean into this area, bringing stronger breezes, cooler daytime temperatures, and warmer nighttime temperatures than within the Ballard Canyon viticultural area.

=== Climate ===
==== Wind ====
To the west of the Ballard Canyon viticultural area are the Purisima, Santa Rita, and Santa Rosa Hills. These mountain ranges run west to east from Lompoc to Buellton and form a "throat" that allows winds from the Pacific Ocean to flow into the Santa Ynez Valley through the Sta. Rita Hills viticultural area. However, just east of the Sta. Rita Hills viticultural area and just west of the Ballard Canyon viticultural area, the mountains are aligned in a north-south orientation. These north-south mountains shelter the Ballard Canyon viticultural area from the strongest winds blowing from the west and the worst effects of these maritime influences.
The petition provides a summary of average monthly wind and gust speeds in miles per hour (mph) from within the Ballard Canyon viticultural area, as well as from areas to the north (Foxen Canyon), to the east (Happy Canyon of Santa Barbara viticultural area), to the south (Solvang), and to the west (Sta. Rita Hills viticultural area) of the viticultural area. Data was collected from weather stations within the various locations from 2005 through 2009. Winds were measured each year from April through October, which is the grape growing season. The petition also notes that July, August, and September are the critical ripening months for vineyards in the Central Coast region of California, when climate can most affect grape production. The average growing season wind and gust speeds are lower within the Ballard Canyon viticultural area than in the surrounding areas, with significant differences in wind and gust speeds evident from those in Sta. Rita Hills viticultural area to the west and Foxen Canyon to the north. The petition attributes the lower wind speeds within the Ballard Canyon viticultural area to the north-south mountain ranges that block the stronger winds from the Pacific Ocean. The east-west coastal "throat" that funnels winds inland from the Pacific Ocean lies in the heart of the Sta. Rita Hills viticultural area and brings the strongest winds into that region. Foxen Canyon has north-south ranges similar to the viticultural area; however, the adjacent Santa Maria Valley to the north channels more of the Pacific Ocean winds into the Foxen Canyon region. According to the petition, low wind and gust speeds have a positive effect on viticulture within the Ballard Canyon viticultural area. Fog flows in from the coast in the early hours of the morning and retreat again in the afternoon. The vines in the south of Ballard Canyon are exposed to the fog for a longer period of time compared to those planted at the higher elevations in the AVA's northern vineyards. These factors, in combination with high diurnal temperature variations of approximately 40 °F (4 °C), slows the ripening process enough that acidity levels are not compromised. The wines produced are therefore balanced and fresh.
Constant winds and strong gusts cause the stomas on the leaves to close to prevent moisture loss; this reduces a vine’s ability to photosynthesize efficiently, resulting in less energy and food for the vine. By contrast, a lack of persistently strong winds or gusts allows the stomas to stay open and the grapevines to photosynthesize more efficiently. As a result, the grapes are able to achieve high phenolic ripeness, the peak concentration of compounds (phenols) within the skin, seeds, stems, and pulp of the grape which contribute to the color, flavor, and aroma of the wine.

==== Temperature ====
The north-south mountain ranges of the Ballard Canyon viticultural area shelter the viticultural area from the marine influence that affects the areas to the west, north and south. As a result, the temperatures within the Ballard Canyon viticultural area are generally warmer during the day and cooler at night than the areas to the west, north and south. The area to the east of the Ballard Canyon viticultural area, however, is significantly warmer due to a lower marine influence resulting from its more inland location. The petition provides a summary of high and low temperatures and growing degree day (GDD) 1 data gathered during the growing season (April through October) from 2005 through 2009. The petition also addresses the impact of the variation in temperature between the daytime high and nighttime low (diurnal shift) on viticulture within the viticultural area, but did not calculate the shift. TTB calculated the diurnal shifts and included the information in a petition table. The data represent points located within the Ballard Canyon viticultural area, as well as points to the north, east, south, and west of the viticultural area. The data in the table show that the most significant difference in GDD units exists between the viticultural area and the Sta. Rita Hills viticultural area to the west, where the cooling marine influence results in 25 percent fewer GDD units than within the viticultural area. The high GDD unit accumulation within the Ballard Canyon viticultural area indicates that the growing season temperatures rise far enough above the key 50 °F (10 °C) mark to allow adequate time for grapes to develop and ripen fully. Heat accumulation strongly influences varietal planting decisions, making the viticultural area particularly suited to warm-weather grape varieties such as Syrah, which is the primary grape variety grown in the viticultural area. The data in the table also show that the Ballard Canyon viticultural area has warmer days and cooler nights during the growing season than most of the surrounding area, which results in large diurnal shifts. The most significant differences in diurnal shifts are between the viticultural area and Foxen Canyon to the north, Solvang to the south, and the Sta. Rita Hills viticultural area to the east, the differences being more pronounced during the peak growing season. According to the petition, large diurnal shifts like those found within the viticultural area produce desirably high levels of sugar and acid in grapes because the daytime heat increases sugar production and the nighttime cooling reduces acid loss.

=== Soils ===
The soils in the Ballard Canyon AVA are more uniform than in the larger Santa Ynez Valley viticultural area. They are made up of sand and clay loam with good drainage capacities. More than 95 percent of the acreage within the Ballard Canyon viticultural area contains a unified soil association called the Chamise-Arnold-Crow Hill association. This soil group is defined as gently sloping to very steep, with well drained to somewhat excessively drained sands as well as clay loams on high terraces and uplands. A very small portion of the southern end of the Ballard Canyon viticultural area contains the Positas-Ballard-Santa Ynez association and the Sorrento-Mocho-Camarillo association. The Positas-Ballard-Santa Ynez association is described in the Santa Barbara area soil map as being nearly level to moderately steep, with well drained and moderately well drained fine sandy loams to clay loams on terraces. The same soil map describes the Sorrento-Mocho-Camarillo association as nearly level to moderately sloping, with well drained to somewhatpoorly drained sandy loams to silty clay loams on flood plains and alluvial fans. The soils of most of the area immediately adjacent to the Ballard Canyon viticultural area are a continuation of the associations found within the viticultural area, but they transition to other dominant soil types. To the north of the viticultural area, the soils transition from the Chamise-Arnold-Crow Hill association to Shedd-Santa Lucia-Diablo and Toomes-Climara associations near the San Rafael Mountains. To the east and south of the viticultural area, the soils begin as the Positas-Ballard-Santa Ynez association and transition to the Toomes-Climara and Shedd-Santa Lucia-Diablo associations. To the southwest, the soils are of the Sorrento-Mocho-Camarillo and Positas-Ballard-Santa Ynez associations near the boundary of the viticultural area and change to Shedd-Santa Lucia-Diablo farther south near the Santa Ynez Mountains. To the west, the soils begin as a continuation of the Chamise-Arnold-Crow Hill and Sorrento-Mocho- Camarillo associations and change to the Marina-Oceano association nearer to the Pacific Ocean. The soil structure, pH values, and mineral levels of the viticultural area also differ from that of the areas to the east and west. Information on these factors was not available concerning areas to the north and south of the viticultural area. An analysis of soils from four vineyards within the viticultural area indicates the soil profile is consistently a layer of loam on top of a layer of clay, which in turn is on a second layer of loam. By contrast, soils of the Sta. Rita Hills viticultural area, to the west, contain more sand, and soils of the Happy Canyon of Santa Barbara viticultural area, to the east, contain more clay. The soil analysis of the four vineyards within the Ballard Canyon viticultural area reveals a wide range of soil pH values. Soil pH values affect the ability of grapevines to uptake nutrients, and the analysis notes that the desired pH range for viticulture is 6.5 to 7.5. Moderately acidic soils reduce the ability of the vines to uptake nutrients, resulting in less vigorous vine and leaf growth and the production of berries that have high concentrations of desirable flavors, sugars, and acids. The pH values within the viticultural area range from 5.5 (moderately acidic) to 7.5 (slightly alkaline), with the more acidic soils appearing in the surface portions of the samples and the neutral and alkaline soils appearing at greater depths, where most root activity takes place. By contrast, soil pH values in the Happy Canyon of Santa Barbara viticultural area, to the east, are consistently alkaline (7.25). Soil pH values for the Sta. Rita Hills, to the west, are slightly acidic, with values from 6.1 to 6.7. With regard to mineral levels within the soils, the analysis reveals that nitrogen levels within the viticultural area are between 1.5 and 13 ppm, with the most common total being 5 ppm. Nitrogen levels in the soils to the west, within the Sta. Rita Hills viticultural area, are also very low. By contrast, to the east, within the Happy Canyon of Santa Barbara viticultural area, nitrogen levels in the soil are very high, with levels two to three times higher than recommended for viticulture, which requires growers to ameliorate their soils in order to achieve a lower, more desirable nitrogen level. The petition notes that the optimal nitrogen level for viticulture is between 4 and 8 ppm, and that low levels of nitrogen in the soil, such as those commonly found within the viticultural area, result in lower vine vigor, smaller berries, and more intensity in the resulting wines. Potassium levels within the soils of the viticultural area are described as moderately deficient, with levels varying from 70 to 220 ppm and most soil samples having a range from 120 to 160 ppm. The analysis notes the optimal soil potassium level for grape-growing is between 100 to 500 ppm, as this level is sufficient to provide protein synthesis support, but is low enough to prevent overly vigorous vine growth. By contrast, the Sta. Rita Hills viticultural area has soils that are highly deficient in potassium, with levels as low as 1 ppm in some soils, mostly due to the sandy nature of the soils. Potassium levels in the soils of the Happy Canyon of Santa Barbara viticultural area are higher than those of the Ballard Canyon viticultural area, with average soil levels of 200 ppm.
Finally, exchangeable levels of calcium in the soils within the Ballard Canyon viticultural area are between 1,000 and 1,400 ppm, within the range generally preferred for viticulture. Limestone is also present in certain northern vineyard plots. Vines planted in the steeper vineyard sites are able to develop deep root systems in search of water in the area's arid environment, thereby increasing vine strength.
According to the petition, calcium affects the thickness of grape skins, with high levels producing thicker skins, lower juice-to-skin ratios during ferment, and wines of deeper color and richness. The soils of the Sta. Rita Hills viticultural area to the west contain higher levels of calcium than the Ballard Canyon viticultural area, around 1,220 ppm, but the lower amounts of clay in the soil in that region limit the ability of the vines to uptake the calcium. The soils of the Happy Canyon of Santa Barbara viticultural area to the east contain calcium levels up to ten times higher than those of the Ballard Canyon viticultural area and also have high clay levels, enabling an efficient transfer of calcium to the vines. A good level of calcium ensures the development of thick skins and increases the concentration of tannins, sugars and acids in the grapes. This helps to produce richly flavored, well-balanced wines.

== Viticulture ==
"Ballard Canyon" has been associated with wine production in the area since it first appeared on a bottle of wine in the late 1970's and early 1980's. In April 2011, TTB received a petition from Wesley D. Hagen, a vineyard manager and winemaker, on behalf of 26 other vintners and grape growers in the Ballard Canyon area which has long been highly regarded for its red wines made from Syrah and Grenache. At the ouset, the viticultural area contained ten commercially producing vineyards cultivating approximately 565 acres (229 ha) with Syrah being the primary varietal.
