= Ballard, California =

- unincorporated community census-designated place
- Location of Ballard in Santa Barbara County, California.

- Position in California.
- Coordinates: 34°38′04″N 120°06′56″W
- Country: United States
- State: California
- County: Santa Barbara
- Established: 1880

Area
  - Total: 2.80 sq mi (7.25 km^{2})
  - Land: 2.80 sq mi (7.24 km^{2})
  - Water: 0.0039 sq mi (0.01 km^{2}) 0.02%
- Elevation: 646 ft (197 m)

Population (2020)
  - Total: 768
  - Density: 274.8/sq mi (106.12/km^{2})
- Time zone: UTC-8 (Pacific (PST))
  - Summer (DST): UTC-7 (PDT)
- ZIP Code: 93463
- Area code: 805
- GNIS feature ID: 2582938

Ballard is an unincorporated community in Santa Barbara County, California, United States. Ballard is the smallest and oldest community in the Santa Ynez Valley. The nearest city is Solvang. The population was 768 at the 2020 census. For statistical purposes, the United States Census Bureau has defined that community as a census-designated place (CDP). Ballard was founded in 1880 and has two buildings from that era: the 1883 Ballard School and the Santa Ynez Valley Presbyterian Church, which was erected in 1889.

== Geography ==
Ballard is a small, mostly residential town in the Santa Ynez Valley, which is in the center of Santa Barbara County, California. It is one of six towns in the valley, along with Buellton to the west, Los Alamos to the northwest, Los Olivos to the north, Santa Ynez to the southeast, and Solvang to the south. The town is located next to Ballard Canyon. Ballard is accessible by taking Alamo Pintado Road south from Los Olivos, which is located on California State Route 154, or by taking Alamo Pintado north from Solvang, which is located on State Route 246. From Alamo Pintado, Baseline Avenue is used to enter the main part of town. Baseline Avenue is also accessible directly from State Route 154.

In 1987, Michelle Grimm and Tom Grimm wrote in the Los Angeles Times that Ballard was often visited by "city folks [who] stop by to enjoy the tranquillity of a small town from bygone times." In 2012, the Santa Barbara Independent said the town "still has a 19th-century feel." The town's school is Ballard School, which serves grades K-6. It is famous for its one-room schoolhouse, named the "Little Red Schoolhouse". Some of Ballard's most important businesses and community locations include the Ballard Inn bed & breakfast, the Bob's Well Bread bakery, the Loper Chapel used mainly for funeral services, and the Oak Hill Cemetery. The Santa Ynez Valley's climate is useful for winemaking. The Ballard Canyon AVA produces Rhône and Bordeaux wines.

According to the United States Census Bureau, the CDP covers an area of 2.8 square miles (7.2 km^{2}), of which 99.98% is land, and 0.02% is water.

== History ==
Ballard was founded in 1880 at the location of a Wells Fargo stage line station, being named by George Lewis after William Ballard, the former proprietor, who ran the station from 1862 to 1870. In 1882 it was believed that Ballard would grow into the central metropolis of Santa Barbara County. The first school, Ballard's Little Red School House, was built in 1882 and is still in operation today, being the primary tourist attraction.

The wine-producing region around Ballard was featured in the Academy Award-nominated film Sideways.

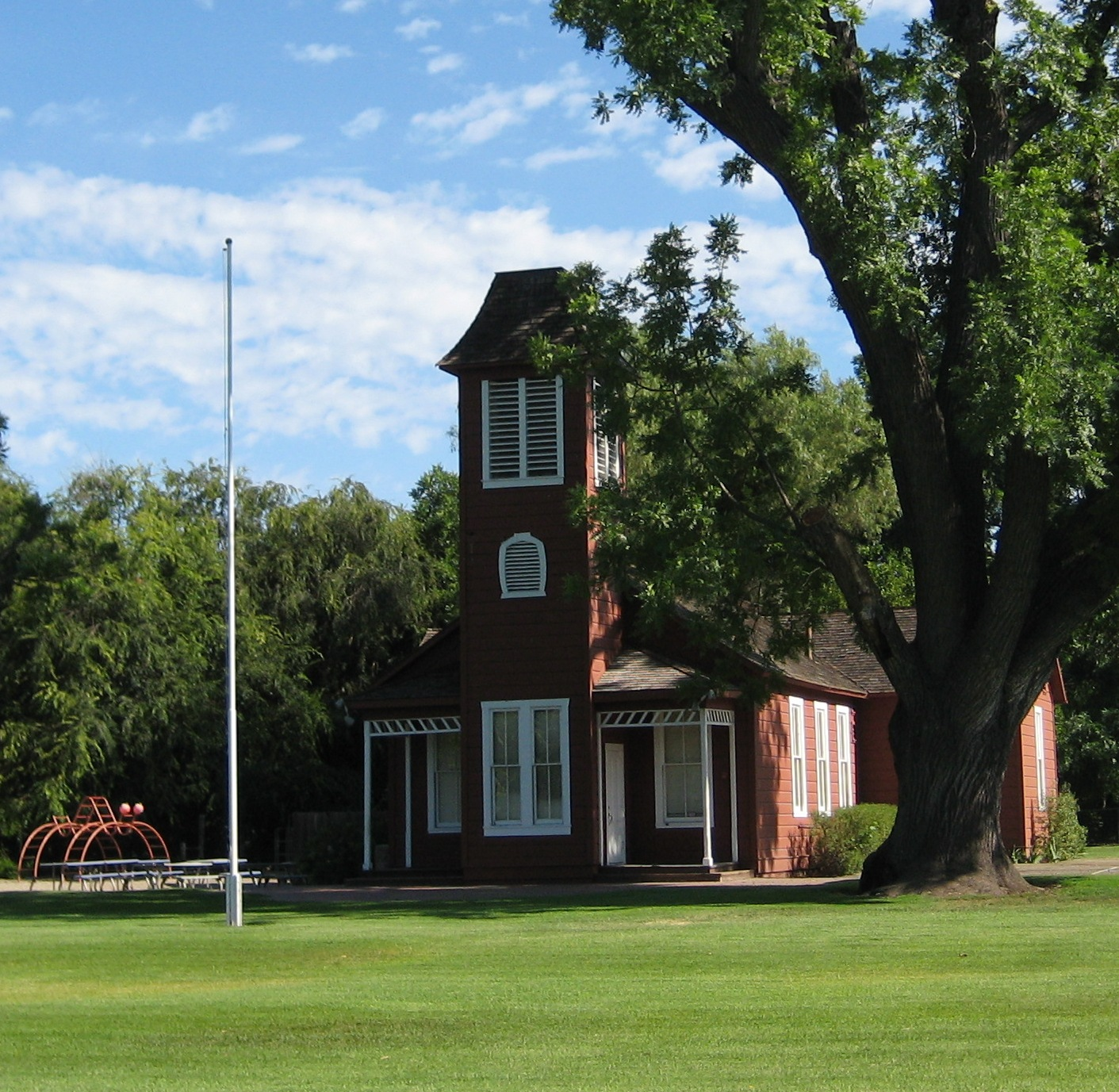
Ballard School in 2011

== Demographics ==
Historical population
Census	Pop.	Note	%±
2010	467		—
2020	768		64.5%
U.S. Decennial Census; 1860–1870 1880-1890; 1900 1910 1920; 1930 1940 1950; 1960 1970 1980; 1990 2000 2010; 2020

Ballard first appeared as a census designated place in the 2010 U.S. census formed from part of the Santa Ynez CDP and additional area.

=== Racial and ethnic composition ===
Ballard CDP, California – Racial and ethnic composition Note: the US Census treats Hispanic/Latino as an ethnic category. This table excludes Latinos from the racial categories and assigns them to a separate category. Hispanics/Latinos may be of any race.
Race / Ethnicity (NH = Non-Hispanic)	Pop 2010	Pop 2020	% 2010	% 2020
White alone (NH)	402	568	86.08%	73.96%
Black or African American alone (NH)	3	8	0.64%	1.04%
Native American or Alaska Native alone (NH)	0	2	0.00%	0.26%
Asian alone (NH)	2	4	0.43%	0.52%
Native Hawaiian or Pacific Islander alone (NH)	0	2	0.00%	0.26%
Other race alone (NH)	1	4	0.21%	0.52%
Mixed race or Multiracial (NH)	13	26	2.78%	3.39%
Hispanic or Latino (any race)	46	154	9.85%	20.05%
Total	467	768	100.00%	100.00%

=== 2020 census ===
As of the 2020 census, Ballard had a population of 768. The population density was 274.9 inhabitants per square mile (106.1/km^{2}). 0.0% of residents lived in urban areas, while 100.0% lived in rural areas.

The median age was 52.4 years. The age distribution was 15.8% under the age of 18, 5.6% aged 18 to 24, 21.2% aged 25 to 44, 29.6% aged 45 to 64, and 27.9% who were 65 years of age or older. For every 100 females there were 102.6 males, and for every 100 females age 18 and over there were 96.7 males age 18 and over.

The whole population lived in households. There were 304 households, of which 25.7% had children under the age of 18 living in them. Of all households, 50.3% were married-couple households, 5.9% were cohabiting couple households, 13.5% were households with a male householder and no spouse or partner present, and 30.3% were households with a female householder and no spouse or partner present. About 30.9% of all households were made up of individuals and 18.7% had someone living alone who was 65 years of age or older. The average household size was 2.53. There were 189 families (62.2% of all households).

There were 347 housing units at an average density of 124.2 units per square mile (48.0 units/km^{2}), of which 304 (87.6%) were occupied. Of these, 68.4% were owner-occupied, and 31.6% were occupied by renters. The homeowner vacancy rate was 0.5% and the rental vacancy rate was 0.0%.
