= Santa Rosa Hills =

Santa Rosa Hills may refer to:

- Santa Rosa Hills (Inyo County) in California, USA
- Santa Rosa Hills (Riverside County) in California, USA
- Santa Rosa Hills (Santa Barbara County) in California, USA

Other similar names include:

- Santa Rosa Mountains (disambiguation)
- Santa Rosa Range in Nevada, USA
- Rose Hills
