= Al-Jalama =

Al-Jalama may refer to:

- al-Jalamah, Syria, a Syrian village in Hama Governorate
- Jalamah, a Palestinian village in Jenin Governorate
- Al-Jalama, Haifa, a depopulated Palestinian village southeast of Haifa
- Al-Jalama, Tulkarm, a depopulated Palestinian village in the Tulkarm Subdistrict
