= Santa Ynez Valley AVA =

American Viticultural Area in Santa Barbara County, California, United States

Coordinates: 34°35′19″N 120°06′13″W

Santa Ynez Valley
- Wine region
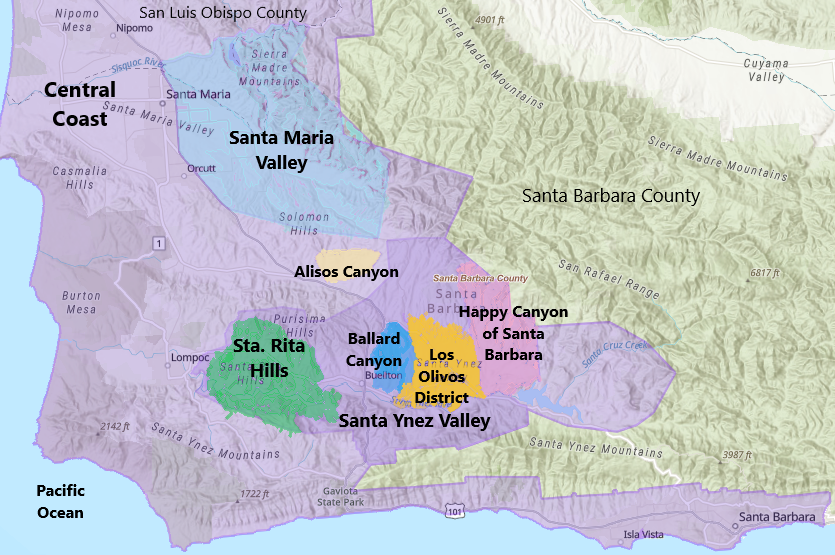
- Type: American Viticultural Area
- Year established: 1983
- Country: United States
- Part of: California, Central Coast AVA, Santa Barbara County
- Other regions in California, Central Coast AVA, Santa Barbara County: Alisos Canyon AVA, Santa Maria Valley AVA
- Sub-regions: Happy Canyon of Santa Barbara AVA, Sta. Rita Hills AVA, Ballard Canyon AVA, Los Olivos District AVA
- Growing season: 309 days
- Climate region: Region I-II
- Heat units: 1970-2820 GDD units
- Precipitation (annual average): 16 in (410 mm)
- Soil conditions: sand and clay loams on gentle to very steep slopes on high terraces and uplands. Upper elevations have steep, well-drained shaly clay and silty clay loams
- Total area: 182,400 acres (285 sq mi)
- Size of planted vineyards: 1,200 acres (490 ha)
- No. of vineyards: 40
- Grapes produced: Albarino, Arneis, Cabernet Franc, Cabernet Sauvignon, Chardonnay, Cinsault, Counoise, Grenache, Grenache Blanc, Lagrein, Malbec, Malvasia, Marsanne, Merlot, Mourvedre, Muscat Canelli, Nebbiolo, Negrette, Petit Verdot, Pinot Blanc, Pinot Gris, Pinot Noir, Riesling, Roussanne, Sangiovese, Sauvignon Blanc, Semillon, Syrah, Tempranillo, Tocai Friulano, Viognier, Zinfandel
- No. of wineries: 105

Santa Ynez Valley is an American Viticultural Area (AVA) located in Santa Barbara County, California within the Santa Ynez Valley landform surrounding the Santa Ynez River. The wine appellation was established as the nation's 32^{nd}, the state's 20^{th} and the county's second AVA on May 15, 1983 by the Bureau of Alcohol, Tobacco and Firearms (ATF), Treasury after reviewing the petition submitted by Firestone Vineyard, a bounded winery in Los Olivos, California, proposing a viticultural area in Santa Barbara County to be known as "Santa Ynez Valley."

The viticultural area lies within the vast multi-county Central Coast AVA encompassing 182,400 acres (285 sq mi) containing 1,200 acres (490 ha) of vineyards and the greatest concentration of wineries in Santa Barbara County. The valley is formed by the Purisima Hills and San Rafael Mountains to the north and the Santa Ynez Mountains to the south creating a long, east-west corridor with very cool temperatures on the coast that become progressively warmer inland. The Santa Ynez River flows east to west on the valley floor toward the Pacific Ocean. As of 2025, the Santa Ynez Valley contains four sub-appellations Sta. Rita Hills on its western boundary; Ballard Canyon and Los Olivos District occupying the center region; and Happy Canyon on the eastern border. Chardonnay is the most planted grape variety in the cooler, western portion of the valley while Rhône varieties thrive in the eastern locales. The USDA plant hardiness zones zone range from 9a to 10b.

== History ==
The name "Santa Ynez" (Spanish pronunciation: [/iːˈnɛz/] EE-nez) was given to the Mission Santa Inés, a Spanish mission in present-day Solvang, established in 1804 by Father Estévan Tapís of the Franciscan order. The mission site was chosen as a midway point between Mission Santa Barbara and Mission La Purísima Concepción, and was designed to relieve overcrowding at those two missions and to serve the Indians living north of the Coast Range. The mission was dedicated to Saint Agnes, and the Santa Ynez name was applied to the town, river, and valley.
Grape-growing and winemaking were extensive in Santa Barbara County prior to Prohibition. The Santa Ynez Valley itself contained over 5,000 acres (2,023 ha) of vineyards. However, Prohibition ended the industry in the valley, and vineyards were not replanted after the Repeal. In 1969, the first commercial vineyards since Prohibition were planted just east of Solvang, along Refugio Road at the site of the Collage Ranch which was part of an original Spanish land grant.The vineyard was named Viña de Santa Ynez. In 1976, the Santa Ynez Valley Winery was established at the vineyard. Additional acreage was planted during the next decade, esecially 1972-1973, by winemakers attracted to the climate of the valley, and its remoteness from urban encroachment. At the outset, there were over 20 vineyards encompassing 1,200 acres (486 ha) within the viticultural area, and eight bonded wineries have been established. Major grape varietals include Cabernet Sauvignon, Riesling, Chardonnay, Merlot, Sauvignon Blanc, Gewurztraminer, and Pinot Noir. Commercial production of Santa Ynez Valley wines began in the mid 1970's, and the Santa Ynez Valley, California appellation currently appears on may labels of wines from the region.

== Terroir ==
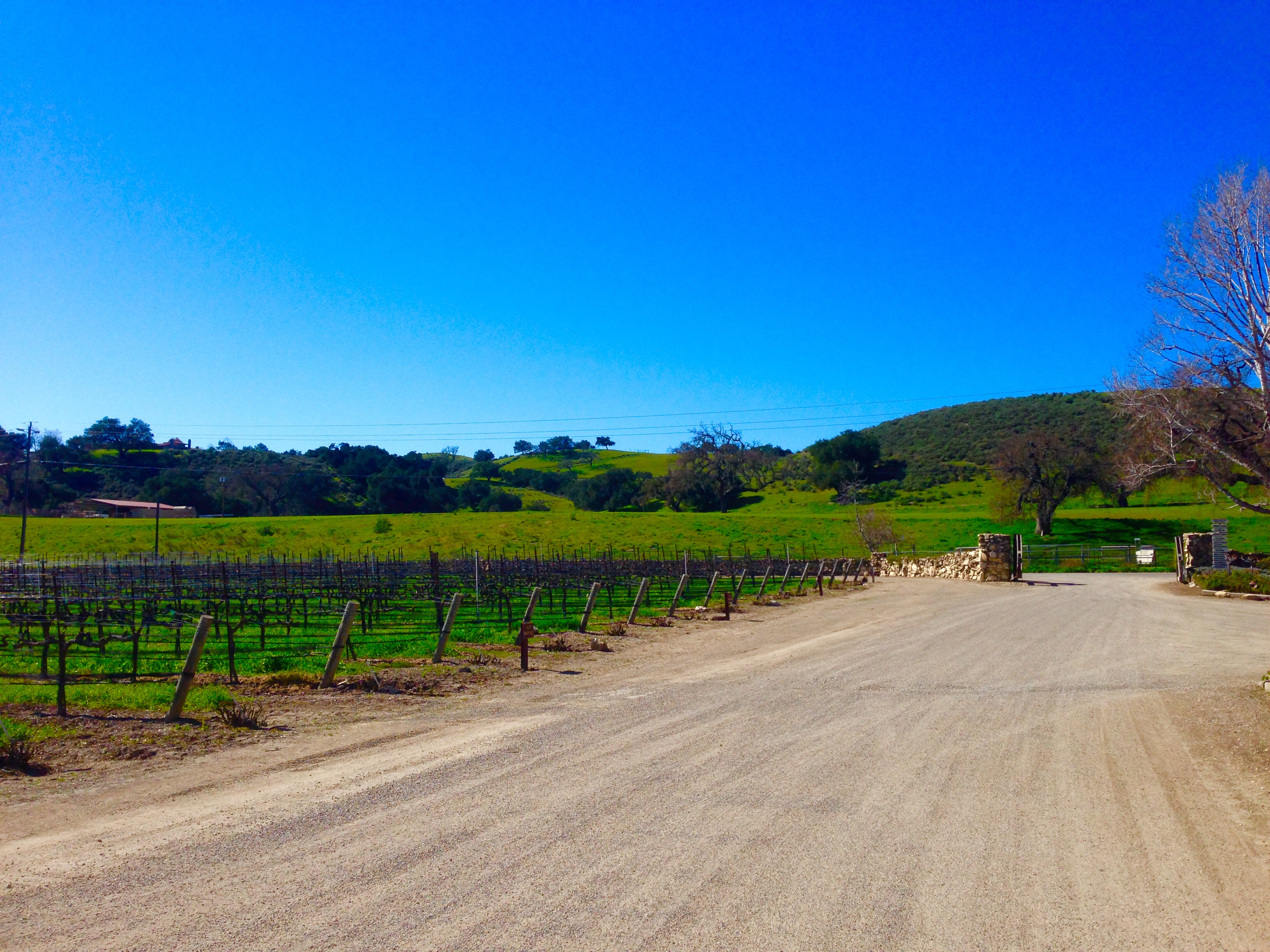
Sunstone Vineyards

=== Topography ===
Topography and geography distinguish the Santa Ynez Valley viticultural area from surrounding areas. The valley itself surrounds the Santa Ynez River and is defined by mountains to the north and south, by Lake Cachuma and the Los Padres National Forest to the east, and by a series of low hills to the west. To the north, the Purisima Hills rise from 1,200 to 1,700 feet (366–518 m) in elevation, and separate the Santa Ynez Valley from the Los Alamos-Valley. Similarly, the San Rafael Mountains separate the valley from the Santa Maria Valley, previously approved as an American viticultural area. These mountains generally range in elevation from 1,400 to 2,600 feet (427–792 m). The Santa Ynez Mountains on the south separate the Santa Ynez Valley from the Pacific Ocean; these mountains range in elevation from 800 to 2,500 feet (244–762 m). To the west, the Santa Ynez Valley narrows, and the Santa Rita Hills separate it from the Lompoc Valley. Within the Santa Ynez Valley, the Santa Ynez River flows west, descending in elevation from 750 feet (229 m) at Lake Cachuma to approximately 125 feet (38 m) at the extreme western end. Vineyards within the valley range in elevation from 200 to 400 feet (61–122 m) for those planted in proximity to the Santa Ynez River, to 1,300 to 1,500 feet (396–457 m) in elevation for vineyards' planted in the foothills of the San Rafael Mountains. Around Los Olivos, vineyards range between 650 and 900 feet (198 and 274 m) in elevation, those around Santa Ynez are between 500 and 600 feet (152 and 183 m) in elevation, while vineyards planted near Buellton range from 300 to 600 feet (91–183 m) in elevation.

=== Climate ===
The Santa Ynez Valley is a cool Region I on the scale developed by Winkler and Amerine of the University of California, Davis to measure degree days. Solving in the center of the valley registers an average of 2680 degree days. This contrasts with 1970 degree days (Region I) in nearby Lompoc, and with 2820 degree days for Santa Barbara, south of the Santa Ynez Mountains. Within the Santa Ynez Valley, summertime temperatures increase from west to east following the Santa Ynez River upstream. The Santa Rita Hills to the west block the colder ocean air, prevalent at Lompoc, from entering the Santa Ynez Valley and act to moderate the valley's climate. To the east, the boundary of the viticultural area is drawn along recognizable map features which approximately delineate the cooler temperatures of the Santa Ynez Valley from warmer temperatures further inland. Rainfall averages 16 inches within the Santa Ynez Valley although it is variable from year to year. Fog also plays an important factor in the climate of the viticultural area by keeping the valley cool and moist during the growing season. Fog is present to elevations of 1,000 to 1,200 feet (305–366 m) in the valley and nearly all vineyards are influenced by it.

=== Soils ===
Northern Santa Barbara County contains 14 major soil associations, but the Santa Ynez Valley contains only 7 major associations. Vineyard plantings are confined almost entirely to 3 of these soil associations. The Positas-Ballard-Santa Ynez association consists of well-drained fine sandy loams to clay loams. These soils occur on level to moderately steep slopes in the upper Santa Ynez Valley at elevations of 500 to 1,000 feet (152–305 m). Another association, the Chamise-Arnold-Crow Hill, consists of well-drained to excessively well-drained sand loams and clay loams. These soils are found on gentle to very steep slopes on high terraces and uplands. These soils occur on uplands from 200 to 3,000 feet (61–914 m) in elevation. The Shedd-Santa Lucia-Diablo association consists of steep, well-drained shaly clay loams and silty clay loams. A few vineyards are planted in the Sorrento-Mocho-Camarillo soil association and nearly level and consist of well-drained to somewhat poorly-drained sandy loams and silty clay loams. They are found on the flood plains and alluvial fans along the Santa Ynez River.

== See also ==
- Rhône Rangers
- Jalama Wines
