= Happy Canyon of Santa Barbara AVA =

American Viticultural Area in Santa Barbara County, California, United States

Coordinates: 34°37′24″N 119°59′10″W

Happy Canyon of Santa Barbara
- Wine region
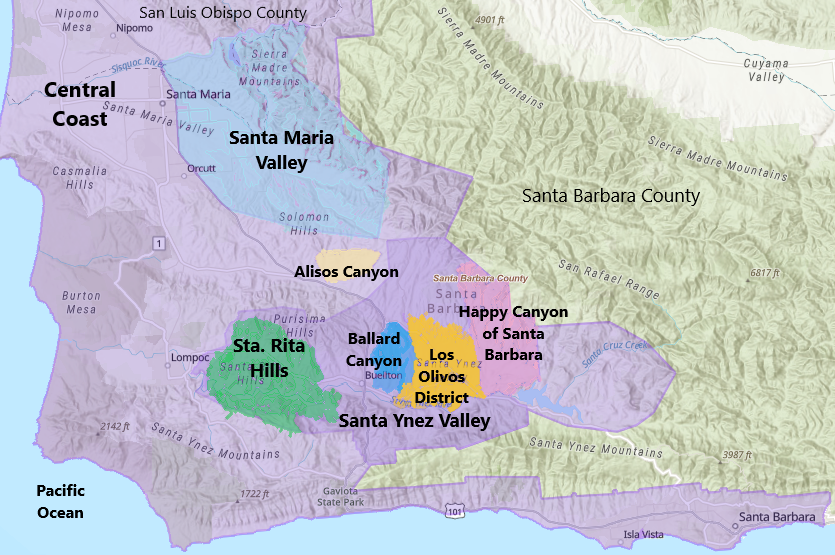
- Type: American Viticultural Area
- Year established: 2009
- Years of wine industry: 25
- Country: United States
- Part of: California, Central Coast AVA, Santa Barbara County, Santa Ynez Valley AVA
- Other regions in California, Central Coast AVA, Santa Barbara County, Santa Ynez Valley AVA: Ballard Canyon AVA, Los Olivos District AVA, Sta. Rita Hills AVA
- Growing season: 335 days
- Climate region: Region III
- Heat units: 3,340 GDD units
- Soil conditions: Shaly, silty and clay loams
- Total area: 23,941 acres (37 sq mi)
- Size of planted vineyards: 492 acres (199 ha)
- No. of vineyards: 6
- Grapes produced: Albarino, Cabernet Franc, Cabernet Sauvignon, Malbec, Merlot, Petit Verdot, Rosé, Sangiovese, Sauvignon blanc, Syrah, Viognier, Zinfandel
- No. of wineries: 2

Happy Canyon of Santa Barbara is an American Viticultural Area (AVA) located in Santa Barbara County, California within the Santa Ynez Valley landform. The wine appellation was established as the nation's 195th, the state's 118th and the county's fourth AVA on November 9, 2009 by the Alcohol and Tobacco Tax and Trade Bureau (TTB), Treasury after reviewing the petition submitted by Mr. Wesley D. Hagen, Vineyard Manager and Winemaker of Clos Pepe Vineyards in Lompoc, on behalf of Happy Canyon vintners and grape growers, proposing the viticultural area named "Happy Canyon of Santa Barbara.”

As Santa Barbara County's smallest appellation at 37 square miles (23,941 acres) it cultivated approximately 492 acres (199 ha) according to the petition. Happy Canyon comprises canyon terrain, hills, river and creek basins to the east and south of the San Rafael Mountains, northwest of Lake Cachuma and north of the Santa Ynez River. According to the petitioner and USGS maps, the "Happy Canyon" name applies to a specific canyon within the area. Elevations range from 500 feet (152 m) in the southwest corner to 3,430 feet (1,045 m) in the foothills of the San Rafael Range in the northeast corner. At the outset, it was home to six major vineyards and one active winery. The USDA plant hardiness zones range is 9a to 10a.

== History ==
Happy Canyon of Santa Barbara's history and tradition is similar to many California locales: an evolution from imperial/political (Land grant) to Mission/religious (establishment of College Ranch) and finally secular/agricultural (family ranches, farms, mining, homes and businesses). In the simplest terms, the area was created by a Spanish land grant, became a center of religious education, hosting what some histories call 'California's first college' and celebrated 19th Century vineyards, and was later sold in parcels by the Santa Ynez Land and Improvement Company, hoodwinking their buyers into the belief that the Pacific Coast Railway planned to lay a track through the Santa Ynez Valley. In the early 1840's, California's first Bishop, Garcia Diego, petitioned Governor Micheltorena for a land grant. On March 16, 1844 the Governor granted Bishop Joseph Sadoc Alemany the "rancho known as Canada de los Pinos in the valley of the Santa Ynez River", inclusive of the area that is currently known as Happy Canyon of Santa Barbara. The rancho soon had a more common name, "College Ranch", as a result of the dedication, in May, 1844, of the College of Our Lady of Refugio, the first College in California. College Ranch proper was located a few miles west of the western boundary of the Happy Canyon of Santa Barbara American Viticultural Area "The Rancho Canada de los Pinos long since had become universally known as the College Ranch. In 1882 when the college closed, Archbishop Alemany obtained permission from Congress to sell the land, and it was divided between the Archdiocese of San Francisco, which received 20,000 acres (8,094 ha), and the Diocese of Monterey, which retained about 16,000 acres (6,475 ha)."

In 1887, the Santa Ynez Land and Improvement Company sold College Ranch's 6,000 acres (2,428 ha) in various sized parcels. Many of the buyers were led to believe that the Pacific Coast railroad would be built with a track skirting Santa Ynez, which never occurred. Santa Ynez was established as a town to serve the trade needs of the inhabitants of the College Ranch and the resulting smaller ranches formed by the sale detailed above.

Sometime between the end of the 19th and beginning of the 20th Century, grapevines were planted in the College Ranch area of Santa Barbara County making it one of the first locales in the greater Santa Ynez Valley hosting vineyards. Historian Jesse D. Mason passes along a late 19th century promotional review of sorts for early College Ranch Vineyards: "Experts in wine-making rank the Jonata and College Ranchos as first[rate] vine land. The soil and climate seem well adapted to grapes."

== Terroir ==
=== Topography ===
The topography of the Happy Canyon of Santa Barbara viticultural area includes varying elevations, rolling foothills, and a distinctive southwest drainage. According to the USGS maps, the viticultural area lies on the east side and in the higher elevations of the Santa Ynez Valley region. Elevations within the boundary line range from 500 feet (152 m) in the southwest corner to 3,430 feet (1,045 m) in the northeast corner, in the foothills of the San Rafael Range. The petition explains that between the Pacific Ocean and the Santa Ynez Valley, hills and mountains trend west-to-east. As the elevation of the Santa Ynez Valley rises from west to east, the hills and mountains turn from a west-east direction to a generally north-south direction. The viticultural area, located inland, lies along mountains and hills with a north-south orientation. The southwest drainage pattern of the viticultural area is comparatively unique. To the west of the boundary line, between Santa Agueda Creek and Figueroa Mountain Road, the drainage pattern trends south-southeast.

=== Climate ===
Of all the grape-growing areas in the Santa Ynez Valley, Happy Canyon is the furthest inland and has the warmest climate. It is located in the easternmost part of the Santa Ynez Valley, and the daytime highs and nighttime lows in that part of the county vary more in a 24-hour period than those in other parts of the valley. At about 12 miles (19 km) west of the viticultural area, the inland mountain ranges change direction from west-east to north-south. The north-south mountain ridge blocks the Pacific coastal breezes, preventing them from cooling the canyon. As a result, the ridge traps in heat in Happy Canyon during the warmer growing months. The petition for the Happy Canyon of Santa Barbara viticultural area includes climatic data for the period 2004–6 provided by Kerry Martin of Coastal Vineyard Care Associates. Some of the data for the Happy Canyon area and the areas to the west and north of Happy Canyon were obtained from data stations located in vineyards and maintained by Coastal Vineyard Care Associates. The data for the areas to the east and south of Happy Canyon were retrieved from the Western Regional Climate Center and the California Irrigation Management Information System (CIMIS), respectively. The petitioner used those data in creating the petition table, which compares growing degree days, based on the Winkler climate classification system, for Happy Canyon and the surrounding areas. In the Winkler system, as a measurement of heat accumulation during the growing season, 1 degree day accumulates for each degree Fahrenheit that a day's mean temperature is above 50 degrees, which is the minimum temperature required for grapevine growth. The data, in degree days, show that, compared to the Happy Canyon area, areas to the north, south, and west of Happy Canyon average between 5 and 20 percent cooler and the area to the east averages 15 percent warmer.

=== Soils and Geology ===
The two major soil types in the Happy Canyon of Santa Barbara viticultural area are related to topography. Alluvial soils are at lower elevations and on bottoms of canyons; upland soils are at higher elevations of canyons and on surrounding peaks and hilltops. The current soil survey shows that the soil characteristics of the Happy Canyon of Santa Barbara viticultural area include green serpentine (magnesium silicate hydroxide) parent material, elevated levels of exchangeable magnesium, lower levels of exchangeable sodium, and a high cation-exchange capacity (CEC). High CEC levels, because of the amount of positively charged ions in the soils, increase the uptake of nutrients by plant roots. The viticultural area comprises the Shedd-Santa Lucia-Diablo and Toomes-Climara associations on uplands. The Shedd-Santa Lucia-Diablo association consists of strongly sloping to very steep, well drained shaly clay loams and silty clays. The Toomes-Climara association consists of moderately steep to very steep, somewhat excessively drained and well drained clay loams and clays. The Chamise-Arnold-Crow Hills association is of greater extent in the western portion of the Santa Ynez Valley viticultural area, west of the Happy Canyon of Santa Barbara viticultural area. This association consists of gently sloping to very steep, well drained and somewhat excessively drained sands to clay loams on high terraces and uplands. The petitioner explains that the soils in the western portion of the Santa Ynez Valley viticultural area, compared to the soils in the Happy Canyon of Santa Barbara viticultural area, have less magnesium, a significantly lower CEC level, and higher amounts of exchangeable sodium. Although drainage patterns change along the western boundary line, the soils on both sides of the boundary line are similar. The Positas-Ballard-Santa Ynez soil association is scattered throughout much of the southern part of the Happy Canyon of Santa Barbara viticultural area. Sedimentary rock, unfavorable for viticulture, is predominant along the south side of the Santa Ynez River, outside the boundary line. The petitioner provides the results of two soil studies conducted in connection with the Happy Canyon of Santa Barbara viticultural area. The first study details the differences in CEC among soils tested at sites in the viticultural area and in areas immediately southwest and further west of the boundary line, in the western end of the Santa Ynez Valley. The study shows that the soils in the viticultural area have significantly more magnesium and an elevated CEC level as compared to the soils in areas beyond the boundary line to the southwest and west. The petitioner also notes that the levels of calcium and sodium in the soils in the Happy Canyon are less than half those in the soils to the southwest and west. The second study that the petitioner provided examines the differences in soils in the Happy Canyon of Santa Barbara viticultural area and in canyons outside the boundary line, as far west as Figueroa Mountain Road, which is located approximately four miles (6 km) away. The study is based on an acreage on approximately 35,000 acres (14,164 ha) within the viticultural area and on an equal number of acres to the west. The results of that study confirm the differences in total acreage and slope of soils in areas on either side of the western boundary line of the Happy Canyon of Santa Barbara viticultural area.
