= Sta. Rita Hills AVA =

American Viticultural Area in Santa Barbara County, California, United States

Coordinates: 34°38′03″N 120°17′17″W

Sta. Rita Hills
- Wine region
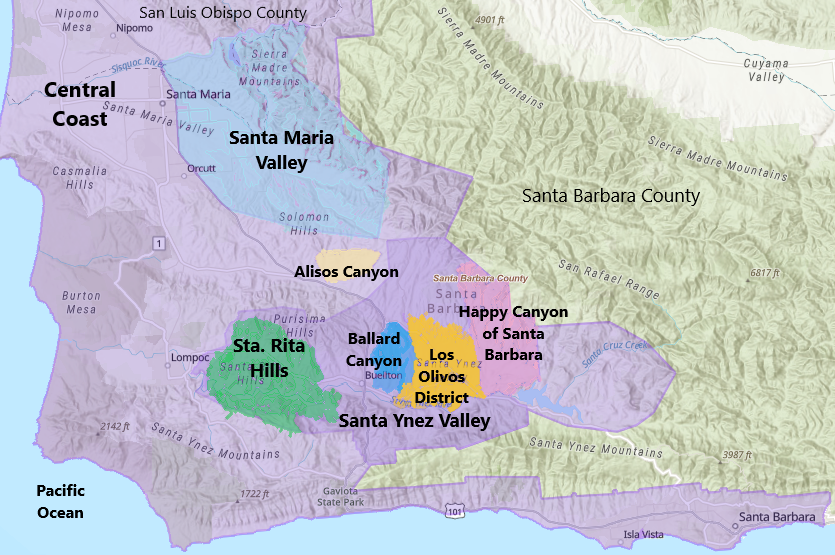
- Type: American Viticultural Area
- Year established: 2001; 2006 Abbrev; 2016 Expansion:
- Years of wine industry: 55
- Country: United States
- Part of: California, Central Coast AVA, Santa Barbara County, Santa Ynez Valley AVA
- Other regions in California, Central Coast AVA, Santa Barbara County, Santa Ynez Valley AVA: Ballard Canyon AVA, Happy Canyon of Santa Barbara AVA, Los Olivos District AVA
- Growing season: 309 days
- Climate region: Region I
- Soil conditions: Loams, sandy loams, silt loams, and clay loams based on large percentages of dune sand, marine deposits, recent alluvium, river wash, and terrace deposits
- Total area: 35,520 acres (56 sq mi)
- Size of planted vineyards: 2,700 acres (1,093 ha)
- No. of vineyards: 60
- Grapes produced: Barbera, Chardonnay, Dolcetto, Dornfelder, Grenache, Mission, Pinot Blanc, Pinot Gris, Pinot Noir, Riesling, Sauvignon Blanc, Syrah, Viognier, Zinfandel
- No. of wineries: 12
- Comments: As of 2025

Sta. Rita Hills is an American Viticultural Area (AVA) located in Santa Barbara County, California within the vast Santa Ynez Valley landform. The area was established as the nation's 144th, the state's 86th and the county's third appellation on May 31, 2001, by the Bureau of Alcohol, Tobacco and Firearms (ATF), Treasury after reviewing the petition submitted by J. Richard Sanford (Sanford Winery) and drafted by Wesley D. Hagen (Vineyard Manager of Clos Pepe Vineyards), signed by 22 people, 14 of whom are local wine grape growers, proposing a viticultural area encompassed by, but separate from, the Santa Ynez Valley appellation to be named "Santa Rita Hills."

According to the petition, there was currently two wineries and seventeen vineyards cultivating 500 acres (202 ha) within Santa Rita Hills with two additional vineyards being developed. From its designation in 2001 through 2005, the approximately 30,720 acres (48 sq mi) was officially named Santa Rita Hills. The 2006 formal name abbreviation was the result of a protest by and subsequent negotiations with Vina Santa Rita, a very large Chilean wine producer that was concerned about the AVA name diluting its international brand value. The name change took effect on January 5, 2006, with a yearlong period for producers in the AVA to change their wine labels.
In 2016, the Alcohol and Tobacco Tax and Trade Bureau (TTB) expanded the then 33,380 acres (52 sq mi) Sta. Rita Hills viticultural area by approximately 2,296 acres (4 sq mi). The USDA plant hardiness zone range is 9b to 10b.

== History ==
Santa Rita was distinguished as a recognized political and geographical region on April 12, 1845, as land granted to José Ramón Malo from Spanish Governor Pio Pico. The title was confirmed to Ramón Malo on June 25, 1875, by President Ulysses S. Grant as confirmed in U.S. Patent Book 'A', page 277 (see Exhibit One, pages 1–4). The patent issued included 13,316 acres (21 sq mi) within the boundary of the Santa Rita Land Grant. The text to follow comes from Owen O'Neill's History of Santa Barbara County, printed in 1939: "Following the secularization of the Mission La Purisima, the rest of the valley was broken up into seven great ranchos granted to private owners. They were the Santa Rosa, Santa Rita, Salsipuedes, La Purisima, Mission Vieja, Lompoc and a portion of the Jesús Maria." Winegrapes have been grown in the Santa Rita area of Santa Barbara County since the nineteenth century. Early growers and priestly vintners used the Mission grape to vinify sacramental wines at Mission La Purisima near Lompoc. Even then, the priests noticed that the Santa Rita Hills climate was too cool for the Mission grape, and they found it was not ripening as well as some of the plantings further inland. The maritime climate and sandy/alluvial soils have provided Santa Rita farmers with excellent cultivation conditions for U.C. Davis Region One crops for over a hundred years: flowers, peppers, beans, broccoli, lettuce, and other cool-weather vegetables.
The first vineyard in the region, Sanford & Benedict, was planted in 1971. However, it was not until 1997 that Wes Hagen and local viticulturists intently explored the terrain's valleys and hills taking soil samples, surveying elevation levels, and compiling degree-days data. The Saint Rita Hills Winegrowers Alliance, spearheaded by Richard Sanford, Bryan Babcock, Rick Longoria and local vintners to unify the region's winegrowers, extensively surveyed maps, discussed boundaries and compiled data to compose the AVA petition for submittal to the ATF.

== Terroir ==
=== Topography ===
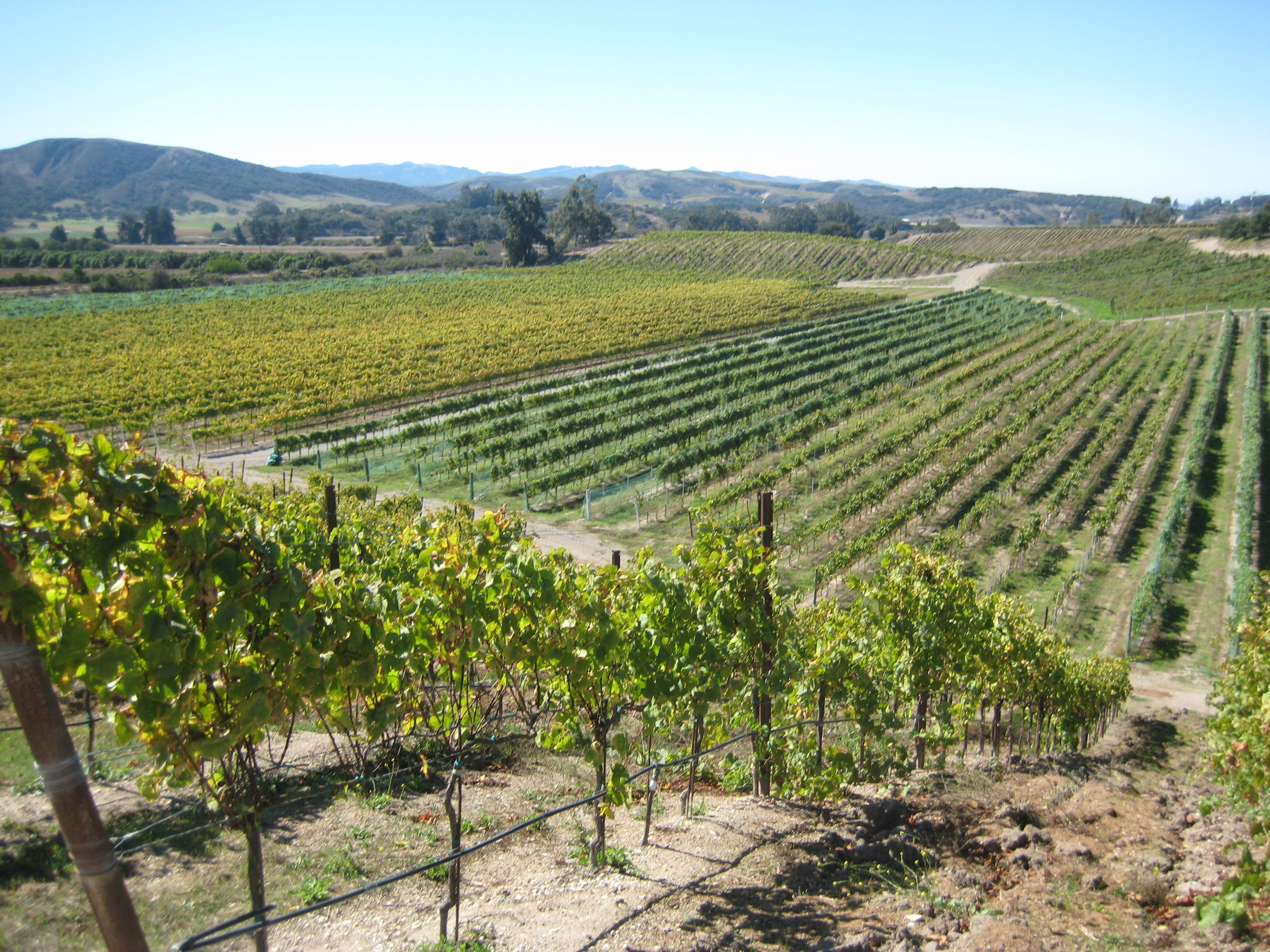
Sta. Rita Hills vineyard

The topography of the Sta. Rita Hills AVA is distinct and isolated from the rest of the Pacific Coast, the Central Coast, and the Santa Ynez Valley east of U.S. Highway 101 and the Buellton Flats. The appellation is demarcated by the east–west ranges of the Purisima Hills on the north and the Santa Rosa Hills on the south, framing Sta. Rita Hills. When surveying the land within Sta. Rita Hills to determine what locales would be the outer "edges," the petitioner states the following was taken into account: viticultural viability, primarily hillside and alluvial basin plantings, and the coastal influence suitable for cool-climate still winegrape production. The actual topography of the Sta. Rita Hills AVA is an oak-studded, hill-laden maritime throat that runs east to west, a few miles east of Lompoc to a few miles west of Buellton Flats. The coastal influence enters from the west, through Lompoc, and abruptly loses its influence at the eastern boundary, as demarcated on the enclosed U.S.G.S. maps. Elevations within the boundary range from near sea-level to the 1,800-foot (549 m) ridge-line.

=== Climate ===
The climatic features of the viticultural area and thus the varietals grown therein, set it apart from the Santa Ynez Valley AVA, which borders the viticultural area. The Santa Ynez Valley area east of U.S. Highway 101 is characterized by higher temperatures than the Sta. Rita Hills AVA to the west, which has a cool climate and is thus more conducive to growing "Region One" cool-climate winegrape varietals. By contrast, the eastern area of the Santa Ynez Valley, a "Region Two" growing area, provides a warmer climate and is well known for the production of varietal winegrapes such as Cabernet Sauvignon, Cabernet Franc, Merlot, Sauvignon Blanc, Mourvedre, and other varietals that require a significantly higher temperature (degree days) for adequate ripening. The Sta. Rita Hills AVA, to the west of U.S. Highway 101, is better known for varietals such as Chardonnay and Pinot Noir, which are the predominant winegrapes there. In addition, ambient temperature and evapotranspiration rates during veraison and ripening are disparate for the two adjacent viticultural locales. The average post-veraison ripening temperature is 14.7 °F (−10 °C) hotter within the Santa Ynez Valley AVA than in the Sta. Rita Hills AVA to the west. Similarly, the heating degree day differential (with the base of 50 °F (10 °C)) between the two areas is 61 heating degree days, indicating an annual 92 heating degree days in the western Lompoc boundary and an annual 153 heating degree days in the eastern Cachuma Lake boundary. These temperature differences are the result of a unique set of topographical, geological and climatic influences, particularly coastal in origin. The Sta. Rita Hills AVA is situated within the clearly defined east/west transverse maritime throat, and thus is susceptible to the ocean's cooling influence. This enables diurnal ocean breezes direct access to the coastal valleys between the Purisima Hills and the Santa Rosa Hills, which house the AVA. The coastal influence is not nearly as pronounced in the Santa Ynez Valley east of U.S. Highway 101 and the Buellton Flats. In addition, the proximity of the AVA to the Pacific Ocean fills the hills and valleys of the Sta. Rita Hills AVA in the late night and early morning hours with coastal fog. This intensifies the cool-climate influence on varietal winegrape production between the geological boundaries of the Purisima Hills and the Santa Rosa Hills.

=== Soils ===
The soils of the Sta. Rita Hills are broken down from an array of geological parent material, with the most common types being loams, sandy loams, silt loams, and clay loams. These soils are based on large percentages of dune sand, marine deposits, recent alluvium, river wash, and terrace deposits, which are shown on maps provided in the exhibits of the petition. Soil samples collected from selected sites within the "Sta. Rita Hills" AVA and the adjacent Santa Ynez Valley AVA show a distinct difference resulting from a high percentage of alluvial and marine sand within the Sta. Rita Hills area. While the soil samples from the "Sta. Rita Hills" AVA show higher percentages of sand, silt and sandy loams, the soil samples from the eastern Santa Ynez Valley show a higher percentage of gravelly and clay loams. Also, soil analysis test results from several vineyards in the "Sta. Rita Hills" AVA conducted by various labs in the area support the distinct soil data claims.

== Viticulture ==
The AVA petition was submitted by viticulturists and vintners in the area under the direction of J. Richard Sanford of Sanford & Benedict Vineyard, Bryan Babcock of Babcock Vineyards and Winery, and Wesley D. Hagen, Vineyard Manager of Clos Pepe Vineyards. In 2004, the U.S. film Sideways prominently featured Sta. Rita Hills' red wine varietal Pinot noir, its wineries and locations. "Sideways Fest" is an annual three-day event hosted by the Sta. Rita Hills Wine Alliance celebrating the anniversary of the movie's filming in the Santa Ynez Valley.

== See also ==
- Fiddlehead Cellars
- Pali Wine Co.
