= Purisima Hills =

Mountain range in Southern California, United States

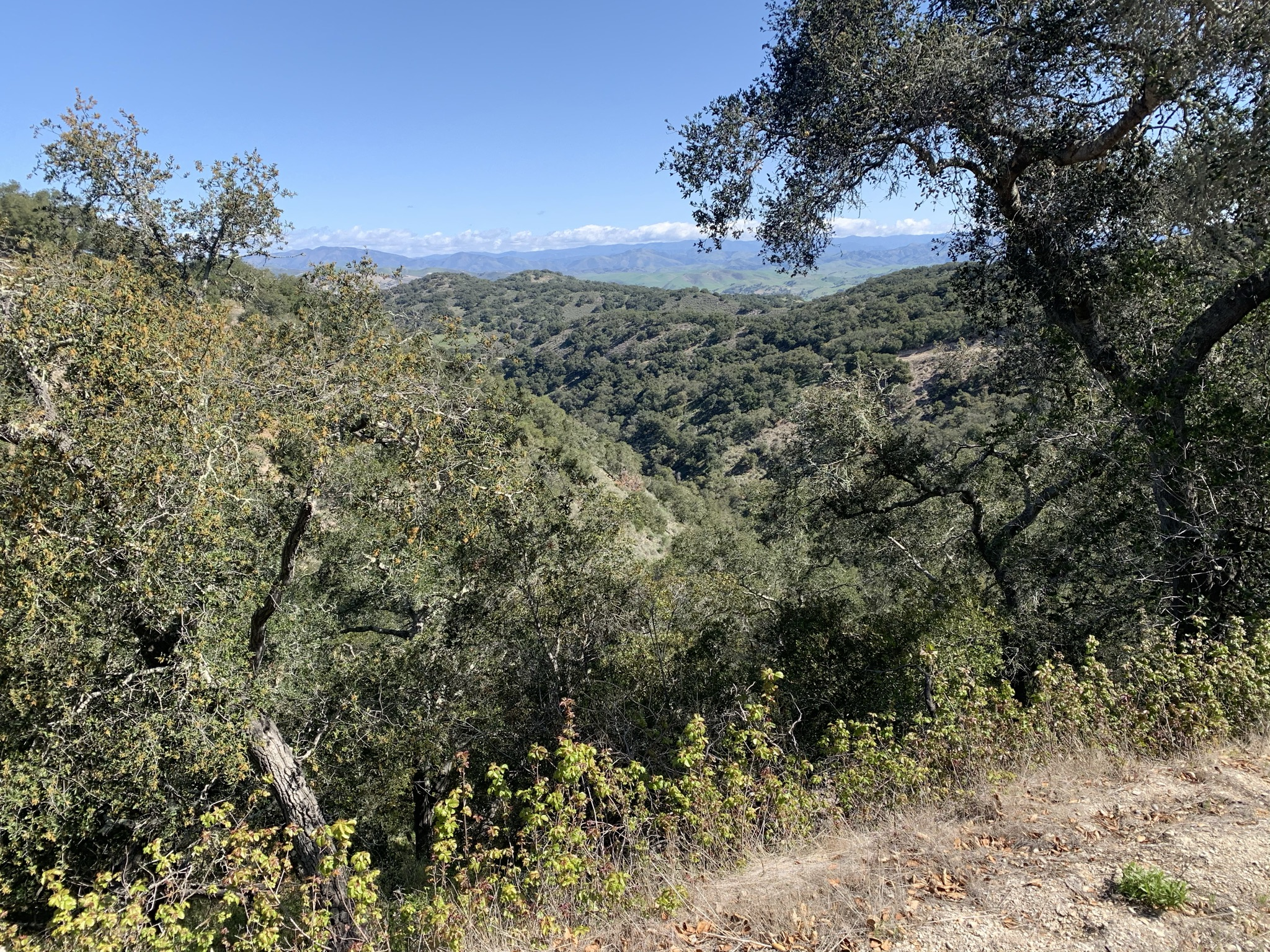
- Looking North towards Los Alamos from Drum Canyon Road.

Geography
- Location within California
- Country: United States
- State: California
- County: Santa Barbara
- Range coordinates: 34°41′05″N 120°16′18″W
- Parent range: California Coast Ranges

The Purisima Hills are a northwest-to-southeast trending low mountain range of the Outer Southern California Coast Ranges, located in Santa Barbara County, California. They divide the Santa Ynez Valley on the south from the Los Alamos Valley on the north.

They are the location of the economically important Lompoc Oil Field.

The Purisima Hills are the southernmost location in the current natural range of the coast Douglas-Fir (Pseudotsuga menziesii var. menziesii).
