= Blanchett =

Blanchett or Blanchette is a given name or surname of French origin.

People with this surname include:

- Andrulla Blanchette (born 1966), a female bodybuilder
- Cate Blanchett (born 1969), Australian actor
- Christopher Blanchett (born 1982), English broadcast journalist
- Danny Blanchett (born 1987), footballer
- Ian Neale Blanchett (born 1975), Australian born English cricketer
- Jude Blanchette, American foreign policy analyst and China specialist
- Louis Blanchette (1739–93), explorer and founder of Saint Charles, Missouri
- Oliva Blanchette (1929–2021), American philosopher
- Patricia Blanchette, American philosopher

People with this given name include:

- Blanchette Brunoy (1915–2005), actress
- Blanchette Hooker Rockefeller (1909–92), wife of John D. Rockefeller III
- The heroine of Eugène Brieux's 1892 play Blanchette.

== Wine grapes ==
Several French wine grapes have Blanchette as a synonym. These include:

- Chasselas, another name for the wine grape Blanchette
- Canari noir, another name for the wine grape Blanchette rouge
- Mondeuse blanche, a wine grape which is also known as Blanchette
- Verdesse, another wine grape which is also known as Blanchette

== Other uses ==
- Blanchette Cemetery, Beaumont, Texas is the resting-place of Blind Willie Johnson (1897–1945), Baptist minister and bluesman
