= Servanin =

Variety of grape

- Grape (Vitis)
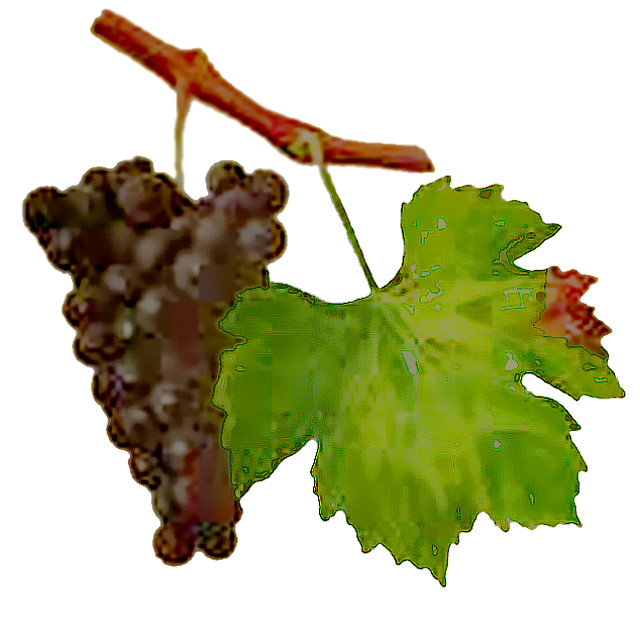
- Servanin
- Color of berry skin: Noir
- Species: Vitis vinifera
- Also called: See list of synonyms
- Origin: France
- VIVC number: 11526

Servanin is a red French wine grape variety grown predominantly in the Isère department in eastern France. While the variety has a long history in the region, plantings have been steadily declining since the early 20th century with the vine now close to extinction.

In the 20th century, ampelographers Louis Levadoux and (decades later) Linda Bisson categorized Servanin as a member of the Pelorsien eco-geogroup along with Bia blanc, Béclan, Dureza, Exbrayat, Durif, Jacquère, Mondeuse blanche, Peloursin, Joubertin and Verdesse.

== Synonyms ==
Over the years Servanin has been known under a variety of synonyms including: Martelet, Persagne Douce, Petite Mondeuse, Salagnin, Sérène, Servagin, Servagneien, Servagnie, Servagnien, Servagnien des Avenières, Servagnin, Servanien and Servani.
