= Bia blanc =

Variety of grape

Bia blanc (French pronunciation: [bja blɑ̃]) is a white French wine grape variety that is no longer commercially cultivated for wine production with only a few plantings existing worldwide in viticultural archives and experimental vineyards. The exact origins of Bia blanc are not yet known though ampelographers have noted that the grapevine shares some morphological similarities to the red Isère grape Peloursin, one of the parent varieties to Petite Sirah (Durif).

== Eco-geogroup ==
In the 20th century, ampelographers Louis Levadoux and (decades later) Linda Bisson categorized Bia blanc as a member of the Pelorsien eco-geogroup along with Durif, Béclan, Dureza, Exbrayat, Jacquère, Joubertin, Mondeuse blanche, Peloursin, Servanin and Verdesse.

== Synonyms ==
Over the years, Bia blanc has been known under a variety of synonyms including: Bear, Beard and Biard.
