= Propagation of grapevines =

Part of commercial winemaking and viticulture

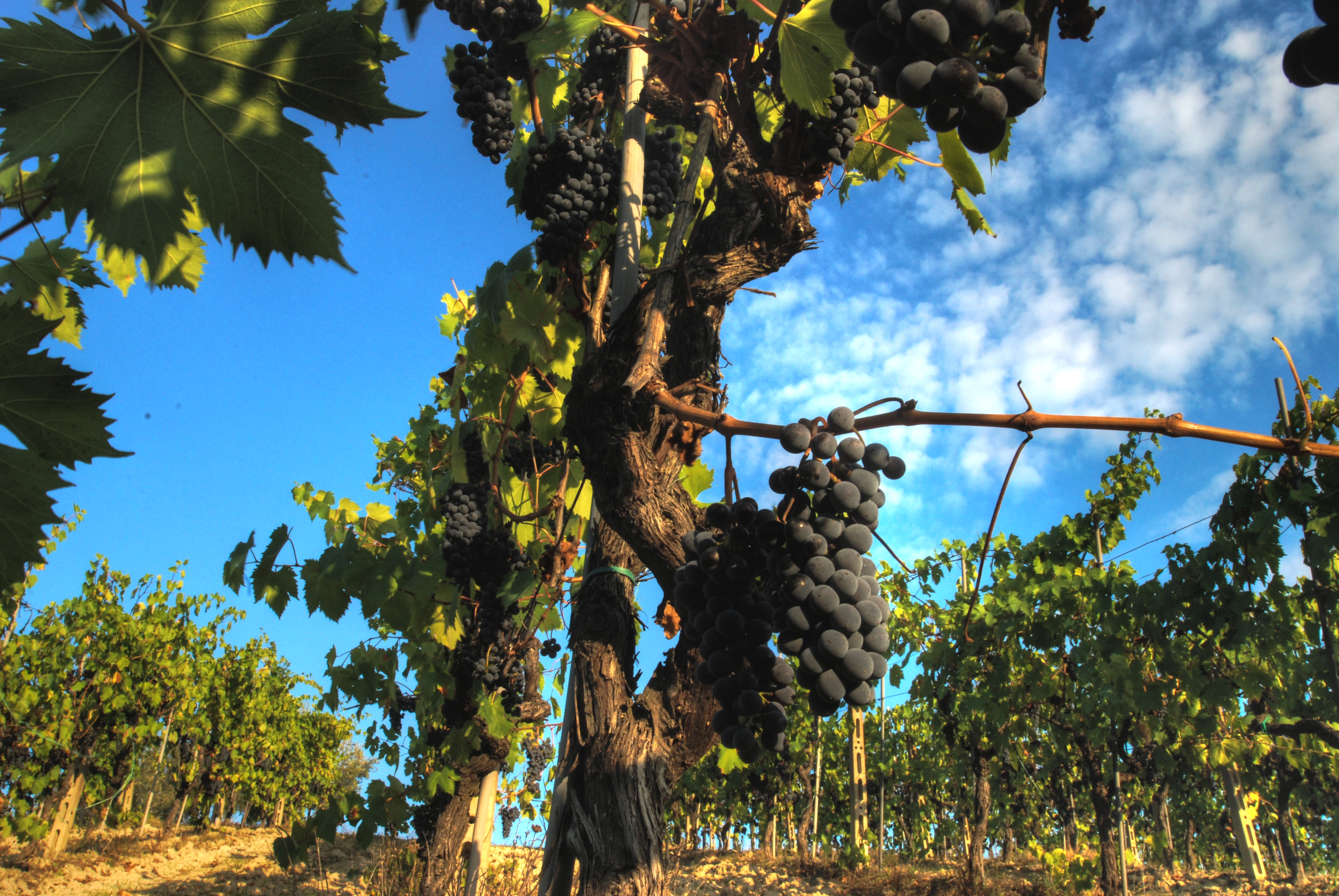
A Sangiovese grapevine in a vineyard with a cane extended. Prior to this cane developing grape clusters it could have been planted in the ground to propagate by layering.

The propagation of grapevines is an important consideration in commercial viticulture and winemaking. Grapevines, most of which belong to the Vitis vinifera family, produce one crop of fruit each growing season with a limited life span for individual vines. While some centenarian old vine examples of grape varieties exist, most grapevines are between the ages of 10 and 30 years. As vineyard owners seek to replant their vines, a number of techniques are available which may include planting a new cutting that has been selected by either clonal or mass (massal) selection. Vines can also be propagated by grafting a new plant vine upon existing rootstock or by layering one of the canes of an existing vine into the ground next to the vine and severing the connection when the new vine develops its own root system.

In commercial viticulture, grapevines are rarely propagated from seedlings as each seed contains unique genetic information from its two parent varieties (the flowering parent and the parent that provided the pollen that fertilized the flower) and would, theoretically, be a different variety than either parent. This would be true even if two hermaphroditic vine varieties, such as Chardonnay, cross pollinated each other. While the grape clusters that would arise from the pollination would be considered Chardonnay, any vines that sprang from one of the seeds of the grape berries would be considered a distinct variety other than Chardonnay. It is for this reason that grapevines are usually propagated from cuttings while grape breeders will utilize seedlings to come up with new grape varieties including crossings that include parents of two varieties within the same species (such as Cabernet Sauvignon which is a crossing of the Vitis vinifera varieties Cabernet Franc and Sauvignon blanc) or hybrid grape varieties which include parents from two different Vitis species such as the Armagnac grape Baco blanc, which was propagated from the vinifera grape Folle blanche and the Vitis labrusca variety Noah.

== Terminology ==
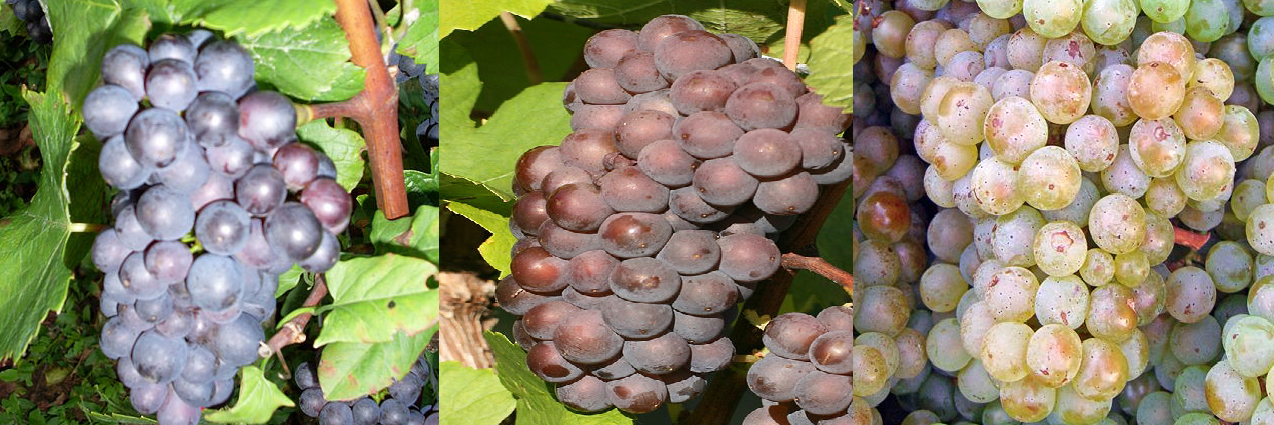
Pinot gris (center) and Pinot blanc (right) are color mutations of Pinot noir (left).

A color mutation is a grape variety that while genetically similar to the original variety is considered unique enough to merit being considered its own variety. Both Pinot gris and Pinot blanc are color mutations of Pinot noir.

In viticulture, a clone is a single vine that has been selected from a "mother vine" to which it is identical. This clone may have been selected deliberately from a grapevine that has demonstrated desirable traits (good yields, grape disease resistance, small berry size, etc.) and propagated as cuttings from that mother vine. Varieties such as Sangiovese and Pinot noir are well known to have a variety of clones. While there may be slight mutations to differentiate the various clones, all clones are considered genetically part of the same variety (i.e. Sangiovese or Pinot noir).

A selection massale is the opposite of cloning, where growers select cuttings from the mass of the vineyard, or a field blend.

A crossing is a new grape variety that was created by the cross pollination of two different varieties of the same species. Syrah is a crossing of two French Vitis vinifera species, Dureza from the Ardèche and Mondeuse blanche from Savoie. Theoretically, every seedling (also known as a selfling), even if its pollinated by a member of the same grape variety (i.e. such as two Merlot vines), is a crossing as any vine that results from the seed being planted will be a different grape variety distinct from either parent.

A hybrid is a new grape variety that was produced from a cross pollination of two different grape species. In the early history of American winemaking, grape growers would cross the European Vitis vinifera vines with American vine varieties such as Vitis labrusca to create French-American hybrids that were more resistant to American grape diseases such as downy and powdery mildew as well as phylloxera. When the phylloxera epidemic of the mid to late 19th century hit Europe, some growers in European wine regions experimented with using hybrids until a solution involving grafting American rootstocks to vinifera varieties was found. Eventually, the use of hybrids in wine production declined with their use formally outlawed by European wine laws in the 1950s.

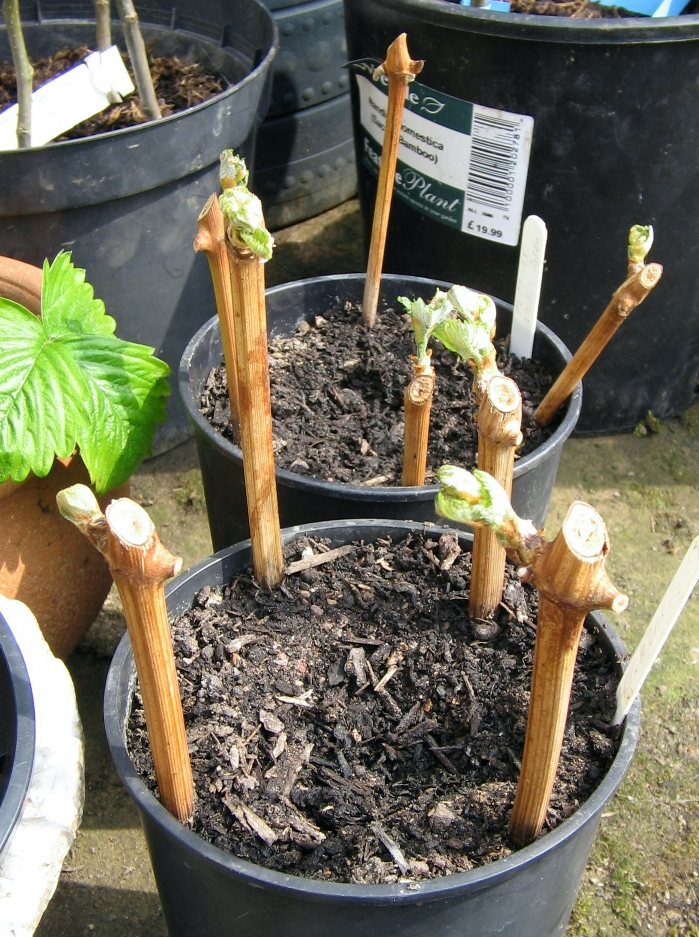
Young vine cuttings in a nursery

== Propagation methods ==
As commercial winemakers usually want to work with a desired grape variety that dependably produces a particular crop, most grapevines are propagated by clonal or massal selection of plant material. This can be accomplished in one of three ways.

=== Cuttings ===
This involves a shoot taken from a mother vine and then planted where the shoot will eventually sprout a root system and regenerate itself into a full-fledged vine with trunk and canopy. Often new cuttings will be first planted in a nursery where it is allowed to develop for a couple of years before being planted in the vineyard.

=== Grafting ===
Grafting is a process in which a new grape vine is produced by making a cut in the rootstock and then adding scionwood that is cut to fit inside the incision made in the rootstock. This involves removing the canopy and most of the trunk of an existing vine and replacing it with a cutting of a new vine that is sealed by a graft union.

There are two main types of grafting in the relation to the propagation of a grapevine.

==== Bench Grafting ====
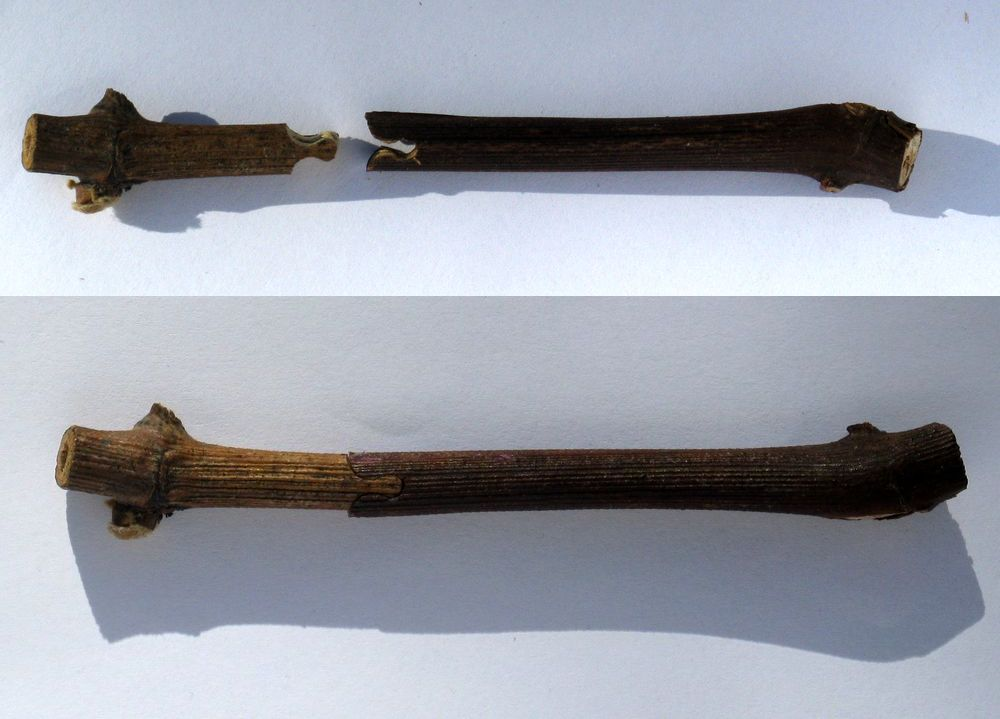
Omega Graft

This process is typically performed in the beginning of a new year in a greenhouse, taking place during the late winter months, to the early spring months. This process is used on younger and smaller vines before the vines are planted in a vineyard. However, the type of cut made on the grape vine determines the classification of the Bench graft. The two techniques to perform a Bench Graft includes the Omega Graft and the Whip Graft.

The Omega Graft is performed by the rootstock and scion being grafted together by the two pieces being cut into shapes that align together.

The Whip Graft is performed by making an identical small dip at angle into the rootstock and the scion, so they can be adjoined.

==== Field Grafting ====
Field grafting is performed after the vine has been planted in a vineyard and has aged a few years. The objective of using this method is to avoid replanting and a final product of a grapevine with two diversifications. The procedure of field grafting is performed with the vines still planted, by making two inversions in the rootstock of a certain type of grapevines and placing two of the same type of scions that differ from the rootstock into the rootstock. The most common ways to perform field grafting are the Chip Bud method, the T Bud method, the Cleft Graft and the Bark Graft.

The Chip Bud Method is performed shortly after the grape vine is planted, giving the rootstock enough time to become active but the bud of the grape vine is still inactive. It is performed by cutting two small slopes in both sides of the rootstock and cutting a small scion into a small bud and placing the scion bud into the cuts made on the rootstock.

The T Bud Method is performed by making a cutting a T at the bottom of the grapevine that is above the soil. Once the T is cut, the bark surrounding the cut is pulled back and the scion is placed between the two sides that were pulled back.

The Chip Graft is performed on the branches of a grape vine, when the rootstock is dormant. The method is performed by making a wedge in the rootstock and placing two scions into the wedge. After the Graft starts growing one of the scions is removed, leaving only one to grow.

The Bark Graft is performed by making three incisions on the edge of the grape vine's rootstock, and removing majority of the bark around each of the cuttings, leaving a small amount of bark at the end of the cut and inserting three of the same scions into the incisions, using the remaining piece of the cut bark to cover the end of the scions.

=== Layering ===
In established vineyards where only a few vines need to be replaced within a row (such as vine lost to machine damage or disease), a new vine can be propagated by bending a cane from a neighboring vine into the ground and covering it with dirt. This segment of vine will soon begin sprouting its own independent root system while still being nourished by the connecting vine. Eventually, the connection between the two vines is severed, allowing each vine to grow independently.

== Clonal versus massal selection ==
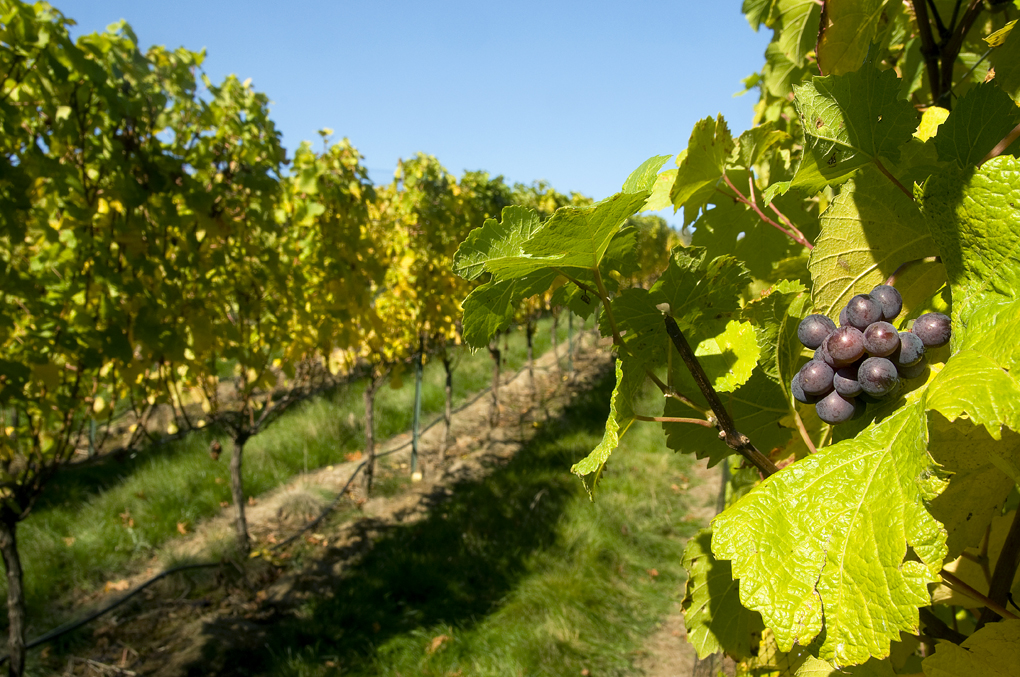
One criticism of clonal selection is that the use of only one or two clones greatly diminishes the genetic diversity of a vineyard.

Each cutting, taken from a mother vine, is a clone of that vine. The way that a vine grower selects these cuttings can be described as either clonal or massal selection. In clonal selection, an ideal plant within a vineyard or nursery that has exhibited the most desirable traits is selected with all cuttings taken from that single plant. In massal (or "mass") selection, cuttings are taken from several vines of the same variety that have collectively demonstrated desirable traits.

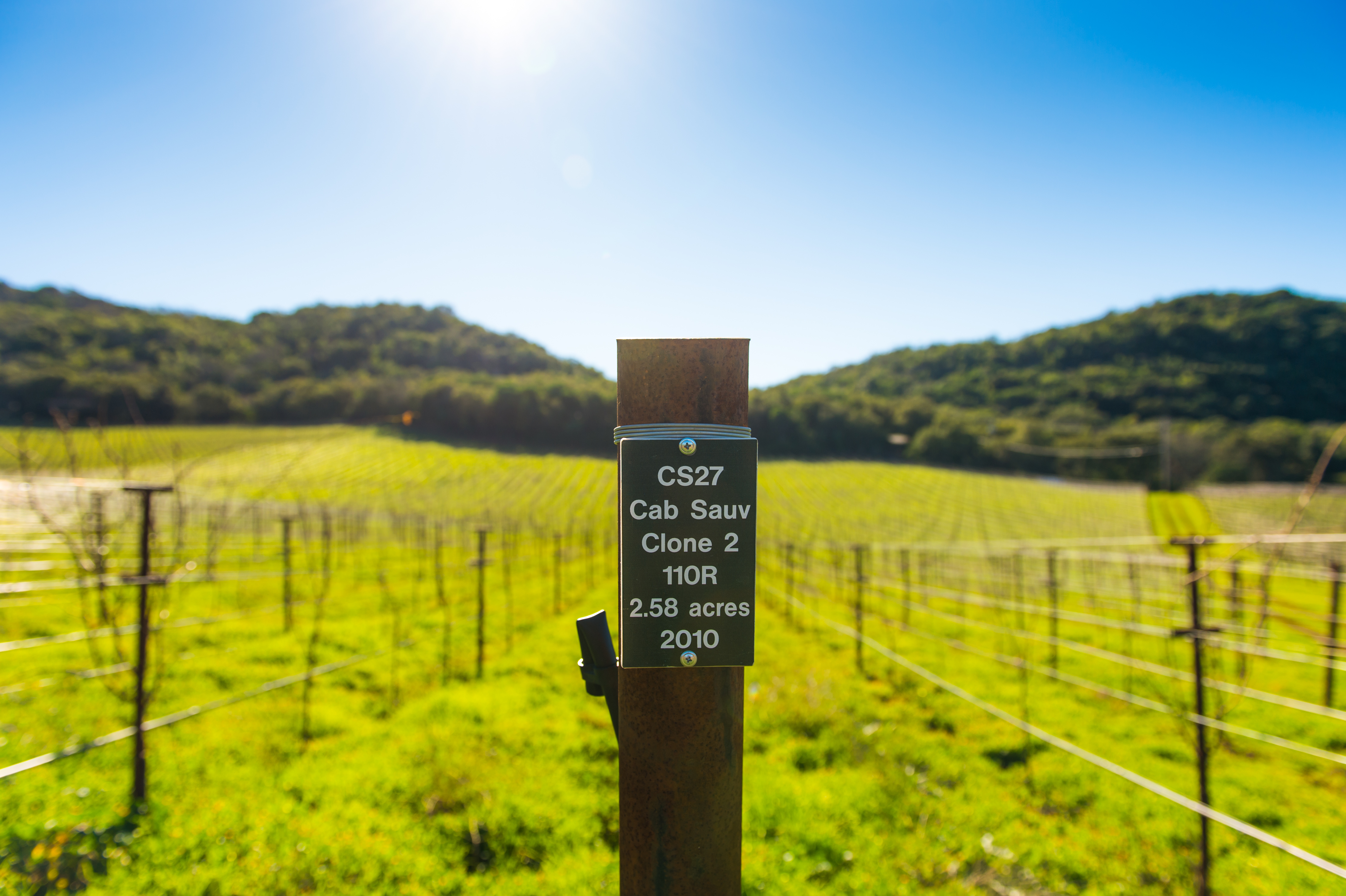
A vineyard in the Napa Valley showing which particular clone of Cabernet Sauvignon is planted in this block

Historically, massal selection was the primary means of vineyard propagation, particularly in traditional vineyards where vines are only sporadically replaced, often by layering a cane from a neighboring vine. In the 1950s, the isolation and identification of desirable clones in nurseries and breeding stations lead to an increase in clonal selection with new vineyard plantings seeking out clones from well established vineyards and wine region. This trend towards clonal selection has seen some criticism from wine writers and viticulturalists who complain about "mono-clonal" viticulture that has the risk of producing wines that are overly similar and dull.

Other criticisms of clonal selection involve the increased risk in vineyards lacking genetic diversity among its vines as well as the changing priorities in wine production. While many clones in the mid to late 20th century were isolated, some of the desirable traits exhibited by those clones (such as early ripening or high yield potential) may no longer be as desirable today where other traits (such as low yields and drought resistance) may be more prized.
