= Jacquère =

Variety of grape

- Grape (Vitis)
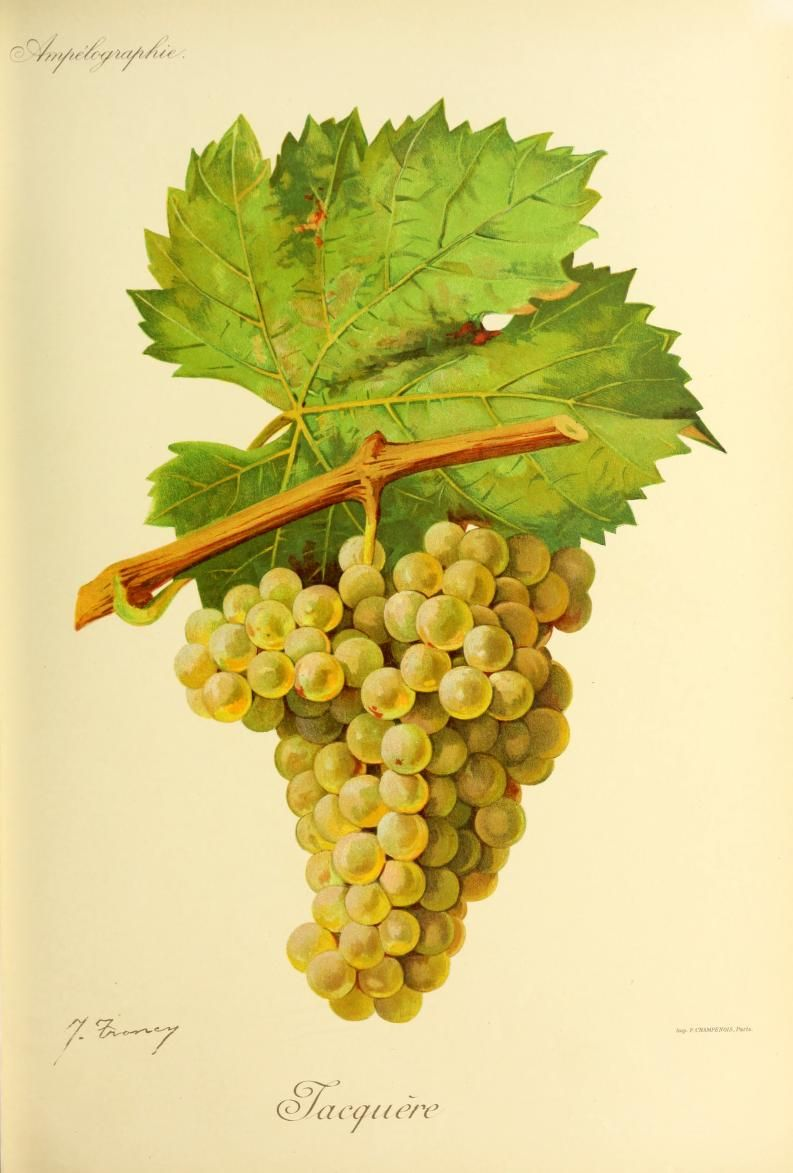
- Jacquère in Viala & Vermorel
- Color of berry skin: Blanc
- Species: Vitis vinifera
- Also called: see list of synonyms
- Origin: France
- Notable regions: Savoy
- Notable wines: Vin de Savoie
- VIVC number: 5604

Jacquère (French pronunciation: [ʒakɛʁ]) is a variety of white grape found primarily in the Savoy wine region of France. It is a high-yielding vine variety which is used to produce lightly scented, refreshing and gently aromatic dry white wine, such as Vin de Savoie. Jacquère is the grape used in Apremont wines and is the usual wine paired with cheese fondue (a dish from the same region). It is also found in Bugey wines.

Furthermore, Jacquère has been grown in some Condrieu vineyards, but it is officially not allowed to be used in Condrieu Appellation d'Origine Contrôlée wine.

After increased plantings in the 1980s, it has remained at a level of about 1,000 hectares (2,500 acres) in France since the 1990s.

== Relationship to other grapes ==
Gouais blanc has been secured as one of its parents, but the other is unknown. Jacquère is thought to be of French origin.

In the 20th century, ampelographers Louis Levadoux and (decades later) Linda Bisson categorized Jacquère as a member of the Pelorsien eco-geogroup along with Bia blanc, Béclan, Dureza, Exbrayat, Durif, Joubertin, Mondeuse blanche, Peloursin, Servanin and Verdesse.

== Synonyms ==
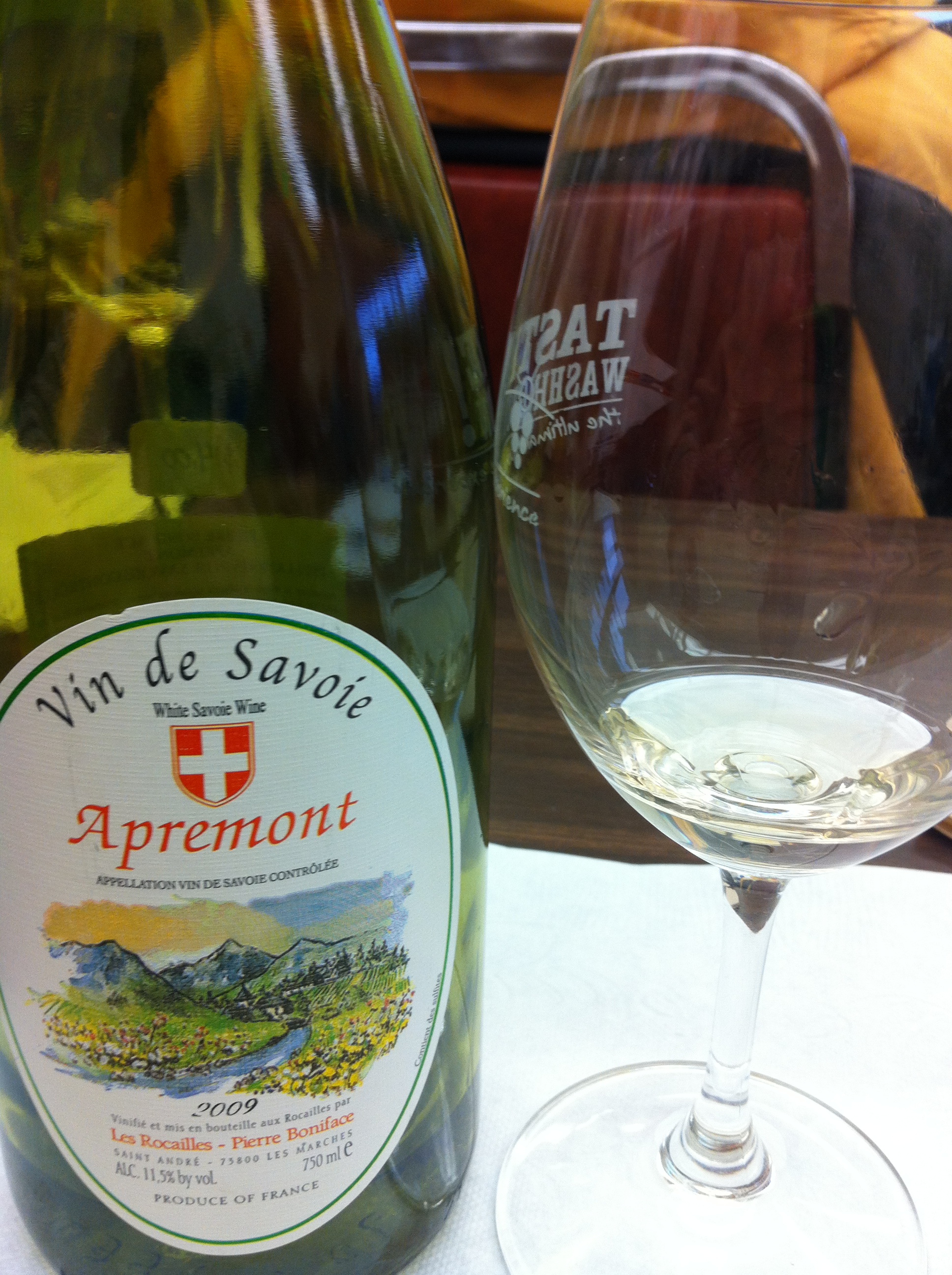
Vin de Savoie Apremont wine made from Jacquère.

Synonyms include Altesse de Saint-Chef, Blanc des Ecoutoux, Buisserate, Cherche, Coufe Chien, yCugnete, Cugnette, Cugniette, Jacquère Blanche, Jacquèrre, Jacquière, Martin Cot, Martin Cot Blanc, Molette de Montmelian, Patois Rossette, Plant de Myans, Plant des Abymes, Redin, Robinet, Rossettin, Roussette, Roussette de Montmelian.
