= Durif =

Red wine grape

Durif/Petite Sirah
- Grape (Vitis)
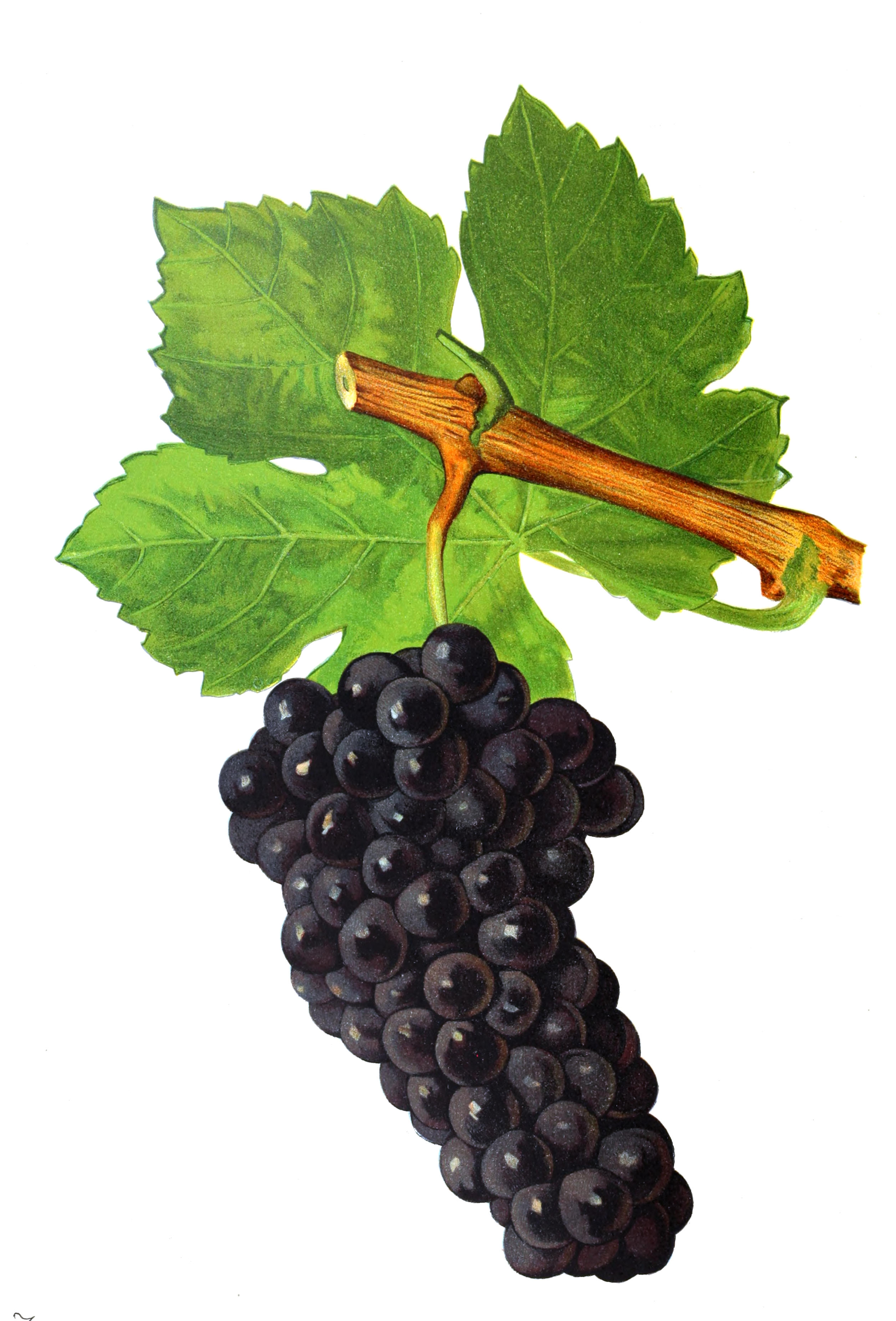
- Durif, colour plate from Ampélographie. Traité général de viticulture, Tome II (1901)
- Species: Vitis vinifera
- Also called: Duriff, Plant Durif, Plant Fourchu, Pinot de Romans and Pinot de l’Hermitage, Petit Syrah
- Origin: Montpellier, France
- Pedigree parent 1: Syrah
- Pedigree parent 2: Peloursin Noir
- Notable regions: Australia, California, France, Israel
- Breeder: François Durif
- Year of crossing: c. 1880
- VIVC number: 3738

Durif is a variety of red wine grape. The grape produces tannic wines with a spicy, plummy flavour. It originated from Syrah pollen germinating a Peloursin plant. On occasion, Peloursin and Syrah vines may both be called Petite Sirah, usually because the varieties are extremely difficult to distinguish in old age.

Durif is mainly grown in Australia, California, France, and Israel. Since the end of the 20th century, wineries located in Washington's Yakima River Valley, Maryland, Arizona, Texas, West Virginia, Chile, Mexico's Baja California Peninsula, and Ontario's Niagara Peninsula have also produced wines from Durif grapes. It is the primary grape known in the U.S. and Israel as Petite Sirah, with over 90% of the California plantings labeled "Petite Sirah" being Durif grapes. The U.S. Bureau of Alcohol, Tobacco, Firearms and Explosives (ATF) recognizes "Durif" and "Petite Sirah" as synonyms.

== History ==
In the 1860s the French botanist François Durif kept a nursery of several grape varieties at his home in the commune of Tullins where he most likely had plantings of both Peloursin and Syrah. At some point the two vines cross pollinated and Durif discovered a new grape variety growing in his nursery. It was identified and named Plant du Rif (later Durif) by ampelographer Victor Pulliat in 1868.

As a conclusion of DNA fingerprinting at the University of California, Davis in 1997, Syrah was identified as the source of the pollen that originally crossed with Peloursin flowers. The grape's high resistance to downy mildew encouraged its cultivation in the early 20th century in areas like Isère and Ardèche, although the relative low quality of the resulting wine caused the grape to fall out of favor with local wine authorities. Today, it is almost nonexistent in France.

== Regional production ==
Australia and California are now the two leading producers of Durif. The grape can also be found in Israel, Brazil, Argentina, Texas, Chile, and Mexico.

=== Australia ===
Confirmed as recently as 2024, old plantings of Durif continued to be used to produce popular wine in the Rutherglen, Victoria region of Australia. Durif is now grown in other wine regions of Australia, such as Riverina and Riverland, with over 740 acres (3.0 km^{2}) under cultivation by 2000.

=== United States ===
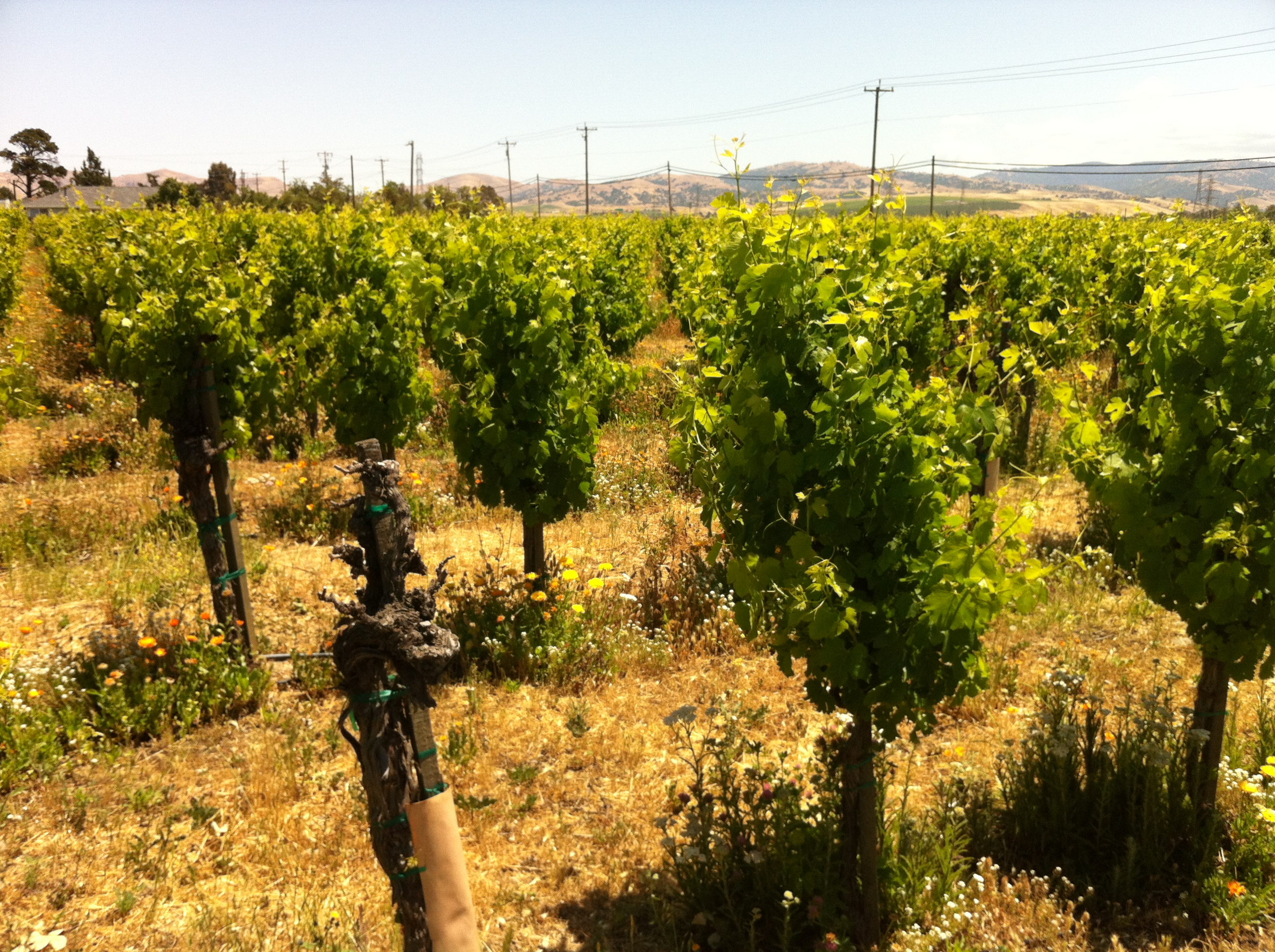
Petite Sirah plantings at Concannon vineyards in the Livermore Valley, California.

DNA fingerprinting has shown that the majority of Petite Sirah plantings in California are actually Durif. Some vineyards were found to be a field blend of Durif and other varieties, such as Mondeuse noire, all labeled as "Petite Sirah". The vine is a popular planting in Lake, Mendocino, Sonoma, Napa, Monterey and San Joaquin County. In addition to being produced as a varietal wine, the grape is sometimes blended with Zinfandel. In years when heavy rain or the excess sun has weakened the quality or yield of Cabernet Sauvignon or Pinot noir plantings, Petite Sirah may also be used as a blending partner to strengthen the wine. The average age of Petite Sirah vines tends to be older than that of most Californian vines.

As of December 2007, the TTB lists both Petite Sirah and Durif in 27 CFR § 4.91 as approved grape varieties for American wines, but they are not listed as synonyms. This means that U.S. producers can produce Durif wine, but not label it as Petite Sirah, and vice versa. The ATF proposed that they be recognised as synonyms in Notice of Proposed Rulemaking No. 941, published in the Federal Register on 10 April 2002, but a decision on RIN 1513–AA32 (formerly RIN 1512-AC65) appears to be postponed indefinitely, probably because the new regulation is tied up in the trade dispute that would see the TTB recognise Primitivo as a synonym for Zinfandel.

While not one of the officially sanctioned grapes of the Côtes du Rhône AOC, Petite Sirah's linking to Durif caused the California's Rhone Rangers to add the grape to its listings of wine in 2002.

=== Israel ===
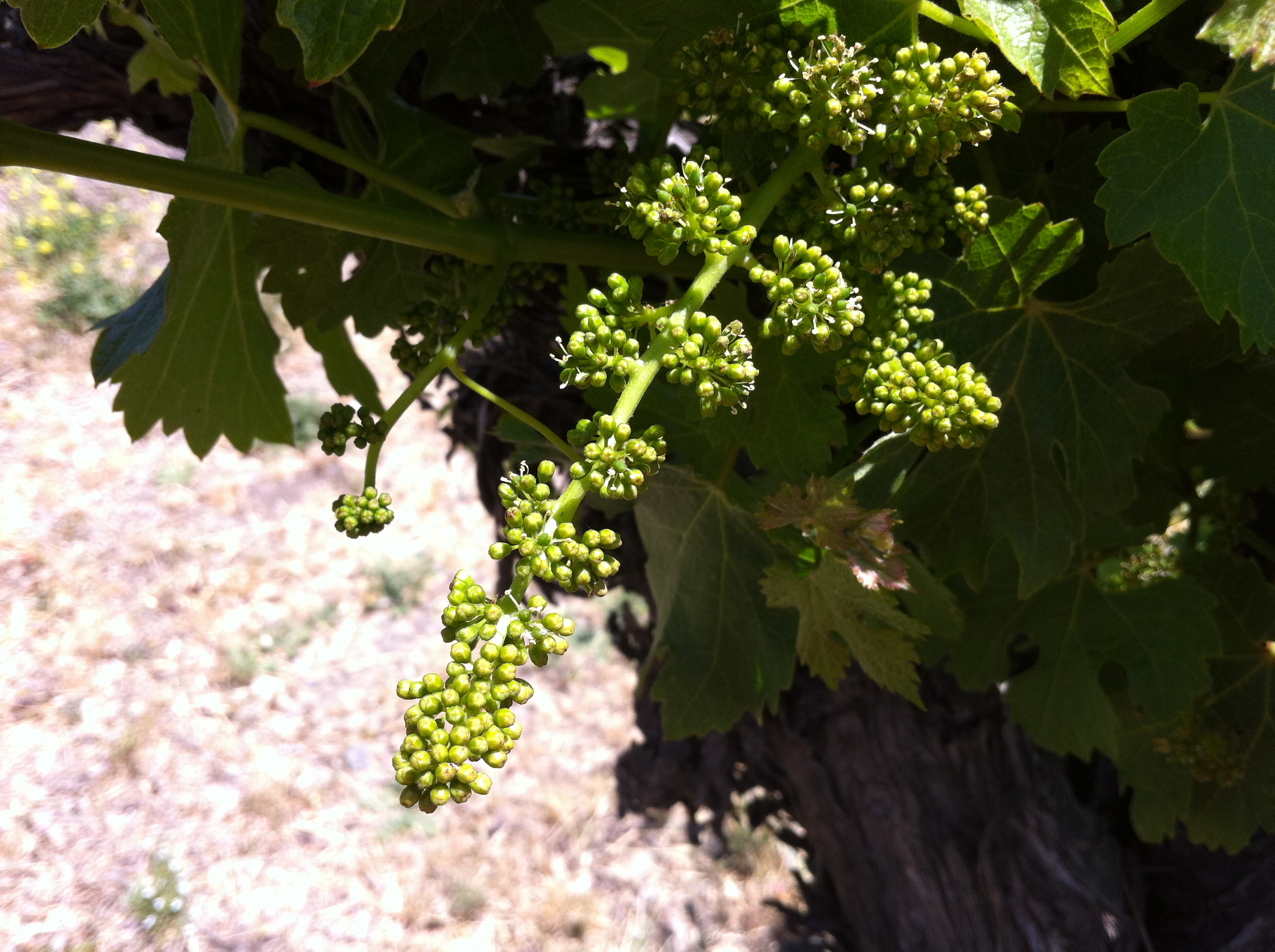
Petite Sirah/Durif in bloom.

In Israel, Petite Sirah had a history much like that in California—historically used as a blending grape to add body to inferior wines. However, Petite Sirah has recently experienced somewhat of a revival, both in high-end blends and bottled as a single or majority variety. The UC Davis-trained winemaker and Ph.D. chemist Ya'ir Margalit, familiar with the grape from his time in California, showed that Petite Sirah need not be consigned to jug wine when he blended small portions into his reserve Cabernet Sauvignon. In 2002 winemaker Assaf Paz made his first varietal Petite Sirah in his family winery Vitkin winery and in 2004 in Carmel winery where his was employed. Seeing that Israeli terroir could grow great Petite Sirah, wineries such as Lewis Pasco the founding winemaker at Recanati followed suit with a Petite Sirah/Zinfandel blend, while others like Sea Horse, Carmel, Tishbi have made single-varietal Petite Sirah in addition to using it for blending.

== Petite Sirah and Petite Syrah ==
Petite Sirah is sometimes mistakenly spelled "Petite Syrah," which has historically referred to a small berried clone of the Syrah grape by Rhône growers. In California, immigrant vine growers introduced Syrah in 1878 and used the phrase "Petite Syrah" to refer to the lower yields that the vines then were producing in California. Actual Petite Sirah (Durif) was then introduced in 1884.

== Viticulture ==
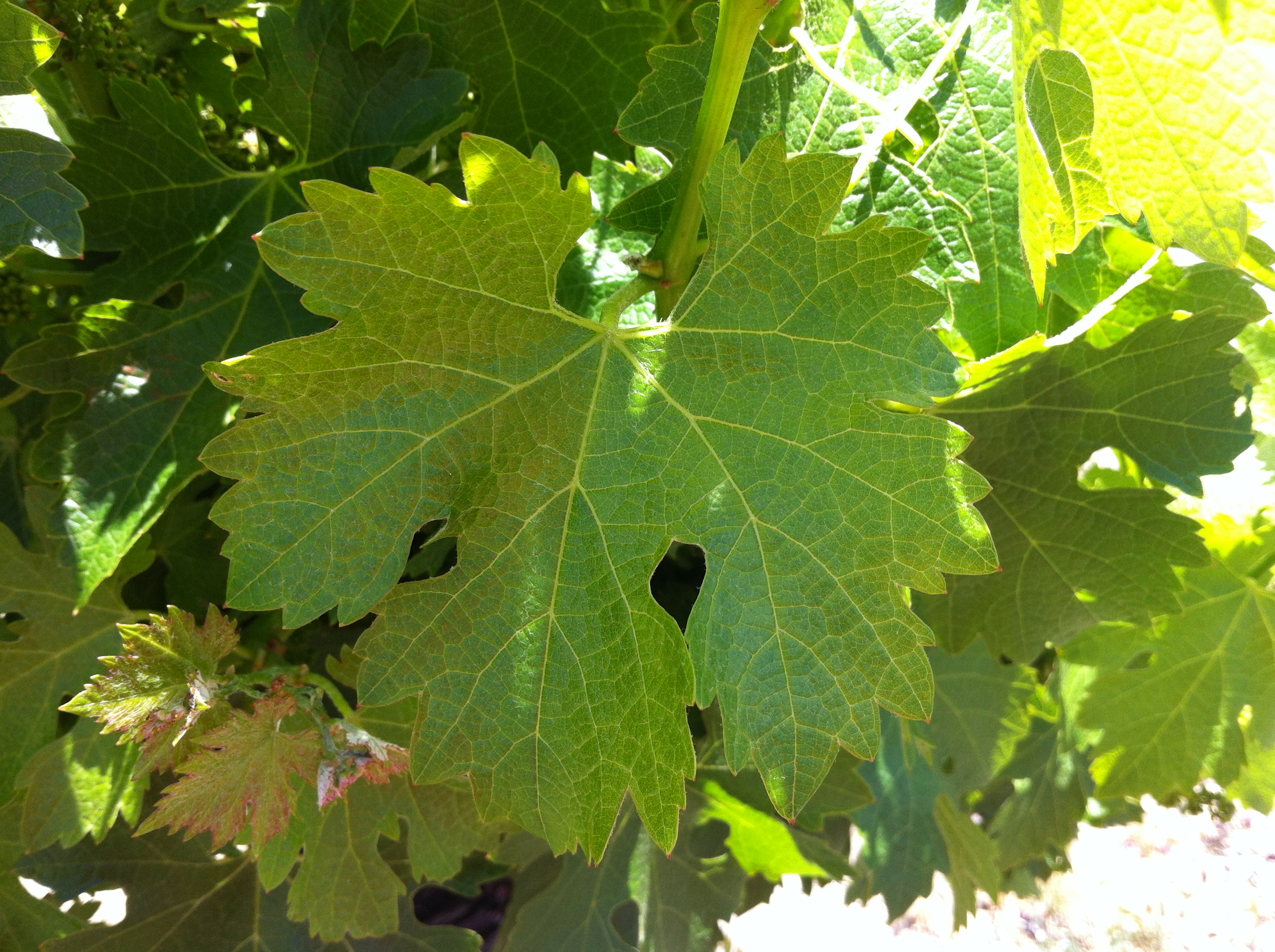
Durif leaf.

The "petite" in the name of this grape refers to the size of its berries and not the vine, which is particularly vigorous. The leaves are large, with a bright green upper surface and paler green lower surface. The grape forms tightly packed clusters that can be susceptible to rotting in rainy environments. The small berries create a high skin to juice ratio, which can produce very tannic wines if the juice goes through an extended maceration period. In the presence of new oak barrels, the wine can develop an aroma of melted chocolate.

In the 20th century, ampelographers Louis Levadoux and (decades later) Linda Bisson categorized Durif as a member of the Pelorsien eco-geogroup along with Bia blanc, Béclan, Dureza, Exbrayat, Jacquère, Joubertin, Mondeuse blanche, Peloursin, Servanin and Verdesse.

== Wine ==
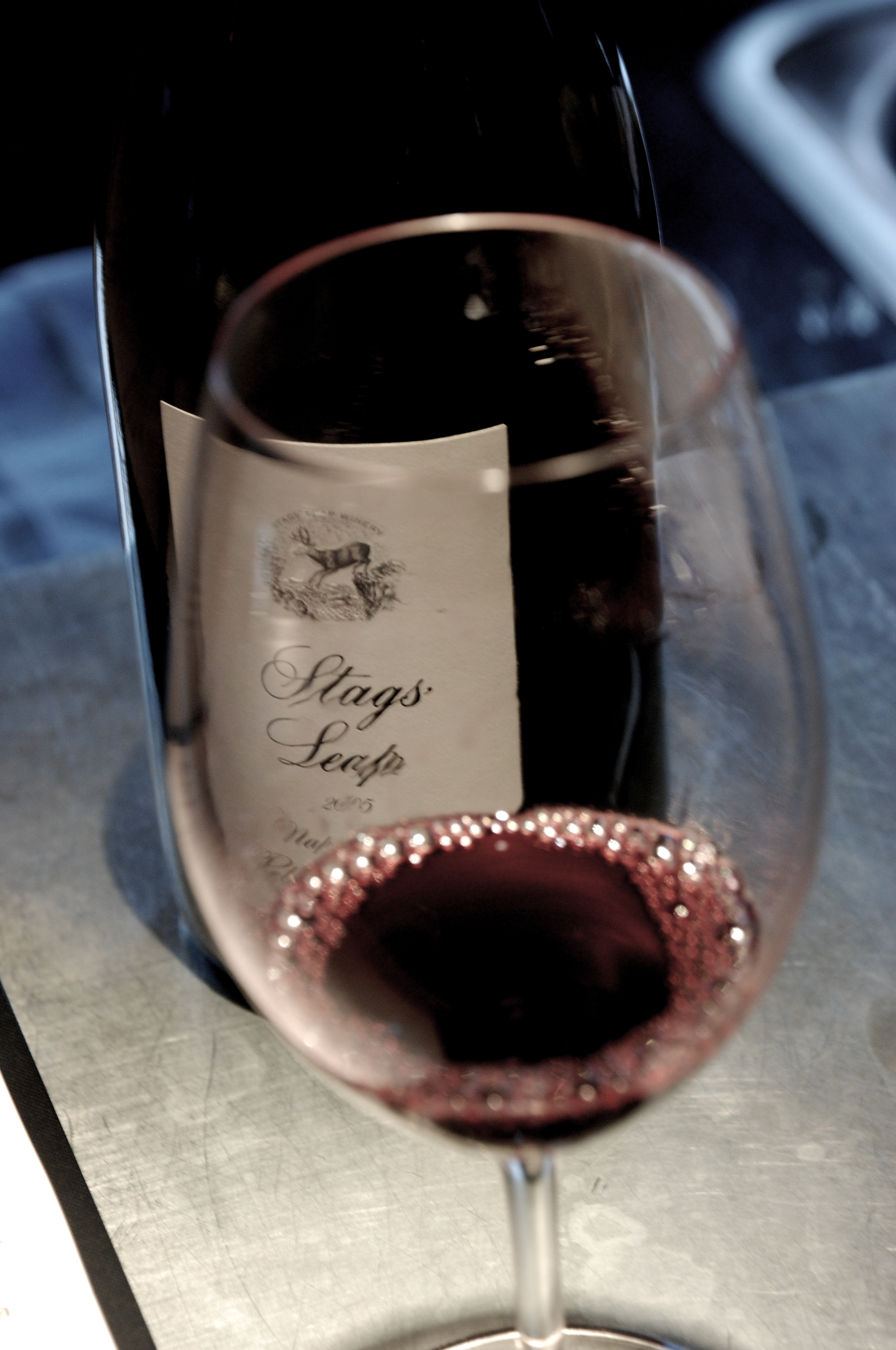
A glass of Californian Petite Sirah.

Petite Sirah produces dark, inky colored wines that are relatively acidic, with firm texture and mouth feel; the aroma has herbal and black pepper overtones, and typically offers flavors of blue fruit, black fruit, plums, and especially blueberries. The wines are very tannic, with aging ability that can exceed 20 years in the bottle. Petite Sirah can sometimes be rather "short", that is, the flavor does not linger in the mouth, hence the benefit of blending with another grape which may lack mid-palate depth, but adds length and elegance.
