= Joubertin =

Variety of grape

Joubertin is a red French wine grape variety that was historically grown in the Savoie wine region of southeast France. The grape was once prized for its productivity and high yields but its plantings have declined as the grape has fallen out of favor and it is now on the verge of extinction.

In the 20th century, ampelographers Louis Levadoux and (decades later) Linda Bisson categorized Joubertin as a member of the Peloursin eco-geogroup along with Bia blanc, Béclan, Dureza, Exbrayat, Durif, Jacquère, Mondeuse blanche, Peloursin, Servanin and Verdesse.

== Synonyms ==
Various synonyms have been used to describe Joubertin and its wines including Jaubertin, Pinot Joubertin, Plant d´Aix, Plant de la Claye and Plant de la Mure.
