= Syrah =

Dark-skinned grape variety

Shiraz (Syrah)
- Grape (Vitis)
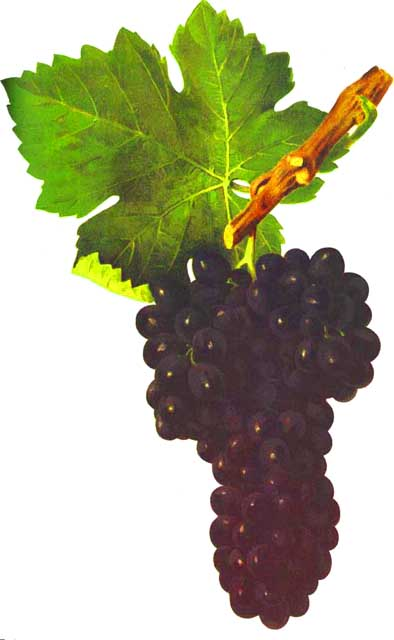
- The Shiraz grape cluster, illustration from Ampélographie (Viala et Vermorel, 1902)
- Color of berry skin: Black
- Also called: Shiraz, Hermitage, Antourenein noir, Candive other synonyms
- Notable regions: Rhône Valley, California, Texas, Columbia Valley, Grand Valley, Australia (Barossa Valley, Hunter Valley, McLaren Vale), New Zealand
- Notable wines: Côte-Rôtie, Hermitage
- Ideal soil: Stony granite
- VIVC number: 11748

Wine characteristics
- General: High tannins, high acidity, blackberry, dark chocolate
- Medium climate: Mint, eucalyptus, smoked meat, black pepper
- Hot climate: Liquorice, cloves, espresso, mocha, dark chocolate
- With age: Leather, wet leaves, earth

Syrah, (Note: IPA: /sɪˈrɑː, siːˈrɑː, ˈsiːrɑː/) also known as Shiraz, is a dark-skinned grape variety grown throughout the world and used primarily to produce red wine. In 1999, Syrah was found to be the offspring of two obscure grapes from southeastern France, Dureza and Mondeuse Blanche. Syrah should not be confused with Petite Sirah, a cross of Syrah with Peloursin dating from 1880.

The style and flavor profile of wines made from Syrah are influenced by the climate where the grapes are grown. In moderate climates (such as the northern Rhone Valley and parts of the Walla Walla AVA, a Washington wine region), they tend to produce medium to full-bodied wines with medium-plus to high levels of tannins and notes of blackberry, mint and black pepper.

In hot climates (such as Crete, and the Barossa Valley and McLaren Vale regions of Australia), Syrah is more consistently full-bodied with softer tannin, jammier fruit and spice notes of licorice, anise and earthy leather.

In many regions the acidity and tannin levels of Syrah allow the wines produced to have favorable aging potential.

Syrah is used as a single varietal or as a blend. Following several years of strong planting, Syrah was estimated in 2004 to be the world's 7th most grown grape at 142,600 hectares (352,000 acres).

It can be found throughout the globe from France to New World wine regions, such as Argentina, Chile, South Africa, the Hawke's Bay and Waiheke in New Zealand, California and Washington.

It can also be found in several Australian wine regions such as the Barossa Valley, Heathcote, Coonawarra, Hunter Valley, Margaret River, Adelaide Hills, Clare Valley and McLaren Vale.

== History ==
=== Origin ===
Syrah has a long documented history in the Rhône region of southeastern France, but it was not known if it had originated in that region.

A 1998 study conducted by Carole Meredith's research group in the Department of Viticulture and Enology at University of California, Davis used DNA typing and extensive grape reference material from the viticultural research station in Montpellier, France to conclude that Syrah was the offspring of the grape varieties Dureza (father) and Mondeuse blanche (mother).

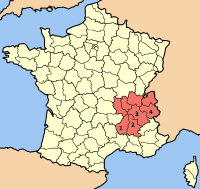
The Rhône-Alpes region. Dureza is believed to have originated in the Ardèche (#1) in the southwest and moved east/northeast into Drôme (#2) and Isère (#3). Somewhere in this area, most likely in Isère, the vine crossed with Mondeuse blanche, a variety native to the Savoie region (#4), to produce Syrah.

Dureza, a dark-skinned grape variety from the Ardèche region in France, has all but disappeared from the vineyards, and the preservation of such varieties is a speciality of Montpellier. Mondeuse blanche is a white grape variety cultivated in the Savoie region, and is still found in small amounts in that region's vineyards today.

Both varieties are somewhat obscure today, and have never achieved anything near Syrah's fame or popularity, and there is no record of them ever having been cultivated at long distances from their present homes. Thus, both of Syrah's parents come from a limited area in southeastern France, close to northern Rhône. Based on these findings, the researchers have concluded Syrah originated from northern Rhône.

The DNA typing leaves no room for doubt in this matter, and the numerous other hypotheses of the grape's origin which have been forwarded during the years all completely lack support in the form of documentary evidence or ampelographic investigations, be it by methods of classical botany or DNA.

Instead, they seem to have been based primarily or solely on the name or synonyms of the variety. Varying orthography for grape names render dubious any name-based evidence of origins. Nevertheless, origins such as Syracuse or the famous Iranian city of Shiraz had been proposed while the genomic studies had yet to be done.

The parentage information, however, does not reveal how old the grape variety is, i.e., when the pollination of a Mondeuse blanche vine by Dureza took place, leading to the original Syrah seed plant. In the year 77 CE, Pliny the Elder wrote in his Naturalis Historia about the wines of Vienne (which today would be called Côte-Rôtie), where the Allobroges made famous and prized wine from a dark-skinned grape variety that had not existed some 50 years earlier, in Virgil's age.

Pliny called the vines of this wine Allobrogica, and it has been speculated that it could be today's Syrah. However, the description of the wine would also fit, for example, Dureza, and Pliny's observation that vines of Allobrogica were resistant to cold is not entirely consistent with Syrah.

=== The names Syrah and Shiraz ===
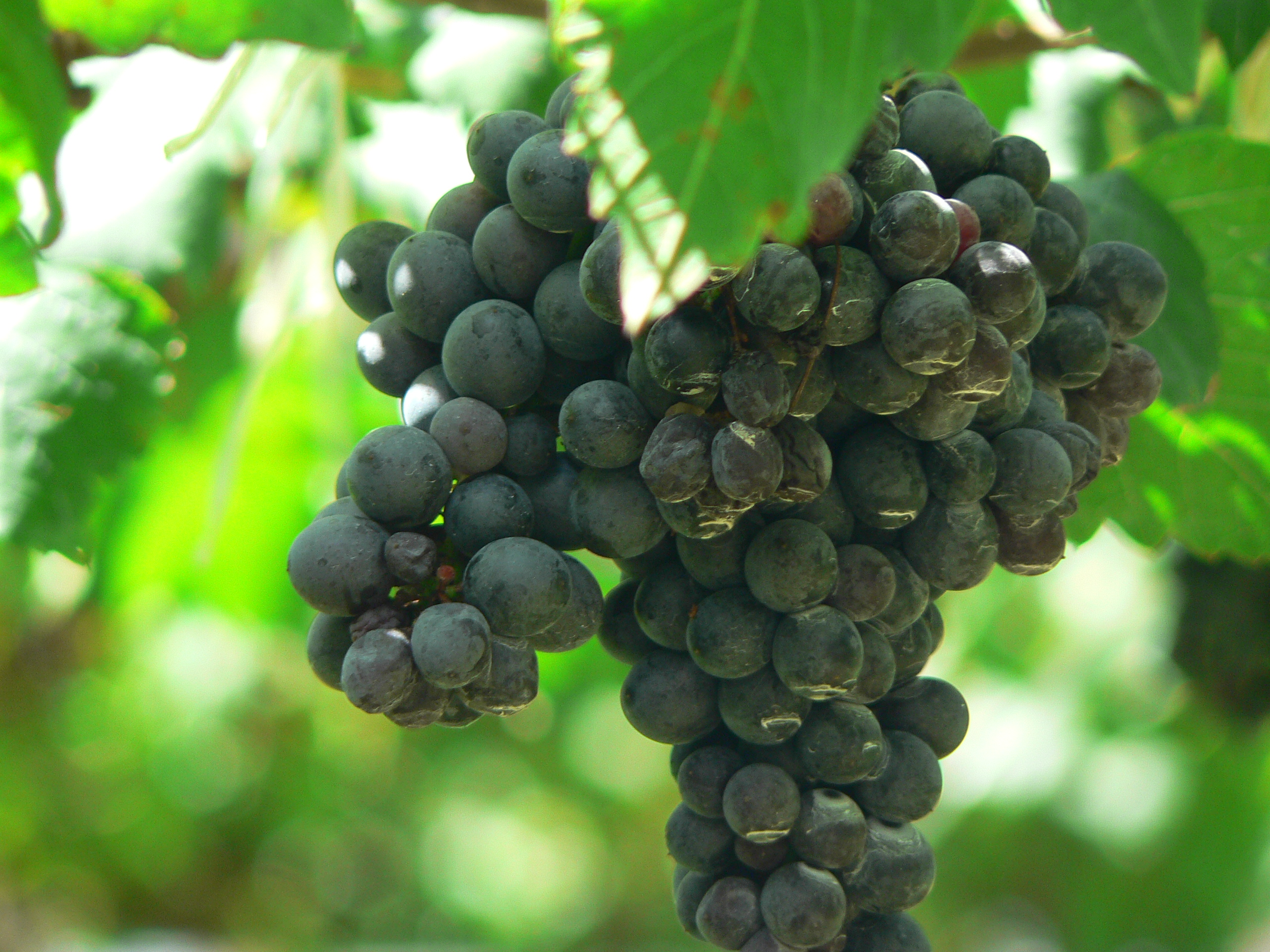
Clusters of Syrah grapes

The grape's many other synonyms are used in various parts of the world, including Antourenein noir, Balsamina, Candive, Entournerein, Hignin noir, Marsanne noir, Schiras, Sirac, Syra, Syrac, Serine, and Sereine.

Legends of Syrah's origins often connect it with the city of Shiraz in ancient Iran. The former capital of the Persian Empire under the Achaemenid dynasty produced the well-known Shirazi wine, and legends claim the original grape was later brought to the Rhône. At least two significantly different versions of the myth are reported, giving different accounts of how the grape variety is supposed to have travelled, differing up to 1,800 years in dating the event.

In one version, the Phocaeans could have brought Syrah to their colony around Marseille, then known as Massilia, an ancient Greek colony (apoikia) on the Mediterranean coast, east of the Rhône, which was founded around 600 BCE by the ancient Greeks. The grape would then later have spread to the northern Rhône, which was never colonized by the Phocaeans. No documentary evidence exists to back up this legend, and it also requires the variety to later vanish from the Marseille region without leaving any trace.

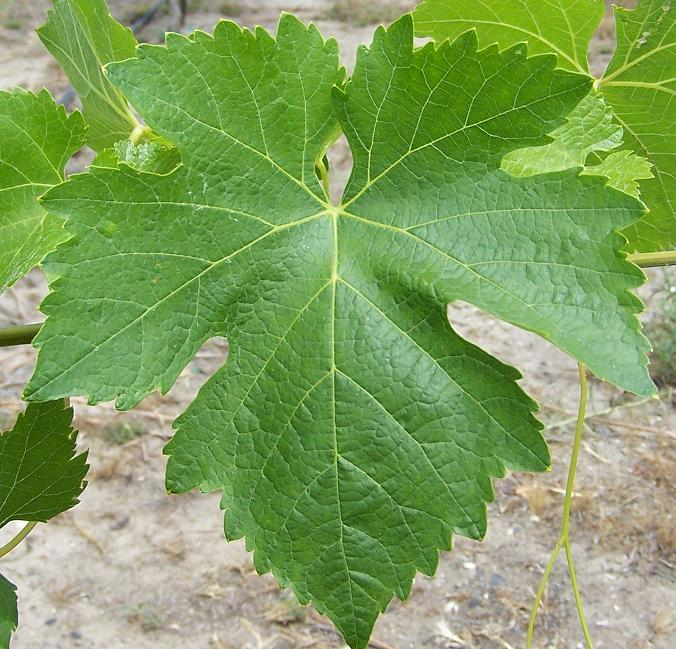
Syrah leaf

The legend connecting Syrah's origins with the city of Shiraz in ancient Iran may, however, be of French origin. James Busby wrote in his Journal of a recent visit to the principal vineyards of Spain and France an excerpt from the 1826 book Œnologie Française; "according to the tradition of the neighbourhood, the plant [Scyras] was originally brought from Shiraz in Persia, by one of the hermits of the mountain" called Gaspare de Stérimberg.

There is a connection between the name Syrah and the Persian word "سیاه" (pronounced siah or syah, meaning "black"). It refers to the origin of this grape, which comes from black grapes and shows connection between the city of Shiraz and this grape. Another legend of the grape variety's origin, based on the name Syrah, is that it was brought from Syracuse by the legions of Roman Emperor Probus sometime after 280 CE. This legend also lacks documentary evidence and is inconsistent with ampelographic findings.

Another proposed etymology links it with the Proto-Celtic word *serra 'billhook', presumably because the billhook was used in pruning.

The name "Shiraz" has been used primarily in Australia in modern times, where it has long been established as the most grown dark-skinned variety. In Australia, it was also commonly called Hermitage up to the late 1980s, but since that name became a French Protected Designation of Origin, this naming practice caused a problem in some export markets and was dropped. The name "Scyras" was used to describe the grape in the earliest Australian documents, and "Shiraz" has been speculated (among others by Jancis Robinson) to have come about through the bastardisation of the original word. However, while the names "Shiraz" and "Hermitage" gradually replaced "Scyras" in Australia from the mid-19th century, the spelling "Shiraz" has also been documented in British sources back to at least the 1830s. So while the name or spelling "Shiraz" may be an effect of the English language on a French name, there is no evidence that it actually originated in Australia, although it was definitely the Australian usage and the Australian wines that made the use of this name popular.

=== Rise to fame ===
The wines that made Syrah famous were those from Hermitage, the hill above the town Tain-l'Hermitage in northern Rhône, where an hermitage (chapel) was built on the top, and where De Stérimberg is supposed to have settled as a hermit after his crusades. Hermitage wines have for centuries had a reputation for being powerful and excellent. While Hermitage was quite famous in the 18th and 19th centuries, and attracted interest from foreign oenophiles, such as Bordeaux enthusiast Thomas Jefferson, it lost ground and foreign attention in the first half of the 20th century.

In the 18th and the first half of the 19th centuries, most Hermitage wine that left France did so as a blending component in Bordeaux wines. In an era when "clarets" were less powerful than today, and before appellation rules, red wines from warmer regions would be used for improvement (or adulteration, depending on the point of view) of Bordeaux wines. While Spanish and Algerian wines are also known to have been used for this purpose, top Bordeaux châteaux would use Hermitage to improve their wines, especially in weaker vintages.

=== Arrival in Australia ===
In 1831, the Scotsman James Busby, often called "the Father of Australian viticulture", made a trip back to Europe to collect cuttings from vines (primarily from France and Spain) for introduction to Australia. One of the varieties collected by him was Syrah, although Busby used the two spellings "Scyras" and "Ciras". The cuttings were planted in the Royal Botanic Garden, and in Hunter Valley, and in 1839 brought from Sydney to South Australia. By the 1860s, Syrah was established as an important variety in Australia.

=== Modern history ===
Syrah continues to be the main grape of the northern Rhône and is associated with classic wines such as Hermitage, Cornas and Côte-Rôtie. In the southern Rhône, it is used as a blending grape in such wines as Châteauneuf-du-Pape, Gigondas and Côtes du Rhône, where Grenache usually makes up the bulk of the blend. Although its best incarnations will age for decades, less-extracted styles may be enjoyed young for their lively red and blueberry characters and smooth tannin structure. Syrah has been widely used as a blending grape in the red wines of many countries due to its fleshy fruit mid-palate, balancing the weaknesses of other varieties and resulting in a "complete" wine.

From the 1970s and even more from the 1990s, Syrah has enjoyed increased popularity, and plantings of the variety have expanded significantly in both old and new locations. In the early 2000s, it broke into the top 10 of varieties planted worldwide for the first time.

== Shiraz wines ==
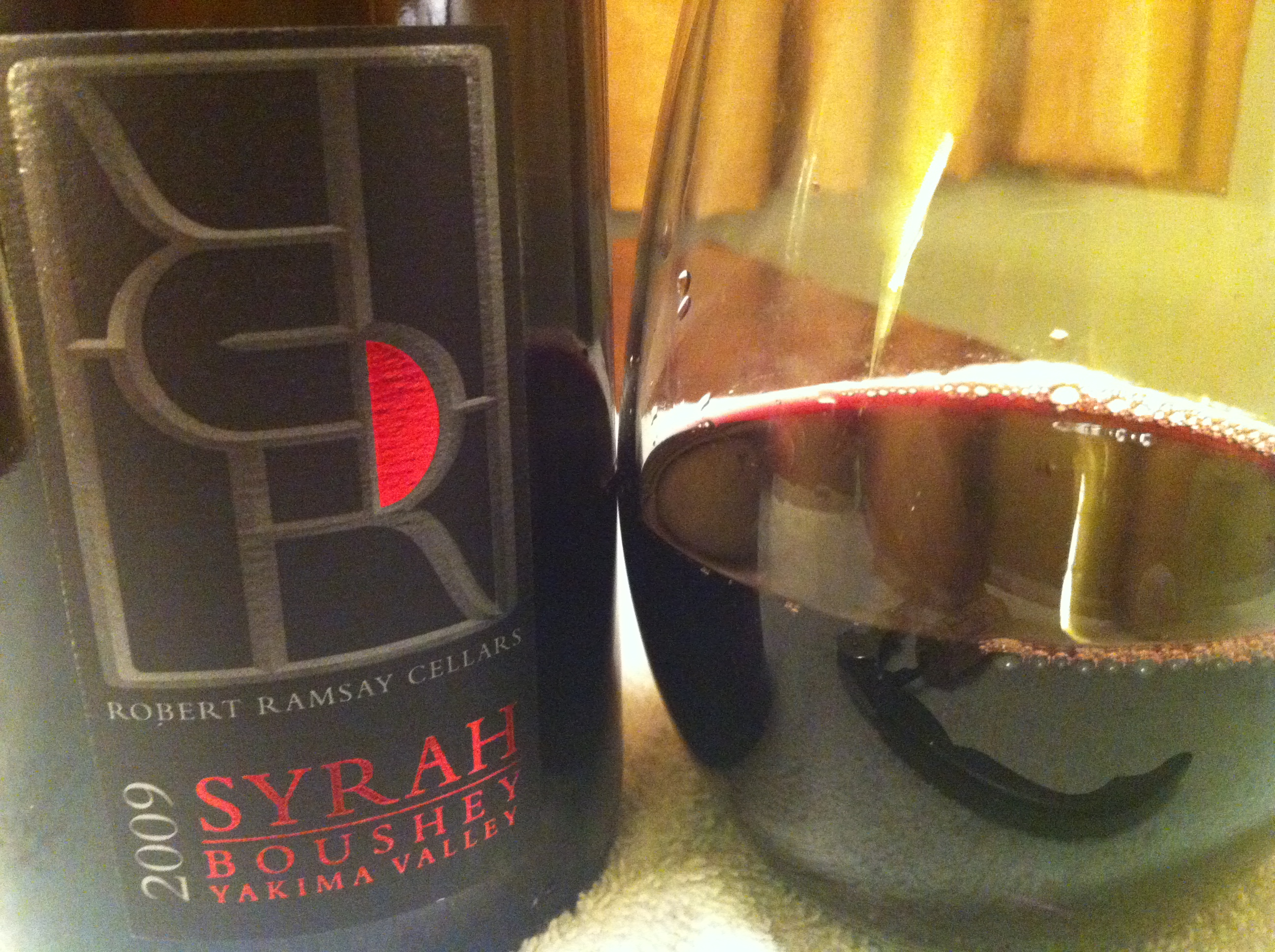
A Shiraz from Washington State

The name "Shiraz", from Shiraz in Iran, was historically applied to a wine unrelated to contemporary Shiraz wines and was made from a grape or grapes entirely different from the Syrah that has been proven to originate in southeastern France.

Smaller amounts of Syrah are also used in the production of other wine styles, such as rosé wine, fortified wine in Port wine style, and sparkling red wine. While Australian sparkling Shiraz traditionally have had some sweetness, a number of Australian winemakers also make a full-bodied sparkling dry Shiraz, which contains the complexity and sometimes earthy notes that are normally found in still wine.

Due to their concentrated flavours and high tannin content, many premium Syrah wines are at their best after some considerable bottle aging. In exceptional cases, this may be 15 years or longer.

Syrah has one of the highest recommended wine serving temperatures at 18 °C (65 °F).

=== Taste and flavours ===
Wines made from Syrah are often powerfully flavoured and full-bodied. The variety produces wines with a wide range of flavor notes, depending on the climate and soils where it is grown, as well as other viticultural practices chosen. Aroma characters can range from violets to berries (usually dark as opposed to red), chocolate, and black pepper. No one aroma can be called typical though blackberry, coffee and pepper are often noticed. With time in the bottle these primary notes are moderated and then supplemented with earthy or savory tertiary notes such as leather and truffle. Secondary flavor and aroma notes are those associated with several things, generally winemakers' practices (such as oak barrel and yeast treatment).

C13-Norisoprenoids such as 7,8-dihydroionone derivatives, such as megastigmane-3,9-diol and 3-oxo-7,8-dihydro-α-ionol, are found in Shiraz leaves.

=== Syrah or Shiraz on labels ===
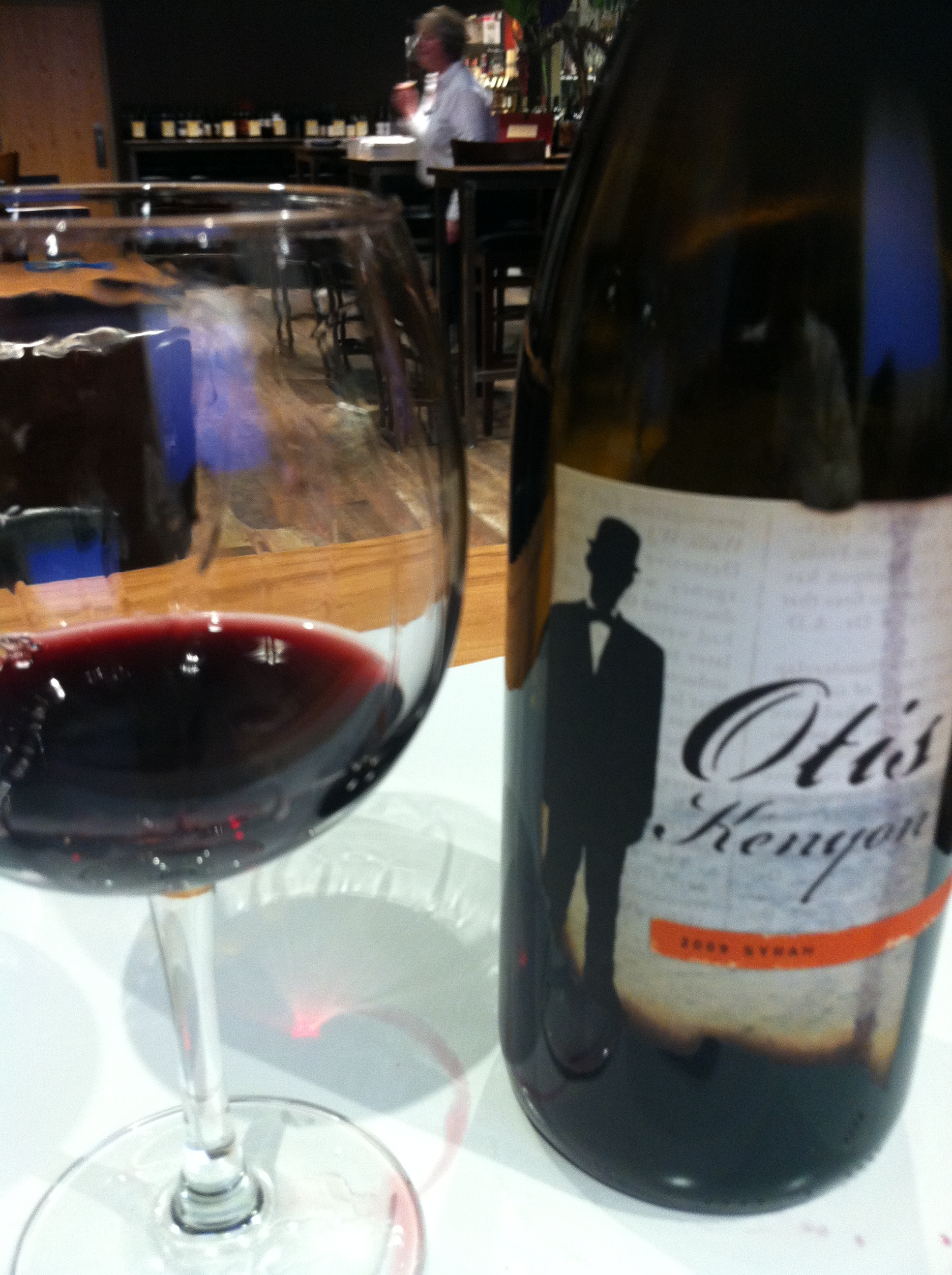
A New World wine labeled as Syrah

The Syrah-dominated appellations (AOCs) of northern Rhône have, like most other French appellations and regions, no tradition of varietal labeling of their wines. Indeed, such practices are generally disallowed under AOC rules, and only the AOC name (such as Cote-Rotie, Crozes-Hermitage or Hermitage) appears on the label. Varietal labeling of Syrah/Shiraz wines is therefore a practice that has emerged in the New World, primarily in Australia.

To confuse matters, in northern Rhône, different clones of genuine Syrah are referred to as Petite Syrah (small Syrah) or Gros Syrah (large Syrah) depending on the size of their berries, with Petite Syrah being considered the superior version, giving wines higher in phenolics.

As a general rule, most Australian and South African wines are labeled "Shiraz", and most European wines (from such regions where varietal labeling is practiced) are labeled "Syrah". In other countries, practices vary and winemakers (or wine marketers) sometimes choose either "Syrah" or "Shiraz" to signify a stylistic difference in the wine they have made. "Syrah"-labelled wines are sometimes thought to be more similar to classic Northern Rhône reds; presumably more elegant, tannic, smoke-flavoured and restrained with respect to their fruit component. "Shiraz"-labelled wines, on the other hand, would then be more similar to archetypical Australian or other New World examples, presumably made from riper berries, more fruit-driven, higher in alcohol, less obviously tannic, peppery rather than smokey, usually more easily approached when young, and possibly slightly sweetish in impression. It must, however, be realized that this rule of thumb is unevenly applied.

== Syrah in different countries ==
Syrah is a variety that during the last few decades has been imported for cultivation in several countries. It is primarily grown in warmer regions. Worldwide plantations of Syrah have increased considerably in the late 1990s and early 2000s, and both "Syrah"-labelled and "Shiraz"-labelled wines are on the increase.

It is grown in many wine producing regions around the world, with concentrations in Australia, The Rhone Valley in France, and the US. It is often used as a blending grape in Spain and Italy as well. It is also planted in Portugal, which favor making varietal Syrah wine, and not only blending with other types.

=== Italy ===
In Italy, Syrah is grown in Tuscany (i.e. Cortona DOC), Lazio (Pontine Agro), and Apulia (Syrah Tarantino IGT). Also a DOC Sirah Piedmont exists. The region though which has made one of the best uses of Syrah, by blending it with Nero d'Avola grapes, is Sicily.

=== France ===
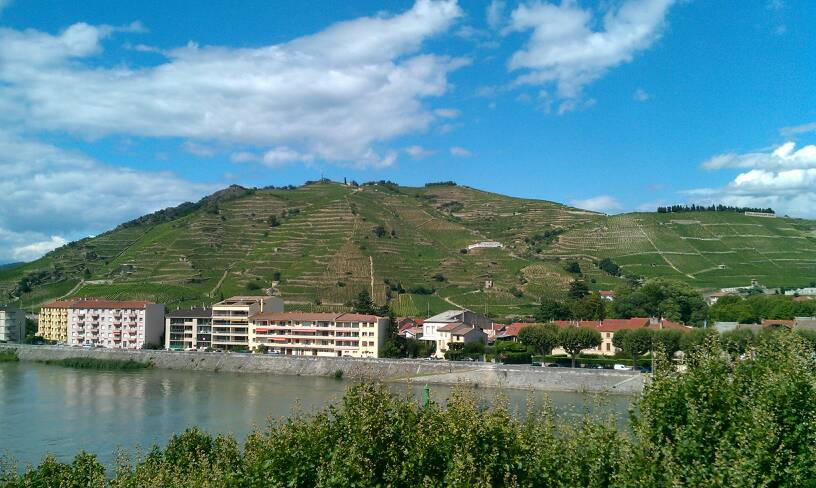
Vineyards on the Hermitage hill are dominated by Syrah.

Syrah, as it is known in France, is grown throughout the Rhône valley. The wines that are made from it vary greatly, even over small changes in the location of the vines. The differences in the soil quality as well as the changes in the slope of the terrain tend to produce different styles of wine. Ranging from the mineral and tannic nature of Hermitage, to fruity and perfumed in the case of Côte-Rôtie.

Syrah is also a key component to many blends. It may be used to add structure and color to Grenache in southern Rhône blends, including Côtes-du-Rhône and Châteauneuf-du-Pape. Syrah is also the only red grape used in the wines of the northern Rhône.

In 1968, there existed only 2,700 hectares (6,700 acres) of Syrah vineyards in France, primarily in the traditional appellations of northern Rhône, which at that time had not received much attention in the wine world for several decades, and the vineyards of which were not planted to full capacity. After the wines of northern Rhône were "rediscovered" by wine writers in the 1970s, plantings expanded considerably. This trend received an extra boost in the 1980s and 1990s, when influential wine writer Robert M. Parker Jr. awarded high scores, up to the "perfect" score of 100 points, to wines of some Rhône producers. The popularity of Australian Shiraz on the export market may also have played a role. In 1988, total French plantings stood at 27,000 hectares (67,000 acres), and the 1999 viticultural survey found 50,700 hectares (125,000 acres) of Syrah vineyards. France thus has the world's largest plantations of Syrah.

While previously unused parts of the northern Rhône vineyards have been planted with Syrah as part of the expansion, the major part of the new French Syrah plantations are located in southern Rhône (which covers a much larger vineyard area than the northern part) and Languedoc-Roussillon. While southern Rhône produces relatively few wines where Syrah is in the majority, the proportion of Syrah in the blended wines of this region has been on the rise. Languedoc-Roussillon uses Syrah to produce both Southern Rhône-like blends with Grenache, Australian-style blends with Cabernet Sauvignon, and varietal Syrah.

Syrah vines in France often suffer from a form of dieback characterised by the leaves turning red in late summer, deep cracks developing in the stem above the graft, and the premature death of the vine. The syndrome was first observed in 1990s in the Gard and Hérault departments of Southern of France, but is now widespread. It is believed to be caused by mismatch between the rootstock and scion rather than an infection by a fungus or a virus.

=== Spain ===
In Spain there was an increase in the area cultivated in Syrah grapes from 4,000 hectares (9,900 acres) in 1990 to 19,045 hectares (47,060 acres) in 2009. It is grown primarily in Castilla-La Mancha, with lesser amounts in Aragon and Catalonia. As of 2015 it was the seventh most grown red grape in Spain, with 20,155 hectares (49,800 acres) accounting for 4% of the red grape total.

=== Switzerland ===
The Syrah grape was introduced into Switzerland in 1926 and in 2009 was the 6th most common red wine grape in Switzerland (181 hectares). Mostly grown in Valais, along the upper Rhône valley above Lake Geneva, it produces "unexpectedly concentrated wine from mature vines".

=== Argentina ===
Syrah plantations in Argentina increased from less than 1,000 hectares (2,500 acres) in 1990 to 9,500 hectares (23,000 acres) in 2002. Syrah has occasionally been used as a blending component with Argentina's signature dark-skinned grape Malbec to provide an "Argentinian take" on the Australian Cabernet-Shiraz blend.

=== Australia ===
The Syrah grape was introduced into Australia in 1832 by James Busby, an immigrant who brought vine clippings from Europe with him, and it is almost invariably called "Shiraz". Today it is Australia's most popular red grape, but has not always been in such favour; in the 1970s, white wine was so popular that growers were ripping out unprofitable Shiraz and Grenache vineyards, even those with old vines. In the Barossa Valley, the world's oldest continually producing commercial vineyard is believed to be the Shiraz vines at Turkey Flat in Tanunda that were originally planted in 1847.

Many factors, including the success of brands like Lindemans (part of Treasury Wine Estates) and Jacob's Creek in the UK, as well as Rosemount in the US and UK, were responsible for a dramatic expansion of plantings during the 1980s and 1990s; a similar trajectory occurred in California. However, the biggest factor in this expansion during the 1990s was a steady increase in exports due to the historically low value of the Australian dollar.

In the 2005–2006 growing season, total Shiraz plantations in Australia stood at 41,115 hectares (101,600 acres), of which 39,087 hectares (96,590 acres) were old enough to be productive. These vines yielded a total of 422,430 tonnes of Shiraz grapes for wine production. This made Shiraz the most planted variety in Australia and Australia the world's second largest Syrah/Shiraz grower, after France.

Victorian regions include Heathcote, roughly 1.5 hours north of Melbourne. Cooler climate regions such as Western Australia's Margaret River produce Shiraz with marginally less alcohol content and often in a more traditional French style.

A well-known example of the Shiraz grape in Australian viticulture is the Penfolds "Grange". This wine was created by winemaker Max Schubert in 1951 and has a reputation for aging well. The Penfolds Grange is predominantly Shiraz but often includes a small quantity of Cabernet Sauvignon. It is usually a multi-regional blend of quality South Australian Shiraz, with the Barossa Valley playing an important role, and matured in new American Oak. Other well-known Australian Shiraz wines include the Henschke "Hill of Grace" and the Penfolds "RWT".

Recently, Australian Shiraz producers have started to add up to 4% Viognier to their Shiraz to add apricot tones to the wine's nose and palate. With such a small percentage added, the producer wasn't obliged to declare the blend on the label. In the past 5 years, however, it's becoming increasingly fashionable to label the wine "Shiraz Viognier" as Viognier gains consumer acceptance in the marketplace. The practise of blending Viognier with Syrah has actually been common for years in the Northern Rhône Valley region of Cote-Rotie.

"Shiraz" is also the S in "GSM" (Grenache-Shiraz-Mourvèdre), which is common Australian designation for a Châteneuf-du-Pape-like blend.

=== South Africa ===
South African plantations have expanded significantly, from 1% of the vineyard area in 1995 to 9.7% in 2007 making up a total area under cultivation of 9,856 hectares (24,350 acres). In South Africa, the variety is predominately known as "Shiraz", but the designation "Syrah" is used for "Rhône-style" wines. Some see this variety as the "great hope" for South African wines.

=== United States ===
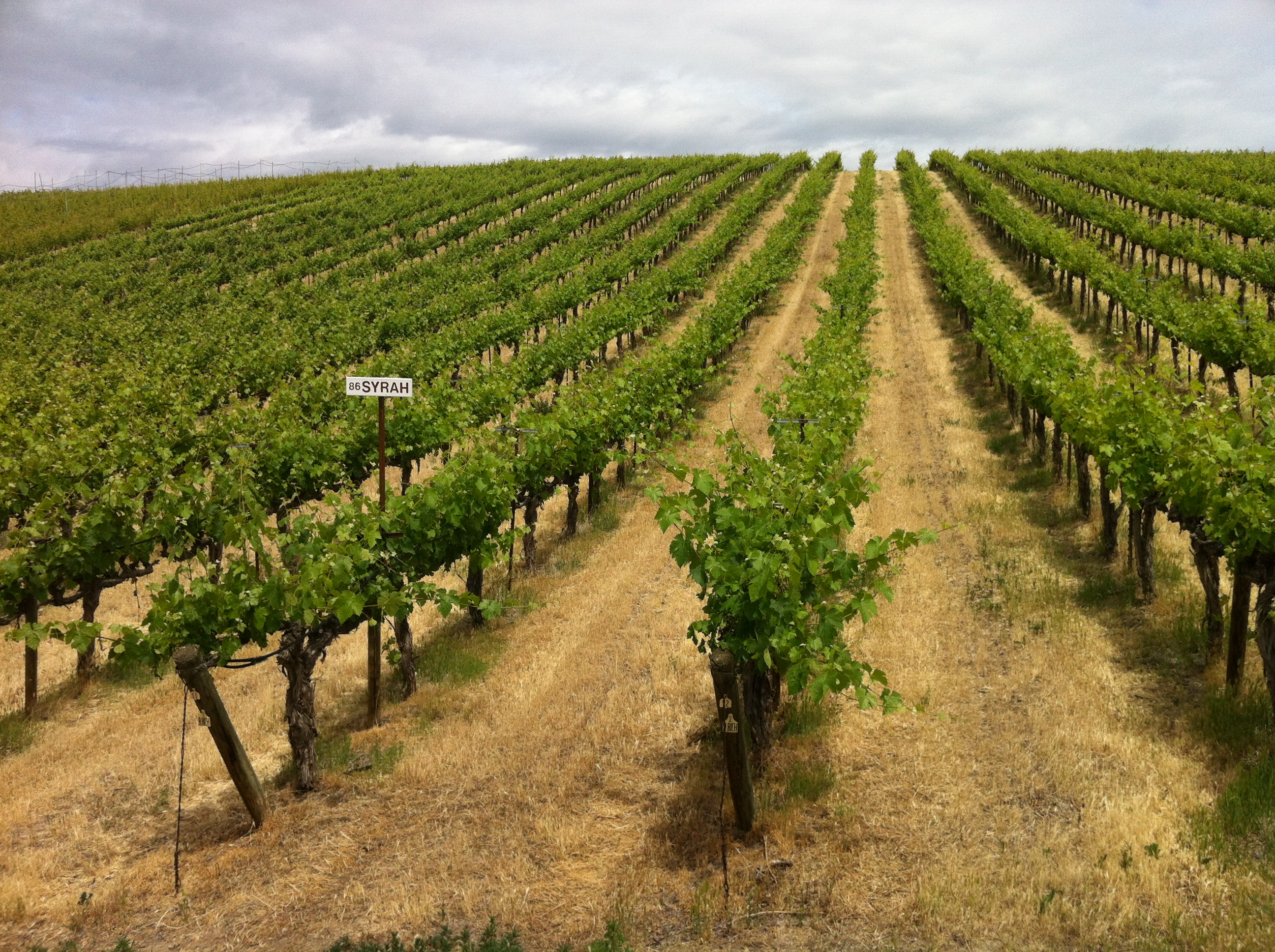
The first planting of Syrah in Washington state was done at Red Willow Vineyards in 1986.

In the United States, wine produced from the grape is normally called by its French name, "Syrah". However, in cases where winemakers choose to follow a New World style, similar to Penfolds Grange, they may choose to label their wines as "Shiraz". Under American wine laws, either name may appear on the label. Syrah first appeared as a wine grape in California in the 1970s, where it was planted by a group of viticulturists who called themselves "Rhone rangers". Although most plantings of the grape are in California, there are increasing amounts of it being grown in Washington state. Syrah makes up a significant percentage of wine produced in several Washington AVAs such as the Naches Heights AVA and the Walla Walla AVA. Syrah is increasingly being grown and produced in Oregon. Syrah is also found in small regions in Ohio.

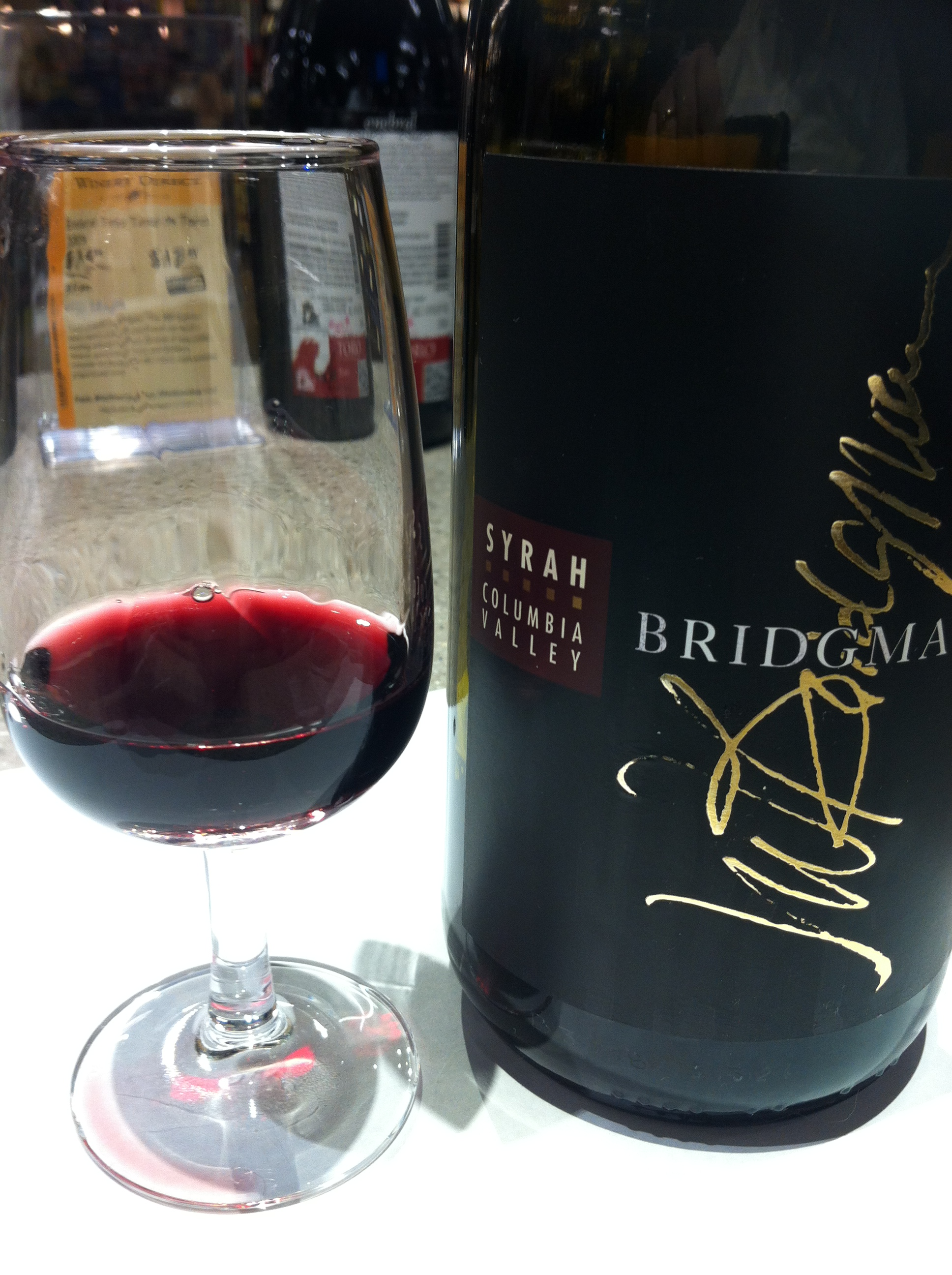
A Washington Syrah from the Columbia Valley AVA

California Syrahs, much like those in France, vary a great deal based on the climate and terroir that they inhabit. In exceptionally warm regions, such as parts of Napa, the wine is often blended with other Rhône varieties. Other appellations, primarily mountainous ones, tend to produce varietal-based wines that can stand on their own. Syrah was introduced into Washington state in 1986 by Red Willow Vineyard through their partnership with Woodinville, Washington-based Columbia Winery and Master of Wine David Lake. Expanding at a significant rate, it is used to produce single-varietial wines as well as being blended with grapes such as Grenache, Mourvèdre, Cinsault and Viognier.

=== Chile ===
Around 2005, there were 2,500 hectares (6,200 acres) of Syrah in Chile.

== Durif ==
Durif, or Petite Sirah, is a descendant of Syrah and Peloursin. It was propagated by and named after Dr. Francois Durif. Durif is a cross breed between the lesser known Peloursin and Syrah. Regions such as Rutherglen have achieved international regard for their Durif. This varietal is similar to Shiraz but is even more full-bodied and tannic because of the smaller, thicker-skinned grapes used. Petite Sirah is widely planted in California, where it is popular as a varietal (for example, by Bogle Vineyards), and especially blended with Zinfandel, which results in a rich, bold and fruity wine.

== Synonyms ==
Synonyms for Syrah include Antourenein noir, Candive, Entournerein, Hermitage, Hignin noir, Marsanne noir, Shiraz, Sira, Sirac, Sirah, Syra, and Syrac.

== See also ==
- International variety
