= Verdesse =

Variety of grape

- Grape (Vitis)
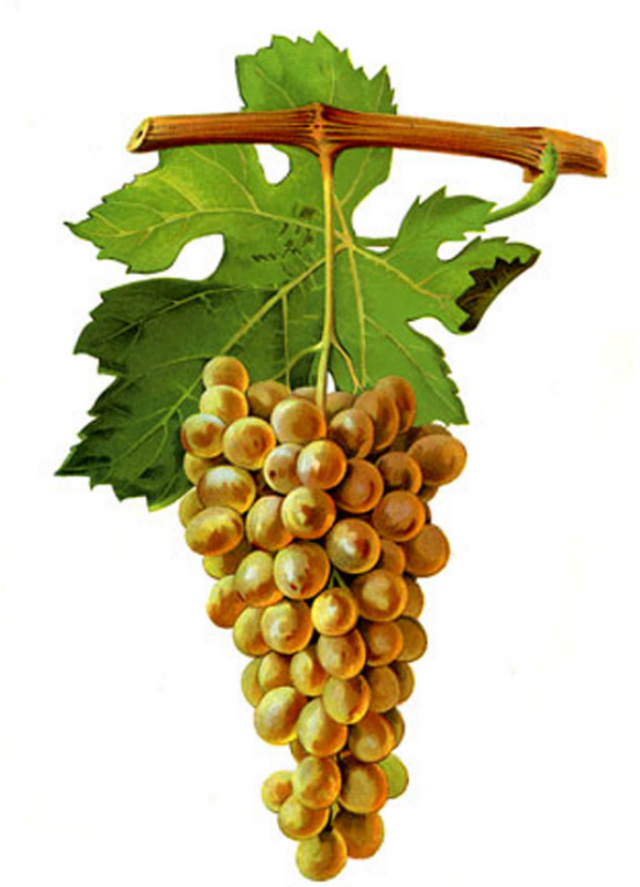
- Verdesse in Viala & Vermorel
- Color of berry skin: Blanc
- Species: Vitis vinifera
- Also called: See list of synonyms -->
- Origin: France
- VIVC number: 12960

Verdesse (French pronunciation: [vɛʁdɛs]) is a white French wine grape variety grown primarily in the Bugey AOC of eastern France (though it is not currently permitted in the AOC wine). It is also permitted under the Vin de Savoie AOC for wines produced in the Isère department up to a maximum allowance of 10%. Ampelographers believe that the variety is likely very old and originated along the Drac and Grésivaudan valleys in Isère.

== Viticulture ==
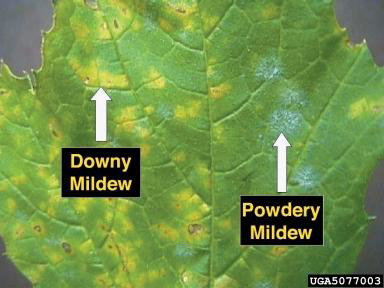
Verdesse is susceptible to powdery and downy mildew.

Verdesse tends to thrive in clay and limestone slopes. It has a high tolerance to botrytis but can be very susceptible to powdery and downy mildew. The grape tends to form small to medium, compact clusters that take on a conical shape with often a side-wing cluster. The berries tend to vary from greenish white to a golden yellow after veraison and may even take on an amber shade when fully ripe and sun burnt. The skin of the small to medium size, ellipsoid berries are usually very thick.

In the 20th century, ampelographers Louis Levadoux and (decades later) Linda Bisson categorized Verdesse as a member of the Pelorsien eco-geogroup along with Bia blanc, Béclan, Dureza, Exbrayat, Durif, Jacquère, Mondeuse blanche, Peloursin, Servanin and Joubertin.

== Wines ==
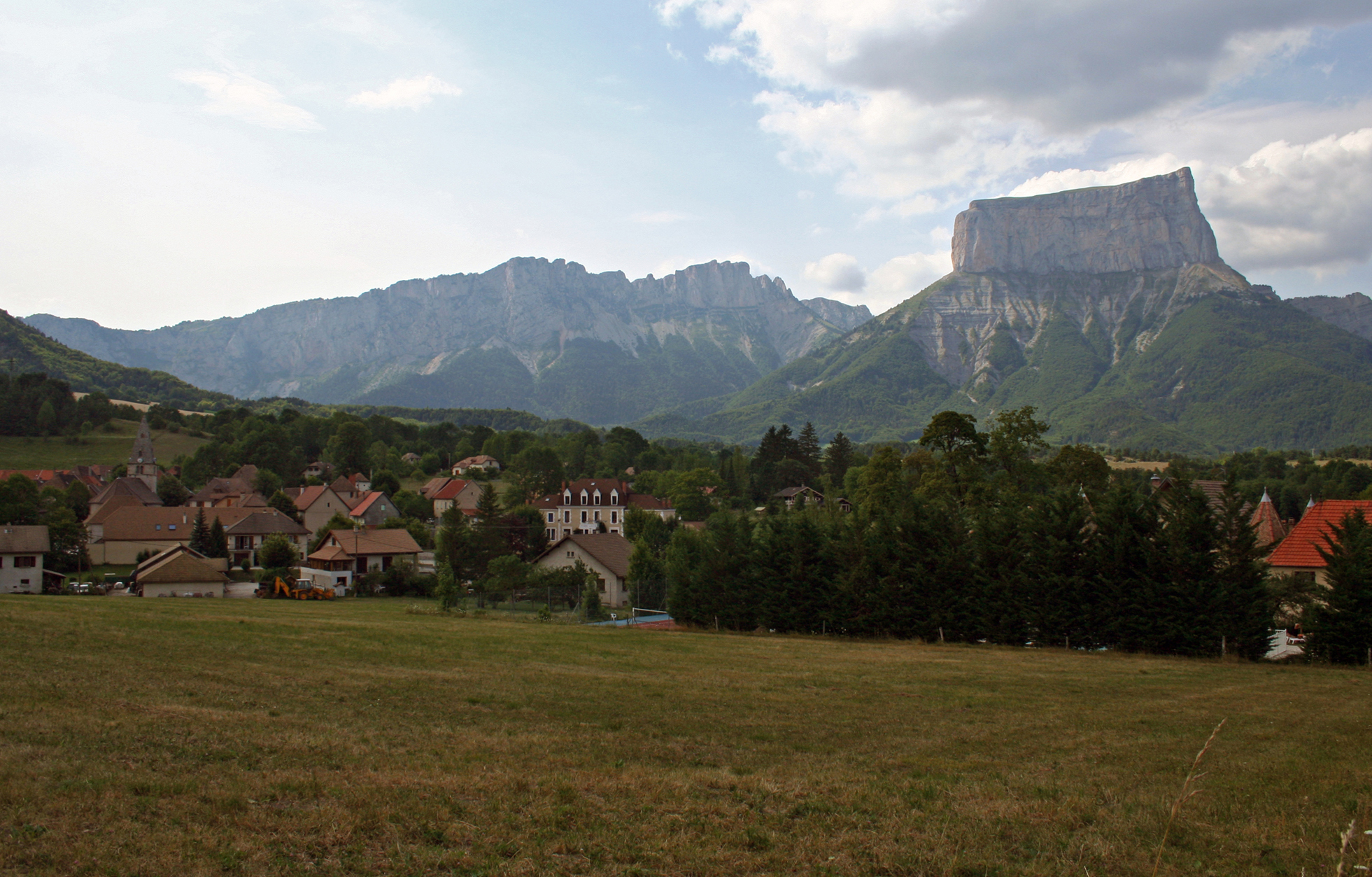
Verdesse is permitted in the white Vin de Savoie wines grown in the Isère department around communes such as Chichilianne.

The grape has the potential of producing full bodied, highly alcoholic wine with pronounce aromatics. Despite the inference of several of its synonyms, the aromas of wines made from Verdesse are usually not "musky".

== Synonyms ==
Over the years Verdesse has been known under a variety of synonyms including: Bian ver, Bian vert, Blanchette, Clairette de Chindrieux, Clairette précoce, Dongine, Etraire Blanche, Verdasse, Verdea, Verdêche, Verdesse Muscade, Verdeze musqué and Verdeze musquée.
