= Dureza =

Variety of grape

- Grape (Vitis)
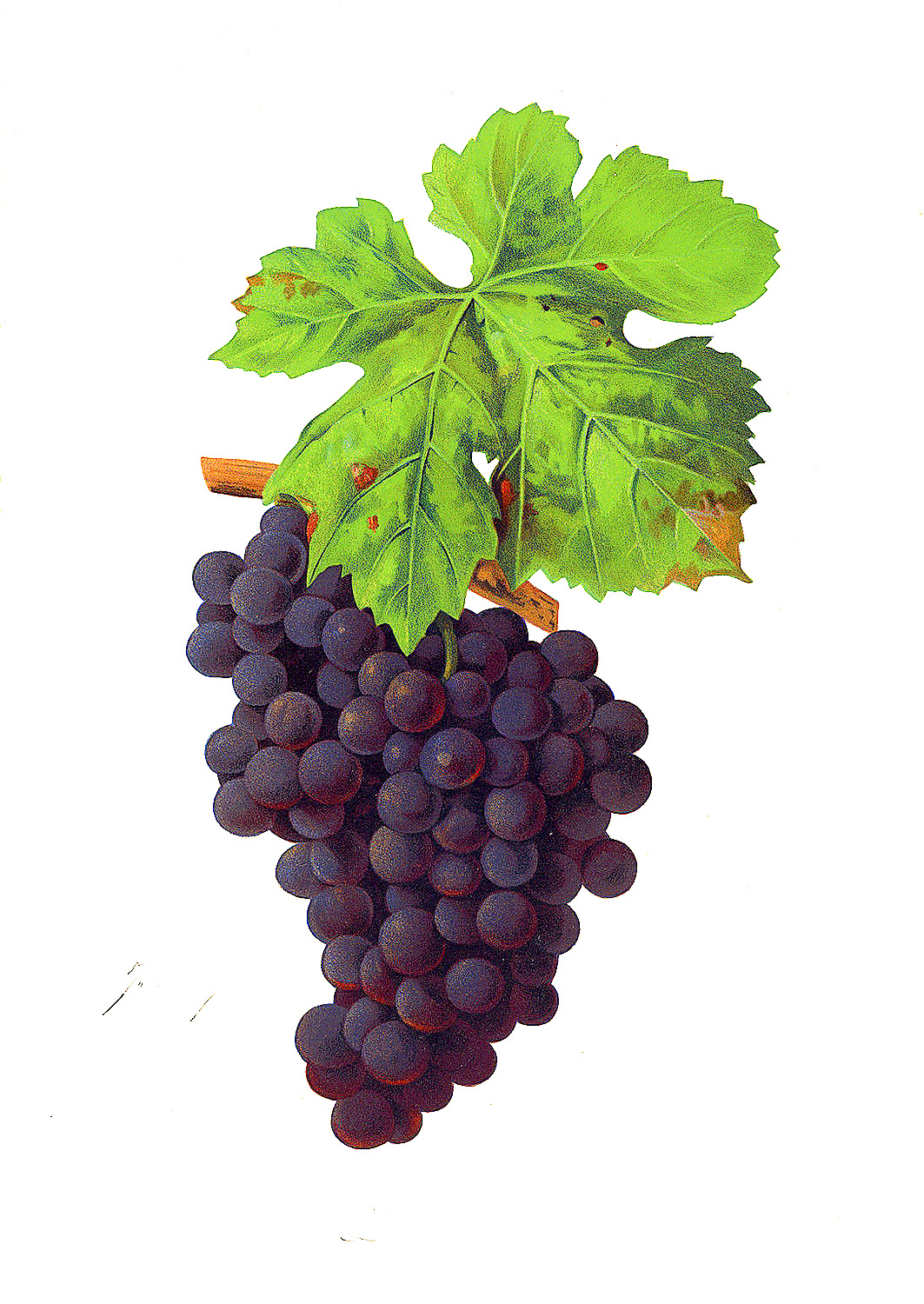
- Dureza grapes
- Species: Vitis vinifera
- Also called: Duret, Petite Duret
- Origin: Ardèche, France
- VIVC number: 22231

Dureza is a dark-skinned French wine grape variety from the Ardèche department of south central France in the Auvergne-Rhône-Alpes region. The grape is most widely known for being the father vine of Syrah—a discovery that confirmed that the Syrah vine was native to France and not introduced to the country from Persia, Sicily, Egypt or elsewhere, as had been speculated.

Dureza was historically used for production of red wine, but is hardly grown any more and is not part of the list of the allowed grape varieties of any French Appellation d'origine contrôlée wine, though it can be produced under some vin de pays. There were only 11 hectares planted to Dureza in the late 1970s: by 1988 only one hectare remained. However, since the variety's relationship to Syrah was revealed, interest in Dureza has been increasing: Pascal Jamet has introduced plantings of the grape to the Saint-Joseph AOC in the northern Rhône Valley, for wine to be made under the appellation of Collines Rhodaniennes vin de pays.

== History ==
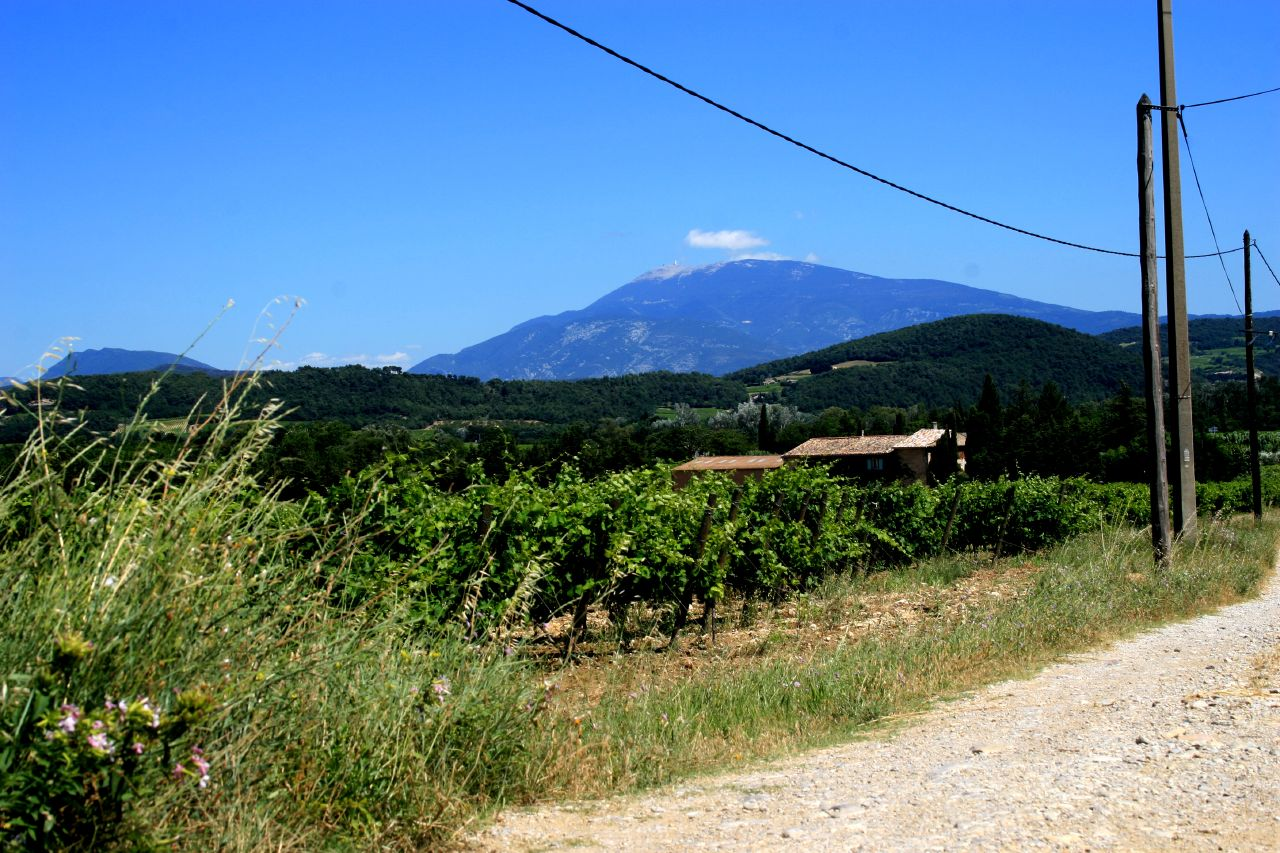
A vineyard in the Ardèche region where Dureza is believed to have originated.

The Dureza vine is a member of the Vitis vinifera family of grape vines. It is believed to be native to the northern Ardèche region of south-central France. At some point the vine spread eastward towards the Drôme and Isère regions, for it was here that the variety likely came in contact with the Savoie wine grape Mondeuse Blanche where the two varieties created a natural crossing that became the international variety Syrah.

== Relationship to Syrah and other varieties ==
In 1998, DNA typing conducted at both the University of California-Davis and at the Institut National de la Recherche Agronomique in Montpellier established that Dureza was the father of the Syrah grape, with Mondeuse Blanche the mother.

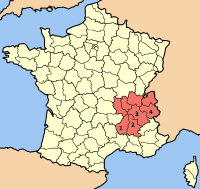
The Rhône-Alpes region. Dureza is believed to have originated in the Ardèche (#1) in the southwest and moved east/northeast into Drôme (#2) and Isère (#3). Somewhere in this area, most likely in Isère, the vine crossed with Mondeuse Blanche, a variety native to the Savoie region (#4), to produce Syrah.

Mondeuse Blanche is native to the Savoie region, though it has been found in the Ain, Haute-Savoie and Isère departments. The DNA evidence showing that Dureza, an Ardèche variety, and Mondeuse Blanche were the parent vines of Syrah helped to confirm that Syrah was an indigenous French grape variety that originated somewhere in the Rhône-Alpes region; grape geneticist Dr. Carole Meredith speculates that the northern Isère region was the likely birthplace.

DNA mapping has also revealed some relationship to the Italian wine grape variety Lagrein grown in the Trentino-Alto Adige/Südtirol region of northeast Italy, though the exact relationship is unclear. The most recent research from Swiss grape geneticist Dr. José Vouillamoz, completed in 2006, suggests that Dureza might be an "uncle" to Lagrein and connected together by another red Italian wine grape, Teroldego.

In the 20th century, ampelographers Louis Levadoux and (decades later) Linda Bisson categorized Dureza as a member of the Pelorsien eco-geogroup along with Bia blanc, Béclan, Durif, Exbrayat, Jacquère, Joubertin, Mondeuse blanche, Peloursin, Servanin and Verdesse.

== Viticulture ==
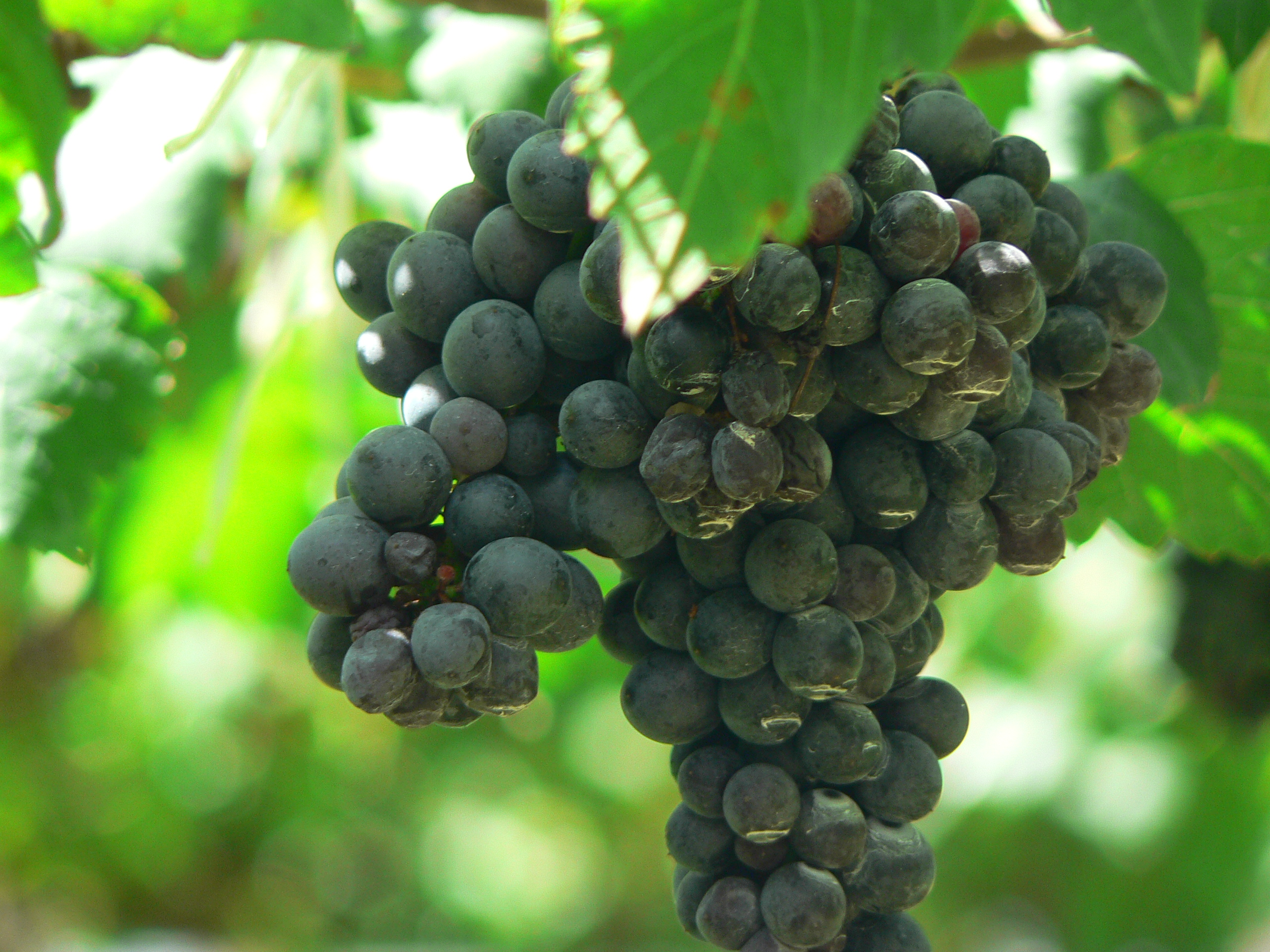
Syrah.

Dureza is known as a vigorous vine, capable of producing high yields. The variety tends to ripen late in the season, which linguist Jacques André and ampelographer Louis Levadoux have noted may account for the synonyms Serène and Serine attached to the variety. Both synonyms, which are now more closely related to Dureza's similarly late-ripening offspring Syrah, are connected to the root of the Latin term serus, "late".

== Synonyms and confusion with other grapes ==
Dureza is also known under the synonyms Duré, Duret, Durezza (when grown in the Annonay commune of the Ardèche) and Petite Duret (in the Drôme and Isère departments). Historically it has also been known as Serène and Serine which are more widely recognized as synonyms for its offspring Syrah used in the Côte-Rôtie AOC.

Dureza has sometimes been confused with Durif (which is also known as Petit Sirah), Peloursin (which is known under the synonyms Duresa, Dureza and Durezi) and Syrah.
