= Peloursin =

Variety of grape

Peloursin Noir
- Grape (Vitis)
- Color of berry skin: Black
- Species: Vitis vinifera
- Also called: See (Synonyms).
- Origin: France
- VIVC number: 9107

Peloursin is red French wine grape variety best known for crossing with Syrah to make the red wine grape Durif (known in the United States as Petite Sirah). The variety is believed to have originated in Isère from the northern Rhône-Alpes region. Today Peloursin can be found in some quantities in California and in the Australia wine region of Victoria.

== History ==
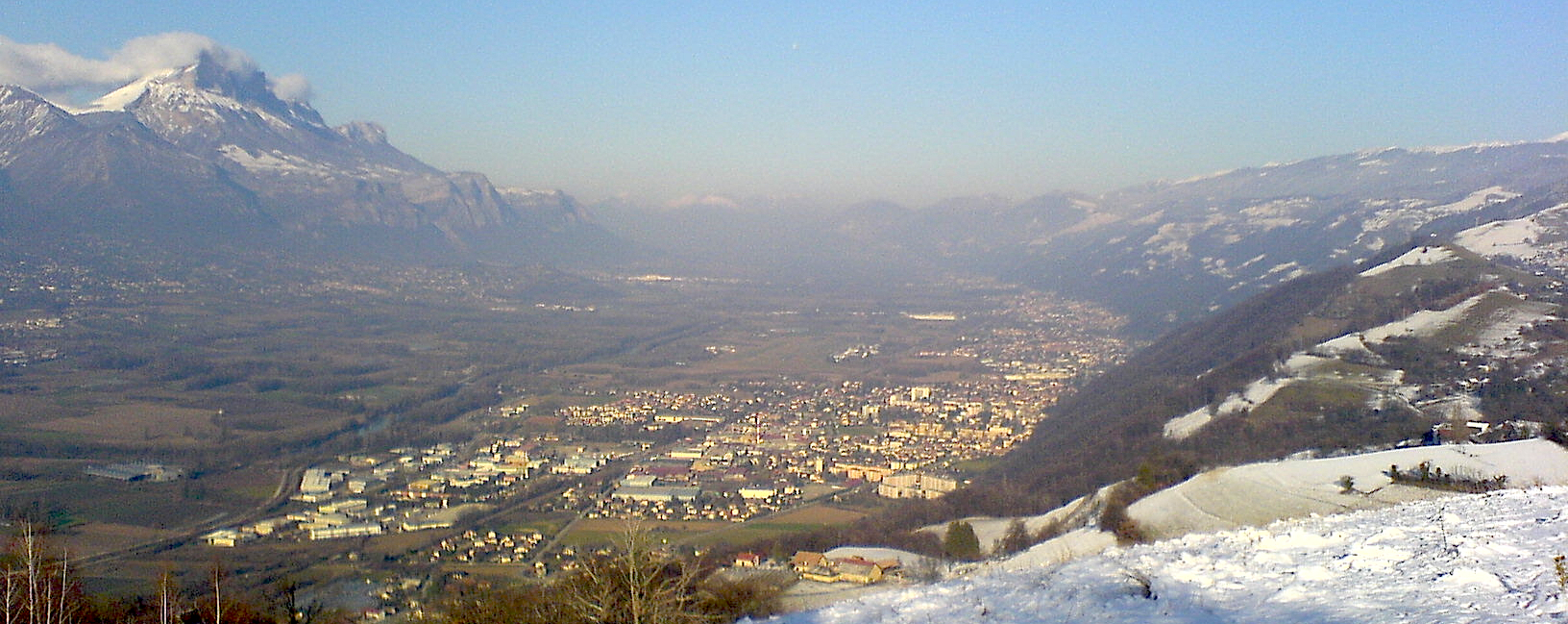
The Vallée du Grésivaudan in the Isère department where Peloursin is believed to have originated

Ampelographers believe that Peloursin originated in the Isère department near Grenoble somewhere along the Vallée du Grésivaudan. The name Peloursin likely derives from the local word pelossier used to describe the blackthorn trees that populate the area and whose fruit the Peloursin grapes have a slight resemblance to. At some point the grape was brought to the northern Franche-Comté and Savoie wine regions but it is in the Isère that the vine crossed with Syrah to produce the Durif vine.

=== Durif ===
In the 1860s, French botanist François Durif kept a nursery of several grape varieties at his home in the commune of Tullins where he most likely had plantings of both Peloursin and Syrah. At some point the two vines cross pollinated and Durif discovered a new grape variety growing in his nursery. It was identified and named Plant du Rif (later Durif) by ampelographer Victor Pulliat in 1868. Durif later made its way to California where it was eventually named Petite Sirah. In the late 20th century University of California, Davis researchers led by Dr. Carole Meredith discovered that some of the California plantings of Petite Sirah were, in fact Peloursin, and that Peloursin had a parent-offspring relationship with Durif that likely sprung from a crossing with Syrah.

== Viticulture ==
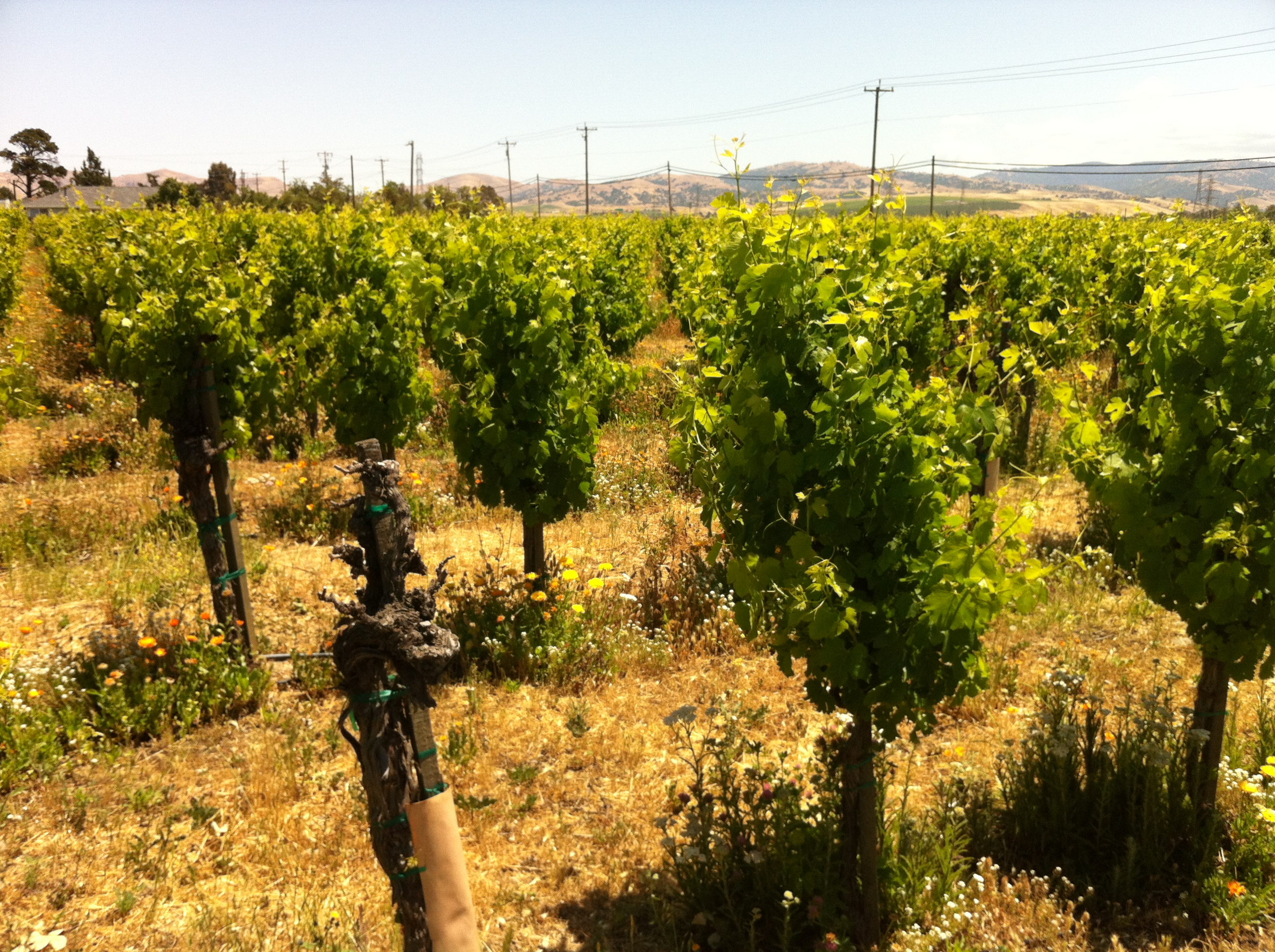
A vineyard of Durif/Petite Sirah in California. Recent DNA testing has shown that some California vineyards of Durif are actually field blends with Peloursin vines interspersed.

Peloursin is a vigorous grapevine capable of producing high yields and excessive foliage if not kept in check with winter pruning and summertime leaf pulling. The variety tends to be a mid-ripening grape whose main viticultural hazards are susceptibility to botrytis bunch rot and black rot.

== Wine regions ==
Today Peloursin is nearly extinct in France though some attempts have been made in recent years to revive the variety. In the Tarn department of South West France plantings of the grapes have been added to an experimental vineyard in Peyrole. Jura wine producer Domaine Ganevat has plantings of Peloursin (called here Gros Béclan) in their Rotalier vineyard which they use in their vin de primeur blend.

Outside France some plantings of Peloursin can be found in Victoria, Australia. In the late 20th century, several California vineyards that thought they were planted with Durif/Petite Sirah were found to be field blends that contain some plantings of Peloursin.

== Relationships and confusion with other grapes ==
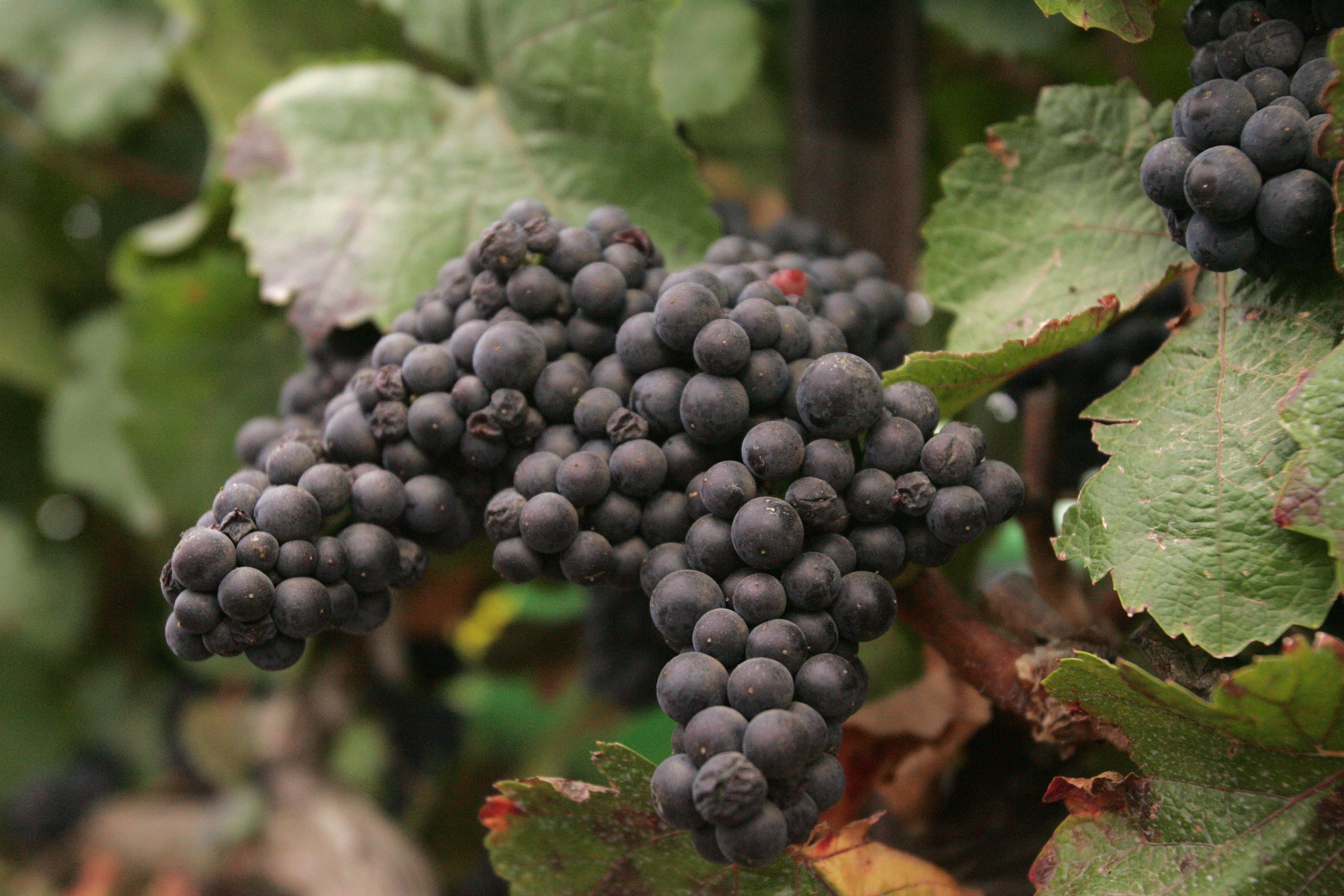
Peloursin crossed with Syrah (pictured) to produce Durif/Petite Sirah.

In addition to being a parent of Durif, Peloursin was also crossed with Persan to create Joubertin. DNA testing also suggest a relationship between Peloursin and Bia blanc which share some morphological similarities but the exact nature of that relationship is not yet known.

Plantings of Peloursin are often confused with its offspring Durif and this was particularly the case in California where many plantings of Petite Sirah/Durif were discovered to actually be Peloursin. In the Jura region, it is sometimes confused with both Poulsard and Béclan due to similarities in synonyms among the three grapes. In the Isère, Peloursin is sometimes confused with Dureza, one of the parent grapes of Syrah.

== Synonyms ==
Over the years Peloursin has been known under a variety of synonyms including: Belossard, Blauer Thuner, Chatille, Corsin (in Savoie), Durazaine, Duret, Durif fourchu, Famette, Feunette (in Haute-Savoie), Fumette (in Haute-Savoie), Gondran, Gro Nuar, Gronnat, Gronnay, Gros beclan (in Jura), Gros nat, Gros noir, Gros noirin, Gros plant, Mal noir, Mauvais noir, Mosaguin, Parlouseau, Parlousseau, Pelaursin, Pellorcin, Pellossard, Pelossard noir, Pellourcin, Pelorsin (in Isère), Pelossard, Pelossier, Peloursin noir, Plant d’Abas, Plant de Paris, Pourret (in Franche-Comté), Pourrot (in Franche-Comté), Saler, Salet, Salis, Sella, Soler, Spartin, Thuner, Thuner Rebe, Treillin, Verne and Vert noir.
