= Mondeuse blanche =

Variety of grape

- Grape (Vitis)
- Color of berry skin: Blanc
- Species: Vitis vinifera
- Also called: see list of synonyms
- Origin: France
- Notable regions: Savoy
- VIVC number: 7919

Mondeuse blanche (French pronunciation: [mɔ̃døz blɑ̃ʃ]) is a variety of white grape almost exclusively found in and around the Savoy (Savoie) wine region in France. With just 5 hectares (12 acres) of plantations in 1999, it leads a dwindling existence and is used primarily in the VDQS wine Bugey and the AOC Vin de Savoie.

== Related grapes ==
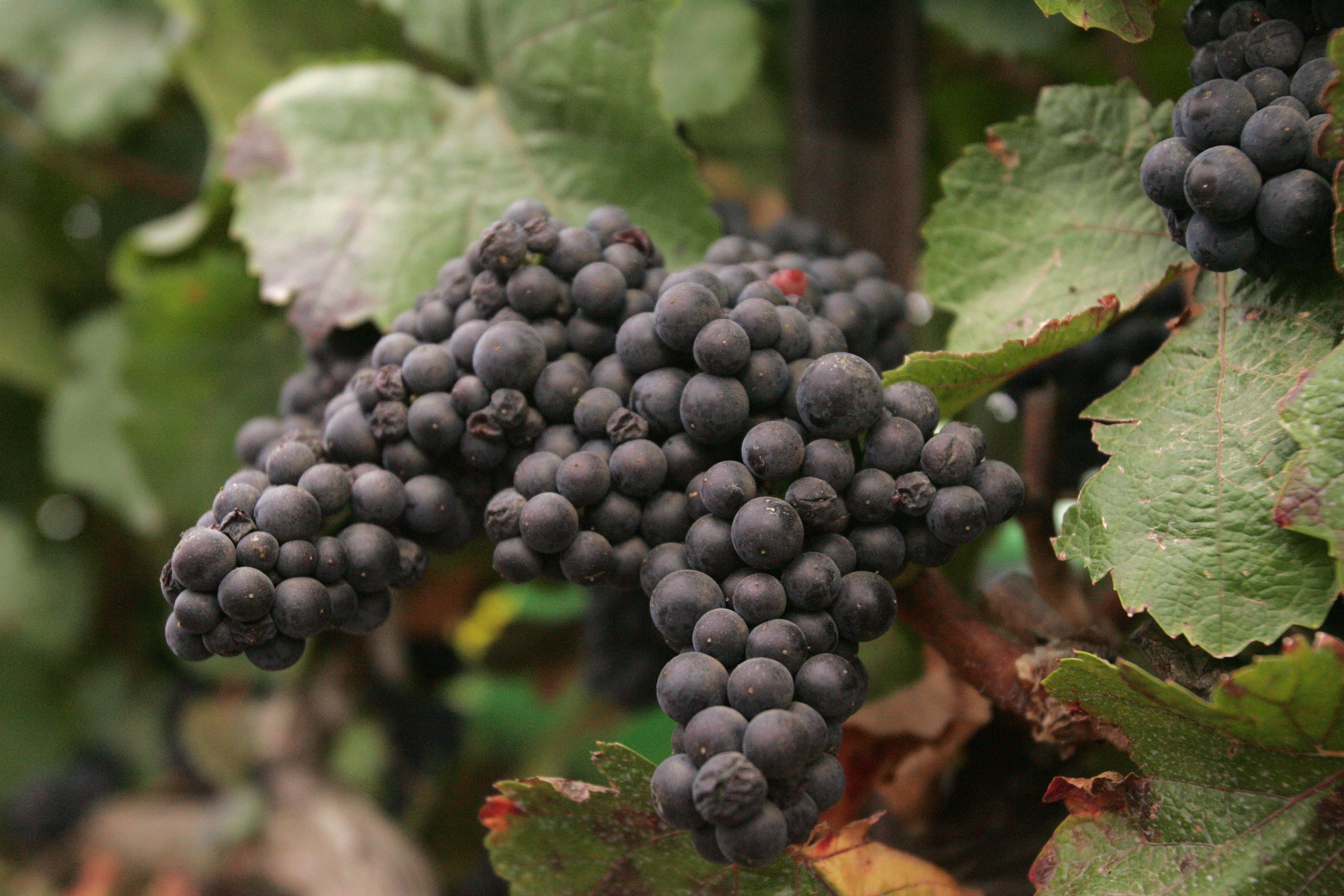
Some studies suggest that Mondeuse blanche to be a parent of Syrah (pictured is Syrah).

Some studies have suggested that Mondeuse blanche is a parent of Syrah. However, more recent, long-read sequencing of the Syrah/Shiraz genome suggests that this relationship may be more complex than parent-offspring (Onetto et al. 2022).

Despite their similarity in names, Mondeuse blanche is not closely related to Mondeuse noire, or Mondeuse gris.

Grapes just called Mondeuse are usually Mondeuse noire rather than Mondeuse blanche.

In the 20th century, ampelographers Louis Levadoux and (decades later) Linda Bisson categorized Mondeuse blanche as a member of the Peloursin eco-geogroup along with Bia blanc, Béclan, Dureza, Exbrayat, Durif, Jacquère, Joubertin, Peloursin, Servanin and Verdesse.

== Synonyms ==
Synonyms include Aigre blanc, Blanc Aigre, Blanche, Blanchette, Couilleri, Dongine, Donjin, Jongin, Jonvin, Molette, Persagne, Savouette.
