= Linda Bisson =

Trained yeast geneticist

Linda Frances Bisson
- Education: University of California, Berkeley
- Scientific career
- Workplaces: University of California, Davis
- Thesis: Studies on thymidylate metabolism in Saccharomyces cerevisiae (1980)

Linda Bisson is a trained yeast geneticist who focuses on sugar catabolism and fermentation. She is a retired professor and geneticist from the University of California, Davis.

== Education and career ==
Bisson has an undergraduate degree from San Francisco State University and, in 1975, Bisson her masters' degree from there while working on the bacteria Pseudomonas. She then earned a Ph.D. in 1980 from the University of California, Berkeley where she worked on metabolism of the yeast Saccharomyces cerevisiae. Following her Ph.D, she was a postdoc at Harvard Medical School before joining the faculty at University of California, Davis as an assistant professor in 1985. She was the Viticulture and Enology Chair from 1990 to 1995 and then the Maynard A. Amerine Endowed Chair in Viticulture and Enology from 1997 to 2008.

She was the science editor of the American Journal of Enology and Viticulture (AJEV) for 15 years and the co-author of the text book, “Principles and Practices of Winemaking.” The textbook won the Le Prix en Oenologie from the Office International de la Vigne et du Vin in 1998.

== Awards ==
In 2002, she received the Excellence in Teaching Award from UC Davis Extension; in 2004, she received the Excellence in Education Award from Associated Students of UCD; and in 2012, she was awarded the DEVO Excellence in Teaching Award. In 2011, she received the James M. Craig Lectureship Award from Oregon State University. In 2014, she was honored with the American Society for Enology and Viticulture's (ASEV) highest honor, the Merit Award, and was the ASEV Honorary Research Lecturer in 2000. She also received the University of California, Davis Charles P. Nash Prize.

== Selected publications ==
- Bisson, Linda F.; Waterhouse, Andrew L.; Ebeler, Susan E.; Walker, M. Andrew; Lapsley, James T. (August 2002). "The present and future of the international wine industry". Nature. 418 (6898): 696–699. Bibcode:2002Natur.418..696B. doi:10.1038/nature01018. PMID 12167877. S2CID 4383878.
- Bisson, L. F.; Fraenkel, D. G. (1 March 1983). "Involvement of kinases in glucose and fructose uptake by Saccharomyces cerevisiae". Proceedings of the National Academy of Sciences. 80 (6): 1730–1734. Bibcode:1983PNAS...80.1730B. doi:10.1073/pnas.80.6.1730. ISSN 0027-8424. PMC 393677. PMID 6300872.
- Bisson, Linda F. (1 January 1999). "Stuck and Sluggish Fermentations". American Journal of Enology and Viticulture. 50 (1): 107–119. doi:10.5344/ajev.1999.50.1.107. ISSN 0002-9254. S2CID 87840387.
- Boulton, Roger B.; Singleton, Vernon L.; Bisson, Linda F.; Kunkee, Ralph E. (1999). Principles and Practices of Winemaking. New York. ISBN 978-0834212701.
