= Arbor Mist =

Brand of alcoholic beverage

Arbor Mist is the brand name of an alcoholic beverage which blends wines such as Merlot, Zinfandel and Chardonnay with fruit flavourings and high fructose corn syrup. Its slogan is "Great Tasting Wine with a Splash of Fruit." Arbor Mist has a lower alcohol content than most wines, and is usually cheaper than other similar alcoholic beverages. It is made by the Arbor Mist Winery in Canandaigua, New York, and is packaged by E&J Gallo Winery.

== Varieties ==
Arbor Mist first appeared on store shelves in the United States in the summer of 1998, and was the best-selling wine debut since the 1970s. Originally appearing in just two different fruit varieties, Arbor Mist now makes fourteen standard varieties of their wine product:

- Blackberry Merlot
- Cherry Red Moscato
- Cranberry Twist White Merlot
- Exotic Fruits White Zinfandel
- Island Fruits Pinot Grigio
- Mango Strawberry Moscato
- Peach Chardonnay
- Peach Moscato
- Pineapple Strawberry Pink Moscato
- Pomegranate Berry Pinot Noir
- Raspberry Pink Moscato
- Sangria Zinfandel
- Strawberry White Zinfandel
- Tropical Fruit Chardonnay
- White Pear Pinot Grigio

Arbor Mist also makes a seasonal, winter flavor:

- Winter Berry Merlot (also sold under a number of different names, such as Merry Berry Merlot)

Discontinued flavours include:

- Melon White Zinfandel
- Mixed Berry Pinot Noir
- Orchard Fruits Chardonnay

In 2009 Arbor Mist launched two new champagne-like products:

- Peach Sparkle
- Raspberry Sparkle

In addition, Arbor Mist has started producing margaritas:

- Pineapple Coconut Margarita
- Strawberry Margarita

Arbor Mist also manufactures "wine blenders" as well.
