= Oeil de perdrix =

Type of blush wine produced in Switzerland

Oeil de Perdrix (French: [œj də pɛʁdʁi]) is a rosé wine produced in Switzerland. The history of the wine style dates back to the Middle Ages in the Champagne region of France and from there spread to the Canton of Neuchâtel in Switzerland where it would become a popular dry rosé made from pinot noir.

The name œil de perdrix means "partridge's eye" in French, a reference to the pale pink colour of the eye of a partridge in death throes. The Italian equivalent, Occhio di Pernice, is used for a pink wine style in Tuscany.

Until about a century ago, it was common for vineyards to have the red and white grapes unseparated, unlike today where each vineyard has a unique grape. This gave white wine, red wine, and what was called grey wine because the wine was neither white nor red. It is also an old name for very pale rosé wine made not by the saignée method, but by "pressurage direct", in which the juice of red grapes is drawn off and fermented with very little contact with the skins. With the modernization of viticulture and separation of grapes, the term Oeil de Perdrix disappeared in France, but remained in the Canton of Neuchâtel in Switzerland. The Canton of Neuchâtel would export Oeil de Perdrix primarily to the German-speaking cantons of Switzerland, but also to other cantons, namely to the cantons of Geneva, Vaud, and Valais. After the Second World War, the latter decided to start producing their own Oeil de Perdrix. When the policy for wine of controlled origin (AOC) in Switzerland began, the Canton of Neuchâtel claimed the sole Oeil de Perdrix AOC, but it was refused; the cantons of Geneva, Vaud, Valais, and Neuchâtel all have the Oeil de Perdrix AOC today.

The early origins of the American wine White Zinfandel can be traced to a California winemaker's attempt at making an Oeil de Perdrix–style wine.

== History ==
The Oeil de Perdrix style of wine is believed to have originated in the Middle Ages in Champagne region of France, prior to that region's development of the sparkling wine style that would take its name. During this period the Champenois were in competition with the Burgundy wine region for the favor of the Royal court and the lucrative Paris market. Red wine was particularly popular during this period and the northern location of the Champagne region had difficulties competing with the more fuller bodied wines of Burgundy. Winemakers in Aÿ, Marne began experimenting with creating a fuller bodied white wine from red wine grapes that the Champenois could uniquely market. Despite their best efforts, the Champenois did not have the technical expertise to make a truly "white" wine from red grapes, instead producing slightly pale colored wines which became known as "œil de Perdrix" or the "eye of the partridge". Centuries later, a Benedictine monk named Dom Pérignon would eventually perfect the method of producing white wine from red grapes that would be a vital component in the success of sparkling Champagne wine.

== Wine styles ==
Oeil de Perdrix is a particular speciality of the area around Neuchâtel in Switzerland, where it is made from Pinot noir grapes. It has a continued presence in Swiss wine as a dry rose style made from the free run (i.e. crushed, but not heavily pressed) juices of Pinot noir. The wine is meant to be chilled and consumed young. Vin gris is a more general term to describe white wine made from the black Pinot noir grapes. Currently, Oeil de Perdrix is an AOC wine and can only be produced in the designated AOC region.

=== White Zinfandel ===
Perhaps the most successful Oeil de Perdrix wine was made from Zinfandel at Sutter Home Winery. In 1975, this wine experienced a stuck fermentation, and the pink, sweet style of White Zinfandel, that would go on to enjoy massive commercial success, was thus accidentally born. Bob Trinchero originally planned to name the new wine Oeil de Perdrix, but the Bureau of Alcohol, Tobacco, Firearms and Explosives (ATF) demanded that Trinchero translate the name, so he added "White Zinfandel" to the label.
