= Cratosia =

Cratosia may refer to:

- Cratosia (moth), a genus better known as Cissura
- Cratosia, 15th-century name of Kratošija, a wine grape better known as Zinfandel
