= Pressing (wine) =

Process of extracting juice from grapes in winemaking

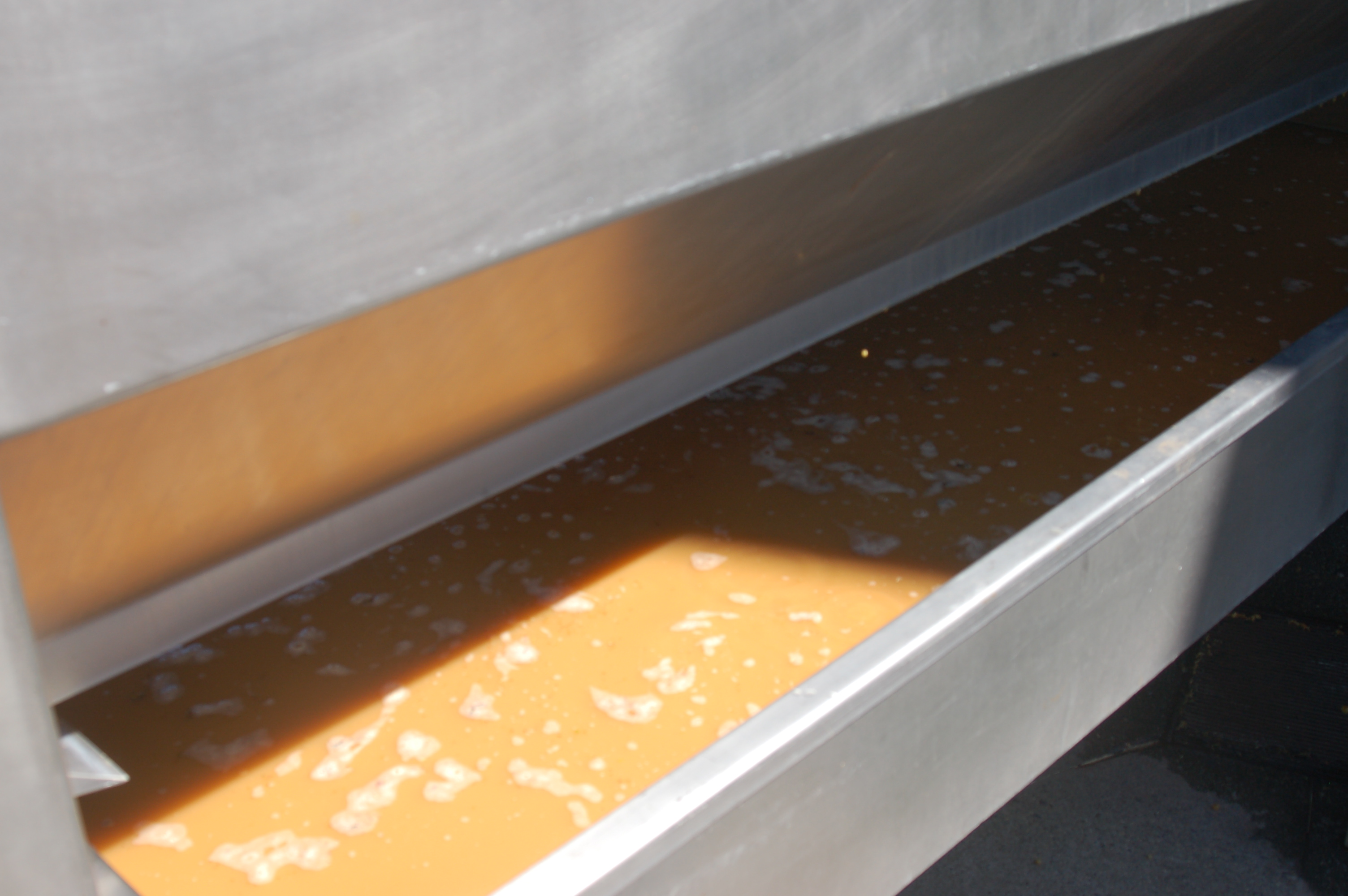
Viognier juice in the press pan after being pressed

In winemaking, pressing is the process where juice is extracted from the grapes with the aid of a wine-press, by hand, or even by the weight of the grape berries and clusters. Historically, intact grape clusters were trodden by feet but in most wineries today the grapes are sent through a crusher/destemmer, which removes the individual grape berries from the stems and breaks the skins, releasing some juice, prior to being pressed. There are exceptions, such as the case of sparkling wine production in regions such as Champagne where grapes are traditionally whole-cluster pressed with stems included to produce a lighter must that is low in phenolics.

In white wine production, pressing usually takes place immediately after crushing and before primary fermentation. In red wine production, the grapes are also crushed but pressing usually doesn't take place until after or near the end of fermentation with the time of skin contact between the juice and grapes leaching color, tannins and other phenolics from the skin. Approximately 60-70% of the available juice within the grape berry, the free-run juice, can be released by the crushing process and doesn't require the use of the press. The remaining 30-40% that comes from pressing can have higher pH levels, lower titratable acidity, potentially higher volatile acidity and higher phenolics than the free-run juice depending on the amount of pressure and tearing of the skins and will produce more astringent, bitter wine.

Winemakers often keep their free-run juice and pressed wine separate (and perhaps even further isolate the wine produced by different pressure levels/stages of pressing) during much of the winemaking process to either bottle separately or later blend portions of each to make a more complete, balanced wine. In practice the volume of many wines are made from 85 to 90% of free-run juice and 10-15% pressed juice.

== When to press and other winemaking decisions ==
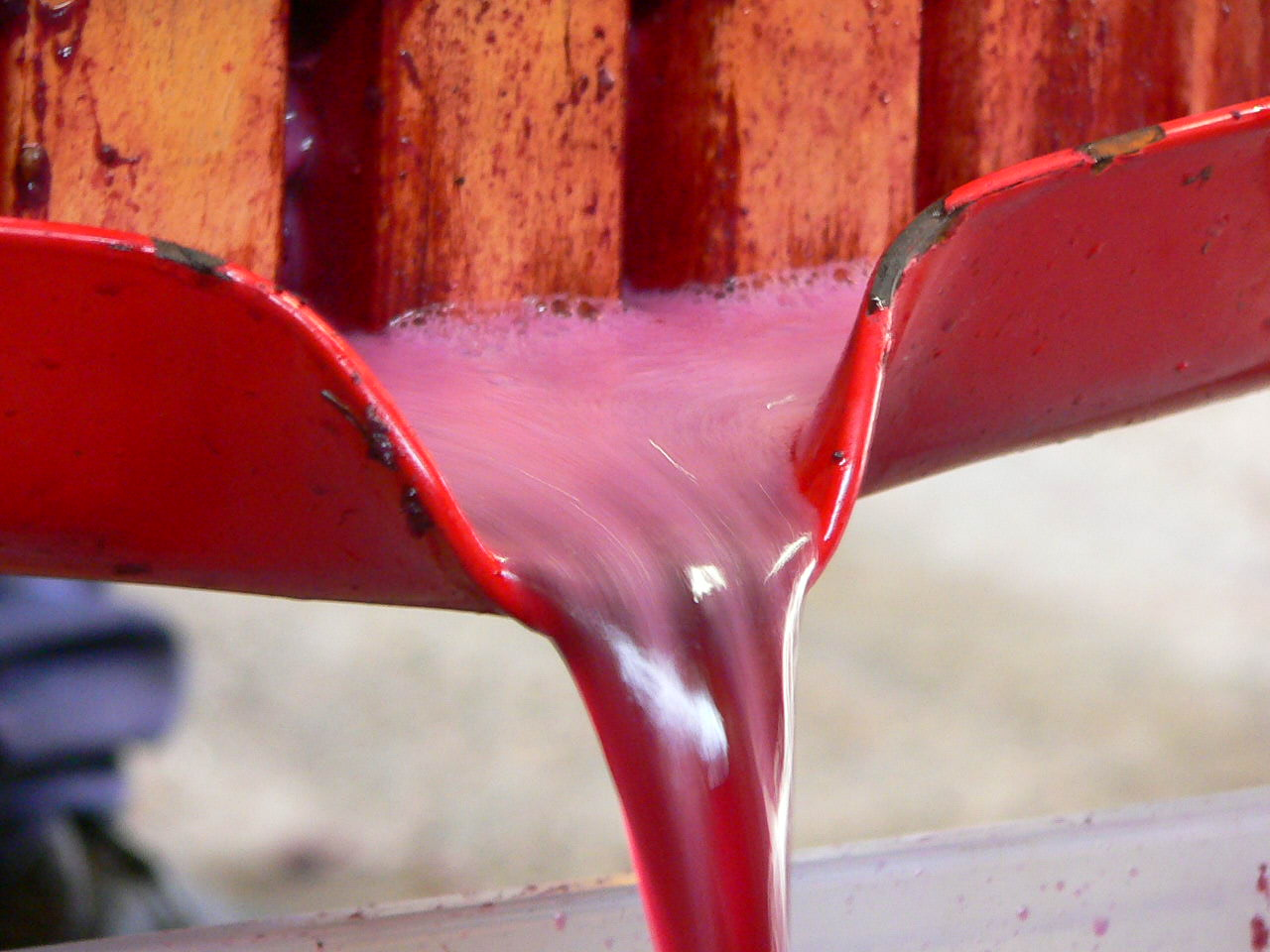
The decision on when to press red wine grapes will have an influence on color since color phenolics and tannins are extracted from the grapes during maceration prior to pressing.

The timing of pressing and the methods used will influence other decisions in the winemaking process. In white wine making, pressing usually happens immediately after harvest and crushing. Here, the biggest decision will be how much pressure to apply and how much pressed juice the winemakers wants in addition to the free-run juice. Some grape varieties, such as Sémillon and Aurore have very "liquidy" pulps that releases juice easily without needing much pressure that could risk tearing the skins. Other varieties, such as Catawba, have much tougher pulps that will require more pressing.

In red wine production the timing of when to press is one of the most important decisions in the wine making process since that will be the moment that maceration and phenolic extraction ceases. Some winemakers use the decreasing sugar level (such as brix measurement) scale and press once the wine has reached complete dryness. Often winemakers will use taste to determine if the wine has extracted enough tannins to produce a balanced wine and may press before complete dryness (such as at 3-8 brix). Though removing the skins by pressing often removes some solids that the wine yeast need to complete fermentation and the benefits of pressing early is often balanced by the risk of potential stuck fermentation.

The quality of the vintage year and the overall ripeness of the harvested grapes may also play a role since in cool years when the grapes are often harvested under-ripe, the tannins in the grape are often very "green" and harsh. In these years winemakers might press early (such as at 15 brix), a process that the Australians call "short vatting". In warmer years, the tannins may be full ripe or "sweet" and the winemaker may decide to do a period of extended maceration and not press the grapes for as long as a month after fermentation has completed.

Usually the pressed juice will require some additional treatment, which can be done separately to the pressed juice alone or to the entire batch of wine if the pressed juice is blended with the free-run. These treatments may include acid adjustments to lower pH, extended settling periods for clarification and additional racking to remove the extra suspended solids and the use of fining agents to remove extra solids or excess tannins. Grape pulp contains a lot of pectins that create colloid coagulation with these solids that will make the wine difficult to stabilize. Some winemakers will use pectolytic enzymes during the maceration process to help break down the cell walls to allow the release of more juice freely. These enzymes are also used with white wines to assist in clarification. The type of pressing used and the amount of suspended solids plays a particular role in filtering decisions as a high amount of suspended solids (particularly natural gums) can clog and damage expensive filters.

== History ==
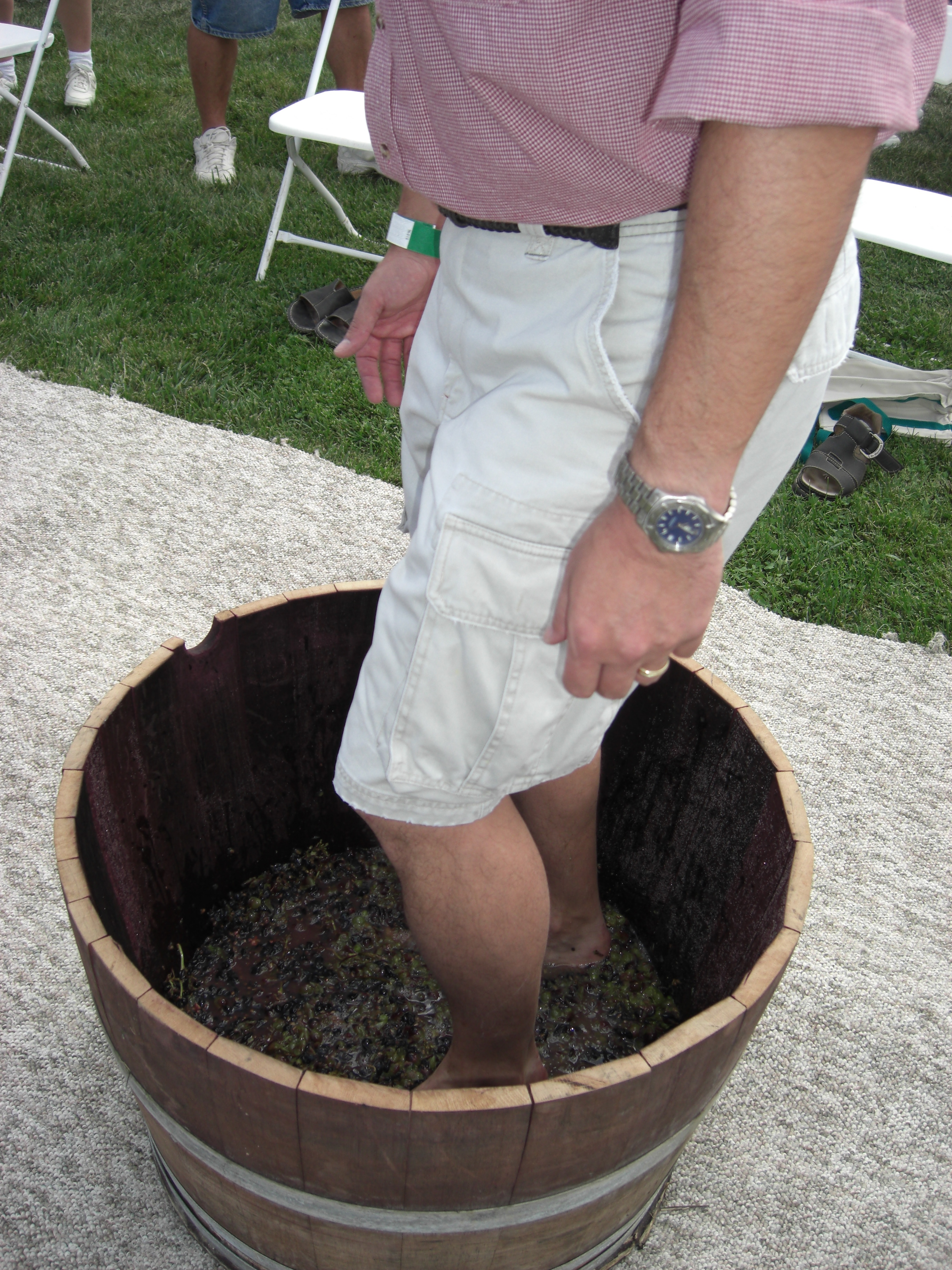
Grape stomping at the Colorado Mountain Winefest in Grand Junction, Colorado, United States

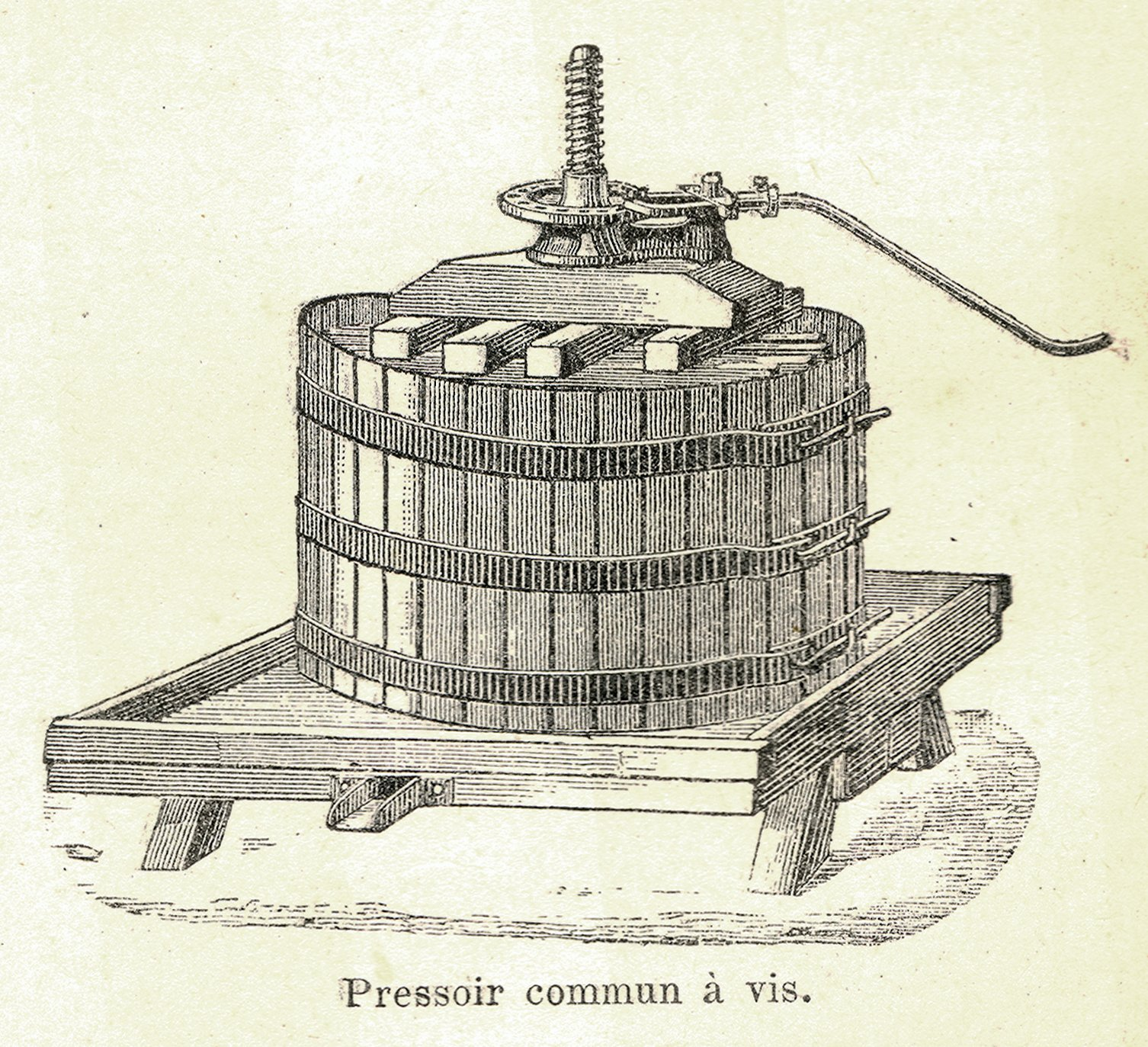
First developed in the Middle Ages, basket presses have a long history of use in winemaking.

The earliest wine press was likely the human foot or hand, crushing and squeezing grapes into a bag or container where the contents would ferment. The pressure applied by these manual means was limited and these early wines were likely pale in color and body. Eventually humans discovered that more juice could be extracted and potentially a better wine could be produced if they developed ways of pressing. It began with the ancient Egyptians who developed a "sack press" made of cloth that was squeezed with the aid of a giant tourniquet.

The ancient Greeks and Romans developed large wooden wine presses that utilized large beams, capstans and windlasses to exert pressure on the pomace. That style of wine press would eventually evolve into the basket press used in the Middle Ages by wine estates of the nobility and Catholic Church. There are many church records that showed feudal land tenants were willing to pay a portion of their crop to use a landlord's wine press if it was available. This was likely because added volume of wine (anywhere from 15 to 20%) that pressing could produce versus manual treading was substantial enough to justify the cost.

Machine pressing became even more widespread in the 17th and 18th century as the style of winemaking in France and other parts of Europe was shifting towards heartier wines that could age and survive long transport voyages overseas. Winemaking text began recommending the use of mechanical pressings over feet treading in lagars. Even in Bordeaux, which was still using lagars long after Burgundy, Champagne and other French wine regions had adopted the basket press, saw the use of a wine press become more popular after darker, more full bodied wines of Château Haut-Brion produced by Lord Arnaud III de Pontac began receive wide acclaim from English writers.

In the 20th century, wine presses advanced from the vertical style pressing of the basket press and ancient wine press to horizontal pressing with pressure either being applied at one or both ends or from the side through use of an airbag or bladder. These new presses were categorized as "batch", which like the basket press had to have the pomace emptied and grapes reloaded, and as "continuous" where a belt or Archimedes' screw would subject the grapes/pomace to increasing pressure from one end of the press to the other with new grapes being added and the pomace being continuously removed. Another advancement was the complete enclosure of the press (sometimes called "tank press") that reduced the exposure of the grape must to air. Some advance presses can even be flushed with nitrogen to create a complete anaerobic environment that can be desired for wine making with white wine grapes. Additionally, many of today's modern presses are computerized, which allows the operator to control exactly how much pressure is being applied to the grape skins and for how many cycles.

== Types of presses ==
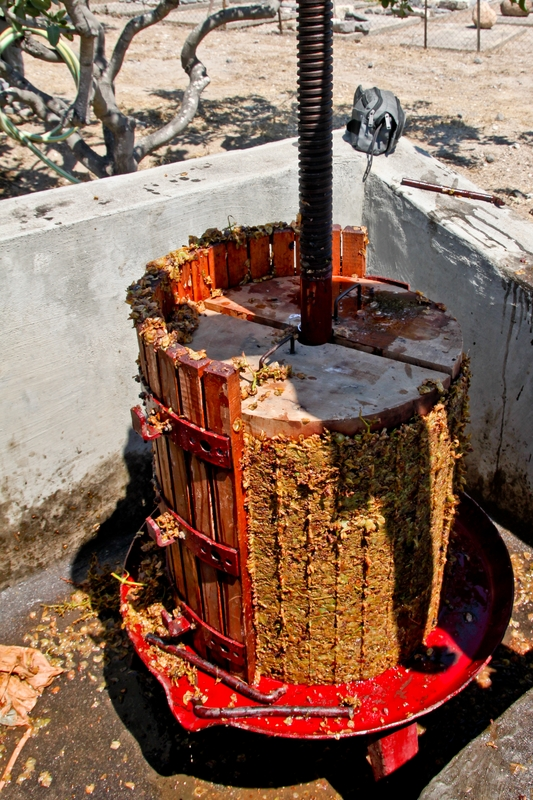
A basket press with half of its slats removed to show the compact pomace "cake" that develops from the leftover skins, seeds and stems after pressing. This cake needs to be cleaned out and removed after each batch.

Wine presses are generally classified into two types—batch and continuous. Batch presses involve pressing a set amount (a "batch") of grapes with the press needing to be emptied of the pomace or "cake" (the leftover skins, seeds and stems) between batches. There are many different styles of batch presses ranging from simple hand-operated basket presses to computerized membrane presses and presses that are "opened" with oxygen able to come into contact with the must or "enclosed" in a tank that allows for anaerobic winemaking. Continuous presses use a helical screw (such as an auger) or belt that transports the grapes from a feed in across a cylindrical screen or between air pressured filled pads that presses the grapes, compacts the cakes and then removes the cake through an output all in one continuous operation.

In general, batch presses are considered more "gentle" with less movement of the grape skins that minimize the amount of tearing of the skins. The more the grape skins are torn or scoured, the more phenolic compounds and tannins that are extracted, which can increase the harshness of the wine. However, batch presses are much more labor-intensive, requiring repeated emptying and filling and can also be more time-consuming, often requiring between 1 and 2 hours per press cycle. Continuous presses, which are often used by high-volume wine producers, can be more efficient, with some continuous screw presses having the capability of doing upwards of 100 metric tonnes per hour.

The development of large, enclosed membrane presses in the 1970s that could more efficiently process larger batches of grapes with acceptable quality of juice encouraged many wineries to transition away from using screw presses. While basket presses are still popular among artisan and small wineries and some high volume producers still utilize continuous screw, the most commonly used presses in the wine industry tend to be membrane presses.

=== Batch presses ===
Batch presses typically operate in a cycle that can be mechanized or manual. This involves the following steps:

1. Filling the tank or basket with grapes
2. Applying pressure
3. Rotating the tank or manually breaking up the cake
4. Applying pressure again at higher levels
5. Repeat of rotation or cake break up if applying further pressure
6. Depressurizing and emptying

The benefit or rotating the tank or breaking up the cake is to promote a more even pressing and formation of a regular-shape cake that will be easier to move. From the moment that grapes are filled into the tank or basket, juice is being released and extracted. This juice is usually drained by the tank into a waiting container or "press pan" that is then transferred or pumped into another container.

The amount of pressure applied (and speed) will depend on the winemaker's preference with additional pressure increasing the likelihood that the skins and seeds of the grapes will be scoured and torn, releasing tannins and other phenolic compounds that could make the juice more astringent and bitter. Typically mechanized batch presses will begin at less than 1 bar (slightly less than 1 atm) of pressure and gradually increase to a maximum of 4 to 6 bars over a course of 1 to 2 hours. The slower that the pressure is applied and gradually increased, the more gentle the overall pressing will be.

There are several different types of batch presses, each with its own benefits and disadvantages. The ones most commonly found in wineries are listed below.

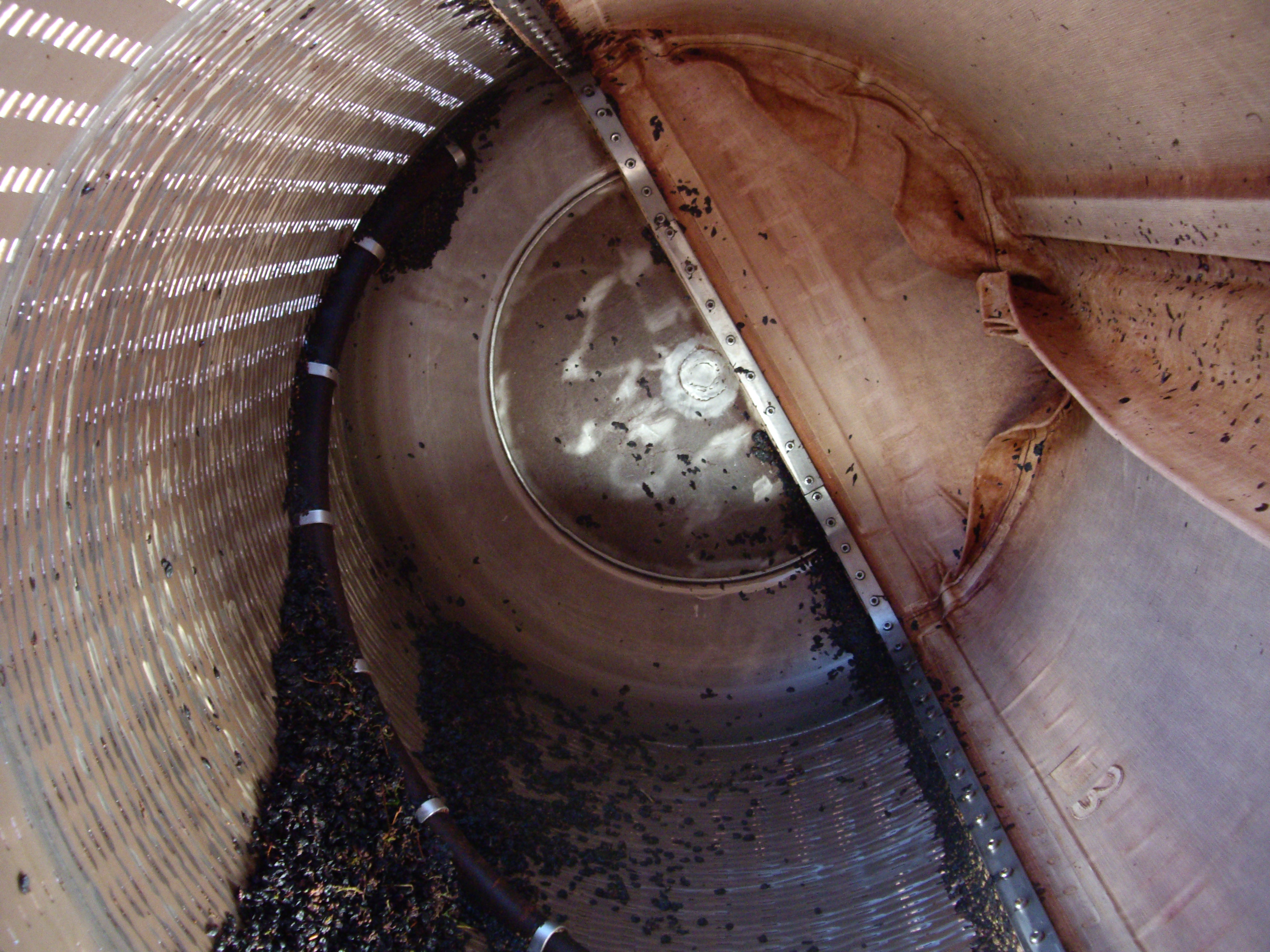
Inside of a membrane press with the deflated membrane mounted to the right side of the tank. Also pictured is left-over pomace (grape skins and seeds) from pressing.

Basket press
One of the earliest styles of mechanical press, these can range from a simple wooden basket with vertical slats and a capstan providing pressure to large hydraulic presses that can even be enclosed to prevent exposure to oxygen. An advantage of this style of press is the usually gentle means that it presses the grape but its disadvantages includes the labor intensiveness of its use, small volumes and tendency to provide uneven pressure to all parts of the cake as well as usually exposing the must to significant amounts of oxygen. Another disadvantage from a time perspective but an advantage in other regards such as gentleness, is that by its nature pressing with a basket press is very slow. Applying too much pressure too rapidly can break the press.
Moving head press
This press is essentially a basket press that has been turned on it sides with two heads at opposite ends providing more homogenous pressure as it moves horizontally towards the compacting cake. Often these presses have chains connected between the two heads that break up the cake between pressings as the heads are retracted. While less labor-intensive than traditional basket presses and providing more even pressure, one disadvantage of the moving head press is that it that cake gets so compact that it is often difficult for juice to strain from the inner core of the cake out. This has the effect of creating a dry "outer cake" and wet "inner cake" with trapped juices still inside. The juice extracted from the dry outer cake can also be very coarse and high in phenolics.
Bladder press
Also known as a "pneumatic press". To counter the disadvantages of the moving head press, the bladder press was designed to have a long cylindrical rubber sausage (the "bladder") mounted through the center of the tank (creating essentially an annulus) that is inflated by air or water to produce outward pressure on the cake against a perforated screen. The cake becomes like a donut with even pressure applied almost equally to all parts of the cake. The benefits of this style are a usually even amount of pressure applied to the cake as well as an added ability to help cool the must if the bladder is filled with cold water. A disadvantage is the labor intensiveness of cleaning and empty and the potential high oxygen exposure if the tank is not enclosed.
Membrane press
Instead of providing pressure from the center out like with a bladder press, the membrane of a membrane press is mounted on one side of the press horizontally between the two ends. On the opposite ends are drain screens that allow the release juice to drain through into the waiting press pan. Like a bladder press external pressure is applied by pressurized air (rarely water) that gradually inflates the membrane that gently presses the grapes against the drain screen. The advantage of this style of press is the gentle pressure and minimal movement of the grapes, which minimizes the amount of tearing and scouring of the skins and seeds. This limits the amount of suspended solids and extracted phenolics in the pressed wine. Also, many membrane presses are fully enclosed, allowing for anaerobic winemaking without any exposure to oxygen. In addition to the same labor and time disadvantages (some presses can take 2 to 4 hours a batch) of the other batch presses, these computerized and enclosed membrane press are often some of the more expensive pieces of equipment a winery can buy.

=== Continuous presses ===
Diagram of a wine grape showing the different components that can be released with pressing. The harshest phenolics come from the outer layer of the grape and skins as well as the seeds that can be scoured or torn by frequent movement.

The benefits of continuous presses is the "continuous" sequence that allows large volumes of grapes to be pressed with minimum labor involvement. Instead of pressing separate batches that need to be emptied and refilled, continuous press typically have an input area and some mechanism (such as an auger screw or belt) that transfers the grapes through the pressings with an output area for the discarded cake. The throughput is limited by the capacity of the tank and the diameter of the screw or width of the belts. Many models of continuous screw presses can process from 50 to upwards of a 100 metric tonnes an hour. This can be a significant advantage for a high volume winery compared to batch presses that often only process 1 to 5 tonnes an hour.

While not as varied as batch presses, there are three main types of continuous presses, each with their own benefits and disadvantages. While often more common in the juice industry than in winemaking (and are even banned for quality wine production in some wine regions such as Algeria), the following presses may be found in (usually high volume) wineries.

- Screw press- Grapes are loaded into an input where a large helical screw transfers the grape across perforated cylinder that allows the release juice to escape. As screw moves further down, the cake pomace is subjected to increasing pressure. While the advantage is the high throughput, the harsh pressing and movement cause tearing and grinding of the grape skins and seeds, causing more minerals (such as potassium, which can affect pH), tannins and natural gums to be extracted into the juice. As much as 4% v/v of the pressed juice from a screw press could be suspended solids that may need to be treated by clarification and fining agents to be stable and filterable.
- Impulse press- A modification of the screw press that aimed to limit the amount of movement of the grapes. The press first draws the screw back into the container as the grapes to be loaded in. Then the screw moves forward horizontally acting more like a "battering ram" than an auger by intermittently pushing the cake in "impulses" against the far end of the press. While producing slightly less phenolic press fraction, the disadvantage of this press is the decrease efficiency that is almost on par with batch presses.
- Belt press- This press utilizes a series of air-inflated pads along a wire mesh belt. Usually several meters long, fresh grapes are loaded onto the beginning of the belt where it is transferred by rollers through the series of pads that apply pressure, hold it for a time and release with the juice falling through the screens into waiting press pans. Belt presses have been used by high volume wineries for whole-cluster pressing and sparkling wine production but it has not caught on in many wine regions due to concerns about the amount of oxidation it introduces to the wine as well as the large amount of suspended solids that get past the screens.

==== Press sections ====
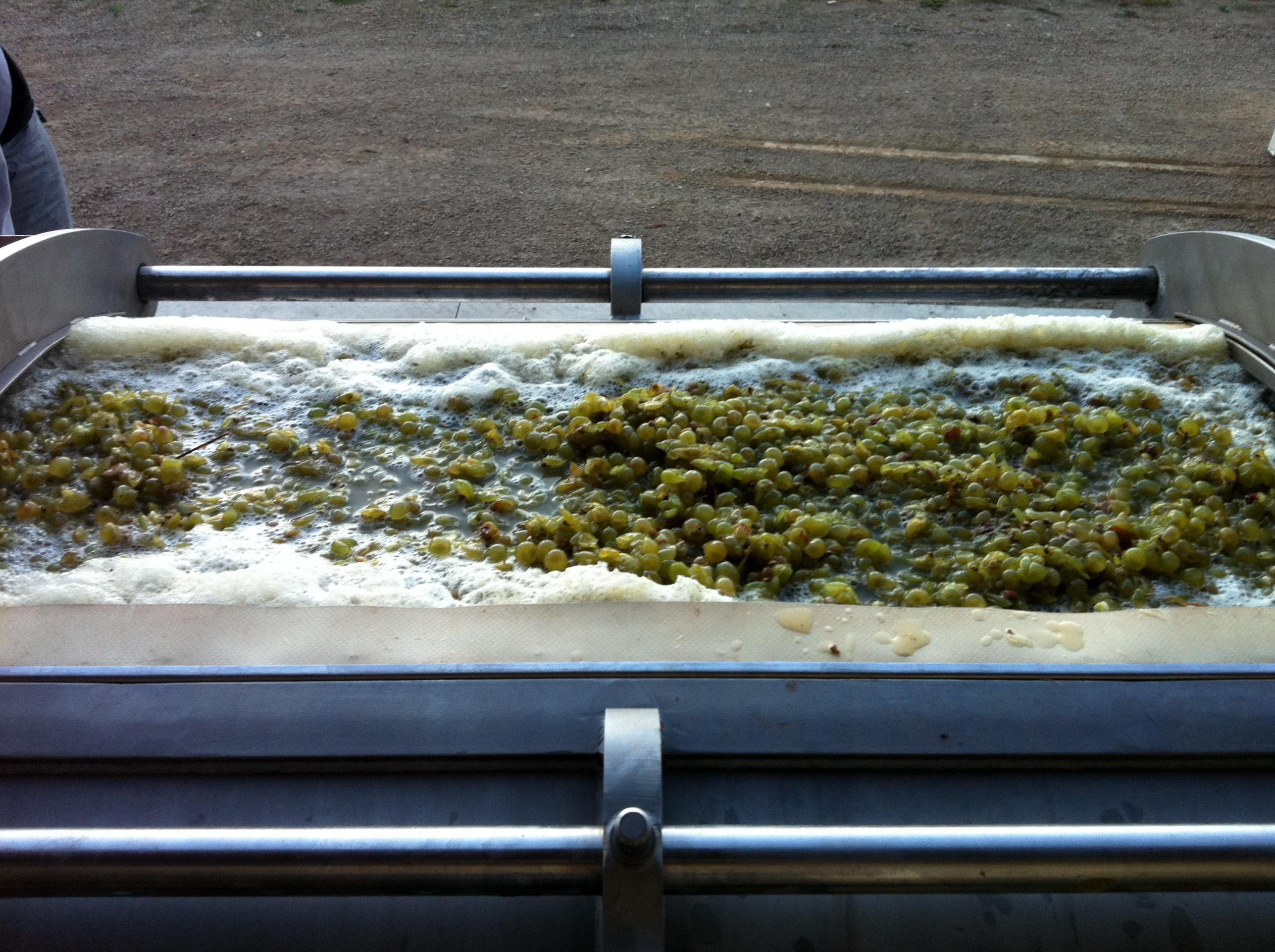
Fermenting Chardonnay grapes ready to be pressed

There is a trade off between the high volume and throughput that continuous presses can manage versus the overall quality of the press juice compared to the potentially more delicate means of some batch presses. However, there are noticeable difference in the composition of the pressed juice from continuous presses that are taken from the beginning of the press (the 1st press section) with the least amount of pressure and movement versus the fractions that come further down the path. Often winemakers will have separate press pans under each section that they will keep apart and vinify separately.

Below is a table of the difference in Riesling juice composition between free-run juice and the juice that comes out from the different sections of a continuous press from the relatively low pressure 1st press section to the more compact, higher pressure 3rd press section.

Component	Free-run	1st press section	2nd press section	3rd press section
Brix	17.2	17.5	17.5	17.5
pH	3.1	3.2	3.4	3.5
Titratable Acidity (g/L)	8.9	9.1	8.8	9.1
Phenolic content (mg/L)	306	607	1142	1988
Suspended solids (g/L)	46.2	16.8	27.9	23.7

== Free-run versus pressed juice ==
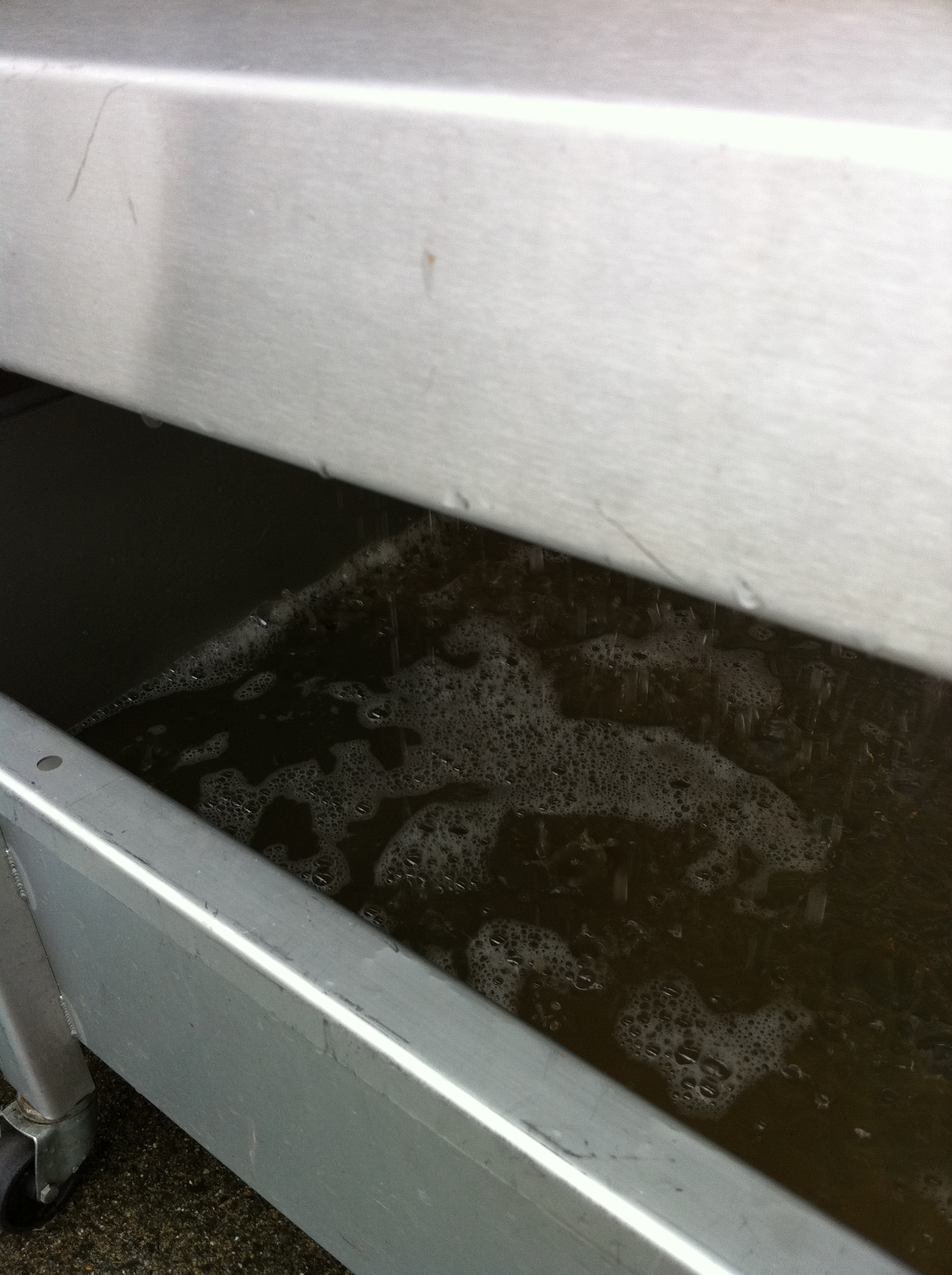
Free-run Madeline Angevine juice flowing into the press pan before the press is turned on. This juice usually has higher acidity, lower pH, less phenolics and less suspended solids than the pressed juice.

For as long as presses have been used, winemakers have been aware of the different color, body and aroma characteristics of wine made from the "free-run" juice compared to pressed juice. Free-run is the juice that has been extracted through the process of crushing, the natural break down of the grape cell walls during maceration and fermentation and by the own weight of the grape berries as they are loaded on top of each other in a press. Even among press juice there are compositional difference between the various "fractions" of juice produced from initial pressing through subsequent (and usually harsher) pressing. Often winemakers will keep free-run and pressed juice separated for most of the winemaking process including malolactic fermentation and barrel aging with the options to later blend between them to make the most complete, balanced wine, bottle separately under different labels and price tiers or to discard/sell off the pressed fractions to another producer.

The main difference between free-run and pressed juice is that pressed juice often has lower acidity levels, higher potassium and pH level, more phenolic compounds such as tannins and more suspended solids such as natural gum and proteins. Some of these attributes can be positive influences on the wine with the increased phenolics offering more body, aroma characteristics (such as the varietal aromas from terpenes) and aging potential. Other attributes may have more negative influence such as increased astringency and bitterness, precursor for browning pigments in white wine, mouthfeel and balance issues (as well as potential microbial instability) from the increased pH and the enhance need for fining agents to assist in the clarification and stabilization of the wine with the increase in suspended solids.

The extent of these differences will be magnified or minimized based on the initial condition of the fruit after harvest (with moldy, damaged, sun-burnt or botryized grapes producing stark differences between free-run and pressed juice), the type of press used, the amount of pressure involved and the overall amount of movement that the grapes are subject to that could impact how much the skins and seeds are scoured and torn.

=== Pressed fractions ===
Below is a table of the difference in Riesling juice composition between free-run juice and various press fractions using a membrane press.

Component	Free-run	1st Pressing	3rd Pressing	9th Pressing
Brix	17.7	17.9	17.9	17.7
pH	3.07	3.2	3.29	3.35
Titratable Acidity (g/L)	10.7	9.35	9.25	9.1
Phenolic content (mg/L)	357	486	439	440
Suspended solids (g/L)	39.1	19.1	15.4	9.2

== Whole-cluster pressing ==
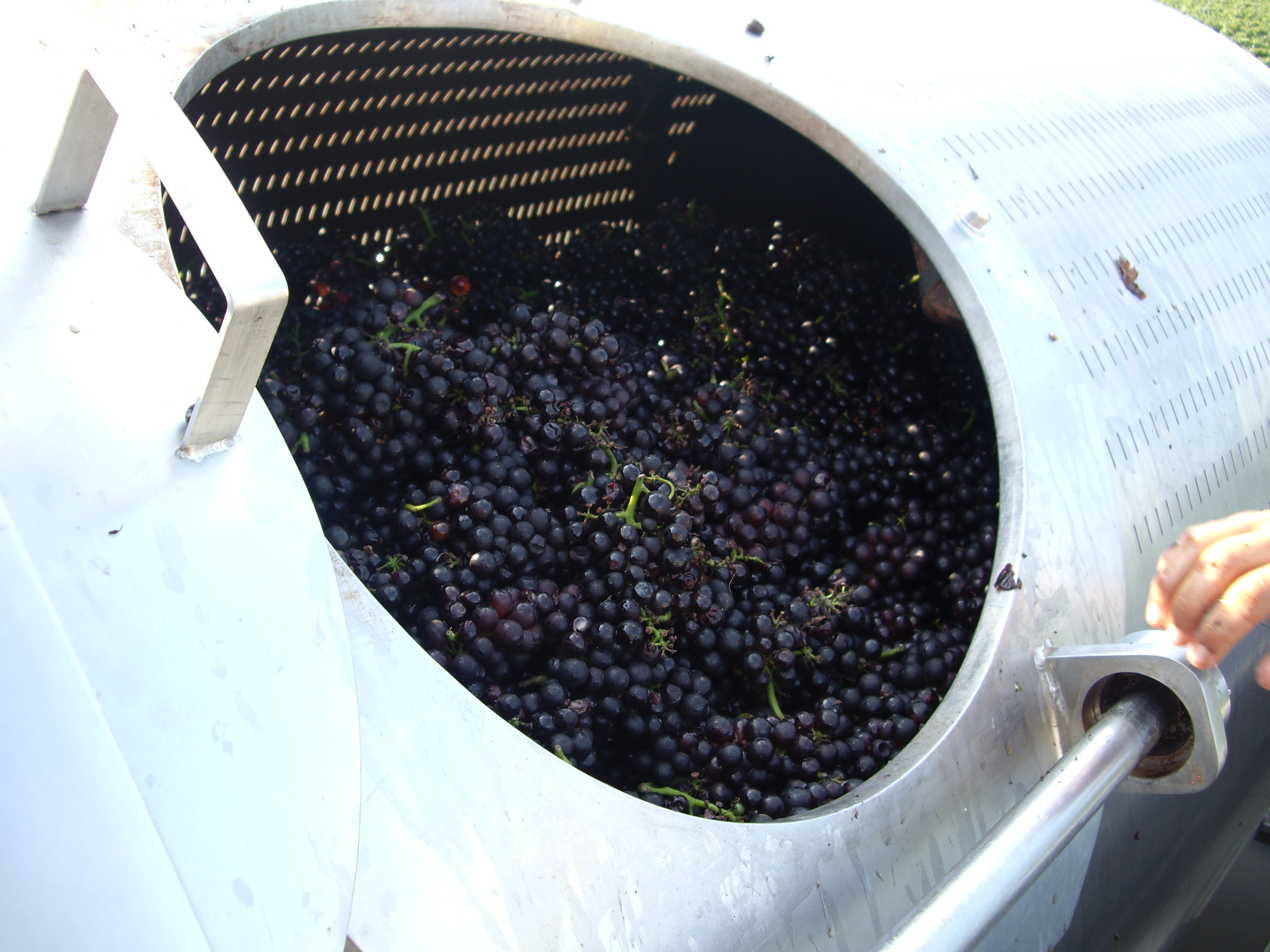
Whole clusters of Pinot noir about to be pressed

Whole-cluster pressing is where instead of first sending the grapes through a destemmer/crusher the intact grapes are directly pressed still attached to the stems. This is a method that is widely used for white, rosé and sparkling wine production because it usually produces a more delicate, less phenolic and less colored wine. Even some red wine producers (most notably Pinot noir) will use this type of pressing to avoid harsh tannins or "green-ness" that may come from under ripe grapes. This method is different from "stem pressing" where the grapes are crushed and destemmed but portions of the stems are saved and tossed into the wine press to add some phenolics as well as create "channels" for the juice to drain between the skins, which can limit how often the drain screens get clogged.

Under the whole-cluster method, the first press fraction is essentially the "free-run" fraction since the grapes berries are only first being broken and releasing juice as the press cycle begins. However, like with the pressing of crushed grapes the composition of the juice changes with each subsequent pressing and these fractions are often kept separate. Unlike crushed grape pressing, where usually the free-run juice is most prized, in whole-cluster pressing the second fraction is often most valued for its balance of phenolic content and aging potential.

In Champagne, where whole-cluster pressing in shallow basket press is very common, the tradition of separating the press fractions dates back to Dom Pérignon with guidelines recorded in 1718 by his biographer Canon Godinot. According to Pérignon (Godinot), the free run vin de goutte was considered too delicate and lacking on its own to make fine Champagne and it was sometimes discarded or used for other wines. The first and second pressings (called tailles or cut since the pomace cake was literally cut with ropes, chains or paddles to remove it between pressings) were the most ideal for sparkling wine production. The juice of the third pressing was considerable acceptable but the fourth pressing (called the vin de taille) was rarely used and all other pressings after that (the vins de pressoirs) were considered too harsh and colored to be of any value in Champagne production.
