= Sutter Home Winery =

American winery

Coordinates: 38.4913°N 122.4533°W

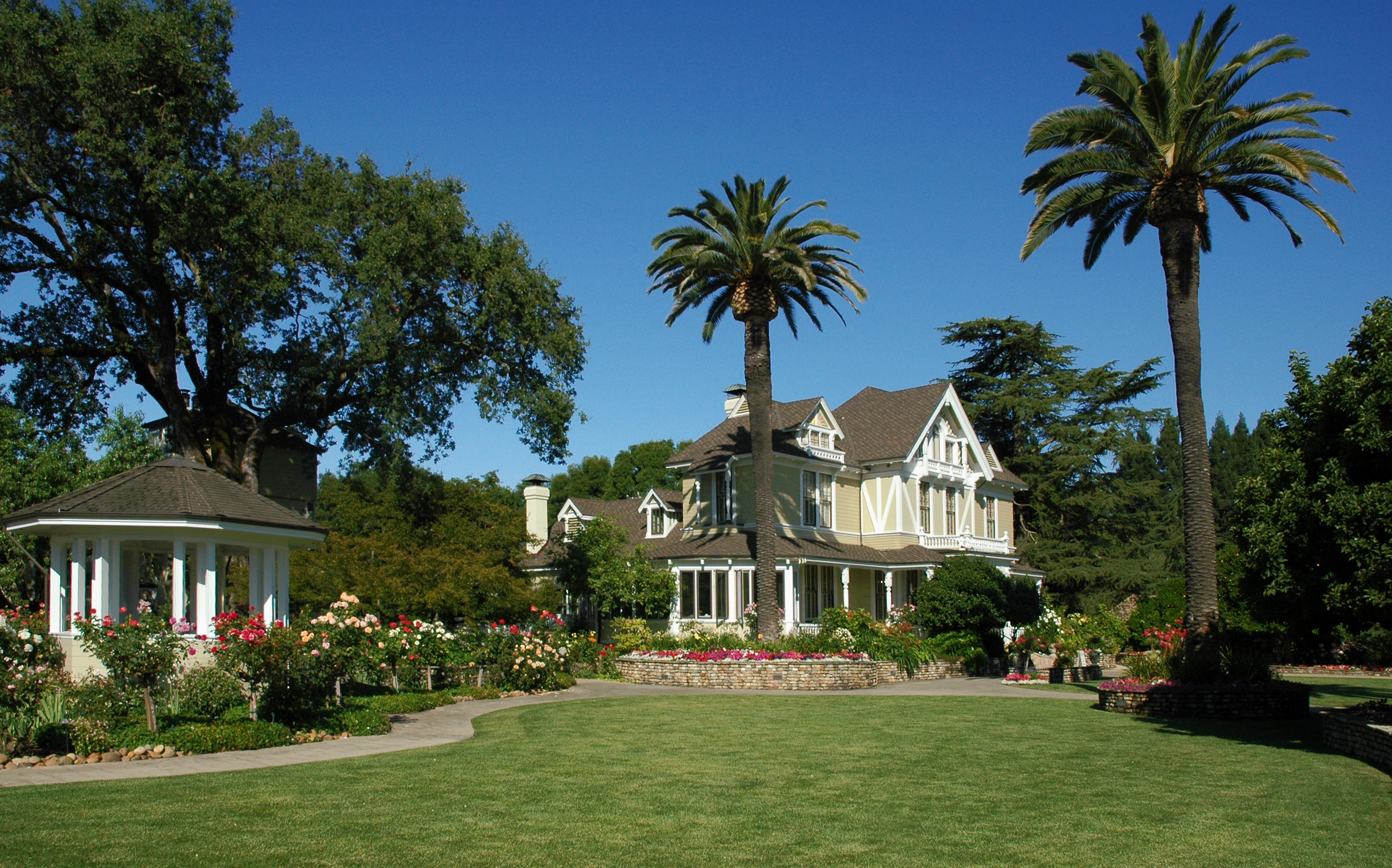
Sutter Home Winery in St. Helena, California

Sutter Home Winery is one of the largest family-run independent wineries in the United States, and is the estate known for the creation of White Zinfandel. It is located in St. Helena, California and owned by Trinchero Family Estates.

== History ==
In 1874 the Swiss-German immigrant John Thomann established a small winery and distillery in St. Helena in central Napa County, California. After his death, the winery and Victorian home beside it were sold to another Swiss family, the Leunbergers, who renamed the estate Sutter Home.

As with most Napa Valley wineries, Sutter Home was shut down during Prohibition. The winery remained abandoned until 1948, when it was purchased by John and Mario Trinchero, immigrant brothers from New York City whose family had been active in the Italian wine business. The Trincheros refurbished the winery and began producing Napa Valley wines, initially scraping by making generic jug wines. For years they operated “mom-and-pop” style, selling to their Napa Valley neighbors, who filled their barrels and bottles at the winery's back door.

In 1968 Louis “Bob” Trinchero (Mario's oldest son) began vinifying Amador County Zinfandel.

=== White Zinfandel ===
In 1972, another of Bob Trinchero's innovations provided the American wine consumer with a new style of premium wine known as White Zinfandel. Initially labeled as an Oeil de Perdrix, the Federal Bureau of Alcohol, Tobacco and Firearms demanded something in English on the label, and the name, "A White Zinfandel Wine" was added. By 1975 the name Oeil de Perdrix was removed. A fortunate accident occurred during the making of the 1975 vintage, as some 1,000 gallons of bleed-off juice from red Zinfandel refused to ferment to dryness, retaining a substantial amount of sugar, and Trinchero put the wine aside for the time. He said, "Two weeks later, I tasted that wine and it was sweet, had a pink color, and I thought, 'Darn, that's pretty good. We bottled it, and the rest is history."

By 1987, Sutter Home White Zinfandel had become the best-selling premium wine in the United States. In 1994, Wine Spectator gave Trinchero its Distinguished Service Award for "having introduced more Americans to wine on the table than anyone in history".

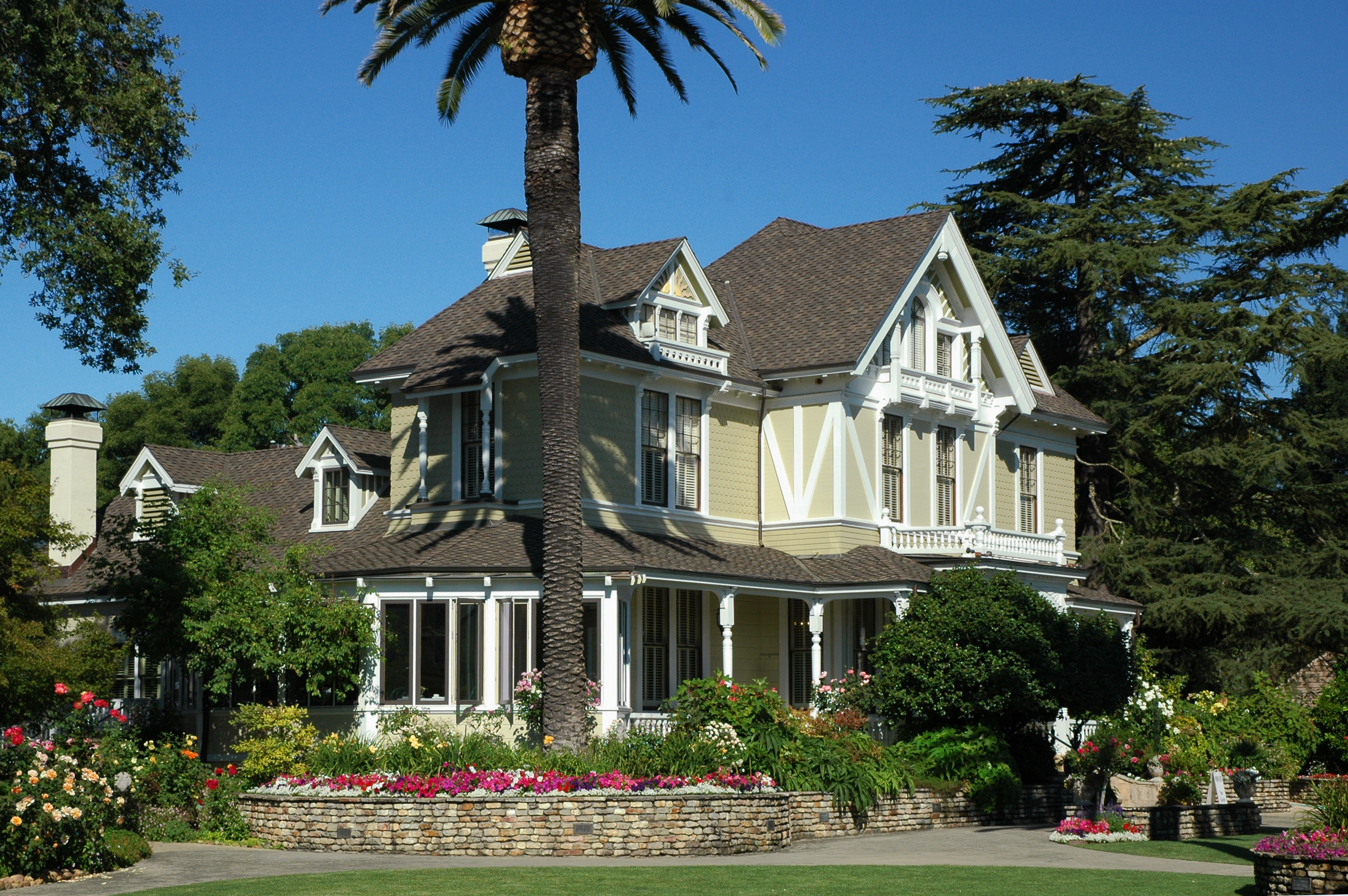
The Sutter Home Victorian house is featured on the wine bottle labels

=== Present ===
In collaboration with Bob Torkelson, the Trinchero family manages the large winemaking organization, overseeing operations from grapegrowing and production, marketing and sales. The Trincheros are noted for their industry leadership, commitment to sustainable agriculture and preserving the environment.

Today, Sutter Home is the second largest family-owned winery in the world and the fourth largest winery in the United States. All winemaking, bottling, shipping and warehousing operations are concentrated in three modern facilities in Napa County. The original winery site on Highway 29 houses the winery's Visitors Center.

== Production ==
Sutter Home's White Zinfandel production increased from 25,000 cases in 1981 to 1.3 million in 1986. In 2004, Trinchero Family Estates winery produced about 10 million cases a year, with Sutter Home White Zinfandel being 95% of those unit sales.

Sutter Home Winery produces 21 varietal wines including Chardonnay, Sauvignon blanc, White Zinfandel, White Merlot, Gewürztraminer, Chenin blanc, Moscato, Merlot, Cabernet Sauvignon, Zinfandel, Red Blend, Pinot noir, Pinot grigio, Sweet Red, Red Moscato, Moscato Sangria, Pink Moscato, Riesling Moscato, Sweet Riesling, Rosé, and Sangria, as of 2020.
