= White Zinfandel =

Rosé wine made from Zinfandel grapes

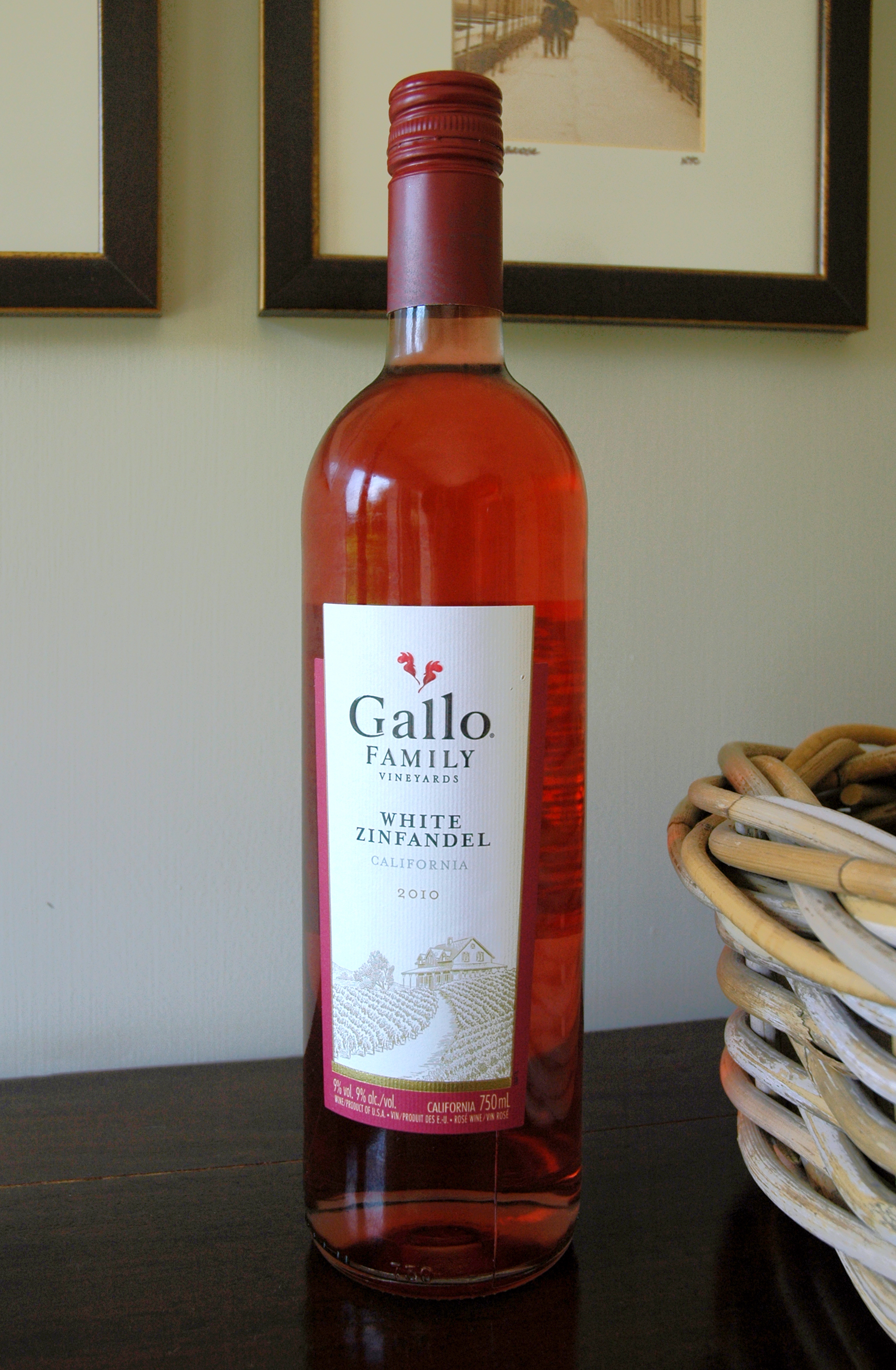
A bottle of California-made White Zinfandel

White Zinfandel is a type of rosé wine made from red Zinfandel grapes that falls between the categories of off-dry and sweet. As it is not made from white grapes, it has a blush color, derived from grapes which are typically used to produce a full-bodied and spicy red wine called Zinfandel.

White Zinfandel was accidentally created by Sutter Home Family Vineyards winemaker Bob Trinchero in 1975. In order to concentrate the color and flavor of some Zinfandel wine he was making he drew off some juice, which separation subsequently went through a stuck fermentation but proved saleable. In 2018, Sutter Home held a significant market share in the White Zinfandel industry, accounting for 29.1% of the total dollar sales and 73.1% of the 187 mL (6.3 U.S. fl oz) segment of the market. Other wineries and beverage manufacturers also produce and sell this variety of wine.

== See also ==
- California wine
- White Merlot
- Oeil de perdrix, the style of wine that Sutter Home was making that led to White Zinfandel
