= Zinfandel =

Variety of grape

- Grape (Vitis)
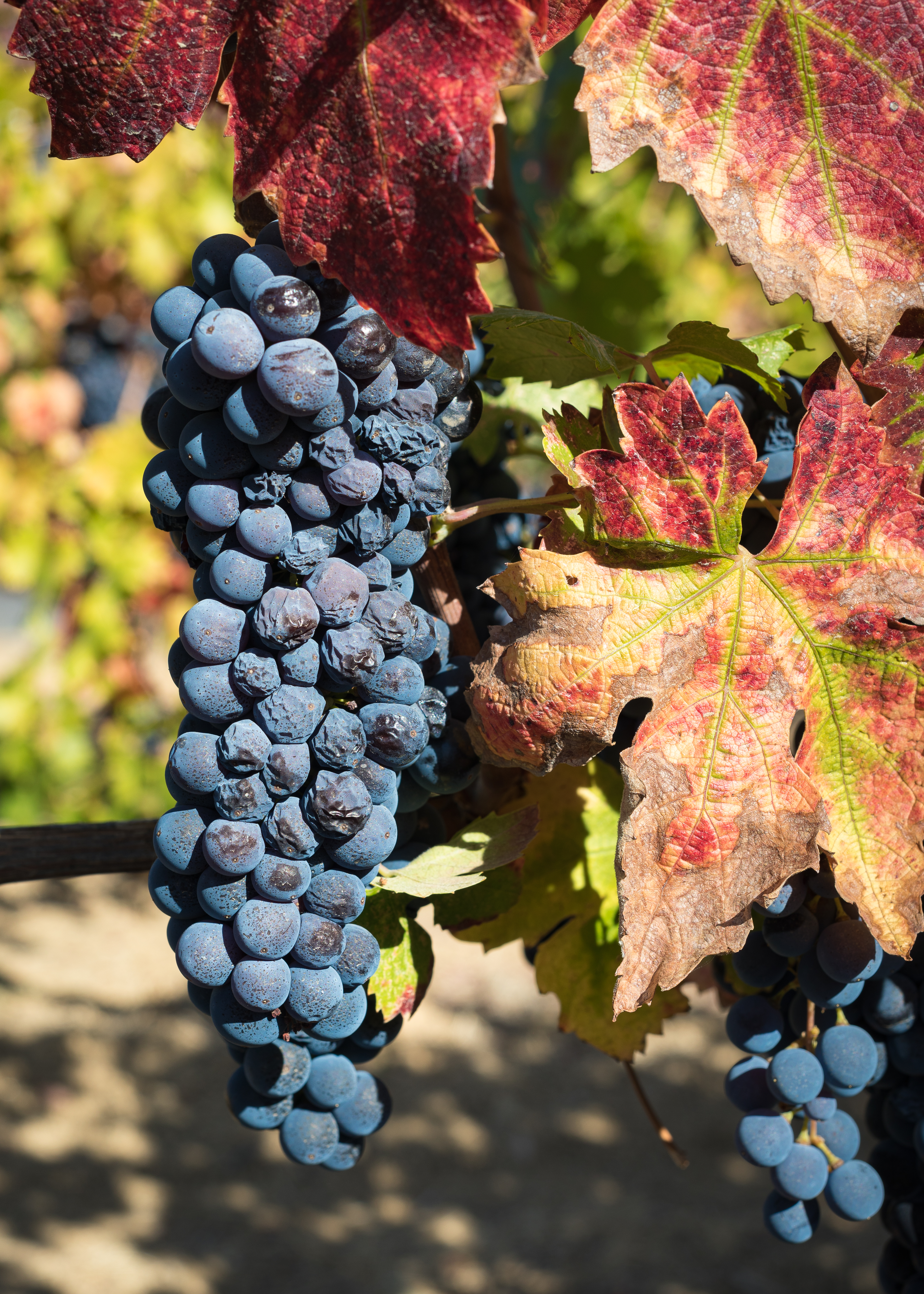
- Zinfandel grapes ripening on the vine
- Species: Vitis vinifera
- Also called: Primitivo, Kratošija, Crljenak Kaštelanski
- Origin: Uncertain, most likely Montenegro
- Notable regions: California, Apulia, Dalmatia, Skadar Lake Basin, Montenegro, Vardar River Valley, North Macedonia
- Hazards: Bunch rot, uneven ripening
- VIVC number: 9703

Zinfandel (Note: Known as Primitivo in Italian, Crljenak Kaštelanski or Tribidrag in Croatian, and Kratošija (kraˈtɔʃija) in Montenegrin.) is a variety of black-skinned wine grape. The variety is grown in over 10 percent of California vineyards.

The precise geographic origin of the cultivar remains uncertain, though peer-reviewed studies have identified Montenegro as the best candidate for its origin and dispersal. The grape spread to Italy in the 18th century and to the United States in the mid-19th century. This spread brought with it a variety of regional names for the same grape. In the 1990s, after a three-decade search, DNA analysis revealed an identical genetic identity for several of these regional names. Further DNA research in the first two decades of the 21st century confirmed Kratošija as one of these names. These names include Primitivo in Italy, Kratošija (kraˈtɔʃija) in Montenegro, and Tribidrag or Crljenak Kaštelanski in Croatia.

The grapes typically produce a robust red wine, although in the United States, a semi-sweet rosé (blush-style) wine called White Zinfandel has six times the sales of the red wine. The grape's high sugar content can be fermented into levels of alcohol exceeding 15 percent.

The taste of the red wine depends on the ripeness of the grapes from which it is made. Red berry fruit flavors like raspberry predominate in wines from cooler areas, whereas blackberry, anise and pepper notes are more common in wines made in warmer areas and in wines made from the earlier-ripening Primitivo clone.

== History ==
=== Early history in Europe ===
Archaeological evidence indicates that domestication of Vitis vinifera occurred in the Caucasus region around 6000 BCE, and winemaking was discovered shortly after that. Cultivation of the vine subsequently spread to the Mediterranean and surrounding regions.

The earliest known mention of this variety is recorded in the medieval Statute of Budva (Statuta civitatis Buduae), chapter 261, which dates to the period 1426–1442, under the name Cratosia. Another early mention of this grape dates to 1444 under the name Tribidrag, as attested by don Juraj Radičević, a priest of the church of Holy Cross in Vodice. Budva, today in Montenegro, and Vodice, today in Croatia, were both at the time part of the Venetian Republic. In Montenegro, the variety is best known as Kratošija, while in Croatia it is known as Crljenak Kaštelanski. Croatia once had several indigenous varieties related to Zinfandel, which formed the basis of its wine industry in the 19th century. These varieties were almost entirely wiped out, however, by the phylloxera epidemic of the late 19th century.

In the 20th century, leading ampelographers from Montenegro, Croatia, Serbia, and North Macedonia (the countries of the former Yugoslavia), such as Stojanović (1929), Bulić (1949), Ulićević (1959), Burić (1995), and Maraš (2000), regularly identified Kratošija as an autochthonous Montenegrin variety, noting its likely spread from Montenegro into Dalmatia and Macedonia (present-day North Macedonia). Modern international genetic research also supports that Montenegro holds the most heterogeneous and polymorphic populations of the variety, which indicates long-term cultivation in the area and subsequent dissemination to neighbouring regions. Based on these findings, the scientists concluded that Montenegro represents the best candidate for the origin of the variety.

It is assumed that the grape have been introduced as a distinct clone into Italy's Apulia region in the 18th century, then part of Kingdom of Naples. In the 1790s, Don Francesco Filippo Indellicati, the priest of the church at Gioia del Colle near Bari (across the Adriatic Sea from the Montenegrin town of Bar), selected an early ("primo") ripening plant of the Zagarese variety and planted it in Liponti. This clone ripened at the end of August and became widespread throughout northern Apulia. The first documented use of the term Primitivo appears in Italian governmental publications of the 1870s. The name derives from the terms primativus or primaticcio, which refer to the grape's tendency to ripen earlier than other varieties.

=== United States east coast (1829–1850) ===
The introduction of Zinfandel to the United States may have occurred through plant material from the Imperial Nursery in Vienna (Austria), which, according to one hypothesis, probably obtained the vines during the rule of the Habsburg monarchy over the Kingdom of Dalmatia, after the acquisition of the region from the former Republic of Venice in 1797. It's most likely that the grapevine originated from today's Montenegrin coast, or the former Venetian Albania at the time, because the Kratošija was far more commonly found in those areas under Habsburg rule as well as Montenegro and Herzegovina inland, than the Crljenak was in Dalmatia to the northwest.

George Gibbs, a horticulturist on Long Island, received shipments of grapes from Schönbrunn and elsewhere in Europe between 1820 and 1829. Sullivan suggests that the "Black Zinfardel of Hungary" mentioned by William Robert Prince in A Treatise on the Vine (1830) may have referred to one of Gibbs's 1829 acquisitions. Webster suggests that the name is a modification of the Hungarian tzinifándli (czirifandli), which derives from the German Zierfandler, a white grape (Grüner Sylvaner) from Austria's Thermenregion.

Gibbs visited Boston in 1830, and Samuel Perkins of that city began selling "Zenfendal" soon afterward. In 1830, Gibbs also supplied Prince with "Black St. Peters," variety. Little is known about this vine, except that the Black St. Peters that arrived in California in the 1850s was the same as what became known as Zinfandel by the 1870s.

By 1835 Charles M. Hovey, Boston's leading nurseryman, was recommending "Zinfindal" as a table grape. It was soon widely grown in heated greenhouses to produce table grapes as early as June. The first reference to making wine from "Zinfindal" appears in John Fisk Allen's Practical Treatise in the Culture and Treatment of the Grape Vine (1847). Meanwhile, the fad for hothouse cultivation faded in the 1850s as attention turned to the Concord and other grape varieties that could be grown outdoors in Boston.

=== California (1850–1933) ===
Prince and other nurserymen, such as Frederick W. Macondray (future son-in-law of Faxon Atherton), joined the California Gold Rush in the 1850s and took Zinfandel with them. Prince's notebook records that the grape dried "perfectly to Raisin" and that he believed his Zinfandel was the same as the "Black Sonora" he found in California. When the vine known as "Black St. Peters" arrived in California, it was initially regarded as a distinct variety, but by the 1870s, it was recognized as the same grape as Zinfandel.

Sacramento nurseryman A.P. Smith listed "Black St. Peter's" among the 24 grape varieties he was propagating in a sales catalog in 1856 and he exhibited "Zeinfindall" at the state fair in 1858. Joseph W. Osborne planted Zinfandel from Macondray at his Oak Knoll vineyard just north of Napa, and his wine was much praised in 1857. Planting of Zinfandel boomed soon after, and by the end of the 19th century, it was the most widespread variety in California.

These Zinfandel old vines are now treasured for the production of premium red wine, but many were ripped up in the 1920s, during the Prohibition years (1920–1933), but not for the obvious reason. Even during the Prohibition, home winemaking remained effectively legal, and some vineyards embraced the sale of grapes for making wine at home. While Zinfandel grapes proved popular among home winemakers living near the vineyards, it was vulnerable to rot on the long journey to East Coast markets. The thick-skinned Alicante Bouschet was less susceptible to rot, so this and similar varieties were widely planted for the home winemaking market. In 1931, 3,000 cars – about 38,000 short tons (34,000 t) – of Zinfandel grapes were shipped, compared to 6,000 cars of Alicante Bouschet.

=== Rediscovery after Prohibition (1933–present) ===
By 1930, the wine industry had weakened due to the Great Depression and Prohibition. Many vineyards that survived by supplying the home market were located in California's Central Valley, a non-optimal environment for growing quality Zinfandel. Thus, the end of Prohibition left a shortage of quality wine grapes, and Zinfandel sank into obscurity as most was blended into undistinguished fortified wines. However, some producers remained interested in making single varietal red wines.

By the middle of the 20th century, the origins of California Zinfandel had been forgotten. In 1972, one British wine writer wrote, "there is a fascinating Californian grape, the zinfandel, said to have come from Hungary, but apparently, a cépage now unknown there." In 1974 and 1981, American wine writers described it as "a California original, grown nowhere else" and "California's own red grape".

In 1972, Bob Trinchero of the Sutter Home Winery decided to try draining some juice from the vats to impart more tannins and color to his Deaver Vineyard Zinfandel. He vinified this juice as a dry wine, and tried to sell it under the name of Oeil de Perdrix, a Swiss wine made by this saignée method. The Bureau of Alcohol, Tobacco and Firearms insisted on an English translation, so he added "White Zinfandel" to the name, and sold 220 cases. At the time, demand for white wine exceeded the availability of white wine grapes, encouraging other California producers to make "white" wine from red grapes, with minimal skin contact. However, in 1975, Trinchero's wine experienced a stuck fermentation, a problem in which the yeast dies off before all the sugar is converted to alcohol. He put the wine aside for two weeks, tasted it, and decided to sell this pinker, sugary wine. Just as Mateus Rosé had become a huge success in Europe after World War II, this medium sweet White Zinfandel became immensely popular. White Zinfandel still accounts for 9.9% of U.S. wine sales by volume (6.3% by value), six times the sales of red Zinfandel. Most white Zinfandel is made from grapes grown for that purpose in California's Central Valley.

Wine critics considered white Zinfandel to be insipid and uninteresting in the 1970s and 1980s, although modern white Zinfandels have more fruit and less cloying sweetness. Nevertheless, the success of this blush wine saved many old vines in premium areas, which came into their own at the end of the 20th century as red Zinfandel wines came back into fashion. Although the two wines taste dramatically different, both are made from the same (red) grapes but processed differently.

== Relationship to Primitivo, Crljenak Kaštelanski, and Kratošija ==
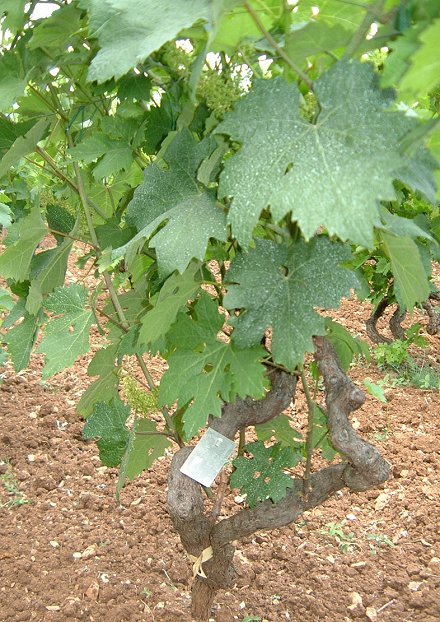
A vine of Crljenak Kaštelanski, in the vineyard where it was discovered. The metal tag from the University of Zagreb indicates that this vine is reserved for genetic research.

Some of the 419 Kratošija vine samples labeled for genetic research from different locations in Montenegro

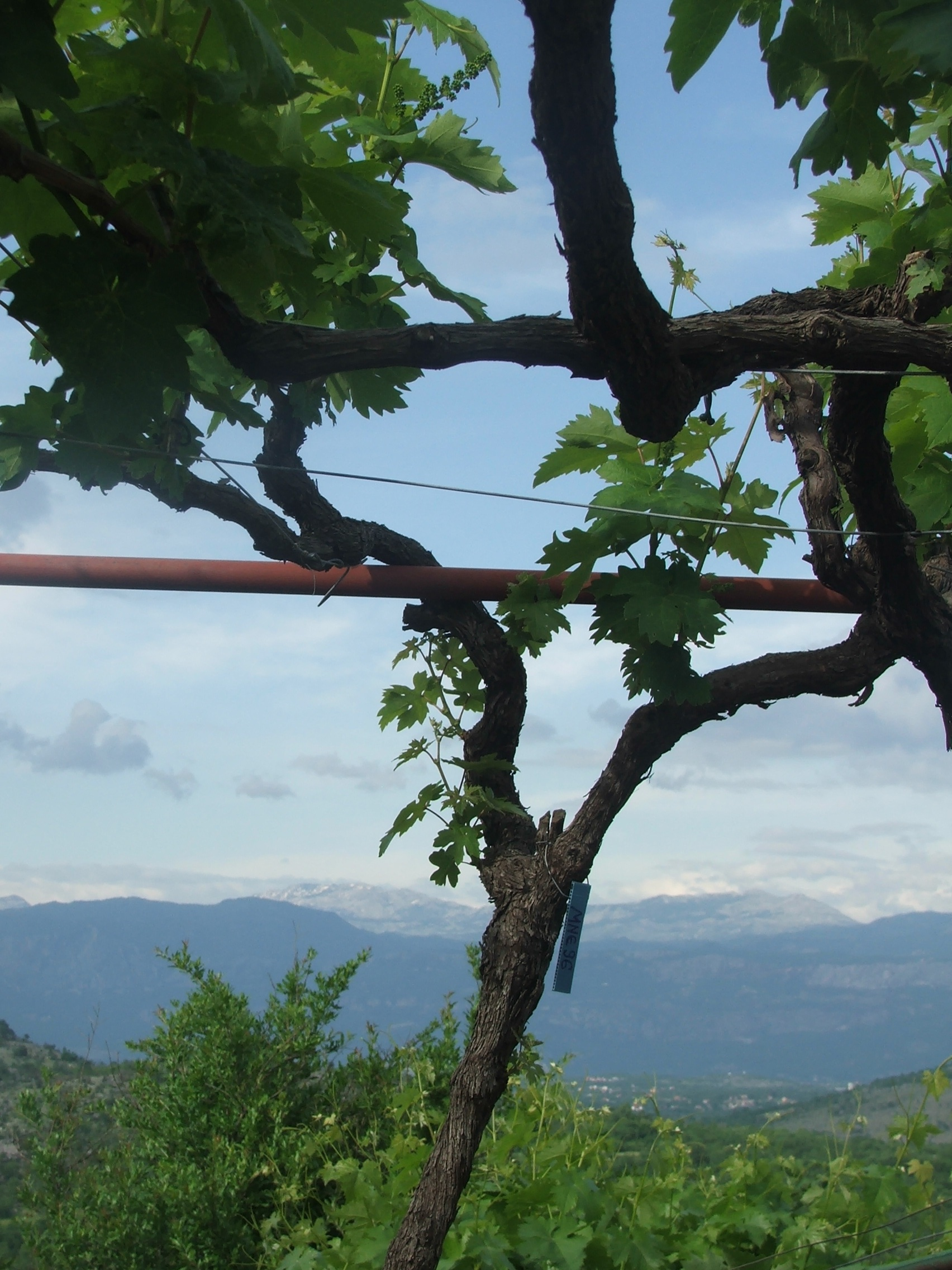
Sample of Kratošija no. 96, Baločke rupice

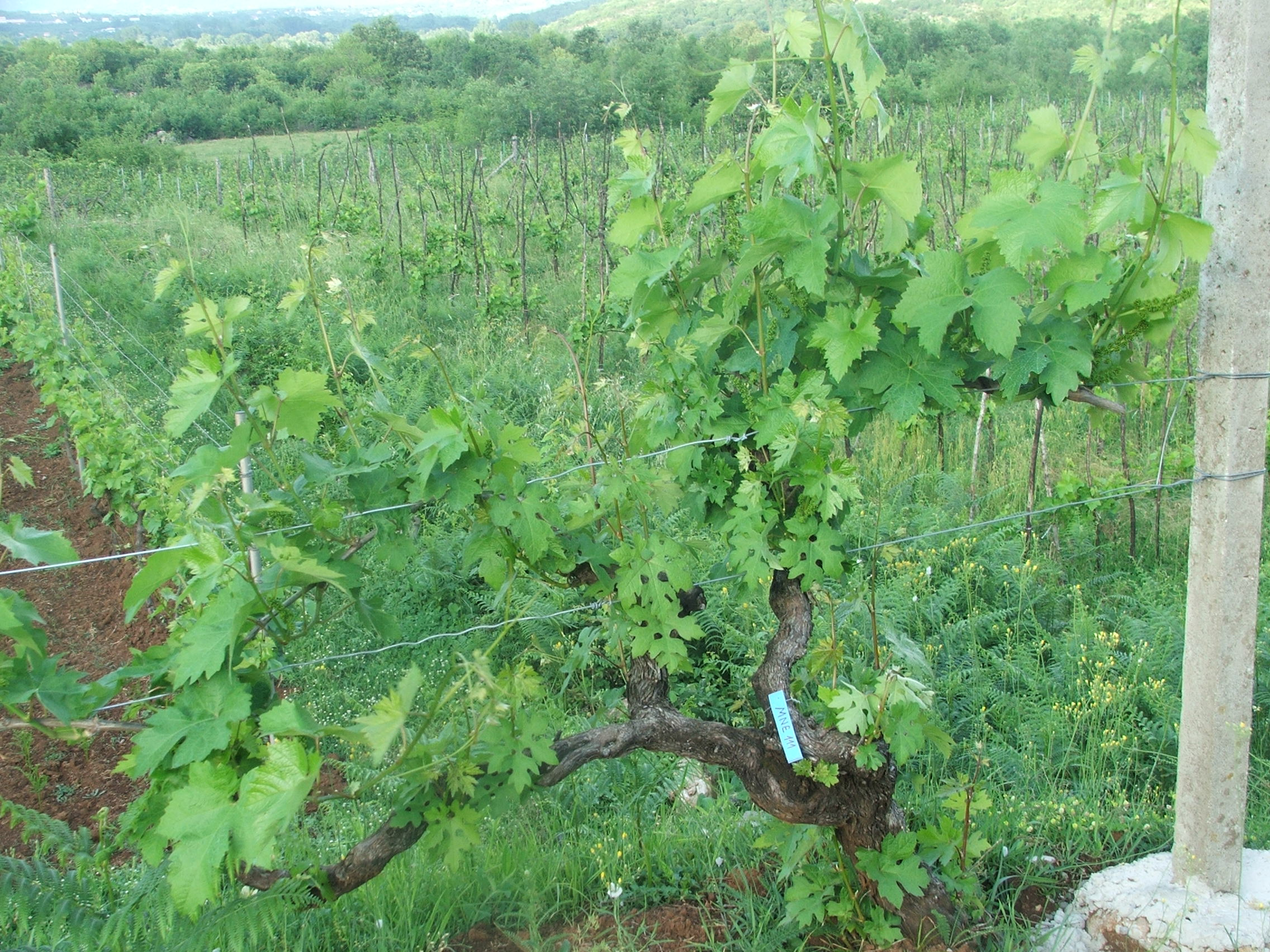
Sample of Kratošija no. 111, Komanske rupice

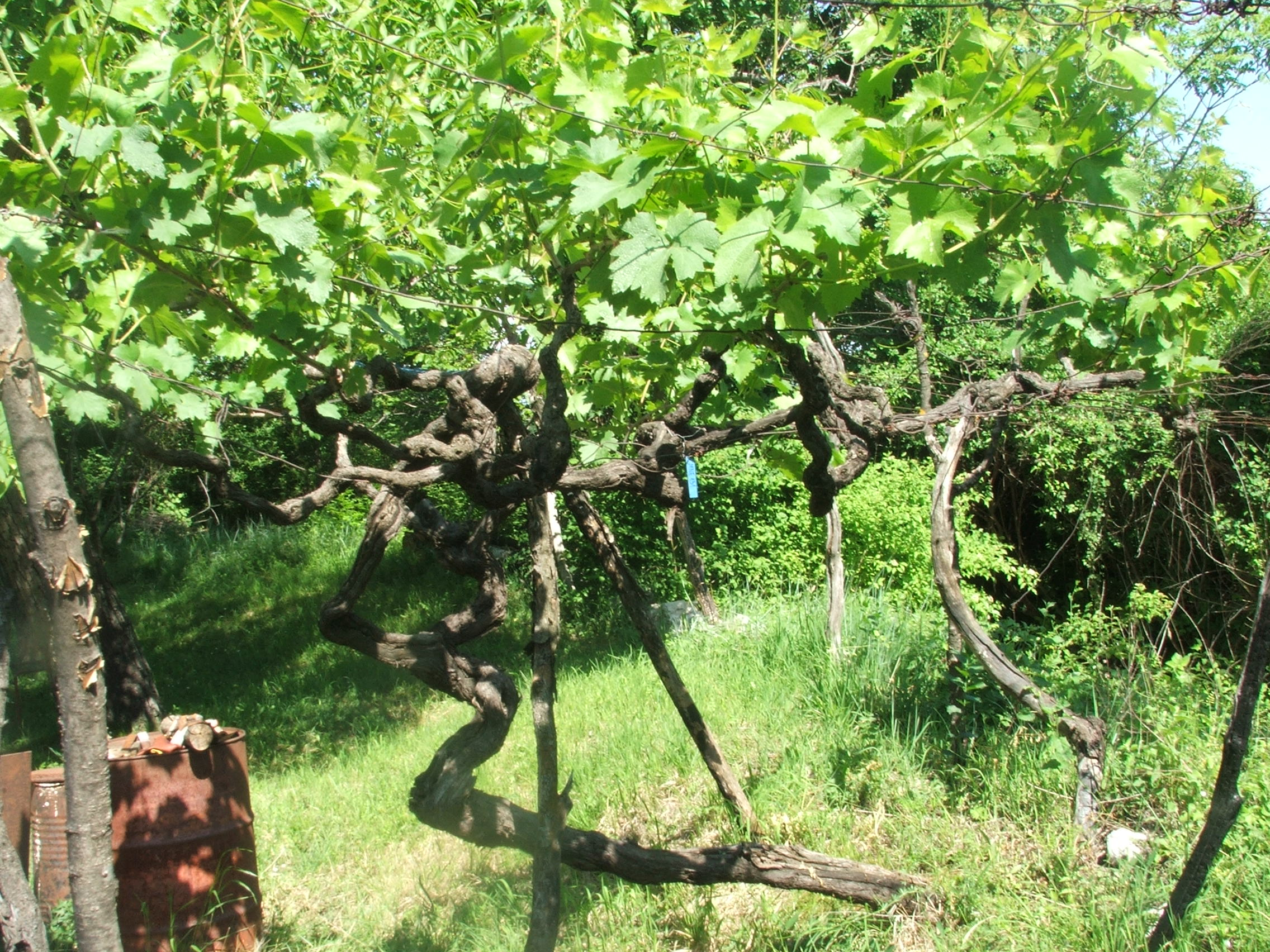
Experimental sample of Kratošija no. 131, Kuči – Burum

Zinfandel was long considered "America's vine and wine", but when University of California, Davis (UCD) professor Austin Goheen visited Italy in 1967, he noticed how the wine made from Primitivo reminded him of Zinfandel. Others also made the connection about that time. Primitivo was brought to California in 1968, and ampelographers declared it identical to Zinfandel in 1972. The first wine made from these California vines in 1975 also seemed identical to Zinfandel. In 1975, Ph.D. student Wade Wolfe showed that the two varieties had identical isozyme fingerprints.

An earlier line of research on Zinfandel can be found in Ulićević (1959) Ulićević identified through ampelographic analysis that Zinfandel, which he described as the oldest and most widely represented Californian variety, is identical with the Montenegrin variety Kratošija and probably originated in this region, from which it was introduced to the United States by Montenegrin emigrants. He stated that Kratošija is the main and probably the oldest Montenegrin variety. It is dominant in all vineyards older than 60–70 years. It represented about 90% of grapevine assortments in the Montenegrin viticultural areas of the Skadar lake region and was even more present in the coastal area.

Even earlier, the Dalmatian ampelographer Bulić (1949) described Kratošija, also under the synonyms "Gartošija", "Grakošija" and "Kratkošija", in nine municipalities of the Montenegrin coast: Budva, Grbalj, Luštica, Krtole, Kotor, Paštrovići, Prčanj, Tivat and Herceg Novi. Bulić also stated that this variety was only rarely found in Dalmatia and had most likely spread there from Montenegro. By 2001, only about twenty surviving vines of Crljenak Kaštelanski had been identified in Dalmatia.

Dr. Lamberti of Bari had suggested to Goheen in 1976 that Primitivo might be the Croatian variety Plavac Mali By 1982, Goheen had confirmed that they were similar but not identical, probably by isozyme analysis.

In 1993, Meredith used a DNA fingerprinting technique to confirm that Primitivo and Zinfandel were clones of the same variety. Comparative field trials have found that "Primitivo selections were generally superior to those of Zinfandel, having earlier fruit maturity, similar or higher yield, and similar or lower bunch rot susceptibility.".

By 1998, Meredith's team realized that Plavac Mali was not Zinfandel, but that one was the parent of the other. In 2000 they discovered that Primitivo/Zinfandel was one parent of Plavac Mali. The other parent of Plavac Mali was determined by Ivan Pejić and Edi Maletić (University of Zagreb) to be Dobričić, an ancient variety from the Adriatic island of Šolta.

This discovery narrowed the search to the central Dalmatian coastal strip and its offshore islands. Eventually, a matching DNA fingerprint was found among the samples, from a vine sampled in 2001 in Kaštel Novi. Meredith then referred to the variety as "ZPC" – Zinfandel / Primitivo / Crljenak Kaštelanski. When Zinfandel's DNA match with Crljenak Kaštelanski was discovered in 2001 in Kaštela, its cultivation experienced a rebirth.

The 2012 book Wine Grapes Master of Wine Jancis Robinson and Julia Harding and Swiss grape geneticist Dr. José Vouillamoz detail the search for Zinfandel's origins.

However, the search for Zinfandel's origin is still not definitively settled, despite earlier assumptions. Later research has added further evidence relevant to the question of origin.

Calò et al. (2008) confirmed that the Montenegrin autochthonous ancient variety Kratošija shares identical DNA with Zinfandel and Primitivo.

Then, in Crespan et al. (2014) under the title "SSR molecular marker analysis of the grapevine germplasm of Montenegro" an international study that was conducted by the Consiglio per la Ricerca e la sperimentazione in Agricoltura, Centro di Ricerca per la Viticoltura (CRA-VIT), Conegliano Treviso, by Italian scientists and Montenegrin ampelographers. They propose Montenegro as the best candidate country for the origin and centre of dissemination of the Kratošija/Zinfandel variety. Therefore, the place of origin of this cultivar should be moved further south than the Dalmatian coast, unlike what has been previously suggested.

The following joint international research, Tello et al. (2020) under the title "Population genetic analysis in old Montenegrin vineyards reveals ancient ways currently active to generate diversity in Vitis vinifera" was conducted with the participation of the Institute of Grapevine and Wine Sciences (ICVV), La Rioja, the Biotechnical Faculty, University of Ljubljana, the Laboratorio de Entomología Aplicada, Universidad de Sevilla, the Department of Biology, University of Western Ontario, the Faculty of Biology, University of Belgrade, University of Montenegro Faculty of Biotechnology, the Faculty for Food Technology, Food Safety and Ecology, University of Donja Gorica, Podgorica, and the Research and Development Department of Plantaže, Podgorica. In this extensive study, they identified 106 Kratošija plants in old Montenegrin vineyards, widely present in all viticultural regions of Montenegro, and established that it is the parent variety (trio and duo) of almost 20 genotypes which are cultivated in Montenegro. Among them is also the autochthonous variety Vranac, whose second parent is also the Montenegrin autochthonous variety Duljenga. Montenegro showed the highest level of genetic diversity of variety Kratošija, with 17 identified biotypes, which is incomparable with other regions where the variety is grown under different synonyms.

=== Legal issues ===
Local wine-labeling regulations are slowly catching up with the DNA evidence, a process that trade disputes have slowed. The European Union recognized Zinfandel as a synonym for Primitivo in January 1999, meaning that Italian Primitivos can be labeled as Zinfandel in the United States and any other country that recognizes EU labeling laws. Italian winemakers have taken advantage of these rules and shipped Primitivo wines to the United States labeled as Zinfandels, with the approval of the Alcohol and Tobacco Tax and Trade Bureau (TTB).

As of December 2007, the TTB lists both Zinfandel and Primitivo as approved grape varieties for American wines, but they are not listed as synonyms; U.S. producers, therefore, must label a wine according to whether it is Zinfandel or Primitivo. The Bureau of Alcohol, Tobacco, Firearms and Explosives (ATF) proposed in 2002 that they be recognized as synonyms. In July 2008, the proposed regulation (RIN 1513–AA32, formerly RIN 1512-AC65) was withdrawn.

== Distribution and wines ==
=== United States ===
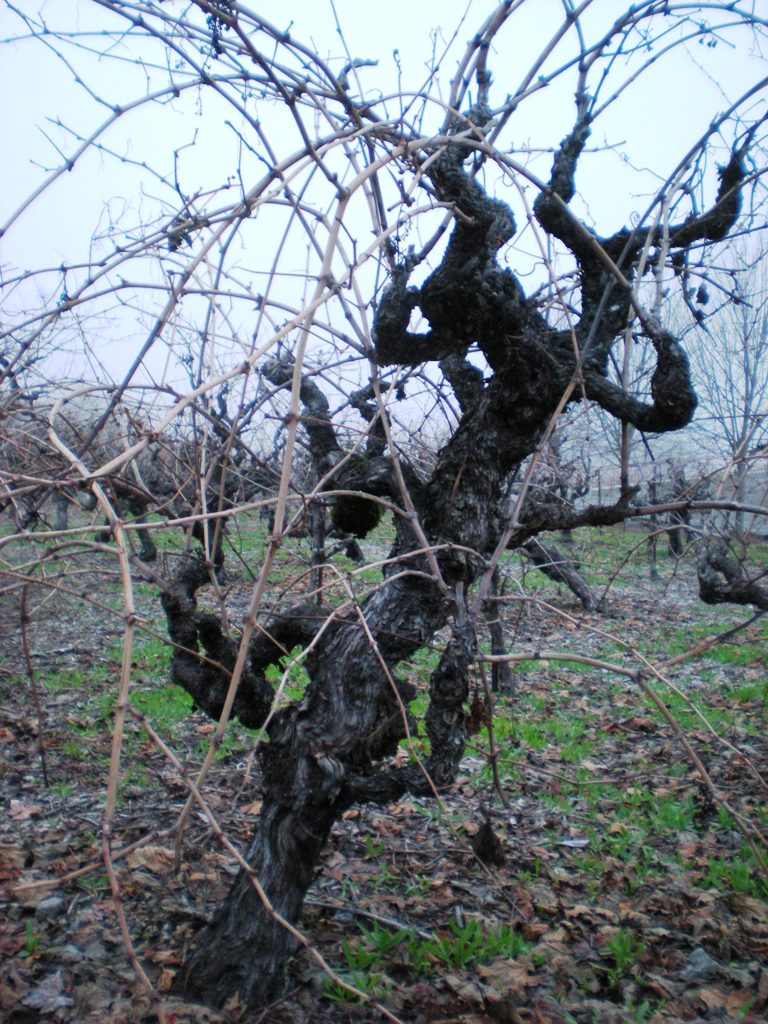
Gnarly zinfandel grape vines in Sonoma, California, in the winter

Zinfandel is grown across the continental United States, although California grows the largest proportion. U.S. producers make wine in styles that range from late harvest dessert wines, rosés (White Zinfandel) and Beaujolais-style light reds to big hearty reds and fortified wine in the style of port. The quality and character of American Zinfandel wines largely depend on the climate, location, and age of the vineyard in which they are grown, as well as the technology employed by the winemaker.

Historically, California Zinfandel vines were planted as a field blend interspersed with Durif (Petite Sirah), Carignan, Grenache, Mourvèdre, Mission and Muscat. While most vineyards are now fully segregated, California winemakers continue to use other grapes (particularly Petite Sirah) in their Zinfandel wines. Zinfandel is grown on approximately 11% of California's vineyard land area. Around 400,000 short tons (350,000 tonnes) are crushed each year, depending on the harvest, placing Zinfandel third behind Chardonnay and Cabernet Sauvignon and just ahead of Merlot.

==== California regions ====
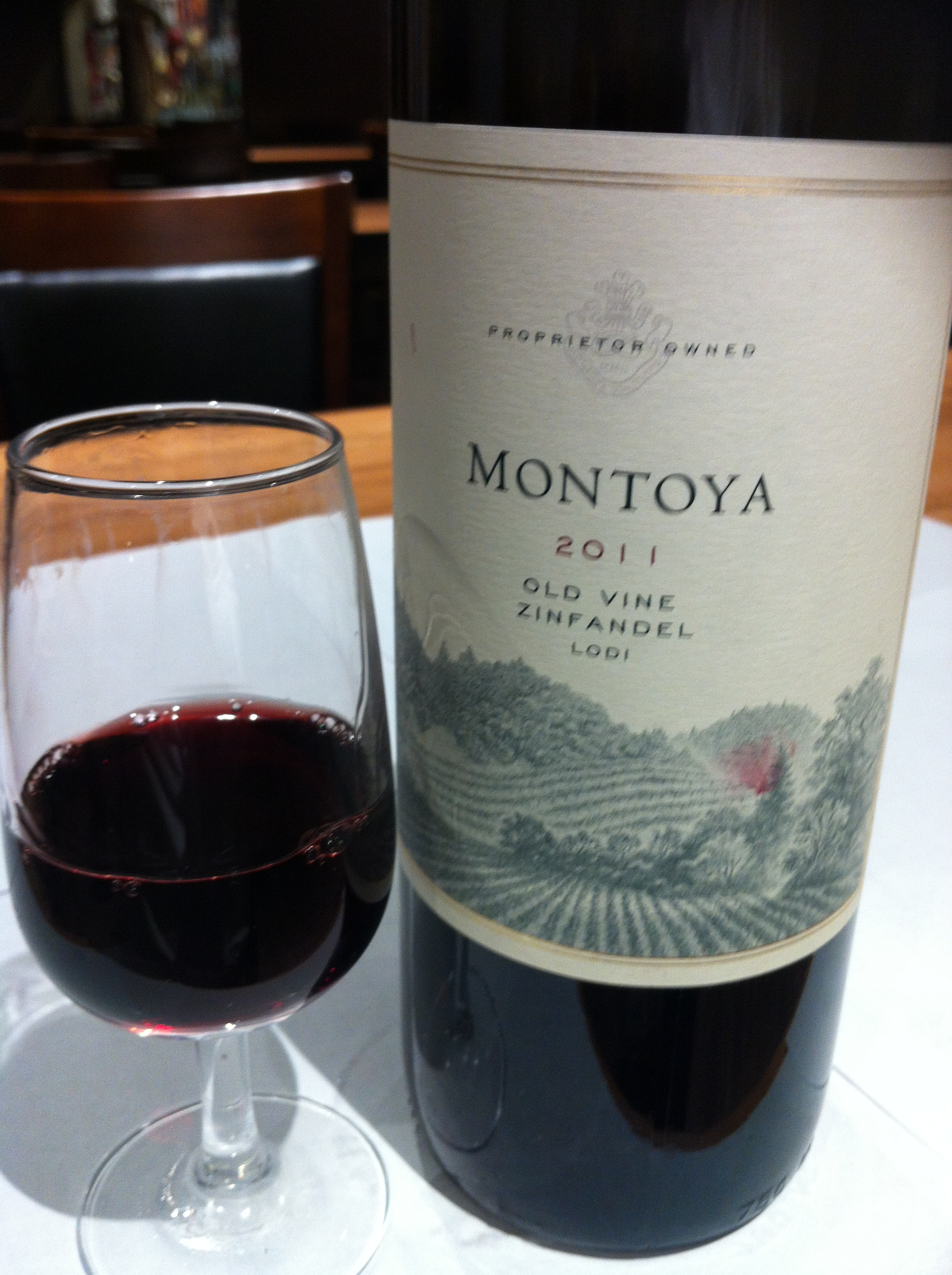
An old vine Zinfandel from the Lodi AVA of California

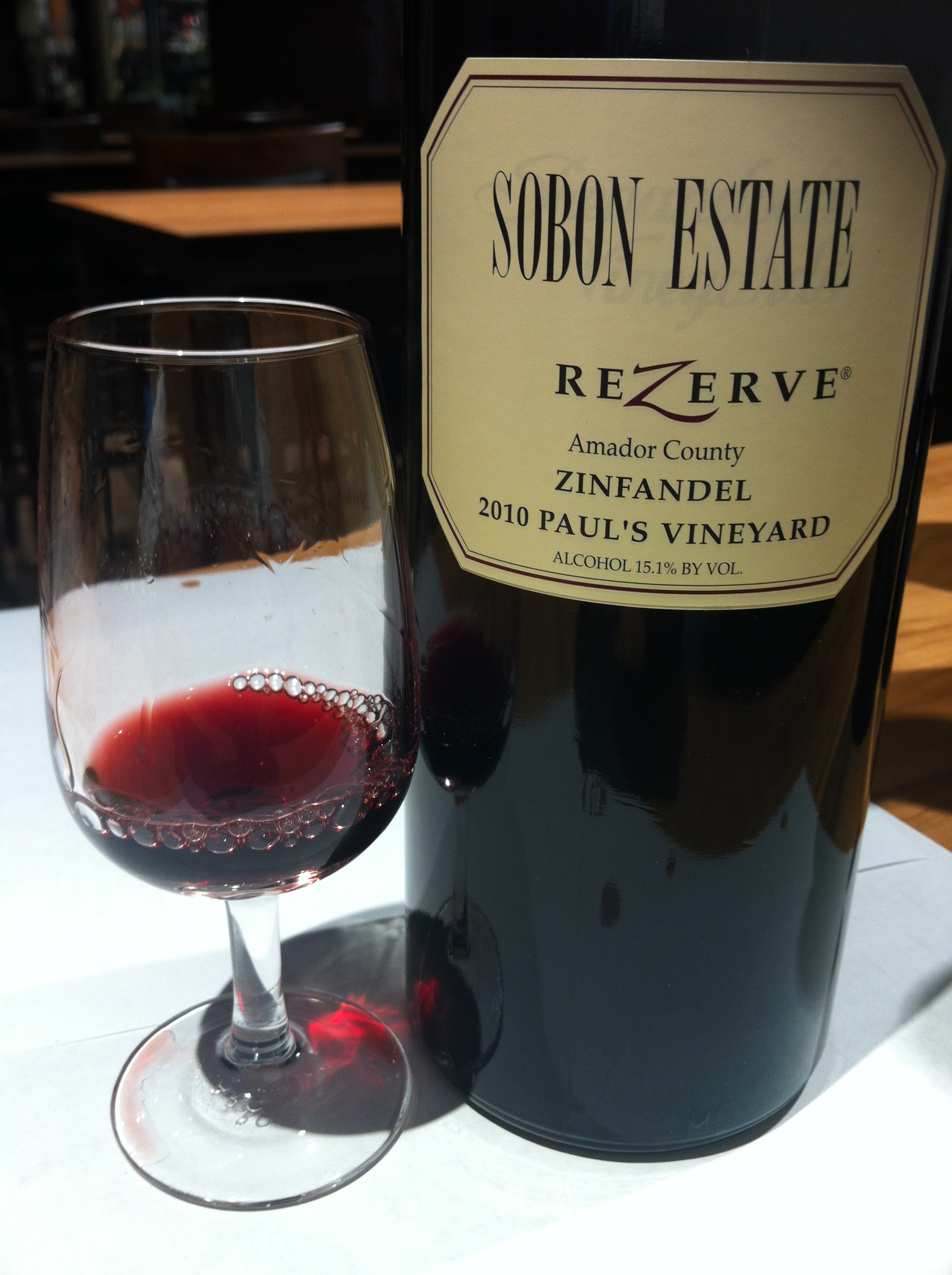
A Zinfandel from Amador County

As of 2019, there were 39,500 acres planted in Zinfandel in California. Of the state's 44 Zinfandel-growing counties, the top 10 hold some 85% of the Zinfandel growing area. However, major producing areas such as San Joaquin County, Stanislaus County, and Madera County produce Zinfandel primarily for blends or jug wine.

Certain California regions are regarded as "exceptional" for Zinfandel, each with identifiable flavor characteristics:

- Amador has a reputation for big, full-bodied Zinfandel. These extra-ripe wines have been called jammy, briary, and brambly, having aromas of sweet berries.
- Although the Santa Cruz Mountains AVA in Santa Clara Valley produces Zinfandel from just 106 acres (43 ha), the Zinfandel from that region is known for its complexity and depth.
- Sonoma county has a Zinfandel-producing land area second only to that of San Joaquin County. The county contains the warm Dry Creek Valley AVA, known for its juicy Zinfandel with bright fruit, balanced acidity and notes of blackberry, anise, and pepper. Dry Creek Valley produces Zinfandel in a variety of styles ranging from the high-alcohol Amador style to balanced, spicy wines.
- San Luis Obispo, particularly the Paso Robles AVA with its hot days and cool maritime evenings, produces Zinfandel known for being soft and round.
- While the Napa Valley AVA is known primarily for its Cabernet Sauvignon, Merlot, and Syrah, Napa also produces Zinfandel wines described as plummy and intense, tasting of red berry fruits with cedar and vanilla. Zinfandel in Napa tends to be made in a claret style like red Bordeaux.
- The Russian River Valley generally produces well during warm vintages. Otherwise, the grapes do not fully ripen, leaving the wines with excessive acidity. The area has mostly "old vine" Zinfandel, characterized as spicy and somewhat lower in alcohol than Zinfandel from other regions.
- Mendocino County Zinfandel wines have been considered high quality, but they are less known because they are not heavily marketed.
- Lodi has some of the oldest Zinfandel vines in California. While often used for White Zinfandel production in the red style, Lodi Zinfandels have a reputation for being juicy and approachable.

=== Italy ===
Most Primitivo is grown in Apulia, a coastal region known as the "heel" of Italy, and it is estimated to be the country's 12th most widely planted grape variety. The main three DOC areas are Primitivo di Manduria, Gioia del Colle Primitivo (Riserva) and Falerno del Massico Primitivo (Riserva o Vecchio). The Manduria DOC covers still red wine as well as sweet (Dolce Naturale) and fortified (Liquoroso Dolce Naturale, Liquoroso Secco) wine. Falerno requires a minimum of 85% Primitivo; the others are 100% Primitivo. Gioia del Colle Rosso and Rosato contain 50–60% Primitivo, and Cilento Rosso/Rosato contains around 15%.

Historically, the grape was fermented and shipped north to Tuscany and Piedmont, where it was used as a blending grape to enhance the body of thin red wines produced in those areas. When the link between Primitivo and Zinfandel began to emerge, plantings in the region and production of non-blended varietals increased. Today, most Italian Primitivo is made as a rustic, highly alcoholic red wine with up to 16% alcohol by volume (ABV). Some Italian winemakers age the wines in new American oak to imitate American-style Zinfandel.

=== Montenegro ===
The ancient variety Kratošija is present ( survived) in all the viticultural regions of Montenegro with wide variability of the population and the impressive high number of different names. Montenegro showed the highest level of genetic diversity of this variety, with as many as 17 identified biotypes, compared to other regions where the variety is cultivated under different synonyms.

Analysis of data from the Montenegrin Vineyard Register today, indicates that 50.50% of all registered grape growers in Montenegro cultivate Kratošija, and that the variety ranks second by planted area among family agricultural holdings. Based on the document Study on the Zoning of Viticultural Geographical Production Areas of Montenegro (2017)., the viticultural areas of Montenegro are divided into the Skadar Lake Basin Region, with seven subregions; the Montenegrin Coast Region, with four subregions; and the Nudo Region. The Crmnica subregion is often highlighted because of its exceptional potential. It is stated that the area offers favourable conditions in terms of the intensity of the coloration of the skins of grape berries and the accumulation of aromatic substances, which is crucial for high-quality red wines of the Kratošija–Vranac type.

Historically:

Kratošija is a very old variety, one of the oldest surviving varieties in the Balkans.

At the end of the 19th and the beginning of the 20th century, it dominated all plantings and made up 90% of the assortment in the vineyards of the Skadar Lake Basin region, and it was also cultivated on the Coast. At the beginning of the 20th century, the cultivation range of Kratošija was 100–150 km. According to Ulićević (1959) 'Kratošija' was dominant in all vineyards older than 60–70 years. Moreover, often it represented about 90% of grapevine assortments in the viticultural areas of Skadar region and it was even more present in the coast area. In 1977, the share of Kratošija in the assortment of red wine grape varieties in vineyards in the social sector was 10%, while in vineyards in the private sector it was 48%.

Kratošija wine is characterized by an intense ruby-red colour and aromas of red berry fruits, and its structure is described as light and harmonious, with a smooth finish. Kratošija is mainly found as an accompanying the autochthonous Montenegrin grape variety Vranac, in the production of wine from a blend of these two varieties.

=== Croatia ===
The Croatian form Crljenak Kaštelanski was not bottled in Croatia as a varietal in its own right before the link to Zinfandel was revealed. UCD has since sent clones of both Zinfandel and Primitivo to Professor Maletić in Croatia, which he planted on the island of Hvar. He made his first ZPC wines in Croatia in 2005. There is high demand for red grapes in the country, and the government has supported ongoing research. Figures from the department of viticulture and enology at the University of Zagreb claim that from only 22 vines of Crljenak Kaštelanski in Croatia in 2001, there were about 2,000 vines in 2008.

=== Other locations ===
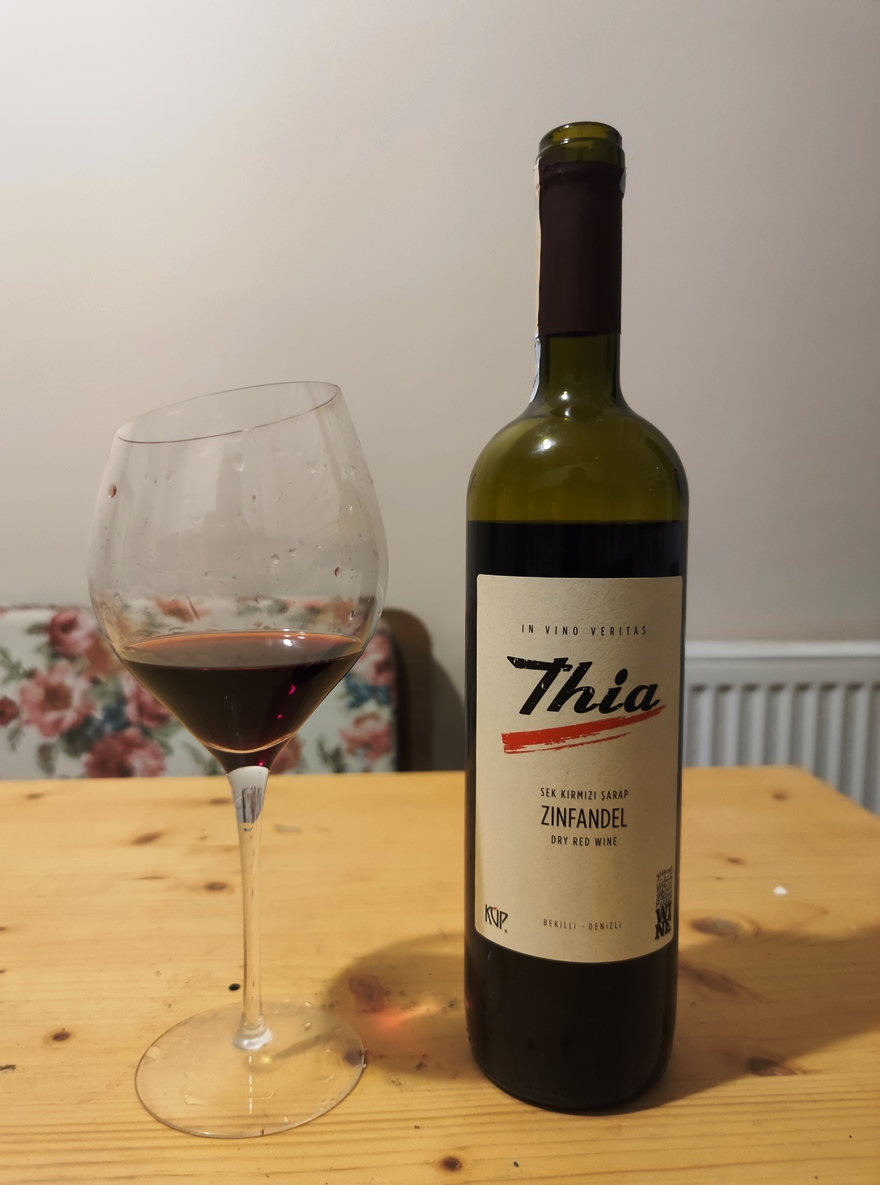
A Zinfandel wine from Bekilli, Denizli region, Turkey

Old vine Zinfandel plantings dating from the 1930s have been found in Baja California, Mexico. There are also small Zinfandel plantings in Western Australia, Mudgee in New South Wales and the McLaren Vale area of South Australia. South Africa has a small production of Zinfandel, including one estate rated among the country's Zinfandel producers and winner of an international prize. In France, there is a single hectare of Zinfandel grown in the Côtes de Thongue region, sold by Domaine de l'Arjolle.

== Viticulture and winemaking ==
Zinfandel vines are quite vigorous and grow best in warm but not too hot climates because grapes may shrivel in hot weather. Zinfandel's thin-skinned grapes grow in large, tight bunches that are sometimes prone to bunch rot. The fruit ripens reasonably early and produces juice with high sugar content. If weather conditions permit, the grapes may be late-harvested to make dessert wine. Zinfandel is often praised for its ability to reflect both its terroir and its winemaker's style and skill.

The grapes exhibit an uneven pattern of ripening: a single bunch may contain both raisin-like, over-ripe grapes, and green, unripened grapes. Some winemakers choose to vinify the bunches with these varying levels of ripeness, while others hand-harvest the bunches, even by single berries, in multiple passes through the vineyards over several weeks. This extensively laborious practice is one component of the high cost of some Zinfandels.

Red Zinfandel wines have been criticized for being too "hot" (too alcoholic), although modern winemaking techniques have helped make them more approachable. On the other hand, Zinfandel producers such as Joel Peterson of Ravenswood believe that alcohol-removing technologies, such as reverse osmosis and spinning cones, remove a sense of terroir from the wine. If a wine has the tannins and other components to balance 15% alcohol, Peterson argues, it should be accepted on its terms.

Factors that affect the wine's flavors include the length of fermentation, length of the maceration period with skin contact, the level of oak aging, and the degrees Brix of the harvested grapes. White Zinfandel is normally harvested early at 20°Bx when the grapes have yet to develop much varietal character, though some examples can develop hints of tobacco and apple skin. At 23°Bx (the degree that most red wine is considered "ripe"), strawberry flavors develop. Cherry flavors appear at 24°Bx followed by blackberry notes at 25°Bx.

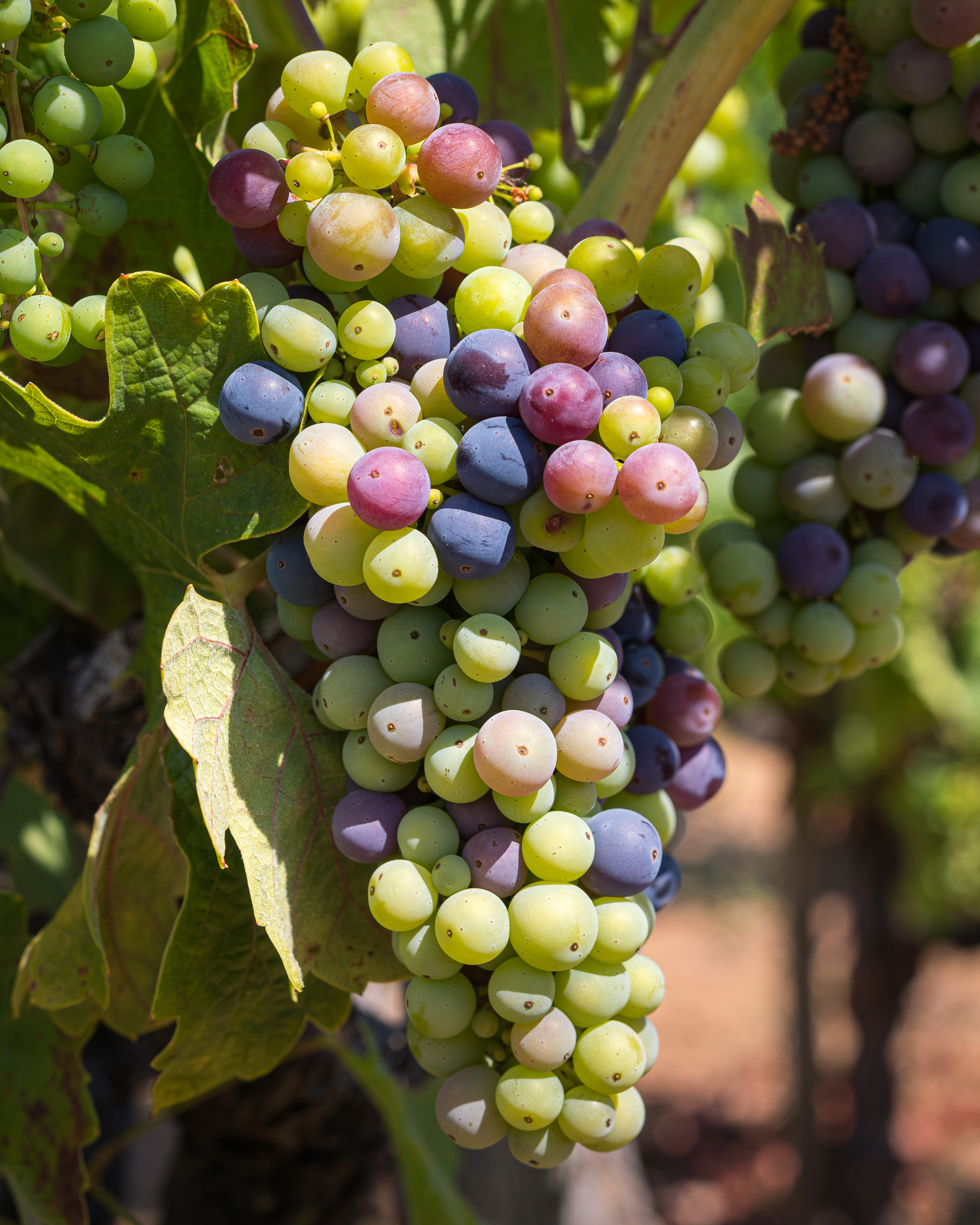
Zinfandel grapes during veraison

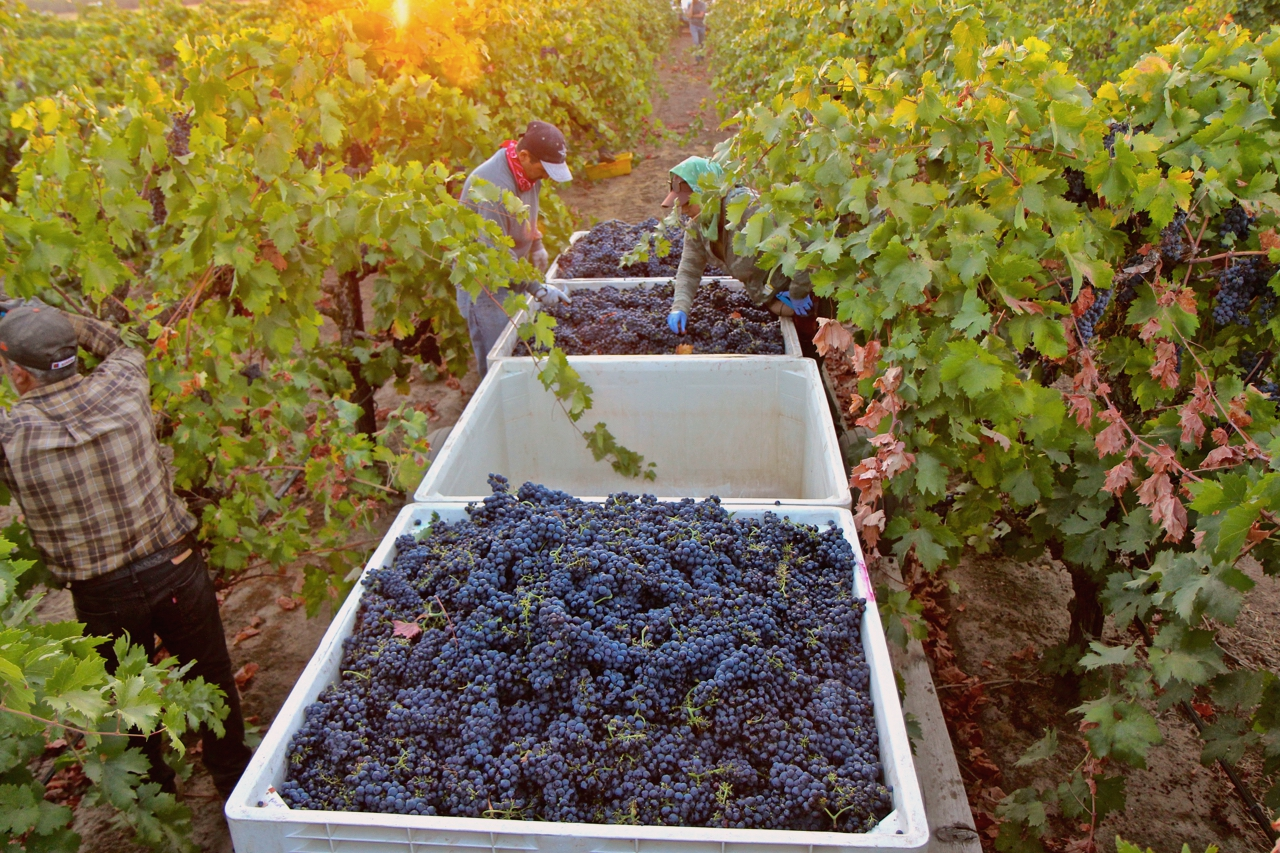
Harvesting of Zinfandel grapes

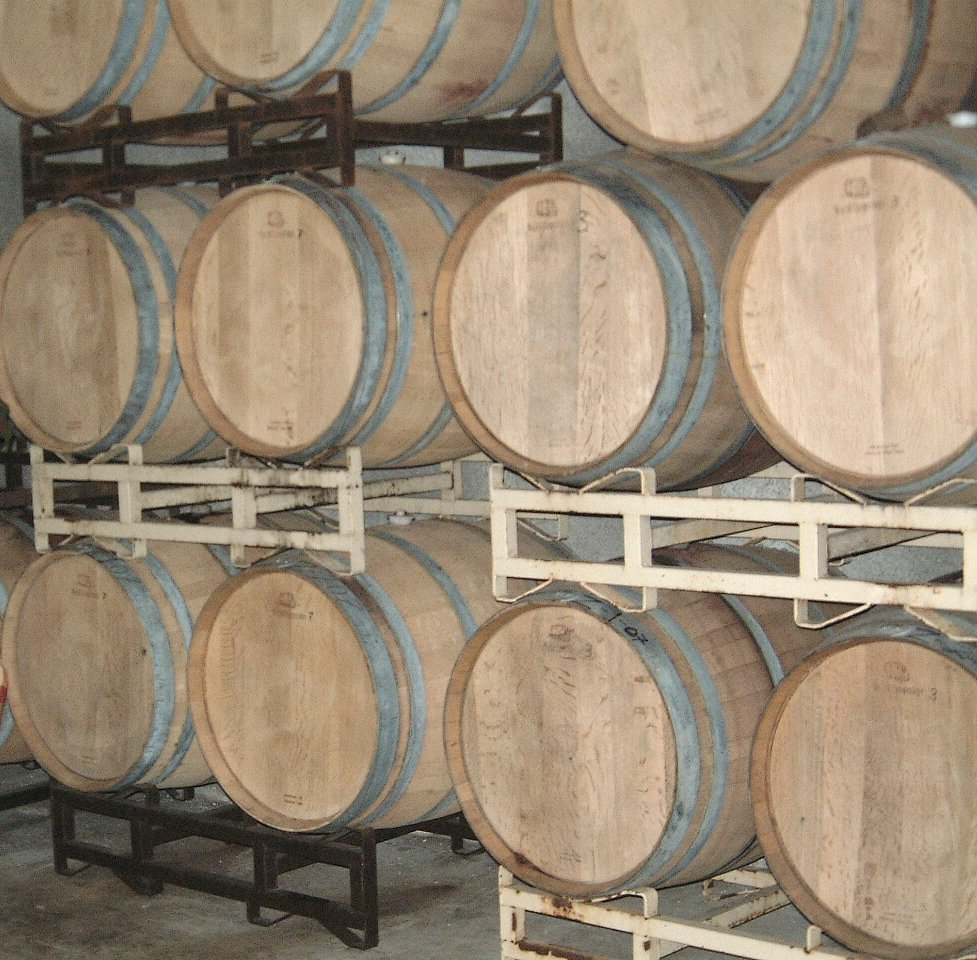
Some Zinfandel wines are barrel aged in oak

== See also ==
- Croatian wine
- Paul Draper – chief winemaker at Ridge Vineyards, pioneer of California Zinfandel
- Mike Grgich – winemaker advocate of Zinfandel who funded genetic research
- Plavac Mali – a grape variety descended from parents Zinfandel and Dobričić
- Susumaniello – Pugliese grape that also probably came from Dalmatia
