= Stuck fermentation =

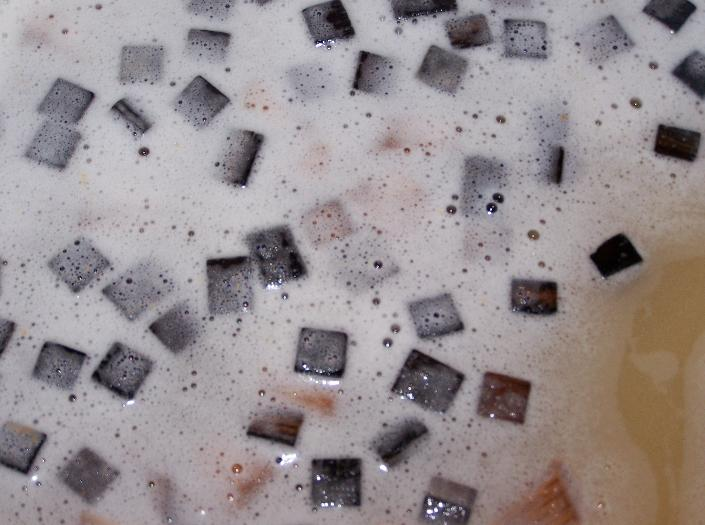
Chardonnay grape juice fermenting; the black squares are chips of oak

A stuck fermentation is the term used in brewing beer or winemaking when the yeast becomes dormant before the fermentation has completed. Unlike an "arrested fermentation", where the winemaker intentionally stops fermentation (such as in the production of fortified wines), a stuck fermentation is an unintentional and unwanted occurrence that can lead to the wine being spoiled by bacteria and oxidation.

There are several potential causes of a stuck fermentation; the most common are an excessively high temperature killing off the yeast, or a must deficient in the nitrogen food source needed for the yeast to thrive. Once the fermentation is stuck, it is very difficult to restart due to a chemical compound released by dying yeast cells that inhibits the future growth of yeast cells in the batch. Winemakers often take several steps to limit the possibility of a stuck fermentation occurring, such as adding nitrogen to the must in the form of diammonium phosphate or using cultured yeast with a high temperature and alcohol tolerance. These steps will each have their own subtle or dramatic effect on the resulting flavors and quality of the wine.

== Causes ==
There are several potential instigators of a stuck fermentation. One of the most common found in winemaking is a nitrogen deficient must. Nitrogen is a vital nutrient in the growth and development of yeasts and is usually provided from the wine grapes themselves. Grapes grown in vineyards with soils lacking in nitrogen or grape varieties, such as Chardonnay and Riesling, which are naturally prone to have low nitrogen to sugar ratios will be at greater risk for having a stuck fermentation. Another cause rooted in the vineyard is from overripe grapes. Grapes that are overripe will have high levels of sugars that translate into higher alcohol content. Yeast are unable to reproduce in an environment with 16-18% ABV; in an environment with multiple stressors the fermentation could get stuck even before the alcohol level reaches that point.

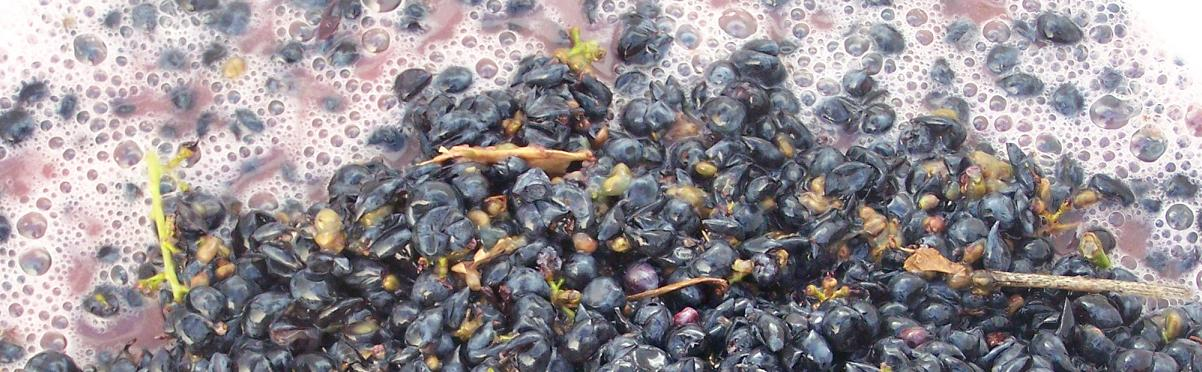
The skins included in the fermentation of red wine provide some nutrients to the yeast

A byproduct of the energy created during fermentation is heat. which raises the temperature of the fermenting must as the yeast works. When temperatures near 104°F (40°C), activity slows and yeast starts to die. If temperatures stay high and the yeast stops reproducing then the fermentation is at grave risk of getting stuck. Even if the must is cooled back down, fermentation will be very difficult to restart due to a chemical compound released by the dying yeast that serves as an inhibitor to the growth of future yeast cells in the batch.

Modern winemaking equipment includes temperature control mechanisms such as stainless steel fermenting tanks with a cooling jacket to help regulate temperatures.

Another potential cause is a combination of lack of oxygen and yeast nutrients found in the lipids suspended in grape solids. In the absence of oxygen, yeast will seek out the lipids in grape solid as a source of nutrients to sustain its activity. If the wine is lacking grape solids (such as a wine that has been clarified) the yeast are at risk of starving and causing the fermentation to get stuck. This risk is lower for red wines, which are often fermented with their skins in open air containers or oak wine barrels which provide plenty of oxygen and grape solids for the yeast to feed on.

== Prevention ==
Among the most common techniques employed to minimize the chances of a stuck fermentation are using a cultured yeast strain with a high alcohol and high temperature tolerance, coupled with diligent control of the fermentation temperature. Another is to add yeast nutrients like nitrogen to the must. The ammonium salt diammonium phosphate, or yeast nutrient, is a popular inexpensive means of ensuring the must has sufficient nitrogen. Any of these approaches has the potential to subtly or drastically affect the resulting flavor and quality of the wine.
