= Zinfandel Advocates and Producers =

The Zinfandel Advocates and Producers (ZAP) is a consortium of over 200 winemakers and grape growers, as well as thousands of consumers, with the purpose of advocating, preserving, and educating about the Zinfandel grape. Started in 1991, the organizational structure of combining wine enthusiasts with wine producers served as a successful template for other wine-related organizations, such as the Rhone Rangers. ZAP is reported to be one of the largest consumer-based wine advocacy groups in the world.

The organization's primary functions are:

- Producing The Zinfandel Experience, an annual event consisting of Zinfandel-oriented seminars and wine tastings which attracts thousands of participants to San Francisco each year.
- The Zinfandel Heritage Vineyard Project, a collaboration with the UC Davis' oenology department, which is dedicated to preserving Zinfandel vines from historic vineyards, identifying the various Zinfandel selections, helping wineries obtain cuttings from the unique Zinfandel selections, and researching growing differentiations in multiple locations.
- Local and regional seminars, tastings and wine events across the USA, designed to educate consumers, retailers and restaurateurs about the Zinfandel grape.
- Acting as an active resource for media information and research on Zinfandel.
- Partnering with the Historic Vineyard Society to preserve and protect old vineyards from being destroyed or neglected.
- Advocating legislation for recognition of Zinfandel as America’s Heritage grape.
- Funding scholarships for wine-related studies.

== Early history and the Zinfandel Experience ==
The California wine industry shifted from an emphasis on low-cost bulk wine production to a region capable of creating world-class wines after the Judgment of Paris in 1976, where a California Cabernet Sauvignon (Stags Leap Cellars) and a California Chardonnay (Chateau Montelena) were judged to be superior to some of the best French Bordeaux and Burgundies by French wine experts at a tasting in Paris. The result gave credibility to the California wine industry, especially to the classic French varietals of Cabernet Sauvignon, Chardonnay, and Merlot.

Much of the Zinfandel grapes grown previously ended up either in jug wines, such as Gallo Hearty Burgundy, or in White Zinfandel, a sweet blush wine made from the red Zinfandel grape. However, there was a small group of dedicated winemakers who saw the potential for making a full-bodied premium wine from red Zinfandel, such as Paul Draper from Ridge Vineyards and Joel Peterson from Ravenswood.

The full-bodied red Zinfandels had developed a dedicated following among wine consumers and interest in these wines expanded. In 1992 a group of 22 Zinfandel winemakers formed the new organization called Zinfandel Advocates and Producers (ZAP) and held a tasting at the Mandarin Hotel in San Francisco. The wineries that participated in this inaugural tasting were Amador Foothill, Burgess Cellars, Chestnut Hill, Cline Cellars, Deer Park, Fetzer, Green & Red, Grgich Hills, Karly, Mark West, Meeker, Montevina, Preston, Ravenswood, Ridge Vineyards, Rosenblum Cellars, Santino, Sausal, Shenandoah, Storybook Mountain Vineyards, Sutter Home and Whaler.

The public tasting in San Francisco became an annual event, soon moving to Fort Mason and became known as ZAP’s Zinfandel Festival. With attendees traveling to this event from all over the country, ZAP expanded the Zinfandel Festival into several days of seminars and events with the main tasting attracting over 10,000 wine consumers. The additional events constituting the Zinfandel Festival included a Winemaker Dinner and Auction, a day of comparative tasting seminars called "Flights", and an evening pairing event matching dishes from dozens of fine restaurants with dozens of Zinfandels.

As the Zinfandel Festival expanded, ZAP utilized both buildings at Fort Mason in St. Francisco but in 2011, Fort Mason no longer was able to accommodate the Zinfandel Festival and it was moved to the Concourse Exhibition Center in San Francisco. In 2014, the concept and name of the festival was changed to Zinfandel Experience and it was held at the Presidio in San Francisco.

Another original event that was organized by ZAP in 2002 was Zinposium, a series of seminars, tastings, conversations with growers and winemakers, and lectures about the history and current state of Zinfandel. The Zinposium was held at the Doubletree Hotel in Rohnert Park, CA. Some of the featured speakers were Dr. Carole Meredith (UC Davis), Paul Draper (Ridge), Michael Chiarello (chef), Rayna Green (Smithsonian), Mike Grgich (Grgich Hills) Dr. Edi Maletic and Dr. Ivan Pejic (University of Zagreb), Joel Peterson (Ravenswood), Carol Shelton (Carol Shelton Wines), Charles Sullivan (author and historian), Bob Trinchero (Trinchero Family Estates), Gregory Perrucci (Accademia dei Racemi, Italy) and Dr. James Wolpert (UC Davis).

== Zinfandel Heritage Vineyard Project ==
In 1997, Zinfandel Advocates and Producers partnered with the UC Davis department of enology to initiate the Zinfandel Heritage Vineyard Project. This project had four key goals: 1) Preservation of historical Zinfandel vines, 2) Identification of different clonal selections of Zinfandel, 3) Propagation of a variety of “clean” Zinfandel selections and 4) Experimentation of how the different selections grew in different regions.

1. Preservation- A team from UC Davis visited over 100 Zinfandel vineyards across California in 1995 that were at least 60 years old to ensure the preservation of old vines and potentially unique selections of Zinfandel. These journeys were known as the “Zinfandel Safaris”. They chose 90 selections from 50 different historical vineyards and planted cuttings from those vines in the UC Davis research vineyard in Oakville, California.
2. Identification- The various selections were tested by Foundation Plant Services (FPS) at UC Davis for differentiation and for viruses. Twenty-two unique Zinfandel selections that proved virus-free were identified and cuttings were replicated and planted into a larger vineyard at the Oakville research facility.
3. Propagation- Nineteen different Zinfandel selections (3 selections were eliminated) were sent to Foundation Plant Services (FPS) at UC Davis for a “cleaning” process that ensures the resulting vines are completely disease free and certified by the California Department of Food and Agriculture for release to nurseries. This was an important part of the Zinfandel Heritage Vineyard Project, as winemakers and growers who wanted to plant high-quality Zinfandel did not have a good source of various disease-free Zinfandel vines prior to this project.
4. Experimentation- The newest phase of the Zinfandel Heritage Vineyard Project is to monitor how the different Zinfandel selections grew in different regions. The 19 different Zinfandel selections are now planted in test vineyards in Dry Creek (Sonoma County), Sonoma Valley, and in Paso Robles. The results of this research should help growers select the most suitable selections for various climates.

An additional aspect of the Zinfandel Heritage Vineyard Project was to conduct DNA analysis of Zinfandel in an effort to find the origins of the grape. Dr. Carole Meredith at UC Davis worked with the help of ZAP to determine that Zinfandel was genetically identical to an obscure Croatian grape known as “Crljenak Kaštelanski”.

Each year, the ZAP board of directors chooses a different well-known Zinfandel winemaker to produce a wine from the grapes harvested from the Zinfandel Heritage Vineyard. Among the winemakers chosen to produce the Heritage Vineyard Zinfandel are Joel Peterson (Ravenswood Winery), Chris Leamy (Terra d’Oro Winery), Scott Harvey (Scott Harvey Wines), Diane Wilson (Wilson Family Winery), Ted Seghesio (Seghesio Winery), Tom Mackey (St. Francis Winery), Dr. Jerry Seps (Storybook Mountain Vineyards), Bill Knuttel (Dry Creek Vineyard), Kent Rosenblum (Rosenblum Cellars), Paul Draper (Ridge Vineyards), Ehren Jordan (Turley Wine Cellars), Rod Berglund (Joseph Swan Vineyards), Matt Cline (Cline Cellars), Robert Biale (Robert Biale Vineyards), and Nils Venge (Saddleback Cellars).

== Regional seminars ==
ZAP conducted regional tastings and seminars in many cities across the U.S. including Washington DC, New York City, Boston, Chicago, Seattle, Portland, Orlando, Los Angeles, San Diego, Las Vegas, Denver, Charleston, Raleigh, Atlanta, Houston, Dallas and Austin. These tastings allowed wine consumers the opportunity to meet Zinfandel winemakers and learn more about the grape. One of the more atypical tastings was conducted in 2003 in a dedicated lounge car on the Amtrak Acela at over 150 mph as it traveled from Washington DC to New York City.

== Legislation experience ==
Zinfandel Advocates and Producers has been active in supporting legislation to recognize Zinfandel’s historical importance in the California wine industry, as well as the uniqueness of this grape as it flourished in America’s soil and climate. Their first involvement took place in 1999 with the introduction of Senate Resolution 132 by California Senators Dianne Feinstein and Barbara Boxer to designate the last week in January each year as Zinfandel Grape Appreciation Week. A group of over 50 ZAP members flew to Washington DC in July 1999 and were invited to host a Zinfandel tasting for Congressional members and staff in the Capitol building. The legislation did not garner the necessary votes to pass.

The next involvement with legislation by ZAP was in 2006 to support a bill introduced by California Senator Carole Migden to designate Zinfandel as the “official wine of California”. The bill was ultimately vetoed by Governor Arnold Schwarzenegger due to pressure from wineries that were producing wine from more well-known grapes, including Cabernet Sauvignon, Merlot and Chardonnay.

== ZAP scholarship funding ==
Zinfandel Advocates and Producers has partnered with different schools to sponsor scholarships and wine-related activities. In 2009, a scholarship was initiated at Sonoma State University for wine MBA students in memorial for Donn Reisen, who was a founder of ZAP and President of Ridge Vineyards.

Since 2005, ZAP has also sponsored scholarships and provided funding for the City College of San Francisco Culinary Arts wine program. The funding provided by ZAP is used for supporting and expanding the wine courses taught in the department.

== Organization ==
Zinfandel Advocates and Producers (ZAP) is a 501(c)(3) non-profit educational organization located in Grass Valley, CA with members across the US and in several other countries, including Italy and Mexico. ZAP is dedicated to advancing public knowledge of and appreciation for American Zinfandel and its unique place in American culture and history. Winegrowers, winemakers and wine enthusiasts combine to form the membership. The common focus is the preservation and recognition of Zinfandel as America’s heritage wine.
