= Consilience Wines =

Winery in Solvang, California, US

Consilience Winery
- Location: Solvang, California, United States
- Other labels: Tre Anelli (limited production)
- Founded: 1994
- First vintage: 1997
- Key people: Brett Escalera, Tom Daughters, Jodie Boulet-Daughters
- Varietals: Syrah, Grenache, Roussane, Viognier, Mourvedre, Grenache Blanc, Petite Sirah, Cabernet Sauvignon, Zinfandel, Sangiovese
- Distribution: National
- Tasting: Solvang wine tasting room
- Website: http://www.consiliencewines.com

Consilience Wines is a family-owned winery located in Solvang, California, and was established in 1994.

== Location and wines ==
Consilience Wines is based in Solvang in the Santa Ynez Valley, Santa Barbara County. The company specializes in Rhône, Syrah, Grenache, Roussanne, Viognier, Mourvèdre, Grenache Blanc and Petite Sirah. Other wines produced comprise Cabernet Sauvignon and the California grape, Zinfandel. The winery houses a second label, Tre Anelli, specializing in Italian and Spanish varieties, including Sangiovese, Tempranillo and Verdelho.

== History and operation ==
Consilience Wines was founded in 1994, when Brett Escalera and Tom Daughters joined together to create wines from Santa Barbara-county grapes in the Rhone Rangers tradition. In 2007 Escalera again teamed up with the Daughters brothers to launch Tre Anelli.

Escalera is an exponent of California-style wine and believes the terroir has created its distinct characteristics because more sunshine and milder weather enable riper fruit and longer hang time on the vine. He also experiments with wine varietals that might be unfamiliar in California, like Verdehlo, which is one of the most popular white grapes in Portugal (for white Port). It's also planted in Spain for dry white table wine.

The business model for Consilience Wines and Tre Anelli Wines depends heavily on wine clubs. Members have access to favorite and limited wines via agreed-upon pre-scheduled shipments, while giving the winery some security of wine sales. Tre Anelli has such small production that it is not distributed nationally, but sold through local restaurants, winery tastings and a wine club.
