= Ramona Valley AVA =

Appellation that designates wine in San Diego County, California

Coordinates: 33°03′48″N 116°49′09″W

Ramona Valley
- Wine region
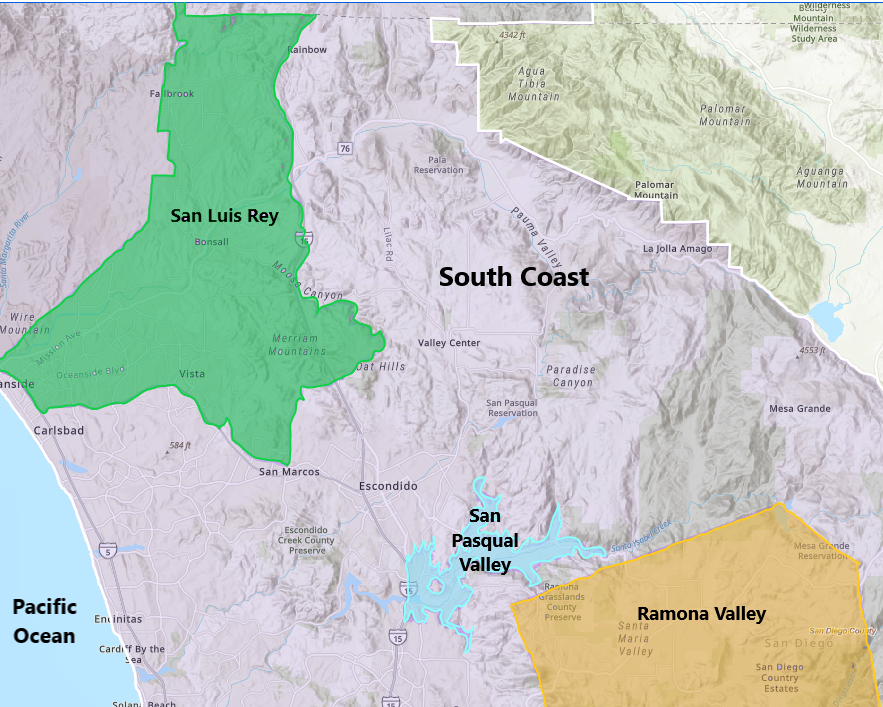
- Type: American Viticultural Area
- Year established: 2005
- Years of wine industry: 257
- Country: United States
- Part of: California, South Coast AVA, San Diego County
- Other regions in California, South Coast AVA, San Diego County: San Luis Rey AVA, San Pasqual Valley AVA
- Growing season: 320 days
- Climate region: Region III
- Heat units: 3,470 GDD units
- Precipitation (annual average): 16.5 in (419.1 mm)
- Soil conditions: Ramona, Visalia, Los Posas, and Fallbrook loams
- Total area: 89,000 acres (139 sq mi)
- Size of planted vineyards: 100 acres (40 ha)
- No. of vineyards: 80+
- Grapes produced: Albariño, Barbera, Cabernet Franc, Cabernet Sauvignon, Carignane, Chardonnay, Garnacha Blanca, Grenache, Malbec, Mataro, Merlot, Monastrell, Mouvedre, Muscat Canelli, Petit Verdot, Petite Sirah, Sangiovese, Sauvignon Blanc, Syrah, Shiraz, Tempranillo, Valdepenas, Viognier, Zinfandel
- No. of wineries: 36

Ramona Valley is an American Viticultural Area (AVA) in San Diego County, California, centered around the unincorporated town of Ramona. It was established as the nation's 168^{th}, the state's 95^{th} and the county's third appellation on December 7, 2005 by the Alcohol and Tobacco Tax and Trade Bureau (TTB), Treasury after reviewing the petition submitted by the Ramona Vineyard Association, currently the Ramona Valley Vineyard Association (RVVA), proposing a viticultural area in central San Diego County named "Ramona Valley."
The viticultural area surrounding Ramona is located 28 mi (45 km) northeast of San Diego and lies entirely within the vast 3,251,042 acres (5,080 sq mi) multi-county South Coast AVA. It also is south of the two previously established viticultural areas within South Coast, Temecula Valley and San Pasqual Valley. The AVA encircles approximately 89,000 acres (139 sq mi) in a 14.5 by 9.5 miles (23.3 by 15.3 km) west-southwest to east-northeast oriented rectangular area. Ramona Valley is geographically a broad, flat valley surrounded by hills and mountains that isolates it from adjacent areas. The valley has an average vineyard elevation of 1,400 feet (430 m) and an annual average rainfall of 16.5 inches (419.1 mm). In 2005, the area had approximately 17 vineyards cultivating an estimated 45 acres (18 ha) of wine grapes. The petitioners noted the area is known for its distinctive microclimate, elevation, and soil attributes.

== History ==
Ramona Valley had many agricultural incarnations over the past century, from the "Turkey Capital of the World", dairies, and chicken egg production, to avocados and citrus farms, and currently into a rapidly growing wine grape region. Its viticulture history began with the arrival of Spanish missionaries, led by Junipero Serra, in 1769. American viticulture started as early as 1889, with wine grapes grown at Rancho Bernardo for use at the Bernardo Winery. In modern times, Ross Rizzo, the master vintner at Bernardo Winery, recalls that up to a thousand acres of wine grapes were growing in Ramona Valley during the 1940s and 1950s. The Schwaesdall Winery, which opened in 1993, uses grape vines planted in the Ramona Valley in the 1950s as well as their own plantings begun in 1989.

== Terroir ==
=== Topography ===
The distinguishing factors of the Ramona Valley viticultural area include its elevation, which contrasts with the surrounding areas, and climatic factors related to its elevation and inland location. Ramona Valley was the third viticultural area to be designated in the large multi-county South Coast AVA, after San Pasqual Valley in 1981 and Temecula Valley in 1984. In a 2006 interview on National Public Radio, Bill Schweitzer of the Ramona Valley Vineyard Association described the area's exceptional viticultural characteristics as being partially derived from its unique location of being 25 miles (40 km) east of the Pacific Ocean and 25 miles (40 km) west of the Colorado Desert.

Ramona Valley viticultural area is encircled by a ring of hills and mountains that isolate it from the surrounding regions of San Diego County. Santa Maria Creek flows west through the viticultural area before passing through a narrow gap in the hills near the northwestern corner of the area. The lowest elevation of the Ramona Valley viticultural area, 650 ft (200 m), is at the southwest corner of the area at the San Vicente Reservoir. Elevations within the northern, southern, and western portions of the viticultural area vary between 650 and 1,600 feet (200 and 490 m), with an average base elevation of about 1,400 feet (430 m). The eastern terrain of the area rises more than 3,000 feet (910 m) at the foothills of the Cuyamaca Mountains. The highest elevation suitable for viticulture here is 2,640 feet (800 m). Beyond the Ramona Valley viticultural area boundary lines to the south, west, and north are lower coastal valleys with elevations at 500 feet (150 m) or less. While higher in elevation than these coastal valleys, Ramona Valley AVA is significantly lower than the Cuyamaca Mountain Range to the east, which has peaks reaching 6,200 feet (1,900 m).

=== Climate ===
The Ramona Valley viticultural area has a distinguishable microclimate as compared to the surrounding regions. With the Anza-Borrego Desert 25 mi (40 km) to the east and the Pacific Ocean about 25 mi (40 km) to the west, the desert and ocean influences affect and moderate the Ramona Valley climate during the growing season. Also known locally as "the Valley of the Sun," due to its lack of cool coastal morning fog, Ramona Valley viticultural area is warmer than the lower elevation coastal areas and valleys to its south, west, and north. The area is cooler in the summer, but warmer in the winter, than the higher Cuyamaca Mountains to its east. A comparison of daily temperature variations among the towns of Ramona, Poway, Escondido, and Julian indicates that Ramona has greater daily temperature fluctuations than the surrounding areas. The viticultural area enjoys up to 320 frost-free days and has a heat summation of 3,470 degree-days annually. During the growing season, one degree day accumulates for each degree Fahrenheit that a day's mean temperature is above 50 degrees, which is the minimum temperature required for grapevine growth. The Ramona Valley viticultural area receives an average annual rainfall of 16.5 inches. This rainfall total is more than that of the lower coastal valleys, but less than the 31 in (790 mm) average received at Julian in the higher mountains to the east of the Ramona Valley area. The USDA plant hardiness zones range from 9a to 10a.

=== Soils ===
Ramona Valley viticultural area has a variety of soil types due to its differing landforms, slopes, and geology. The mountains surrounding the area consist of igneous rock. Also, the mid-slopes to the east and west of the Ramona Valley floor have the reddish coloration of San Marcos Gabbro, a mafic rock type. Mafic rock formations are known to generate nutrient-rich soil, which is ideal for agriculture. Soil series of the Ramona Valley viticultural area include Ramona, Visalia, Los Posas, and Fallbrook loams. The Ramona soil series, as documented in the 1973 U.S. Soil Conservation Service Soil Survey for San Diego County, consists of well-drained, very deep sandy loams with sandy clay loam subsoil. This series is found between the 200 and 1,800 feet (61 and 549 m) elevations on terraces and alluvial fans.

== Viticulture ==
Ramona Valley is often called "The Heart of San Diego's Wine Country." Currently, the AVA is home to more than 80 commercial vineyards with over 100 acres (40 ha) of varieties of both white and red grapes in cultivation. As of 2025, there were over 36 bonded wineries operating in the AVA where the Ramona Valley Winery Association labors to establish its identity, discovers its strengths, refining them and building the brand. The area's vineyards and wineries are mostly small boutique, family-owned and operated ventures that adds a personal touch and individualism to the viticulture business resulting in a variety of excellent and award-winning vintages. Yet, Ramona Valley's growing popularity has caught the attention of big wineries building expectations of a future explosion of business and visitors to follow affecting the region for generations to come.

== See also ==
- California wine
