= College of Agricultural and Environmental Sciences =

College of Agricultural and Environmental Sciences may refer to:

- UC Davis College of Agricultural and Environmental Sciences
- University of Georgia College of Agricultural and Environmental Sciences

== See also ==
- College of Agricultural, Consumer and Environmental Sciences at the University of Illinois Urbana-Champaign
