= Winkler =

Winkler may refer to:

- Winkler (surname), people with the surname Winkler or Winckler
- Winkler scale, also known as the heat summation scale for classifying climates
- Winkler (crater), a crater on the Moon
- 6473 Winkler, an asteroid
- Winkler method, a test to determine dissolved oxygen concentration in water
- Winkler vine, an example of large-vine grape culture
- Winkler (novel), by Giles Coren
- Winkler + Dünnebier, German machine building company

== Places ==
- Winkler, Manitoba, a Canadian city
- Winkler, Kansas, an unincorporated community
- Winkler, Missouri, an unincorporated community
- Winkler County, Texas, a county in the state of Texas
