= San Luis Rey AVA =

Appellation that designates wine in San Diego County, California

Coordinates: 33°21′05″N 117°12′05″W

San Luis Rey
- Wine region
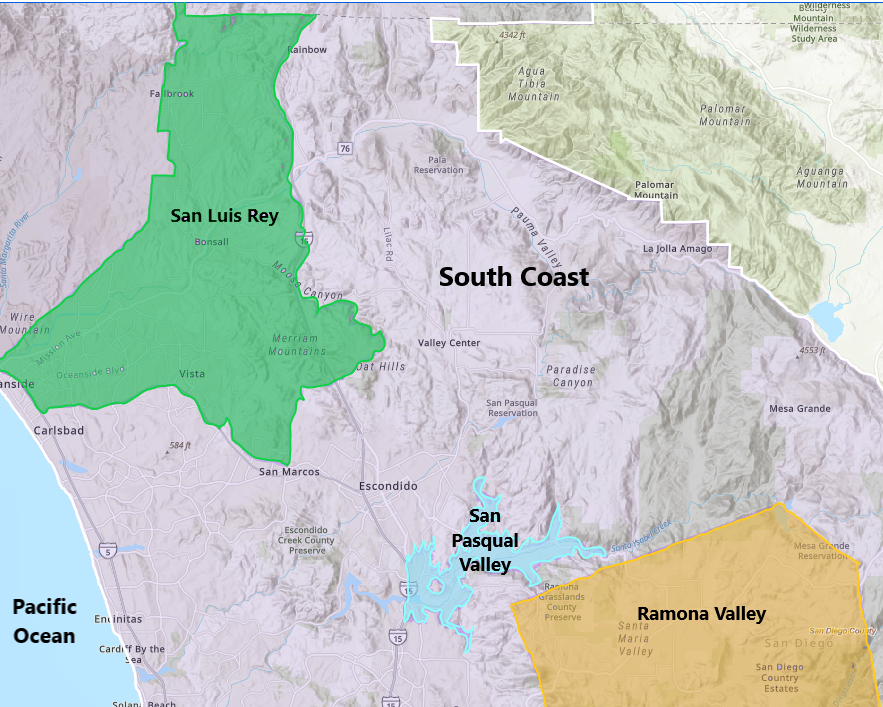
- Type: American Viticultural Area
- Year established: 2024
- Years of wine industry: 228
- Country: United States
- Part of: California, South Coast AVA, San Diego County
- Other regions in California, South Coast AVA, San Diego County: Ramona Valley AVA, San Pasqual Valley AVA
- Climate region: Region I-V
- Heat units: 3849 GDD
- Precipitation (annual average): 14.27 in (362.46 mm)
- Soil conditions: Alfisols series, gravelly and fine sandy loam derived from granitic rock
- Total area: 97,733 acres (153 sq mi)
- Size of planted vineyards: 256 acres (104 ha)
- No. of vineyards: 44
- Grapes produced: Albariño, Cabernet Franc, Cabernet Sauvignon, Chardonnay, Grenache, Malbec, Merlot, Sangiovese, Syrah, Tempranillo
- No. of wineries: 23

San Luis Rey is an American Viticultural Area (AVA) located in San Diego County, California, within the vast 3.25-million-acre (5,078 sq mi) multi-county South Coast AVA. It extends from the coastal town of Oceanside inland to the Merriam Mountains and Moosa Canyon. It was established as the nation's 274^{th}, the state's 153^{rd} and the county's fourth wine appellation on August 30, 2024 by the Alcohol and Tobacco Tax and Trade Bureau (TTB), Treasury after reviewing the petition submitted by Rebecca Wood, managing member of Premium Vintners LLC, on behalf of Fallbrook Winery and other local vineyard owners and winemakers proposing the viticultural area named "San Luis Rey."
There are 44 commercially producing vineyards cultivating approximately 256 acres (104 ha), along with 29 acres (12 ha) of planned vineyards and 23 wineries within the AVA. According to the petition, the distinguishing features of San Luis Rey AVA are its topography, climate and soils.

== History ==
The "San Luis Rey" (/sæn ˈluːɪs reɪ/ san-lu-is-rey) name is regional derived after its landmark Mission San Luis Rey de Francia, established by Franciscan monks in 1798 honoring Saint Louis IX, King of France. The hilltop mission overlooks the valley of the San Luis Rey River watershed that geologically defines the area that shares the name. The petition also notes the name "San Luis Rey" is appropriate for the AVA since the mission community established the tradition of wine grape growing in this area based on the Mission grape. Evidence of the early viticulture in this area is supported by comments made by Auguste Duhaut-Cilly, a French explorer, who appreciated the wine made at the Mission San Luis Rey de Francia. In the 1929 document, Duhaut-Cilly's Account of California in the Years, 1827–28 describes the Mission's gardens, "These gardens produce the best olives and the best wine in all California."

== Terroir ==
=== Topography ===
The distinguishing features of San Luis Rey AVA are its topography, climate, and soils. The viticultural area is part of the Peninsular Ranges, stretching south from Riverside County to Baja California. Its boundaries run from the San Diego-Riverside County border south to the towns of Oceanside and San Marcos. It has low elevations that allow cool marine air from the Pacific Ocean to flow through the region, moderating temperatures. The mean elevation within the AVA is 563 ft (172 m), and the average slope angle is 10 degrees. The low elevations and a terrain of gently rolling hills that are open to marine air almost eliminate the spring frosts that can affect vine growth at the beginning of the growing season. The petition also notes that afternoon breezes help to prevent fungal diseases resulting from the morning's low cloud cover. In the region north of the San Luis Rey AVA, elevations are higher and slope angles are similar to those in the AVA. In the region to the south, average elevations are lower and slope angles are shallower than within the AVA. Also, in the area to the southeast, elevations are higher with steeper slope angles than the AVA. The petition did not provide elevation ranges for the area east of the AVA but did include a graphic indicating higher elevations to the east of the AVA. The Pacific Ocean is west of the AVA, so the petition did not provide distinguishing feature information for this area. TTB has also determined that the San Luis Rey AVA will remain part of the established South Coast AVA. The AVA shares the marine-influenced climate of the larger South Coast AVA. However, in general, the San Luis Rey AVA has a lower mean elevation and more consistent terrain than the South Coast AVA.

=== Climate ===
The topography of the San Luis Rey valley which effects the area's climate. The petition provided climate data, specifically the average annual mean temperature, average annual maximum temperature, average peak ripening and harvest season maximum temperature, and growing degree day (GDD) accumulations for the AVA and surrounding regions. According to the petition, the AVA generally has mild winters and summers with lower maximum temperatures than regions farther inland due to the AVA's proximity to the Pacific Ocean. The petition notes that the AVA has lower average annual mean and maximum temperatures and fewer GDDs than the regions to the north and south. The AVA has a greater number of mean GDDs but lower minimum GDDs and a lower average annual maximum temperature than the area to the southeast. Additionally, San Luis Rey AVA has lower annual precipitation amounts than the regions to the north and southeast and slightly higher amounts than the region to the south.

The rainy season in the San Luis Rey AVA and surrounding area is from November to April. From May to October rain is rare and apart from the morning fog typical for May and June the humidity is generally low. Average yearly rainfall in San Luis Rey AVA increases from under 12 inches (300 mm) in the coastal area to around 17 inches (430 mm) at the northwestern border. San Luis Rey AVA is in average drier than South Coast (1.29 in (32.77 mm) lower precipitation), Temecula Valley (3.07 in (77.98 mm) lower precipitation) and Ramona Valley AVAs (3.06 in (77.72 mm) lower precipitation). The viticultural area benefits from low risk of rain during spring and grape ripening season which can cause bloom disruption, split berries and ripening disruption.

Winds in the San Luis Rey AVA are generally mild, most of the time less than 10 miles per hour (16 km/h); in the Fallbrook area less than 15 mph (24 km/h). During summer afternoons the area typically experiences persistent westerly winds from the coast which prevent the temperatures to rise as high as in nearby AVAs. These winds also help prohibit fungal diseases such as powdery mildew. Strong winds occur occasionally and are usually associated with migrant storms in winter. In fall and winter the area occasionally experiences strong, gusty flows of air from north or east, usually dry and warm.

=== Soil ===
The three most common soil series make up 34.9 percent of the total in the AVA, but only comprise 20.3 percent of the total South Coast AVA soils. Nearly 50 percent of the soils in the San Luis Rey AVA are Alfisols soils with high concentrations of essential plant nutrients. Soils in this order have relatively high native fertility and high concentrations of calcium, magnesium, potassium, and sodium, which are essential plant nutrients. The soils of the AVA are also relatively low in organic carbon. The petition states that soils with low levels of organic carbon decrease grapevine vigor, leading to smaller canopies, clusters and berries. The smaller clusters and berries enhance the flavor concentration in the grapes and increase the skin-to-juice ratio during fermentation, while fewer leaves on the vines lead to improved fruit color and a reduction in "green" flavors. Approximately 69 percent of the soils in the AVA are sandy loams as an even mixture of soil separates that can hold water while draining and aerating well and prevent overly vigorous growth, and is easily worked with agricultural tools. Sandy loams also have low cation exchange capacity, which reduces the ability of vines to absorb nutrients from the soil and prevents overly vigorous growth. The main soil series within the AVA are the Las Posas, Fallbrook, and Cieneba series, and the primary parent materials of these soils are 28.85 percent granite and 19.54 percent granodiorite. Soils to the north are 48 percent Alfisols and also contain more Entisols and Mollisols soils than the AVA. To the south, soils are primarily Alfisols but in lower amounts than the AVA. This area also has more Entisols and Mollisols soils than the AVA. To the southeast, soils are 46 percent Alfisols, but contain more Entisols than are found in the AVA.

== Viticulture ==
Commercial viticulture has been active in the region since the mid-1990s, and winery owner, Rebecca Wood of Fallbrook Winery, submitted the 2021 petition to the TTB proposing to establish San Luis Rey AVA. Its 44 vineyards and 23 wineries produce mainly Cabernet Sauvignon, Merlot, Cabernet Franc, Syrah, and Grenache. Euan Parker, the winemaker for Fallbrook Winery, one of the region's oldest brands, says the flavor of Cabernet Sauvignon bears more similarity to wines coming from Sonoma than Napa. "They're not as jammy as Napa Cabs can sometimes be," he says. The Merlots tend to be the bolder and more powerful wines, and the Cabernet Francs "are more in the line of Saint-Nicolas de Bourgueil in terms of taste."
