= South Coast AVA =

American Viticultural Area in California

Coordinates: 33°22′43″N 117°12′16″W

South Coast
- Wine region
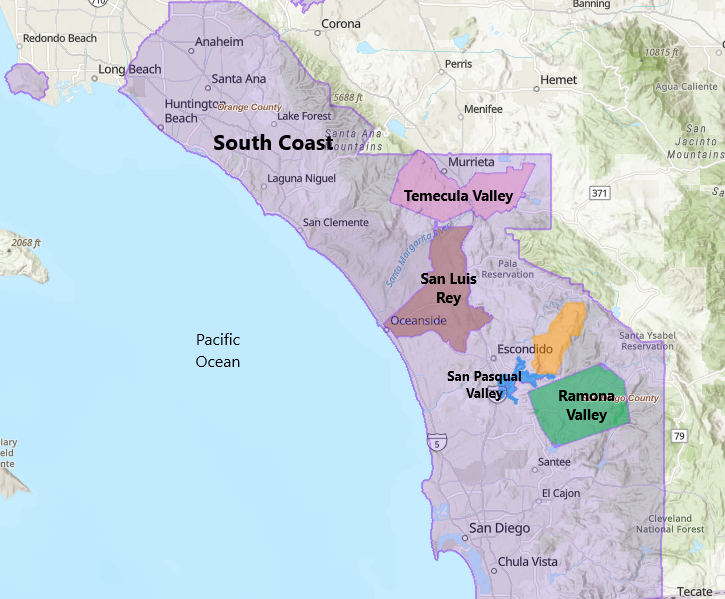
- Type: American Viticultural Area
- Year established: 1985
- Country: United States
- Part of: California
- Other regions in California: North Coast AVA, Central Coast AVA
- Sub-regions: Ramona Valley AVA, San Luis Rey AVA, San Pasqual Valley AVA, Temecula Valley AVA
- Growing season: 302 days
- Climate region: Region I-V
- Total area: 1.2 million acres (1,800 sq mi)
- Size of planted vineyards: 3,000 acres (1,200 ha)
- Grapes produced: Cabernet Franc, Cabernet Sauvignon, Chardonnay, Lenoir, Merlot, Montepulciano, Muscat Canelli, Petit Verdot, Petite Sirah, Pinot gris, Riesling, Sangiovese, Sauvignon blanc, Symphony, Syrah, Tempranillo, Trebbiano, Viognier, Zinfandel
- No. of wineries: 108

South Coast is an American Viticultural Area (AVA) located in Southern California that encompasses five counties: Los Angeles, Orange, Riverside, San Bernardino, and San Diego. It was established as the nation's 82nd and the state's 47th appellation on November 21, 1985 by the Bureau of Alcohol, Tobacco and Firearms (ATF), Treasury after reviewing the petition submitted by the South Coast Vintners Association on behalf of grape growers and wineries in the region proposing a viticultural area to be known as "South Coast."

The area encompasses about 1.2 million acres (1,800 sq mi) and expands along the Pacific coastline between Los Angeles (L.A.) and the Mexican border with about 3,000 acres (1,200 ha) under vine and 15 wineries at the outset. As of 2025, at least 108 wineries were operating within the area. South Coast encompasses a number of smaller sub-appellations that all share the common ecology trait of having warm weather moderated by cooling coastal influences from the Pacific Ocean. In 2024, the Alcohol and Tobacco Tax and Trade Bureau (TTB) proposed to establish the 32,360-acre (51 sq mi) "Rancho Guejito" viticultural area in San Diego County. The proposed AVA is located entirely within South Coast AVA and would partially overlap the existing San Pasqual Valley AVA.

== Terroir ==
The "South Coast" viticultural area is distinguished geographically from the surrounding areas as follows:

- To the north, the area is set off by the predominant urbanization of Los Angeles County, which makes grape-growing there unfeasible. The petition explained this as follows: "No doubt portions of Los Angeles County would qualify, with respect to name, as "South Coast." However, as a practical matter the entire Los Angeles County coastal area is urbanized and no present or potential grape growing areas exist. Since no grapes come from Los Angeles County and it is very unlikely that any ever will, it was considered confusing to include the L.A. County in "South Coast."
- To the west, the area is bounded by the Pacific Ocean.
- The southern boundary of the area, "the Mexican-American border, does not correspond to a geographical distinction. However, since 27 CFR Part 9 is titled "American Viticultural Areas," and since "American" is defined in 27 CFR 9.11 as "Of or relating to the several States, the District of Columbia, and Puerto Rico," it is evident that an American viticultural area must not extend into Mexico.
- To the east, the proposed area is distinguished geographically by the limit of "coastal influence." This distinction was described in the petition as follows: "Applicant believes that 'coast' infers some substantial coastal influence on the grape growing areas involved, resulting in classification of same as Zone I through III of the Davis scale.

The premium wine districts of California fall in Regions I,II, and III, while Regions IV and V produce mostly table grapes or the bulk and dessert-fortified-wines. While many grapes are grown in San Bernardino, eastern Riverside, eastern San Diego and Imperial Counties, they are grown in Zones IV or V, and are primarily table grapes rather than wine grapes." The plant hardiness zone ranges from 8a to 11a.
