= Randall Grahm =

American winemaker (born 1953)

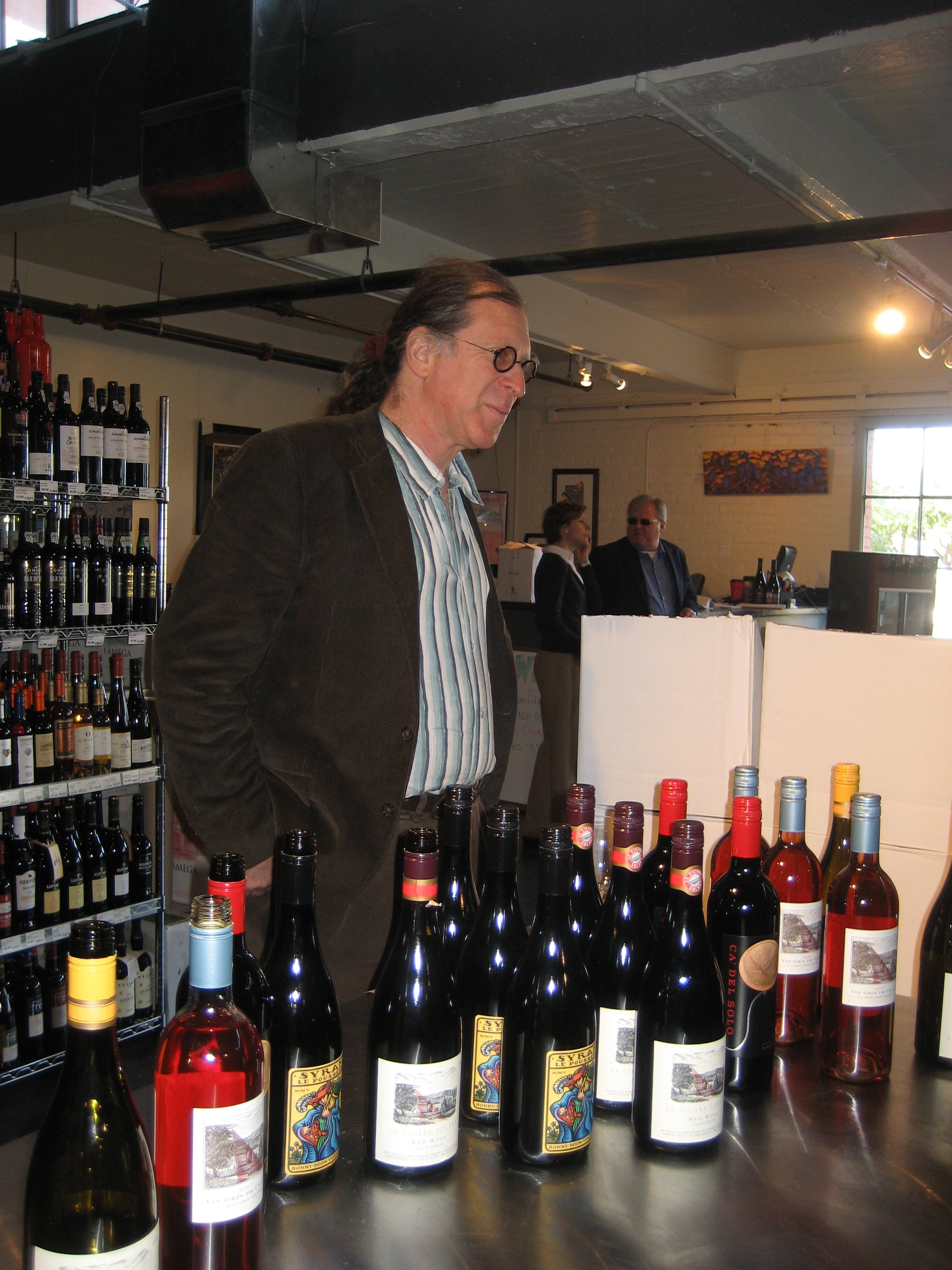
- Randall Grahm at a wine tasting in New Orleans, 2008
- Born: April 4, 1953 (age 73); Los Angeles, California, U.S.
- Occupation: Winemaker
- Known for: Bonny Doon Vineyard

Randall Grahm is a California winemaker and the founder of Bonny Doon Vineyard. He is perhaps best known for his pioneering work with Rhone varieties in California and for popularizing the use of screw caps on premium wines. He was an early proponent of transparent ingredient labeling on bottled wines, and has been a prominent advocate of terroir wines and biodynamic practice.

== Biography ==
Randall Grahm was born in Los Angeles in 1953 and attended UC Santa Cruz where he was "a permanent Liberal Arts major." He eventually began working at the Wine Merchant in Beverly Hills sweeping floors. There he had the opportunity to taste great French wines and the experience turned him into "a complete and insufferable wine fanatic." He returned to the University of California, Davis to complete a degree in Plant Sciences in 1979, where he developed a "single-minded obsession with Pinot Noir".

With his family's assistance, Grahm purchased property in Bonny Doon, in the Santa Cruz Mountains, where he was intent on producing "The Great American Pinot Noir." Although he initially had trouble with Pinot, he was encouraged by experimental batches of Rhône varieties, and he has been a tireless champion of Rhône grapes since the inaugural vintage of Le Cigare Volant in 1986. In 1989 Grahm appeared on the cover of the Wine Spectator, clad in blue polyester, as "The Rhône Ranger," a moniker that has followed him ever since.

In 1991 Grahm was added to the Who's Who of Cooking in America by Cook's Illustrated magazine, and in the same year Ted Bowell of the Lowell Observatory in northern Arizona named the "4934 Rhôneranger" asteroid in his honor. He was proclaimed Wine and Spirits Professional of the Year by the James Beard Foundation in 1994.

Grahm lectures frequently to wine societies and technical groups, and occasionally contributes "quixotically sincere" articles to wine journals. His newsletters and articles were collected and published in 2009 as the award-winning book Been Doon So Long: A Randall Grahm Vinthology. In 2010 The Culinary Institute of America inducted him into the Vintner's Hall of Fame. He currently lives in Santa Cruz with his partner Chinshu and their daughter, Amélie.

Grahm's current commercial wine endeavour is with a winery called The Language of Yes, with vineyards based in Santa Maria.

== In The Media ==
A documentary film about Grahm, directed by Jeffrey Reiner, is scheduled for release in 2026. The film, The Terroirist, explores Grahm's quixotic attempt to cultivate the first truly American wine grape before his health issues catch up to him.
