= Winkler vine =

Example of large-vine grape culture

The Winkler Vine was an example of large-vine grape culture. The vine was named after Albert J. Winkler, Chair of the Department of Viticulture and Enology (1935–1957) at University of California, Davis. Planted in 1979, the Winkler vine was a Vitis vinifera cv. Mission, grafted on to a Vitis rupestris St George rootstock. A great deal of research has been carried out on pruning, training and vine size; by researchers such as: Ravaz, Winkler, Shaulis, Koblet, Howell, Carbonneau, Smart & Clingeleffer. Minimal pruning is a pruning/training system adapted from the principles of big-vine theory.

== History ==
The Mission grape cultivar was originally brought to South America from Spain by Catholic missionaries and was introduced into California in the 18th century. Historically Mission was the most widely planted cultivar in California, up to the 1850s.

The Winkler Vine was trained on a 60x60ft steel arbour, covering 1/12 of an acre and was capable of producing over a tonne of fruit. The Winkler vine was damaged by a tractor 'early in its life' and carried a large canker; eventually the vine became infected with the wood rot, Eutypa, causing its death in spring 2008.

== Big vine viticulture ==
The vine was the classic example of big vine culture, where vines are trained and pruned to allow the plant to express its natural vigour; rather than forcing a vine into a restricted trellis system by heavy pruning. Eventually a 'big-vine' will reach its maximum size and yield compensation will result in 'balanced' cropping. Big vine production of grapes is not economically feasible due to the time taken to establish the plant. It does, however, demonstrate the natural ability of a vine to produce fruit in a sustainable manner (yield vs. fruit ripeness vs. carbohydrate storage).
