= San Pasqual Valley AVA =

Wine region in San Diego County, California

Coordinates: 33°04′17″N 117°02′37″W

San Pasqual Valley
- Wine region
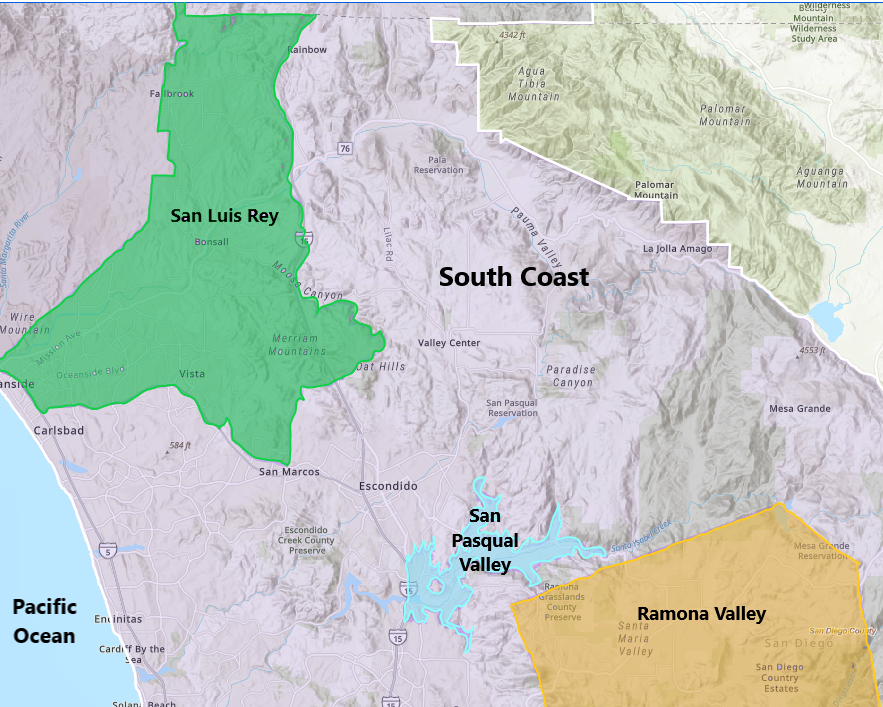
- Type: American Viticultural Area
- Year established: 1981
- Country: United States
- Part of: California, South Coast AVA, San Diego County
- Other regions in California, South Coast AVA, San Diego County: Ramona Valley AVA, San Luis Rey AVA
- Growing season: 342 days
- Climate region: Region IV
- Heat units: 4,122 GDD units
- Precipitation (annual average): 13.69 inches (348 mm)
- Soil conditions: Alluvial fill on a decomposed granite base
- Total area: 9,000 acres (14 sq mi)
- Size of planted vineyards: 100 acres (40 ha)
- No. of vineyards: 16
- Grapes produced: Grenache, Merlot, Sangiovese, Syrah, Tempranillo, Viognier
- No. of wineries: 4

San Pasqual Valley (Spanish pronunciation: [/ˈsam pasˈkal/] san-pas-KWAL) is an American Viticultural Area (AVA) located in northern San Diego County, California within the thin San Pasqual Valley landform of the Peninsular Ranges which runs inland from the city of Escondido north of the city of San Diego. The 9,000-acre (14 sq mi) region was established as the nation's fifth, the state's third and the county's initial appellation on August 17, 1981 by the Bureau of Alcohol, Tobacco and Firearms (ATF), Treasury after reviewing the petition submitted by Charles W. Froehlich, Jr. of San Pasqual Vineyards proposing a viticultural area in San Diego County named "San Pasqual Valley."

== History ==
The region's name is documented since the early 18th century. In December of 1846, the area was the scene of a battle between Californios led by Major Andrés Pico and U.S. Army of the West troops under General Stephen Watts Kearny. This battle is known as the "Battle of San Pasqual." A monument is present denoting the battle and name. Viticulture history in San Pasqual Valley dates back to the 18th century, when Spanish missionaries introduced grape cultivation to the region as part of California's mission system. A 1887 published book, "Picturesque San Diego", specifically mentioned San Pasqual Valley and the several extensive vineyards present-at that time. By the early 20th century, vineyards flourished in San Diego County, but Prohibition (1920–1933) nearly wiped out the industry.

The San Pasqual Valley has been farmed for more than one hundred years. Historically, the agricultural uses of the land have been the production of deciduous tree crops, vine crops and the operation of Grade A dairies. The pioneer homesteads in the valley all had family orchards of deciduous and citrus trees and grape vineyards. Currently the east end of the valley is planted to oranges, lemons and avocados. The central and west end supports fine vineyards, irrigated row crops and three Grade A dairies. This area is very well adapted to the successful production of these particular crops. High yields over the years testify to the areas adaptation to their production.

San Pasqual Valley experienced a winemaking resurgence in the latter half of the 20th century. In 1981, the ATF designated San Pasqual Valley AVA as California's third oldest appellation. Today, the region is home to several boutique wineries and has been recognized for its quality small-batch wine production.

== Terroir ==
=== Topography ===
San Pasqual Valley is a natural, sheltered valley located about 10 to 15 miles (16–24 km) inland from the Pacific Ocean in the Santa Ysabel watershed, south of Escondido and north of the City of San Diego. The valley is surrounded on three sides by low mountain ranges rising to 1,500 feet (457 m) above sea level; the valley is fed by natural streams, culminating in the San Dieguito River which empties into Lake Hodges on the west (fourth) side. The elevation of the valley floor varies from 300 to 350 feet (91–107 m) above sea level, while the sides of the alluvial plain rise to approximately 500 feet (152 m) above sea level.

=== Climate ===
The climatic conditions of the area are basically uniform with a strong coastal influence. Summer temperatures are warm, rarely above 95 °F (35 °C), with cool nights, uniformly below 65 °F (18 °C), resulting from a prevailing ocean breeze. Any haze is burned off by the sun, however, due to its low elevation, freezes are fairly common in winter. The AVA belongs to Region IV on the Winkler scale. The climate in this appellation is desert-like but tempered by cool breezes from the Pacific Ocean, with long growing seasons (average temperatures above 50 °F (10 °C) year-round), warm winters with nighttime lows rarely dipping below 35 °F (2 °C), and summers with daily highs rarely exceeding 95 °F (35 °C). With cooler evenings and granite-based soils that drain well, grapes from this area are able to retain their colors and balanced acidity. The USDA plant hardiness zone is 9b to 10a.

=== Soils ===
The soil structure of the valley floor is alluvial fill, while the slopes are of a decomposed granite base. Water for irrigation, stock water and for domestic use is derived from wells and is adequate for these purposes.

== Viiculture ==
San Pasqual Valley is planted with a wide range of Vitis vinifera with Grenache, Merlot, Sangiovese, Syrah, Tempranillo and Viognier being some of the most widely planted. The terrain is varied and rocky with many microclimates with elevations ranging from 500 to 1,500 feet (152–457 m). San Pasqual Valley is home to over 16 commercial vineyards, many of which specialize in small-batch, handcrafted wines. Some of the most notable wineries include:

- Altipiano Vineyard and Winery
- Cordiano Winery — A family-run winery offering Italian varietals such as Sangiovese and Montepulciano, along with a scenic tasting patio.
- Domain Artefact Vineyard & Winery
- Espinosa Vineyards and Winery
- Forgotten Barrel Winery
- Highland Valley Vineyards
- Hungry Hawk Vineyard — Estate-grown wines with a variety of grapes, including Cabernet Sauvignon and Grenache.
- Matthews Organic Orchards
- Mia Marie Vineyard
- Orfila Winery — One of the largest and most recognized wineries in San Pasqual Valley, known for Rhone-style wines, including Syrah and Viognier.
- Rancho Guijito Vineyard — Part of the historic Rancho Guejito, a 22,000-acre (34 sq mi) land grant dating back to 1845. The ranch has developed vineyards with estate-grown wines while preserving its historic significance.
- San Pasqual Winery
- Sky High Vineyards
- Speckle Rock Vineyards
- Wicked Snakes Winery
- ZXQ Vineyards and Winery

== Grape Day Festival ==
San Pasqual Valley hosts Grape Day Festival, an annual event that celebrates the harvest season and highlights the region's wine culture. Established in 1908, the festival takes place in Grape Day Park in nearby Escondido, California, featuring wine tastings, educational exhibits, and live entertainment.

== See also ==
- California wine
- South Coast AVA
- Ramona Valley AVA
- San Luis Rey AVA
