= Bonny Doon Vineyard =

Winery in California, United States

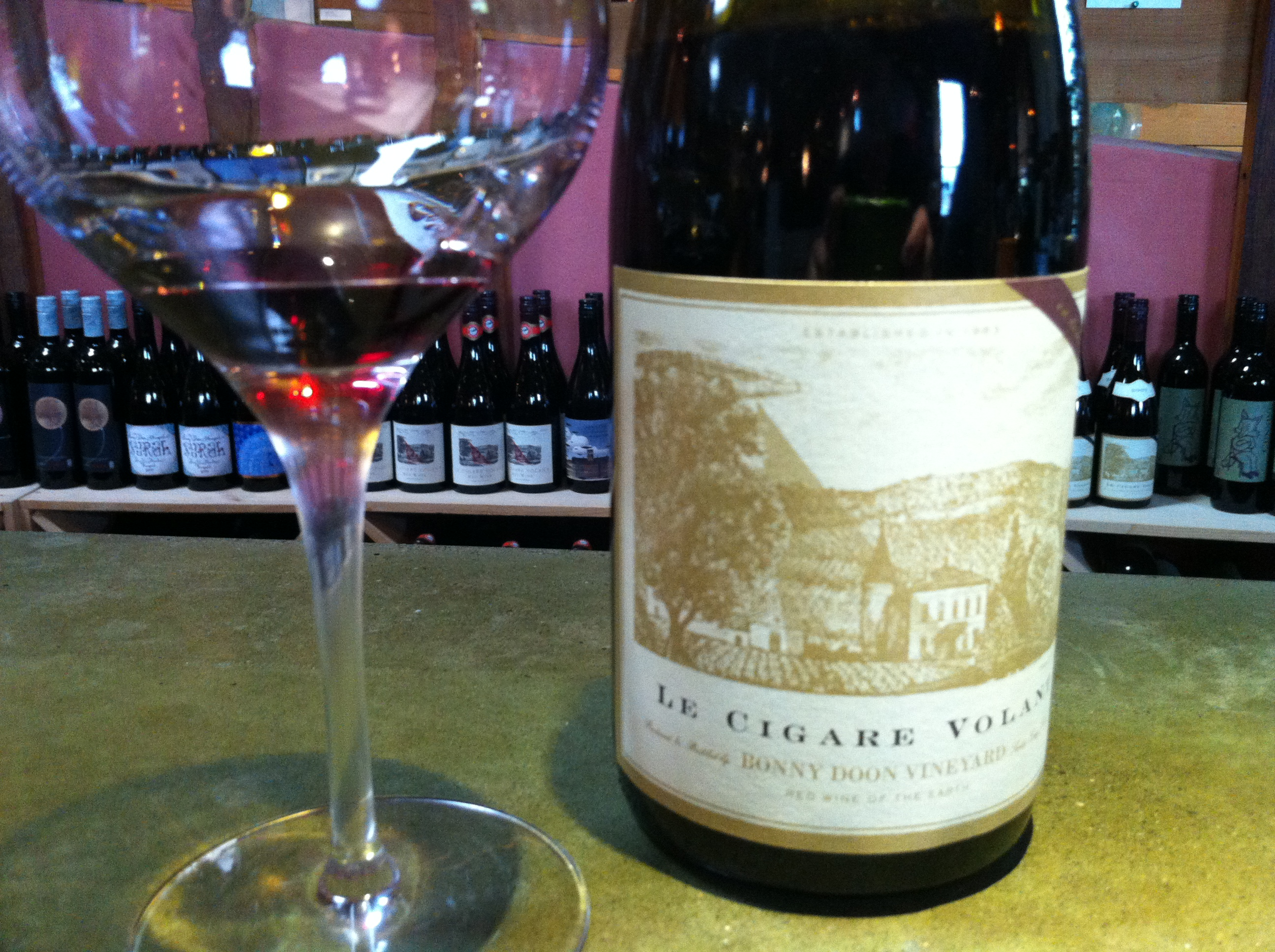
- Le Cigare Volant (The Flying Cigar)
- Location: Santa Cruz County, California, USA
- Appellation: Central Coast AVA
- Other labels: Big House Red; Cardinal Zin
- Founded: 1983
- Key people: Randall Grahm, Winemaker
- Known for: Le Cigare Volant
- Varietal: Rhône
- Website: Bonny Doon Vineyard

Bonny Doon Vineyard is a winery in the Santa Cruz locale, that focuses on terroir wines. Founded by Randall Grahm in 1983, it is perhaps best known for its quirky labels, eccentric mix of grapes, and humorously named wines—like its flagship wine, "Le Cigare Volant". It was amongst the first Californian wineries to embrace Rhone varietals, and entered the national spotlight in 1989, after Grahm appeared on the cover of Wine Spectator as "The Rhone Ranger."

The winery achieved large-scale commercial success with brands like Big House Red and Cardinal Zin, before "doon-sizing" its portfolio in 2006 to refocus its efforts on terroir wines and biodynamic practice. Bonny Doon Vineyard continues to be known for its unique label artwork, sourcing designs from artists like Chuck House, Grady McFerrin, Ralph Steadman and Gary Taxali. It was among the first premium winemakers to adopt screw caps for its wines in 2001, and in 2008 pioneered the use of transparent ingredient labeling on all of its wines.

== History ==
According to Randall Grahm, Bonny Doon Vineyard began as "a foolish attempt to replicate Burgundy in California," but after difficulty creating the "Great American Pinot Noir," he realized that Rhône wine varieties would be better suited to the Central Coast climate than Pinot Noir grapes. Grahm began experimenting with Rhone grapes and blended wines, and in 1986, Bonny Doon Vineyard released its inaugural vintage (1984) of Le Cigare Volant, an homage to Châteauneuf-du-Pape, a wine that would become the winery's flagship label.

After the vines in its own vineyard were destroyed by Pierce's disease in 1994, Bonny Doon supported its wine production by purchasing grapes from other California vineyards, as well as vineyards in Oregon (including Bethel Heights Vineyard) and Europe. The winery grew significantly in this period with its popular Cardinal Zin, Big House and Pacific Rim labels, reaching peak production in 2006, after selling more than 450,000 cases of wine.

== Reorganization ==
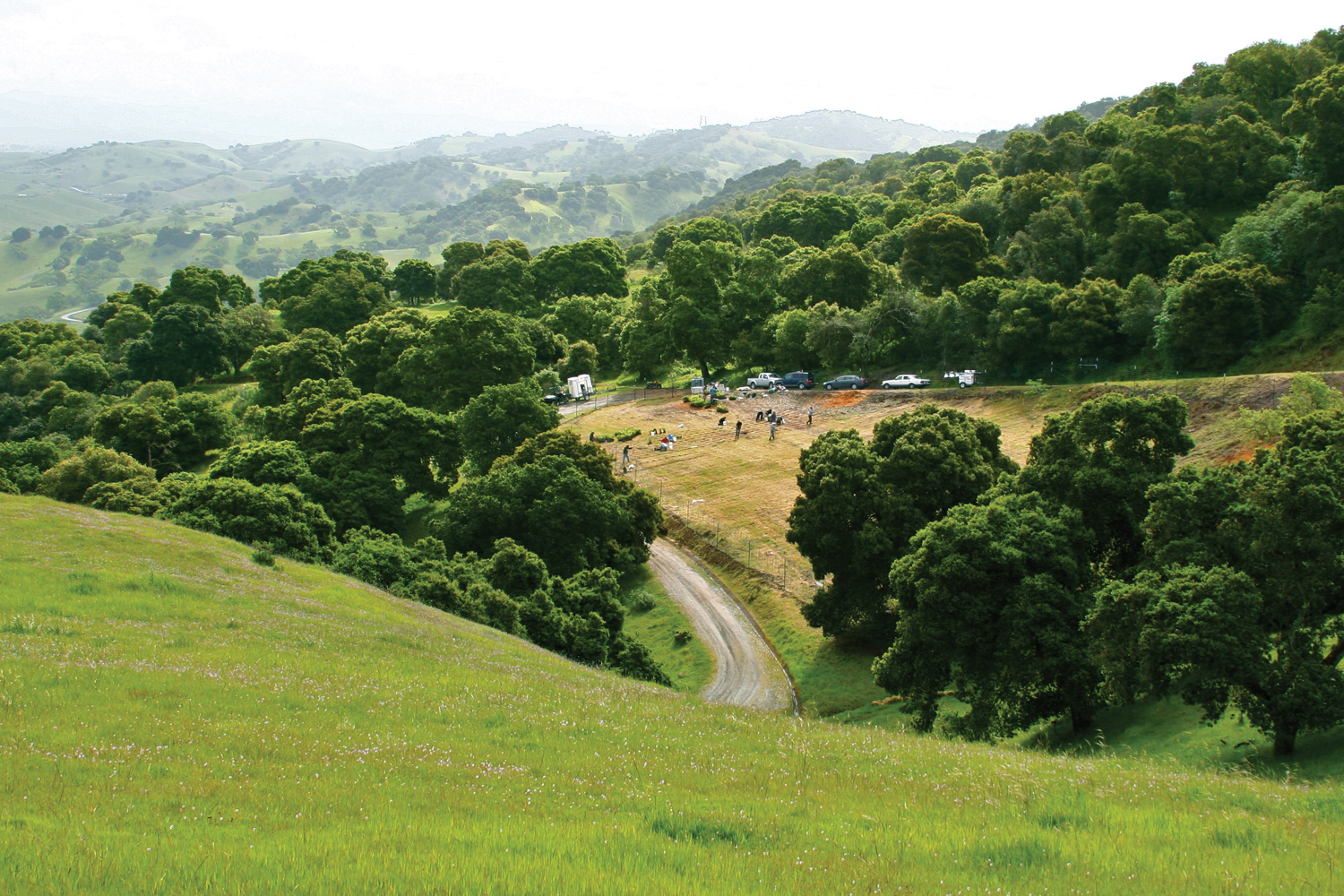
Estate vineyard, "Popelouchum" in San Juan Bautista, CA

The winery has changed focus in recent years from "every day table wines to high-end, boutique vintages". In 2006 it sold off its Big House and Cardinal Zin labels, and in 2010 its Pacific Rim brand. Reflecting on the decision in an interview with The New York Times, Randall said "My wines were O.K., but was I really doing anything distinctive or special? The world doesn't need these wines — I was writing and talking about terroir but I wasn't doing what I was saying. I wanted to be congruent with myself."

As part of his shift in focus, he acquired a 280-acre property in San Juan Bautista in 2009, "Popelouchum," which currently serves as Bonny Doon's estate vineyard in the Central Coast appellation. In addition to using the property to grow terroir wines, Grahm plans to use the property to hybridize vitis vinifera grapes that he hopes will be able to withstand extreme drought and "possibly outsmart climate change."

In 2008, as part of the winery's change in strategy, it sold its old tasting room in Bonny Doon, and relocated to Santa Cruz. It moved its administrative offices and wine cellar in Santa Cruz, and tasting room on Hwy 1 in Davenport, CA. As of 2024, these locations have since closed.

In 2018, the flagship Le Cigare Volant was reformulated for much earlier consumption (not aging) and priced significantly lower, notably dropping Mourvèdre and using much more Cinsault; the 2018 vintage was branded "Le Cigare Volant Cuvée Oumuamua".

In 2020, Grahm sold the company to WarRoom Ventures, LLC, but remained as winemaker and a partner with WarRoom. This also reduced the lineup from about 15 wines to four, all Rhone varietals, and decreasing the price to $15 to $20 per bottle: the flagship Le Cigare Volant (a red Rhone blend), Le Cigare Blanc (a Vermentino-based white blend), Vin Gris de Cigare (a Rhone-style rosé), and Picpoul (a single-varietal Rhone white).

== Philosophy ==
Grahm, a long-time promoter of "terroir", writes on Bonny Doon's website that he "lives for the possibility of one day creating a wine that is also a reflection of the place from whence it derives." Reflecting on the abandonment of his larger brands and criticizing the negociant-model of winery production that is dominant in the industry, he told The New York Times in an April 2009 interview, "You have to put your money where your mouth is. Purchased grapes are less risky, but you're never going to make a vin de terroir."

As part of Grahm's vision to "make a wine with the softest possible hand," he has been a strong proponent of biodynamic viticulture since he began adopting its practice in 2003. "Wines" he argues, "must be translations of the vineyard's own vitality," and by focusing on soil health—"the real cornerstone of vitality in wines"—he can "avoid excessive manipulation," and make wines that "can be said to be "acoustic," or "uninflected.""
