= Carole Meredith =

American geneticist

- Known for: Establishing the parentage of grape varieties
- Scientific career
- Fields: Grape genetics
- Workplaces: University of California, Davis

Carole P. Meredith is an American grape geneticist and was a professor at the Department of Viticulture and Enology of University of California, Davis.

== Career ==
Before she retired in 2003, Meredith and her research group pioneered the use of DNA typing to differentiate Vitis vinifera grape varieties and for elucidating their parentage, which gives insight into the varieties' history and place of origin. In 1996, Meredith and her research established the parentage of Cabernet Sauvignon, which was the first application of such techniques. Later, Chardonnay, Syrah, and Zinfandel followed. The research group showed that the varieties Zinfandel, Primitivo, and Crljenak Kaštelanski are identical. The varieties Charbono and Corbeau were also found to be identical.

In 2009, she was inducted into the Vintners Hall of Fame.

== Winemaking ==
In 1986, she moved to Napa Valley commuting to UC Davis where her husband, Steve Lagier, made wine at Robert Mondavi Winery. After her retirement from academia in January 2003, Meredith and her husband grow on 4 acres Syrah, Zinfandel, Malbec, and Mondeuse in the Mount Veeder AVA of Napa Valley under the Lagier-Meredith label. The first vines on their property were planted in 1994. As of 2022 the Lagier Meredith Vineyard has been managed by winemaker Aaron Pott who makes the wines under his own label Pott Wine.
