= UC Davis College of Agricultural and Environmental Sciences =

Agricultural college of UC Davis

University of California, Davis College of Agricultural and Environmental Sciences
- Type: Public professional school
- Established: 1922; 104 years ago
- Parent institution: University of California, Davis
- Dean: Ashley Stokes
- Location: 150 One Shields Avenue, Davis, California, U.S. 38°32′13″N 121°44′57″W
- Website: caes.ucdavis.edu

The College of Agricultural and Environmental Sciences (Ag&E) is one of four colleges of the University of California, Davis. Established in 1922, it offers degrees in 27 undergraduate majors and thirty-three graduate groups (i.e. M.S. and Ph.D.). As of July 2025, the College has been overseen by Dean Ashley Stokes.

Davis was founded as the University Farm in 1905, as part of the College of Agriculture at the main campus at Berkeley, but provided only a non-degree vocational program resulting in certificates. In 1922, to shut down agitation by agriculture interests to sever Davis and the entire College of Agriculture from the university, the Regents of the University of California authorized a two-year undergraduate program at Davis. This quickly evolved into a four-year program leading to the degree of bachelor of science in agriculture, which was first awarded in 1926. This is why the college dates its beginnings to 1922, when college-level courses were first offered at Davis.

In 1952, the College of Agriculture at Davis became independent of the College of Agriculture at Berkeley. Most agriculture-related departments were entirely transferred over the decades to Davis, so that Berkeley's original College of Agriculture evolved into an environmental sciences college which also includes a few departments that were never transferred (e.g., nutrition). In 1959, Davis achieved full administrative independence from Berkeley as a general campus of the UC system.

== Divisions ==
The college is organized into three divisions, which are then further subdivided into 14 departments, as follows:

=== Agricultural Sciences Division ===
- Department of Animal Science
- Department of Biological and Agricultural Engineering
- Department of Entomology and Nematology
- Department of Plant Pathology
- Department of Plant Sciences
- Department of Viticulture and Enology

=== Environmental Sciences Division ===
- Department of Environmental Science and Policy
- Department of Environmental Toxicology

- Founded in 1968, this department offered the first undergraduate degree in environmental toxicology at any university.

- Department of Land, Air and Water Resources
- Department of Wildlife, Fish, and Conservation Biology

- This department was started in the early 1970s under the name Department of Wildlife and Fisheries. It was given its current name in the mid-1980s as conservation was becoming an increasingly popular societal issue. Department faculty, cooperative extension specialists, postdoctoral researchers, and graduate students training and studying in fields including ecology, wildlife management, conservation biology, animal behavior, evolution, and population biology. It is home of the Museum of Wildlife and Fish Biology, which houses 60,000 specimens of vertebrates primarily used for teaching and research. Undergraduates may choose the wildlife, fish, and conservation biology major and take a Bachelor of Science.

=== Human Sciences Division ===
- Department of Agricultural and Resource Economics
- Department of Food Science and Technology
- Department of Human Ecology
- Department of Nutrition
