= Rhone Rangers =

Group of American winemakers

The term "Rhône Ranger" was coined by The Wine Spectator in their April 15, 1989 issue for winemaker Randall Grahm.

The Rhone Rangers are a group of American winemakers who promote the use of grape varieties from the Rhône Valley. They are mostly based on the West Coast, particularly California, and have created a not-for-profit organization for the promotion of wines containing at least 75% of the 22 Rhône grape varieties. The name is a pun on The Lone Ranger, and was coined by Wine Spectator to describe Randall Grahm for their 1989 April 15 issue, which featured Grahm dressed as the Lone Ranger under the title "The Rhône Ranger" (singular). The name was subsequently used for other winemakers.

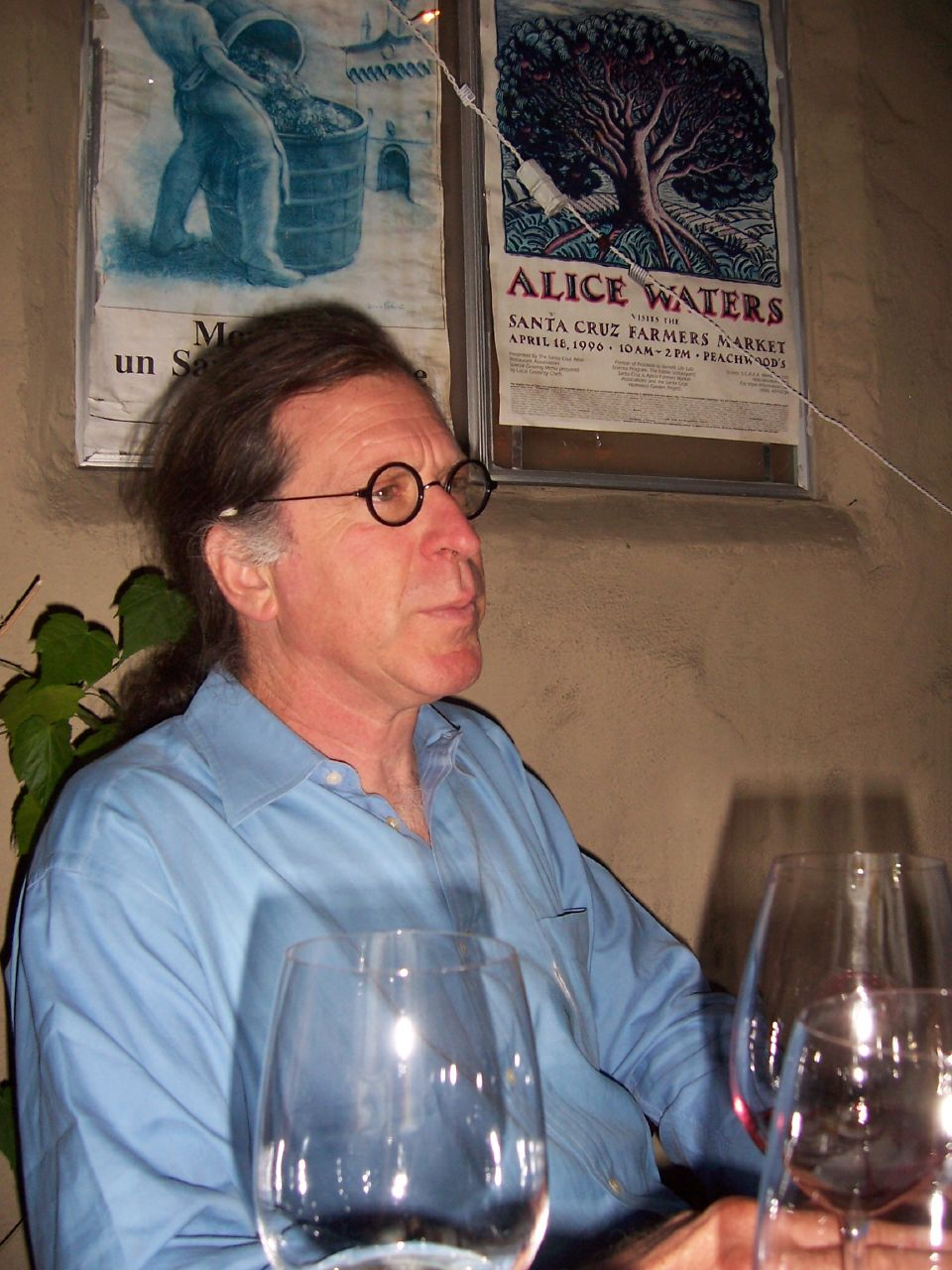
Randall Grahm of Bonny Doon Vineyard.

In the 1980s, Randall Grahm of Bonny Doon Vineyard and Bob Lindquist of Qupé Wine Cellars, among others, began popularizing the marketing of the Rhône varieties. Their success helped to revive plantings of many traditional Rhône grapes that were dying out in California like Grenache, Mourvedre and Viognier. Syrah also saw a dramatic increase in plantings after Gary Eberle, then with Estrella River Winery (now Meridian Vineyards) planted it in Paso Robles and made available the clone he used to other interested growers. With no formal structure or organization, the group disbanded in the early 1990s.

Beginning around 1998, a second wave of innovation in the Rhone Rangers movement began with John MacReady of Sierra Vista Winery as its executive director. The structure was loosely based on that of the Zinfandel Advocates and Producers, which had been successful in promoting Zinfandel in the industry. MacReady credited the new group's success to its acceptance of the use of Syrah as a blending grape, a controversial view in the eyes of some. Tablas Creek imported new clones of many of the 13 varieties allowed in Châteauneuf-du-Pape, including Grenache blanc, Counoise, and Picpoul blanc that had never before been used in California and made the clones available to other vineyards.

== See also ==
- Côtes du Rhône
- Gigondas AOC
- Châteauneuf-du-Pape AOC
