= Temecula Valley AVA =

American Viticultural Area in California

Coordinates: 33°31′36″N 117°05′23″W

Temecula Valley
- Wine region
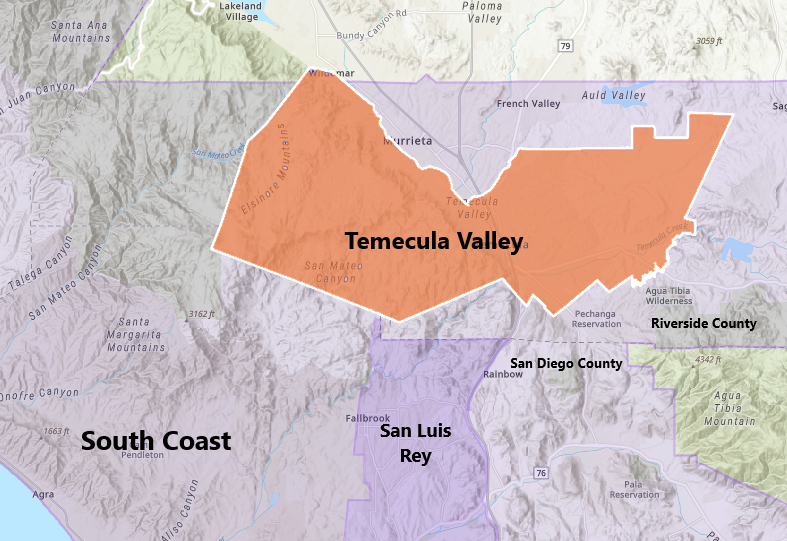
- Type: American Viticultural Area
- Year established: 1984; 1986 Amended; 1987 Amended; 2004 Amended
- Years of wine industry: 206
- Country: United States
- Part of: California, South Coast AVA, Riverside County
- Climate region: Region II, III, IV
- Heat units: 3598 GDD units
- Precipitation (annual average): 10 to 20 in (250–510 mm)
- Soil conditions: decomposed granitic rocky and sandy loam
- Total area: 33,000 acres (52 sq mi)
- Size of planted vineyards: 500 acres (200 ha)
- No. of vineyards: 42
- Grapes produced: Black Muscat, Cabernet Franc, Cabernet Sauvignon, Chardonnay, Chenin blanc, Cinsault, Cortese, Dolcetto, Gamay noir, Gewurztraminer, Malbec, Merlot, Mourvedre, Muscat Canelli, Muscat of Alexandria, Nebbiolo, Orange Muscat, Palomino, Petit Verdot, Petite Sirah, Pinot gris, Pinot noir, Riesling, Roussanne, Rubired, Sangiovese, Sauvignon blanc, Semillon, Syrah, Tannat, Viognier, Zinfandel
- Varietals produced: 30
- No. of wineries: 50

Temecula Valley is an American Viticultural Area (AVA) within the Temecula Valley landform, located in southwestern Riverside County, California nestled along the eastern slopes of the Santa Ana Mountains. It was established as the nation's 69th, the state's 42nd and the county's initial appellation on October 23, 1984 by the Bureau of Alcohol, Tobacco and Firearms (ATF), Treasury after reviewing petitions submitted by the Rancho California/Temecula Winegrowers Association and Callaway Vineyard and Winery, Temecula, California in 1981 proposing a viticultural area in Riverside County named "Temecula."

In 1982, the petitioners initially proposed multiple viticultural areas named "Temecula," "Murrieta," and "Rancho California" but the ATF did not adopt them.
In 2004, the AVA was renamed "Temecula Valley" by the Alcohol and Tobacco Tax and Trade Bureau (TTB), approving the 2001 petition submitted by the Temecula Valley Winegrowers Association. The petition stated the name change would provide a more accurate description of the Temecula geography and greater clarity as to its location for wine consumers and the public. The petition did not request any change to the established boundaries. This was the first AVA to change its name after the initial final ruling.
Temecula Valley encompasses 33,000 acres (52 sq mi) with 5,000 acres (8 sq mi) is located in a protected area referred to as the Citrus/Vineyard Zone. This area is generally located in and around the Rancho California Road area within Riverside County. County guidelines strictly enforce the number of acres needed to build a winery, lodging and other limited housing and commercial ventures.

== History ==
Both the name and the history of Temecula dates back hundreds of years, to the indigenous Luiseno Indians who called themselves "Temeku", or in anglicized form "Temecula" (/təˈmɛk.jə.lə/ tuh-MEH-kyoo-luh). This word may be roughly translated as "place where the sun breaks through the white mist." The term “Luiseño” dates back to the Spanish period (1797–1834), and was used to describe their enslavement to the Mission San Luis Rey.

The Pechanga Band of Natives call themselves Payómkawichum (the People of the West). Temecula's viticultural area, near the streets of Los Nogales Camino Del Vino, was identified as the site of the Temecula Massacre, where the Payómkawichum were ambushed and attacked by a group of Californios and Cahuilla natives in January 1846. The death count was estimated around 30 to 100.

Tensions remained high between Temecula Natives and settlers throughout the 19th century. In December 1875, a group of settlers banded together and forcibly removed the Payómkawichum from the area. They were left with little to none of their belongings and stranded a few miles south of the town site. Later, President Chester A. Arthur issued an Executive Order on June 27, 1882, and created the Pechanga Reservation.

The original Temecula petition stated that this description applied to the entire viticultural area, which is in a valley characterized by bright sun and misty marine air that flows inland from the Pacific Ocean. The 1984 decision noted that it is this marine air, which enters the Temecula Valley through gaps in the Santa Ana Mountains, that allows grape growing in this area. Franciscan priests from the early Alta California missions recorded visiting the Indians as early as October 1797. They later built an "Asistencia" near the village site of the Temekus, just south of where Murrieta Creek empties into the Temecula River, currently known as Temecula Canyon. As the name suggests, the "Asistencia" assisted the nearby Mission San Luis Rey in its work and provided lodging for traveling priests.

Temecula's viticultural history dates back to the mid-nineteenth century, if not earlier. Evidence of that fact is found in the records of Land Case Number 55, Southern District of California. In 1843, the Mission San Luis Rey granted Pablo Apis, one of its workers, one-half league, about 2,000 acres, of Temecula Rancho with "150 stocks of vines." This area is known today as "Little Temecula." The large planting suggests the Temecula vineyards in earlier times supplied wine to the Mission. The land was recognized for its viticultural purpose when purchased in 1846 by a French-born Californian Jean-Louis Vignes, a recognized vintner and ranchero in Pueblo de Los Ángeles. During the previous decade, Vignes has written to his relatives in France to persuade them and other "intelligent countrymen" to join in the development of California's wine trade At least eight of Vignes' relatives emigrated and it is likely Vignes selected Temecula Land Grant as prime vineyard land.

There is little official documentation of grape growing in Temecula during the latter half of the nineteenth century. However, promotion of the region as suitable for vines was widespread. The 1890 publication, "An Illustrated History of Southern California," described Temecula as 100 sq mi (64,000 acres) of valley lands and undulating hills. "The soil is adapted to a diversified agriculture: fruit and vine growing will be largely undertaken in the future."

Vineyards still were not flourishing in 1909 when Frank McDonald wrote "Thriving, Tempting Temecula." He records only one vineyard (no acreage indicated) of Zinfindel and Mission grapes one mile north of Temecula. Temecula's first real viticultural boom began with the advent of Prohibition in 1920. As the prices of grapes soared, most if not all Temecula's farmers took to planting grapes, although not in conspicuous acreage. Names like Escallier, Borel, Cazas, Domino and others to this day are recognized by old-time Temecula residents as grape growers of the 1920s and 1930s. Their vineyards were scattered throughout the current viticultural area.

Viticulture in Temecula was revived in the late 1960s with the coming of Rancho California. Leon Adams, the foremost chronicler of the American wine industry, promptly picked up on the developments in Temecula. In the 1973 publication, The Wines of America, Adams wrote:

My chief purpose on this trip just described was not to visit the Cucamonga vineyards, but to see two entirely new Southern districts where there were extensive new plantings of wine grapes. Philo Biane, president of Brookside Vineyard Company, had consented to show me the new Rancho California wine district at Temecula in southwestern Riverside County.

Vincenzo and Audry Cilurzo established the first modern commercial vineyard in the Temecula Valley in 1968. At the same time, Guasti-based Brookside Winery planted its own vineyard. Mount Palomar Winery was established in 1969, by John Poole, former owner of the radio station KBIG and who also established one of the nation's first UHF television stations (Channel 22 in Los Angeles), and created Los Angeles' first commercially successful FM radio station. Poole introduced a number of "firsts" in the Temecula Valley, most significantly beginning the trend to Mediterranean grape varieties, planting the first Sangiovese grapes, established the first wine cave in the area and also the oldest outdoor Sherry Solera in the United States. In 1971, Brookside produced the first wines from Temecula grapes at their Guasti winery. The Callaway Vineyard and Winery began farming grapes in 1969 and opened the first public tasting room in 1974. Owner Ely Callaway Jr. also founded Callaway Golf. John Poole's Mount Palomar Winery opened its doors to the public in 1975, and in 1978 the Cilurzos opened the third Temecula winery. Their original vineyard is now owned by Maurice Carrie Winery.

== Terroir ==
=== Topography and Climate ===
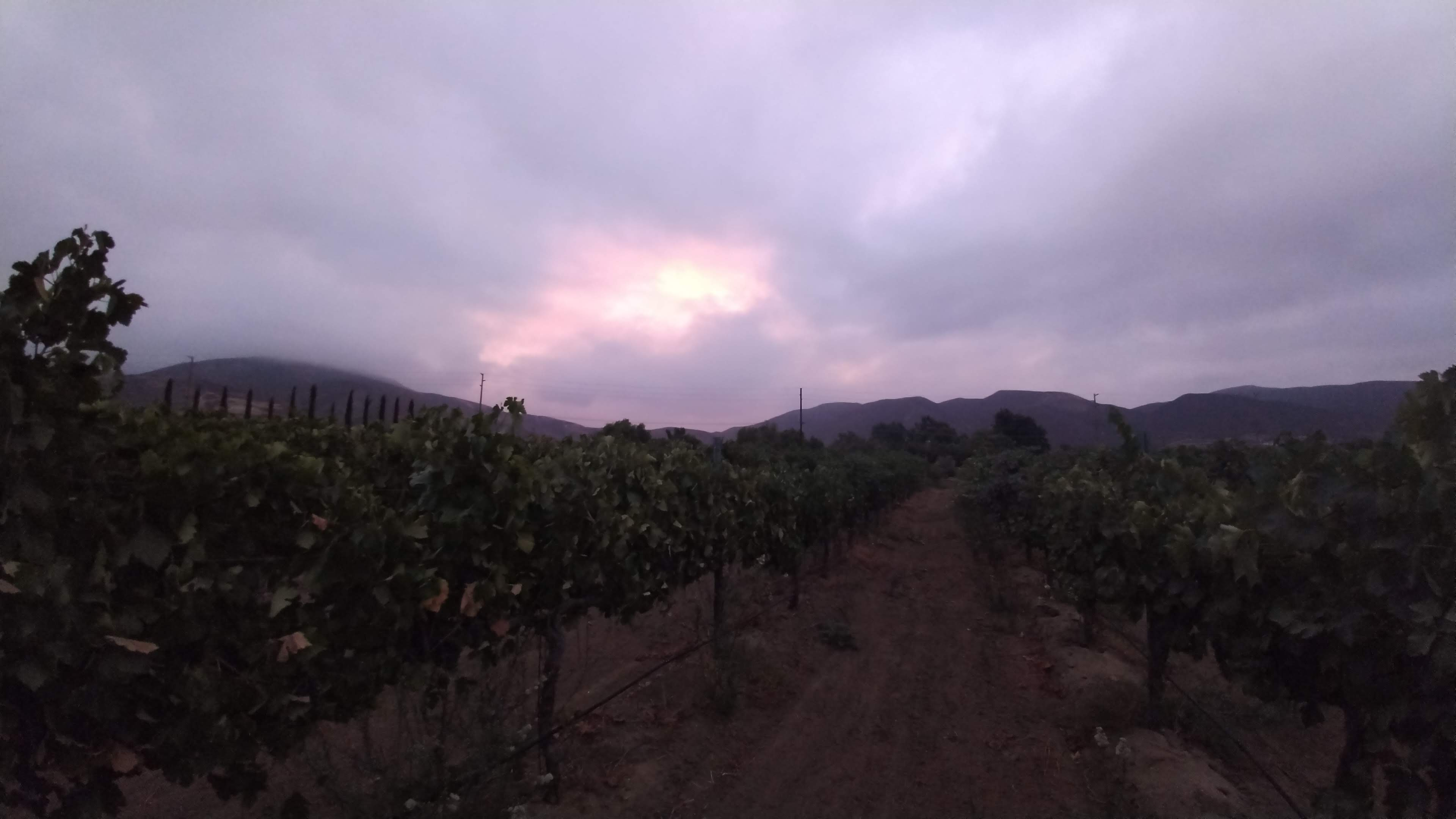
Temecula Valley Vineyard Sunrise

The Temecula Valley is located more than 300 miles (500 km) south of Napa, resulting in a slightly higher angle to the sun and greater solar intensity. A look at the native chaparral shows that Temecula is in a relatively low rainfall region. These two factors contribute to an early growing season that generally runs from March through September. Rains rarely interrupt the harvest season, an important factor in wine quality. Extensive research has shown that the Temecula Valley is ideal for growing high-quality wine grapes as mist often lingers until mid-morning on the 1,400-foot (430 m) plateau, located below the peaks of the local mountain ranges.

Significant cooling factors affect the flavor development of the grapes. As the sun warms the inland valleys east of Temecula, the air rises, forming a low-pressure area. The colder, heavier air from the Pacific Ocean, 22 miles (35 km) from Temecula, is then drawn inland. The coastal mountain range allows the colder air to pass inland through gaps and low spots. The Rainbow Gap and the Temecula Gorge are two of these low places in the mountains, and just beyond them lay the Temecula Valley. The cool air flowing inland moderates the daytime temperatures and helps to create a pattern of warm sunny days and cool nights, ideal conditions for the best wine grapes.
Another meteorological factor affecting the valley's climate is the "lapse rate." It involves the altitude of the vineyard land and the height of the surrounding mountains. Temecula vineyards are located approximately 1,000 to 1,600 feet (305–488 m) above sea level. The surrounding mountains average 2,000 to 11,000 feet (610–3,353 m). These high elevations mean cooler air, a temperature drop of 3 °F (2 °C) for every 1,000 feet (300 m) feet of altitude gain. The heavy cold air that collects between the high peaks during the night drains off the heights much like water, joining cold moist air from the Santa Margarita River, creating a double cooling effect. As a result, nighttime lows in and around Temecula are very cool. The cool nighttime temperatures are critical in developing high-quality grapes.

=== Soils ===
Temecula Valley soils are another significant influence on wine quality. The soils are created from decomposing granitic materials and are excellent for growing high-quality grapes. Grapevines require well-drained soils with roots that are not constantly wet. The granitic soils permit the water to drain through quite easily. Granitic soils, which are a light sandy loam, contribute to clean, pure varietal flavors without odd or herbaceous flavors that wetter soil may create. The USDA plant hardiness zones range from 9b to 10b.

== Tourism ==
Grapes and wineries in the AVA

The popularity of the Temecula Valley Wine Country and Pechanga Resort & Casino have been the driving forces in a fourfold increase in visitor spending in the valley from $131 million in 2000 to an estimated $538 million in 2006, according to a report released by the Temecula Valley Convention & Visitors Bureau. According to Visit Temecula Valley's 2018 economic impact report, there was a 26% increase in tourism spending, reaching $1.1 billion spent, up from nearly $900 million spent in 2017.

The Temecula Valley is a major tourist destination on weekends. There are over 40 wineries offering public wine tasting. Many of the wineries have tasting rooms designed to service scores of people at once. Many are also wedding destination venues, host live music performances in the summer, and offer lodging such as bed and breakfast and resort accommodations, as well as vineyard tours, sunset barbecues and hot air balloon rides. Major annual events include the Temecula Valley Balloon & Wine Festival and the Harvest Wine Celebration.

== Temecula Agricultural Conservancy ==
Concurrently, the Temecula Agricultural Conservancy (TAC), a 501(c)(3) non-profit public benefit corporation, was formed with the primary mission of preserving vineyards and open space suitable for vineyards. TAC will work with the county supervisors to implement the new zoning ordinance by holding open space, vineyards and/or conservation easements, ensuring that the land remains in vineyards in perpetuity.

TAC also works with vineyard owners who wish to voluntarily protect their vineyards with conservation easements in an effort to ensure that the vineyards remain. Conservation easements are used to preserve farmland and open space throughout the United States. An agricultural conservation easement recorded on vineyard land limits the future use of that land to vineyards in perpetuity, but the vineyard owner continues to own and farm the land. By donating a conservation easement to TAC, a vineyard owner can receive a charitable tax deduction. Grants provided by the California Farmland Conservancy Program are available to organizations like TAC. These grants can be used to purchase conservation easements from vineyard owners.

== Temecula Valley Winegrowers Association ==
The Temecula Valley Winegrowers Association is a nonprofit regional organization (501(C)(6)) dedicated to promoting the making and growing of quality wine and wine grapes in the Temecula Valley appellation.
