= California wine =

Wine made from grapes grown in California, United States

California
- Wine region
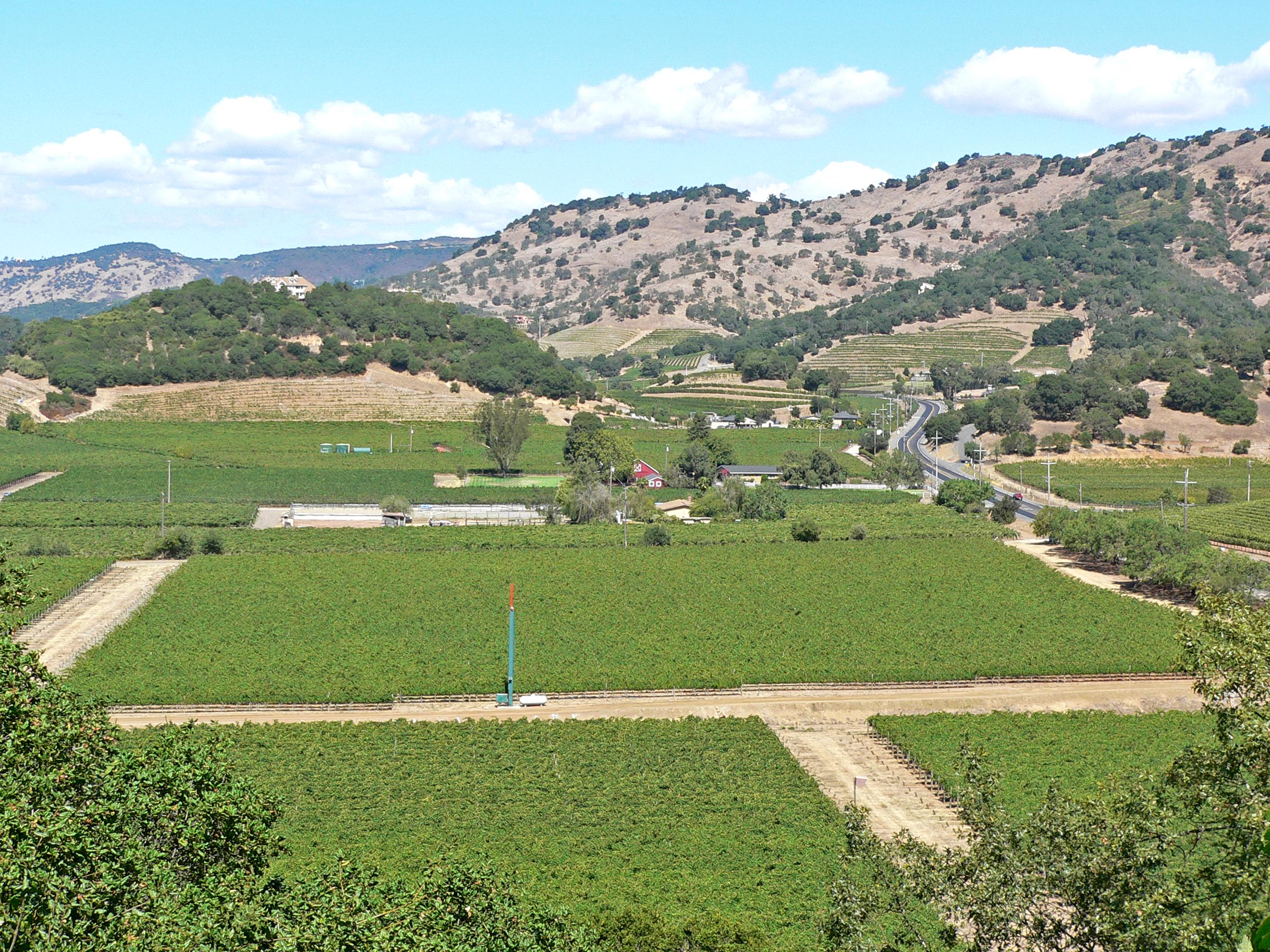
- Vineyards in the Napa Valley AVA
- Official name: State of California
- Type: U.S. State Appellation
- Year established: 1850
- Years of wine industry: 257
- Country: United States
- Sub-regions: List of California AVAs
- Total area: 100 million acres (155,779 sq mi)
- Size of planted vineyards: 477,475 acres (193,227 ha)
- No. of vineyards: Over 5,900
- Grapes produced: Albariño, Alicante Bouschet, Alvarelhão, Barbera, Bastardo, Black Muscat, Cabernet Franc, Cabernet Sauvignon, Carignan, Charbono, Chardonnay, Chenin blanc, Cinsaut, Colombard, Concord, Dolcetto, Dornfelder, Flora, Freisa, Gamay Beaujolais, Gamay noir, Gewürztraminer, Grenache, Malbec, Malvasia, Marsanne, Merlot, Mourvèdre, Muscat Canelli, Muscat of Alexandria, Nebbiolo, Niagara, Orange Muscat, Palomino, Petit Verdot, Petite Sirah, Pinot blanc, Pinot gris, Pinot Meunier, Pinot noir, Primitivo, Riesling, Roussanne, Rubired, Ruby Cabernet, Sangiovese, Sauvignon blanc, Sémillon, Souzão, Symphony, Syrah, Tempranillo, Teroldego, Tinta Amarela, Tinta Cao, Tinta Madeira, Touriga Nacional, Trebbiano, Trousseau gris, Valdiguié, Verdelho, Viognier, Zinfandel
- No. of wineries: 4,864 (January 2025)

California wine refers to wine grapes grown in the U.S. state appellation of California. State names in the United States automatically qualify as legal appellations of origin for wine produced from grapes grown in that state and do not require registration with the Alcohol and Tobacco Tax and Trade Bureau (TTB) of the Treasury Department. TTB was created in January 2003, when the Bureau of Alcohol, Tobacco and Firearms, or ATF, was extensively reorganized under the provisions of the Homeland Security Act of 2002.

California's rich viticulture history began in the late 1700s when Spanish Jesuit missionaries planted Vitis vinifera vines native to the Mediterranean region in their established missions to produce wine for religious services. In the 1770s, Spanish missionaries continued the practice under the direction of Father Junípero Serra, who planted California's first vineyard at Mission San Juan Capistrano.
Wine production grew steadily after Prohibition, but was known mostly for its sweet, port-style and jug wine products. As the market favored French brands, California's table wine business grew modestly, but quickly gained international prominence at the Paris Wine Tasting of 1976, when renowned French oenophiles, in a blind tasting, ranked the California wines higher than the premier French labels in the Chardonnay (white) and Cabernet Sauvignon (red) categories. The result caused a 'shock' in viticulture industry since France was regarded as foremost producer of the world's finest table wines. This event contributed to expanding the recognition and prestige of vintners in the New World, specifically, the "Golden State".

The state produces about ninety percent of the American wine supply and is the fourth largest wine producer among the world's independent nations. California has more than 4,200 wineries ranging from home-grown and small boutiques to large corporations with international distribution, and even more vineyards and growers, at close to 6,000. Wine Country, in Northern California, is an internationally recognized premier wine-growing region.

== History ==
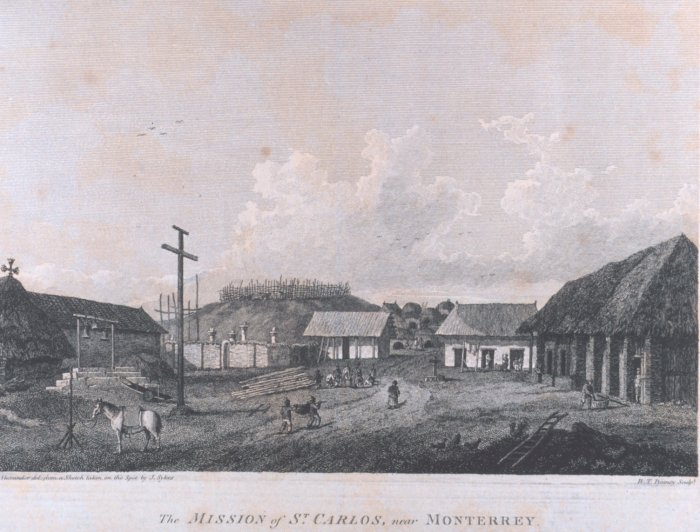
Spanish mission of St. Carlos founded near Monterey

The state of California was first introduced to Vitis vinifera vines, a species of wine grapes native to the Mediterranean region, in the 18th century by the Spanish missionaries, who planted vineyards with each mission they established. The wine was used for religious sacraments as well as for daily life. Cuttings from the vine of the "common black grape" (as it was known) brought to the New World by Hernán Cortés in 1520 were used to start the vineyards of Mexico. The grape's association with the church caused it to become known as the Mission grape, which was to become the dominant grape variety in California until the 20th century.

The California Gold Rush in the mid-19th century brought waves of new settlers to the region, increasing the population and local demand for wine. The newly growing wine industry took hold in Northern California around the counties of Sonoma and Napa. The first commercial winery in California, Buena Vista Winery, was founded in 1857 by Agoston Haraszthy and is located in Sonoma, California. John Patchett opened the first commercial winery in the area that is now Napa County in 1859. During this period some of California's oldest wineries were founded including Buena Vista Winery, Gundlach Bundschu, Inglenook Winery, Markham Vineyards and Schramsberg Vineyards. Chinese immigrants played a prominent role in developing the Californian wine industry during this period - building wineries, planting vineyards, digging the underground cellars and harvesting grapes. Some even assisted as winemakers before the passing of the Chinese Exclusion Act, which severely affected the Chinese community in favor of encouraging "white labor". By 1890, most of the Chinese workers were out of the wine industry.

=== Phylloxera and Prohibition ===
The late 19th century also saw the advent of the phylloxera epidemic, a type of parasite similar to aphids, which had already ravaged France and other European vineyards. Vineyards were destroyed, and many smaller operations went out of business. The remedy of grafting resistant American rootstock was well known, and the Californian wine industry was able to rebound quickly, utilizing the opportunity to expand the plantings of new grape varieties. By the turn of the 20th century, nearly 300 grape varieties were being grown in the state, supplying approximately 800 wineries.

Worldwide recognition seemed imminent until January 16, 1919, when the 18th Amendment ushered in the beginning of Prohibition. Vineyards were ordered to be uprooted, and cellars were destroyed. Some vineyards and wineries were able to survive by converting to table grape or grape juice production. A few more were able to stay in operation to continue to provide churches sacramental wine, an allowed exception to the Prohibition laws. By the time Prohibition was repealed in 1933, only 140 wineries were still in operation.

=== Modern era ===
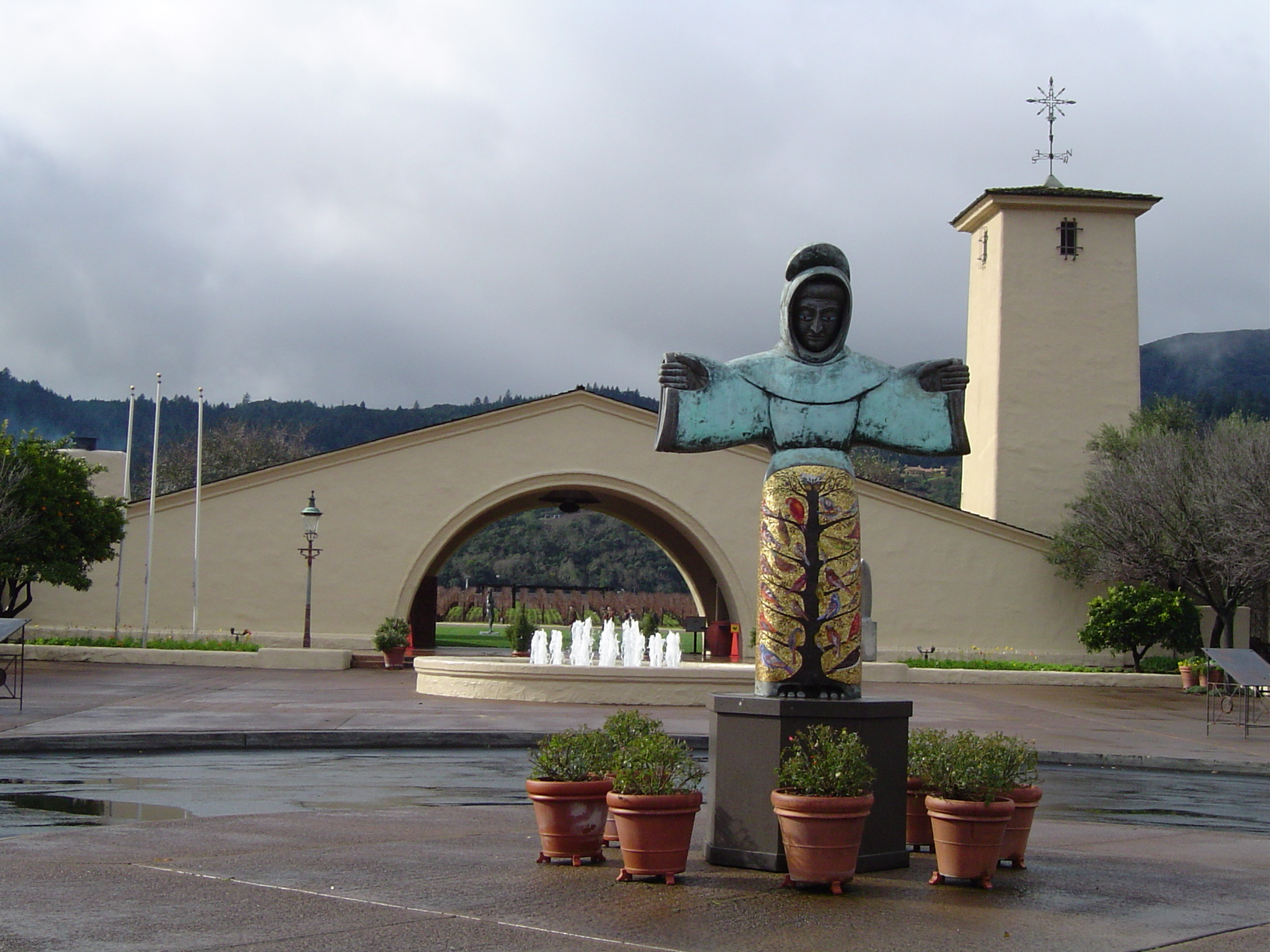
The Robert Mondavi Winery was designed to reflect the winemaking history of the Spanish missions.

The Californian wine industry slowly recovered from Prohibition. By the 1960s, it was primarily known for its sweet port-style wines made from Carignan and Thompson Seedless grapes and jug wines. A new wave of vintners emerged ushering in a renaissance period in California wine production with techniques strengthening the grape production, fermentation and bottling processes. Several well-known wineries began in this decade, including Robert Mondavi, Heitz Wine Cellars, and David Bruce Winery in the Santa Cruz Mountains. As the quality of Californian wine improved, the region started to receive international attention. A watershed event in the viticulture industry occurred in 1976 to celebrate the United States Bicentennial. British wine connoisseur, merchant and founder of France's first private wine school, L'Academie du Vin, Steven Spurrier, organized the Paris Wine Tasting of 1976 where renowned French oenophiles participated in a blind tasting to judge the best wines from California's wine regions and France's prestigious Bordeaux and Burgundy regions. George Taber, the sole journalist who attended the event, penned the article "Judgment of Paris" in Time magazine reporting the shocking results when the local judges ranked the California vintages higher than the premier French labels in both Chardonnay (white) and Cabernet Sauvignon (red) categories. As Jim Barrett, general manager/part owner of Chateau Montelena whose 1973 Chardonnay ranked the highest, said: "Not bad for kids from the sticks." The 1976 event led to expanding the recognition and prestige of vintners in the New World, specifically, California.

In 2010, it was reported that, for the first time in 16 years, California wine sales were down. This was not due to a decrease in drinking wine as much as it was a decrease in customers' willingness to spend large amounts on wine. Jon Fredrikson, president of Gomberg, Fredrikson & Associates, said that although sales of US$3 (equivalent to $4.43 in 2025) to US$6 (equivalent to $8.86 in 2025) a bottle of wine and US$9 (equivalent to $13.29 in 2025) to US$12 (equivalent to $17.72 in 2025) wine had seen growth, sales of wine over US$20 (equivalent to $29.53 in 2025) had stagnated. Much of this loss in the market was occurring in overseas sales, as opposed to U.S. sales in 2010. California wine export volume has shown impressive growth and demonstrating increased popularity in a highly competitive global market. Its vintages continue to perform around the world, especially in Southeast Asia, Mexico and the EU. California vintners represent 80% of U.S. wine production and 95% of U.S. wine exports. Honore Comfort, Wine Institute vice president of international marketing commented, "...there is no doubt that California wines will remain a top choice for wine drinkers around the world."

Demand for U.S. wine began to flatten in 2018 but COVID-19 pandemic distorted sales and shipments as consumers temporarily bought more. In 2024, as much as 500,000 tons of grapes went unharvested as demand decreased, and from October 2024 and August 2025, California growers removed nearly 40,000 acres of vineyards, leaving the state with 477,475 bearing and nonbearing acres. Fresno County was most affected with 18% of its planted acreage removed, followed by San Joaquin County at 12%. Monterey, Napa and Sonoma counties were also affected.

== Climate and geography ==
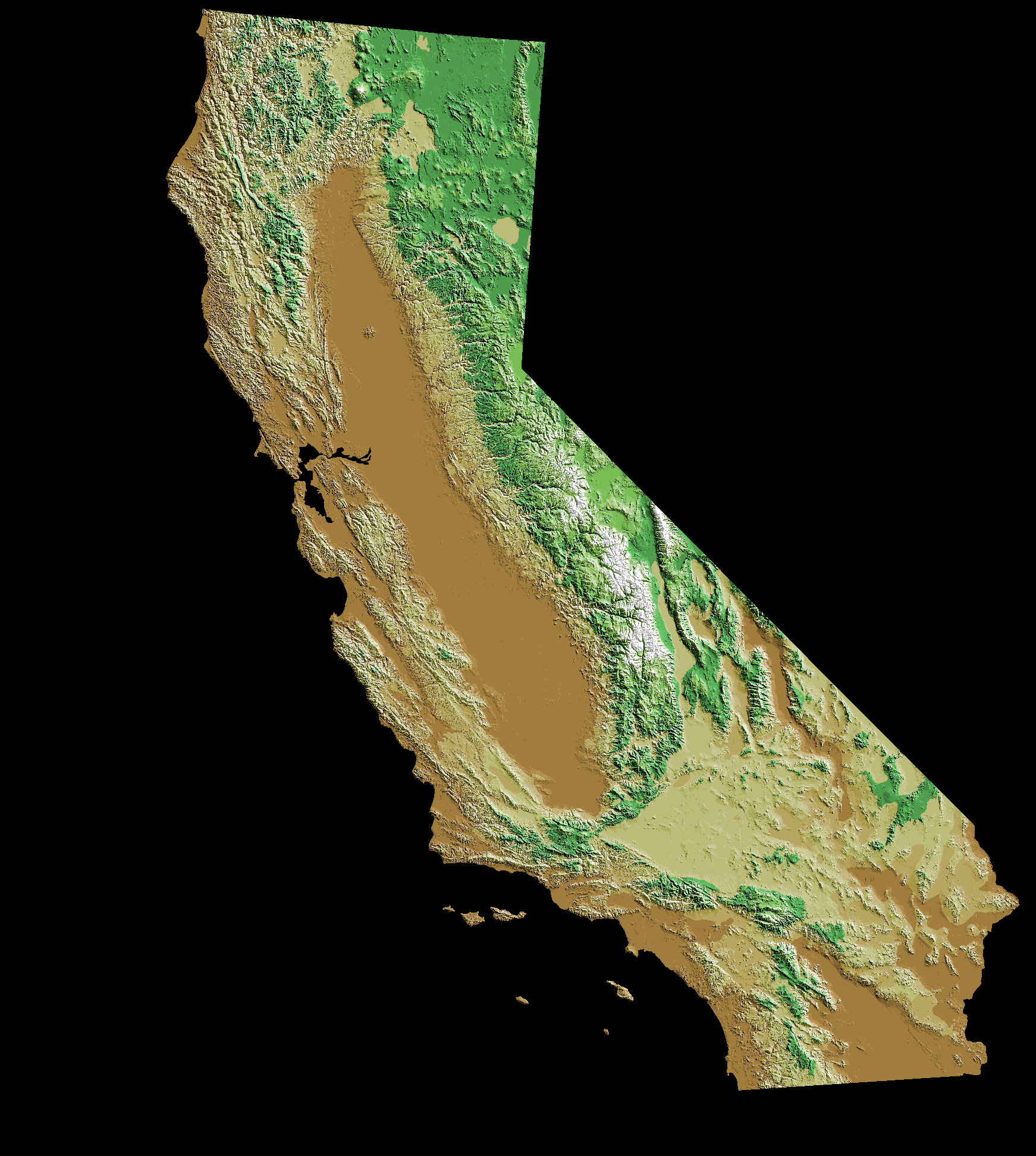
Landmass and elevations of California

California is a very geologically diverse region and varies greatly in the range of climates and terroirs that can be found. Most of the state's wine regions are found between the Pacific coast and the Central Valley. The Pacific Ocean and large bays, like San Francisco and Monterey Bays, serve as tempering influences to the wine regions nearby providing cool winds and fog that balance the heat and sunshine. While drought can be a vinicultural hazard, most areas of California receive sufficient amounts of rainfall with the annual precipitation in regions north of San Francisco between 24 and 45 inches (610–1,143 mm) and southern areas receiving 13 to 20 inches (330–508 mm). Winters are mild with little threat of frost damage though springtime. To curb the threat of frost, vineyard owners will often employ the use of wind machines, sprinklers and smudge pots to protect the vines.

While California's wine regions can be generally classified as a Mediterranean climate, there are also regions with more continental dry climates. Proximity to the Pacific and unobstructed access to the coastal wind and fog dictates the relative coolness of a wine region. Areas surrounded by mountain barriers, like some parts of Sonoma and Napa counties will be warmer due to the lack of this cooling influence. The soil types and landforms of California vary greatly, having been influenced by the plate tectonics of the North American and Pacific Plates. In some areas the soils can be so diverse that vineyards will establish blocks of the same vine variety planted on different soils for purpose of identifying different blending components. This diversity is one of the reasons why California has so many different and distinct American Viticultural Areas.

=== Water and irrigation ===
The average vineyard in California uses 318 gallons of water to produce a single gallon of wine through irrigation. The average depends, in part, on the region where the grapes are grown, with 243 gallons of water per wine gallon in the North Coast region to 471 gallons per on the Central Coast.

== Wine regions ==
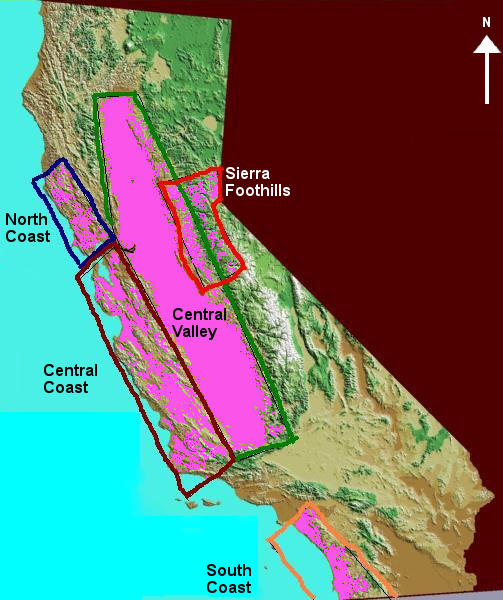
General locations of California's wine regions

California has over 477,000 acres (193,000 ha) planted under vines mostly located in a stretch of land covering over 700 miles (1,100 km) from Mendocino County to the southwestern tip of Riverside County. There are 147 American Viticultural Areas (AVAs), including the well-known Napa, Russian River Valley, Rutherford, Sonoma Valley and Santa Ynez Valley AVAs. The Central Valley is California's largest wine region stretching for 300 miles (480 km) from the Sacramento Valley south to the San Joaquin Valley. This one region produces nearly 75% of all California wine grapes and includes many of California's bulk, box and jug wine producers like Gallo, Franzia and Bronco Wine Company.

California is often divided into four main regions:

- North Coast – Includes most of North Coast, California, north of San Francisco Bay. The large North Coast AVA covers most of the region. Notable wine regions include historical Napa and Sonoma Counties with the AVAs within them. Mendocino and Lake Counties also reside in this region.
- Central Coast – Includes most of the Central Coast of California and the area surrounding San Francisco Bay extending south through the renown Monterey, San Luis Obispo and Santa Barbara Counties. The vast Central Coast AVA encompasses the area containing notable wine regions Livermore Valley AVA, Santa Clara Valley AVA, San Francisco Bay AVA, Santa Cruz Mountains AVA, Monterey AVA, Paso Robles AVA, SLO Coast AVA, Santa Maria Valley AVA and Santa Ynez Valley AVA.
- South Coast – Includes portion of Southern California, namely the coastal regions south of Los Angeles down to the border with Mexico. Notable wine regions in this area include Temecula Valley AVA, Antelope Valley/Leona Valley AVA, San Pasqual Valley AVA and Ramona Valley AVA. Local vintiers recently succeeded to have the San Luis Rey established as a viticultural area. Los Angeles County contains four viticultural areas: Malibu Coast AVA, Malibu-Newton Canyon AVA, Saddle Rock-Malibu AVA and Palos Verdes Peninsula AVA.
- Central Valley – Includes California's Central Valley and the Sierra Foothills AVA. Notable wine regions in this area include the Lodi, Madera and Squaw Valley-Miramonte AVAs.

== Grapes and wines ==
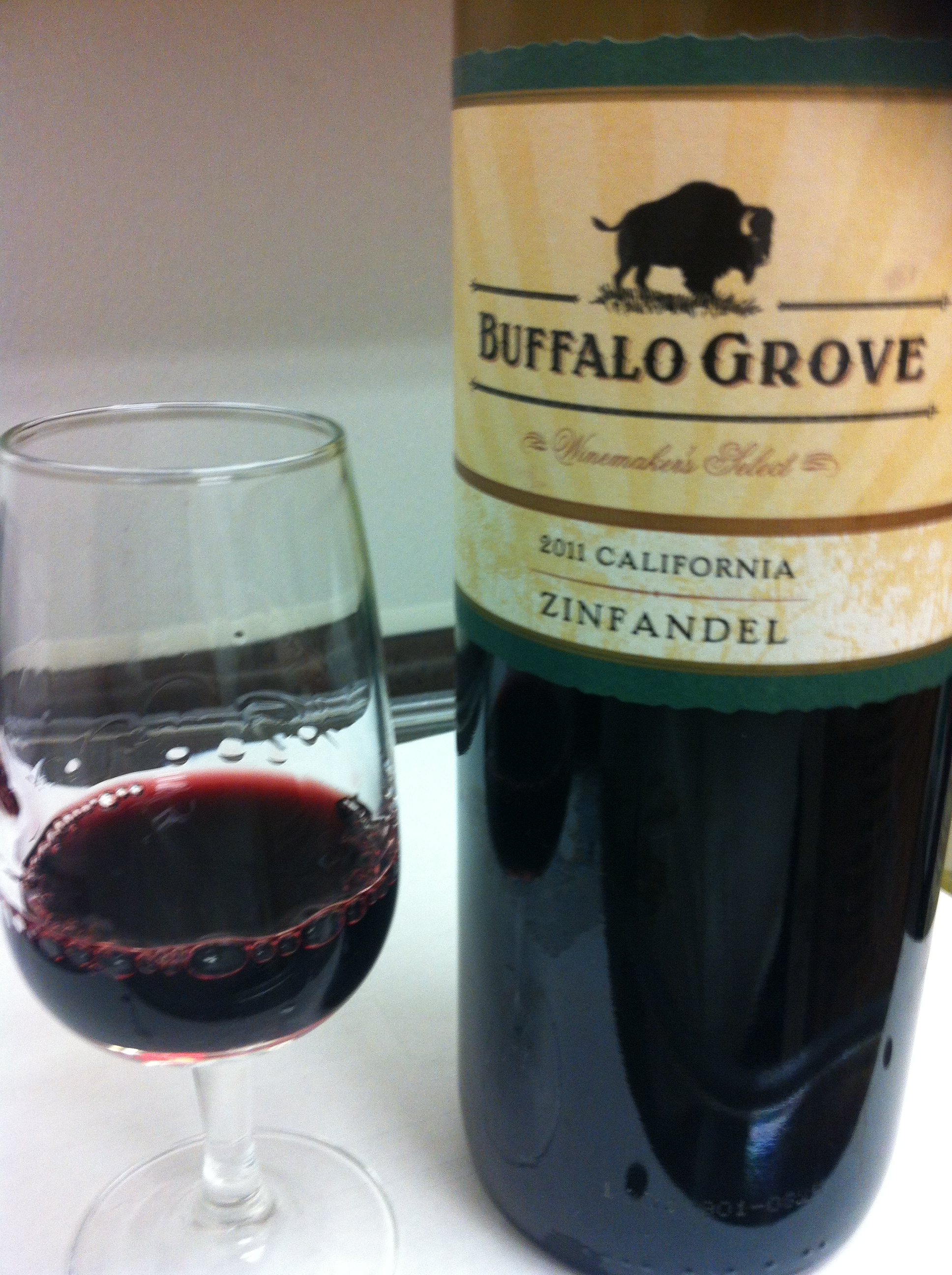
A California Zinfandel

Over one hundred grape varieties are grown in California including French, Italian and Spanish as well as hybrid grapes and new Vitis vinifera varieties developed at the UC Davis Department of Viticulture and Enology. The seven leading grape varieties are:

- Cabernet Sauvignon
- Chardonnay
- Merlot
- Pinot noir
- Sauvignon blanc
- Syrah
- Zinfandel

Other important red wine grapes include Barbera, Cabernet Franc, Carignan, Grenache, Malbec, Mourvèdre, Petite Sirah, Petit Verdot, Sangiovese, and Tannat. Important white wine varietals include Chenin blanc, French Colombard, Gewürztraminer, Marsanne, Muscat Canelli, Pinot blanc, Pinot gris, Riesling, Roussane, Sémillon, Trousseau gris, and Viognier.

Up until the late 1980s, the Californian wine industry was dominated by the Bordeaux varietals and Chardonnay. Sales began to drop as wine drinkers grew bored with the familiarity of these wines. Groups of winemakers like Rhône Rangers and a new wave of Italian winemakers dubbed "Cal-Ital" reinvigorated the industry with new wine styles made from different varieties like Syrah, Viognier, Sangiovese and Pinot grigio. The Santa Cruz-based Bonny Doon Vineyard was one of the first wineries to promote these grape varieties in California actively. The large variety of wine grapes also encourages a large variety of wines. California produces wines made in nearly every single known wine style including sparkling, dessert and fortified wines. In the early 21st century, vintners have begun reviving heirloom grape varieties, such as Trousseau gris and Valdiguié.

=== New World wine styles ===
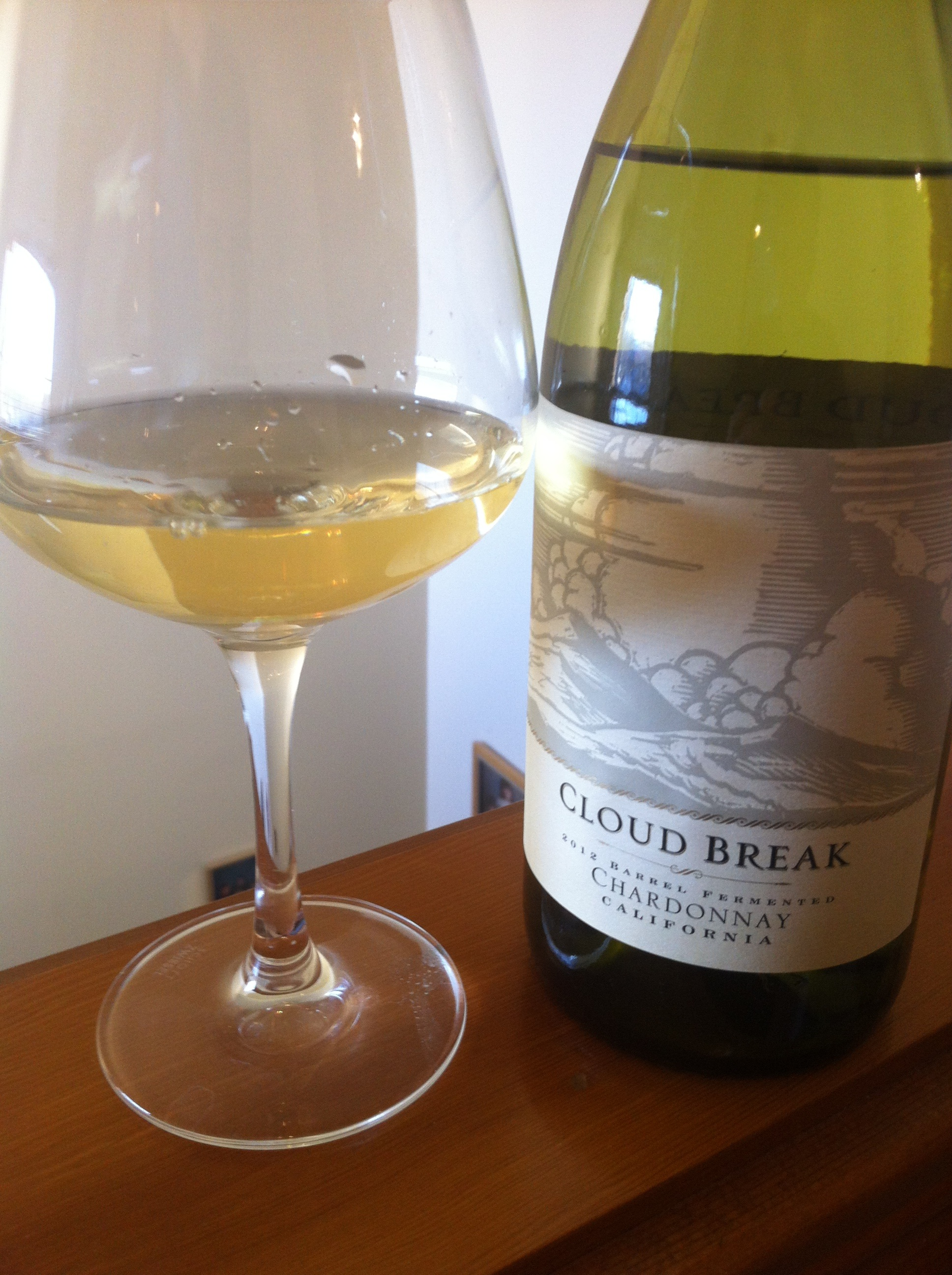
A barrel-fermented California Chardonnay

While Californian winemakers do craft wines in more "Old World" or European wine styles, most Californian wines favor simpler, more fruit dominant New World wines. The reliably warm weather allows many wineries to use very ripe fruit which creates a more fruit forward rather than earthy or mineralic style of wine. It also creates the opportunity for higher alcohol levels with many Californian wines having over 13.5 percent alcohol content. The style of Californian Chardonnay differs greatly from wines like Chablis with Californian winemakers frequently using malolactic fermentation and oak aging to make buttery, full bodied wines. Californian Sauvignon blancs are not as herbaceous as wines from the Loire Valley or New Zealand and are more acidic. Some Sauvignon blanc are given time in oak which can dramatically change the profile of the wine. Robert Mondavi first pioneered this style as a Fume blanc which other Californian winemakers have adopted. However, that style is not strictly defined to mean an oak wine.

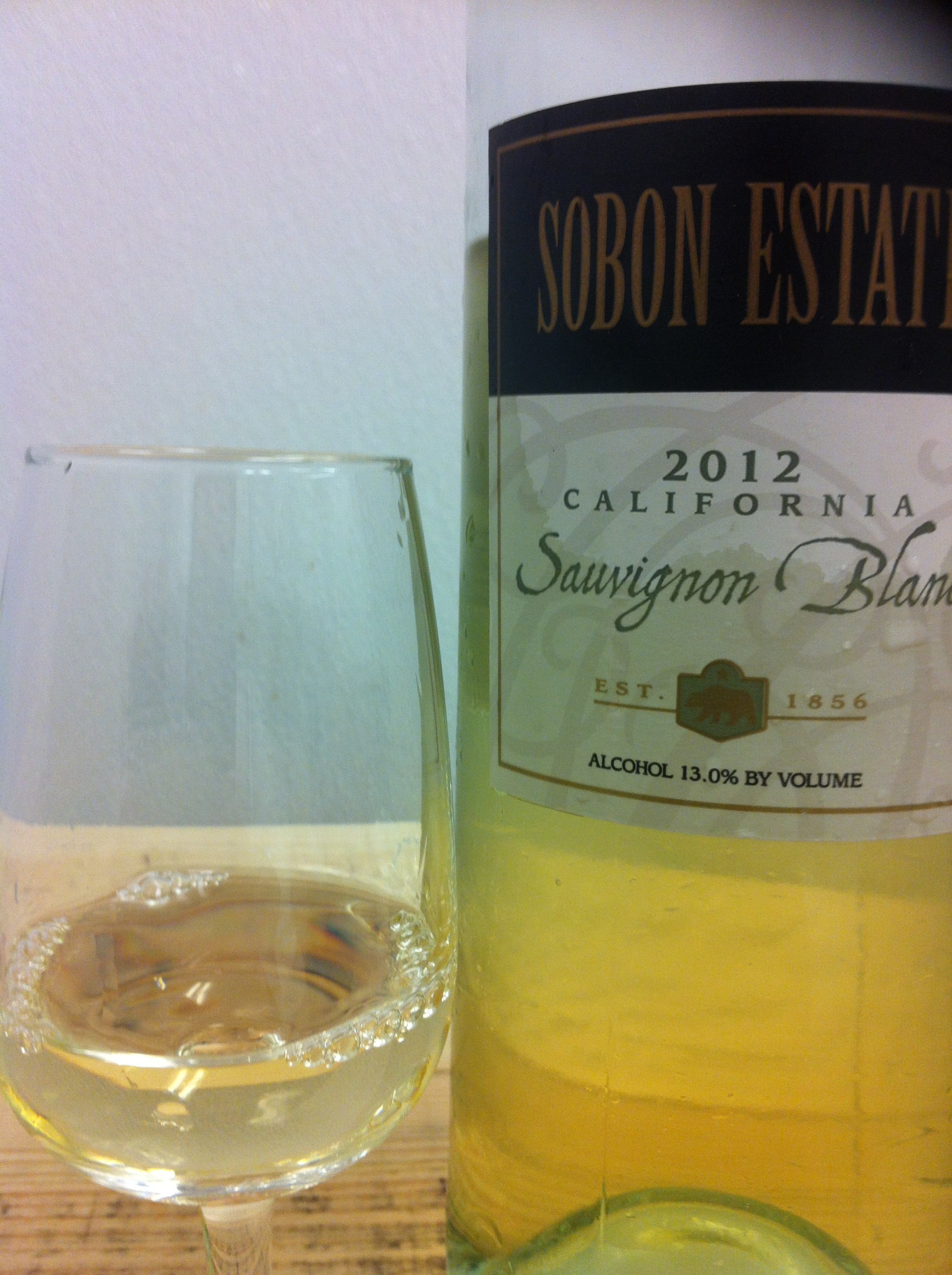
A Sauvignon blanc from California

The style of California Cabernet Sauvignon that first put California on the world's wine map at the Judgment of Paris is still a trademark style today. The wines are known for their concentration of fruits which produces lush, rich wines. Merlot became widely planted in the 1990s due to its wide popularity, and is still the highest selling of all varietal wines in the country. Many sites that were ill-suited for the grape began to produce harsh, characterless wines trying to model Cabernet. Merlot, when planted on better sites tend to produce a plush, concentrated style. The profile of Californian Pinot noir generally takes on a more intense, fruity style than the subtler, more elegant wines of Burgundy or Oregon. Until being passed up by Cabernet in 1998, Zinfandel was the most widely planted red wine grape in California. This was due in part to the wide popularity of White Zinfandel. Despite being made from the same grape, the only similarity between White and Red Zinfandel is the name. Zinfandel is a powerful, fruity wine with high levels of acidity and a jam-type flavor. White Zinfandel is a thin, slightly sweet blush wine. While the grape does have European origins, Zinfandel is considered a unique American style grape.

=== Sparkling and dessert wines ===
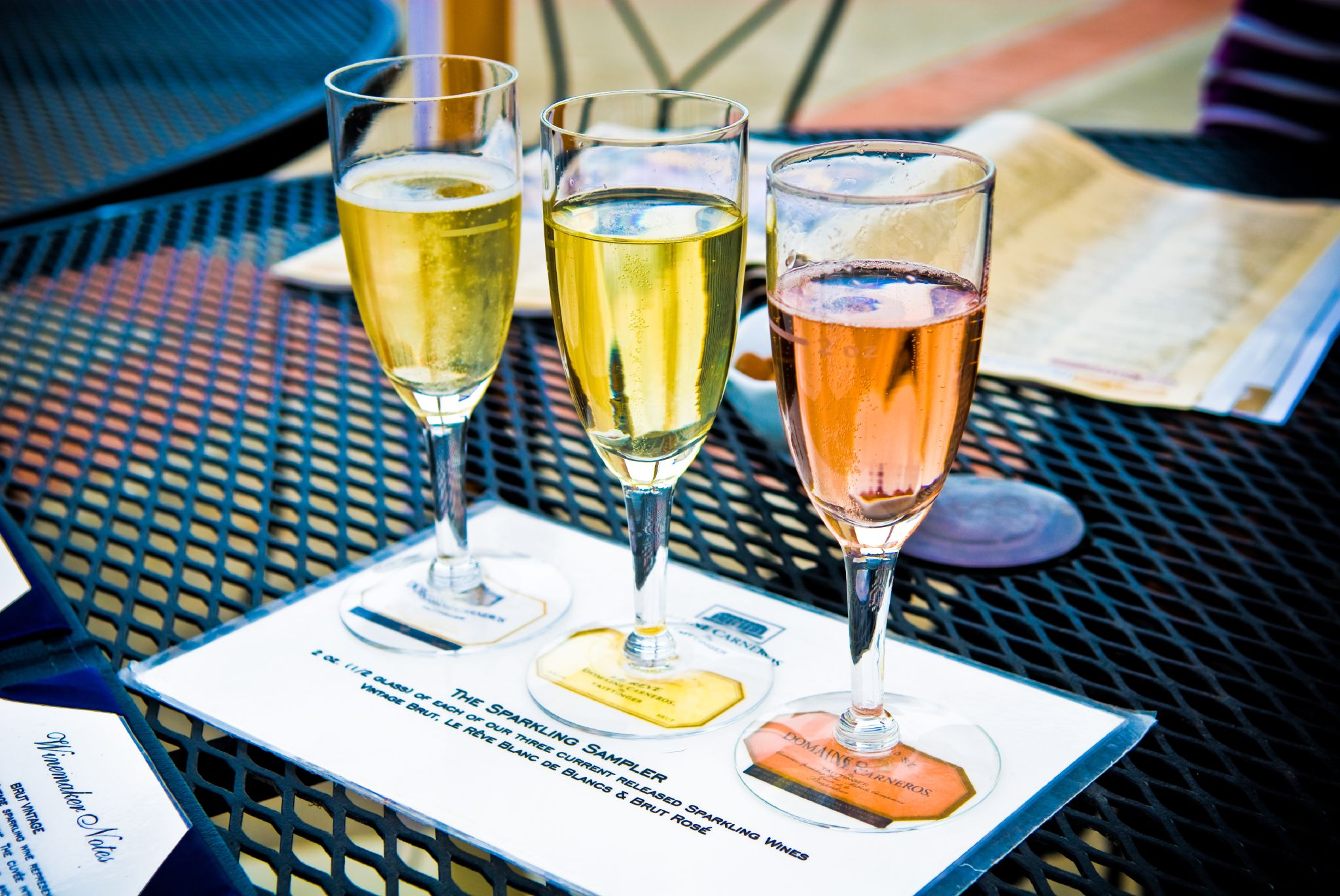
Sparkling wines produced by Domaine Carneros

California sparkling wine traces its roots to Sonoma in the 1880s with the founding of Korbel Champagne Cellars. The Korbel brothers made sparkling wine according to the méthode champenoise from Riesling, Chasselas, Muscatel and Traminer. Today most California sparkling wine is largely made from the same grapes used in Champagne: Chardonnay, Pinot noir and some Pinot Meunier. Some wineries will also use Pinot blanc, Chenin blanc and French Colombard. The premium quality producers still use the méthode champenoise (or traditional method) while some low cost producers, like Gallo's Andre brand or Constellation Brands' Cook's, will use the Charmat method.

The potential for quality sparkling wine has attracted Champagne houses to open up wineries in California. These include Moët et Chandon's Domaine Chandon California, Taittinger's Domaine Carneros and Louis Roederer's Roederer Estate. Despite being made with mostly the same grapes and with the same production techniques, California sparkling wines do not set out to be imitators of Champagne but rather to forge their own distinctive style. Instead of having the "biscuity", yeasty quality that distinguishes most high quality Champagnes, premium California sparkling wines show clarity of fruit flavors without being heavily "fruity". The optimal climate condition allows most sparkling wine producers to make a vintage dated wine every year while in Champagne this would only happen in exceptional years.

Since the wine renaissance of the 1960s, the quality of California's dessert and fortified wines have been dramatically improved. Beringer was one of the first to create a botrytized wine from Sauvignon blanc and Sémillon. Though unlike in Sauternes, Beringer's wine was made of grapes regularly harvested and then introduced at the winery to Botrytis cinerea spores created in a laboratory. Since then California winemakers in places like the Anderson Valley AVA have found vineyards where this noble rot can occur naturally on the grapes. The Anderson and Alexander Valley AVAs have also developed a reputation for their Late Harvest wines made from Riesling. Several French and Italian style Muscat wines are produced throughout California and are known for their intense aromatics and balanced acidity. The port-style wines in California are often made from the traditional Portuguese wine grapes like Touriga Nacional, Tinta Cão and Tinta Roriz. Some uniquely Californian styles are also made from Zinfandel and Petite Sirah.

== In popular culture ==
Due to its significance and influence in the U.S. market, California wine has been frequently referenced in various cultural productions:

=== Literature ===
- The Grapes of Wrath: John Steinbeck's 1939 novel evokes the hardships of the Great Depression faced by rural workers, with California as its backdrop, including mentions of the region's vineyards.

=== Film ===
- Sideways: This film highlights Santa Barbara County's wine region and significantly focuses on the finer attributes of its Pinot Noir.
- Bottle Shock: This movie portrays the emergence of Napa Valley's viticulture during the 1970s and Chateau Montelena's journey toward its historic victory at the 1976 Judgment of Paris revolutionizing the international wine industry.
- The Grapes of Wrath: A 1940 film adaptation of Steinbeck's novel.

=== Music ===
- "Sweet Virginia" by The Rolling Stones: Featured on the 1972 album Exile on Main St., the song by Mick Jagger and Keith Richards expresses gratitude for California's wine production.
- "Hotel California" by the Eagles: Released in 1976, the song references "pink champagne on ice", symbolizing California's luxurious and hedonistic atmosphere, tied to the state's wine culture.

== See also ==
- Agriculture in California
- California Association of Winegrape Growers
- California Department of Alcoholic Beverage Control
- Wine Country
- Wine Institute
