= Department of Viticulture and Enology (University of California, Davis) =

The Department of Viticulture and Enology is an academic department within the Agricultural Sciences Division at the College of Agricultural and Environmental Sciences at the University of California, Davis. The department offers undergraduate and graduate degrees in the areas of grape growing and wine making. Located just 45 minutes from Napa Wine Country, the department has strong connections with wine producers in California and elsewhere. The department has produced many of the notable winemakers of the California wine industry.

== History ==
The Department of Viticulture and Enology at UC Davis celebrated its 125th anniversary in 2005. Established in 1880 by mandate of the California Legislature, the purpose of the department was to establish a center of research to help the developing California wine industry. Originally located on the UC Berkeley campus, the department was closed in 1919 with the passage of prohibition into law. The department was re-established in 1935 on the Davis campus following the repeal of prohibition. Today the department includes a pilot winery and two research vineyards (one located on the main campus, and one located in the Napa valley). In 2001 Robert Mondavi donated $25 million to the College of Agricultural and Environmental Sciences for the establishment of the Robert Mondavi Institute for Wine and Food Science, which opened October 2008.

== See also ==
- Winkler vine
