= Vin de Savoie AOC =

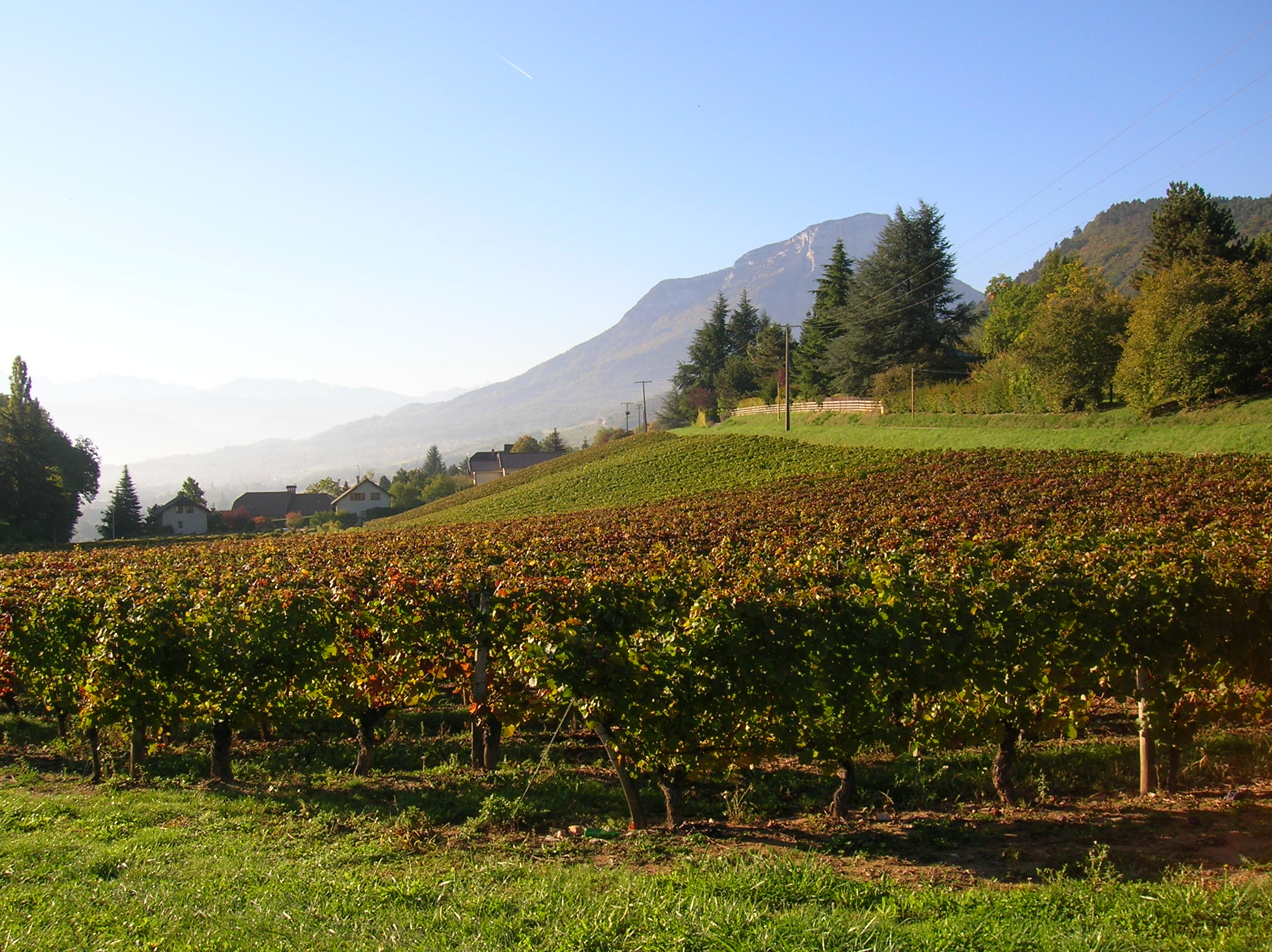
Vineyards around the commune of Saint-Baldoph in Savoie.

Vin de Savoie (French pronunciation: [vɛ̃ də savwa]) is an Appellation d'Origine Contrôlée (French, AOC) and Protected Designation of Origin (EU, PDO) for red and white wines in the Savoy wine region of France, which is located in the foothills of the Alps. The region is divided roughly into three distinct parts: the glacially sculpted terrain along the South shore of Lake Geneva, the hilly country near the northern end of Lac de Bourget, and the area bordering the Massif de Bauges South of Chambéry.

The wines are mostly white, made from grape varieties Chasselas, Jacquère, Altesse (also known as Roussette), Verdesse, Chardonnay and Roussanne grapes, although there are also some (relatively light) reds made from Mondeuse, Gamay noir and occasionally Pinot noir, and rosés made from Gamay, and some sparkling wines.

== Dénominations ==
Seventeen dénominations géographiques are authorized within the appellation:

- Abymes or Les Abymes (white wines);
- Apremont (white wines);
- Arbin (rouges);
- Ayze (sparkling white wines);
- Chautagne (white and red wines);
- Chignin (white and red wines);
- Chignin-Bergeron (white wines);
- Crépy (white wines);
- Cruet (white wines);
- Frangy (white and red wines);
- Jongieux (white and red wines);
- Marignan (white wines);
- Marin (white wines);
- Montmélian (white wines);
- Ripaille (white wines);
- Saint-jean-de-la-porte (red wines);
- Saint-jeoire-prieuré (white wines).

== See also ==
- French wine
- Savoy wine
