= Seyssel AOC =

Seyssel (French pronunciation: [sɛsɛl]) is an Appellation d'Origine Contrôlée (AOC) for white wine in the Savoy wine region of France. The wines are exclusively white (still or sparkling), made from the regional grape varieties Altesse and Molette. They are considered to be most suitable to be consumed young.

The AOC includes three communes: Seyssel and Corbonod in Ain, and Seyssel, Haute-Savoie.
