= Roussanne =

Variety of grape

- Grape (Vitis)
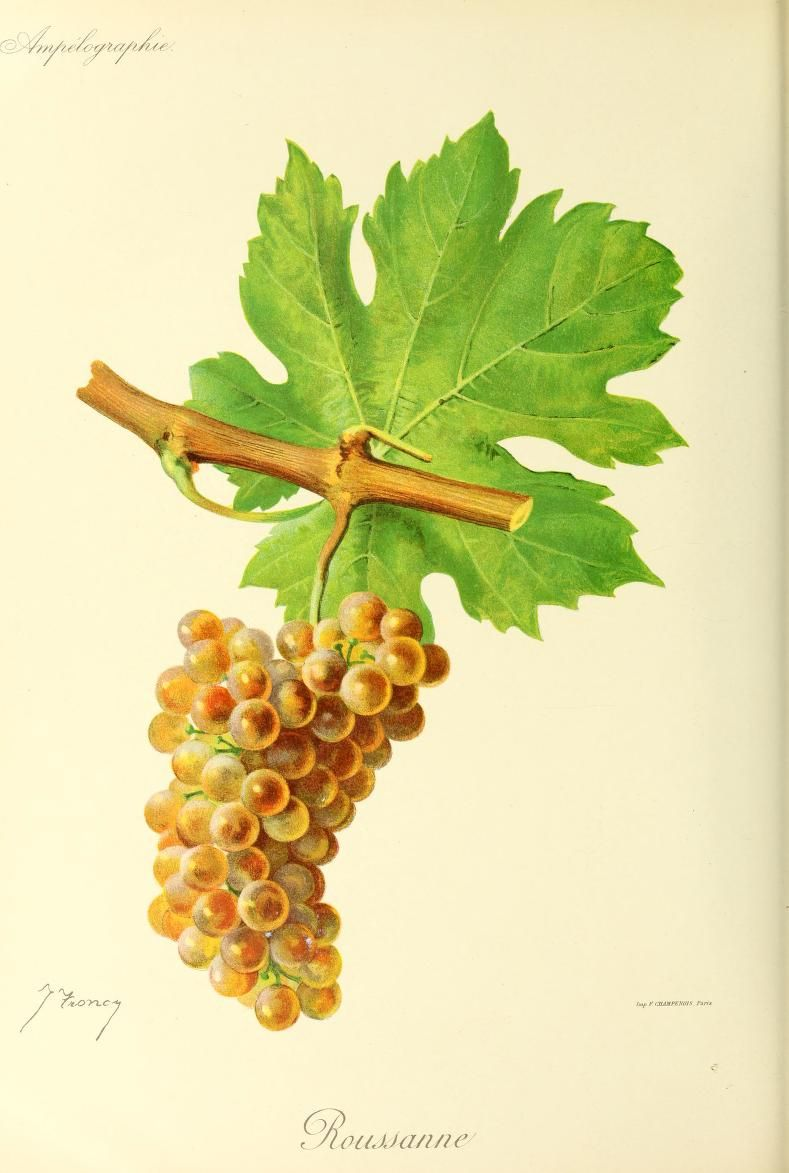
- Roussanne in Viala & Vermorel
- Color of berry skin: Blanc
- Species: Vitis vinifera
- Also called: Roussanne Blanc, Bergeron and other synonyms
- Origin: France
- Notable regions: Rhône
- Notable wines: Château Beaucastel Châteauneuf-du-Pape Blanc Vieilles Vignes
- VIVC number: 10258

Roussanne (French pronunciation: [ʁusan]) is a white wine grape grown originally in the Rhône wine region in France, where it is often blended with Marsanne. It is the only other white variety, besides Marsanne, allowed in the northern Rhône appellations of Crozes-Hermitage AOC, Hermitage AOC and Saint-Joseph AOC. In the southern Rhône appellation of Châteauneuf-du-Pape AOC it is one of six white grapes allowed, where it may be blended into red wines. Roussanne is also planted in various wine-growing regions of the New World, such as California, Washington, Texas, South Africa and Australia as well as European regions such as Crete, Tuscany and Spain.

The berries are distinguished by their russet color when ripe—roux is French for the reddish-brown color russet, and is probably the root for the variety's name. The aroma of Roussanne is often reminiscent of a flowery herbal tea. In warm climates, it produces wines of richness, with flavors of honey and pear, and full body. In cooler climates it is more floral and more delicate, with higher acidity. In many regions, it is a difficult variety to grow, with vulnerability to mildew, poor resistance to drought and wind, late and/or uneven ripening, and irregular yields.

== Viticulture and winemaking ==
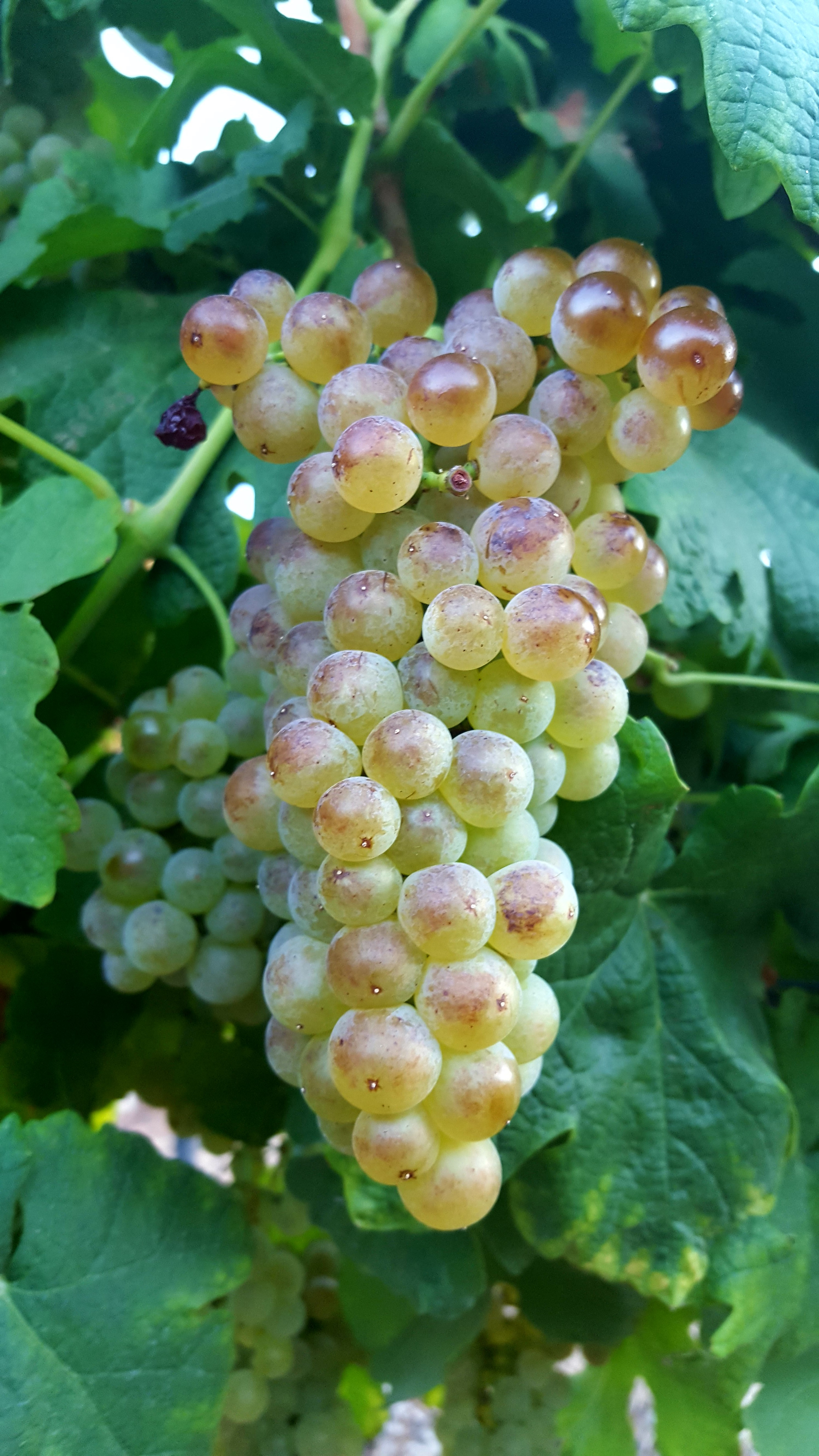
Roussanne grapes

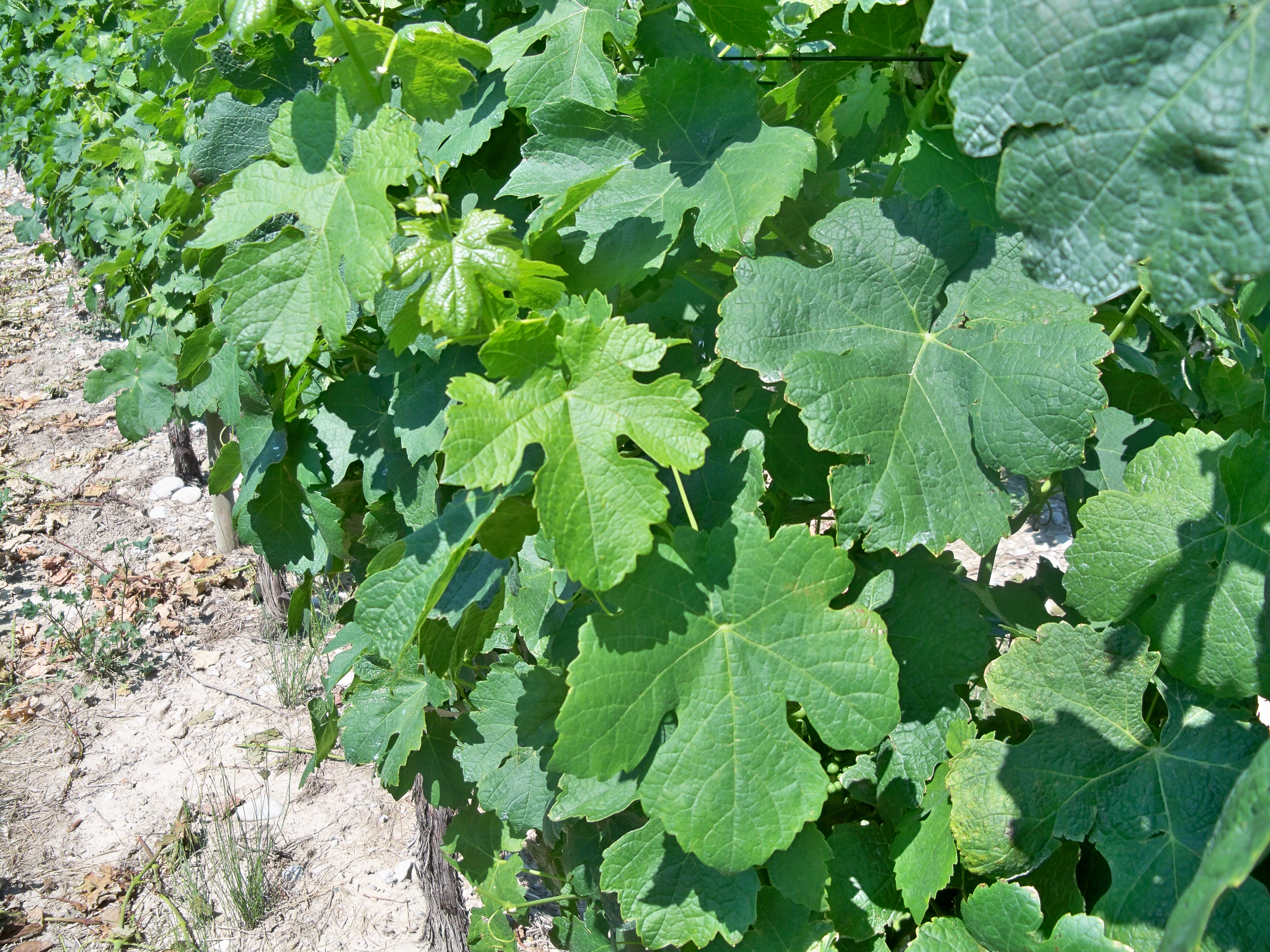
Leaves of Roussanne vines

The Roussanne vine ripens late and is characterized by its irregular yields that can decrease further due to poor wind resistance. The vine is also susceptible to powdery mildew and rot which makes it a difficult vine to cultivate. In recent years, the development of better clones has alleviated some of these difficulties. The grape prefers a long growing season but should be harvested before the potential alcohol reaches 14% which would result in the finished wine being out of balance. If picked too soon, the grape can suffer from high acidity. During winemaking, Roussanne is prone to oxidation without care being taken by the winemaker. The wine can benefit from a controlled use of oak. In blends, Roussanne adds aromatics, elegance and acidity with the potential to age and further develop in the bottle.

== Wine regions ==
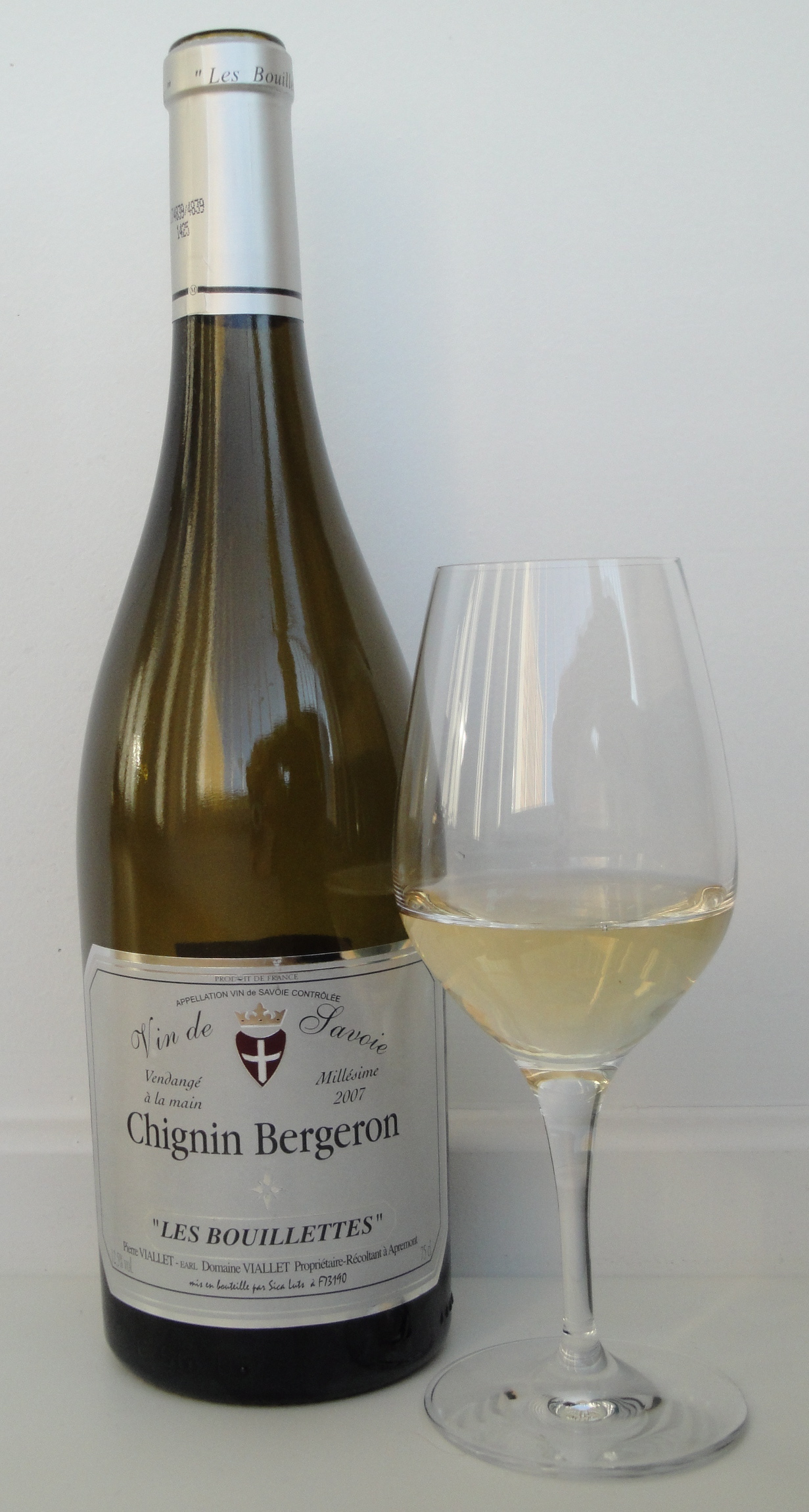
A Savoy wine produced from 100% Roussanne. Unlike most French AOC wines, the variety is mentioned on the front label, although using the local synonym of Bergeron.

It is likely that Roussanne originated in the northern Rhône where it is today an important component in the wines of Crozes-Hermitage, Hermitage, Saint-Joseph and the Saint-Péray AOC where it is used for both still and sparkling wine production. In recent years plantings of Roussanne have declined as Marsanne gains more of a foothold in the northern Rhône due to its high productivity and ease of cultivation. In the southern Rhône, Roussanne is a primary component in the white wines of Châteauneuf-du-Pape where it can comprise as much as 80–100% of the wine. It can also be found in some white wines from the Côtes du Rhône AOC. Outside of the Rhône, the Roussanne is grown in Provence and the Languedoc-Roussillon région where it is sometimes blended with Chardonnay, Marsanne and Vermentino in some vin de pays. In Savoie, the grape is known as Bergeron where it produces highly aromatic wines in Chignin.

Outside France it is grown in the Italian wine regions of Liguria and Tuscany where it is a permitted grape in Montecarlo bianco. In Australia, it was believed to have been brought to the continent to be blended with Shiraz. Documents dating as far back as 1882 have noted the presence of Roussanne plantings in Victoria. Today it is used both as a blending grape and as a varietal wine. In California, it is widely planted in the Central Coast AVA and the northern region of Yuba County. It has also recently been grown in the northern Golan Heights and produced as a wine in Israel. Along with other Rhône varieties, it is increasingly grown in South Africa.

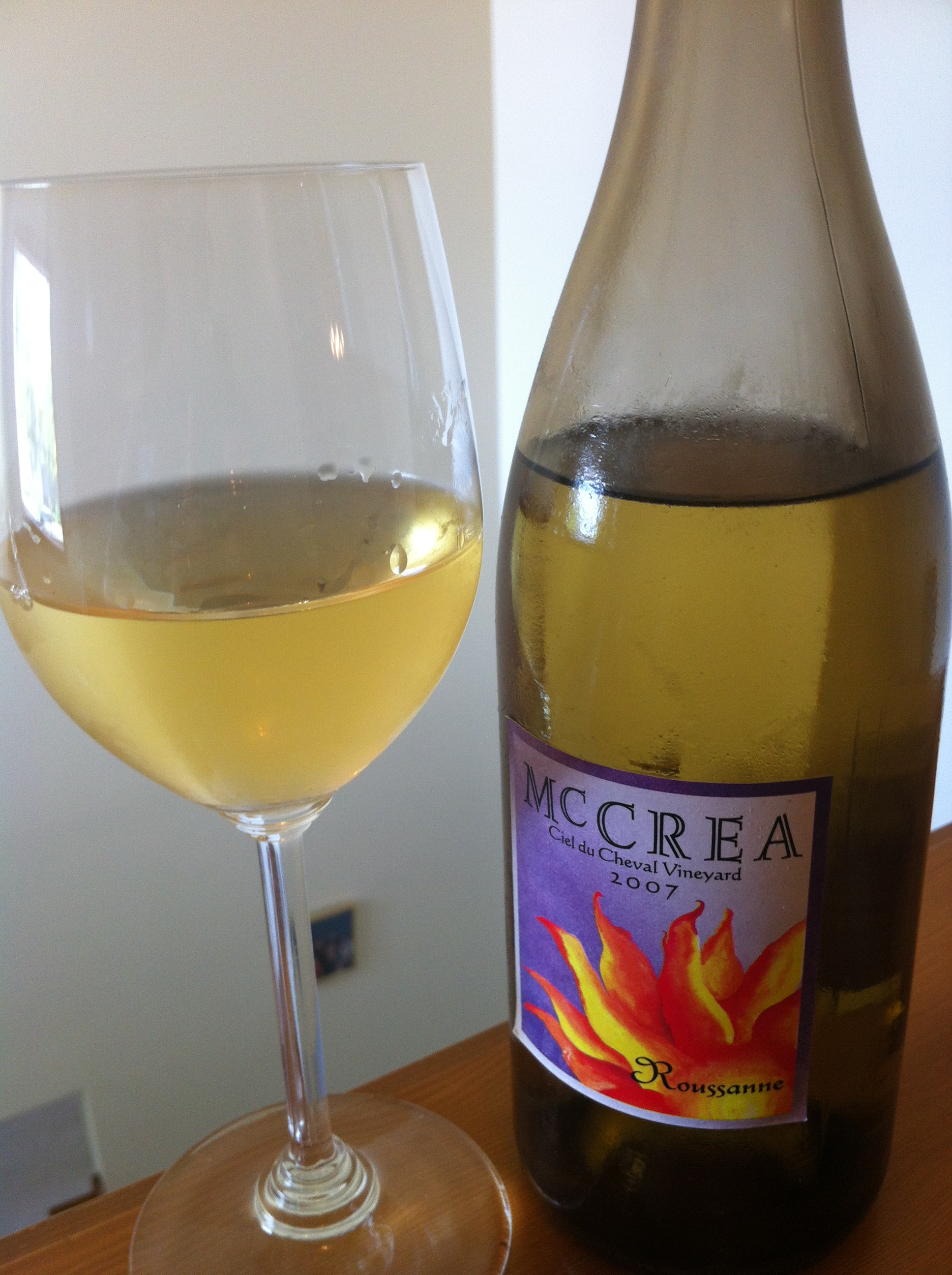
Roussanne from the Ciel du Cheval vineyard in the Red Mountain AVA of Washington State.

In Washington State, the first experimental plantings of Roussanne were planted by White Heron Cellars in 1990. In recent years, plantings have increased as more Washington winemakers experiment with Rhone varietals with grapes from Ciel du Cheval, Alder Ridge and Destiny Ridge. Washington Roussanne is often blended with Viognier and is characterized by its fruit salad profile of notes that range from apple, lime, peach and citrus to cream and honey. The Texas High Plains is proving to be well suited for growing high quality Roussanne. In New Jersey, Unionville Vineyards grows Roussanne, Marsanne, and other Rhone varieties.

== California Roussanne/Viognier controversy ==
In the 1980s, California winemaker Randall Grahm of Bonny Doon Vineyard smuggled cuttings of Roussanne that he reportedly got from a vineyard in Châteauneuf-du-Pape. Under California regulations, vines from outside the state are quarantined for a lengthy period which includes inspection for grape diseases and ampelographical identification at University of California, Davis. Grahm imported his cuttings in his suitcase and planted them at his vineyard in the Santa Cruz Mountains where he began making a Rhone style blend with Marsanne. In 1994, Grahm sold some of his Roussanne cuttings to Sonoma Grapevine, one of the largest nurseries in the state, who began to propagate the vines and sell them to wineries and other nurseries which spread these Roussanne vines across the state. One of the wineries that bought these cuttings was the California cult winery, Caymus Vineyards, who planted them in their Monterey vineyards. In 1998, John Alban of Alban Vineyards was visiting Caymus and noted that the Roussanne plantings looked more like Viognier than Roussanne. Samples were sent for DNA analysis and the result proved that the plantings were indeed Viognier as were all the vines that came from Grahm's original "Roussanne" vineyard.

== Wines ==
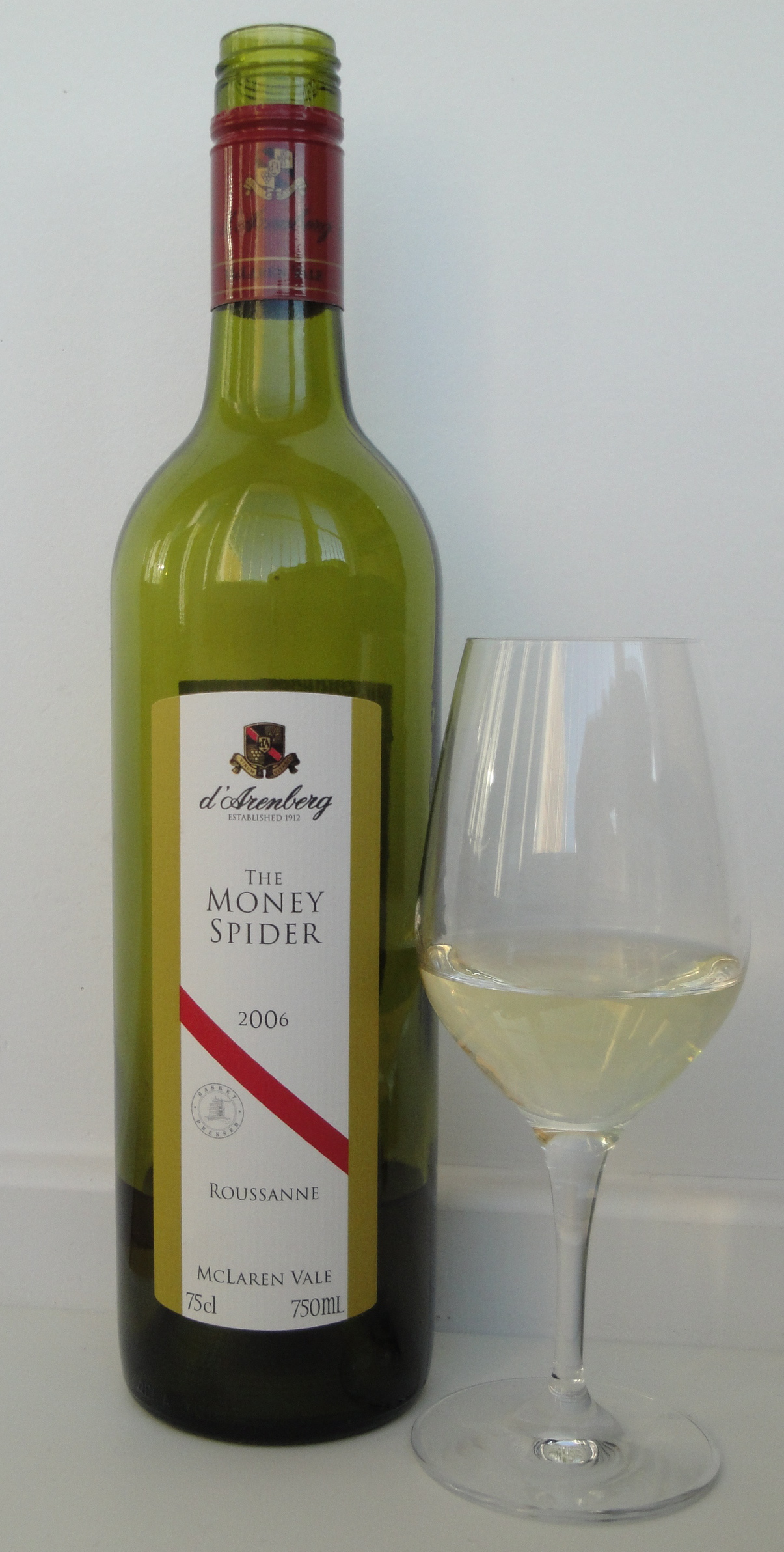
A varietal Roussanne from d'Arenberg in Australia.

Wines made from Roussanne are characterized by their intense aromatics which can include notes of herbal tea. In its youth it shows more floral, herbal and fruit notes, such as pear, which become more nutty as the wine ages. Roussanne from the Savoie region is marked by pepper and herbal notes. Wine expert Oz Clarke notes that Roussanne wine and Roussanne dominated blends can drink very well in the first 3 to 4 years of their youth before entering a "dumb phase" where the wine is closed aromatically until the wine reaches 7 or 8 years when it develops more complexity and depth.

== Synonyms and relationship to other grapes ==
Synonyms include Barbin, Bergeron (in particular in the Savoie region), Courtoisie, Fromental, Fromental jaune, Fromenteal, Fromenteau, Greffon, Greffou, Martin Cot, Petite Rousette, Picotin blanc, Plant de Seyssel, Rabellot, Rabelot, Ramoulette, Rebellot, Rebolot, Remoulette, Roussane, Roussane blanc, Roussanne blanc, Roussette, Rusan Belyi, Rusan Blan.

There are similarly named grapes that are unrelated to Roussanne—most notably the pink-skinned Roussanne du Var grown in Provence and the Roussette found in Savoie, which is also known as Altesse.
