= Saint-Jeoire-Prieuré =

French commune in the Auvergne-Rhône-Alpes region

Saint-Jeoire-Prieuré Sè Zhouère (Savoyard)
- Commune
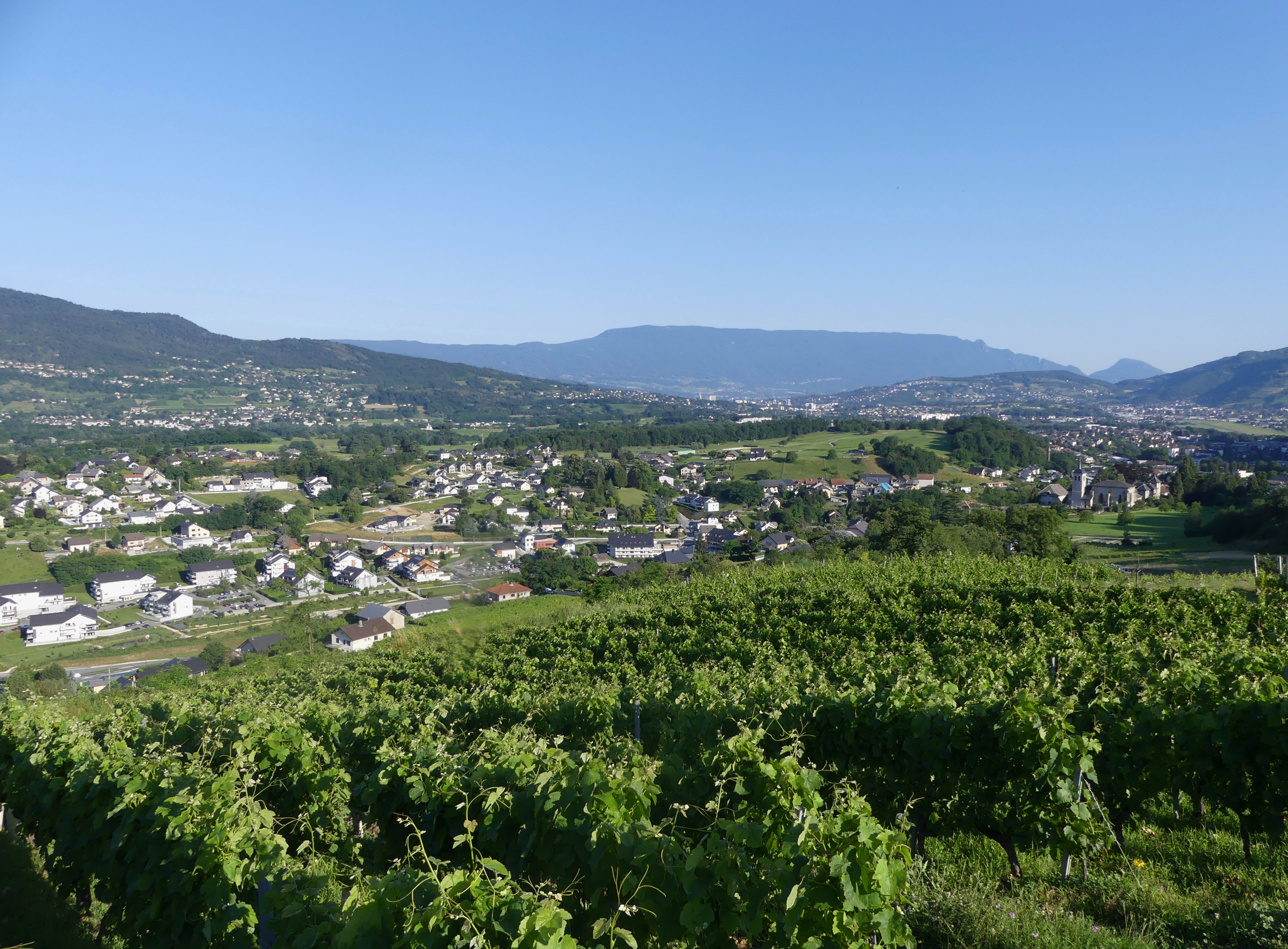
- A view of Saint-Jeoire-Prieuré from the vineyards
- Location of Saint-Jeoire-Prieuré
- Location within France Location within Auvergne-Rhône-Alpes
- Coordinates: 45°32′08″N 5°59′39″E
- Country: France
- Region: Auvergne-Rhône-Alpes
- Department: Savoie
- Arrondissement: Chambéry
- Canton: La Ravoire
- Intercommunality: Grand Chambéry

Government
  - Mayor (2020–2026): Jean-Marc Léoutre
- Area^{1}: 5.34 km^{2} (2.06 sq mi)
- Highest elevation: 901 m (2,956 ft)
- Lowest elevation: 294 m (965 ft)
- Population (2023): 1,999
  - Density: 374/km^{2} (970/sq mi)
- Time zone: UTC+01:00 (CET)
  - Summer (DST): UTC+02:00 (CEST)
- INSEE/Postal code: 73249 /73190
- Website: saintjeoireprieure.fr
- ^{1} French Land Register data, which excludes lakes, ponds, glaciers > 1 km^{2} (0.386 sq mi or 247 acres) and river estuaries.

Saint-Jeoire-Prieuré (French pronunciation: [sɛ̃ ʒwaʁ pʁijœʁe]; Savoyard: Sè Zhouère) is a commune in the Savoie department in the Auvergne-Rhône-Alpes region of south-eastern France. It is part of the Canton of La Ravoire in the Arrondissement of Chambéry and included in the Grand Chambéry agglomeration community (previously Chambéry Métropole - Cœur des Bauges).

== Geography ==
=== Location ===
Saint-Jeoire-Prieuré is located less than ten kilometres (about six miles) southeast of the city of Chambéry and 43 kilometres (27 mi) northeast of the city of Grenoble (as the crow flies). Neighboring municipalities of the commune are Challes-les-Eaux and Curienne to the north, Chignin to the east, and Myans to the south and west. Saint-Jeoire-Prieuré and its neighboring municipalities together form the outer suburb of Chambéry

=== Topography ===
Saint-Jeoire-Prieuré has an area of 534 km^{2} (206 mi^{2}) and extends into the southwest edge of the Bauges, a limestone massif in the northern French Prealps. The main part of the municipality is situated in the Cluse de Chambéry, the glacial valley which separates the Bauges and the Chartreuse Mountains. The administrative centre is located on the foothills, at less than 500 metres (1,600 ft) above sea level. The lowest point sits at 294 metres (965 ft), the level of the cluse. In the eastern part of the commune, a mountain pass called the Trouée des Marches ('Gap of the Marches') allows connection by road to the municipalities located there. Elevation extends over 800 metres (2,600 ft) above sea level in this area and reaches 901 metres (2,956 ft) at the height of the massif.

The commune does not contain any significant bodies of water, aside from streams and rivulets.

=== Land use ===
Over half of the land in Saint-Jeoire-Prieuré (57.9%) comprises agricultural areas, with an additional 22.3% classified as hardwood forests. Vineyards (10.3%) and discontinuous urban areas (9.5%) account for the remaining land.

In addition to the village center on the valley floor, Saint-Jeoire-Prieuré also includes the hamlet of La Boisserette (440 m; 1,440 ft) in a flute in the foothills of the Bauges.

== History ==
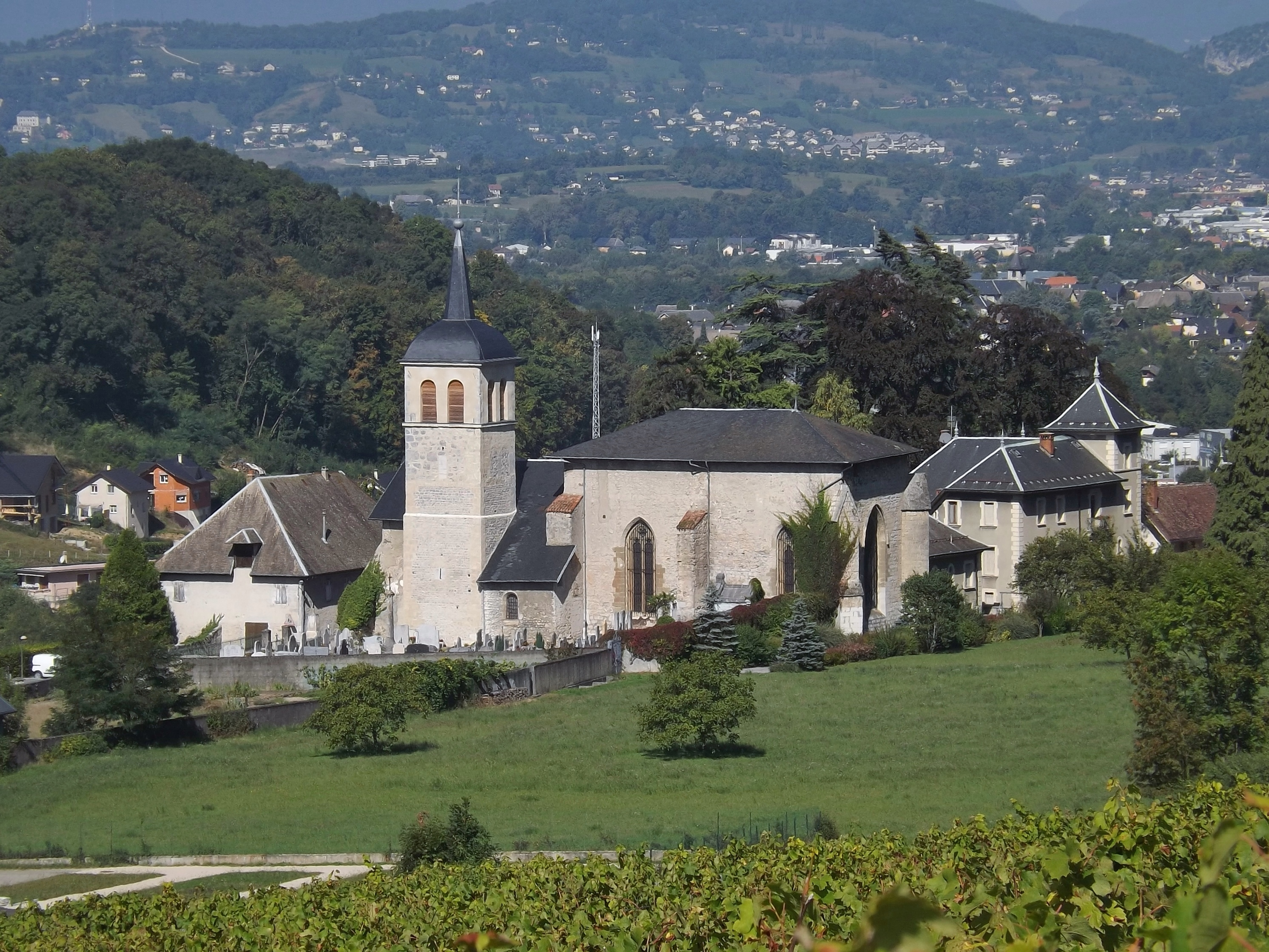
The 14th century church of Saint-Georges du Prieuré.

The first documented reference to a settlement in what is now Saint-Jeoire-Prieuré can be traced to around 1100 CE, under the Latin name Ecclesia Sancti Georgii (French: Paroisse de Saint-Georges; 'Parish of Saint George'). In 1110 CE, Bishop Hugues de Grenoble founded a priory of the Canons Regular of St. Augustine at Saint-Georges, to which the churches and parishes of Saint-Georges, Saint Pierre in Chignin, Saint Vincent in Triviers (today Challes-les-Eaux), Saint Jean-Baptiste in Barby and Saint Maurice in Curienne were initially assigned.

Two centuries later, the variant Jeoire, latinized Jourius, was popularized in the Savoy and Piedmont regains and was adopted as the standard name used by the priory. In the following centuries, four more parishes were added. The priory was one of the first to be integrated into the Sainte Maison de Thonon in 1599, an instrument of counter-reformation in the Chablais created by Pope Clement VIII. The place name Prieuré was added to the commune name in 1901.

The priory church of Saint-Georges du Prieuré is the only construct of the former priory still standing. The church was built during the last quarter of the 14th century into the 15th century, replacing the original Romanesque church from 1110 CE. Two bays from the original church were reused in the later building. The church and its inventory were designated as monument historique in 1956, recognizing its importance to the architectural, historical, and cultural heritage of France.

== See also ==
- Communes of the Savoie department
