= Crépy =

Crépy may refer to:

- Crépy, Aisne, a commune of France in the Aisne département
- Crépy, Pas-de-Calais, a commune of France in the Pas-de-Calais département
- Crépy-en-Valois, a commune of France in the Oise département
- Crépy AOC, a French wine appellation in the Savoy wine region
- Simon de Crépy, 11th-century French nobleman
- Etienne Louis Crepy, 18th-century French cartographer
