= Seyssel =

Seyssel is the name of two communes in France:

- Seyssel, Ain, in the Ain département
- Seyssel, Haute-Savoie, in the Haute-Savoie département

Seyssel may also refer to:

- Seyssel AOC, a wine AOC
- Claude de Seyssel, a Savoyard jurist and humanist
- Maximilian Seyssel d’Aix (1776–1855), Bavarian Lieutenant General
