= Savoy wine =

Wine region in France

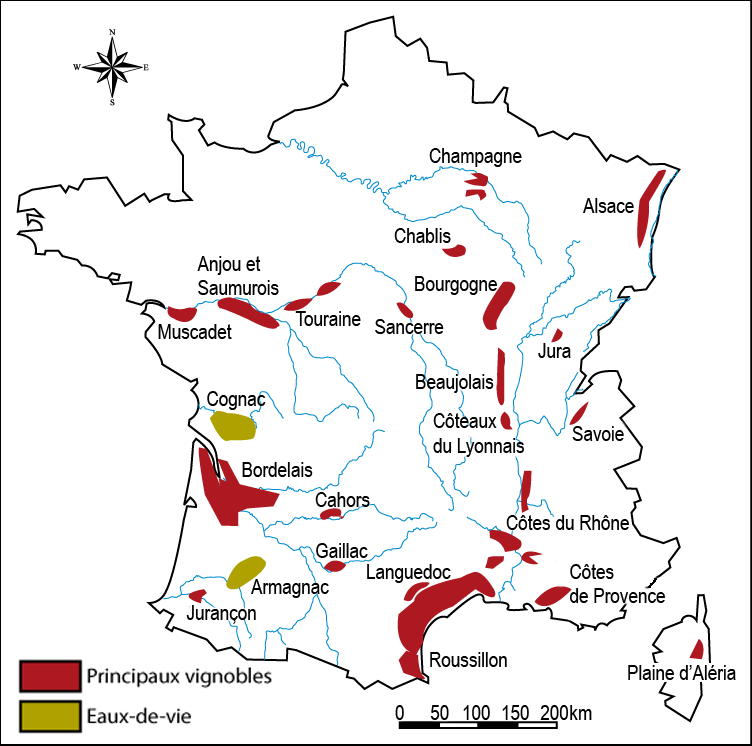
Wine region map

Savoy (French: Savoie) is a wine region situated in the Savoy region in eastern France, and is sometimes referred to as the country of the Allobroges. It is the only alpine wine region in France, and is known for grape varieties rarely grown elsewhere, including Jacquère, Roussanne, Altesse (also known as Roussette) and Gringet for white wines, and Mondeuse for reds.

The Savoyard appellations (labels) are distributed through four departments: Haute-Savoie, Ain, Isère and Savoie. Crépy near Lake Geneva and Seyssel in the Ain are easy to locate. But wines labelled Roussette de Savoie and Vin de Savoie can come from anywhere in the wine growing area, unless the label display the name of a village in addition to the appellation. There are four Roussette villages (Frangy, Monthoux, Marestel and Monterminod) and seventeen "Vin de Savoie" villages, the best known being Apremont, Chignin, Chautagne and Arbin.

== AOC wines ==
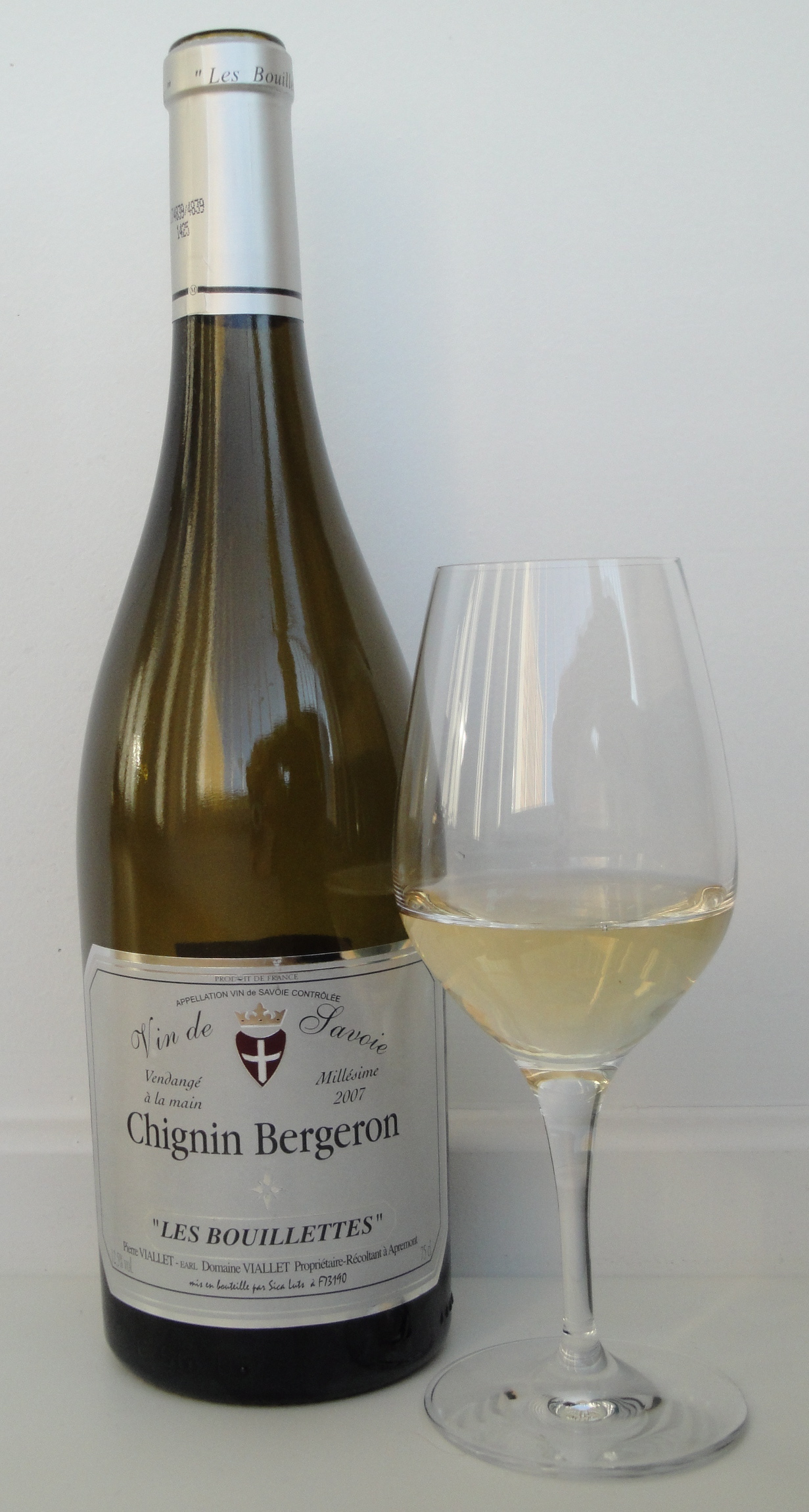
A Chignin Bergeron wine.

- Chignin Bergeron – Chignin-Bergeron cru of the Vin de Savoie appellation in the Savoy region of eastern France. The name is taken from the village of Chignin. Bergeron is the local name of the Roussanne grape variety, from which Chignin-Bergeron wines are made. To be called "Chignin-Bergeron," the grapes must come from vineyards in the Francin, Montmelian and Chignin communes.
- Chignin – Chignin is another cru of the Vin de Savoie appellation also named after the village of Chignin. These white wines are made from Jacquere grapes and are dry and light. They are less well known than the other Roussanne white wines, sold as Chignin-Bergeron.
- Roussette de Savoie Monterminod – One of the four named crus of the Roussette de Savoie appellation, Monterminod is located above the village of Saint-Alban-Leysse in Savoy. The name "Monterminod" is permitted as part of the appellation title. Monterminod and the other three Roussette de Savoie crus are each distinct in character. Monterminod is the most southerly, with Frangy 30 miles (48 km) north. Monthoux and Marestel are roughly halfway in between. The sunny exposure of the steep, rapidly drained south-facing slope give Monterminod an advantage in the cool, alpine climate. Their elevation makes them less susceptible to low-lying frosts and they are sheltered from extreme weather by the surrounding peaks rising to more than 4000 ft (1220 m). The wines of Monterminod and the other three crus are subject to stringent production conditions, including lower maximum yield and higher minimum alcohol levels than basic Roussette de Savoie wines.

== Other grapes and wines ==
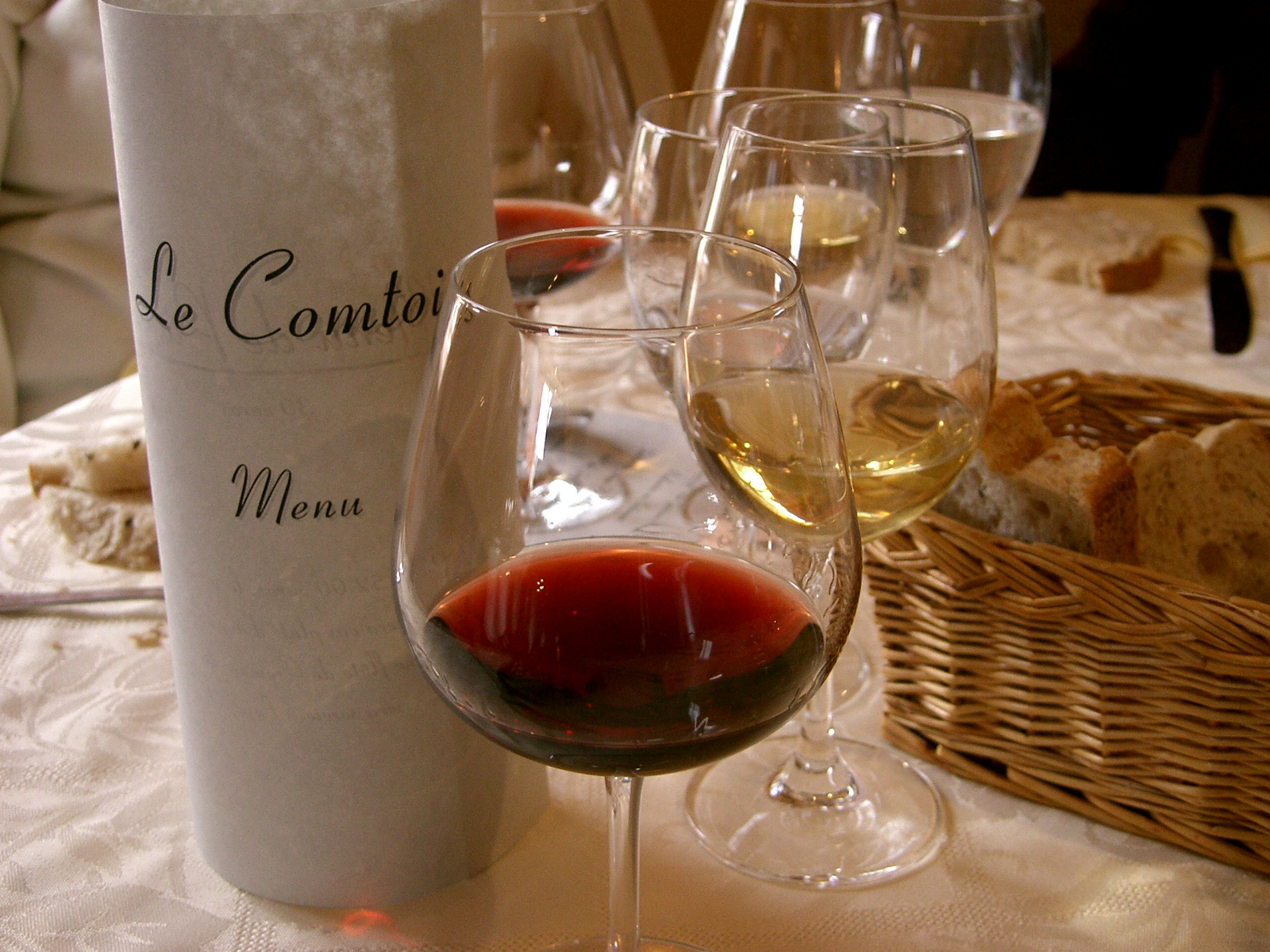
Wines from Savoy

- Altesse – another white grape of the Savoie and neighboring Bugey, also known as Roussette.
- Pinot gris – Grape variety for white wine, muted of the Pinot noir. The skin of this grape has a color that can vary from almost black to white and from pale blue to pink. The color of the wine can also have a hint of pink.
- Mondeuse – Mondeuse is a red wine with bluish tones.
- Mondeuse d’Arbin – Mondeuse d’Arbin is also a red wine from Mondeuse with intense red deep color.
- Pinot noir – Pinot is a wine with a high alcohol content (12 to 13°) and a scarlet raisin color.
