= Château de Monterminod =

Medieval castle in Savoy, France

Coordinates: 45.5829°N 5.9649°E

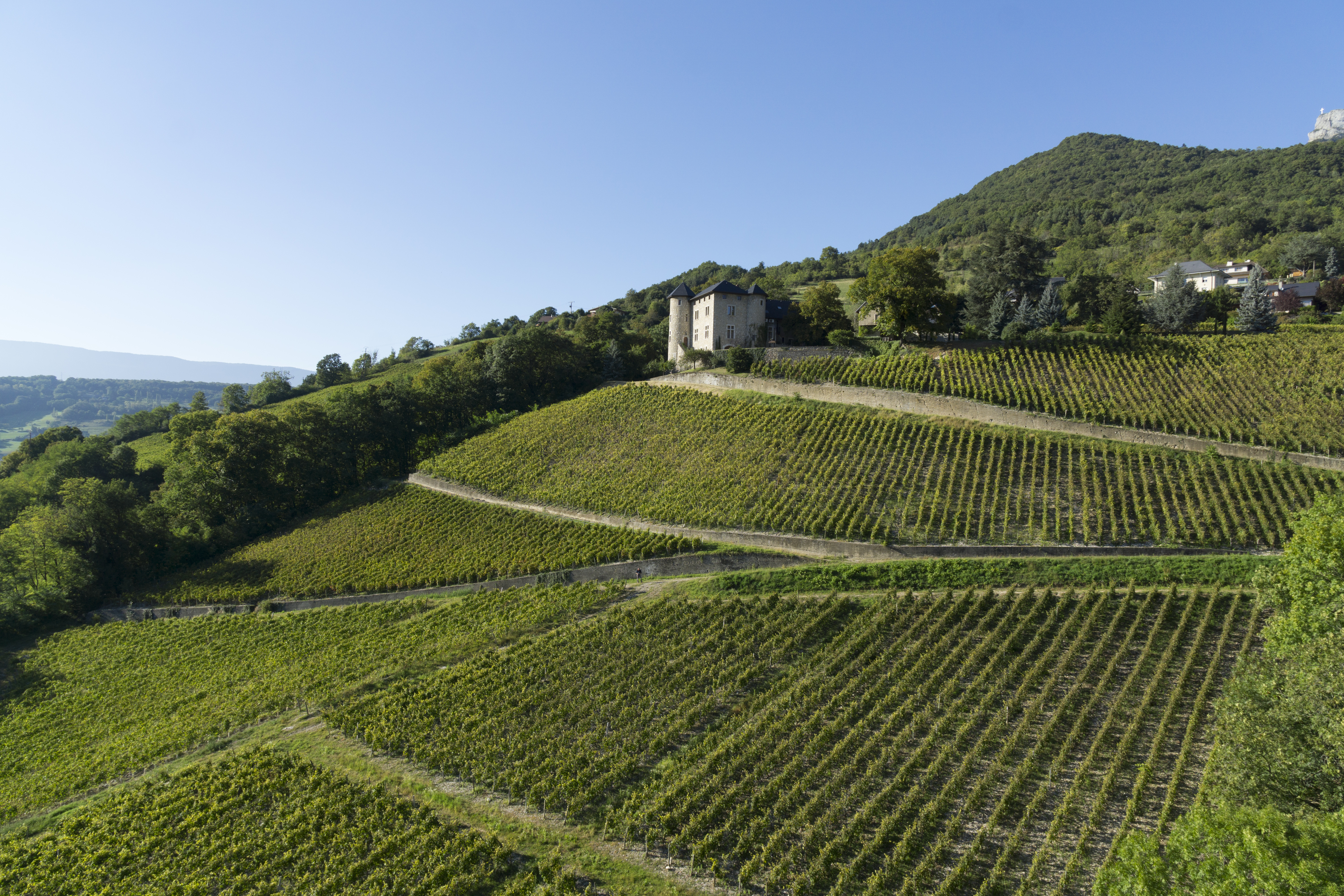
Chateau de Monterminod

The Chateau de Monterminod is a medieval castle located in the city of Saint-Alban-Leysse in the Savoy region of France, approximately 130 kilometres (80 mi) west of Geneva, Switzerland. The chateau dominates the "hameau du Villaret", and its location on top of a hill makes it highly noticeable from kilometres away.

The chateau was strategically located within a system of defense for the region. Indeed, in case of attack, the Chateau of Chambéry would send signals from the main tower to the Chateau de Monterminod, which would then signal another chateau, and so forth until the message reached the Maurienne valley. This system enabled the vassals from the area to prepare for any attack and provide help. The vineyard that surrounds the Chateau de Monterminod was created following an 11th-century law by Odilo of Cluny, the archbishop of the Cluny Abbey. The vineyard already surrounded the medieval castle and has not changed up to this day. The very first public document that mentions the vineyard is a charter signed by Humbert aux Blanches Mains between 1014 and 1042 for the donation by the knight Aymon de Pierre Forte of the vineyard referred to as Mount Erminod (in French "Mont Erminod" later became "Monterminod") to Saint-Odilon, Abbey of Cluny.

From the 13th to the 15th centuries, the chateau was owned by the Crochet family, a noble family whose ties go back to the Harveys. Around that time, the Princess Anne of Cyprus, called "the most beautiful princess in the world", who became Duchess of Savoie when she married her husband, gave her name to the grape variety that she brought with her from Paris, the cépage Altesse.

The Chateau de Monterminod traded hands multiple times between the 15th and 20th centuries until 1955, when Joseph Girard, a noted wine trader in the region, acquired the property. Since then, the property has been owned and taken care of by the same family.
