= Bugey wine =

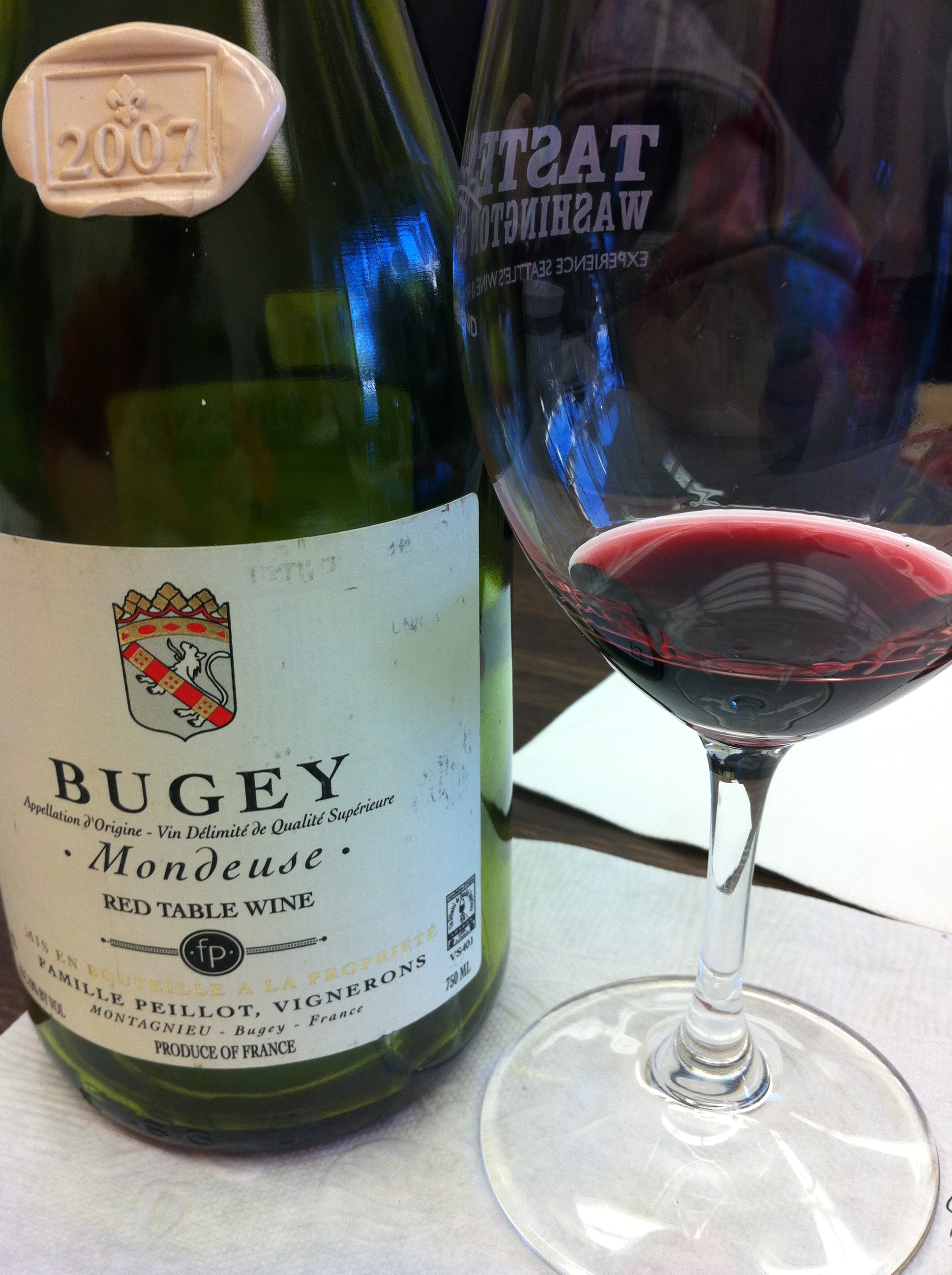
A Mondeuse noire wine from 2007 when Bugey was a Vin Délimité de Qualité Supérieure (VDQS) classified wine.

Bugey wine (French pronunciation: [byʒɛ]) is produced in the Bugey region in the Ain département of France, under the two VDQS designations Bugey and Roussette du Bugey. On May 28, 2009, INAO gave its final approval for the elevation of Bugey and Roussette du Bugey to Appellation d'origine contrôlée (AOC) status.

A high proportion of Bugey wine is white, but white, rosé, red and sparkling wines are all produced in Bugey. Bugey wine made from the aromatic white variety Altesse, locally called Roussette, are among the more noted from the area.

Vineyards of the two Bugey appellations cover around 500 hectares (1,200 acres) spread over 67 communes in the department of Ain.

== Allowed designations ==
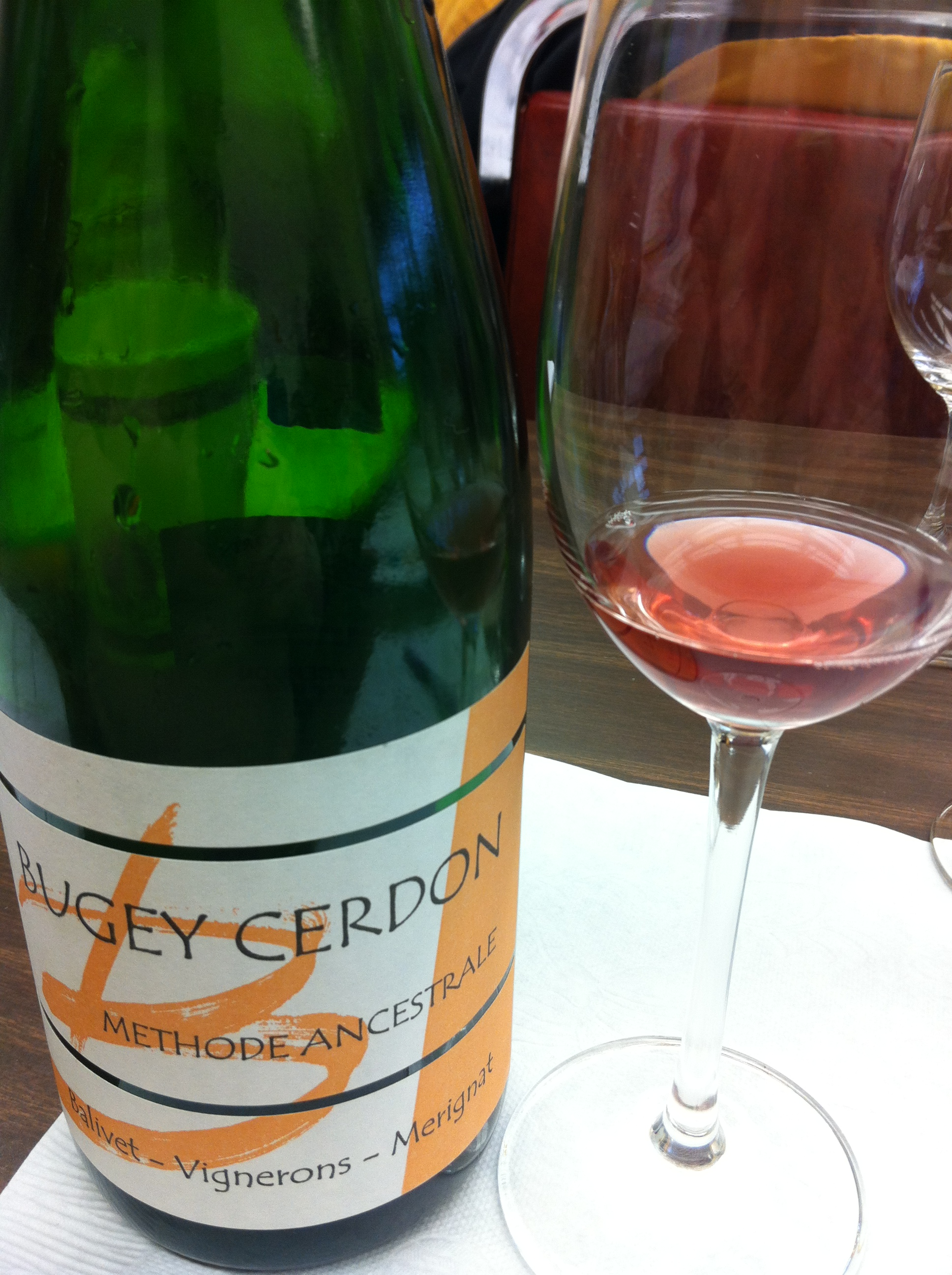
A sparkling rose from Bugey-Cerdon.

Under the present VDQS regulations, Bugey may carry the following designations:

- Bugey - white, rosé or red
- Bugey, plus a mention of geographical origin:
  - Manicle, a lieu dit in Cheignieu-la-Balme - white or red
  - Montagnieu - red
- Bugey mousseux or pétillant (sparkling with different amount of bubbles) - white or rosé
- Bugey mousseux or pétillant, plus a mention of geographical origin:
  - Cerdon - rosé
  - Montagnieu - white
- Roussette du Bugey - white
- Roussette du Bugey, plus a mention of geographical origin:
  - Montagnieu - white
  - Virieu le Grand - white

== Grape varieties ==
=== White wines ===
White Bugey, with the exception of white Bugey-Manicle, must contain at least 50% Chardonnay, and may furthermore contain Aligoté, Altesse, Jacquère, Pinot gris and Mondeuse blanche as accessory grapes. Bugey-Manicle must be 100% Chardonnay.

Roussette de Bugey, which only exists as a white wine, must contain at least 50% Altesse, which is locally known under the name Roussette. Chardonnay is allowed as an accessory grape until the 2008 vintage, but from the 2009 vintage all Roussette de Bugey must be 100% Altesse. Roussette de Bugey with a mention of geographical origin is already required to be made from only Altesse grapes.

=== Rosé wines ===
For rosé Bugey, a minimum of 50% of Gamay and Pinot noir, alone or together must be used. Mondeuse noire, Pinot gris and Poulsard are allowed as accessory grapes.

=== Red wines ===
Red Bugey can contain Gamay, Pinot noir or Mondeuse noire, with the exception of red Bugey-Manicle that can only contain Pinot noir, and red Bugey-Montagnieu that can only contain Mondeuse noire.

=== Sparkling wines ===
White sparkling Bugey, with the exception of Bugey-Montagnieu, must contain a minimum of 70% of Chardonnay, Jacquère and Molette. The following grapes are allowed as accessory grapes: Aligoté, Altesse, Mondeuse blanche, Pinot gris, Gamay, Pinot noir, Mondeuse noire and Poulsard. White sparkling Bugey-Montagnieu must contain a minimum of 70% of Altesse, Chardonnay and Mondeuse noire, with Jacquère, Pinot noir, Gamay and Molette allowed as accessory grapes.

Rosé sparkling Bugey follows the same rules as still Bugey rosé, with the exception of rosé sparkling Bugey-Cerdon, which must be made either from 100% Gamay or a blend of Gamay and Poulsard.

== Classification and previous naming ==
The wines of Bugey have been classified as VDQS wines since 1958, initially under the name Vin du Bugey. Before the 2004 change to the present VDQS names, all of the following names in combination with additional designations were possible for Bugey wines:

- Mousseux du Bugey
- Pétillant du Bugey
- Roussette du Bugey
- Roussette du Bugey, plus the mention of one of the following crus: Anglefort, Arbignieu, Chanay, Lagnieu, Montagnieu, Virieu-le-Grand.
- Vin du Bugey, or Bugey
- Vin du Bugey, or Bugey, plus the mention of one of the following crus: Virieu-le-Grand, Montagnieu, Manicle, Machuraz, Cerdon
- Vin du Bugey-Cerdon pétillant
- Vin du Bugey-Cerdon mousseux
- Vin du Bugey mousseux
- Vin du Bugey pétillant

Bugey has wished to achieve full Appellation d'origine contrôlée (AOC) status for some time. As of April 2008, INAO published draft AOC regulations for Bugey and Roussette du Bugey as part of the scrutiny process. By May 28, 2009, the scrutiny process was finished and INAO gave its approval, with official publication of AOC rules to follow.

== Regional affiliation ==
Bugey is located outside any of the major French wine regions, and is therefore usually counted as a small wine-making area of its own. Since the closest vineyards of Bugey and Savoy are within a few kilometers of another, it is not surprising that Bugey sometimes is thought to be a part of the Savoy wine region. However, it was historically a part of Burgundy and is located in another department (Ain) than Savoy.
