= Chambéry Aerodrome =

Airport in Savoie, France

Chambéry Aerodrome Aérodrome de Chambéry
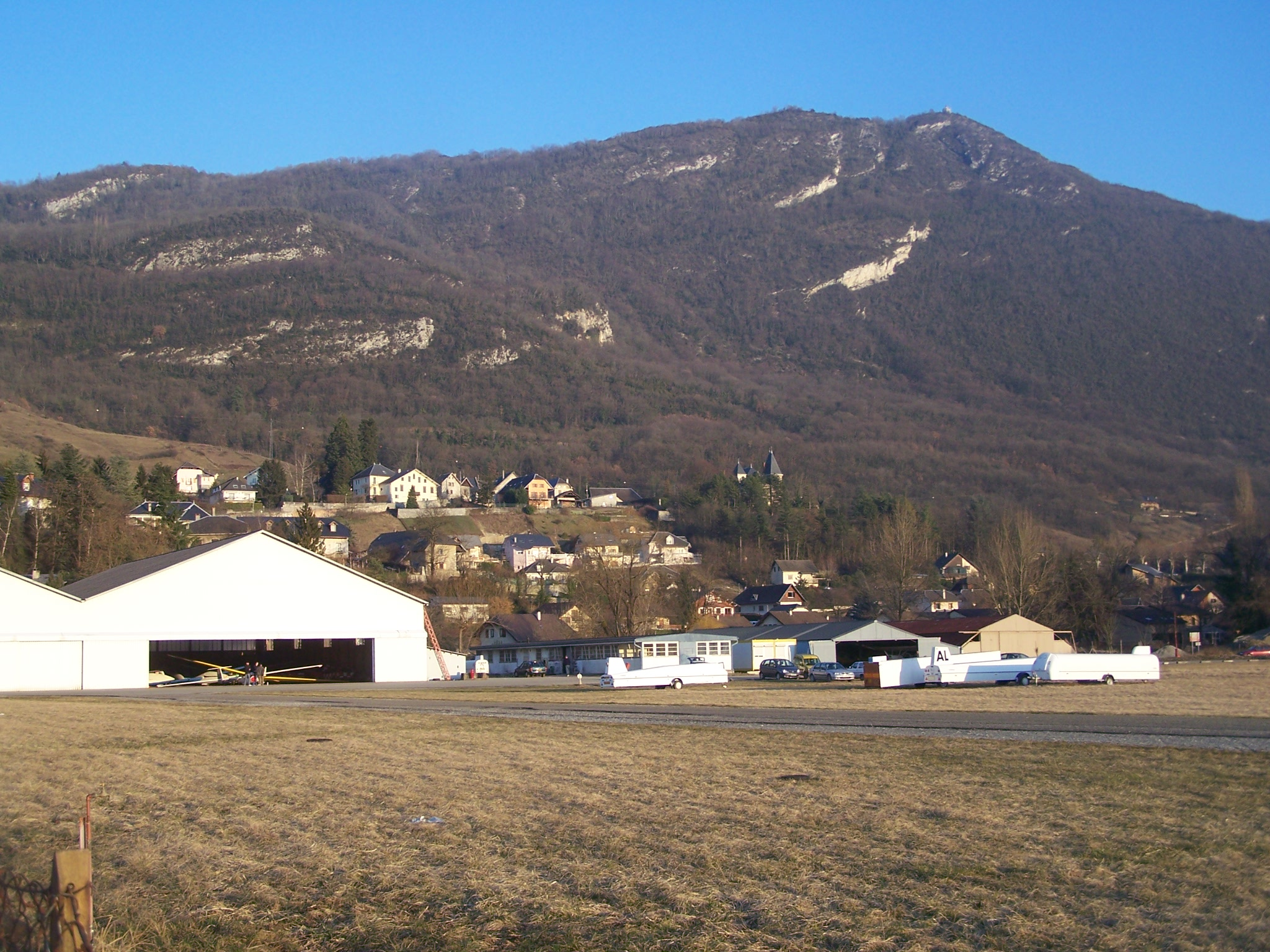
- IATA: none; ICAO: LFLE

Summary
- Airport type: Public
- Serves: Chambéry
- Location: Challes-les-Eaux
- Elevation AMSL: 968 ft (295 m)
- Coordinates: 45°33′38″N 005°58′37″E
- Interactive map of Chambéry Aerodrome

Runways
Direction	Length		Surface
Direction	ft	m	Surface
15/33	3,248	990	Paved
15/33	2,920	890	Grass

Chambéry Aerodrome or Chambéry Challes-les-Eaux Aerodrome (ICAO: LFLE) is an airport located in Challes-les-Eaux, Savoie, near Chambéry.
