= La Ravoire =

La Ravoire La Rovouère (Arpitan)
- Commune
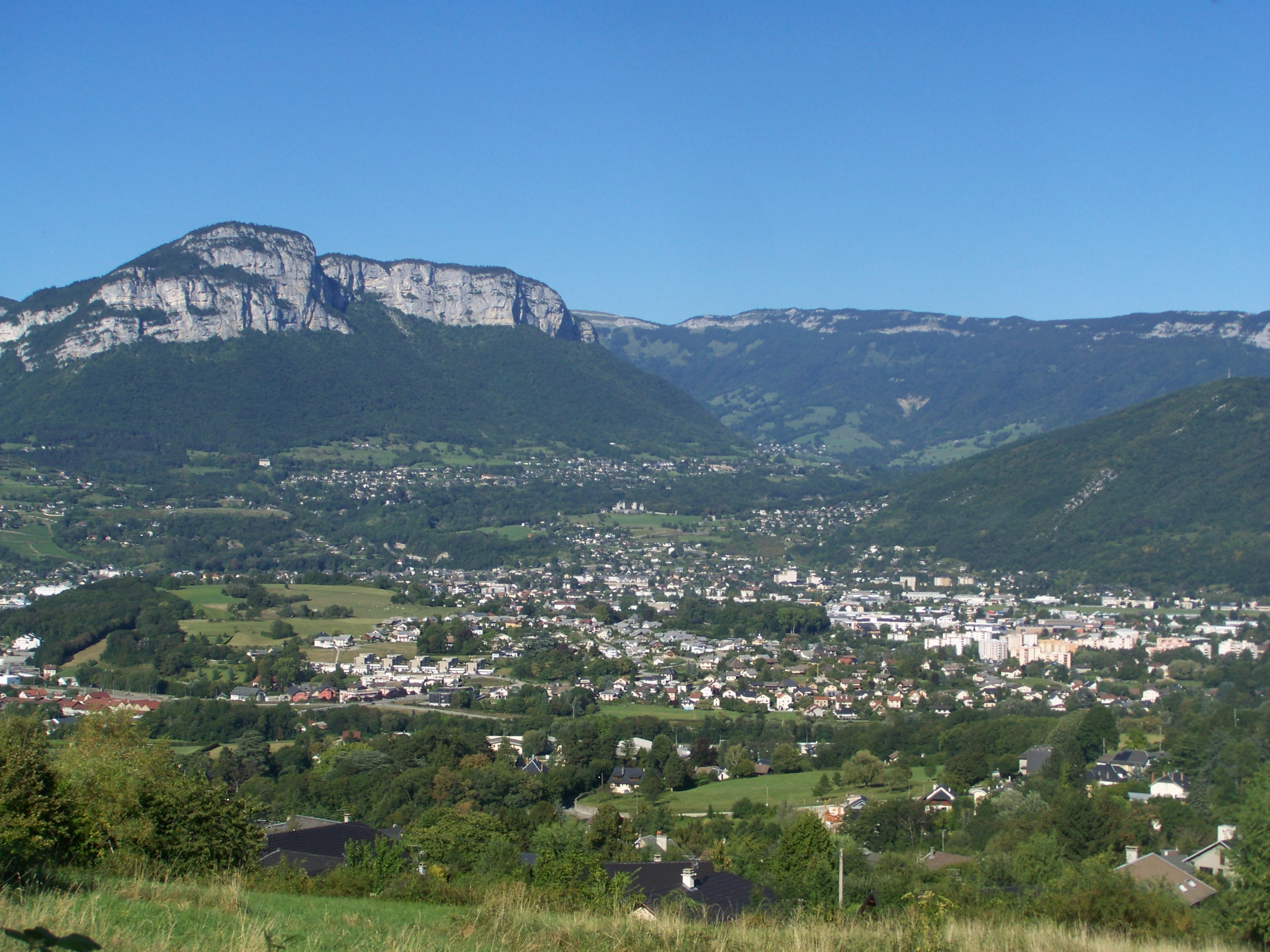
- A general view of La Ravoire

- Coat of arms
- Location of La Ravoire
- Location within France Location within Auvergne-Rhône-Alpes
- Coordinates: 45°34′N 5°58′E
- Country: France
- Region: Auvergne-Rhône-Alpes
- Department: Savoie
- Arrondissement: Chambéry
- Canton: La Ravoire
- Intercommunality: Grand Chambéry

Government
  - Mayor (2020–2026): Alexandre Gennaro
- Area^{1}: 6.82 km^{2} (2.63 sq mi)
- Elevation: 350 m (1,150 ft)
- Highest elevation: 423 m (1,388 ft)
- Lowest elevation: 285 m (935 ft)
- Population (2023): 9,332
  - Density: 1,370/km^{2} (3,540/sq mi)
- Time zone: UTC+01:00 (CET)
  - Summer (DST): UTC+02:00 (CEST)
- INSEE/Postal code: 73213 /73490
- Website: www.laravoire.com
- ^{1} French Land Register data, which excludes lakes, ponds, glaciers > 1 km^{2} (0.386 sq mi or 247 acres) and river estuaries.

La Ravoire (French pronunciation: [la ʁavwaʁ]; Arpitan: La Rovouère or La Ravouère) is a commune in the Savoie department in the Auvergne-Rhône-Alpes region in Southeastern France. It is part of Grand Chambéry.

== Population ==
Historical population
Year	Pop.	±% p.a.
1968	2,694	—
1975	4,020	+5.88%
1982	6,659	+7.48%
1990	6,689	+0.06%
1999	6,555	−0.22%
2007	7,010	+0.84%
2012	8,007	+2.70%
2017	8,457	+1.10%
2023	9,332	+1.65%
Source: INSEE

== Twin towns ==
- Teningen, Germany, since 1984
- Vado Ligure, Italy, since 2002

== See also ==
- Communes of the Savoie department
