= Canton of La Ravoire =

Coordinates: 45.56°N 5.96°E

The canton of La Ravoire is an administrative division of the Savoie department, southeastern France. Its borders were not modified at the French canton reorganization which came into effect in March 2015. Its seat is in La Ravoire.

It consists of the following communes:

1. Barberaz
2. Challes-les-Eaux
3. La Ravoire
4. Saint-Baldoph
5. Saint-Jeoire-Prieuré
