= Gringet =

Variety of grape

- Grape (Vitis)
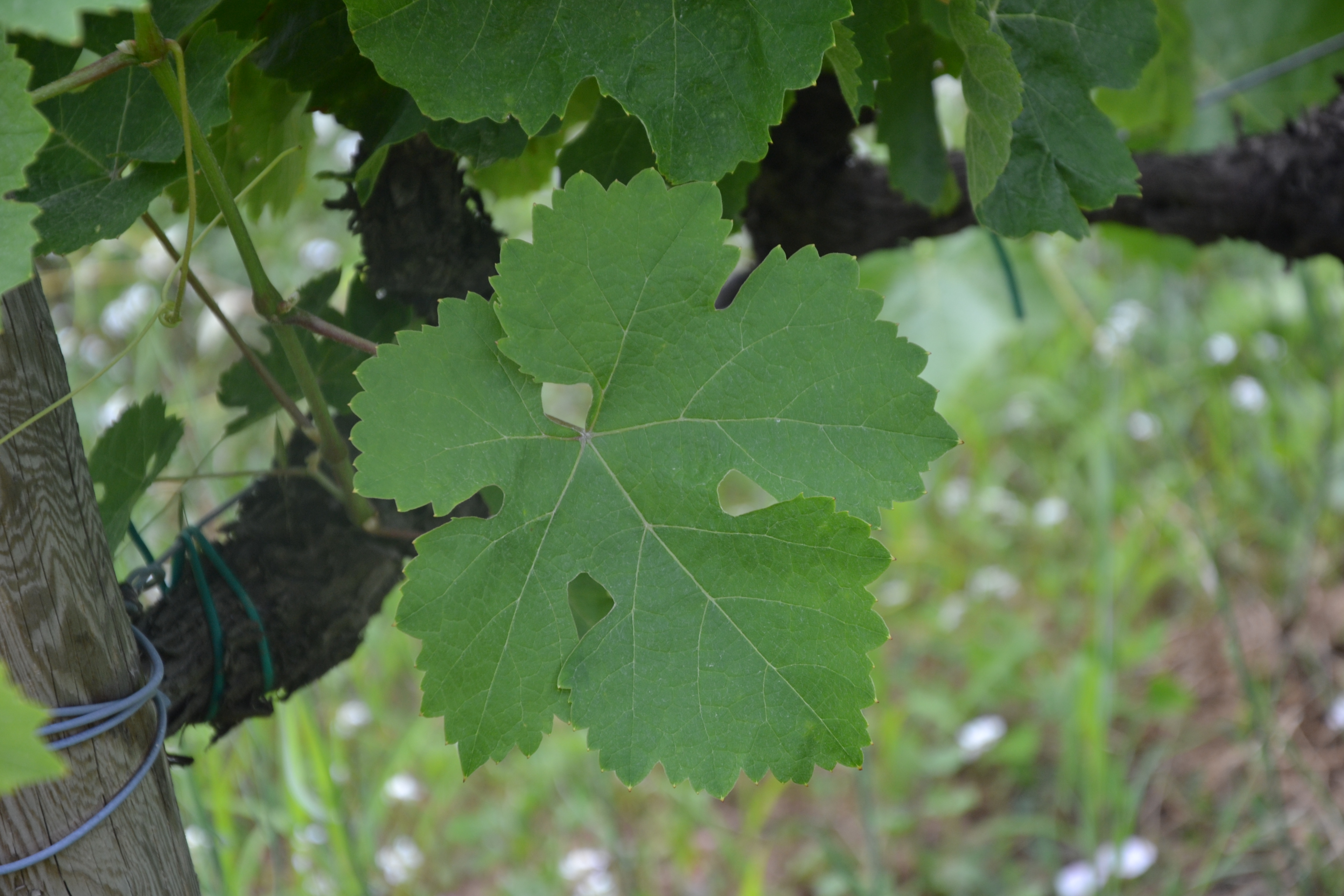
- Gringet's leaf
- Color of berry skin: Blanc
- Notable regions: Haute-Savoie, Savoy
- Notable wines: Ayze (AOC), Vin de Savoie (AOC)

Gringet is an autochthonous white wine grape from Haute-Savoie, France that is used as both a blending grape and for varietal wines. It is mainly used in the Ayze AOC sparkling wine production. The wine grape grown on the hills above the lower Vallee de l'Arve, in the French Alps (Haute-Savoie).

It is unique to the region and there is no link with Savagnin or any Traminer variety.

== History ==
Regularly treated as a variant of Savagnin or another traminer variety, the origins of this grape are still unknown and the different DNA tests to identify kinship with other varieties showed a relationship with the Altesse. It is mainly grown in the valley of the Arve and more specifically in the vineyards of Ayze (AOC). Only this designation carries this variety in an area that represents only about twenty hectares. (22 ha in 2005, 30 ha in 1994)

== Description ==
Young leaves are green. The adult leaves are entire or slightly lobed, the petiole sinus is nearly closed. The blade is flat and lined with teeth and short to medium straight or convex. Clusters are large and small rounded berries.

== Wines ==
This grape makes both still and sparkling wines. The aromas are light, marked by floral scents. Most famous wine : Ayze (sparkling wine).
