= Roussette de Savoie =

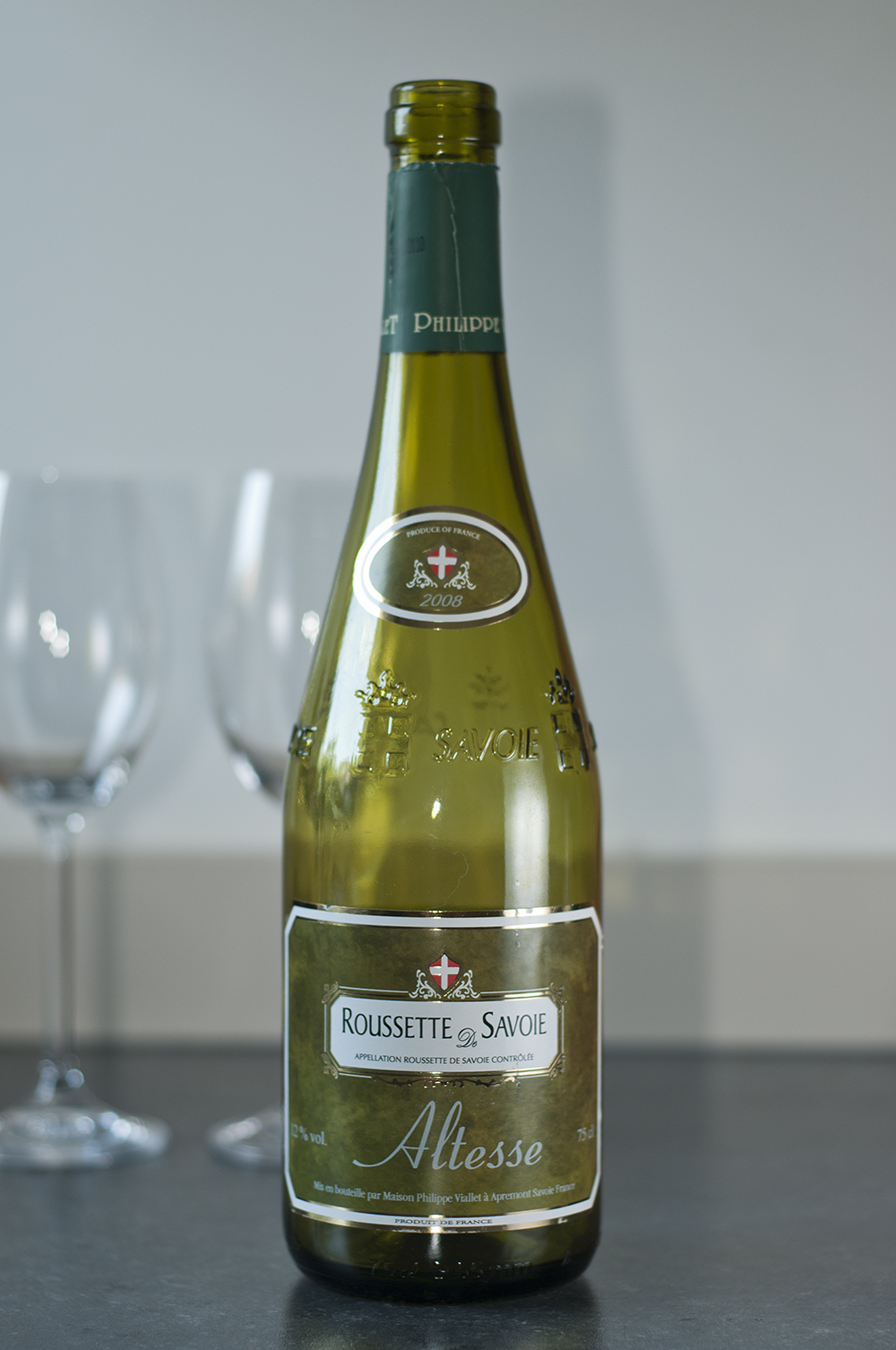

Roussette de Savoie (French pronunciation: [ʁusɛt də savwa]) is an Appellation d'Origine Contrôlée (AOC) for white wine in the Savoy wine region of France. The AOC covers much of the Western part of the Savoie AOC for wines made at least in part from the regional grape variety known as Altesse, also called Roussette. Roussette de Savoie is the second-largest appellation in Savoie and is responsible (as of 2012) for approximately 10% of the region's production.

The late-ripening grape Altesse is the only permitted variety in the appellation. Formerly, wines that were designated merely as Roussette de Savoie AOC (rather than with some specific Cru) were blended with up to 50% Chardonnay, although blending with Chardonnay is no longer permitted.

Roussette de Savoie's high acidity give it the potential to age. These dry white wines typically have a nose of violet and mountain herbs with flavors of minerals, bergamot, honey and hazelnut.

== Cru Vineyards ==
There are four cru vineyards within the Roussette de Savoie AOC that may attach their names to the appellation: Frangy, Marestel, Monterminod and Monthoux. The best vineyards within the AOC are situated on Quaternary alluvial fans along the edges of the Massifs of Bauges and Borne. The cru vineyards are characterized by steep slopes, which offer excellent drainage and maximize exposure to sunlight in the cool, alpine climate. Wines with one of these four cru designations are made to more stringent production standards (with regard to yields and minimum alcohol) than basic Roussette de Savoie wines.
