= Molette =

French wine grape

- Grape (Vitis)
- Color of berry skin: Blanc
- Species: Vitis vinifera
- Also called: see list of synonyms
- Origin: France
- VIVC number: 7898

Molette (French pronunciation: [mɔlɛt]) is a white French wine grape planted primarily in the Savoie region. As a varietal wine, Molette tends to produce neutral tasting wine so it is often blended with Roussette to add more complexity.

DNA analysis has revealed Molette to be a cross between Gouais blanc and an unidentified grape variety.

== Synonyms ==
Molette is also known under the synonyms Molette blanche and Molette de Seyssel.

Molette is also used as a synonym for Mondeuse blanche and Mondeuse noire. Furthermore, Molette noire is a synonym of Mondeuse noire and Molette de Montmelian is a synonym of Jacquère.
