= Barberaz =

Barberaz Barbéro (Savoyard)
- Commune
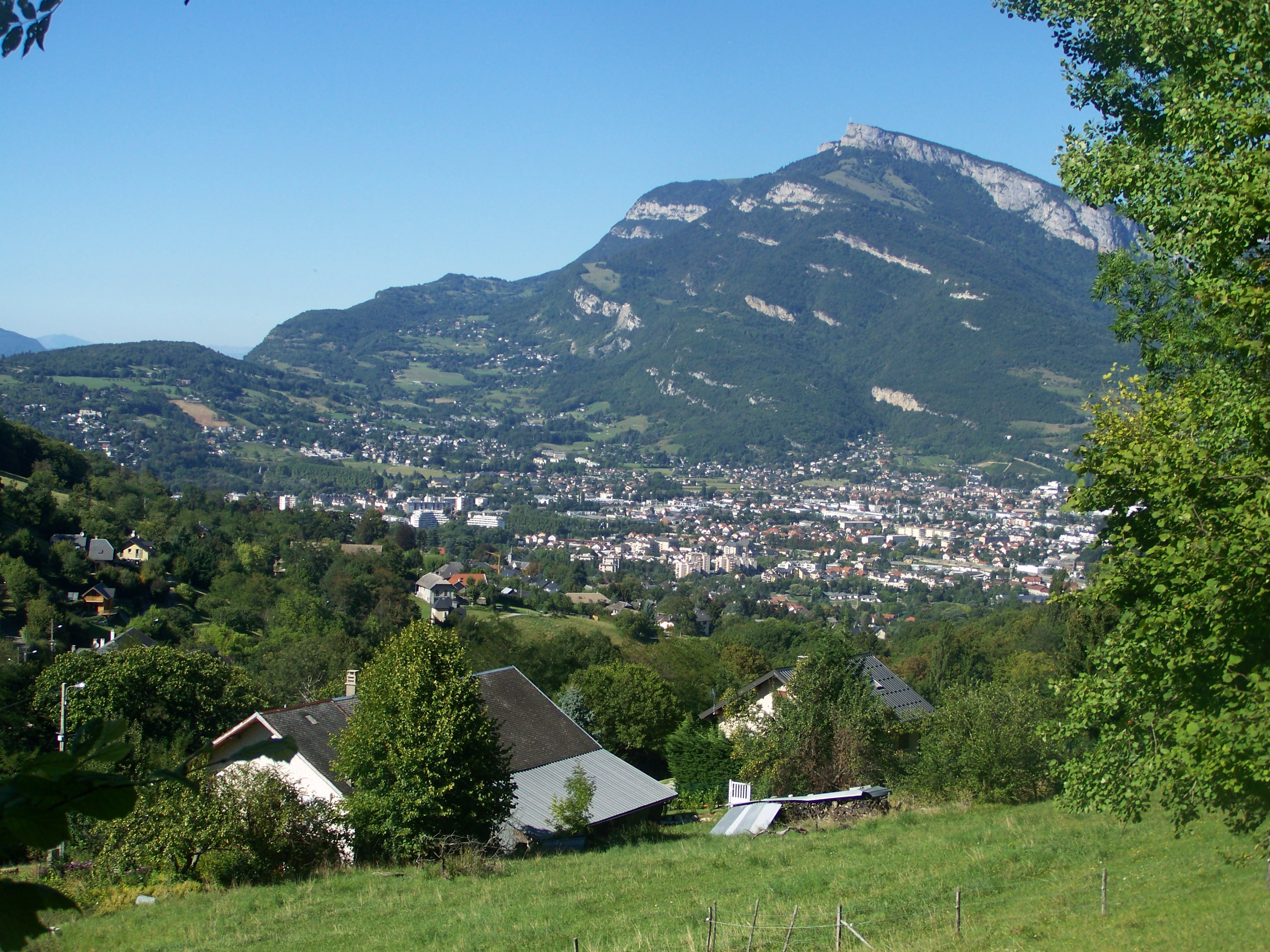
- A general view of Barberaz

- Coat of arms
- Location of Barberaz
- Location within France Location within Auvergne-Rhône-Alpes
- Coordinates: 45°33′50″N 5°56′56″E
- Country: France
- Region: Auvergne-Rhône-Alpes
- Department: Savoie
- Arrondissement: Chambéry
- Canton: La Ravoire
- Intercommunality: Grand Chambéry

Government
  - Mayor (2020–2026): Arthur Boix-Neveu
- Area^{1}: 3.79 km^{2} (1.46 sq mi)
- Highest elevation: 720 m (2,360 ft)
- Lowest elevation: 260 m (850 ft)
- Population (2023): 5,306
  - Density: 1,400/km^{2} (3,630/sq mi)
- Demonym(s): Barberaziens, Barberaziennes
- Time zone: UTC+01:00 (CET)
  - Summer (DST): UTC+02:00 (CEST)
- INSEE/Postal code: 73029 /73000
- Website: www.barberaz.fr
- ^{1} French Land Register data, which excludes lakes, ponds, glaciers > 1 km^{2} (0.386 sq mi or 247 acres) and river estuaries.

Barberaz (French pronunciation: [baʁbəʁa]; Arpitan: Barbéro) is a commune in the Savoie department in the Auvergne-Rhône-Alpes region in south-eastern France. It is part of the urban area of Chambéry.

== Population ==
Historical population
Year	Pop.	±% p.a.
1968	3,235	—
1975	3,329	+0.41%
1982	3,793	+1.88%
1990	4,195	+1.27%
1999	4,663	+1.18%
2007	4,722	+0.16%
2012	4,572	−0.64%
2017	4,717	+0.63%
2023	5,306	+1.98%
Source: INSEE

== See also ==
- Communes of the Savoie department
