= Saint-Baldoph =

Saint-Baldoph Sè Bardo (Savoyard)
- Commune
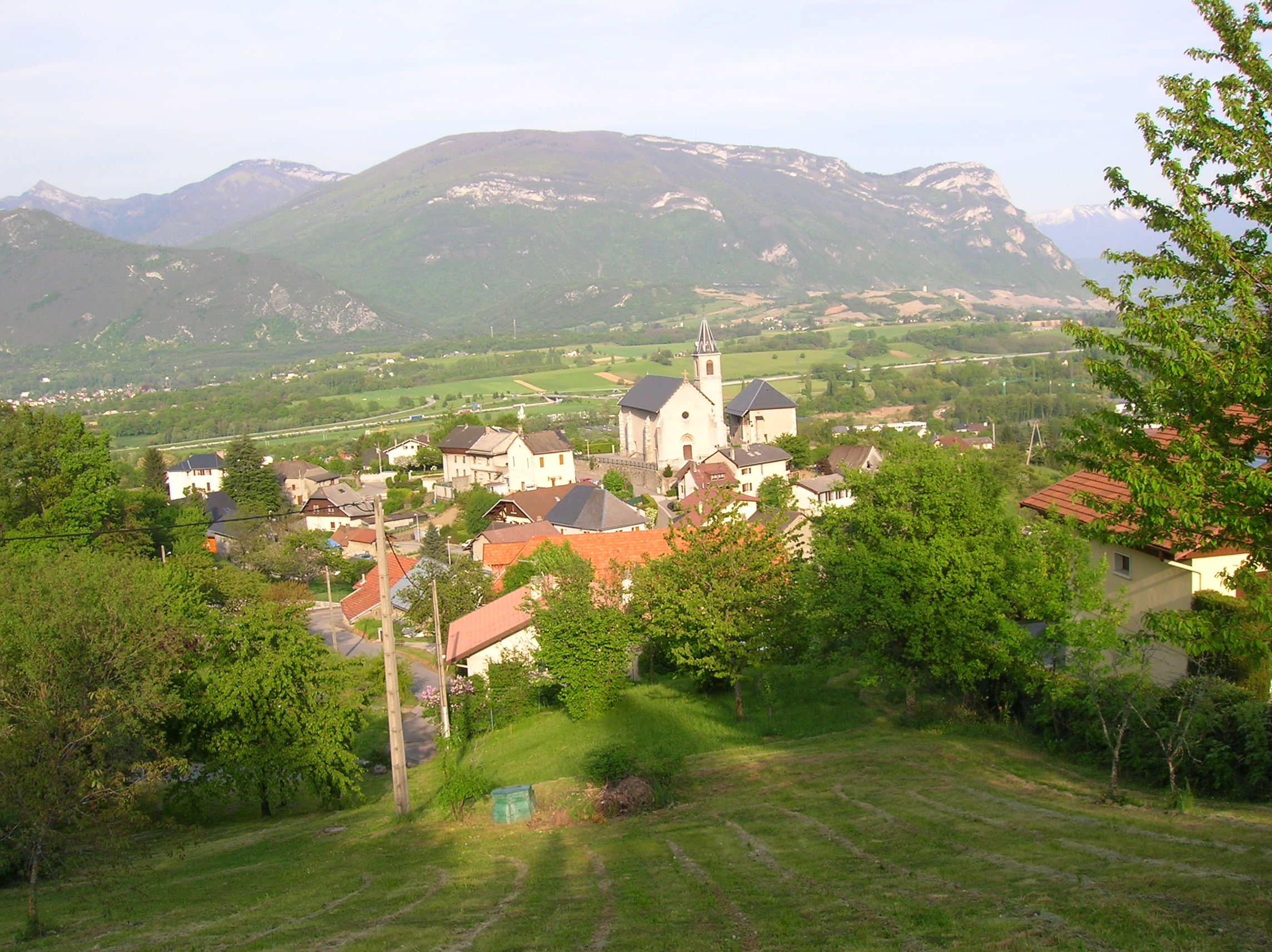
- A panoramic view of Saint-Baldoph
- Location of Saint-Baldoph
- Location within France Location within Auvergne-Rhône-Alpes
- Coordinates: 45°32′10″N 5°57′11″E
- Country: France
- Region: Auvergne-Rhône-Alpes
- Department: Savoie
- Arrondissement: Chambéry
- Canton: La Ravoire
- Intercommunality: Grand Chambéry

Government
  - Mayor (2024–2026): Valentin Hachet
- Area^{1}: 6.24 km^{2} (2.41 sq mi)
- Highest elevation: 881 m (2,890 ft)
- Lowest elevation: 291 m (955 ft)
- Population (2023): 2,949
  - Density: 473/km^{2} (1,220/sq mi)
- Time zone: UTC+01:00 (CET)
  - Summer (DST): UTC+02:00 (CEST)
- INSEE/Postal code: 73225 /73190
- Website: www.saintbaldoph.fr
- ^{1} French Land Register data, which excludes lakes, ponds, glaciers > 1 km^{2} (0.386 sq mi or 247 acres) and river estuaries.

Saint-Baldoph (French pronunciation: [sɛ̃ baldɔf]; Savoyard: Sè Bardo) is a commune in the Savoie department in the Auvergne-Rhône-Alpes region in south-eastern France. It is part of the urban area of Chambéry.

== Population ==
Historical population
Year	Pop.	±% p.a.
1968	911	—
1975	1,153	+3.42%
1982	1,358	+2.37%
1990	2,227	+6.38%
1999	2,843	+2.75%
2007	2,936	+0.40%
2012	2,914	−0.15%
2017	2,809	−0.73%
2023	2,949	+0.81%
Source: INSEE

== See also ==
- Communes of the Savoie department
