= Chignin =

- Commune
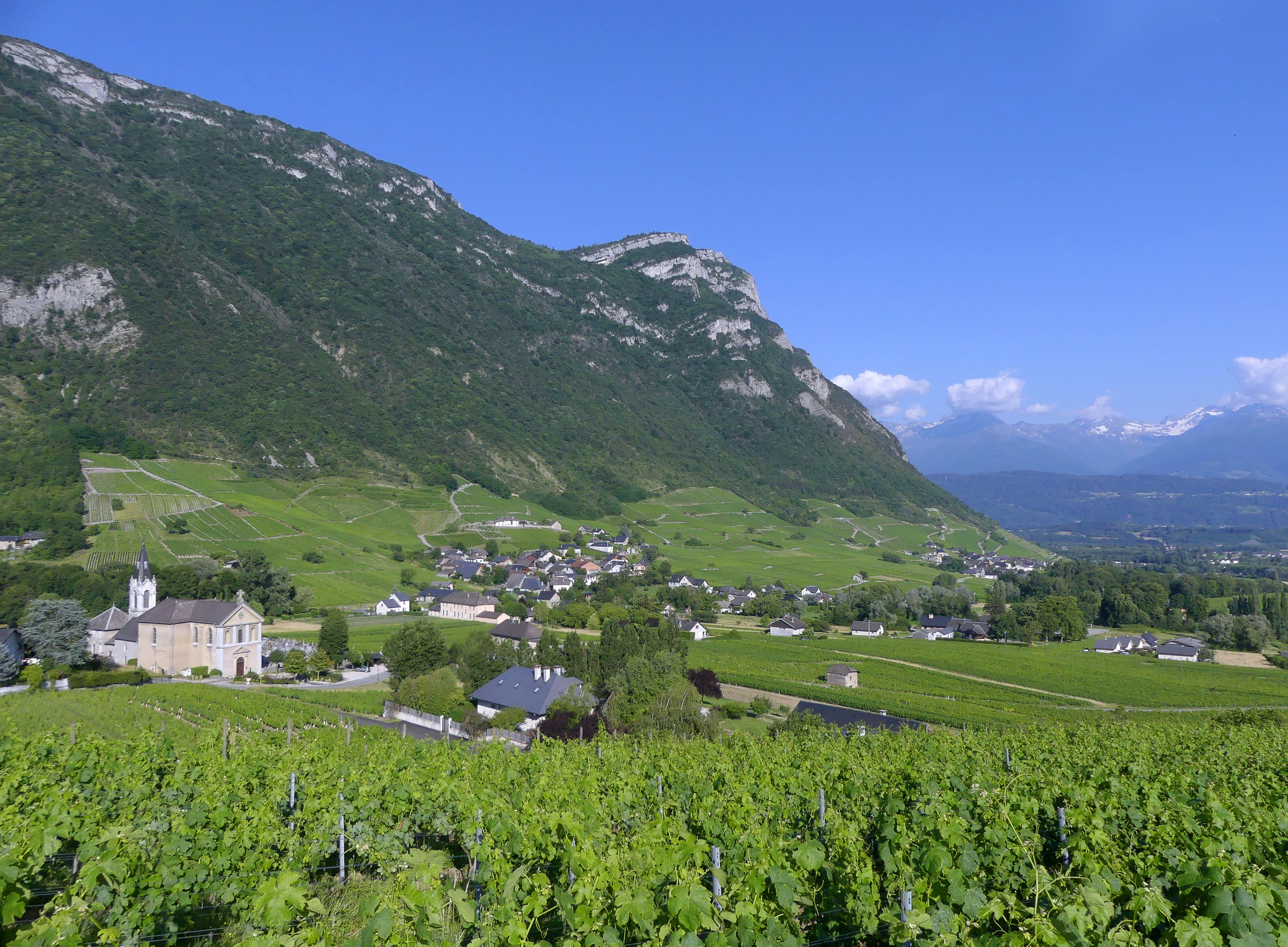
- Chignin and vineyards

- Coat of arms
- Location of Chignin
- Location within France Location within Auvergne-Rhône-Alpes
- Coordinates: 45°31′30″N 6°00′47″E
- Country: France
- Region: Auvergne-Rhône-Alpes
- Department: Savoie
- Arrondissement: Chambéry
- Canton: Montmélian

Government
  - Mayor (2020–2026): Michel Ravier
- Area^{1}: 8.32 km^{2} (3.21 sq mi)
- Elevation: 350 m (1,150 ft)
- Highest elevation: 1,254 m (4,114 ft)
- Lowest elevation: 276 m (906 ft)
- Population (2023): 923
  - Density: 111/km^{2} (287/sq mi)
- Time zone: UTC+01:00 (CET)
  - Summer (DST): UTC+02:00 (CEST)
- INSEE/Postal code: 73084 /73800
- Dialling codes: 0479
- Website: www.chignin.fr
- ^{1} French Land Register data, which excludes lakes, ponds, glaciers > 1 km^{2} (0.386 sq mi or 247 acres) and river estuaries.

Chignin (French pronunciation: [ʃiɲɛ̃]; Arpitan: Shenyin) is a commune in the Savoie department in the Auvergne-Rhône-Alpes region in south-eastern France.

The village of Chignin is located between the communes of Les Marches, Montmélian, Saint-Jeoire-Prieuré and Challes-les-Eaux, behind the Monronjoue downs in front of which the route nationale 6 runs.

It is famous for its white wine. Most Chignin is a scented dry white made from the local Jacquere grape variety.

Red wine accounts for only about 26% of Chignin's production. The most notable red grape varieties within the region are Gamay and Mondeuse Noire.

== See also ==
- Communes of the Savoie department
