= Crépy AOC =

French wine appellation in the Savoy wine region

Crépy (French pronunciation: [kʁepi]) is a former Appellation d'Origine Contrôlée (AOC) for white wine in the Savoy wine region of France. The region is on the south side of Lake Geneva.

The wines are exclusively white, made from the Chasselas grape variety which is also extensively grown in Switzerland. The wines are light and dry and best drunk young.
