= Saint-Alban-Leysse =

Saint-Alban-Leysse Sant Arban Lésse (Savoyard)
- Commune
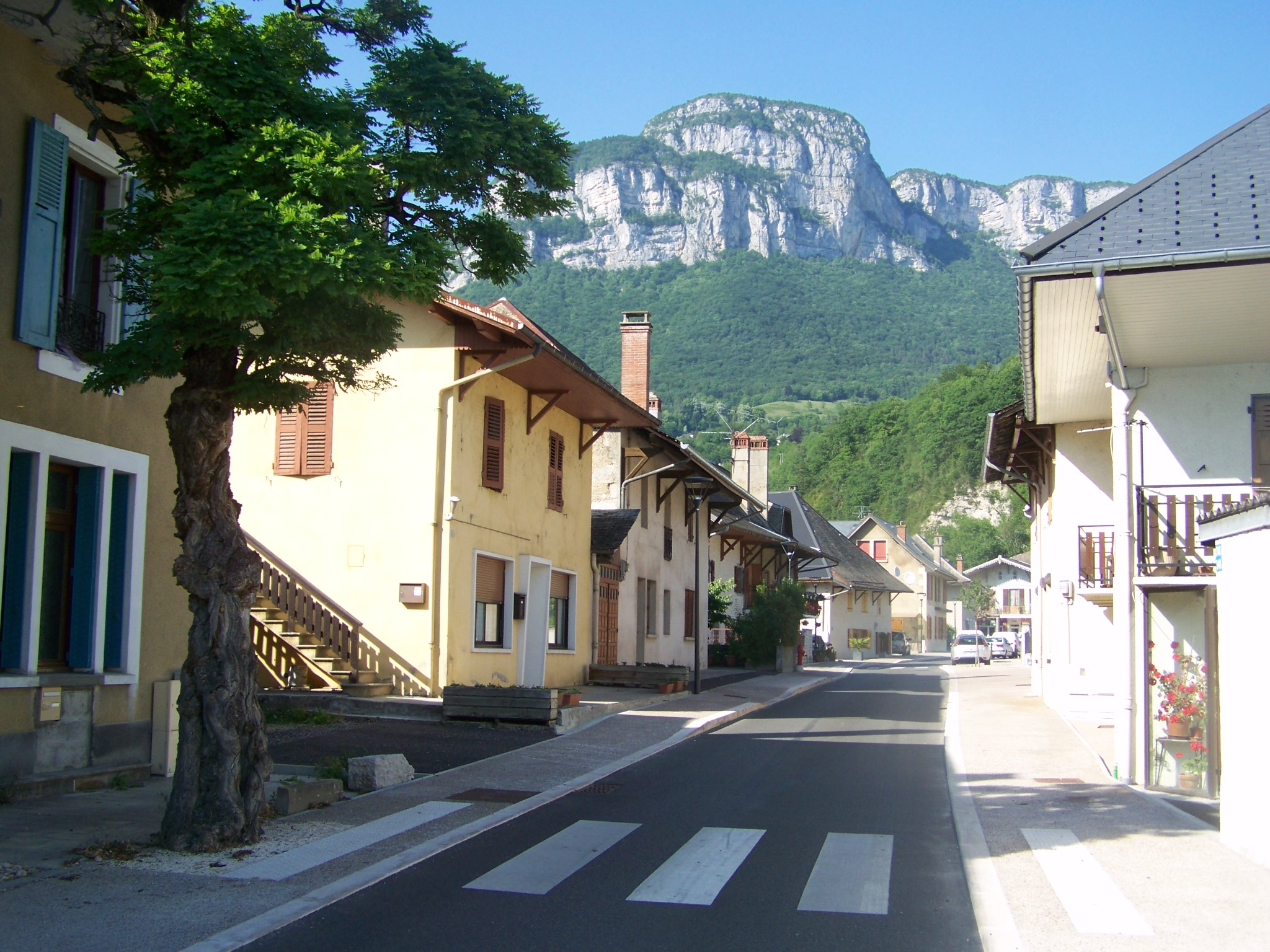
- A street in Saint-Alban-Leysse
- Location of Saint-Alban-Leysse
- Location within France Location within Auvergne-Rhône-Alpes
- Coordinates: 45°34′52″N 5°57′31″E
- Country: France
- Region: Auvergne-Rhône-Alpes
- Department: Savoie
- Arrondissement: Chambéry
- Canton: Saint-Alban-Leysse
- Intercommunality: Grand Chambéry

Government
  - Mayor (2020–2026): Michel Dyen
- Area^{1}: 8.4 km^{2} (3.2 sq mi)
- Highest elevation: 1,240 m (4,070 ft)
- Lowest elevation: 290 m (950 ft)
- Population (2023): 6,734
  - Density: 800/km^{2} (2,100/sq mi)
- Time zone: UTC+01:00 (CET)
  - Summer (DST): UTC+02:00 (CEST)
- INSEE/Postal code: 73222 /73230
- Website: www.saintalbanleysse.fr
- ^{1} French Land Register data, which excludes lakes, ponds, glaciers > 1 km^{2} (0.386 sq mi or 247 acres) and river estuaries.

Saint-Alban-Leysse (French pronunciation: [sɛ̃.t‿albɑ̃ lɛs]; Savoyard: Sant Arban Lésse) is a commune in the Savoie department in the Auvergne-Rhône-Alpes region in south-eastern France. It is part of the urban area of Chambéry.

== Population ==
Historical population
Year	Pop.	±% p.a.
1968	2,837	—
1975	2,996	+0.78%
1982	2,797	−0.98%
1990	3,858	+4.10%
1999	5,071	+3.08%
2007	5,560	+1.16%
2012	5,663	+0.37%
2017	6,007	+1.19%
2023	6,734	+1.92%
Source: INSEE

== See also ==
- Communes of the Savoie department
- Chateau de Monterminod
