= Challes-les-Eaux =

Challes-les-Eaux Chales (Arpitan)
- Commune
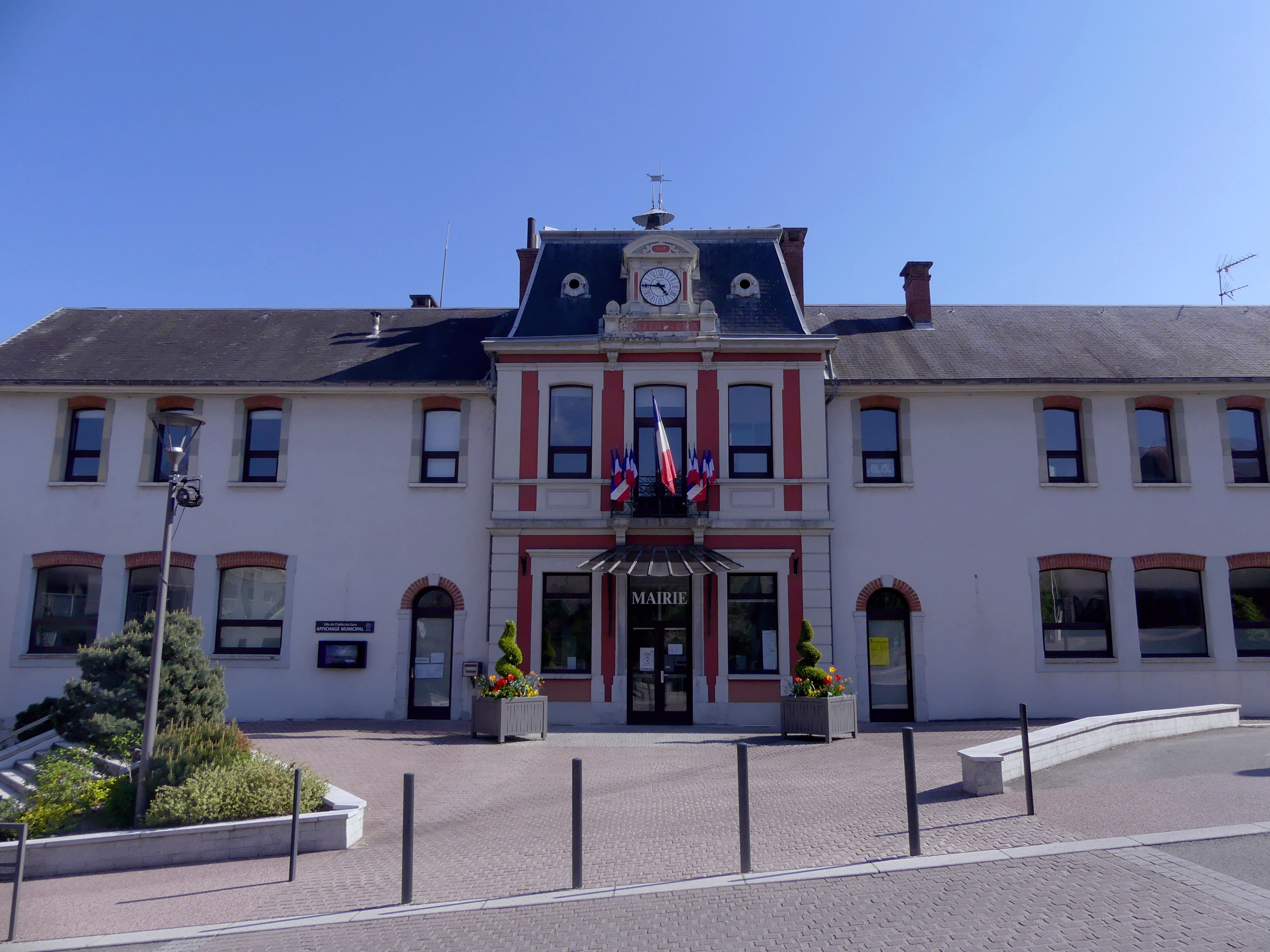
- Challes-les-Eaux Town Hall

- Coat of arms
- Location of Challes-les-Eaux
- Location within France Location within Auvergne-Rhône-Alpes
- Coordinates: 45°32′43″N 5°58′49″E
- Country: France
- Region: Auvergne-Rhône-Alpes
- Department: Savoie
- Arrondissement: Chambéry
- Canton: La Ravoire
- Intercommunality: Grand Chambéry

Government
  - Mayor (2020–2026): Josette Remy
- Area^{1}: 5.65 km^{2} (2.18 sq mi)
- Highest elevation: 565 m (1,854 ft)
- Lowest elevation: 290 m (950 ft)
- Population (2023): 5,630
  - Density: 996/km^{2} (2,580/sq mi)
- Demonym: Challésiens / Challésiennes
- Time zone: UTC+01:00 (CET)
  - Summer (DST): UTC+02:00 (CEST)
- INSEE/Postal code: 73064 /73190
- Website: www.ville-challesleseaux.fr
- ^{1} French Land Register data, which excludes lakes, ponds, glaciers > 1 km^{2} (0.386 sq mi or 247 acres) and river estuaries.

Challes-les-Eaux (French pronunciation: [ʃal lez‿o]; lit. 'Challes-the-Waters'; Arpitan: Chales), known as Triviers until 1872, is a commune in the Savoie department in the Auvergne-Rhône-Alpes region in Southeastern France.

Chambéry Aerodrome is located in the commune. Chambéry-Challes-les-Eaux station, located in Chambéry to the northwest of Challes-les-Eaux, bears the name of the commune along that of Chambéry.

== Geography ==
=== Climate ===
Challes-les-Eaux has an oceanic climate (Köppen climate classification Cfb) closely bordering on a humid subtropical climate (Cfa). The average annual temperature in Challes-les-Eaux is 11.8 °C (53.2 °F). The average annual rainfall is 1,147.6 mm (45.18 in) with December as the wettest month.

The temperatures are highest on average in July, at around 21.5 °C (70.7 °F), and lowest in January, at around 2.3 °C (36.1 °F). The highest temperature ever recorded in Challes-les-Eaux was 39.8 °C (103.6 °F) on 31 July 2020; the coldest temperature ever recorded was −23.0 °C (−9.4 °F) on 14 January 1960.

Climate data for Challes-les-Eaux (1991−2020 normals, extremes 1946−present)
Month	Jan	Feb	Mar	Apr	May	Jun	Jul	Aug	Sep	Oct	Nov	Dec	Year
Record high °C (°F)	21.5 (70.7)	21.9 (71.4)	27.1 (80.8)	29.5 (85.1)	33.7 (92.7)	37.5 (99.5)	39.8 (103.6)	39.7 (103.5)	33.6 (92.5)	30.6 (87.1)	25.3 (77.5)	23.3 (73.9)	39.8 (103.6)
Mean daily maximum °C (°F)	6.4 (43.5)	8.7 (47.7)	13.9 (57.0)	17.7 (63.9)	21.7 (71.1)	25.6 (78.1)	28.1 (82.6)	27.7 (81.9)	22.8 (73.0)	17.4 (63.3)	10.8 (51.4)	6.8 (44.2)	17.3 (63.1)
Daily mean °C (°F)	2.3 (36.1)	3.6 (38.5)	7.8 (46.0)	11.4 (52.5)	15.6 (60.1)	19.4 (66.9)	21.5 (70.7)	21.1 (70.0)	16.9 (62.4)	12.3 (54.1)	6.5 (43.7)	2.9 (37.2)	11.8 (53.2)
Mean daily minimum °C (°F)	−1.8 (28.8)	−1.5 (29.3)	1.7 (35.1)	5.1 (41.2)	9.5 (49.1)	13.2 (55.8)	15.0 (59.0)	14.6 (58.3)	11.0 (51.8)	7.2 (45.0)	2.3 (36.1)	−1.0 (30.2)	6.3 (43.3)
Record low °C (°F)	−23.0 (−9.4)	−22.1 (−7.8)	−16.1 (3.0)	−8.1 (17.4)	−4.0 (24.8)	0.3 (32.5)	3.1 (37.6)	3.9 (39.0)	−1.2 (29.8)	−6.0 (21.2)	−12.8 (9.0)	−19.9 (−3.8)	−23.0 (−9.4)
Average precipitation mm (inches)	95.1 (3.74)	74.0 (2.91)	86.5 (3.41)	83.4 (3.28)	99.7 (3.93)	97.2 (3.83)	93.3 (3.67)	100.2 (3.94)	97.1 (3.82)	101.3 (3.99)	107.6 (4.24)	112.2 (4.42)	1,147.6 (45.18)
Average precipitation days (≥ 1.0 mm)	10.4	8.5	9.7	9.8	11.1	10.4	9.0	9.0	8.6	10.7	10.9	11.1	119.1
Source: Météo-France

== Population ==
Historical population
Year	Pop.	±% p.a.
1968	2,031	—
1975	2,308	+1.84%
1982	2,580	+1.60%
1990	2,801	+1.03%
1999	3,931	+3.84%
2007	4,920	+2.84%
2012	5,050	+0.52%
2017	5,590	+2.05%
2023	5,630	+0.12%
Source: INSEE

== See also ==
- Communes of the Savoie department
