= Altesse =

Variety of grape

- Grape (Vitis)
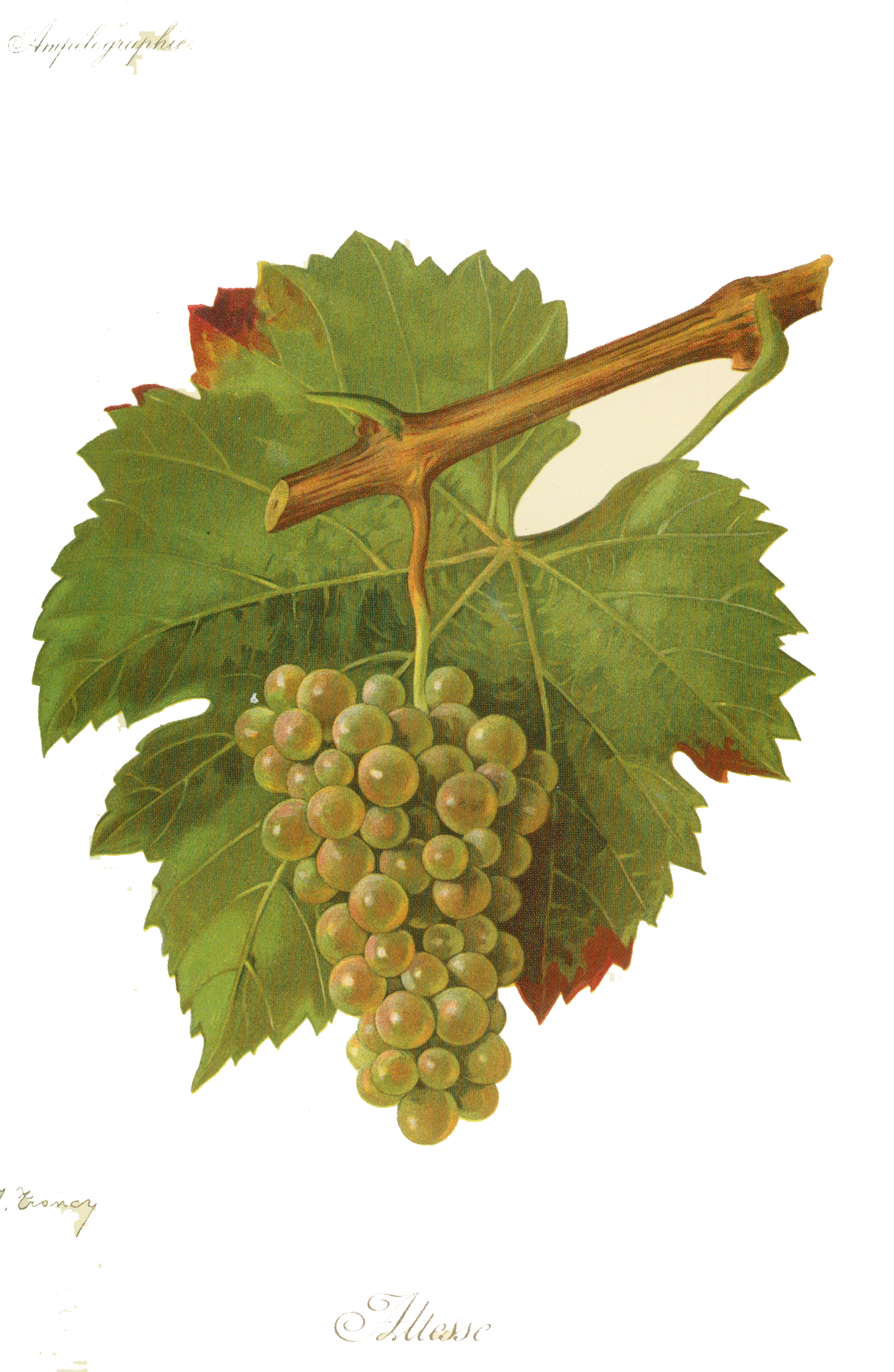
- Altesse in Viala & Vermorel
- Color of berry skin: Blanc
- Species: Vitis vinifera
- Also called: Altesse Blanche, Roussette, and other synonyms
- Origin: France
- Notable regions: Savoy, Bugey
- Notable wines: Roussette de Savoie
- VIVC number: 354

Altesse (French pronunciation: [altɛs]) or Roussette (French pronunciation: [ʁusɛt]) is a white French wine grape variety found primarily in the Savoy wine region of France. It yields small harvests and ripens late but is resistant to grey rot. Wines made from Altesse have exotic aromas, often together with citrus and herbs, and have good acidity. They are considered to age well.

In the vineyard, Altesse is said to be very similar to the Furmint variety of Hungary. The origin of Altesse is subject to various claims, including an origin in Cyprus, but a French origin seems more probable.

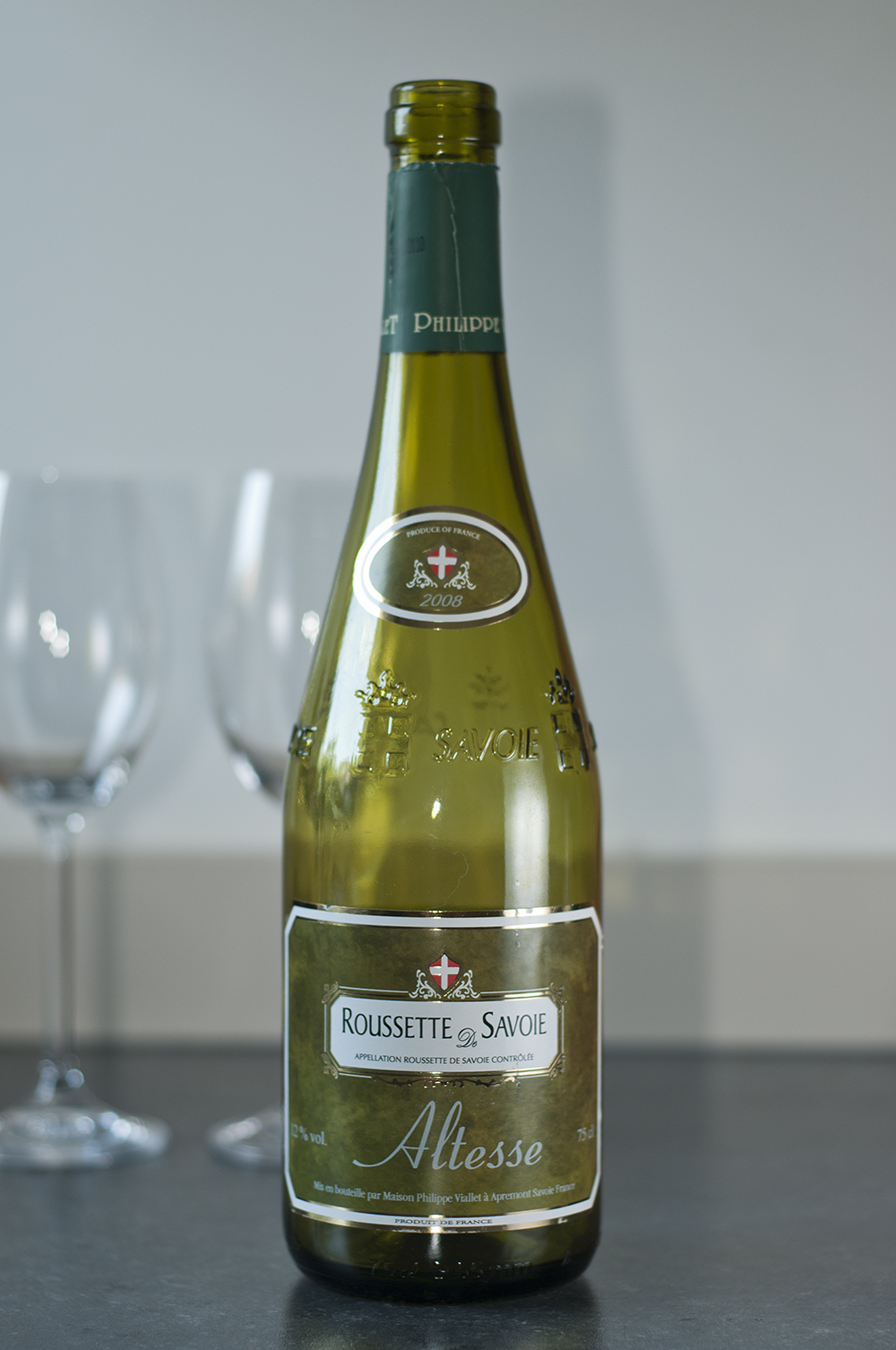
A Savoy wine showing both major synonyms of Altesse and Roussette on the wine label

== Wine regions ==
Altesse is the variety used for the appellation Roussette de Savoie as well as Roussette du Bugey in the neighbouring tiny wine region of Bugey. For wines which only display the appellation name, rather than the appellation name together with that of a village, it has previously been allowed to blend in up to 50% of Chardonnay. This practice has recently been phased out from Savoy and is being phased out from Bugey. From the 2001 vintage all Roussette de Savoie must be made from 100% Altesse, and from the 2009 vintage the same applies to all Roussette de Bugey.

There were 300 hectares (740 acres) of Altesse in France in 2000.

== Wine styles ==
The "Roussette" wines of Savoy and Bugey are produced both with and without the influence of oak. The Altesse grape may also be blended into "plain" white Savoy and Bugey wine as well as the sparkling wines of the regions.

== Synonyms ==
Synonyms include Altesse Blanche, Altesse Verte, Arin, Fusette, Fusette d'Amberieu, Fusette de Montagnieu, Ignam, Ignan Blanc, Maconnais, Petit Maconnais, Prin Blanc, Rousette Haute, Roussette, Roussette Basse, Roussette de Montagnieu, Roussette Grosse, Roussette Haute, Roussette Petite, Serene Blanche.
