= Black Hill =

Black Hill may refer to:

== Australia ==
- Black Hill, Ballarat, an area of Ballarat, Victoria
- Black Hill Conservation Park, near Adelaide
- Black Hill, South Australia, formerly known as Friedensthal in South Australia
- Black Hill, New South Wales, near Newcastle
- Black Hill, Victoria, a locality near Ballarat

== Hong Kong ==
- Black Hill, Hong Kong, a hill in Hong Kong

== India ==
- Kalo Dungar also known as Black Hill in Kutch, India

== Ireland ==
- Black Hill (Wicklow Mountains), 602 m peak in County Wicklow

== United Kingdom ==
=== England ===
- Black Hill (Northwest Dartmoor) (584m), a hill in northwestern Dartmoor
- Black Hill (East Dartmoor) (412m), a hill on the eastern edge of Dartmoor
- Black Hill (East Sussex) (223 m), second highest point in East Sussex
- Black Hill (Herefordshire) (640m), a mountain near Craswall in the Black Mountains
- Black Hill (Peak District) (582m), a Marilyn and the highest point in West Yorkshire
- Black Hill (Quantocks) (358m), a prominent high point in the Quantock Hills, Somerset
- Black Hill Down, Dorset

=== Northern Ireland ===
- Black Hill, County Antrim, a townland in County Antrim, Northern Ireland

=== Scotland ===
- Black Hill (Earlston), a Marilyn in the Southern Uplands near Earlston
- Black Hill (Pentland Hills), a Marilyn in the Pentland Hills
- Black Hill (Clydesdale), a hill fort owned by the National Trust for Scotland
- Black Hill transmitting station, a radio and television broadcasting facility in Scotland
- Black Hill (Sidlaw Hills), a Marilyn in the South East of Perth & Kinross

== United States ==
- Black Hill (California), a hill near Morro Bay

== See also ==
- Blackhill (disambiguation)
- Black Hills (disambiguation)
- Black Mountain (disambiguation)
- Black Mountains (disambiguation)
- Black Rock (disambiguation)
