= Livermore Valley AVA =

Wine grape–growing region in San Francisco Bay Area, California, U.S.

Coordinates: 37°40′21″N 121°44′12″W

Livermore Valley
- Wine region
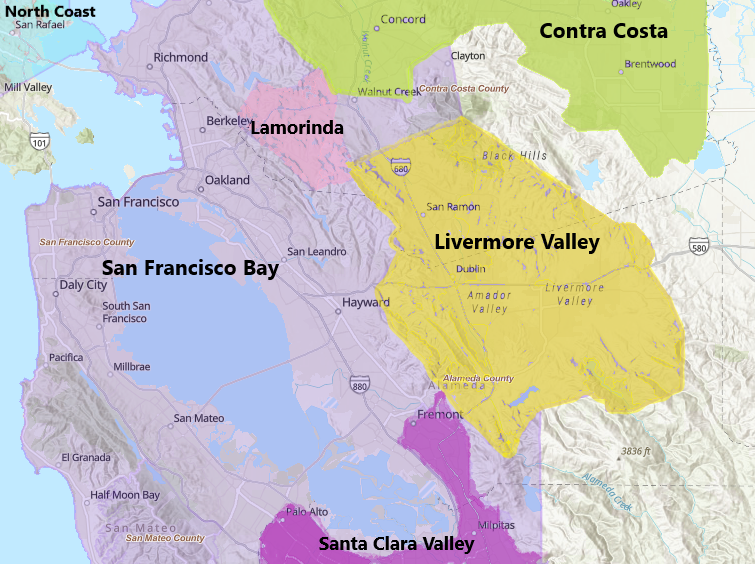
- Type: American Viticultural Area
- Year established: 1982; 2006 Expansion
- Country: United States
- Part of: California, Central Coast AVA, San Francisco Bay AVA
- Other regions in California, Central Coast AVA, San Francisco Bay AVA: Santa Clara Valley AVA, Lamorinda AVA, Contra Costa AVA
- Growing season: 254 days
- Climate region: Region II-III
- Heat units: 2,501–3,425 GDD
- Precipitation (annual average): 14.45 in (367 mm)
- Soil conditions: Yolo-Pleasanton associations with the Livermore gravelly, sandy loam
- Total area: 96,000 acres (150 sq mi); 2006: 259,000 acres (405 sq mi)
- Size of planted vineyards: 3,000 acres (1,214 ha); 2006: 4,355 acres (1,762 ha)
- Grapes produced: Barbera, Cabernet Franc, Cabernet Sauvignon, Chardonnay, Chenin blanc, Cinsault, Colombard, Counoise, Gewurztraminer, Grenache, Malbec, Merlot, Mourvedre, Muscat Canelli, Nebbiolo, Petit Verdot, Petite Sirah, Pinot blanc, Pinot gris, Pinot noir, Roussanne, Sangiovese, Sauvignon blanc, Semillon, Souzao, Syrah, Tempranillo, Touriga Francesa, Touriga Nacional, Viognier, Zinfandel
- No. of wineries: 50+

Livermore Valley is an American Viticultural Area (AVA) in Alameda County, California, centered around the city of Livermore in the Tri-Valley region which is composed of Amador, San Ramon, and Livermore valleys. The valley was named by Robert Livermore, a 19th-century landowner whose holdings encompassed the area who planted the first grapevines in the region. The appellation was established as the nation's nineteenth, the state's thirteenth and the county's initial AVA on September 1, 1982 by the Bureau of Alcohol, Tobacco and Firearms (ATF), Treasury after reviewing the petition submitted by fifteen Livermore Valley vintners and growers proposing a viticultural area in Alameda County named "Livermore Valley."

In 2006, the 96,000-acre (150 sq mi) Livermore Valley viticultural area expanded its boundaries 163,000 acres (255 sq mi) into northern Alameda County and southern Contra Costa County, approved by the Alcohol and Tobacco Tax and Trade Bureau (TTB), initiated by the petition submitted by the Livermore Valley Winegrowers Association. The TTB also received another petition from the Livermore Valley association proposing to expand the existing San Francisco Bay and Central Coast viticultural areas addressed in a separate final ruling.

== History ==
Livermore Valley's viticultural history began with the planting of vines during the Mission Period (1796–1833). However, at the time, the Valley, part of the Rancho Valle de San José, was more famous for horses than viticulture. The Spanish family names of Bernal, Amador, Pico and Noriega were noted in horse racing circles as far as Mexico City. In 1834, Robert Livermore, an English sailor who deserted ship in 1822, settled in Alta California, became a local businessman and later married a Spanish heiress of the Bernal family. He was a grantee of the Rancho Las Positas in partnership with José Noriega. While Noriega raised horses, Livermore built a large house, planted olives, pears, wheat and the first vines in the valley. He also named the valley after himself.

Wine pioneers arrived in the valley in the late 1860s. By the end of the 1880s the district contained many small, profitable vineyards. The owners, with their diverse backgrounds representing English, German, Irish, Italian, French and Spanish cultures, contributed many viticulture philosophies to the rapidly growing industry. All were attracted by the excellent growing conditions for wine grapes. In 1884, Louis Mel fell in love with the area and purchased land for him and his wife. He built a gravity flow winery into the hillside and planted a vineyard with cuttings from the famed French estates Château d'Yquem and Chateau Margaux. The petitioners claim that emphasis on sauternes began during this period, although there were, and continue to be, many premium red wines from the valley. The resemblance to the Graves District of France was, and is still, a favorite topic for wine writers. At the peak of plantings in the valley, there were approximately 15,000 acres (6,070 ha) of vineyards and over two dozen wineries. The number of both dropped dramatically with the approach and enactment of Prohibition.

Two of the wineries that survived Prohibition, producing sacramental wine, have been in continuous operation, by the same families, since 1883. Louis Mel sold his property to his friend, Ernest Wente in 1940 and the property has been part of the Wente family's estate ever since. As of 2024, there are 17 vineyards cultivating approximately 4,355 acres (1,762 ha) and over 50 wineries.

== Terroir ==
=== Topography ===
Livermore Valley is one of the coastal intermountain valleys that surround the San Francisco Bay depression. The valley floor is approximately 15 by 10 miles (24 km × 16 km). Starting in the east, the watershed area of Livermore Valley is bounded by the Altamont Hills and Crane Ridge, to the south by Cedar Mountain Ridge and Rocky Ridge, in the west by the Pleasanton Ridge, and in the north by the Black Hills. The valley's geographic location is generally the area covered by the political boundaries of Murray and Pleasanton townships. The elevation where the vineyards are cultivated starts at 650–800 feet (198–244 m) above sea level and slopes toward the valley floor to about 450 feet (137 m) above sea level. The main streams in the valley are the Arroyo Mocho, Arroyo Del Valle, and the Arroyo Las Positas which are formed by the watershed run-off of the previously named ridges.

The drainage pattern is well developed with the streams flowing in a westerly direction. These streams converge about one mile west of the town of Pleasanton and form the Arroyo de la Laguna. This stream in turn joins Alameda Creek and empties into San Francisco Bay. Livermore Valley possesses a predominately gravel based soil and lies on a unique east–west orientation, unlike many other winegrowing valleys.

=== Climate ===
Livermore Valley has a moderate coastal climate which is conducive to the growing of grapes, especially the sauterne type grapes and several premium red varieties. The moderate climate is a result of its proximity to the San Francisco Bay and the Pacific Ocean. The cool marine winds and the morning fog are important factors in temperature control during the growing season and in keeping the area relatively frost free during the early spring. The wine grapes grown in Livermore Valley thrive on the cool nights and warmer days. The greatest part of the vineyard acreage is in Region III as classified by the University of California at Davis system of heat summation by degree-days. A small portion of the area within Livermore Valley is classified as Region II. Due to a reliable onshore afternoon/evening breeze off of the San Francisco Bay a wide fluctuation in temperature between sites and a large diurnal temperature swing occur. Livermore Valley is considered a Winkler Region III grape growing zone with temperatures comparable to northern Napa Valley appellations such as St. Helena and Calistoga.

The average rainfall is 14.45 in (367.03 mm). The rain falls mainly during the winter and early spring. There is little or no precipitation during the summer months. With the large increase in population in the Livermore Valley over the past twenty years, the water table has been lowered to a point where the vines no longer are able to depend on a constant water supply from that source. Since the completion of the Del Valle Dam and the filling of the Del Valle Reservoir, both the Arroyo Mocho and Arroyo Del Valle contain water released from the reservoir almost year-round where formerly they were dry by early summer. The South Bay Aqueduct, completed in 1967, provides overhead sprinkler irrigation for some of the vineyards. This type of irrigation is also used for heat suppression and frost protection as well as supplemental watering. The temperature of Livermore Valley is moderate during the winter and moderately high in the summer. The average high is 72.9 °F (22.7 °C) and the average low is 45.3 °F (7.4 °C). Temperatures in the summer have exceeded 100 °F (38 °C) and the lowest temperature recorded in the winter was 19 °F (−7 °C). The extremes rarely last more than a few days before the marine air asserts its normal pattern. The growing season, March through early November, is long enough to assure crop maturity. The average number of growing days is 254. After evaluating the petition and comment, ATF has determined that due to the topographic and climatic features of Livermore Valley, it is distinguishable from the surrounding areas.

=== Soils ===
Soils are a distinguishing feature of the Livermore Valley viticultural area. The main soil type is the Yolo-Pleasanton associations with the Livermore gravelly and very gravelly series being prominent in the southern portion of the valley. The expansion area encompasses a geographical area significantly larger than the current Livermore Valley viticultural area; for both areas, the underlying geologic formations and the geological factors in soil formation are the same. Thus, the soils in the expansion area are consistent with those of the original viticultural area. The original Livermore Valley viticultural area and the expansion area developed on the same geologic formations. Those formations include Pleistocene, alluvial, mostly nonmarine terrace deposits on the basin floor; Pleistocene, Pliocene, Miocene, and Cretaceous sandstone, shale, gravel, and conglomerate in the northern, eastern, and western hills; and Franciscan Complex fragmented and sheared sandstone in the southern hills.

The geological forces that formed the topography and soils in the expansion of the Livermore Valley viticultural area are the same as those that formed the topography and soils of the original Livermore Valley viticultural area. Uplift and subsidence along several earthquake faults (among them, the Calaveras and Pleasanton faults to the west, the Greenwood fault to the east, and the Livermore and Tesla faults in the center of the valley) have shaped the region's topography. Erosion and weathering of base material on the slopes and deposition of sediment carried in runoff onto the valley floor have, over long periods of time, formed the soils of the region.

A portion of the Livermore Valley floor within the current viticultural area also includes the Positas-Perkins association (shallow gravelly loam on terraces) and the Clear Lake-Sunnyvale association (shallow clay in basins and on terraces).

Soils on the slopes of the current viticultural area and recorded in the survey include the Millsholm-Los Gatos-Los Osos association (well drained to excessively drained soils that have low fertility, on moderately sloping to very steep slopes), the Altamont-Diablo association (well drained to excessively drained, clayey soils that have moderate or high fertility, on rolling to steep slopes), and the Vallecitos-Parris association (well drained to excessively drained, shallow loam and gravelly loam on steep or very steep slopes). The Soil Survey of Alameda Area, California and the Soil Survey of Contra Costa County, California, by the United States Department of Agriculture, Soil Conservation Service, published in 1977, both record that the same soils were mapped in the expansion area and in the current viticultural area. Although the Altamont-Diablo and Clearlake-Sunnyvale associations in Alameda County and the Altamont-Diablo-Fontana and Clearlake-Cropley associations in Contra Costa County were mapped along the boundary of the two soil survey areas, the soils are virtually identical. The differences in soil names are the result of improvements in the classification of the soils, particularly modifications or refinements in soil series concepts.

Regarding vineyards, the soils in the expanded Livermore Valley viticultural area are different from those in surrounding areas to the north and east; they are on the only sites where vineyards are suited in the immediate vicinity because of steep terrain, population density, and other limiting factors. To the north and east of the boundary, the soils transition into the Brentwood-Rincon-Zamora association (level, well drained clay and silty clay loam on alluvial fans) and the Marcuse-Solan-Pescadero association (nearly level, poorly drained clay, loam, and clay loam on basin rims). Although suited to vineyards, these soils differ from those in the current Livermore Valley viticultural area and the expansion area.

== Viticulture ==
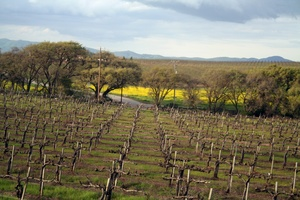
Livermore Valley Vineyard

Viticulture in Livermore Valley has flourished since the 19th century, with the Cresta Blanca Winery, founded in 1882, being one of the earliest, and well-respected vintner, being the first California wine to win an international competition with its initial 1884 vintage awarded the Grand Prix medal at the 1889 Paris Exposition. However, most valley vineyards were shuttered or ripped out during Prohibition except for the Concannon and Wente Vineyards who were limited to produce only sacramental wine.

By the early 1960s, Livermore Valley cultivated the same amount of wine grapes as Napa Valley. Its viticulture achievements remained relatively unknown until Napa Valley gained international prominence at the Paris Wine Tasting of 1976 where California vintages were received top honors in the red and white wine categories by French judges. The unprecedented publicity highlighted Californian viticulture not only in the San Francisco Bay Area, but in Monterey, San Luis Obispo and Santa Barbara counties. Wente Vineyards has long been the largest producer in the Livermore Valley, making around 700,000 cases of wine annually with wholesale, tasting room and export sales. Established in 1883, it's now the oldest family owned winery in the United States. The other valley winery, Concannon Vineyard, was also established in 1883 and their vintages are nationally marketed with a tasting room for direct sales.

The relatively obscure Petite Sirah grape produced Livermore's best historically known red wine, although the climate also produces interesting dessert wines as well as excellent Cabernet Sauvignon, Merlot, Sangiovese, and Rhone varieties. The original plantings of Sémillon and Sauvignon blanc were cuttings originated from Château d'Yquem, and those grapes still produce fine wine in the Livermore area. There is also a move afoot among the wineries in Livermore to specialize in Cabernet Franc, Chardonnay, Sauvignon Blanc, Merlot, Cabernet Sauvignon, and some other mostly Bordeaux varieties. Wine made from grapes grown in the Livermore Valley is eligible for the Livermore Valley AVA, San Francisco Bay AVA, and Central Coast AVA appellation of origin designations. The plant hardiness zone ranges from 9a to 10a.

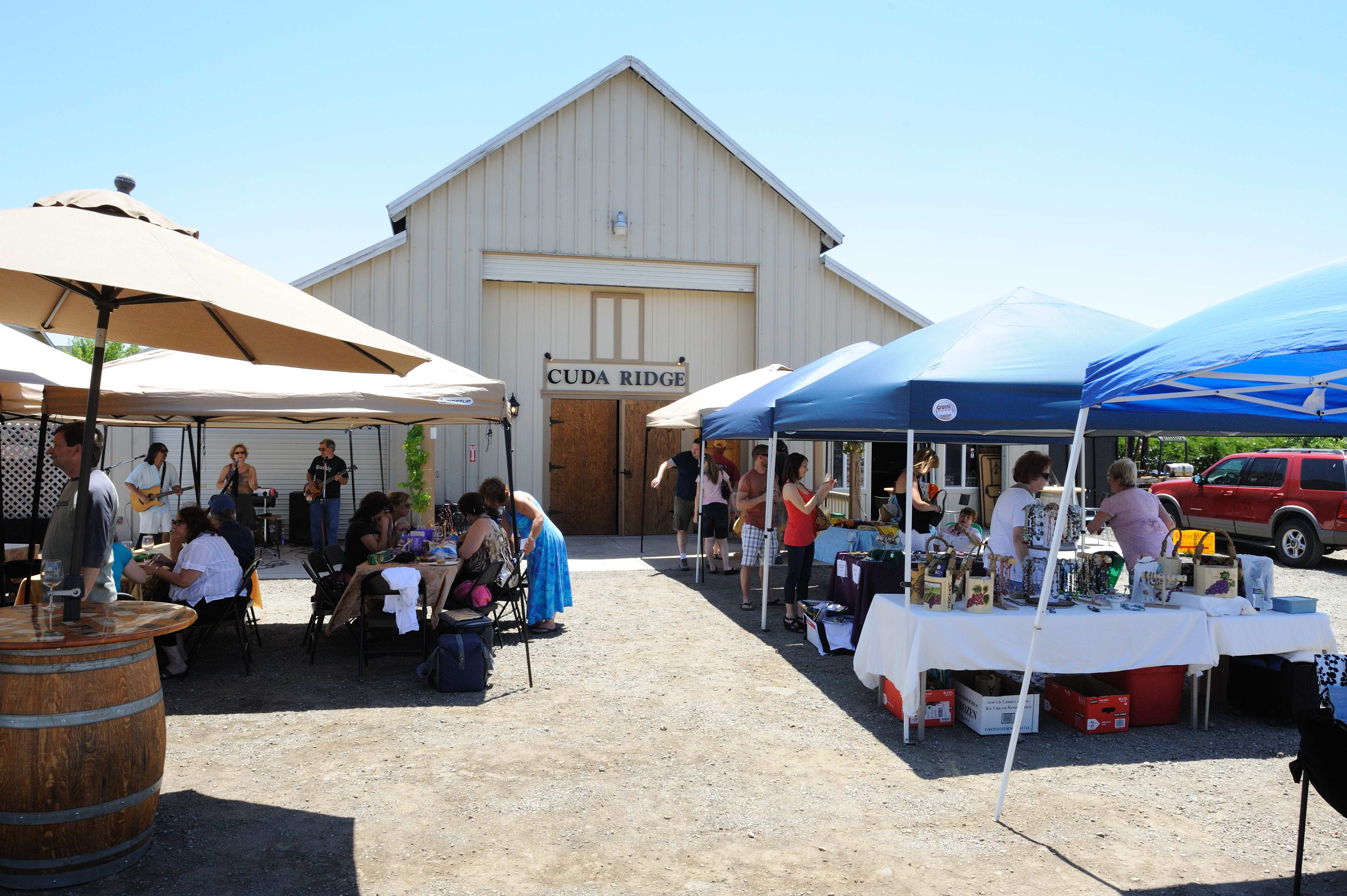
Cuda Ridge Wines

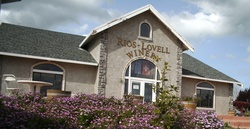
Rios-Lovell Estate Winery

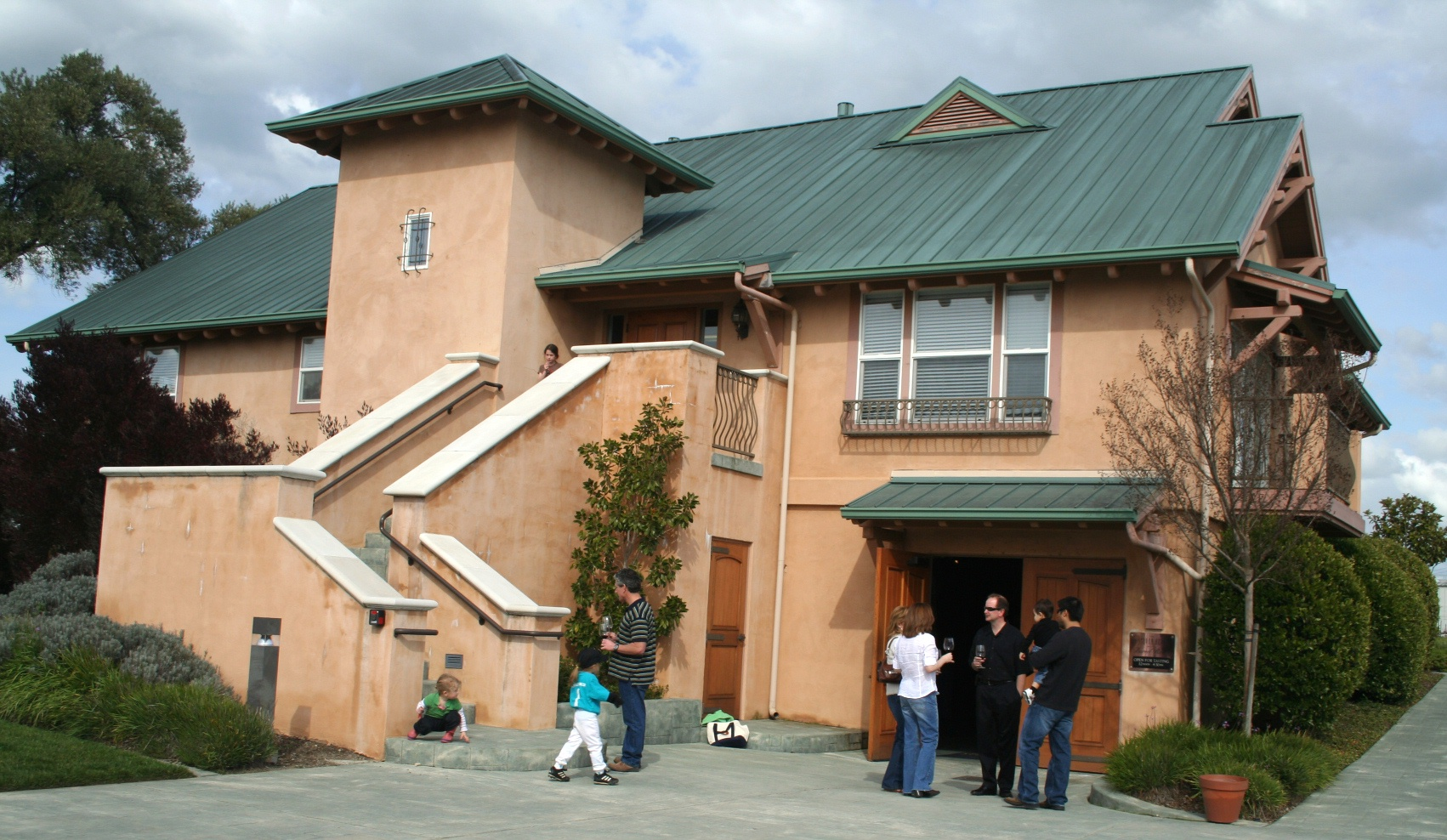
Steven Kent Winery

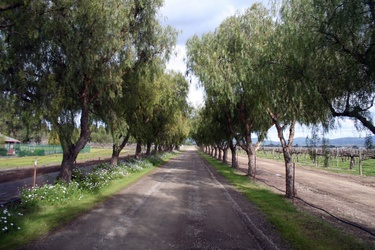
Retzlaff Vineyards Driveway

== See also ==
- Bernal Subbasin
- Mocho Subbasin
- Pleasanton Fault
- Tesla Fault
