= San Ysidro District AVA =

American Viticultural Area in California

Coordinates: 37°01′29″N 121°30′07″W

San Ysidro District
- Wine region
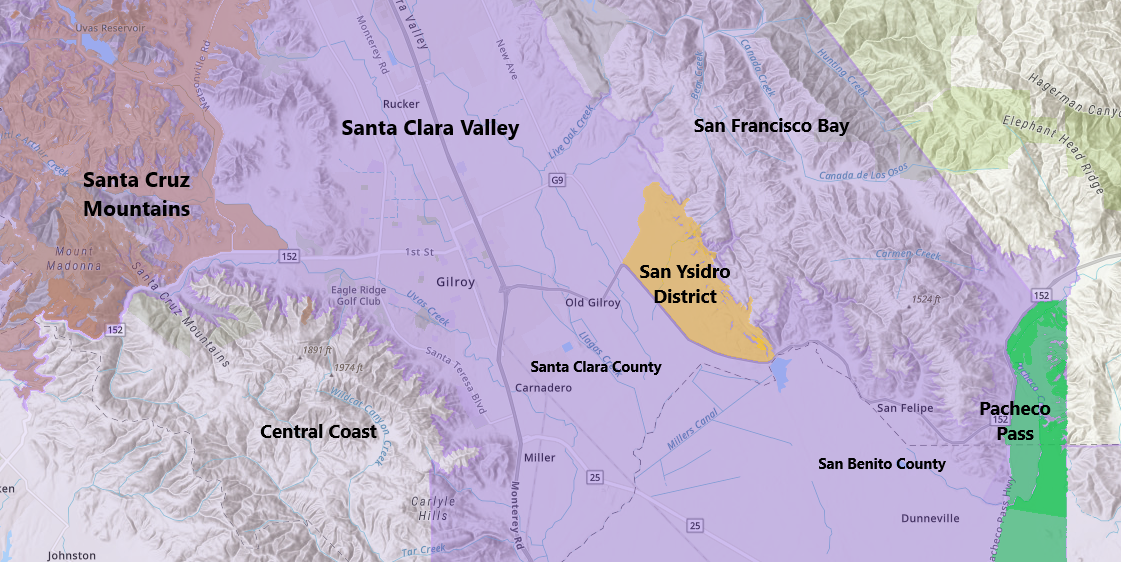
- Type: American Viticultural Area
- Year established: 1990
- Country: United States
- Part of: California, Central Coast AVA, San Francisco Bay AVA, Santa Clara Valley AVA
- Other regions in California, Central Coast AVA, San Francisco Bay AVA, Santa Clara Valley AVA: Pacheco Pass AVA
- Growing season: 256 days
- Climate region: Region I-II
- Heat units: 2,085 GDD units
- Precipitation (annual average): 17 in (428 mm)
- Soil conditions: loamy, with some clay and gravel
- Total area: 2,340 acres (4 sq mi)
- Size of planted vineyards: 520 acres (210 ha)
- No. of vineyards: 3
- Grapes produced: Cabernet Sauvignon, Chardonnay, Chenin Blanc, French Colombard, Merlot, Petite Verdot, Sauvignon Blanc, Semillon, White Riesling
- No. of wineries: 2

San Ysidro District is an American Viticultural Area (AVA) located in southern Santa Clara County, California about four miles (6 km) east of the town of Gilroy. It lies within the larger Santa Clara Valley AVA just east of the Diablo Range foothills. It was established as the nation's 109^{th}, the state's 64^{th} and the county’s fifth appellation on November 15, 1990 by the Bureau of Alcohol, Tobacco and Firearms (ATF), Treasury after reviewing the petition submitted by Mr. Barry Jackson of Harmony Wine Co., on behalf of the owners of the Mistral Vineyard and the San Ysidro Vineyard, proposing a viticultural area to be known as "San Ysidro." The petitioner subsequently amended the petition requesting the name be changed to "San Ysidro District."

The appellation is significantly cooler than other parts of Santa Clara Valley. Cooling breezes can reach the area via the Pajaro River which cuts into the nearby foothills. At the outset, there were two commercial vineyards within the viticultural area, Mistral Vineyard and San Ysidro Vineyard. The two vineyards comprise approximately 520 acres (210 ha) under cultivation. There were five wineries producing vineyard designated wines from the area.

== History ==
The name "San Ysidro" (Spanish pronunciation: [/.sæn iˈsiðɾo/] san-ee-see-droh) is derived from the original Spanish land grant in 1809 or 1810 by Governor José Joaquín de Arrillaga to Ygnacio Ortega (1764–1829), the son of José Francisco Ortega, one of Gaspar de Portola's scouts in the original exploration of California by the Spanish after 1769. The grant is probably named for St. Isidore, the 7th century archbishop of Seville. The rancho was about 13,066 acres (20 sq mi) in size and on Ortega's death in 1833, with Alta California under Mexican rule, Governor José Figueroa divided Rancho Ysidro among his three children, Isabel, Clara, Jose Quintin and their families.
The San Ysidro winegrowing area today is located in the 4,438-acre (7 sq mi) portion that went to the Ortega son, and was clearly identified as such, even after it had been divided and sold off later in the century. It is usually named the Quintin Ortega portion. Following the final patenting of this land in the 1860's, it was sold off in fairly large plots to American settlers. This area grew up as a sort of satellite to the new town of Gilroy that developed in later years. Old Gilroy, or San Ysidro, grew up on the land just north of the Quintin Ortega section and granted to Maria Clara Ortega, the wife of John Gilroy, a Scotsman and one of the first naturalized English-speaking settlers in Alta California. The San Ysidro school was located there.
The dominant agricultural activity there was dairying and by the 1890's Gilroy, the garlic capital of the world, had developed a great reputation for its cheese production, particularly from the San Ysidro area where five families had all had dairies. This emphasis continued for years and was listed as Gilroy's claim to fame when the San Jose Mercury published its beautiful book on the county in 1895, "Gilroy's principal product is cheese, the succulent grasses which flourish along the creeks and in the low lands... having brought about the development of the industry." Fully one fifth of California cheese production, well over one million pounds (453,592 kg), came from Gilroy, and at least half of the producers listed by the Mercury had their facilities along Pacheco Pass Road in the San Ysidro area. From 1876 to the early 1930's, although dairying remained important, some orchards and vineyards were planted.
Beginning in the late 1930's, increased awareness of the benefits of a cool climate in the growing of premium white varietals led to a gradual increase in the amount of land on which grapes were commercially grown. The continuity of these land holdings along Pacheco Pass Road can be seen on large maps from 1914 and 1932 in the archives of the Gilroy Historical Museum. After the turn of the century, some more orchardry came into the area, also mostly on the east side of the Pacheco Pass Road. These were mostly prunes and apricots between 1900 and 1915. Walnuts began to be more important here in the 1920's along the higher slopes to the east of the road. Some walnut trees persist there to this day above the vineyards to the west, on the lower slopes. But the agricultural personality of the area continued to indicate the primary importance of the dairy interest. While the rest of the southern part of the Valley exploded in a paroxysm of vineyard planting between 1920 and 1924, there seems to have been no attempt to convert the San Ysidro slopes to wine grapes. Some vineyards had been planted after the turn of the century in the northern portion of the old San Ysidro Rancho. There now enter the picture and become the first part of the new focus in land use that would begin developing after Prohibition.
In 1932, the Bruno Filice family purchased the San Martin Winery, already having begun the acquisition of numerous vineyard parcels in the Valley. They also purchased grapes from many Valley sources. Among these were the two vineyards in the northern San Ysidro area. One was the vineyard planted by J.A. Roberschotte, an Italian-Swiss who came to California in 1878 from Australia. He died in 1915 and his son, John, continued to operate the vineyard on into the days after the Repeal. The Roberschotte vineyard supplied the Filices with grapes from twelve acres (5 ha) of Carignane for several years. The other San Ysidro vineyard was nearby on Crews Road, on land broken by Matthew Fellom, a Danish seaman on a whaling ship, who came to California in 1822 and later worked for John Gilroy. From the Fellom Vineyard, the Filices bought Carignane and Zinfandel for their San Martin table wines.

In the late 1930's the pattern that today marks viticulture in the San Ysidro area began to form. The Cribari family, which already owned extensive vineyard property in the Valley and wineries in Madrone and Evergreen, acquired portions of the old H. S. Jones and J. Doan plots, east of Pacheco Pass Road, and began planting wine grapes, particularly French Colombard. There was a shortage of good white varieties in the Valley and the Cribaris meant to make up for this scarcity with these plantings. Within a few years about two-thirds of what today is termed Mistral Vineyards had been planted. It now began to appear that this "cold ground" across the Pajaro gap might have a special viticultural character, particularly in terms of white wine production. But as yet the concept was not totally clear. After the war the Filice family also decided to take advantage of the special possibilities here and began, through several purchases, to piece back together much of what had been the J. H. Ellis plot, east of Pacheco Road. With aid from U.C. Davis experts, the Filices also began planting white varieties, at first 40 acres (16 ha) of French Colombard and some Palomino. U.C. Davis approved of the soil here on the east side of the road and over the next few years more white varieties, particularly White Riesling, Sauvignon Blanc, Pinot Blanc, Semillon and Malvasia Bianca, went in. They also planted Cabernet Sauvignon and Pinot Noir in the 1950's. Over the years the Filices used these premium grapes in their varietal wines that became particularly popular in the 1960's at their world famous tasting room next to the San Martin Winery, a few miles north of Gilroy on Highway 101.
By the 1960's the special climatic qualities of the San Ysidro area had become understood. It was clear that maritime influence in this area of the southern Santa Clara Valley was of particular importance in growing premium white varietals. It was found that the San Ysidro area could claim a U.C. Davis Region I-II rating virtually every year, an important contrast to the warmer area to the north, which was closer to the Bay but less under true maritime influences. The area to the north generally rated a Region II-III designation and was far less valuable for growing many premium white varietals. By the 1970's the Filice family had pulled up most of the lesser varieties earlier planted, such as Ruby Cabernet and Emerald Riesling, which were not tending to ripen properly in the cool environment. By now the Filices had added Chardonnay to their vineyards here. Meanwhile next door, at what is today Mistral Vineyards, another important change had been taking place. After careful study of the vineyard land available, Paul Masson Vineyards, in 1956, purchased the 333 acres (135 ha) plot. This was done after consultation with U.C. Davis experts and with the clear understanding that the San Ysidro area had become an important potential source for future Paul Masson varietal wines. White wine production, particularly in the German style, was viewed by the Masson leaders, such as Otto Meyer and Alfred Fromm, as an important part of this move. The author also interviewed Meyer (12/20/1984) and Fromm (8/16/1984) as part of his research on the history of the Paul Masson wine operations. Within a few years wine writers had begun associating the San Ysidro vineyards with the success of Paul Masson's premium wine operations.

== Terroir ==
=== Geography and Climate ===
The San Ysidro District is entirely within the Santa Clara Valley viticultural area which was established in 1989. The area lies to the east of the town of Gilroy on the eastern edge of the Santa Clara Valley and in the Diablo Range foothills. The San Ysidro Creek runs through the vineyards and is part of the upper watershed for the Pajaro River. This proximity to the Pajaro River and the resultant effect on the micro-climate at San Ysidro is the primary factor distinguishing this area from the rest of the Santa Clara Valley. The Pajaro Gap and Chittenden Pass, through which the river flows, act as a funnel for cool maritime air being pulled into the San Joaquin Valley through the Pacheco Pass. Because of the cool ocean air flowing over the area, fog in the San Ysidro District area is subject to earlier accumulation in the evening and later burn-off in the morning than in the surrounding area. This maritime influence also results in afternoon breezes that moderate the daily high temperature, even during summer months. The average temperature, due to the marine influence, is 2085 degree-days. This corresponds to a Region I climate, based on the University of California-Davis heat summation method. Much of the Santa Clara Valley area is classified as a Region II climate, based on 2700 degree-days. Even the nearby town of Gilroy is substantially warmer, at 2630 degree-days. The USDA plant hardiness zones are 9a and 9b.

=== Soils ===
The soil is loamy, with some clay and gravel, and is generally well drained. The primary soil associations in the lower slopes are the Zamora-Pleasanton-San Ysidro loams. The soil associations in the upland-foothill areas are the Azule-Altamont-Los Gatos-Gaviota complexes. By contrast, the soil of the Santa Clara Valley, the approved viticultural area within which the San Ysidro District is located, is composed primarily of the Yolo and Zamora-Arbuckle-Pleasanton Associations.

== Viticulture Industry ==
In recent years the two large vineyard holdings of the San Ysidro area have passed into new hands, but the intensity of interest in high premium varietals and that area's special viticultural qualities has not waned. This can be seen by examining the 1978 vintage at Mistral, then still under Masson control. The vines planted on the 211 acres (85 ha) in production still had no less than 28 acres (11 ha) classified as "mixed blacks" and 42.5 acres (17 ha) termed "mixed whites," clearly a holdover from the Cribari days. There were 20 acres (8 ha) of Chenin Blanc, which still stand and were planted by Masson in 1963. But there were but three acres of Chardonnay. Today there are 96 acres (39 ha) of Chardonnay, a large part of which goes to Livermore's Concannon Winery. In fact, only the Chenin Blanc and about 35 acres of Pinot Noir have been saved from the Masson days. Of particular interest, so far as premium production is concerned, is the growing number of small premium operations that have been turning to the vineyards at San Ysidro for quality grapes in recent years. Congress Springs, one of the brightest quality stars of the Santa Cruz Mountains appellation, has been buying grapes there since 1982. They have purchased Chardonnay, Semillon, White Riesling, and Sauvignon Blanc. Of particular importance is the Congress Springs use of the San Ysidro Chardonnay, Pinot Blanc and Pinot Noir to produce a méthode champenoise sparkling wine. Congress Springs points proudly to the many gold medals it has won with wines made from San Ysidro grapes. Concannon's Livermore neighbor, Fenestra Vineyards, has also been using San Ysidro grapes. Another quality Santa Cruz Mountains winery, Sunrise, has recently used San Ysidro Pinot Blanc, Pinot Noir and Chardonnay.
It is clear that the peculiar history of the San Ysidro winegrowing area has turned in recent years on the gradual recognition that the good soil, and particularly, the cooling maritime influence are ideal for the production of premium varietals that thrive in such an environment. Fifty years ago this was not understood, when the prejudice against "cold ground" coincided with the popular viticultural view that higher sugars were the key to success. Today no such prejudice obtains and the San Ysidro area now stands out fairly obviously for its premium winegrowing record and its potential.
