= Pacheco Pass AVA =

Appellation that designates wine in Santa Clara County, California

Coordinates: 37°00′31″N 121°21′36″W

Pacheco Pass
- Wine region
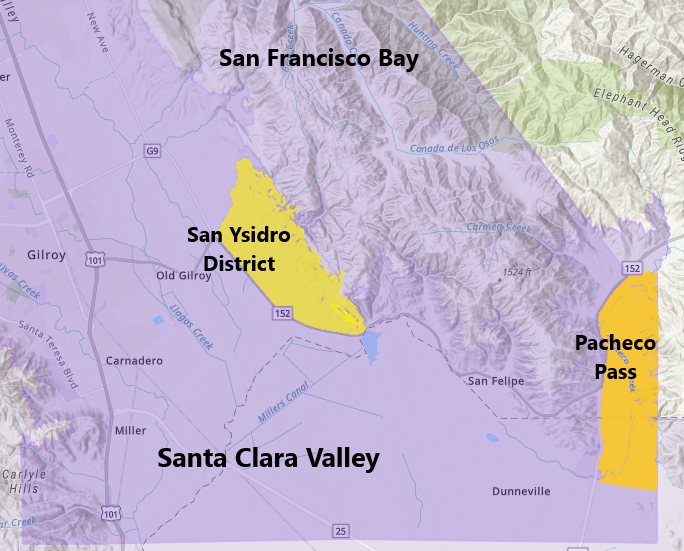
- Type: American Viticultural Area
- Year established: 1984
- Years of wine industry: 118
- Country: United States
- Part of: California, Central Coast AVA, San Francisco Bay AVA, Santa Clara Valley AVA
- Other regions in California, Central Coast AVA, San Francisco Bay AVA, Santa Clara Valley AVA: San Ysidro District AVA
- Growing season: 256 days
- Precipitation (annual average): less than 10 in (254 mm)
- Total area: 3,200 acres (5 sq mi)
- Size of planted vineyards: 1984: 17 acres (7 ha)
- No. of vineyards: 2
- Grapes produced: Black Muscat, Cabernet Sauvignon, Chardonnay, Gewurztraminer, Merlot, Zinfandel
- No. of wineries: 1

Pacheco Pass is an American Viticultural Area (AVA) located in the Santa Clara and San Benito counties of California. It was established as the nation's 60^{th}, the state's 38^{th}, San Benito County's fifth and Santa Clara County's second appellation on March 12, 1984 by the Bureau of Alcohol, Tobacco and Firearms (ATF), Treasury after evaluating the petition submitted by Mr. H.G. Zanger of Pacheco Pass Vineyard, later renamed "Zanger Vineyards", proposing a viticultural area near Hollister, California known as "Pacheco Pass."

In 1989 and 1999, the AVA became a sub-appellation within the larger Santa Clara Valley and San Francisco Bay viticultural areas, respectively. The wine region is located at the southern entrance to Pacheco Pass, near the junction of State Routes 152, known locally as "Pacheco Pass Highway," and 156 which passes across the length of the acreage. At the outset, there were about 17 acres (7 ha) of cultivation and one operating bonded winery. The petitioner proposed new construction of a winery and additional vineyard acreage on land he currently owned.

== History ==
The region is named after Don Francisco Perez Pacheco (/pəˈtʃeɪkoʊ/ pah-CHAY-koh) who received a 150,000 acres (234 sq mi) land grant in 1843 from the Mexican Government. The name of the land grant was "Rancho Pacheco," and the nearby pass over the Diablo Range took the name "Pacheco Pass." Agriculture was developed along Pacheco Pass in the mid-1800s as settlers began to develop ranches primarily raising cattle and other livestock. In 1908, the Zanger Family began planting their orchards and vineyards in Pacheco Pass.

== Terroir ==
Pacheco Pass is a cut through the Diablo Range and has an approximate total length of 15 miles (24 km). Pacheco Pass viticultural area occupies only the southern one-third of the total length, extending about 5 miles (8 km) with a width of about 1 mile (2 km) encompassing approximately 3,200 acres (5 sq mi). The northern part is unsuitable for viticulture due to shallow, rocky soil. The northern part is also cooler, wetter, and subject to higher winds than the viticultural area. The topography in the Pacheco Pass is characterized by gently rolling hills. Wind is sucked into the area through the Pajaro River Gap, which exposes it to the cold waters of Monterey Bay in the west, but the area also feels warming influences from the hot Central Valley that lies across the Diablo Hills in the east. The viticultural area is in a valley and generally has flat or gently sloping terrain, whereas to the east and west lie the rugged hills of the Diablo Range. Those hills are too steep for viticulture and are also distinguishable on the basis of soil types. To the south, the viticultural area is distinguishable from the surrounding area on the basis of both soil and climate. South of the boundaries of the viticultural area, the land is afflicted with high-perched water tables which restrict drainage and boron salts which affect the quality of water. In contrast, the Pacheco Pass viticultural area is free from these defects, having a very good water table and good quality water from Pacheco Creek. Further, the viticultural area has more rainfall than the Hollister Basin to the south, and it enjoys more moderate temperatures due to winds moving through Pacheco Pass en route to the San Joaquin Valley. The USDA plant hardiness zone is 9b.
