= Black Hills (disambiguation) =

Black Hills may refer to:

== Places ==
- Black Hills in South Dakota and Wyoming
  - Black Hills Airport in Spearfish, South Dakota
  - Black Hills Gold Rush in South Dakota from 1874 to 1877
  - Black Hills National Forest in South Dakota and Wyoming
  - Black Hills Playhouse, a theater in South Dakota
  - Black Hills State University in Spearfish, South Dakota
- In California:
  - Black Hills (Contra Costa County)
  - Black Hills (Imperial County)
  - Black Hills (Kern County)
  - Black Hills (Riverside County)
  - Black Hills (San Bernardino County)
- In Arizona
  - Black Hills (Greenlee County)
  - Black Hills (Yavapai County)
- Black Hills (Oregon)
- Black Hills (Washington)
- Black Hills, Tasmania, a locality in Australia

== Other ==
- Black Hills (1929 film), a silent American film directed by Norman Dawn
- Black Hills (1947 film), an American western film directed by Ray Taylor
- Black Hills Ammunition
- "Black Hills", a song by Scale the Summit from the album The Collective
- Black Hills, a 2010 novel by Dan Simmons
- "The Black Hills of Dakota" (song), a song from the musical Calamity Jane

== See also ==
- Black Hill (disambiguation)
- Black Mountains (disambiguation)
- Black Mountain (disambiguation)
- Black Rock (disambiguation)
- All articles beginning with Black Hills
