= Blackhill =

Blackhill may refer to:

- Blackhill, Consett, an area in Consett, County Durham, England
- Blackhill, Glasgow, an area of Glasgow, Scotland
- Blackhill, Aberdeenshire, a small Scottish village passed through by A952 road
- Blackhill, County Fermanagh, a townland in County Fermanagh, Northern Ireland
- Blackhill, County Londonderry, a townland in County Londonderry, Northern Ireland
- Blackhill and Consett Park, a park in Consett, County Durham, England
- Blackhill, Scottish television drama production label of STV Studios

== See also ==
- Black Hill (disambiguation)
- Black Hills (disambiguation)
