= Contra Costa AVA =

Wine grape-growing region in the San Francisco Bay Area, California, U.S.

Coordinates: 38°00′19″N 122°06′04″W

Contra Costa
- Wine region
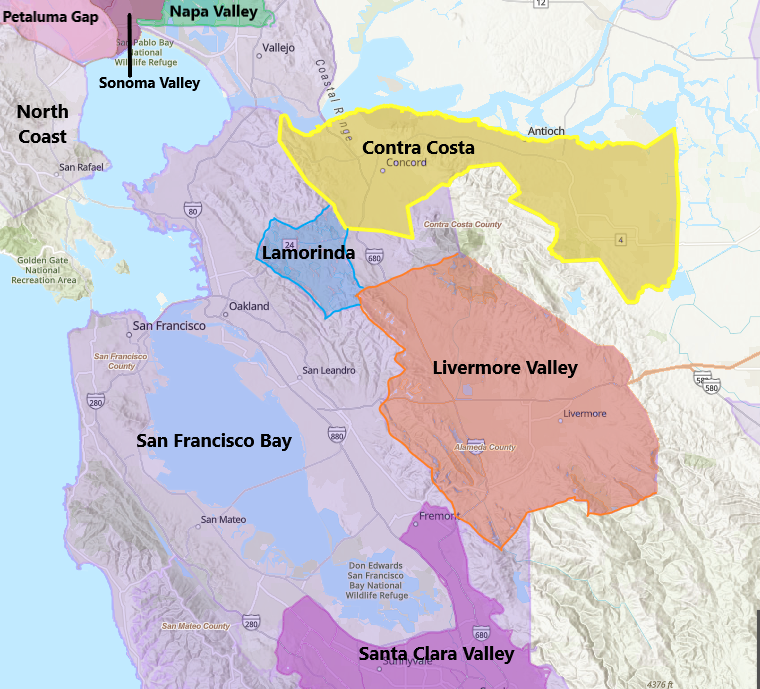
- Type: American Viticultural Area
- Year established: 2024
- Years of wine industry: 180
- Country: United States
- Part of: California, Central Coast AVA, San Francisco Bay AVA
- Other regions in California, Central Coast AVA, San Francisco Bay AVA: Livermore Valley AVA, Santa Clara Valley AVA, Lamorinda AVA
- Climate region: Region III-V
- Heat units: 3,008–4,275 GDD
- Precipitation (annual average): 9 to 22 in (232–565 mm)
- Total area: 167,146 acres (261 sq mi)
- Size of planted vineyards: 1,700 acres (688 ha)
- No. of vineyards: 60
- Varietals produced: Carignane, Chardonnay, Cabernet Sauvignon, Malbec,Mourvedre, Petite Sirah, Syrah, Viognier, Zinfandel
- No. of wineries: 14

Contra Costa is an American Viticultural Area (AVA) located in the San Francisco Bay Area of Northern California. It lies east of San Pablo Bay in Contra Costa County on the southern banks of the Carquinez Strait encompassing the area around the cities of Concord, Martinez, Pittsburg, Antioch and Brentwood. It was established as the nation's 270^{th}, the state's 150^{th} and the county's fifth appellation on March 15, 2024 by the Alcohol and Tobacco Tax and Trade Bureau (TTB), Treasury after reviewing the petition submitted by Patrick Shabram on behalf of the Contra Costa Winegrowers Association proposing a viticultural area named "Contra Costa."

Upon careful review of the petition and the submitted comments, TTB found the evidence provided by the petitioner supported the establishment of the 167,146-acre (261 sq mi) Contra Costa AVA and the expansion of the San Francisco Bay and Central Coast viticultural areas boundaries by approximately 109,955 acres (172 sq mi) avoiding a boundary overlap and entirely encompass Contra Costa AVA. As of 2024, the AVA contains at least 14 wineries and 60 commercial vineyards cultivating about 1,700 acres (688 ha) under vine. The most commonly grown grape varietal is Zinfandel, but other varieties grown in Contra Costa include Petite Sirah, Mourvedre, Chardonnay and Cabernet Sauvignon.

== Name evidence ==
Contra Costa AVA takes its name from its location within Contra Costa County, California. The Spanish phrase "contra costa" translates to "opposite coast," which is a reference to the county's northeastern location across San Francisco Bay from the city of San Francisco. Prior to Prohibition, Contra Costa County was one of the Bay Area's leading winegrowing regions where the grapes from its vineyards with the reputation for having their own "Contra Costa style," described as an "earthy, dusty and leathery quality" attributed to the "defining terroir" of the region. The petition included multiple examples of the use of the name "Contra Costa" to describe the region. For example, the Contra Costa Water District supplies water to customers within the county. Non-profit agencies serving the area include Contra Costa Humane Society, Contra Costa Senior Legal Services, Meals on Wheels of Contra Costa, and Sustainable Contra Costa. Other businesses within the AVA include Contra Costa Hardwood Floor Service, Alameda Contra Costa Fire Extinguisher Equipment Company, Contra Costa Farms LLC, Contra Costa Cinema, Contra Costa Country Club, Contra Costa Auto Sales, and Contra Costa Powersports.

== History ==
The Contra Costa region has a longstanding viticulture history. The first vines were planted in Brentwood in 1846. Between 1860 and 1890, three primary grape-growing areas in the county emerged: the Mt. Diablo area, the Martinez area, and the Oakley area. All of the Martinez and Oakley areas, and most of the Mt. Diablo area (which includes Concord, Pleasant Hill, Walnut Creek, and parts of Clayton), lie within the Contra Costa AVA. By 1916, Contra Costa County was home to 6,000 acres (2,428 ha) of grapes with 2,700,000 individual vines. A 1908 letter to the editor in the Pacific Rural Press confirms central Contra Costa County as the largest production center in Contra Costa County stating: "I write to inform your readers that the wine grape crop in this, the central part of Contra Costa county, is very short this year…. This conclusion is the result of careful investigation in the Concord, Clayton and Walnut Creek sections —the largest wine producing sections of this county." At the time when the Viano family purchased the existing vineyards in the Vine Hill area in 1920, there were fifteen wineries in Vine Hill. While vineyards in Antioch, Oakley, Brentwood and at Vine Hill in Martinez survived Prohibition, most of Contra Costa's vineyards did not. Nevertheless, Viano Vineyards is now run by fourth and fifth-generation members of the Viano family. Cline Cellars, now based in Sonoma-Carneros but founded in Oakley, has sourced fruit from Oakley-area vineyards since 1982, along with other wineries that have continued to use the original Antioch/Oakley/Brentwood area vines. Fred Cline notes helping his grandfather produce wine on his Oakley farm prior to founding Cline Cellars in 1981. More contemporary plantings started in earnest in the 1990s with Bloomfield Vineyards and Hannah Nicole Vineyards among the first with new plantings. Some of the larger, more recent plantings by the Nunn family, the Tamayo Family, Petersen Vineyards, the Campos family, and others mostly occurred in and around the communities of Brentwood, Byron, Knightsen and Oakley. Urbanization has limited the size, but not stopped, more contemporary plantings in and around Martinez. Aside from additional plantings at Viano Vineyards, plantings at three contemporary vineyards have been developed just west of Martinez. Shadowbrook Winery was established in 2005 in Walnut Creek at the foot of Mount Diablo. In 2011, a group of growers who had been meeting informally for several years prior established the Contra Costa Winegrowers Association to recognize the winegrowing region. The association currently includes thirteen winery members and four vineyards members. The association also has nineteen associate members and taster members, companies and individuals that recognize and support Contra Costa as a distinctive viticulture region.

== Terroir ==
=== Topography ===
Contra Costa AVA consists of relatively flat terrain interrupted in places by rolling hills. Most of the terrain has elevations below 100 ft (30 m), and nearly all of the AVA is below 1,000 ft (305 m). Slope angles are typically less than 5 percent, but can reach up to 30 percent in some of the hills along the western and southern boundary and in the ridgeline that runs north–south between Concord and Bay Point. Although some areas of steep slopes are included in the AVA in order to simplify the boundary, the petition states that over 71 percent of the AVA has slopes with less than 5 percent grade, and 78 percent of the AVA has slopes with less than 10 percent grade. The petition states that cool, heavy marine air stays at lower elevations, leading to diurnal cooling. Areas at higher elevations are above the layer of marine air and experience less cooling. Differences in temperatures can cause differences in grape development, the timing of harvest, and sugar accumulation and acidity in the grapes. East of the AVA, the terrain is generally flat as one moves into the California Delta and the San Joaquin Valley. To the south and west of the AVA, the terrain becomes steeper, with slope angles generally exceeding 20 percent and commonly above 30 percent. Elevations to the west and south of the AVA are also generally higher than within the AVA, exceeding 1,300 ft (396 m) in the region to the west and reaching 3,849 ft (1,173 m) at the summit of Mt. Diablo to the south of the AVA.

=== Climate ===
The petition provided information about the climate of the Contra Costa AVA. According to the petition, the warm days, cool afternoon breezes and nightly temperature drops causes a significant diurnal temperature shift that affects the character of the grapes grown and the resulting wine, creating a "definitive Contra Costa style" that is characterized by an "earthy, dusty and leathery quality." Climate data included growing degree day (GDD) accumulations, average annual precipitation amounts, average growing season, maximum temperatures and the average minimum temperatures within the AVA and the surrounding regions. However, because the temperature data was from only 2 years, TTB was unable to determine if maximum and minimum temperatures are a distinguishing feature of the AVA, and the information is not included in this rule making document. To the east, within the San Joaquin Valley, GDD accumulations are generally warmer than within the AVA, as the marine influence decreases as one moves farther inland. West of the AVA, as one moves closer to San Francisco Bay and the Pacific Ocean, GDD accumulations are lower than within the AVA. GDD accumulations west of the AVA range from 1,848 at El Cerrito which is adjacent to San Francisco Bay, to 3,469 at Briones Regional Park, which is further inland and closer to the Contra Costa AVA. Within the AVA, GDD accumulations range from 3,008 to 4,275, Region III-V on the Winkler scale, and average annual precipitation amounts range from 9 to 22 in (232–565 mm). The precipitation data shows that the Contra Costa AVA received less rainfall than the regions to the west and southwest.
