= Lamorinda AVA =

Wine grape-growing region in the San Francisco Bay Area, California, U.S.

Coordinates: 37.88576°N 122.11802°W

Lamorinda
- Wine region
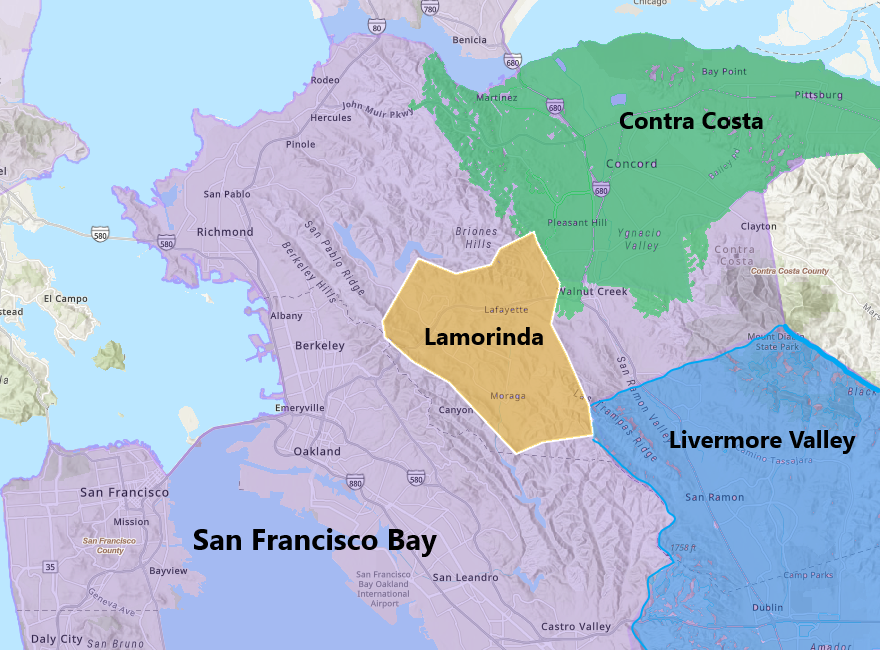
- Type: American Viticultural Area
- Year established: 2016
- Years of wine industry: 166
- Country: United States
- Part of: California, Central Coast AVA, San Francisco Bay AVA
- Other regions in California, Central Coast AVA, San Francisco Bay AVA: Livermore Valley AVA, Santa Clara Valley AVA, Contra Costa AVA
- Climate region: Region II-III
- Heat units: 2,816–3,225 GDD
- Soil conditions: Thin clay-rich Orinda formation
- Total area: 30,000 acres (47 sq mi).
- Size of planted vineyards: 139 acres (56 ha)
- No. of vineyards: 46
- Varietals produced: Cabernet Franc, Cabernet Sauvignon, Chardonnay, Chenin Blanc, Grenache, Petite Sirah, Petit Verdot, Pinot Noir, Syrah
- No. of wineries: 6

Lamorinda is an American Viticultural Area (AVA) in the San Francisco Bay Area located due east of the Berkeley Hills in Contra Costa County encompassing the region around the cities of Lafayette, Moraga and Orinda. The name Lamorinda (/ˌlæməˈrɪndə/ Sluh-MOR-in-duh) is a portmanteau from the names of the three locales defining the region: Lafayette, Moraga, and Orinda. It was established as the nation's 233^{rd}, the state's 147^{th} and the county's fourth appellation on February 24, 2016 by the Alcohol and Tobacco Tax and Trade Bureau (TTB), Treasury after reviewing the petition submitted by Patrick L. Shabram, on behalf of the Lamorinda Wine Growers Association, proposing the viticultural area named "Lamorinda."
The AVA is a sub-region within the existing San Francisco Bay AVA and the larger, multi-county Central Coast AVA encompassing approximately 30,000 acres (47 sq mi) with, at the outset, 46 commercially-producing vineyards cultivating approximately 139 acres (56 ha) sourcing six bonded wineries with plans for three more. The appellation was proposed as the growers in the area found the wider San Francisco Bay and Central Coast AVA titles too generic and not indicative of its terroir.

== History ==
Commercial grape and wine production in the Lamorinda area dates back over 150 years. A directory by Ernest P. Peninou, a well-known wine historian, and Sidney S. Greenleaf shows local growers John Grinnell, Daniel Hunsacker, Isaac Hunsaker, and William B. Rodgers collectively had 623 US gal (2,358.3 L) of wine on hand during an 1860 census. All growers within this census are listed as "Lafayette and Alamo." Although the current city of Alamo lies outside the Lamorinda viticultural area, Lafayette clearly had an early association with viticulture. Beginning in 1907, Serafino Rossi grew wine grapes commercially at a site currently occupied by Reliez Valley Vineyards in Lafayette, according to research conducted in the archives of the Lafayette Historical Society. Based on additional research conducted in the archives of the Moraga Historical Society and Orinda Historical Society, wine grapes were one of many crops grown by early settlers. The Trelut brothers, who settled in Moraga in 1880, planted grapes and made wine on a relatively large scale. By 1897, Theodore Wagner was commercially growing grapes in the Orinda area. While some grapes were made into wine locally, most were shipped out of the area, with much of the production apparently sold to immigrant Italians in the North Beach area of San Francisco. None of these early vineyards survive today, although, as mentioned above, there is currently a vineyard and winery on the site of the original Rossi vineyard. The agricultural focus of the area was gradually replaced by suburban housing development, but a renaissance of small-scale wine production began in the late 1970s. These plantings started with John Alegria, who planted one thousand vines in Moraga in 1978. The number of plantings has accelerated in recent years and led to the founding of the Lamorinda Wine Growers Association in 2005. The first bonded winery, Parkmon Vineyards, was also established in 2005 in Moraga.

== Terroir ==
The distinguishing features of the Lamorinda area are its topography, geology, soils, and climate. The terrain is composed of moderate-to-steep hills with narrow valleys. The steep hillsides prevent the use of machinery for vineyard work instead requiring the work to be done manually. The terrain contrasts with the steeper, more rugged terrain to the south and west and the lower, flatter plains to the north and east. Additionally, Lamorinda AVA is characterized by a distinct suburban land use pattern which tends to provide property owners with enough room to plant vineyards large enough for commercial viticulture. This contrasts with the more urban and densely populated areas to the east and west. The dominant geological formation is the Orinda Formation, while the Briones and Mulholland Formations are also present. These underlying geological formations affect viticulture due to their role in forming the soils of the region. Other geographic formations dominate the surrounding areas. The AVA is suitable for both cool and warm-climate varietals because the hilly terrain results in disparate levels of sunlight at different elevations. The Berkeley Hills affect the local climate by their elevation. The oceanic marine layer, which develops during the summer, bringing fog and low clouds with it, is usually less than 2,000 feet (610 m) deep and thus is blocked by the range. This produces a "fog shadow" effect to the east, which is warmer than areas west of the hills. The westerly wind that carries the marine layer through the Golden Gate typically splits its flow as it hits the Berkeley Hills producing a southerly wind from Berkeley northward and a northerly wind in the direction of Oakland. In winter during spells of tule fog inland, a reverse situation occurs, with the fog usually confined to areas east of the hills. Rainfall is also affected by the higher elevations when westerly winds from the Pacific are perpendicular to the hills during a storm and forced to rise, cooling and condensing additional moisture, increasing the precipitation on the western slopes but leaving areas east of the hills drier. The USDA plant hardiness zone ranges from 9b to 10a.

== Community Industry ==
The wine industry from the Lamorinda region, including vineyard owners, winemakers, and retail wine shop proprietors supported the establishment of the AVA due to the unique microclimates, soils, and geology of the region. It is far from being a commercial winegrowing area, instead hosting a number of small home wineries making just enough wine to satisfy the local demand. There is a strong sense of community identity and commitment in Lamorinda to help consumers identify and buy its local wines. The Lamorinda Wine Growers Association (LWGA) is dedicated to providing education and support resulting in the production of high-quality grapes and wine in an environmentally friendly and socially responsible fashion; promoting the Lamorinda community and its status as a winegrowing region, enhancing the marketability of Lamorinda-grown grapes and Lamorinda-made wine; and cultivate a strong relationship with the local community.
