= Black Mountains =

Black Mountains may refer to:

== Asia ==
- Black Mountains (Bhutan)
- Kirana Hills, Pakistan

== Europe ==
- Black Mountain (range), Wales
- Black Mountains (Caucasus), Russia
- Black Mountains (Rhön), Germany
- Black Mountains, Wales and England
- Montagne Noire, in central southern France
- Montagnes Noires, in Brittany, France
- Svartfjella, Svalbard, Norway

== North America ==
- Black Mountains (Arizona)
- Black Mountains (Yavapai County, Arizona), in the Poachie Range
- Black Mountains (California)
- Black Mountains (Nevada)
- Black Mountains (North Carolina)
- Black Mountains (Utah)

== See also ==
- Black Hill (disambiguation)
- Black Hills (disambiguation)
- Black Mountain (disambiguation)
- Black Rock (disambiguation)
