= Wente =

Wente is a surname. Notable people with the surname include:

- Bob Wente (1933-2000), American racecar driver
- Edward Frank Wente (born 1930), American Egyptologist and professor emeritus
- Henry C. Wente - mathematician
- Margaret Wente (born 1950), Canadian newspaper columnist
- Susan Rae Wente (born 1962), American cell biologist and Provost at Vanderbilt University

== See also ==
- Wente Vineyards, a winery in Livermore, California
- Wente torus, in differential geometry
