= Cresta Blanca Winery =

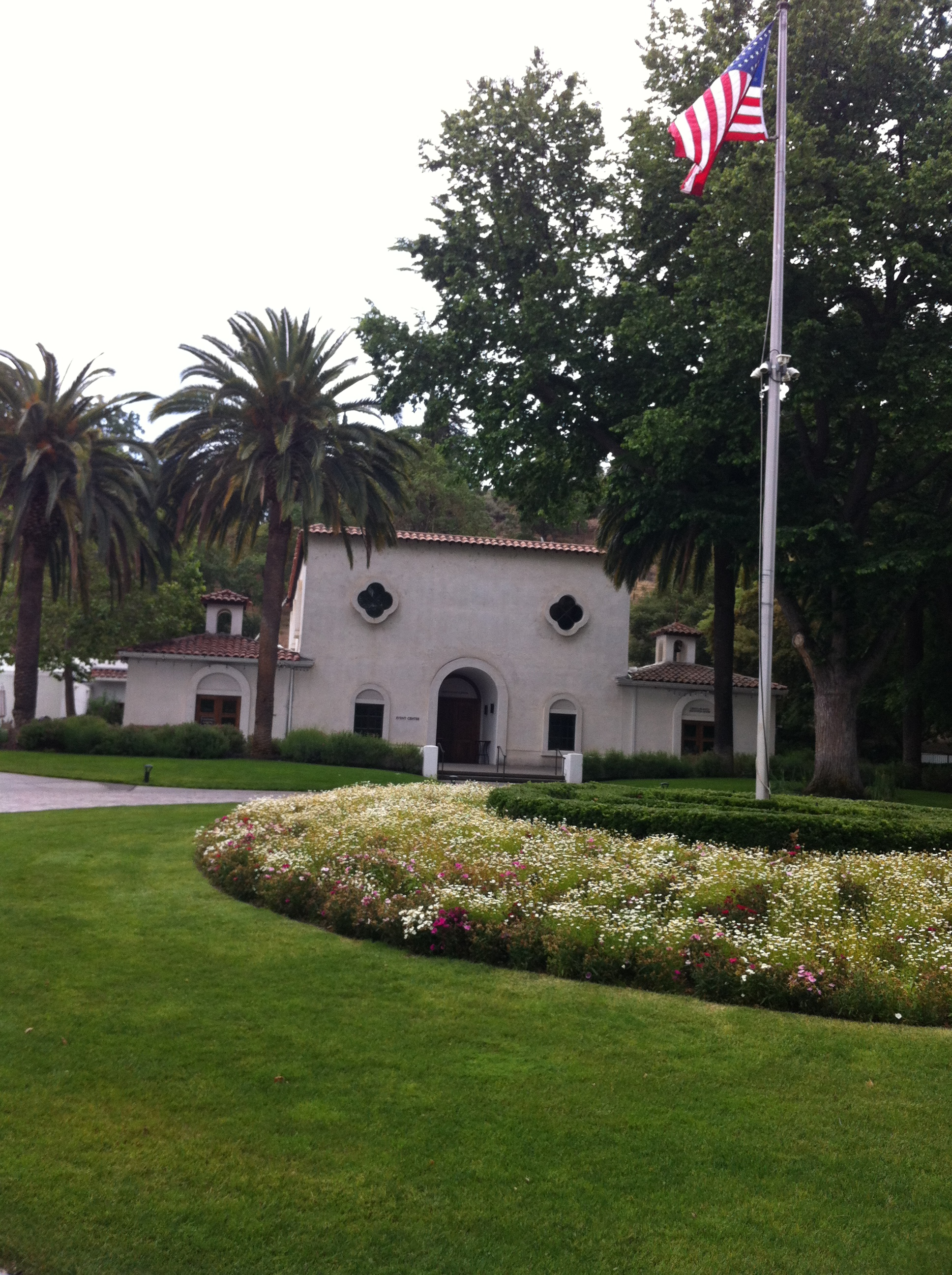
- One of the original buildings of the Cresta Blanca winery that is today owned by Wente Vineyards.

- Location within California
- 37.623317°N 121.756267°W
- Location: 5050 Arroyo Rd., Livermore, California

Site notes
- Governing body: Private

California Historical Landmark
- Designated: 1957
- Reference no.: 586

Cresta Blanca Winery was one of the original Livermore Valley wineries. It was founded by Charles Wetmore in 1882 with cuttings of Sauvignon blanc from Chateau d'Yquem and other top Bordeaux properties. Its first vintage, a dry white wine in 1884 won Grand Prize at the 1889 Paris Exposition, becoming the first California wine to win a competition in France. The victory also assured the future of the California wine industry, which had fallen upon hard times.

== History ==
Named for a white limestone cliff that dominates the Livermore Valley landscape, the winery was thriving prior to Prohibition, at which time it had to be shut down. Wetmore died before Prohibition's repeal, but it was re-opened by his brother Clarence. It was sold in 1941 to Schenley Industries who closed the business in 1965. The name was then sold to the Guild Wine Company in 1965. The land remained fallow until it was purchased by the Wente family in 1981, and revitalized as the "Sparkling Cellars."

The winery is registered as California Historical Landmark #586.

Cresta Blanca Winery was a sponsor for the radio show The Cresta Blanca Hollywood Players on CBS September 3, 1946 – February 26, 1947, and for the television show "Amos and Andy" in the early 1950s, featuring a black and white commercial (color television was in its infancy at the time) that references "historic Cresta Blanca Winery" location "from the cool white limestone caves" in Livermore, California.

== Vineyards ==
The vineyards were located on the South end of Arroyo Road in Livermore, California.
