= Santa Clara Valley AVA =

Appellation that designates wine in San Francisco Bay Area, California

Coordinates: 37°07′00″N 121°41′11″W

Santa Clara Valley
- Wine region
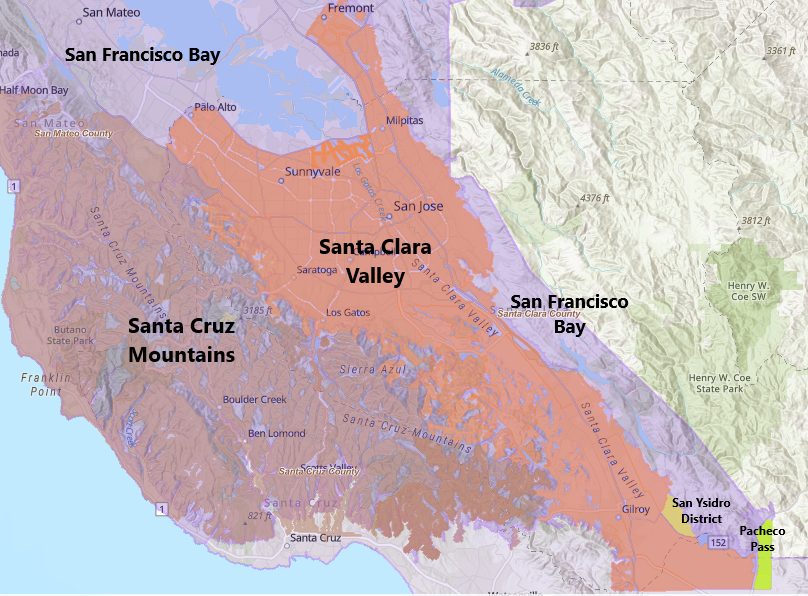
- Type: American Viticultural Area
- Year established: 1989
- Years of wine industry: 249
- Country: United States
- Part of: California, Central Coast AVA, San Francisco Bay AVA
- Other regions in California, Central Coast AVA, San Francisco Bay AVA: Livermore Valley AVA, Lamorinda AVA, Contra Costa AVA
- Sub-regions: Pacheco Pass AVA, San Ysidro District AVA
- Precipitation (annual average): 16 to 20 in (406–508 mm)
- Soil conditions: Yolo and Zamora-Arbuckle-Pleasanton Associations
- Total area: 352,000 acres (550 sq mi)
- Size of planted vineyards: around 1,500 acres (607 ha)
- Grapes produced: Cabernet Sauvignon, Carignane, Chardonnay, Fiano, Grenache, Grignolino, Merlot, Muscat Canelli, Petite Sirah, Pinot noir, Riesling, Roussanne, Sangiovese, Semillon, Syrah, Zinfandel
- No. of wineries: 40+

Santa Clara Valley is an American Viticultural Area (AVA) located within the Santa Clara Valley landform across Santa Clara, San Benito, San Mateo and Alameda counties in California. It was established as the nation's 105^{th}, the state's 60^{th} and the county’s fourth appellation on March 28, 1989, by the Bureau of Alcohol, Tobacco and Firearms (ATF), Treasury after evaluating the petition submitted by Mr. Eugene Guglielmo of Guglielmo Winery and Mr. Ernest Fortino of Fortino Winery, on behalf of valley wineries and vintners, proposing a viticultural area extending from southern San Francisco Bay including the cities of San Jose, Santa Clara, Menlo Park, Mountain View and Fremont toward the southern boundary encompassing Gilroy and Morgan Hill, defining the viticultural area known as "Santa Clara Valley."

The area served an important role in the early history of California wine and was home to the pioneer winemakers Paul Masson and Charles Lefranc. It includes the historic winegrowing areas of Santa Clara County not already within the Santa Cruz Mountains viticultural area, plus the area near Mission San José in Alameda County and a small part of San Benito County. Santa Clara Valley encompasses the established viticultural areas, Pacheco Pass and San Ysidro District. The USDA plant hardiness zone range is 9a to 10a.

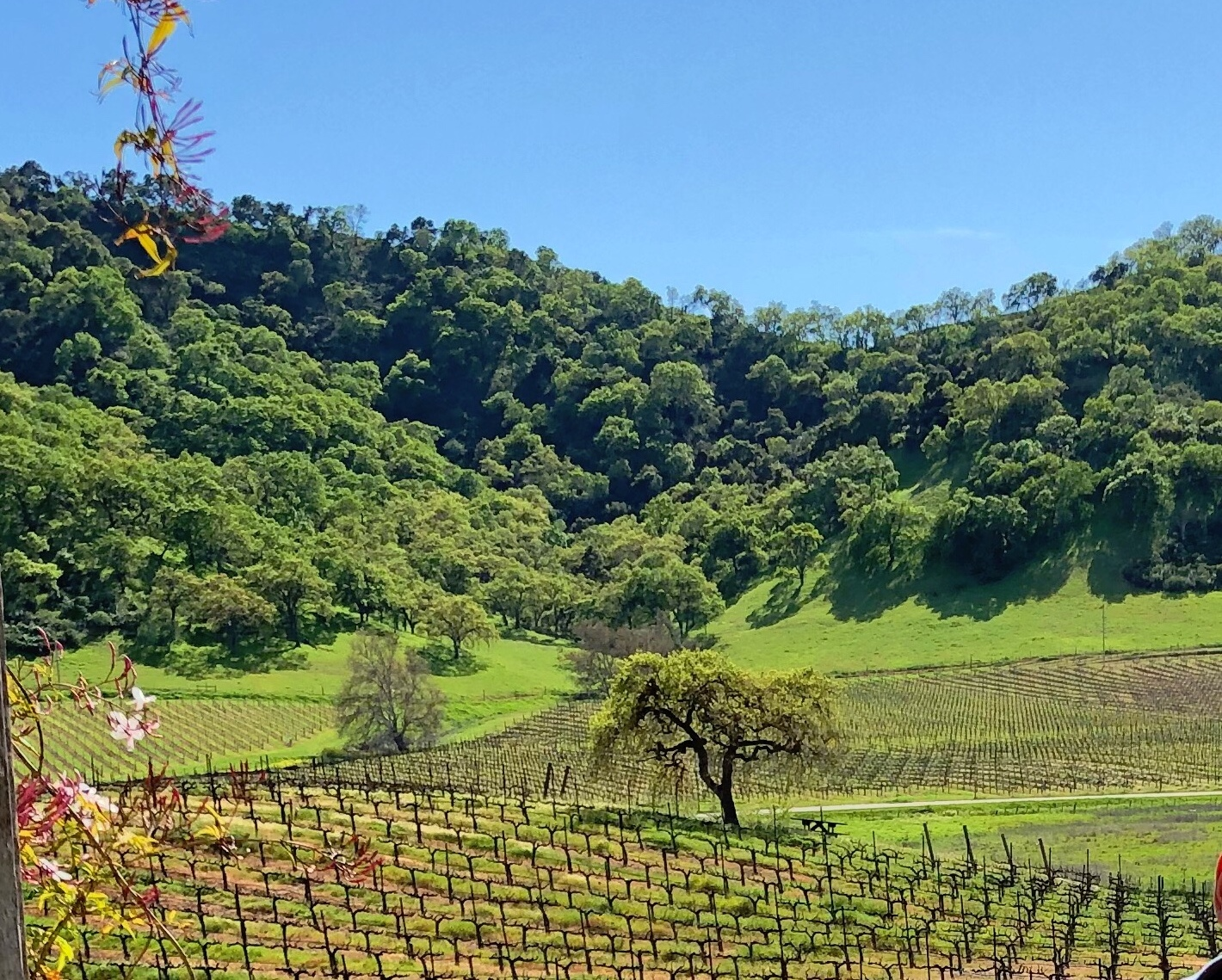
Vineyard in Morgan Hill, California

== History ==
Santa Clara Valley is the oldest wine region in Northern California dating back to 1777 when Franciscan padres founded Mission Santa Clara de Asis and planted vitis vinifera in its vineyard for sacramental wine. The term "Santa Clara Valley" has been used in local books written from 1871 to present. The area has a long history as a grape-growing area. As stated by Mr. Leon Adams in his book, Wines of America, "Santa Clara is the oldest of northern California wine districts." The tourist pamphlet San Jose-Santa Clara County, California (with full information on the Santa Clara Valley) published by the San Jose Chamber of Commerce (circa 1905) described the geographical features and local agriculture of the Santa Clara Valley. The best evidence of the area's identification as the Santa Clara Valley is indicated on the United States Geological Survey (U.S.G.S.) maps that depict and name the entire valley area from a topographic viewpoint. By the 1850s Santa Clara had more acres of vineyards than any other county in California. By 1883 the county had almost 15,000 acres (6,100 ha) of vines and over 100 wineries, but over-expansion and phylloxera took a heavy toll and by 1902 over 10,000 acres (4,000 ha) disappeared, mostly replanted to fruit trees such as prunes and apricots. By 1910 over half the wineries had disappeared.

Prohibition caused another boom in viticulture, with fruit being much in demand for home winemakers. By 1926 around 11,000 acres (4,500 ha) were planted, but since then there has been a gradual decline. By 1997 a little over 1,100 acres (450 ha) were planted; since then there has been a gradual resurgence. The population expanded because of the growth of high-tech businesses, and original Almaden Vineyards were uprooted to make way for urban sprawl. Today the majority of the remaining vineyards are found between the Diablo Mountains in Contra Costa and the Santa Cruz Mountains south of San Jose near Morgan Hill and Gilroy, with some in the foothills of the Santa Cruz Mountains near Saratoga. As of August 2014, a collaboration between the cities of Gilroy, Morgan Hill, and Santa Clara County, along with the industry association Wineries of Santa Clara Valley, formed the "Santa Clara Valley Wine Trail" to connect the many wineries and promote agritourism.
