= Black Hills Playhouse =

Theater in Custer, South Dakota

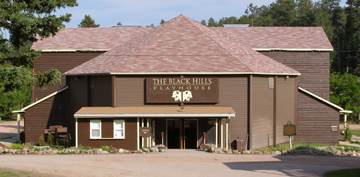
- Black Hills Playhouse

- Location within South Dakota Location within the United States
- Address: 24834 S. Playhouse Road
- Location: Custer, South Dakota, 57730
- Coordinates: 43.8066°N 103.42797°W
- Operator: Black Hills Playhouse Inc.

Construction
- Built: 1933
- Opened: 1946
- Builder: Civilian Conservation Corps

Website
- www.blackhillsplayhouse.com

The Black Hills Playhouse is an American theater located just off the Needles Highway and Iron Mountain Road in Custer State Park in the Black Hills of South Dakota. The playhouse is managed by Black Hills Playhouse Inc. It is one of the oldest continuously operated non-profit, non-equity professional summer stock theaters in America.

== History ==
Founded in 1946 by University of South Dakota drama professor Dr. Warren M. Lee, the Black Hills Playhouse and its dormitories for actors had been constructed by the Civilian Conservation Corps in 1933. The playhouse opened on June 17, 1946, with plays presented in the Coolidge Inn on the grounds of the Game Lodge.

The current theater was built in 1955. New dormitories for its theatrical company were built between 1979 and 1982. Leonard Anderson took over as the Managing Director in 1976. In 1987 Jan Swank became Managing Artistic Director. In 2007 a restructuring occurred and Bruce Halverson was hired as the Executive Director. In 2008 Michael Burgraff became the Executive Director, followed by Linda Anderson in 2010.

In 2011, a successful fundraising campaign raised over $500,000 to make improvements to the historic campus. The theater roof structure was strengthened and the building was brought up to 2011 building codes, including covered stairwells, new fire suppression system, a new sanded paver system and sidewalks outside of the building. In addition, a new dining hall was constructed and the snack bar structure foundation was strengthened. A covered log picnic area, Haberman Hall, was renovated as well.

In 2012, a program called Room Service was started where volunteers adopted dorm rooms and provided materials and labor for renovations. As of 2013, 48 of 50 rooms have been renovated with completion expected in 2014.

In 2013 a new costume shop was built with assistance from the South Dakota National Guard, Boxelder Job Corps and many other partners. A new fly system was installed in the theater and new stage draperies purchased and installed as a result of fundraising by the Black Hills Playhouse Alumni Association.

The Black Hills Playhouse is affiliated with the University of South Dakota College of Fine Arts. Each summer the company produces 4-5 shows with performances occurring June through the middle of August. Auditions are held in six locations in February. Professional designers, directors and technical staff are hired annually.

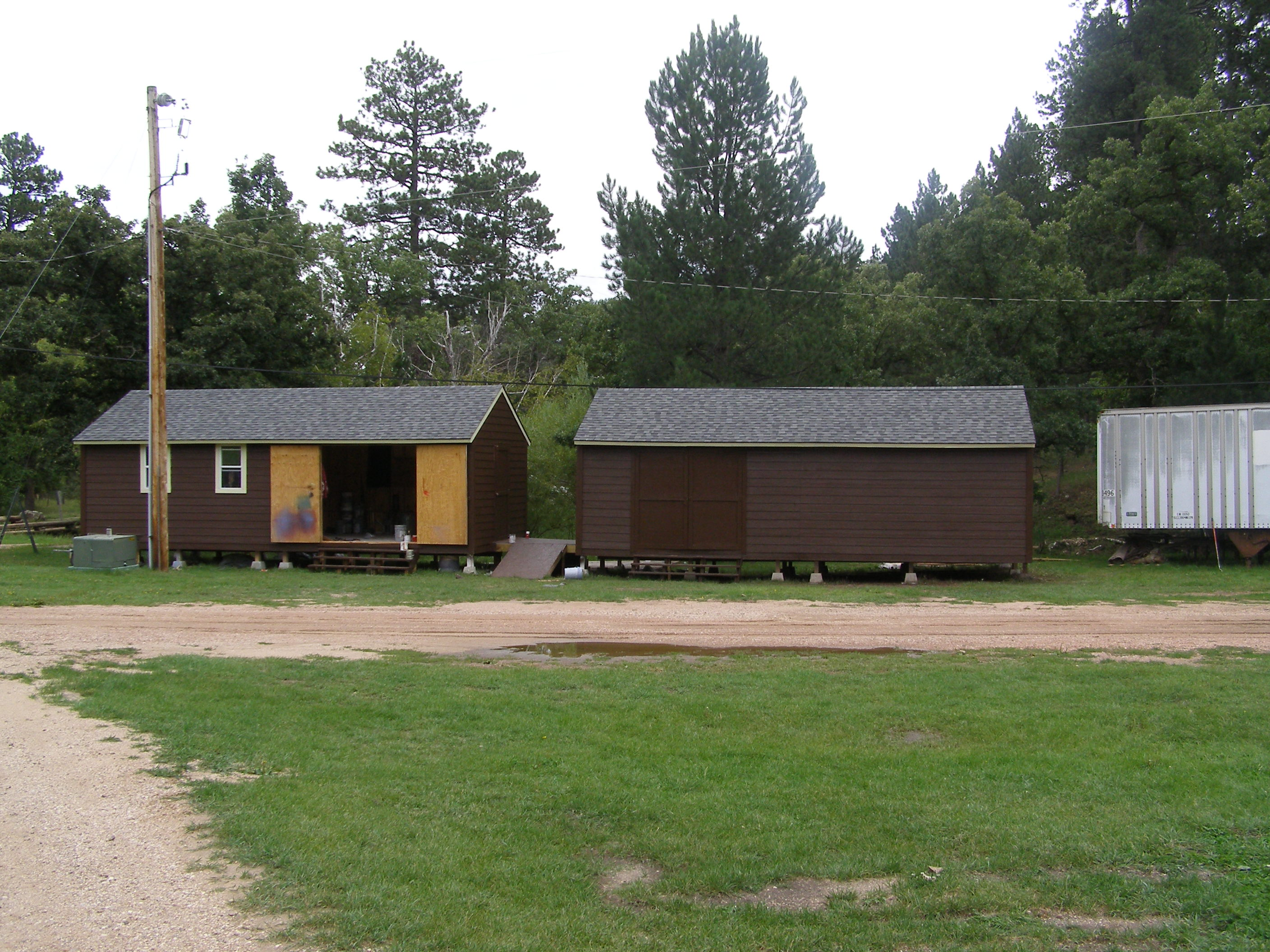
The old paint/scene shops built in 2007 have been converted into the prop and costume shops. This happened in 2008 after the Barber Shop (current scene shop) was built.

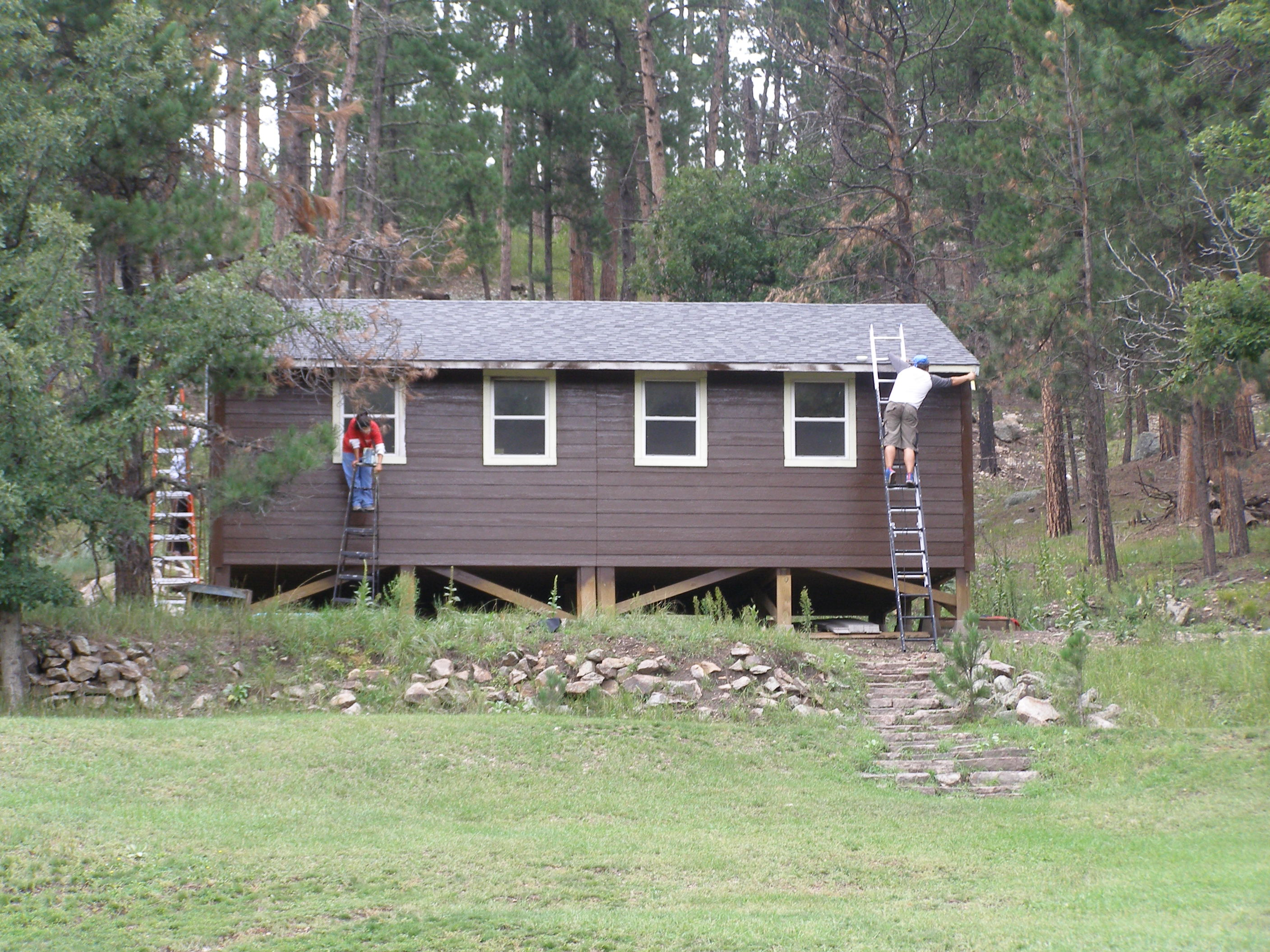
A new rehearsal hall was built in 2007 on the site of the old bath house.

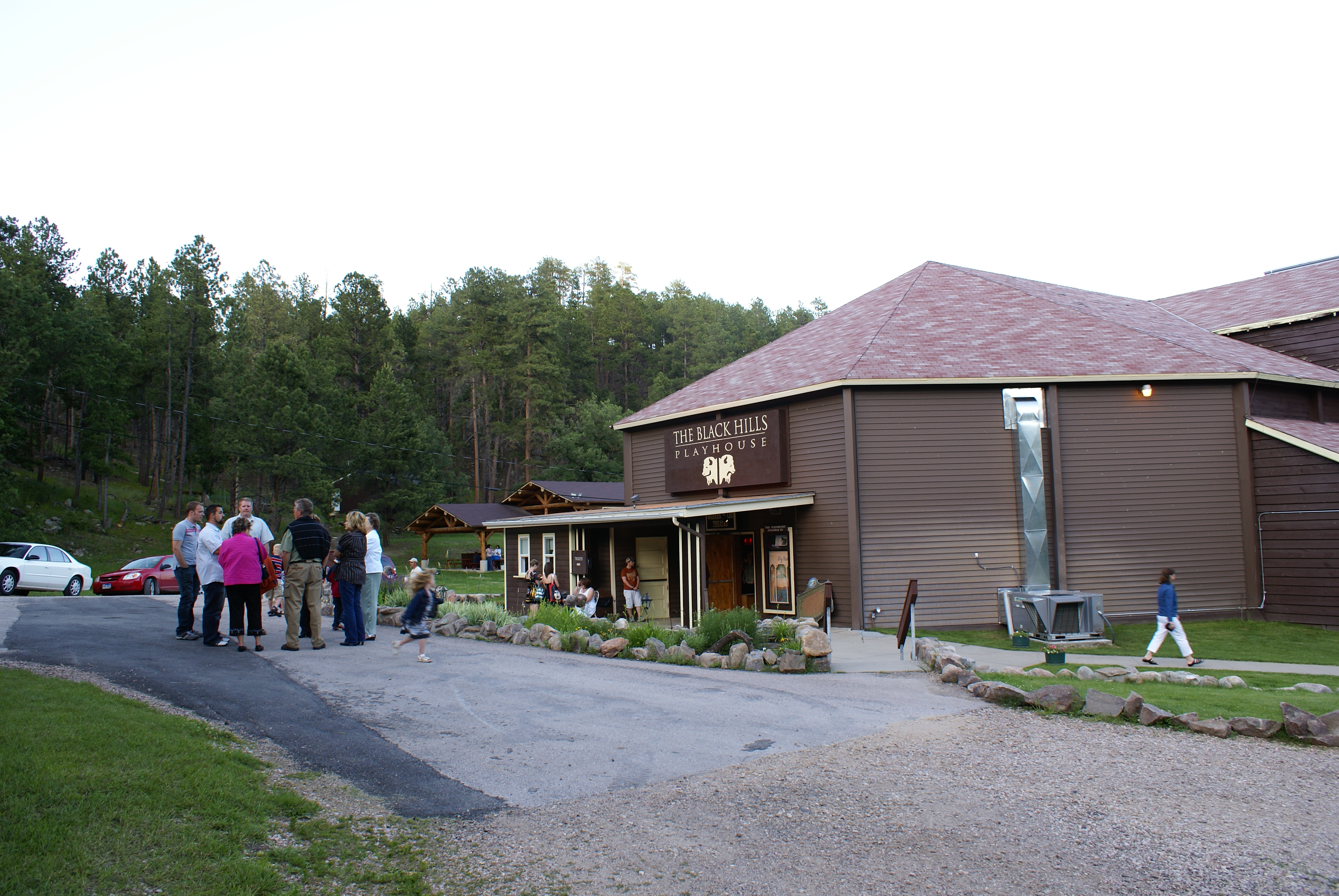
The new Air Conditioning Units were added in the summer of 2008.

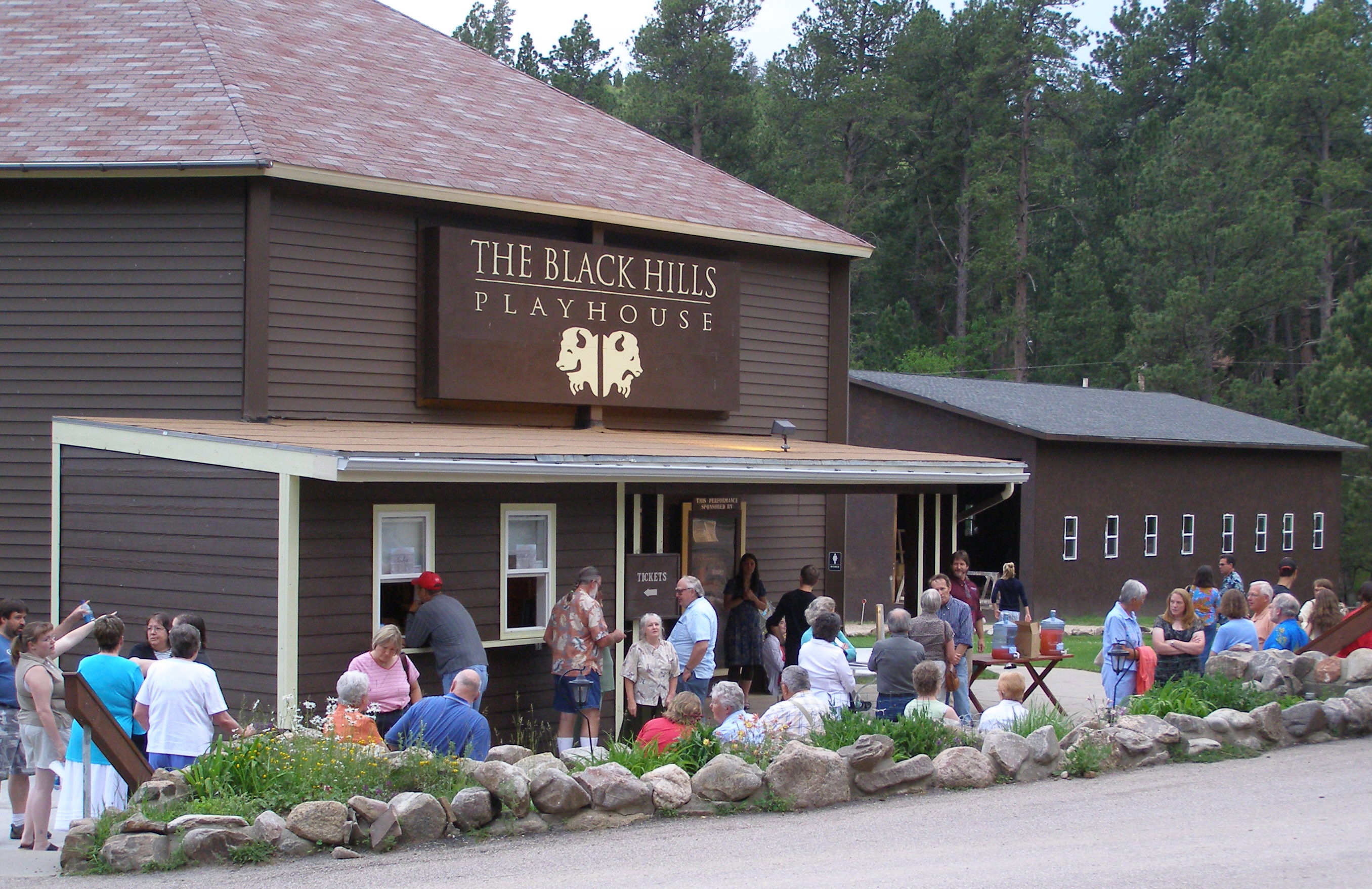
The scene/paint shop built in 2008, known as the Barber Shop after Bill Barber.

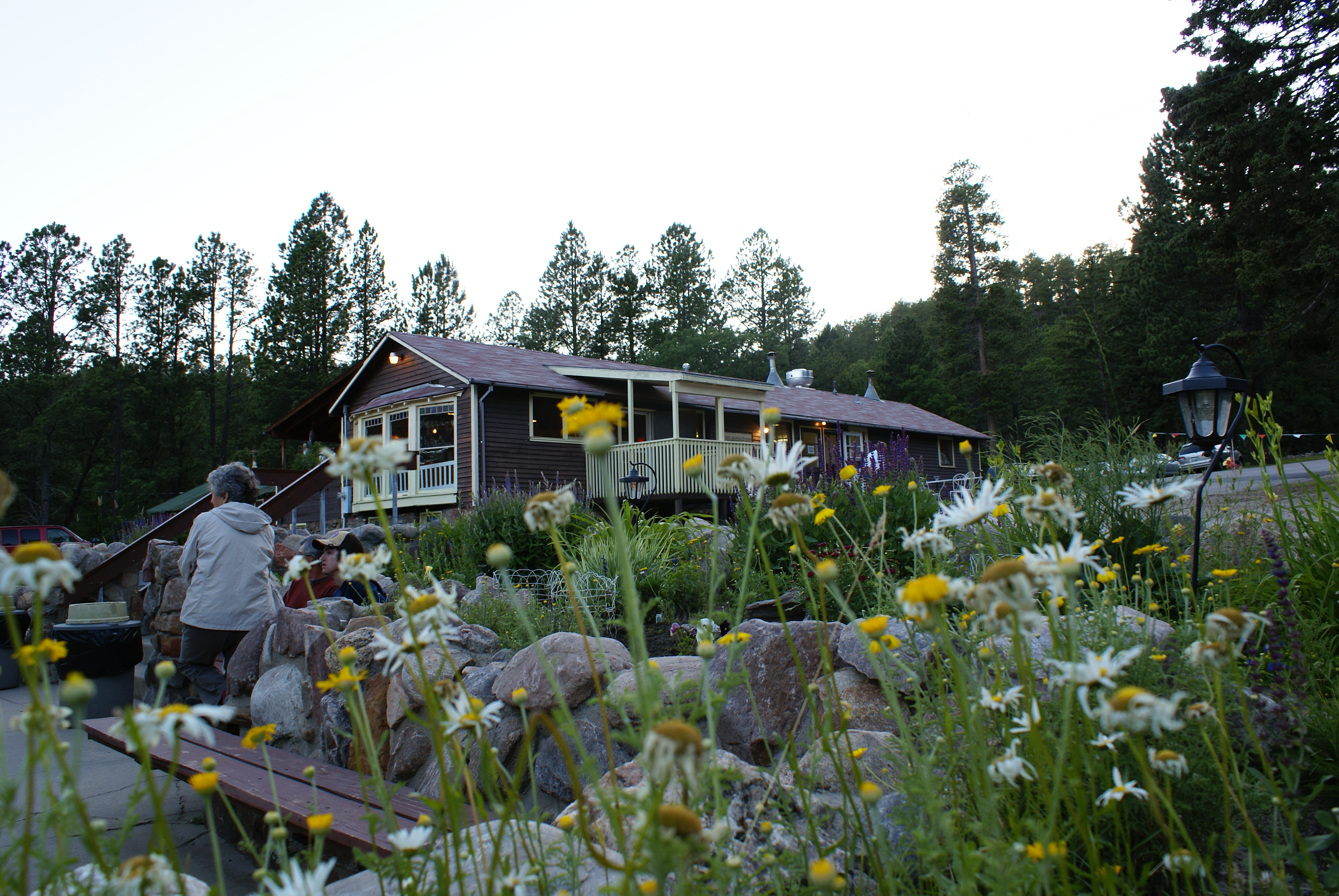
The snack bar foundation was strengthened in 2011.
