= San Francisco Bay AVA =

Appellation that designates wine in San Francisco Bay Area, California, U.S.

Coordinates: 37°29′26″N 122°18′55″W

San Francisco Bay
- Wine region
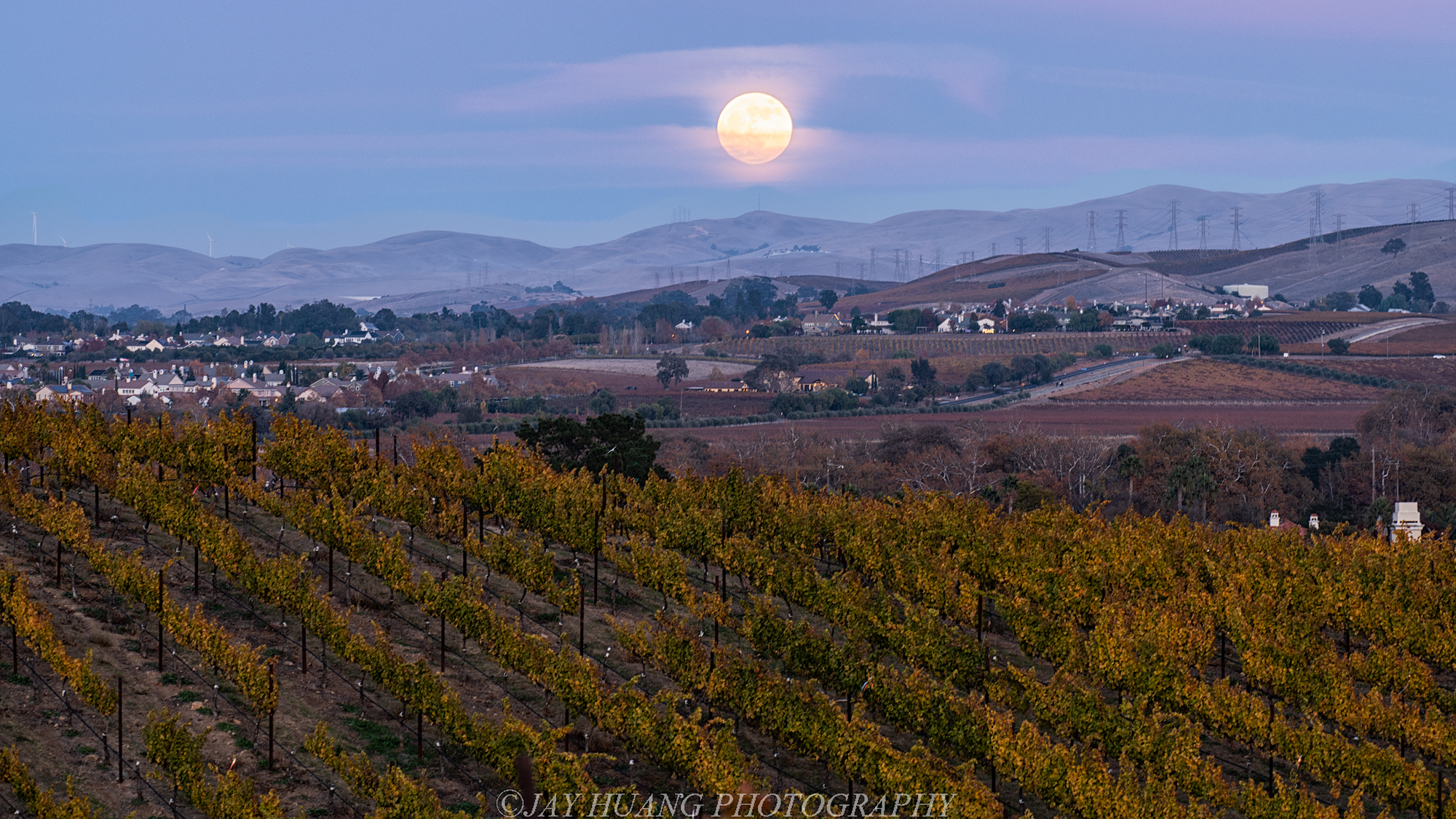
- Full moon over Livermore Valley vineyard
- Type: American Viticultural Area
- Year established: 1999; 2006 Amended; 2008 Amended; 2024 Amended
- Years of wine industry: 170
- Country: United States
- Part of: California, Central Coast AVA
- Sub-regions: Livermore Valley AVA, Santa Clara Valley AVA, Lamorinda AVA, Contra Costa AVA, Santa Cruz Mountains AVA, Ben Lomond Mountain AVA
- Climate region: Region I-V
- Heat units: 2,140-4,275 GDD units
- Precipitation (annual average): 18 to 40 in (457–1,016 mm)
- Total area: 1.7 million acres (2,651.05 sq mi)
- Size of planted vineyards: 7,500 acres (3,035 ha)
- Grapes produced: Cabernet Sauvignon, Cabernet Franc, Chardonnay, Grenache, Mourvedre, Petite Sirah, Pinot Noir, Riesling, Sangiovese, Syrah, Zinfandel
- No. of wineries: 137

San Francisco Bay is a multi-county American Viticultural Area (AVA) which is centered and surrounds the San Francisco Bay Area of Northern California. It was established as the nation's 135^{th} and the state's 81^{st} appellation on January 19, 1999 by the Bureau of Alcohol, Tobacco and Firearms (ATF), Treasury after evaluating the petition submitted by a consortium of nearly 75 growers and vintners led by Wente Brothers proposing the viticultural area known as "San Francisco Bay."

It lies within the larger Central Coast viticultural area and includes San Francisco and counties encompassing the areas known as "South" and "East Bay." This consists of Alameda, Contra Costa, Santa Clara, and San Mateo as well as portions of Santa Cruz and San Benito Counties. "North Bay" counties of Sonoma, Napa and Marin were excluded for they reside within the North Coast viticultural area with its distinct properties. ATF also concluded the established Santa Cruz Mountains viticultural area exhibits features and characteristics unique to its boundaries when compared to the surrounding areas, therefore, it was excluded from the "San Francisco Bay" viticultural area.

"San Francisco Bay" AVA expands 1.7 million acres (2,651.05 sq mi) and encompasses six designated AVAs within its boundaries: Livermore Valley, Santa Clara Valley, Lamorinda, Santa Cruz Mountains, Ben Lomond Mountain and most recent Contra Costa. In conjunction with establishing "San Francisco Bay" viticultural area, ATF amended the boundaries of the Central Coast viticultural area to include San Francisco Bay entirely as the previous boundaries of Central Coast encompassed only smaller portions of the San Francisco Bay region. Approximately 440,960 acres (689 sq mi) was added to Central Coast with an additional 2,827 acres (1,144 ha) under vine. In 2006, the Alcohol and Tobacco Tax and Trade Bureau {TTB} added 20,000 acres (31 sq mi) to San Francisco Bay viticultural area and the Central Coast viticultural area to conform to the expanded boundaries of the Livermore Valley viticultural area.

== History ==
The city of San Francisco became an important port during the 1850s, when the California gold rush in the Sierra Nevada mountains brought a huge influx of European and Chinese immigrants, in search of fortune. It was around this time that European grape varieties began to be planted throughout the Santa Clara Valley, Contra Costa County and other California regions to supply the demand of the thirsty population. The city was filled with winemakers, brokers and wine warehouses; the 1893 city directory included more than 120 entries under "native wines." Gundlach-Bundschu's block-long winery was destroyed in the 1906 San Francisco earthquake. Geyser Peak had a Montgomery St. facility and legendary vintner Louis Petri got his start moving barrels in his family's San Francisco warehouse. But by the 1970s, Napa and Sonoma wineries were coming of age and the wine lifestyle had shifted away from "The City."

The watershed event in the viticulture industry occurred in 1976 during the United States Bicentennial celebration. British wine connoisseur, merchant and founder of France's first private wine school, L'Academie du Vin, Steven Spurrier, organized the Paris Wine Tasting of 1976 where renown French oenophiles participated in a blind tasting to judge the best wines from California's wine regions and France's prestigious Bordeaux and Burgundy regions. George Taber, the sole journalist who attended the event, penned the article "Judgment of Paris" in Time magazine reporting the shocking results when the local judges ranked the California vintages, from Napa and Monterey, higher than the primer French labels in both Chardonnay (white) and Cabernet Sauvignon (red) categories.

== Naming ==
"San Francisco Bay" is a locally, nationally and internationally recognized place name. ATF concluded that "San Francisco Bay" is the appropriate name for the area. San Francisco Bay is widely recognized as the well-known body of water by that name and, by inference, the land areas that surround it. Within the grape growing and winemaking community, the name San Francisco Bay has always been identified with the "San Francisco Bay" viticultural area.

The counties of San Francisco, Contra Costa, Alameda, Santa Clara and San Mateo—within which the area is located—border the San Francisco Bay. Santa Cruz County, although it has no Bay shoreline, has traditionally been associated with the place name "San Francisco Bay." Also included is the portion of the Santa Clara Valley located in San Benito County. The names "San Francisco Bay Area" or "San Francisco Bay region" sometimes refer to an area that is different than the area discussed in the petition. Although sources differ in how broadly they define the San Francisco Bay region, the various definitions, without exception, include the counties mentioned above. The following sources were cited by the petitioner as being representative of the consensus among experts that the petitioned area is widely known by the name San Francisco Bay. The name "San Francisco Bay" is more frequently and more strongly associated with the counties lying south and east of the San Francisco Bay than with nearby counties to the north. For example, the 1967 Time-Life book entitled "The Pacific States", describes the San Francisco Bay Area as a megalopolis with the city, of San Francisco, as the center, stretching 40 miles (64 km) south to San Jose and from the Pacific to Oakland and beyond. The weather expert Harold Gilliam, in his book "Weather of the San Francisco Bay Region", discusses an area including San Francisco, San Mateo, Alameda, Contra Costa, and Santa Cruz Counties. James E. Vance Jr., Professor of Geography at the University of California, Berkeley, studied the same area in his book entitled "Geography and Urban Evolution in the San Francisco Bay Area". Also, climatologist Clyde Patton studied the same region in his definitive work "Climatology of Summer Fogs in the San Francisco Bay Area". Mr. Vance's and Mr. Patton's maps of "Bay Area Place Names" were included with the petition. A final source is Lawrence Kinnaird, University of California Professor of History, who wrote a "History of the Greater San Francisco Bay Region". Mr. Kinnaird's book also covers the counties of San Francisco, Santa Clara, Alameda, Contra Costa, San Mateo, and Santa Cruz.

== Terroir ==
=== Topography ===
San Francisco Bay AVA is distinguished by a marine climate which is heavily influenced by the proximity of the San Francisco Bay and the Pacific Ocean. Specifically, the San Francisco Bay and local geographical features surrounding it permit the cooling influence of the Pacific Ocean to reach farther into the interior of California in the Bay Area vicinity than elsewhere along the California coast. The waters of the San Francisco Bay as well as urban areas, particularly the City of San Francisco, were purposely included since San Francisco Bay is the source of the viticultural area's weather and the focal point of its history. Although it is not a likely vineyard site, the city has long been a wine industry hub.

The weather in the Bay region is a product of the modification of the onshore marine air masses by the topography of the Coast Ranges, a double chain of mountains running north-northwest to south-southeast. Each chain divides into two or more smaller chains, creating a patchwork of valleys. The elevation of the western chain of the coastal ridge is generally higher than the altitude of the inversion base, the inversion acts as a lid to prevent the cool onshore flowing marine air and fog from rising over the mountains and flowing inland. Because of this, successive inland valleys generally have less of a damp, seacoast climate and more of a dry, continental climate. This pattern is modified by a few gaps and passes in the mountain ranges that allow marine influences to spread farther inland without obstruction. These inland areas are, however, somewhat protected from the Pacific fogs, which are evaporated as the flow is warmed by passage over the warmer land surfaces.

The three largest sea level gaps in the central California coastal mountainous barrier are (north to south): Estero Lowland in Sonoma, Golden Gate into San Francisco Bay, and Monterey Bay. Several smaller mountain pass gaps (San Bruno and Crystal Springs) sometimes also allow for the inland spread of coastal climate in the Bay Area when the elevated inversion base is high enough.

The Bay Area climate is greatly modified by San Francisco Bay, whose influence is similar to that of the ocean, i.e., it cools summer high temperatures and warms winter low temperatures. The narrowness of the Golden Gate limits the exchange of bay and ocean waters, and thus Bay waters are not quite as cold as the coastal ocean currents during the summer. Marine air exits the San Francisco Bay (without having experienced the normal drying and heating effects associated with over-land travel) in several directions. The predominant outflow is carried by the onshore northwesterly winds toward the south through the Santa Clara Valley to Morgan Hill and to the east via the Hayward Pass and Niles Canyon. Temperatures at given locations in the Bay Area are thus dependent on streamline distance (actual distance traveled) from the ocean, rather than its "as the crow flies" distance from the ocean.

Livermore Valley temperatures show this phenomenon. Ocean air flows across San Francisco Bay, through the Hayward Pass and Niles Canyon, and into the Livermore Valley, causing a cooling effect in summer and a warming effect in winter. In summary, because of the interaction of topography with the prevailing winds in the Bay Area, the Pacific Ocean and San Francisco Bay are the major climatic influences in the "San Francisco Bay" viticultural area. This interaction has two principal effects: (1) to allow the coastal influence of the Pacific Ocean to extend farther east than otherwise possible, and (2) to modify that coastal influence because of the moderating effects of Bay waters on surrounding weather.

=== Climate ===
==== Coastal influence ====
The unifying and distinguishing feature of the "San Francisco Bay" viticultural area is the coastal influence of both the Pacific Ocean and the San Francisco Bay. Coastal areas north of the appellation area are influenced by the Pacific Ocean and by weather in the area is the Pacific high pressure system, centered a thousand miles off the Pacific Coast. During winter months, its location south of San Francisco allows the passage of westward moving, rain producing, low pressure storms through the area. During the summer months the high is located closer to the latitude of San Francisco. It then deflects rain, producing storms to the north and a dry summer climate in the San Francisco area.

The winds from the high (which flow onshore from the northwest to the southeast) produce a cold southward flowing surface water current, called the "California Current", off the California coast by a process called "upwelling", in which cold deep water is brought to the surface. When moist marine air from the Pacific High flows onshore over this cold water, it cools, producing fog and/or stratus cloud areas which are transported inland by wind.

==== Meteorology ====
From a meteorological perspective, the northwesterly windflow through the Estero Gap (near Petaluma in Sonoma County) into the Petaluma Valley, provides the major source of marine influence for areas north of the Golden Gate. Airflow inland from San Pablo Bay also affects the climate of southern Napa and Sonoma Counties. San Francisco Bay has little impact on the weather in the region to its north. The onshore prevailing northwesterly flow direction, in combination with the coastal range topographic features of counties north of the Bay and the pressure differential of the Central Valley, minimize a northward influence from the air that enters the Golden Gate. The higher humidity, lower temperatures, and wind flow that enter the Golden Gate gap do not flow north of the San Francisco Bay.

As a result of the different air mass sources, grape-growing sites immediately north of the Bay are cooler than corresponding sites in the Bay Area. As an example, General Viticulture lists Napa with 2880 degree-days, while directly south of Napa on the Carquinez Strait) has 3500 degree-days. Martinez (directly south of Napa on the Carquinez Strait) has 3500 degree-days. Calistoga is listed as 3150 degree-days, while Livermore (approximately equidistant from the Carquinez Strait, but to the south) has 3400. The degree-day concept was developed by UC Davis Professors Amerine and Winkler as a measure of climate support for vine growth and grape ripening; large degree-day values indicate warmer climates.

The "San Francisco Bay" viticultural area is also distinguished from the counties north of the San Francisco Bay by annual rainfall amounts. Most winter storms that hit the Central California coast originate in the Gulf of Alaska. Thus, locations in the North Coast viticultural area generally receive more rain than sites in the "San Francisco Bay" viticultural area. This effect is illustrated by Hamilton Air Force Base on the northwest shore of the San Pablo Bay in Marin County. The base gets 25 percent more rain in a season than does San Mateo, which has a corresponding bay shore location 34 miles (55 km) to the south. San Francisco gets an average of 21 inches (533 mm) of rain annually, but nine miles north of the Golden Gate, Kentfield gets 46 inches (1,168 mm)—more than double the amount of rain. Average rainfall over the entire South Bay wine producing area is only 18 inches (457 mm), while the City of Napa averages 25 inches (635 mm), Sonoma County (average of 5 sites) averages 35 inches (889 mm), and Mendocino County averages 40 inches (1,016 mm).

===== Rainfall =====
Following are thirty year average rainfall statistics for locations in the Central Valley: Modesto 10.75 inches (273.05 mm), Fresno 10.32 in (262.13 mm), Los Banos 7.98 in (203 mm), Lodi 12.74 inches (324 mm), Antioch 12.97 inches (329 mm). Thus, the main determinants of the eastern boundary of the viticultural area include the (1) historic existing eastern boundary of the Central Coast viticultural area, (2) natural geographic/topographic climatic barrier created by the Diablo Range, and (3) the inland boundary of the coastal marine influence.

These factors lead to significant temperature, humidity and precipitation differences between the areas east and west of the eastern boundary. The southern boundary matches those of the Santa Cruz and Santa Clara viticultural areas where the San Francisco Bay influence is diminished and the Monterey Bay influence is felt south of the "San Francisco Bay" viticultural area.

===== Wind flow and temperature =====
The regional northwestern prevailing wind flow direction generally prevents the Monterey Bay influence from affecting the climate in the viticultural area. Monterey Bay has a very broad mouth with high mountain ranges to both the north and south. Fog and ocean air traveling along the Pajaro River do on rare occasions reach the south end of the Santa Clara Valley to the north, but most of the Monterey Bay influence travels to the east and south (borne by the prevailing northwest wind) into the Salinas Valley and up against the eastern coastal hills. Coast climate thus gradually warms with increased distance from the San Francisco Bay, as air traveling over land areas south of the bay accumulates heat and dries out.

The warming trend reverses, however, at the point where the south end of the Santa Clara Valley meets the Pajaro River. Here wind and fog from the Monterey Bay, flowing westward through the Pajaro River gap, begins to assert a cooling influence. The decrease of San Francisco Bay influence, and the concurrent increase of Monterey Bay influence, is demonstrated by the difference in heat summation between Gilroy and Hollister. Central Coast sites warm with increasing distance from the San Francisco Bay, but this pattern reverses at the southern boundary of the Santa Clara Valley viticultural area, between Gilroy and Hollister, as the influence of the Monterey Bay becomes dominant.

This produces significantly cooler temperatures in Hollister than in Gilroy, even though Hollister is farther from San Francisco Bay. Hollister is significantly cooler than Gilroy even though its location is sheltered by hills from the full influence of Monterey Bay. In summary, the southern boundary of the "San Francisco Bay" viticultural area has been defined to match the southern boundary of the Santa Clara Valley and Santa Cruz viticultural areas because this is the location of the transition from a climate dominated by flow from the San Francisco Bay to one dominated by flow from Monterey Bay.

The western boundary of the "San Francisco Bay" viticultural area follows the Pacific coastline from San Francisco south to just north of the City of Santa Cruz. This area is greatly influenced by Pacific Ocean breezes and fog. The western hills of the Santa Cruz Mountains are exposed to the strong prevailing northwest winds. The climate of the eastern portion of these hills is affected by the moderating influences of the San Francisco Bay. North of Santa Cruz, the western boundary turns east excluding a small portion of Santa Cruz County, as it is within the Santa Cruz Mountains viticultural area which is excluded from the "San Francisco Bay" viticultural area as discussed above.

The area around Santa Cruz and Watsonville is close to sea level, and is sheltered from the prevailing northwesterly Pacific Ocean winds by the Santa Cruz mountains. Therefore, fog and bay breezes from Monterey Bay impact the area, while the San Francisco Bay does not. Therefore, the main determinant of the western boundary of "San Francisco Bay" viticultural area includes the (1) natural geography of the coastline, (2) Pacific Ocean and San Francisco Bay influence, and (3) historical identity as part of the San Francisco Bay Area. The USDA plant hardiness zones are 9a to 10b.

=== Subregions ===
==== North Coast ====
The California North Coast Grape Growers advanced a position that is consistent with the petitioner's current position. In a letter to the Bureau of Alcohol, Tobacco and Firearms dated September 14, 1979, they asked that the term North Coast Counties be applied only to Napa, Sonoma and Mendocino Counties. Part of their reasoning was the observations of Professor Crowley of the Geography Department at Sonoma State University who said that the counties north of the San Francisco Bay have different climates from the counties south of the Bay. Thus, the main determinants of the northern boundary of the viticultural area include the:

- Natural geographic/topographic barriers,
- Lack of direct San Francisco Bay influence in areas to its north, and
- Different predominant coastal influences in the northern area.

These factors lead to significant wind flow, temperature, and precipitation differences between the areas north and south of San Francisco Bay. Thus, it is logical to draw the northern boundary of the proposed area at the point where the Golden Gate Bridge and San Francisco Bay separate the northern counties, i.e., Marin, Napa, Solano, and Sonoma of the North Coast viticultural area from the counties of San Francisco and Contra Costa. The eastern boundary of the "San Francisco Bay" viticultural area matches the existing boundary of the Central Coast viticultural area and is located at the inland boundary of significant coastal influence, i.e., along the hills and mountains of the Diablo Range that form a topographical barrier to the intrusion of marine air.

==== Central Valley ====
East of the Diablo Range lies the Central Valley, distinguished from the "San Francisco Bay" viticultural area by its higher temperature, lower humidity, and decreased rainfall. The Central Valley has a completely continental climate, i.e., much hotter in summer and cooler in winter.

Amerine & Winkler categorize the grape growing areas in the Central Valley (Modesto, Oakdale, Stockton, Fresno) as Region V (over 4000 degree-days), while sites in the "San Francisco Bay" viticultural area range from Region I to III.
North of Altamont, the viticultural area boundary continues to follow the inland boundary of coastal influence. Like the existing eastern boundary of the Central Coast, this extension excludes the innermost range of coastal mountains. The eastern boundary includes Martinez and Concord, but excludes Antioch, and the eastern portion of Contra Costa County. The average precipitation in the Central Valley is lower than in the "San Francisco Bay" viticultural area.

== Viticutural Identity ==
Within the grape growing and winemaking community, the name "San Francisco Bay" has always been identified with the San Francisco Bay viticultural area. Several references reflect the industry's perception of this place name.
For example, wine writer Hugh Johnson, in his book "The World Atlas of Wine", devotes a separate section ("South of the Bay") to the wine-growing areas of the San Francisco Bay and Central Coast. Mr. Johnson describes the traditional centers of wine-growing in this area as concentrated in the Livermore Valley, east of the Bay; the western foothills of the Diablo Range; the towns south of the Bay; and along the slopes of the Santa Cruz Mountains down to a cluster of family wineries around the Hecker Pass. Mr. Johnson repeatedly distinguishes the wine-growing region south and east of the Bay from areas to the north of the Bay. A statement in Mr. Johnson's book points out that the area just south and east of San Francisco Bay is wine country as old as the Napa Valley.

Another writer, Robert Lawrence Balzer, devotes a chapter to "Vineyards and Wineries: Bay Area and Central Coast Counties" in his book "Wines of California". This chapter and the accompanying map include wineries and vineyards in Alameda, Contra Costa, San Mateo, Santa Clara, and Santa Cruz Counties. Throughout his book, Mr. Balzer makes it clear that he differentiates the San Francisco Bay area grape growing areas from those north of San Francisco Bay and south of Monterey Bay.

In support of this claim are several quotes from the book. For example, Mr. Balzer states that, "Logic, as well as geography, dictates our division into these unofficial groups of counties: North Coast, Bay Area and Central Coast, South Central Coast, Central Valley, and Southern California. The vineyard domain south of San Francisco is as rich and colorful in its vintage history as the more celebrated regions north of the Bay Area." This author does not consider Napa and Sonoma Counties as part of the Bay Area. The following statement is evidence of this. "Alameda County does not have the scenic charm of Napa and Sonoma." The same book contains a photograph showing the Golden Gate Bridge and San Francisco Bay with the caption, "San Francisco Bay divides the North Coast from the other wine areas of California."

Another source in support of the "San Francisco Bay" viticultural area boundaries is "Grape Intelligence," a reporting service for California winegrape industry statistics that issues a yearly report for grape varieties in the San Francisco Bay Area. Reports for this region cover San Francisco, San Mateo, Santa Cruz, Alameda and Contra Costa Counties.

As historical evidence, the San Francisco Viticultural District, defined by the State Viticultural Commissioners at the end of the last century, comprised the counties of San Francisco, San Mateo, Alameda, Santa Clara, Santa Cruz, San Benito, and Monterey—but no areas north of the Bay. The California Department of Food and Agriculture currently considers the area as a single unit. The Grape Pricing Districts established by the State of California reflect the joined perception of the six San Francisco Bay counties, by grouping San Francisco, San Mateo, Santa Cruz, Santa Clara, Alameda, and Contra Costa together in District 6. A list of "Largest Bay Area Wineries" from a chart which appeared in the San Francisco Business Times of November 21, 1988, includes 21 wineries in Alameda, Contra Costa, San Francisco, and San Mateo Counties. No wineries from the North Coast counties of Sonoma, Napa, Marin, Mendocino, or Lake are included.
