= Black Hill (South Lanarkshire) =

Coordinates: 55.6708°N 3.8602°W

- Location within South Lanarkshire
- OS grid reference: NS 831 435
- Council area: South Lanarkshire
- Lieutenancy area: Lanarkshire
- Country: Scotland
- Sovereign state: United Kingdom
- Post town: LANARK
- Postcode district: ML11
- Police: Scotland
- Fire: Scottish
- Ambulance: Scottish

The Black Hill in South Lanarkshire is owned by the National Trust for Scotland. It overlooks the Clyde Valley, and is the location of a burial cairn from the Bronze Age and an Iron Age fortress.

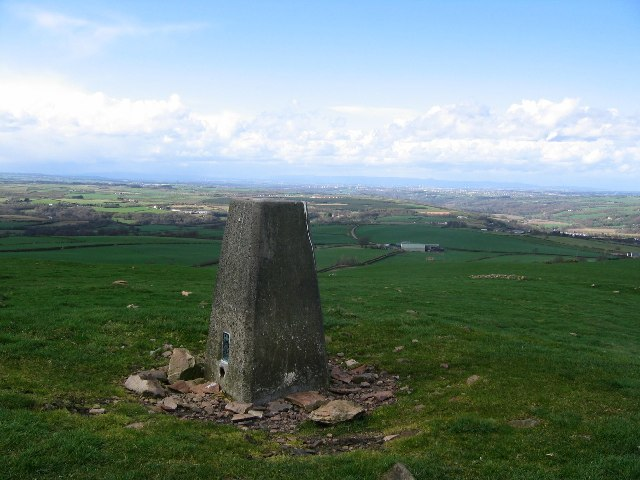
The view from the trig point on Black Hill, looking north towards Glasgow and the Campsie Fells

The hill is 2 miles (3 km) east of Blackwood and looks down to the Clyde valley at Kirkfieldbank. It peaks at a height of 290m (or 951 feet) - and now has an ordnance survey triangulation point on top of the cairn. Views include Goat Fell on the island of Arran and the Cobbler, Ben Lomond and parts of the Southern Highlands.

As a strategic viewpoint it has been valued for over 4,000 years. Today, the outline of the Iron Age fort and its settlement enclosure along with the Bronze Age burial cairn are clearly visible. The site may have had spiritual significance for these early peoples, indeed it has been suggested that the cairn was built in line with the larger summit cairn on Tinto, and may have been used as a means of deciding the date of the Winter solstice.

It was designated a scheduled monument in 1969.
