= Black Hill Down =

Protected area in Dorset, England

Coordinates: 50.80310°N 2.47250°W

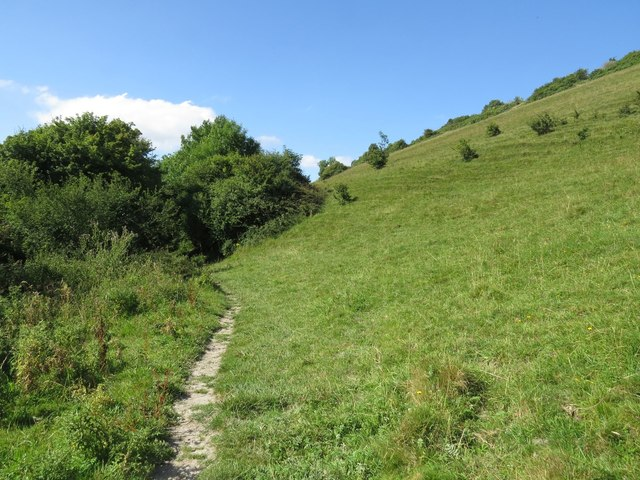
Footpath at foot of Black Hill

Black Hill Down (grid reference ST668005) is a 71.84 hectare biological Site of Special Scientific Interest in Dorset, notified in 1989.

== Sources ==
- English Nature citation sheet for the site (accessed 8 September 2006)
