= Blackhill and Consett Park =

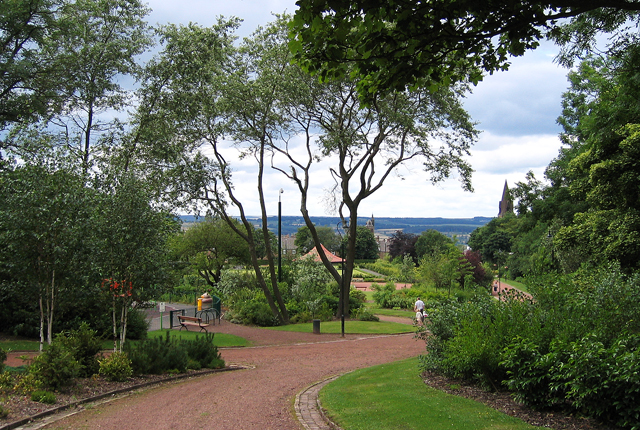
- Interactive map of Blackhill and Consett Park
- Type: Park
- Location: Consett, County Durham, England
- Coordinates: 54°51′27″N 1°50′20″W
- Operator: Durham County Council
- Open: All year

Blackhill and Consett Park is a park in Consett, County Durham, England. The park along with Benfieldside Cemetery and a number of buildings comprise the Blackhill conservation area.

== History ==
The park was founded by the Consett Iron Company. The ground on which the park was built was gifted by the Consett Iron Company to their staff, the gesture being typical of employers in the nineteenth century, which also saw other parks across the country constructed. The park was designed by Messer’s Robson and Company of Hexham and contained a fountain, a bandstand, tennis courts and a pavilion. It was officially opened on 11 July 1891.

== Blackhill conservation area ==
The park along with Benfieldside Cemetery and a number of residences and buildings comprise the Blackhill conservation area. The park and cemetery make up the bulk of the land area with the buildings being homogenous to the era. The conservation area illustrates the industrialisation and urbanisation of the area that happened in the late 19th and early 20th centuries as a result of the ironworks and reflects the tastes of this narrow time frame. The conservation area was designated in 1994.

== Facilities ==
The park contains an educational facility, two bowling greens, a bandstand, an outdoor theatre, car parking and toilets.
