= Black Hills (Imperial County) =

- Location within California

Highest point
- Elevation: 1,345 ft (410 m)

Geography
- Country: United States
- State: California
- District: Imperial County
- Range coordinates: 33°23′51.107″N 115°2′33.891″W
- Topo map: USGS Little Chuckwalla Mountains

The Black Hills are a mountain range in Imperial County, California.
