= Black Hill (Sidlaw Hills) =

Highest point
- Elevation: 360 m (1,180 ft)
- Coordinates: 56°28′25″N 3°16′6″W

Geography
- Location: Perth & Kinross, Scotland
- Parent range: Sidlaw Hills
- Topo map: OS Landranger 53

Climbing
- Easiest route: Walk through Heather from Dunsinane Hill

Black Hill is one of the steepest hills of the Sidlaw range in South East Perthshire. Black Hill is located near Collace and is smaller than King's Seat and Higher than Dunsinane Hill,
