= Black Hills (Contra Costa County) =

- Location within California

Highest point
- Elevation: 295 m (968 ft)

Geography
- Country: United States
- State: California
- District: Contra Costa County
- Range coordinates: 37°55′12.728″N 122°11′33.881″W
- Topo map: USGS Briones Valley

The Black Hills are a mountain range in Contra Costa County, California.
