= Wente Vineyards =

American vineyard located in California

Coordinates: 37°37′25.77″N 121°45′24.84″W

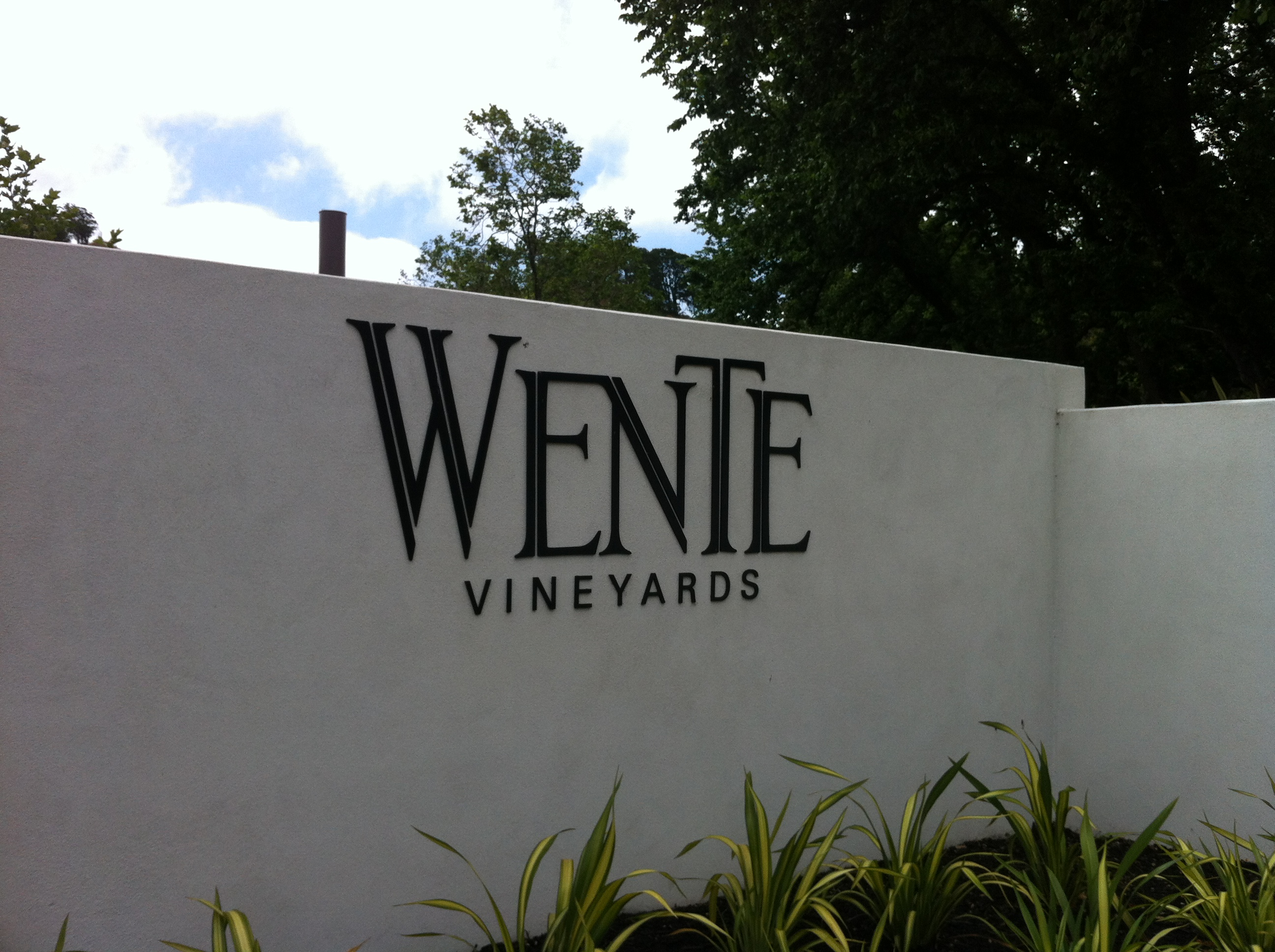
- Location: Livermore, California, USA
- Appellation: Livermore Valley AVA
- Formerly: Wente Brothers
- Other labels: The Nth Degree; Small Lot
- Founded: 1883
- Key people: Karl D. Wente, winemaker Peter Yeung, CEO
- Known for: Charles Wetmore Cabernet Sauvignon
- Varietals: Cabernet Sauvignon, Merlot, Zinfandel, Pinot Noir, Syrah, Chardonnay, Viognier, Sauvignon Blanc, Riesling
- Website: www.wentevineyards.com

California Historical Landmark
- Reference no.: 957

Wente Family Vineyards is a winery in Livermore, California, which is "the oldest continuously operating, family-owned winery in the United States." The Wente Estate is registered as a California Historical Landmark #957. The estate is renowned for developing one of the most popular Chardonnay clones in the United States, in addition to preserving Sauvignon Blanc Clone 1 in California.

== History ==
The winery was established by C.H. Wente in 1883 on 50 acres of land. Having received training in wines while working for Charles Krug of Napa Valley, Wente purchased a few vineyards and land with ideal soil for grape growing. Wente produced sacramental wines throughout prohibition to keep the winery and vineyards in production. After the repeal of the National Prohibition Act (Volstead Act) in 1933, Ernest and his brother Herman Wente released the nation’s first varietally labeled Chardonnay, a 1936 vintage, following their launch of California's first varietal wine label, Sauvignon Blanc and in 1936, they introduced the first vintage labeled Chardonnay. The efforts of the Wente family pioneered night-time mechanical harvesting, led in sustainable viticulture practices and established the Livermore Valley as one of the premier wine-growing areas of California. Since then, it has expanded to over 2,000 acres (809 ha), plus an additional 700 acres (283 ha)) in Arroyo Seco located in the Salinas Valley.

Ernest and his son Karl L. Wente pioneered new vineyard plantings in 1964 in the Arroyo Seco region of Monterey County. Here they plant Pinot Noir, Riesling, and Chardonnay.

In 1966, Wente Vineyards Tasting Room opens in Livermore Valley, and is one of the first tasting rooms in California. The tasting room now includes a restaurant and full 18-hole golf course.

== Wente clone ==
The Wente clone is budwood that is used to plant Chardonnay at many California vineyards. In 1908 Ernest Wente selected cuttings from the Theodore Gier Vineyard in Pleasanton and planted the initial Chardonnay on C.H. Wente's Hayes ranch. In 1912, 2nd Generation Winegrower Ernest Wente while at UC Davis ordered cuttings with the assistance of Professor Leon Bonnet from the F. Richter Nursery in Montpellier France. Cuttings from the Wente vineyard then spread to a number of other wineries after Prohibition, before eventually being certified by the Foundation Plant Materials Service of the University of California, Davis. Clones taken from the certified vines are known as "Wente" or "heat-treated Wente," and clones taken from vines before certification are known as "Old Wente."

== Estate ==
Wente Vineyards also offers a golf course, tasting room, and private and public events.
