= American Viticultural Area =

Designated wine grape-growing region in the U.S.

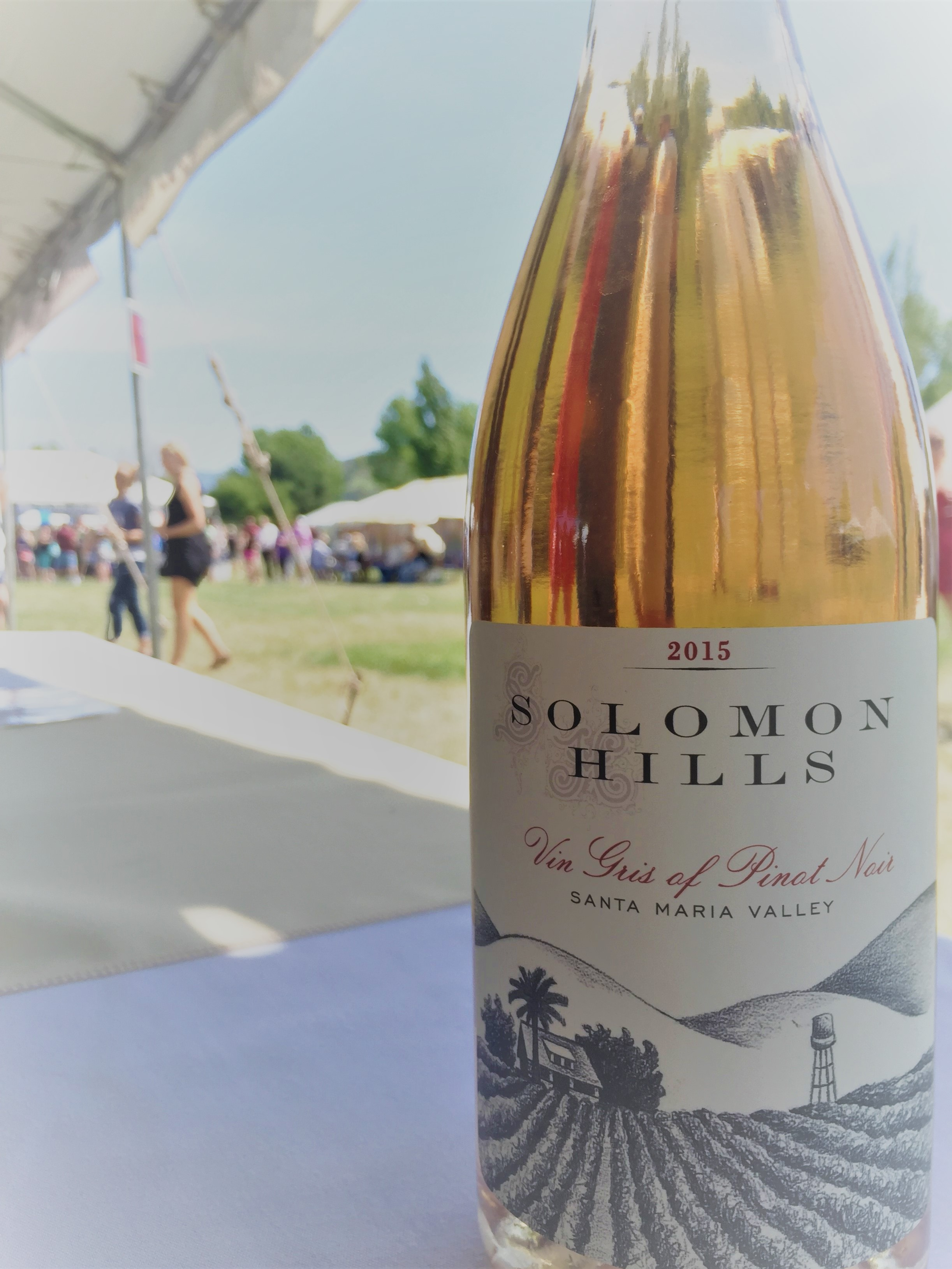
A bottle of wine from the Santa Maria Valley AVA, the nation's third American Viticultural Area established in 1981

An American Viticultural Area (AVA) is a designated wine grape-growing region in the United States, providing an official appellation for the mutual benefit of wineries and consumers. Winemakers frequently want their consumers to know about the geographic pedigree of their wines, as wines from a particular area can possess distinctive characteristics. Consumers often seek out wines from specific AVAs, and certain wines of particular pedigrees can claim premium prices and loyal customers. If a wine is labeled with an AVA, at least 85% of the grapes that make up the wine must have been grown in the AVA, and the wine must be fully finished within the state where the AVA is located.

== Regulations ==
Since 1980, the boundaries of AVAs were defined by the Bureau of Alcohol, Tobacco and Firearms (ATF), an independent bureau within the United States Department of the Treasury that received and handled petitions for viticultural areas, wine production and labeling. In January 2003, under the provisions of the Homeland Security Act of 2002, the ATF was extensively reorganized and the Alcohol and Tobacco Tax and Trade Bureau (TTB) was created to oversee viticultural areas and wine production and labeling.

Section 4.25(e)(2) of the regulations (27 C.F.R. § 4.25(e)(2)) outlines the procedure for proposing an AVA and provides that any interested party may petition the TTB to establish a grape-growing region as an AVA. Section 9.12 of the TTB regulations (27 C.F.R. § 9.12) prescribes the standards for petitions for the establishment or modification of AVAs. Petitions to establish an AVA must include the following:

- Evidence that the area within the proposed AVA boundary is nationally or locally known by the AVA name specified in the petition;
- An explanation of the basis for defining the boundary of the proposed AVA;
- A narrative description of the features of the proposed AVA affecting viticulture, such as climate, geology, soils, physical features, and elevation, that make the proposed AVA distinctive and distinguish it from adjacent areas outside the proposed AVA;
- The appropriate United States Geological Survey (USGS) map(s) showing the location of the proposed AVA, with the boundary of the proposed AVA clearly drawn thereon;
- An explanation of how of the proposed AVA is sufficiently distinct from an existing AVA so as to warrant separate recognition, if the proposed AVA is to be established within, or overlapping, an existing AVA; and
- A detailed narrative description of the proposed AVA boundary based on USGS map markings.

Once a petition is accepted as complete, the TTB may choose to seek public input on the proposal and at its sole discretion may approve the proposed AVA.

Before the AVA system, wine appellations of origin in the United States were designated based on state or county boundaries. All of these appellations were grandfathered into federal regulations and may appear on wine labels as designated places of origin in lieu of an AVA, such as Sonoma County. In order for a wine to be labeled with a state or county appellation, at least 75% of the grapes used to make the wine must have been grown within the boundary of the appellation, and the wine must be fully finished within the state in which the appellation is located. Some states have more stringent rules, such as California, which requires 100% of the grapes used to make the wine be from California and that the wine be fully finished within the state. Washington requires 95% of the grapes in a Washington wine be grown in Washington, although notably the Columbia Valley AVA, Columbia Gorge AVA, and Walla Walla Valley AVA are shared with Oregon.

== Around the country ==
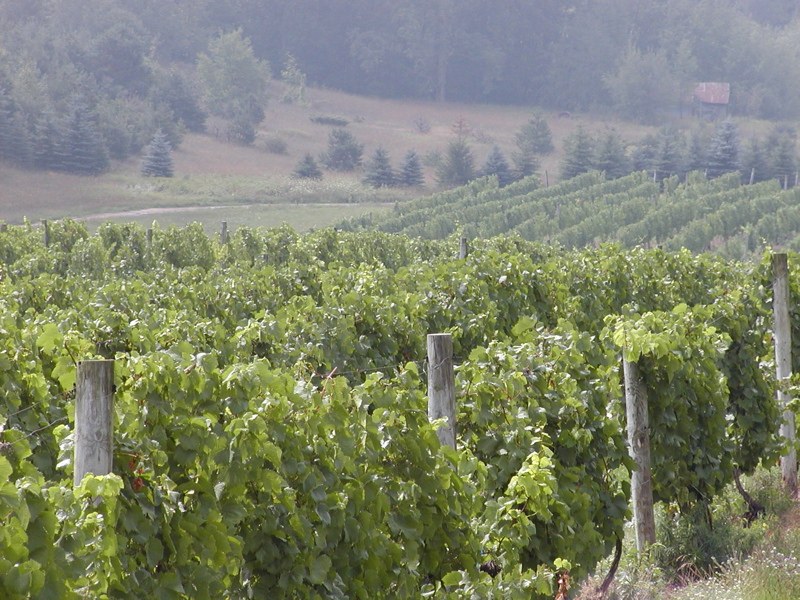
A vineyard in the Leelanau Peninsula AVA, in Michigan. Michigan is home to five AVAs, all adjacent to Lake Michigan.

AVAs vary widely in size, ranging from the large Upper Mississippi River Valley AVA, at more than 19 million acres (29,900 square miles (77,000 km^{2})) extending across four states, (Illinois, Iowa, Minnesota, and Wisconsin), to the smallest, Ulupalakua AVA on island of Maui, Hawaii being only 70 acres (28 ha) as of 2026.

The Augusta AVA that surrounds the town of Augusta, Missouri was the initial federally established viticultural area on June 20, 1980. There are currently 280 AVAs spread across 34 states, with over half (154) in California.

An AVA may be located within one or more larger AVAs. For example, the Santa Clara Valley AVA and Livermore Valley AVA are located within the boundaries of the San Francisco Bay AVA, which is itself located within the Central Coast AVA. In such cases, the wine may be labeled with any of the relevant AVAs, but winemakers generally label wines with the most specific AVA allowed for each wine. Smaller AVAs are often perceived to be associated with smaller production and higher quality wines, though this is not always the case. See map on the right showing the outline of the Paso Robles AVA, California's largest in total area, and the eleven distinct AVAs contained within it.

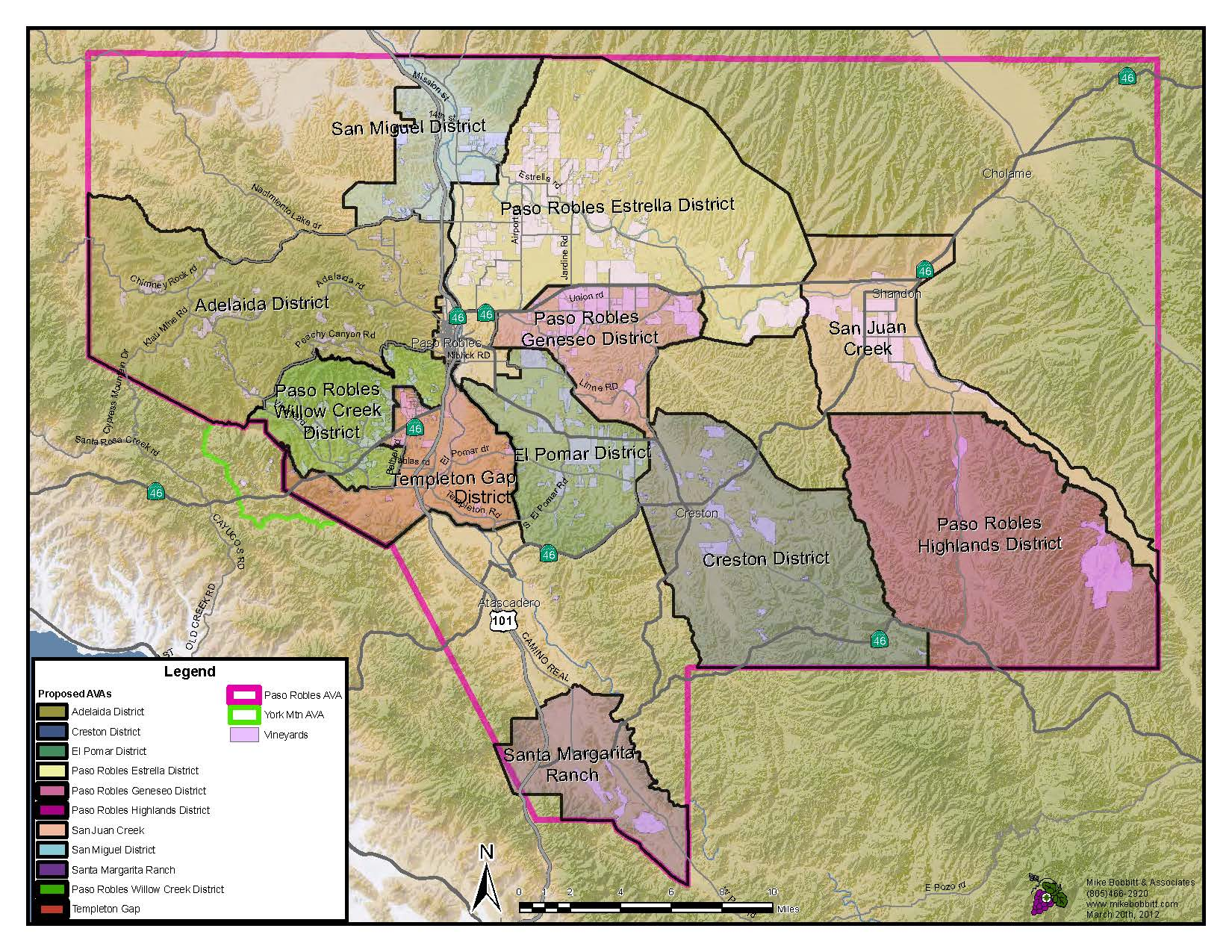
Paso Robles AVA in California's Central Coast.

In 2018, the second session of the 115th Congress recognized the contribution of American Viticultural Areas to the economy. The Blunt-Merkley Resolution passed unanimously. It noted that an AVA allows vintners to describe more accurately the origin of their wine, while helping vintners to build and enhance the reputation and value of the wines produced. AVAs also allow consumers to attribute a given quality, reputation, or other characteristic to a wine made from grapes grown in an AVA. AVAs also help consumers identify what they purchase.

== See also ==
- Appellation d'origine contrôlée (France)
- Denominazione di origine controllata (Italy)
  - Indicazione geografica tipica (Italy)
- Denominación de origen (Spain and Latin America)
- American wine
