= Robert Isaac Jones =

Welsh pharmacist, writer, and printer (1813–1905)

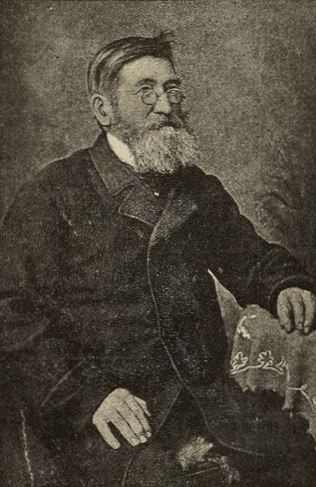
Robert Isaac Jones.

Robert Isaac Jones (1813 – 7 March 1905), also known under his bardic name Alltud Eifion, was a Welsh pharmacist, writer, and printer.

== Biography ==
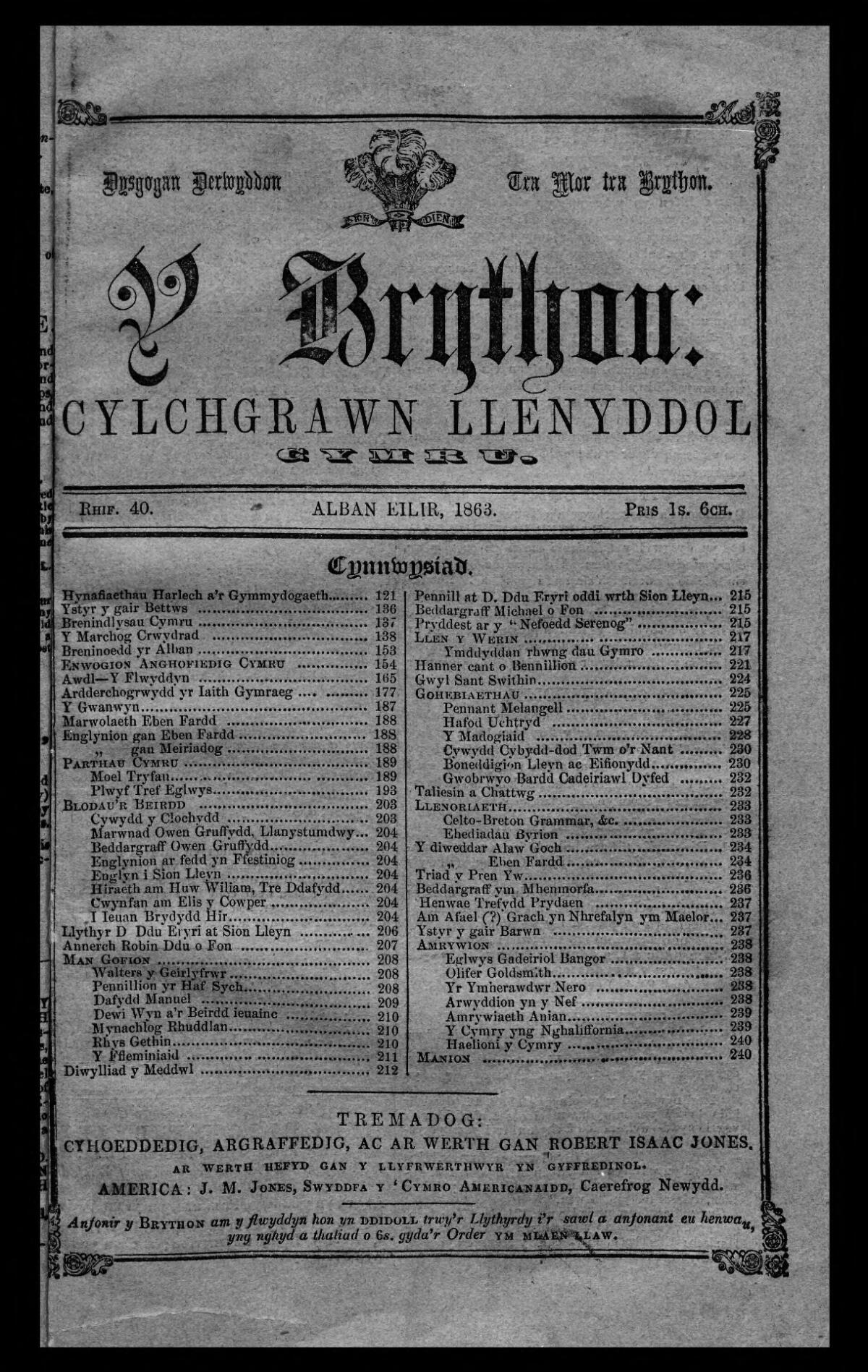
Y Brython, Jones' ill-fated newspaper.

Jones was born at Tyddyn Iolyn, Pentrefelin (near Porthmadog) in 1813. Here he was educated and, in 1831, moved to become an apprentice to a Pwllheli pharmacist. After this he moved to Caernarvon and London, before settling in Tremadoc.

In 1838, Jones opened his Tremadoc pharmacist, the Cambrian Pill Depôt. He gained some fame as the peddler of "Tremadoc Pills", which he claimed as an effective medicine for many different illnesses.

Jones was a keen printer, starting a Tremadoc printing-press where he printed several Welsh-language publications. He began a weekly newspaper, entitled Y Brython, in November 1858. This enterprise was unsuccessful, as it was reduced to a monthly publication by 1859, and ceased publication altogether in 1863, having obtained too little readership. Jones also published a biography of early black Welsh gardener, John Ystumllyn (d. 1786), collated from his family and local area's oral sources. This biography has proved invaluable to modern efforts to understand Ystumllyn. Ystumllyn's biographer, Andrew Green, admitted that, while "prone to variation, embroidery and forgetfulness", it survives as the most informative" and "frank" account of Ystumllyn's life.

Jones was also an active eisteddfodwr, an attendee of annual Welsh literary festivals, though he "did not excel", despite the copious amounts of poetry he produced, according to the Dictionary of Welsh Biography.

== Personal life and death ==
Jones was initially a Methodist, but left the church for the local Anglican church. He contributed to several religious journals - Yr Haul, Y Llan, and Cymru - and briefly refounded a pre-existing church periodical, Baner y Groes. Jones founded a Sunday school in the Tremadoc town hall.

Jones died on 7 March 1905, and was buried in St Cynhaearn's Church, Ynyscynhaearn.

== Publications ==
- Gwaith Barddonol Sion Wyn o Eifion (1861)
- (ed.) Cyff Beuno by Eben Fardd (1863)
- (ed.) Cell Meudwy by Ellis Owen (1877)
- John Ystumllyn (1888)
- Yr Emynydd Cristionogol (1889)
- Y Gestiana, sef, Hanes Tre'r Gest (1892)
