= List of works of art by John Ingleby =

This is a list of paintings by the Welsh topographical artist John Ingleby.

The collection of watercolours established at the National Library of Wales are mostly views of North Wales.

Image	Title	Date	Collection
	Aber Waterfall	1796	John Ingleby Watercolours
	Abernavas church & hall	1795	John Ingleby Watercolours
	Abervechan front	1796	John Ingleby Watercolours
	Abervechan rear	1796	John Ingleby Watercolours
	Anchoritage in St. John's Church yard, Chester; Remains of the monastery in St John's Church yard	1793	John Ingleby Watercolours
	Aston	1794	John Ingleby Watercolours
	Berrew	1796	John Ingleby Watercolours
	Berse Chapel	1794	John Ingleby Watercolours
	Bettws	1794	John Ingleby Watercolours
	Birch	1795	John Ingleby Watercolours
	Breiddin Hills, Rodney's Pillar and Belin Mount	1794	John Ingleby Watercolours
	Breyden Hills from Llanymynech and Rodney's Pillar	1795	John Ingleby Watercolours
	Brumbo House	1794	John Ingleby Watercolours
	Bryn Euryn	1795	John Ingleby Watercolours
	Bryn Euryn, & distant view of Penmon Rhos	1795	John Ingleby Watercolours
	Bryn Tirion looking up; Bryn Tyrion looking down, near Skiviog	1795	John Ingleby Watercolours
	Bryn-Gwyn	1795	John Ingleby Watercolours
	Castell Caerenion	1794	John Ingleby Watercolours
	Cefn Amwlch	1796	John Ingleby Watercolours
	Cefn, a new house near Wrexham (belonging to Roger Kenyon Esq)	1795	John Ingleby Watercolours
	Chapel at Lower Berwick	1796	John Ingleby Watercolours
	Chirbury	1795	John Ingleby Watercolours
	Chirk	1793	John Ingleby Watercolours
	Chirk Church, aqueduct & castle, Denbighshire	1795	John Ingleby Watercolours
	Chirton Hall	1793	John Ingleby Watercolours
	Conway Castle from the e(ast)	1795	John Ingleby Watercolours
	Conway from above the Ferry	1795	John Ingleby Watercolours
	Conway, from the Talycafn road	1795	John Ingleby Watercolours
	Croesnewydd near Wrexham S.E. view property of Ellice Esq	1796	John Ingleby Watercolours
	Crucifixion found in the wall of the old church at Halkin	1795	John Ingleby Watercolours
	Dintle	1796	John Ingleby Watercolours
	Doddleston Church	1795	John Ingleby Watercolours
	Dongay	1795	John Ingleby Watercolours
	Ecclusham Above, the property of Ellames Esq. near Wrexham	1794	John Ingleby Watercolours
	Ecclusham Below	1794	John Ingleby Watercolours
	Effigy of a warrior	1796	John Ingleby Watercolours
	Farn	1793	John Ingleby Watercolours
	Fron Ynys & Llangwyfan Church; Plas Llangwyfan	1793	John Ingleby Watercolours
	Garth	1796	John Ingleby Watercolours
	Gillesfield near Welshpool	1796	John Ingleby Watercolours
	Golden chalice in Welshpool Church	1794	John Ingleby Watercolours
	Grafton Hall	1793	John Ingleby Watercolours
	Halton	1794	John Ingleby Watercolours
	Harlech Castle from the town	1795	John Ingleby Watercolours
	Hendom, or, the Mount of Owen Glendwr near Corwen on the Dee	1794	John Ingleby Watercolours
	Hengwst	1793	John Ingleby Watercolours
	Holt Bridge; Farn., Holt	1793	John Ingleby Watercolours
	Inside of the cave, Llanarmon,	1795	John Ingleby Watercolours
	Kinmael	1795	John Ingleby Watercolours
	Kinmael	1794	John Ingleby Watercolours
	Limor Lodge	1795	John Ingleby Watercolours
	Limor Lodge	1794	John Ingleby Watercolours
	Limor Lodge east aspect	1795	John Ingleby Watercolours
	Llai, near Hope	1794	John Ingleby Watercolours
	Llan Sain Siôr, or, Church of St. George and rectory	1794	John Ingleby Watercolours
	Llanafryn	1795	John Ingleby Watercolours
	Llandinam	1794	John Ingleby Watercolours
	Llandinam and Gwernwr Hills	1794	John Ingleby Watercolours
	Llandreinio	1794	John Ingleby Watercolours
	Llandreinio Bridge and Rodney's Pillar	1794	John Ingleby Watercolours
	Llandreinio Hall	1794	John Ingleby Watercolours
	Llandrillo Church,	1795	John Ingleby Watercolours
	Llandyrnog church and churchyard	1795	John Ingleby Watercolours
	Llandysilio and Llanymynach rocks	1794	John Ingleby Watercolours
	Llanfechan	1795	John Ingleby Watercolours
	Llangedwyn	1795	John Ingleby Watercolours
	Llangedwyn church	1795	John Ingleby Watercolours
	Llangollen, Castle Dinas Bran	1793	John Ingleby Watercolours
	Llangollen, from ye Corwen road	1795	John Ingleby Watercolours
	Llangynog	1794	John Ingleby Watercolours
	Llangynyw	1794	John Ingleby Watercolours
	Llanllwchaiarn	1796	John Ingleby Watercolours
	Llanllwchaiarn Church	1796	John Ingleby Watercolours
	Llanrhaeadr-ym-Mochnant	1795	John Ingleby Watercolours
	Llansanfraid Bridge, Glyndwrdwy	1794	John Ingleby Watercolours
	Llansanfraid Glyndwrdwy	1794	John Ingleby Watercolours
	Llanwynog near Newtown	1794	John Ingleby Watercolours
	Llwydiarth	1794	John Ingleby Watercolours
	Llwyn	1794	John Ingleby Watercolours
	Lord Boston's the old front. Llanidan Church	1795	John Ingleby Watercolours
	Loton Hall	1796	John Ingleby Watercolours
	Loton Hall,	1796	John Ingleby Watercolours
	Lower Berwick	1796	John Ingleby Watercolours
	Lyn-y-Pandy, or, The Black Valley	1796	John Ingleby Watercolours
	Maes y Coed; Llan Bychan Church	1793	John Ingleby Watercolours
	Meifod	1795	John Ingleby Watercolours
	Moel-du-mawr	1795	John Ingleby Watercolours
	Mold	1795	John Ingleby Watercolours
	Montford	1796	John Ingleby Watercolours
	Montford Bridge	1794	John Ingleby Watercolours
	Montgomery castle & church	1793	John Ingleby Watercolours
	Monument of—Lister Esq, of Routon	1795	John Ingleby Watercolours
	Monument of Richard Herbert in Montgomery Church	1796	John Ingleby Watercolours
	Monument of Richard Lister Esq. of Routon	1795	John Ingleby Watercolours
	Monument of Richard Onslow in old St. Chad's Church	1796	John Ingleby Watercolours
	Mount in Wrexham	1793	John Ingleby Watercolours
	Mrs Williams monument	1796	John Ingleby Watercolours
	Mural brass of a priest in Bettws Church	1794	John Ingleby Watercolours
	Nantcribba	1796	John Ingleby Watercolours
	New bridge & aqueduct, Rhiwabon	1795	John Ingleby Watercolours
	New goal at Shrewsbury	1796	John Ingleby Watercolours
	Old chapel in Caernarvon town	1796	John Ingleby Watercolours
	Old Kinmael	1795	John Ingleby Watercolours
	Oldford, Cheshire	1793	John Ingleby Watercolours
	Onslow	1794	John Ingleby Watercolours
	Park	1794	John Ingleby Watercolours
	Park	1796	John Ingleby Watercolours
	Part of the aqueduct at Chirk	1795	John Ingleby Watercolours
	Pen-y-Fron	1796	John Ingleby Watercolours
	Pentre Eychan	1794	John Ingleby Watercolours
	Pistyl-y-Rhaidr	1796	John Ingleby Watercolours
	Pistyll y Rhaeadr	1796	John Ingleby Watercolours
	Plas Gronow	1794	John Ingleby Watercolours
	Plas Mostyn	1793	John Ingleby Watercolours
	Plas yn Llan and Llan Gynhafel Church; Plas yn Rhos, property of Wynne Esq, near Ruthin	1793	John Ingleby Watercolours
	Plas yn Yale, seat of the Yale's	1795	John Ingleby Watercolours
	Powis Castle	1794	John Ingleby Watercolours
	Powis Castle	1795	John Ingleby Watercolours
	Prison of Owen Glendwr	1794	John Ingleby Watercolours
	Red Hall	1795	John Ingleby Watercolours
	Rhiwabon	1794	John Ingleby Watercolours
	Routon	1796	John Ingleby Watercolours
	Sepulchral stones	1795	John Ingleby Watercolours
	Sh(r)awardine	1796	John Ingleby Watercolours
	Shrine of St. Monacella in Pennant Melangel Church	1795	John Ingleby Watercolours
	Sir Thomas Hanmer's monument, Hanmer Chapel	1794	John Ingleby Watercolours
	Sontly	1793	John Ingleby Watercolours
	South aspect of Caergwrle Castle	1795	John Ingleby Watercolours
	St. Chad's new church, Shrewsbury	1796	John Ingleby Watercolours
	St. Monacella, or, Pennant Melangell Church	1795	John Ingleby Watercolours
	Statue of a boy from Herculaneum	1795	John Ingleby Watercolours
	The abbots house at Alberbury	1796	John Ingleby Watercolours
	The cotton factory near Mold	1795	John Ingleby Watercolours
	The stone under this arch called Carreg Carn March Arthur	1796	John Ingleby Watercolours
	The upper gate, Conwy	1795	John Ingleby Watercolours
	Tomen y Faerdre & cave, Llanarmon,	1795	John Ingleby Watercolours
	Tower of Brynia	1795	John Ingleby Watercolours
	Town Hall Shrewsbury and the Old Market House	1796	John Ingleby Watercolours
	Trenewydd, or, Newtown Hall	1796	John Ingleby Watercolours
	Upper Berwick	1794	John Ingleby Watercolours
	Vale of Meifod	1795	John Ingleby Watercolours
	Vaynor	1796	John Ingleby Watercolours
	Vaynor House	1796	John Ingleby Watercolours
	View between Fittes & Shrewsbury	1796	John Ingleby Watercolours
	View from Cefn Ucha	1796	John Ingleby Watercolours
	View from Eccleston Hill of Chester &c	1794	John Ingleby Watercolours
	View from Llyn-y-pandy	1796	John Ingleby Watercolours
	View from the Loggerheads	1796	John Ingleby Watercolours
	View in Erddig grounds	1794	John Ingleby Watercolours
	View in the footway between Eaton and Eccleston from the banks of the Dee	1793	John Ingleby Watercolours
	View near Cefn-ogo	1796	John Ingleby Watercolours
	View near Llangollen, Denbighshire	1795	John Ingleby Watercolours
	View near Tal y cafn, looking towards Llanrwst	1795	John Ingleby Watercolours
	View of Llandysilio & Castell Dinas Brân	1795	John Ingleby Watercolours
	View of Shrewsbury from the new bridge	1796	John Ingleby Watercolours
	View of the River Dee with Eccleston Church and distant view of Chester	1794	John Ingleby Watercolours
	View of the River Severn	1796	John Ingleby Watercolours
	View of the Severn & Isle of Up Rossal and distant view of Shrewsbury	1796	John Ingleby Watercolours
	View on the River Dee near Llandysilio	1795	John Ingleby Watercolours
	Wattleburgh Castle	1796	John Ingleby Watercolours
	Welshpool	1794	John Ingleby Watercolours
	Whittington church and castle	1793	John Ingleby Watercolours
	Willington Cross	1795	John Ingleby Watercolours
	Wynne Stay, seat of Sir Watkins Williams Wynne	1793	John Ingleby Watercolours
	Y Drenewydd, or, New Town	1794	John Ingleby Watercolours
	Ystumllyn	1794	John Ingleby Watercolours
