= Mostyn Thomas =

Mostyn Thomas (born Thomas James Thomas) (January 14, 1896 – August 17, 1984) was a Welsh operatic baritone, prominent in the first half of the 20th century.

== Early life ==
He was born in Blaina, Monmouthshire, to Thomas and Ann. At the age of 13 he went to work underground in the local colliery.

== Voice ==
His voice was discovered at the Ammanford Eisteddfod, and the local community of Blaina collected money for him to be trained at La Scala Milan. Mostyn has his debut as Tonio in Pagliacci (Leoncavallo) in 1929.

He sang leading baritone roles all over the world, settled in America and married a wealthy American widow. On February 13, 1923, Mostyn Thomas sang Dafydd y Garreg Wen to inaugurate the first radio broadcast by BBC.
