= John Ystumllyn =

Black Welsh gardener (c. 1738–1786)

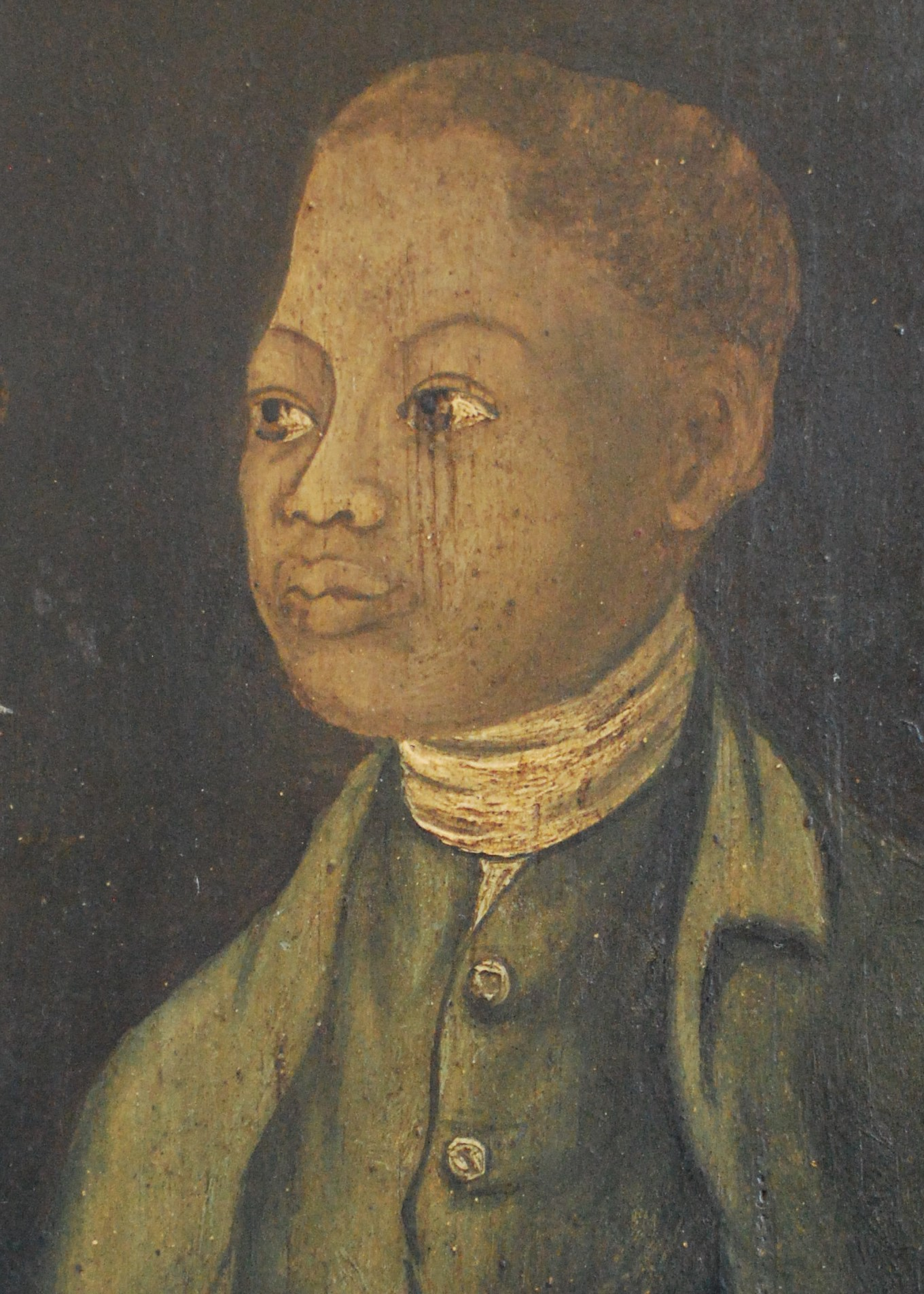
- Portrait of John Ystumllyn, dated to 11 May 1754, depicting Ystumllyn as a teenager
- Born: c. 1738; Either West Africa or the West Indies
- Died: 1786
- Burial place: St Cynhaearn's Church, Ynyscynhaearn, Gwynedd, Wales
- Other names: Jac Du; Jack Black
- Occupation: Gardener

John Ystumllyn (c. 1738–1786), also colloquially known as Jac Du or Jack Black, was an 18th-century gardener and the first well-recorded person of African descent in North Wales.

John was of uncertain origin, possibly a victim of the Atlantic slave trade, and from either West Africa or the West Indies. As a child, he was taken by the Wynn family to its Ystumllyn estate in Criccieth, where he was christened with the name John Ystumllyn. Here he was taught English and Welsh by the locals. He learned horticulture and craftsmanship, at which he had some natural skill, in the estate garden. He worked as a gardener at the estate and eventually "grew into a handsome and vigorous young man", his portrait painted at around this time. Doted upon by several local girls, he began a romance with a local maid, Margaret Gruffydd.

As Margaret moved to different employments Ystumllyn followed her, eventually running away from his job as gardener to marry in 1768. They had seven children, five of whom survived, with several of their descendants still living in the area as of 2019. They initially worked as land stewards, but Ystumllyn eventually re-entered into the employment of the Wynn family. In recognition of his service, Ellis Wynn gave Ystumllyn a large garden and cottage at Y Nhyra Isa. Ystumllyn died in 1786; his wife, Margaret, outlived him by more than forty years.

Ystumllyn was well-liked in his lifetime and met with little racial prejudice, though locals often expressed surprise at his unfamiliar appearance. Several years after his death, a small monument was constructed in his place of burial St Cynhaearn's Church. Over a hundred years after Ystumllyn's death, the Welsh writer Robert Isaac Jones published an account of Ystumllyn's life compiled from various local oral records. This work, while also criticised for its "forgetfulness" and "racial stereotyping", serves as "the most informative" extant source of Ystumllyn's life. According to Jones, Ystumllyn was "a very honest man, with no malice, and was respected by the gentry and the common people alike".

== Sources ==
Several Black Welsh individuals are recorded as living in Wales before Ystumllyn, mainly employed as servants and musicians to landowners and the aristocracy, following the vogue in Britain. Welsh historian David Morris has identified 29 black people in South Wales parish registers between 1687 and 1814, including a horn player of Erddig whose master had his portrait painted. Ystumllyn's biographer, Andrew Green, speculates that yet "more remain to be discovered" in North Wales, even if "their absolute numbers were small". Despite this, Ystumllyn has been described as the first black person of North Wales "about whom we have detailed knowledge" by Green, writing for the Oxford Dictionary of National Biography. Ystumllyn's life is known from three sources, "all of them remarkable", according to Green.

The earliest is a small oil painting on wood produced by an unknown artisan artist, with a date and identification at the foot: "John Ystymllyn, 11 May 1754". This portrait shows his features as a young man, wearing a green jacket, green buttoned waistcoat and white neckband, garments typical of his working position.

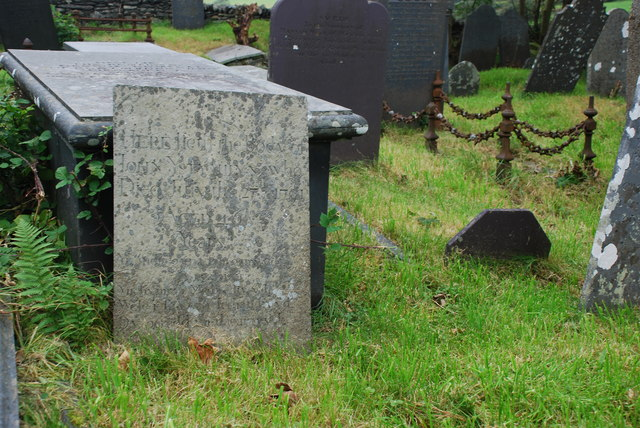
John Ystumllyn's grave at St Cynhaearn's Church

The next is his simple sandstone memorial in the graveyard of St Cynhaearn's Church, Ynyscynhaearn, a former parish church now under the administration of the Friends of Friendless Churches. Here, Ystumllyn was possibly baptised, and was certainly buried in 1786. The memorial was erected posthumously. In 1999, it was made a Grade II listed building "as of special interest in commemorating a slave in service in Wales in the later years of the C18 [18th-century], who must have been well enough thought of that he was provided with a handsome memorial". The memorial's inscription gives his age at the time of death as forty-six, but incorrectly gives his date of death as 1791. It bears a bleak, biographical englyn, composed by the Penrhyndeudraeth musician and poet Dafydd Siôn Siâms (1743–1831):

Welsh

Yn India gynna'm ganwyd a nghamrau
Yng Nghymru'm bedyddiwyd
Wele'r fan dan lechan lwyd
Du oeraidd y'm daearwyd.

English

Born in India, to Wales I came
To be baptised
See this spot, a grey slate marks
My cold resting place.

Much of what is known about Ystumllyn comes from a short Welsh-language pamphlet, John Ystumllyn neu 'Jack Black' (1888), written by the Tremadog writer Robert Isaac Jones (1813–1905). It was published under his bardic name Alltud Eifion, and was written 102 years after Ystumllyn's death. Jones collated various oral traditions about the gardener that had passed down through his family, largely from his grandfather who had been Ystumllyn's doctor near the end of his life. This publication was subsequently adapted into Jones' Y Gestiana (1892), and translated into English by the local canon Tom Morris.

Green has acknowledged the inadequacies of Jones' work, often "prone to variation, embroidery and forgetfulness", but it remains, in his view, "the most informative" and "frank" source for Ystumllyn's life.

The work has been criticised by other Welsh sources, with the North Wales newspaper, The Daily Post, saying it is "peppered with racial stereotyping" in its biography of Ystumllyn, citing it in an editorial as an example of the early racial prejudice against black integration in Wales. Welsh historian Ffion Mair Jones concurs with this judgement, calling attention to the "racist overtones" in Jones' description of the 'taming' of the Black Ystumllyn. Yasmin Begum has pointed out how the names which Ystumllyn was known by (John Ystumllyn, Jack Black) were not given to him by his birth parents.

== Biography ==
Robert Isaac Jones begins his account of Ystumllyn's life, admitting his uncertain origins, and tracing three narratives of his arrival in Wales.

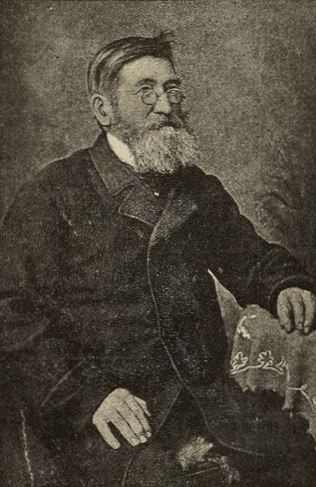
Robert Isaac Jones (1813–1905), who wrote a biographical pamphlet on Ystumllyn in Welsh

The first he sources to his own mother, claiming that a member of the Wynn family of Ystumllyn, possibly Ellis Wynn, "who had a Yacht, caught the boy in a wood in Africa and brought him home to Ystumllyn", where "they judged him to be about eight years old, and they took him to the Church in Criccieth, or Ynys[cynhaearn], to be christened, and called him John Ystumllyn". Ystumllyn's true birth name is unknown. Another narrative, derived from Ystumllyn's descendants, "stated that a number of black boys arrived in London, and that Ellis Wynne of Ystumllyn's sister, who lived in London, sent him as a gift to her brother". Green notes that Wynn's sister, Mary, married a William Hollier, perhaps the same Hollier who was the first secretary of the African Company of Merchants, an important character in the slave trade around the Gold Coast. The third account, from John himself, asserted that he was captured by white men while "on the banks of a stream amid woodland attempting to catch a moorhen", and was abducted and taken to their ship to the "frightful howls" of his mother. Green is skeptical of each of these stories, stating that, while it was "not inconceivable that Wynne was directly implicated in the slave trade", "it's much likelier that John came from a slave family in the West Indies", citing the reference to an Indian origin on his gravestone. Researcher Ffion Mair Jones, however, is more convinced by the kidnapping narrative as it is corroborated by Ystumllyn's own memories of his childhood.

John's arrival in Ystumllyn was marked by his knowledge of "no language other than sounds similar to the howling of a dog", in Jones' words; this was likely a West African language, unfamiliar to the Welsh locals. Jones speaks of the locals "domesticating" Ystumllyn, meeting with "considerable difficulty for a long time", first keeping him indoors, and – with the help of local women – teaching him fluency and literacy in both Welsh and English. Ystumllyn was then put in the garden, where he showed a gift for crafts and horticulture, and developed a fondness for floristry. According to Tom Morris, "it was remarked that this very black skin had very green fingers". He found employment on the Ystumllyn estate as a gardener, for what Morris reported was very low pay, his upkeep being "less costly than that of a racehorse". On 11 May 1754, he sat for his oil painting, at which time Jones estimated he was aged around sixteen.

Here, Ystumllyn "grew into a handsome and vigorous young man", according to Jones, and "there was much rivalry between [the young ladies of the area] in order to get John as a suitor." One unmarried maid from Hendre Mur, Trawsfynydd, Margaret Gruffydd, was tasked with bringing John "some bread, cheese and ale from the Plas". She was initially terrified of John and ran away upon the sight of him, but over time she grew more comfortable around him, and a romance developed. When Margaret moved to her relatives' nearby mansion, Ynysgain Bach, Criccieth, for domestic work available there, Ystumllyn continued his courtship of her. Jones recounts the shock of the house's master at Ystumllyn, stumbling across Ystumllyn in the kitchen, assured that he must be "the Black Devil" because of his dark skin. Margaret moved once again to Dolgellau, where Ystumllyn followed her. To pursue her further, Ystumllyn ran away from his job at Ystumllyn estate, with Margaret following him the next morning. The two were married on 9 April 1768, in Dolgellau, with Griffith Williams, son of the local vicar, as Ystumllyn's best man.

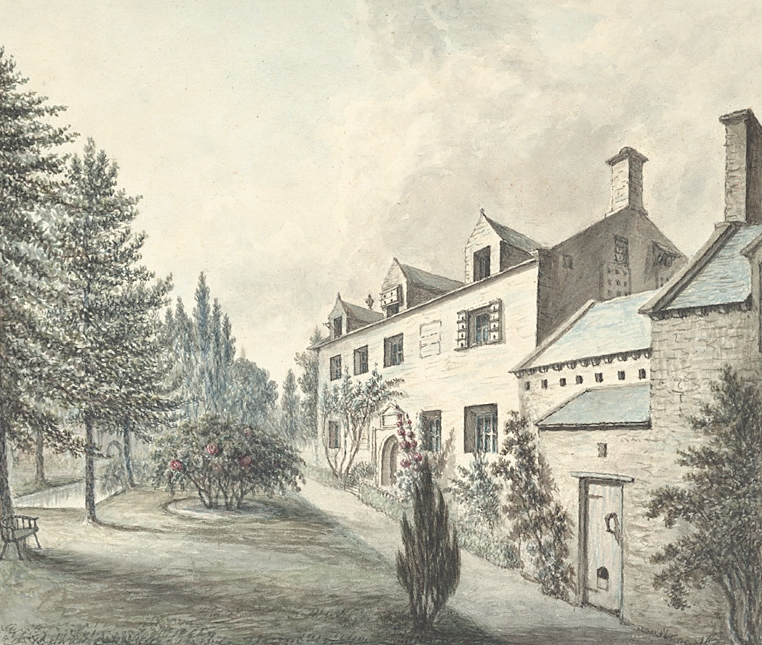
Engraving of Ystumllyn estate by John Ingleby, 1794

After their marriage, John and Margaret lived in Ynysgain Fawr, west of Criccieth, where they were employed as land stewards. They had seven children, with the first two dying while young, and the other five living to adulthood. As of 2019, several descendants of the Ystumllyn family still live in the area. John later worked at the home of Maesyneuadd, near Talsarnau, another estate of the Wynn family. Near the end of his life, in "recognition for his service", Ellis Wynn gave Ystumllyn the house of "Y Nhyra Isa" or "Nanhyran", a small thatched cottage surrounded by a large, ancient garden.

Ystumllyn died of jaundice, and was buried in St Cynhaearn's Church on 2 July 1786. Jones recounts that, on his deathbed, Ystumllyn told a neighbour "his main regret was that he played the crwth on Sundays at Ystumllyn and Masyneuoedd". Margaret died in 1828 at Y Nhyra Isa, at the age of eighty-one, outliving John by more than forty years. She was apparently in good health up to this point, being able to "see to sew and knit up until a few months before her death", and "was a quiet and cheerful old lady".The couple's only son, Richard Jones (d. 1862), is covered in detail in Jones's pamphlet; he lived until ninety-two, served under Spencer Bulkeley Wynn, 3rd Baron Newborough for fifty-eight years as his huntsman, and received a pension from the Baron in old age.

== Character and reputation ==
Jones concludes his account of Ystumllyn with several anecdotes of his character. According to Ffion Mair Jones, these stories "portray a man of firm morals, who responded robustly to the preconceptions of his contemporaries about him as the only black person in the neighbourhood, and who adhered to the truth in any case of wrong committed against him or false step of his own". Jones himself concurred that Ystumllyn was, by all accounts, a "very honest man, with no malice, and was respected by the gentry and the common people alike". "He was considered by the old folk as a very moral man. [...] The colour of his skin drew a lot of attention in those days, and his position with the most important gentry of the area, drew more of the attention of the common people, than anyone else."

The locals held many "strange ideas" about Ystumllyn because of his black skin, which Jones duly documented; two maids had wondered out loud if "that man's blood is red like the blood of white men", meeting with a sharp retort from Ystumllyn: "Silly fool, you kill a black hen and a white hen, and you'll see the blood of both is red." The local children apparently feared him, "because they had not seen a black man before". "Although the presence of a black man in Gwynedd inevitably aroused surprise and even shock", according to Green, "there's no suggestion that anyone held racist attitudes towards John". Green quotes one of Jones' anecdotes at length that, he claims, "reveals much about at least one person's 'blindness' to ethnicity:"

The late Ellis Owen, Cefnmeusydd, use to relate an interesting story about Margaret Jones, y Nhyra, at Penmorfa Fair when Richard her son (Richard Jones, Huntsman, Glynllifon, later) was around 2 years old, and she took him on her arm on the afternoon of the Mayday Fair, as was the practice in those days, and John Ystumllyn went to the Fair in the evening. The child saw his father a distance away and shouted "Dada, Dada"; then his mother said to her friends "have you seen such a smart child as this one, recognising his father among so many people," without considering that his father was black as soot in the midst of white people; as the old adage says – "The crow sees its chick as white" (Gwyn y gwêl y fran ei chyw).

== Legacy ==
Writing in 1962, Tom Morris described the story of Ystumllyn and Margaret surviving in Wales as "something of a legend; the memory of their courage – which braved the barriers of colour and class in 18th-century Wales – still lingers on". In 2018, celebrating Black History Month in the United Kingdom, John Ystumllyn was included in a list of 100 Brilliant, Black and Welsh people. In October 2019, again to celebrate Black History Month, the Oxford Dictionary of National Biography introduced 23 new biographies of black British people, curated by historians Miranda Kaufmann and Anders Ingram. This selection included Ystumllyn, who Ingram cited as "the most emblematic of the theme of this release", a man "whose settled life existence in rural Wales reminds us of the diversity of the historical experience of black people in Britain".

The Institute for the Study of Welsh Estates at Bangor University and Race Council Cymru organised an online conference celebrating John Ystumllyn as the Father of Black presence in North West Wales as part of Black History Cymru 365 in September 2021.

In June 2020, an article about Ystumllyn was written in HortWeek by Zehra Zaidi, a campaigner who set up We Too Built Britain to tell the stories of under-represented groups to show what we have in common (to then also be able to open up deeper conversations). During her research, she found out that despite the origins of the rose, there had never been a rose named after a British person of ethnic minority heritage. So she ended her article with a suggestion that it would be lovely if a rose could be created and named after John Ystumllyn as "like John and Margaret Ystumllyn, we are all romantics, in the end". The article became somewhat viral and led to members of the public contacting rose breeders to support Zaidi in creating a new rose. The Editor of HortWeek introduced Zaidi to Harkness Roses and they spent lockdown working on a new rose variety. The colour yellow was chosen for friendship, and Zaidi and Harkness Roses decided to launch the rose as a symbol of friendship, community and tolerance.

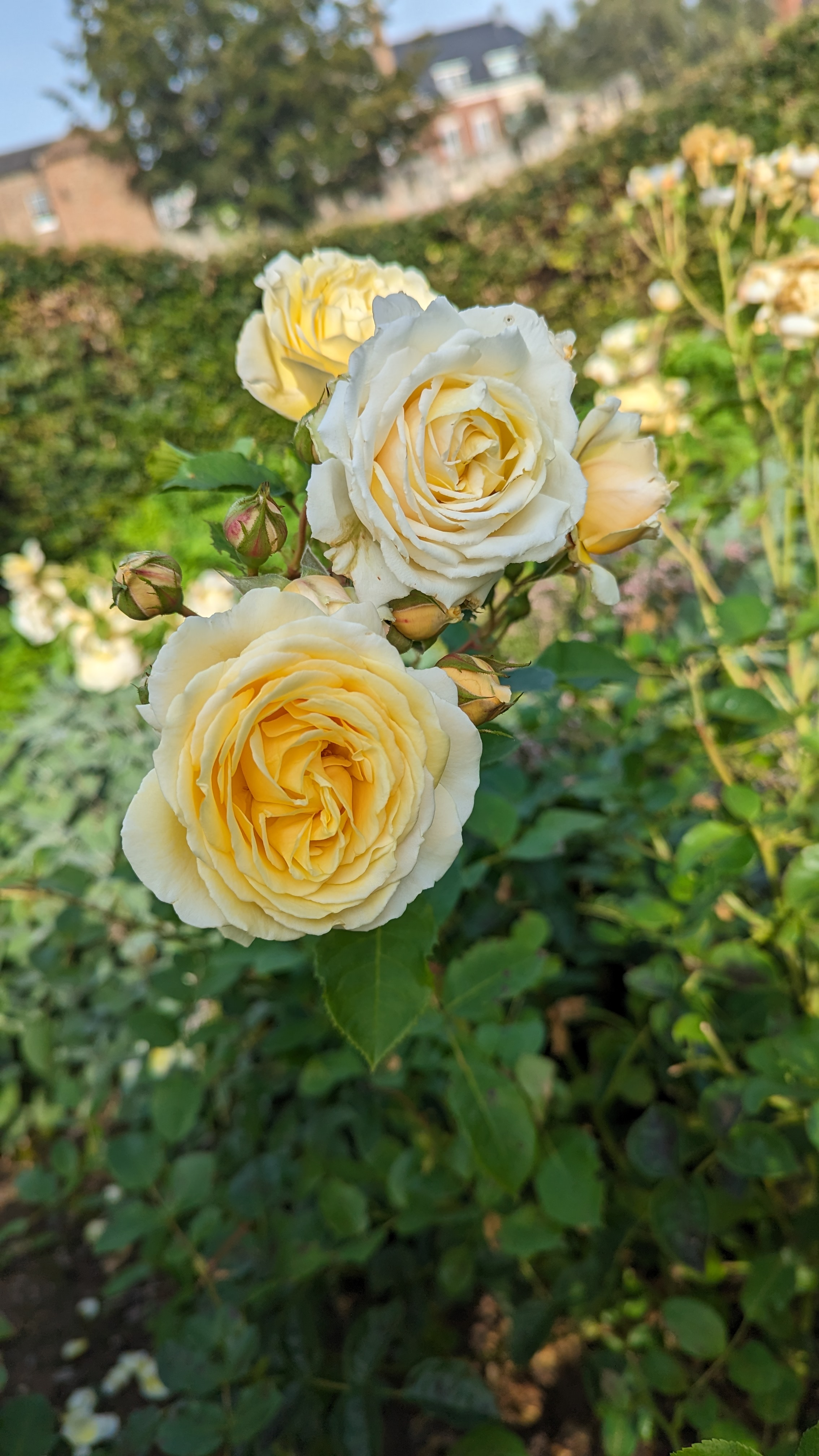
John Ystumllyn rose in Museum Gardens, York

In October 2021, a new rose variety was released in honour of Ystumllyn. It was the first rose in the UK to be named after a person of colour. The John Ystumllyn rose is a golden yellow hybrid tea rose. The rose was mentioned in the House of Commons by Liz Saville Roberts, the Plaid Cymru MP for the area where Ystumllyn lived, in a request for a debate on black history stories. The Leader of the House, Jacob Rees-Mogg replied: "If the Ystumllyn rose could be the rose of friendship across political parties, I think that's something we could plant with pride." A John Ystumllyn rose was planted in Buckingham Palace’s rose garden in May 2022, with a welcoming statement from Queen Elizabeth II: "The rose has been bred as a mark of friendship and community, and I hope guests and visitors to the garden will have the opportunity to reflect on what this rose represents for many years to come." Zaidi and Harkness Roses also worked on creating a community garden scheme along with the launch of the rose and each year, 5,000 roses have been donated by Harkness Roses to allotments, community gardens and charity gardens across the country, including twenty roses planted around Criccieth Library near where Ystumllyn lived.

Black British racing driver Lewis Hamilton wore an outfit to the 2024 Met Gala inspired by Ystumllyn's life, which included a quote from Alex Wharton, the Children’s Laureate Wales' poem "The Gardener", about Ystumllyn.

Ystumllyn's portrait was loaned to the British Library for the Unearthed: The Power of Gardening exhibition in 2025.

== See also ==
- Cesar Picton (1755–1836), a later black Briton, with a similar history involving a Welsh landowning family, but based at Picton Castle in Pembrokeshire and near London.
