= St Cynhaearn's Church, Ynyscynhaearn =

Coordinates: 52.9262°N 4.1945°W

St Cynhaearn's Church
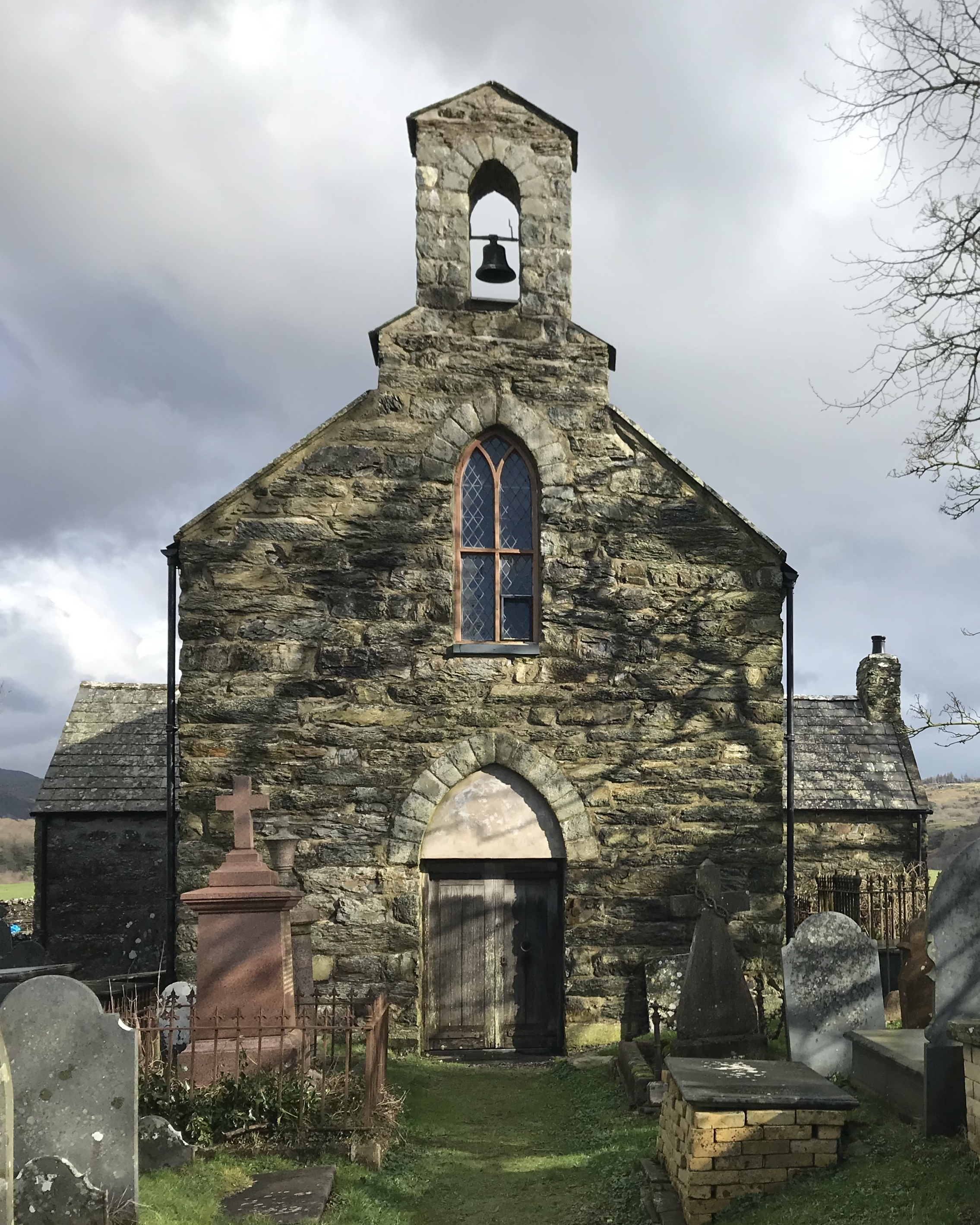
- St Cynhaearn's Church, Ynyscynhaearn, from the west

- Location in Gwynedd
- OS grid reference: SH 525 387
- Location: Near Pentrefelin, Gwynedd
- Country: Wales
- Denomination: Church in Wales
- Website: Friends of Friendless Churches

History
- Dedication: Saint Cynhaearn

Architecture
- Functional status: Redundant
- Heritage designation: Grade II*
- Designated: 19 October 1971
- Architectural type: Church
- Groundbreaking: 12th century
- Completed: 1622

Specifications
- Materials: Stone with slate roofs

St Cynhaearn's Church is a redundant church standing in an isolated position on Ynyscynhaearn, a former island in Llyn (Lake) Ystumllyn, 900 metres (980 yd) south of the village of Pentrefelin, near Criccieth in Gwynedd, Wales. It is designated by Cadw as a Grade II* listed building. The church is approached from the village by an ancient causeway, and is in the care of the Friends of Friendless Churches.

== History ==
The church is dedicated to Cynhaiarn, a 5th-century saint. It was originally the parish church for Porthmadog. Its nave dates from the 12th century, and the north transept was added in the 16th century. The south transept was built in 1622. Most of the interior fittings are Georgian in style and date from 1832. It came into the care of the Friends of Friendless Churches in 2003, since when repair work has been undertaken.

== Architecture ==
=== Structure ===
It is constructed in stone rubble, with the walls of the nave and the east side of the chancel being stucco. The roofs are of modern slates. Its plan consists of a short nave, north and south transepts, and a short chancel. At the west end is a bellcote. The entrance is through a west door. The windows in the nave and transepts have two lights, and at the east end are three lancet windows. The interior is plastered above a timber dado. The floor of the body of the church is stone-flagged, and there is a painted floor in the sanctuary. At the west end is a gallery.

=== Fittings and furniture ===
Dating from 1832, the pulpit is a three-decker, approached by nine steps, below which is a lectern with a reading shelf, and under this is the reader's desk. On each side of the altar are box pews. The gallery is supported on slender columns. The chamber organ by Flight and Robson dates from 1834 and was given by a Mrs Walker; it cost £30 (equivalent to £3,371 in 2025). It has a Gothic style case. On each side of it are six steeply raked pews and many carry the names of the families who used them. One of the pews is curtained off for mothers to feed their babies. The font stands on an octagonal pillar of limestone and was erected in 1900. There are also a number of memorials. The stained glass includes windows by James Powell and Sons dated 1899 and 1906.

== Memorials ==
An earlier grave records the early passing of David Owen (1712–1741), a local blind composer and harpist who was known as "Dafydd y Garreg Wen" or David of the White Rock, as he came from Garreg Wen (White Rock) Farm. Owen wrote a tune called Dafydd y Garreg Wen allegedly on his deathbed after calling for his harp.

Amongst the memorials is one to John Ystumllyn (d. 1786), also known as Jack Black. He was a black man brought back from Africa by a member of the Wynne family who lived at Ystumllyn, which can be seen from the church. It was fashionable at the time to have a black servant, and he was eventually given his own house. He had seven children and died at the end of the 18th century. Local people claim him as their ancestor.

There is a memorial to James Spooner (1790–1856), the surveyor who built the Ffestiniog Railway and members of his family, including his daughter, the novelist Louisa Matilda Spooner (1820–1886), in the form of a stone urn surrounded by iron railings. It is located alongside the boundary wall, to the right when facing the church from the gate.

There are also graves commemorating a range of local tradespeople, including a baker and a confectioner.
