= Tonio =

Tonio may refer to:

- Tonio (film), a 2016 Dutch film
- Tonio (software), a Vocaloid vocal
- Tonio Kröger, a novella by Thomas Mann
- Tonio Kröger (film), a film based on the novella
- Tonio (app), an audio-decoding-app
- Tonio (name), persons with this given name or nickname
- Tonio Trussardi, a character in JoJo’s Bizarre Adventure Diamond is Unbreakable by Hirohiko Araki

== See also ==
- Antonio
