= Dafydd y Garreg Wen =

Welsh folk song

Dafydd y Garreg Wen is a traditional Welsh musical air and folk song.

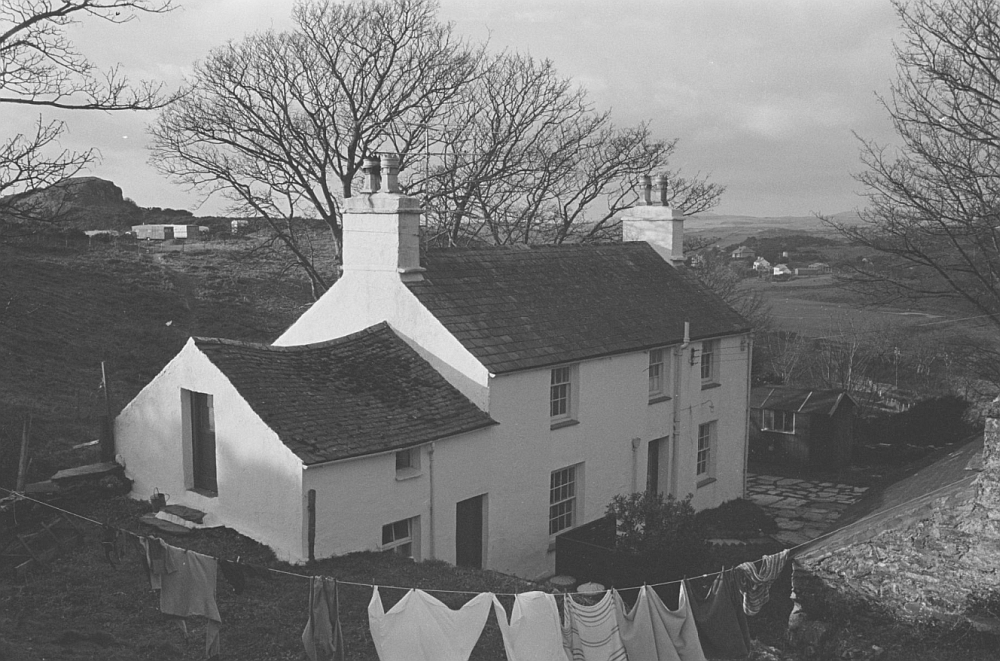
Garreg Wen near Porthmadog, home of the harpist Dafydd y Garreg Wen.

First 30 seconds of Dafydd y Garreg Wen, sung by Bryn Williams

There is a tradition that the tune was composed by David Owen (1712–1741), a harpist and composer who lived near Porthmadog in Caernarfonshire. He was known locally as Dafydd y Garreg Wen (English: David of the White Rock). Y Garreg Wen was the name of the farm where he lived near Morfa Bychan. There is a tradition that as Owen lay on his death bed, he called for his harp and composed the tune of the haunting song. He died at the age of 29 and was buried at St Cynhaearn's Church near Porthmadog.

The first printed appearance of the melody is in Edward Jones's Musical and Poetical Relicks of the Welsh Bards (1784)

The words were added more than a hundred years later by the poet John Ceiriog Hughes (1832–1887).

'Cariwch', medd Dafydd, 'fy nhelyn i mi, Ceisiaf cyn marw roi tôn arni hi. Codwch fy nwylo i gyraedd y tant; Duw a'ch bendithio fy ngweddw a'm plant!' 'Neithiwr mi glywais lais angel fel hyn: "Dafydd, tyrd adref, a chwarae trwy'r glyn!" Delyn fy mebyd, ffarwel i dy dant! Duw a'ch bendithio fy ngweddw a'm plant!'	'Bring me my harp', was David's sad sigh, 'I would play one more tune before I die. Help me, dear wife, put the hands to the strings, I wish my loved ones the blessing God brings.' 'Last night an angel called with heaven's breath: "David, play, and come through the gates of death!" Farewell, faithful harp, farewell to your strings, I wish my loved ones the blessing God brings.'

A more literal translation would be:-

'Carry', said David, 'my harp to me'
I would like, before dying, to give a tune on it (her)
Lift my hands to reach the strings
God bless you, my widow and children!

Last night I heard an angel's voice like this:
"David, come home and play through the glen!"
Harp of my youth, farewell to your strings!
God bless you, my widow and children!

Another version of this song begins with the line, "David, the Bard, on his bed of death lies", and continues with the second line of the verse being, "Pale are his features, and dim are his eyes". Owen is also well known for his air Codiad yr Ehedydd (English: Rising of the lark).

In 1923 the British Broadcasting Company made its first broadcast in Wales, from "Station 5WA" in Cardiff. Mostyn Thomas opened the programme, singing Dafydd y Garreg Wen, and so it became the very first Welsh language song to be played on the air.

An arrangement for military massed bands is played annually during the national remembrance Sunday celebrations led by His Majesty the King each November in Whitehall.

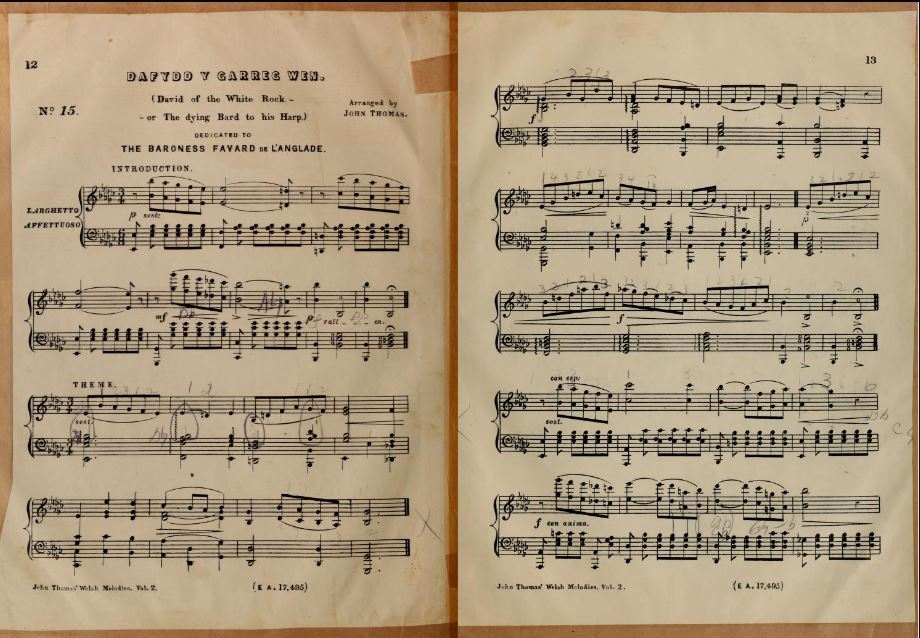
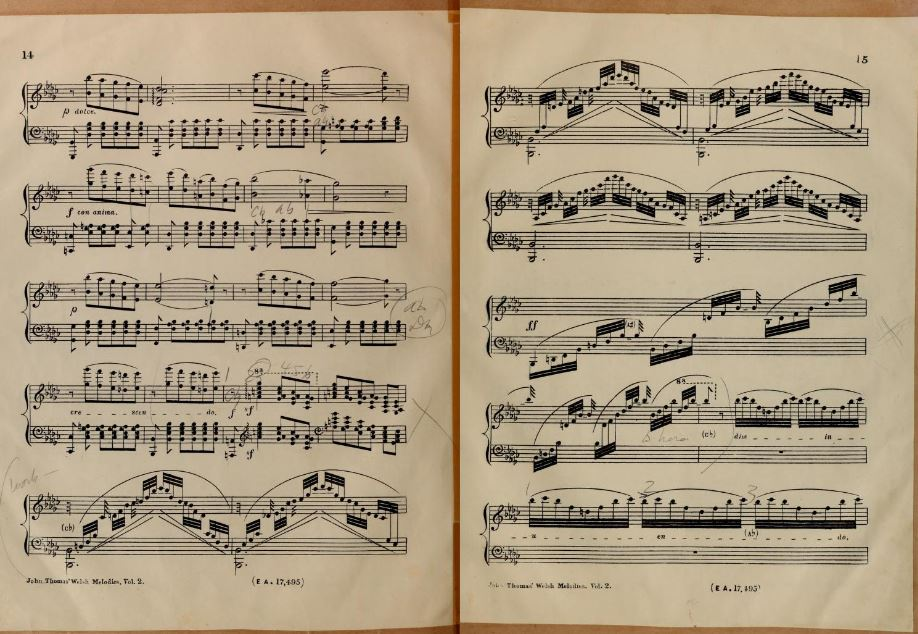
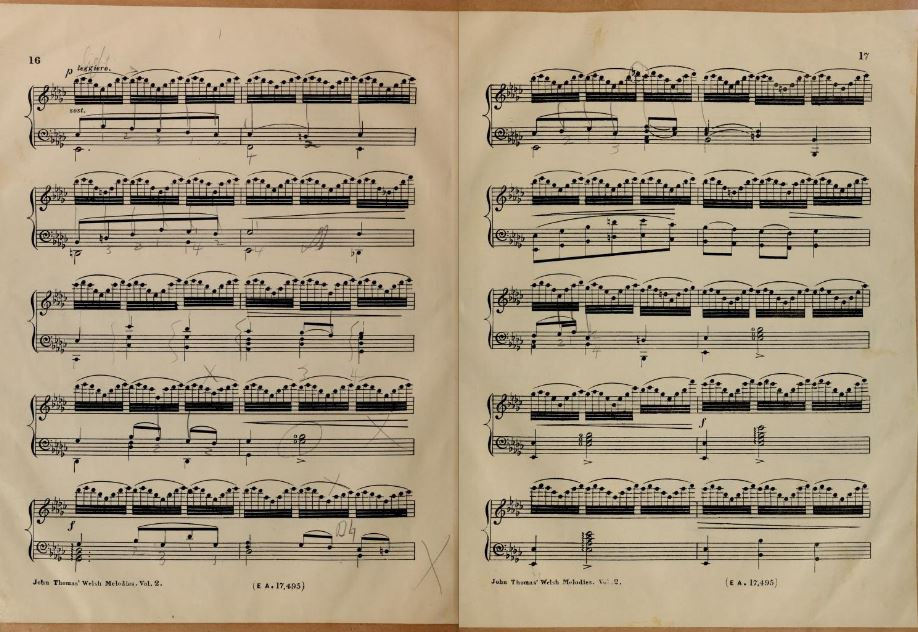
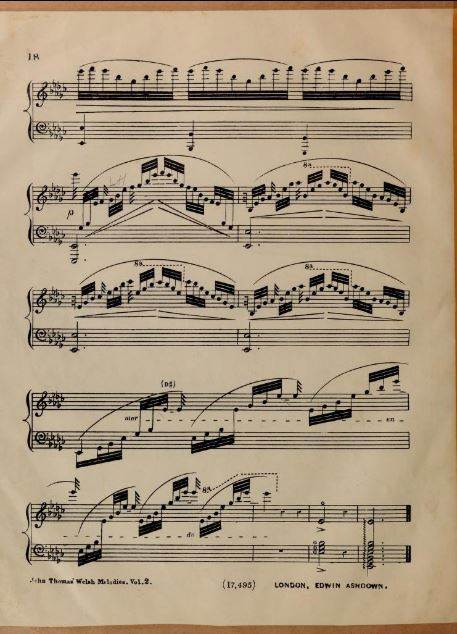
Musical score in Welsh Melodies for the Harp by John Thomas (1890)

== Arrangements ==
- Benjamin Britten
- Edward German: Welsh Rhapsody, III. David of the White Rock
- Haydn "The Dying bard to his harp" Hob. XXXIb:4
- Morfydd Llwyn Owen
- Thalberg: L'Art du chant appliqué au piano, Op. 70 no. 22
- John Thomas
