= Louisa M. Spooner =

Welsh novelist

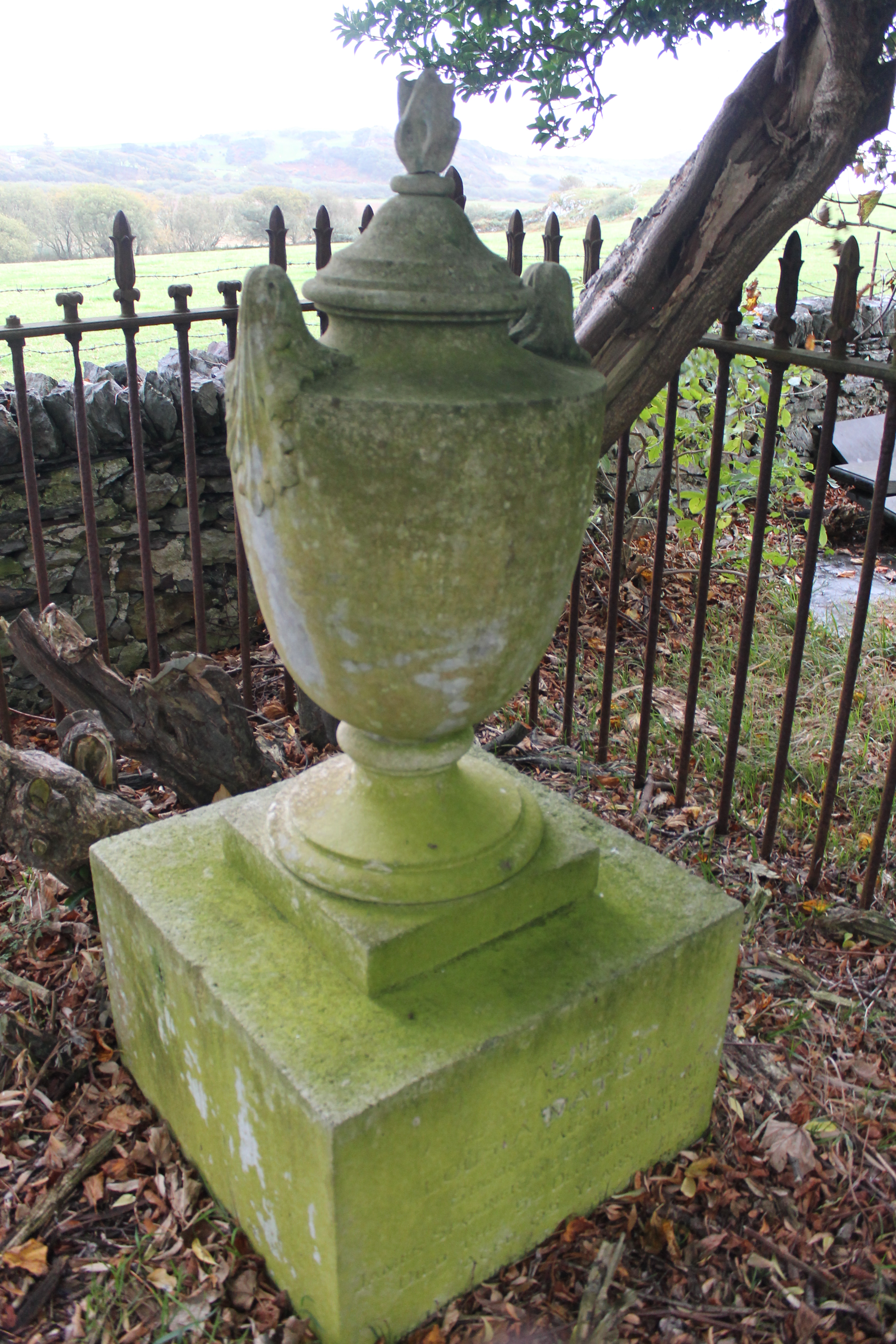
Louisa Matilda Spooner's grave at St Cynhaearn's Church, Ynyscynhaearn. She is buried in the same grave as her parents.

Louisa Matilda Spooner, pseudonym L. M. S. (1820 – 5 December 1886), was a Welsh novelist.

== Life ==
She was born in Maentwrog and baptised on 24 March 1820, as the fifth of eventually ten children of her English parents James Spooner (1790–1856) and his first wife, Elizabeth (née Easton; 1787–1850). James was a surveyor and engineer and was hired by the Welsh entrepreneur William Madocks (1773–1826) to assist him with his grand land and town development plans.

Her older brother Charles Easton Spooner (1818–1889) was the first of her siblings to be born in Wales. By the time the sixth Spooner child, Amelia (1824–1922), arrived, lodgings in Maentwrog became inevitably cramped and the family moved to Plas Tan yr Allt, William Madocks’ spacious former home in Tremadog.

Louisa never married and always stayed close to her family throughout her adult life. After her mother’s death in 1850, her father re-married in the same year, taking Eliza James for his wife. By 1860, Louisa had moved in with her older brother, Charles, and his four children at Bron-y-Garth, Porthmadog, following the death of his wife, Mary. Apart from managing the household and helping him raise his children, little is known of Louisa outside her living arrangements with her brother and her writing activities.

She died in Porthmadog on 5 December 1886 and was buried in the same grave as her parents in the churchyard of St Cynhaearn’s, Ynyscynhaearn. Curiously, her name on the gravestone is misspelled as 'Lousia' (see image). Following her death, Charles financed the installation of a stained-glass window to her memory in St John’s Church, Porthmadog, which is still in place today.

== Works ==
Her works include:

- Gladys of Harlech (1858)
- Country Landlords (1860)
- The Welsh Heiress: A Novel (1868)

In her novels, she focused largely on topics relating to Wales and from a Welsh perspective. In Gladys of Harlech, Spooner used the backdrop of the Wars of the Roses to discuss Welshness in its relation to the English crown. In Country Landlords, she discussed landownership and republicanism in the nineteenth century, while The Welsh Heiress engages with the impact of alcoholism on farming communities. All of her novels are set vaguely in Merionethshire, the area where she spent the majority of her life.

Country Landlords prominently features a Black servant, Yarico. The name originates in historic accounts of an enslaved native woman from the West Indies and its subsequent use in abolitionist literature.

Towards the end of her life, she published a serialised short story, ‘Amos Dura: or “The Faithful Friend”’, in the conservative, religious magazine Golden Hours (1884).
