= Baner y Groes =

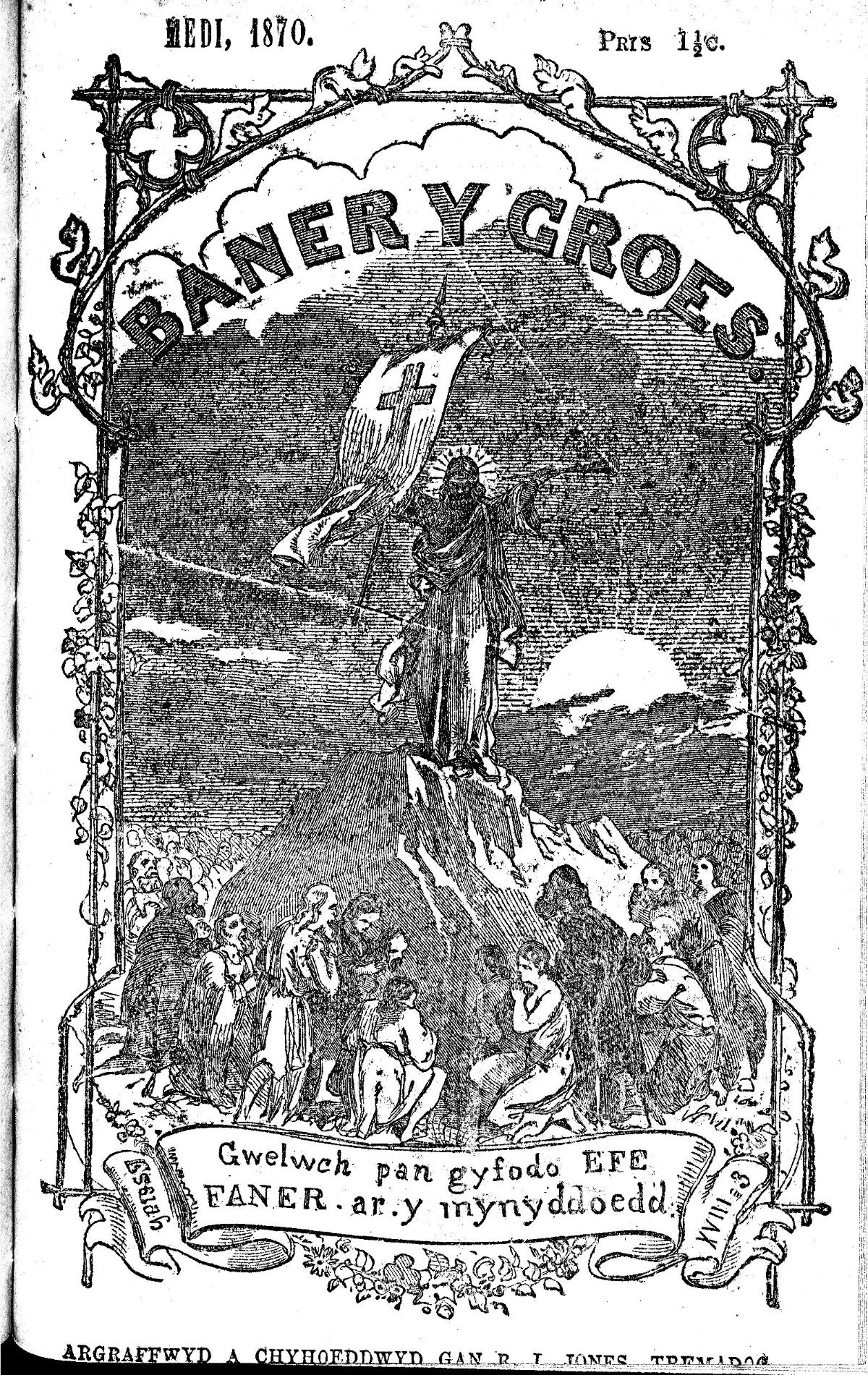
Baner y Groes (Welsh Journal)

Baner y Groes was a monthly 19th century Welsh language periodical, first published by Hughes and Butler, in London, in 1827. It was aimed at the children and young people of the established church. Its first editor was John Williams (Ab Ithel) (1811–1862), who had been educated at Jesus College, Oxford. It ceased production for a time before being resurrected in 1870 by the pharmacist, author and printer, Robert Isaac Jones (Alltud Eifion, 1815–1905).
