= David Owen (harpist) =

- Born: January 1712
- Died: August 1741 (aged 28–29)
- Instrument: Harp

David Owen (January 1712 – August 1741) was a Welsh harpist, best remembered as the composer of the popular song, "Dafydd y Garreg Wen" ("David of the White Rock"), which according to tradition Owen composed as he was dying. Dafydd y Garreg Wen was later adapted and published by harpist Edward Jones.

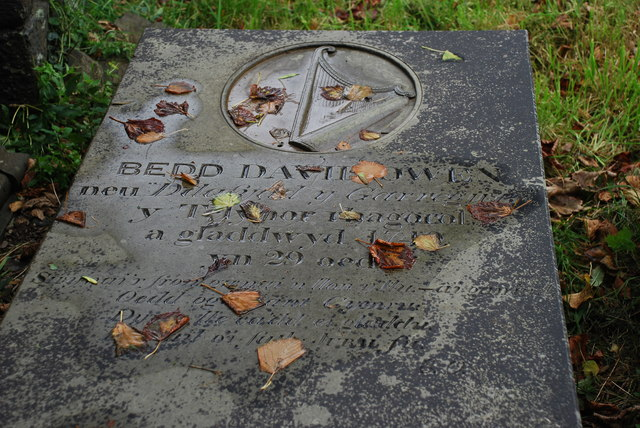
Grave of David Owen at Ynyscynhaearn

David Owen was the son of Owen Humphreys of Ynyscynhaearn in Caernarfonshire (the surname "Owen" being a patronymic). His mother's maiden name was Gwen Roberts. He composed several well-known airs. He was buried in the churchyard of St Cynhaiarn's Church in his home village of Ynyscynhaearn.

== Musical works ==
- "Dafydd y Garreg Wen"
- "Codiad yr Ehedydd" ("The rising of the lark")
- "Difyrrwch gwŷr Criccieth" ("The delight of the men of Criccieth")
