= Ystumllyn =

16th-century house in Criccieth, Wales

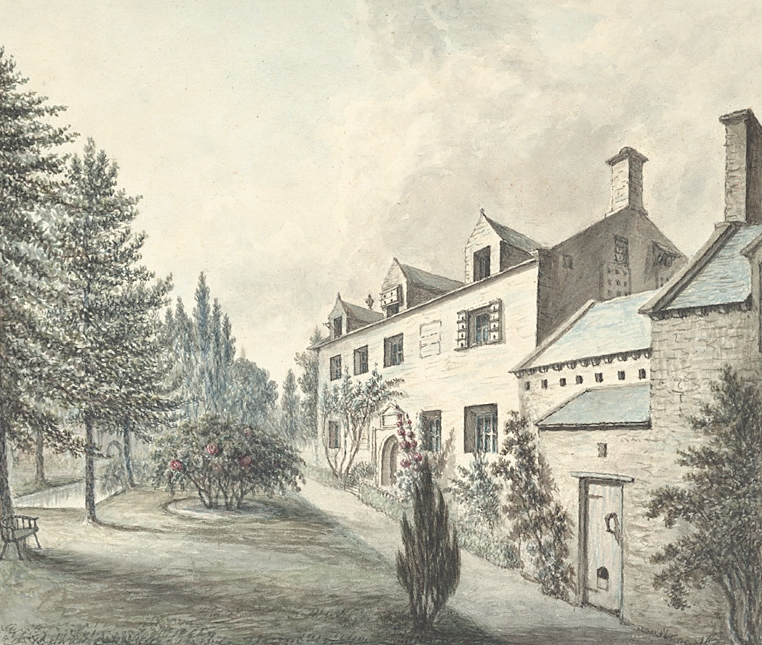
- Ystumllyn in 1794 by John Ingleby

- Location within Gwynedd Location within the United Kingdom
- 52°55′33.53″N 4°12′18.53″W
- Location: Criccieth, Gwynedd, Wales

History
- Built: late-16th-century

Site notes
- Architectural style: Vernacular

Listed Building – Grade II*
- Designated: 12 December 1994
- Reference no.: 4291

Ystumllyn is a Grade II* listed house in Criccieth, Wales. Founded in the late-16th-century, and significantly expanded in the early-18th-century, it is remarkable as an "important example" of the vernacular architecture of both periods.

== History ==
The house was apparently built at the end of the 16th century by Ellis ap Cadwaladr (d. 1597), a member of the Welsh Ellis family, which claimed to trace its lineage back to Gollwyn ap Tangno, founder of one of the Fifteen Tribes of Wales. Ellis obtained the property from the Crown, and is the first member of the family to be described as "of Ystumllyn". When it was first built, the house was likely one of the earliest storied buildings in the region. Before 20th-century renovations, the house bore two dated inscriptions of 1720 and 1729 giving a likely date for the extensive 18th-century remodeling and extensions. The owner in this period was Rev. Humphrey Wynn (d. 1724), whose initials are featured on the earlier of these inscriptions. By 1725, it was in possession of Ellis Wynn (d. 1759) who held in until his death. In 1824, the estate passed to philologist Rowland Jones. The roof was raised and the fenestration was remodeled in the 19th century. In c. 1946, J. Egbert Griffiths of Porthmadog carried out several minor alterations, adding some extra windows and rearranging the internal room structure. On 12 December 1994, the building was designated a Grade II* listed building, a listing reserved for "particularly important buildings of more than special interest".

The house was home to several local notables throughout its history. The Welsh poet Gruffydd Phylip (d. 1666) composed several poems addressed to the Ellis family, including a poem directly referencing the house, "Hiraeth y bardd am Ystumllyn" ("The Bard's Longing for Ystumllyn"). John Ystumllyn (d. 1786), who took his name from the household, was employed by the Wynn family at this estate as a gardener and survived as the first well-recorded black person of North Wales. He was of uncertain origins, and was possibly kidnapped from Africa by the Wynn family, but lived out a happy life in Ystumllyn, eventually running away with and marrying a local woman.

== Architecture ==
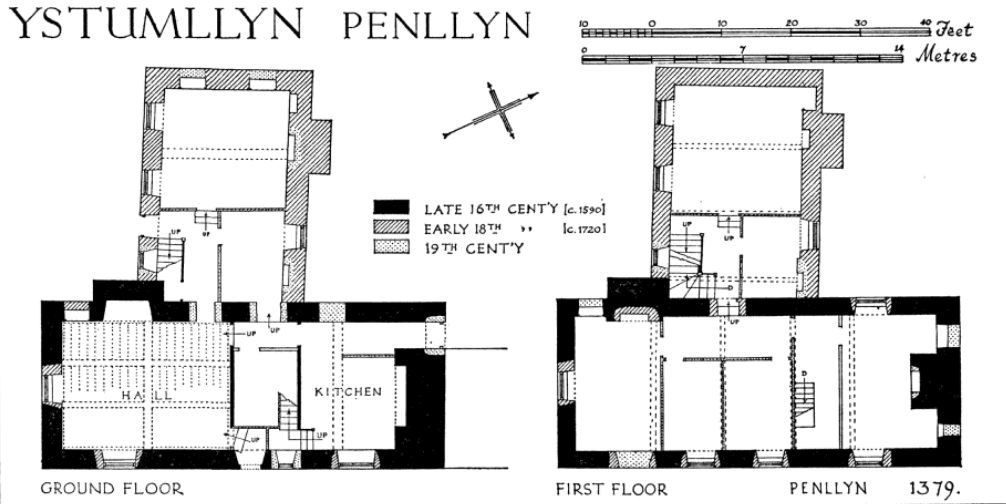
Chronological plan of Ystumllyn.

Ystumllyn is a rubble-built house of two stories, composed of two blocks arranged into a T-shaped plan. The east-facing block is the earliest part of the building, dating to the late 16th century, while the north-facing block (which bisects the east block) was constructed in the early 18th century. The building has been described as historically remarkable in the British Listed Buildings' rationale for registering it as a Grade II* listed building; its original component "incorporates an important example" of 16th-century architecture, while its 18th-century additions "represent high quality vernacular work of the period".

== Gallery ==
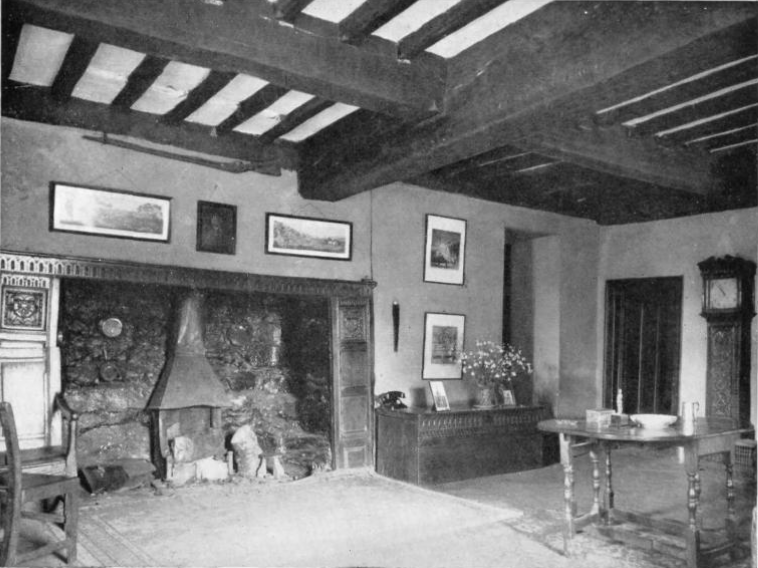
Large hall in the south of the original block, 16th-century.

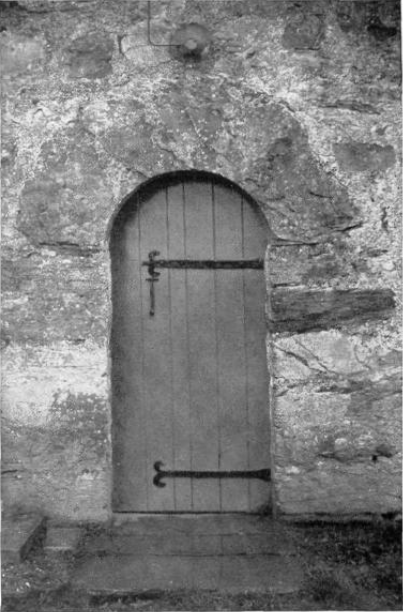
Original doorway in the east side of the original block, 16th-century.

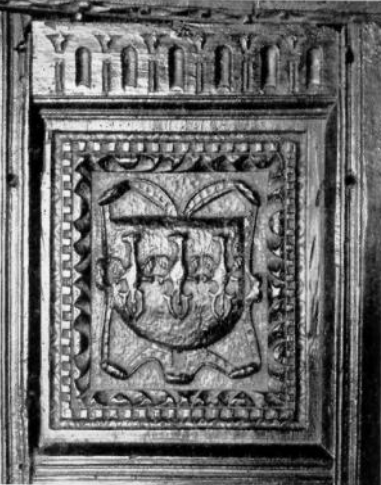
Panel in hall, left of fireplace, depicts the arms of Owain Gwynedd (1100–1170), king of Gwynedd.

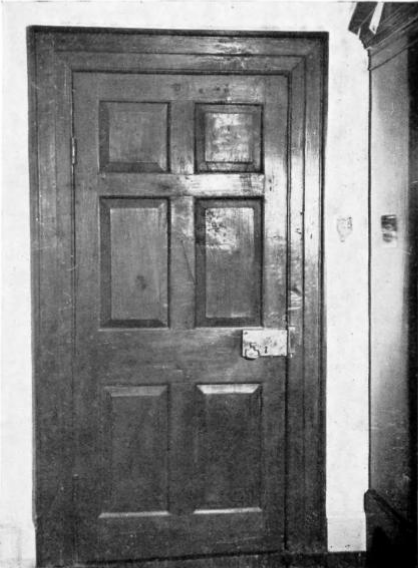
North bedroom door, 18th-century. One of the few remaining unmodernised parts of the north wing.

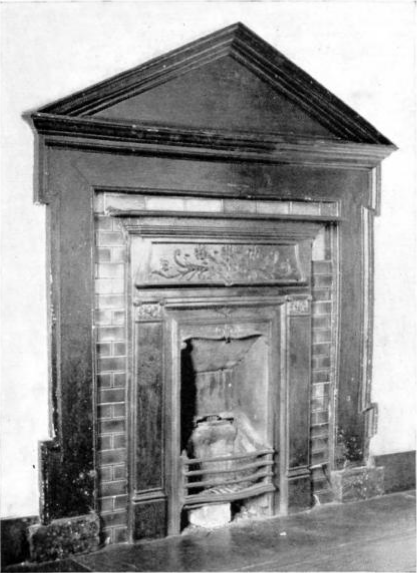
Fireplace in south bedroom, 18th-century.

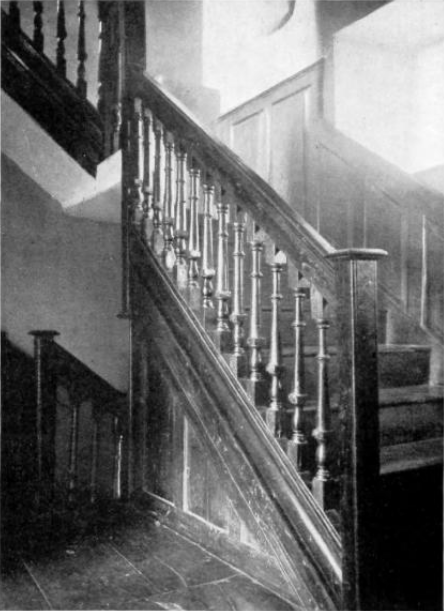
Staircase, reassembled during 18th-century renovations.

== Sources ==
- "Ystumllyn: A Grade II* Listed Building in Criccieth (Cricieth), Gwynedd". British Listed Buildings.
- Davies, William Llewelyn (1959). "ELLIS family, of Bron y Foel and Ystumllyn, Ynyscynhaearn, Caernarfonshire". Dictionary of Welsh Biography.
- Green, Andrew (10 October 2019). "Ystumllyn, John (d. 1786)". Oxford Dictionary of National Biography (online ed.). Oxford University Press. (Subscription, Wikipedia Library access or UK public library membership required.)
- Royal Commission on the Ancient and Historical Monuments of Wales (1964a). An Inventory of the Ancient Monuments in Caernarvonshire: II Central: the Cantref of Arfon and the Commote of Eifionydd. London: Her Majesty's Stationery Office.
- Royal Commission on the Ancient and Historical Monuments of Wales (1964b). An Inventory of the Ancient Monuments in Caernarvonshire: III West: the Cantref of Lleyn together with the General Survey. London: Her Majesty's Stationery Office.
