= The Spooners of Porthmadog =

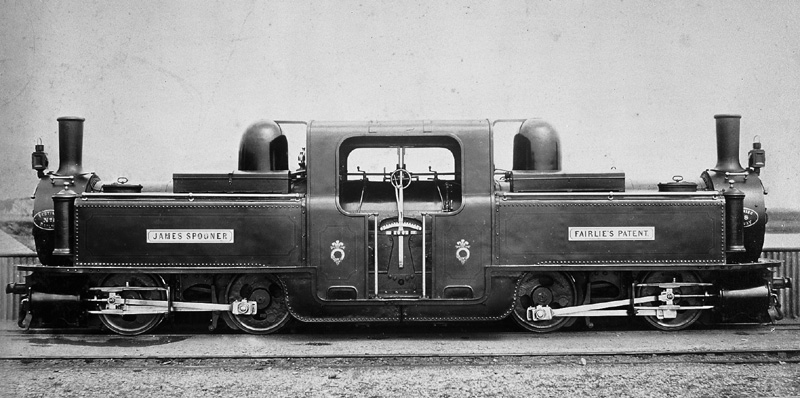
Fairlie locomotive James Spooner, 1887

The Spooners of Porthmadog were a family from Porthmadog, North Wales who made important contributions to the development of narrow gauge railways both locally and throughout the world. James Spooner, together with his sons James Swinton and Charles Easton and other members of their family, constructed and managed the Ffestiniog Railway for over fifty years. In North Wales they were involved in the promotion of numerous railway schemes including many quarry lines, the Talyllyn Railway, the Festiniog and Blaenau Railway, the North Wales Narrow Gauge Railways and the Carnarvonshire Railway. Through publications and overseas family commissions they influenced narrow gauge railway construction in Russia, America and throughout the British Empire.

== James Spooner ==
=== Family ===
James Spooner (1790–1856) was born at Leigh near Worcester in 1790. He trained as a land surveyor and is believed to have worked as a civilian member of an Ordnance Survey team. He married in 1813 and his first three children were Matthew, James Swinton, and Caroline. From 1818 to 1824, they lived at Maentwrog where Charles Easton, Louisa Matilda, Thomas and Amelia were born. When the North Wales survey was completed in 1823, Spooner, with his growing family, stayed and worked as a freelance surveyor. In 1825, Spooner took a lease of William Madocks' house Tan yr Allt Isaf at Tremadog where Elizabeth and Harriet were born and Caroline was accidentally shot dead by Matthew. Finally, the family moved to Morfa Lodge in Porthmadog where William was born in 1834.

=== Ffestiniog Railway survey ===
Spooner was already well established as a local surveyor and he had surveyed inclines and a tramway (never to be built) from the Moelwyns to Porthmadog via the Croesor valley, when, in 1830, Henry Archer commissioned him to survey a suitable route for the Ffestiniog Railway. James Swinton and Charles Easton both assisted their father in this work. Spooner also had an experienced assistant in Thomas Prichard who had worked for Stephenson.

=== Robert Stephenson ===
After the survey was completed, Robert Stephenson walked the route with Archer, Spooner and his sons and Prichard. Stephenson gave his approval to their plans. There has been discussion of which Robert Stephenson this was. George Stephenson's younger brother Robert surveyed the route of the Nantlle Railway in 1825 and it has generally been thought that he was the inspector of the Ffestiniog route. However, it is now accepted that it was George's son Robert who advised the promoters of the Festiniog Railway, based on Stephenson's evidence to the Parliamentary Committee in 1832.

=== Gravity working ===
Spooner introduced 'dandy wagons' on the Ffestiniog, which were originally developed in the Northumberland coalfields. These allowed the horses to ride back downhill after they had hauled trains of empty wagons from Porthmadog to the slate quarries. The dandy wagon was attached to the rear of a train of loaded slate wagons. The train then proceeded downhill powered by gravity. The railway had been engineered with a continuous grade of about 1 in 80 to allow for gravity operation.

== Charles Easton Spooner ==
=== Work for Ffestiniog Railway ===
As a boy, with his eldest brother James, Charles (1818–1889) had assisted his father in laying out the Ffestiniog Railway and subsequently during construction. He appears to have remained in Porthmadog and been involved with the railway under his father who was Clerk to the company. Charles became Treasurer of the company in 1848 and following his father's death in 1856 was appointed Manager and Clerk. He held the position for thirty years and dominated Ffestiniog Railway management and engineering until his own health began to fail in 1887. Under Charles the blacksmiths' forge at Boston Lodge was developed into comprehensive railway manufacturing and repair workshops.

=== Capacity problem ===
Spooner was faced with the seemingly intractable problem of a railway working to maximum capacity yet unable to cope with the volume of traffic on offer. He was also aware that others were seeking alternative routes for the transport of Blaenau Ffestiniog's growing slate traffic. Spooner investigated the option of conversion to double track but the added capacity could not have paid for the construction costs involved.

=== Steam power ===
Steam locomotives, never before tried on a narrow gauge line and declared by all the leading designers to be unworkable on so narrow a gauge, were inevitable. But they would not have been possible when the line was built in 1836 and could only be introduced 27 years later when locomotive development had advanced and after the line had been relaid with heavier steel rails.

=== George England locomotives ===
Charles Easton Spooner engaged Charles Holland to design the first six small engines built by George England and Co. for the Ffestiniog. The first four engines delivered in 1863 required significant modification by the Spooners in the light of experience. Two of the original four locomotives are still in regular operation. Later engines were delivered on the newly opened Cambrian Railways to Minffordd where Spooner had laid out a pattern of exchange sidings that inspired many visitors from abroad to adopt narrow gauge as the inexpensive feeder line to the standard gauge.

=== Fairlie locomotives ===
It was through George England that Spooner commissioned Robert Francis Fairlie to design and build 'Little Wonder' an articulated locomotive ideally suited to a relatively short, heavily curved and steeply graded narrow gauge line. Spooner and Fairlie brought the world to Porthmadog in February 1870 for a remarkable series of locomotive trials at which Russian observers were very prominent as were observers from the Denver and Rio Grande Railroad. These trials and the writings of Spooner and Fairlie influenced the promotion of narrow gauge railways throughout the world. Concerning C. E. Spooner, on 27 December 1872 "Engineering" wrote "He shows an earnestness and enthusiasm, we may almost say an absolute devotion for the Festiniog Railway".

== Spooner and Company ==
=== James Swinton Spooner ===
James Swinton (1816–1884), an elder brother of Charles Easton, was the engineer to the Talyllyn Railway built in 1865.

=== George Percival Spooner ===
George Percival (1850–1917; son of Charles Easton and a graduate of Karlsruhe Polytechnic) remained with the family firm (often catalogued as Spooner & Co., Portmadoc, England) and designed locomotives for the Ffestiniog Railway and other railways. The Ffestiniog Carriages Nos. 15 & 16 were built in 1872 to his design by Brown, Marshalls and Co. Ltd., Birmingham. These were the first bogie passenger carriages of any gauge to run in the United Kingdom. These historic iron-framed carriages, the forerunners of all the carriages now running on British Railways, are still in use, and were fully restored in 2001 with the aid of a grant from the Heritage Lottery Fund. In 1879, Spooner was exiled to India (owing to the pregnancy of Eleanor Davies, one of the servants) where he became Locomotive Superintendent of the Indian State Railways. He eventually returned to England, becoming a Special Constable at Kings Cross, London during World War I. He died in 1917.

=== Charles Edwin Spooner ===
Charles Edwin Spooner (1853–1909), youngest son of Charles Easton, was resident engineer of the North Wales Narrow Gauge Railways from 1874 to 1876 during its construction. Afterwards he had a distinguished railway career in Malaya.

== Postscripts ==
=== Garden railway ===
Charles Easton Spooner was a Victorian 'family man' and he established his family at Bron y Garth where in 1869 he built a garden railway for the entertainment of family and friends. Such a feature was an undoubted novelty at that time. The brass trackwork and the engine and rolling stock were all made in the FR works at Boston Lodge (where the surviving track is now stored). 'Topsy', the famous 3¼ inch gauge model of an England engine was built at Boston Lodge by W. Williams, Works Engineer and it was thought to have been lost. However it was discovered and brought to Porthmadog Harbour Station in 1963 and it is now on display. This is the earliest known model of the first narrow gauge locomotive in the world.

=== Spooner Family Grave ===
In 1998, the Ffestiniog and the Welsh Highland Railway Heritage Groups together undertook the restoration of the Spooner Family Grave in Beddgelert Churchyard. This consists of a large double plot with two carved slate memorial tops surrounded by iron railings, which had been specially made in the Ffestiniog Railway Boston Lodge works. One stone commemorates Charles Easton Spooner and his eldest son John Eryri, the other his wife Mary, with their infant son James and also their daughter Mary who died aged five allegedly of bubonic plague but more probably of typhoid. A separate grave alongside the first is that of the nurse Elizabeth Preece who cared for Mary and who herself died of the same disease two days later. The restoration work, which involved heavy weed clearance, the cleaning of the stones, and the rust proofing and painting the railings, caught the attention of Cadw, resulting in the graves now being listed as grade 2 monuments.
