= Ellis Owen =

Welsh antiquarian

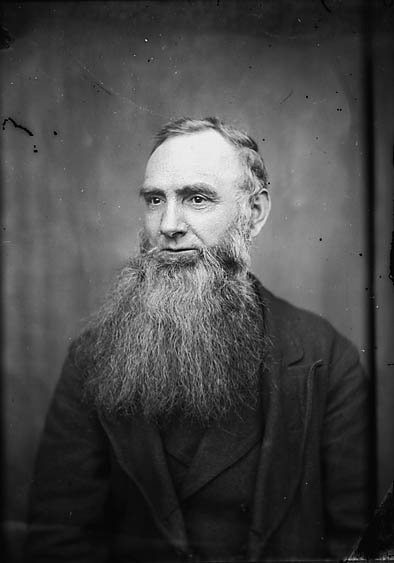
- Born: 31 March 1789
- Died: January 27, 1868 (aged 78)
- Occupation: Antiquarian

Ellis Owen (31 March 1789 – 27 January 1868) was a Welsh antiquarian and poet.

== Biography ==
Owen was the son of Owen Ellis and Ann Thomas his wife, of Cefnymeusydd, in the parish of Ynys Cynhaiarn, Carnarvonshire, was born on 31 March 1789. He went to school at Penmorfa, and was afterwards sent to Shrewsbury; on returning home he settled at Cefynmeusydd, and on his father's death took charge of the farm. He spent the rest of his life at Cefnymeusydd as a prosperous farmer of much local influence, and died there on 27 January 1868. He was chiefly remarkable as a writer of ‘englynion’ (stanzas), as a local antiquary and genealogist, and as the friend and tutor of the young poets of the district. The ‘Literary Society of Cefnymeusydd,’ the precursor of many a society of the kind in Wales, met fortnightly at his house and under his presidency for eleven years (1846–57). His poetical and prose writings were published, with a biographical notice, under the title of ‘Cell Meudwy’ (‘The Hermit's Cell’) in 1877 (Tremadog). Four days before his death he had been elected a fellow of the Society of Antiquaries.
