= Tonio (app) =

Austrian audio decoding app

information.io GmbH
- Company type: Privately held company
- Founded: 2014; 12 years ago Austria
- Headquarters: Vienna, Austria
- Products: Apps
- Website: www.tonio.com

Tonio is an audio decoding app for mobile devices that allows you to send information inaudibly via radio or TV signals to smartphones. The app was developed by the Austrian company information.io GmbH and initially released in October 2014. Tonio has been awarded with the Austrian Radio Award and with the Austrian Media Future Award. The name Tonio is a neology from “Tone with Information”.

== Usage ==
Information which the app receives inaudibly via audio signals may include URLs, background information, tickets, coupons and music downloads. The developers have mentioned subtitles for operas as another possible use case. The Austrian marketer of advertisements in movie theaters, Cinecom, is offering the option to add background information to their commercials via the Tonio technology to its customers. The four largest chains of movie theaters in Austria removed their ban on cellphones in response to the new technology. Radio Eins, a public radio station in Berlin, sent URL links inaudibly via Tonio that were mentioned on air. The Austrian public broadcaster ORF is working on a cooperation with Tonio for various programs according to the Austrian business magazine trend as well as the station LoungeFM that intends to complement its radio news with links to the largest Austrian news website DerStandard.at. Tonio has been used for a campaign in movie theaters in April and May 2016, where visitors received trivia questions to the movie shown.

== Technology ==
Tonio decodes audio information that has been enriched with an inaudible code transmitted from a radio or TV station and translates the code into an URL for example. Therefore, a certain modification of the audio information by the broadcaster is required. In contrast, an acoustic fingerprint is a digital code to characterize sounds and audio recordings with specific acoustic characteristics (e.g. the app Shazam). Those fingerprints must be stored in databases to identify unknown sounds and acoustic signals (e.g. voice prints or songs), while Tonio codes and decodes additional information into the signal. Other apps with inaudible signals which were used for surveillance in the US by sending information about the user back to the server, have been flagged by the privacy protection organization Center for Democracy and Technology. However, according to its developers, Tonio decodes the information sent locally and not on the servers of the company, which makes tracking of consumer behaviour impossible.

== Awards ==
- Österreichischer Medienzukunftspreis 2015 (Austrian Media Future Award), category "Zukunftsweisende Medien-Unternehmen und ihr Medium" (Trendsetting media companies and their medium)
- Österreichischer Radiopreis (Austrian Radio Award) 2015, category "Best Innovation"
- Futurezone-Award 2015, "Best Infotainment Startup, 2nd Place
