= John Ingleby (painter) =

Welsh painter (1749–1808)

- Born: 1749; Halkyn, Flintshire, Wales
- Died: 1808 (aged 59); Halkyn, Flintshire, Wales
- Known for: painter
- Movement: Post-Impressionism

John Ingleby (1749–1808) was a Welsh topographical artist who produced miniature watercolours for the antiquarian Thomas Pennant (1726–1798). He was born in Halkyn, Flintshire, to Hugh Ingleby and Ann Davies, where he lived for most of his life. The Inglebys originally came from Derbyshire to Flintshire where they worked the lead mines at Halkyn; four years after John Ingleby's death, the family went bankrupt.

When he died in 1808 at his home village, church records indicate that he worked as a "limner" – a craftsmen who worked on a small scale, who was well established.

== Work ==
The collection of Ingleby watercolours established at the National Library of Wales are mostly views of North Wales. His best work involve little townscapes which are full of detail, and are valuable records of life at those towns and villages in the 18th – early 19th century. The colours are usually transparent, soft and even.

Selection of Ingleby paintings from the National Library

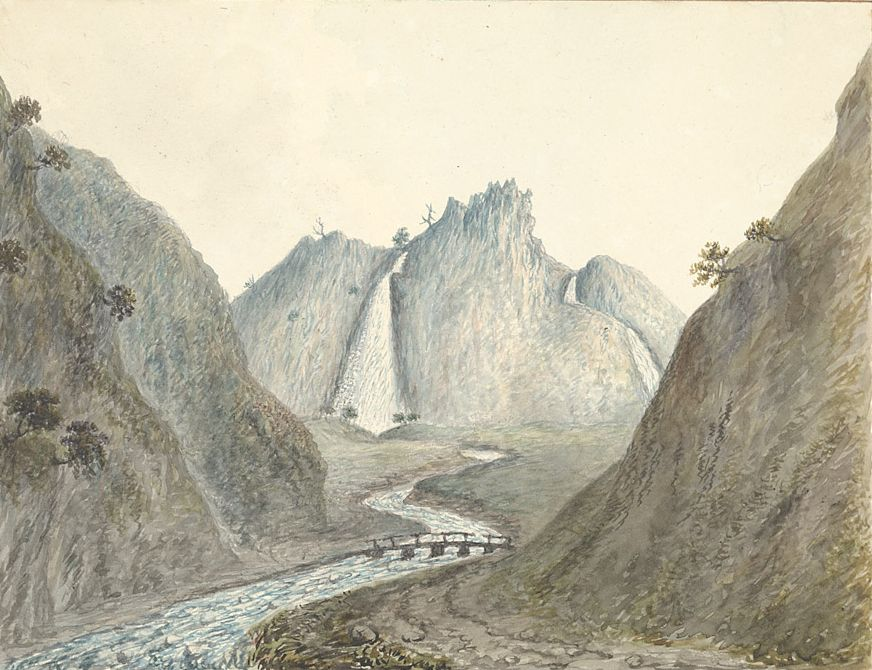
Aber Waterfall, 1796

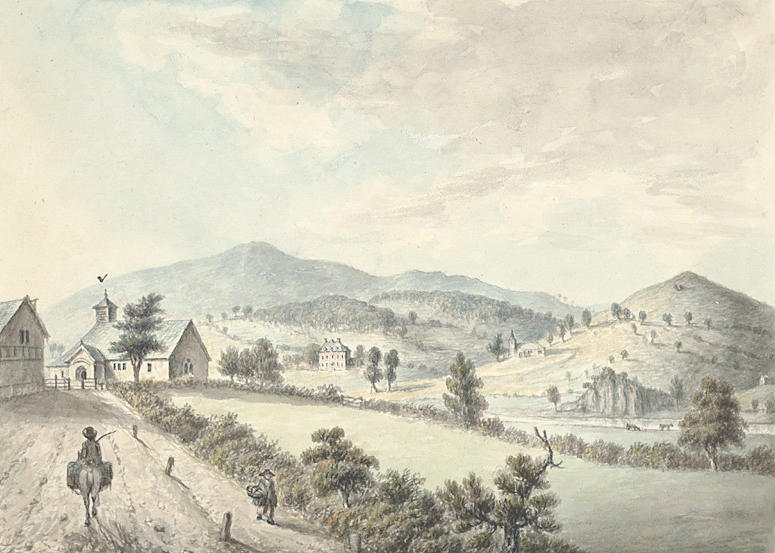
Abernavas church & hall, 1795

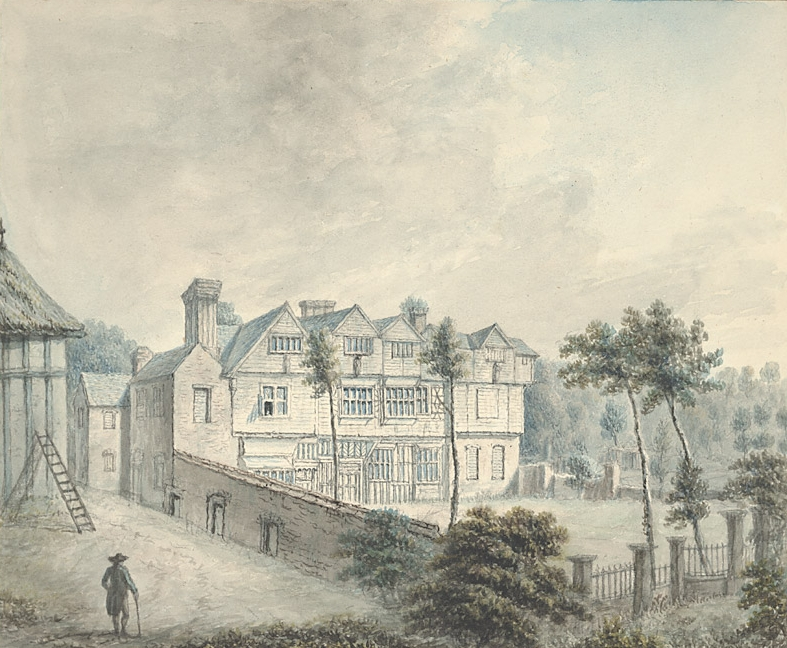
Abervechan front, 1796

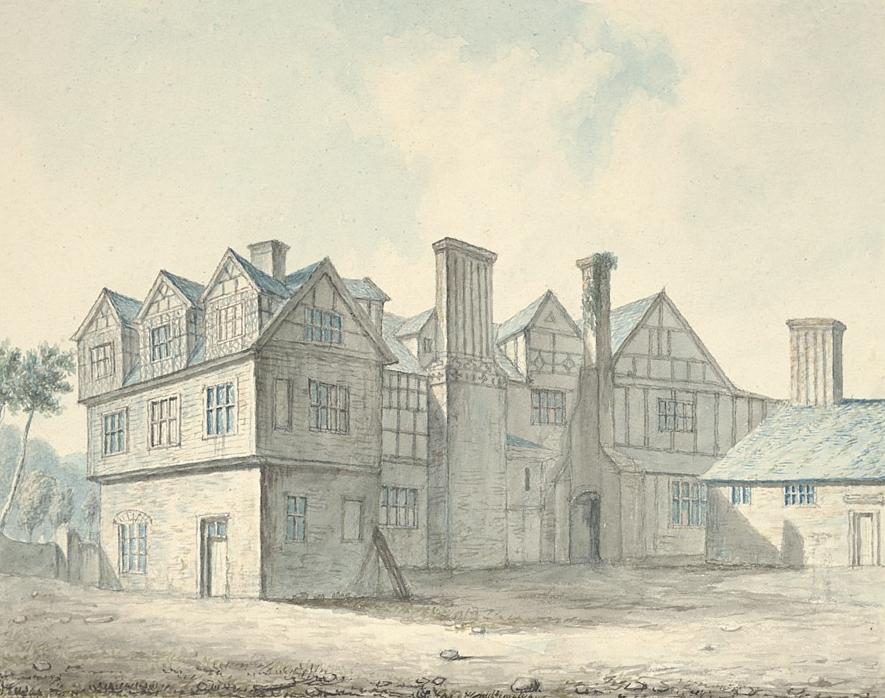
Abervechan rear, 1796

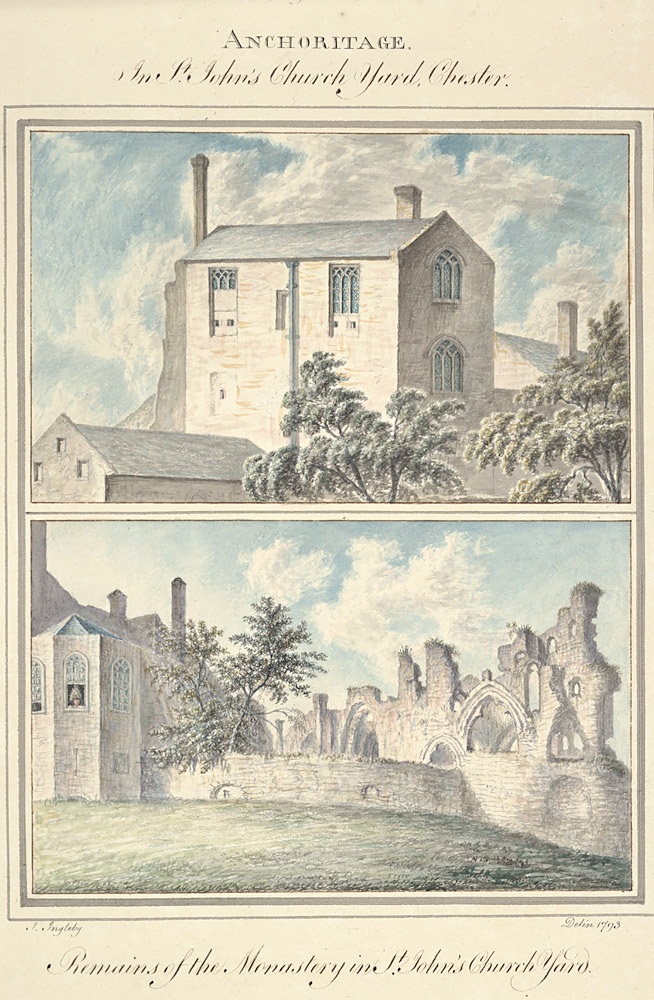
Anchoritage in St. John's Church yard, Chester, 1793

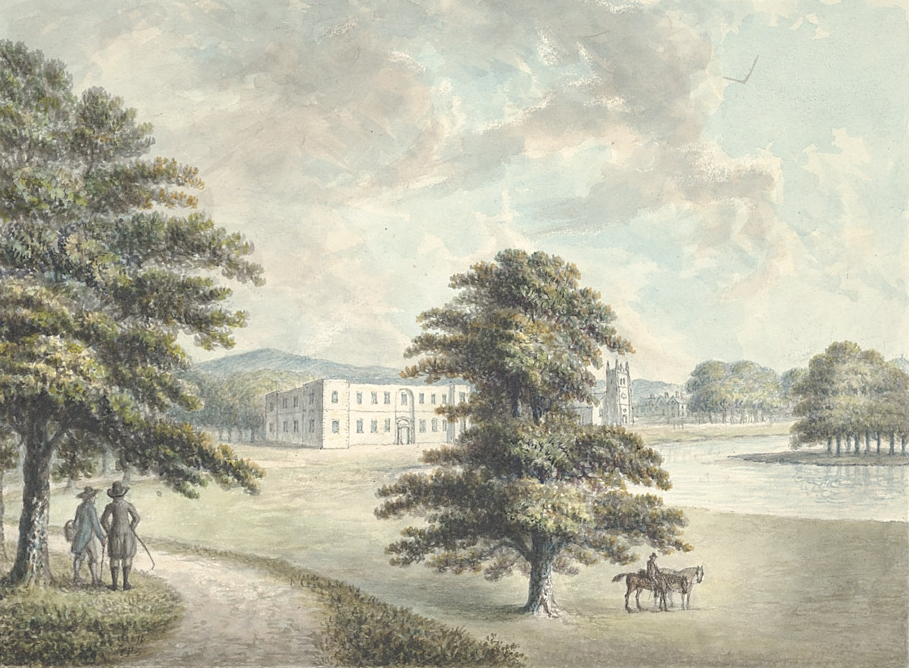
Aston, 1794

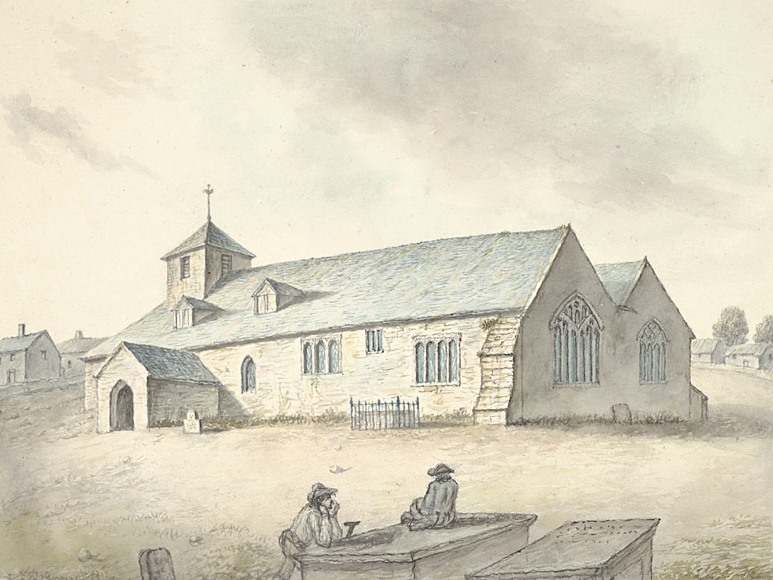
Berrew, 1796

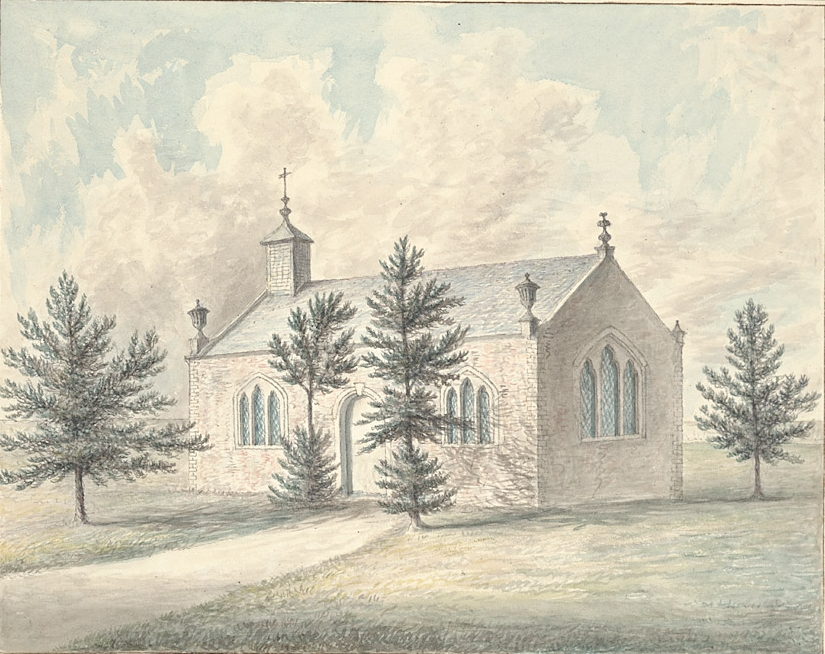
Berse Chapel, 1794

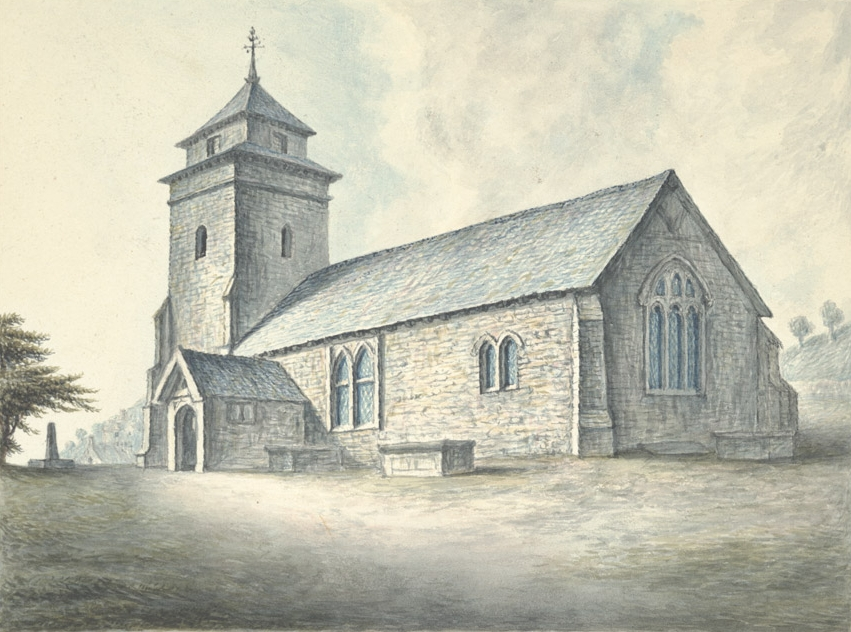
Bettws, 1794

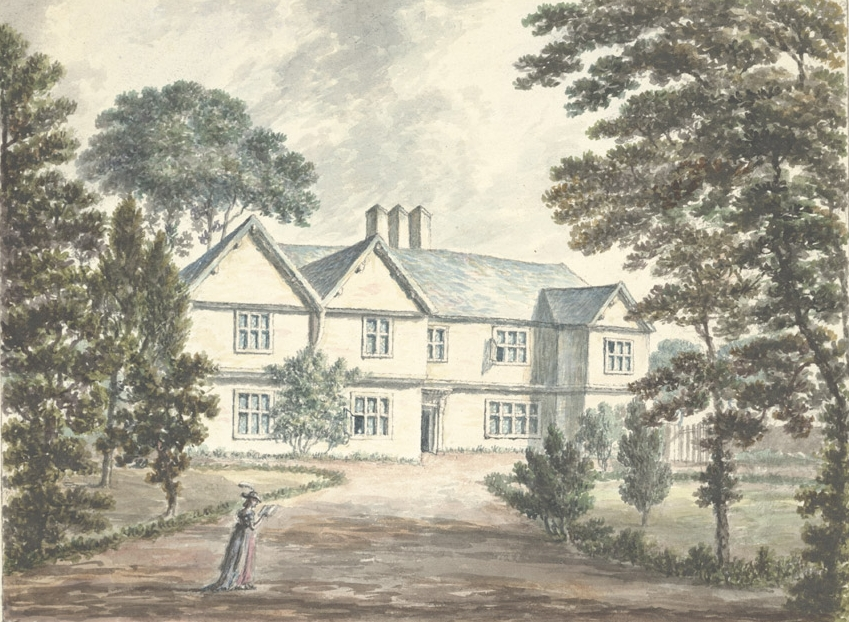
Birch, 1795

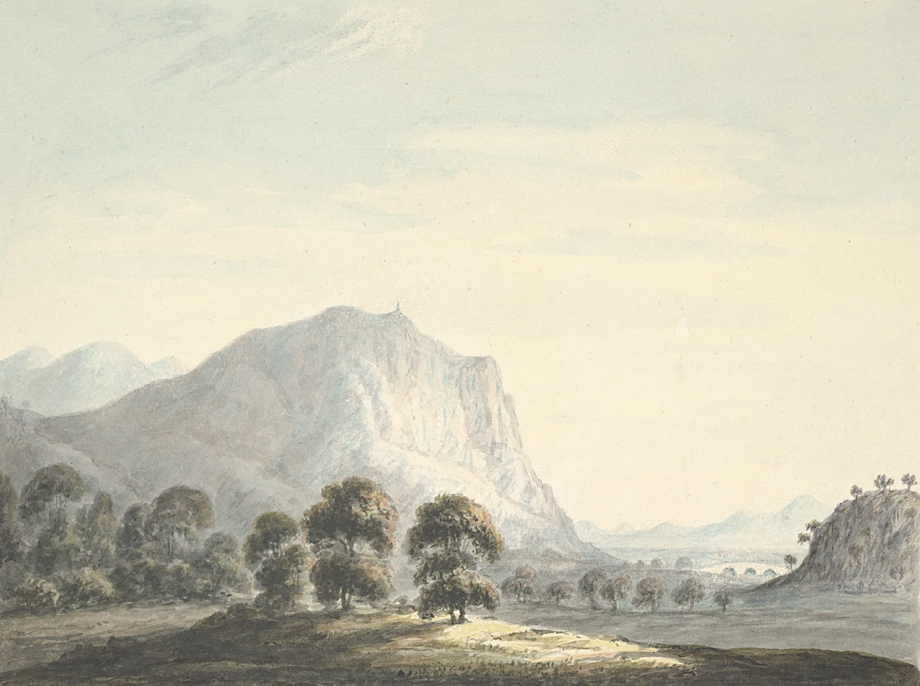
Breiddin Hills, Rodney's Pillar, 1794

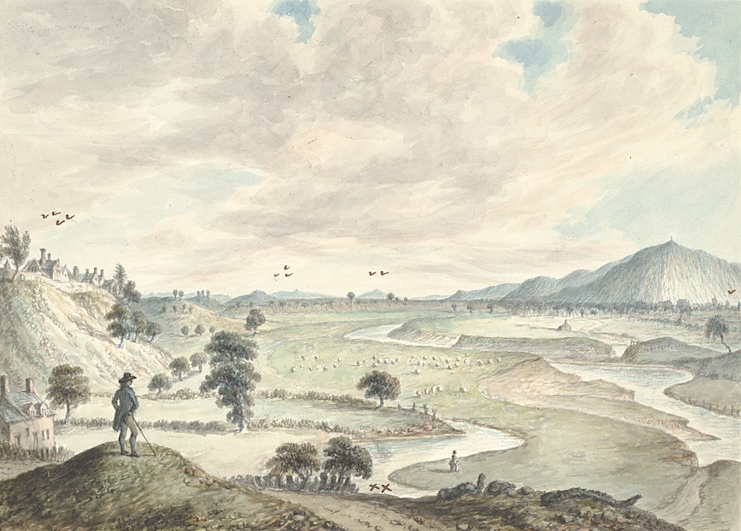
Breyden Hills from Llanymynech, 1795

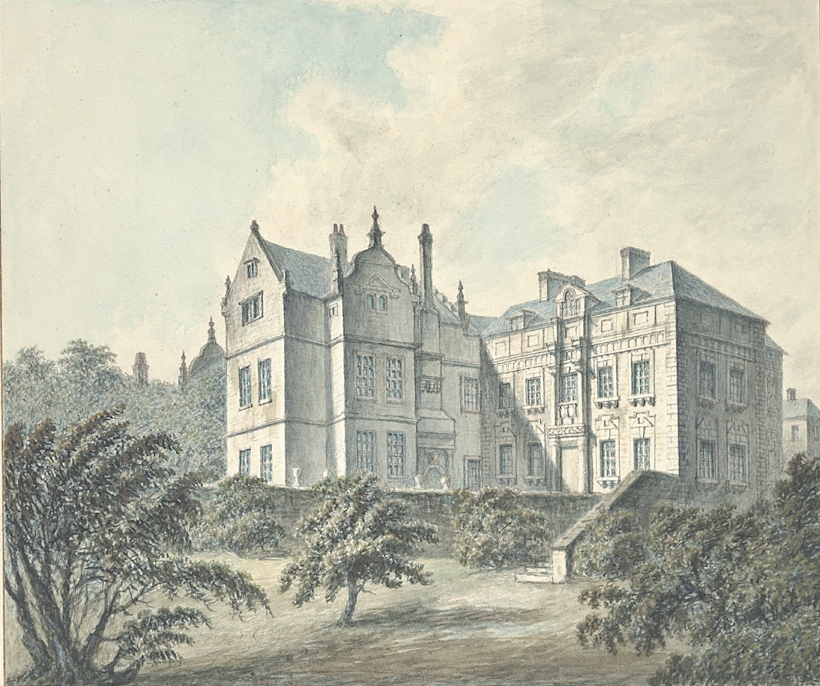
Brumbo House, 1794

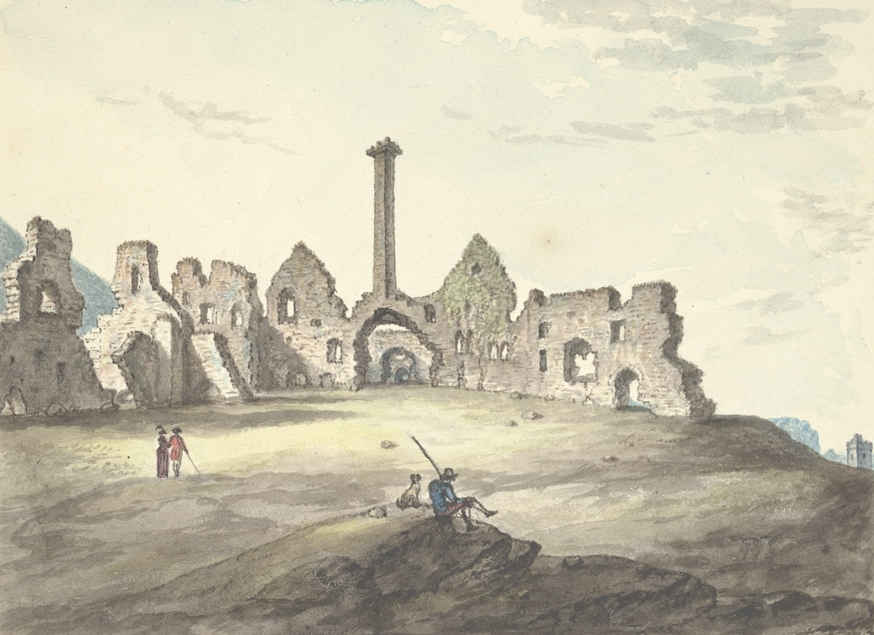
Bryn Euryn, 1795

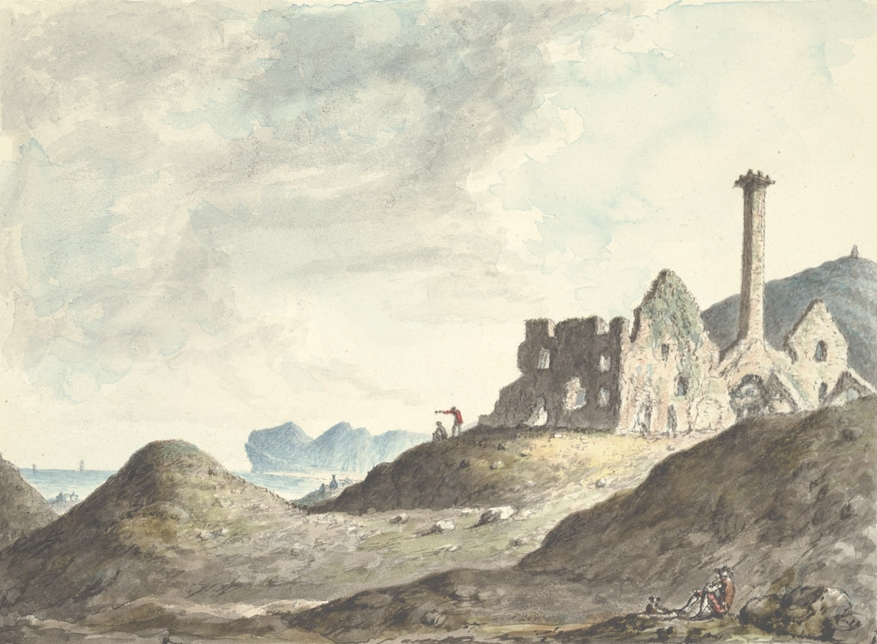
Bryn Euryn & Penmon Rhos, 1795

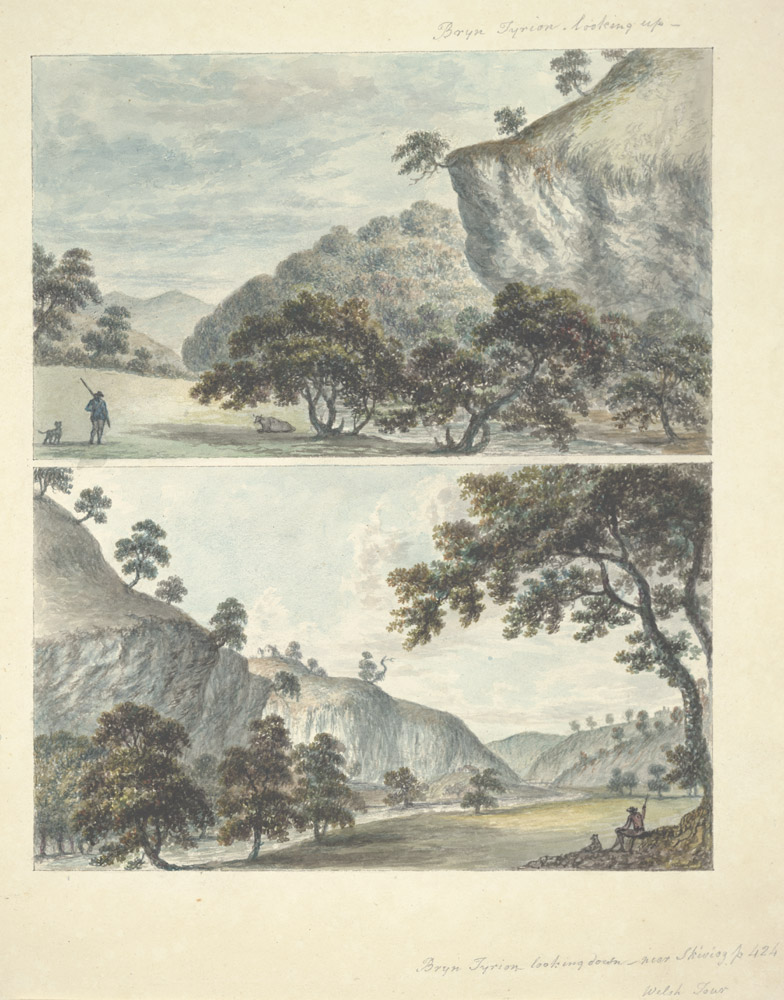
Bryn Tirion looking up & down, 1795

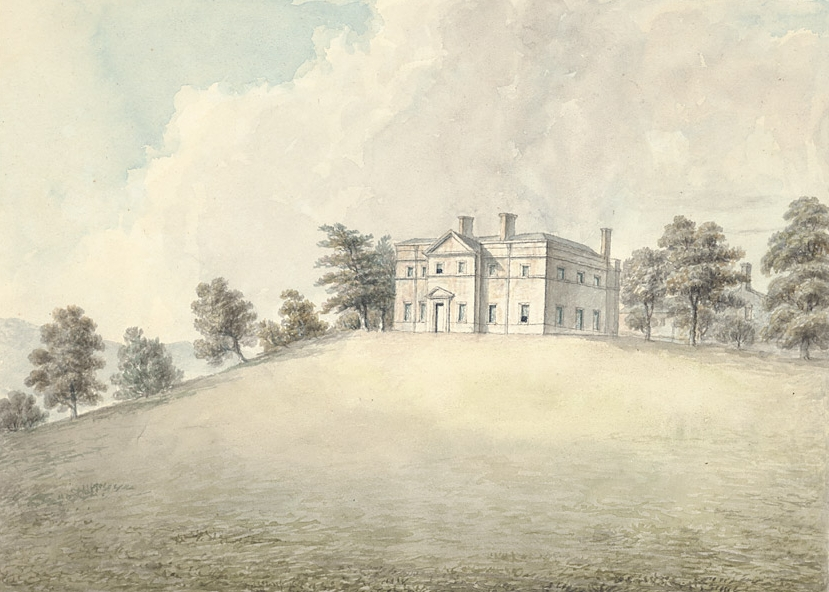
Bryn-Gwyn, 1795

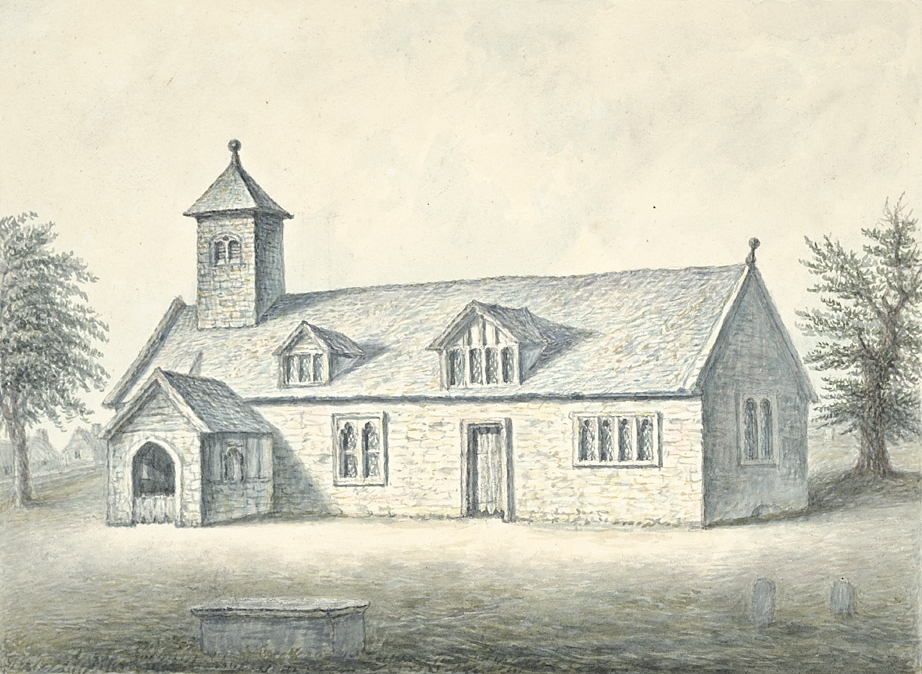
Castell Caerenion, 1794

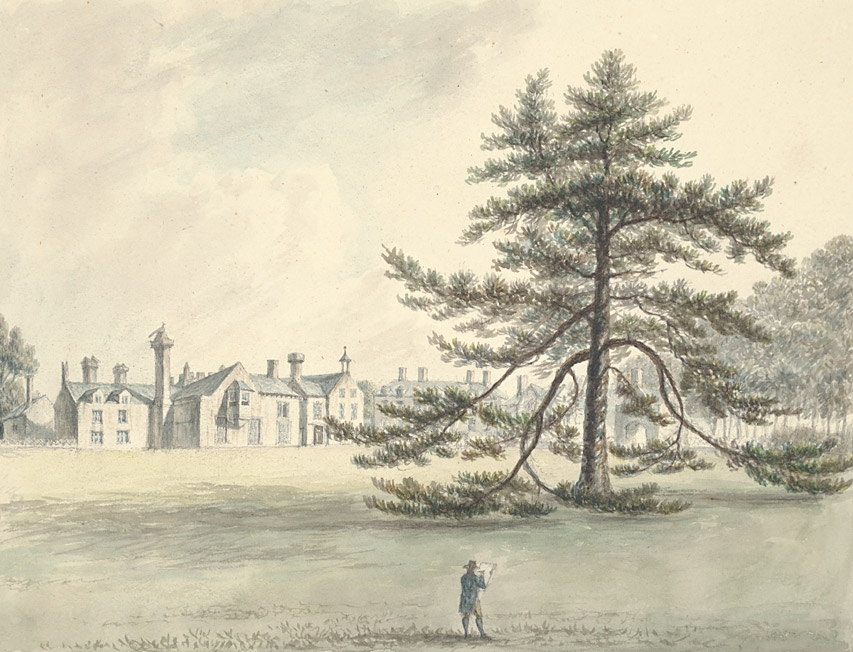
Cefn Amwlch, 1796

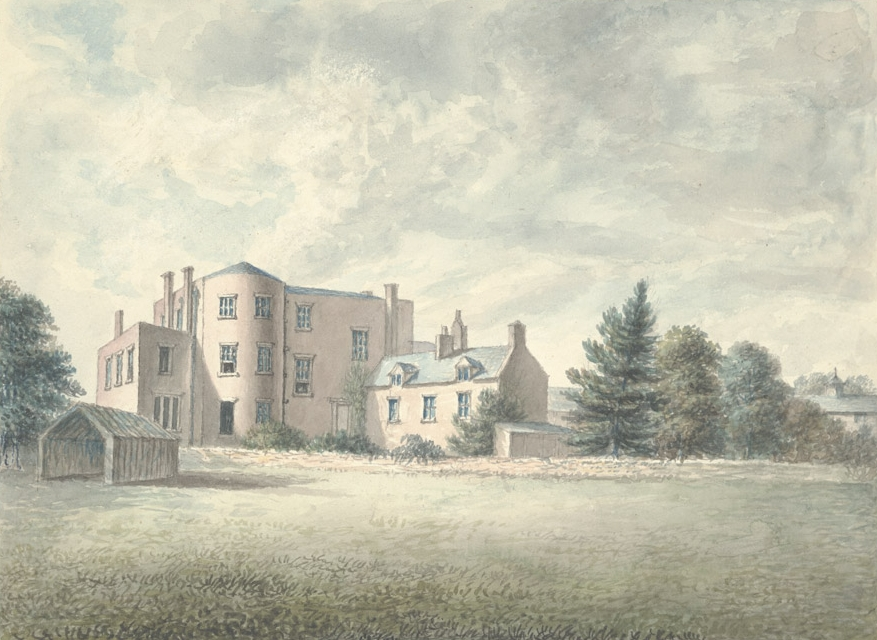
Cefn, house belonging to Roger Kenyon Esq, 1795
