= Black Rock =

Black Rock, Blackrock, Black Rocks, etc. may refer to:

== Places ==
=== Australia ===
- Black Rock, South Australia, a hamlet on the Black Rock Plains
- Black Rock, Victoria, a suburb of Melbourne
- Blackrock, Queensland, a locality in Shire of Hinchinbrook
- Black Rock (Western Australia), in Two Peoples Bay Nature Reserve
- Black Rocks, Queensland, rocky islets south of Bramble Cay in the Torres Strait
- Black Rocks, South Australia, an islet off the western Eyre Peninsula in Avoid Bay Islands Conservation Park
- South Black Rock, an island off north-west Tasmania

=== Canada ===
- Black Rock, Colchester County, Nova Scotia
- Black Rock, Cumberland County, Nova Scotia
- Black Rock, Kings County, Nova Scotia
- Black Rock, Victoria County, Nova Scotia
- Black Rock Mountain (Alberta)
- Irish Commemorative Stone, also known as The Black Rock, a monument to Irish typhoid victims in Montreal

=== Ireland ===
- Blackrock, Cork, suburb of Cork city
- Blackrock, Dublin, southern coastal suburb of Dublin city
  - Blackrock railway station, railway station serving the Dublin city suburb
- Black Rock, Co. Limerick, mountain among the Ballyhouras
- Blackrock, County Louth, a village
- Blackrock Island, County Mayo, rocky islet toward Blacksod Bay, County Mayo
- Black Rock Mountain, County Wexford

=== New Zealand ===
- Black Rocks (Waikato)
- Black Rocks (Bay of Islands)
- Black Rocks (Kauri Bay)

=== South Georgia (Southern Atlantic) ===
- Black Rock, South Georgia, low rock well off Shag Rocks
- Black Rocks, South Georgia, near Framnaes Point

=== United Kingdom ===
- Black Rock (Brighton and Hove), an area near Brighton Marina, South East England
- Black Rock, a crossing of the River Severn at Portskewett, Monmouthshire
- Black Rock Gorge, through which the Allt Graad flows in Scotland
- Black Rocks (Derbyshire), England

=== United States ===
- Black Rock, Arizona, wilderness area of northwest Arizona
- Black Rock, Arkansas, city in Lawrence County
- Black Rocks, a geological feature in the Temescal Mountains, in Riverside County, California
- Black Rock Falls, waterfall in Uvas Canyon County Park, near Morgan Hill, California
- Black Rock, Bridgeport, Connecticut, a neighborhood
  - Black Rock Harbor, adjacent harbor in Bridgeport, Connecticut
- Black Rock State Park, near Watertown, Connecticut
- Black Rock Turnpike, a name for Connecticut State Route 58 in southwestern Connecticut
- Black Rock Mountain State Park, near Mountain City, Georgia
- Black Rock, Hawaii, an alternative name for Kāohikaipu, a volcanic island near Oahu
- Black Rock, Indiana, an extinct community in Warren County
- Black Rock (Bristol County, Massachusetts)
- Black Rock, a pillar in Montana
- Black Rock Desert, region of northwestern Nevada
- Black Rock, New Mexico, a census-designated place in northwestern New Mexico
- Black Rock, Buffalo, former town and now a neighborhood in Buffalo, New York
- Black Rock Forest, nature preserve in the Hudson highlands of Orange County, New York
- Black Rock, Oregon, community in Polk County
- Blackrock, Pennsylvania, an unincorporated community in York County, Pennsylvania
- Blackrock, Rhode Island
- Black Rock (Great Salt Lake), a historic landmark in Tooele County, Utah
- Black Rock Desert volcanic field, Utah
- Black Rock, Millard County, Utah, a ghost town
- Black Rock (West Virginia), a mountain

=== Elsewhere ===
- Black Rock, Barbados
- Black Rock, Trinidad and Tobago
- Black Rock Peak, Hangzhou, Zhejiang Province, China
- Black Rocks (Saint Kitts), a notable rock formation on the northeastern coast of Saint Kitts
- Black Rock (Heard Island)

== Arts, entertainment, and media ==
=== Fictional entities ===
- Black Rock, a beached ship in Lost (TV series); see Mythology of Lost
- Blackrock (comics), an adversary of Superman's in DC Comics
- Blackrock Mountain, a mountain in the Warcraft universe, mostly seen in World of Warcraft

=== Fictional universes ===
- Black Rock Shooter, a Japanese media franchise

=== Films ===
- Black Rock (2012 film), starring Katie Aselton, Lake Bell, and Kate Bosworth
- Blackrock (film), a 1997 Australian film based on the 1992 play

=== Literature ===
- Black Rock (novel), by Steve Harris
- Blackrock (play), 1992 Australian play inspired by the real-life rape and murder of schoolgirl Leigh Leigh

=== Music ===
- Black Rock (band), dance production duo from France
- Black Rock (James Blood Ulmer album), 1982
- Black Rock (Joe Bonamassa album), 2010
- Black Rock (Onyx album), 2018

== Buildings and structures ==
- Black Rock, a nickname for the CBS Building in New York City
- Black Rock Airport, New Mexico
- Black Rock Dam (Schuylkill River), Pennsylvania
- Black Rock Halt railway station, near Criccieth, Wales; closed in 1976
- Black Rock Lock, the terminal lock on the Black Rock Canal, part of the Erie Canal
- Blackrock railway station, in Blackrock, Dublin
- Blackrock Castle, in Blackrock, Cork
- BlackRock Center for the Arts, in Germantown, Maryland
- Blackrock Clinic, in Blackrock, Dublin
- The Black Rock, a memorial to Irish typhus victims in Goose Village, Montreal

== Businesses and organisations ==
- BlackRock, an American multinational investment company
- Black Rock City, LLC, the U.S.-based organization behind the annual Burning Man festival
- Black Rock Coalition, a U.S.-based organization promoting black musicians
- Black Rock Studio, a UK video game developer
- Blackrock College, a secondary school in Blackrock, County Dublin, Ireland
- Blackrocks Brewery, a craft brewery in Marquette, Michigan, US

== Sports ==
- Black Rock FC, an American soccer club
- Black Rock Football Club, Australia
- Black Rock Yacht Club, Australia
- Blackrock College RFC, rugby club associated with Blackrock College in Blackrock, Dublin, Ireland
- Blackrock GAA (Blackrock Gaelic Athletic Association), also known as Blackrock Hunting Club, in Blackrock, Cork, Ireland
- Blackrock Rugby Festival, a schools' rugby festival hosted by St. Mary's School in Nairobi, Kenya

== Other uses ==
- Black Rock (hen), variety of domestic chicken
- Blackrock (geology), type of limestone

== See also ==
- Black Hill (disambiguation)
- Black Hills (disambiguation)
- Black metal
- Black Mountain (disambiguation)
- Black Mountains (disambiguation)
- Black Stone (disambiguation)
- Black Stone, a Muslim object of reverence in Mecca
- Blakroc, a 2009 collaboration project between the band The Black Keys and a number of hiphop and R&B artists
- Blackrock railway station (disambiguation)
- Blackstone (disambiguation)
- Blackstones (disambiguation)
- Lapis Niger (Latin: "Black Stone"), ancient shrine in Rome
- Yugen Blakrok, singer
