= Siah Sang =

Siah Sang or Siyah Sang (Persian: سياه سنگ, "Blackstone") may refer to:

- Siah Sang, Fariman, Razavi Khorasan Province
- Siah Sang, Zaveh, Razavi Khorasan Province
- Siah Sang-e Jadid, Tehran Province
- Tepe Maranjan, a hill in Kabul, Afghanistan

== See also ==
- Blackstone and Black Stone (disambiguation)
- Blackrock and Black Rock (disambiguation)
