= Black Rock, Nova Scotia =

Black Rock, Nova Scotia may refer to the following places in Nova Scotia:

- Black Rock, Colchester County
- Black Rock, Cumberland County
- Black Rock, Kings County
- Black Rock, Victoria County
