= Blackstone =

Blackstone may refer to:

== People ==
- Charles Blackstone (born 1977), fiction writer
- Elliott Blackstone (1924–2006), former police sergeant and LGBT advocate
- Gay Blackstone (born 1952), American magician, producer, and director, widow of Harry Blackstone Jr.
- Harriet Blackstone (1864–1939), American painter
- Harry Blackstone Sr. (1885–1965), famous American magician known as "The Great Blackstone" and father of Harry Blackstone, Jr.
- Harry Blackstone Jr. (1934–1997), popular stage magician and television performer of the late 20th century
- Ian Blackstone (born 1964), English former footballer
- Jerry Blackstone, director of choirs at the University of Michigan
- John Wilford Blackstone Sr. (1796–1868), American lawyer and legislator
- John Wilford Blackstone Jr. (1835–1911), American lawyer and legislator
- Milton Blackstone (1906–1983), publicity agent for Eddie Fisher
- Tessa Blackstone, Baroness Blackstone (born 1942), British politician
- Timothy Blackstone (1829–1900), Chicago Railroad and Stock Yard president
- Sir William Blackstone (1723–1780), English jurist
  - Blackstone's formulation, a principle in criminal law named for the jurist
  - The Commentaries on the Laws of England by William Blackstone, a 1769 major legal text of the 18th century; often referred to as "Blackstone" or "Blackstone's Commentaries"
- William Eugene Blackstone (1841–1935), American evangelist and Christian Zionist
- William Seymour Blackstone (1809–1881), 19th-century British MP and grandson of William Blackstone the jurist, above
- William Blackstone, aka William Blaxton (1595–1675), early English settler in New England

== Businesses ==
- Blackstone & Co, a diesel engine and agricultural engineering company in Stamford, Lincolnshire, which became Mirrlees Blackstone
- Blackstone Audio, publisher of audiobooks
- Blackstone Chambers, a set of barristers' chambers in London
- Blackstone Legal Fellowship, legal training and internship program
- Black Stone Minerals, a Houston-based oil and natural gas corporation
- Blackstone Press, a subsidiary of Oxford University Press
- Blackstone Winery, a Gonzales, California winery owned by Constellation Brands
- Blackstone Inc., American private equity, investment banking, and asset management firm
- Blackstones Bar Maine's longest operating LGBTQ bar, and currently Portland's only LGBTQ bar.

== Places ==
=== Australia ===
- Blackstone, Queensland, a suburb in the City of Ipswich
- Blackstone, Western Australia, known as Papulankutja
- Blackstone Heights, Tasmania

=== United Kingdom ===
- Blackstone Edge, an area of moorland along the Lancashire (Greater Manchester) and West Yorkshire county boundary in England
- Blackstone, West Sussex, England

=== United States ===
- Blackstone, Illinois
- Blackstone, Massachusetts
- Blackstone, Pennsylvania
- Blackstone, Providence, Rhode Island, a neighborhood
  - Blackstone Boulevard Park, in Providence, Rhode Island
  - Blackstone Park Conservation District, in Providence, Rhode Island
  - Blackstone Park Historic District, in Providence, Rhode Island
- Blackstone, Virginia
  - Blackstone Army Airfield, Virginia
- The Blackstone River in Massachusetts and Rhode Island
  - The Blackstone Valley, a National Heritage Corridor along the Blackstone River
  - Blackstone River Bikeway, a planned rail trail
  - Blackstone Valley Regional Vocational Technical High School, Upton, Massachusetts

=== Canada ===
- Blackstone Lake, Ontario

== Fiction ==
- Blackstone (novel), a 1972 novel featuring the character Edmund 'Beau' Blackstone, a fictional 19th century detective created by "Richard Falkirk" (Derek Lambert); the first of six such novels
- Blackstone Chronicles, a series of mystery and thriller novels authored by John Saul
- Blackstone Fortress, a type of space station in the fictional universe of Warhammer 40,000
- Blackstone (TV series), the fictional Blackstone First Nation's struggles with corruption, politics, and the need for change
- Blackstone, the Magic Detective, a radio series starring a fictionalized version of Harry Blackstone, Sr.
- The Blackstone, a country club in the TV series Royal Pains

== Other ==
- Black Stone, a Muslim object of reverence
- Blackstone Avenue, a major roadway in Fresno, California, USA
- Blackstone Hall, a dormitory at the University of Chicago
- The Blackstone Hotel, a Chicago hotel
- Blackstone Hotel (Omaha, Nebraska), a 1915 Omaha landmark currently known as the Blackstone Center
- Blackstone Library, Chicago's first public library
- Blackstone Memorial, a Zionist petition written by William Eugene Blackstone
- Blackstone, a codename for ColdFusion 7.0 - beta of ColdFusion MX 7.0, a product of Macromedia
- Blackstone, in reference to the Black P. Stones gang
- HTC BlackStone, a Windows Mobile phone also known as the HTC Touch HD
- Operation Blackstone, part of Operation Torch, the Allied landings in Africa during World War II

== See also ==
- Black Stone (disambiguation)
- Blackstones (disambiguation)
- Blackstone River (disambiguation)
- Black Rock (disambiguation)
- William J. Blakistone (died 1882), American politician and lawyer
