= Porthmadog railway station (disambiguation) =

Porthmadog railway station is a National Rail station in Porthmadog, Wales

Porthmadog railway station may also refer to:

- Porthmadog Harbour railway station, on the Ffestiniog & Welsh Highland Railways
- Porthmadog railway station (Welsh Highland Heritage Railway)
