= Yuquan Campus, Zhejiang University =

Campus of Zhejiang University in Hangzhou, China

Coordinates: 30.2611°N 120.1250°E

- 浙江大学玉泉校区
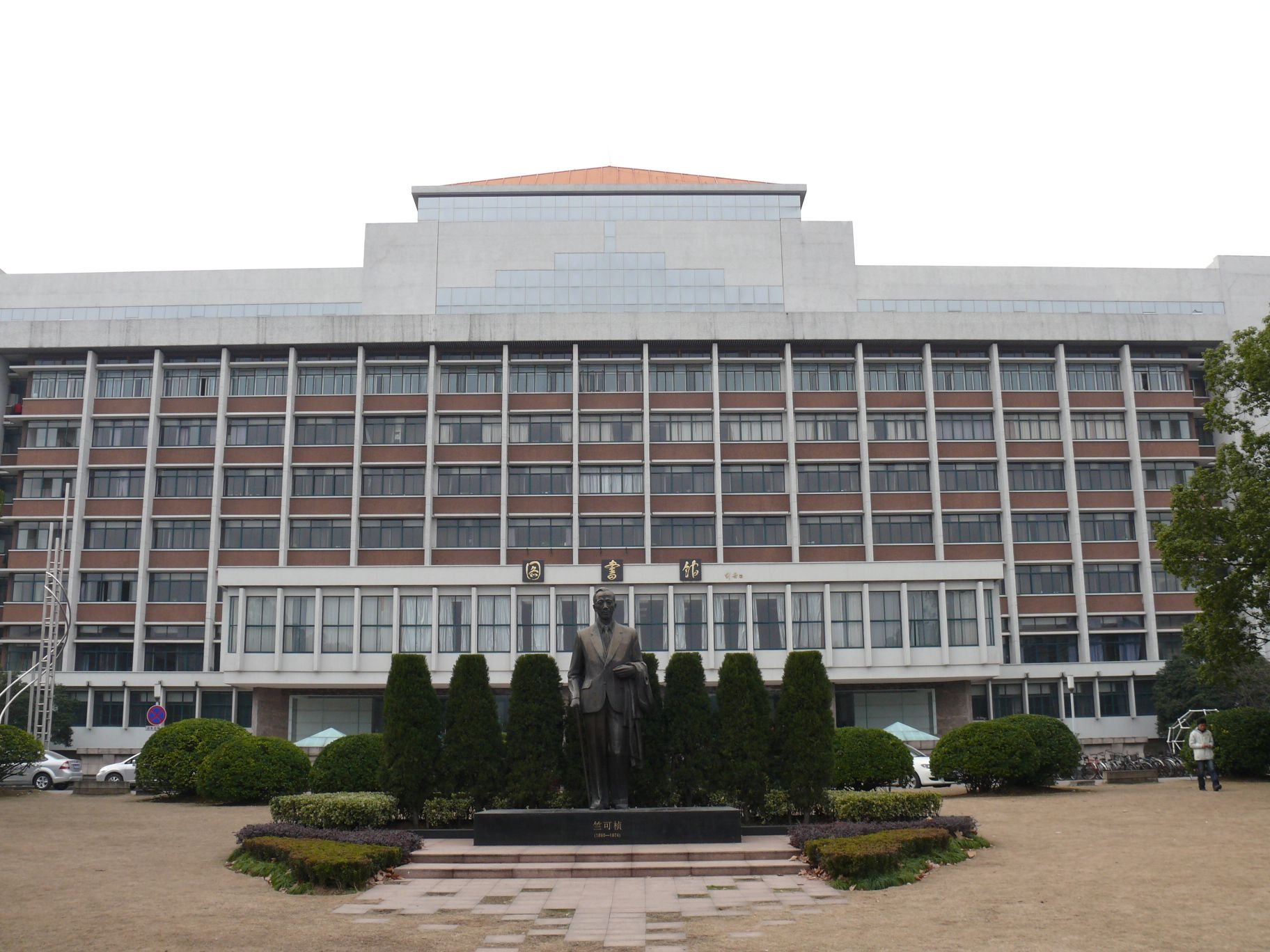
- The front of the library
- Established: 1956; 70 years ago
- Parent institution: Zhejiang University
- Location: 38 Zheda Road, Xihu District, Hangzhou, Zhejiang, 310007, China
- Campus: 136 hectares (340 acres)

Yuquan Campus (simplified Chinese: 玉泉校区; traditional Chinese: 玉泉校區; pinyin: Yùquán Xiàoqū), is a campus of Zhejiang University. It was the location of former headquarters of the university. Today, it also owns some administrative departments of the university.

== Introduction ==
The campus is urban in Hangzhou City, Zhejiang Province.

The campus is sited on the northwest corner of the West Lake, with the Lingfeng Hill (灵峰) and Laohe Hill (老和山) on its back side and it faces to the Wushi Hill (乌石峰). It's close to the Yuquan historic site (the Jade Spring) and named after it. There is a botany garden aside, which is one of the largest in China.

The campus has a total area of 2044 mu, and a total building area close to one million m^{2}.

== Notable buildings ==
Hong Kongmedia mogulRun Run ShawCoching CHU

== Institutions ==
- Faculty of Science (headquartered)
  - School of Mathematical Sciences
  - Department of Physics
  - Department of Chemistry
  - School of Earth Sciences
- Faculty of Engineering (headquartered)
  - School of Mechanical Engineering
  - School of Material Science and Engineering
  - College of Energy Engineering
  - College of Electrical Engineering
  - College of Chemical and Biological Engineering
  - School of Aeronautics and Astronautics
  - Department of Polymer Science and Engineering
- Faculty of Information (headquartered)
  - College of Optical Science and Engineering
  - College of Information Science and Electronic Engineering
  - College of Control Science and Engineering
  - College of Computer Science and Technology
  - College of Biomedical Engineering and Instrument Science
