= Blackrock railway station (disambiguation) =

Blackrock railway station is in Blackrock, Dublin, Ireland.

Blackrock railway station may also refer to:

- Blackrock railway station (County Cork), in Blackrock, Cork, Ireland
- Black Rock Halt railway station, in Gwynedd, Wales
- Black Rock Station on the Volk's Electric Railway in Brighton

== See also ==
- Black Rock (disambiguation)
