= Criccieth railway station =

Railway station in Gwynedd, Wales

Criccieth Welsh: Cricieth
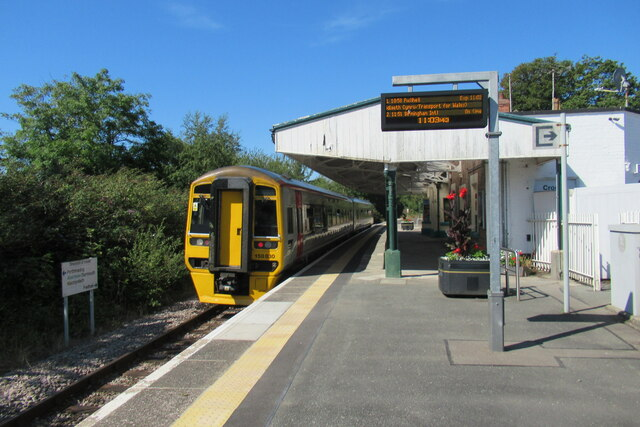

General information
- Location: Criccieth, Gwynedd; Wales
- Coordinates: 52.918°N 4.238°W
- Grid reference: SH496380
- Manager: Transport for Wales
- Platforms: 1

Other information
- Station code: CCC
- Classification: DfT category F2

History
- Original company: Aberystwith and Welsh Coast Railway
- Pre-grouping: Cambrian Railways
- Post-grouping: Great Western Railway

Key dates
- 2 September 1867: opened

Passengers
- 2021/22: ▲16,316
- 2022/23: ▲26,218
- 2023/24: ▼25,666
- 2024/25: ▲36,588
- 2025/26: ▲41,662
Location
Notes
- Passenger statistics from the Office of Rail and Road

Criccieth railway station serves the seaside town of Criccieth on the Llŷn Peninsula in Gwynedd, Wales.

== History ==
The station was opened on 2 September 1867 by the Aberystwith and Welsh Coast Railway.

Goods services were withdrawn in 1964. The line between Caernarvon and Afonwen was closed the same year. Prior to this there was a through service in the summer between Criccieth and London and Birmingham. Services included London Euston via Crewe, Chester, Llandudno Junction and Caernarvon; the Pwllheli portion was detached at Afonwen and the forward coaches proceeded to Portmadoc (the spellings are those used at the time). There was also a summer Saturday service between London Paddington and Pwllheli, via Birmingham Snow Hill, Shrewsbury and Machynlleth.

The station originally had two platforms with a passing loop; this was taken out of use when the signal box closed on 16 October 1977, though the redundant track remained in place for several years. The station is now a single-platform, unstaffed halt. The platform is accessible from the High Street, and there is a car park. The main station building is in private use.

== Services ==
The station is on the Cambrian Coast Railway with passenger services to Pwllheli, Porthmadog, Harlech, Barmouth, Tywyn, and Machynlleth. Trains call every two hours each way on weekdays, with 5 trains each way on Sundays.

Preceding station	National Rail	Following station
Penychain	Transport for Wales; Cambrian Coast Line	Porthmadog
	Historical railways	
Afon Wen; Line open; station closed	Cambrian Railways; Aberystwith and Welsh Coast Railway	Black Rock Halt; Line open; station closed
