= Morgan Island =

Island in north of Heard Island in the Indian Ocean

Coordinates: 53°1′S 73°34′E

Morgan Island is a small island while also being the largest feature in a group of islands located 1 nautical mile (2 km) east of Cape Bidlingmaier, off the north side of Heard Island in the Indian Ocean. The island group was charted as extending across "Morgan Bay" on an 1860 sketch map compiled by Captain H.C. Chester, an American sealer, and "Morgan Islands" appears on the 1874 chart and the scientific reports of a British expedition under George Nares in HMS Challenger. Morgan Island was surveyed in 1948 by the Australian National Antarctic Research Expeditions, who restricted the name Morgan as the largest feature in the group.

Black Rock lies immediately northwest of Morgan Island.

== See also ==
- List of antarctic and sub-antarctic islands
- Sunken Rock
