= Sunken Rock =

Sunken rock off Heard Island in the Antarctic

Coordinates: 53°1′S 73°34′E

Sunken Rock is a sunken rock lying 0.2 nautical miles (0.4 km) north-northeast of Morgan Island, close off the north side of Heard Island. It was surveyed and named by the ANARE (Australian National Antarctic Research Expeditions) in 1948.
