= Morfa Bychan =

Coordinates: 52.914°N 4.164°W

Morfa Bychan: Welsh: Morfa Bychan
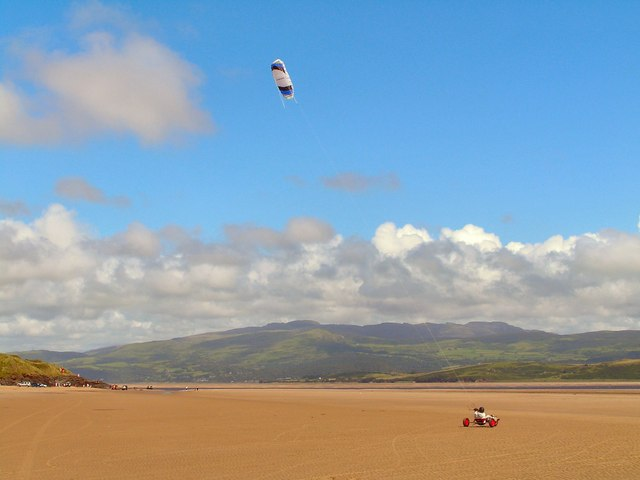
- Traeth Morfa Bychan

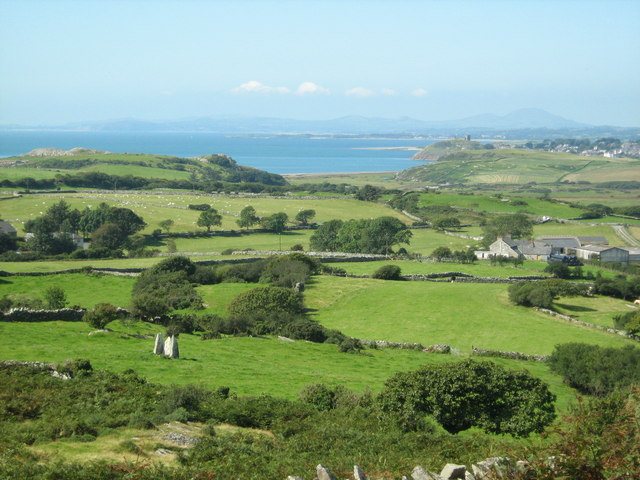
- Farmland near Morfa Bychan

- Location within Gwynedd
- Population: 524
- OS grid reference: SH544374
- Community: Porthmadog
- Principal area: Gwynedd
- Preserved county: Gwynedd
- Country: Wales
- Sovereign state: United Kingdom
- Post town: PORTHMADOG
- Postcode district: LL49
- Dialling code: 01766
- Police: North Wales
- Fire: North Wales
- Ambulance: Welsh
- UK Parliament: Dwyfor Meirionnydd
- Senedd Cymru – Welsh Parliament: Dwyfor Meirionnydd

Morfa Bychan is a village located in Gwynedd, North Wales, with a population of over 500, with an almost equal number of people born in England or Wales.

== The village ==
Situated on the Llŷn Peninsula just west of Borth-y-Gest and Porthmadog, Morfa Bychan can be reached from Porthmadog via the Borth-y-Gest/Morfa Bychan road or a country lane off the A497.

Morfa Bychan has a small supermarket, a fish-and-chips shop, a gift shop and a children's playground.

The village also contains Porthmadog Golf Club and is near to the Glan Morfa Trout fishery.

== Traeth Morfa Bychan ==
Morfa Bychan has a beach known as Traeth Morfa Bychan which stretches for two miles from the eastern end of the National Trust's Ynys Cyngar on the Afon Glaslyn (River Glaslyn) estuary along Tremadog Bay to Criccieth beach which is accessible at low tide. It is unusual as cars are allowed onto it, although this means that there can be problems with irresponsible drivers. The sea along Traeth Morfa Bychan is shallow, with a gentle gradient making it ideal for swimming and paddling. Dogs are allowed on the eastern and western sections of the beach but are banned from the central section. It also has designated bathing and boat-launching areas.

The sand dunes of Traeth Morfa Bychan are a Site of Special Scientific Interest.

Part of the 1971 film Macbeth was filmed at Traeth Morfa Bychan.

The cover picture from the Manic Street Preachers album This Is My Truth Tell Me Yours was taken at Traeth Morfa Bychan.

== Ynys Cyngar ==
There is also a small beach below the National Trust's Ynys Cyngar, the original point where Madocks was going to site a port before moving it to Porthmadog.

== Caravan parks ==
There are a number of caravan parks at Morfa Bychan including Greenacres, Garreg Goch, Cardigan View and Glan Morfa Mawr, the largest of which is Greenacres. There is also a touring and camping site just outside the village by Black Rock Sands.

== Notable people ==
Barri Griffiths - wrestler in World Wrestling Entertainment as Mason Ryan.

David Owen (harpist) - harpist and composer of Dafydd y Garreg Wen

== Photo gallery ==
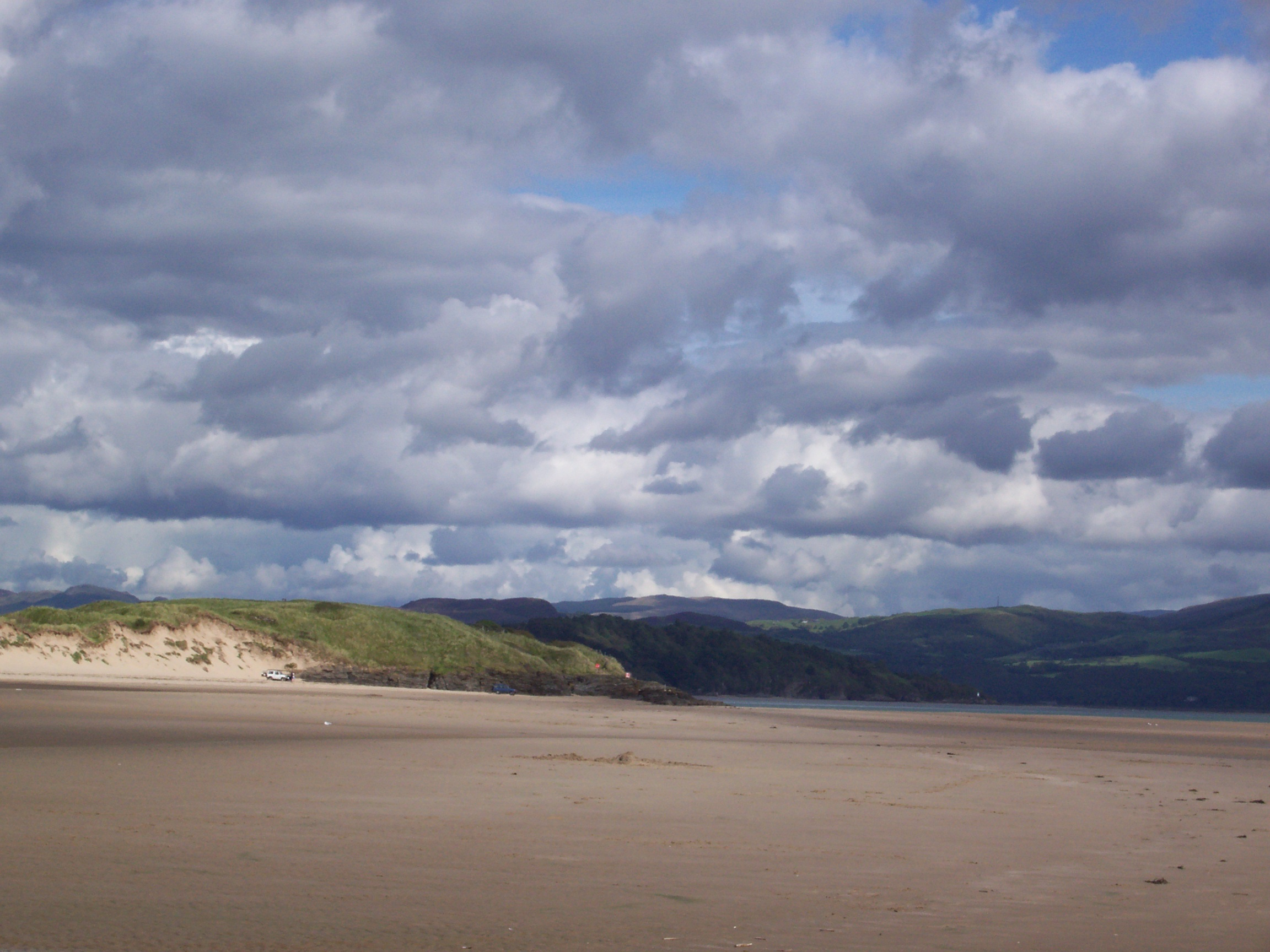
Black Rock Sands Beach looking towards Borth-y-Gest, Ynys Cyngar and the Afon Glaslyn estuary.

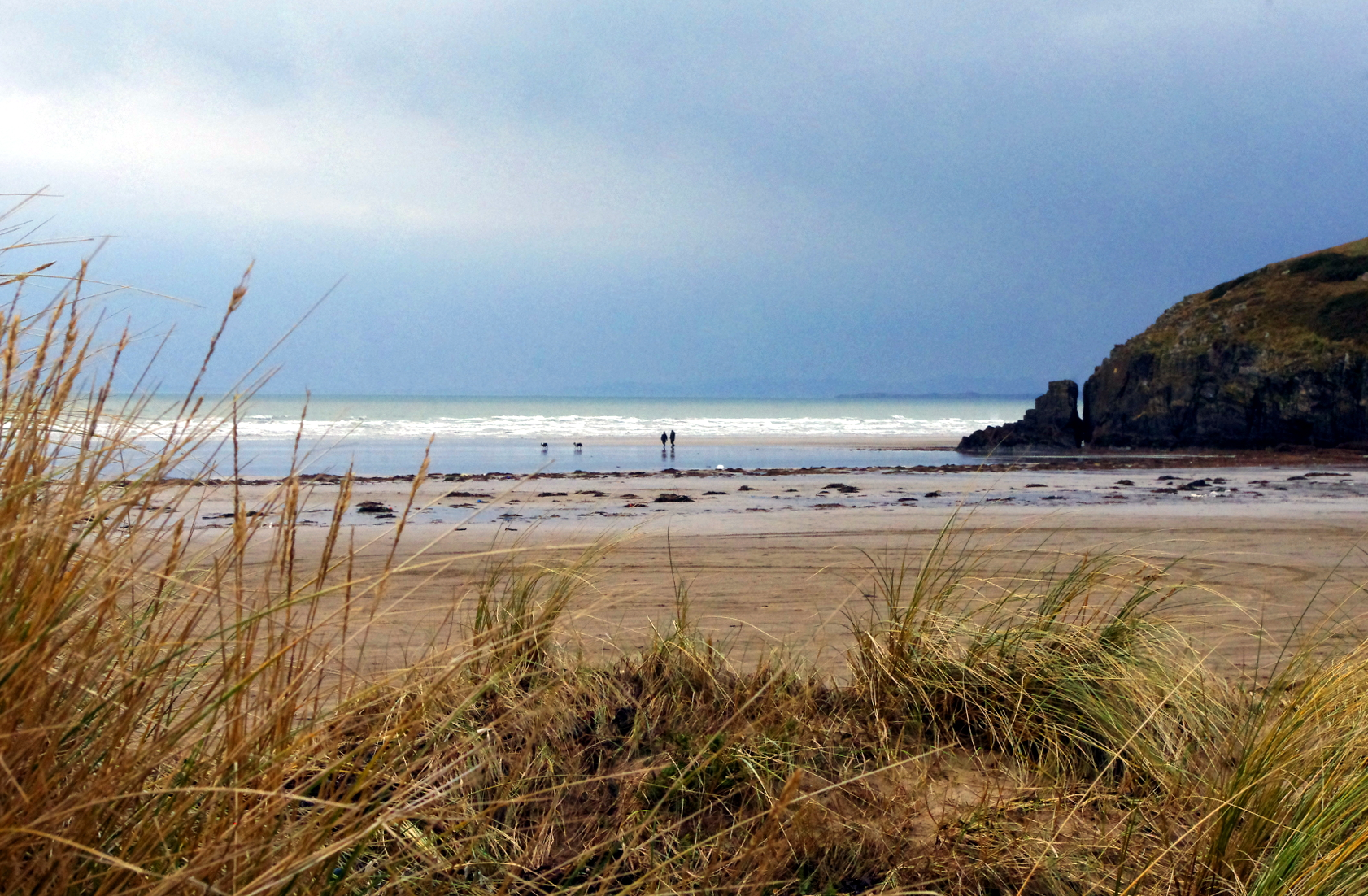

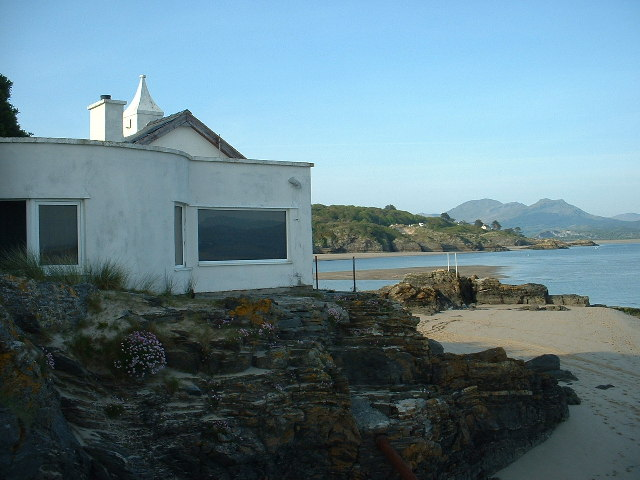
Ynys Cyngar.

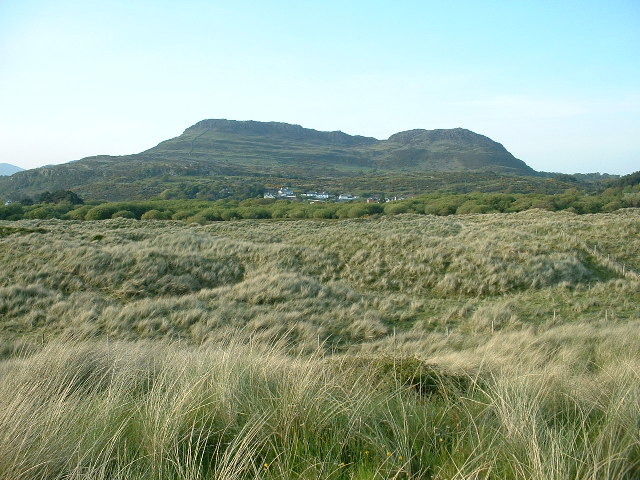
Dunes at Traeth Morfa Bychan.
