= Steve Harris (writer) =

English novelist

Steve Harris (born 29 September 1954 in Basingstoke, died 4 October 2016) was an English novelist who was known for his work in the horror genre.

== Works ==
=== Novels ===
- Adventureland a.k.a. "The Eyes of the Beast" (1990)
- Wulf (1991)
- The Hoodoo Man (1992)
- Angels (1993)
- Black Rock (1996)
- The Devil On May St (1997)
- Strakers Island (1998)

=== Novella ===
- Challenging The Wulf (1997)

=== Short stories ===
- Harry's Black and Decker (1989)
- Maximum Visibility (1997)
- Escape from Doughnut City (1998)
