= Black Stone (disambiguation) =

The Black Stone is a Muslim object of reverence.

Black Stone may also refer to:

- "The Black Stone", a 1931 short story by Robert E. Howard
- "Black Stone: Magic & Steel", a 2003 role-playing video game
- "Black Stone" (song), a 2005 pop song
- Black Stone (2015 film), a South Korean-French film about an army deserter starring Won Tae-hee
- Black Stone (2022 film), a Greek film
- Black Stone is the highest peak of the Jabllanica
- Al-Hajar al-Aswad, a city in Syria
- Black mecca, a place in the United States such as Atlanta or Harlem, to which African Americans are attracted
- Lapis Niger, an ancient shrine in the Roman Forum
- Black stone is another name for a snake-stone, an African traditional remedy against snakebite.

== See also ==
- Black Rock (disambiguation)
- Blackstone (disambiguation)
- Blackstones (disambiguation)
