= Moel y Gest =

Moel-y-Gest
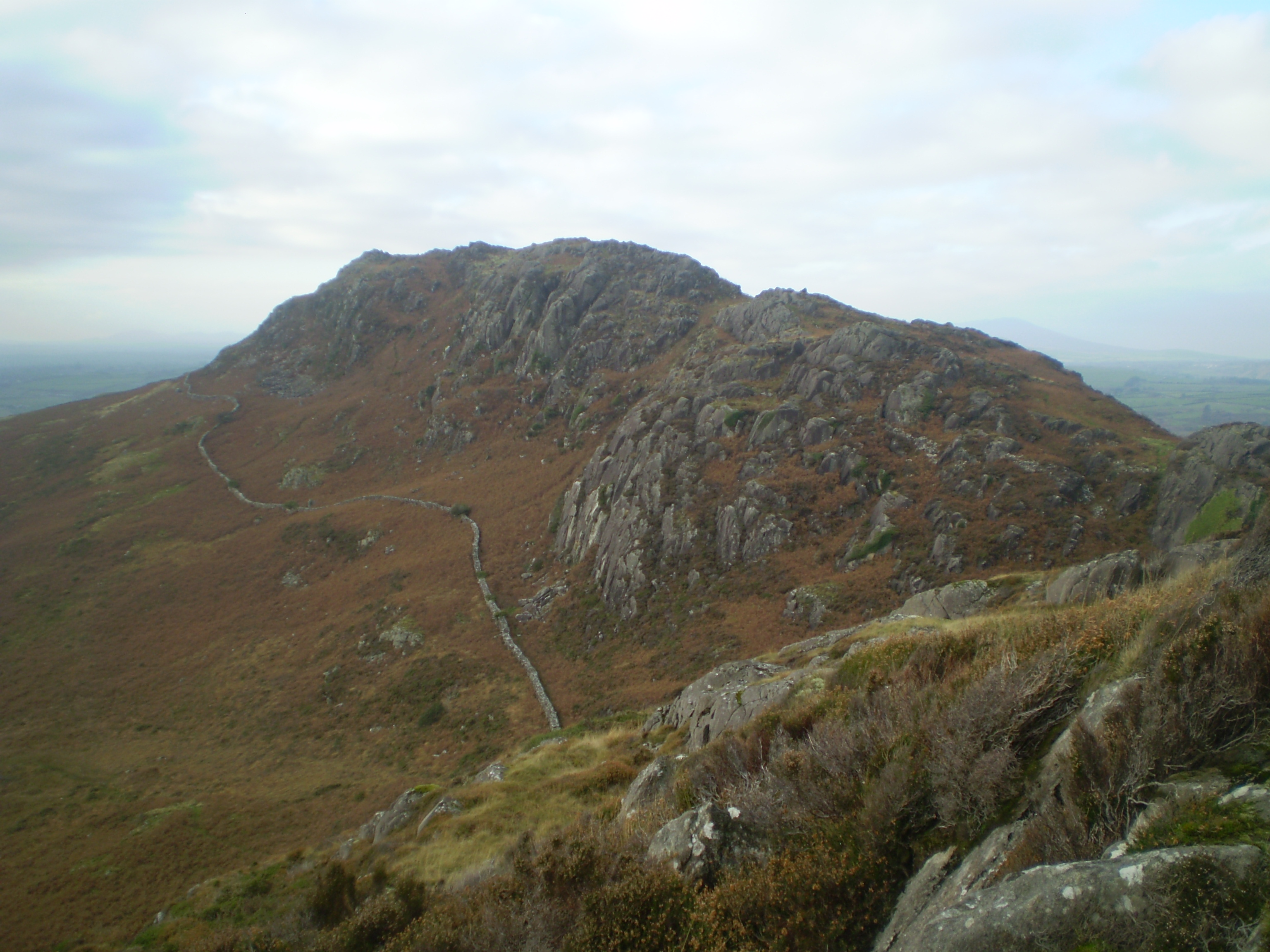

Highest point
- Elevation: 263 m (863 ft)
- Prominence: 236 m (774 ft)
- Listing: Marilyn
- Coordinates: 52°55′41″N 4°09′34″W

Geography
- Location within Gwynedd
- Location: Snowdonia
- OS grid: SH549388
- Topo map: Ordnance Survey Explorer 18

Moel y Gest is a 263 m (863 ft) hill to the west of Porthmadog in North Wales. It is a very rocky hill with high topographic prominence because of the lower land that surrounds it on all sides, and qualifies as a Marilyn. The views from the top are far ranging and include the Llŷn Peninsula, the Rhinogydd, Moelwynion, Moel Hebog, and Snowdon.

== Ascent ==
Moel y Gest can be climbed by approaching it from the south, starting from the unclassified road from Porthmadog to Black Rock Sands. This crosses pasture fields before reaching steeper slopes with gorse and bracken. There are a number of interconnecting paths on the slopes. The summit is rocky with rough grass and boulders, and there is a cairn and a path along the ridge. Other routes up the hill are available from the northeast, north and elsewhere but there seems to be no main path.

== Historic sites ==
At the summit of Moel y Gest is a hillfort which shows some resemblance to the "nuclear forts" of the Early Middle Ages found in Scotland. Like these, it has a "court" system with loops of wall and a "citadel". However the fort has several peculiarities which makes it difficult to understand. For most of its perimeter, the boundary defenses follow natural features to give it good defensive potential, but at the northwestern part, where the entrance lies, it is set back from the cliff making it vulnerable to an approaching enemy who would be invisible until close at hand. The perimeter wall contains a selectively large numbers of white, quartz stones, and it is possible the fort had a religious rather than military significance.

There is also the remains of a round hut on the northern flanks of the hill at an elevation of about 500 ft (150 m). This has an entrance on the southwestern side and a diameter of 12 ft (3.7 m), with walls 2.5 ft (0.8 m) thick and 1 ft (0.3 m) high.
