= Blackstone River (disambiguation) =

Blackstone River is a river in the U.S. states of Massachusetts and Rhode Island.

Blackstone River may also refer to:

Rivers:

- Blackstone River (Alberta), Canada
- Blackstone River (Yukon), Canada, a tributary of the Peel Watershed

Other:

- Blackstone River Bikeway, a planned paved trail defining the course of the East Coast Greenway in the United States

== See also ==
- Blackstone (disambiguation)
