= Porthmadog railway station =

Railway station in Gwynedd, Wales

Porthmadog
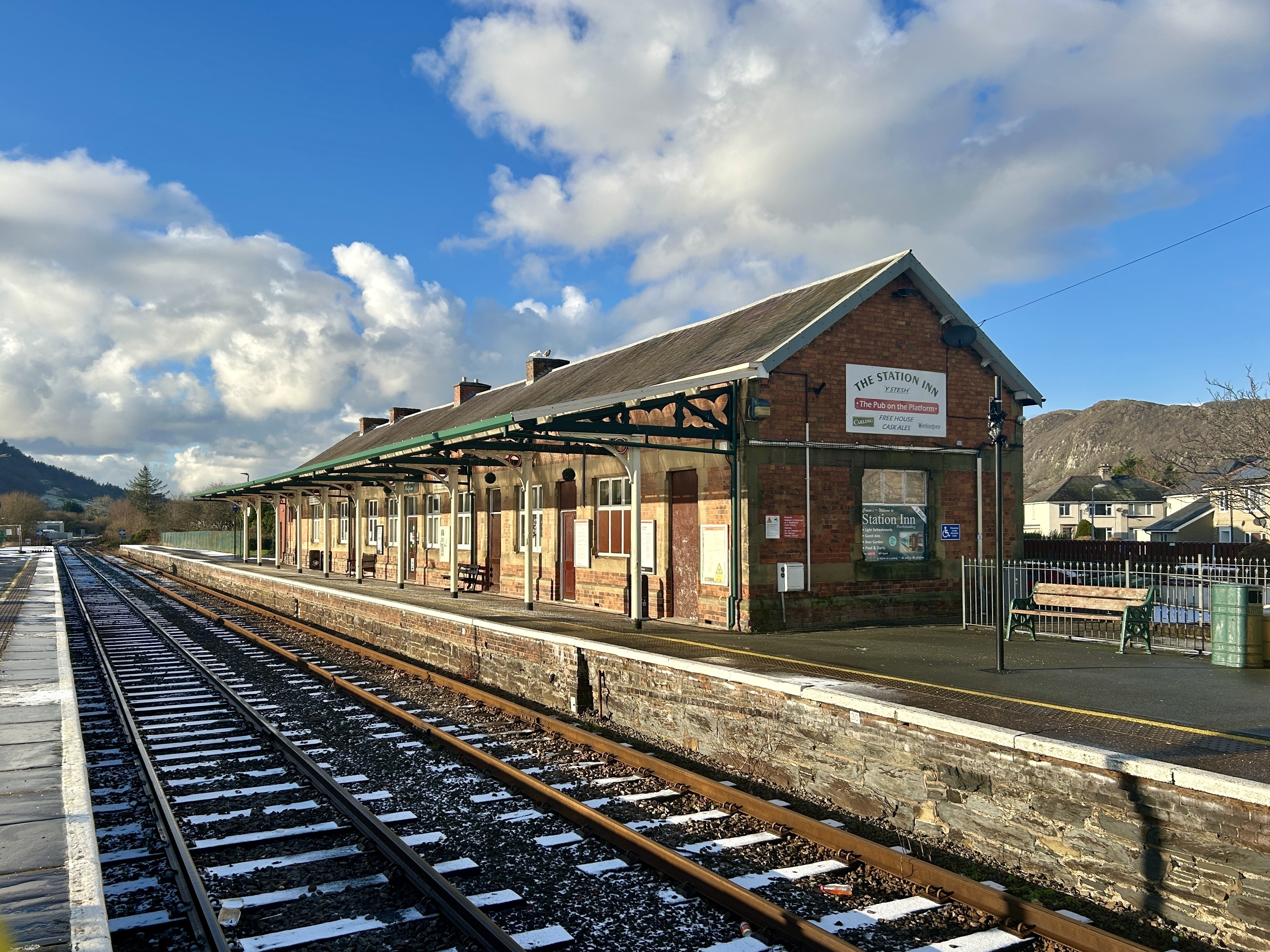

General information
- Location: Porthmadog, Gwynedd, Wales
- Coordinates: 52.931°N 4.134°W
- Grid reference: SH565391
- Manager: Transport for Wales
- Platforms: 2

Other information
- Station code: PTM
- Classification: DfT category F1

History
- Original company: Aberystwith and Welsh Coast Railway
- Pre-grouping: Cambrian Railways
- Post-grouping: Great Western Railway

Passengers
- 2020/21: ▼9,506
- 2021/22: ▲38,718
- 2022/23: ▲69,024
- 2023/24: ▲81,954
- 2024/25: ▲100,700
Location
Notes
- Passenger statistics from the Office of Rail and Road

Porthmadog railway station serves the town of Porthmadog, on the Llŷn Peninsula in Gwynedd, Wales. It lies on the Cambrian Coast Railway, with direct passenger services to Pwllheli, Harlech, Barmouth, Machynlleth, Shrewsbury and Birmingham.

== History ==
Porthmadog has had a number of stations using this name, or the original name, Portmadoc. The present station was opened by the Aberystwith and Welsh Coast Railway as Portmadoc on 12 September 1867, and was renamed Porthmadog on 5 May 1975. The Ffestiniog Railway's Porthmadog Harbour station was originally only a shunting yard, but was upgraded to a full station on 6 January 1865. The Welsh Highland Heritage Railway (WHHR) operates a station also known as Porthmadog, which opened on 2 August 1980. Although located on High Street, is also (incorrectly) referred to as Tremadog Road.

Additionally there were two interim stations either side of, what is now, the Network Rail / WHHR Cae Pawb crossing; these were referred to as Portmadoc New, with the original Festiniog (Note: Festiniog was the original English spelling, used until 1973.) Railway station becoming Portmadoc Old. The Festiniog Railway station opened on 8 June 1923 and closed on 16 September 1939, while the WHHR station opened in May 1929 and closed on 28 September 1936.

Until the line between Bangor and Afon Wen was closed in 1964, there was a through service in the summer to and from London Euston, via Crewe, Chester, Llandudno Junction and Caernarvon. The Pwllheli portion was detached at Afon Wen and the forward coaches proceeded to Portmadoc, as it was then known. There was also a summer service between London Paddington and Pwllheli, via Birmingham Snow Hill, Shrewsbury and Machynlleth.

In 2014, main line services were suspended due to structural problems with the Pont Briwet viaduct near Llandecwyn. Network Rail and Gwynedd Council were carrying out work to build a £20 million replacement for the current bridge a few metres downstream but, in doing so, had caused the old one to sink and thus made it unsafe for both rail and road traffic. A replacement bus service operated during the railway's closure.

Between 2020 and 2023, the line experienced temporary closures for a major £30 million restoration of the nearby Barmouth Viaduct, which was successfully completed in December 2023.

== Services ==
Trains between Pwllheli and Machynlleth call at Porthmadog approximately once every two hours, with most services continuing on to Birmingham International, via Shrewsbury.

Preceding station	National Rail	Following station
Criccieth	Transport for Wales; Cambrian Coast Line	Minffordd
	Historical railways	
Black Rock Halt; Line open, station closed	Cambrian Railways; Aberystwith and Welsh Coast Railway	Minffordd; Line and station open
Heritage railways
Change for the Ffestiniog and Welsh Highland Railways at Porthmadog Harbour, and the Welsh Highland Heritage Railway at Porthmadog (WHHR)
