= Black Rock (West Virginia) =

Mountain in Mineral County, West Virginia, United States

Coordinates: 39.3431554°N 79.1105883°W

Black Rock is a summit in Mineral County, West Virginia, in the United States. With an elevation of 3,159 feet (963 m), Black Rock is the 296th highest summit in the state of West Virginia.

Black Rock appears black when viewed from afar, hence the name.
