= Black Rock (Bristol County, Massachusetts) =

Island in Bristol County, Massachusetts, United States

Coordinates: 41°34′41″N 70°51′43″W

Black Rock is a barren, uninhabited island in Bristol County, Massachusetts. It has a beacon structure.
