= Blackstones Bar =

LGBTQ bar in Portland, Maine, U.S.

- Location: Portland, Maine, United States
- Capacity: 87
- Type: Bar
- Event: LGBTQ focused neighborhood bar

Construction
- Opened: 1987 (39 years ago)
- Renovated: 2019

Blackstones Bar is a gay bar in Portland, Maine. Located in the West End neighborhood on Pine Street close to Longfellow Square, the bar has served as a popular gathering place for members of the LGBTQ community since its establishment in 1987. Portland's first gay bar, Roland's Tavern, was founded in 1967 and closed following an arson attack in 1981.

When it was established in 1987, the bar's facade featured seven floor-to-ceiling plate glass windows. These windows suffered consistent vandalism through 1991, when staff boarded them over. In 2019, the plywood sheaths were removed and new windows installed. The event was heralded as a significant milestone for the city of Portland and the local LGBTQ movement, with the story reported in several national newspapers, and featured in several national LGBTQ publications.
