= Siah Sang, Fariman =

Siah Sang سياه سنگ
- Village
- Location within Iran
- Coordinates: 35°36′42″N 59°53′38″E
- Country: Iran
- Province: Razavi Khorasan
- County: Fariman
- Bakhsh: Qalandarabad
- Rural District: Qalandarabad

Population (2006)
  - Total: 103
- Time zone: UTC+3:30 (IRST)
  - Summer (DST): UTC+4:30 (IRDT)

Siah Sang (Persian: سياه سنگ, also Romanized as Sīāh Sang) is a village in Qalandarabad Rural District, Qalandarabad District, Fariman County, Razavi Khorasan Province, Iran. At the 2006 census, its population was 103, in 23 families.
