= Black Rock Peak =

Hill in Hangzhou, China

The Black Rock Peak (Traditional Chinese: 烏石峰; Simplified Chinese: 乌石峰), or Wushi Peak, is a hill in Hangzhou, Zhejiang Province, People's Republic of China. It faces the Yuquan Campus of Zhejiang University.

== Introduction ==
The peak has an altitude of only 125 meters, which is relatively high in urban Hangzhou. Because its rocks are nearly black (seen from far away), people gave this name to the hill. It's also called the Camel Peak by some Hongzhou elders, probably due to its shape.

On the huge rocks, people can see the panoramic West Lake, so it's an ideal site for viewing West Lake's landscapes. The hill has several historic sites including the Xiangjie (香界).

About 30 meters southwest of Black Rock Peak, lies one of the most famous parks in Hangzhou: the Quyuan-Fenghe (曲院風荷, literal translation: 'zigzagged garden with lotus blooms in wind').
