= Black Rock (Heard Island) =

Rock formation in Heard Island, Australia

Black Rock (53°1′S 73°34′E) is a small, dark rock lying immediately northwest of Morgan Island and 0.2 nautical miles (0.4 km) north of Heard Island. The feature appears to be roughly shown on an 1860 sketch map prepared by Captain H.C. Chester, American sealer operating in this area during this period. The name, which is descriptive, appears to have been applied on charts about 1932, probably as a result of the 1929 British Australian New Zealand Antarctic Research Expedition (BANZARE) work under Mawson.
