= Blackrock, Pennsylvania =

Unincorporated area in Pennsylvania, US

Blackrock
- Unincorporated community
- Interactive map of Blackrock
- Coordinates: 39°43′18″N 076°51′40″W
- Country: United States
- State: Pennsylvania
- County: York
- Elevation: 785 ft (239 m)
- Time zone: UTC-5 (EST)
  - Summer (DST): UTC-4 (EDT)
- GNIS feature ID: 1169764

Blackrock is an unincorporated community in York County, Pennsylvania, United States. Blackrock is located near the Mason–Dixon line, approximately one mile northwest of the town of Lineboro.
