= Blackstone, Pennsylvania =

Unincorporated community in Pennsylvania, US

- Unincorporated community
- Location within Pennsylvania
- Coordinates: 40°39′43″N 79°39′07″W
- Country: United States
- State: Pennsylvania
- County: Westmoreland
- Elevation: 1,001 ft (305 m)
- Time zone: UTC-5 (Eastern (EST))
  - Summer (DST): UTC-4 (EDT)
- Area code: 724
- GNIS feature ID: 1203114

Blackstone is an unincorporated community in Westmoreland County, Pennsylvania, United States.
