= Black Rocks (Mercury Islands) =

Islands in New Zealand

Geography
- Coordinates: 36.697861°S 175.8655°E

Administration
- New Zealand
- Region: Waikato

Demographics
- Population: uninhabited

The Black Rocks are a group of small islands in Waikato, New Zealand. They are south of the Mercury Islands, off the east coast of the Coromandel Peninsula.

== See also ==
- List of islands of New Zealand
