= Black Rock (novel) =

1996 novel by Steve Harris

Black Rock is a novel by Steve Harris published by Victor Gollancz in 1996.

== Plot summary ==
Black Rock is a novel which features a haunted house near Tintagel on the north coast of Cornwall.

== Reception ==
Jonathan Palmer reviewed Black Rock for Arcane magazine, rating it a 7 out of 10 overall. Palmer comments that "Black Rock is not a masterpiece; the characters flatten out as the plot develops and I lost interest in their fate; but it is a good book. When Steve Harris masters combining good plots with convincing characterisation, he'll write some better books. He just hasn't quite perfected his craft yet."

== Reviews ==
- Review by Sebastian Phillips (1996) in Vector 190
