= Blackstones =

Blackstones or Blackstone's may refer to:

- The Blackstones, UK-based reggae vocal trio active since the mid-1970s
- Blackstones F.C., non-league football club from Stamford, England
- Blackstone's Commentaries, Commentaries on the Laws of England
- Blackstone's Department Store, Los Angeles
- Blackstone's formulation, a principle of criminal law
- Blackstone & Co, a diesel engine and agricultural engineering company in Stamford, Lincolnshire, that became Mirrlees Blackstone
- Black Stones, short for Almighty Black P. Stone Nation, a Chicago gang, also known as Blackstone Rangers
- Black Stones, a band in the manga series Nana

== See also ==
- Black Rock (disambiguation)
- Blackstone (disambiguation)
