= Black Rocks (Kauri Bay) =

Island in New Zealand

Geography
- Coordinates: 35.378301°S 174.363291°E

Administration
- New Zealand
- Region: Northland

Demographics
- Population: uninhabited

Black Rocks is an island in the Kauri Bay of Northland, New Zealand.

== See also ==
- List of islands of New Zealand
