= Black Rock Halt railway station =

Railway station located in Gwynedd

Black Rock Halt

General information
- Location: Between Criccieth and Porthmadog, Gwynedd; Wales
- Coordinates: 52.91688°N 4.20366°W
- Grid reference: SH 519 378
- Platforms: 1

Other information
- Status: Disused

History
- Original company: Great Western Railway
- Post-grouping: Great Western Railway

Key dates
- 9 July 1923: Opened
- 13 August 1976: Services withdrawn
- 27 June 1977: Officially closed
Location

Black Rock Halt was a railway station in Gwynedd, located between Criccieth and Porthmadog on the former Aberystwith and Welsh Coast Railway. It served the popular beach at Black Rock Sands beyond the headland it is named after.

== History ==
The halt, which could be accessed by a path from the foot of the Black Rock (Welsh: Graig Ddu), consisted of a 100-foot-long (30 m) wooden platform and was opened on 9 July 1923 by the Great Western Railway, which saw itself as the 'holiday line'. It closed on safety grounds in August 1976, but was not officially closed until 27 June 1977. No trace of the wooden platform now remains.

== The site today ==
Trains on the Cambrian Line pass the site of the former station, which is just about discernible on modern aerial photography. The site of the halt can be seen from the Wales Coast Path.

== Sources ==
- Butt, R. V. J. (October 1995). The Directory of Railway Stations: details every public and private passenger station, halt, platform and stopping place, past and present (1st ed.). Sparkford: Patrick Stephens Ltd. ISBN 978-1-85260-508-7. OCLC 60251199. OL 11956311M.
- Jowett, Alan (March 1989). Jowett's Railway Atlas of Great Britain and Ireland: From Pre-Grouping to the Present Day (1st ed.). Sparkford: Patrick Stephens Ltd. ISBN 978-1-85260-086-0. OCLC 22311137.
- Jowett, Alan (2000). Jowett's Nationalised Railway Atlas (1st ed.). Penryn, Cornwall: Atlantic Transport Publishers. ISBN 978-0-906899-99-1. OCLC 228266687.
- Mitchell, Vic; Smith, Keith (2010). Bangor to Portmadoc: Including Three Llanberis Lines (Country Railway Routes). Midhurst: Middleton Press. ISBN 978-1-906008-72-7.

Preceding station	Historical railways	Following station
Criccieth; Line and station open	Great Western Railway; Aberystwith and Welsh Coast Railway	Porthmadog; Line and station open
