= School of Aeronautics and Astronautics, Zhejiang University =

School of Aeronautics and Astronautics (SAA) of Zhejiang University (Traditional Chinese: 浙江大學航空航天學院, Simplified Chinese: 浙江大学航空航天学院), is one of the university schools/colleges primarily focuses on space technology in the People's Republic of China.

== Introduction ==
The history of this school can be traced back to 1936. In 1936, Zhejiang University founded a sub-department about aeronautical engineering under the Department of Mechanical Engineering.

1945, the physicist and educator Mr. FAN Xuqi (范绪箕) further foundered the Department of Aeronautical Engineering, and was pointed to the first director of the department.

1952, the Adjustment of University Colleges & Departments (中國高校院系調整/中国高校院系调整) started, Mr. Fan was transferred to the newly established East China Aeronautical College (華東航空學院/华东航空学院), the Zhejiang University Department of Aeronautical Engineering was dissociated from the Zhejiang University and joined into the other universities and colleges. 1956, Fan became the vice-president of the Nanjing Aeronautical College (南京航空學院/南京航空学院), and in 1972, he was further transferred into Shanghai Jiao Tong University (SJTU), and then became the president of SJTU.

At the beginning of 2007, the Zhejaing University School (instead of a department previously) of Aeronautics and Astronautics was refounded.

== Present ==
The school has three academicians from CAS/CAE. Current director is Mr.Shen Rongjun, who is an academician from CAE, and the Deputy Commander-in-Chief of the Chinese Manned Spaceflight Program. Every year, about 50 undergraduate and 50 postgraduate students join into the school.
