= Porthmadog railway station (Welsh Highland Heritage Railway) =

Heritage railway station in Gwynedd, Wales

Porthmadog
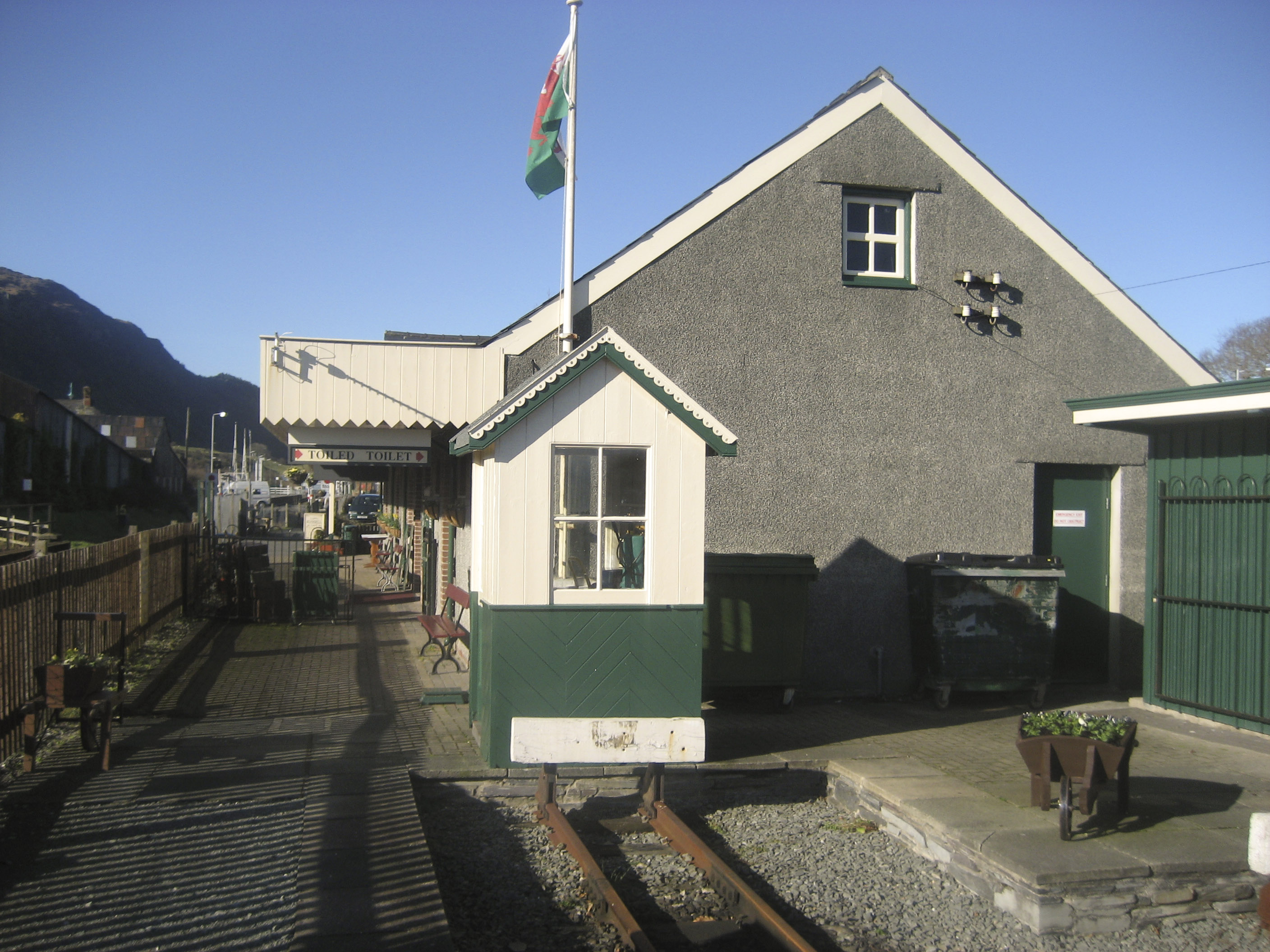
- The station building The WHHR station building at Porthmadog.

General information
- Location: Porthmadog, Gwynedd. Wales
- Coordinates: 52.93085°N 4.13265°W
- Grid reference: SH567392
- System: Station on heritage railway
- Owner: WHR Ltd
- Manager: Welsh Highland Heritage Railway
- Platforms: 1

History
- Opened: 1980
Location

Porthmadog (WHHR) railway station is the southern terminus of the Welsh Highland Heritage Railway and serves the western end of the town of Porthmadog, in Gwynedd, Wales. It is situated opposite to Porthmadog station on the National Rail network. The station was opened on 2 August 1980.

== History ==
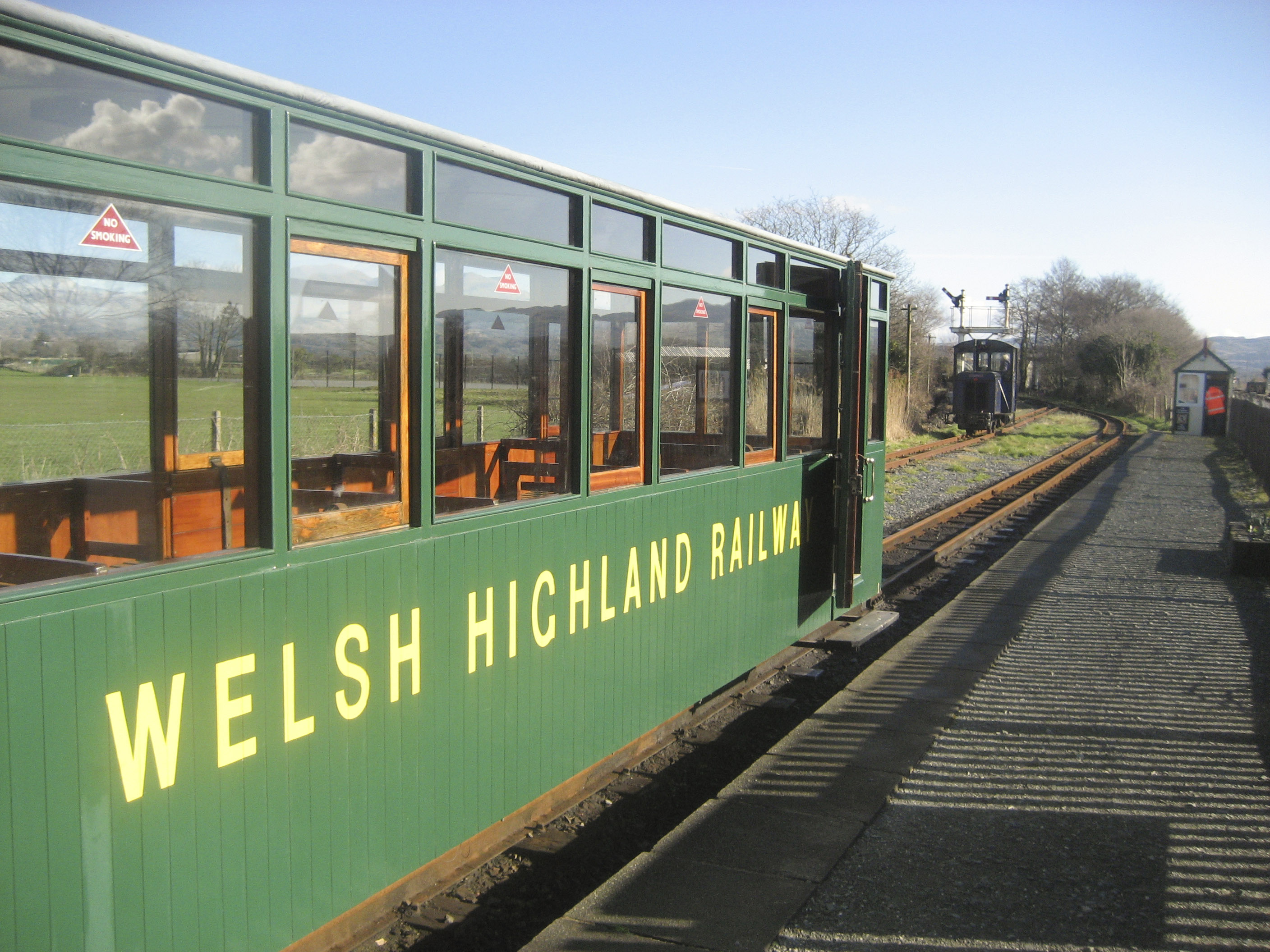
Running round at Porthmadog station

Several organisations held competing claims to the Welsh Highland Railway's assets through lengthy legal disputes of the 1970s; they were eventually resolved in favour of the Ffestiniog Railway Trust for the main Caernarfon–Portmadog route. The WHHR retained the southern Porthmadog section and the locomotive Russell, which it has preserved and restored as the tangible connection to the original WHR's history.

On its opening in August 1980, the station was a simple wooden shed situated in the car park. In January 1986, a portable building was installed at the end of the platforms for use as a waiting room and café.

In 1990, a permanent station building was built between the café and the buffer stops. Initially it replaced the wooden shed and was subsequently extended to the east in 1993 to double the size of the shop.

The old café was demolished in 1998 and the station building was extended over its site; it was built by volunteers and is a single-storey building, with a pitched roof and canopy.

Civils Week is a long-established annual work party on the WHR. In 1998, the 50lb run round point was replaced with a 75lb full lead allowing a short siding to be constructed adjacent to the headshunt. This siding is now used to store various historic wagons, considerably enhancing the period feel of the station. The run round loop was relaid in 75lb rail the same week.

== Services ==
Services only run on specific days of the year, mostly in the summer for the tourist trade. Operating dates are specified when there is a steam or diesel service.

A short train ride takes passengers in historic narrow-gauge railway carriages out to and back from Pen-y-Mount Junction station; on the return journey, a stop of around half an hour is provided to explore the railway heritage centre and museum.

Preceding station	Heritage railways	Following station
Terminus	Welsh Highland Heritage Railway	Gelert's Farm Halt towards Pen-y-Mount Junction
Change for the Ffestiniog and Welsh Highland Railways at Porthmadog Harbour
National Rail
Interchange with Porthmadog on the Cambrian Line

== See also ==
- Porthmadog station
- Porthmadog Harbour station.
