= Blackstone Avenue =

Major roadway arterial in Fresno, California

- Maintained by: Fresno, California
- South end: Stanislaus and O Streets
- Major junctions: SR 180
- North end: SR 41 / Friant Road

Blackstone Avenue is a major roadway arterial in Fresno, California, United States, running from Stanislaus and O Streets near Downtown to Highway 41 northeastern part of the city. This street is the location of a number of historic structures and is also the locus of a considerable concentration of retail commercial land usage. The campus of the Fresno City College straddles Blackstone Avenue in the vicinity of McKinley Avenue.

== History ==
In the late 1880s residents jokingly referred to the street as Blackstone after the English legal scholar William Blackstone, due to the number of lawyers living there.

The local history may be best recorded by some of the old surviving homes on Blackstone Avenue which are in the Register of National Historic Places, including the Ella Hoxie Home (251 N. Blackstone Avenue); Brix Home (313 N. Blackstone Avenue); Griffen Home (319 N. Blackstone Avenue); Hines Home (333 N. Blackstone Avenue). Earth Metrics Inc. performed an analysis of historic aerial photographs in the Blackstone Avenue vicinity. In 1946, the area contained many residences on large lots. The photographs observed indicate that many of these large lots included row crops. Surrounding lands at that time were predominantly used for agriculture, with orchards lining much of the western side of Blackstone Avenue. A mixture of row crops, vacant fields, orchards, and scattered residences made up much of the landscape on the eastern side of Blackstone Avenue.

The aerial photographs taken in 1962 indicate that land use in the subject site vicinity showed significant change between 1946 and 1962. Urbanization occurred in the Blackstone Avenue vicinity during this period. Orchards and row crops had been largely replaced by commercial and residential structures by 1962.

== Geology ==
The elevation of Blackstone Avenue is approximately 330 feet (100 m) above mean sea level. The underlying sediments of the Blackstone Avenue area are a heterogeneous mix of generally poorly sorted clay, silt, sand and gravel.
