= Black Rock, Cumberland County =

Community in Nova Scotia, Canada

Coordinates: 45°22′39″N 64°25′02″W

Black Rock in Nova Scotia

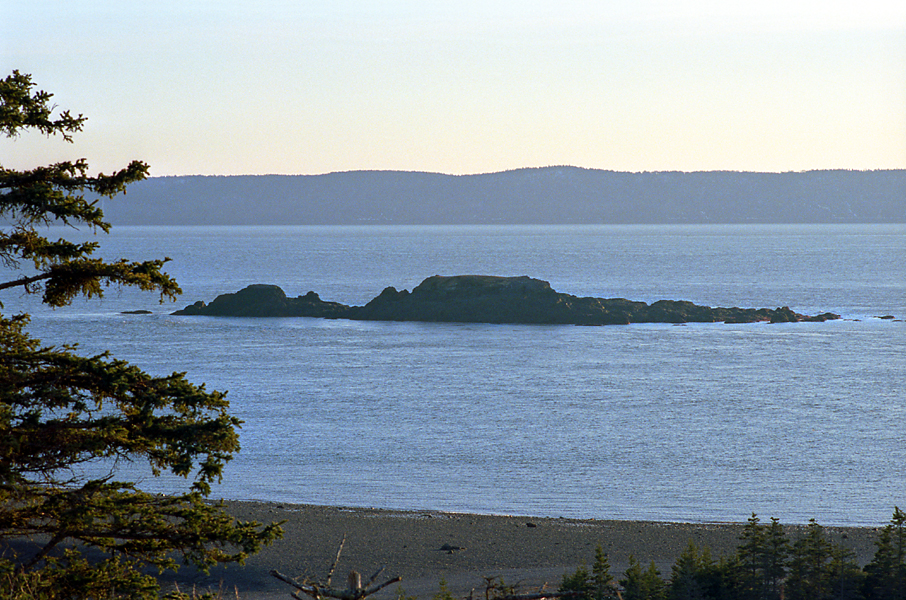
Black Rock granite formation

Black Rock is a community in the Canadian province of Nova Scotia, located in Cumberland County. It is located approximately 10 kilometres west of Parrsboro.
