= Clifton, Nova Scotia =

Clifton
- Location within Nova Scotia
- Coordinates: 45°19′58″N 63°26′54″W
- Country: Canada
- Province: Nova Scotia
- County: Colchester

Clifton is an unincorporated community in the Canadian province of Nova Scotia, located in Colchester County.

In 1965, an oil storage facility for the Irving Oil company was built in Clifton.

== Bibliography ==
- Burrows, Mildred Pulsifer (1985). A history of Clifton and Old Barns in Colchester County. Truro, Nova Scotia: Colchester Historical Museum. OCLC 16179818.
