= Black Rock, Kings County =

Community in Nova Scotia, Canada

Coordinates: 45°9′57.83″N 64°45′48.15″W

Black Rock in Nova Scotia

Black Rock is a community in the Canadian province of Nova Scotia, located in Kings County.

It contains a lighthouse (Black Rock Lighthouse) which was built in 1848. In 1967, the wooden, square lighthouse was replaced by a 10.4-meter-tall (34 ft) white fiberglass tower.
