= Porthmadog =

Town in Gwynedd, Wales

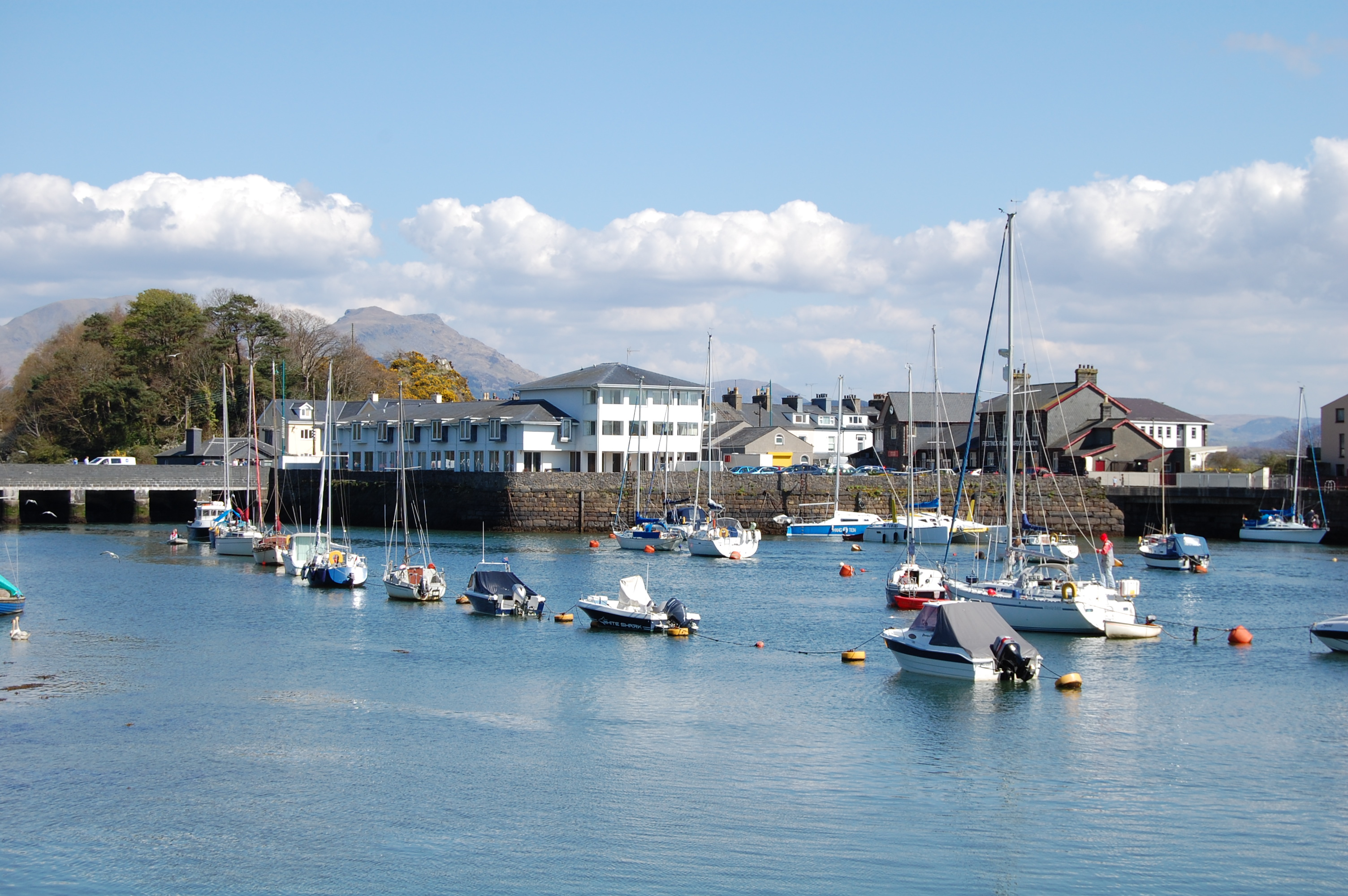
- Porthmadog Harbour was developed to export slate

- Location within Gwynedd
- Area: 16.18 km^{2} (6.25 sq mi)
- Population: 4,185 (2011)
  - Density: 259/km^{2} (670/sq mi)
- OS grid reference: SH565385
- Community: Porthmadog
- Principal area: Gwynedd
- Preserved county: Gwynedd
- Country: Wales
- Sovereign state: United Kingdom
- Post town: PORTHMADOG
- Postcode district: LL49
- Dialling code: 01766
- Police: North Wales
- Fire: North Wales
- Ambulance: Welsh
- UK Parliament: Dwyfor Meirionnydd
- Senedd Cymru – Welsh Parliament: Gwynedd Maldwyn
- List of places UK Wales Gwynedd 52.927°N 4.132°W Map of the community

Porthmadog (Welsh: [pɔrθˈmadɔɡ]), originally Portmadoc until 1972 and known locally as Port, is a coastal town and community in the Eifionydd area of Gwynedd, Wales. It was formerly part of the historic county of Caernarfonshire and includes nearby Borth-y-Gest, Morfa Bychan and Tremadog. It lies 5 miles (8 km) east of Criccieth, 11 miles (18 km) south-west of Blaenau Ffestiniog, 25 miles (40 km) north of Dolgellau and 20 miles (32 km) south of Caernarfon. The community population was 4,185 in the 2011 census and 4,134 in 2019. It grew in the 19th century as a port for local slate but, as trade declined, it continued as a shopping and tourism centre, given its proximity to Snowdonia National Park and the Ffestiniog Railway. The 1987 National Eisteddfod was held there.

== Toponymy ==
The name Porthmadog derives from its English spelling, Portmadoc, the official name until 1972. This was a conjunction of Port and Madocks, although some believe it is named after a folklore character, Madog ab Owain Gwynedd, whose name appears also in Ynys Fadog ('Madog Island').

The earliest references to Port Madoc are from the 1820s in reference to shipping, well before the opening of the Ffestiniog Railway and the town's later growth. The name first appeared on an Ordnance Survey map in 1838.

== History ==
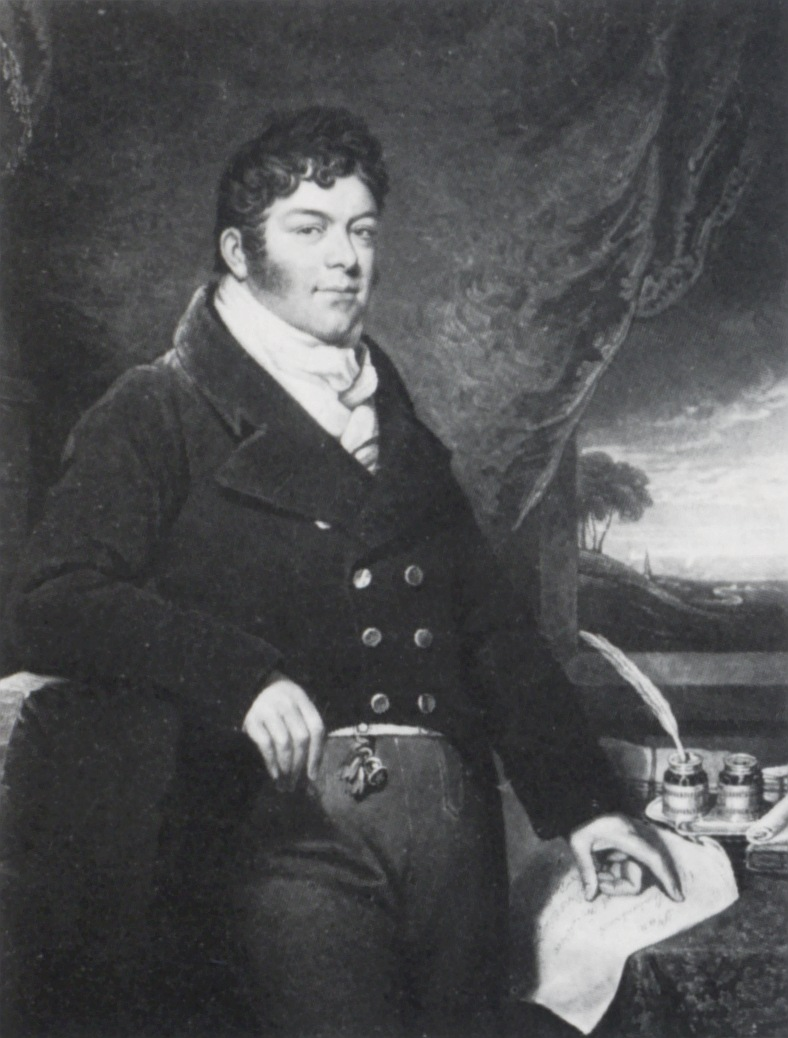
William Madocks built a sea wall, the Cob, to reclaim Traeth Mawr for agriculture

Porthmadog came about after William Madocks built a sea wall, the Cob, in 1808–11 to reclaim much of Traeth Mawr from the sea for farming use. Diversion of the afon Glaslyn caused it to scour out a new natural harbour deep enough for small ocean-going sailing ships and the first public wharves appeared in 1825. Quarry companies followed, with wharves along the shore almost to Borth-y-Gest, while slate was carted from Ffestiniog down to quays along the Afon Dwyryd, then boated to Porthmadog for transfer to seagoing vessels.

In the later 19th century, Porthmadog flourished as a port, its population rising from 885 in 1821 to over 3,000 by 1861. The rapidly growing cities of England needed high-quality roofing slate, which was brought to the new port by tramway from quarries in Ffestiniog and Llanfrothen. The Ffestiniog Railway opened in 1836, followed by the Gorseddau Tramway in 1856 and the Croesor Tramway in 1864. By 1873, over 116,000 tons (117,800 t) were exported through Porthmadog in over a thousand ships. Several shipbuilders were active at this time. They were known particularly for their three-masted schooners called Western Ocean Yachts, the last of which was launched in 1913.

By 1841, the trackway across the reclaimed land had been straightened. It would develop into Stryd Fawr, the main commercial street of the town, with a range of shops and public houses and a post office, but the open green retained. A mineral railway to Tremadog ran along what would become Heol Madog. To the north was an industrial area of foundries, timber saw mills, slate works, a flour mill, a soda-pop plant and gasworks.

Porthmadog's role as a commercial port, already reduced by the opening of the Aberystwith and Welsh Coast Railway in 1867, was effectively ended by the First World War, when the lucrative German market for slate collapsed. The 19th-century wharves survive, but the slate warehouses have been replaced by holiday apartments and the harbour is used by leisure yachts.

== Governance ==
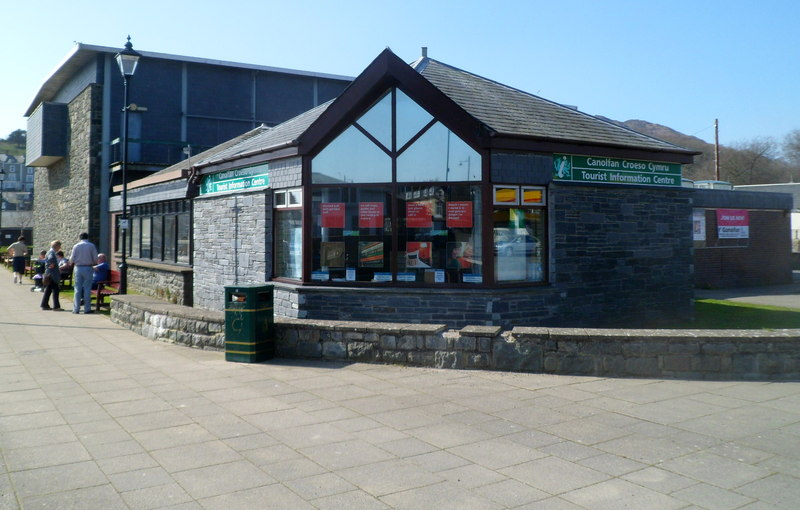
Tourist Information Centre and Y Ganolfan (Community Centre)

There are two tiers of local government covering Porthmadog, at community (town) and county level, with both councils using Welsh as their primary language: Cyngor Tref Porthmadog ('Porthmadog Town Council') and Cyngor Gwynedd ('Gwynedd Council'). The town council meets at Y Ganolfan, a community centre on High Street adjoining the harbour bridge. The building also incorporates the town's tourist information centre.

From 1950 to 2010, Porthmadog was part of the Westminster constituency of Caernarfon. In 2010, the town became part of the Dwyfor Meirionnydd constituency. In the Senedd, it formed part of the Dwyfor Meirionnydd constituency from 2007 to 2026, forming part of the electoral region of Mid and West Wales. Following the 2026 review of Senedd constituencies, the town was placed into the constituency of Gwynedd Maldwyn, represented by 4 MSes of Plaid Cymru and 2 of Reform UK.

=== Administrative history ===
The Porthmadog area historically formed part of the parish of Ynyscynhaiarn (or Ynyscynhaearn). The parish church was St Cynhaearn's Church, which stands in an isolated location 2.5 miles (4.0 km) west of Porthmadog. The parish was in two separate parts: an eastern part including the Porthmadog and Tremadog area, and a western part which included the parish church and the village of Pentrefelin. The small parish of Treflys separated the two parts of Ynyscynhaiarn parish. Ynyscynhaiarn formed part of the ancient commote of Eifionydd, which in 1284 was made part of the new county of Caernarfonshire under the Statute of Rhuddlan.

Following the development of Porthmadog and neighbouring Tremadog in the early 19th century, there was a need for more formal structures of local government. In 1858, the parish of Ynyscynhaiarn was made a local board district, governed by an elected local board. Such local board districts were reconstituted as urban districts under the Local Government Act 1894. In 1896, the western part of Ynyscynhaiarn, which was known as the township of Uwchyllyn, was transferred to the parish of Treflys, leaving the reduced parish and urban district of Ynyscynhaiarn just covering the eastern part of the old parish, which included Porthmadog and Tremadog.

In 1915, the county council changed the urban district's name from Ynyscynhaiarn to Portmadoc at the urban district council's request. In 1934, part of the area was transferred to Dolbenmaen and a smaller area was taken in from Treflys, which was abolished. The urban district council changed the official spelling of the name from Portmadoc to Porthmadog at a meeting on 9 May 1972.

Porthmadog Urban District was abolished in 1974 under the Local Government Act 1972. A community called Porthmadog was created instead, covering the area of the abolished urban district. District-level functions passed to Dwyfor District Council, which was in turn replaced in 1996 by Gwynedd Council.

== Geography ==
Porthmadog lies in Eifionydd, on the estuary of the afon Glaslyn, where it runs into Tremadog Bay. The estuary, filled with sediment deposited by rivers emptying from the melting glaciers at the end of the last ice age, is a haven for migrating birds. Oystercatchers, redshanks and curlews are common, as are summer flocks of sandwich terns. To the west looms Moel y Gest, rising 863 feet (263 m) above the town as a Marilyn.

=== Climate ===
The town's temperate maritime climate is influenced by the Gulf Stream. The nearest weather station is at Cwmystradllyn. The highest temperature recorded since 1993 was 35.3 °C (95.5 °F) on 19 July 2022 and the lowest was −11.5 °C (11.3 °F) on 6 January 2009.

Average temperatures and precipitation
Month	Average high (°C)	Average low (°C)	Average precipitation (cm)
January	7.0	2.5	18.13
February	7.6	2.2	15.38
March	9.3	3.1	14.50
April	11.9	4.5	11.64
May	14.9	7.6	11.34
June	17.0	10.0	13.59
July	18.2	12.2	16.02
August	18.8	11.8	16.52
September	16.3	9.5	17.32
October	13.4	7.4	20.68
November	10.2	4.7	21.91
December	7.9	2.6	21.80

Climate data for Cwmystradllyn 205m amsl (1991-2020)
Month	Jan	Feb	Mar	Apr	May	Jun	Jul	Aug	Sep	Oct	Nov	Dec	Year
Mean daily maximum °C (°F)	7.0 (44.6)	7.6 (45.7)	9.3 (48.7)	11.9 (53.4)	14.9 (58.8)	17.0 (62.6)	18.2 (64.8)	18.8 (65.8)	16.3 (61.3)	13.4 (56.1)	10.2 (50.4)	7.9 (46.2)	12.7 (54.9)
Daily mean °C (°F)	4.8 (40.6)	4.9 (40.8)	6.2 (43.2)	8.2 (46.8)	11.3 (52.3)	13.5 (56.3)	15.2 (59.4)	15.3 (59.5)	12.9 (55.2)	10.4 (50.7)	7.4 (45.3)	5.3 (41.5)	9.6 (49.3)
Mean daily minimum °C (°F)	2.5 (36.5)	2.2 (36.0)	3.1 (37.6)	4.5 (40.1)	7.6 (45.7)	10.0 (50.0)	12.2 (54.0)	11.8 (53.2)	9.5 (49.1)	7.4 (45.3)	4.7 (40.5)	2.6 (36.7)	6.5 (43.7)
Average precipitation mm (inches)	181.3 (7.14)	153.8 (6.06)	145.1 (5.71)	116.4 (4.58)	113.4 (4.46)	135.9 (5.35)	160.2 (6.31)	165.2 (6.50)	173.2 (6.82)	206.8 (8.14)	219.1 (8.63)	218.0 (8.58)	1,988.4 (78.28)
Average precipitation days (≥ 1.0 mm)	18.7	16.6	15.8	14.6	13.1	13.3	15.2	16.5	15.6	18.2	20.6	20.3	198.6
Mean monthly sunshine hours	42.5	63.3	106.9	158.9	183.5	166.7	163.2	143.7	106.2	78.5	48.8	36.6	1,298.7
Source: Met Office

=== Villages ===
==== Borth-y-Gest ====
Borth-y-Gest, which lies 1 mile (1.6 km) south of Porthmadog, is built in a shallow bowl sweeping down to a sheltered bay, with hidden sandy coves and cliffs. Ships were built here before Porthmadog was established and houses, still known as "pilot houses", were erected at the mouth of the harbour so that pilots could watch for ships needing them. The village and its rows of Victorian houses have retained much of its atmosphere and charm. Stryd Mersey leads up from the bay, flanked by terraced cottages.

Before Porthmadog was developed, this was the starting point of a major crossing over the wide and dangerous Glaslyn estuary. Locals earned money by guiding travellers across the treacherous sands of Traeth Mawr to Harlech.

Parc y Borth is a local nature reserve in deciduous woodland dominated by ancient Welsh oaks. Green woodpeckers, tawny owls and pied flycatchers can be seen among the branches.

On the shore is another nature reserve, Pen y Banc, a mixture of coastal rocks, secluded sandy coves and mixed woodland. Established in 1996, it is a good spot to see wading birds and its beaches attract many visitors. The mild climate results in a wide variety of vegetation, from gorse and heather through to blackthorn, crab apple and birch.

==== Morfa Bychan ====
Morfa Bychan, 2.1 miles (3.4 km) south-west of Porthmadog, has a wide beach, Black Rock Sands (Welsh: Traeth Morfa Bychan), with Graig Ddu, a rocky headland, at its western end. At low tide, rock pools and caverns are exposed. The beach is popular with windsurfers, and is unusual in allowing vehicles onto the sands.

Sand dunes behind the beach form part of Morfa Bychan and Greenacres Nature Reserve. Standing in a field is Cist Cerrig, a dolmen, near which are rocks containing cup marks.

In 1996, there were protests backed by Cymdeithas yr Iaith Gymraeg against the building of 800 houses at Morfa Bychan. These followed a High Court decision that planning permission granted in 1964 remained valid. The owners of the site later entered a legal agreement with Cyngor Gwynedd, allowing a caravan site and nature reserve to be placed on part of the site, which ensured that the 1964 permit could no longer be implemented. The council also settled a compensation claim by developers for the way the matter had been handled.

==== Tremadog ====
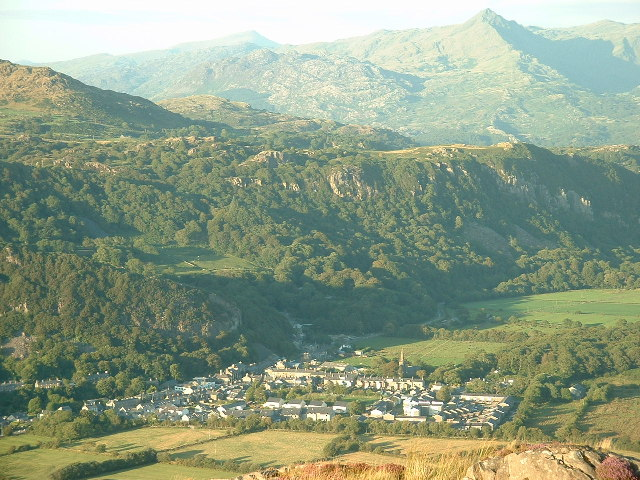
Tremadog is a planned settlement built by William Madocks on land reclaimed from Traeth Mawr

Tremadog, a planned settlement 0.9 miles (1.4 km) north of Porthmadog, was built on land reclaimed from Traeth Mawr by William Madocks. In 1805, the first cottages appeared in what Madocks called Pentre Gwaelod ("Bottom Village"), which was designed to give an impression of a borough, with a central town hall and dance room. Industry included in the plan consisted of a manufactory, loomery, fulling mill and corn mill; all were worked by water power.

To the north is Tan-yr-Allt, a property bought by Madocks for the first Regency house in Gwynedd. The sloping garden consists mainly of lawns planted with trees and shrubs. It includes a memorial to Percy Bysshe Shelley.

=== Demography ===
At the 2001 census, Porthmadog had a population of 4,187, of whom 18.2% were below the age of 16 and 23.6% were over 65 years of age; 69.5% of households were in owner-occupied accommodation and 24.6% were renting. Holiday homes accounted for 12.5% of dwellings.

Population trends
Year	1801	1811	1821	1831	1841	1851	1861	1871	1881
Population	525	889	885	1,075	1,888	2,347	3,138	4,367	5,506
Year	1891	1901	1911	1921	1931	1939	1951	1961	2001
Population	5,224	4,883	4,445	4,184	3,986	4,618	4,061	3,960	4,187
Year	2011	2021							
Population	4,185	3,970							

According to the 2011 census, 71% of residents were born in Wales and 24.5% in England.

== Economy ==
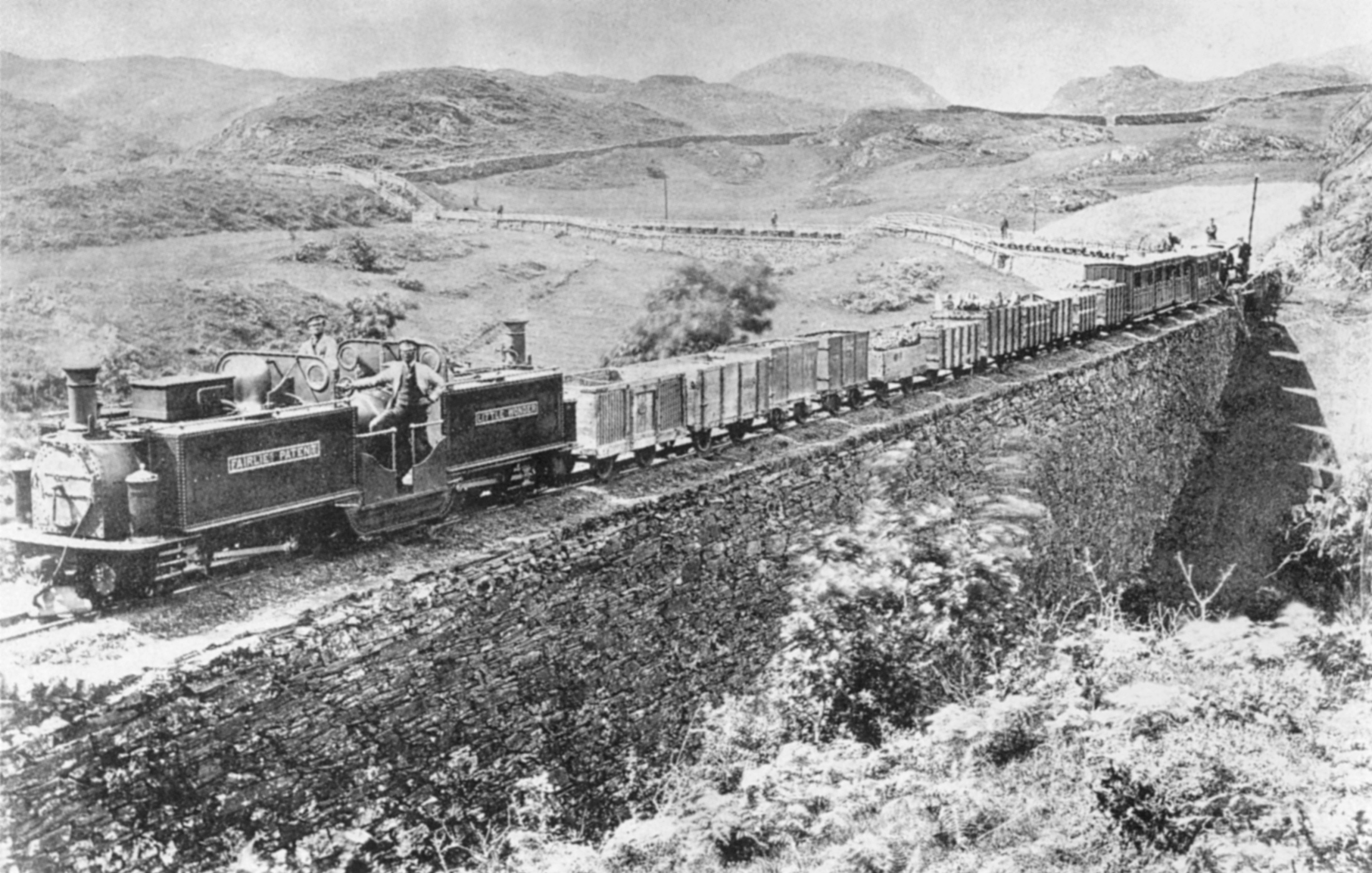
The Ffestiniog Railway was built to transport slate from Blaenau Ffestiniog to the new port at Porthmadog

At the 2001 census, 44.3% of the working-age population were employed, 11.5% self-employed, 5.3% unemployed and 20.4% retired. Of the employed, 33.0% worked in the distribution, hotel and catering trades and 23.5% in public administration, education and health.

Porthmadog expanded rapidly as a slate-exporting port. Slate had already reached King's Lynn and the Port of Wisbech by 1830, and was shipped further inland in barges for use in late Georgian era development. Welsh slate was also in high demand as a construction material in the English industrial cities and transported to the new port by horse-drawn tramways. The Ffestiniog Railway, opened in 1836 as a gravity railway with horses hauling empty slate waggons back up to the quarries, was converted to steam operation in 1863; trains ran straight onto the wharves. By 1873, 116,000 tons (117,800 t) of slate were being shipped out of Porthmadog and other trade developed. The Carnarvonshire and Merionethshire Steamship Company formed in 1864 purchased the Rebecca to carry stores from Liverpool to supply the growing town.

The First World War marked the end of Porthmadog's exports. No new ships were built, several were sunk by enemy action, and most of the survivors were sold. The arrival at Blaenau Ffestiniog of the LNWR in 1879 and, in 1883, the GWR brought a steady decline in the slate traffic carried by the Festiniog Railway and Portmadoc shipping. Some slate had been carried via the Festiniog Railway, the Croesor and Portmadoc Railway and the Cambrian Railways after the latter's line had been opened between Barmouth and Pwllheli in 1867; this traffic was diverted to the exchange yard established between the Festiniog Railway and the Cambrian Railways at Minffordd in 1872. By 1925, less than 5% of Ffestiniog's slate output went out by sea. The final load of slate delivered by rail left by sea from Porthmadog in 1946; two months later, the railway ceased commercial operations.

Before construction of the Cob in 1812, ships had been built at locations round Traeth Mawr. As the town developed, several shipbuilders from the Meirionnydd side moved to the new port, building brigs, schooners, barquentines and brigantines. After the arrival of the railway, there was a reduction in trade, but a new type of ship, the Western Ocean Yacht, was developed for the salt cod industry in Newfoundland and Labrador. Shipbuilding came to an end in 1913; the last vessel built was the Gestiana, which was lost on its maiden voyage.

In the 19th-century, Porthmadog had at least three iron foundries. The Glaslyn Foundry opened in 1848, and the Union Iron Works in 1869. The Britannia Foundry, opposite Harbour station, appeared in 1851 and grew rapidly with the town's prosperity. It supplied slate-working machinery and railway equipment to all but one of the slate quarries operating in England and Wales. A lucrative sideline was the production of drains and manhole covers for Caernarfonshire's roads.

== Landmarks ==
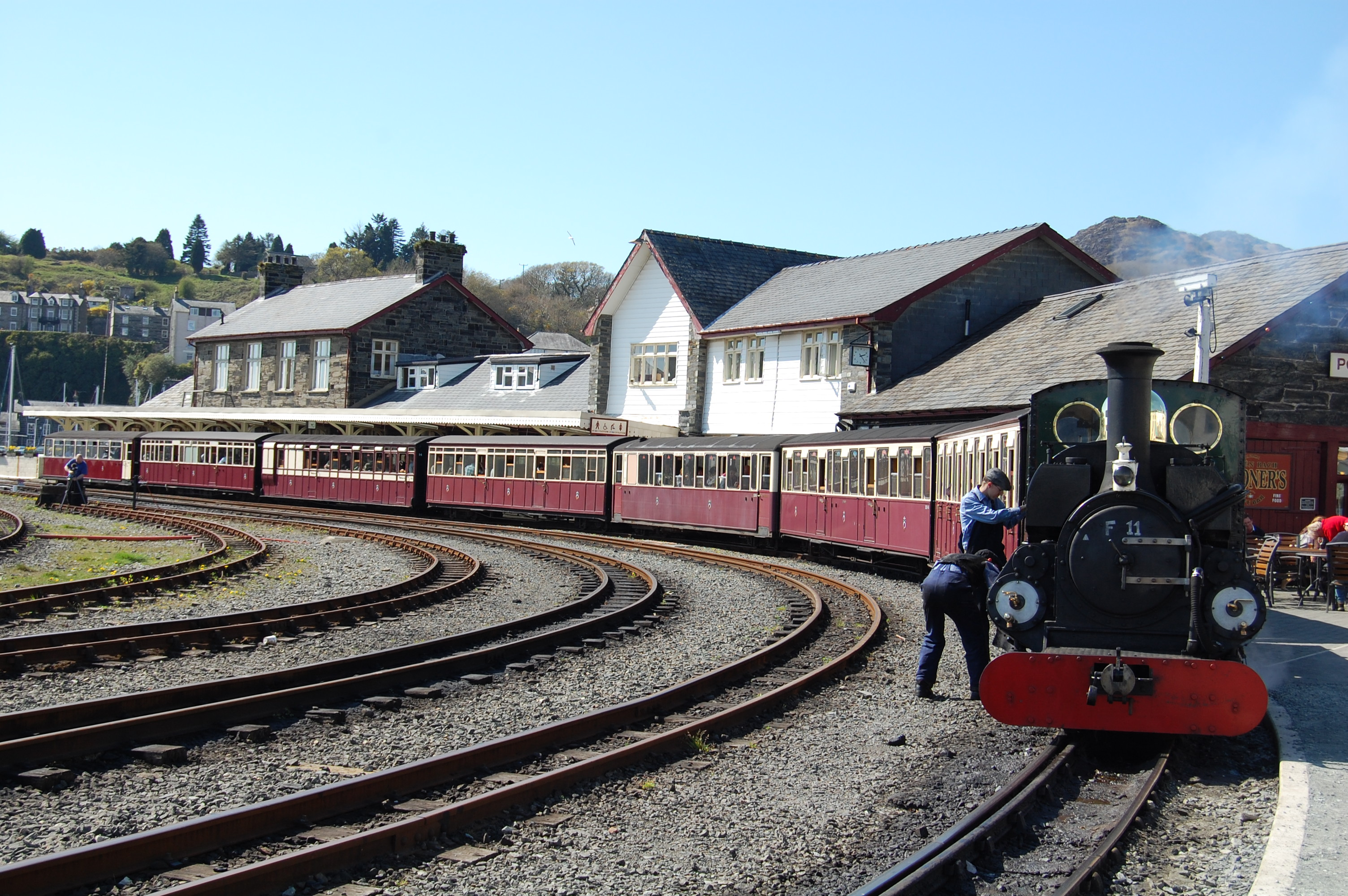
The Ffestiniog Railway is a popular tourist attraction, carrying visitors through mountain scenery to Blaenau Ffestiniog

The Cob is a prominent embankment built across the Glaslyn estuary in 1811 by William Madocks to reclaim land at Traeth Mawr for agriculture. It opened with a four-day feast and Eisteddfod celebrating the roadway connecting Caernarfonshire to Meirionnydd, which figured in Madocks' plans for a road from London to his proposed port at Porthdinllaen. Three weeks later, the embankment was breached by high tides and Madocks's supporters had to drum up money and men from all Caernarfonshire to repair the breach and strengthen the whole embankment. By 1814, it was open again, but Madocks's finances were in ruins. By 1836, the Ffestiniog Railway had opened its line across the embankment. It then become the main route for Ffestiniog slate to reach the new port at Porthmadog. In 1927, the Cob was breached again and took several months to repair. In 2012, 284 yards (260 m) of the embankment were widened on the seaward side of the Porthmadog end to allow a second platform to be added to the Ffestiniog Railway's Harbour station.

The former tollhouse at the north-western end of the Cob has slate-clad walls. It is one of few buildings to retain the interlocking slate ridge-tiles devised by Moses Kellow, manager of Croesor Quarry. The toll was abolished in 2003, when the Welsh Assembly Government bought the Cob.

Pen Cei, to the west of the harbour, was a centre of the harbour's commercial activities. Boats were built and repaired. There were slate wharves for each quarry company with tracks connecting to the railway. Bron Guallt, built in 1895, was the Oakeley Quarry shipping agent's house. Grisiau Mawr ("Big Steps") connected the quay to Garth and houses were built for the ship owners and sea captains. A School of Navigation was also built.

Melin Yr Wyddfa ("Snowdon Mill") on Heol Y Wyddfa is a former flour mill built in 1862. A scheme of renovation and conversion to luxury flats began there, but has yet to reach completion.

The Welsh Highland Heritage Railway, not to be confused with the Welsh Highland Railway, is a 0.75 m (0.0 km) line. It includes an award-winning miniature railway, a heritage centre, a shop and a cafe.

Kerfoots, in a Victorian building on Stryd Fawr, is a small department store founded in 1874. It contains a unique spiral staircase, chandeliers and slender cast-iron columns to support the upper floors. The Millennium Dome, constructed by local craftsmen in 1999 to mark the store's 125th anniversary, is made of stained glass depicting scenes from Porthmadog in 1874.

The Royal Sportsman Hotel (Welsh: Gwesty'r Heliwr) on Stryd Fawr was built in 1862, as a staging post on the turnpike road to Porthdinllaen. The arrival of the railway five years later brought rising numbers of tourists; the hotel soon became famous for its liveried carriage and horses to take guests to local sightseeing spots. The building is of Ffestiniog slate; the original stone and slate fireplaces remain.

The War Memorial stands on top of Ynys Galch, one of the former islands reclaimed from Traeth Mawr. Taking the form of a Celtic cross and standing 16 feet (4.9 m) high, it was fashioned from Trefor granite and unveiled "in memory of ninety-seven fallen war heroes of Madoc Vale" in 1922.

On Moel y Gest, a hill above the town, is an Iron Age stone-walled hill fort.

== Education ==
The town has three local primary schools:

- The bilingual Ysgol Eifion Wyn in Stryd Fawr, named after a local poet, Eliseus Williams (Eifion Wyn), has 204 pupils. It moved into new premises in 2003. There are units for children with special educational needs or with language difficulties. At the last school inspection by Estyn in 2004, 9% of pupils were entitled to free school meals and 72% came from homes where Welsh was the main spoken language.
- Ysgol Borth-y-Gest in Stryd Mersey, Borth-y-Gest, is the smallest of the three with 70 pupils. A 2009 report by Cyngor Gwynedd, Excellent Primary Education For Children In Gwynedd, set out the future for county primary schools. That of Ysgol Borth-y-Gest, built in 1880, had been in doubt. In 2006, at the last inspection by Estyn, 3% of pupils were entitled to free school meals and 20% came from homes where Welsh was the main spoken language.
- Ysgol y Gorlan, in Tremadog, has 122 pupils. When Estyn last inspected in 2008, 10% of pupils were entitled to free school meals and some 50% came from homes where Welsh was the main spoken language.

Ysgol Eifionydd in Stryd Fawr is a bilingual comprehensive school for ages 11–16, founded in about 1900. It has 484 pupils. At the last Estyn inspection in 2006, 8% of pupils were entitled to free school meals and Welsh was the main home spoken language of about 50%; 1% had an ethnic minority background.

== Transport ==
=== Railways ===
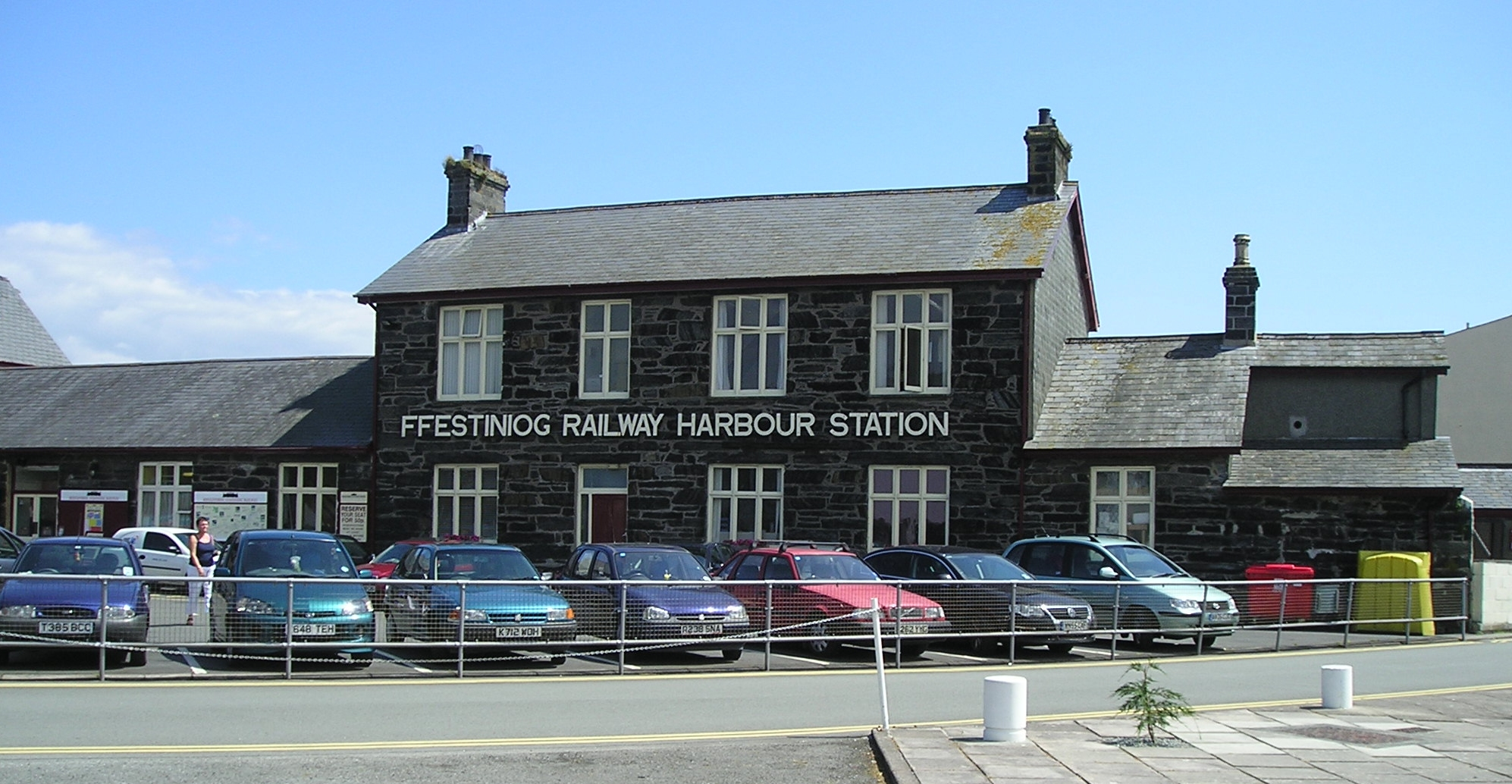
Porthmadog Harbour is the southern terminus of the heritage Ffestiniog and Welsh Highland Railways

The town has three railway stations:

- Porthmadog lies on the Cambrian Coast Line; Transport for Wales services connect Pwllheli with Machynlleth; services continue on to Shrewsbury, Wolverhampton and Birmingham International
- Porthmadog Harbour, at the southern end of Stryd Fawr, is a heritage railway station; it is the southern terminus for two preserved lines:
  - Ffestiniog Railway’s line from Blaenau Ffestiniog, since passenger services started in 1865
  - Welsh Highland Railway from Caernarfon, which was reopened in 2011
- Porthmadog WHHR is the southern terminus of the Welsh Highland Heritage Railway.

=== Buses ===
Bus routes are operated by Caelloi Motors, Gwynfor Coaches, Llew Jones, Lloyds Coaches and Taith Cymru. These connect the town with Aberystwyth, Bangor, Beddgelert, Blaenau Ffestiniog, Caernarfon, Criccieth, Dolgellau, Machynlleth, Morfa Bychan, Penrhyndeudraeth, Pen-y-Pass, Portmeirion, Pwllheli, Rhyd and Tremadog.

=== Roads ===
Porthmadog lies on three main roads:

- A487 trunk road between Fishguard and Bangor; the Porthmadog bypass was opened on 17 October 2011.
- A497 runs west through the southern Llŷn Peninsula to Criccieth and Pwllheli
- A498 runs north from Porthmadog to Beddgelert, for access to Snowdonia.

== Culture ==
Porthmadog chamberlains a mainly Welsh-speaking community: 74.9% of the inhabitants speak it regularly. The highest proportion of Welsh speakers is in the 10–14 age range, at 96.3%. Almost all community activities are held in Welsh. Porthmadog hosted the National Eisteddfod in 1987.

Y Ganolfan on Stryd Fawr, built in 1975, is a venue for concerts, exhibitions and other community events. It has also hosted televised wrestling matches.

Porthmadog Maritime Museum on Oakley Wharf occupies an old slate shed. It has displays of schooners built in the town and the men who sailed them.

== Sport ==
Porthmadog Football Club, founded in 1872, is one of the oldest in Wales; it plays at Y Traeth. In 1989/90, it topped the Welsh Alliance League and gained a place in the new Cymru Alliance. The club became an inaugural member of the League of Wales in 1992.

Clwb Rygbi Porthmadog, based at Clwb Chwaraeon Madog, plays rugby union in WRU Division 3 North organised by the Welsh Rugby Union, having gained promotion from the Gwynedd league in the 2011/12 season.

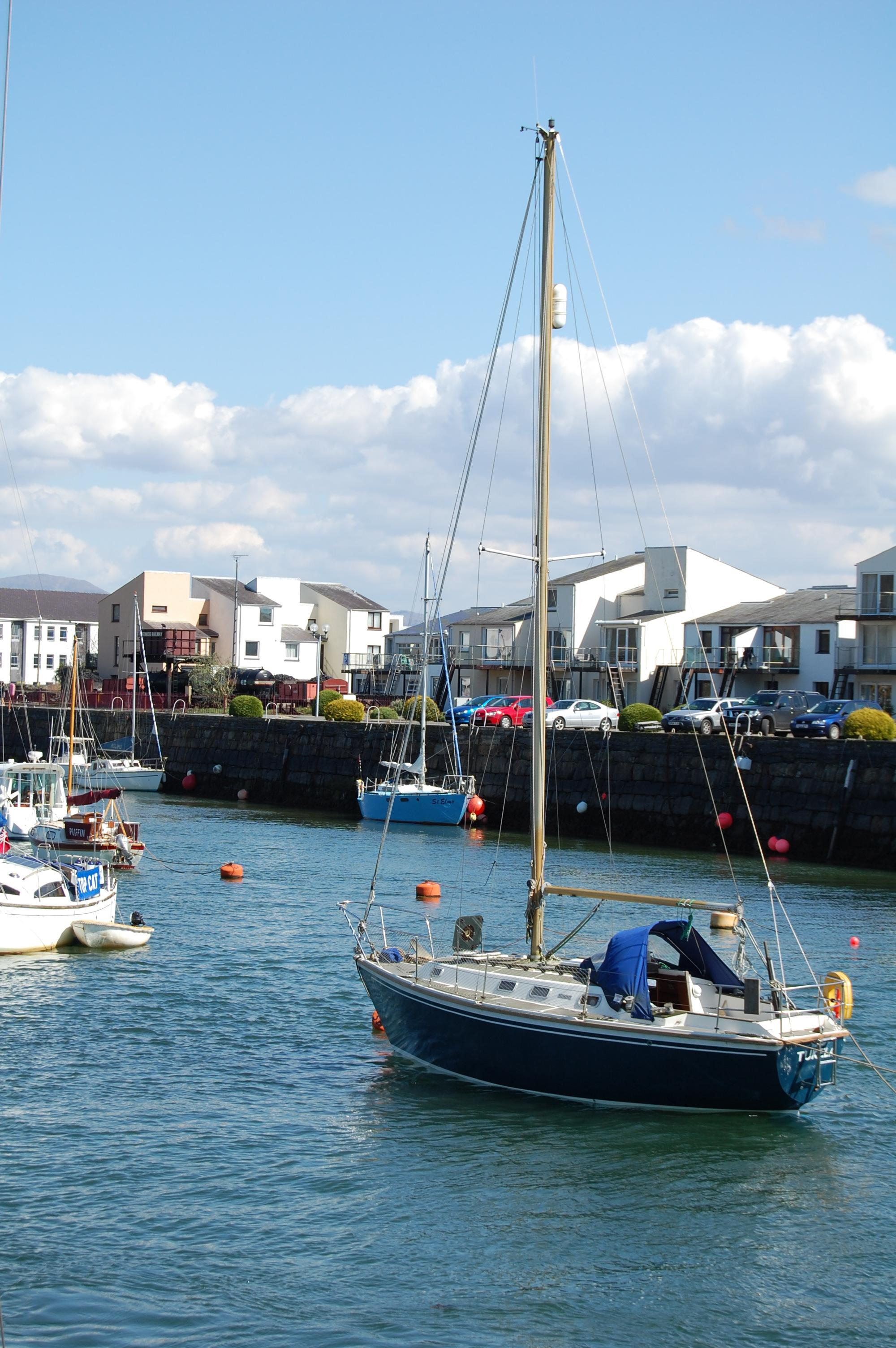
Porthmadog Harbour is home to both Porthmadog Sailing Club and Madoc Yacht Club

Porthmadog Golf Club at Morfa Bychan opened in 1906 on land rented from a farmer. The original tenancy agreement stipulated that golfers must take no game, hares, rabbits or wildfowl and pay compensation for any sheep or cattle killed or injured. The landlord agreed not to turn on to the land any bull or savage cattle. Created by James Braid, five times winner of the British Open, the course is a mixture of heath and links.

Porthmadog Sailing Club, formed in 1958, initially operated from a marquee in a field. In 1964, the club merged with Trawsfynydd Sailing Club and a clubhouse was built. Weekend dinghy racing is run and facilities are provided for cruisers.

Madoc Yacht Club, founded in 1970, is based in the former harbourmaster's office and has an extensive cruising and racing programme, including two races to Ireland. In 2001, a Celtic longboat was purchased and a sea-rowing section formed, which now has four boats. The club competes as part of the Welsh Sea Rowing Association

Glaslyn Leisure Centre on Stryd y Llan has a 25-metre swimming pool and sports hall, badminton, squash and tennis courts, a sauna, a five-a-side football pitch and a dance studio.

Sea angling is popular in the coast villages. Borth-y-Gest offers flounder, bass, mullet, whiting and mackerel. Morfa Bychan provides bass, flounder, eel, whiting and occasional turbot. Bass, flounder and huge schools of whiting are found at Black Rock Sands, along with thornback ray, mackerel and garfish. Bass, flatfish, eel and some very large mullet can be caught in Porthmadog Harbour, in the heart of the town, though care must be taken to avoid taking the poisonous lesser weever.

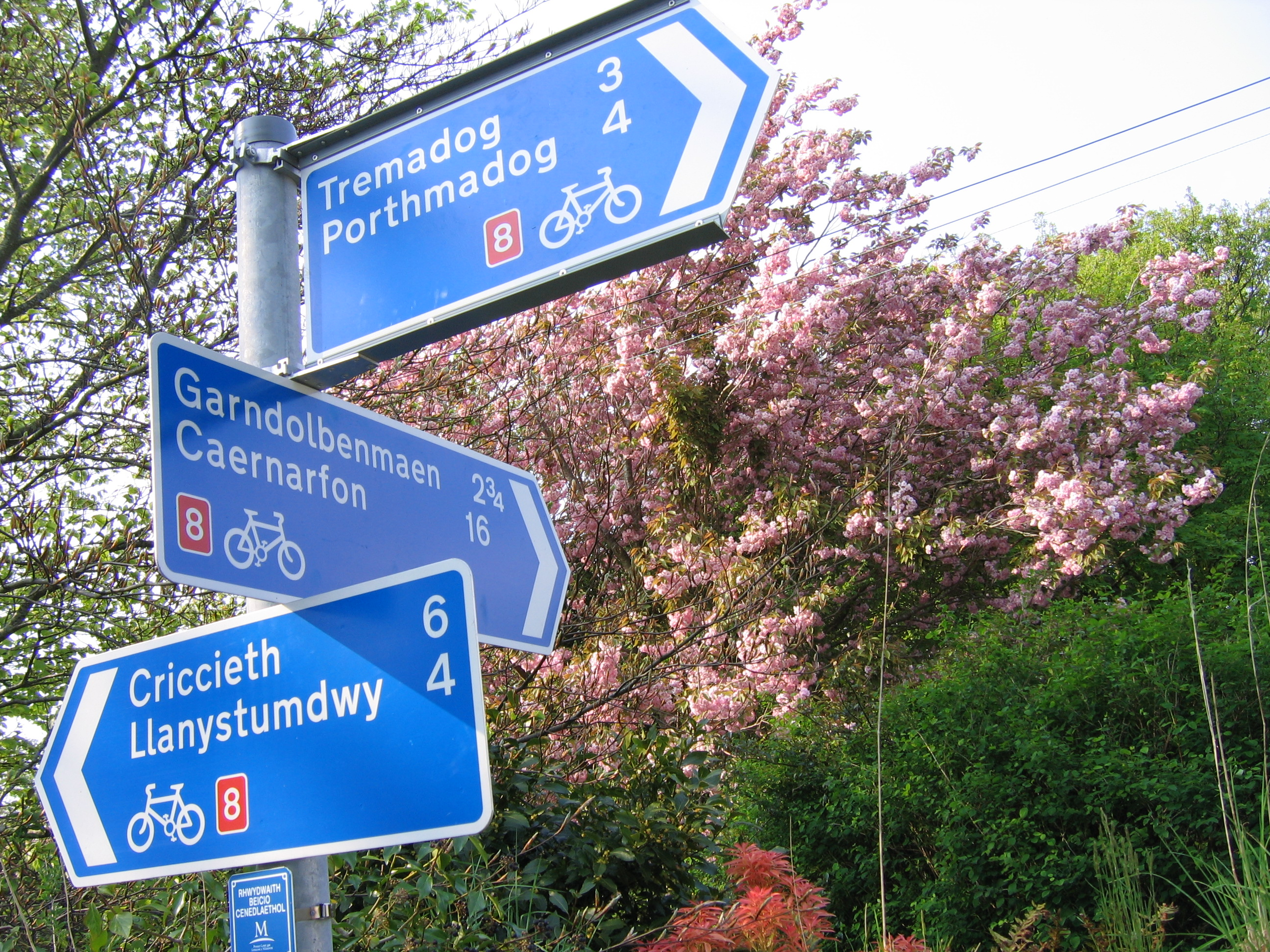
The Lôn Las Cymru cycle route passes through Porthmadog on its way from Holyhead to Cardiff

Glaslyn Angling Association controls fishing rights on most of Afon Glaslyn up to Beddgelert. It mainly holds sea trout, but salmon and brown trout appear. The river had suffered from acid rain and afforestation, but its water quality has improved. Glan Morfa Mawr Trout Fishery at Morfa Bychan is stocked with rainbow trout

A cycle route crosses the Cob as part of Lôn Las Cymru, the Welsh national route from Holyhead in the north to either Cardiff or Chepstow in the south. It is 250 miles (400 km) long and crosses three mountain ranges.

Tremadog's quality rock climbing brings climbers from all over Britain, the dolerite cliffs often being dry when it is too wet to climb in the mountains of Snowdonia. Craig Bwlch y Moch is seen as one of the best crags in Wales.

A fell race on the slopes of Moel y Gest known as "Râs Moel y Gest" is held each year, starting in the town.

Bathing is popular at the broad beach of Black Rock Sands, with a predicted water quality of "excellent". Borth-y-Gest has a sand-and-pebble beach where bathing is safe inshore, but there are fast currents further out.

== Notable people ==
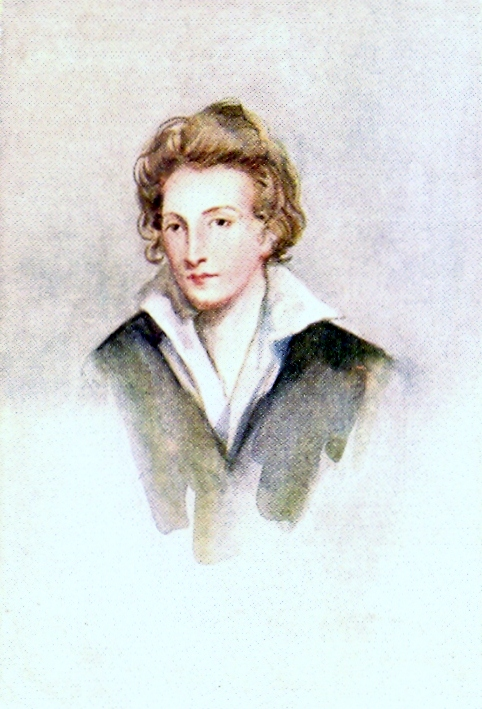
Percy Bysshe Shelley fled Tremadog after an alleged attempt on his life by a nocturnal intruder

- The Welsh-language poet William Ambrose (1813–73), (bardic name Emrys), was minister of the Independent chapel in the town up to his death
- Three members of hip-hop band Genod Droog were from Porthmadog
- Welsh singer Duffy (born 1984) shot her first video "Rockferry" in the town
- Supergrass filmed a video at Morfa Bychan and Portmeirion for the song "Alright", which featured in the 1995 album I Should Coco
- Part of the movie Macbeth (1971) was filmed at Black Rock Sands, as well as the cover art photography for the Manic Street Preachers' 1998 album "This Is My Truth Tell Me Yours"
- Roddy Hughes, actor: (1890-1970)
- Morfa Bychan was the home of David Owen (1712–41), a blind harpist and composer, who died aged just 29 Tradition has it that, on his death bed, he called for his harp and composed the air Dafydd y Garreg Wen; words were added a century later by John Ceiriog Hughes (1832–87)
- Rob Piercy (born 1946), artist, was named Welsh Artist of the Year in 2002
- Elfyn Lewis (born 1969), painter, won the National Eisteddfod of Wales Gold Medal for fine art in 2009 and the Welsh Artist of the Year prize in 2010
- T.E. Lawrence (1888–1935), known as Lawrence of Arabia, was born at what is now Lawrence House in Tremadog. He became renowned for his role in the Arab Revolt of 1916 and for his vivid writings about his experiences
- To finance the construction and repairs to the Cob, William Madocks (1773–1828) let out his own house in Tremadog. His first tenant was the vegetarian poet Percy Bysshe Shelley (1792–1822), who antagonised locals by criticising the production of sheep for consumption and running up debts with local merchants. Shelley made a hasty departure after an alleged attempt on his life by a nocturnal intruder, without paying his rent or contributing to the fund set up to support Madocks. During his tenancy, Shelley had written Queen Mab
- The Spooner family provided a major contribution to developing railways in the area for over more than 70 years in the 19th century
- The ashes of the poet R.S. Thomas (1913–2000) are buried in the churchyard of St John's Church in Ffordd Penamser. An earlier poet raised in the town was Mary Davies (1846–82), who wrote in Welsh.

== Twinning ==
Porthmadog is twinned with Wicklow town, in County Wicklow, Ireland.
