= Blackstone Park Historic District =

Historic district in Rhode Island, United States

- U.S. National Register of Historic Places
- U.S. Historic district
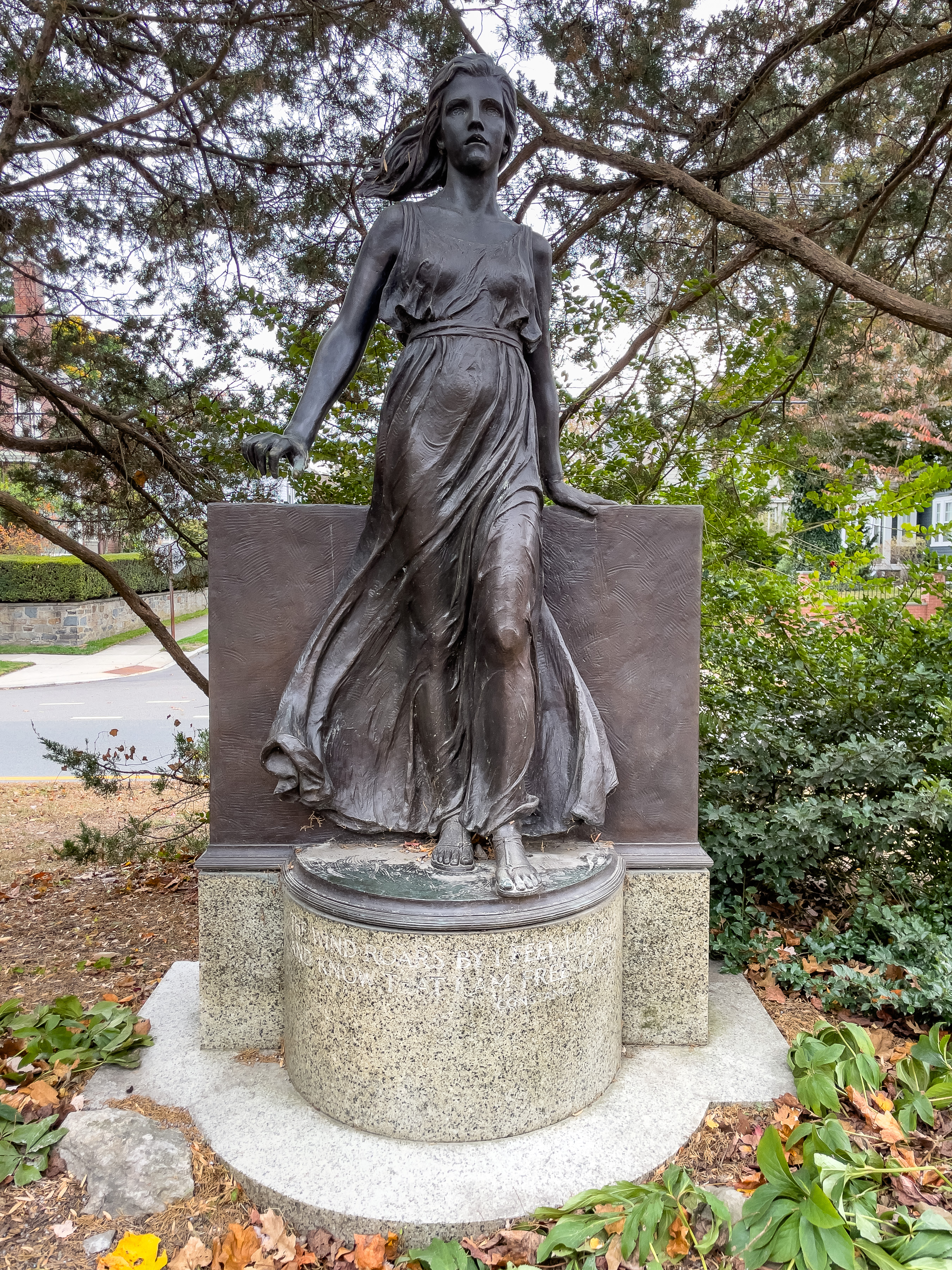
- "A Memorial to Young Womanhood (or The Spirit of Youth)" in Blackstone Park

- Location within Rhode Island Location within the United States
- Location: Providence, Rhode Island
- Coordinates: 41.832927°N 71.381181°W
- Built: 1861
- Architect: Howard K. Hilton et al.
- Architectural style: Late 19th And 20th Century Revivals
- NRHP reference No.: 98000575
- Added to NRHP: June 5, 1998

Blackstone Park Historic District is roughly bounded by the Seekonk River, Laurell Avenue, Blackstone Boulevard, and South Angell Street in Providence, Rhode Island within the Blackstone neighborhood of the East Side.

In 1886 Horace Cleveland planned the laid out of Blackstone Boulevard and it was constructed in 1894 to provide better access to nearby Swan Point Cemetery. The park in the center was planned and suggested by the Olmsted Brothers.

From 1903 to 1948 a trolley line operated down the middle of the boulevard. After the trolley's removal, a walking path was constructed on trolley bed. The surrounding district features architecture by Howard K. Hilton and contains various 19th-century and 20th-century colonial revivals. The district was added to the National Register of Historic Places in 1998.

== See also ==
- Blackstone Boulevard Park
- Blackstone Park Conservation District
- Blackstone Boulevard Realty Plat Historic District
- National Register of Historic Places listings in Providence, Rhode Island
