= Edwin E. Cull =

American architect (1891–1956)

- Born: October 8, 1891; Providence, Rhode Island
- Died: March 19, 1956 (aged 64); Cranston, Rhode Island
- Occupation: Architect
- Practice: Edwin E. Cull; Cull & Robinson; Cull, Robinson & Green

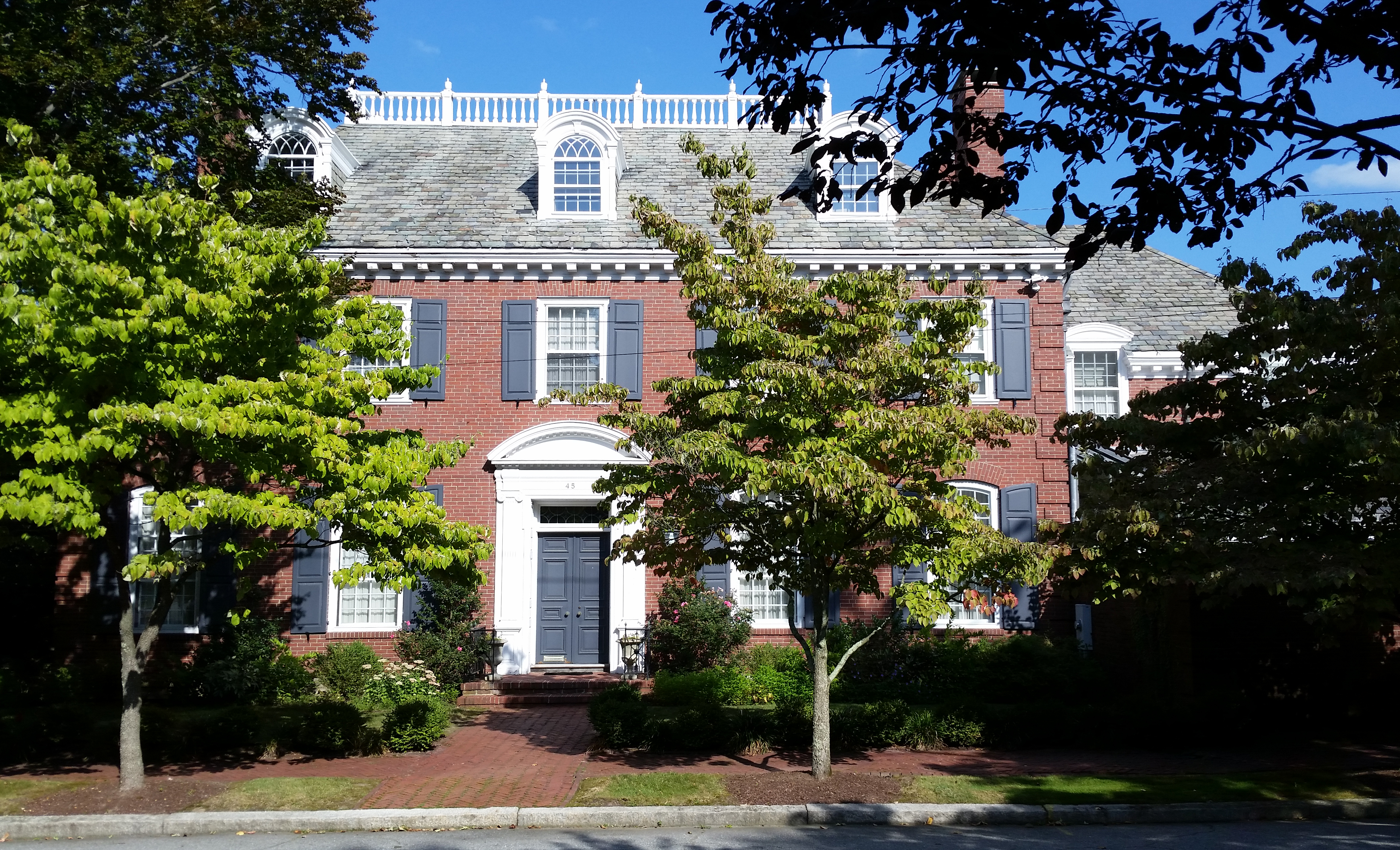
The Edmund J. Sullivan residence in Providence, designed by Cull and completed in 1932.

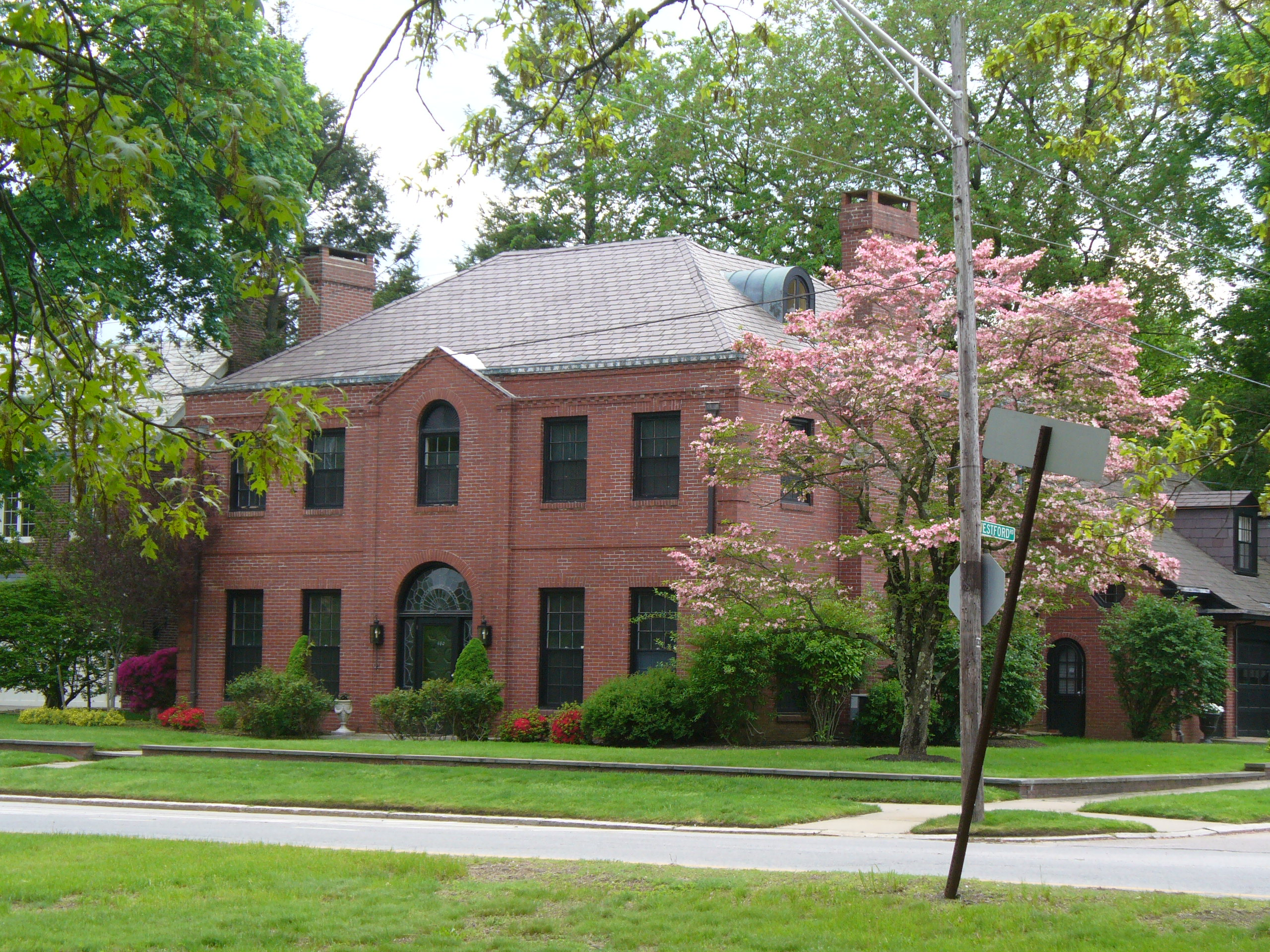
The Alice H. Moran residence in Providence, designed by Cull and completed in 1935.

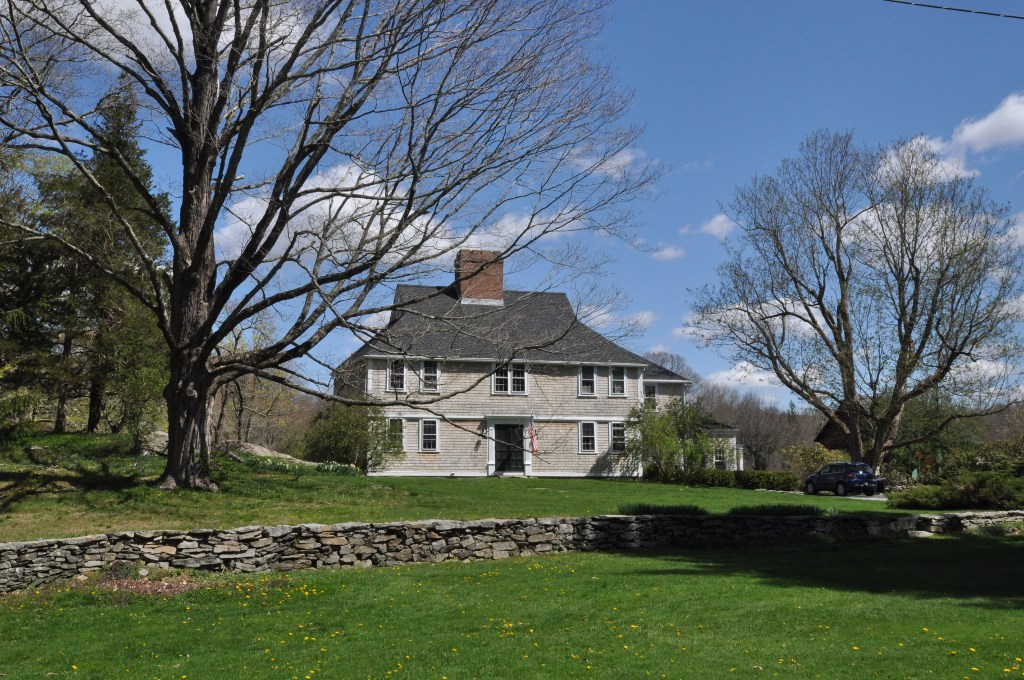
The Carpenter Homestead in Seekonk, Massachusetts, restored by Cull and completed in 1940.

Edwin E. Cull AIA (October 8, 1891 – March 19, 1956) was an American architect in practice in Providence, Rhode Island from 1921 until his death. In 1946 he was cofounder of what is now The Robinson Green Beretta Corporation, one of the largest architecture firms in Rhode Island.

== Life and career ==
Edwin Emory Cull was born October 8, 1891 in Providence, Rhode Island, to James A. Cull, a manufacturer, and Mary Ella Cull, nee Mosher. He was educated in the Providence public schools and at the Rhode Island School of Design with supplementary study at Cornell University. During World War I Cull served in the United States Army Signal Corps and was stationed for the duration of the war in Houston. After being discharged Cull remained in Houston, working for a contracting firm. In 1920 he returned to Providence, where in 1921 he bought out the practice of architect T. Clarence Herrmann and began to practice for himself. As a practicing architect Cull specialized in residential design. He was well known both for the design of new homes and for modernizing old ones without compromising their historic character. He was responsible for the restoration of the Wilson–Winslow House (1936) in Coventry and the Carpenter Homestead (1940) in Seekonk, Massachusetts. He was also associated with Norman M. Isham in the restoration of the Clement Weaver–Daniel Howland House (1940) in East Greenwich. All three of these houses have been listed on the United States National Register of Historic Places. In 1943, during World War II, Cull closed his office. He spent the duration of the war as a consultant to the state War Production Board. After the war Cull joined manufacturers Arnold, Hoffman & Company as their chief architectural engineer.

In 1946 Cull returned to private practice. He and fellow architect Knight D. Robinson acquired the practice of the late mill architect Eugene B. Whipple, forming the partnership of Cull & Robinson. Whipple had established his practice in 1927 after the dissolution of his former firm, Perry & Whipple. Robinson was a Providence native who had been educated at Brown University and the Massachusetts Institute of Technology. He then studied under Walter Gropius at the Harvard Graduate School of Design (GSD), earning a BArch in 1939. During the war he served in the United States Navy. In 1953 Cull & Robinson were joined by a third partner, Conrad E. Green. Green was a native of North Attleborough, Massachusetts and was a nephew of then-senator Theodore F. Green. He had been a classmate of Robinson at the GSD and had worked for Skidmore, Owings & Merrill and Albert Harkness before opening his own office in Providence in 1948.

The work of the partnership reflected Robinson and Green's modernist training. They continued Cull's reputation for the design of homes but also expanded further into institutional work, including the Vartan Gregorian Elementary School (1954), the first modern school in Providence. Cull remained senior partner of the firm until his death in 1956. His partners reorganized the partnership as Robinson, Green & Beretta with the addition of Joseph A. Beretta. In 1970 the partners incorporated the firm as The Robinson Green Beretta Corporation, or RGB Architects, which is still in business in 2024.

== Personal life ==
Cull was a member of the American Institute of Architects, the Rhode Island Historical Society and the Providence Art Club.

Cull was married in 1923 to Natalie Elizabeth Holm and had two children. They lived in Providence. Cull died March 19, 1956 in Cranston, Rhode Island at the age of 64.

== Architectural works ==
=== Edwin E. Cull, 1921–1942 ===
- 1925 – Rhode Island Society for the Prevention of Cruelty to Animals building, 372 W Fountain St, Providence, Rhode Island
- 1928 – Daniel Drake-Smith residence, 23 Taylors Ln S, Little Compton, Rhode Island
- 1928 – Henry C. Jackson residence, 50 Alfred Stone Rd, Providence, Rhode Island
- 1928 – J. Benjamin Nevin residence, (Note: A contributing resource to the Elmgrove Gardens Historic District, NRHP-listed in 2005.) 144 Woodbury St, Providence, Rhode Island
- 1929 – John J. Banigan residence, (Note: A contributing resource to the Blackstone Boulevard Realty Plat Historic District, NRHP-listed in 1995.) 21 Harwich Rd, Providence, Rhode Island
- 1929 – Charles H. Lawton residence, 57 Dryden Ave, Pawtucket, Rhode Island
- 1932 – Edmund J. Sullivan residence, 45 Balton Rd, Providence, Rhode Island
- 1932 – Phi Gamma Delta fraternity house, 90 W Alumni Ave, Kingston, Rhode Island
- 1935 – Animal Husbandry Building, (Note: Demolished.) University of Rhode Island, Kingston, Rhode Island
- 1935 – Alice H. Moran residence, 460 Blackstone Blvd, Providence, Rhode Island
- 1936 – Administration Building, Eleanor Slater Hospital, Howard, Rhode Island
- 1938 – Howard R. Merriman residence, 41 Taylors Ln, Little Compton, Rhode Island (1938)

=== Cull & Robinson, 1947–1954 ===
- 1949 – Adolph Meyer Building, Eleanor Slater Hospital, Howard, Rhode Island
- 1950 – Robert S. Davis residence, (Note: A contributing resource to the Freeman Plat Historic District, NRHP-listed in 1995.) 11 Abbottsford Ct, Providence, Rhode Island

=== Cull, Robinson & Green, 1953–1956 ===
- 1953 – First Federal Savings and Loan Association Building, 110 Westminster St, Providence, Rhode Island
- 1954 – Vartan Gregorian Elementary School, 455 Wickenden St, Providence, Rhode Island
- 1955 – A. Merrill Percelay residence, 22 Bedford Rd, Pawtucket, Rhode Island
- 1956 – Roger Freeman Jr. residence, 57 Hazard Ave, Providence, Rhode Island
- 1956 – Rhode Island Yacht Club, 1 Ocean Ave, Cranston, Rhode Island
