= Blackstone Park Conservation District =

Public park in Providence, Rhode Island

Coordinates: 41.832826°N 71.379334°W

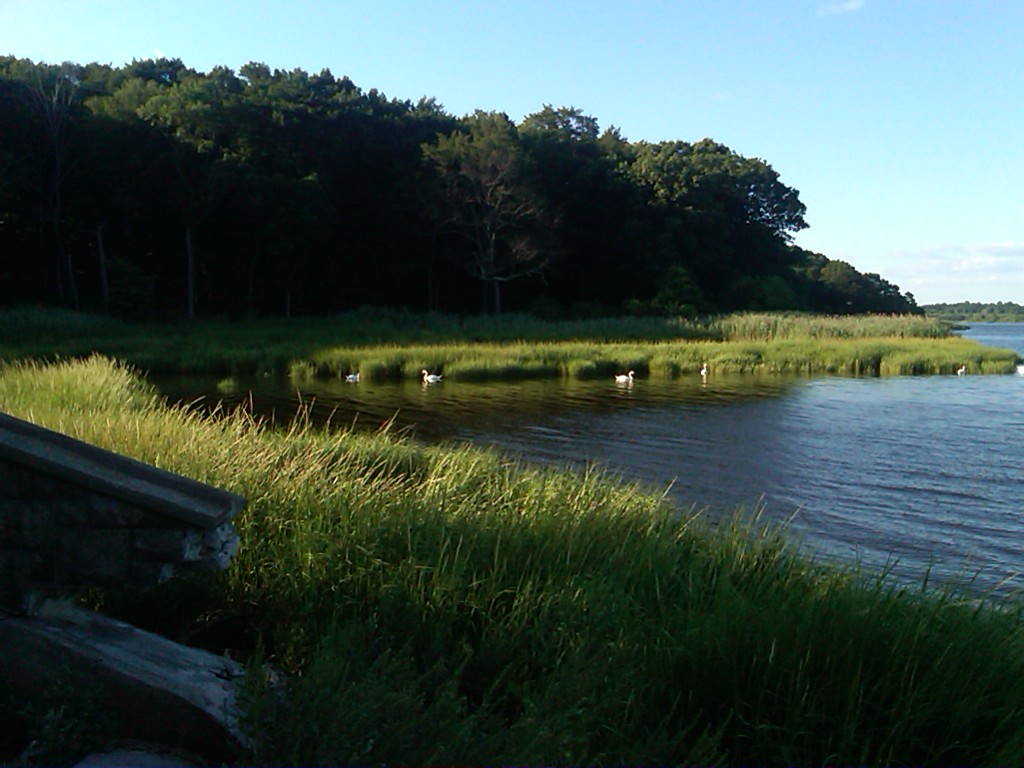
- View of the Seekonk River, looking north from Blackstone Park.
- Interactive map of Blackstone Park Conservation District
- Type: Urban park
- Location: Providence, Rhode Island
- Area: 45 acres (18 ha)
- Created: 2003
- Operator: Blackstone Parks Conservancy

The Blackstone Park Conservation District is a public, 45-acre woodland conservation area on the East Side of Providence, Rhode Island. It is run by the non-profit Blackstone Parks Conservancy in partnership with the Providence Parks Department. The park is situated on the west bank of the tidal Seekonk River, the northernmost part of Narragansett Bay tidewater. The park lies within the watershed and wildlife corridor of the Blackstone River Valley. Unlike many city parks, it is actively managed as a preserve for the purpose of providing habitats for wildlife and supporting a healthy ecosystem for native flora and fauna.

== Ecology ==
Ecologically, the Blackstone Conservation District is a Northeastern coastal forest. The woodland is dominated by broadleaf trees, predominantly oak, American beech, and black birch. There are also shrubs like clethra and mountain laurel, and many other plant species, including bayberry and native wildflowers such as pink lady’s slipper, May apple, false Solomon’s seal, and Canada mayflower. Elderberry, Joe Pye weed, goldenrod, bur cucumber, evening primrose, milkweed, and touch-me-nots grow along York Pond near Irving Avenue.

The woods and shoreline are home to many species of shorebirds, gulls, owls and songbirds, as well as various small mammals. The ponds are home to several species of turtle. Along the Seekonk River, there are horse mussels, horseshoe crabs, and occasional harbor seals. Frequently sighted birds include sandpipers, buffleheads, tree swallows, mute swans, ring-billed gulls and American black ducks. Aquatic vegetation like spartina grass and phragmites grow in the high marsh areas of the river, while species of seaweed live in the intertidal zone.

Ecosystem threats

The conservation district aims to promote the survival of native species and to maintain an ecosystem healthy enough to support species whose habitats are threatened by environmental degradation and land development. The park's flora and fauna face several threats. Erosion along trails is a main concern, caused in part by visitors unlawfully letting dogs off-leash and permitting their pets to enter areas off of designated trails. The Blackstone Conservancy has received grants to counteract damage to a trail and adjacent forest, stabilizing the trail, adding plants, and putting up fencing and signs to protect sensitive trail entrance points. In addition, heavy rainstorms due to climate change contribute to critical soil erosion of the bluffs.

Invasive species are also an ongoing threat to the park's native wildlife. Among the most difficult invasives to combat are Japanese knotweed, purple loosestrife, and bittersweet. Other non-native invasive species in the park include Norway maples, Black locusts, Japanese barberry, garlic mustard, tree of heaven (or Chinese sumac), multiflora rose, and wisteria. Littering is also a problem, although some visitors collect trash. The Conservancy holds volunteer clean-up days twice a year.

== History of the site ==
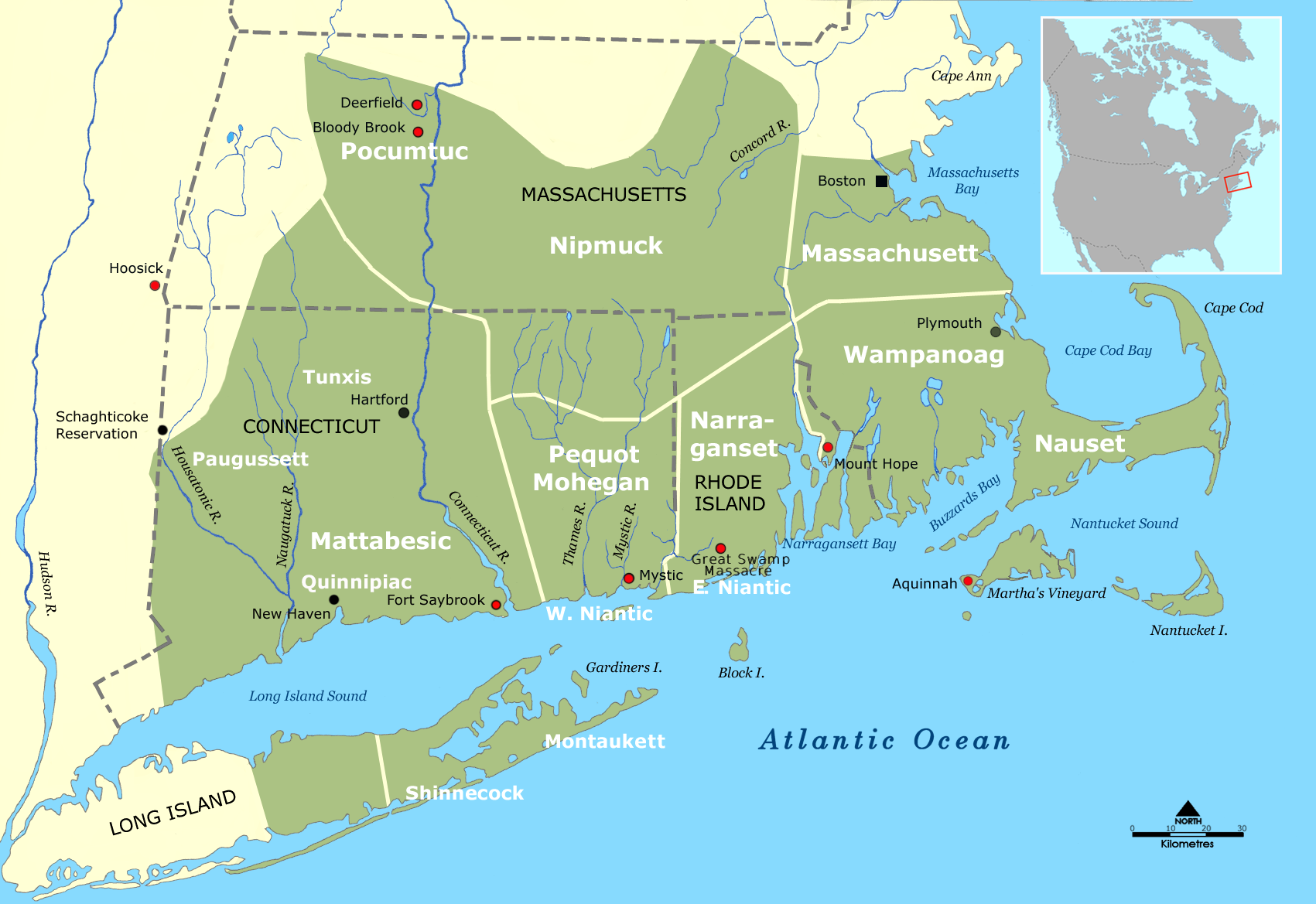
Tribal Territories of Southern New England

The park is situated in an area where people of the Narragansett peoples lived for centuries before the arrival of European settlers in the 17th century. The Seekonk River's name may be derived from the Algonquian word for either skunk or black goose.

In the 1700s, the site was a part of the 300-acre farm owned by a wealthy merchant and abolitionist Moses Brown (for whom an adjacent private school is named). The area was subdivided by Brown's descendant Moses Jenkins in 1861 as the Blackstone Park Plat. In 1866, Jenkins subdivided his land, donating five acres of land for a public park.

Beginning in the 1890s, the city began to expand and develop the park, purchasing eighteen acres from landowners in 1893 and additional land acquired over subsequent decades. For a number of years, the park received little investment. Locals took sand from the riverbanks for construction projects, and when the city planted pine trees to prevent shore destruction, people dug up the pines for private yards. Beginning in 1908, the city constructed a bridal path for horseback riding and the stairway from the bluffs to York Pond, graded the bluffs at Irving Avenue, and created a bridle path for horseback riding.

A boathouse for the Narragansett Boat Club sits on the riverbank at the intersection of Angel Street and River Road. The club was founded in 1838 and is the oldest continuous rowing club, perhaps the oldest continuous athletic club, in the United States. The boathouse was designed in 1891 by architect George Frederic Hall, who was also a club member.

In the 1930s, during the Great Depression, the federal government's Works Progress Administration built the park's waterfront. The Federal Emergency Relief Administration also likely contributed to the park's development. Workers added granite stairs, curbs, and made other improvements throughout the park.

== Management and funding ==
The Blackstone Parks Conservancy and the City of Providence Parks Department jointly manage both the Blackstone Park Conservation District and the nearby Blackstone Boulevard Park. In addition to public funding and private donations, the Rhode Island Coastal Resources Management Council (CRMC) provided partial funding to the Conservancy in 2020 for coastal upland edge restoration, to mitigate trail erosion. The CRMC also provided a 2017 grant to mitigate erosion, plant native species and add fencing to protect the new plants.

== Images of the conservation district ==
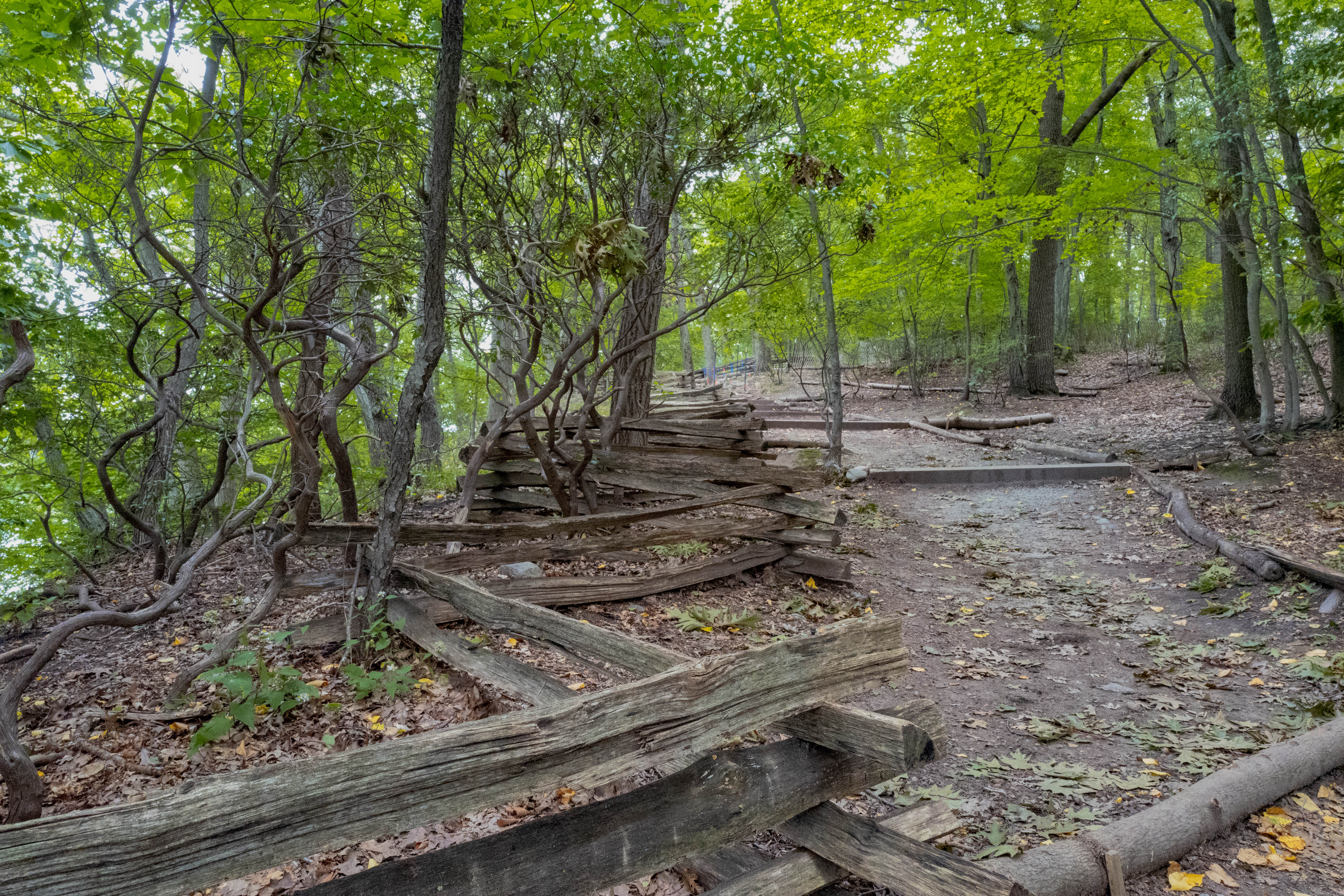
Walking trail in Blackstone Park Conservation District.

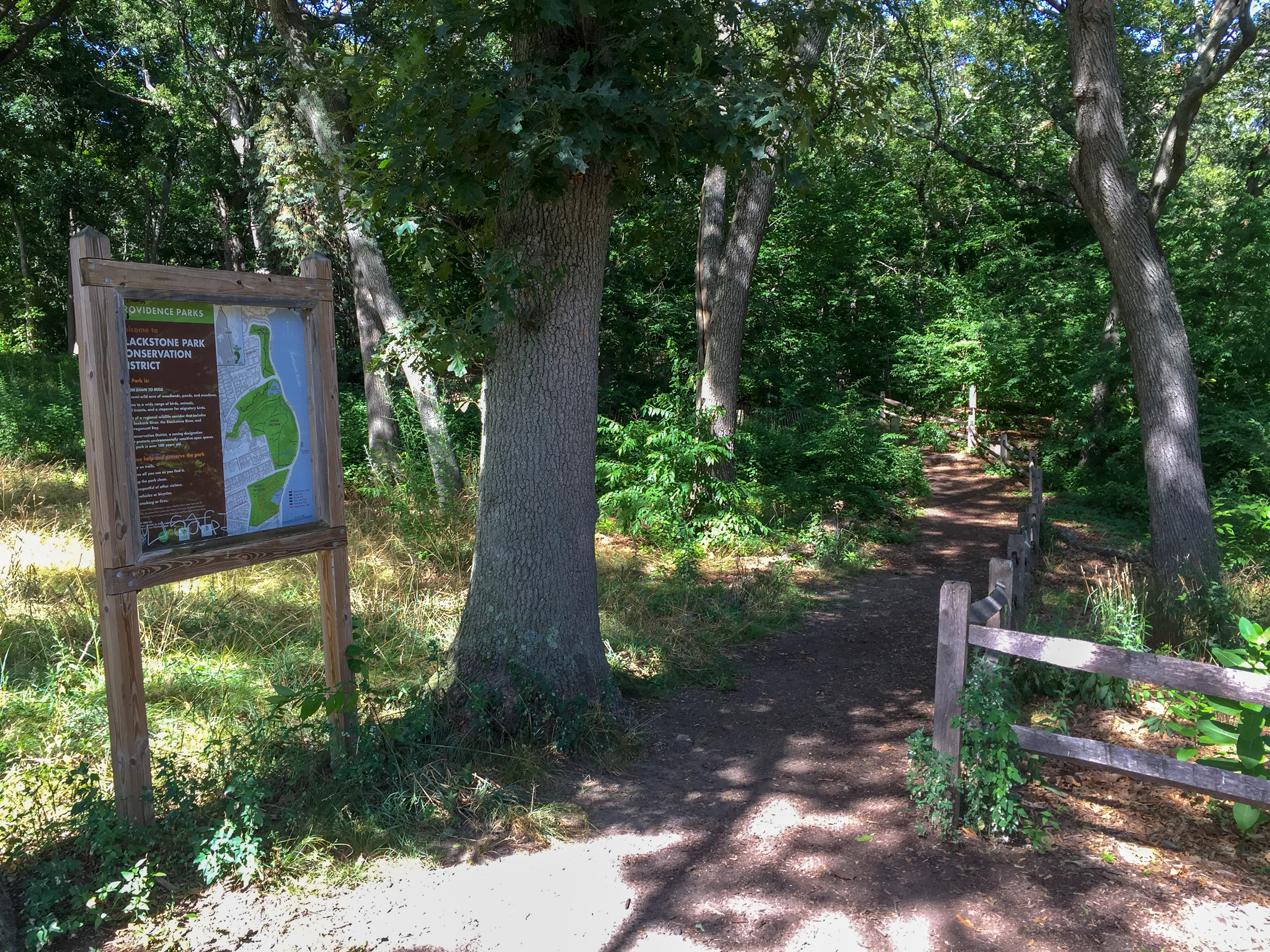
Blackstone Park entrance at Parkside Rd.

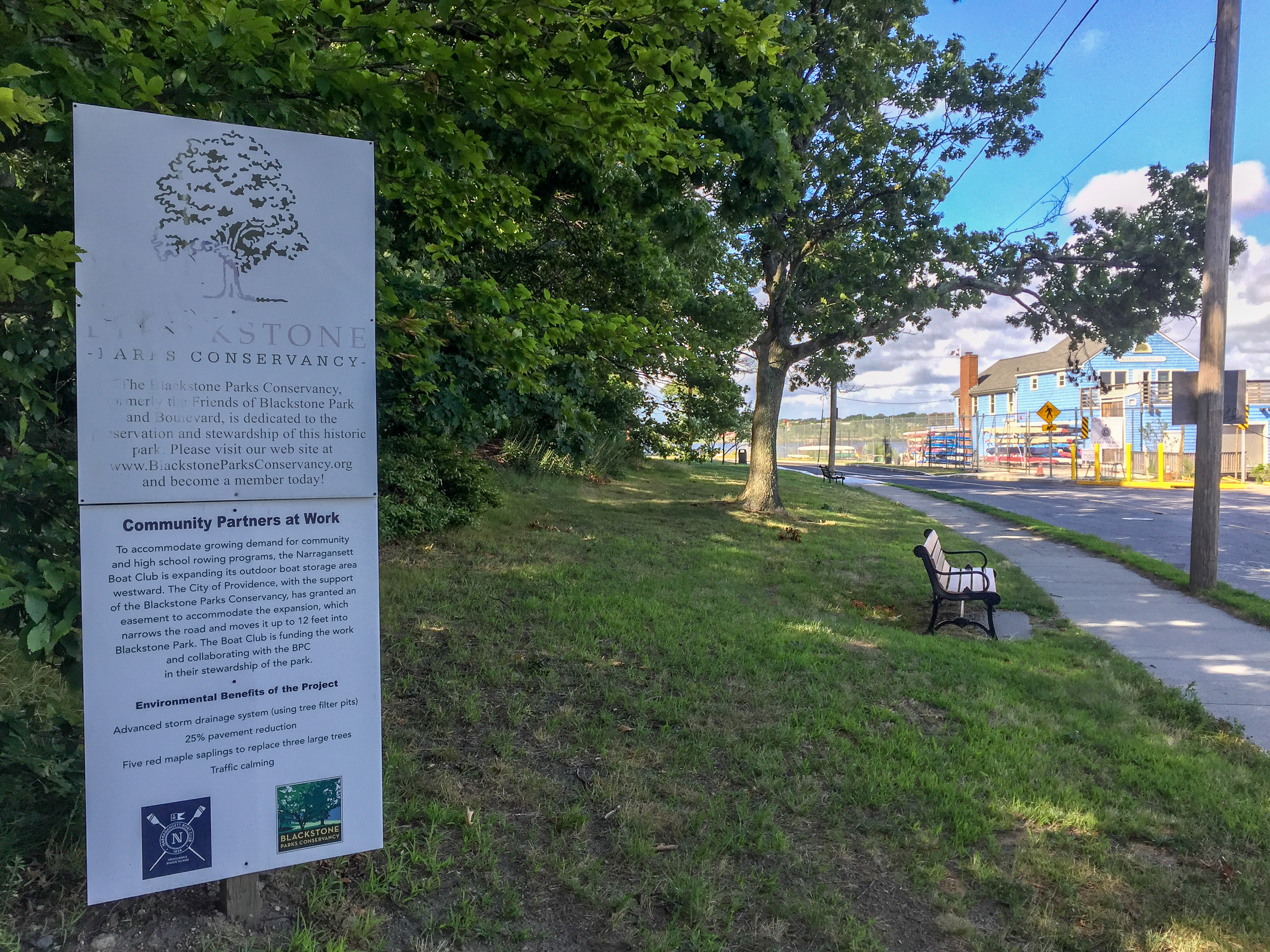
Blackstone Park entrance at Angell St. and Albin Moser Boathouse.

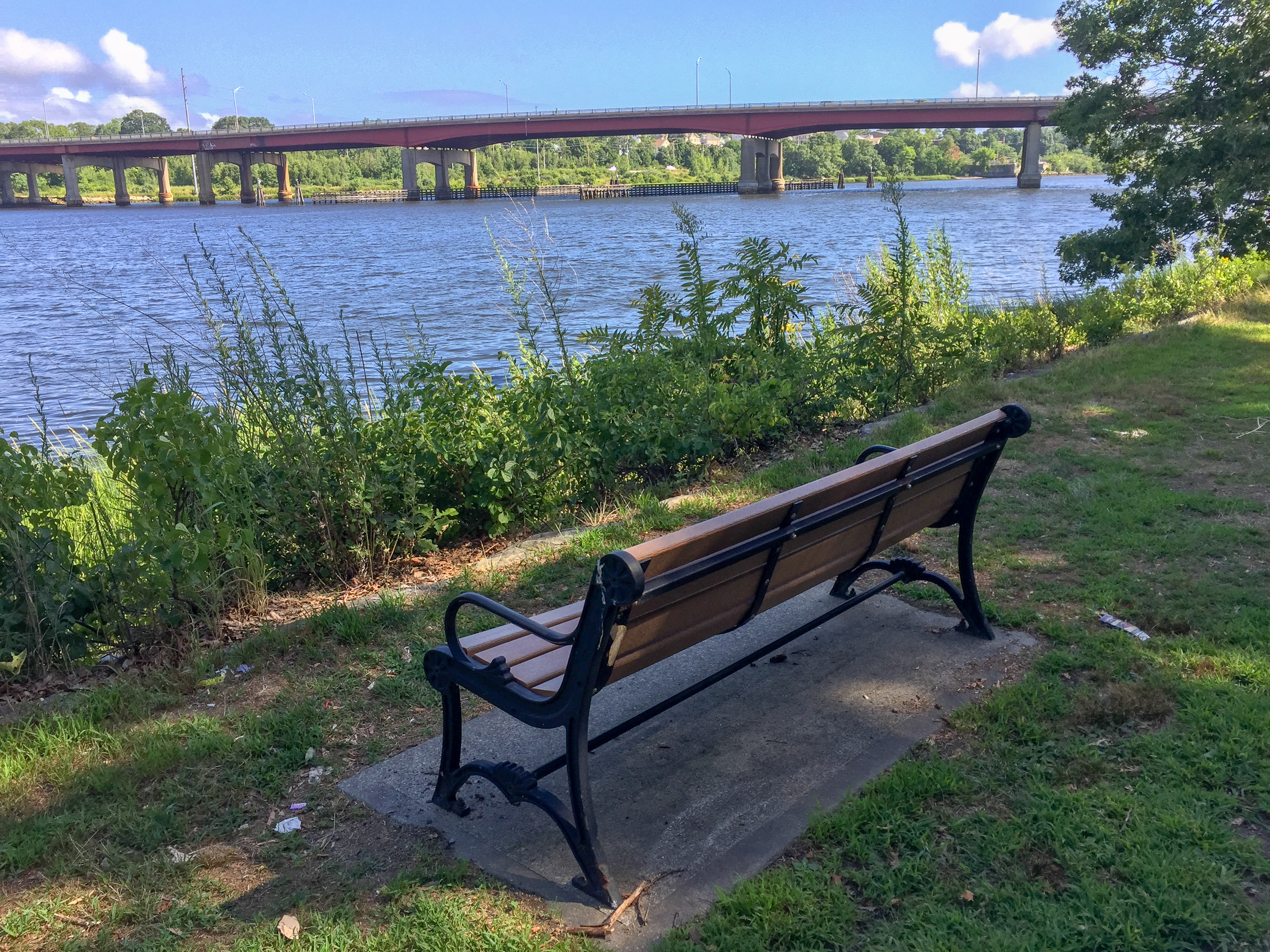
View from Blackstone Park toward the Henderson Bridge and Seekonk River.

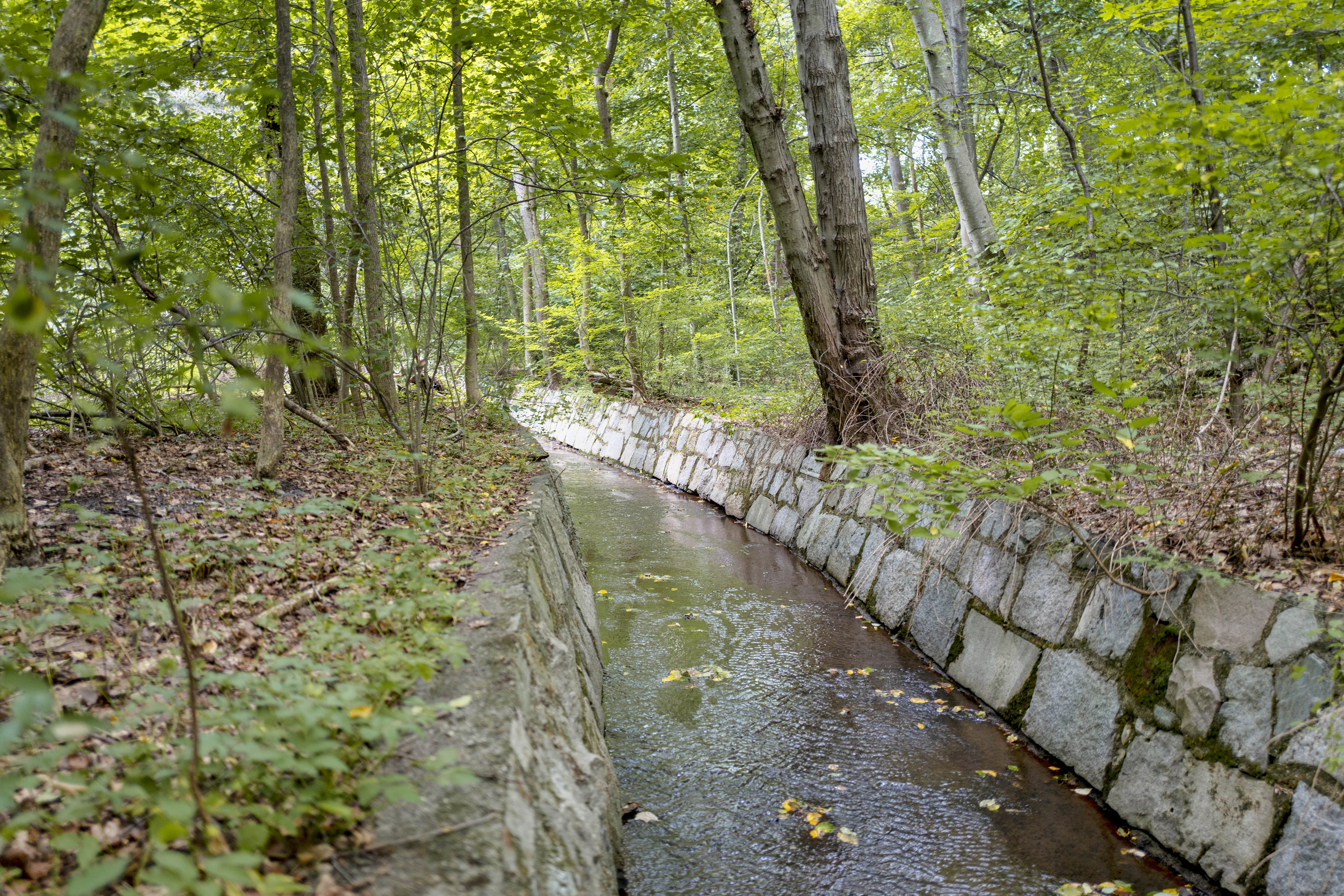
Waterway in Blackstone Park.

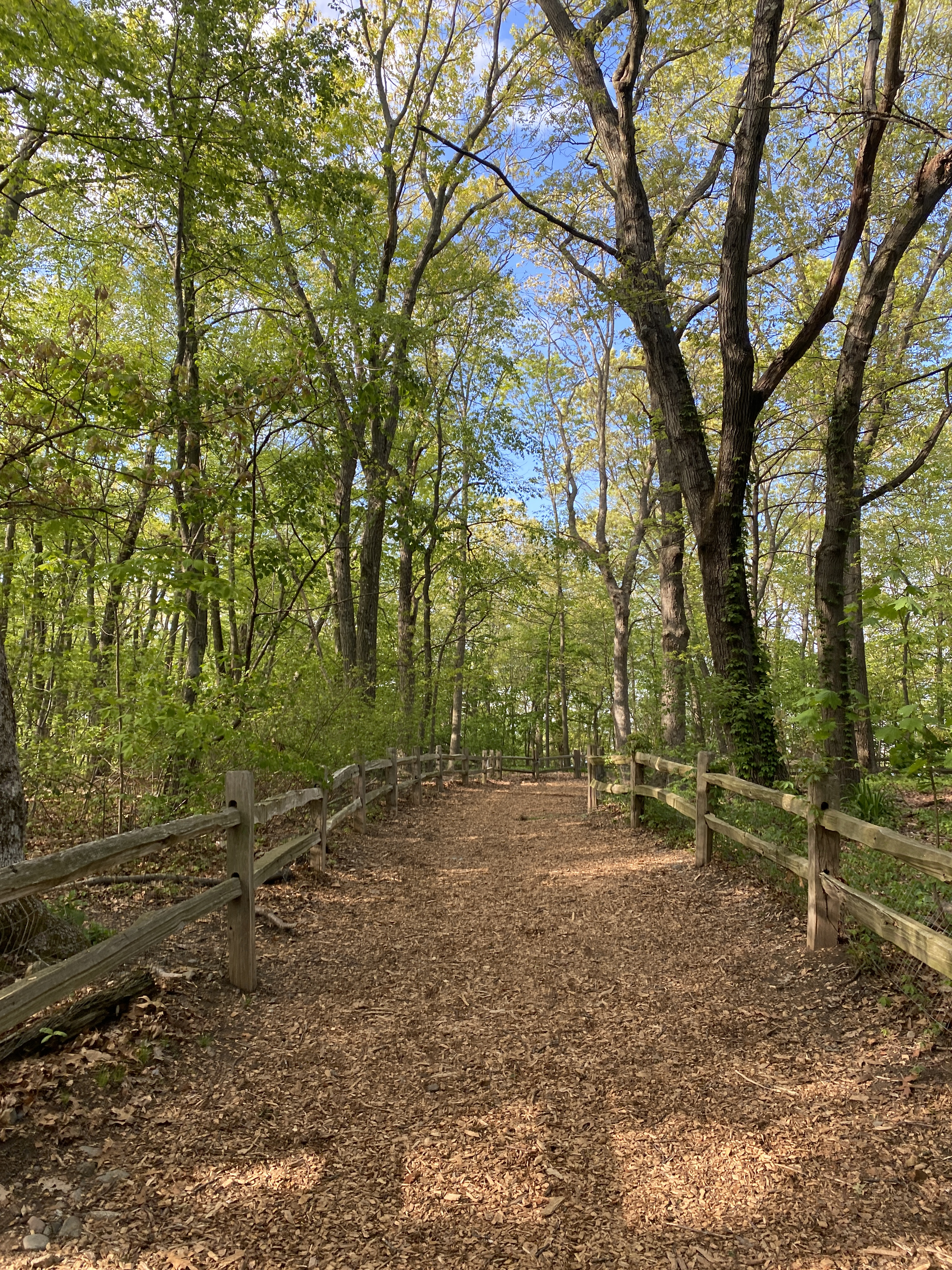
Blackstone Park Conservation District Trail, May 2026

== See also ==
- Blackstone Boulevard Park
- Blackstone Park Historic District
- Blackstone Boulevard Realty Plat Historic District
- Urban green space
- Conservation Biology
- Biodiversity
