= Blackstone, Providence, Rhode Island =

Predominantly residential neighborhood in Providence, Rhode Island

Coordinates: 41.84°N 71.39°W

Blackstone is a predominantly residential neighborhood in Providence, Rhode Island. It is in the northeast corner of the city and is bounded to the south and west by Lloyd Avenue and Hope Street respectively. It is one of six neighborhoods comprising the East Side of Providence.

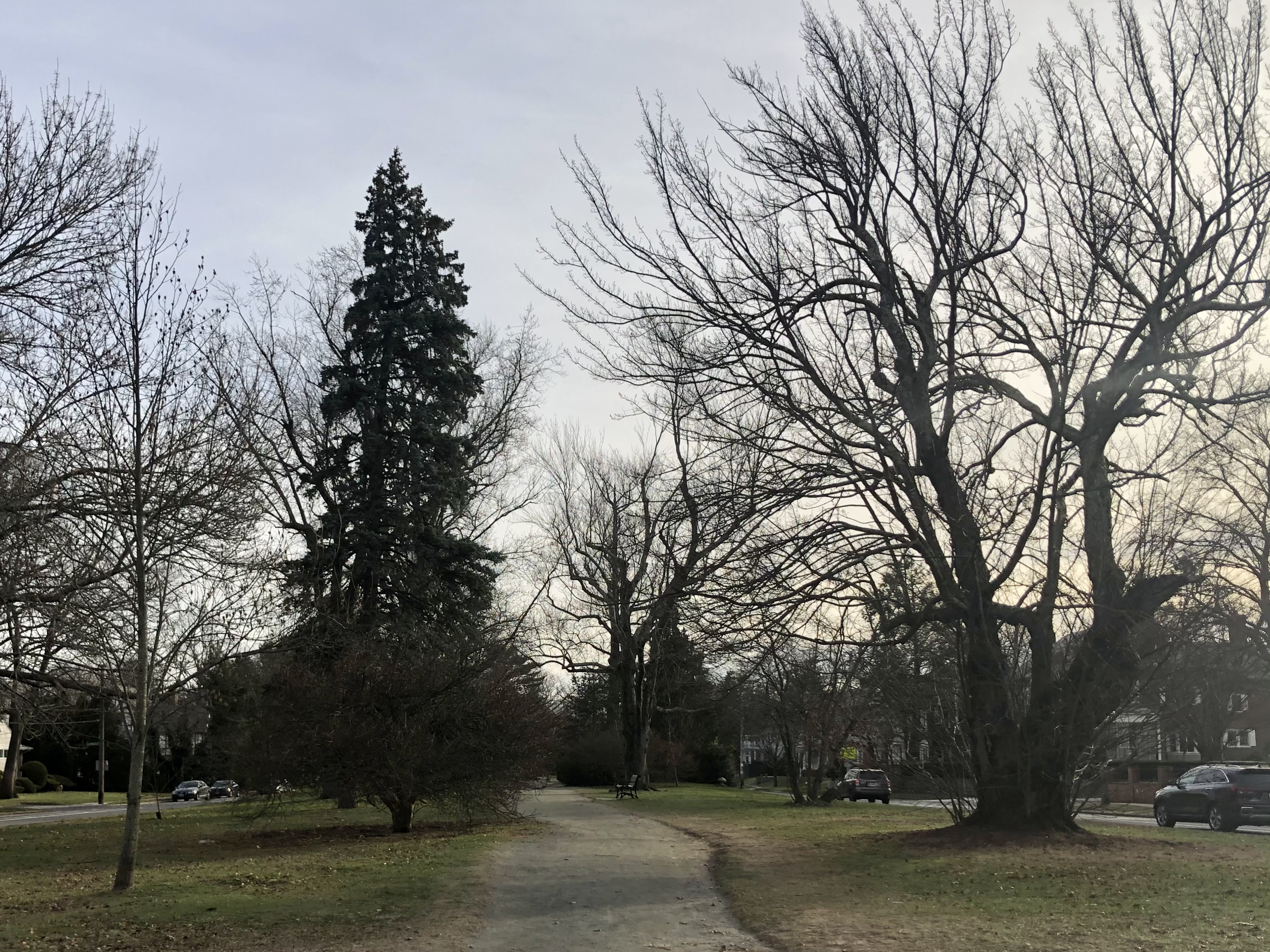
View of Blackstone Boulevard Park trees and path in winter, Providence, Rhode Island.

== History ==
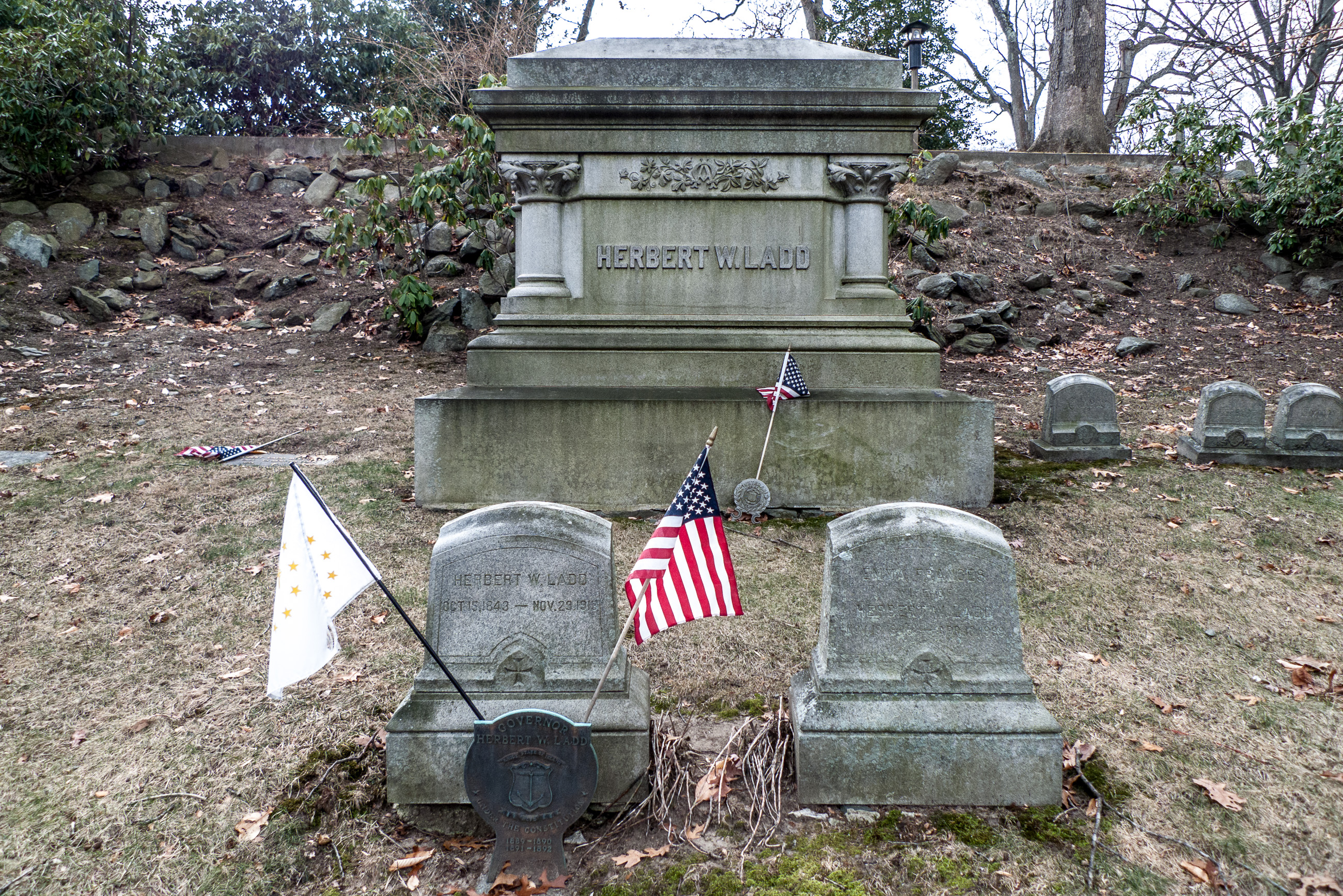
Swan Point Cemetery is the final resting place of several Rhode Island governors, including Herbert W. Ladd

Blackstone is one of the last parts of Providence to be developed, as the remoteness of its location and marshy land had precluded significant development before the late 19th century. It wasn't until construction of Blackstone Boulevard in 1894 as a means of reaching Swan Point Cemetery that the area saw extensive residential development.

The area was largely marshland, and the earliest road was Cat Swamp Lane followed the high ground. Several farms were located in the area during the 1700s, and a few farmhouses from that era remain. In the late 1700s, several burial grounds were established in the remote western part of the city. Several of these by 1847 and 1858 became consolidated into present-day Swan Point Cemetery.

=== Construction of Blackstone Boulevard ===
By the 1870s the cemetery was accessible by means of a public omnibus which journeyed by means of a winding zigzag road which ran along present-day North Main Street, Olney Street, Morris Avenue, Sessions Street, Cole Avenue, and Rochambeau. In 1886 the directors of Swan Point Cemetery hired landscape architect Horace Cleveland of Chicago to plan a road to improve access to the cemetery from the town of Providence. This road opened in 1894 as Blackstone Boulevard.

Blackstone Boulevard became a catalyst for development in the neighborhood, spurring construction of single family homes which were "architecturally distinctive" from the rest of the city. Between 1890 and 1923, property values along the Boulevard tripled, as the neighborhood became one of the most desirable and fashionable in the city. In the early 1900s, the Boulevard was redesigned to create the Blackstone Boulevard Park.

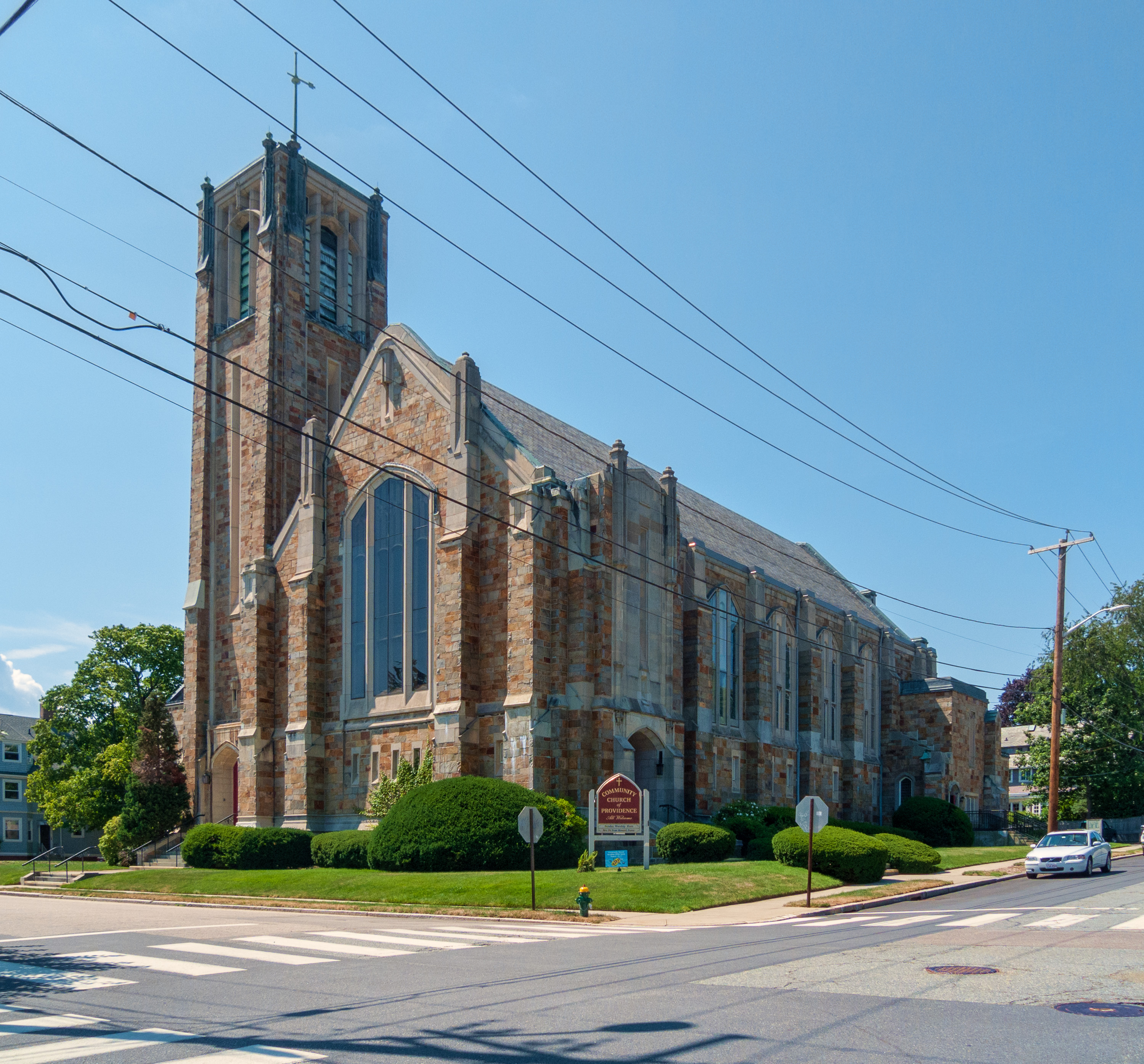
Community Church of Providence, formerly Central Baptist Church, at Wayland and Lloyd Ave.

The 20th century saw institutional development in the form of Central Baptist Church, Temple Emanuel, and St. Sebastian's Roman Catholic Church.

== Description ==
The Blackstone neighborhood comprises the northeast corner of the East Side of Providence, between the eastern ridge of the Moshassuck River Valley and the western bank of the Seekonk River. Blackstone is primarily residential, and made up of mainly of single-family dwellings. It is one of the city's most affluent neighborhoods.

=== Houses of Worship ===
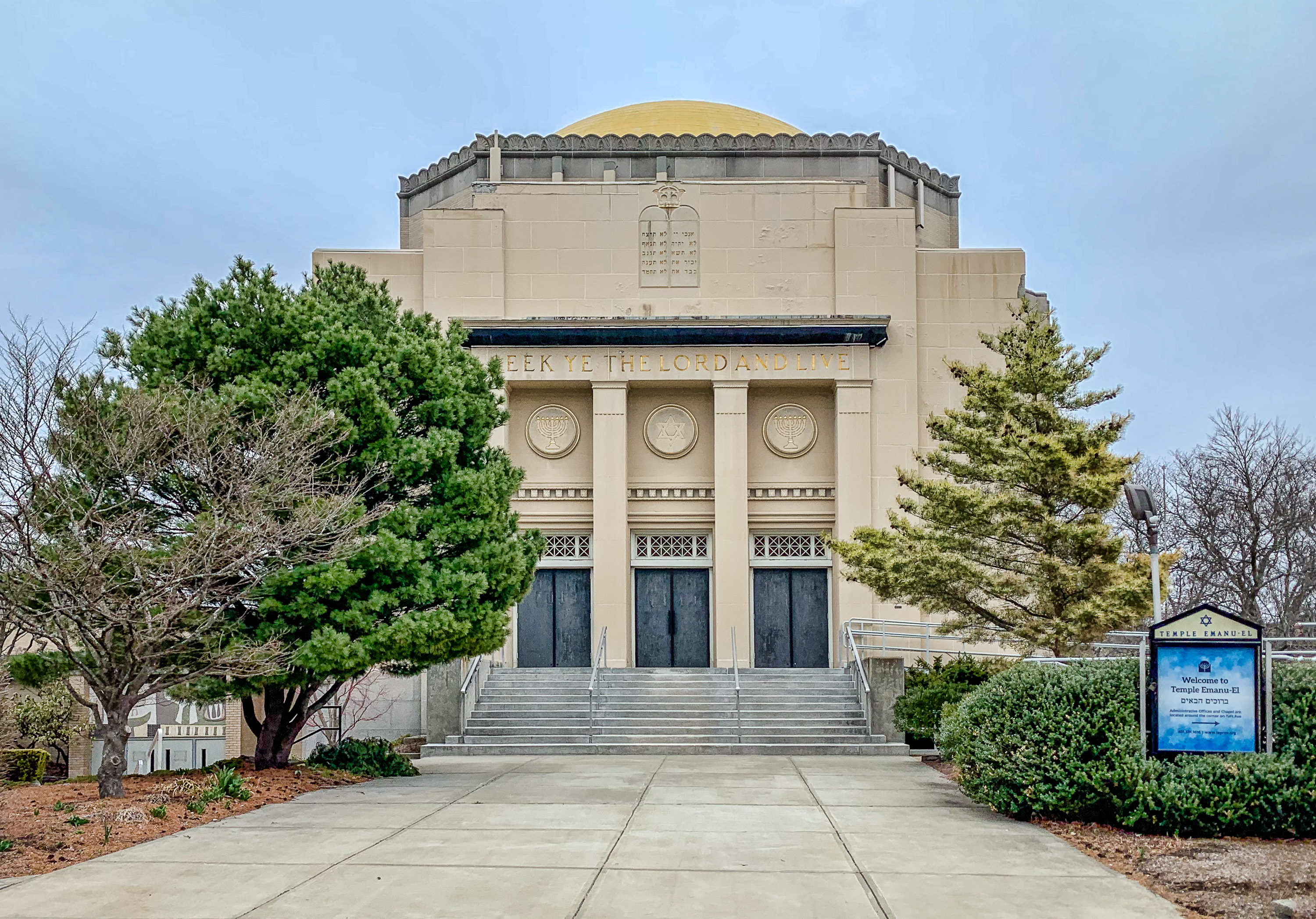
Temple Emmanuel at Morris Ave and Sessions Street

Notable religious institutions in the area include Temple Emanu-El, St. Sebastian's Roman Catholic Church and the Community Church of Providence (formerly Central Baptist).

The Community Church began as an offshoot of the First Baptist Church in America. The congregation originally was known as the Second Baptist Church, then Pine Street Baptist, and in 1917 opened at Lloyd and Wayland Street as Central Baptist. In 2003, the church became known as Community Church of Providence.

Between 1917 and 2018 the building featured a large Tiffany stained glass memorial to Frederick W. Hartwell created by Agnes F. Northrop entitled "Light in Heaven and Earth". The complex work was considered "one of the largest and finest landscape windows ever produced by Tiffany Studios", but largely was overlooked in the community. In 2018, the church sold the window to the Art Institute of Chicago where it is undergoing conservation and preparation to be displayed prominently in September 2020 as the Hartwell Memorial Window.

=== Brown University ===
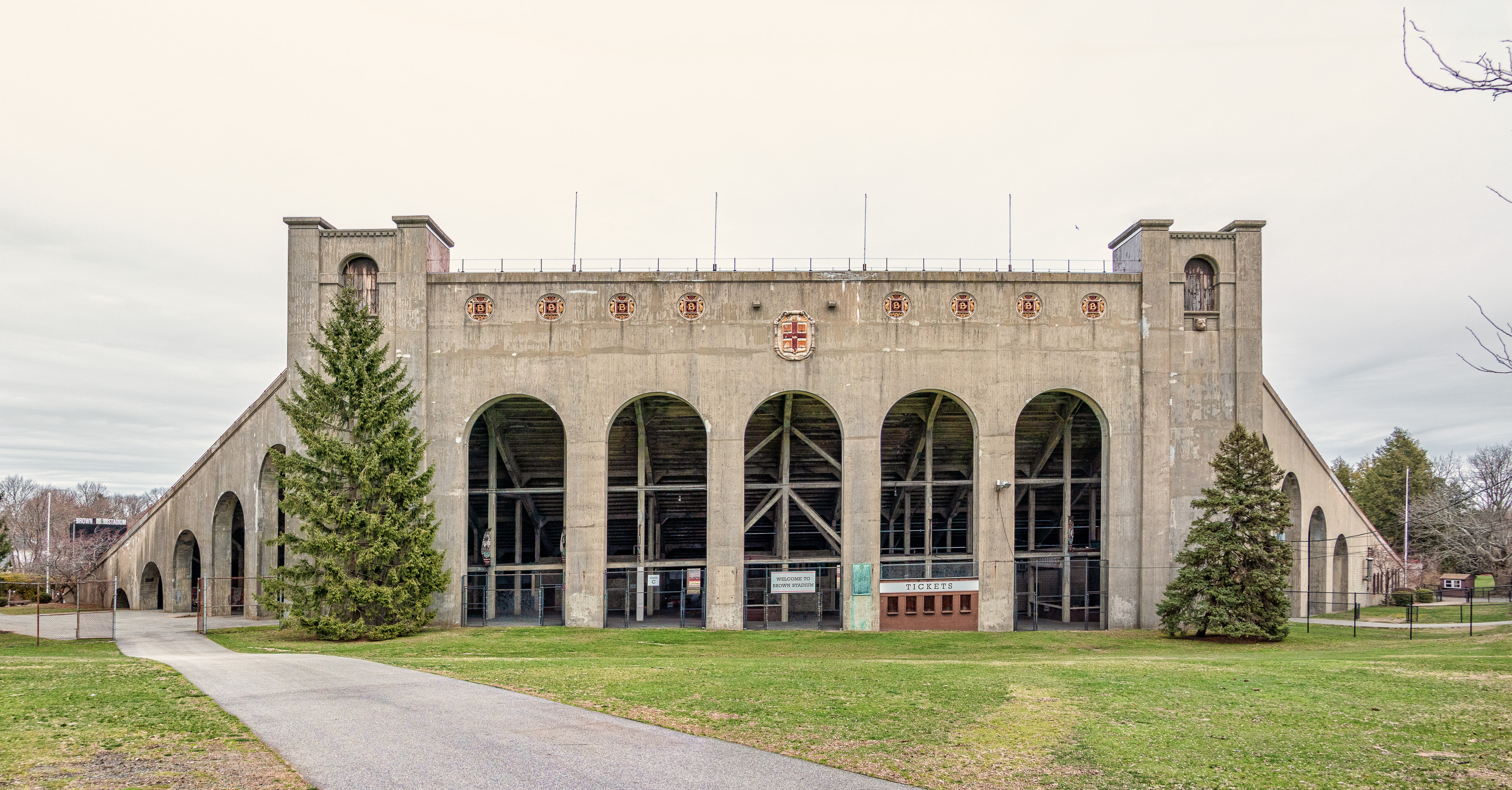
Brown Stadium

Brown University built several facilities in the neighborhood. Ladd Observatory was built in 1891 on the edge of the neighborhood at Hope Street and Doyle Avenue. In the 1920s Brown built several athletic facilities along Elmgrove Avenue, including Brown Stadium (1925), Aldrich Field (1925—1961), and Marvel Gymnasium (1927—1989). Aldrich field was sold in 1961 and developed as a residential neighborhood, with streets named for Brown presidents Maxcy, Faunce, Barbour, and Wriston. Marvel Gym was closed in 1989 and demolished.

=== Hospitals ===
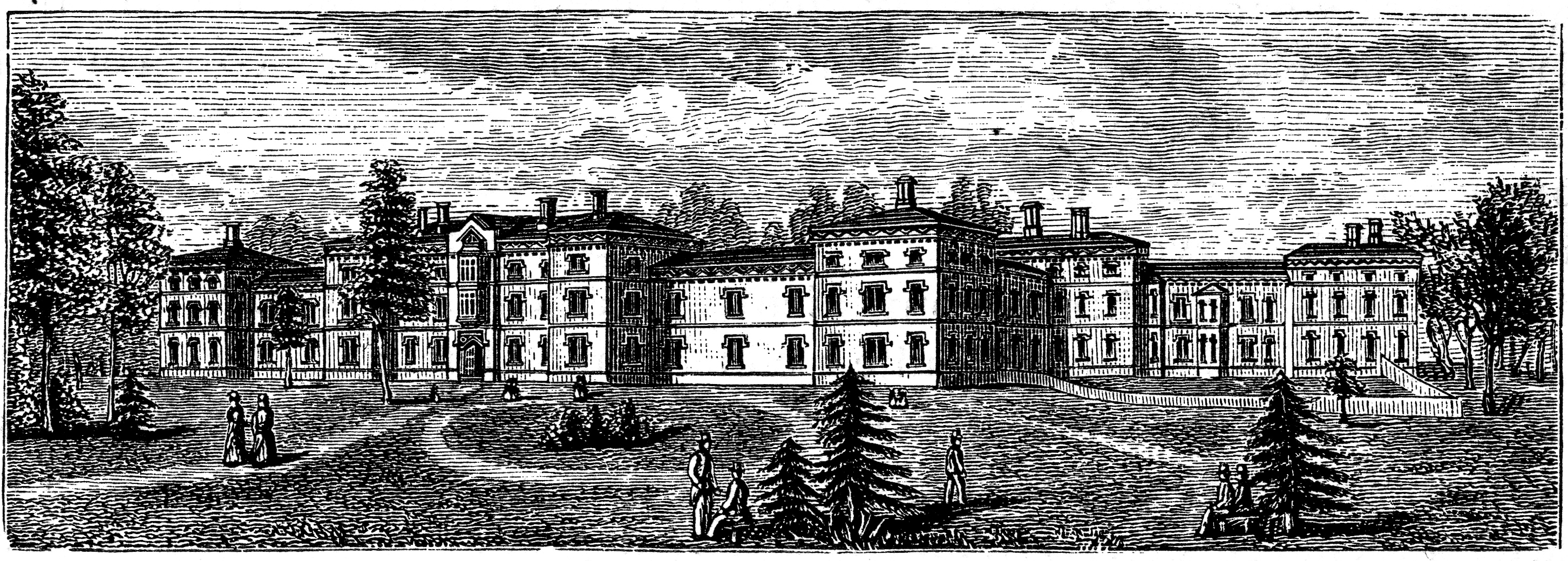
Butler Hospital, 1886 engraving

Butler Hospital, located off Blackstone Boulevard, is Rhode Island's only private mental health hospital. Founded in 1844, the hospital offers psychiatric and substance-abuse treatment programs. The hospital was built in 1847 on the Richard Browne Farm at the end of Rochambeau Avenue. The building is a huge Gothic structure surrounded by landscaping, built according to the philosophy of the time to remove patients from the stresses of urban life to a rural setting.

=== Parks ===
- Blackstone Boulevard Park is a green space between northbound and southbound lanes of Blackstone Boulevard. It consists of 19.3 acres (78,000 m^{2}) of parkland and a 1.7-mile (2.7 km) jogging/walking path.
- Lippitt Memorial Park is located at the intersection of Hope Street and Blackstone Boulevard near the Pawtucket border.
- Blackstone Park Conservation District is a 45 acres (180,000 m^{2}) woodland conservation area along the river, important bird habitat for the Seekonk River and Blackstone wildlife corridor.

== Demographics ==
For census purposes, the Census Bureau classifies Blackstone as part of the Census Tract Area 34. This neighborhood had 4,993 inhabitants based on data from the 2020 United States Census.

The racial makeup of the neighborhood was 73.2% (3,655) White (Non-Hispanic), 0.4% (20) Black (Non-Hispanic), 10.7% (536) Asian, 7.4% (367) from some other race or from two or more races. Hispanic or Latino of any race were 8.3% (415) of the population. 11.7% are foreign born.

The median age in this area is 41.9 years old. Family Households made up 88% of the population, and the average house had 2.3 persons living there. 64% of the population was married. 73% of households (family and non-family) owned their houses, and 27% rented their houses. The average house was worth $804,800, which is higher than the average in Providence.

The neighborhood is home to a significant Jewish population. The Jewish Community Center of Rhode Island was established on Elmgrove Avenue in 1971; later this merged with other communal organizations and became known as the Jewish Alliance of Rhode Island. The area is also home to the Providence Hebrew Day School on Elmgrove Avenue and Temple Emmanuel on Morris Avenue.

== Government ==
Ward Two encompasses Blackstone, all of College Hill and Wayland north of Angell Street, and parts of Mount Hope. As of the 2018 elections, Helen Anthony, a Democrat, represents the ward in the City Council.
