= Blackstone Boulevard Park =

Public park in Providence, Rhode Island

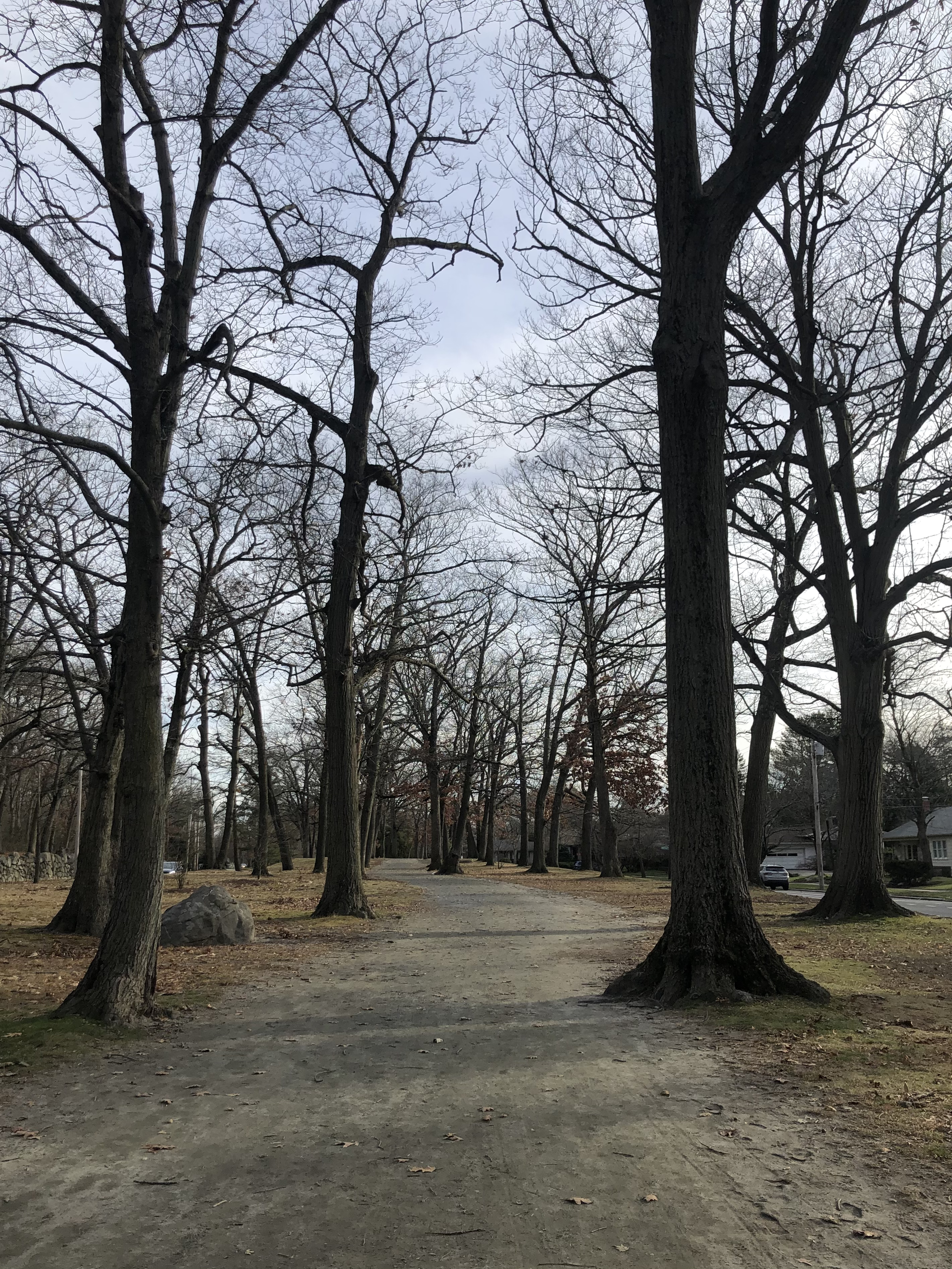
- Blackstone Boulevard trail
- Interactive map of Blackstone Boulevard Park
- Type: Urban park
- Location: Providence, Rhode Island
- Coordinates: 41°50′15″N 71°23′06″W
- Area: 45 acres (18 ha)
- Created: 2003
- Operator: Blackstone Parks Conservancy

Blackstone Boulevard Park is a public park and footpath that runs down the center of Blackstone Boulevard on the East Side of Providence, Rhode Island. It is located in the Blackstone neighborhood, an affluent and primarily residential part of Providence. The park is well-used by joggers and dog walkers from the East Side of Providence and surrounding areas. Along with the Blackstone Park Conservation District, it is run in partnership between the non-profit Blackstone Parks Conservancy and the Providence Parks Department. The Conservancy actively maintains the condition of the park and path, as well as planting and caring for the trees and other flora along the path. Blackstone Boulevard is also a part of the National Register of Historic Places, at the boundary of the Blackstone Park Historic District and Blackstone Boulevard Realty Plat Historic District.

== History and construction of the Boulevard ==
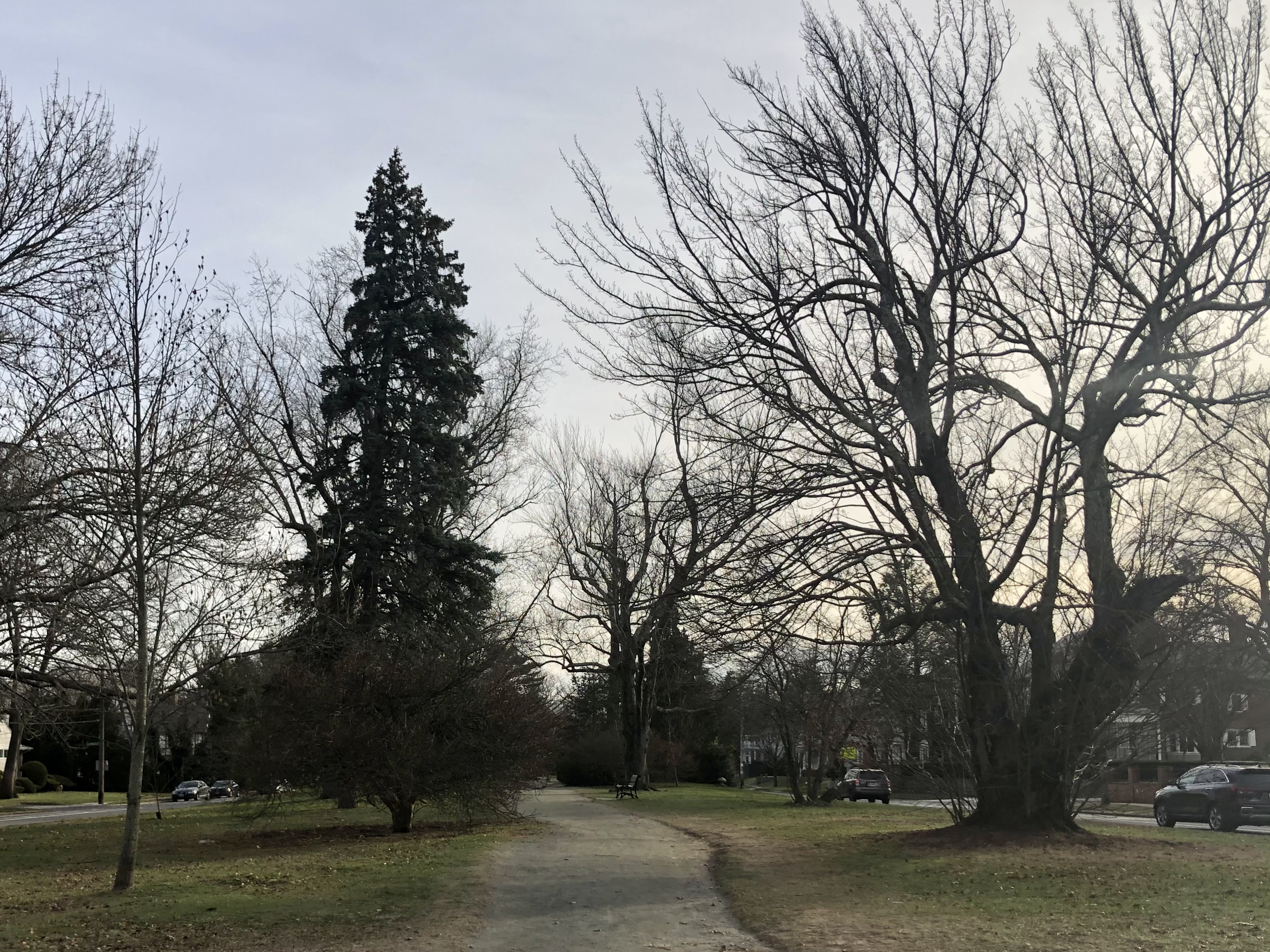
The park in winter

The City of Providence General Assembly bought the land for construction of the Blackstone Boulevard in the late 19th and early 20th centuries. The City authorized a loan of $150,000 to purchase the final parcel of land for Blackstone Boulevard, and to complete both the Boulevard and Roger Williams Park, in 1901.

Blackstone Boulevard Parkway in its later form was designed with the renowned firm of the landscape architect Fredrick Law Olmsted. The landscape architectural plans made by the Olmsted firm date to 1903-04.

== Notable places and residents ==
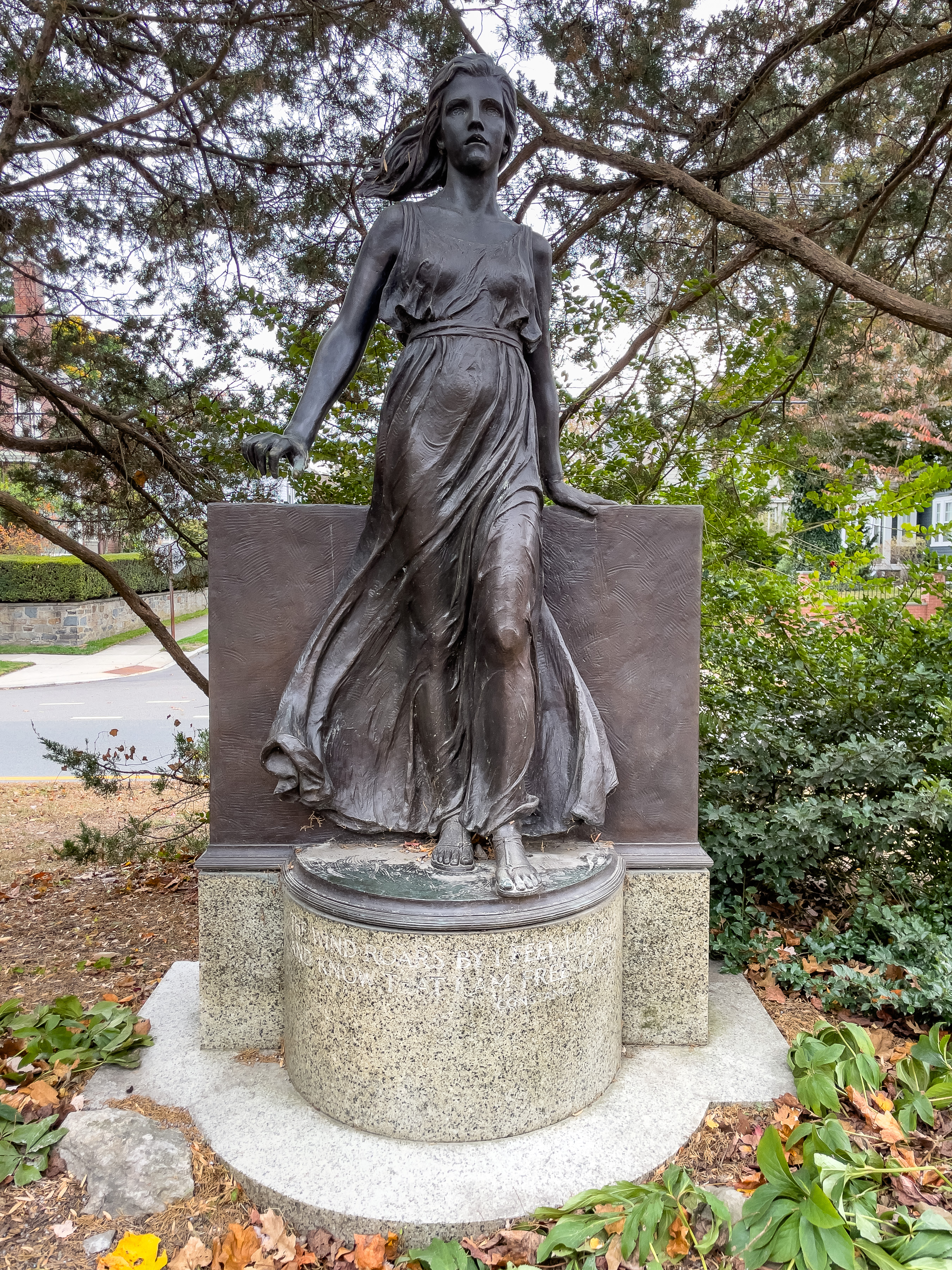
"A Memorial to Young Womanhood (or The Spirit of Youth)"

Several important Providence institutions are located on Blackstone Boulevard, including Swan Point Cemetery and the historic Butler Hospital. Blackstone Boulevard is also lined by many 19th and 20th century mansions. A number of noted residents of Providence have lived on Blackstone Boulevard, among them former mayor of Providence Buddy Cianci.

At some point "towards the end of the 20th century," the bronze sculpture "A Memorial to Young Womanhood (or The Spirit of Youth)," was moved from Constance Witherby Park to the Blackstone Boulevard median at Clarendon Avenue.

== See also ==
- Blackstone Park Conservation District
- Blackstone, Providence, Rhode Island
- Blackstone Park Historic District
- Urban green space
