= Constance Witherby Park =

- U.S. National Register of Historic Places
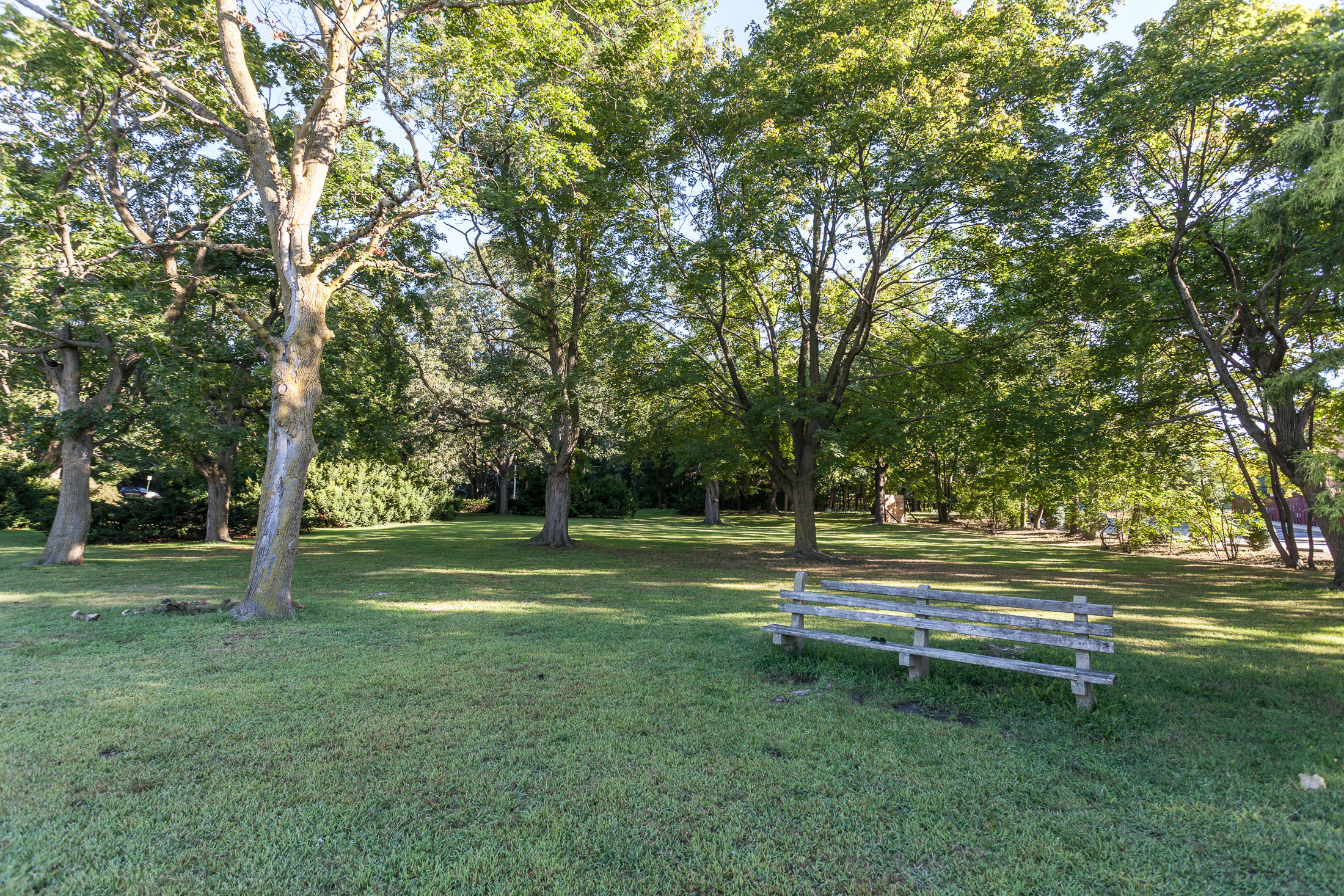
- Constance Witherby Park in 2013

- Location within Rhode Island Location within the United States
- Location: Providence, Rhode Island
- Coordinates: 41.82739°N 71.38378°W
- Built: 1929
- Architect: Thomas, Ernest K.
- NRHP reference No.: 75000005
- Added to NRHP: November 25, 1975

Constance Witherby Park is an historic park at 210 Pitman Street, Wayland, Providence, Rhode Island. It was added to the National Register of Historic Places in 1975.

The park was donated in 1929 by Mr. and Mrs. S. Foster Hunt in memory of Mrs. Hunt's daughter by her first marriage Constance Witherby (1913–1929). It was landscaped by then-Superintendent of Parks Ernest K. Thomas. The park occupies the space between Waterman Street and Pitman Avenue, across from the Salvation Army. It is a small, heavily wooded park (just over 100,000 square feet) with many trees and a few park benches.

The centerpiece of the park was once a bronze sculpture, called "A Memorial to Young Womanhood (or The Spirit of Youth)", by sculptor Gail Sherman Corbett (1871 – 1952). The sculpture depicted a young girl wearing a windblown dress, in homage to the spirit of young Constance who died of heart failure just before her 16th birthday while climbing in the Swiss Alps.

The statue was dedicated in 1933 and removed sometime "towards the end of the 20th Century". The sculpture was moved to its new home on Blackstone Boulevard near its intersection with Clarendon St.

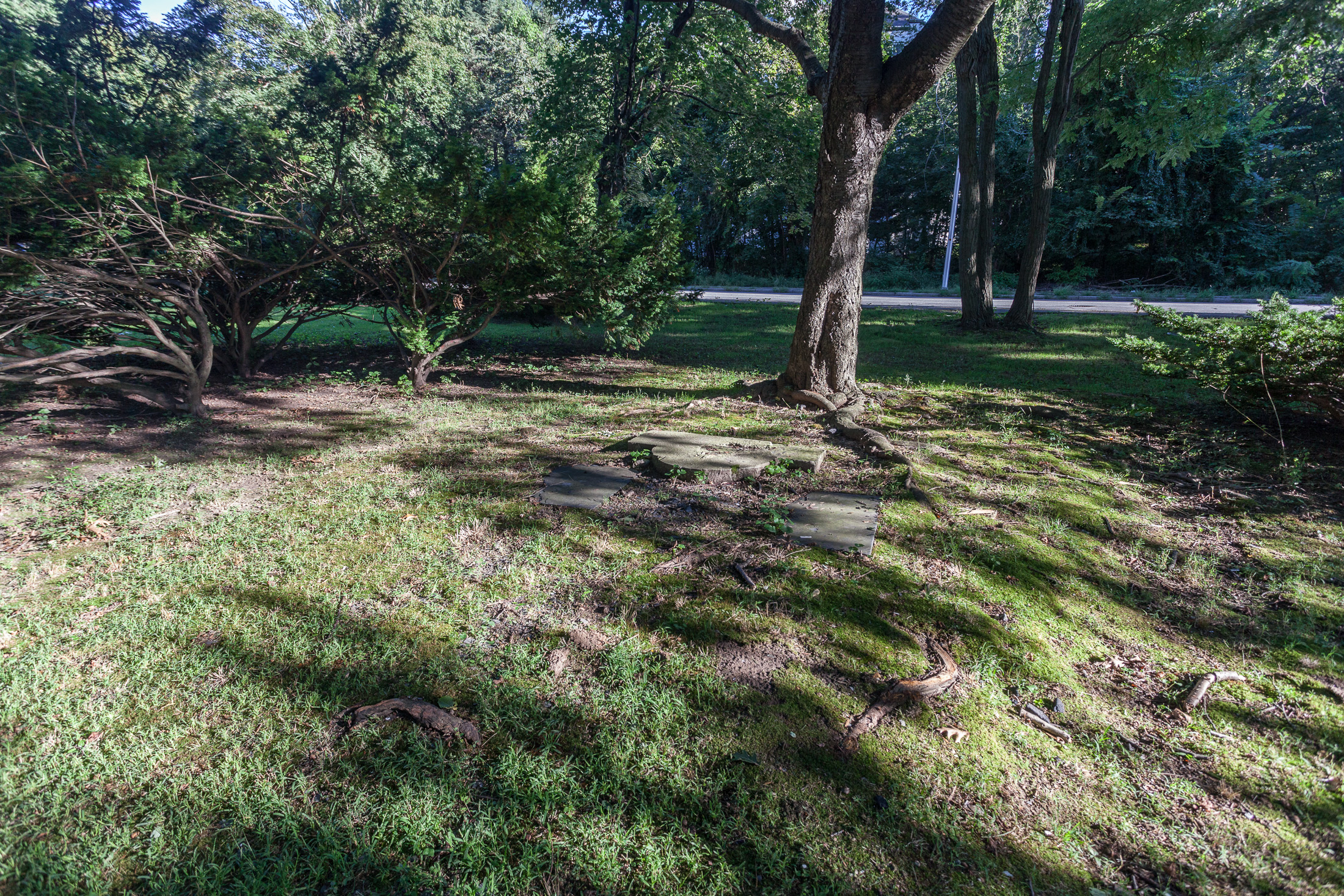
General area where sculpture "A Memorial to Young Womanhood" once stood

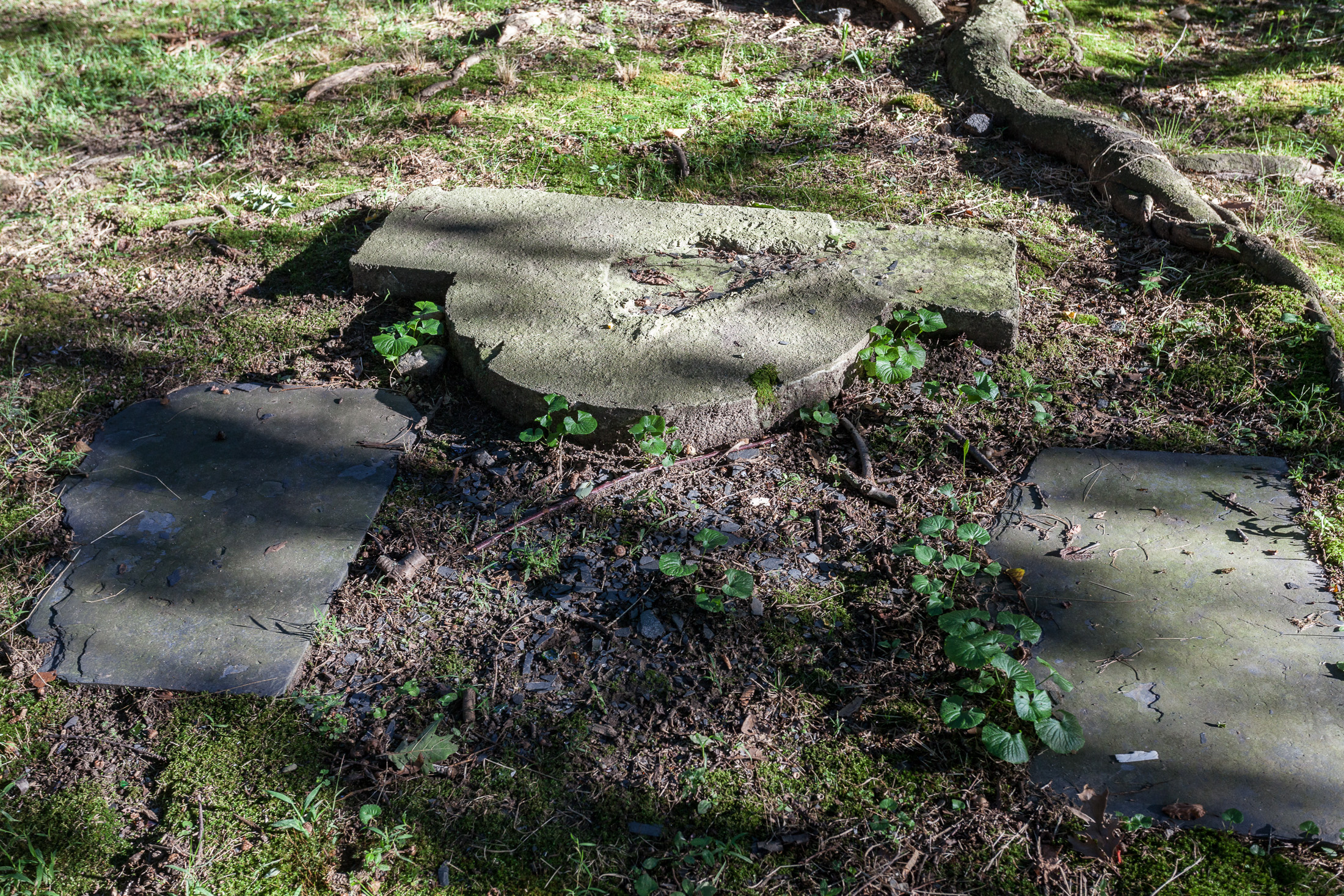
Stone base where sculpture once stood

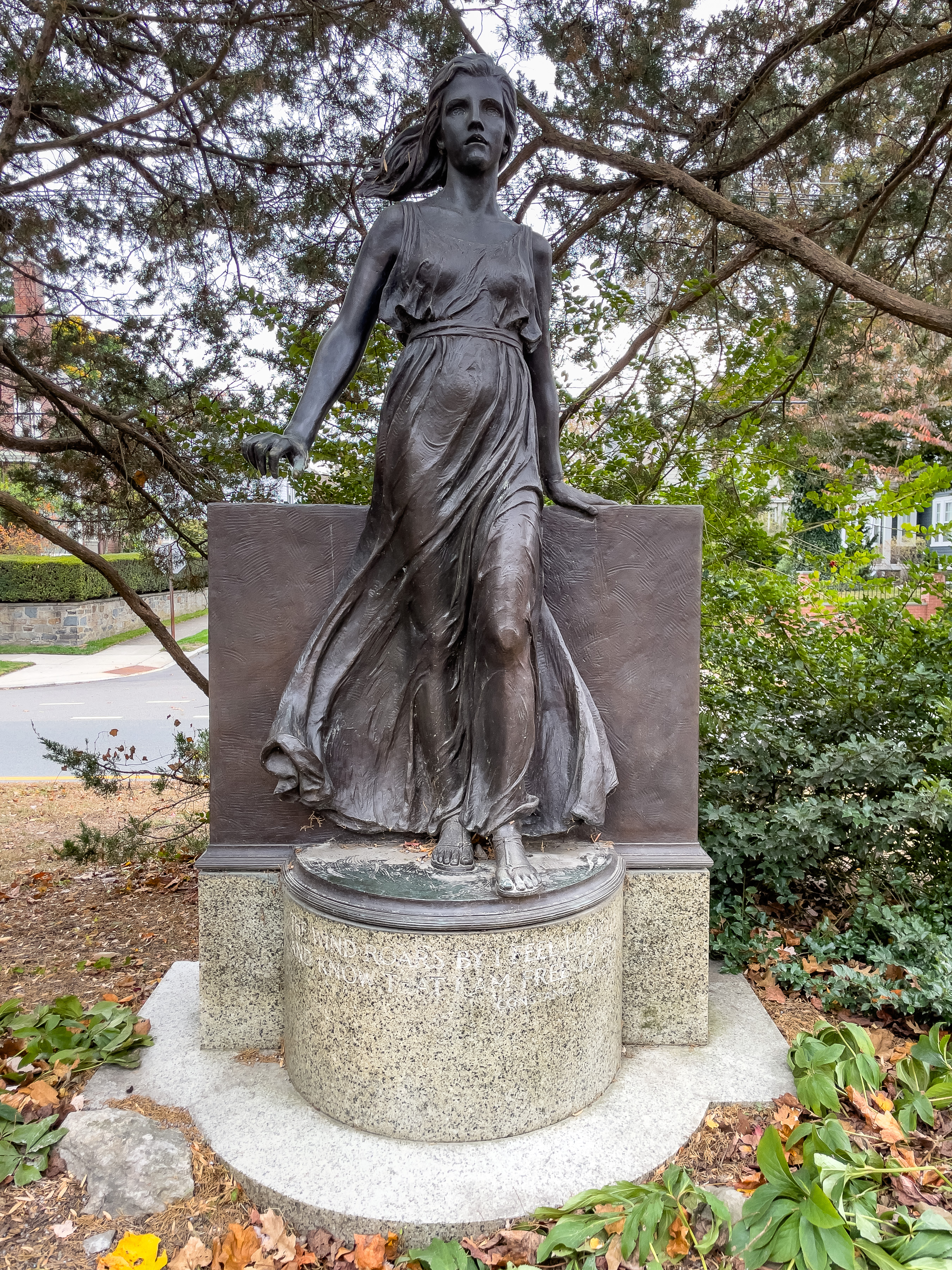
"A Memorial to Young Womanhood" was relocated to Blackstone Boulevard in the late 20th century

== See also ==
- National Register of Historic Places listings in Providence, Rhode Island
