= Carpenter Homestead =

- U.S. National Register of Historic Places
- U.S. Historic district
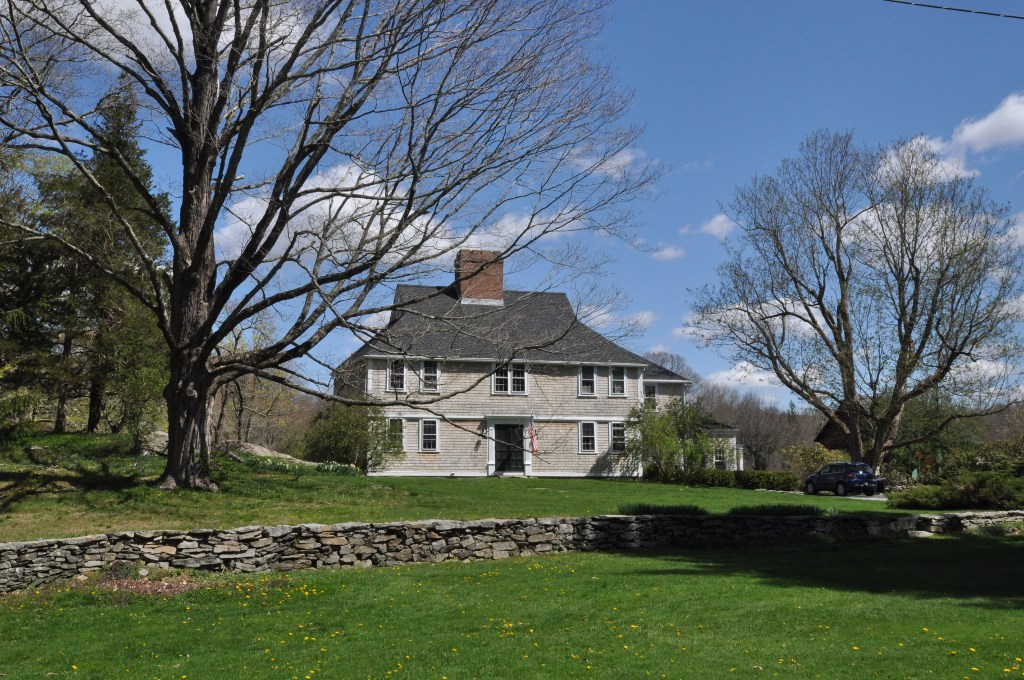

- Location within Massachusetts Location within the United States
- Location: 80 Walnut Street, Seekonk, Massachusetts
- Coordinates: 41°51′2″N 71°18′15″W
- Area: 500 acres (200 ha)
- Built: 1720
- Architect: Edwin E. Cull
- Architectural style: Colonial Revival, Colonial, Georgian
- NRHP reference No.: 93000902
- Added to NRHP: September 17, 1993

The Carpenter Homestead is a historic colonial American house and farm in Seekonk, Massachusetts. Also known as Osamequin Farm, this 166-acre (67 ha) property includes a farmhouse and outbuildings whose construction history begins c. 1720. The farmland historically associated with the property includes 113 acres (46 ha) in Seekonk and 53 acres (21 ha) in Rehoboth. The main house, now a 2 1/2-story wood-frame structure with a gable-over-hip roof and central chimney, was begun c. 1720, underwent numerous alterations and expansions, and was given a historically sensitive restoration in the 1940s under the direction of architect Edwin E. Cull. The core portion of the main barn dates to the same time, with numerous additions in the intervening centuries, and also underwent restoration work in the 1940s. The property was under continuous ownership by the Carpenter family from its construction until 1939, and is one of Seekonk's oldest houses.

The property was listed on the National Register of Historic Places in 1993.

== See also ==
- National Register of Historic Places listings in Bristol County, Massachusetts
