= Bur cucumber =

Bur cucumber is a common name for several plants and may refer to:

- Cucumis anguria, native to Africa and naturalized in many other parts of the world
- Echinocystis lobata, native to North America, also known as "wild cucumber."
- Sicyos
  - Sicyos angulatus, native to eastern North America
