= Freeman Plat Historic District =

Historic residential area in Rhode Island, U.S.

- U.S. National Register of Historic Places
- U.S. Historic district
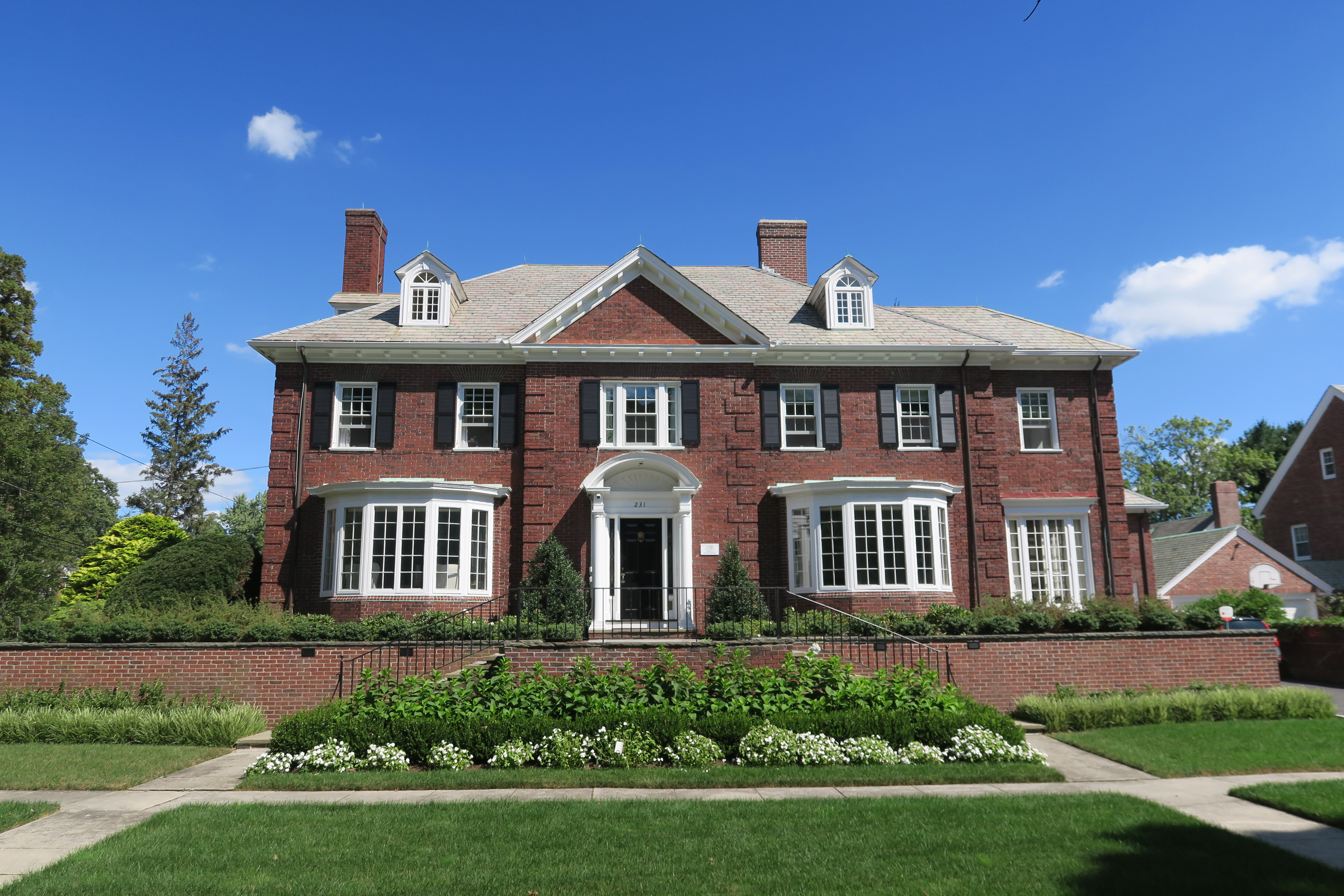
- Edwin E. and Martha O. Chase House

- Location within Rhode Island Location within the United States
- Location: Providence, Rhode Island
- Coordinates: 41°50′18″N 71°23′39″W
- Area: 50 acres (20 ha)
- Built: 1916
- Architect: Olmsted & Olmsted
- Architectural style: Late 19th And 20th Century Revivals
- NRHP reference No.: 95000664
- Added to NRHP: June 2, 1995

The Freeman Plat Historic District is a residential historic district on the East Side of Providence, Rhode Island. The district is a well-preserved example of an early-20th-century planned residential area, encompassing some 50 acres (20 ha). It is roughly bounded by Sessions Street, Morris Avenue, Laurel Avenue, and Wayland Avenue, and consists of a network of generously landscaped winding roads, laid out in consultation with the Olmsted Brothers design firm. The houses built are generally of high quality, many of them architect-designed, with architecturally diverse revival styles popular at the time. The area was developed between 1916 and 1929 by John Freeman, who owned a country estate in the area, and sought a way to develop the largely swampy tract.

The district was listed on the National Register of Historic Places in 1995.

== See also ==
- National Register of Historic Places listings in Providence, Rhode Island
