= Howard, Rhode Island =

Coordinates: 41°44′48″N 71°27′22″W

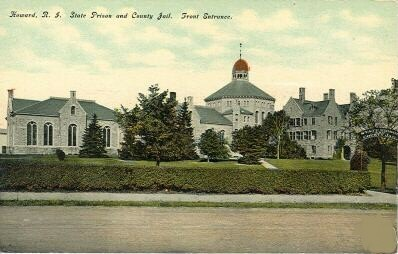
Rhode Island's "Howard Prison" in Cranston, Rhode Island at the turn of the 20th century

Howard was originally a farming hamlet in the southern part of Cranston, Rhode Island.

In the mid-19th century, most of the land was acquired by the State of Rhode Island to construct a state prison, a poor house, and other state facilities. The Rhode Island State Prison, designed by prison reformer John Haviland was first built in 1878, and is a stark and imposing gothic structure built of granite block. Over the last several decades, numerous other institutional buildings for incarcerated criminals and the intellectually disabled were constructed.

Today, Howard encompasses an area of almost one square mile. Its numerous prison buildings house over 2,000 male and female prisoners as well as several hundred mental health patients.

== See also ==
- List of prisons in Rhode Island
