= Blackstone Boulevard Realty Plat Historic District =

Historic district in Providence, Rhode Island, United States

Coordinates: 41°50′43″N 71°23′15″W

- U.S. National Register of Historic Places
- U.S. Historic district
- Location within Rhode Island Location within the United States
- Location: Providence, Rhode Island
- Built: 1923
- Architect: Martin, Marshall B.; Aldrich, William T., et al.
- Architectural style: Late 19th- and 20th-century revivals
- NRHP reference No.: 95000711
- Added to NRHP: June 9, 1995

The Blackstone Boulevard Realty Plat Historic District is a historic district roughly bounded by Blackstone Blvd., Rochambeau Ave., Holly St. and Elmgrove Ave. in Providence, Rhode Island.

The district features architecture by Marshall B. Martin, William T. Aldrich and other structures of late 19th- and 20th-century colonial revivals. It was added to the National Register of Historic Places in 1995.

== Description ==
The Blackstone Boulevard Realty Plat Historic District is an approximately 40-acre (16 ha) suburban residential neighborhood in the northeast corner of Providence. Within it are over 100 large, high-style houses on ample, meticulously landscaped lots that line wide, tree-lined streets, now as during the period of significance. Integrity of both individual properties and of the district as a whole remains extremely high.

The Blackstone Boulevard Realty Plat constitutes a collection of early and mid-20th-century revival style dwellings as well as a representation of later contemporary styles-all designed and built by some of the locality's foremost architects and builders.

Within the district's roughly trapezoidal area the streets generally follow a grid pattern. It is bordered on the east by Blackstone Boulevard, a broad north-south thoroughfare with two roadways separated by a landscaped esplanade, and on the south by Rochambeau Avenue. Holly Street and Elmgrove Avenue, both running generally north-south, lie just within the district's western boundary. Elmgrove Avenue continues in a gentle "S" curve to join Blackstone Boulevard at the district's northern boundary. Cole Avenue, a straight north-south street parallel to Elingrove Avenue and Blackstone Boulevard, links Rochambeau to Elmgrove and serves as the spine for four perpendicular cross-streets: Intervale, Westford, Wingate, and Harwich Roads. Balton Road completes the grid, running north-south between Rochambeau and Intervale.

Houses in the district are located on large, wide lots that are 8,000, 10,000, or 12,000 square feet. A number of lots exceed even this generous size, and two large lots at the southern end measure 1.75 and 3.59 acres. At the time the plat was developed, the standard Providence house lot was 4,000 to 5,000 square feet. The use of deed restrictions in the design of the dwellings and in their placement within the lot affected the visual quality of the Blackstone Boulevard Realty Plat. Deed restrictions governed minimum lot size, minimum setback, distance between neighboring houses, and garage placement. With the exception of the two large lots, houses within the district are set back a uniform distance of twenty feet from the street.

Most dwellings in the plat were built in the late 1920s or early 1930s. They are typically clapboard, brick, brick-veneer, or stucco covered wood-frame construction, executed in revival styles fashionable in the early and mid-20th century. Neo-Georgian and Tudor/Old English Cottage are the most prevalent, followed by Mediterranean, Norman/French Provincial, and a number of stylistic hybrids. Most properties have a garage, either incorporated into the house more frequent in later construction or built separately near the rear of the lot. The free standing garages are often in the style of their houses.

The integrity of the district is excellent. All buildings have been well maintained. Additions and alterations generally respect the character of original construction. Unsympathetic renovations are few, and generally limited to occasional replacement of original wood siding with aluminum or vinyl-but, without removing trim-and inappropriate replacement windows-usually thermal-pane sash with imitation muntins.

Because development within the district did not fill the area before construction ceased during World War II, there are some twenty houses dating from 1946 to the present. New buildings are commensurate in quality with those associated with the period of significance but fall outside the fifty-year eligibility guideline of the National Register. These dwellings, fine examples of 20th-century domestic architecture in their own right, have been included in the inventory of the district as non-contributing buildings. They should be reevaluated in the future for their contribution to the significance of the district.

== Houses included in the district ==
=== Gustaf and Marion L. Sweet House; 1951; 20 Balton Road, Providence, RI ===
Gustaf and Marion L. Sweet House; 1951; 20 Balton Road Providence RI; Elsworth Reed, builder. A one-story split-level, aluminum-sided dwelling with a cross-gable roof. A one-car garage is incorporated at basement level in the projecting wing. Sweet, a physician, had his office at 196 Waterman Street.

=== Charles H. Hudson House; 1929; 22 Balton Road, Providence, RI ===
Charles H. Hudson House; 1929; 22 Balton Road, Providence, RI; R. S. Hamilton, architect; Frank N. Gustafson, builder. A one-and-a-half-story, weatherboard and brick, English Cottage dwelling with a cross-gable roof and entrance in the forward-projecting wing. Hudson was a manager for E. I. duPont de Nemours & Company.

=== Frederick E. and Albina Bodell House; 1928, 25 Balton Road, Providence, RI ===
Frederick E. and Albina Bodell House 1928, 25 Balton Road, Providence RI: William T. Aldrich of Boston, architect. A handsome dwelling designed in the manner of an 18th-century English manor house, set on a large lot partly surrounded by a brick wall. Constructed of hollow tile with Flemish-bond brick veneer, it has a two-and-a-half-story, hip-roofed main block with a one-and-a-half-story, hip-roofed, L-plan service and garage wing extending from one side. The house has a garden front on the south and an entrance front on the north. The seven-bay garden front has a central segmental-arch-pediment door surmounted by a stone bay with a shallow relief caning of a shouldered architrave around the window. The entrance front, overlooking a motor court framed by the main block and the service wing, has a three-bay, end-gabled entrance pavilion with a doorway-framed by pilasters and a pediment. There are segmental relieving arches over the windows and segmental-arch roof dormers. This is one of the grandest and most costly houses erected in Providence in the 1920s. Bodell was a partner in Bodell & Company, a banking and brokerage firm.

=== Carl W. Miller House; c. 1926; 32 Balton Road, Providence, RI ===
Carl W. Miller House; c. 1926; 32 Balton Road, Providence, RI; A two-and-a-half-story, brick-clad, Modern Colonial house with a central recessed doorway framed by pilasters and imposts with rosettes and an entablature broken by an architrave with a plinth block above, and flanked by bay windows. Miller was a professor at Brown University.

Garage before 1936: A single-bay, structure located behind the house, not visible from the street.

=== Sidney A. and Edith Kane House; 1949, 35 Balton Road, Providence, RI ===
Sidney A. and Edith Kane House 1949, 35 Balton Road, Providence, RI: Royal Barry Wills, architect; Nerforth Brothers, builders. A one-and-a-half-story, weatherboard sheathed Cape Cod cottage with a cross-gable roof and large center chimney. Kane was president of Senak Company of America.

=== Allen H. Grimwood House; c. 1925: 38 Balton Road, Providence, RI ===
Allen H. Grimwood House; c. 1925: 38 Balton Road, Providence, RI; George W. Waterman, architect; Silvan Brothers, builder. A two-and-a-half-story shingled Colonial Revival dwelling with a projecting central vestibule and a front dormer. Grimwood was a salesman at H. A. Grimwood Company, lumber dealers at 1163 Westminster Street.

Garage 1925 : A two-car, one-bay, gable-roofed, weatherboard sheathed structure built contemporaneously with the house.

=== Edmund J. and Margaret A. Sullivan House; 1931-32; 45 Balton Road, Providence, RI ===
Edmund J. and Margaret A. Sullivan House; 1931–32; 45 Balton Road, Providence, RI; Edwin E. Cull, architect; A. H. Leeming & Sons, builder. A large, handsome, two-and-a-half-story brick dwelling in the Georgian Colonial style of the middle Atlantic region, with segmental-arch ground floor windows, paneled shutters, a modillion cornice, segmental-arch dormers, and a high hip roof with a flat central deck surrounded by a balustrade. Set on a corner lot, the house has two facades: one facing Balton Road and one facing a motor court of f Intervale Road. The Balton Road front contains a recessed central doorway trimmed with Ionic pilasters on pedestals, a cushion-frieze entablature, and a segmental-arch pediment. The more elaborate courtyard front has a pedimented doorway in a central projecting entrance pavilion flanked by large bow windows. Sullivan, grandson of rubber magnate Joseph Banigan, lived with his new bride and parents in the family home at 254 Wayland Avenue until this house was completed. Like others in his family, he worked in manufacturing.

=== John J. Bidder House; c. 1926; 50 Balton Road, Providence, RI ===
John J. Bidder House; c. 1926; 50 Balton Road, Providence, RI; A two-and-a-half-story, five-bay facade, brick, Colonial Revival dwelling with a center entrance with sidelights. Bidder was the founder of the J. J. Bidder Cordage Company, manufacturers of cordage and rope, located at 251 Tockwotton Street.

== See also ==
- National Register of Historic Places listings in Providence, Rhode Island
